= Georgie Lane =

Fictional character from Our Girl

- Our Girl character
- First appearance: "Lane"; 7 September 2016
- Last appearance: "Episode 28"; 28 April 2020
- Created by: Tony Grounds
- Portrayed by: Michelle Keegan

In-universe information
- Occupation: Army medic
- Affiliation: British Army
- Significant others: Elvis Harte (fiancé); Jamie Cole (fiancé)
- Relatives: Max Lane (father); Grace Lane (mother); Marie Lane (sister); Lulu Lane (sister)

Georgie Lane is a fictional character from the BBC military drama Our Girl, played by Michelle Keegan. Georgie first appeared in the first episode of the second series, originally broadcast on 7 September 2016. Georgie serves as the replacement protagonist of the series after the departure of Molly Dawes (Lacey Turner), with Georgie filling the role for the remainder of the series. Introduced as an established corporal, Georgie's storylines in the series have included her romances with Elvis Harte (Luke Pasqualino), Jaime Cole (Royce Pierreson), and Captain James (Ben Aldridge), being kept as a prisoner of war by Al-Shabaab, and her struggles and responsibilities as an army medic, both physically and mentally.

Georgie has been described as brave, resilient, and hard-working. Keegan was interested in and found inspiration for her portrayal from the accounts of female combat medics that she listened to while preparing for the part. The actress found the physical training for the series to be tough, yet she wanted to perform as many of her own stunts as she was allowed. After the show's fourth series was greenlit, Keegan announced that it would be her last one as she wanted to pursue other projects despite enjoying her time on the series. The show itself was cancelled as a result, as creator Tony Grounds felt Georgie's ending was an appropriate way to end the series as a whole. Despite the character and her storylines being met with mixed reception, Keegan won a TV Choice award for Best Actress, alongside receiving several other nominations for her portrayal.

== Development ==
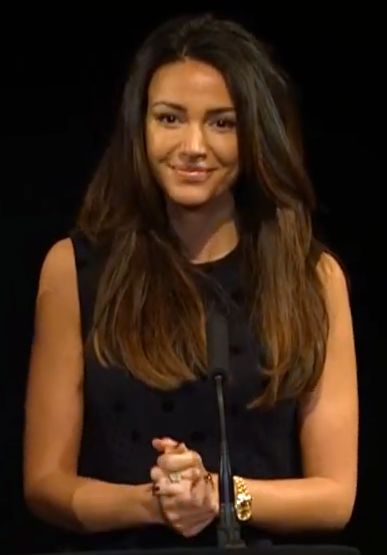
Michelle Keegan (pictured) plays Georgie Lane.

In September 2014, it was announced that Lacey Turner, who played protagonist Molly Dawes in the first series of Our Girl, had departed from the show to return to her role on EastEnders. In June 2015, it was announced that as a result, actress Michelle Keegan had been cast as Georgie, a new character who would replace Molly as the show's lead character. Keegan expressed excitement to join the show, as she considered herself a "massive fan", and called being given the lead role "a big but exciting challenge". The BBC billed Georgie as a "gutsy, passionate and unstoppable" soldier who was a "crisis junkie" and a "workaholic". They explained this as being because her job provides her with excitement. They continued by detailing that one of Georgie's strengths is her bravery, and as her "courage stems from her empathy", she is "strong without being hard". Despite having a "great heart", Georgie is "emotionally tough", "hardened", and "cynical". Keegan described Georgie as "experienced", "professional", and someone who "puts her work first" and doesn't "take anything lying down". In the series, Georgie hails from Manchester, a decision series creator Tony Grounds incorporated after Keegan was cast as, having grown up there herself, "it was good to write for her voice".

Keegan heard stories from female army medics to build her understanding of Georgie's character. She noted that some of their stories were "heartbreaking" and concluded after hearing them that she wouldn't be able to handle Army life. To prepare physically, Keegan began attending a gym, a task she didn't enjoy. Keegan trained for the part in Aldershot Garrison, and found the fitness preparation challenging, detailing that it included physically taxing drills, medical training, and push-ups which left her with aches. Despite this, the actress found training provided an effective bonding experience for the cast and described performing stunts as "liberating". Going into the series, Keegan aimed to perform as many stunts herself as she could. She was surprised by how heavy the weapons used in training were. Keegan opined that the filming experience gave her a new respect for soldiers in the Army, tipping her hat to them.

Alongside Georgie, two new characters, Elvis Harte, played by Luke Pasqualino and Jamie Coyle, played by Royce Pierreson, were introduced for series two. As the series progresses, it is established that Georgie met Elvis on the front lines during the War in Afghanistan and Jamie in Manchester Hospital while doing a medical placement. Georgie was placed at the centre of a love triangle with the two that ended in Georgie choosing neither. Grounds explained afterwards that this decision was incorporated as he wanted Georgie to "be her own woman" and avoid being defined by her relationships. Her romance with Elvis was set to continue into the show's third series, with their chemistry teased to show "no signs of abating" as Georgie would struggle to "escape her past" with him. Keegan teased a "bust-up" between the characters and noted it as her favourite scene to film. After Elvis was killed off, Keegan commented that his death "really affected" Georgie. She added that Georgie "buries her head in the sand" to try and convince herself that things are okay, even though she is struggling. Keegan explained that romance would not be a priority for Georgie for the time being, as when she gets her heart broken, she tends to throw herself into her work. The actress opined that she wanted Elvis and Georgie to live "happily ever after" but understood that their relationship struggles were necessary for accuracy. After the death, Georgie wears his engagement ring around her neck, an idea Keegan came up with so Georgie could "have a part of him with her at all times".

In January 2019, it was confirmed that Keegan would return for the show's fourth series. She teased that Georgie would have "unfinished business" going in and voiced excitement to return, explaining: "Being in Our Girl has been one of the highlights of my career so far. I feel very lucky to be part of the show and I'm really excited that it's coming back". The actress teased that the running theme of the upcoming series would be about Georgie getting "closure" as she would still struggle with grieving from Elvis's death. In January 2020, it was confirmed that Keegan had left the role to pursue other opportunities. Further explaining her decision to leave, Keegan said she would miss playing Georgie, but after four series on the show, it was time to move on. Despite leaving, Keegan didn't rule out a future return to the series, commenting: "You can never say it's forever". Discussing her character's future, Keegan detailed that since Georgie had finally received the closure she "desperately needed", she had now been able to deal with the grief she had been carrying. She clarified that "Georgie will always love Elvis" but now was able to "move on". Following Keegan's departure, the shows was axed, as Grounds explained: "With the finale of series four showing Georgie ready to move on with her life, it feels like the right time for us to do the same".

== Storylines ==
After accepting an offer to join 2-Section on a humanitarian mission in Kenya due to the team needing a medic, Georgie is abducted by Al-Shabaab and kept as a prisoner of war. Once the special forces are brought in to help with her rescue, Georgie fashions an infrared signal using a TV remote, which alerts 2-Section to her location, and they plan an airstrike on the compound. Georgie is rescued but is furious when she sees her ex-fiancé Elvis Harte (Luke Pasqualino) leading the rescue as he abandoned her on their wedding day. Before returning to the UK, Elvis apologises to Georgie and explains that he left the wedding because he just found out he was a father. Back in the UK, Georgie is relieved to see her family again, but her guilt and PTSD from the events on the tour cause her to see visions of one of her captors, Abu (Michael James), a radical convert. Intel suggests that Abu escaped the air strike in Kenya, and it is theorised that his associates will carry out a series of coordinated terrorist attacks across Manchester. On her wedding day to her new fiancé, Jamie (Royce Pierreson), Georgie leaves him at the wedding to stop Abu, which she succeeds in with Elvis's help, at the expense of her relationship.

When 2-Section is deployed on a humanitarian mission in Nepal following an earthquake, Georgie, now a corporal, is tasked with mentoring new recruit Maisie Richards (Shalom Brune-Franklin). While helping with the earthquake, Georgie bonds with an NGO member named Milan Dhakal (Rudi Dharmalingam) and when they are caught in an aftershock, Maisie saves them both, earning some respect from Georgie. After a successful rescue mission, new intel arrives, and 2-Section will be working with the special forces in Afghanistan to apprehend a Taliban leader. Georgie is reacquainted with Elvis, and it is revealed that Elvis once had a one-night stand with Maisie. When Maisie tells Elvis about Georgie and Milan's relationship, he is hurt. After talking to Georgie, they are able to reconcile, and Elvis proposes to Georgie. Georgie accepts the proposal, before, Elvis dies in an explosion on their next mission. As a heartbroken Georgie tries to resuscitate him, Elvis dies in her arms. After a few months of rest, Georgie returns to duty in 2-Section as the team embarks on a mission in Nigeria.

Due to Georgie's emotional struggles, her commanding officer Captain James (Ben Aldridge) leaves a negative report about her. Determined to prove herself on a training exercise in the Belize jungle, she leads her team. When Captain James's leg is severely injured by a booby trap, and with lethal drug bandits in the jungle, Georgie, Captain James and a local teenage boy named Ezra (James Baller) hide in a cave and await rescue. As Captain James's health worsens, he confesses his marital struggles to Georgie and tells her about his wife, Molly Dawes (Lacey Turner), wanting a divorce. After a tense showdown with the bandits, Georgie is able to get Captain James to safety. However, the severity of his injuries mean he now needs a six-month rest from work. When Captain James returns, Georgie tells him she doesn't want to grow closer to him. However, their friendship turns romantic during a tour in Bangladesh, and the two sleep together on their last night.

As 2-section prepares to depart on a tour in Afghanistan, Georgie is indecisive on whether she should go, as it is where Elvis was killed. After deciding to join the team, she forms a friendship with a struggling new recruit named Mimi Saunders (Amy-Leigh Hickman), encouraging her to call her parents for support when she begins struggling under pressure. As the team helps in a hospital, Georgie learns that residents believe the vaccines being given out are poisoned. When her colleague Fingers (Sean Ward) is shot dead and the team fly home to attend his funeral, Georgie is sent to see a clinical psychologist, who concludes that Georgie no longer has PTSD from Elvis's death, but she is still grieving. To achieve closure, Georgie finds the man responsible for Elvis's death, who begs to be killed before Georgie leaves him. She later sends her engagement ring from Elvis into the sky on a kite, marking that she is prepared to move on.

== Reception ==
Upon the announcement that Keegan would replace Turner, Dale Cowan of Cultbox reported mixed reactions to Keegan's casting, writing that while fans didn't see her as a "suitable replacement", but hoped she would be able to impress as she had been well-received in her previous roles. After watching the episode that aired on the 7 September 2016, Cowan praised Keegan's performance, explaining that while she "creates a very different energy", she did "incredibly well" to engage viewers and give them an understanding of Georgie's personality. However, he criticised how her "character and portrayal don't seem as confident as they should be". What's On TV praised Keegan's portrayal and wrote that viewers were "mostly thrilled" by it, but noted some audiences missing Molly. As the second series progressed, Cowan praised Keegan for eventually having "found her stride" as Georgie. After a "harrowing" episode broadcast on 14 September 2016, which followed Georgie's attempts to escape captivity at the hands of Al-Shabaab, Justin Harp of Digital Spy commented that the episode gave Keegan "her chance to shine", noting many viewers beginning to "warm up" to the new character. Harp noted that Twitter users were praising Keegan for her "brave" portrayal of the character, commenting that it "sent hearts racing".

Aime Grant Cumberbatch of The Standard reported viewers being invested by the chemistry between Keegan and Pasqualino, and showcased various tweets from users hoping the characters would resume their romantic relationship. Susanna Lazarus of Radio Times commented that Elvis's death, and by extension the end of his relationship with Georgie, had "broken viewers hearts" and "immediate outcry" followed. Harp (Digital Spy) reported negative reactions to the episode broadcast on 26 June 2018, which showed Captain James admitting his infatuation with Georgie. He explained that as viewers had "just stopped complaining" about Georgie losing Elvis, the new relationship had "pissed off" the show's fans. The Standard's Kimberly Bond reported generally positive viewer reactions to the episode broadcast on 24 March 2020, which focused on Georgie grieving Elvis's death, as many praised Keegan's performance. Susannah Alexander and Laura Jane Turner of Digital Spy called Georgie's final scenes "emotional". Across her stint, Keegan was often criticised for her overly groomed appearance given the setting.

For her portrayal of Georgie, Keegan received four consecutive nominations for the Best Actress at the TV Choice Awards from 2017 to 2020, winning the award at the 2018 ceremony. At the 24th National Television Awards, Keegan was nominated for the best Drama Performance. At the 2020 TVTimes Awards, Keegan was nominated for the Favourite Actress award.
