= Our Girl series 3 =

Our Girl
- Series 3
- DVD cover
- No. of episodes: 12

Release
- Original network: BBC One
- Original release: 10 October 2017 – 24 July 2018

Series chronology
- ← Previous; Series 2 Next → Series 4

The third series of the British military drama television series Our Girl began broadcasting on 10 October 2017 on BBC One, and ended on 24 July 2018. The series follows 2-Section through four missions in Nepal, Nigeria, Belize, and Bangladesh. It consists of twelve sixty-minute episodes.

== Production ==
On 5 October 2016, it was announced that Our Girl had been greenlit for a third series, with Michelle Keegan set to return to her role. The new series was set to contain 12 episodes, over twice as many as the previous two series. The series would also be split into two parts, with each one following on 2-Section through a different tour. While writing for the series, creator Tony Grounds admitted he aimed to shed light on emergency disaster relief, as the army often participate in it. Before choosing a location for the series's setting, he researched areas that were often struck with natural disasters and helped by the British Army's involvement. Part one focusing on a mission in Nepal following an earthquake. The second part of the series would be set in the Belize/Guatemalan border, and then the Myanmar/Bangladesh border. After Luke Pasqualino told Grounds that he would leave after Part 1 of the series, his character's death was written in to explain his absence, a decision he felt was a good one for dramatic effect. Actress Keegan teased that the series would "pick up with Georgie at home with her friends and family, and she gets a call from Captain James asking her to come out to Nepal for a NGO relief mission" and teased that it would "join Georgie and Elvis in episode one in Syria where they left things on an even keel. They are work colleagues but there is still love there. Georgie still believes they can't be together but Elvis still tries his luck a couple of times. Obviously Elvis is a ladies' man but she does find out a few things she doesn't like. She tries to be professional but deep down I think she's genuinely hurt". The first teaser for the series was released on 23 September 2017.

In May 2018, the second part of series 3 was announced. Part 2 would follow 2-Section through Nigeria, Belize and Bangladesh. For the Nigerian section, a training mission was set to turn into a rescue one after many schoolgirls go missing due to Boko Haram. The Belize section would focus on its border with Guatemala and follow 2-Section through harsh jungle terrain. The third and final section, set on the Myanmar/Bangladesh border, was based on true events following the Rohingya refugees fleeing across the border into overcrowded camps. Grounds chose Bangladesh as the final part as he was interested in stories about Rohingya Muslims crossing the border from Myanmar and living in refugee camps, and found drug lords to be an intimidating enemy. Grounds detailed that he spent a "long time listening to soldiers and people" from around the countries to achieve accuracy and authenticity of the struggles in the areas. It was produced by John Griffin and Lizzie Rushbridger, and executive produced by Grounds, Hilary Salmon and Mona Qureshi.

The first part of series 3 began filming in May 2017. It was filmed in areas surrounding Kathmandu, Nepal, where it took place. Crew took advantage of the filming and story sharing a setting, as scenes were filmed in a village that was affected by the April 2015 Nepal earthquake, where parts of the story were also set. With the villagers' permission, the art department enhanced the damage inflicted on the village. Villagers were used as extras on occasion. Despite the series primarily being filmed in Nepal, some scenes used Cape Town, South Africa (where series 1 and 2 were filmed) as a stand-in for Nepal. Scenes taking place in Afghanistan were filmed in South Africa's Karoo Desert. Preparation was completed in bootcamps in Sandhurst and South Africa. Keegan explained that the filming process involved actors waking up early in the morning, which she "couldn't stand". There were two military advisors on set. Keegan disclosed that she enjoyed getting dirty and gritty when filming, enjoying the contrast it offered between her other roles and public persona. The actress recalled being "covered in bruises" after filming finished, as the series had the most "physically demanding" stunts performed, as Keegan said: "There are a lot more stunts involved, more Army-based scenes and a lot more running which I'm not very good at! I've had to learn how to run like I'm in the Army – nightmare".

Part 2 was filmed in South Africa and in the Taman Negara jungle in Malaysia over a nine-month period, which Keegan described as "really long". On occasion, actors filmed six-day weeks. Scenes taking place in the Belizean jungle were shot in Malaysia, Bangladesh was chosen as the last location for the series to cut costs on transport film equipment, as Bangladesh could also be filmed there. Griffin felt that Bangladesh being filmed in Malaysia came with advantages as a large population of the country are of Indian descent, making it easier to cast actors and extras, and the foliage was similar in both countries. Aldridge described filming in the Malaysian jungle as being "beautiful but tough", attributing the humidity, insects, and heavy makeup as reasons why. Keegan echoed finding it challenging, but admitted "you just adapt" after a while as "your body acclimatises". She also noted the insects being tough, recalling that the actors and crew members had to wear leech socks at all times. Again, military advisors were present on set to ensure accuracy.

Michelle Keegan reprised her role as protagonist Georgie Lane. Speaking on her return, she enthused about returning and commented that she was "very excited to bring more stories of Georgie Lane to life". Captain James and Elvis Harte both returned for the first part of series 3, with Ben Aldridge and Luke Pasqualino, respectively, set to reprise their roles. Aldridge teased growth for his character, explaining viewers can expect to "get more insight in a later tour" as his character would begin to question the ethics of war. Teasing Elvis's return, Pasqualino commented viewers would be "surprised" by the development of his character's relationship with Georgie, adding that Elvis would become "incredibly head over heels" for her in the upcoming series. Royce Pierreson's Jamie Coyle was announced to not return, with Keegan assuming "he's probably settled down, got married and still a doctor". A new lead character, Maisie Richards, to be played by Shalom Brune-Franklin, was also announced. She was described as "very outspoken and rebellious" and would "instantly" be at odds with Georgie. Pasqualino described the character as "a spanner in the works" of Georgie and Elvis's relationship. Other new cast members included Rudi Dharmalingam as Milan Dhakal, an engineer set to "catch Georgie's eye", and Harki Bhambra as Rab Khalil, described as being a smarter member of 2-Section.

In part 2, Keegan returned as Georgie, who would now struggle with the grief of Elvis's death. Keegan teased the series showcasing Georgie "throwing herself into work" as a method of coping, adding that her character is "definitely not over Elvis at all and you’ll see throughout the episodes that his death has really affected her". Aldridge also reprised his role, teasing that Captain James was also "trying to lose himself in his work" and "steadily becomes more war weary than ever and starts to question his future with the British Army". Grounds confirmed both characters would struggle emotionally in the remainder of the series. Olly Rix was cast as a new character, 'Bones', whom he described as "a tricky kind of guy" and "abrasive, brash and yet highly competent as a soldier". He concluded "for all his naughtiness, he's a decent man with a healthy disrespect for authority". Grounds billed Bones as a "flawed but dedicated" soldier "with a massive heart". Maisie, Rab, Sergeant King, Brains, Monk, and Fingers all returned, with their actors reprising their respective roles.

== Cast ==
=== Nepal Tour ===
- Michelle Keegan as Georgie Lane
- Luke Pasqualino as Elvis Harte
- Dwayne Walcott as Peanut
- Mark Armstrong as Spanner
- Shalom Brune-Franklin as Maisie Richards
- Angela Lonsdale as Grace Lane
- Ben Aldridge as Captain James
- Harki Bhambra as Rab Kalil
- Simon Lennon as Brains
- Sean Sagar as Monk
- Sean Ward as Fingers
- Rolan Bell as Sergeant King
- Pranesh Maharaj as Major Thapa
- Rudi Dharmalingam as Milan Dhakal
- Salina Shrestha as Tara
- Sabin Basnet as Da Chand
- P. Upadhya as Nepalese Police Chief
- Ashley Houston as Dyno
- Shreelata Shahi as Maya
- Jonas Khan as Captain Azizi
- Akheel Omesh as Malik
- Clayton Evertson as Captain Khan

=== Nigeria and Belize Tours ===
- Michelle Keegan as Georgie Lane
- Sean Sagar as Monk
- Simon Lennon as Brains
- Harki Bhambra as Rab Khalil
- Sean Ward as Fingers
- Rolan Bell as Sergeant King
- Shalom Brune-Franklin as Maisie Richards
- Ben Aldridge as Captain James
- Charles Adesanmi as Kwabono
- Patrick Sithole as Adewole
- Mzukisi Ntantiso as Ogucho
- Olly Rix as Bones
- Thando Guma as Cala
- Ntombi Makhutshi as Woman in Lampese
- Mark Armstrong as Spanner
- Thapelo Sebogodi as Boko Haram Leader
- Dwayne Walcott as Peanut
- Ama Qamata as Grace
- Dominika Jablonska as Clem
- Diana Ablyakimova as Waitress
- Marcio Sebsam as Bandit 1
- John Michie as Brigadier
- Steve Toussaint as Roger Mendez
- Christiano Genuino Da Silva as Bandit 2
- James Baller as Ezra
- Bibiana Anthony as Ezra's Mother

=== Bangladesh Tour ===
- Rolan Bell as Sergeant King
- Shalom Brune-Franklin as Maisie Richards
- Harki Bhambra as Rab Kalil
- Michelle Keegan as Georgie Lane
- Simon Lennon as Brains
- Sean Sagar as Monk
- Olly Rix as Bones
- Ben Aldridge as Captain James
- John Michie as Brigadier
- Sean Ward as Fingers
- Patrick McNamee as Jason 'Ruby' Curry
- Anwaar Beg Moghal as Captain Dutta
- Bhuwaneswaran as Hostage
- Farzana Dua Elahe as Barsha Chowdhrey
- Navin Chowdhry as Inspector Ratna Chowdhrey
- Imran Khan as Sumon
- Shaheffendi Bin Abd Razak as Mr Thakur
- Chacko Vadaketh as Sir Iqbal Nurbhai
- Ganesan Manohgaran as Driver
- Bibi Ashya as Maya
- Frethana Tina as Maya's Friend
- Karan Hundal as NGO Interpreter
- Choi Lai Yoke as Madam
- Shakirah Mohd Salim as Asha
- Hamza Jeetooa as Captain Das
- Nur Eleena Bulwant Abdullah as Teacher
- Charles Roberts as Gunman 2
- Gobbinath Batumalai as Gunman 1
- Kajai Priya as Village Woman
- Mark Armstrong as Spanner
- Malek Abbas as Barber
- Ben Batt as Blue
- Nethra Tilakumara as Jamila Khan
- Dwane Walcott as Peanut
- Guison Lal as Fazel
- Gobbinath Batumalai as Gunman 1
- Tilottama Pillai as Supervisor

== Episodes ==
No. overall	No. in series	Title	Directed by	Written by	Original release date	UK viewers (millions)
Part 1
11	1	"Nepal Tour: Episode 1"	Tim Fywell	Tony Grounds	10 October 2017	6.30
After an earthquake in Nepal, 2-Section is deployed on a humanitarian mission there. Georgie, now an established corporal, is offered a place on the emergency relief team, which she accepts. Captain James arranges for Georgie to mentor a new recruit, Maisie Richards, to Georgie's reluctance. They fly out to Kathmandu and are set to work in a village in the Nepalese mountains with various NGOs to treat injuries and recover bodies. Meanwhile, Maisie tests Georgie's patience by being reckless and talking back. Georgie bonds with Milan Dhakal, an NGO member who is associated with Nepal Disaster Relief. A local girl named Tara helps Georgie translate what injured people say but later steals a phone from Rab Khalil, another new recruit. Captain James and Georgie become annoyed with Maisie for not being concentrated enough and for stealing a truck that is needed to transport a generator and warn her. After Tara tells Maisie she wants to get married and have children, Maisie tells Tara she can do anything she sets her mind to in the UK. Talking to Milan while on a walk, Georgie learns of the high rates of trafficking and slavery in Nepal before they feel an aftershock and become trapped in the wreckage. Georgie calls out to Milan to check he is okay, to no response.
12	2	"Nepal Tour: Episode 2"	Tim Fywell	Tony Grounds	17 October 2017	5.73
2-Section realise Georgie and Milan are gone. They are found by Maisie, who risks her life to rescue them, earning Georgie's respect. Maisie and Rab find out Tara took Rab's phone, which he lets her keep after Maisie adds her number. The next day, seven of the children in the village, including Tara, go missing, having been taken by a man named Da Chand, who is associated with a false NGO, to be sold into sexual slavery. Based on previous cases, Milan assumes he took them to Kathmandu, so Georgie leads a rescue mission there. Maisie tracks Rab's phone to a brothel, so Nepalese police are contacted and help with the mission. They storm the building, catch Da Chand, and rescue all the children, who are all unharmed. The children are set to travel back to their village the next day and rest in the barracks, but Tara insists she doesn't want to return, seeking opportunities. Da Chand is charged with trafficking and fraud. The remainder of 2-Section joins them in Kathmandu, and special forces are brought in. They learn that Da Chand is affiliated with the Taliban, so Da Chand has been released so his movement can be monitored to lead them to a terrorist named Aban Omar. 2-Section is to support the special forces on the mission as Elvis and Georgie catch up.
13	3	"Nepal Tour: Episode 3"	Jon Wright	Amy Roberts & Loren Mclaughlan	24 October 2017	5.51
2-Section set out to Afghanistan, and Captain James is reacquainted with Captain Azizi. When they get to the checkpoint, Elvis tells Captain James that his relationship with Georgie is over, despite admitting they will never be able to stay friends. He is dismayed to learn that a one-night stand he once had with Maisie has become public knowledge. They plan their attack, as intel shows Da Chand led MI6 to Omar's compound in Nahri Saraj. As the area will be heavily guarded, the mission must be covert to extract Omar. Elvis tells Maisie their night together didn't mean anything, and she jokingly cries. Maisie tells Elvis about Georgie and Milan's relationship, which hurts him. Captain Azizi talks to Captain James, and asks him to abort the mission, citing a bad feeling. Regardless, they set out and Maisie notices Captain Azizi nodding to a suspected insurgent. When she raises the concerns, they are ignored. The mission fails as the Taliban knew they were coming, and many soldiers are injured. Captain James figures out Captain Azizi is a double agent and furiously confronts him. Captain Azizi says the British Army's presence makes the Taliban stronger before he is accidentally shot dead by an insurgent. Elvis comforts Captain James as the team ponders how to get out.
14	4	"Nepal Tour: Episode 4"	Jon Wright	Tony Grounds	31 October 2017	5.36
2-Section retreat to Kabul. Georgie saves Rab's life after it is found that bullet shrapnel got into his lungs. Captain James is proud of the team and hopes they will never set foot in Afghanistan again. After Elvis overhears Georgie saying she will go back to Nepal to build prefabs, he interferes, not wanting her to rekindle with Milan. He declares that he has changed and is willing to give up everything for her, which charms her. Maisie receives a call from Tara, who is travelling with Shia pilgrims in the hopes of getting to the UK. Despite their exhaustion, 2-Section is ordered to support special forces on a final mission to capture Omar after he is located. Following Captain Azizi's death, Captain James struggles to come to terms with the point of British involvement in Afghanistan. Before they go, Elvis proposes to Georgie, and she accepts. The mission fails as Omar escapes after shooting Elvis. As a heartbroken Georgie tries to resuscitate him, Elvis dies in her arms. After getting back, Captain James consoles her. 2-Section returns to Nepal to finish their work. Georgie apologises to Milan and he sympathises with her. Georgie reads Elvis's death letter that asks her to remember him, causing her to tear up. Maisie learns that Tara washed up on UK shores and will be deported to Nepal.
Part 2
15	5	"Nigeria Tour: Episode 1"	Rob Evans	Tony Grounds	5 June 2018	5.00
After a few months on rest, Georgie returns to duty in 2-Section, set to train a section of Nigerian medics in Lagos. Georgie struggles with coping with Elvis's death, refusing to remember his funeral and seeing him in her sleep. 2-Section helps escort the Nigerian Army to the north of the country to help deliver medical supplies to areas surrounding it as it is during the fight against Boko Haram. The next day, 2-Section heads to Lampese, where Sergeant King admits his excitement as he is of Nigerian heritage. Georgie admits to Captain James that she doesn't feel they are doing enough to help. Captain James thinks Georgie needs more time off, but she is adamant that she only wants to help. Continuing, 2-Section is attacked by a child soldier named Cala, who gets shot by a 2-Section soldier. Georgie nurses him, and 2-Section detain him. He tells Georgie they will die if they go to Lampese, as he is from there. They arrive at Lampese and begin working. As many in nearby villages can't get to the clinic, Georgie suggests collecting them, which Captain James approves of. Sergeant King, Maisie, Rab and Nigerian medic Adewole accompany Georgie. While they plan to find information about a recent case of missing schoolgirls, their truck is ambushed.
16	6	"Nigeria Tour: Episode 2"	Rob Evans	Tony Grounds	12 June 2018	4.73
Georgie and the others are imprisoned in a Boko Haram compound and wait bravely as the Boko Haram rebels beat Adewole for being a Nigerian affiliated with the British Army. When the vehicle is found abandoned, Captain James is visited by an old acquaintance named Bones, a special forces operative who he has a history with. Bones is furious with him as 2-Section's capture exposed an undercover mission the special forces were on to gather intel, but he agrees to help break them out. After successfully infiltrating the compound, Georgie insists on going back to save Adewole, only to be scolded by Bones. When they get back, Georgie feels immense guilt for disrupting the special forces mission as their exposure reduces the chances of information about the missing schoolgirls getting out, but her teammates console her. The barracks are then approached by the Boko Haram rebels, who want Cala back as he is the leader's son. 2-Section and special forces work on recovering Adewole and a young girl, trading them for Cala. The girl, named Grace, has a vest of bombs strapped to her, which Bones manages to remove safely. The girl is returned home and that night, 2-Section relaxes and prepares to relocate the next morning.
17	7	"Belize Tour: Episode 1"	Noreen Kershaw	Tony Grounds	19 June 2018	5.32
Recovering after the ordeals of both Afghanistan and Nigeria, Georgie and 2-Section find themselves in Belize for a jungle training exercise and some much-needed rest. For being tricked by Captain Azizi, Captain James received a bad report that is going on his record. Georgie learns Captain James also criticised her in a report about Elvis's death. 2-Section gets split into teams, with Georgie leading one. Things turn bad as Captain James is caught in a booby trap which sends a spear through his leg, leaving him unable to walk without assistance. While Georgie stays with him to try to prevent the wound from becoming infected, 2-Section retreats to the base to raise the alarm and arrange a medevac. They are discovered by a teen boy named Ezra, who tells them the jungle is populated with a lethal gang of drug bandits who will kill them if they are found. As it gets dark, 2-Section must halt their search as Ezra takes them to his village to hide them. Georgie and Captain James confide in each other about Elvis's death, as they both greatly miss him. As the drug bandits approach the village, Georgie and Captain James escape undetected. That night, taking refuge under a tree, the two hear the village being terrorised by the bandits before they burn it down.
18	8	"Belize Tour: Episode 2"	Noreen Kershaw	Tony Grounds	26 June 2018	5.42
The next day, with the training exercise having become a fully-fledged rescue mission, Bones and his special forces unit are called in to assist. Ezra returns to Georgie and Captain James and leads them to a cave they can hide in. Meanwhile, special forces arrive at the village, where they find traces of Georgie and Captain James. Captain James's health slowly worsens, as he sees visions of his wife, Molly, before telling Georgie of his marital struggles back home, with Molly believing her husband can't survive without his job, as he is unable to function when he isn't in the army, adding that she wants him to leave her. Captain James apologises to Georgie for indirectly causing Elvis's death. A bandit finds them in the cave, and as he radios the others, Ezra kills him, and the trio relocates once again. The special forces reach the cave and hide while the bandits retrieve the man Ezra killed. Georgie gets Captain James to an airfield in a clearing, and while Ezra signals to a passing plane, he is shot dead by the bandits. The special forces arrive in the nick of time and shoot all the bandits dead before a helicopter rescues Captain James. Once returning, Captain James is sedated from his infections, so Bones is appointed the new commanding officer of 2-Section, to their collective horror.
19	9	"Bangladesh Tour: Episode 1"	Brian Grant	Tony Grounds	4 July 2018 (Note: This episode was originally due for broadcast on 3 July, but was moved due to coverage of the 2018 FIFA World Cup.)	4.18
Six months on from Captain James's accident and 2-Section being under Bones's command, the team are set to go on a tour in an understaffed refugee camp on the Bangladesh/Myanmar border. Keen to toughen them up and show the brigadier he's capable of leadership, Bones threatens to send one person home after a week if they aren't up to standard, with two recruits joining them as possible replacements: Fingers, returning after failing special forces selection, and Ruby, a new medic. The camp, which is run primarily to help Rohingya refugees escaping Myanmar, is run by Barsha Chowdhrey, the wife of police chief Ratna Chowdhrey. Georgie, wanting to help stranded refugees, suggests they go to the Naf River, where many arrive from, to help more people get to the camp. The idea is accepted, and Georgie is horrified to see the number of refugees. 2-Section's effort finally impresses Bones. At a gala held for the Brigadier, Ratna becomes the target of an assassination attempt for his hatred of the corruption in Bangladesh. A man slips a bomb into his bag, and Bones acts quickly to rescue him, and at the cost of his own life, he is blown up as a result. Due to Bones's death, a fully recovered Captain James returns as commanding officer.
20	10	"Bangladesh Tour: Episode 2"	Brian Grant	Kelly Jones	17 July 2018 (Note: This episode was originally due for broadcast on 10 July, but was originally moved to 13 July due to coverage of the 2018 FIFA World Cup. However, due to overrunning coverage of Wimbledon 2018, broadcast was again moved to 17 July.)	4.65
Due to Bones's death, 2-Section has the camp on lockdown. Captain James tells Georgie that will arrange a transfer for her if she feels uncomfortable, as she doesn't want to grow closer to him. The attacker at the party has not been identified. Still, Inspector Chowdhrey suggests it is linked to drug traffickers who exploit the refugee route to transfer ya ba from Myanmar to Bangladesh, as the bomb was aimed at him as he's tough on the drug runners. The incident worries Barsha as it could have been her husband, with Georgie reassuring her. Georgie meets Maya, a sex worker and ya ba addict who is being treated at the clinic. She asks her if she knows anything about the smugglers, but Maya says nothing. Georgie sees a police officer named Ahmed acting oddly, so reports him. Maya is later beaten to death for being seen talking to Georgie. A hole is realised in Chowdhrey's story, so it is speculated that he is involved. When he goes missing, Bangladeshi special forces are called in to help apprehend him as he tries to escape the country. Barsha asks Georgie to rescue Maya's daughter in Bulna, as she lives with Maya in a brothel and her mother has unpaid debts. 2-Section saves Asha and on the way back, spots Chowdhrey trying to escape. The team successfully stop him.
21	11	"Bangladesh Tour: Episode 3"	Sarah O'Gorman	Tony Grounds	23 July 2018 (Note: This episode was originally due for broadcast on 17 July, but was moved due to the delayed broadcast of Episode 10.)	4.47
As they help people, it is discovered that the camp's drinking water is infected with cholera. Many people are isolated and Georgie and Ruby realise they have their work cut out for them. As Chowdhrey is to be relocated from prison to the police station to make a statement, Captain James offers to assist in case of assassination attempts, with Georgie coming to ensure he is fit to travel, while 2-Section gets to work on digging graves for the high number of fatalities. While Chowdhrey is being transferred, he says he refuses to make a statement. Back at the camp, Georgie struggles with Elvis's loss, and Captain James comforts her by saying she can always depend on him. He later receives a call from Molly saying she is moving out. The next day, sponsors for the camp back out due to Chowdhrey's actions and Georgie sees Barsha purchasing antibiotics with cash, and she works out it was cash made from the drug trafficking. Georgie asks her to make Chowdhrey confess, but she refuses to out of worry for her son. When they visit him, Chowdhrey agrees to make a statement as long as Barsha and Sumon face no consequences. Later, when Georgie and Maisie collect Sumon from school, they are ambushed and Sumon is abducted.
22	12	"Bangladesh Tour: Episode 4"	Sarah O'Gorman	Tony Grounds	24 July 2018	4.67
Georgie suggests special forces involvement to track down Sumon, but Captain James declines as it is considered a local issue. Barsha, needing to tell Chowdhrey about Sumon's abduction, is escorted to the police station by Georgie. Captain James follows them. When Barsha tells Chowdhrey, he is devastated, begs to be taken in Sumon's place, and threatens to retract his police statement. The station is then blown up, with everyone surviving. Georgie only sustains a laceration, but her near-death experience helps her realise how fragile life is, and she embraces her feelings for Captain James. Back at the camp, Ruby comes out to Georgie, and she tells him to be himself before she sleeps with Captain James. Later, special forces, brought in after the police station explosion, arrive to brief 2-Section on how to extract Sumon. They use the names given by Chowdhrey to track him down to seven possible points. After the correct one is confirmed, they wait for their moment to strike. When it comes, they kill all the insurgents and rescue Sumon. However, once special forces leave, many more insurgents are seen arriving, and with nowhere to go, 2-Section runs away. They are chased to the edge of a cliff in a forest, and with no other options, 2-Section jumps into the river below.
