= Captain James =

Fictional character from Our Girl

- Our Girl character
- First appearance: "Time"; 21 September 2014
- Last appearance: "Bangladesh Tour: Episode 4"; 24 July 2018
- Created by: Tony Grounds
- Portrayed by: Ben Aldridge

In-universe information
- Full name: Charles "Charlie" James
- Occupation: Commanding officer
- Affiliation: British Army
- Spouses: Rebecca (wife); Molly Dawes (wife)
- Children: Sam (son)

Captain James is a fictional character from the BBC military drama Our Girl, played by Ben Aldridge. Captain James first appeared in the first episode of the first series, originally broadcast on 21 September 2014. He is introduced as the laid-back but professional commanding officer of 2-Section. His storylines in the series have included the blossoming of his romance with Molly Dawes (Lacey Turner), his intense dedication to his work, his friendship with Elvis Harte (Luke Pasqualino), his inner struggles surrounding the morality of war, and his second romance with Georgie Lane (Michelle Keegan).

Captain James has been described as experienced and authoritarian, but fun and easygoing. Aldridge enjoyed the task of playing someone in charge. His character's toxic love of his work was an ongoing theme during his time on the series, as Aldridge noticed that his character was happy in his co-workers' company and could only function in the army. Aldridge was captivated by his character's continuing mental health struggles, as he found it to be a delicate matter within the armed forces. After the cast for the show's fourth series was announced, and Aldridge's absence was quickly noted, it was confirmed that he had left the role to pursue other projects he had commitments to. Captain James's relationship with Georgie was criticised by viewers, and his departure was seen as abrupt and underwhelming.

== Development ==
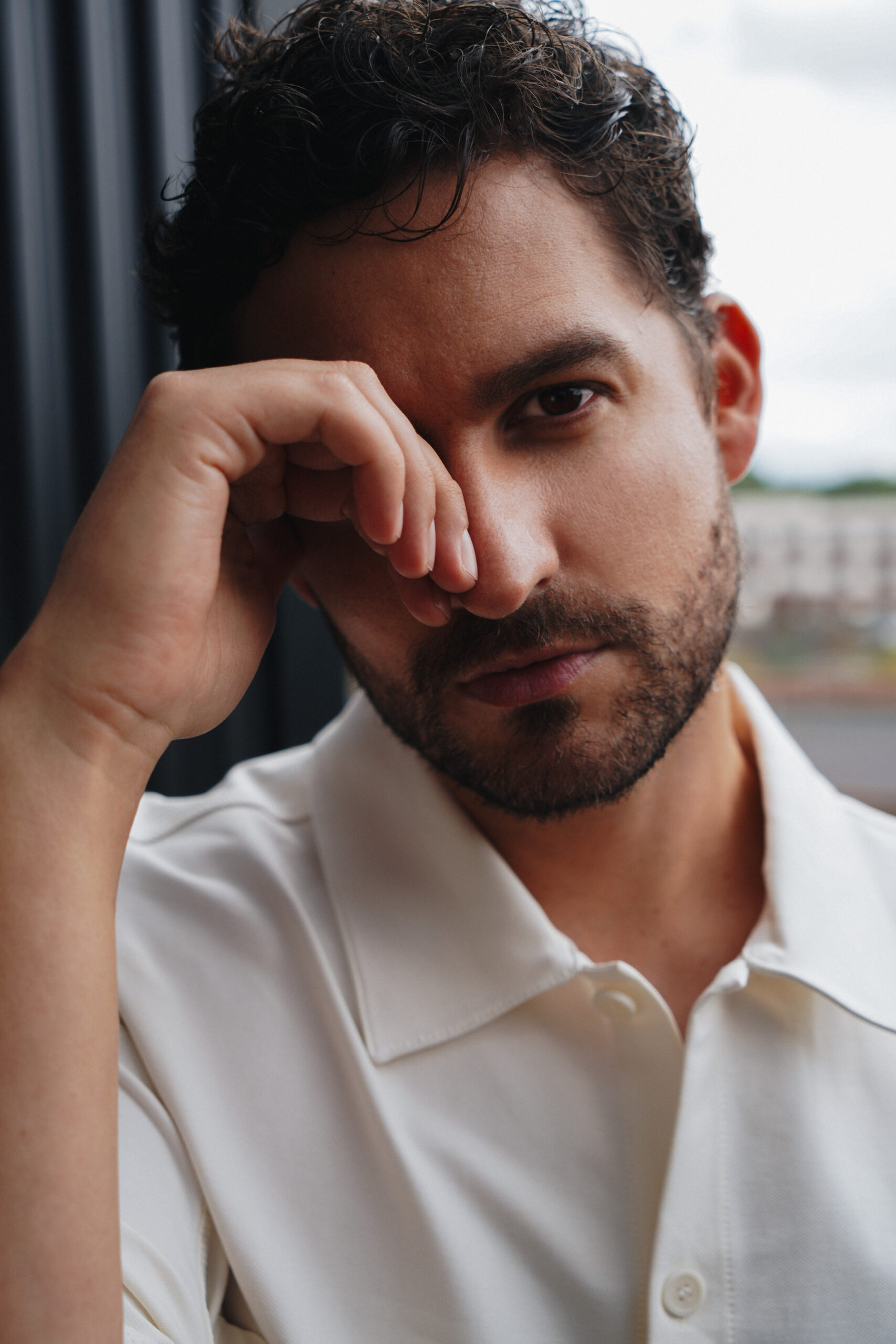
Ben Aldridge (pictured) plays Captain James.

After being cast in Our Girl, actor Ben Aldridge described his character as "an interesting mix of authority and fun" and someone who has an occasionally "laissez-faire" attitude towards leadership. He explained this as being because he is "happy in the presence of his lads", but when needed, he takes his position very seriously and "puts his duty to his men first beyond anything". He explained that this was the fourth tour Captain James had embarked on, making him highly experienced, and noted that "he fits into the army more than he probably feels he fits into civilian life". Aldridge was pleased to receive the role of an authoritarian figure, opining that it was an "interesting challenge" to play the commanding officer. Captain James would feature in a love triangle with protagonist Molly Dawes (Lacey Turner) and his friend Smurf (Iwan Rheon). When asked about his initially rocky relationship with protagonist Molly, Aldridge responded that Captain James is initially filled with doubt over her capabilities and misunderstands her personality, leading him to be "pretty harsh" on her at first. He is also "pretty wary" of her as she has a lot of responsibility as 2-Section's only medic. Aldridge commented that the treatment came from a desire to be professional. However, he teased that his character is eventually warmed by her "cheeky charm" after almost losing her, realising she was one of the only people able to "break down his barriers".

Shortly after it was announced that Our Girl would return for a second series without Turner's Molly, both Grounds and Aldridge teased that Captain James would return. It was later confirmed that Aldridge would reprise his role. Aldridge teased the second series would display a "slightly more war-weary" and "matured" Captain James. Set to follow 2-Section through a humanitarian mission in Kenya, Captain James would ask new lead Georgie Lane (Michelle Keegan) to join the team. Explaining the offer, Aldridge commented that the team "needs an experienced and trustworthy medic" following Molly's departure and knows Georgie is "more than capable". Aldridge enjoyed the differences between Molly and Georgie, namely how Molly had to "earn her stripes" and Georgie was already well-respected. Despite noting that his character "already has huge respect" for Georgie, he teased that "she still manages to impress and surprise him" throughout the series. As a close friend of Molly's, Aldridge disclosed that Captain James has a "very professional relationship" with Georgie that "runs pretty deep". Speaking on Captain James's relationship with new character Elvis Harte (Luke Pasqualino), Aldridge described them as longtime "best mates". Explaining how "they used to be rascals", he commented that they were similar in personality, both being cocky but effective soldiers. He teased that the friendship would be tested in the series as Captain James had settled down and wanted Elvis to do the same. Aldridge considered Elvis to be a reminder of his character's "wilder days".

When series three was greenlit, Aldridge teased that it would see Captain James "trying to lose himself in his work" as a method of remaining strong after Elvis's death, noting he was "quietly grieving" underneath. The actor added that the ambiguity of how responsible he was for Elvis's death haunted Captain James throughout the series and would see him beginning to question if a future in the British Army was a good idea for his mental health. When asked how his character's marriage to Molly was going, Aldridge teased bad news for the pair, as constantly being apart would begin to put strain on the relationship. Aldridge commented that Georgie's wellbeing was of "particular concern" to Captain James. After his character sustained a severe injury, Aldridge confirmed that Captain James was not leaving the show. The actor suggested that Captain James could only function in the Army, as "he wouldn't know what to do with his life", and his job gives him "structure and purpose". He added that he considers 2-Section a "family", and it was a reason why his character was so eager to his occupation. The actor teased "tension" with 2-Section's new commanding officer Bones (Olly Rix), as well as Georgie. He teased that his character's relationship with Georgie would blossom after Captain James's return. Aldridge opined that Elvis's death bonded Georgie and Captain James. Explaining how relationship sparked, Aldridge detailed that they were both "wrestling with guilt" over their feelings. He added that Captain James admires Georgie's "boldness" and "courage", adding that she makes him laugh and the two having been through near-death experiences together lot drew them closer to each other quickly.

Aldridge opened up about his character's inner struggles by admitting that Captain James's rejection of his weaknesses. In particular, when the character developed post-traumatic stress disorder, he saw it as a detriment to his work. Aldridge expressed his joy that the show tackled this mentality, commenting that it was "a sensitive issue" in the military, as during research, the actor found many military captains and officers who were struggling mentally, but were "afraid to admit it" due to fearing how it could "jeopardise" their positions. When asked if his character had a future within the Army as a result, Aldridge responded that Captain James had "always taken for granted" how good he is at his job, but his mental health has begun to negatively affect on his ability to make good decisions, concluding that his character was both afraid of and in love with his career, as it is "the only way he knows how to live". When the cast was announced for the fourth series, it was revealed that Aldridge would not return as Captain James. Grounds assured audiences that Captain James survived a cliffhanger at the end of series three and had returned home to work on his marriage to Molly, which Georgie supported him on. It was later confirmed that Aldridge had to leave the series due to having other commitments.

== Storylines ==
Captain James (Ben Aldridge) is introduced as the commanding officer of the unit 2-Section, on a tour in Camp Bastion in Afghanistan. He initially doubts the capabilities of the team's new medic, Molly Dawes (Lacey Turner), but learns to respect her after she saves the life of fellow soldier Smurf (Iwan Rheon) in an act of bravery. Despite Captain James telling her not to, Molly befriends a local girl named Bashira (Becky Eggersglusz), who warns her not to let 2-Section go to a mountain checkpoint, proving to be vital information which impresses him. After Molly returns from her rest and recuperation leave, she confesses her love for him. He reciprocates her feelings, despite having an estranged wife, Rebecca (Alice Patten), and a son. Upon finding out about this, Molly is initially furious but forgives him. Captain James is injured in battle and narrowly survives. Once the tour finishes, he goes on a date with Molly in his hometown of Bath, England. He decides to maintain his relationship with her while remaining in the army after divorcing Rebecca.

After marrying Molly, Captain James offers Lance Corporal Georgie Lane (Michelle Keegan), an experienced army medic, a place on a humanitarian mission in Kenya with 2-Section, which she accepts. After Georgie is taken hostage by a faction of the terrorist group Al-Shabaab, he requests help from the special forces. A unit arrives, and Captain James is shocked to see it being led by his old friend Elvis Harte (Luke Pasqualino), who is also Georgie's ex-fiancé who abandoned her on their wedding day. After they rescue her, 2-Section is granted two days of rest before returning to Britain. When they get home, Captain James offers Georgie a spot on a mission in Syria in five weeks. Although Georgie is open to it, her fiancé Jamie (Royce Pierreson) interferes and tells him not to let her do it to prioritise her mental health. After Georgie tells him she has decided to leave the army, Captain James supports her decision but asks her to reconsider it. He later warns Elvis not to intrude on Georgie's wedding to Jamie.

After an earthquake in Nepal, 2-Section is deployed on a humanitarian mission there, and Captain James arranges for Georgie to mentor new recruit Maisie Richards (Shalom Brune-Franklin). He is annoyed with her behaviour, but after a successful mission manages to see past some of her flaws. When 2-Section is called to Kathmandu barracks, Captain James and Elvis are reacquainted and it transpires that 2-Section will assist special forces on a mission in Afghanistan, to Captain James's reluctance. He cheers up when he meets Captain Azizi (Jonas Khan) again, who asks him to abort the mission out of fear of how the British Army's presence impacts Afghanistan's terrorism. After the mission fails and many are injured, Captain James figures out Captain Azizi was in on it and furiously confronts him before Azizi is accidentally shot by an insurgent. When they eventually retreat to Kabul, Captain James is proud of the team but faces inner struggles regarding the British Army's involvement in Afghanistan. He later witnesses Elvis's death and is saddened by it.

After a tour in Nigeria, 2-Section prepares for a training exercise in Belize. Captain James has received a bad report on his record for being tricked by Captain Azizi, so hopes to prove himself. During the exercise, Captain James is caught in a booby trap which seriously injures his leg, leaving him unable to walk. With lethal drug bandits populating the jungle, Captain James, Georgie, and a local teenage boy named Ezra (James Baller) hide in a cave and wait to be rescued. Captain James's health slowly worsens, as he sees visions of Molly before confessing his marital struggles to Georgie as Molly wants a divorce. After a tense showdown, Captain James is rescued and given rest due to the severe condition of his injury. After six months, their new commanding officer Bones (Olly Rix) is killed on a tour in Bangladesh, with Captain James serving as his replacement. His friendship with Georgie turns romantic during the tour, with the two sleeping together on their last night. After Captain James's departure from the series, he works on repairing his marriage to Molly.

== Reception ==
Ellen E. Jones of The Independent deemed Captain James "posh totty" in the show's first episode. Justin Harp of Digital Spy reported negative reactions to the episode broadcast on 26 June 2018, which showed Captain James admit his infatuation with Georgie. He noted that the show had "pissed off" fans and displayed dismayed Twitter reactions from viewers who preferred Captain James being in a relationship with Molly. Harp agreed with the viewer criticisms and wrote that he expected the show "would know better" than to ruin a long-running couple. Aldridge addressed the negative reactions, noting that audiences "went mental over it" and considered people being "very protective over James and Molly's relationship". He later reported that the plot line had prompted many fans of the show to threaten to stop watching. Suzanna Lazarus of Radio Times opined that the episode put Captain James through "quite an ordeal" and called a leg injury he sustained in it "gruesome". When it was announced that Aldridge had left the series, Lazarus's colleague Ben Allen voiced disappointment that the relationship plot line would be abruptly ended, calling it "anticlimactic".
