= Our Girl series 4 =

Our Girl
- Series 4
- DVD cover
- No. of episodes: 6

Release
- Original network: BBC One
- Original release: 24 March – 28 April 2020

Series chronology
- ← Previous; Series 3

The fourth and final series of the British military drama television series Our Girl began broadcasting on 24 March 2020 on BBC One, and ended on 28 April 2020. The series focused on protagonist Georgie Lane (Michelle Keegan), who had recently been promoted to sergeant, rejoining 2-Section on a tour in Afghanistan, where she is forced to face her own inner demons. It consists of six sixty-minute episodes.

== Production ==
In July 2018, the BBC announced discussions on whether or not to renew to series following a cliffhanger ending to its third series. Series 4 was confirmed in January 2019, and was set to take place one year after series 3. It was set to follow protagonist Georgie Lane, who has been promoted to Sergeant, reluctant to join 2-Section as they return to Afghanistan, and being forced to face her own fears, regrets, and inner demons surrounding her deceased ex-fiance, Elvis Harte. The series was written and created by Tony Grounds, produced by Yvonne Francas, and executive produced by Grounds, Roberto Troni, Hilary Salmon and Mona Qureshi. Salmon teased the new series provided "an opportunity for us to see Georgie in a new stage of her life, as she comes to terms with life without Elvis and reassesses her relationship to the army and the emotional toll it has taken" and was noted "Michelle Keegan will once again star in this new six-part story that is both exciting and moving and contains unexpected twists". The series was set to contain six episodes. Filming began in April 2019 in South Africa and concluded in July, with the series set to begin airing in March 2020.

In January 2019, it was confirmed that Michelle Keegan would reprise her role as Georgie Lane. Otherwise, the series saw a major overhaul as Ben Aldridge's Captain James, alongside Shalom Brune-Franklin's Maisie and Harki Bhambra's Rab, did not return, their spots being taken by Nico Mirallegro, Will Attenborough, Kaine Zajaz, Amy-Leigh Hickman, Josh Bowman, Nabil Elouahabi, Nebras Jamali and Badria Timini were announced to join. Danny-Boy Hatchard was cast as Rhett 'Cheese' Charlton. The character was billed as "cool", "confident", and someone with "many a practical joke up his sleeve".

== Cast ==
=== Main ===
- Michelle Keegan as Georgie Lane
- Will Attenborough as 2nd Lieut. Hurst
- Rolan Bell as Sergeant King
- Sean Sagar as Monk
- Sean Ward as Fingers
- Amy-Leigh Hickman as Mimi
- Kaine Zajaz as Throbber
- Nico Mirallegro as Prof
- Dominic Jephcott as Brigadier
- Nabil Elouahabi as Rabee
- Nebras Jamali as Poya
- Josh Bowman as Dr. Antonio
- Badria Timimi as Dr. Bahil

=== Recurring ===
- Angela Lonsdale as Grace Lane
- Linzey Cocker as Marie Lane
- Bianca Flanders as Doris
- Alrick Meshilinie as Thumper
- Luke Pasqualino as Elvis Harte
- Mia El Chamaa as Giti
- Jack-Parry Jones as Jackson
- Ben Batt as Blue
- Mark Armstrong as Spanner
- David Dennis as Omar
- Danny Hatchard as Cheese
- Lubabalo Tallboy Ntame as Tallboy
- Ruan Van Zyl as Chip
- Kiroshan Naidoo as Zarek

=== Guest ===
- Joan Kempson as Nan
- Sean Gilder as Max Lane
- Genna Galloway as Jules
- Andre Jacobs as Vicar
- Louis Ben de Jager as Derek
- Jenna Saras as Jazz
- Zak Rolands as Boyfriend
- Duane Behrens as Suicide Bomber
- Bianca Amato as Ursula
- Kevin Otto as American DEA Officer
- Bianca Mannie as Afghan Village Wife
- Daniel Lasker as American Soldier
- Huey Louw as Afghan Man
- Assad Zaman as Hasan
- Tristan De Beer as Brigadier's Assistant
- Brent Palmer as Mr Arush
- Sharon Spiegel Wagner as Mrs Arush
- Ruben Engel as Afghan Drug Runner
- Ashwin Albert Arendse as Suicide Bomber
- Lauren Steyn as Female American Officer
- Stefan Erasmus as Taliban Leader
- Francois Marais as Helicopter Pilot
- Pope Jerrod as US General
- Clayton Boyd as CIA Representative
- Liz White as Emma
- Fahruq Valley-Omar as Old Man
- Canto as Flash

== Episodes ==
No. overall	No. in series	Title	Directed by	Written by	Original release date	UK viewers (millions)
23	1	"Episode 1"	Anthony Philipson	Tony Grounds	24 March 2020	5.25
The 2 section prepare to leave for Afghanistan, and Georgie struggles to decide whether or not she should go, due to having flashbacks of Elvis being killed. She supports new recruit Mimi, who is struggling to adjust to how fast paced the army is. Georgie encourages her to call her parents, but when Georgie leaves, Mimi does not call them.
24	2	"Episode 2"	Anthony Philipson	Tony Grounds	31 March 2020	4.69
The team are awoken by the sound of a bomb. They help out at a hospital, where Mimi oversees the recovery of a young girl that needs her leg amputating. She puts up posters to raise awareness of the girl, and while she is not there, the girl's uncle takes her, unaware of her condition. Georgie learns that residents believe the vaccines being given are poisoned. Georgie accompanies Dr. Bahil giving the vaccinations, acting as protection for her. However, the car is hijacked and Dr. Bahil is taken. Poya is dragged out of the car and shot.
25	3	"Episode 3"	Anthony Philipson	Tony Grounds	7 April 2020	4.63
Georgie visits Poya in hospital, but is not allowed to see him due to his condition. The team receive a video message from Dr. Bahil, and Georgie stresses that there is not an active plan to rescue her. Mimi realises that putting up posters of the ill girl in hospital may have led her to be taken by a stranger, and feels guilty. Georgie and Mimi help a woman to give birth while the rest of the team start to find Dr. Bahil. While on the way back to base, they are shot at, and while on the way into the van, Fingers is shot.
26	4	"Episode 4"	Claire Winyard	Tony Grounds	14 April 2020	4.35
The team rush Fingers to a hospital, and while on the way, Georgie helps him to record a message for Marie. The hospital try to save him, but he dies. Georgie flies home to attend his funeral and play his message for Marie. A new soldier, nicknamed Cheese, arrives. He knows Mimi from home, and is shocked to see how she is acting compared to how she acts at home. Georgie is told that she has been restricted to the barracks due them believing she has PTSD.
27	5	"Episode 5"	Claire Winyard	Matt Evans	21 April 2020	4.29
Georgie is sent to Emma, a clinical psychologist, to talk through whether she feels able to return to her full duties. After three sessions, Emma concludes that Georgie does not have PTSD, but is grieving over Elvis. Realising Mimi is lying about her parents' occupation, Cheese promises her to stay quiet about her identity.
28	6	"Episode 6"	Claire Winyard	Tony Grounds	28 April 2020	4.49
Mimi and Poya are sent to the hospital to perform medical duties, but when Mimi walks in on Poya with a suicide bomb strapped to his chest, she refuses to leave him. She talks him down by revealing her home life; her mother was a heroin addict and she was born addicted to heroin, and her adoptive parents put her back in care when they had their own child. She succeeds in making him stand down, but he is shot. Georgie finds the man responsible for Elvis' death, and him begging to be killed, Georgie leaves him. Talking about heaven with Prof, Georgie sets her engagement ring from Elvis off into the sky on a kite.
