= Our Girl series 2 =

Our Girl
- Series 2
- DVD cover
- No. of episodes: 5

Release
- Original network: BBC One
- Original release: 7 September – 5 October 2016

Series chronology
- ← Previous; Series 1 Next → Series 3

The second series of the British military drama television series Our Girl began broadcasting on 7 September 2016 on BBC One, and ended on 5 October 2016. The series follows the show's new protagonist, Georgie Lane (Michelle Keegan) through a humanitarian mission in Kenya which soon takes a turn for the worse. It consists of five sixty-minute episodes.

== Production ==
In June 2015, it was announced that a second series of Our Girl had entered production, set to follow 2-Section through "a risky mission in Kenya". The second series was commissioned by Charlotte Moore and Polly Hill. Executive producers were announced to be Caroline Skinner and Tony Grounds, and directors by Jan Matthys and Luke Snellin. Grounds, who wrote the show's pilot and first series also returned as writer, and expressed excitement to write the new series, teasing it was set to take place in a Kenyan refugee camp, the biggest one in the world, close to the Kenya/Somalia border, and focus on the conflict between the countries. Grounds called it "both daunting and exciting" to have a new series of Our Girl enter production. The protagonist originating from Manchester was incorporated as the actress Keegan was from there, with Grounds commenting: "it was good to write for her voice".

Grounds based the new series in Kenya as he found its ongoing conflict with Somalia to be "an incredible setting for drama" after researching it thoroughly, and the characters would have never "faced anything like the situation they are confronted with". Actor Ben Aldridge confirmed that the refugee camp in the show was based on Dadaab. His co-star and lead actress Michelle Keegan also confirmed that the mission was a humanitarian one and would last over a six-week period for 2-Section, and that the new series would contain nods to the original one. It was teased that the characters would quickly find the mission to be "full of surprises". Further announcements confirmed the season would be composed of five sixty-minute episodes that were set to air on BBC One in late 2016. The first trailer for the series was released in June 2016.

Like the first series, series 2 was also filmed near Cape Town in South Africa, despite being set in different countries. Skinner explained that the reason why "it looks so different on screen" was because "the cast and crew decamped to dustier, desert-like just terrain 20 minutes outside of Cape Town". Skinner added that South Africa was "an incredible place to film", "was really hot and very sunny, which is exactly what you want when you're trying to recreate Kenya", and had "magical" lighting. The Kenyan refugee camp in the show was a township in real life, with locals being used as extras. Series 2 began filming in January 2016.

To train for the series, actors had to attend boot camp in the UK for a few weeks, which Keegan was surprised wasn't as bad as she expected: "I was a bit worried because I'd heard it was quite strict due to the army and what they have to go through. It was great fun and a bonding exercise for everyone to get to know each other before we flew out to South Africa". After that, they did another week of boot camp in South Africa to acclimatise the cast to the heat and uniforms. Advisors were employed for military accuracy and to support the cast through the physical demands. Keegan was initially "worried" about filming in South Africa due to not being good in heat, but was thankful to film in a cooler time of the year. The actress also stated: "I was working six days a week, in every single scene, so I had no time to miss home. It was one of those experiences where you look back and think what an experience of a lifetime, I loved every single minute". Keegan performed several of her own stunts, calling it "very physical" and finding it "liberating", despite admitting it was "quite extreme". She was also surprised at how heavy the weapons used were and it was the first time the actress had held or operated a gun.

In September 2014, it was announced that Lacey Turner, who played protagonist Molly Dawes in the first series, had left the show to return to her role on EastEnders. In June 2015, it was announced that, as a result, Michelle Keegan had been cast as Georgie Lane, an army medic and the show's new protagonist for its second series. As a "massive fan" of the series, Keegan expressed excitement to play Georgie. Billed by the BBC as "gutsy, passionate and unstoppable", Georgie is an army medic like Molly who is fiercely dedicated to her job and "relishes the adrenaline and adventure that working with the army brings". Keegan commented that wearing the uniform for the first time felt "quite surreal", but it immediately gave her a "sense of duty", as if she were a member of the army. Keegan described her character as follows: "Georgie is an experienced army medic. She is good at her job, very professional and she knows what she wants in her life. Georgie puts her work first and not afraid to get stuck in, especially with the lads as well. I wouldn't say she is the alpha, but she doesn't take anything lying down".

Luke Pasqualino was announced to portray a new character, Georgie's ex-fiance Elvis Harte, a Special Forces commander of the SAS group. He was billed as "cheeky", "fearless", "impulsive", and "cool under pressure". Pasqualino noted that Elvis "knows how good he is" at his job and aspires to "make the world a better place", adding that his character has "a lot of bravado, a lot of cheekiness and a lot of cockiness about him but at the end of the day, he gets his end goal finished and he gets you the result". Grounds and actor Ben Aldridge teased a return of Captain James, which was eventually confirmed in March 2016. The BBC called Captain James an "army man to the core" and "totally committed to his work". Aldridge explained his characters' established relationships with Georgie and Elvis, as Georgie is a friend of Molly's and "still manages to impress and surprise him" and Captain James and Elvis "go way back and have been on tour together more than once". When asked if he had changed from the first series, Aldridge responded "he's slightly more war-weary" as "Molly started him on this ethical debate with himself" the previous series.

Other new cast announcements included Royce Pierreson as Dr Jamie Cole, a "warm and sensible" doctor in love with Georgie, Rolan Bell as Sergeant King, Sean Sagar as Monk, Anthony Oseyemi as the Kenyan forces' Captain Osman, Anna Tenta as Kicki, a Swiss woman who "fell in love with a career in humanitarian relief work", Yusra Warsama as Nafula, Kicki's "passionate and hard-working" co-worker, and Michael James as Jason Raynott, "a lonely chid growing up" who became interested in Islam in later life.

== Cast ==
=== Main ===
- Michelle Keegan as Georgie Lane
- Luke Pasqualino as Elvis Harte
- Ben Aldridge as Captain James
- Royce Pierreson as Dr Jamie Cole
- Anthony Oseyemi as Captain Osman
- Yusra Warsama as Nafula
- Anna Tenta as Kicki
- Michael James as Abu Jaseer

=== Recurring ===
- Angela Lonsdale as Grace Lane
- Sean Gilder as Max Lane
- Linzey Cocker as Marie Lane
- Molly Wright as Lulu Lane
- Joan Kempson as Nan
- Rolan Bell as Sergeant King
- Nick Preston as Mansfield Mike
- Sean Sagar as Monk
- Simon Lennon as Brains
- Lawrence Walker as Dangleberries
- Sean Ward as Fingers
- Hlayani Mambasa as Zeki
- Sizwesandile Mnisi as Gaani
- Mark Armstrong as Spanner
- Jed O'Hagan as Spunky
- Jack Parry-Jones as Jackson
- Guy Oliver-Watts as Brigadier Baxter
- Chris New as Detective Inspector William
- Amir Rahimzadeh as Al Shwadify

=== Guest ===
- Mark Beswick as Cox
- Lee Werswick as Jenkinson
- Likho Mango as Jomo
- Abdi Mohamud Osman as Sadiq
- Jenny Wambaa as Doctor
- Tom Fairfoot as Major Hare
- Matt Newman as Captain Payne
- Michelle Asante as Doctor Duma
- Paul Sloss as Border Control
- Nick Rogers as Man in Shopping Centre
- Lucy Aarden as Debbie
- Kemi-Bo Jacobs as Prof Judy Lowe
- Colin Parry as Close Protection Officer
- Judith Barker as Lady on Bus
- Clara Onyemere as Faith
- Peter Landi as Gary
- Caroline O'Neill as Stella
- Lesley Molony as Lady Vendor
- Dinita Gohil as Saira Abbasi
- Alexander Ellis as Dr Weston

== Episodes ==
No. overall	No. in series	Title	Directed by	Written by	Original release date	UK viewers (millions)
6	1	"Lane"	Jan Matthys	Tony Grounds	7 September 2016	6.23
Two years after being stood up at her wedding, Lance Corporal Georgie Lane, an experienced army medic, is offered a place on a humanitarian mission in Kenya, which entails working closely with NGOs and helping those in a refugee camp near the Somali border, by Captain James. Her new fiancé Jamie, a doctor, agrees to let her go as long as they get married soon after she returns home. She accepts and 2-Section travels to Nairobi, Kenya the following day. Immediately upon arrival, an explosion in the camp injures many. As a medic, Georgie does her best to help, alongside aid worker Kicki, who has run a charity hospital across the border for over a decade. That night, Kicki is taken hostage by a faction of Al-Shabaab. While treating a young boy, Georgie notices his father wearing Kicki's watch and becomes determined to find her. As eyewitness reports have seen the man frequenting an Al-Shabaab dwelling, 2-Section plan to raid the place. Georgie learns that Kicki was kept there for an unknown amount of time but has since been moved. While riding in an ambulance with the man, who was injured during his apprehension, hoping he can give answers when he wakes, the vehicle is ambushed and Georgie is kidnapped by Al-Shabaab.
7	2	"Going On"	Jan Matthys	Tony Grounds	14 September 2016	6.23
Georgie is taken hostage and begs the group to keep her alive. Thinking quickly, Georgie tells her captors she is a doctor, but not that she is part of the military, so they spare her to treat their injured and make her film a video telling the British Army to leave Kenya. She is later transferred to a compound where she is kept in a cell with a terrified Kicki. Captain James requests help from a special forces unit to storm the base where Georgie is being held but is shocked to discover that Elvis, Georgie's ex-fiancé who left her on the wedding day, is leading the operation. Captain James and Elvis are also old friends and Elvis reinforces his dedication to finding Georgie, which Captain James can tell is personally motivated. Georgie and Kicki try escaping while their captors pray, but their attempt is unsuccessful and they are told they will be executed soon. Georgie fashions an infrared signal using a TV remote, which works as 2-Section receives it and plans an airstrike on the compound to rescue her. After it is discovered that Georgie is a soldier, Kicki is shot dead for knowing about it and not saying anything, with the terrorists deciding to film Georgie's murder the next day. With the help of 2 Section, Elvis' unit mounts an attack on the base and manages to bring Georgie to safety.
8	3	"Look Now"	Jan Matthys	Tony Grounds	21 September 2016	6.06
Georgie is furious to see Elvis again. While 2-Section celebrates her return, Georgie is required to identify insurgents. She identifies various members, including a radical convert named Jason Raynott, who goes by 'Abu'. The information helps Special Forces to coordinate a successful air strike on their suspected holding ground. Georgie visits Nafula, Kicki's co-worker, to encourage her to stay resilient before Captain James announces that 2-Section has been granted two days rest before returning home to Britain. The beach is attacked as a robbery turns into a shootout, and while Georgie is shot at, Elvis tackles the man off a ledge, killing him. An exhausted Georgie can't wait to get home to see her family and fiancė, but unable to hide his feelings any longer, a desperate Elvis is forced to come clean. He tells her privately that on the day he left her at the wedding, a woman named Debbie told him he had a daughter, and Elvis was forced to make a quick decision between Georgie and his child. They sleep together on their last night before 2-Section returns home. Georgie is told that in five weeks, there will be a mission to Syria, and Captain James offers her a spot. Georgie returns and is thrilled to see her family again, unaware that Abu has also returned to the UK.
9	4	"Ready"	Luke Snellin	Tony Grounds	28 September 2016	5.79
Suffering from visions and the guilt of cheating, Georgie passively plans her wedding but is surprised when Elvis summons her to a private meeting in Whitehall with Special Branch. As Jamie is going to London for business, Georgie tags along under the guise of wanting to shop there. As Jamie grows increasingly concerned about Georgie's welfare, he seeks out Captain James and tells him Georgie is ill and needs rest, and he doesn't want her to go on any more tours. Intel suggests that Abu escaped the air strike in Kenya and has re-entered the country on a false passport, so they decide to investigate CCTV in areas where Georgie envisioned him. Once back in Manchester, Georgie and Jamie's relationship gets increasingly strained as he discovers she slept with Elvis on rest, despite him leaving her, so Jamie decides to postpone the wedding. Georgie's whole family encourage her to leave the army and marry Jamie. Elvis and his unit are called to assist when intel suggests that Abu and his associates are to carry out a series of coordinated terrorist attacks across Manchester and while most of the attackers are caught, Abu escapes once again. A frustrated Georgie turns Elvis away and decides to heed her family's advice to leave the army and marry Jamie.
10	5	"Afterwards"	Luke Snellin	Tony Grounds	5 October 2016	6.03
Georgie and Jamie prepare for their big day, and despite Captain James asking her to reconsider leaving, she tells him her mind is made up. Captain James also warns Elvis not to try and intrude on the celebration and tells him he knows that it is why he is now in Manchester. Although she is excited, Georgie isn't able to extinguish the thought of Abu still being free to roam the streets and worries he is up to something. Abu's mother wants to speak to Georgie to apologise to her, and during their eventual exchange, she mentions Abu's ex-girlfriend Saira. Georgie talks to Saira, who tells her that she introduced Abu to Islam during their relationship before he became an extremist. Elvis worries Abu will target her wedding ceremony, so tries to initially postpone the wedding for a few days. Elvis confesses that he still loves George and wants to stop the wedding. On her wedding day, Georgie figures out that Abu is actually planning to target Saira's university graduation as revenge for breaking up with him. Georgie, with the help of Elvis, stops Abu from bombing the place and he is shot dead after shooting Elvis. Elvis survives and Georgie apologises to Jamie for leaving him at the altar, but explains that she can't settle down. Jamie leaves her. Georgie later returns to Kenya to help Nafula, promising to return to the army in the future.
