= Our Girl series 1 =

Our Girl
- Series 1
- DVD cover
- No. of episodes: 5

Release
- Original network: BBC One
- Original release: 21 September – 19 October 2014

Series chronology
- Next → Series 2

The first series of the British military drama television series Our Girl began broadcasting on 21 September 2014 on BBC One, and ended on 19 October 2014. The series continues the story of the show's pilot episode, as protagonist Molly Dawes (Lacey Turner) navigates becoming a soldier at Camp Bastion in Afghanistan. It consists of five sixty-minute episodes.

== Production ==
In March 2013, the writer of the show's pilot episode teased that he would enjoy working on the show if the BBC commissioned it. When the pilot, which aired in March 2013, proved successful, the team were given the green light and the first series was put into production. It was announced in December 2013, with Lacey Turner set to reprise her role from the pilot and was due to follow her character "during her first deployment as an army medic while the British Army withdraw from Afghanistan". BBC One controller Charlotte Moore teased the new series: "Our Girl is a rite-of-passage story about a young soldier beautifully captured by Lacey Turner. In the same year when our British troops withdraw from Afghanistan, the series will follow the extreme life-changing experiences she is forced to face both on tour and when she returns back home".

When writing the series, Grounds wanted to write it from the perspective of foot soldiers in Afghanistan, involving looking at things from their point-of-view. His decision to keep Molly as the focus was justified as he found it interesting to write from the perspective of a newer recruit. He added that the series "opens up much more potential" to explore the issues of soldiers and veterans in the British Army. When asked his hopes on what viewers would take from the series, Grounds responded: "You just want them to understand what it must be like going out there as a young person, to feel what Molly must feel like to be suddenly thrown into this bewildering new world. It's more than just joining the army. You want the audience to sympathise with the soldiers but also love Afghanistan as well with a bit of hope and a way forward". The series was commissioned by Moore and Ben Stephenson. Caroline Skinner and Grounds were brought in as executive producers and Ken Horn returned from the pilot as producer. The series was directed by Anthony Philipson and Richard Senior.

Despite being set in Afghanistan, the series was filmed in the Bontebok National Park in South Africa over a 49-day period. Three sets were built for the series; a forward operating base, an Afghan village, and Camp Bastion, but the weather conditions caused multiple problems on set. Horn noted that the winds were very strong on some days, to the point that set buildings were blown over, with "specialist teams" being brought in to attach steel hawsers that would act as guy ropes to keep the sets from getting damages further. He mentioned that the British Army don't face such problems in real life as they make walls out of rock and gravel, while those on set were constructed using straw. Caroline Skinner later explained: "for the first series we used the mountains of the wine region, which are very similar to Helmand Province for Afghanistan".

Actors underwent boot camp training for preparation to play their characters, the first phase went on for fourteen weeks, plus an additional six months of specialist training in their character's area. The second phase of boot camp was in South Africa and involved getting used to the climate, particularly due to the heavy uniforms and long hours. Grounds appreciated the off-screen chemistry between the cast members, explaining: "They honestly became like a real section. They were thrown together for six months, not having met before, and, as with the army, what happens in that six months could change their lives. They went through a short but intense period of training to get their heads into army life, and had to retain that focus throughout the shoot. They had to get on, bond and work together so that they became like a real platoon. We tried to utilise their youthful energy and it definitely worked to our advantage".

Grounds teased that the series would showcase "how the deployment really makes [Molly] grow up", as despite being awestruck by Afghanistan's beauty, she would be changed forever by the experience. Turner added that her character "changed quite a lot really from the beginning", having grown up, finished her training and emotionally matured, while retaining traits of "disobedience", "feistiness", "fight", and "passion". Ben Aldridge was cast as Captain Charles James, 2-Section's commanding officer. Aldridge described his character as "an interesting mix of authority and fun" with a "laissez-faire attitude" and is "happy in the presence of his lads", but takes his role "very seriously". Grounds added that Molly would fall "madly in love" with him, seeing him as "a whole different level to the boyfriends she's had before". Iwan Rheon was cast as 'Smurf', a character "at the heart of the platoon" and the "conflicted" "golden boy of the section". He described the platoon as being "close-knit" and teased that Smurf would become "smitten" with Molly throughout the series. After filming concluded, Turner left Our Girl to return to her role on EastEnders.

== Cast ==
=== Main ===
- Lacey Turner as Molly Dawes
- Arinze Kene as Corporal Kinders
- Iwan Rheon as Dylan 'Smurf' Smith
- Lawrence Walker as Dangleberries
- Simon Lennon as Brains
- Nick Preston as Mansfield Mike
- Sean Ward as Fingers
- Ade Oyefeso as Nude-Nut
- Charley Palmer Merkell as Baz Vegas
- Ben Aldridge as Captain James
- Kirsty Averton as Jackie
- Becky Eggersglusz as Bashira
- Tamer Burjaq as Sohail
- Zaubin Varla as Qaseem

=== Recurring ===
- Kerry Godliman as Belinda Dawes
- Flossy Grounds as Bella Dawes
- Sean Gallagher as Dave Dawes
- Adam Astill as Major Beck
- Jonas Khan as Captain Azizi
- Aubrey Shelton as Badrai
- Shu'Aib Ally as Rolex Boy
- Keenan Arrison as Taj
- Siwan Morris as Candy
- Ruth Sheen as Nan

=== Guest ===
- Molly Logan as Corporal Drake
- Steven Elder as Major Brice
- Richard Sutton as Corporal Jackman
- Craig Hawks as Corporal Jenkins
- Laura Hopper as Sara
- Nigel Partington as Bastion doctor
- Kira Wilkinson as Bashira's mother
- Abdi Hussein as singer
- Tilly Vosburgh as Shazza
- Connor Allen as Jason
- Faye Winter as Coffee Shop Assistant
- Dineo Moeketsi as American Surgeon
- Farshid Rokey as Zemaray
- Paul Du Toit as Major Morley
- Nathan Fredericks as Ramazan Ali
- Lyle Davis as Goat farmer
- Khalil Kathrada as Driver
- George Turner as Sam
- Lorna Anderson as Nurse
- Alice Patten as Rebecca

== Episodes ==
No. overall	No. in series	Title	Directed by	Written by	Original release date	UK viewers (millions)
1	1	"Time"	Anthony Philipson	Tony Grounds	21 September 2014	5.22
Molly has been training for more than a year now but is still thrown when she is told she is about to be sent to Camp Bastion in Afghanistan. She is sorted into 2-section, a team where she is the only woman, led by Corporal Kinders. With no time to say goodbye or consider what she is about to travel into, Molly finds herself with immediate adversaries in the forms of her fellow soldier 'Smurf', an ex-fling, and her commanding officer, Captain James, who doubts her competence as an army medic. Molly struggles to deal with the heat and the sight of serious injuries and begins doubting herself. On her tour of duty, Molly meets and bonds with a local girl named Bashira. She is further dismayed to learn Smurf disclosed private information about her. While the team travels and Molly becomes acquainted with allies in the Afghan National Army, Smurf is shot by an insurgent while on a minefield and urgently needs a medic. Despite being told not to, Molly steps on to the minefield, risking her life, to tend to Smurf's wounds before he is airlifted by a helicopter and survives the ordeal. Smurf apologises to Molly and she begins to earn Captain James's respect.
2	2	"Feelings"	Anthony Philipson	Tony Grounds	28 September 2014	4.90
Smurf returns to the team following his recovery and notices Molly becoming close with Captain James, which annoys him as he has an active interest in her. Molly sees Bashira not in school and is horrified to learn that Bashira is engaged in an arranged marriage. She is threatened by an ally who is against girls attending school, afterwards, Captain James tells her not to get involved with civilians. As it is full of insurgents, 2-Section plans to remain a presence in the village so the children can attend school. Bashira is found with a severe injury to her eye and when Molly treats it Bashira discloses that her father beat her for becoming close to Molly and warns Molly of a possible attack at the mountain checkpoint the next day. Her close relationship with Bashira makes the warning credible as Captain James heeds the warning, saving everyone from an explosion. Despite surviving, Molly worries that Bashira will be punished by her father Badrai for disclosing the information. After surveillance monitoring Bashira's house hears actions will be taken, the team return to the village the next day and finds Bashira with a vest of bombs strapped to her. While the vest is removed, Molly keeps Bashira calm before Bashira is taken to a new family in Kabul.
3	3	"Changes"	Richard Senior	Tony Grounds	5 October 2014	4.81
After being asked to examine and confirm the death of a teenage boy, Molly becomes traumatised after witnessing the bloody sight. Molly is told that she will be released on rest and recuperation leave, and before doing so, she affectionately promises that she will come back to Captain James. Once back in Britain, Smurf offers her a ride with his mother, where she is told the mental toll Smurf's involvement in the army has on the family as his brother died in the army. Molly returns home to see that her family are growing apart without her. She visits Smurf in Newport, and they bond over their shared difficulties and trauma, but both wish they were back in Afghanistan. As they grow closer, Smurf reveals he has fallen for Molly, but while she doesn't return his feelings, she promises to go to Las Vegas with him. Before the end of her leave, Molly advises her parents to listen to each other if they want to fix their marriage. Upon returning to Afghanistan, Captain James is unhappy that Molly visited Smurf during her leave. While the team relocate, Molly confesses her love for Captain James before they find a heavily beaten ally, Sohail, on the road, who Molly nurses before he tells her that he was beaten by the Taliban for refusing to kill her.
4	4	"Love"	Richard Senior	Tony Grounds	12 October 2014	5.28
The platoon, preparing to withdraw from Afghanistan, is bored in Camp Bastion. Smurf tells Molly that he received a letter from his mother saying she had a premonition that he would die in battle. The team gain information that Badrai is hiding in a Taliban stronghold, and as Molly is the only one who has seen his face, she has to go on the mission. When they go, they don't find Badrai and Molly is struck across the face by an insurgent. When she confronts him, he reveals that he is Badrai's son and Bashira's brother and that he struck her out of anger for tearing the family apart. The man hints that Badrai is going to Kabul with bombs. Molly relays the information to the platoon, and before they go to a checkpoint to stop him, she overhears Smurf asking Captain James for advice on how to propose to Molly, learning that Captain James is married to a woman named Rebecca and has a son with her, which infuriates her. She confides her worries in Smurf, and he gives her his mother's engagement ring as a sign of their friendship. 2-Section reaches the checkpoint, and Captain James tells Molly that he and his wife have split up before they share a kiss. The team are attacked by Badrai, who shoots Captain James and Smurf. After tending to their wounds, Molly shoots Badrai, killing him.
5	5	"Heroes"	Anthony Philipson	Tony Grounds	19 October 2014	4.92
2-Section return home from Afghanistan and are greeted by their families. Molly is pleased to see her parents on better terms. Instead of returning home, she goes to Birmingham Hospital, where Captain James and Smurf are being kept. Smurf has seemingly made a recovery, but Captain James is in critical condition. Molly and Smurf wait up all night in the hospital for him. When he wakes up and Molly visits him, they are interrupted by Rebecca and his son, Sam. After they leave, Captain James tells Molly that he is willing to resign his commission to be with her. At an awards ceremony, Molly is awarded the Military Cross for her courage before she and Captain James have their first date in his hometown, Bath, where he tells her he will stay with the army regardless. Later, she promises Smurf that they will go to Las Vegas together as friends, but he collapses during their day out. Molly is later told that he died of bleeding in his brain that he was unaware of. At his funeral, Molly decides she will go on a short tour in Afghanistan, where she is relieved to see Bashira okay and living happily. Molly begins training medics in Afghanistan and continues to pursue her relationship with Captain James after he divorces Rebecca.
