= Family Business (British TV series) =

British television series

- Genre: Drama
- Created by: Tony Grounds
- Written by: Tony Grounds; Chris Dunlop
- Directed by: Sarah Harding; Tom Shankland
- Starring: Jamie Foreman; Elizabeth Berrington; Michael Tucek; Meg Wynn Owen; Trevor Peacock; Abbie Nichols; Claire Rushbrook
- Composer: Simon Rogers
- Country of origin: United Kingdom
- Original language: English
- No. of series: 1
- No. of episodes: 6

Production
- Executive producers: Greg Brenman; Rebecca De Souza; Gareth Neame
- Producer: Barney Reisz
- Cinematography: Simon Kossoff
- Editor: Tim Murrell
- Running time: 50 minutes
- Production company: Tiger Aspect Productions

Original release
- Network: BBC One
- Release: 11 February – 17 March 2004

Family Business is a six-part British television drama series, created and written by playwright Tony Grounds, that first broadcast on BBC One on 11 February 2004. The series stars Jamie Foreman and Elizabeth Berrington as Marky and Jessica Brooker, the proprietors of a family-run building firm who, after years of hard work and graft, are due to move into the family home of their dreams – until the day of the move is unexpectedly rocked by the disappearance of their eldest child, James (Michael Tucek). The series was directed by Tom Shankland and Sarah Harding.

The series broadcast over six consecutive weeks, with the concluding episode on 17 March 2004. The series is yet to be released on DVD.

== Inspiration ==
Tony Grounds said that the series was inspired by the builders who did up his house a few years prior to the series. "I had to get my house done up and I wondered about the significant reasons why people do that. Has someone died? Are they expecting a baby and need more space? Are they having a home refurbished to sell? And I thought that some builders must be privy to seeing families in quite heightened states."

== Production ==
Tony Grounds said of the series' premise; "Everyone thinks that their family is imperfect, except Marky Brooker, whose family is so 'perfect' it's falling apart in front of his eyes and he can't see it. Family Business puts the modern British suburban family under the microscope." Greg Brenman, Head of Drama at Tiger Aspect, added: "On the surface, the Brookers are an ordinary family – close-knit loving and supportive of each other. Look a little closer, and the cracks begin to show."

BBC Head of Drama Commissioning, Gareth Neame, added: "We've been enthusiastic about working with Tony Grounds on a show about the modern British family for some time and we're delighted that Family Business will be his first drama series for BBC One. Tony's idiosyncratic style and his singular way of looking at the way we choose to live our lives make it a perfect accompaniment to other recent contemporary commissions."

== Cast ==
- Jamie Foreman as Marky Brooker
- Elizabeth Berrington as Jessica Brooker
- Michael Tucek as James Brooker
- Meg Wynn Owen as Iris Brooker
- Trevor Peacock as Arthur Brooker
- Abbie Nichols as Lauren Brooker
- Claire Rushbrook as Rachel Brooker
- Ian Burfield as Mr. Adkins
- Danny Dyer as Yankie
- Ronnie Fox as Jethro
- Grace Monchar as Tulip

== Episodes ==
No.	Title	Directed by	Written by	Airdate
1	"Episode 1"	Tom Shankland	Tony Grounds	11 February 2004
The Brookers' delight at moving into a dream home is offset by the disappearance of their son, while a young couple need work done after a tragic accident.
2	"Episode 2"	Tom Shankland	Tony Grounds	18 February 2004
Marky and the boys discover an elderly man living in a rundown house they assumed was derelict.
3	"Episode 3"	Tom Shankland	Chris Dunlop	25 February 2004
Marky discovers the secret life of a man who owns two houses, and Lauren has a revelation of her own.
4	"Episode 4"	Sarah Harding	Tony Grounds	3 March 2004
Marky puts his family in jeopardy when he grows concerned for a troubled teenager's welfare.
5	"Episode 5"	Sarah Harding	Tony Grounds	10 March 2004
Marky cracks under pressure and goes Awol.
6	"Episode 6"	Sarah Harding	Tony Grounds	17 March 2004
Marky's family are overjoyed to find James again, but his reappearance triggers a series of shocking revelations.
