= Molly Dawes =

Fictional character from Our Girl

- Our Girl character
- First appearance: "Pilot"; 24 March 2013
- Last appearance: "Heroes"; 19 October 2014
- Created by: Tony Grounds
- Portrayed by: Lacey Turner

In-universe information
- Occupation: Nail technician; Army medic
- Affiliation: British Army
- Spouse: Captain James (husband)
- Parents: Dave Dawes (father); Belinda Dawes (mother)

Molly Dawes is a fictional character from the BBC military drama Our Girl, played by Lacey Turner. Molly first appeared in the pilot episode of the show, first broadcast on 24 March 2013, and serves as the protagonist of the first series. Molly was initially introduced as a young beautician from a dysfunctional home life who becomes inspired to join the British Army as a combat medic. Molly's storylines in the series have included breaking away from her troubled home, her success and struggles in the army, and being involved in a love triangle with Dylan 'Smurf' Smith (Iwan Rheon) and her eventual husband Captain James (Ben Aldridge).

Molly has been described as tough, feisty, determined, and courageous. To play the character, Turner had to undergo rigorous training, which she appreciated the challenges of, despite describing the filming experience as difficult. During the preparation, she also spoke with several female recruits and noticed that many of them came from similarly troubled backgrounds to Molly. After the first series finished filming, Turner left the show to return to her role as Stacey Slater on EastEnders. Molly's character was written out as a result, with a new character, Georgie Lane (Michelle Keegan), filling the role of the protagonist for the remainder of the series. Series writer Tony Grounds was vocal about his hopes of Turner returning to the role. Turner's portrayal and Molly's character garnered generally positive critical reception.

== Development ==
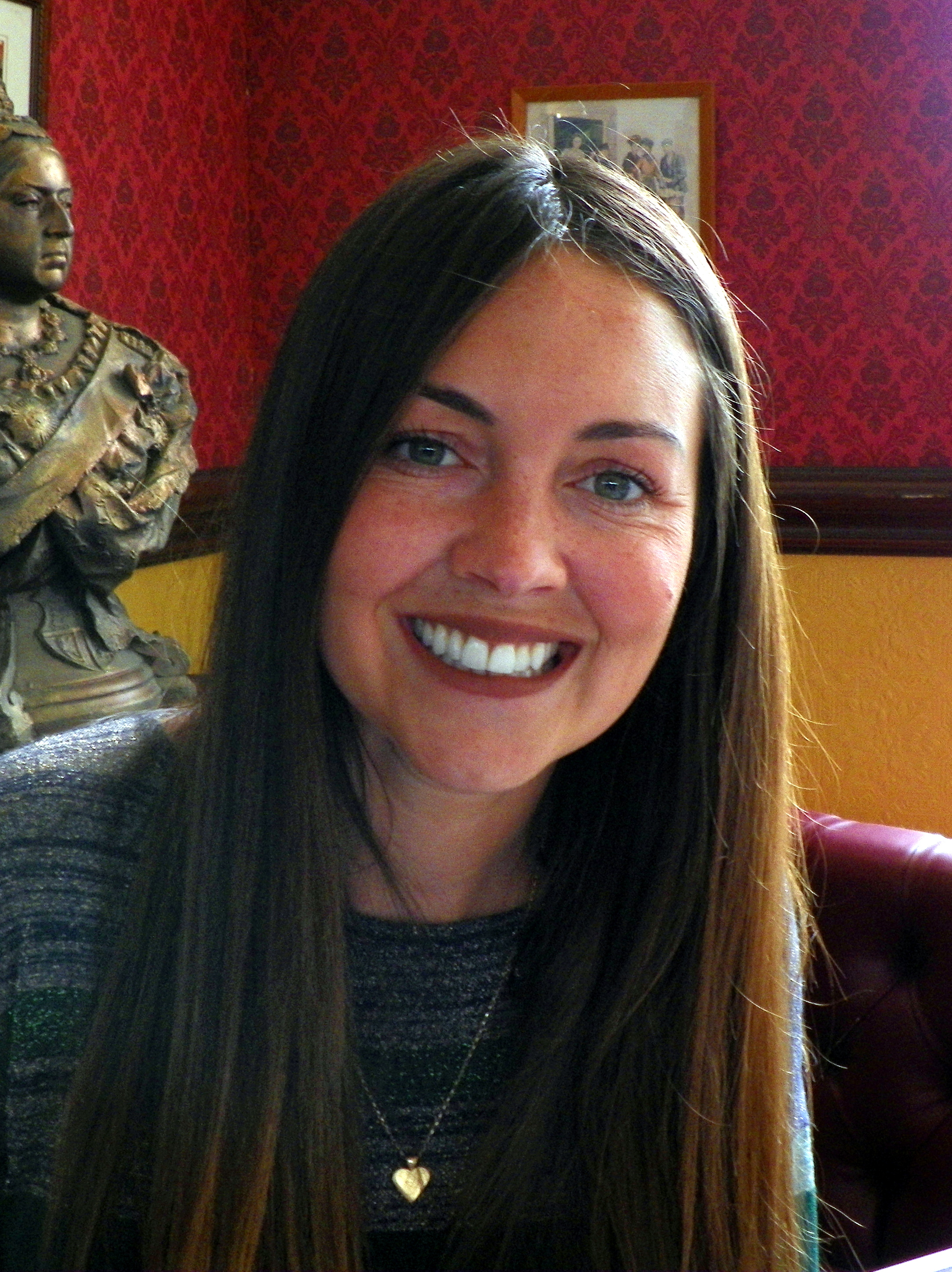
Lacey Turner (pictured) plays Molly Dawes.

In October 2012, it was announced that actress Lacey Turner would star as Molly, a young woman "with little future" who joins the Royal Army Medical Corps, for the show's pilot. After her casting was announced, Turner explained that Molly had always dreamed of being accepted, leading her to want "something more" from life. A spokesperson for the BBC billed Molly as "colourful", "unique" and "powerful", comparing Molly to Turner's EastEnders character, Stacey Slater. Turner described Molly as "interesting", admiring her traits of "strength" and "determination", and noting that Molly is "a tough cookie" and "quite a mouthy character". Turner opined that her character is "a girl who you cannot help but love" and expressed excitement to be a part of the project. The army training was "tough" for Molly at first, as Turner explained she is "not the type of person who takes orders", but it changes her for the better. To play Molly, Turner herself had to prepare, which included improving her fitness and being trained in marching, weapons, and medics. After watching real soldiers undergo their basic training, the actress joked that she wouldn't be able to join the army herself. Turner was surprised by the number of women at the training, considering it an "eye-opener" and adding that many of the women came from similar backgrounds to Molly. Turner considered herself "too much of a wimp" to join the army, explaining that she could handle the preparation, but would be "too scared" to go to war.

The show was picked up as a series, with Turner reprising her role as Molly. Turner was enthusiastic to return, explaining: "I love Molly. She's feisty, she's disobedient and she's passionate which I think is what draws me to her. She has a passion to belong and she wants to do better and help". Turner admired how "ballsy" and "fearless" Molly was, and appreciated how the series allowed viewers to "see her grow into a woman". She suggested that Molly considered the army as an "opportunity to become part of a team and a family" and to "feel like she belongs", in contrast to her home life. Turner teased that the series would show a "more grown up" Molly, despite noting that Molly would maintain her "disobedience", "feistiness", "fight", and "passion". She admitted that while filming, she felt like an "outcast" due to being the only woman on the cast, but she noted that it helped her identify with Molly, who was in the same situation in the show. Turner considered that the biggest challenge of playing a central character was that she was in "pretty much every scene", however, she found it "an exciting challenge" and thought of it as being "just about getting it right". The actress hoped that she had accurately depicted soldiers at war. As the series took place in Afghanistan and was filmed in South Africa, Turner expressed that the heat was one of the hardest aspects of filming, especially given the heavy uniform, but admitted that she found the challenge "fun". She also opined that the abundance of crickets made filming difficult, noting: "They were everywhere".

After the first series of Our Girl finished filming, Turner returned to her EastEnders role, which she described as a "risk" as reprising her role as Stacey would mean she wouldn't be able to return to her role as Molly. Despite this, writer Tony Grounds voiced hope that Turner would return if a second series was greenlit: "I'd love to see more Molly Dawes". When the second series of Our Girl was greenlit in June 2015, it was announced that Michelle Keegan had been cast as Georgie Lane, who would take over the role of protagonist from Molly. Turner commented that she had "an amazing time making Our Girl and taking Molly on her journey", but explained that she was too "busy working on EastEnders" to continue her role, adding that she was certain that "Tony [Grounds would] write a fantastic [second] series full of action and drama with great characters". Grounds was vocal about his ability to write Molly back into the series should Turner ever want to return, commenting: "If she ever wanted to do it she's only got to ring me up". However, he noted that the actress's EastEnders commitments would have made it difficult to film abroad.

== Storylines ==
Molly, a young nail technician, lives in an impoverished and troubled area in East London with her parents Dave (Sean Gallagher) and Belinda Dawes (Kerry Godliman) and her five younger siblings. On her eighteenth birthday, she decides that she wants more in life. She becomes inspired to join the army and applies to become a combat medic. Molly is initially unsuccessful in physicality tests, performs poorly in training, and is rude towards her instructors, almost quitting early on. However, she befriends another woman named Katy (Katherine Pearce) and eventually gains respect from her new instructor Corporal Geddings (Matthew McNulty). Her father enforces that her family disown her for joining the army, but when Molly graduates and begs her mother to attend her passing out, she is visited by her. Belinda apologises for Dave's actions and encourages Molly to remain with the army.

Over a year later, Molly is told she is being sent to Camp Bastion in Afghanistan to fight the Taliban with her new team, 2-Section, who are all men. Molly quickly finds herself with immediate problems in the forms of her fellow soldier Dylan 'Smurf' Smith (Iwan Rheon), an ex-fling, and her commanding officer, Captain James (Ben Aldridge), who doubts her capabilities as a medic. She struggles to deal with the heat and treating injuries, but she gains her peers' respect after saving Smurf. On her tour of duty, Molly befriends a young local girl, Bashira (Becky Eggersglusz), despite Bashira's insurgent father, Badrai (Aubrey Shelton), injuring Bashira for it. While Molly tends to Bashira's wound, Bashira warns her not to let 2-Section go to the mountains, their next checkpoint. Molly tells this to Captain James, who heeds the warning before the checkpoint is blown up the next day. For disclosing the information, Bashira is in danger, so is arranged to move to Kabul. However, she is later found with a vest of bombs strapped to her, with Molly being able to keep her calm while it is removed.

Released on rest, Molly sees her parents are at odds, as her mother wants to be a classroom assistant while her father disagrees. She visits Smurf in Newport, and they bond over their shared trauma. Before returning to Afghanistan, she advises her parents to listen to each other. When she is reunited with Captain James, she confesses her love for him. They learn that Badrai is travelling to Kabul to bomb Bashira's location. At the checkpoint, Molly kisses Captain James, with Smurf watching in horror as he harboured feelings for her. Despite Captain James and Smurf being injured, the mission is successful as Molly shoots Badrai, killing him. When 2-Section returns home, Molly is awarded the Military Cross and is pleased to see her parents on better terms. Captain James and Smurf are both nursed to health, but Smurf dies from an intracerebral hemorrhage. At his funeral, Molly decides to return to Afghanistan on a short tour, where she learns that Bashira is alright and begins training medics there. After her time in the series ended, Molly and Captain James marry and, though they later separate, they eventually reconcile.

== Reception ==
Turner's portrayal of the character was well-received by critics and audiences. BBC One controller Charlotte Moore commented that Turner "beautifully captured" Molly's character in the show's pilot. Dan Owen of MSN called "Molly's transformation from cheeky party-goer to a soldier with self-respect and discipline [...] entertaining and occasionally quite moving" and added that Turner's portrayal was a highlight of the film. Ellen E. Jones of The Independent and described Turner's performance as "immensely likeable" despite admitting that the premiere relied on her charisma "to the detriment of other characters". Jones opined that Molly's "constant whimpering" was unrealistic for an army medic and called the character a "liability". Dale Cowan of Cultbox praised Turner's performances, saying "she shone" in the pilot episode so much that it justified the continuation series. Cowan concluded: "Turner has approached the series with a warmth and human relatability in the role and is electric as the maturing, yet conflicted, Molly".

Following Turner's exit, Grounds addressed disappointed reactions from fans and viewers, noted that he identified with the reactions to her departure and agreed with them, as he had previously commented that he "loved" Molly's character. Cowan (Cultbox) described the announcement of Molly's replacement with Georgie as "bittersweet" as fans were "devastated" by Turner's departure. Ben Allen of Radio Times explained that after Molly's departure, fans had been "holding on to some hope that she would return". Molly and Captain James's off-screen marriage was met with mixed reactions, with Sarah Doran of Radio Times saying that fans were "gutted to realise they'd missed out on the big day". Jess Lee of Digital Spy reported that their eventual off-screen breakup had ignited "upset" reactions from fans on Twitter. Allen (Radio Times) reported fans being "fuming" about the breakup, with some labelling it a "betrayal" to the show's original audience. Thomas Ling, writing for Radio Times, listed the breakup as one of the reasons why Captain James and Georgie's eventual relationship was poorly received by fans, explaining that "many feel sorry for [Molly]". Rianne Houghton of Digital Spy commented that many viewers had expressed interest in seeing Molly and Georgie meet on-screen.
