= Murdered by My Boyfriend =

2014 British television programme directed by Paul Andrew Williams

- Genre: Crime drama
- Written by: Regina Moriarty
- Directed by: Paul Andrew Williams
- Starring: Georgina Campbell; Royce Pierreson; Kate Hardie; Simona Brown
- Composer: Navid Asghari
- Country of origin: United Kingdom
- Original language: English

Production
- Running time: 60 minutes
- Production company: BBC Productions

Original release
- Network: BBC Three
- Release: 23 June 2014

Murdered by My Boyfriend is a fact-based drama that first aired on BBC Three in 2014. It stars Georgina Campbell as Ashley Jones, a young victim of domestic abuse at the hands of her controlling boyfriend, Reece, portrayed by Royce Pierreson.

It was based on an actual case of murder, with the victim's family asking the producers to give the characters different names. According to the producers, the purpose of the film is to educate juvenile viewers about relationship abuse.

== Plot ==
This film is based on the true story of Casey Brittle, who was beaten to death by her boyfriend in Nottingham in 2010.

17-year-old Ashley meets Reece at a house party and they begin dating. She is initially swept off her feet by his good looks and charming personality but as time goes by, Reece's controlling and abusive nature becomes more and more apparent; he tells her what she can and cannot wear, checks her texts and Facebook page, and insults her appearance.

Within three months, Ashley unintentionally becomes pregnant and Reece persuades her to keep the baby. After striking Ashley while heavily pregnant, she considers leaving him, but goes back after he promises never to hurt her again. Three years later, now living together with their young daughter Jasmine, Reece's violence has increased and is taking a toll on Ashley's entire life. When she confides in her best friend Kim and shows her numerous bruises, Kim begs her to leave him; Ashley tells her it is not that easy and sometimes the relationship is good.

One afternoon while Ashley is at work in a clothing store, Reece storms in, headbutts her and then drags her into a fitting room before beating her up. Her colleague calls the police and Ashley ends the relationship. Later while on a night out in Leicester, Ashley sleeps with another man, but he tells her he does not want to take it further as Reece will not let that happen.

Reece initially leaves Ashley alone but over time he returns and, after constant berating and no help from the police, she takes him back. Reece proposes and Ashley reluctantly accepts. One night after Reece arrives home drunk from a night out, he asks Ashley if she slept with anyone while they were broken up. When she tells him she did, he flies into a rage and beats her to death with an ironing board while Jasmine watches in tears.

Reece is initially sentenced to fifteen years in prison, but his sentence is later increased to twenty years on appeal due to the violent nature of the assault that resulted in Ashley's death.

== Characters ==
- Ashley Jones – Jess Commons of Grazia states that Ashley is not a "pitiful victim" through and through but becomes inundated with abuse as the film progresses. Due to an increase in domestic violence involving people aged 16–24, the producers made Ashley a teenager. The mother of the real-life murder victim stated that "My daughter was strong-willed and independent, but her murderer manipulated, controlled, and persuaded her into continuing the relationship."
- Reece – Sophie Goddard of Cosmopolitan UK remarked that the character has a "likeable, personable side" and an "abusive, controlling, violent" one, which shows the "complexity of this situation for victims." Campbell states that initially Reece is "charming and older and funny and sweet".

== Reception ==
In a piece for British broadsheet The Daily Telegraph, writer Regina Moriarty said: "I hope that people watching will note the way that Reece starts, little by little, to take control of Ashley's life, and if they can see that that's happening to them or someone they know, they'll do something about it – talk about it, get some more information... something".

Sarah Hughes of The Guardian wrote that the "veracity" of the story and the young ages of the characters "marks [it] apart" from similar works.

The programme won a Royal Television Society Award for Best Single Drama in 2014, and Campbell won a BAFTA Award for Best Actress in 2015, ahead of bookmakers' favourite Sheridan Smith.

This drama was released on DVD on 21 September 2015.
