= The Martins (film) =

2001 film by Tony Grounds

- Theatrical release poster
- Directed by: Tony Grounds
- Written by: Tony Grounds
- Produced by: Bruce Davey
- Starring: Lee Evans; Kathy Burke; Eric Byrne; Linda Bassett; Mark Strong; Paddy Considine
- Edited by: Robin Sales
- Music by: Richard Hartley
- Production company: Tiger Aspect Productions
- Distributed by: Icon Film Distribution
- Release date: 14 September 2001
- Running time: 87 minutes
- Country: United Kingdom
- Language: English
- Budget: £855,874

The Martins is a 2001 British comedy film written and directed by Tony Grounds and starring Lee Evans and Kathy Burke. The film was released in the United Kingdom on 14 September 2001.

== Synopsis ==
Out-of-work scrounger Robert Martin lives with his dysfunctional family (long-suffering wife Angie, accident-prone son Little Bob, and pregnant 14-year-old daughter Katie) in a shabby house in Hatfield, next door to the Galleria Shopping Centre above the A1, about 25 miles north of London.

Competition addict Robert dreams of winning a holiday for his family to a dream island. It turns out to be the Isle of Man, but he fails to win the competition. Feeling cheated out of a win, he flips and goes to the editor's office with a gun and steals his suit, then goes to an ice-cream shop with his family and steals a parrot from a pet shop for Little Bob's birthday.

Robert tracks down the elderly winners, threatens them with a gun, ties them up in the cellar, and steals their tickets. The police find them tied up. Upon arriving, Angie finds out Robert has cheated on her with their next-door neighbour. However, the family enjoys the holiday.

The police eventually catch up with Robert and he is convicted and sent to prison. When he is released, he discovers that his family life has improved.
