= List of awards and nominations received by Michelle Keegan =

Michelle Keegan awards and nominations
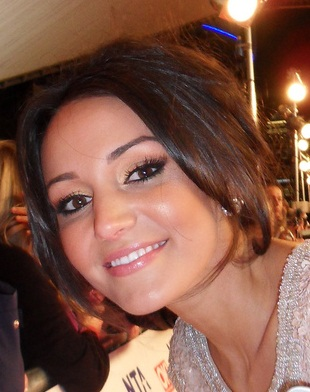
- Keegan at the 2012 National Television Awards
Awards and nominations
Award	Wins	Nominations
All About Soap Awards	3	0
British Soap Awards	7	8
Digital Spy Reader Awards	0	2
Inside Soap Awards	6	12
National Film Awards UK	0	1
National Television Awards	0	5
RTS North West Awards	0	1
TRIC Awards	0	2
TV Choice Awards (Note: The awards were formerly known as "TV Quick and TV Choice Awards" and were presented jointly by the TV Quick and TV Choice magazines. In 2009, they were renamed "TV Choice Awards" and have subsequently been presented only by TV Choice.)	4	9
TV Now Awards	1	3
TVTimes Awards	0	3

Totals (Note: Certain award groups do not simply award one winner. They acknowledge several different recipients, have runners-up, and have third place. Since this is a specific recognition and is different from losing an award, runner-up mentions are considered wins in this award tally. For simplification and to avoid errors, each award in this list has been presumed to have had a prior nomination.)
- Wins: 21
- Nominations: 46

Michelle Keegan is an English actress, who found popular success playing Tina McIntyre in the ITV soap opera Coronation Street (2008–2014). The role earned her widespread recognition and various accolades, including seven British Soap Awards, six Inside Soap Awards, four TV Choice Awards, three All About Soap awards, a TV Now Award, and three nominations for the National Television Awards. Among these were 12 accolades for "Sexiest Female", including six consecutive wins at the British Soap Awards between 2009 and 2014, which Keegan found "embarrassing. Because I was in a lot of heavy storylines. There was one where I felt like I was crying every day for months and months. And then at the end of it, when the accolade was sexiest female, it was so frustrating." The Guardian listed Tina as one of the 10 best Coronation Street characters of all time in 2010.

Following Keegan's departure from Coronation Street, she starred in the television dramas Ordinary Lies (2015) and Our Girl (2016–2020). Her performance in the former garnered her a nomination for the RTS North West Award for Best Female Performance in a Single Drama or Drama Series. For her portrayal of Georgie Lane in Our Girl, she received the Best Actress TV Choice Award in 2018 and nominations for a National Television Award and a TVTimes Award. She was also nominated for Best Comedy Performance at the TV Choice Awards for her role in the comedy series Brassic (2019–2025). Her performance in the thriller miniseries Fool Me Once (2024) earned her another National Television Award nomination and a nomination for a National Film Award UK. Apart from her recognitions for acting, Keegan was named by FHM as the Sexiest Woman on Television in 2013, the Sexiest Woman in the UK in 2014, and the Sexiest Woman in the World in 2015,

== Awards and nominations ==
List of award nominations, with the year of ceremony, category, nominated work, and result
Award	Year of ceremony	Category	Nominated work	Result	Ref(s)
All About Soap Awards	2010	Best Celeb Style	Coronation Street	Won	
All About Soap Awards	2011	Best Celeb Style	Coronation Street	Won	
All About Soap Awards	2012	Best Dressed Soap Star	Coronation Street	Won	
British Soap Awards	2008	Best Newcomer	Coronation Street	Won	
British Soap Awards	2009	Sexiest Female	Coronation Street	Won	
British Soap Awards	2010	Sexiest Female	Coronation Street	Won	
British Soap Awards	2011	Sexiest Female	Coronation Street	Won	
British Soap Awards	2012	Sexiest Female	Coronation Street	Won	
British Soap Awards	2013	Best Actress	Coronation Street	Nominated	
British Soap Awards	2013	Sexiest Female	Coronation Street	Won	
British Soap Awards	2014	Sexiest Female	Coronation Street	Won	
Digital Spy Reader Awards	2011	Best Soap Actress	Coronation Street	5th place	
Digital Spy Reader Awards	2012	Best Female Soap Actor	Coronation Street	2nd place	
Inside Soap Awards	2008	Best Couple (with Jack P. Shepherd)	Coronation Street	Nominated	
Inside Soap Awards	2008	Best Newcomer	Coronation Street	Nominated	
Inside Soap Awards	2008	Sexiest Female	Coronation Street	Nominated	
Inside Soap Awards	2009	Sexiest Female	Coronation Street	Won	
Inside Soap Awards	2009	Best-Dressed Soap Star	Coronation Street	Nominated	
Inside Soap Awards	2010	Sexiest Female	Coronation Street	Won	
Inside Soap Awards	2011	Sexiest Female	Coronation Street	Won	
Inside Soap Awards	2012	Best Actress	Coronation Street	Nominated	
Inside Soap Awards	2012	Sexiest Female	Coronation Street	Won	
Inside Soap Awards	2012	Best-Dressed Soap Star	Coronation Street	Won	
Inside Soap Awards	2013	Best Actress	Coronation Street	Nominated	
Inside Soap Awards	2013	Sexiest Female	Coronation Street	Won	
National Film Awards UK	2024	Best Actress in a TV Series	Fool Me Once	Nominated	
National Television Awards	2008	Most Popular Newcomer	Coronation Street	Nominated	
National Television Awards	2013	Serial Drama Performance	Coronation Street	Nominated	
National Television Awards	2014	Serial Drama Performance	Coronation Street	Nominated	
National Television Awards	2019	Drama Performance	Our Girl	Nominated	
National Television Awards	2024	Drama Performance	Fool Me Once	Nominated	
RTS North West Awards	2015	Best Female Performance in a Single Drama or Drama Series	Ordinary Lies	Nominated	
TRIC Awards	2013	Soap Personality	Coronation Street	Nominated	
TRIC Awards	2014	Soap Personality	Coronation Street	Nominated	
TV Choice Awards (Note: The awards were formerly known as "TV Quick and TV Choice Awards" and were presented jointly by the TV Quick and TV Choice magazines. In 2009, they were renamed "TV Choice Awards" and have subsequently been presented only by TV Choice.)	2008	Best Soap Newcomer	Coronation Street	Won	
TV Choice Awards	2011	Best Soap Actress	Coronation Street	Nominated	
TV Choice Awards	2012	Best Soap Actress	Coronation Street	Won	
TV Choice Awards	2013	Best Soap Actress	Coronation Street	Won	
TV Choice Awards	2014	Best Soap Actress	Coronation Street	Nominated	
TV Choice Awards	2017	Best Actress	Our Girl	Nominated	
TV Choice Awards	2018	Best Actress	Our Girl	Won	
TV Choice Awards	2020	Best Actress	Our Girl	Nominated	
TV Choice Awards	2025	Best Comedy Performance	Brassic	Nominated	
TV Now Awards	2008	Favourite Newcomer to Irish	Coronation Street	Nominated	
TV Now Awards	2009	Ireland's Sexiest TV Star	Coronation Street	Won	
TV Now Awards	2010	Favourite Female Soap Star	Coronation Street	Nominated	
TVTimes Awards	2013	Favourite Soap Star	Coronation Street	Nominated	
TVTimes Awards	2014	Favourite Soap Star	Coronation Street	Nominated	
TVTimes Awards	2020	Favourite Actress	Our Girl	Nominated	

== Other accolades ==
She was voted runner-up in the Best Dressed Soap Star category for the National Television Awards and British Soap Awards in 2014.

List of award nominations, with the year of ceremony, category, nominated work, and result
Award	Year of ceremony	Category	Nominated work	Result	Ref(s)
FHM	2011	Sexiest 100 Woman in the World	Herself	30th place	
FHM	2012	Sexiest 100 Woman in the World	Herself	26th place	
FHM	2013	Sexiest 100 Woman in the World	Herself	4th place	
FHM	2014	Sexiest 100 Woman in the World	Herself	2nd place	
FHM	2015	Sexiest 100 Woman in the World	Herself	Won	
Zoo Weekly	2010	101 Hottest Woman in the World	Herself	2nd place	
Zoo Weekly	2013	101 Hottest Woman in the World	Herself	Won	
Zoo Weekly	2015	101 Hottest Woman in the World	Herself	8th place	
The Sun	2021	Sexiest Woman in Showbiz	Herself	Won	
