= Tina and Bobby =

- Genre: Drama
- Based on: Tina and Bobby Moore
- Written by: Lauren Klee
- Directed by: John McKay
- Starring: Michelle Keegan; Lorne MacFadyen; Patsy Kensit; David Bamber; Sophie Austin
- Composer: Kevin Sargent
- Country of origin: United Kingdom
- Original language: English
- No. of series: 1
- No. of episodes: 3

Production
- Executive producer: Kieran Roberts
- Producer: Spencer Campbell
- Editor: Oral Ottey
- Running time: 47–48 minutes
- Production company: ITV Studios

Original release
- Network: ITV
- Release: 13 January – 27 January 2017

Tina and Bobby is a British television series based on the relationship between footballer Bobby Moore and Tina Moore. The three-part series was first broadcast on 13 January 2017 on ITV.

== Premise ==
The series follows the life of Tina Dean and her husband, West Ham United footballer, Bobby Moore.

== Cast ==
- Lorne MacFadyen as Bobby Moore:

A young footballer who believes that football is his life. His life changes when he meets local girl, Tina Dean, and they start a life together.

- Michelle Keegan as Tina Dean:

An ordinary local girl who falls for West Ham United footballer, Bobby Moore.

- Patsy Kensit as Betty Dean, Tina's mother.
- Sophie Austin as Judith Hurst, wife of Geoff Hurst.

== Production ==
Tina is played by Michelle Keegan with Moore played by Lorne MacFadyen. The series covers the Moores' involvement with the 1966 World Cup, the Bogotá Bracelet incident and the 1970 World Cup.

== Episodes ==
No.	Title	Directed by	Written by	Original release date	UK viewers (millions)
1	"Episode 1"	John McKay	Lauren Klee	13 January 2017	6.41
In 1957 teen-aged West Ham footballer Bobby Moore starts to date Tina Dean and they are married five years later. On return from honeymoon England manager Alf Ramsey appoints Bobby as the national team captain, which, to Tina's annoyance, restricts their social life but the birth of a baby girl gives them cause for optimism. The couple suffer a blow when Bobby is diagnosed with testicular cancer though it is caught in time and cured. However Bobby's wish to leave West Ham for a more lucrative club almost loses him the England captaincy.
2	"Episode 2"	John McKay	Lauren Klee	20 January 2017	5.43
A nervous Tina watches as Bobby and the England team win the 1966 World Cup, with Bobby including his wife in the celebration photo shoot and a move to a more luxurious house. Tina also comes into the limelight as the pair are brought in for celebrity endorsements of advertising products. The birth of a son, Dean, completes the couple's happiness but it is clouded by Tina's mother's terminal cancer. Four years later Bobby and the team travel to Mexico where he is arrested for stealing a necklace but released. Tina flies out to support him but on returning home, following a kidnap scare, Bobby is at the centre of another controversy, causing Tina to doubt his fidelity.
3	"Episode 3"	John McKay	Lauren Klee	27 January 2017	5.69
Financial problems arise as Bobby's investment in a golf/country club goes sour. Bobby's reign as England captain comes to an end following poor performances. His time at West Ham also concludes with a move to Fulham. Attempts to subsequently move into football management come unstuck with a position at Watford falling through despite an earlier promise from chairman Elton John. A move by Bobby to a position in Hong Kong is combined with the breakdown of the marriage. A reconciliation fails leaving Tina to start a new life in Florida where she is very happy. On a trip back to the UK Tina happens to meet an older and ill looking Bobby on a train, the last time they saw each other.
