= Harki Bhambra =

English actor

- Born: Harkirat Singh Bhambra; 7 March 1985 (age 41); Leeds, England
- Education: University of Manchester; Mountview Academy of Theatre Arts
- Years active: 2014–present

Harkirat Singh Bhambra (born 7 March 1985) is an English actor. On television, he is known for his roles in the BBC Two sitcom Two Doors Down (2016), the BBC One series Our Girl (2017–2018), the ITV drama The Good Karma Hospital (2022) and the RTÉ comedy-drama Sisters (2023).

== Early life ==
Born in Leeds, Bhambra grew up in the Upper Wortley and Whinmoor areas of the city. He graduated with a Bachelor of Science (BSc) in Management from the University of Manchester and worked as a commercial manager and quantity surveyor in the construction industry for five years. He went on to train at the Mountview Academy of Theatre Arts in London.

== Career ==
After taking part in university and fringe productions, Bhambra made his television debut in 2015 with guest appearances in the Doctor Who series 9 episode "The Magician's Apprentice", as well as episodes of Londongrad and Drifters. He would later return to the Doctor Who universe for The Ninth Doctor Adventures audio drama from Big Finish Productions. In 2016, Bhambra had his first main role as Jaz in first two series of the BBC Two sitcom Two Doors Down. Bhambra then joined the main cast of the BBC One military drama Our Girl for its third series as Rab. He had a small role in the 2018 anthology London Unplugged and appeared in The Village at the Theatre Royal Stratford East.

In 2020 and 2021, Bhambra played Ajay Dewan in the ITV soap opera Coronation Street. In 2022, Bhambra starred in the fourth series of the medical drama The Good Karma Hospital, also on ITV, and appeared in an episode of the BBC miniseries This Is Going to Hurt. This was followed by his feature film debut in the 2023 biographical sports film Gran Turismo as Persol and a role as Steve in the RTÉ comedy Sisters.

== Personal life ==
Bhambra plays football as a hobby and supports Arsenal, as influenced by Ian Wright.

== Filmography ==
=== Film ===
| Year | Title | Role | Notes |
|---|---|---|---|
| 2018 | London Unplugged | Dan'ish | Anthology |
| 2023 | Gran Turismo | Persol | |
| 2024 | Way Home | Bilal | |
| 2025 | Code/Switch | Inner City Ashmir | Short film |

=== Television ===
| Year | Title | Role | Notes |
|---|---|---|---|
| 2015 | Doctor Who | Mike | Episode: "The Magician's Apprentice" |
| 2015 | Londongrad | Jimmy Winter | 1 episode |
| 2015 | Drifters | Best Man | Episode: "Wedding" |
| 2016 | Two Doors Down | Jaz | Main role, series 1–2 (10 episodes) |
| 2017–2018 | Our Girl | Rab | Main role, series 3 (12 episodes) |
| 2020 | Vera | Vinay Deol | Episode: "Parent Not Expected" |
| 2020 | Shakespeare & Hathaway: Private Investigators | Amit Azim | Episode: "Teach Me, Dear Creature" |
| 2020 | Endeavour | Bobby Singh | Episode: "Raga" |
| 2020–2021 | Coronation Street | Ajay Dewan | 5 episodes |
| 2021 | Call the Midwife | Raj Gupta | 1 episode |
| 2021 | Flack | Stu | Episode: "Sofi" |
| 2022 | This Is Going to Hurt | Huck | 1 episode |
| 2022 | The Good Karma Hospital | Dr Samir Hasan | Main role, series 4 (6 episodes) |
| 2023–2025 | Sisters | Steve | 5 episodes |
| 2025 | Frauds | Prak | 1 episodes |
| 2025 | Play for Today | Chris Trench | Episode: "Special Measures" |

== Stage ==
| Year | Title | Role | Notes |
|---|---|---|---|
| 2014 | Mind the Gap | Faisul | Unity Theatre, Liverpool |
| 2015 | Object Love | Isaac | The Vaults, London |
| 2018 | The Village | Gopi | Theatre Royal Stratford East |
