= Michelle Keegan =

English actress (born 1987)

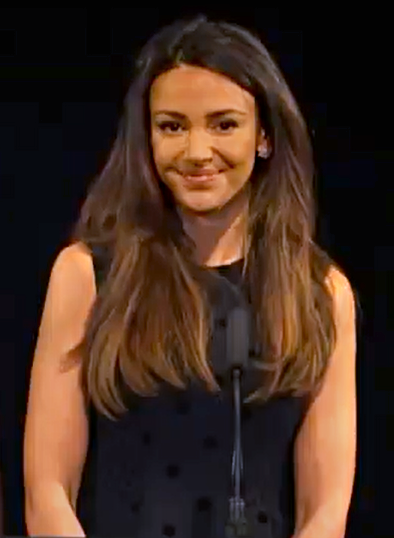
- Keegan in 2018
- Born: Michelle Elizabeth Keegan; 3 June 1987 (age 39); Stockport, Greater Manchester, England
- Occupation: Actress
- Years active: 2007–present
- Known for: Coronation Street (2008–2014); Our Girl (2016–2020); Tina and Bobby (2017); Brassic (2019–2025); Ten Pound Poms (2023–2025); Fool Me Once (2024)
- Spouse: Mark Wright (m. 2015)
- Children: 1
- Relatives: Carol Wright (mother-in-law); Jess Wright (sister-in-law); Josh Wright (brother-in-law)
- Awards: Full list

Michelle Elizabeth Keegan (born 3 June 1987) is an English actress. She is known for her roles as Tina McIntyre in the ITV soap opera Coronation Street (2008–2014) and Georgie Lane in the BBC military drama Our Girl (2016–2020). Keegan has also starred as Tina Moore in the biopic Tina and Bobby (2017), Erin Croft in Sky Max comedy-drama Brassic (2019–2025), Kate Thorne in BBC period drama Ten Pound Poms (2023–2025), Maya Burkett in Netflix thriller Fool Me Once (2024) and DI Emma Crane in the ITV crime drama The Blame (2026).

== Early life ==
Michelle Elizabeth Keegan was born on 3 June 1987 in Stockport, England, to Michael Keegan and Jackie Turner. Her maternal grandmother was a Gibraltarian who married a British soldier stationed in Gibraltar. She has Irish ancestry on her father's side.

She attended St Patrick's RC High School in Eccles near Manchester, Pendleton College in Salford and later the Manchester School of Acting. She worked at Selfridges in the Trafford Centre, and as a check-in agent at Manchester Airport.

== Career ==
In late 2007, in only her second audition, Keegan was offered the part of Tina McIntyre in Coronation Street, and accepted the role, beating around 900 other people who auditioned. She decided to leave the show after six years in 2013 and Tina was killed off, making her last appearance on 2 June 2014. Throughout her time on the show, Keegan's character Tina featured in many high-profile storylines. The Guardian listed her as one of the 10 best Coronation Street characters of all time in 2010. In 2008, the actress flew out to South Africa to film the straight-to-DVD film Coronation Street: Out of Africa, a Coronation Street spinoff, in which she appeared as Tina.

In June 2009, Keegan made her radio debut co-hosting the BBC Radio 1 programme The Official Chart. She was featured on the cover of FHM magazine in January 2011 and placed at number 30 and number 26 in their 100 Sexiest Women poll for 2010 and 2011, respectively. She appeared on their cover again in March 2013 and was placed at number four in the 2013 poll, eventually winning in 2015.

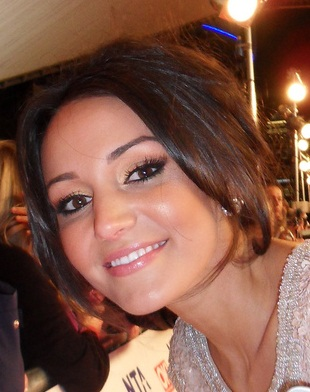
Keegan in 2012

Keegan made a guest appearance as herself in the 2009 Easter special Red Dwarf: Back to Earth. In June 2014, she embarked on a European tour to perform as Tinkerbell in Peter Pan.

In 2015, she was cast as Tracy Shawcross in the BBC television drama series Ordinary Lies. In June 2015, it was announced that she would play the starring role of Georgie Lane in series 2 of the BBC drama series Our Girl, replacing Lacey Turner as Molly Dawes, which aired throughout September 2016; a third series consisting of 12 episodes began airing in October 2017. She returned for her final series as Georgie in 2020. Also in 2016, Keegan landed a guest role on the ITV2 comedy series Plebs. In June 2016, she began filming the ITV drama series Tina and Bobby, based on Tina Dean's and Bobby Moore's relationship in which she played Tina; it was a three part series which aired in January 2017. In 2017, Michelle Keegan partnered with the clothing brand Lipsy with her own collection.

Keegan portrayed the main character, Erin Croft, in Sky One's comedy-drama series, Brassic, which started in 2019. On 22 February 2022, Keegan was a guest judge on the Snatch Game episode of the first series of RuPaul's Drag Race: UK vs. the World. In May 2022, the BBC and STAN commissioned a new series starring Keegan, Ten Pound Poms, a drama about the British citizens who migrated to Australia after the Second World War, with filming commencing in Australia shortly after.

Keegan starred as the main character, Maya Stern, in the 2024 eight-part television series Fool Me Once, adapted from the 2016 Harlan Coben novel of the same name by Danny Brocklehurst and made for Netflix by Quay Street Production.

== Personal life ==
Keegan was in a relationship with the Wanted's lead singer Max George from December 2010. The couple became engaged in June 2011, but ended their relationship the following year.

In September 2013, after a nine-month courtship, she announced her engagement to television personality Mark Wright. They married on 24 May 2015.

In December 2024, the couple announced they were expecting their first child together. Their daughter, Palma, was born on 6 March 2025. The couple live in Epping, Essex.

== Filmography ==
Television and film roles
Year	Title	Role	Notes
2008–2014	Coronation Street	Tina McIntyre	Regular role; 861 episodes
2008	Coronation Street: Out of Africa	Tina McIntyre	Direct-to-video film; cameo appearance
2009	Red Dwarf: Back to Earth	Herself	Part 3
2013	Lemon La Vida Loca	Herself	Episode: "Keith's Birthday"
2015	Ordinary Lies	Tracy Shawcross	Main role
2016; 2017	Drunk History	Queen Elizabeth I; Mary, Queen of Scots	Series 2, episode 1; Series 3, episode 2
2016–2020	Our Girl	Georgie Lane	Main role (series 2–4)
2016	Plebs	Ursula	Episode: "The Vestal"
2016	The Crystal Maze	Herself / Contestant	Celebrity Stand Up to Cancer special
2017	Tina and Bobby	Tina Moore	Lead role
2017	The Keith & Paddy Picture Show	Princess Leia	Episode: "Star Wars: Return of the Jedi"
2018	Who Do You Think You Are?	Herself	Series 15, episode 1
2018	Strangeways Here We Come	Demi	Film
2019–2025	Brassic	Erin Croft	Main role
2022	RuPaul's Drag Race: UK vs. the World	Herself / Guest Judge	Series 1, Episode 4
2023–2025	Ten Pound Poms	Kate Thorne	Main role
2024	Fool Me Once	Maya Burkett	Main role
2026	The Blame	DI Emma Crane	Main role
TBA	The Woods	Lucy Silverfield	Main role

== Stage ==
Year	Title	Role	Notes
2014–2015	Peter Pan	Tinkerbell	European tour
