= Luke Pasqualino =

British actor (born 1990)

- Born: Luca Giuseppe Pasqualino; 19 February 1990 (age 36); Peterborough, Cambridgeshire, England
- Occupation: Actor
- Years active: 2008–present

Luca Giuseppe Pasqualino (born 19 February 1990) is an English actor. He is best known for portraying Freddie McClair in the television series Skins (2009–2010), d'Artagnan in the television series The Musketeers (2014–2016) and Elvis Harte in Our Girl (2016–2020).

Pasqualino currently plays the role of Bas Baddingham in the Disney+ series, Rivals.

== Early life ==
Pasqualino was born in Peterborough, Cambridgeshire, to Italian parents from Sicily and Naples. His father is the owner of a chain of salons. He attended Walton Community School, in Walton, Peterborough. There he joined the drama club, attended weekly workshops in the area, and performed in local productions.

== Career ==
In 2008, Pasqualino was cast in his first role at 18 when he became one of the new series regulars in the third season of the E4 teenage drama television series Skins. He portrayed Freddie McClair, a laid-back weed-smoking college pupil. The following year, Pasqualino made his film debut as the protagonist in the low-budget film Stingers Rule! about a local football team going against property developers who plan to destroy their beloved football ground. Pasqualino also guest starred on Casualty and Miranda.

In February 2010, Pasqualino was cast in the Warner Bros. Pictures supernatural horror film The Apparition; the film was released in August 2012. In 2011, Pasqualino appeared in a recurring role as Paolo, a young servant, on the historical drama television series The Borgias.

In October 2011, Pasqualino won the starring role in the Syfy television pilot Battlestar Galactica: Blood & Chrome as the younger self of William "Husker" Adama; the show was first distributed as a ten-episode online series on Machinima.com starting in November 2012, and then aired in early 2013 as a televised film on Syfy. In July 2012, Pasqualino starred in the romantic comedy film Love Bite.

In 2013, he appeared in the Bong Joon-ho's ensemble thriller Snowpiercer, which takes place aboard a train as it travels around the globe, carrying the last members of humanity after a failed attempt at climate engineering to stop global warming. The same year, Pasqualino appeared in a French television series, Jo.

In 2014, Pasqualino was set to lead Nick Corporon's indie LGBTQ+ film Retake as a young male prostitute. The film received funding on Kickstarter before being greenlit. The film was set to begin shooting in 2015, however Pasqualino dropped out for unknown reasons, being replaced by Devon Graye.

From 2014 to 2016, he starred as d'Artagnan in the BBC production of The Musketeers, based on the Alexandre Dumas novel. Following the ending of that, Pasqualino began his run in the BBC1 army drama series Our Girl as Elvis Harte. He joined the main cast for the second series, however only appeared for four episodes in the third series due to filming conflicts with Snatch. Pasqualino returned as a guest for the fourth and final season in 2020.

From 2017 to 2018, Pasqualino starred in Crackle's television adaption of Guy Ritichie's 2000 film Snatch. He led the show as Albert Hill, alongside Rupert Grint, Lucien Laviscount, and Phoebe Dynevor. He also made an appearance in Jordan Stephens' 2017 music video for "Wildhood."

Pasqualino made his professional stage debut in 2019 with Berberbian Sound Studio, Joel Horwood's stage adaption of the 2012 horror film by Peter Strickland. He portrayed Director Santini, an abusive director using film to display his sadistic tendencies towards women. The show received generally positive reviews and ran from February to March that year.

In 2021, he played David Kostyk in the Netflix series Shadow and Bone. He also had a guest role in the tenth series of Death in Paradise, as Ed Lancer. The following year, he starred in the murder-mystery film Medusa Deluxe, alongside Clare Perkins, Anita-Joy Uwajeh, Kae Alexander, Harriet Webb, Darrell D'Silva, and Heider Ali.

In 2024, Pasqualino had a recurring role in the Disney+/Hulu adaptation of Jilly Cooper's Rivals. He portrayed Basil 'Bas' Baddingham, the younger and promiscuous half-brother of Tony (David Tennant) who owns the local bar in 1980s England. The show received widespread critical acclaim and was picked up for a second season in December. He also appears in a voice role for the animated film The Lord of the Rings: The War of the Rohirrim as Wulf, "a clever and ruthless Dunlending lord seeking vengeance for the death of his father." The film was released by Warner Bros. in December.

That November, Pasqualino was cast in Stelana Kliris' thriller drama Apart from Her. He will star alongside Leem Lubany and Girley Jazama.

== Filmography ==
=== Film ===
Year	Title	Role	Notes
2009	Stingers Rule!	Anthony	
2012	Love Bite	Kev	
2012	The Apparition	Greg	
2013	Snowpiercer	Grey	
2017	Smartass	Donny	
2019	The Gandhi Murder	DCP Jimmy	
2022	Medusa Deluxe	Angel	
2024	The Lord of the Rings: The War of the Rohirrim	Wulf	Voice role
2025	Red Sonja	Osin the Untouched	
TBA	Apart †	TBA	Post-production

=== Television ===
Year	Title	Role	Notes
2009	Casualty	Dans	2 episodes
2009–2010	Skins	Freddie McClair	17 episodes
2009, 2013	Miranda	Jason	2 episodes
2011–2012	The Borgias	Paolo	7 episodes
2012	Battlestar Galactica: Blood & Chrome	William "Husker" Adama	Television film
2013	Jo	Lieutenant Zavaglia	Episode: "Invalides"
2014	Inside No. 9	Lee	Episode: "Sardines"
2014–2016	The Musketeers	d'Artagnan	30 episodes
2015	Drunk History	Dick Turpin	Episode: "Tutankhamen / Dick Turpin / Byron's Pet Bear"
2016–2020	Our Girl	Elvis Harte	13 episodes
2017–2018	Snatch	Albert Hill	20 episodes
2021	Death in Paradise	Ed Lancer	Episode: "Steamy Confessions"
2021–2023	Shadow and Bone	David Kostyk	8 episodes
2022	Shantaram	Maurizio	12 episodes
2024	Rematch	Xavier Valens	
2024–	Rivals	Basil 'Bas' Baddingham	14 episodes
2026	Criminal Record	Jean-Paul "JP" Brownlee	
2026	The Day	Luke	Post-production

=== Music videos ===
Year	Song	Artist	Notes
2017	Wildhood	Jordan Stephens	

== Stage ==
Year	Play	Role	Director	Venue	Ref.
2019	Berberian Sound Studio	The Director	Tom Scutt	Donmar Warehouse, London	

== Awards and nominations ==
Year	Award	Category	Nominated work	Result	Ref.
2010	Monte-Carlo Television Festival	Outstanding Actor - Drama Series	Skins	Nominated	
2015	Sky Arts Awards	Times Breakthrough	—N/a	Won	
