= Royce Pierreson =

British actor

- Born: Royce Pierreson Banemeck; 1 April 1989 (age 37); Saltash, Cornwall, England
- Education: Royal Welsh College of Music & Drama
- Occupations: Actor, narrator
- Years active: 2011–present
- Spouse: Natalie Herron (m. 2022)

Royce Pierreson Banemeck (born 1 April 1989), better known by his stage name Royce Pierreson, is a British actor and narrator. Royce is best known for his roles as DC Jamie Desford in the fourth series of Line of Duty and as Reece in Murdered by My Boyfriend.

He has since appeared as Dr Jamie Cole in Our Girl (2016), Jason Hales in Wanderlust (2018), Burt Rhodes in Judy (2019), Istredd in The Witcher (2019–present), and Doctor John Watson in The Irregulars (2021).

== Early life ==
Pierreson was born and grew up in Saltash, Cornwall. He studied drama for three years at City College Plymouth, In 2011, he graduated from the Royal Welsh College of Music & Drama.

== Career ==
In 2014, Pierreson appeared in the television film Murdered by My Boyfriend. In 2016, he appeared as Jamie Cole in the television show Our Girl.

In 2017, Pierreson appeared as AC-12 officer Jamie Desford in the fourth season of Line of Duty.

In December 2022, Pierreson appeared as fitness instructor Miguel in I Am... Ruth alongside Kate Winslet.

In addition to work in film and on the television, Pierreson has had roles in many theatre productions. He was in a 2012 production of Scarberia at the Theatre Royal in York, a 2013 production of Blair's Children at the Cockpit Theatre in Marylebone, and a 2015 production of Patrick Marber's Three Days in the Country at the Lyttelton Theatre in London.

Royce also does some narration and has worked with the charity Causeway on an animation to help spread awareness of the link between unresolved childhood trauma and future violent behaviour.

== Personal life ==
Pierreson married Natalie Herron on 5 July 2022 at Polhawn Fort, having met in 2017 at a festival in Budapest. They are based between London and Stockholm.

== Filmography ==
=== Film ===
Year	Title	Role	Notes
2013	Love Me Till Monday	HIM	
2013	Thor: The Dark World	Student	
2013	Be Gentle	Sal	Short
2015	A Spell on You	Unknown	
2015	Survivor	Range Finder	
2016	Spectral	Sgt Lilo Diaz	
2017	Body Slam	Brian	Short
2018	Corpucia	Reece	Short
2019	Judy	Burt	

=== Television ===
Year	Title	Role	Notes
2011	London's Burning	Alex	TV movie
2012	Stella	Lee	Episode: "Episode #1.8"
2012	Holby City	Spike Leonard	Episode: "Half a Person"
2012	Lewis	Oliver Bowcock	Episode: "Generation of Vipers"
2013	Midsomer Murders	Finn Robson	Episode: "The Sicilian Defence"
2013	Dates	Richard	Episode: "Erica & Kate"
2013	Misfits	Rob	Episode: "Episode #5.3"
2014	Edge of Heaven	Craig	Episode: "Episode #1.3"
2014	Murdered by My Boyfriend	Reece	TV movie
2015	Death in Paradise	Daniel Thomson	Episode: "Stab in the Dark"
2015	Flack	Patrick	TV movie
2016	The Living and the Dead	Ben	Episode: "Episode #1.6"
2016	Our Girl	Dr Jamie Cole	Recurring role (season 2); 4 episodes
2017	Line of Duty	DC Jamie Desford	4 episodes; series 4
2018	Wanderlust	Jason Hales	Recurring role (season 1); 6 episodes
2019–present	The Witcher	Istredd	Recurring; (season 1), Regular; (season 2)
2020–present	24 Hours in Police Custody	Narrator	Documentary series
2021	The Irregulars	John Watson	Main role
2022	I Am... Ruth	Miguel	
2025	The Sandman (TV series)	King Auberon	Episode: "More Devils Than Vast Hell Can Hold"

=== Video games ===
Year	Title	Role	Notes
2016	Hitman	Supporting - A Gilded Cage/Militia Soldiers/Militia Technician/Freedom Fighters	Voice Role
2017	Mass Effect: Andromeda	Additional	Voice Role
2017	Need for Speed Payback	Voice Talent	Voice Role
2018	Hitman 2	Supporting - A Gilded Cage/Militia Soldiers/Militia Technician/Freedom Fighters/SpecOps 02	Voice Role

=== Theatre ===
- 2012: Scarberia, Theatre Royal
- 2013: Blair's Children, Cockpit Theatre
- 2015: Three Days in the Country, Lyttelton Theatre
- 2017: Julius Caesar, Crucible Theatre
- 2024: Richard II, as Henry Bolingbroke, Bridge Theatre
