= Ben Aldridge =

English actor (born 1985)

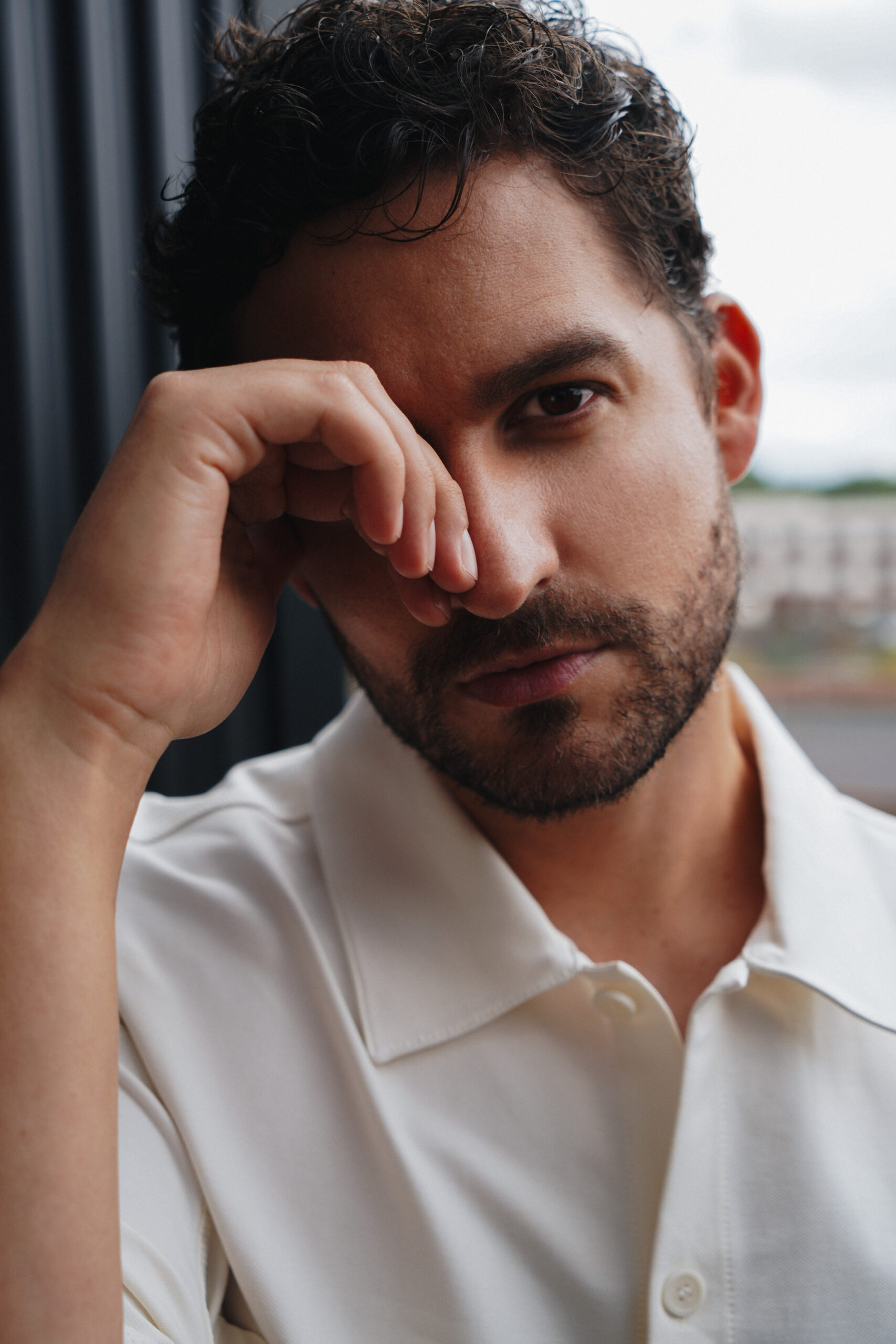
- Aldridge in 2021
- Born: Benjamin Charles Aldridge; 12 November 1985 (age 40); Exeter, Devon, England
- Education: London Academy of Music and Dramatic Art
- Occupation: Actor
- Years active: 2004–present

Benjamin Charles Aldridge (born 12 November 1985) is an English actor. He is known for his portrayals of Captain James in the BBC military drama Our Girl (2014–2018), Arsehole Guy in the dramedy series Fleabag (2016–2019), and Thomas Wayne in the crime drama series Pennyworth (2019–2023). He has starred in feature films such as Spoiler Alert (2022) and Knock at the Cabin (2023), among other work.

== Early years and education ==
Aldridge was born in Exeter, Devon, on 12 November 1985. He worked with the National Youth Theatre and graduated from the London Academy of Music and Dramatic Art with a bursary from the Genesis Foundation for young actors.

== Career ==
Aldridge's first professional acting role was in a play titled The Master and Margarita at Lyric Theatre, Hammersmith in 2004. In 2008, he made his television debut in the Channel 4's four-part miniseries The Devil's Whore, playing Harry Fanshawe, the husband of the title character. That same year, Aldridge was featured on Screen International's "Stars of Tomorrow" list. In addition to First Light, Lewis, Toast and Vera, Aldridge also appeared as Daniel Parish in the BBC One period drama Lark Rise to Candleford. In 2011, the American network The CW cast him as the lead character in the pilot Heavenly. Later on he spent time in Belgrade shooting the partially improvised romance short film In the Night for director Ivana Bobic and cinematographer Rain Li, starring along with supermodel Danijela Dimitrovska.

Aldridge is a co-founder of In the Corner Productions. He additionally directed the comedy pilot Pet Shop Girls in late 2011, which he co-wrote and co-produced with actor and screenwriters Luke Norris, Ed Hancock and Kirsty Woodward.

In 2013, Aldridge starred in Almeida Theatre's production of American Psycho as Paul Owen, where he was cast along with Matt Smith, Susannah Fielding, Jonathan Bailey, and Lucie Jones. Aldridge joined the BBC's original drama series Our Girl in September 2024, playing the role of Captain James. He left the series after the third season in 2018. In December 2014, Aldridge joined The CW's series Reign as King Antoine of Navarre.

More recently Aldridge has starred in Fleabag (2016–2019), Pennyworth (2019–2023), Spoiler Alert (2022) and the post-apocalyptic horror movie Knock at the Cabin (2023).

== Personal life ==
Aldridge was raised as an evangelical Christian. Both his parents and grandparents were raised in the Plymouth Brethren church, although his parents both left the denomination at the age of 18. Commenting on his relationship with religion as an adult, Aldridge stated in a 2021 interview that there were no religious aspects in his life.

In 2020, Aldridge publicly came out as a member of the LGBTQ+ community in a post on Instagram on the occasion of National Coming Out Day. In a 2021 interview with Attitude magazine, he said that he was gay and stated in another interview for Attitude in 2023 that his recent leading gay roles had helped him explore his own identity, adding that he felt more comfortable playing them than when he was younger. The magazine distinguished him as a "trailblazer" for the LGBTQ+ community in its 2023 article.

== Acting credits ==
=== Film ===
Year	Title	Role	Notes	Ref.
2013	In the Night	Alex	Short film	
2013	The Railway Man	Mike Moffat		
2014	Synchronicity	Fred	Short film	
2018	The Titan	Lawrence		
2018	Paris Song	George Gershwin	Main role	
2019	Thrive	Alex	Short film	
2022	Spoiler Alert	Kit Cowan		
2023	Knock at the Cabin	Andrew		
2024	Dear Paris	Mike Webster	French production	

=== Television ===
Year	Title	Role	Notes	Ref.
2008	The Devil's Whore	Harry Fanshawe	Miniseries; episode 1	
2008	Compulsion	Alex	Television film	
2009	Lewis	Daniel Rattenbury	Episode: "The Point of Vanishing"	
2010	First Light	Brian Kingcome	Television film	
2010	Toast	Stuart	Television film	
2010–2011	Lark Rise to Candleford	Daniel Parish	Starring role; 16 episodes	
2011	Heavenly	Dashiel Coffee	Television film	
2012	The Cricklewood Greats	Joe Hazelhurst	Television film	
2012	Vera	Ollie/Alex Barton	Episode: "Sandancers"	
2013	Pramface	Marcus	Episode: "If You Cry, I'll Cry"	
2013	The Bible	Luke	Miniseries; episode: "Courage"	
2014–2018	Our Girl	Captain James	Main role	
2014–2015	Reign	Antoine of Navarre	7 episodes	
2015	DeTour	Michael Sturges	Unaired Television Pilot	
2016	Stan Lee's Lucky Man	DS Ben Grady	2 episodes	
2016, 2019	Fleabag	Arsehole Guy	Recurring role; 6 episodes	
2019–2022	Pennyworth	Thomas Wayne	Main role	
2021	The Long Call	DI Matthew Venn	Main role	
2024	Kite Man: Hell Yeah!	Jeremy Karne	Voice; Episode: "Prison Break, Hell Yeah!"	

=== Theatre ===
Year	Title	Role	Theatre / Producer	Ref.
2004	The Master and Margarita	Pinstripe / Doctor	Lyric Hammersmith	
2005	Antigone at Hell's Mouth	Rothenkopf	Kneehigh Theatre	
2006	Fish and Company	Tom	Soho Theatre	
2006	Shelf Life	Dan	Old Red Lion	
2009	Romeo and Juliet	Benvolio	Shakespeare's Globe	
2013	The Lyons	Brian Hutchins	Menier Chocolate Factory	
2013	American Psycho	Paul Owen	Almeida Theatre	
2017	Run The Beast Down	Titus Halder	The Marlowe Theatre	

=== Video games ===
Year	Title	Role	Notes	Ref.
2012	The Secret World	Saïd (voice)		
2022	Lego Star Wars: The Skywalker Saga	(voice)		

== Awards and nominations ==
Award	Date of ceremony	Category	Work	Result	Ref.
The Queerties	28 February 2023	Performance – Film	Spoiler Alert	Nominated	
