= Tony Grounds =

British playwright and screenwriter

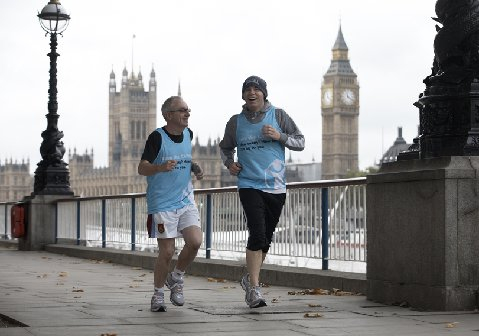
Tony Grounds (left) and Lee Evans in 2009.

Tony Grounds (born in East London) is a British playwright and screenwriter, who has worked extensively in television. Grounds was described by The Independent (11 October 2002) as "the best TV writer of his generation".

== Career ==
He started writing for the theatre, winning the Verity Bargate Award for Made in Spain, which was subsequently performed in London and published by Methuen. It was then filmed for ITV and transmitted in their Screenplay slot. There then followed stints on EastEnders and The Bill before he penned episodes of 'Chancer', which starred Clive Owen.

Grounds created and wrote Gone to the Dogs starring Jim Broadbent, Alison Steadman, Warren Clarke and Harry Enfield. It was nominated for a Writers Guild Award. He wrote Gone to Seed, in which Peter Cook made his final dramatic appearance. The series was nominated for a Royal Television Society Award.

The single film Our Boy with Ray Winstone and Pauline Quirke won Tony International Acclaim winning the Munich International Drama Award.

Grounds wrote the series The Ghostbusters of East Finchley for BBC2 and First Sign of Madness for ITV. The latter won the WorldFest Charleston Gold Award. He wrote Sex and Chocolate for Dawn French before writing the award-winning and BAFTA nominated Births Marriages & Deaths, once again starring Ray Winstone.

Mel Gibson's Icon Films then commissioned him to write and direct The Martins starring Lee Evans and Kathy Burke, which was nominated for a Golden Hitchcock at the Dinard Film Festival.

Grounds teamed up with director Joe Wright, writing Bodily Harm for Channel Four, where Tim Spall, George Cole, Leslie Manville and Annette Crosby garnered acting nominations. It was described by The Daily Telegraph as "an outstanding work of art depicting a nightmarishly apocalyptic vision of suburbia..."

Grounds wrote BBC1's Family Business. He worked again with Ray Winstone for Channel Four's exposé on corruption in the Premier League with All in the Game, which also featured The Wire's Idris Elba. Grounds wrote one of BBC1's Canterbury Tales. His 2004 TV film When I'm 64 for BBC2 starring Alun Armstrong and Paul Freeman won the Prix Europa Award for the best drama on any channel across Europe.

Grounds wrote single films for BBC1, A Class Apart and The Dinner Party which became the two most watched single films of the year. Grounds wrote one-off episode for BBC Drama, Our Girl that was broadcast 24 March 2013 on BBC One. Following the success of it, BBC commissioned 5 further episodes that were broadcast in 2014. The series began airing on 21 September 2014. Apart from writing the series, Grounds was also executive producer of the series together with Caroline Skinner. The series got to the semi-finals of the Radio Times TV Champion in 2014 where it was against Sherlock. The series returned in September 2016 for a series two starring Michelle Keegan and has aired a further 3 series since then.

== Personal life ==
Grounds is special advisor for Save the Children and ran the London Marathon with Lee Evans in 2010. He is also a supporter of West Ham United F.C. and often refers to the East London club in his plays and works.
