= Pilot (Our Girl) =

Pilot episode of Our Girl

- Our Girl episode
- DVD cover
- Directed by: David Drury
- Written by: Tony Grounds
- Editing by: Ben Drury
- Original air date: 24 March 2013
- Running time: 88 minutes

Episode chronology
← Previous —	Next → "Time"

"Pilot" (also referred to as "Our Girl") (Note: The film was aired under the title "Our Girl", but since the television series began airing, it became known as "Pilot". This article refers to it as "Pilot" for consistency, and to distinguish it from the TV series.) is a 2013 military drama film which serves as the television pilot of the BBC series Our Girl, initially created as a standalone project. It was directed by David Drury, produced by Ken Horn, and written by Tony Grounds, who eventually went on to create the series. The film focuses on a loud young woman with little future named Molly Dawes (Lacey Turner) and her decision to leave her troubled life behind to join the army.

Grounds based the film's plot on the idea that no conscript is "merely a soldier", and pitched it after hearing of a story about a woman becoming a well-respected army medic despite her rough start. Primarily filmed at the Army Training Centre Pirbright, and being commissioned on the condition that it would include Turner, Grounds developed the story and summarised it as following a "female combatant but she is also a daughter and a sister". The film aired on BBC One on 24 March 2013. Despite being met with mixed critical response, with many criticising the film's story but praising Turner's performance, it earned high viewership and was well-received by audiences, resulting in the series being conceived.

== Plot ==
18-year-old Molly Dawes (Lacey Turner), who lives in the East End of London, discovers that her boyfriend has been cheating, and after vomiting in an alleyway, she feels that her life has no purpose and decides to join the army as a combat medic. Encouraged only by the manager of the recruitment office, Sergeant Lamont (Paul Fox), she initially keeps her decision a secret from her family, which consists of her controlling father Dave (Sean Gallagher) and doting mother Belinda (Kerry Godliman). When the truth is exposed, Dave demands she changes her mind, threatening to disown her if she does not, leaving her to make the heartbreaking decision to step away as she heads off to training camp. Here, Corporal Geddings (Matthew McNulty) initially doubts Molly's merits as a potential soldier, but she strives to prove herself and eventually earns the respect of her peers, even reuniting with her mother Belinda when she visits her to apologise for Dave's actions.

== Production ==
Writer and creator Tony Grounds credited the idea that "no conscript is merely a soldier - they are someone's child or sibling, parent or spouse" with the commissioning of the film. He based the film's plot on a story he was told while visiting an army base with a friend, which entailed a young woman who was as "angry as a feral cat" during her basic training and had little chance of passing out who went on to become "one of the finest combat medics to have served in Afghanistan". As the idea stuck in the back of Grounds' mind, and having always wanted to write "a story of hope" about "the young and disenfranchised finding the 'thing' they are brilliant at", he pitched the idea after John Yorke, an executive on the BBC's drama department, asked Grounds if he had any ideas for projects that could involve actress Lacey Turner, resulting in the film's conception. Ken Horn and David Drury were brought in to produce and direct the film, respectively. Grounds developed the story and summarised it as being about a "female combatant but she is also a daughter and a sister". He added: "Every soldier is a citizen first and we explore their choices that lead them to an Army training camp and how the ensuing months will change their lives forever".

In October 2012, the film was announced, as well as Turner's casting as its protagonist, Molly Dawes. On her casting, Turner expressed her excitement to be a part of the project: "I am so excited to be a part of Our Girl. It is a beautifully written drama of one girl's journey through life. Molly is such an interesting character who shows such strength and determination. She's a girl who you cannot help but love". Yorke was "delighted" that Turner was part of the project, and billed Molly as being just as "colourful, unique and powerful" as Turner's EastEnders character Stacey Slater. Grounds was vocal about how necessary attention to detail for the plot was and explained the bones of the story as being "one girl's journey from a somewhat out of control miscreant, working in an East Ham nail bar, to someone who is an asset to her country". He sang praises towards Turner for her understanding of the plot and her character, commenting that she "was able to breath an astonishing life into the complex character of Molly Dawes". The film's plot was later teased to follow Molly's journey through her training and into active service in Afghanistan.

Grounds commented that scenes of basic training were filmed at the Army Training Centre Pirbright, with permission to film being granted through "skilled and careful negotiations with the Ministry of Defence". He added that soldiers from the camp were "accommodating" as they helped with details including how uniforms were worn, how to salute, and how to march. The actors were placed alongside real recruits undergoing training, meaning the film's stars had to "rise to the challenge". Scenes that took place inside aircraft were reportedly filmed at the Royal Air Force Museum Midlands. Horn later revealed that sequences of the film that were set in Afghanistan were filmed in a quarry in Leighton Buzzard, adding that it rained on both days of shooting. The film was completed three years after the initial meeting was held. The episode first broadcast on BBC One on 24 March 2013 at 9:00pm. After the pilot episode aired, it was announced that a five-episode television series which would continue the story had been commissioned.

== Cast ==
- Lacey Turner as Molly Dawes
- Mimi Keene as Jade Dawes
- Kerry Godliman as Belinda Dawes
- Sean Gallagher as Dave Dawes
- McKell David as Dean
- Dan Black as Artan
- Frieda Thiel as Proud Mary
- Vanessa Babirye as Sharon
- Cecilia Noble as Elizabeth
- Grant Davis as Perry
- Ged Forrest as Derek
- Andrew Scarborough as Sergeant Peters
- Steven Miller as Corporal Leech
- Stuart Ward as Corporal Brammer
- Katherine Pearce as Katy
- Lucy Briers as Major O'Brien
- Dominic Jephcott as Major Hart
- Matthew McNulty as Corporal Geddings
- Fiona Skinner as Corporal Richards
- Modupe Adeyeye as Jayne King
- Laura Kirkman as Lauren
- Beth-Zienna Williams as Di
- Catherine Hayworth as Holly
- Sarah Dungworth as Donna
- Sheena Glean as Joanna
- Katy Phipps as Lisa
- Aveen Stewart as Charlie
- Harriet Madeley as Nat
- Joanna Sawyer as Becky
- Branwell Donaghey as Sergeant Adams
- Harry Ferrier as Chris Ingrams
- Ciaran Clancy as Alex
- Teresa Churcher as Mrs Frewin
- David Ryall as George
- Paul Fox as Sergeant Lamont

== Reception ==
The pilot received mixed reviews from critics, with many praising Turner's performance and Molly's characterisation, but criticising the film's story. Dan Owen of MSN awarded the film 3/5 stars, commenting that Turner was "superb" and "made this drama excel" in the film, and "Molly's transformation from cheeky party-goer to a soldier with self-respect and discipline, still managed to be entertaining and occasionally quite moving", but was critical of how the "drama never quite managed to surprise", the script "didn't exactly rewrite the drama rulebook", and the "shortcuts" being taken in the story. Sarah Crompton of The Telegraph criticised the show's depiction of the British Army, saying "the depiction of the army – which became too obviously her surrogate family – would be better suited to a glossy advertising campaign than a television drama, glamourising both its methods and its personnel" as well as Molly's character as being "boldly unappealing", but concluded that it was "a compelling 90 minutes", and awarding it 3/5 stars.

Tom Sutcliffe of The Independent criticised the film for being overly patriotic, explaining: "Tony Grounds's drama Our Girl was so unequivocally approving of the benefits of joining up that it seemed entirely possible that viewers at a loose end might consider giving Army life a go". He described the plot as being "familiar", as it consisted of "initial chippiness and doubt hardening into resolve and acquired discipline". Sam Wollaston of The Guardian called it "clichéd and schmaltzy", and found it difficult to believe "that Molly from the start could be turned into Molly at the end in a few weeks", but found himself being "swept along" due to Turner's "gutsy, very watchable performance". Alex Fletcher of Digital Spy reported that audience reactions on Twitter were generally positive. Based on official overnight figures, it gained an audience of 5.34 million viewers. Consolidated viewing increased this figure to 6.31 million. The pilot was nominated for best Single Drama at the 2014 Royal Television Society Programme Awards.

== See also ==
- List of Our Girl episodes
