= Waterloo Road series 12 =

Waterloo Road
- Series 12
- DVD cover
- Starring: Angela Griffin; James Baxter; Ryan Clayton; Jo Coffey; Neil Fitzmaurice; Jamie Glover; Vincent Jerome; Rachel Leskovac; Kim Marsh; Katherine Pearce; Shauna Shim; Adam Thomas
- No. of episodes: 7

Release
- Original network: BBC One; BBC iPlayer
- Original release: 16 May – 27 June 2023

Series chronology
- ← Previous; Series 11 Next → Series 13

The twelfth series of the British television drama series Waterloo Road commenced airing on 16 May 2023, and concluded on 27 June 2023. The series comprised 7 episodes.

The show follows the lives of staff and Students of the eponymous secondary school in Greater Manchester while tackling a range of social issues. Topics covered in this series include the cost-of-living crisis, teen homelessness, racism, bulimia, being LGBTQ+, mental health, behavioral problems, young carers, gay fostering and adoption, elitism, knife crime, ADHD and the prioritisation of academic subjects over the arts in schools.

== Production ==
In February 2023, following the conclusion of the eleventh series, cast members Angela Griffin and Kym Marsh revealed that they were back filming on the set of the show. On 18 April 2023, the BBC confirmed that Waterloo Road would return in May 2023 and would contain seven episodes.

=== Story development ===
Stories from the show's previous series were continued into this series as part of the characters' ongoing development. The fallout from Danny Lewis (Adam Addou) bringing a knife into school and stabbing local gangster Vinny McCullen (Jason Milligan) in self-defense is a major focus, impacting several characters including music teacher Valerie Chambers (Shauna Shim), Danny's guardian who hid the weapon from the Police, his new girlfriend Samia Choudhury (Priyasasha Kumari), and Heateacher Kim Campbell (Angela Griffin), who must prevent the other Students from glorifying Danny's actions. Additionally, Kim's storyline features her struggling to maintain order at Waterloo Road in the wake of past events following a betrayal by her former lover and Deputy Head Linden King (Vincent Jerome) which almost caused her to lose her job. Kim's arc will see her reconnect with old flame Andrew Treneman (Jamie Glover), who last appeared in the show's fourth series. Discussing the relationship between the two characters, Glover stated that, "for Andrew, I think Kim is probably the most important person in his life. Because of their history, there's been a reticence to get back in touch with her, because it's maybe too painful for both of them to stir things up but in the end, the pull is inevitable." Jerome also talked about the impact of the previous series on Lindon, explaining "Lindon had his identity completely stripped from him. Everything he thought he knew about himself was proved wrong: him as a teacher, him as a colleague, him as a father and him as a husband. In the middle of all of that is Kim", and talked about how the character will be trying to make amends with her.

Student Preston Walters (Noah Valentine) features as part of several key storylines. Following their kiss last series, Preston continues to grapple with his sexuality as he considers going public about his relationship with Kai Sharif (Adam Ali) and continues his struggle with an eating disorder. The Walters family's financial struggles continues to be explored, as Nicky (Kym Marsh) resorts to desperate measures in order to keep herself and her children from becoming homeless and keeping food on the table. Kelly Jo Rafferty's (Alicia Forde) behavioral problems continue to receive focus this series, as the conflict between Nicky and her mum Debs (Hollie-Jay Bowes) gets in the way of her battle to receive an ADHD diagnosis. Following the death of his wife in the previous series, Donte Charles (Adam Thomas) continues his journey through grief and begins to consider the possibility of moving onto a new relationship, something which causes strains his relationship with daughter Izzy (Scarlett Thomas) and his colleague Amy Spratt (Katherine Pearce).

The series increases its focus on Deputy Head Joe Casey (James Baxter) by expanding his home life, with a greater spotlight on his relationship with Mike Rutherford (Ryan Clayton) and their foster sons Dwayne (Thapelo Ray) and Zayne Jackson (Inathi Rozani). Baxter expressed his excitement at this development, stating ""I think we were both really looking forward to having more to do and also exploring the family dynamic a little bit more. From my point of view, there was a bit of trepidation with wanting to get it right and not wanting to drop the ball." Similarly, Clayton explained that "it's interesting to explore the family dynamic, because there's a lot of dilemmas going on there with the characters. You'll see what Mike's position is about fostering Dwayne and Zayne and taking them on, how that works throughout the series and the challenges that come with that", and noted that he and Baxter did a lot of research around the adoption process in preparation for the storyline. Dwayne's character is also involved in a rivalry storyline with new Student Myles Massey (Osian Morgan). Discussing his character, Morgan explained "if I had to describe Myles in three words, I'd say calculated, misunderstood and alpha – but in capital letters. His ego is through the roof", and predicted that fans would "absolutely despise" him. The character of Shola Aku (Chiamaka Ulebor) also features in a prominent young carer storyline beginning in the fourth episode, when it is revealed that she has been looking after her mother, who suffers from fibromyalgia.

=== Casting ===
The twelfth series of Waterloo Road (and second since the series' revival in January 2023), features a cast of characters working at and attending the eponymous fictional high school set in Greater Manchester. All of the cast members from the previous eleventh series reprise their roles in this series. Angela Griffin stars as Kim Campbell, current Headteacher at Waterloo Road, alongside Vincent Jerome and James Baxter as Deputy Headteachers Linden King and Joe Casey respectively. Additional faculty members include Shauna Shim as music teacher Valerie Chambers, Neil Fitzmaurice as history teacher Neil Guthrie, Rachel Leskovac as Head of English Coral Walker, and Katherine Pearce as newly-qualified early careers teacher Amy Spratt. Other staff at the school include Jo Coffey as Wendy Whitwell, Kim's personal assistant, Adam Thomas as caretaker Donte Charles, Kym Marsh as canteen worker Nicky Walters and Sonia Ibrahim as school social worker Jamilah Omar. Ryan Clayton, who appeared in the first episode of the eleventh series as Joe's partner Mike Rutherford, returns this series when he is assigned as Waterloo Road's allocated police officer.

Among Students, Adam Abbou appears as Danny Lewis, who moved in with Val during the previous series, Adam Ali as his best friend Kai Sharif, and Priyasasha Kumari as his love interest Samia Choudhry. Noah Valentine stars as Preston Walters, with Summer Violet Bird featuring as his sister Tonya. Alicia Forde appears as their cousin Kelly Jo Rafferty, while Francesco Piacentini-Smith appears as her boyfriend and school troublemaker Dean Weever. Scarlett Thomas returns as Izzy Charles, Donte's daughter, while Ava Flannery appears as Linden's daughter Verity. Thapelo Ray and Inathi Rozani feature as Dwayne and Zayne Jackson, the foster children of Joe and Mike. Other returning students include Liam Scholes as Noel McManus, Lucy Eleanor Begg as Caz Williams, Chiamaka Ulebor as Shola Aku, Sahil Ismailkhil as Norullah Sayid, and Randi Agyare as Millie Adebayo.

On 18 April 2023, the BBC revealed that former cast member Jamie Glover would reprise his role as Andrew Treneman, Kim's former colleague and old flame who is now working as a representative of the Schools Against Knife Crime initiative and is sent to Waterloo Road following the events of the eleventh series' final episode. New characters introduced in the twelfth series include Osian Morgan as Myles Massey, a transfer student from a prestigious football academy, and Jenny Platt as his mum Rose Massey, who sits on the school's board of governors. Paul Bazely debuts as Ramesh Choudhury, Samia's father and the chair of governors at Waterloo Road, while Sia Kiwa features as Lisa Jackson, mother of Dwayne and Zayne who is a recovering alcoholic. Olwen May and James Quinn appear in the fifth episode as Ofsted Inspectors, Mrs Doubleday, and Mr Cribbins respectively. Hollie-Jay Bowes returns as Kelly Jo's mother and Nicky's sister Debs Raffety, having previously appeared in two episodes of series eleven.

=== Scheduling ===
The twelfth series debuted on 16 May 2023 at 8pm on BBC One and will air weekly. Following the broadcast of the first episode, the six remaining episodes were also made available to watch immediately on BBC iPlayer.

=== Podcast ===
On 18 April 2023, the BBC also confirmed that the Waterloo Road podcast series, hosted by Adam Thomas and Priyasasha Kumari would return for Series 12, with the BBC confirming that the podcast series would build up to the new series, and that it would continue to shine a light on the behind the scenes of Waterloo Road.

== Cast and characters ==
=== Main cast ===
- Angela Griffin as Kim Campbell; Headteacher
- James Baxter as Joe Casey; Deputy Head and languages teacher
- Ryan Clayton as Sergeant Mike Rutherford; School security officer
- Jo Coffey as Wendy Whitwell; PA to Headteacher
- Neil Fitzmaurice as Neil Guthrie; History teacher
- Vincent Jerome as Lindon King; Deputy Head and science teacher
- Rachel Leskovac as Coral Walker; Head of English
- Kym Marsh as Nicky Walters; School canteen worker
- Katherine Pearce as Amy Spratt; Early career english and drama teacher
- Shauna Shim as Valerie Chambers; Music teacher
- Adam Thomas as Donte Charles; School caretaker
- Jamie Glover as Andrew Treneman; Headteacher of St Mary's school and a former colleague of Kim's

=== Students ===
- Adam Abbou as Danny Lewis
- Noah Valentine as Preston Walters
- Alicia Forde as Kelly Jo Rafferty
- Adam Ali as Kai Sharif
- Priyasasha Kumari as Samia Choudhry
- Francesco Piacentini-Smith as Dean Weever
- Liam Scholes as Noel McManus
- Lucy Eleanor Begg as Caz Williams
- Summer Violet Bird as Tonya Walters
- Scarlett Thomas as Izzy Charles
- Ava Flannery as Verity King
- Thapelo Ray as Dwayne Jackson
- Inathi Rozani as Zayne Jackson
- Chiamaka Ulebor as Shola Aku
- Sahil Ismailkhil as Norullah Sayid
- Randi Agyare as Millie Adebayo
- Osian Morgan as Myles Massey

==== Recurring ====
- Sonia Ibrahim as Jamilah Omar; School social worker
- Paul Bazely as Ramesh Chowdhury
- Jenny Platt as Rose Massey
- Jason Milligan as Vinny McCullen
- Hollie-Jay Bowes as Debs Rafferty
- Jack Ashton as Lenny Sampson
- Sia Kiwa as Lisa Jackson

==== Guest ====
- Olwen May as Mrs Doubleday (episode 5)
- James Quinn as Mr Cribbins (episode 5)

== Episodes ==
No. in series	Title	Directed by	Written by	Original release date	UK viewers (millions)
208	Episode 1	Jesse Quiñones	Neil Jones	16 May 2023	N/A (<2.39) (Note: Not reported in the weekly top 50 programmes.)
The first day of the new term sees brothers Zayne and Dwayne Jackson being accompanied to school by their foster parents, Sergeant Mike Rutherford and deputy head Joe Casey in Mike’s police car. The repercussions of the previous term’s stabbing continue to reverberate; airport-style metal detectors have been installed at the school entrance much to the consternation of the pupils who believe excessive force was used in the arrest of Danny Lewis and that the police are in fact the enemy. In an attempt to get the pupils onside, Mike organises a charity football match with the pupils in mixed teams with the officers. Myles Massey, newly transferred to Waterloo Road from a football academy, decides to take part, but despite some shows of individual brilliance he eventually succumbs to a tackle by Dwayne Jackson, who he has been antagonising. What should have been a good-natured exercise in team building soon descends into chaos with a punch thrown and the police failing to find any common ground with the students. Dwayne decides to run away to Birmingham so that younger brother Zayne might have a chance at being adopted by Mike and Joe. Lacking funds for the ticket he stows away in the luggage compartment of a coach where heat exhaustion soon takes a toll and he passes out. Tonya having been in contact with him, reports this, which leads to his eventual rescue and reconciliation with Joe and Mike. Danny Lewis is out on bail. With the knife still not recovered, his prospects in court are uncertain. Samia pays him a visit at lunchtime and they end up consummating their relationship, only for Val to walk in on them much to the pair’s amusement. Later that same afternoon Danny receives a visit from Vinny with an offer that could see charges dropped, but after a meeting with Kim, he decides to go to the police and make a full confession. The LEA sends a representative from Schools Against Knife Crime which turns out to be Kim’s former colleague and love interest Andrew Treneman. Determined not to repeat the mistakes of the past, Kim lays down the rules and establishes some boundaries.
209	Episode 2	Amanda Mealing	Jayshree Patel	23 May 2023	N/A (<2.32)
Kelly Jo Rafferty is finally confirmed to have ADHD, but at the assessment meeting her mother Debs walks in late and smelling of alcohol. Nicky Walters, in attendance to support Kelly Jo, lets slip that her niece has been given valium by her mother without a prescription resulting in a fight between the sisters later in the canteen which is witnessed by the school governors. At the governors’ meeting, Samia’s father and Myles Massey’s mother express concerns regarding what they have seen and threaten to withdraw their support for Kim’s leadership unless she agrees to monthly progress meetings and no-notice walkabouts. Kim, finding herself backed into a corner, acquiesces both to the parent-governors and to meeting Andrew Treneman for a drink after work. Kim and Lindon’s professional relationship also continues to be fraught with tension, and matters are not helped when Verity, Lindon’s daughter overhears her father and the head teacher discussing details of their brief affair last term. Joe is given a letter from Zayne and Dwayne’s birth mother Lisa. Fearing the worst and the impact it may have on his and Mike’s attempt to adopt the boys, he fails to pass it onto the children. Encouraged by Neil, Amy pops round to Donte’s after school under the impression he may be interested in her, but is rebuffed after they kiss whilst under the influence of alcohol. When Nicky also calls round the same evening she spots a handbag on the hallway floor and her suspicions are aroused.
210	Episode 3	Jesse Quiñones	Davey Jones	30 May 2023	N/A (<2.48)
In the run up to the evening’s ‘Word Beaters’ poetry slam, Val and Kim clash over the precedence and funding being given to vocational subjects over the arts. Kim is reminded by Val of her past as a champion of the arts when she was at the coalface as a teacher, and is encouraged by Andrew Treneman to go back to teaching some classes herself in order to better connect with the students. Having recognised the handbag she had spotted in Donte’s hallway as Amy’s, Nicky approaches Donte and convinces him to make things right with Amy. Donte repairs the drama studio’s PA system and then takes Amy aside to have a chat, but both of them fail to realise that the mics are still live and that their every word is being broadcast to the children in the studio, including his daughter Izzy. Kai and Preston decide to make their blossoming relationship public, but when Kai arranges a job for Preston his attempt to help is not appreciated and Preston resorts to binge eating once again by stealing cereal bars from the school. Feeling the financial strain, Nicky too steals food from the canteen, but is spotted by Kai. After the ‘Word Beaters’ performance Kai announces the launch the Waterloo Road Food Bank. Preston, feeling humiliated walks out. When Kai eventually catches up with him, Preston confesses he has had an eating disorder since his parents separation.
211	Episode 4	Piotr Szkopiak	Kat Rose-Martin	6 June 2023	N/A (<2.38)
Shola Aku arrives late to school and during lessons she reveal to her classmates Izzy and Tonya, that she can no longer go on the forthcoming camping trip. Her out-of-character behaviour doesn’t go unnoticed by both her teachers and friends. During a meeting with social worker Jamilah Omar and Kim they notice a bruise on Shola’s forearm. With the prospect of social services becoming involved Shola makes good her escape from the school. When she arrives home she finds her mother who has fibromyalgia collapsed on the floor. Dean Weaver and Kelly Jo, out of the BU and back in the mainstream school on a trial basis find themselves in art class that Kim is taking. During the lesson Myles Massey provokes Kelly Jo in an attempt to get her sent back to the BU. When Dean prepares to defend his girlfriend he is stopped by Kim. Later Dean attempts to cook lunch for Kelly Jo on a makeshift barbecue which predictably results in a fire. Kelly Jo overwhelmed by voices in her head, takes refuge in the multi-faith prayer room, where Nurullah is praying. Joe receives an unexpected visitor in the shape of Dwayne and Zaynes’ estranged mother Lisa who wants to know if her children want to speak to her with a view to becoming a family once again. As she is leaving Lisa bumps into Zayne, who appears not to recognise her. Myles taunts the brothers about the existence of the letter and Lisa visiting Joe, prompting them to ransack Joe’s office to find the letter.
212	Episode 5	Piotr Szkopiak	Kellie Smith	13 June 2023	N/A (<2.25)
A surprise OFSTED monitoring visit has Kim and the staff on edge as a negative report would see Waterloo Road put into special measures. It emerges that history teacher Neil and Mr Cribbins the inspector know each other and no inspection of the lesson takes place. When Mr Cribbins indicates to Neil he will be giving Amy a “needs vast improvement” assessment whatever the quality of her teaching, Neil reminds him that he shouldn’t be inspecting lessons on the basis of his personal tastes and that the truth of their undeclared acquaintanceship should it come to light, would not look good. After a sleepover at his mother’s, Dwayne’s relationship with Joe is placed under further strain, and in a pique of anger indicates that he no longer wishes to be adopted. The devastating revelation has a massive emotional impact on Joe, but he comes to realise he must support the children in their wishes despite his reservations. Myles Massey in the meantime continues his campaign of trying to turn brother against brother. Nicky Walters under pressure to repay her two thousand pound loan from Vinny, decides to sell some of her possessions in an effort to meet the repayments but falls short and is given an ultimatum by the gangster. At a Knife Crime Initiative meeting at the school Danny and ex-offender Lenny Sampson are invited to share their experiences. They find common ground over lunch and Kim sensing the positive impact it has had invites Lenny back for further meetings.
213	Episode 6	Mustapha Kseibati & Piotr Szkopiak	Neil Jones	20 June 2023	N/A (<2.30)
As the end of term approaches, the school is holding a day of sponsored sports events in aid of Chlo’s Wishing Foundation, the charity set up by Donte in memory of his late wife. Preston is determined to break the school cross-country record but Myles also has his sights on the record. His mother messages him to say he has secured a trial with Leicester and not to do anything that might risk injury to his ankle, but Myles' competitive nature gets the better of him and when he spots race leader Preston collapsed on the course, he carries on without helping and it’s left to Dwayne, in third place, to do the right thing and raise the alarm, whilst Kai administers CPR. Loan shark Vinny pays a house call to Nicky and increases the pressure. She turns to sister Debs for help but is not only rebuffed but told to leave her house. Seeing no other way out, Nicky hatches a plan to steal the school’s new computers to pay off her debt whilst everyone is out of the building and preoccupied with the fundraiser. She is rumbled by Danny who has spotted Vinny on school grounds and worked out what is going on. Seeing the desperation on Nicky’s face, Danny takes the computers to Vinny in the car park, but is in turn spotted by Samia. To cap off a bad day, Kim learns the school’s insurance won’t cover the theft as the alarms and CCTV were switched off and there are no signs of forced entry, so any funds raised would barely recoup the losses. The finger of suspicion falls on Donte and he is told he’ll have to make a statement under caution by Sergeant Rutherford.
214	Episode 7	Mustapha Kseibati	Paul Mousley	27 June 2023	N/A (<2.37)
Whilst in hospital Preston receives a visit from a psychiatrist to help with his eating disorder, but he rejects the need for therapy and blames Kai for revealing his secret. His mother Nicky meanwhile is racked with guilt over the theft of the computers, but is told to put it behind her by Danny who is at the school to talk about his experience with knife crime at the debut of Radio Waterloo Road. Samia confronts Danny and reveals she saw him and Vinny in the car park acting suspiciously. After initially denying any involvement in the theft of the computers, he later confesses to her and reveals Nicky’s involvement in the theft. Myles receives news that his ankle is not sufficiently healed and should postpone his trial with Leicester. Angered by the thought that his football career may be over before its even begun and feeling victimised by the entire school, he takes over the radio station and broadcasts a polemic, denouncing his fellow pupils, teachers and everything the school stands for, even revealing Preston's eating disorder, much to Tonya's shock. Unable to control his anger he strikes down his mother Rose before setting fire to the drama studio in a psychotic episode. As the fire takes hold and explosions are heard, Myles makes it out but Danny is caught in a blast and brought out unconscious. The news of his subsequent death at the hospital leaves everyone devastated. So this episode focuses on, among other issues, the strained and erratic relationship of new pupil Myles Massey (Osian Morgan) who in an earlier episode broke his ankle in a tackle with Dwayne Jackson (Thapelo Ray) on the sports pitch. Myles' behaviour went from bad to worse after that. He was a talented footballer and couldn't cope with not being able to play for a team anymore, he had pushed himself into taking part in a cross country race while not being fit and being first to come across Preston (Noah valentine) on the run who was lying unconscious on the ground suffering a heart attack. Myles disregarded Preston's predicament and continued running regardless so that he could win the race, leaving Preston to be found by another party. Myles' behaviour continued to spiral downward culminating with the unintentional death of Danny Lewis (Adam Abbou) through a fire he started in one of the classrooms Myles was arrested and taken to the police station where he broke down. Nicky, having been offered a roof over her and the children’s head by Donte, confesses to him her part in the theft of the schools computers. Donte decides not to turn her in but keep her secret.
