= Paul Fox (actor) =

English actor

- Born: 10 April 1979 (age 47); Truro, Cornwall, England
- Occupation: Actor
- Years active: 1995–present

Paul Fox (born 10 April 1979) is an English actor, known for portraying Mark Redman in Coronation Street, Will Cairns in Emmerdale and Dr Jeff Goodwin in The Royal.

== Early life ==
Born in Truro, Cornwall, Fox moved to Greasby in Merseyside whilst still a baby. He has one older brother, Christian. He attended Hilbre High School in West Kirby, the Glenda Jackson Youth Theatre in Birkenhead, and West Cheshire College, where he took a BTEC national diploma in performing arts.

== Career ==
Fox made his television debut playing the nephew of Christopher Eccleston's character in the Channel 4 drama Hearts and Minds. He won the role after a casting director visited the Glenda Jackson Youth Theatre, looking for people to play a group of schoolchildren in the drama. Fox later won a role in the ITV children's drama Children's Ward, and went on to play Will Cairns in Emmerdale from 1997 to 1999.

Fox played Mark Redman, the long-lost son of Mike Baldwin, in Coronation Street from 1999 to 2000. Fox left the programme when Mark, who had started an affair with Mike's fiancé Linda Sykes, confessed to it on Mike and Linda's wedding day, and was thrown out by Mike. Fox reprised the role in 2001 and also in 2006, around the time of Mike's death from Alzheimer's.

Fox played Dr Jeff Goodwin in The Royal from 2003 to 2007 and also appeared in Casualty in 2008, playing Simon Tanner. His other television credits include Moving On, Doctors the Canadian science fiction drama Starhunter, and Westworld.

Fox's film credits include Elizabeth (1998), Deserter (also known as Simon: An English Legionnaire) (2002), and the short film Hero. He made his stage debut while appearing in Emmerdale in a production of Romeo and Juliet at the Theatre Royal, York playing Romeo. Fox's other stage credits include Salonika, Twelfth Night, A Midsummer Night's Dream and Too Cold for Snow.

== Filmography ==
=== Films ===
Year	Title	Role	Notes
1998	Elizabeth	Male Martyr	
2002	Deserter	Simon Murray	
2012	Red Tails	Captain Miller	
2013	Dead of the Nite	Paul	
2014	Some Kind of Beautiful	Young Gordon	
2018	The Reckoning of Darkness	Victor Frankenstein	Short film
2019	After	Soccer game announcer	Voice
2019	Ford v Ferrari	British commentator	Voice
2020	Middleton Christmas	Mr. Phillips	
2020	Mank	Joe von Sternberg	
2021	Tuxedo Terrace	Lorenzo	Short film
2024	Witchy Ways	Fred	

=== Television series ===
Year	Title	Role	Notes
1995	Hearts and Minds	Tony	3 episodes
1996	Children's Ward	Tim O'Halloran	
1997–1999	Emmerdale	Will Cairns	143 episodes
1999–2001, 2006	Coronation Street	Mark Redman	96 episodes
2000	Life Force	Greg Webber	13 episodes
2000	City Central	Denny	Episode: "No Direction Home"
2003–2004	Starhunter	Marcus Fagen	3 episodes
2003–2007	The Royal	Dr Jeff Goodwin	43 episodes
2008	Doctors	Cal Robinson	Episode: "Groomed for the Game"
2008	Casualty	Simon Tanner	(8 episodes)
2009	Moving On	Mike	Episode: "The Rain Has Stopped"
2013	Our Girl	Sergeant Lamont	Episode: "Pilot"
2017	Westworld	Young Robert Ford	3 episodes
2017	Teen Wolf	Grenadier Abel	Episode: "Blitzkrieg"
2020	SEAL Team	Isaac Craig	2 episodes
2020	Sydney to the Max	Drexel	Episode: "Baby One More Rhyme"
2022	Reasonable Doubt	Theo James	6 episodes
2023	The Burning Girls	Reverend Fletcher	2 episodes

=== Video games ===
Year	Title	Role
2011	Dragon Age II	Corff the Bartender / Hanged Man patron / Follower of She
2014	Dragon Age: Inquisition	Herald's Rest patron
2023	Remnant 2	Dran
2024	Abiotic Factor	The Blacksmith
2025	Dune: Awakening	Additional voices
