= Waterloo Road series 11 =

Waterloo Road
- Series 11
- DVD cover
- Starring: James Baxter; Jo Coffey; Neil Fitzmaurice; Angela Griffin; Vincent Jerome; Rachel Leskovac; Kym Marsh; Katherine Pearce; Shauna Shim; Adam Thomas
- No. of episodes: 7

Release
- Original network: BBC One; BBC One HD; BBC iPlayer
- Original release: 3 January – 14 February 2023

Series chronology
- ← Previous; Series 10 Next → Series 12

The eleventh series of the British television series Waterloo Road originally aired on BBC One in the United Kingdom between 3 January and 14 February 2023. This series marks the first series of Waterloo Road since the show was cancelled after the tenth series in 2015. The series follows the staff and pupils of the fictional Waterloo Road High School in Greater Manchester. Co-produced by Wall to Wall and Rope Ladder Fiction, the series was executively produced by Cameron Roach, Gaynor Holmes and Jo McClellan. The revival was announced in September 2021. The decision to revive the drama was inspired by the high viewership figures of the original series after it was made a box set on the BBC iPlayer.

Approximately 130 people worked on the series: 50 cast members and 80 members of the production team. Four actors reprise their roles from the original series, bridging the two iterations of the drama. A six-month production development training scheme was created to support entry into television production, with 20 trainees produced as a result. Seven hour-long episodes were commissioned for the series. It was promoted through trailers, promotional images and a red carpet premiere held in Stockport. In addition to weekly broadcast, the series was released as a box set on BBC iPlayer. A podcast, consisting of nine episodes, was also launched.

The series explores a range of topical issues facing schools, pupils and parents in Britain following the COVID-19 pandemic. These issues were deemed perfect for exploration through Waterloo Road. The series also established opportunity to provide visibility for underrepresented groups. Multiple stories were explored in each episode of the series. The death of Chlo Charles (Katie Griffiths), a surprise twist in the opening episode, serves as a catalyst for several stories in the series. In addition to the school-centric plots, writers also explored attention deficit hyperactivity disorder (ADHD), the cost of living crisis in the UK, bulimia nervosa, amongst other stories.

The show's revival attracted a mixed response upon its announcement. Many praised the decision and thought it would be a good platform for young talent, however Jim Waterson of The Guardian did not believe it justified the axing of Holby City. Charlotte Moore, the chief content officer at BBC, defended the revival against criticism and felt it was "reimagined for the modern day". Whilst the show attracted poor overnight ratings, it was reportedly popular with a younger audience on BBC iPlayer. Like the announcement, the actual series received a mixed reception from television critics and viewers alike. In particular, Chlo's death was heavily criticised with Hannah Van De Peer of The Tab deeming the choice "random". Contrastingly, Kelly Jo's ADHD story was highly praised by critics and special needs organisations; Eleanor Noyce from the Radio Times called Kelly Jo's ADHD story "a particular standout" of the revival.

== Cast ==
Series eleven cast

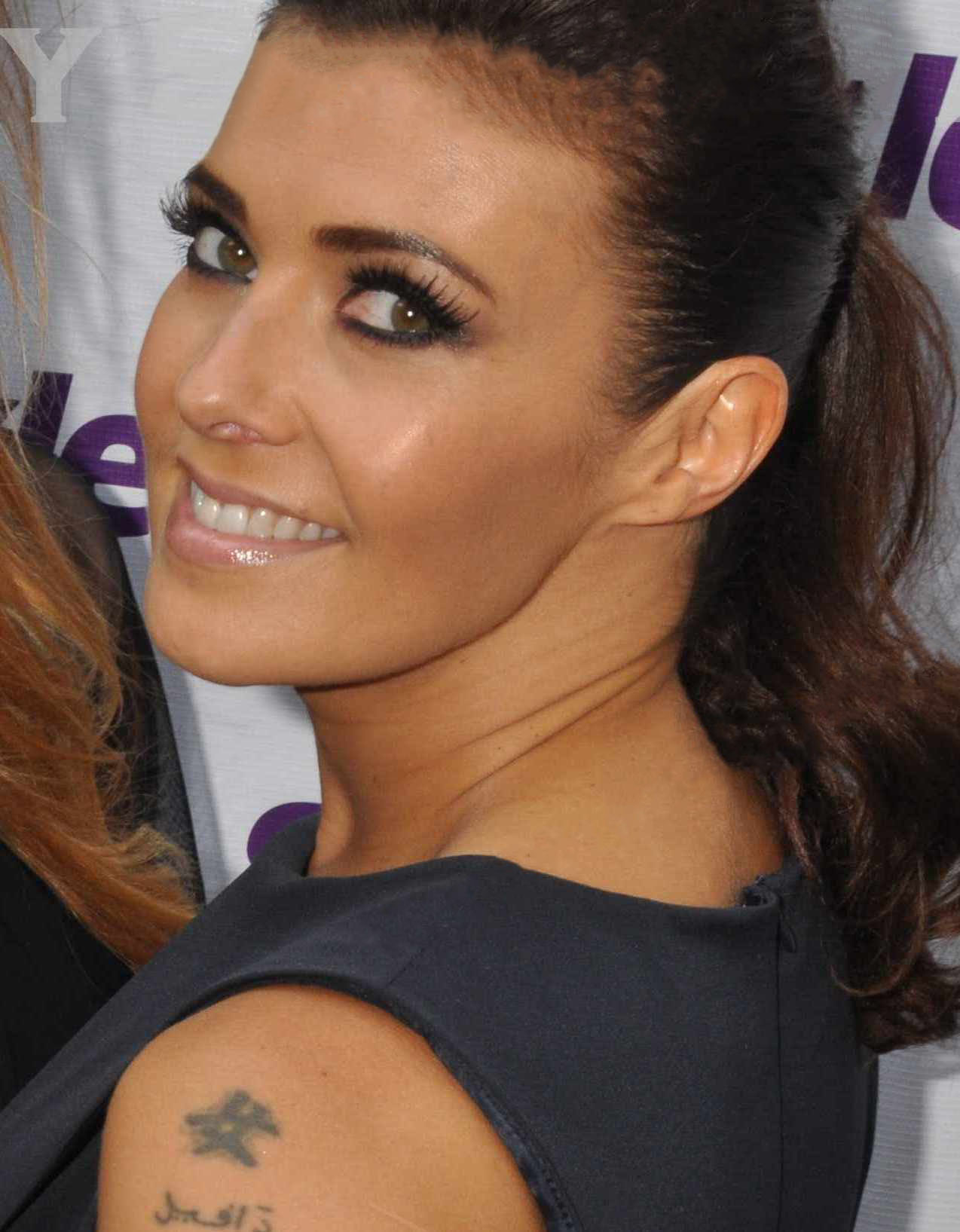
Kym Marsh plays Nicky Walters.

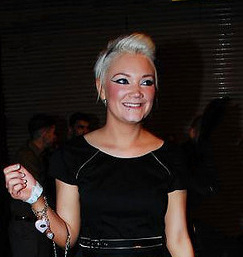
Hollie-Jay Bowes appears in two episodes as Debs Rafferty.

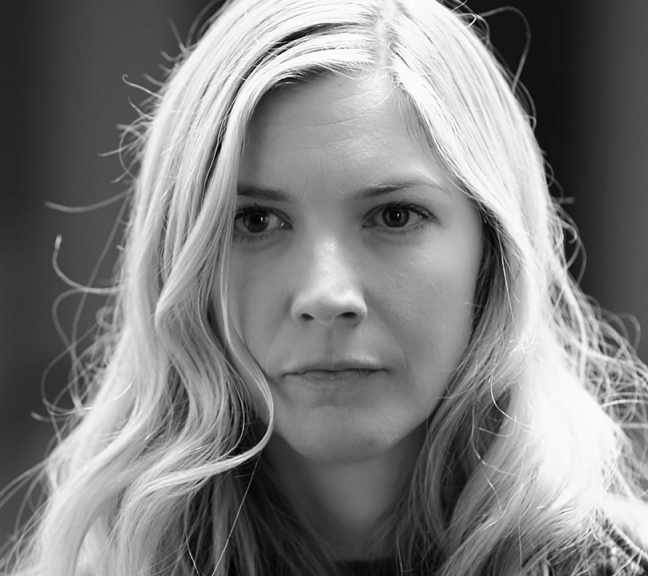
Lisa Faulkner guest stars as Hannah King.

=== Main cast ===
- Angela Griffin as Kim Campbell
- James Baxter as Joe Casey
- Jo Coffey as Wendy Whitwell
- Neil Fitzmaurice as Neil Guthrie
- Vincent Jerome as Lindon King
- Rachel Leskovac as Coral Walker
- Kym Marsh as Nicky Walters
- Katherine Pearce as Amy Spratt
- Shauna Shim as Valerie Chambers
- Adam Thomas as Donte Charles

=== Supporting cast ===
- Adam Abbou as Danny Lewis
- Randi Agyare as Millie Adebayo
- Adam Ali as Kai Sharif
- Lucy Begg as Caz Williams
- Summer Bird as Tonya Walters
- Ava Flannery as Verity King
- Alicia Forde as Kelly Jo Rafferty
- Priyasasha Kumari as Samia Choudhry
- Francesco Piacentini-Smith as Dean Weever
- Thapelo Ray as Dwanye Jackson
- Inathi Rozani as Zayne Jackson
- Liam Scholes as Noel McManus
- Scarlett Thomas as Izzy Charles
- Chiamaka Ulebor as Shola Aku
- Noah Valentine as Preston Walters

=== Recurring cast ===
- Hollie-Jay Bowes as Deborah "Debs" Rafferty
- Lisa Faulkner as Hannah King
- Sonia Ibrahim as Jamilah Omar
- Sahil Ismailkhil as Norullah Sayyid
- Elliott Longworth as Jake West
- Teddy Thomas as Tommy Charles
- Sue Vincent as Erica Thorn

=== Guest cast ===
- Ryan Clayton as Mike Rutherford
- Marie Critchley as Barbara Rafferty
- Sofia Danu as Salma Sharif
- Billy Dunmore as Fred
- Alicya Eyo as Marie Lewis
- Barrie Greenwood as Rolf Higgins
- Katie Griffiths as Chlo Charles
- Jake Haymes as Ryan Capper
- Chelsee Healey as Janeece Bryant
- Lee Lomas as Mac
- Jason Milligan as Vinnie McCullen
- Jonathan Ojinnaka as Jamie Bedford
- William Thompson as Pete
- Lamin Touray as Reece Megson

== Production ==
=== Conception and development ===
In September 2021, it was announced that Waterloo Road had been revived, after its cancellation in 2015. The new series is co-produced by Wall to Wall and Rope Ladder Fiction, and is executively produced by Cameron Roach, Gaynor Holmes and Jo McClellan. It is set, filmed and produced in Greater Manchester. Piers Wenger, the director of BBC Drama, commissioned the new series as part of plans from the BBC to make more programming across the country with the intention to better reflect it. This initiative led to the cancellation of Holby City in June 2021, with Waterloo Road replacing it. Wenger was pleased to reprise the show and praised it for "its thrills and spills, unmissable characters and high drama". On the drama's revival, Roach commented, "Waterloo Road will continue its reputation for kickstarting, supporting and enabling careers both in front of and behind the camera, in a truly inclusive way, from our base in Greater Manchester."

The decision to revive the drama was inspired by the high viewership figures of the original series after it was made a box set on the BBC iPlayer. In 2021, it became the fourth most popular series of the year, with 45 million streams. Roach opined that the drama is a popular and well-loved brand, which made it "ripe for reinvention". Original cast member Katie Griffiths was surprised by the show's popularity through these boxsets and thought it was "exciting" that they opted to revive the show. Additionally, a revival for the drama would create relatable content for young viewers, who BBC executives were seeking to add to their viewership.

Angela Griffin, one of the show's leading cast members, felt the revival would maintain some of the qualities of the original Waterloo Road, but it would be more relevant to modern day. Actor Vincent Jerome also thought this and observed that "the fun, energy, excitement and telling of real world stories" would continue into the revival, but with more representation through its cast. The show features a range of characters, which Jerome felt meant that "anybody can relate to any one of our characters", even if not in the traditional sense. Young actor Adam Ali felt that the characters were "reflections of society" and provided an opportunity to see "people from different walks of life coming together and dealing with the world". Griffin wanted the audience to feel a sense of belonging in the series and hoped the characters could provide comfort to those watching. Cast member Adam Thomas echoed this thought and believed that the show's revival would open the door for conversations surrounding some of its "difficult subjects". He felt it was important they made these conversation accessible and hoped the show would spark discussion in schools too. Roach wanted the drama to be "a real celebration of what it is to be British today". He hoped to continue some of the core values of the original series: the "larger than life", "big hearted, quick witted and iconic" characters and stories. Echoing this, he wanted the revival to spark important conversation between friends and colleagues. Griffin wanted the primary purpose of the series to be entertainment; she commented, "ultimately, I want [the audience] to just really bloody enjoy it and I want them to fall in love with the characters".

Filming for the series took place at the former site of St Ambrose Barlow Roman Catholic High School in Wardley, Greater Manchester. Filming commenced on 21 February 2022. Working on the series are approximately 130 people: 50 cast members and 80 members of the production team. The show's series producer was Lindsay Williams, and it was produced by Adam Leatherland. The show's story producer is Diane Ferrier, who heads up a story team consisting of: Yasmin Ali, Amy Coombes, Ethan Deplitch, Georgia Ince, Nana-Kofi Kufuor, Hannah Lee and Joe Morris. The story team also worked closely with the BBC Writersroom on a shadow scheme for writers and directors. Liz Lake, Neil Jones and Lisa Holdsworth were responsible for writing the first episodes. Kat Rose-Martin was also hired to write two episodes of the series. The lead director is Jesse Quinones, with other directors from the series including Paulette Randall and Makalla McPherson. On 21 April 2022, Amanda Mealing revealed, via social media, that she would direct on the series. Griffin confirmed in a January 2023 interview with Armand Beasley of Great British Life that she would be directing two episodes of Waterloo Road.

=== Production training scheme ===
Roach and the BBC wanted to use the drama to create "a training ground for new and diverse writers", and in December 2021, a six-month production development training scheme was announced. Eight trainee positions were created with the job based in Salford. Applications were open for residents of Greater Manchester. The show's production companies worked with Screen Manchester and HOME Manchester for the scheme. Roach explained that they wanted to "build a reputation for encouraging and educating individuals" in different areas of television production. Elli Metcalfe of Screen Manchester thought the scheme would support crew shortages in the industry. Leanne Klein from Wall to Wall Media looked forward to training "the next generation of crew in the north".

Griffin liked the promotion of Northern talent and how the show increased behind-the-scenes representation of class and gender. Following a successful first scheme, the production companies decided to reopen applications for a second six-month programme, commencing in August 2022. The initial training scheme, which lasted from February 2022, produced 20 trainees for working on the drama. Two trainees from the original scheme - Zane Igbe and Sabbina Aslam - were then hired onto the production team. Speaking to Rachael Hesno from Prolific North, Igbe and Aslam both praised the scheme for creating a gateway into television production.

=== Casting ===
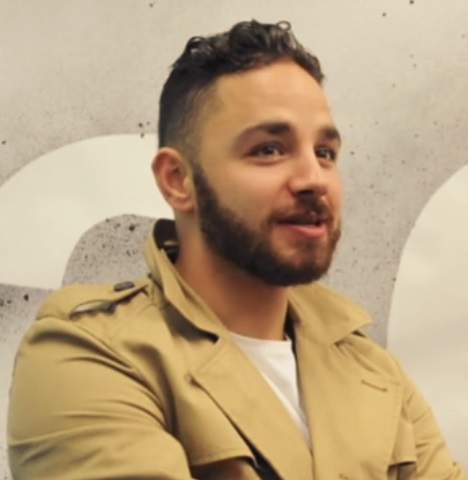
Adam Thomas reprised his role as Donte Charles.

It was reported on 30 November 2021 that Adam Thomas, who portrayed Donte Charles in the first four series, would return. Thomas' return was confirmed on 24 January 2022, alongside that of original cast members Angela Griffin and Katie Griffiths, in their respective roles as Kim Campbell and Chlo Charles. Kim is now the school's headteacher. All three cast members spoke of their delight at reprising the role and exploring their characters again. This marks Thomas's return to acting following his departure from Emmerdale in 2018. Thomas admitted that he was washing up in his restaurant when he got a call from the casting director inviting him to discuss reprising the role with Roach. He was excited about the idea of a revival, but tried to "act cool" in front of Roach. Afterwards, he then had to wait for the revival to be green-lit. Griffin accredited the show's stories and Roach's commitment for finding new talent to her decision to return to Waterloo Road.

In February 2022, it was reported that Chelsee Healey was in discussions with producers to reprise her role as Janeece Bryant, a role she portrayed across six series. Healey is a regular cast member in Hollyoaks, which sparked rumours she may leave the soap. A Hollyoaks spokesperson confirmed she would not be leaving Hollyoaks but may also appear in Waterloo Road. Despite not being officially announced, the character returned for a cameo appearance in the second episode of the series.

Nine additional regular cast members were announced on 10 February 2022, portraying members of the school's staff. The announcement was made via a video on the show's social media channels. Roach expressed his excitement at announcing the cast and commented, "we're creating some new iconic characters for the next generation of Waterloo Road". Kym Marsh was cast as Nicky Walters, a school canteen worker and mother to two schoolchildren. Marsh was pleased to return to Manchester to film the series. Vincent Jerome and James Baxter joined the show as co-deputy headteachers Lindon King and Joe Casey, respectively. Jo Coffey plays Wendy Whitwell, the headteacher's personal assistant. Shauna Shim and Neil Fitzmaurice were cast as music teacher Valerie Chambers and history teacher Neil Guthrie, respectively. Rachel Leskovac portrays Coral Walker, the head of English, and Katherine Pearce appears in the role of Amy Spratt, an early careers teacher (ECT). Sonia Ibrahim also joins the show as Jamilah Omar, a social worker.

Ryan Clayton revealed on 17 February 2022 that he had begun filming on the series as Mike Rutherford. A show spokesperson told Sam Warner from Digital Spy that he had been cast in a semi-regular role. Days later, Thomas announced the cast portraying the students during an appearance on Morning Live, with an image of the younger cast released by the show's publicity team. The actor's niece, Scarlett Thomas, was cast in the role of Izzy Charles, the daughter of Donte and Chloe. The role marked Scarlett Thomas' first acting job. Noah Valentine and Summer Violet Bird were cast in the respective roles of Preston Walters and Tonya Walters, the children of Nicky. Producers searched for cast members and background artists at schools local to the Greater Manchester area. After being scouted during a trip to a Leeds school, Sahil Ismailkhil was cast as Norrulah Ashimi. Other actors portraying the student characters include: Adam Abbou (Danny Lewis); Priyasasha Kumari (Samia Choudhry); Adam Ali (Kai Sharif); Alicia Forde (Kelly Jo Rafferty); Francesco Piacentini-Smith (Dean Weever); Liam Scholes (Noel McManus); Lucy Eleanor Begg (Caz Williams); Ava Flannery (Verity King); Thapelo Ray (Dwanye Jackson); Inathi Rozani (Zayne Jackson); and Chiamaka "ChiChi" Ulebor (Shola Aku). Aku was invited to submit a recorded audition by the casting team and found the role to be daunting. The younger cast were praised by Griffin, who called them "quite phenomenal" and noted that "they work their socks off".

Teddy Thomas, the son of Adam Thomas, was cast as Tommy Charles, the son of Donte and Chlo. The role was initially awarded to another child actor, but when they resigned, Thomas was invited to play the character. Adam Thomas spoke of his joy to act alongside his son. He later admitted that it became difficult working on set with both Teddy and Scarlett, but overall, it was "an amazing experience for us all". The casting of Lisa Faulkner in the role of Hannah King, the wife of Lindon, was announced on 5 November 2022. Hollie-Jay Bowes was also cast in the series as Debs, the sister of Nicky and mother of Kelly Jo. Alicya Eyo guest stars in one episode as Marie Lewis, the mother of Danny. Jason Milligan was cast in the final episode as Vinnie McCullen, the criminal partner of Marie. Milligan is the husband of Griffin, who was excited to be working on the same project as her husband. Despite this, the couple were never on set at the same time, which disappointed Griffin.

When asked about any other original cast reprising their roles in the revival, Adam Thomas revealed that the cast for this series would include "a few surprises". He also told Alice Penwill from Inside Soap that Tom Payne (who played Brett Aspinall in the original series) was interested in filming "a couple of episodes".

== Storyline development ==
=== Themes ===
"Our writers are telling stories with truth and conviction; this is not cynical TV, this is TV that celebrates life and community and demands attention. Noisy but with a MASSIVE heart. We are Waterloo Road."

— Executive producer Cameron Roach on the show's storytelling. (2023)

Producers created topical stories for the series, wanting to highlight the issues facing schools, pupils and parents in Britain following the COVID-19 pandemic. Wenger felt that schoolchildren were most-affected by the pandemic and Waterloo Road was "the perfect lens" to explore this. Roach explained that the issues in schools created "incredible and emotionally powerful themes" for the show. Scriptwriter Liz Lake opined that Waterloo Road is "a campaigning show with social realism in its DNA".

This series explores issues such as teen homelessness, being LGBTQ+, racism, sexism, mental health issues, knife crime, refugee children, and the cost of living crisis in the UK. The issues explored within the show were deemed perfect for exploration through Waterloo Road by Roach. Likewise, Griffiths noted how the show has "never been scared of tackling all the big issues", and Kumari said that the topical stories would be "captivating and really resonate with the topics of today's society". Piacentini-Smith opined that Waterloo Road created a platform for these issues to be at the "forefront" and make those not directly impacted think. Ulebor felt that the show's themes were "relatable" and could "make you feel like you’re not alone". Marsh believed that the series offered more opportunities for discussion of issues that are "in the foreground of people's lives right now". She added that it could manage to educate its audience without realising this. Valentine told Victoria Wilson from What to Watch he wanted the themes to spark discussions in homes. He commented, "Waterloo Road reflects modern views for a more modern era but does it in a grounded way."

The revival offered opportunity for visibility of underrepresented groups. For accurate portrayals of topics, actors with lived experiences became involved in the writing process where applicable. Queer Arab Muslim visibility was explored through the character of Kai; Ali praised the exploration without the use of a "queer tragedy story cliche". The character of Samia promoted "fierce, empowering" South Asian representation, as opined by Kumari. She praised how Samia defies stereotypes and vocalises her beliefs for her and her classmates. The actress was also pleased with the representation of an interracial relationship, noting how it was not addressed and made "a 'thing'".

In addition to these issues, writers also wanted to explore the friendships and relationships between characters, as well as including some comedic moments. Griffin explained that writers wanted to balance the exploration of heavy topics with the fun that can be achieved in an "entertainment show". The actress felt that there were plenty of "relevant" issues to be explored through the series. In particular, Griffin wanted discussions to be held regarding the impact of the pandemic on schools and Waterloo Road presented a great opportunity for this. Lake thought it would be wrong not to address the current movements which have impacted society since the show last broadcast in 2015. To accurately portray these issues, the cast performed research and spoke to those impacted by these issues. Abbou found that speaking to people was more beneficial than researching online. Forde researched for her role using information on the operation of different brains as well as from watching Educating Greater Manchester.

=== Chlo's death ===
Donte and Chlo Charles appear in the original series as students of the school; in their last appearance, Chlo gives birth to their daughter, Izzy, named after Izzie Redpath. The pair return in this series as parents to two children, Izzy and Tommy, establishing the Charles family unit, who would become prominent figures throughout the series. The first episode follows the family as Izzy starts her first day at secondary school. Griffiths felt that Chlo had adopted a "matriarchal role in the family" with a "fierce determination" to protect her family. Thomas thought that although Donte is a good father, he would "be lost" without Chlo and her support. He explained that the family are in "a happy place" at the beginning of the series, but teased that this would be disturbed. He enjoyed seeing how the characters had progressed from the original series. Griffiths pointed out that Chlo is at "a crossroads" in her life and is considering how she could apply her skills at the school.

In the opening episode, the character of Chlo was killed off, which had been embargoed until broadcast. Griffiths was surprised by the decision to kill her character off, but found the most important feeling to be excitement about the show's revival. She told Phoebe Jobling of the Manchester Evening News that she was primarily grateful for the opportunity to play Chlo again and to work opposite Thomas. Chlo's death developed a leading story for the revival as Donte copes with his grief and supports his children. Thomas was surprised by the decision to kill the character and had been excited for Donte and Chlo to have their own family. He was informed in his first meeting following the series' confirmation, and felt "gutted" by the twist. The actor explained that although he wanted to work with Griffiths for longer, he was grateful for the story opportunities it created for his character. He added that it created "dramatic shock factor" in the first episode. Thomas told Duncan Lindsay of the Metro that Chlo had a lot of responsibility in the family home, which Donte has to "step up to the plate" and take on.

Chlo's death became a "catalyst" for other stories in the series. One main story was the journey of grief that Donte goes on during the series. As he commenced filming on the plot, Thomas' father died; the story helped the actor deal with his grief for his father. He also researched the impact of grief to aid his portrayal. The character of Neil was incorporated into Donte's story of grief; Neil's backstory states he is a widower. Fitzmaurice explained that Donte "gravitates" towards Neil. In addition to Donte, the impact Chlo's death has on her children was explored. As Donte "withdraws", Izzy takes on more responsibility in the family home, supporting her father. Thomas branded Izzy "the rock [Donte] needed". Griffiths predicted that Scarlett Thomas and Teddy Thomas would be a triumph for the show and play the story well.

A story was developed for Coral, having been responsible for the car accident which kills Chlo. Leskovac was shocked when she read the scripts, having recently rewatched the original series and become invested in Donte and Chlo's relationship. She was worried that she would be hated by the audience, but was reassured by the writing of the character. Leskovac recognised that the accident "sends [Coral] on a trajectory of being a ticking time bomb". She told the show's press team that she hoped the story would make her character "more humanised", having initially been portrayed as "complex" and "controlling" before Chlo's death. Coral's story climaxes when an inquest into Chlo's death occurs. Leskovac told Penwill (Inside Soap) that Coral feels guilty and pressurised by the inquest, having had to speak to Chlo's family daily. The actress admitted to finding the story "massively challenging and so emotional". She noted how she had to "go into a dark place" to portray Coral's more challenging emotions, and would sometimes struggle to switch off after filming.

=== Other stories ===
The series opener features a "peaceful protest" which turns into a riot, creating "huge ramifications for everyone involved". Griffin branded the first episode "a lively opening to a powerful series". In the narrative, the students are protesting against the school being named after William Beswick, a historic slave trader. Griffin explained that the students feel "really strongly" about the protest, which Kim has to negotiate. She told Sue Haasler of the Metro that the students are "so politicised" and have "a voice that they want to be heard". She teased that the school term starts with "a whole new attitude". The protest highlighted the change in the character of Kim. Griffin pointed out that previously, Kim would have "been protesting with the kids", but now, she needs to be "diplomatic". Comparing the new series to the original, Griffin opined that in the original, students would have protested about "Turkey Twizzlers on the menu" rather than the meaningful issues dealt with the current series. In a press release interview, Griffin explained that there was "vast" differences between the challenges faced by children in the original series and in the revival. She named social media as the main challenge, which she stated would be explored throughout the revival.

One story in the series follows Kim in her new position as headteacher. Griffin learnt of her character's new role in the early stages of production and found it amazing, calling it a "prestigious" role. The character is entering her second year as headteacher, following a series of complex political movements. Griffin wanted to look at how Kim adapts to the new role, having stemmed from a pastoral role. Griffin explained that as headteacher, Kim cannot "help every individual kid" even if she would want to. She told Penwill (Inside Soap) that headteacher is not "the natural path" for Kim. Griffin researched the demands on the role by speaking to real life headteachers. She found that there is an immense pressure on headteachers following the changes to education. Kim's attitude in her new position creates a story of conflict between her and some of the staff. In a press release, Griffin explained that Kim is "not there to be liked, she's there to manage". However, she did recognise that "warm and friendly" characterisation was portrayed at times, which strengthen her bonds with her colleagues. The character's backstory from her time away from the series is also explored. Kim has experienced a "trauma" and closed herself off emotionally. Griffin noted that since her last appearance, Kim "has changed as a human being". As part of this, writers made a conscious decision to have Kim spend less time with individual children.

As the revival created multiple new characters for the series, the show's story team developed these characters through stories and their personalities. To allow the actors to develop their characters and relationships, Roach and Williams created "a safe space" for the actors, which Leskovac thought helped to make "a natural chemistry" between the cast so the audience could see Waterloo Road as a pre-existing world. Jerome avoided watching the original series, but did eventually watch in preparation for some scenes between his character and Donte, so that he could develop an understanding of the character. Lindon and Joe, the deputy headteachers, were established as complete opposites. On this a press officer commented, "If Lindon represents the sharp-suited professional edge of the senior management team, then Joe is the laid-back alternative." Jerome described Lindon as "old school" and "no nonsense", whereas Baxter described Joe as "approachable" and "on a level with the kids". Writers developed a rivalry between Lindon and Joe, primarily from Lindon's perspective. Baxter explained that although their teaching styles differ, this can work to their advantage. He liked when the pair worked together and formed "a really nice dynamic". Both characters are introduced with families, including children at the school. Lindon and his wife Hannah have a daughter, Verity, who is starting secondary school. Joe has a "tight family unit" with his husband, police officer Mike, and their two foster children, Dwayne and Zayne. The boys have lived with Joe and Mike for 18 months.

The drama explored attention deficit hyperactivity disorder (ADHD) using the character of Kelly Jo, with the development of the story running over the span of the series. Writers designed the story progression so the character appears "chaotic" until the fourth episode, where an explanation for her personality is revealed. The story takes focus in this episode as Kelly Jo experiences sensory overload and has a "meltdown", leading to her teacher suggesting an ADHD diagnosis. Forde researched the condition to aid her portrayal; her primary research focused on how different brains operate. She wanted to showcase that actually Kelly Jo was more than her condition and is "a young girl finding herself". As part of the story, Kelly Jo's mother Debs was introduced; Bowes was formally diagnosed with ADHD during the transmission of the story. Consequently, she related to the plot and found that it helped her. Bowes also praised Forde's performance throughout the story.

Through the Walters family, the impact of cost-of-living crisis was explored. The family is headed by proud matriarch Nicky, who recently lost her beauty business and has taken up a second job in the school's canteen. Marsh explained that for the family financially, "it's as bad as it can get". Nicky prides herself on keeping up appearances, including with her children; Marsh pointed out that Nicky does not want to appear "struggling or failing" and tries protecting her children like mothers do. To showcase how Nicky keeps up appearances, the makeup department dressed the character in full glamorous makeup. Writers had Nicky's financial problems climax in episode 3 when bailiffs arrive at their house. The family struggle and have to go to school with all their remaining belongings. Marsh admitted that Nicky is actually trying to "convince herself more than anyone else". The show also explored Nicky's children's responses to the situation. Marsh pointed out that Preston is supportive of his mother, whereas Tonya is more "intolerant". She added that Preston is facing pressure from this situation as well as his own story. The story was something which Marsh could personally resonate with, having experienced financial hardship as a young mother in her early 20s.

The topic of bulimia was explored through the character of Preston. Valentine researched the condition to understand it better for his performance. He wanted to understand Preston better and hoped to "get a grip of the psychology of the character". Preston's story is slow-burning across the series. He is initially characterised as a "cocky, [...] confident, [...] arrogant [...] stereotypical athlete" who is in a relationship with cheerleader Samia. Valentine dubbed Preston and Samia as "the golden couple of Waterloo Road, who try to navigate school as a team". The couple encounter problems when Samia learns about a list rating the school's female students which Preston is involved with; they end their relationship. Valentine enjoyed portraying a character with mystery and said that he had to "bend [his] moral compass" to truly understand his character's logic. Writers created a surprising twist in the character's development as he kisses Kai during a party, sparking an exploration into the character's sexuality.

== Promotion and release ==
Seven hour-long episodes were commissioned for the series, which premiered in the United Kingdom on BBC One and BBC iPlayer on 3 January 2023. The number of episodes was a reduction on the original series, which normally consists of 20 episodes. It marked the shortest series in the show's history. Hayley Anderson of the Daily Express thought a shorter series duration would allow BBC executives to understand if there was an audience for the drama. The series was initially scheduled to be broadcast in 2022. Digital Spy's Iona Rowan thought it would be apt for the series to premiere in September 2022, in line with English schools beginning their new academic year. On 15 October 2022, the first teaser trailer was released, featuring the show's new orange logo. The show's set was previewed in a clip from Strictly Come Dancing as Marsh rehearsed with her dance partner Graziano Di Prima on-set. The first promotional images from the series were released on 25 November 2022.

The opening episode was previewed at a red carpet premiere in Stockport on 30 November 2022. The show's cast attended the premiere, with Griffin, Adam Thomas, Griffiths and executive producer Roach taking part in an interview panel, led by radio presenter Natalie O'Leary. The premiere could be attended by members of public, with tickets available to purchase. Executives decided to hold the premiere in Stockport in recognition of the show's return to Northern England. McClellan thought it was good way to celebrate the revival and liked that it would be shared with local fans first.

The official premiere date was announced on 6 December 2022, and a trailer for the series was released on 12 December 2022. Episodes were broadcast every Tuesday on BBC One in the 20:00 time slot formerly occupied by Holby City. However, due to scheduling conflicts with the 2022–23 FA Cup, episode 3 was broadcast on a Wednesday night. The series concluded in the United Kingdom on 14 February 2023. All seven episodes were also released on 3 January 2023 as part of a box set on BBC iPlayer. Additionally, episodes were repeated on BBC Three. The decision to upload the full series on BBC iPlayer as a box set was met with criticism from viewers, who felt that some twists were spoiled in advance. The series was distributed on DVD in the United Kingdom by Dazzler Media and the BBC and released on 10 April 2023. Premiering in conjunction to the main series, a podcast - Waterloo Road – The Official Podcast - was also launched on 19 December 2022. Thomas and Kumari host the podcast, which features different cast members in each episodes. In total, nine episodes of the podcast were created, with eight of them released on 3 January 2023.

== Episodes ==
No. overall	No. in series	Episode	Directed by	Written by	Original release date	UK viewers (millions)
201	1	Episode 1	Jesse Quiñones	Liz Lake	3 January 2023	N/A (<3.34) (Note: Not reported in the weekly top 50 programmes.)
It is the first day of a new school year at William Beswick High School and the first day for early career teacher Amy and Year 9 pupil Izzy. Pupils establish a peaceful protest against the school being named after a historic slave trader, after the local education authority (LEA) ignore their concerns. However, the protest escalates and disturbs neighbouring streets, creating traffic. Becoming overwhelmed by the disruption, Coral bumps her car into that in front of her, which in turn, knocks Chlo over while she is crossing the street. Chlo's injuries appear superficial and Amy gives her first aid for a sprained wrist. Later that morning, former pupil Danny is found in the boiler room, where he and his dog, Angel, have been living over the summer holidays. He is allowed to reenrol and social worker Jamilah finds him a room in a local hostel. Kim meets with Erica, an LEA representative, and threatens to resign; Erica agrees to a school rebrand of Waterloo Road High School. That evening, Chlo suddenly collapses at home and is rushed to hospital. At the hospital, her husband Donte is informed that she has died of an internal head injury.
202	2	Episode 2	Jesse Quiñones	Neil Jones	10 January 2023	N/A (<2.95)
Donte is struggling as Chlo's funeral approaches; he blames the school for Chlo's death and accuses Amy of not noticing her injuries. Kim and Shola leave the funeral when Donte becomes angry; as they leave, Kim points out her son Dexter's gravestone. Donte leaves the funeral and is met by Janeece, who has arrived late; she convinces him to return and assists him with his speech. At school, Kim faces opposition about the rebrand: Neil disapproves and Nicky is concerned about the financial implications; she breaks down on Kim and explains she is struggling with the rising costs. Danny and Dean fight in the playground, so are sent to the behaviour unit (BU). Noel sneaks in cannabis, which Danny claims belongs to him when they are caught. Lindon calls the police, but Joe denies knowing where it came from.
203	3	Episode 3	Paulette Randall	Lisa Holdsworth	18 January 2023	N/A (<2.96)
The Walters family are evicted from their home. Preston asks his aunt, Debs, and grandmother, Barbara, if they can stay with them; Debbie agrees if Nicky apologises to her, but she refuses. Lindon pressures Preston by reminding him about his role as captain of the basketball team; after they lose a match, he has a panic attack and binge eats before vomiting. Nicky accidentally locks Coral in the freezer, but Donte eventually manages to free her; he decides to apply for the caretaker position. Nicky agrees to apologise to Debs and the family move in. Izzy returns to school and befriends Tonya; they play truant. Amy volunteers to be Izzy's contact and Coral questions her motives. Kai visits Danny at his hostel, but are confronted by Mac who threatens to report Danny for having guests. He threatens him again at school, but is chased away by Valerie. After learning that Kai was ejected from his home for being gay, Valerie contacts his sister, Salma, who disproves his statement; Danny is upset that Kai lied to him. Valerie tells Danny that his mother does not want contact with him and invites him to live with her.
204	4	Episode 4	Paulette Randall	Kellie Smith	24 January 2023	N/A (<2.95)
Amy organises a drama workshop and is surprised when her university friend, Fred, is the leader. He offers to repay her money he borrowed. Coral is annoyed by her students being taken off-timetable, so Kim makes her observe the workshop. Coral tells Amy to be stricter with the pupils and suggests she may not suit the job. When Kelly Jo struggles, Amy shouts at her and sits her out; Fred then quietly insults Kelly Jo, causing her to destroy the classroom and smash a window. Donte suggests she may have ADHD, like Tommy. Amy realises Fred was cruel to Kelly Jo and confronts him, so he belittles her, who in return orders him off the premises. Amy supports a distressed Kelly Jo, and they meet with Kim and Debs; Amy suggests that Kelly Jo has ADHD. She also tells Kim that she feels unsupported by Coral. Nicky tries supporting Preston after learning about his panic attack. Danny is annoyed when Kai arranges a party at Valerie's house, worried she will kick him out, but she supports it. Joe suggests that Donte and Neil, whose wives both died, attend a bereaved husbands' support group; Donte is confused when Neil says he is there to support him. At the pub, Kim and Lindon kiss.
205	5	Episode 5	Amanda Mealing	Paul Mousley	31 January 2023	N/A (<2.90)
Coral is struggling with trauma from the accident. She confiscates Norullah's phone after learning he has footage of the crash. At the inquest into Chlo's death, Coral confesses her involvement, but no individual cause is linked to Chlo's death; Donte confronts Coral, who defends herself. At school, Coral has a panic attack and is comforted by Kim; Izzy overhears Coral saying she feels guilty and informs Donte, who uses a sledgehammer to smash Coral's car. Neil befriends Norullah, an Afghan refugee, and learns about his backstory, including how his brother disappeared. Valerie and Neil are placed in charge of the student council elections. Shola and Noel win, but he is disappointed to realise it requires extra work. When she runs for it, Neil tells Tonya that she will not win. She reads a letter mentioning Neil's wife and decides that he killed her. Tonya, Dwayne, Verity and Zayne break into Neil's garden to find a body. Donte and Neil find them, so Neil admits that his wife actually left him and now wants to take his daughters to New Zealand. Donte leaves, annoyed with Neil's lying. Lindon tells his wife, Hannah, they need to separate, before kissing Kim.
206	6	Episode 6	Makalla McPherson	Kat Rose-Martin	7 February 2023	N/A (<2.94)
The basketball team prepare for a match watched by talent scout Jamie Bedford. Samia discovers the male students have a 'hot or not' group chat ranking the girls' attractiveness and believes that Dean started it. Samia questions Preston, her boyfriend, about the group, but he denies involvement. After reading the chat, she realises that Preston started it and confronts him before the match begins, but Lindon tells her to wait until after the match. Samia and the cheerleaders change their routine to highlight the boys objectifying their bodies. Samia breaks up with Preston. Erica, who is also watching the match, is appalled by the chat and leaves with Jamie. Lindon apologises and accidentally reveals about Donte smashing Coral's car. Kelly Jo and Dean begin a relationship after spending time together in the BU. Kim and Lindon ask Donte to attend an anger management course, but he refuses. Kim accidentally tells Hannah that Lindon wants a divorce. Danny meets his mother Marie; she tells him to return the money he stole from her boyfriend Vinnie. At Kai's party, Vinnie's friends threaten Danny until he displays a knife; Kai warns him to get rid of it. Preston kisses Kai.
207	7	Episode 7	Makalla McPherson	Neil Jones	14 February 2023	N/A (<2.89)
Coral informs Kim that she is resigning, but is persuaded otherwise. She apologises to Amy and Donte, who asks her to run a charity in Chlo's name. Donte forgives Neil and makes a wishing tree with Preston using destroyed car parts. Preston tells Kai that he does not regret their kiss and asks to meet after school. However, after failing to tell Nicky about his bulimia, he does not meet Kai and wishes to be a different person. Danny learns that he has passed his GCSE resits. Erica requests a meeting with Kim, so Lindon admits to telling her about Donte; Kim accuses Lindon of trying to take her job. The school hosts an end-of-term show, during which, Danny notices Vinnie; they fight and Danny stabs him. Valerie finds them but Danny runs away to the library. He is arrested and restrained when he tries to see Angel. Pupils hold a silent protest, which Lindon unsuccessfully prevents and Kim successfully ends. Danny is taken to a holding cell. A disillusioned Kim resigns and recommends Joe, but Erica offers Lindon the job; he rejects it, so Kim is invited back. Valerie hides the knife used by Danny.

== Reception ==
=== Announcement response ===
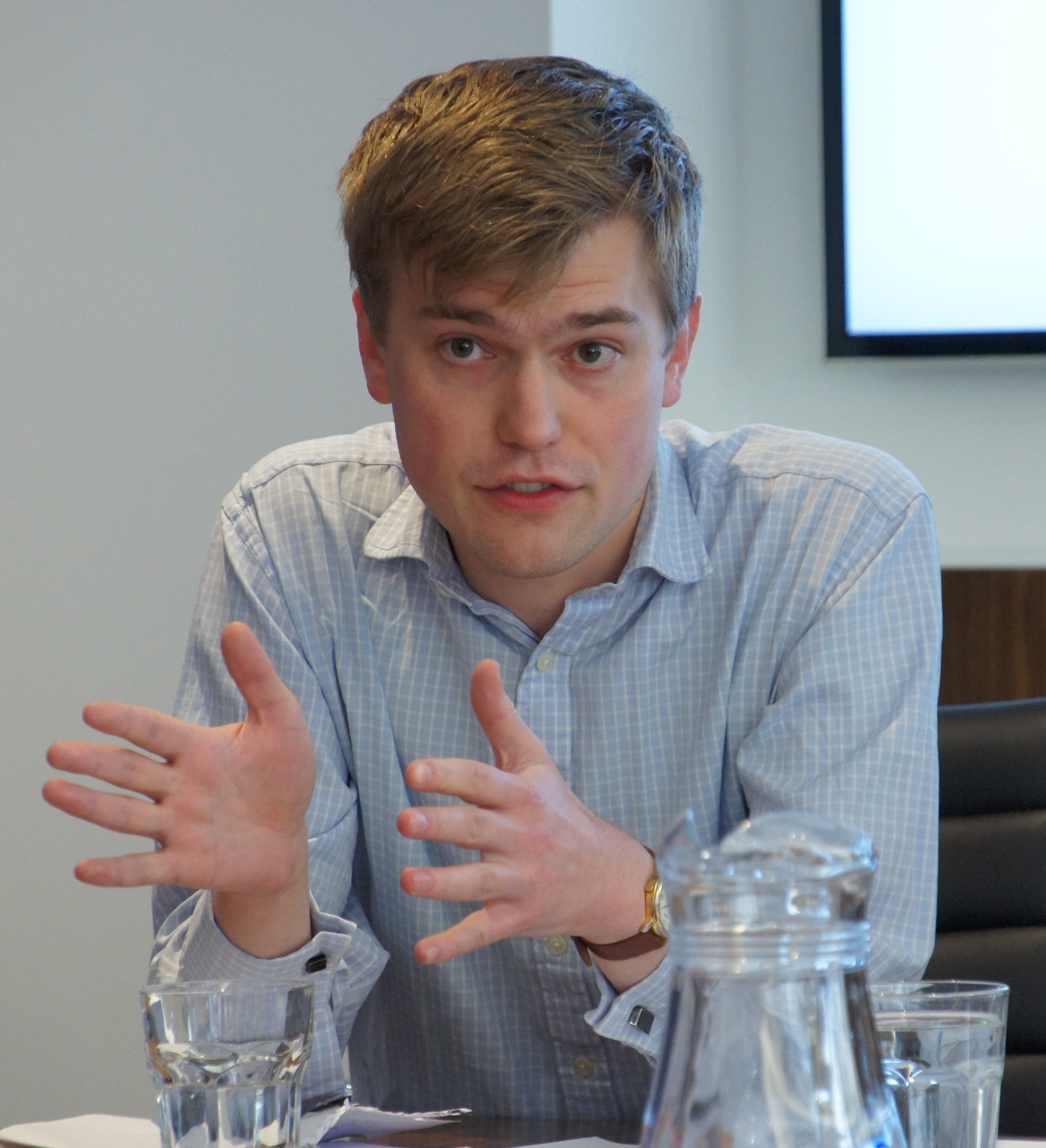
Jim Waterson (pictured) from The Guardian was critical of the show replacing Holby City.

News of the show's revival received a mixed response, as noted by a reporter from BBC News. Actors who had appeared in previous series praised the decision; Shane O'Meara opined that it provided a "platform" for young performers that is "rarely matched in British television". Heather Peace was pleased with the show's revival and predicted that "Waterloo Road now would be a very different Waterloo Road from then". Philip Martin Brown, the longest-serving cast member of the original series, wished the revival well in a social media post. The Radio Times' Joe Julians called the news "welcome" and noted that fans of the show were "delighted". Television critics, including Jim Waterson of The Guardian, disliked the decision and did not feel it justified the axing of Holby City. Jessica Sansome, writing for LancsLive, called the news "the big television news of the week". Heat's Asher Brandon wrote, "Everyone's beyond excited for the return of Waterloo Road".

Regarding the returns of Donte and Chloe, Katie Sullivan from The Tab wrote, "I can't wait to see Chlo and Donte all grown up." She was also keen to see Healey return as Janeece, commenting, "I hope [Janeece] does [return] as I'm desperate to know what Janeece has been up to". Bustle's Maxine Harrison noted that she was excited to see what Scarlett Thomas "has to offer".

Dan Seddon of Digital Spy opined that the series was "eagerly anticipated", while his colleague Jade Brown wrote, "We look forward to seeing what the reboot brings." Joe Anderton from the publication dubbed the series "one of the most anticipated 2023 TV events", and called it "a cause for celebration for fans". Adam Thomas dubbed the revival of Waterloo Road "the best series yet". Sue Haasler of the Metro observed, "Excitement is mounting for the return of school-based drama Waterloo Road". John Byrne from RTÉ included the opening episode in his television highlights feature and wrote, "Should be interesting to see how this revival goes." Lizo Mzimba, writing for BBC News, included the Waterloo Road revival in a feature on the "23 highlights to look out for in 2023".

Following criticism about show reboots, Charlotte Moore, the chief content officer at BBC, defended the revival of Waterloo Road at the Edinburgh TV Festival. She rejected concerns that it was a "depressing" concept and noted that it is "a real creative challenge" to revive a show. She added that the decision to revive shows require good judgement and that having watched the new series, Moore described it as "reimagined for the modern day".

In 2017, Channel 4 commissioned school-based drama Ackley Bridge, which drew comparisons to Waterloo Road. The Daily Mirror's Ian Hyland thought that Channel 4 executives were wanting to "tap into that same audience". The revival of Waterloo Road created discussions about the potential impact on Ackley Bridge. Sunetra Sarker, who appears in Ackley Bridge, dismissed these rumours and did not think the shows co-existing would prevent viewers from enjoying both dramas. She added, "Waterloo Road is not the same as Ackley Bridge". Sarker's co-star, Rob James-Collier, praised the decision to revive Waterloo Road and thought it created new opportunities for those in the industry. On any potential impact for the two dramas, James-Collier thought that the revival would "force [Ackley Bridge] to up our game as well, in a good way". Ackley Bridge was cancelled by Channel 4 in November 2022. Some fans of the show blamed the decision on Waterloo Road's revival. David Brown from the Radio Times noted that the show's cancellation gave Waterloo Road "full round of the school playground".

=== Ratings ===
Brown (Radio Times) observed that overnight ratings for the series had been poor. He had been concerned that younger audiences - who he felt would benefit most from watching - would miss the series through its airing on primetime television and the BBC iPlayer. However, he learnt and then noted that young audiences had reached the revival through video social media platform TikTok.

The series did not rate highly in the official 7-day viewership ratings published by the Broadcasters' Audience Research Board. None of the broadcast episodes reached the top 50 most-watched programmes of the week. Despite the low viewership figures for the broadcasts of each episode, the show performed well on the BBC iPlayer through its box set viewing. A BBC press release deemed the series "especially popular with younger viewers" and noted that as of April 2023, it was the BBC's second biggest drama title with people aged between 16 and 34, behind Happy Valley.

=== Critical response ===
Professional ratings
Review scores
Source	Rating
The Guardian	2/5 stars
The Telegraph	3/5 stars
The Times	3/5 stars
York Vision	2/5 stars

Jack Seale from The Guardian gave the opening episode a 2/5 star review, dubbing it "a lesson in how not to revive a TV show". He felt it was obvious that writers wanted to explore "social and political talking points" and thought it was not done in a "subtle" manner. Seale pointed out that this applies to both the leading story of the school's renaming and the story of a homeless student who has "fallen through the new cracks in society". He thought that the "attempts to crowbar heavy social issues into a soapy setting are jarring", especially in contrast to the more natural scenes of characters such as Donte and Chloe.

The series received a 3-star review from Poppie Platt of The Telegraph, criticising the use of "problematic, woke" language and the show's large main cast, which she felt left themes underdeveloped. She praised Danny's homelessness story for spotlighting that "circumstance often trumps ambition", and Kelly Jo's behavioural issues. Platt enjoyed the links to the original series, calling "gobby" Janeece's return straight from a nightclub her highlight. In the conclusion of her review, Platt opined that Waterloo Road presented a chance to raise awareness of issues faced by schools and young people, but wished, "If only they could do it with fewer cloying buzzwords."

The Times' James Jackson awarded the revival 3 stars in his review; he summarised it as "an old-school revival that could do better". He thought the series, which he noted was heavily promoted, "systematically challenged" his belief in comprehensive schools. Jackson opined that it tried to make Grange Hill look like Malory Towers. He found the changes in the school's name confusing.

In a review of the opening episode, Marti Stelling of York Vision awarded 2 out of 5 stars, calling it a lesson in "how to ruin a revival". She did not like the decision to set the revival at a new school, and found it unrealistic for the school to be renamed Waterloo Road. Additionally, the reviewer criticised the writing of the episode, describing Danny's homelessness story as "so poorly written that I don't think [it is] worth mentioning". Stelling was critical of the decision to kill Chlo off, opining that she would have been better suited to a role in the revival focusing on her beginning a job at the school. She also likened the plot to a story from Ackley Bridge, where lead character Missy Booth (Poppy Lee Friar) was killed off suddenly, remarking that it is "almost identical".

Kia-Elise Green from i newspaper defended the show against negative reviews, opining that it was "fulfilling its duty of tackling social and political talking points, that have often fallen through the cracks, in an accessible way". She believed that the revival created "a post-Covid reality check", exploring topical issues in a "raw and emotive" manner. Despite writing a positive review for the revival, Green acknowledged that some of the drama's plots were "too dramatic for a school setting".

David Brown of the Radio Times produced weekly reviews for the series, which featured in the day's television highlights section of the magazine. In his review of the opening episode, he noted that Kim was "as compassionate with her students as ever", and quipped that he felt "decrepit" seeing Donte and Chlo with a child in secondary education. His second episode review established that the revival is more "grounded" than its predecessor, with issue-based stories "being taken by the scruff of the neck and put up there on screen". Brown's review of episode three praised the exploration of Donte's grief and the Walters family's money struggles. He liked seeing Donte attending a grief group in episode 4. Reviewing episode 6, Brown highlighted the realism of male students rating female students on a "hot-or-not list". In his review of the final episode, Brown wrote of the parallels between the series opener and closer, particularly how it ends with a silent protest. He concluded the review wishing for another series, writing, "it'd be a shame if it closed its doors again so soon".

Digital Spy's Sophie Dainty opined that the show returned "with a bang". Her colleague, Dan Seddon, praised the inclusion of "I Predict a Riot" by the Kaiser Chiefs in the opening episode; the song had featured in the first episode of the original series. He dubbed the song's inclusion a "neat detail" and "a throwback to the original series". What's on TV included episodes 1, 2, 5 and 7 in their television "picks of the day" for each respective week. Writing for the Radio Times, Eleanor Noyce labelled the revival "a contemporary take on the original" and praised its ability to create "a sizeable dollop of nostalgia for its long-time fans". Lindsay (Metro) praised the performances of the Charles family and highlighted, "the chemistry between Katie and Adam Thomas, who plays Donte, was very much still there." Reflecting on the entire series, his colleague Sue Haasler later wrote, "Whether you waited patiently for episodes to air on a Tuesday evening or binge-watched them the minute they dropped on BBC iPlayer, the revival of Waterloo Road to our TV screens this year was a massive hit." Of the series' tone, Inside Soap's Alice Penwill wrote, "The first few episodes may have been full of heartbreak for the Charles family, but they've also had some great comedic moments in the corridors." Harriet Mitchell, writing for Digital Spy, noted that "things took an unexpected turn on tonight's (February 7) episode of Waterloo Road" with the kiss between Preston and Kai. She also opined that the final episode "[paved] the way for an exciting next series of the soap".

Chlo's death received a mainly critical response. The Tab's Hannah Van De Peer found the decision to kill Chlo off "so sudden" and "random", believing it to be more so than the death of Denzil Kelly (Reece Douglas) in series 7. She opined that fans of Chlo and Donte had been "a bit cheated of seeing them live a long life together", having watched them grow up and marry in the original series. Lindsay (Metro) echoed this, writing that "fans had the rug well and truly pulled from under their feet" when Chlo was killed-off, considering "one of the biggest points of excitement" regarding the show's revival was Chlo and Donte's return. His colleague, Calli Kitson, found it to be "unexpected" and thought it had "shocked us all". Dainty (Digital Spy) thought that Chlo's death would leave the show's "long-term fans devastated". Phoebe Jobling of Manchester Evening News called the scenes where Donte is informed about Chlo's death "emotional" and "heartbreaking". Her colleague, Jessica Sansome, described it as "a shock ending" to the opening episode. Following her character's death, Griffiths received positive messages from fans, which made her feel "incredibly touched". Brown (Radio Times) called the character's death "an attention-grabbing move", but felt it was justified by the exploration of Donte's grief, which he believed writers had "done a grand job" portraying.

The opening episode received a mixed response from viewers on social media. Niamh Shackleton from OK! magazine observed that some criticised it for being "woke", while others defended it and stated that Waterloo Road has "always tackled relevant issues". Van De Peer (The Tab) observed that viewer reception to Chlo's death was poor, writing, "It's probably an understatement to say the fan reaction hasn't been superb." Kitson (Metro) also found this, noting that viewers were "horrified" and "left devastated" by the death of "such a beloved character so early on". Actor Ryan Thomas praised the return of the show and noted, "It's beyond beautiful, so well shot".

==== Disability representation ====
The representation of disability in the series was praised by Charli Clement, writing for Digital Spy. They recognised that the original series lacked in this representation, while it was a strength of the revival, particularly through the exploration of ADHD using the character of Kelly Jo, which she labelled "very relatable". Clement applauded the choice of character for this story, noting that women and women of colour were underrepresented in the media and less likely to receive a diagnosis, so the story opened up challenge for stereotypes. They commended the "subtle" representations of ADHD - such as using sensory toys and chewing bag handles - which she believed were uncommon in mainstream television. In terms of story progression, the reviewer liked that the audience had to "rework how they view her" with fresh understanding of an ADHD diagnosis. In the piece, Clement also criticised some language used to describe other characters with neurodivergent conditions, including describing Coral - who has obsessive–compulsive disorder (OCD) - as a "clean freak". She also pointed out that writers needed to be careful with how they progress the story and suggested exploring how Kelly Jo copes without a formal diagnosis, the support from her friends and the differing needs of people with ADHD.

Noyce (Radio Times) commended Kelly Jo's story, deeming it "a particular standout" of the revival series. She liked the decision to play against the stereotype and explore ADHD through a female character who is "outwardly angry". She added that the story served as "a lesson for educators" on how to support young people through an ADHD diagnosis. In addition to defying stereotypes, Noyce hoped the story would help those with ADHD to feel "empowered and seen". Concluding their piece on the story, Noyce wrote: "By choosing to explore the subject in a sensitive, informed way, Waterloo Road is banging the drum for ADHD diversity representation on screen, demanding better from those who continue to peddle damaging myths, and calling on teachers and authority figures to educate themselves and offer a vital helping hand to those who need one." Noyce's colleague, David Brown, noticed that the revival series placed mental and physical health on "equal footing", something which was not evident in the original series.

The story was praised by special needs organisations for bringing representation to mainstream television. Hester Grainger, the co-founder of Perfectly Autistic, opined that a more subtle portrayal of ADHD created "good representation" of the condition. Chrissa Wadlow, Sunshine Support founder, commended the representation of a mixed-race female character with ADHD in mainstream media. She was a fan of Forde and said, "she's empathetic and her stature is spot-on. She's a terrific actor." Wadlow predicted that Kelly Jo's mother may also have ADHD and was being "overlooked". Wadlow also criticised some aspects of the story: the "tiresome" box-ticking of ADHD symptoms and the lack of support for someone with ADHD, which she believed emphasised "the need for better understanding".
