= List of Our Girl episodes =

Our Girl is a British television military drama series, written and created by Tony Grounds, which follows the lives of those in the British Army. The show's feature-length pilot episode was first broadcast on BBC One on 24 March 2013. Following the episode, a series was commissioned. The show's first series consisted of five episodes and aired between 21 September and 19 October 2014. The second series consisted of five episodes that aired from 7 September to 5 October 2016.

Shortly before series 2 ended, Our Girl was renewed for a third series. Series 3 consisted of 12 episodes that were split into two units: the first consisting of four episodes that aired from 10 to 21 October 2017, and the second consisting of the remaining eight airing from 5 June to 24 July 2018. The fourth series, which was announced in 2019, consisted of six episodes airing from 24 March to 28 April 2020. In August 2020, after Michelle Keegan departed from the series, it was announced that Our Girl would not be renewed for a fifth series.

== Series overview ==
Series	Episodes		Originally released		Average UK viewers (millions)
Series	Episodes		First released	Last released	Average UK viewers (millions)
Pilot			24 March 2013		6.31
1	5		21 September 2014	19 October 2014	5.24
2	5		7 September 2016	5 October 2016	6.07
3	12	4	10 October 2017	31 October 2017	5.11
3	12	8	5 June 2018	24 July 2018	5.11
4	6		24 March 2020	28 April 2020	4.61

== Episodes ==
=== Pilot (2013) ===
Title	Directed by	Written by	Original release date	UK viewers (millions)
"Pilot"	David Drury	Tony Grounds	24 March 2013	6.31

=== Series 1 (2014) ===
No. overall	No. in series	Title	Directed by	Written by	Original release date	UK viewers (millions)
1	1	"Time"	Anthony Philipson	Tony Grounds	21 September 2014	5.22
2	2	"Feelings"	Anthony Philipson	Tony Grounds	28 September 2014	4.90
3	3	"Changes"	Richard Senior	Tony Grounds	5 October 2014	4.81
4	4	"Love"	Richard Senior	Tony Grounds	12 October 2014	5.28
5	5	"Heroes"	Anthony Philipson	Tony Grounds	19 October 2014	4.92

=== Series 2 (2016) ===
No. overall	No. in series	Title	Directed by	Written by	Original release date	UK viewers (millions)
6	1	"Lane"	Jan Matthys	Tony Grounds	7 September 2016	6.23
7	2	"Going On"	Jan Matthys	Tony Grounds	14 September 2016	6.23
8	3	"Look Now"	Jan Matthys	Tony Grounds	21 September 2016	6.06
9	4	"Ready"	Luke Snellin	Tony Grounds	28 September 2016	5.79
10	5	"Afterwards"	Luke Snellin	Tony Grounds	5 October 2016	6.03

=== Series 3 (2017–2018) ===
No. overall	No. in series	Title	Directed by	Written by	Original release date	UK viewers (millions)
Part 1
11	1	"Nepal Tour: Episode 1"	Tim Fywell	Tony Grounds	10 October 2017	6.30
12	2	"Nepal Tour: Episode 2"	Tim Fywell	Tony Grounds	17 October 2017	5.73
13	3	"Nepal Tour: Episode 3"	Jon Wright	Amy Roberts & Loren Mclaughlan	24 October 2017	5.51
14	4	"Nepal Tour: Episode 4"	Jon Wright	Tony Grounds	31 October 2017	5.36
Part 2
15	5	"Nigeria Tour: Episode 1"	Rob Evans	Tony Grounds	5 June 2018	5.00
16	6	"Nigeria Tour: Episode 2"	Rob Evans	Tony Grounds	12 June 2018	4.73
17	7	"Belize Tour: Episode 1"	Noreen Kershaw	Tony Grounds	19 June 2018	5.32
18	8	"Belize Tour: Episode 2"	Noreen Kershaw	Tony Grounds	26 June 2018	5.42
19	9	"Bangladesh Tour: Episode 1"	Brian Grant	Tony Grounds	4 July 2018 (Note: This episode was originally due for broadcast on 3 July, but was moved due to coverage of the 2018 FIFA World Cup.)	4.18
20	10	"Bangladesh Tour: Episode 2"	Brian Grant	Kelly Jones	17 July 2018 (Note: This episode was originally due for broadcast on 10 July, but was originally moved to 13 July due to coverage of the 2018 FIFA World Cup. However, due to overrunning coverage of Wimbledon 2018, broadcast was again moved to 17 July.)	4.65
21	11	"Bangladesh Tour: Episode 3"	Sarah O'Gorman	Tony Grounds	23 July 2018 (Note: This episode was originally due for broadcast on 17 July, but was moved due to the delayed broadcast of Episode 10.)	4.47
22	12	"Bangladesh Tour: Episode 4"	Sarah O'Gorman	Tony Grounds	24 July 2018	4.67

=== Series 4 (2020) ===
No. overall	No. in series	Title	Directed by	Written by	Original release date	UK viewers (millions)
23	1	"Episode 1"	Anthony Philipson	Tony Grounds	24 March 2020	5.25
24	2	"Episode 2"	Anthony Philipson	Tony Grounds	31 March 2020	4.69
25	3	"Episode 3"	Anthony Philipson	Tony Grounds	7 April 2020	4.63
26	4	"Episode 4"	Claire Winyard	Tony Grounds	14 April 2020	4.35
27	5	"Episode 5"	Claire Winyard	Matt Evans	21 April 2020	4.29
28	6	"Episode 6"	Claire Winyard	Tony Grounds	28 April 2020	4.49
