= Elvis Harte =

Fictional character from Our Girl

- Our Girl character
- First appearance: "Lane"; 7 September 2016
- Last appearance: "Nepal Tour: Episode 4"; 31 October 2017
- Created by: Tony Grounds
- Portrayed by: Luke Pasqualino

In-universe information
- Occupation: Special forces captain
- Affiliation: British Army
- Significant other: Georgie Lane (fiancée)
- Children: Laura (daughter)

Elvis Harte is a fictional character from the BBC military drama Our Girl, played by Luke Pasqualino. He first appeared in the first episode of the second series, broadcast on 7 September 2016. The character was introduced as a captain in the British special forces and the ex-fiancé of protagonist Georgie Lane (Michelle Keegan). Elvis's storylines in the series included his friendship with 2-Section's commanding officer Captain James (Ben Aldridge), struggling with his lingering feelings for Georgie, and his eventual death in battle. After his on-screen death, Elvis makes several appearances throughout the fourth series as a hallucination.

Elvis was described as cheeky, cocky, confident, and driven after Pasqualino's casting was announced in March 2016. As he previously starred in The Musketeers, the actor was used to the heavy uniforms and intense heat that came with filming in South Africa. When the third series was commissioned, Pasqualino's commitments to a role in Snatch meant he had to leave Our Girl after four episodes. Pasqualino and series creator Tony Grounds decided that Elvis's death was the best route for the development of the series, despite the actor hoping Elvis's character wouldn't be forgotten by fans. The character and his relationship with Georgie were generally well-received, and his eventual demise was met with mournful reactions from viewers.

== Development ==
In March 2016, it was announced that actor Luke Pasqualino would join Our Girl for its second series. He earned the role of special forces commander Elvis, a new main character for the series. Elvis was billed by the BBC as a "cheeky chappy Londoner" who is "fearless, impulsive, self-confident, determined and cool under pressure". Pasqualino was drawn to the role as he was attracted to Elvis's character and the themes of the series. To prepare for the role, Pasqualino watched documentaries about life in the special forces. He commented that he did so to "get into the heads" of SAS members, a task which he admittedly found difficult as they "never show much emotion". Pasqualino described Elvis as a man with "a lot of bravado, a lot of cheekiness and a lot of cockiness about him", but noted "at the end of the day, he gets his end goal finished" and considered his character a "maverick". The actor admitted he wasn't sure why Elvis joined the special forces, but suggested it was because "he knows how good he is". He explained that while Elvis is someone who "wants to make the world a better place", he likes to do so "on his own terms" and prioritises the aims and objectives of his work. In an interview with What's on TV, Pasqualino billed Elvis as an "alpha male" and, as a special forces commander, "slightly more hardened" than the characters of 2-Section.

Pasqualino did not have much time to prepare to play Elvis as he finished a job in Sri Lanka mere hours before Our Girl began preparing its actors physically. Speaking of boot camp training for the series, the actor compared it to the preparation he underwent to play D'Artagnan in The Musketeers, as both included many drills, handling of weapons, and nonverbal hand signals. This previous role also helped when it came to filming, as Pasqualino had become used to wearing heavy costumes in intense heat. However, he admitted that due to the heightened physicality of Our Girl, the heat eventually began to take a toll. He noted a difference being the type of combat, as there was less hand-to-hand combat involved in Our Girl. He concluded: "It wasn't easier or harder, just different". Pasqualino admitted that he enjoyed handling guns on set, commenting that "you feel like a lad" when doing so. Pasqualino also voiced delight in filming in Cape Town, South Africa, recounting that the actors were often allowed to explore and that he found the city beautiful. The actor teased that he performed many action scenes, which he enjoyed filming as, in his words, they "get your adrenaline pumping". Pasqualino stated the role gave him a "heightened respect" for those in the army.

In the series, Elvis was part of a love triangle story with Georgie and her new fiancé Jamie. Commenting on his character's relationship with Georgie, Pasqualino explained that it started with the two being "madly [...] in love with each other", but quickly ended after an event on their wedding day. Having previously broken Georgie's heart, Elvis was said to be "pretty determined to make amends" and win her affection back. When asked about his character's connection to Georgie, Pasqualino stated his character found her "absolutely beautiful" and enjoyed the challenge of being in a romantic relationship with her as she doesn't "fall at his feet". His character's soft spot for Georgie prompted Pasqualino to label her as Elvis's weakness. After it was announced that Our Girl had been greenlit for a third series and Pasqualino would reprise his role as Elvis, the actor predicted that audiences would be "surprised" with the state of Elvis and Georgie's relationship in the series. Keegan had previously expressed that Georgie would "still [believe] they can't be together" when Pasqualino added that Elvis would want to "reconcile" with her as he was "head over heels in love" with her.

Pasqualino's commitments to his role as Albert Hill on Snatch dictated that Elvis be written out of Our Girl after four episodes of series three. Pasqualino helped series creator Tony Grounds come up with potential reasons for Elvis's departure, with the actor being the one to suggest his character be killed off in dramatic fashion before Grounds accepted the idea. After deciding Elvis would be killed, the two decided that for his demise to have an emotional punch, Elvis would propose to Georgie shortly beforehand. Grounds came to the decision that Elvis would die in battle, a fate which he felt was a fitting end to the character as "he's quite close to death all the time" due to his job. He deemed other potential explanations for Elvis's absence as "daft", and felt his death was necessary as maintaining the drama of the show would not have been possible if Elvis and Georgie had lived happily ever after and didn't want the relationship's narrative to become repetitive. Pasqualino admitted he was shocked to learn how Elvis would die, but supported the decision, arguing "it needed to be quite horrific for it to land". Pasqualino expressed hopes that Elvis wouldn't be forgotten by fans after his death.

== Storylines ==
Elvis, a member of the special forces, leaves Georgie Lane (Michelle Keegan) on their wedding day. Two years later, his old friend Captain James (Ben Aldridge) requests help from the special forces to storm a Kenyan Al-Shabaab base after Georgie is abducted by a faction of the group. Elvis leads the operation, which Captain James can tell is personally motivated, as Elvis harbours feelings for her. The special forces rescue Georgie, who is not happy to see Elvis again and is now engaged to a man named Jamie (Royce Pierreson). They later bomb the holding ground Georgie was kept in. After the tour concludes, Elvis tearfully tells Georgie that the reason why he left her was because a woman named Debbie told him he had a daughter, and Elvis chose to be a part of his child's life over a future with her. They sleep together on their last night before heading back to the UK.

Once back, Elvis calls Georgie to a meeting in Whitehall with the Special Branch as it has been suggested that one of Georgie's captors, a radical convert named Abu (Michael James), escaped the air strike in Kenya and has re-entered the UK. As Georgie has seen him in what she believed to be paranoid hallucinations, they decide to check CCTV in areas where she saw him. Elvis and his unit are called to help when intel indicates that Abu and his associates are to perform a series of terrorist attacks across Manchester. They incapacitate all of the attackers, except Abu. On Georgie's wedding day, Captain James tells Elvis not to get involved. However, Elvis worries that Abu will target Georgie's wedding ceremony, so tries to stop her from getting married. Georgie puts together that Abu has actually been planning to target his ex-girlfriend Saira's (Dinita Gohil) university graduation as revenge for breaking up with him. Georgie and Elvis manage to stop Abu from committing a suicide attack on the building and Abu is shot dead by the special forces.

Sometime later, special forces are notified of a lead to a Taliban commander named Aban Omar, with 2-Section, Georgie's team, set to support them on a mission through Afghanistan to extract him from a compound. He reunites with Captain James and Georgie in Kathmandu, Nepal. As Elvis once had a one-night stand with a new recruit, Maisie Richards (Shalom Brune-Franklin), Georgie insists that she has moved on from him. Elvis is further dismayed to hear that she has been flirting with a Nepalese man named Milan Dhakal (Rudi Dharmalingam). Elvis pleads with Georgie to give the relationship another shot as he has struggled thinking of her with another man, but Georgie shoots down his offer. After the mission fails and many are injured, Elvis supports a defeated Captain James and heartbroken Georgie. Once back, he declares that he has changed, winning back Georgie's affections. Before they set out on one final mission, Elvis proposes, and Georgie accepts. However, the mission ends tragically as Elvis is killed in an explosion set off by Omar. Elvis dies in Georgie's arms.

== Reception ==
Following the announcement that Keegan would return for Our Girl's third series, Katie Fitzpatrick of Manchester Evening News noted viewers were "desperate" for Pasqualino to return alongside her, as many Twitter users were frustrated that their characters did not become a couple at the end of series two. Fitzpatrick also described Elvis as "handsome" and "hunky" upon his eventual return, adding that it sent viewers "into a meltdown". Aime Grant Cumberbatch of The Standard reported fans praising Elvis and Georgie's "intense" chemistry. Morgan Jeffery of Digital Spy noted that fans were "left heartbroken" by Elvis's death, calling it "explosive" and a "shock". Jeffery's colleague, Justin Harp, showcased both angry and devastated Twitter reactions from many viewers, with some promising to stop watching after the death. Cumberbatch (The Standard) also reported similar viewer responses, describing the death, alongside their engagement mere minutes beforehand, as a "rollercoaster" for viewers. Susanna Lazarus of Radio Times deemed Elvis a "fan favourite" and predicted fans would "need a moment" to process the death. In 2020, her colleague, Laura Denby, commented that Elvis had "remained at the heart of fan conversation" and called his relationship with Georgie "hugely popular", leading to speculations that Elvis had somehow survived the ordeal.
