= Joe Coffey =

Joe Coffey may refer to:

- Joe Coffey (wrestler) (born 1988), Scottish professional wrestler
- Joe Coffey (active 1911), member of the Texas House of Representatives who preceded James P. Buchanan
- Joe Coffey, a character in American TV police drama series Hill Street Blues
- Jo Coffey (born 1976), English actress
- Joseph Coffey, police investigator in the Aniello Dellacroce mafia case

== See also ==
- Tommy Joe Coffey (born 1936), Canadian Football League wide receiver and place kicker
