= Katherine Pearce =

English actress (born 1990)

- Born: Katherine Anne Pearce; August 1990 (age 36); Newton-le-Willows, Merseyside, England
- Education: Royal Welsh College of Music & Drama
- Occupation: Actress
- Years active: 2012–present
- Television: Young Hyacinth; Coronation Street; Waterloo Road

Katherine Anne Pearce (born August 1990) is an English actress, known for her work in television and film, as well as on stage. Her television roles include Lolly in the ITV soap opera Coronation Street and Amy Spratt in the BBC drama series Waterloo Road. Her stage credits include Woyzeck, A Streetcar Named Desire and King John, The Whip and A Midsummer Night's Dream.

== Life and career ==
Katherine Anne Pearce was born in August 1990 in Newton-le-Willows, Merseyside. She had appeared in productions of Cats and Chicago as a teenager as part of her local dramatic society, NADOS.

She trained at Royal Welsh College of Music & Drama, graduating in 2012. Her first credited role was in the BBC Radio 4 drama The Righteous Sisters as Ismay Brown. In 2013, She subsequently went on to make her stage debut in Port at the Royal National Theatre by Simon Stephens. She also appeared in Our Pals at the Royal Exchange, Manchester, before being chosen to be part of the groundbreaking Secret Theatre collective at the Lyric Theatre, Hammersmith. The collective created several shows including adaptations (Woyzeck, A Streetcar Named Desire), staged new writing (Chamber Piece, Glitterland, A Stab In The Dark), as well as devising the critically acclaimed Series of Increasingly Impossible Acts. The same year, Pearce made her television debut as Katy in the pilot of the BBC military drama Our Girl. She also played Freya in the podcast series The Confessions of Dorian Gray.

In 2016, Pearce appeared as Daisy in Young Hyacinth, a one-off special set prior to the events of the 1990s sitcom Keeping Up Appearances. She also appeared as Gertie Coomer in the play Husbands and Sons which toured the Royal National Theatre and Royal Exchange, Manchester. In 2017, Pearce appeared as Emily Stone in the BBC drama Three Girls, before making her film debut appearing in My Cousin Rachel, as well as appearing in the films The Last Photograph and England is Mine respectively, as well as starring in the stage plays Low Level Panic and The Last Ballad of Lillian Bilocca. In 2018, she portrayed Charlene in an episode of the ITV drama Vera and appeared as Sonia in the comedy series Girlfriends. She was also part of the 2018 Paines Plough Roundabout Season, starring in three new plays: Sticks and Stones by Vinay Patel, How to Spot an Alien by Georgia Christou and Island Town by Simon Longman, for which she won The Stage Edinburgh Award at the Edinburgh Festival Fringe in 2018. She was also the voice of Fabia in the audio drama Cicero.

In 2019, Pearce joined the cast of the ITV soap opera Coronation Street as Lolly, a school friend of Kate Connor's (Faye Brookes). Her character becomes involved in the planning of Kate's wedding to Rana Habeeb (Bhavna Limbachia) and damages the latter's wedding dress, which results in Rana being inside in a fictional factory at the time of the roof collapse, ultimately causing her death. She also provided the voice of Alice Pritchard in the audio drama The War Master. That same year, Pearce appeared as Cardinal Pandulph in King John and Juliet Gilkes-Romero's play The Whip as Horatia Poskitt at the Royal Shakespeare Company Swan Theatre, Stratford-upon-Avon. The run was cut short due to the COVID-19 pandemic.

In 2022, she appeared in the BBC drama series Rules of the Game as Carys Jenkins. In 2023, Pearce joined the cast of the revival series of the BBC school drama Waterloo Road as Amy Spratt, an early career teacher in English and drama. She appeared until the fifteenth series when her character decides to resign. Following her exit from the show in 2024, Pearce played Puck in A Midsummer Night's Dream at the Barbican Theatre.

As of May 2025, she is due to play Mistress Ford in a new version of The Merry Wives of Windsor at Shakespeare's Globe, directed by Sean Holmes.

== Filmography ==
=== Television and film ===
Year	Title	Role	Notes	Ref.
2013	Our Girl	Katy	Episode: "Pilot"	
2016	Young Hyacinth	Daisy	Television special	
2017	Three Girls	Emily Stone	Recurring role	
2017	My Cousin Rachel	Belinda Pascoe	Film role	
2017	The Last Photograph	Woman #1	Film role	
2017	England is Mine	Anji Hardie	Film role	
2018	Vera	Charlene	Episode: "Black Ice"	
2018	Girlfriends	Sonia	2 episodes	
2019	Coronation Street	Lolly	Recurring role	
2021	Royal Shakespeare Company: King John	Cardinal Pandulph	Film role	
2022	Rules of the Game	Carys Jenkins	Regular role	
2023–2025	Waterloo Road	Amy Spratt	Regular role	

=== Audio ===
Year	Title	Role	Notes	Ref.
2012	The Righteous Sisters	Ismay Brown	Radio drama; 2 episodes	
2013	The Confessions of Dorian Gray	Freya	Podcast series; 2 episodes	
2018	Cicero	Fabia	Audio drama; 2 episodes	
2019	The War Master	Alice Pritchard	Audio drama; 2 episodes	

== Stage ==
Year	Title	Role	Venue	Ref.
2013	Port	Heather	Royal National Theatre	
2013	Our Pals	Heather	Royal Exchange, Manchester	
2013	Woyzeck	Marie	Lyric Theatre	
2013	A Streetcar Named Desire	Eunice	Lyric Theatre	
2013	Chamber Piece	Amy	Lyric Theatre	
2014	Glitterland	Victoria	Lyric Theatre	
2014–2015	A Series of Increasingly Impossible Acts	Protagonist / Antagonist	Lyric Theatre	
2015	A Stab in the Dark	Captain De'Ath	Lyric Theatre	
2016	Husbands and Sons	Gertie Coomer	Royal National Theatre; Royal Exchange, Manchester	
2017	Low Level Panic	Jo	Orange Tree Theatre	
2017	The Last Ballad of Lillian Bilocca	Yvonne / Ensemble	Hull Truck Theatre	
2018	Roundabout Season	Various	Paines Plough	
2019	King John	Cardinal Pandulph	Swan Theatre, Stratford-upon-Avon	
2020	The Whip	Horatia Poskitt	Swan Theatre	
2023	No Pay? No Way!	Margherita	Royal Exchange	
2024–2025	A Midsummer Night's Dream	Puck	Barbican Theatre	
