= List of Emmerdale characters introduced in 1997 =

The following is a list of characters that first appeared in the British soap opera Emmerdale in 1997, by order of first appearance.

== Lyn Hutchinson ==
Lyn Hutchinson
- Emmerdale character
- Portrayed by: Sally Walsh
- Duration: 1997–2000
- First appearance: 8 January 1997
- Last appearance: 16 February 2000
- Introduced by: Mervyn Watson
In-universe information
- Occupation: Student
- Mother: Heather Hutchinson
- Sisters: Kirsty Hutchinson
- Grandfathers: Jed Outhwaite

Lyn Hutchinson, played by Sally Walsh, made her first appearance on 8 January 1997. Walsh said receiving the role of Lyn was "like coming home in a way" because she had previously worked with Steve Halliwell (Zak Dingle) and Paul Fox (Will Cairns). Louise Oswald of The People dubbed Lyn and Kelly Windsor (Adele Silva) Emmerdale's "terrible twosome" and compared them to Coronation Street's Battersby sisters. Oswald also stated, "Kelly and Lyn are the original sweet-faced kids with a frightening wild streak. Parents watching the show see what they get up to and start wondering what their own daughters are doing. And young soap fans love to see them up to the sort of tricks they wouldn't dare try themselves." Walsh's younger sister Amy Walsh joined the cast of Emmerdale in 2014 as Tracy Shankley.

Lyn taunts Kelly Windsor about her relationship with teacher Tom Bainbridge (Jeremy Turner-Welch), causing the two girls to fight and forcing Tom to separate them. Despite this, Lyn and Kelly later become friends. Lyn bullies Emma Cairns (Rebecca Loudonsack) about her teenage pregnancy. She dates Roy Glover (Nicky Evans) and Marlon Dingle (Mark Charnock), whom she then cheats on with Scott Windsor (Ben Freeman). Lyn breaks up with Marlon on his 25th birthday. Lyn and Scott start a relationship, which ends when she discovers Scott has been having an affair with Kelly, who is his stepsister. Disgusted by this, Lyn ends her relationship with Scott and leaves the village.

== Anne Cullen ==
Anne Cullen
- Emmerdale character
- Portrayed by: Heather Peace
- First appearance: 14 January 1997
- Last appearance: 18 June 1997
- Introduced by: Mervyn Watson
In-universe information
- Occupation: Primary school teacher

Anne Cullen, portrayed by Heather Peace, was a primary school teacher at Hotten County where she taught Robert Sugden (Christopher Smith), Andy Hopwood (Kelvin Fletcher) and Donna Windsor (Sophie Jeffrey). On her first appearance on 14 January 1997, she was credited as Sally Cullen.

In April 1997, when Donna and Andy had a fight, she intervened and took him to the headteacher, only for Andy to lash out at her. After he returned from temporary exclusion, Andy began to cause trouble for Cullen by breaking the class computer in a rage. This incident caused many parents, including Donna's mother, Viv Windsor (Deena Payne) to campaign for Andy to be removed from the school. However, despite his appalling behaviour, Cullen stood up for Andy and his right to have an education.

== Barry Clegg ==
Barry Clegg
- Emmerdale character
- Portrayed by: Bernard Wrigley
- Duration: 1997–1998
- First appearance: 30 January 1997
- Last appearance: 27 January 1998
- Introduced by: Mervyn Watson
In-universe information
- Mother: Granny Clegg
- Wife: Lisa Clegg (1977-1997)

Barry Clegg, played by Bernard Wrigley, made his first appearance on 30 January 1997. Barry was introduced as the estranged husband of Lisa Clegg (Jane Cox). Despite the couple being separated, Barry lived in an out building on the same farm as Lisa. He was "an irritation" to Zak Dingle (Steve Halliwell), who was in love with Lisa.

Barry is an eccentric, who builds a space rocket. Marlon (Mark Charnock) and Butch Dingle (Paul Loughran) accidentally cause it to launch early while fighting, and it enters the Dingle's barn and explodes. Barry tries to stop Lisa from marrying Albert Dingle (Bobby Knutt), but is forcibly ejected from the church, leading to Albert's brother Zak to declare his feelings for Lisa. Months later, Barry competes against Zak for a busking pitch and he shows off his pedal powered microwave on a television show filmed in the village. Barry returns with a wedding present for Zak and Lisa's wedding. Although, they tell him he cannot come to the service, he attends Zak's stag night and lends him some money for the alcohol for the reception.

John Millar of the Daily Record branded Barry's space travel ambitions as "a laugh".

== Dee Pollard ==
Dee Pollard
- Emmerdale character
- Portrayed by: Claudia Malkovich
- Duration: 1997–1998
- First appearance: 13 February 1997
- Last appearance: 7 April 1998
- Introduced by: Mervyn Watson
In-universe information
- Occupation: Student
- Husband: Eric Pollard (1997–2001)

Dee Pollard (née de La Cruz) was the former wife of Eric Pollard and she appeared from February 1997 until April 1998.

Eric Pollard flew to the Far East looking for love and found it with Filipino student Dee de la Cruz in a Manila restaurant. His initial interest was sex, but two weeks later he proposed and the couple made plans for Dee to follow Eric back to Britain. When she arrived in 1997, dressed in a miniskirt and skimpy coat, and wearing high-heels, the locals in Emmerdale were curious. They were shocked when she announced that she was Eric's fiancée. But the unlikely relationship continued and Dee became Mrs Pollard in a May register office wedding. Dee left Emmerdale in April 1998 after discovering that her mother had died and Eric had kept this hidden from her. Dee returned home to the Philippines. Her marriage with Eric was annulled in 2001.

== Will Cairns ==
Will Cairns
- Emmerdale character
- Portrayed by: Paul Fox
- Duration: 1997–1999
- First appearance: 27 February 1997
- Last appearance: 27 January 1999
- Introduced by: Mervyn Watson
In-universe information
- Father: Tony Cairns
- Mother: Becky Cairns
- Sisters: Charlie Cairns; Emma Cairns
- Nieces: Geri Cairns

William "Will" Cairns arrived in Emmerdale in February 1997 with his family as the second child and only son of Tony and Becky Cairns. One of his main storylines was when he was kidnapped by, Fiona Mallender, the daughter of a soldier his father had served with who wanted to avenge her father's death on a training exercise, which she blamed Tony for. Will left the village in January 1999, joining the rest of his family in Germany after his father was injured in a climbing accident.

== Emma Cairns ==
Emma Cairns
- Emmerdale character
- Portrayed by: Rebecca Loudonsack
- Duration: 1997–1998
- First appearance: 27 February 1997
- Last appearance: 26 August 1998
- Introduced by: Mervyn Watson
In-universe information
- Occupation: Student
- Father: Tony Cairns
- Mother: Becky Cairns
- Brothers: Will Cairns
- Sisters: Charlie Cairns
- Daughters: Geri Cairns

Emma Cairns arrived in Emmerdale in February 1997 with her family as the youngest child and daughter of Tony and Becky Cairns, heavily pregnant. She gave birth to her daughter Geri a month later. Her father Tony wanted her to have Geri adopted and Emma initially agreed. However, she changed her mind when she bonded with her baby daughter but this didn't last. Gradually, Becky found herself looking after Geri more and more and so Geri was put up for adoption after all.

The father was later revealed to be Greg Cox, the ex-boyfriend of her sister Charlie. This led to Charlie leaving, only a few months after arriving. Her parents left for Germany in April 1998, with Emma joining them in the Summer.

== Becky Cairns ==
Becky Cairns
- Emmerdale character
- Portrayed by: Sarah Neville
- Duration: 1997–1998
- First appearance: 27 February 1997
- Last appearance: 30 April 1998
- Introduced by: Mervyn Watson
In-universe information
- Husband: Tony Cairns
- Sons: Will Cairns
- Daughters: Charlie Cairns; Emma Cairns
- Granddaughters: Geri Cairns

Rebecca "Becky" Cairns arrived in Emmerdale, where she grew up when she was young, in February 1997 with her family. Becky had a lesbian fling with vet Zoe Tate. After her affair with Zoe was exposed, Becky left with her husband Tony for Germany in April 1998 in an attempt to patch up her marriage.

== Charlie Cairns ==
Charlie Cairns
- Emmerdale character
- Portrayed by: Sarah Graham
- First appearance: 27 February 1997
- Last appearance: 30 July 1997
- Introduced by: Mervyn Watson
In-universe information
- Father: Tony Cairns
- Mother: Becky Cairns
- Brothers: Will Cairns
- Sisters: Emma Cairns
- Nieces: Geri Cairns

Charlie Cairns arrived in Emmerdale in February 1997 with her family. She is the eldest of Tony and Becky Cairns' three children. When her younger sister Emma gave birth to a baby a month later, she was devastated to learn her boyfriend, Greg Cox, was the father and this led to her departure in July.

== Tony Cairns ==
Tony Cairns
- Emmerdale character
- Portrayed by: Edward Peel
- Duration: 1997–1998
- First appearance: 13 March 1997
- Last appearance: 22 April 1998
- Introduced by: Mervyn Watson
In-universe information
- Wife: Becky Cairns
- Sons: Will Cairns
- Daughters: Charlie Cairns; Emma Cairns
- Granddaughters: Geri Cairns

Anthony "Tony" Cairns arrived in Emmerdale in March 1997 following the rest of his family after retiring early from the army. When his youngest daughter Emma gave birth to a baby girl who she named Geri at the young age of 13, Tony wanted her to have Geri adopted, to which Emma initially went along with. However, she defied her father and changed her mind when she grew close to her baby daughter. Tony left with Becky for Germany in April 1998 after he is offered a new job.

== Geri Cairns ==
Geri Cairns
- Emmerdale character
- Portrayed by: Georgina Annett (1997); Anna Cunningham (1997)
- First appearance: 31 March 1997
- Last appearance: 18 November 1997
- Introduced by: Mervyn Watson
In-universe information
- Father: Greg Cox
- Mother: Emma Cairns
- Grandfathers: Tony Cairns
- Grandmothers: Becky Cairns
- Uncles: Will Cairns
- Aunts: Charlie Cairns

Geri Cairns was born to 13-year-old Emma Cairns, who was fathered by her sister Charlie Cairns' boyfriend, Greg Cox. Initially, Emma's father, Tony Cairns, advised her to give Geri up for adoption, which she originally agrees with, but changes her mind after she bonds with her. However, in August 1997 she does give Geri up for adoption. In November 1997, Geri's grandmother, Becky Cairns, goes to Geri's foster home to bring her home, but Emma insists that it was her decision and giving Geri up was best for both of them. After the revelation that Greg was the father of Geri, Charlie broke up with him and disowned Emma, leaving the village.

== Kirsty Hutchinson ==
Kirsty Hutchinson
- Emmerdale character
- Portrayed by: Anne Marie-Jowett
- Duration: 1997–1998
- First appearance: 15 May 1997
- Last appearance: 20 August 1998
- Introduced by: Mervyn Watson
In-universe information
- Occupation: Student
- Mother: Heather Hutchinson
- Sisters: Lyn Hutchinson
- Grandfathers: Jed Outhwaite

Kirsty Hutchinson is the younger sister of Lyn Hutchinson (Sally Walsh) and the daughter of Heather Hutchinson (Siobhan Finneran) and granddaughter of Jed Outhwaite (Tony Melody). She was also friends with Emma Cairns. After her mother quit her role as a barmaid at The Woolpack, she moved to Hotten with her.

== Dean Adlington ==
Dean Adlington
- Emmerdale character
- Portrayed by: Patrick Connolly
- Duration: 1997–1998
- First appearance: 15 May 1997
- Last appearance: 29 July 1998
- Introduced by: Mervyn Watson
In-universe information
- Occupation: Student
- Father: Ken Adlington
- Mother: Margaret Adlington

Ken Adlington, portrayed by Patrick Connolly, is the son of Ken and Margaret Adlington. He first appeared on 15 May 1997 and was a friend of Emma Cairns. In 1998, he and Lyn Hutchinson helped Tony Cairns with his outdoor activities course by stealing his van, by which his team were cheating. In May 1998, he played in the school rugby final and blamed Will Cairns when they lost as he arrived late after nursing a hangover.

== Greg Cox ==
Greg Cox
- Emmerdale character
- Portrayed by: Danny Seaward
- First appearance: 16 July 1997
- Last appearance: 24 July 1997
- Introduced by: Mervyn Watson
In-universe information
- Father: Luke Cox
- Mother: Janice Cox
- Daughters: Geri Cairns

Greg Cox was the boyfriend of Charlie Cairns, who fathered her sister Emma Cairns' daughter, Geri. When Charlie discovered this, she kneed him in the groin and broke up with him, leaving Emmerdale after. Geri was put up for adoption by Emma; therefore, it can be assumed that Greg has played no role in Geri's upbringing.

== Jo Steadman ==
Jo Steadman
- Emmerdale character
- Portrayed by: Julie Peasgood
- First appearance: 21 August 1997
- Last appearance: 29 October 1997

Jo Steadman was a biker and short-term girlfriend of Alan Turner. Jo wanted Alan to sell The Woolpack and travel with her to America. Alan told her that he had built his life in Emmerdale. He told Jo to live her dream and that he would wait for her. Jo never returned.

== Lulu Dingle ==
Lulu Dingle
- Emmerdale character
- Portrayed by: Dee Quemby
- Appears in: 10 September 1997
- Introduced by: Mervyn Watson
In-universe information
- Other relatives: Zak Dingle; Butch Dingle; Sam Dingle; Mandy Dingle; Albert Dingle; Marlon Dingle

Lulu Dingle was a relative of the Dingles, who arrived in Emmerdale for the ill-fated wedding of Albert Dingle (Bobby Knutt) and Lisa Clegg (Jane Cox). Before the wedding ceremony, she flirted with Ned Glover (Johnny Leeze), claiming she was psychic. She offered Alan Turner (Richard Thorp) a reading for a round of drinks, but he politely declined. It is unknown how Lulu is related to the other Dingles in Emmerdale and hasn't been referenced since her appearance.

== Doug Hamilton ==
Doug Hamilton
- Emmerdale character
- Portrayed by: Jay Benedict
- First appearance: 2 October 1997
- Last appearance: 23 December 1997
- Introduced by: Mervyn Watson
In-universe information
- Occupation: Businessman

Doug Hamilton, played by Jay Benedict, made his first appearance on 2 October 1997. Doug is a businessman from the United States, who puts in an offer for the golf course, while "wining and dining" Kathy Glover (Malandra Burrows). Kathy later learns Doug is married and their relationship ends.
