= Ken Horn =

British television producer

Ken Horn is a British television producer. He is the producer of ITV1's Heartbeat and its spin-off The Royal. He is co-creator of their sister show, The Royal Today.

== Biography ==
Ken Horn grew up in Leicester, where he attended Wyggeston Grammar School for Boys.

Horn has produced various shows for both ITV and BBC, including City Central, Merseybeat, working as a lighting cameraman, and directed shows such as We Are Seven, Heartbeat, Emmerdale, Brookside, Hollyoaks and The Grand. He also produced and directed a one-off drama for ITV about the sinking of the Marchionness.

In 2006, Horn produced The Street, a Jimmy McGovern drama for BBC One that went on to win a BAFTA and an International Emmy. In 2012, he produced the one-off drama Our Girl, starring Lacey Turner, for BBC One. More recently, in 2019 and 2021, Horn produced the fifth and sixth series of Line of Duty for BBC One.

He is the brother of the musician and record producer Trevor Horn, with whom he established Horn Brothers Pictures in 2011.

He now lives in Winwick, Cheshire with his family.
