= Our Girl =

British television military drama series (2013–2020)

- Title card (series 3–4)
- Genre: Military drama
- Created by: Tony Grounds
- Written by: Tony Grounds
- Directed by: David Drury; Anthony Philipson; Richard Senior; Jan Matthys; Luke Snellin; Tim Fywell; Jon Wright
- Opening theme: "War Rages On" – Alex Clare (Series 1); "Hear You Calling" – Birdy (Series 2); "Battlecry" – Jordan Mackampa (Series 3–4)
- Composer: Ben Foster
- Country of origin: United Kingdom
- Original language: English
- No. of series: 4
- No. of episodes: 28 (list of episodes)

Production
- Executive producers: John Yorke; Caroline Skinner
- Producers: Ken Horn; Eric Coulter
- Production locations: Hertfordshire; Camp Bastion; Army Training Centre, Pirbright; South Africa
- Editor: Ben Drury
- Running time: 60 minutes
- Production company: BBC Studios

Original release
- Network: BBC One
- Release: 24 March 2013 – 28 April 2020

Our Girl is a British television military drama series written and created by Tony Grounds broadcast on BBC One from 2013 until 2020. The series began with a feature-length television pilot first broadcast on 24 March 2013 starring Lacey Turner as Molly Dawes, a young working-class woman, who joins the British Army after deciding her life is going down the drain. Following the feature-length pilot episode, a continuation show was commissioned, with Turner reprising her role for the first series, which commenced broadcast on 21 September 2014.

Turner left the show after the first series leading to Michelle Keegan being cast as a new character, Georgie Lane, to serve as the new series' protagonist. In January 2019, it was confirmed by the BBC that Keegan would return for a fourth series; she also announced that it would be her last series. It began broadcasting on 24 March 2020. Following Keegan's departure, it was confirmed in August 2020 that the fourth series of Our Girl would be its last.

Much of the show's filming and preparation took place in South Africa, with the location being used to depict Afghanistan in the show's first and fourth series, Kenya in its second, and being used to prepare actors for the conditions of filming while wearing heavy military attire. The third series was filmed in Nepal, where the series took place, for its first part, and Malaysia was used to portray Belize in its second.

Across its run, Our Girl received mixed reception, with reviews leaning more positively for the show's pilot and first two series, and more negatively for its third and fourth. While its production, performances, and action sequences were generally praised, critics agreed that the show glamourised military life and suffered a confused tone as the series progressed.

== Production ==
=== Series development ===
On 18 October 2012, it was announced that Lacey Turner would star in an upcoming 90-minute television drama following a young army recruit, with the pilot set to focus on Turner's character through army training and into service in Afghanistan. Series writer and creator Tony Grounds teased: "This is a film about a female combatant but she is also a daughter and a sister. Every soldier is a citizen first and we explore their choices that lead them to an Army training camp and how the ensuing months will change their lives for ever". Turner added the upcoming drama was "a beautifully written drama of one girl's journey through life". Grounds was enticed to commission the plot after realising that "no conscript is merely a soldier – they are someone's child or sibling, parent or spouse". Grounds said that the concept was in his mind when he visited an army base and was told of a young woman who "was angry as a feral cat" at the start of her basic training, only to become a strong and competent combat medic who served in Afghanistan. He described this woman as "calm, logical, professional and a genuine life saver" as she had "found the 'thing' she was brilliant at". Grounds disclosed that he "had always wanted to write about the young and disenfranchised finding the 'thing' they are brilliant at", and aimed to make it hopeful as he believed "there is something that everyone can excel at". The pilot was commissioned after John Yorke, an executive from the BBC drama department, asked if Grounds had any ideas for Turner. Grounds pitched a plot based on the combat medic as a result. The idea was commissioned with Ken Horn being brought in as producer and David Drury being brought in to direct it. The pilot was completed three years after the initial meeting.

After the pilot episode aired, it was announced that a five-episode television series which would continue the story had been commissioned. For the new series, Grounds aimed to capture the experiences of foot soldiers in Afghanistan, commenting that it allowed opportunities to explore the issues faced by them. It was set to air in 2014 and follow Molly through her first deployment as an army medic while the British Army withdraw from Afghanistan, with Turner reprising her role. BBC One controller Charlotte Moore teased the upcoming series would be "a rite-of-passage story about a young soldier" and would "follow the extreme life-changing experiences [Molly] is forced to face both on tour and when she returns back home". The series was commissioned by Moore and Ben Stephenson, Controller of Drama Commissioning. The executive producers were Caroline Skinner and Tony Grounds. Horn returned as producer and the new series was directed by Anthony Philipson and Richard Senior. Grounds hoped viewers of the series would understand what it was like to be stationed in Afghanistan as a young person: "It's more than just joining the army. You want the audience to sympathise with the soldiers but also love Afghanistan as well with a bit of hope and a way forward".

In June 2015, it was announced that series 2 had begun production. The second series was commissioned by Charlotte Moore and Polly Hill. Executive producers were announced to be Caroline Skinner and Tony Grounds, and directors by Jan Matthys and Luke Snellin. Grounds also returned as writer. and teased the series taking place in a Kenyan refugee camp close to the Kenya/Somalia border, and focus on their conflict. Grounds called it "both daunting and exciting" to have a new series of Our Girl enter production. Grounds based the new series in Kenya as he believed its conflict with Somalia would be "an incredible setting for drama", and the characters would have never "faced anything like the situation they are confronted with". Actor Ben Aldridge confirmed that the refugee camp in the show was based on Dadaab. Keegan also confirmed that the mission was a humanitarian one and would last over a six-week period for 2-Section, and that the new series would contain nods to the original one. It was teased that the characters would quickly find the mission to be "full of surprises".

On 5 October 2016, it was announced that the show would return for a third series. It contained twelve episodes. The series would also be split into two parts, with each focusing on 2-Section in a different tour. Before choosing Nepal as the first part of series' setting, he researched areas that were often struck with natural disasters and helped by the British Army. Grounds intended to call attention to emergency disaster relief for part 1. After Luke Pasqualino told Grounds that he would leave after part 1, Grounds wrote his character's death in to add additional drama to the second part. In May 2018, the second part of series 3 was announced. Part 2 would follow 2-Section through Nigeria, Belize and Bangladesh. Grounds selected Bangladesh as the setting of the final part of the series after hearing stories about Rohingya Muslims crossing the border from Myanmar and living in refugee camps, and found drug lords to be an intimidating enemy. Grounds detailed that he spent a "long time listening to soldiers and people" from around the countries to achieve accuracy and authenticity of the struggles in the areas. It was produced by John Griffin and Lizzie Rushbridger, and executive produced by Grounds, Hilary Salmon and Mona Qureshi.

A fourth series was confirmed in January 2019. The series was written and created by Tony Grounds, produced by Yvonne Francas, and executive produced by Grounds, Roberto Troni, Hilary Salmon and Mona Qureshi.

=== Filming ===
In the pilot, scenes of basic training were filmed at Army Training Centre Pirbright and scenes taking place inside aircraft were filmed at the Royal Air Force Museum Midlands.

Despite being set in Afghanistan, the first series was filmed over a 49-day period in a wildlife reserve called the Serra Della Camp in the Bonte Bok mountain range in South Africa. Horn explained that some days of production were impossible to work in due to strong winds in the area, as some buildings were blown over and production equipment was often damaged. To account for the buildings, specialist teams were brought in to attach steel hawsers to act as guy ropes to prevent serious damage. Horn admitted that despite the constant rebuilding of sets, the show's construction team, who were from South Africa, had "a great 'can do' attitude" due to being used to the climate. While construction was being developed, the actors underwent training for the series, which went on for approximately 10 months.

Series 2 was filmed near Cape Town in South Africa. Skinner explained that it looked different from the first series because the area was "dustier" and a more "desert-like just terrain 20 minutes outside of Cape Town". Skinner called South Africa "an incredible place to film". The Kenyan refugee camp in the show was a township in real life, with locals being used as extras. Series 2 began filming in January 2016. Actors had to attend boot camp in the UK for a few weeks to prepare. After that, they did another week of it in South Africa to get the cast used to the heat and uniforms. Advisors were employed to ensure military accuracy and to help the actors through the hardships of filming. Actors often performed their own stunts, including Keegan, who called them "very physical", but found it to be "liberating", despite finding them "quite extreme". Real weapons were used to train the actors.

In May 2017, the third series commenced filming. Part 1 was filmed in Kathmandu, Nepal, and its surrounding areas. Crew took advantage of filming where the story was set, as scenes were filmed in a village that was affected by the April 2015 Nepal earthquake, similar to the plot. The show's art department enhanced the damage on the village. Scenes taking place in Afghanistan were filmed in a South African desert named Karoo. Preparation was completed in bootcamps in Sandhurst and South Africa. Actors were allowed to perform their own stunts. Scenes taking place in the Belizean jungle were shot in Malaysia, Bangladesh was chosen as the last location for the series to cut costs on transport film equipment, as Bangladesh could also be filmed there. Part 2 was filmed in South Africa and in the Taman Negara jungle in Malaysia over a nine-month period. On occasion, actors filmed six-day weeks.

In April 2019, filming commenced for the show's fourth series. Like series 1, which was also set in Afghanistan, series 4 was filmed in South Africa. Filming wrapped up in July 2019.

=== Cancellation ===
In January 2020, before series 4 began airing, it was announced that Keegan would leave the show after that series to spend time with family. Speaking on her departure, the actress commented that she "had the most incredible four years on the show" and "loved every second". It was reported that former EastEnders actress Jacqueline Jossa was in advanced talks to replace her as the lead should the show be greenlit for a fifth series. In August 2020, it was announced that the show would not return for a fifth series, with Grounds explaining that as series 4's final episode showed Georgie moving on, it felt right for the crew to do the same. Piers Wenger, Controller of BBC Drama, commented that the BBC were "very proud of Our Girl" and thanked Grounds, Keegan, and the remainder of the cast and crew for their hard work over the years.

== Casting ==
For the pilot, Lacey Turner was cast as Molly Dawes, whom the actress described as "an interesting character who shows such strength and determination". A BBC spokesperson billed Molly as "colourful, unique and powerful". After the pilot's success spawned the followup series, Turner reprised her role as Molly, describing her as "feisty", "disobedient", and "passionate", but that her character had become "more grown up". Turner was accompanied by two new main characters, Captain James and Dylan 'Smurf' Smith, played by Ben Aldridge and Iwan Rheon, respectively, who would be involved in a love triangle with Molly. Aldridge described his character as "an interesting mix of authority and fun", possessing a "laissez-faire attitude". Rheon billed Smurf as a "conflicted" "golden boy" who was "smitten" with Molly.

After Turner left the show to return to her role as Stacey Slater on EastEnders, it was announced that Michelle Keegan had been cast as Georgie Lane, a new protagonist for the series. Keegan described her new role as a "big but exciting challenge". Keegan disclosed that to prepare for Georgie, she had met with army medics to hear their stories to gain a better understanding of her character. Keegan described her character as follows: "Georgie is an experienced army medic. She is good at her job, very professional and she knows what she wants in her life. Georgie puts her work first and not afraid to get stuck in, especially with the lads as well. I wouldn't say she is the alpha, but she doesn't take anything lying down". After Grounds hinted on Twitter that Captain James would return, and Aldridge had also expressed enthusiasm to return, his return was confirmed in March 2016. The third main character for the second series was revealed later in the same month to be a new character named Elvis Harte, set to be played by Luke Pasqualino, an ex-fling of Georgie's. Other cast members joining in series 2 included Royce Pierreson as Dr Jamie Cole, Rolan Bell as Sergeant King, Sean Sagar as Monk and Anthony Oseyemi as the Kenyan forces' Captain Osman.

For series 3, a new lead character, Maisie Richards, to be played by Shalom Brune-Franklin, was announced. She was described as "very outspoken and rebellious" and would "instantly" be at odds with Georgie. Pasqualino described the character as "a spanner in the works" of Georgie and Elvis's relationship. Other new cast members included Rudi Dharmalingam as Milan Dhakal, an engineer set to "catch Georgie's eye", and Harki Bhambra as Rab Khalil, described as being a smarter member of 2-Section. Olly Rix was cast as 'Bones' for the second part. The actor described him as "a tricky kind of guy" and "abrasive, brash and yet highly competent as a soldier". He concluded "for all his naughtiness, he's a decent man with a healthy disrespect for authority". Grounds billed Bones as a "flawed but dedicated" soldier "with a massive heart". Maisie, Rab, Sergeant King, Brains, Monk, and Fingers all returned, with their actors reprising their respective roles.

Series 4 saw a major overhaul in its main cast, as Aldridge, Brune-Franklin, and Bhambra all left the show. Keegan returned as Georgie. Kaine Zajaz received the part of Throbber, a new recruit who was billed as "a bit of a naughty character" and a "risk-taker" by Keegan. Amy-Leigh Hickman joined the series as Mimi Saunders, described by Keegan as a bit "like a younger Georgie". Nico Mirallegro was cast as Prof, a "complex" individual with a many layers. Danny-Boy Hatchard was cast as Rhett 'Cheese' Charlton, who was described as "confident", "cool", and someone with "many a practical joke up his sleeve". Josh Bowman earned the part of Dr Antonio.

=== Cast overview ===
==== 2-Section ====
- Lacey Turner as Private Molly Dawes, MC (pilot–series 1)
- Michelle Keegan as Lance Corporal/Corporal/Sergeant Georgie Lane (series 2–4)
- Will Attenborough as Second Lieutenant Oliver 'Sandy' Hurst (series 4)
- Ben Aldridge as Captain Charles James (series 1–3)
- Danny Hatchard as Private Rhett 'Cheese' Charlton (series 4)
- Amy-Leigh Hickman as Mimi Saunders (series 4)
- Nico Mirallegro as Private 'Prof' Grant (series 4)
- Kaine Zajaz as Private Kane 'Throbber' Wolfe (series 4)
- Simon Lennon as Private Harry 'Brains' Wiggerty (series 1–3)
- Sean Ward as Private Frankie 'Fingers' Stille (series 1–4)
- Sean Sagar as Private Jaiden 'Monk' Montgomery (series 2–4)
- Rolan Bell as Colour Sergeant King (series 2–4)
- Harki Bhambra as Private Rab Kalil (series 3)
- Shalom Brune-Franklin as Private Maisie Richards (series 3)
- Patrick McNamee as Private Jason 'Ruby' Curry (series 3)
- John Michie as Brigadier (series 3)
- Dominic Jephcott as Brigadier (series 4)
- Adam Astill as Major Beck (series 1)
- Iwan Rheon as Private Dylan 'Smurf' Smith (series 1)
- Lawrence Walker as Private 'Dangleberries' (series 1–2)
- Nick Preston as Private Mike 'Mansfield Mike' Cheam (series 1–2)
- Arinze Kene as Corporal 'Eggy' Kinders (series 1)
- Charley Palmer Rothwell as Private 'Baz Vegas' (series 1)
- Ade Oyefeso as Private 'Nude-Nut' (series 1)

==== Special Forces ====
- Luke Pasqualino as Captain Elvis Harte (series 2–3)
- Olly Rix as Captain 'Bones' McClyde (series 3)
- Mark Armstrong as SFS 'Spanner' (series 2–4)
- Dwane Walcott as SFS 'Peanut' (series 3)
- Ashley Houston as SFS 'Dyno' (series 3)
- Jed O'Hagan as SFS 'Spunky' (series 2)
- Jack Parry Jones as SFS 'Jackson' (series 2–4)
- Ben Batt as SFS 'Blue' (series 3–4)

==== Families ====
- Kerry Godliman as Belinda Dawes (pilot–series 1)
- Sean Gallagher as Dave Dawes (pilot–series 1)
- Mimi Keene as Jade Dawes (pilot)
- Sean Gilder as Max Lane (series 2–4)
- Angela Lonsdale as Grace Lane (series 2–4)
- Linzey Cocker as Marie Lane (series 2–4)
- Molly Wright as Lulu Lane (series 2)
- Royce Pierreson as Dr. Jamie Cole (series 2)

==== Army ====
- Matthew McNulty as Corporal Geddings; British Army (pilot)
- Fiona Skinner as Corporal Richards; British Army (pilot)
- Kirsty Averton as Private Jackie Aston; British Army (series 1)

==== Alliances (Army) ====
- Jonas Khan as Captain Azizi; Afghan National Army (series 1, 3)
- Tamer Burjaq as Sohail; Afghan National Army (series 1)
- Zubin Varla as Qaseem; British Army, Teacher (series 1)
- Anthony Oseyemi as Captain Osman; Kenya Army (series 2)
- Pranesh Maharaj as Major Thapa; Nepalese Army (series 3)
- Steve Toussaint as Captain Roger Mendez; Belize Armed Forces (series 3)
- Patrick Sithole as Adewole; Nigerian Army (series 3)
- Hamza Jeetooaad as Captain Das; Bangladesh Army (series 3)
- Josh Bowman as (Dr.) Captain Antonio; United States Army (series 4)
- Nebras Jamali as Cadet Poya Afghan National Army (series 4)

==== Alliances ====
- Yusra Warsama as Nafula – NGO (series 2)
- Anna Tena as Kicki – NGO (series 2)
- Rudi Dharmalingam as Milan – NGO (series 3)
- Farzana Dua Elahe as Barsha Chowdhrey – NGO (series 3)
- Badria Timimi as Dr Bahil (series 4)

==== Main Enemies ====
- Aubrey Shelton as Badrai (series 1)
- Michael James as Jason Raynott (series 2)
- Sabin Basnet as Da Chand (series 3)
- Nebras Jamali as Poya (series 4)
- Nabil Elouahabi as Aatan/ Aaban Omar (Rabee) (series 4)
- Kiroshan Naidoo as Zarek (series 4)

==== Others ====
- Becky Eggersglusz as Bashira (series 1)
- Salina Shrestha as Tara (series 3)
- Navin Chowdhry as Inspector Ratna Chowdhrey (series 3)

== Episodes ==
Series	Episodes		Originally released		Average UK viewers (millions)
Series	Episodes		First released	Last released	Average UK viewers (millions)
Pilot			24 March 2013		6.31
1	5		21 September 2014	19 October 2014	5.24
2	5		7 September 2016	5 October 2016	6.07
3	12	4	10 October 2017	31 October 2017	5.11
3	12	8	5 June 2018	24 July 2018	5.11
4	6		24 March 2020	28 April 2020	4.61

== Reception ==
=== Critical and viewer response ===
The pilot episode received mixed-to-positive reactions. Dan Owen of MSN praised Turner's performance, but criticised "some clunky moments and weird shortcuts" in the story. Sarah Crompton of The Telegraph gave the episode 3/5 stars, calling it "a compelling 90 minutes", but criticising the depiction of the army as being more suited to "a glossy advertising campaign" than a drama, adding that the pilot "glamorised both its methods and its personnel". Despite mixed critical response, audience reactions were generally positive on Twitter. Sam Wollaston of The Guardian called the pilot "clichéd and schmaltzy", and deemed Molly's character development as unrealistic. He added that it was "naive, crude", and "practically a recruitment video for the army". Despite this, Wollaston found himself "swept along" by it, complimenting Turner's performance as being "gutsy" and "very watchable", overall concluding that the pilot was enjoyable. Tom Sutcliffe of The Independent commented that, despite the plot being "familiar": "As recruitment films go, it was much better written and acted than the usual output" and that it "was so unequivocally approving of the benefits of joining up that it seemed entirely possible that viewers at a loose end might consider giving Army life a go".

The first series was generally well received. Dale Cowan of Cultbox awarded the series 5 stars, explaining "Director Anthony Philipson's visually stimulating direction continues to impress as does the writing from creator Tony Grounds, who has produced something truly wonderful". Cowan continued by praising the performances of the series, naming Sean Gallagher and Kerry Godliman's performances as "honest" and adding "emotional realism", and Turner's as being "warmth and human", describing it as "electric". However, Cowan criticised open ends left in the final episode of the first series, naming some plot lines as "unfinished". Julian White of The Least Picture Show gave the first series a 7/10, considering Turner's performance as a positive as the actress "does a magnificent job of making her seem warm-hearted and funny". White also praised the writing of the characters, particularly Captain James. He concluded: "For all its occasional flaws and excesses, Our Girl paints a portrait of men and women in uniform who haven't allowed a long and bloody conflict to dampen one iota of their humanity". Kendall Hutt of Square Eyes commented that she "loved" the series, singing praises towards the characters, performances, and direction. Henry Tucker of Blueprint Review gave the series 4/5 stars, concluding that "if you like your military viewing with lots of bangs and gunfights then give this a very wide berth. If you would rather engage with the personal side of warfare and how it affects those in the middle of it, then this is for you".

Cowan described Turner's departure from the series as "bittersweet". Elliott Gonzalez of I Talk Telly praised Keegan's performance in the series premiere, saying "she did a really great job". Michael Hogan of The Telegraph gave the premiere a mixed review, 3/5 stars, praising the drama, "adrenalin-pumping action", "tantalising cliffhanger", and Keegan's "tough-but-vulnerable" performance, but criticised the dialogue, mainly the "clichéd sexist 'banter'", and underwritten characters. Julia Raeside was also critical of the script, as it intailed "unpleasant sexist banter", but praised how "the romance manages to coexist with the military drama while still keeping its boots on the ground". Adam Starkey of the Metro reported mixed reactions on Twitter to Keegan's portrayal in comparison to Turner's. Cowan praised the second episode, commenting: "The musical score is subtle yet cinematic and aids the sparkling direction from Jan Matthys well. The supporting artists are also very strong here". However, was critical of the episodes' lack of stakes: "despite the sense of urgency the episode tries to create, it seems to fall flat in places and doesn't have the necessary impact that we were hoping it would". Justin Harp of Digital Spy reported that the fourth episode had viewers "chomping at the bit during the non-stop thriller". Cowan praised the series finale, as it ended with "drama, suspense and action".

Euan Ferguson of The Guardian was critical of the third series, labelling it as having "dishearten[ed]" him. He further criticised the show's new characters and the script. Ed Power of The Telegraph awarded the first episode of series 3 3/5 stars, praising Keegan's portrayal but criticising the new characters and 2-Section as they "spent most of the time larking, bantering and mucking about, like a heavily-armed stag party". Thomas Ling of Radio Times echoed the criticisms, particularly citing positive Twitter responses to Georgie's return and negative reactions to the new character Maisie Richards. The finale of part 1 was poorly received by audiences, partly due to the death of Elvis. Additionally, Alana Anderson of OK! magazine noted viewer criticisms towards plot holes surrounding a phone's battery life. Alistair McKay of The Standard criticised the first episode of the Nigeria Tour, describing its depiction of army life as "almost teenage in its simplicity". Adam Sweeting of The Arts Desk awarded it 2/5 stars, concluding it as being "awfully silly all round". The third series received rampant viewer criticism for a lack of Elvis, the ending of Captain James and Molly's marriage, as well as his eventual relationship with Georgie, several medical inaccuracies shown, and Bones's premature death.

=== Awards and nominations ===
Year	Award	Category	Nominee(s)	Result	Ref.
2014	Royal Television Society Programme Awards	Single Drama	"Pilot"	Nominated	
2015	GTC Awards	Best TV Drama	Our Girl	Won	
2018	British Screenwriters' Awards	Best British TV Drama Writing	Our Girl	Nominated	
2018	TV Choice Awards	Best Actress	Michelle Keegan	Won	
2019	National Television Awards	Drama Performance	Michelle Keegan	Nominated	
