= Nick Corporon =

American filmmaker

Nick Corporon is an American filmmaker who directed the feature film Retake (2016) and the short films Barbie Boy and Last Call.

== Early life and education ==
Corporon was born in Parsons, Kansas and raised in Lexington, Missouri.Film Festival Celebrates Its Kansas City Roots - OutVoices He attended Missouri State University and received his Master of Fine Arts from Chapman University.

== Career ==
Corporon wrote and directed the short film Last Call (2009) as his graduate thesis at Chapman University. It played at the Frameline Film Festival, CineGear Film Festival, and Palm Springs International Shortfest. It was distributed by Peccadillo Pictures in the UK. His short film Barbie Boy (2012) played at The Austin Film Festival. It won the prestigious Alfred C. Kinsey prize for "Continuing the Discussion on Gender" and the audience award for Best Short at Dances with Films.

His feature directional debut Retake premiered at the 2016 Frameline Film Festival and went on to play Outfest, Newfest, Cinema Diverse, Out on Film and many more. The film starred Tuc Watkins, Devon Graye, Sydelle Noel, Derek Phillips, and Kit Williamson. The film was partially financed by a Kickstarter campaign.Film Festival Celebrates Its Kansas City Roots - OutVoices

Retake is distributed by Breaking Glass Pictures and premiered in Los Angeles on January 6, 2017, with a VOD/DVD release later that year.
