= Matthew Berkowitz =

American film director and journalist

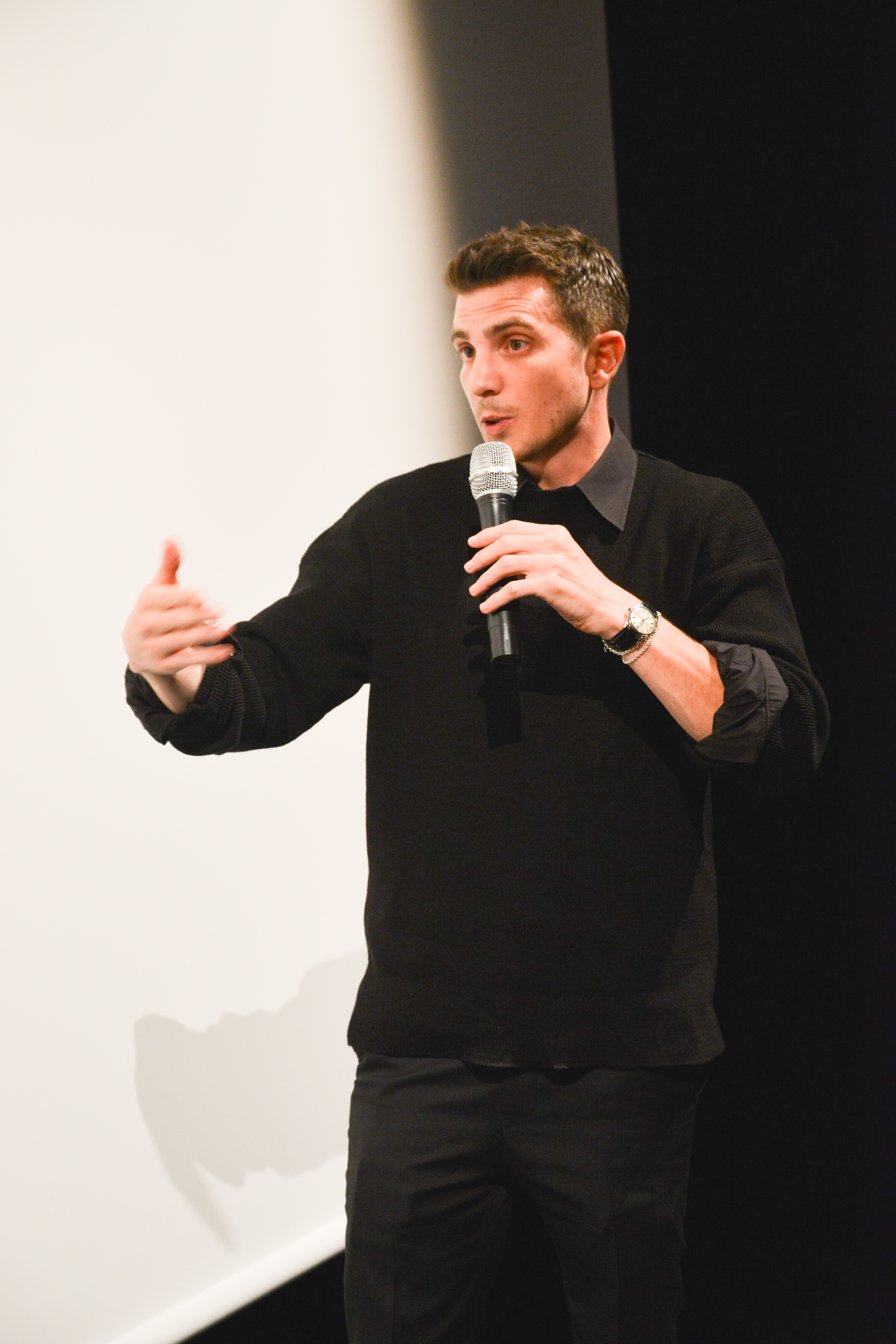
- Occupations: Film director, writer, and producer
- Years active: 2015 - present

Matthew Berkowitz is an American film director, writer, and producer. He has written and directed three feature films (Wild in Blue, A Violent Man, The Madness Inside Me).

== Early life and career ==
Berkowitz went to Pitzer College in Claremont, California, where he studied philosophy and film. He cites Brian De Palma, Alfred Hitchcock, Lars von Trier and Gaspar Noé as some of his cinematic influences.

Berkowitz made his screenwriting and directing debut in 2015 with his psychological thriller film Wild in Blue starring Frank Cermak Jr., Daveigh Chase, Karen Black, Charlotte Price, Marcos Mateo Ochoa, and Steve Railsback. The film gained attention with what the filmmakers dubbed "terrorist marketing" when they attempted to purchase a billboard advertisement on Sunset Boulevard featuring a still from the film depicting Chase in a pose that they knew would be rejected by the advertising company. The rejection was reported by TMZ. Wild in Blue received several awards, including Best Feature Film at the 2015 St. Tropez International Film Festival and Best Director and Best Lead Actor at the 2015 Madrid International Film Festival.

Later Berkowitz wrote and directed the neo-noir thriller film A Violent Man, which starred Thomas Q. Jones, Isaach de Bankolé, Chuck Liddell, and Denise Richards. A Violent Man had its world premiere at the 2017 Oldenburg International Film Festival and its U.S. premiere at the 2018 Miami Film Festival, with the Miami Film Festival guide stating that "director Matthew Berkowitz’s second outing speaks to the power of film noir to shine a light on the base impulses brewing below our civilized exteriors." Alan Ng of Film Threat called the film "a testament to how filmmakers can tell big stories with small budgets."

Berkowitz also wrote and directed the psychological thriller The Madness Inside Me starring Merrin Dungey, Devon Graye, Thomas Q. Jones, John Buffalo Mailer, and Anthony DeSando. It premiered at the 2020 Oldenburg International Film Festival. The Madness Inside Me was later acquired by Gravitas Ventures and was released on digital platforms, Blu-ray, and DVD on September 3, 2021. Anthony Francis of Screen Comment called The Madness Inside Me "Well-directed and extremely well-written."

Berkowitz has also produced several films including The Queen of Hollywood Blvd, Ms. Long Legs, written and directed by Milo Addica, DieRy, and Corbin Nash.

== Filmography ==
=== Films ===
Year	Title	Director	Producer	Writer	Editor
2015	Wild in Blue	Yes	Yes	Yes	Yes
2017	The Queen of Hollywood Blvd.		Yes		
2017	A Violent Man	Yes	Yes	Yes	Yes
2018	Corbin Nash		Yes		
2020	DieRy		Yes		
2021	The Madness Inside Me	Yes	Yes	Yes	Yes

=== Short films ===
Year	Title	Director	Producer	Writer	Editor
2010	Father's Day				Yes
2013	The Heeler				Yes
2014	Ms. Long Legs		Yes		Yes
2014	Pineapples		Yes		

== Awards and nominations ==
List of awards
Year	Award	Nomination	Film	Result	Notes
2015	Madrid International Film Festival	Best Director	Wild in Blue	Won	
2015	Madrid International Film Festival	Best Original Screenplay of a Feature Film	Wild in Blue	Nominated	
2015	Madrid International Film Festival	Best Film	Wild in Blue	Nominated	Shared with Robert A. Ferretti and Felix Lee
2015	St. Tropez International Film Festival	Best Feature Film	Wild in Blue	Won	
2015	St. Tropez International Film Festival	Best Director	Wild in Blue	Nominated	
2016	International Filmmaker Festival of World Cinema	Best Director	Wild in Blue	Nominated	
2016	International Filmmaker Festival of World Cinema	Best Film	Wild in Blue	Nominated	Shared with Robert A. Ferretti and Felix Lee
2017	Oldenburg International Film Festival	Best Film	A Violent Man	Nominated	
2018	Miami Film Festival	Best Feature Film	A Violent Man	Nominated	
