= Orson Oblowitz =

American filmmaker and cinematographer

Orson Oblowitz is an American filmmaker and cinematographer.

== Filmography ==
=== As cinematographer ===
- Sea of Darkness (2008)
- A Thousand Year Journey (2014)
- Heavy Water (2015)
- Harumi (2019)
- The Five Rules of Success (2020)

=== As producer ===
- The Queen of Hollywood Blvd. (2017)
- The Violent Man (2017; co-producer)
- Corbin Nash (2018; co-producer)
- DieRy (2020; co-producer)

=== As writer/director ===
- The Queen of Hollywood Blvd (2017)
- Trespassers (2018; director only)
- The Five Rules of Success (2020)
- Showdown at the Grand (2023)

=== As actor ===
- This World, Then the Fireworks (1997) as Eugene
- On the Borderline (2001) as Guatemalan boy
- God Bless America (2011) as TMI Flunky
- The Queen of Hollywood Blvd (2017) as Otto
