= Thomas Jones (American football) =

American football player and actor (born 1978)

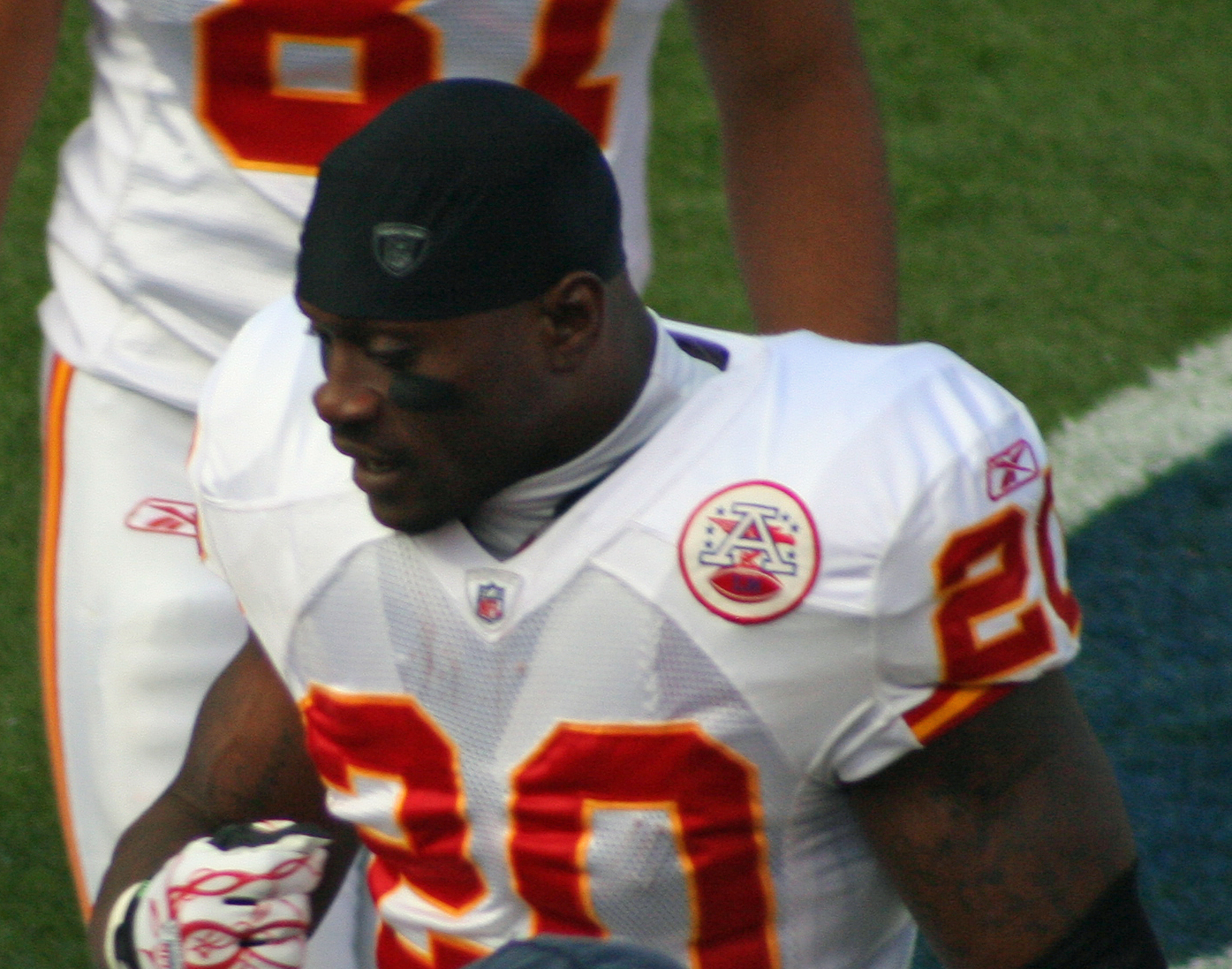
- Jones with the Kansas City Chiefs in 2010

No. 26, 22, 20
- Position: Running back

Personal information
- Born: August 19, 1978 (age 48); Big Stone Gap, Virginia, U.S.
- Listed height: 5 ft 10 in (1.78 m)
- Listed weight: 212 lb (96 kg)

Career information
- High school: Powell Valley (Big Stone Gap)
- College: Virginia (1996–1999)
- NFL draft: 2000: 1st round, 7th overall pick

Career history
- Arizona Cardinals (2000–2002); Tampa Bay Buccaneers (2003); Chicago Bears (2004–2006); New York Jets (2007–2009); Kansas City Chiefs (2010–2011)

Awards and highlights
- Pro Bowl (2008); Consensus All-American (1999); 2× First-team All-ACC (1998, 1999); Virginia Cavaliers Jersey No. 6 retired

Career NFL statistics
- Rushing yards: 10,591
- Rushing average: 4.0
- Rushing touchdowns: 68
- Receptions: 308
- Receiving yards: 2,023
- Receiving touchdowns: 3
- Stats at Pro Football Reference

Thomas Quinn Jones (born August 19, 1978) is an American actor and former professional football player. He played as a running back for 12 seasons in the National Football League (NFL). Jones played college football for the Virginia Cavaliers, earning consensus All-American honors in 1999. He was selected by the Arizona Cardinals seventh overall in the 2000 NFL draft, and played for the Tampa Bay Buccaneers in addition to the New York Jets, Chicago Bears, and Kansas City Chiefs. He retired among the top 25 leading rushers in NFL history (currently 27th), and a member of the 10,000 rushing yards club. In September 2019 he was nominated for the Pro Football Hall of Fame Class of 2020.

In 2013, performing under the name Thomas Q. Jones due to the SAG-AFTRA's unique stage name requirements, he began an acting career. Among his credits are 2015's Straight Outta Compton and a recurring role in the Luke Cage series.

== Early life ==
Thomas was born in Big Stone Gap, Virginia. His mother, Betty, worked the graveyard shift in a Virginia coal mine for nearly 20 years while raising seven children, including his younger brother, Julius Jones. While in Appalachia, Virginia, his father encouraged the children to learn five new words per day, and made them read the front page of the newspaper, before they could read the sports section. Jones credits his parents with instilling the ambition and strong work ethic that he is known for in professional football.

While playing for Powell Valley High School in Big Stone Gap, he led the team to back-to-back state championships in 1994 and 1995. He still holds the VHSL record for the most rushing yards in a season with 3,319. He broke his late uncle's (Edd Clark) single-game rushing record in 1994 (462 yards against John I. Burton High School). He also tied for most career touchdowns (104) with Terry Kirby. Thomas was featured in the January 22 (1996) issue of Sports Illustrated section, Faces in the Crowd.

== College football career ==
Jones attended the University of Virginia, and played for coach George Welsh's Virginia Cavaliers football team from 1996 to 1999. Through four years, he left his mark on the record books of both the team and the Atlantic Coast Conference (ACC). He ended his career at Virginia with eight conference and fifteen team records, including finishing as the Cavaliers' all-time rushing leader with 3,998 yards, eclipsing the previous mark of 3,389 yards set by Tiki Barber. His rushing total was the fourth highest in conference history. Jones also set the conference and school record for single season rushing (1,798 yards) and single season all-purpose offense (2,054 yards). While becoming the first player in ACC history to attain 200 yards rushing and 100 yards receiving in a single game, Jones set a single game school record with 331 all-purpose yards against the University at Buffalo. Setting an ACC record for 200-yard games, Jones finished with six 200-yard rushing performances. He finished his college career with 4,698 all-purpose yards, fourth all-time at Virginia.

As a senior in 1999, Jones was voted as a consensus first-team All-American by The Associated Press, Football News, the Football Writers Association of America, Walter Camp Foundation, and The Sporting News. Finishing 8th in balloting for the 1999 Heisman Trophy, he was the first ACC consensus All-American running back since 1978 (Ted Brown, NC State) and third in league history. Jones led the conference running backs and receiving yards, amassed four 200-yard games, and finished third in the nation in rushing (163.5 yards/game) and all-purpose yards (186.7 yards/game).

While successful on the field, Jones also focused in the classroom, earning his bachelor's degree in psychology in three years.

== Professional football career ==
=== Arizona Cardinals ===
Thomas Jones was chosen by the Arizona Cardinals in the first round of the 2000 NFL draft with the seventh overall selection. In his three years with Arizona he rushed for 1,264 yards and 9 touchdowns. He was injury-prone, however, and finished only one full season (2001) for the Cardinals. Up until the 2002 season he also was splitting time with running back Michael Pittman. Jones was traded in 2003 to the Tampa Bay Buccaneers.

=== Tampa Bay Buccaneers ===
Though not the featured back in Tampa Bay, Jones played an injury-free season, gained 627 yards, and scored three rushing touchdowns while averaging 4.6 yards per carry.

=== Chicago Bears ===
As a free agent in 2004, Jones received his opportunity to be a featured back, signing a multi-year contract with Chicago. In his first season with Chicago, he rushed for 948 yards and 7 touchdowns. After the season, Ron Turner took over as offensive coordinator and installed zone blocking schemes that utilized Jones's speed and ability to make quick decisions. Heading into the 2005 NFL season, Jones figured to return to sharing duty as the Bears used their top draft pick on running back Cedric Benson. However, a lengthy hold-out prevented Benson from pushing Jones for playing time. After starting the season with a poor performance against the Washington Redskins defense, Jones proceeded to recover with season statistics of 1,335 yards and 9 touchdowns. Jones amassed 61 first downs while averaging 4.3 yards per carry. A veteran with, at that time, six years league experience, Jones continued to see extended playing time to assist the offensive line with pass blocking for Rex Grossman. After the 2005 season, Jones fired his agent and hired Drew Rosenhaus in April 2006.

Jones did not participate in the Bears’ voluntary off season program in 2006, opting instead to work out on his own, leading to Benson lining up with the first team during workouts. On July 26, Jones injured his hamstring during a physical at the Bears' summer camp; Lovie Smith announced Jones would fall behind Cedric Benson on the depth chart. However, on August 4, Benson injured his shoulder after colliding with Brian Urlacher during a routine practice drill, and Jones returned to his featured back position.

The Bears’ two-headed rushing attack showcased both players during the 2006 season. Benson, at 5-foot-11 and 230 pounds, acted as a straight-ahead runner, whereas Jones used his quicker 5-foot-10 and 215-pound frame to find holes in Chicago's zone-blocking scheme to get through the defense. During the regular season, Jones gained 1,210 yards and Benson amassed 647 yards; both averaged over four yards per carry. Jones had four 100-yard performances during the regular season and continued to see an increased role in the passing game as Benson had not yet mastered pass protection. That year, Thomas and his brother Julius became the first brother tandem in NFL history to rush for 1,000 yards in the same season.

During the 2006 playoffs, Jones rushed for 66 yards and two touchdowns on 21 carries en route to a 27–24 Bears’ victory over the Seattle Seahawks. The next week he rushed for 123 yards and two touchdowns on 19 carries in the NFC championship game against the New Orleans Saints, helping the Bears advance to the Super Bowl with a 39–14 win. Jones's 123 rushing yards against the Saints set a Bears postseason record. On a crucial drive late in the first half, after three stalled Bears drives ended in field goals, Jones ran the ball on every play of an eight-play, 69-yard drive and scored the Bears' first touchdown of the game.

Jones was one of three college teammates who reunited in Super Bowl XLI. Jones, his teammate John St. Clair, and Terrence Wilkins of the Indianapolis Colts were roommates at the University of Virginia. In Super Bowl XLI, Jones finished with 112 yards rushing and 18 yards receiving, including a 52-yard run that marked Chicago's longest run of the season. Though averaging 7.5 yards per carry in the game, the Bears only called 15 running plays in the 29–17 loss to Indianapolis.

=== New York Jets ===
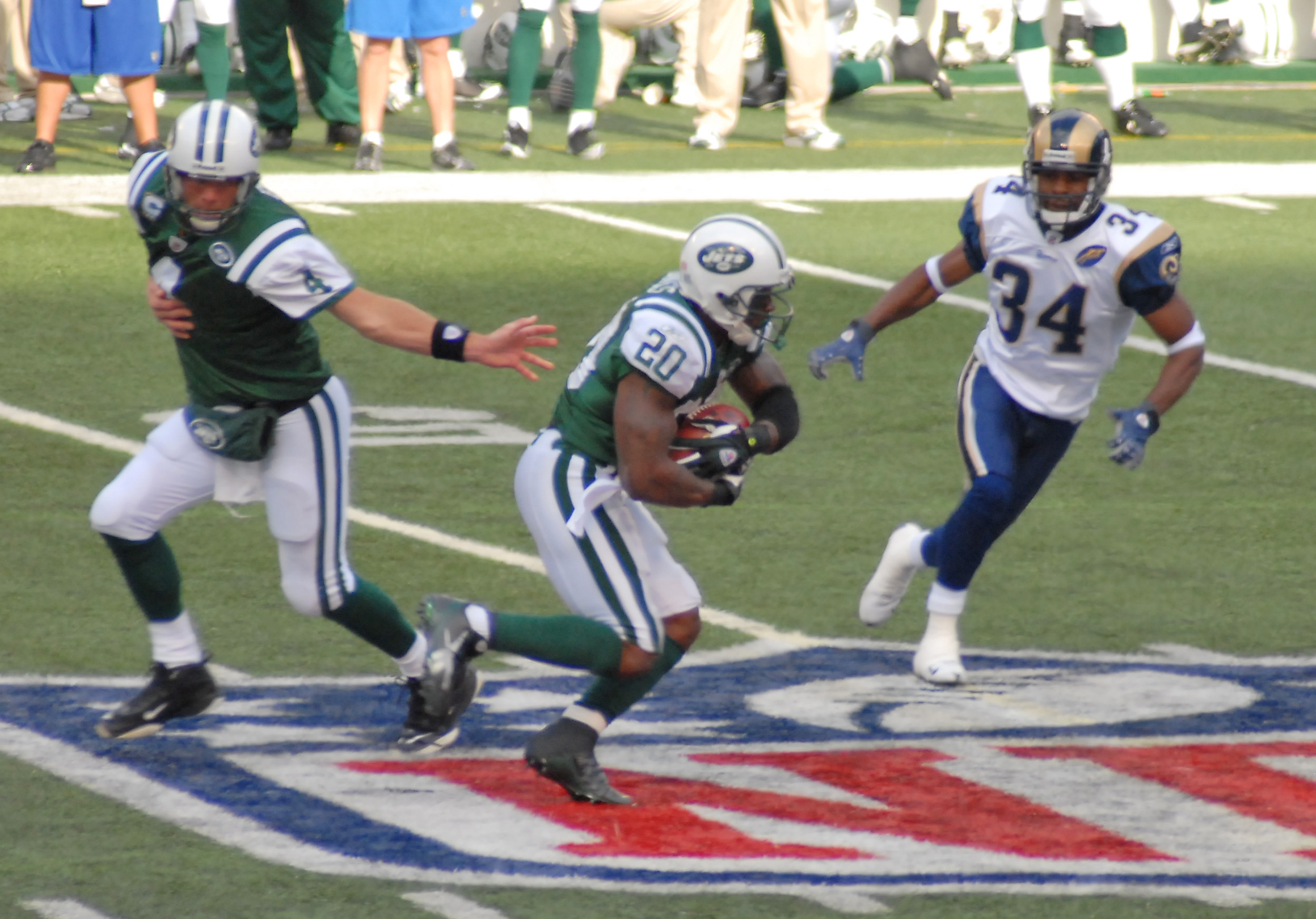
Jones and Brett Favre in 2008

On March 5, 2007, the Bears traded Jones and their second-round pick (63rd overall) in the 2007 NFL draft to the New York Jets in exchange for their second-round pick (from the Washington Redskins) (37th overall). Following the completion of the trade, the Jets signed Jones to a four-year, $25 million extension.

In the 2007 season, Jones carried the ball 310 times for 1,119 yards, his third straight one-thousand yard season. Of note, Jones scored the first receiving touchdown of his career as well. However, he averaged a subpar 3.6 yards a carry, and scored only one rushing TD, as the Jets stumbled to a 4–12 finish.

Jones had his best season in 2008. Named the AFC's starting running back in the Pro Bowl, Jones scored 15 total touchdowns, including two via receptions, and rushed for 1,312 yards to lead the AFC.

On October 18, 2009, in a game against the Buffalo Bills, Jones rushed for a Jets franchise record 210 yards and a touchdown, breaking the old mark set by Curtis Martin. However, the Jets lost 16–13 in overtime. On December 3, 2009, Jones reached 1,068 rushing yards for the 2009 season against the Buffalo Bills. This would mark the fifth consecutive season in which Jones has rushed for 1,000+ yards.

On January 17, 2010, Jones converted a final minute 4th and 1 to lead the Jets to victory over the San Diego Chargers in a 2009 playoff game. The win ensured that the Jets would play the Indianapolis Colts in the 2009 AFC championship game.

On March 1, 2010, the New York Jets announced that they would release Jones as of March 5, 2010, due to an upcoming contract bonus (all despite having a career-high season with 1,402 rushing yards) and talks with LaDainian Tomlinson. He was officially released on March 5.

=== Kansas City Chiefs ===
Jones signed a two-year contract with the Kansas City Chiefs on March 9, 2010. He was part of a rushing tandem with Jamaal Charles for the 2010 season that saw Jones (896) and Charles (1,467) combining for over 2,000 yards in 2010. In the week 15 game against the St. Louis Rams, Jones ran for 62 yards on 22 carries with one touchdown in a game that saw him achieve the 10,000-yard rushing mark, becoming the 25th player to accomplish this in NFL history.

The 2011 season did not go as well for the Chiefs, and Jones rushed for 478 yards on 153 carries (Charles was hurt two games into the season). In his final game as a player, Jones ran for 42 yards on 15 carries in a 7-3 win over the Broncos. In 2013, now retired, Jones announced that he would donate his brain to the Sports Legacy Institute to be studied for chronic traumatic encephalopathy (CTE).

== NFL career statistics ==
Year	Team	GP	Rushing						Receiving							Fumbles	
Year	Team	GP	Att	Yds	Avg	Lng	TD	FD	Rec	Tgt	Yds	Avg	Lng	TD	FD	Fum	Lost
2000	ARI	14	112	373	3.3	29	2	23	32	–	208	6.5	20	0	9	4	3
2001	ARI	16	112	380	3.4	21	5	22	21	–	151	7.2	18	0	6	2	1
2002	ARI	9	138	511	3.7	58	2	21	20	–	113	5.7	17	0	4	3	2
2003	TB	16	137	627	4.6	61	3	25	24	–	180	7.5	29	0	9	4	2
2004	CHI	14	240	948	4.0	54	7	49	56	–	427	7.6	45	0	16	2	1
2005	CHI	15	314	1,335	4.3	42	9	61	26	–	143	5.5	41	0	6	2	2
2006	CHI	16	296	1,210	4.1	30	6	61	36	47	154	4.3	21	0	5	1	1
2007	NYJ	16	310	1,119	3.6	36	1	55	28	34	217	7.8	25	1	8	2	0
2008	NYJ	16	290	1,312	4.5	59	13	63	36	42	207	5.8	19	2	12	2	1
2009	NYJ	16	331	1,402	4.2	71	14	64	10	18	58	5.8	28	0	4	2	0
2010	KC	16	245	896	3.7	70	6	39	14	20	122	8.7	20	0	8	3	1
2011	KC	16	153	478	3.1	26	0	19	5	7	43	8.6	27	0	1	0	0
Career		180	2,678	10,591	4.0	71	68	502	308	168	2,023	6.6	45	3	88	27	14

=== New York Jets franchise records ===
- Most rushing touchdowns in a single season (14 in 2009)

=== Football career awards and highlights ===
- Pro Football Hall of Fame Class of 2020 Nominee
- Virginia Sports Hall of Fame Inductee (2018)
- Member of the NFL's 10,000 Rushing Yards Club
- Pro Bowl (2008)
- First-team All-Pro PFWA (2008)
- First-team All-AFC (2008)
- Consensus All-American (1999)
- First-team All ACC (1999)
- First-team All ACC (1998)

== Post-football career ==
Jones has said that he has decided to donate his brain to the Sports Legacy Institute, which studies the link between sports and brain trauma, for research upon his death. In January 2017, Jones stated that if he had to do it over, he would not play football due to the physical consequences.

Jones is founder and CEO of technology company Castar Applications Inc.

== Acting career ==
Jones has since become a film and television actor, performing under the name Thomas Q. Jones.

Jones is the owner of the production company Independently Major Entertainment Films (IME Films), which produced A Violent Man (2019) for Sony Pictures, in which he starred and directed by Matthew Berkowitz. He headlined the independent film Runaway Island (2015) alongside Lorraine Toussaint and Aisha Hinds. He appeared in Straight Outta Compton the 2015 feature film based on the lives and careers of hip-hop group N.W.A.

In 2016, Jones produced and acted in a screen adaptation of the graphic novel Loyalty, with Lucien Laviscount, and acted in the independent short film project, Love and the Line, and the independent feature film 9 Rides, shot entirely using 4K video with an iPhone 6s.

In television, Jones is best known for his Marvel character "Comanche" on the Netflix series Luke Cage. He guest starred in the BET Network series Tales and in Seasons 2 and 3 of the BET hit drama series Being Mary Jane, in a multi-episode arc as "Brandon 'Cutty Buddy' Gibson," love interest to Gabrielle Union's title character. On the TV ONE comedy series Born Again Virgin, Jones guest-starred as commercial pilot Vince, a love interest of the series lead played by Danielle Nicolet. He also appeared in featured roles in the Showtime series Shameless and IFC's Comedy Bang! Bang!. Jones will be in a recurring role on the Starz series P-Valley (2020).

== Filmography ==
=== Film ===
Year	Title	Role	Notes
2015	Runaway Island	Raphael Burrows	TV movie
2015	Supermodel	-	
2015	Straight Outta Compton	Large Man	
2016	9 Rides	Abusive Man	
2016	Addicted to You	Damien Murphy	TV movie
2016	Love and the Line	-	Short
2017	Mine	Christian	Short
2017	Back 2 Life	Omar	Short
2017	A Violent Man	Ty	
2017	Andover	Wyatt	
2018	Corbin Nash	Darius	
2019	#Truth	Primo	
2020	DieRy	Harris	
2020	Catching Up	Damien	Short
2021	The Madness Inside Me	Detective Thompson	
2022	Panorama	Father	Short
2022	Corsicana	Young Bass Reeves	
2022	Hip Hop Family Christmas Wedding	Vic Rhodes	TV movie

=== Television ===
Year	Title	Role	Notes
2013	Shameless	Prada Man	Episode: "Frank the Plumber"
2013	Comedy Bang! Bang!	NFL Player	Episode: "Jason Schwartzman Wears a Striped Shirt & High Top Sneakers"
2015	Born Again Virgin	Vince	Episode: "TMF"
2015	Being Mary Jane	Brandon "Cutty Buddy"	Recurring cast; 5 episodes
2016–2018	Luke Cage	Darius "Comanche" Jones	Recurring cast; 8 episodes
2018	Hawaii Five-O	Young Leroy Davis	Episode: "Aohe Mea Make I Ka Hewa; Make No I Ka Mihi Ole"
2018	Marlon	Demetrius	Episode: "Man Code"
2019	Tales	Jimmy	Episode: "Brothers"
2020	All American	Barry Lemming	Episode: "The Art of Peer Pressure"
2020	Bosch	Dante Crow	Episode: "Money, Honey"
2020–2022	P-Valley	Mane	Recurring cast; 6 episodes
2021	True Story	Detective Samuels	Episode: "Chapter 6: The Things You Do for Family"
2021–present	Johnson	Omar Johnson	Main cast; 40 episodes
