= Personal Jesus (Grey's Anatomy) =

- Grey's Anatomy episode
- Episode no.: Season 14; Episode 10
- Directed by: Kevin Rodney Sullivan
- Written by: Zoanne Clack
- Original air date: January 25, 2018
- Running time: 43 minutes

Guest appearances
- Matthew Morrison as Dr. Paul Stadler; Justin Bruening as Matthew Taylor; Joy Lenz as Jenny; Stefania Spampinato as Dr. Carina DeLuca; Kevin David Lin as David Roman; La Monde Byrd as Martin Sterling; Collette Wolfe as Karin Taylor; Michael Weaver as Greg; Santiago Segura as Chad

Episode chronology
| ← Previous "1-800-799-7233" | Next → "(Don't Fear) the Reaper" |
- Grey's Anatomy season 14

"Personal Jesus" is the tenth episode of the fourteenth season of the American medical drama television series Grey's Anatomy, and the 303rd episode overall. Written by former E.R. physician Zoanne Clack and directed by Kevin Rodney Sullivan, the episode aired on the American Broadcasting Company (ABC) in the United States on January 25, 2018.

The episode focuses on April Kepner, (Sarah Drew) who faces a crisis of faith after a traumatic event involving a young patient shakes her belief in God. Miranda Bailey (Chandra Wilson) struggles with her own health scare and experiences the medical system from the patient's perspective. Jo Wilson (Camilla Luddington) confronts her abusive ex-husband, Paul Stadler (Matthew Morrison), when he is admitted to the hospital. Additionally, Jackson Avery (Jesse Williams) grapples with an unexpected revelation about his family's history.

Upon its initial airing, "Personal Jesus" was viewed by 8.62 million Americans, an increase of 0.35 million from the previous episode, and garnered a season-best 2.3/9 Nielsen rating/share in the 18–49 demographic, ranking as the #2 drama of the week. The episode received critical acclaim from television critics, with high praise for the performances of Drew and Luddington and for its handling of socially relevant issues like domestic abuse and police brutality in the United States.

== Plot ==
The episode opens with a voice-over from April Kepner (Sarah Drew), questioning the value of faith when faced with suffering and whether devotion leads to reward or simply more pain.

Paul Stadler (Matthew Morrison) recovers from his hit and run injuries while Meredith Grey (Ellen Pompeo) questions the alibi provided by Alex Karev (Justin Chambers) and Jo Wilson (Camilla Luddington), suspecting Paul's fiancée, Jenny (Bethany Joy Lenz). Jo supports Jenny as she contemplates pressing domestic abuse charges against Paul. However, the police later reveal that the driver was a drunk driver who has been arrested. In a confrontation with Paul, Jo and Jenny plan to take him to court, but Paul falls, becomes brain dead, and Jo, as his legal wife, decides to take him off life support and donate his organs.

April Kepner (Sarah Drew) faces a difficult situation when her ex-fiancé, Matthew Taylor (Justin Bruening), brings in his pregnant wife. April helps deliver their baby and apologizes for her past actions, but realizes Matthew has moved on. Tragically, his wife suffers complications and dies in surgery. The loss, coupled with her other patients’ deaths, causes April to question her faith.

Meanwhile, Jackson Avery (Jesse Williams) and Miranda Bailey (Chandra Wilson) treat a 12-year-old boy shot by police in a case of racial profiling. Maggie Pierce (Kelly McCreary) organizes a science camp for Bailey’s son, Tucker (BJ Tanner), and his friends. The boy's death prompts Bailey and Ben Warren (Jason George) to have "the talk" with Tucker about racial profiling and police brutality.

== Production ==
The episode was written by Zoanne Clack and directed by Kevin Rodney Sullivan.

== Release ==
"Personal Jesus" aired on the American Broadcasting Company on January 25, 2018. Upon its initial release, the episode was viewed by 8.62 million people, marking an increase of 0.35 million from the previous episode, "1-800-799-7233", and achieving a season-best Nielsen rating. "Personal Jesus" was the second most-watched drama of the week and ranked seventh among the most-watched television programs overall. The 8.62 million viewers represented the largest audience for Grey's Anatomy in over a year.

== Reception ==
"Personal Jesus" received critical acclaim from television critics, with high praise for the performances of Sarah Drew (April Kepner) and Jo Wilson (Camilla Luddington) and for its handling of socially relevant issues like domestic abuse and police brutality in the United States.

Lacey Vorrasi-Banis of Entertainment Weekly praised April's character development in the episode, remarking that she "is in the darkest place we’ve ever seen her." She also appreciated the episode's title and its biblical inspiration in relation to April's storyline. Jasmine Blu of TVFanatic considered the episode one of the best Grey's Anatomy episodes in a long time, commending Drew's performance, noting that it gave Drew "the room to show off her range and excel." Maggie Fremont of Vulture echoed these sentiments, hoping that the episode and Drew's portrayal would shift viewers' perception of the character in a positive direction. Fremont also praised the return of Justin Bruening's character, Matthew Taylor, and the closure his storyline offered, while highlighting the exploration of April's "dark" side as a new and compelling direction for the show.
