= Retake (2016 film) =

2016 film

- Directed by: Nick Corporon
- Produced by: Nick Corporon, Collin Brazie, Sean Mandell
- Distributed by: Breaking Glass Pictures
- Release date: June 21, 2016
- Running time: 98 minute
- Country: United States
- Language: English

Retake is a 2016 American LGBT drama written and directed by Nick Corporon and starring Tuc Watkins and Devon Graye. It premiered at San Francisco's Frameline Film Festival in 2016 at the historic Castro theatre. The film went on to screen at multiple film festivals, including Reel Q, Outfest, and Reel Affirmations, among others. The film was picked up for distribution by Breaking Glass Pictures, with a theatrical premiere in Los Angeles on July 14, 2016 followed by an on-demand and DVD release in early-2017.

== Plot ==
The mysterious Jonathan (Tuc Watkins) travels to San Francisco and looks to hire a male escort. He initially hires Scotty (Kit Williamson), but it does not go well. He returns to the streets and finds an unnamed hustler (Devon Graye). After a night of sex and Polaroids, Jonathan offers to pay the escort to accompany him on a road trip to the Grand Canyon, no questions asked. Eager to leave his own life behind, the escort accepts and the two start out on a road trip through the American Southwest. Jonathan asks the hustler to go by the name “Brandon.” The two have an immediate connection, and Jonathan starts to have the escort wear specific clothes and put on specific attitudes. The escort investigates and finds a photo of someone named “Brandon” in Jonathan's shaving kit. Instead of leaving, he cuts his hair to match the photo. Their connection grows as they continue on their trip. “Brandon” pushes Jonathan to open up and have fun while Jonathan pushes him to continue playing the role. One night, Brandon is able to get Jonathan out of his shell by getting him to skinny dip in a hotel pool, where they are caught by an adventurous straight couple, James (Derek Phillips) and Iris (Sydelle Noel). Jonathan sneaks out of the hotel and listens to a mysterious tape of someone singing.

They continue their road trip and run into Iris and James again at a local bar. Brandon incorporates them into the evening and is able to get Jonathan to loosen up more, even dancing with Iris. On a drunken ride back to their motel, Brandon gets Jonathan to pull over and open up a bit. Instead of talking, they share a dance in front of headlights, where Jonathan talks about how he was always looking to the future, never to the present. Brandon feels for him, and they return to the motel.

The next morning, Jonathan is mugged outside of the hotel room and returns nursing a bruise. Brandon calms him down but feels something is off. He goes outside to check a packet of old Polaroids and finds out most of the trip — including the mugging — is all fake, a setup to relive a road trip with the real Brandon (Andrew Asper). The hustler confronts Jonathan about the whole thing being fake, even their natural chemistry. Jonathan reveals that Brandon died of an overdose on their road trip, and he's merely trying to relive it. Angered, he pays off the hustler who leaves.

Jonathan sadly goes through his old Polaroids of the original Brandon, his lover, and we see their original road trip from years prior. The hustler hitches a ride from a local woman, Debbie (Jody Jaress). In the motel room, Jonathan finishes listening to the old tape recorder — Brandon singing to him before he died. The hustler and Jonathan meet at a bar where Brandon tells his story and reveals he was kicked out of his house as a teen and started hustling because he didn't know what else to do. He laments that he doesn't know who he is or what he wants, but Jonathan does. They both agree to start over and the hustler reveals his name, Adam from Dayton, Ohio. They reconnect emotionally at the motel, staying up all night talking.

The next morning, Adam finds Jonathan gone with an envelope of money for a bus ride home. He goes to the bus station to buy a ticket back to Dayton as Jonathan finishes his drive to the Grand Canyon, alone but strengthened by his connection with Adam. He stares at the emptiness of the Grand Canyon and an uncertain future.

== Cast ==
- Tuc Watkins as Jonathan
- Devon Graye as Adam
- Derek Phillips as James
- Sydelle Noel as Iris
- Kit Williamson as Scotty
- Andrew Asper as Brandon
- Jody Jaress as Debbie

== Production ==
The script was written by Nick Corporon, who would also direct the film. This was Corporon's feature debut, having previously made LGBT-themed short films. The film was produced by Collin Brazie and Sean Mandell. Brazie was also the producer/cinematographer. Jenny Treadwell and Monica Kelly were casting directors. Composer Mike Meehan created the score.

Luke Pasqualino was originally cast as Adam before being replaced by Devon Graye. Corporon used a crowdfunding campaign through Kickstarter to help fund filming the movie. The film was shot in 16 days.

The film premiered at the Frameline Film Festival in 2016. It would go on to play at ImageOut, Reel Q, Seattle Twist, Reel Affirmations, and Outfest.

== Reception ==
Gary Goldstein of the LA Times wrote, “‘Retake’ intriguingly captures gay romance...” and “ A potentially precious and maudlin content gets an absorbing and intriguing treatment.” Keith Uhlich of The Hollywood Reporter wrote “it carves out distinctive new territory in the well-trod world of queer cinema.” Gary M Kramer of the SF Bay Times found the film “Palpable and heartbreaking." “Beautifully acted and directed with great sensitivity to the tortured souls trapped inside many gay men,” wrote George Heymont of the Huffington Post.
