= Jonathan Howard (actor) =

English actor

- Born: 17 November 1984 (age 41); Lancashire, United Kingdom
- Education: LAMDA
- Occupation: Actor
- Years active: 2001–present
- Children: 1
- Relatives: Peter Clarke (cousin)

External image
- Howard in Kingdom in 2016

Jonathan Howard (born 17 November 1984) is an English actor. He is known for his role in the series Dream Team as Gavin Moody and as Ian Boothby in Thor: The Dark World (2013). In Spring 2025 he joined the cast of the ITV soap Coronation Street as Carl Webster.

== Early and personal life ==
Howard was born in Lancashire, England and has lived in London since 2005. In August 2018, actress Élodie Yung gave birth to their daughter.

== Career ==
Howard started acting in 2001 with his first role in educational TV show for youths called Looking After the Penneys as Scott Penney. He was a part of the final cast between 2005 and 2007 of the TV series Dream Team, playing Gavin Moody, a young footballer. He then went to train at the prestigious London Academy of Music and Dramatic Art (LAMDA) between 2008 and 2011. In 2012, he was in the TV miniseries Titanic as Sixth Officer Moody. He appeared as Sam Thawley, a young, handsome bar patron, on Series 4 of Downton Abbey.

In 2013, he appeared in the zombie war film World War Z with Brad Pitt as one of Camp Humphrey's soldiers and in the Marvel Studios film Thor: The Dark World as Ian Boothby, Darcy's intern and love interest. The following year, he appeared in series 2 of the TV series Mr Selfridge as Ed and in several episodes of the sitcom Episodes.

== Filmography ==
Year	Title	Role	Notes
2001	Looking After the Penneys	Scott Penney	TV series (3 episodes)
2003	Girls in Love	Q.T. Boy	TV series (Episode: "Cuckoo in the Nest")
2004	Conviction	Barry Kearsley	TV series (Episode: "#1.1")
2005	Dream Team	Gavin Moody	TV series (50 episodes)
2007	Doctors	Luke Neville	TV series (Episode: "Just Deserts")
2008	Hollyoaks	PC Gary Hardy	TV series (Episode: "#1.2276")
2012	Titanic	Sixth Officer Moody	TV miniseries
2012	Holby City	Declan Ashe	TV series (Episode: "From Here to Maternity")
2013	World War Z	Camp Humphreys soldier	
2013	Downton Abbey	Sam Thawley	TV Series (Episode: "Episode 2")
2013	Thor: The Dark World	Ian Boothby	
2014	Mr Selfridge	Ed	TV series (4 episodes)
2014–2015	Episodes	Assistant Director	TV series (8 episodes)
2014	Dominion	Sgt. Ethan Mack	TV series (7 episodes)
2015	Night Fare	Chris	
2016	Kingdom	Will	TV series (7 episodes)
2017	Megan Leavey	Pete Walters	
2017	The Capture	Isaac	
2017	The Last Ship	James Fletcher	TV series (8 episodes)
2018	Hell Is Where the Home Is	Victor	Aka Trespassers
2019	Godzilla: King of the Monsters	Asher Jonah	
2020	Skylines	Leon	
2020	The Five Rules of Success	Danny	
2022	The Lair	Hook	
2025	Abraham's Boys	Arthur Holmwood	
2025–present	Coronation Street	Carl Webster	Regular Character
2026	The Dreadful	Brother Penros	Post-production
