= The Queen of Hollywood Blvd. =

- Directed by: Orson Oblowitz
- Written by: Orson Oblowitz
- Produced by: Matthew Berkowitz; Jeff Katz; Orson Oblowitz; Alec Paul; Gracie Wheelan
- Starring: Rosemary Hochschild; Ana Mulvoy-Ten; Ella Thomas; Jon Lindstrom; Michael Parks; Roger Guenveur Smith
- Cinematography: Luke Hanlein
- Music by: Daniel De Lara; Hermann Kopp
- Production companies: Concrete Images; Nero Films
- Distributed by: Dark Star Pictures
- Release date: January 31, 2020
- Running time: 90 minutes
- Country: United States
- Language: English

The Queen of Hollywood Blvd. is a 2020 American crime drama film written and directed by Orson Oblowitz and starring Rosemary Hochschild, Ana Mulvoy-Ten, Ella Thomas, Jon Lindstrom, Michael Parks and Roger Guenveur Smith.

== Cast ==
- Rosemary Hochschild as Queen Mary
- Roger Guenveur Smith as Duke
- Ana Mulvoy-Ten as Grace
- Michael Parks as Chet Fuller
- Ella Thomas as Josie
- Jon Lindstrom as The Snitch

== Release ==
The film was released on January 31, 2020.

== Reception ==
Frank Scheck of The Hollywood Reporter gave the film a positive review and wrote, "Really, though, it’s all an excuse to provide a starring showcase for Hochschild, and the actress seizes the role as if she’s been waiting all her life for it."

Noel Murray of the Los Angeles Times gave the film a mixed review and wrote, "The L.A. noir The Queen of Hollywood Blvd. justifies its existence with one remarkable scene."
