= Santiago Segura (American actor) =

American actor (born 1988)

- Born: Santiago Alejandro Segura; Washington, D.C., U.S.
- Occupation: Actor
- Years active: 2013–present

Santiago Alejandro Segura is an American actor. He is best known for his portrayal of Gustavo Acosta in the second season of the MTV slasher series Scream.

== Life and career ==
Segura is of Colombian heritage. He got his start working in television shows including The Middle, Silicon Valley and Faking It. In 2015, Segura was cast as Benjamin in the underwater survival thriller film 47 Meters Down which was released in theaters on June 16, 2017.

In 2016, Segura was cast in the series regular role of Gustavo Acosta on the second season of MTV's Scream.

== Filmography ==
=== Film ===
Year	Title	Role	Notes
2013	5th Street	Casto	
2015	My Date with Carmelo	Carmelo	Short film
2017	47 Meters Down	Benjamin	
2020	The Five Rules of Success	X	

=== Television ===
Year	Title	Role	Notes
2013	The Middle	Player #1	Episode: "Halloween IV: The Ghost Story"
2014	Delirium	Billy	TV movie
2015	Silicon Valley	Ramón	Episode: "Homicide"
2015	Hand of God	Frankie	Episode: "Welcome the Stranger"
2015	Faking It	Sam	Episode: "Faking It... Again"
2016	His Double Life	August	TV movie
2016	Scream	Gustavo Acosta	Main cast (season 2; 12 episodes)
2018	Grey's Anatomy	Chad	Episode: "Personal Jesus"
2018	MacGyver	Officer Enrique Cardoza	Episode: "Dia de Muertos + Sicarios + Family"
2021	Roswell, New Mexico	Manny Lopez	Episode: "Killing Me Softly with His Song"
2022	Walker: Independence	Luis Reyes	Recurring role
