= Bones (2010 film) =

- Directed by: Frank Pestarino
- Written by: Frank Pestarino
- Starring: Jimmy Bennett; Melissa Ordway; Zakk Wylde; Jonna Walsh; Jesse James
- Production companies: Broken, Beat & Scarred Productions
- Release date: March 31, 2010
- Running time: 88 minutes
- Country: United States
- Language: English

Bones is a 2010 independent drama film directed by Frank Pestarino and starring Jimmy Bennett, Melissa Ordway, Zakk Wylde, Jonna Walsh, and Jesse James. Filming began in Hawaiian Gardens.

== Production ==
The film is directed by Frank Pestarino. It was filmed in Hawaiian Gardens. It premiered on March 31, 2010.

== Cast ==
- Jimmy Bennett – Bones White
- Zakk Wylde – Jed, Bones' uncle
- Jonna Walsh – Kelly Reeves
- Melissa Ordway – Samantha Reeves
- Jesse James – Derrick Scott, Samantha's boyfriend
- Andrew Lawrence – Anthony
- Robin Thomas – Detective Pino
