= Nina Kaczorowski =

American actress, stunt woman, model and dancer

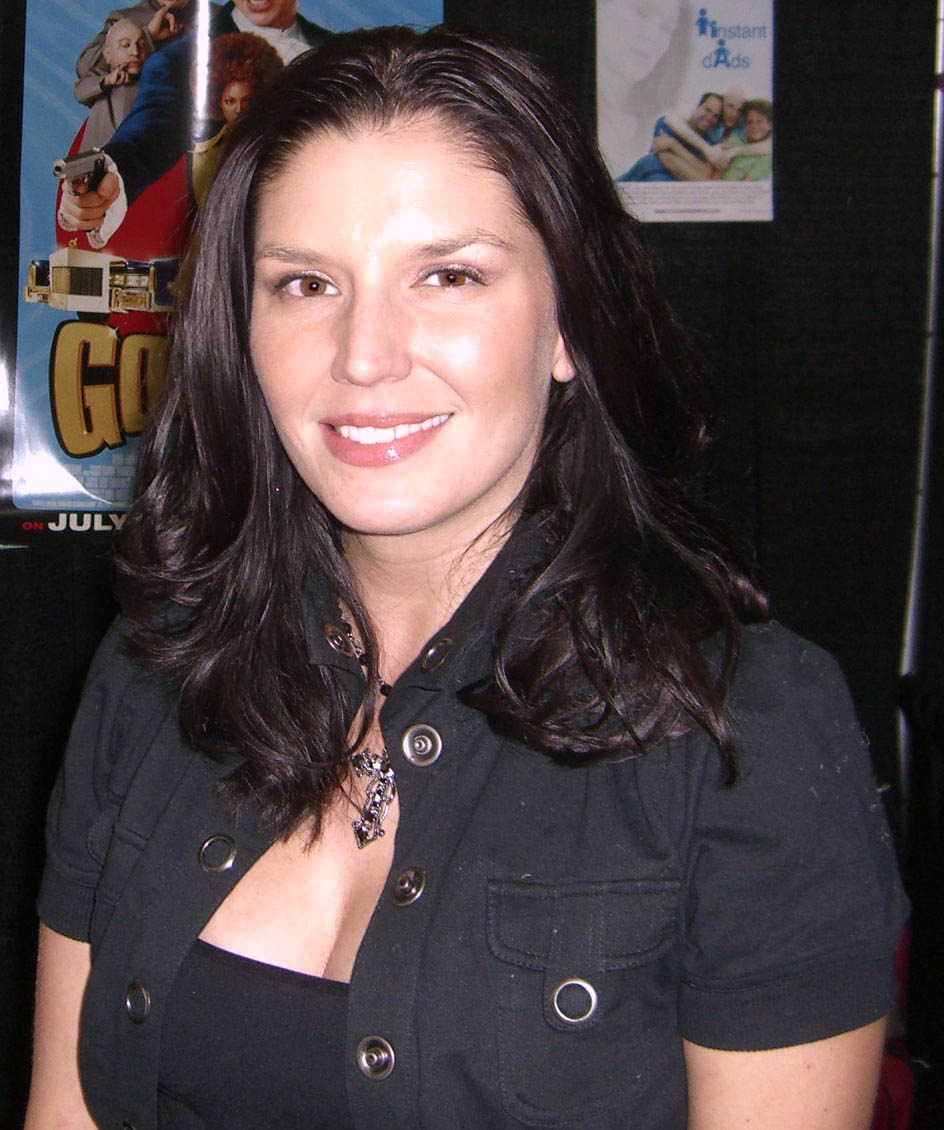
- Kaczorowski at the Big Apple Convention in Manhattan, October 18, 2009.
- Born: June 6, 1975 (age 51); New Jersey, U.S.
- Other name: Nina K
- Children: 1

Nina Kaczorowski (born June 6, 1975), also known as Nina K, is an American actress, stunt woman, model and dancer.

== Early life ==
Nina was born in New Jersey into a large family from Łódź, Poland. The family moved to Texas when she was six years old. Her upbringing was traditionally Polish. As a teenager, Nina started modeling in Houston and Dallas, and by age 19, she began learning to be a stunt artist.

== Career ==
Nina achieved early success in modelling and she moved to New York City as one of Wilhelmina's most sought-after models. Soon after her success in New York, Nina began booking national television commercials, and her acting coach encouraged her to move to Hollywood. She moved out West.

Soon after she arrival in Hollywood, Kaczorowski landed a role in Once Upon a Time in China and America with Jet Li, followed by a part opposite Billy Bob Thornton in Sam Raimi's A Simple Plan. She continued to act in films such as Tomcats, Pearl Harbor, Coyote Ugly, A.I. Artificial Intelligence, Minority Report (as the virtual reality girl), the SciFi flick, The Island and she also played a role in the television series Las Vegas (Season 3 "Like a Virgin"). She had minor, but critical, role in Two Tickets to Paradise (2006). Kaczorowski appeared in Austin Powers in Goldmember, where she played Goldmember's red-headed henchwoman.

== Filmography ==
=== Film ===
Year	Title	Role	Notes
1997	Once Upon a Time in China and America	Susan the Saloon Girl	Uncredited
1998	A Simple Plan	Bar Patron	
2001	Tomcats	Cheating Wife	
2001	Longshot	Bartender	Uncredited
2002	Minority Report	Virtual Girl	Uncredited
2002	Austin Powers in Goldmember	Henchwoman	
2003	The Rundown	Girlfriend	Uncredited
2004	Comic Book: The Movie	—N/a	Documentary
2005	Tennis, Anyone...?	Party guest #2	
2005	Choker	Nina, Woman in Motel	
2005	Instant Dads	Nancy	
2005	Homecoming	Joan Weston	
2006	Two Tickets to Paradise	Scarlett	
2007	June Cabin	Samantha	
2008	Rounds	Gloria Westcot	
2011	Exodus Fall	Lonnie	
2012	In Montauk	Julie 'Jules' Wagner	
2012	Delta Zulu	Sergeant Enyo	
2017	Miami Drive	Annelise Collins	
2023	Old Man Jackson	Asia	

=== Television ===
Year	Title	Role	Notes
2003	111 Gramercy Park	Helen	Television film
2006	Las Vegas	Hottie	Episode: "Like a Virgin"
2011–2012	The Journeys	Natalie / Valarie Rose	3 episodes
2012	Circle of Influence	Natalie Jennings	2 episodes
