= The Madness Inside Me =

2021 film directed by Matthew Berkowitz

- Theatrical release poster
- Directed by: Matthew Berkowitz
- Written by: Matthew Berkowitz
- Produced by: Matthew Berkowitz; Jennifer Gelfer; John Buffalo Mailer; Adam Moonves; Nancy Moonves; Martin Tuchman; Samantha Watkins
- Starring: Merrin Dungey; Devon Graye; Jennifer Gelfer; Scotty Tovar; Thomas Q. Jones
- Cinematography: Mattia Palombi
- Edited by: Matthew Berkowitz
- Music by: Peter G. Adams
- Production companies: Good Weird Films; Mailer Tuchman Media
- Distributed by: Gravitas Ventures
- Release date: September 3, 2021
- Running time: 89 minutes
- Country: United States
- Language: English

The Madness Inside Me is a 2021 American psychological thriller film written and directed by Matthew Berkowitz. Merrin Dungey stars as Madison Taylor, a forensic psychiatrist whose husband is killed during a home invasion by Francis Tate (Devon Graye). However, Taylor refuses to identify the murderer and instead stalks him as she contemplates her conflicted feelings about both her husband's death and his murderer. It premiered at the 2020 Oldenburg International Film Festival. The Madness Inside Me was later acquired by Gravitas Ventures and was released on digital platforms, Blu-ray, and DVD on September 3, 2021.

== Plot ==
Forensic psychiatrist Dr. Madison Taylor (Merrin Dungey), who works in the New York City prison system evaluating inmates for parole, is a witness to her husband Jeremy (Anthony DeSando) being assaulted by Francis Tate (Devon Graye) during a home invasion. In the struggle, Francis knocks Madison unconscious. When she wakes in the hospital, Detective Thompson (Thomas Q. Jones) reveals to her that her husband was murdered. Though Madison identifies Francis in a police lineup, she later testifies during his trial that he was not the killer.

In the aftermath of the trial, Madison is unable to sleep and begins to photograph strangers, places herself in increasingly dangerous situations, and ultimately starts to stalk Francis. After Jeremy's death, Madison's relationship with Jeremy's sister, Cynthia (Jennifer Gelfer), and her husband James (Brit Whittle) becomes strained. Madison attempts to understand the thrill that so many of the inmates that she had worked with felt with hunting their victims, and contemplates whether this was a buried aspect of her own personality. She continues working with incarcerated felons, including Eddie (Scotty Tovar), who was convicted of killing his father. Madison's self-destructive behavior leads her to meet Francis for coffee. Their encounter develops into a violent, sexual relationship as she tries to understand who Francis is and why he murdered her husband. She learns from Francis that he had broken into her apartment because he is a voyeur and that he did not intend to kill her husband.

== Cast ==
- Merrin Dungey as Madison Taylor
- Devon Graye as Francis Tate
- Jennifer Gelfer as Cynthia
- Scotty Tovar as Eddie
- Thomas Q. Jones as Detective Thompson
- Anthony DeSando as Jeremy
- Brit Whittle as James
- John Buffalo Mailer as Robert
- Nick Mathews as Robbie
- Samantha Watkins as Rebecca
- Jocelyn Jones as Mila
- Claudia Maree Mailer as Pamela
- Ciaran Byrne as Ian Kerns
- Danielle Guldin as Nicole

== Production ==
Writer/director Matthew Berkowitz originally pitched The Madness Inside Me in an earlier form before his directorial debut, Wild in Blue (2015), featuring a younger woman as the lead character but was not able to get the film made. After the release of Berkowitz's second film, A Violent Man (2017), he revisited the idea and wrote the screenplay with an older lead actress in mind. The mother of Matthew Berkowitz, the film's writer/director, is a psychologist and Berkowitz based some of the film on the concept of identity.

Principal photography took place over 18 days in New York City, and the prison scenes were shot at a prison in Queens. Shooting mostly took place at night utilizing a Red camera. Nancy Moonves and Martin Tuchman served as executive producers on the film.

== Release ==
The Madness Inside Me premiered at the Oldenburg International Film Festival on September 17, 2020. The It was released on VOD services (including Amazon, Google Play, iTunes, Microsoft Movies & TV, YouTube, and Vudu) and Blu-ray and DVD by Gravitas Ventures on September 3, 2021.

== Reception ==
=== Critical response ===
Anthony Francis of Screen Comment called The Madness Inside Me "Well-directed and extremely well-written" and wrote, "Berkowitz’s film swims in territories previously explored by filmmakers as varied as Brian De Palma, Roman Polanski, David Cronenberg, and Luis Buñuel." Writing for HorrorBuzz.com, Kyle Williams gave the film 9 out of 10, calling it "stunning in both its technical and creative achievements" and praised Berkowitz for "effectively crafting a thrilling, intriguing world full of engaging characters." Ben Bradley from Starburst gave the film 3 out of 5 stars and particularly praised the film's cinematography as "stunning" while adding that the film "doesn’t provide many answers but is an engaging watch nevertheless."
