= Jesse James (actor) =

American actor (born 1989)

- Born: September 14, 1989 (age 36); Palm Springs, California, U.S.
- Occupation: Actor
- Years active: 1997–2018

Jesse James (born September 14, 1989) is an American retired actor.

== Early life ==
James was born in Palm Springs, California, the son of Jaime, a laboratory technician, and Shane James, an actor.

== Career ==
James began his acting career in the 1997 film As Good as It Gets, a role for which he won the Hollywood Reporter Young Star award. His career continued with his role in the 2001 film Blow, as Young George Jung, and Pearl Harbor, in which he played the young version of Ben Affleck's character. James acted in the 2004 film The Butterfly Effect as the young Tommy Miller and The Amityville Horror. His television work includes Life and In Plain Sight, and he has become involved in the independent film community with projects such as Exodus Fall and Hickory Nation.

In 2008 James starred in and was an executive producer for the short film Manifest Destiny.

== Filmography ==
=== Film ===
- As Good as It Gets (1997) – Spencer Connelly
- Gods and Monsters (1998) – Michael Boone
- The Gingerbread Man (1998) – Jeff
- Puppies for Sale (1998) – Customer
- Sorrow's Child (1998) – Matt
- Message in a Bottle (1999) – Jason Osborne
- A Dog of Flanders (1999) – Young Nello
- Hanging Up (2000) – Jesse Marks
- Bailey's Mistake (2001, TV) – Dylan Donovan
- Blow (2001) – Young George Jung
- Pearl Harbor (2001) – Young Rafe McCawley
- Fear of the Dark (2002) – Ryan Billings
- Slap Her... She's French (2002) – Randolph Grady
- The Butterfly Effect (2004) – Tommy Miller at 13
- The Amityville Horror (2005) – Billy Lutz
- The Darkroom (2006) – J-Dawg
- The Flyboys (2008) – Jason McIntyre
- Jumper (2008) – young Mark Kobold
- Bones (2010) – Derrick Scott
- Exodus Fall (2010) – Kenneth Minor
- The Last Ride (2011) – Silas
- Hickory Nation (2012)
- Dead Souls (2012) – Johnny Petrie
- Wishin' and Hopin' (2014) – Chino
- The Lucky Man (2018) – Rev. Johnny Jones

=== Television ===
- Walker, Texas Ranger ("Last of The Breed", parts 1 and 2, 1997) – Jebb Wilson
- ER ("Good Luck, Ruth Johnson", 1998) – Wilson Geary
- The X-Files ("The Unnatural", 1999) – Poor boy
- The Wild Thornberrys ("Chimp Off the Old Block", 1999) – Gola
- Angel ("I've Got You Under My Skin", 2000) – Ryan
- Felicity ("Party Lines", 2000) – Stephen
- Chicago Hope ("Hopes of You", 2000) – Dustin Moss
- Family Law ("Celano v. Foster", 2002) – Jake Shaw
- Monk ("Mr. Monk and the Captain's Wife", 2004) – Jared Stottlemeyer
- Veronica Mars ("Papa's Cabin", 2007) – J.D. Sansone
- In Plain Sight ("A Stand-Up Triple", 2009) – Tripp Sullivan
- The Mentalist ("Red Menace", 2009) – Lucas Hodge
- Mad Men ("The Doorway", part 2, 2013) - Zal
