= Exodus Fall =

- Directed by: Ankush Kohli; Chad Waterhouse
- Written by: Chad Waterhouse
- Produced by: Michael Baumgarten; Ankush Kohli; Adriana LaCorte
- Starring: Rosanna Arquette; Jesse James; Devon Graye; Dee Wallace; Christopher Atkins
- Cinematography: Denis Maloney
- Edited by: Ankush Kohli; Mitchel Stanley
- Music by: Boris Zelkin
- Distributed by: Oakhurst Pictures
- Release date: April 22, 2011
- Country: United States
- Language: English

Exodus Fall is a 2011 American drama road film directed by Ankush Kohli and Chad Waterhouse, and starring Rosanna Arquette, Jesse James, Devon Graye, Dee Wallace, and Christopher Atkins.

== Plot ==
Set in 1974, the film centers on three siblings from Texas — Kenneth (Jesse James), Charlotte (Adrien Finkel), and Dana Minor (Devon Graye) — who are left living with their abusive, alcoholic mother Marilyn (Rosanna Arquette) after their father's death. Marilyn commits Dana, who is autistic, to an institution, allowing doctors to perform medical experiments on him. Kenneth and Charlotte break their younger brother out of the asylum, and the three siblings set out on a road trip, intending to travel from Texas to their grandmother's home in Oregon. They are joined by a hippie named Travis (Alexander Carroll).

== Cast ==
- Jesse James as Kenneth Minor
- Rosanna Arquette as Marilyn Minor
- Adrien Finkel as Charlotte Minor
- Devon Graye as Dana Minor
- Leo Rossi as Ford Ashworth
- Alexander Carroll as Travis Crawford
- Dee Wallace as Shirley Minor
- Christopher Atkins as Wayne Minor
- Duane Whitaker as Marty
- Nina Kaczorowski as Lonnie
