= It Came from the Sky =

1999 Canadian-American television film

- DVD cover
- Genre: family; Drama
- Written by: Jack Bender
- Directed by: Jack Bender
- Starring: John Ritter; JoBeth Williams; Kevin Zegers; Yasmine Bleeth; Christopher Lloyd
- Music by: Adam Gorgoni
- Country of origin: United States; Canada
- Original language: English

Production
- Producer: Ronna Slutske
- Cinematography: Thomas Del Ruth
- Editor: Mark Melnick
- Running time: 92 minutes
- Production company: Up on the Roof Productions

Original release
- Release: May 15, 1999

It Came from the Sky is a 1999 American-Canadian made-for-television drama film starring John Ritter, Yasmine Bleeth, Christopher Lloyd and JoBeth Williams.

== Plot ==
Donald Bridges and his wife Alice have a young son, Andy, who is emotionally disturbed due to a near-drowning accident. The parents frequently argue with each other about how to raise their son until they have uninvited houseguests when a plane carrying Jarvis Moody and Pepper Upper falls from the sky and crashes right onto their roof.

Jarvis and Pepper are a pair of wealthy eccentrics who give Donald and Alice a lesson in how to enjoy life. The stranded couple force the stressed parents to cope with each other and with their son. Then Andy asks through his artwork to be taken to a special school for children with his type of disorder. All of their lives are changed forever in this warm, offbeat fairytale.

== Cast ==
- John Ritter as Donald Bridges
- JoBeth Williams as Alice Bridges
- Kevin Zegers as Andy Bridges
- Yasmine Bleeth as Pepper Upper
- Christopher Lloyd as Jarvis Moody
- Christian Dabe as Young Andy Bridges
- Jonathan Ginsberg as Tony (Limo Driver)
