= The Sopranos: Road to Respect =

2006 video game

- North American cover art
- Developer: 7 Studios
- Publisher: THQ
- Director: Douglas Carrigan
- Producer: Mo Davoudian
- Writers: Allen Rucker; Paul Golding
- Composer: Victor Rodriguez
- Platform: PlayStation 2
- Release: NA: November 9, 2006; EU: November 17, 2006; AU: November 23, 2006
- Genres: Action-adventure, beat 'em up
- Mode: Single-player

The Sopranos: Road to Respect is a 2006 video game by American developer 7 Studios based on the HBO series The Sopranos (1999–2007). The game's storyline takes place between the fifth and sixth seasons and centers on an original character, Salvatore "Big Pussy" Bonpensiero's illegitimate son Joey LaRocca, as he works his way up the fictional DiMeo crime family under Tony Soprano.

Road to Respect was published by THQ for the PlayStation 2; a version for the Xbox 360 was set for release, but was canceled. The game received mostly negative reviews.

== Gameplay ==
The player is able to take missions from the main characters of the series at certain points in the game. Road to Respect differs from other mob-influenced games in that it is a linear, story-driven action game as opposed to Grand Theft Auto's open-world type gameplay. Players are able to play Texas Hold 'Em with members of the family and visit the Bada Bing! but otherwise have no other side activities to participate in. The game focuses almost exclusively on the Mafia aspect of The Sopranos as opposed to the series' focus on both life in and outside the criminal world.

== Story ==
The game begins with Tony Soprano offering Salvatore "Big Pussy" Bonpensiero's son Joey LaRocca (the player character) a place in the Mafia after discovering that he's become a petty thief and punk. While dealing with a rude customer, Joey accidentally bludgeons the man to death and has to hastily dispose of the body with fellow associate Reggie. The victim turns out to be Mario Buscetta, nephew of Angelo "Angie" Buscetta, the boss of the Philadelphia mob. Angie orders his bodyguard to whack Joey, but the latter manages to overpower and kill the assassin. However, Tony insists that Angie have some form of satisfaction, so Joey, against his wishes, is forced to whack Reggie at his apartment.

Joey going to talk to Paulie at Satriale's

A few days later, Tony's son A.J. has a drug deal go bad on him; his partner wasted the drug money, prompting the black dealers to kill his partner and steal his dad's car. Joey, who had agreed to keep an eye on AJ, retrieves the car and kills one of the dealers, only to have the car stolen by Angie's men. While Joey is fearful that the theft of Tony's truck may get him whacked, Tony says that A.J. admitted responsibility. Tony has Joey retaliate for the theft by burning down one of Angie's businesses, a porn studio run by his brother Dino.

Angie then returns Tony's car, completely wrecked, and containing Joey's girlfriend, Trichelle, beaten and raped. Joey then tracks down Angie and throws him off his yacht at the docks to drown.

Through various intervals in the game, Joey is visited by the ghost of his dead father Salvatore, who warns him about some of the trouble ahead. Impressed by Joey's commitment, Tony gives him permission to become a made man. Just before the ceremony, Joey is visited one last time by Salvatore, who simply tells him not to make the same mistakes he did in life.

An alternative ending is unlocked should Joey lose all of his respect; the game has a brief scene of him on a boat with Tony and Paulie, asking if "he can keep his eyes".

== Cast ==
Cast members who reprised their roles from the show include James Gandolfini as Tony Soprano, Michael Imperioli as Christopher Moltisanti, Steven Van Zandt as Silvio Dante, Tony Sirico as Paulie "Walnuts" Gualtieri, Joseph Gannascoli as Vito Spatafore, Vincent Pastore as Salvatore "Big Pussy" Bonpensiero, and Robert Iler as Anthony "A.J." Soprano Jr. The main character, Joey LaRocca, is voiced by Christian Maelen.

Other cast members include Monica Keena as Joey's girlfriend Trishelle and Robert Costanzo as Angelo Buscetta of the Philadelphia mob. Anthony DeSando, who played Brendan Filone on the series, voices an entirely new character as LaRocca's friend and associate, Reggie.

== Development ==
The concept for the game originated from an idea that Sopranos creator David Chase had years earlier in his writing career. Chase described the original idea as "an action/comedy about a regular Joe from nowhere who decides he wants to be in the Mafia and how you go about joining." Despite the connection to his original idea, Chase maintained that it wasn't his idea to develop a Sopranos video game and that HBO executives spearheaded the project. Chase did however oversee Alan Rucker's script for the game to ensure "the characters were true to the characters."

In an interview with MTV around the time of the game's release, Chase insisted that Road to Respect had little to no connection to the show: "It wasn't my idea to do a game [...] What I didn't want to have happen was that the game and the show bleed together, that any of the stuff in [the show's] story arcs [...] was in the game or had anything to do with the game."

Many actors from the show reprised their roles for the game, lending their voices and likenesses. Christian Maelen, who voiced the new player character Joey LaRocca, was reportedly Chase's second choice to play Christopher Moltisanti.

=== Making-of documentary ===
HBO: The Making of 'The Sopranos: Road to Respect' is a behind-the-scenes documentary that aired on HBO in 2006; the hour-long special includes previews of Road to Respect, cast and crew interviews, and footage of actors recording their parts for the game.

== Reception ==
Reception

Aggregate score
Aggregator	Score
Metacritic	42/100

Review scores
Publication	Score
Eurogamer	3/10
Game Informer	6/10
GameSpot	4.2/10
GamesRadar+	2.5/5
GameTrailers	4.4/10
GameZone	4/10
IGN	4.5/10; 3/10 (UK)
VideoGamer.com	3/10
X-Play	2/5
Detroit Free Press	1/4

The game received "generally unfavorable" reviews according to review aggregator Metacritic. The game received poor reviews from gaming websites like GameSpot and IGN, which complained of overly simplistic gameplay, a small and linear game world with little ability to explore, blocky graphics, marginal game mechanics, and various clipping and collision detection bugs. The voice acting contributed by Sopranos cast members received praise.
