= Hell Is Where the Home Is =

2018 American horror film

Trespassers
- Official poster
- Directed by: Orson Oblowitz
- Written by: Corey Deshon
- Produced by: Julio Hallivis; Diego Hallivis
- Starring: Angela Trimbur; Janel Parrish; Jonathan Howard; Zach Avery; Fairuza Balk
- Cinematography: Noah Rosenthal
- Edited by: Brett Solem
- Music by: Jonathan Snipes
- Production companies: 1inMM Productions; Hallivis Brothers Productions
- Release date: August 26, 2018 (London FrightFest)
- Running time: 88 minutes
- Country: United States
- Language: English

Hell Is Where the Home Is, also known as Trespassers, is a 2018 American home invasion horror film directed by Orson Oblowitz. The film stars Angela Trimbur, Janel Parrish, Jonathan Howard, Zach Avery, and Fairuza Balk.

== Plot ==
Two couples rent a luxury home in the desert to get away from it all and enjoy a fun weekend together - Sarah and Joseph are in a long-term relationship dealing with loss of their baby. Estelle and Victor are in a newer relationship which he clearly dominates much to the chagrin of Sarah. The two women reconnect after admitting they could have tried harder to keep in touch.

On the second night a mysterious woman knocks on the door claiming to be a neighbour, who knows the house owners and asks to use the phone as she is having car trouble. Sarah wants to allow her in but Victor protests. Eventually they allow her in to make a call and she claims to have called home to assure the babysitter and her son she is safe. After offering Sarah and Joseph unwanted advice, she heads back to call a tow truck.

After a while with the woman still in the house and her car not being on the side of the road any longer along with Estelle catching her out as not knowing the home owners, Victor decides to kick her out. She refuses to leave and demands some water and heads to the kitchen. Sarah calls the police as Victor grabs the stranger and demands she leave as Estelle tries to calm him. The three struggle until the woman slips and falls onto the counter top. The stem of a glass pierces her eyeball and she falls back dead.

Panicked Victor finds a gun on the strange womans body and turns on his friends. He forces Joseph to help him clean up the blood soaked kitchen, Estelle joins them and when Victor is out of earshot she tells Joseph that her boyfriend is violent and that when he finds out the truth he will be enraged indicating the two have a secret.

Later they decide to be honest so Joseph and Estelle confess the affair and as warned Victor becomes violent, he attacks Estelle and in defense she stabs him with a knife just as the lights go out. Victor points the gun at her head but drops it just as the police knock on the front door.

Joseph carries Victor away keeping his wailing quiet as Sarah and Estelle talk to the suspicious police officers. They make up a story that the woman left the house after the scuffle but the officer reveals the car is parked outside the house. Just then a masked man stabs one of the officers in the face. As he falls his gun falls and Sarah grabs it, as Joseph struggles to keep the man out Sarah shoots him in the elbow and he flees.

The second officer takes control, takes the gun away from Sarah and says he is going to secure the property. He leaves and moments later a second masked man breaks down a door and drags Joseph outside and begins beating him as Sarah and Estelle flee.

Joseph and the second man fight and Joseph eventually drowns him in a pool but he is stabbed in the gut and left to bleed out. Estelle and Sarah lock themselves in a bedroom and find Victor's dead body. The two decides to make a break for freedom but split up when attacked - Sarah manages to reach her car but is attacked and subdued by the first killer as Estelle is stopped by a third man, as she turns to run the police officer from earlier knocks her out.

Sarah and Estelle wake up bound to chairs surrounded by the two masked men and the police officer who seems to be in charge. He demands to know where some pictures are to which they say they know nothing about. The man explains that they do this regularly out of enjoyment but the last couple they killed has managed to take incriminating pictures they want back.

The police officer and one of the men torture the women, eventually Sarah says she knows where the pictures are and will show them. She is untied and the police officer tells Estelle she is no longer needed and the two masked men bash her skull in, killing her.

Sarah leads the man to a dark room and begins developing a picture but suddenly throws the developing solution in his face blinding him, he begins screaming and shoots wildly and ends up shooting one of the masked men in the eye. Sarah then attacks the blinded man and crushes his face with a camera tripod.

Sarah once again makes a run for it but the last killer is waiting outside, just as he attacks her he is shot in the head and Joseph is revealed. Sarah goes to him but Joseph dies in her arms.

The movie ends as Sarah walks down a desert road traumatized.

== Cast ==
- Angela Trimbur as Sarah
- Janel Parrish as Estelle
- Jonathan Howard as Victor
- Zach Avery as Joseph
- Fairuza Balk as The Visitor
- Carlo Rota as Sergeant Daniels

== Production ==
Principal photography began in Malibu, California in August 2017.

== Release ==
The film had its world premiere at the London FrightFest Film Festival on August 26, 2018.
