= Showdown at the Grand =

2023 film by Orson Oblowitz

- Theatrical release poster
- Directed by: Orson Oblowitz
- Written by: Orson Oblowitz
- Produced by: Christian de Gallegos; Mira Pak Howard; Michael Benaroya
- Starring: Terrence Howard; John Savage; Piper Curda; Amanda Righetti; Dolph Lundgren
- Cinematography: Noah Rosenthal
- Edited by: Brett Solem
- Music by: Daniel De Lara
- Production companies: Christian de Gallegos Films; Benaroya Pictures
- Distributed by: Shout! Studios
- Release date: November 10, 2023
- Running time: 92 minutes
- Country: United States
- Language: English
- Budget: $1.7 million

Showdown at the Grand is a 2023 American action comedy film written and directed by Orson Oblowitz and starring Terrence Howard, John Savage, Piper Curda, Amanda Righetti and Dolph Lundgren. It was released in the United States on November 10, 2023.

== Cast ==
- Terrence Howard as George Fuller
- Dolph Lundgren as Claude Luc Hallyday
- Amanda Righetti as Lynn
- John Savage as "Lucky"
- Piper Curda as "Spike"
- Mike Ferguson as Reed
- Jon Sklaroff as Burton

== Production ==
Written and directed by Orson Oblowitz, the film was shot in Los Angeles on a $1.7 million budget. Christian de Gallegos, Mira Pak Howard and Michael Benaroya produced. Terrence Howard, John Savage, Amanda Righetti, Piper Curda, Jon Sklaroff and Mike Ferguson were cast in lead roles.

== Release ==
In November 2022, it was announced that Shout! Studios acquired North American distribution rights to the film, which was then titled Showdown at the Odessa. It was released in limited theaters and through VOD on November 10, 2023. The film had a screening in Memphis, Tennessee on November 8, 2023, in which Howard served as a host.

== Reception ==
On the review aggregator website Rotten Tomatoes, 100% of 6 critics' reviews are positive, with an average rating of 6.5/10.
