= Kevin Zegers =

Canadian actor (born 1984)

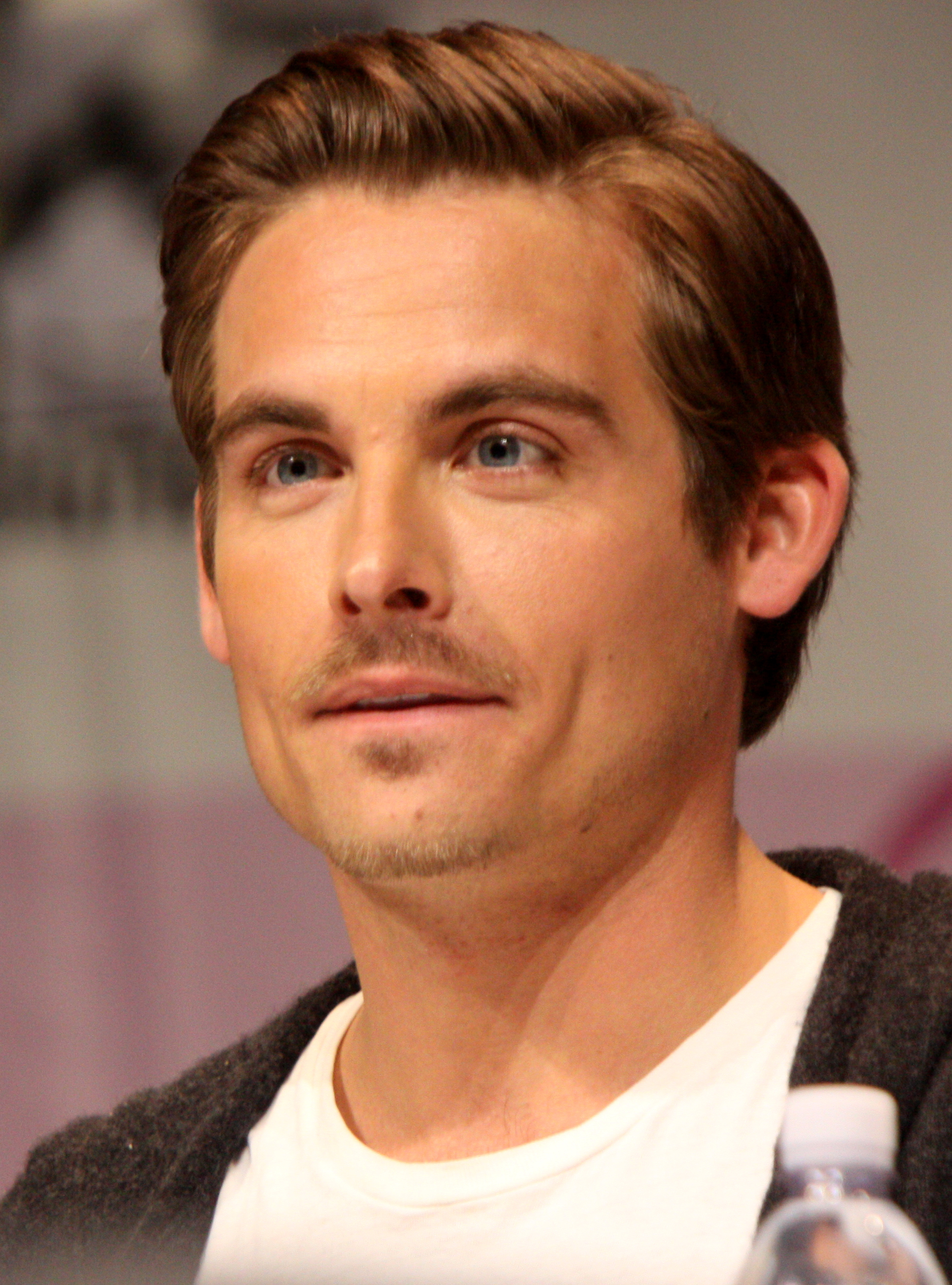
- Zegers at the 2013 WonderCon
- Born: September 19, 1984 (age 42); Woodstock, Ontario, Canada
- Occupation: Actor
- Years active: 1992–present
- Spouse: Jaime Feld (m. 2013)
- Children: 2

Kevin Zegers (born September 19, 1984) is a Canadian actor. He is known for his roles as Josh Framm in the Air Bud film series, Toby Osbourne in Transamerica (2005), Damien Dalgaard in the CW teen drama Gossip Girl, and as rookie FBI Agent Brendon Acres on the ABC crime drama The Rookie: Feds. He has also starred in the films Dawn of the Dead (2004), It's a Boy Girl Thing (2006), The Jane Austen Book Club (2007), Fifty Dead Men Walking (2008), Frozen (2010), The Mortal Instruments: City of Bones, and Nighthawks (2019).

== Early life ==
Zegers was born in Woodstock, Ontario, the son of Mary-Ellen (née Veldman), a teacher, and Jim Zegers, a quarry worker. He has two sisters, Krista and Katie. (The latter is also an actress; she appeared with him in John Carpenter's In the Mouth of Madness). He is of Dutch descent; all four of his grandparents were born in the Netherlands. He attended St Mary's Catholic High School in Woodstock.

Zegers is active in sports, especially basketball, ice hockey, and golf. He played on the Hollywood Knights celebrity basketball team, raising money for local Los Angeles schools.

== Career ==
=== Early work ===
Zegers began his performing career at the age of six, appearing in about 30 TV commercials. His first film role was at the age of seven, in a small part in the Michael J. Fox comedy Life with Mikey (1993), playing a younger version of Fox's character. Subsequently, he made a guest appearance on the acclaimed science fiction series The X-Files, playing a stigmatic child, Kevin Kryder, in the 1995 episode "Revelations," and had a recurring role on the Canadian TV series Traders (1996). During this time, he appeared in several made-for-television films, including Thicker Than Blood: The Larry McLinden Story, The Silence of Adultery, and Rose Hill, and as Noah Thompson in the "Let's Get Invisible!" episode of Goosebumps.

His career received a major boost when he won the role of Josh Framm in Air Bud (1997), a film about a lonely boy who befriends a basketball-playing dog. Air Bud launched a franchise, with four sequels. Zegers appeared in four of the films, as well as a similar title, MVP: Most Valuable Primate (2000), which featured a hockey-playing chimp.

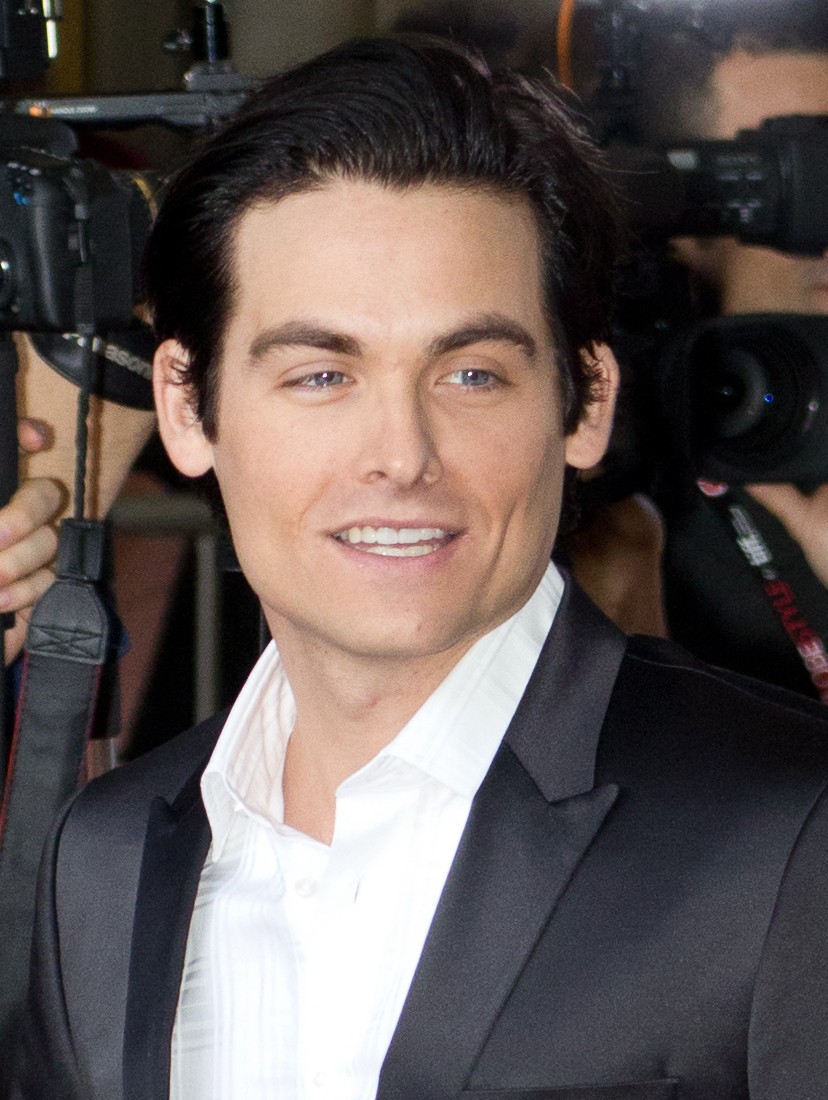
Zegers at the 2012 Toronto International Film Festival

Around that time, he starred in other family-friendly fare, including A Call To Remember (1997) with Joe Mantegna, Nico the Unicorn (1998) with Elisha Cuthbert, Treasure Island (1999) with Jack Palance, and Time Share (2000) with Nastassja Kinski. He also played a boy who discovers he is a clone in the TV series So Weird (1999). While also headlining numerous family/animal films, between 1997 and 2004, Zegers had starring or costarring roles in many low-budget horror films, often Canadian, including Shadow Builder, Komodo (1999), Wrong Turn (2003), and Fear of the Dark and The Hollow (both 2004).

In Four Days (1999), Zegers played a nameless boy devoted to his bank-robber father. He also appeared in the short-lived American television series for NBC and Spelling Television Titans (2000), opposite Yasmine Bleeth, for which he was chosen by producer Aaron Spelling. It was his first regular television series role. Zegers had previously worked with Bleeth in the 1999 film It Came from the Sky, where he played a mentally disabled child visited by an angel-like couple. He co-starred with Harry Hamlin in Sex, Lies & Obsession (2001), a Lifetime Network film about sex addiction, and with Gena Rowlands and James Caan in The Incredible Mrs. Ritchie (2003), a television film drama that won three Daytime Emmy awards: Outstanding Children/Youth/Family Special, Outstanding Performer (Rowlands), and Outstanding Writing.

In the summer of 2003, he filmed the drama Some Things That Stay at the same time as the remake of Dawn of the Dead, shuttling across Canada between sets. Around this time, he also continued his television work, appearing on Smallville in 2003 and House in 2004.

=== 2005–present ===
In 2005, he had a major role in the Academy Award-nominated independent film Transamerica, co-starring Felicity Huffman. Zegers' performance as Toby Osbourne, the street-hustling bisexual son of a trans woman (Huffman) was praised by several critics, and he won the Trophée Chopard for Male Revelation at the 2006 Cannes Film Festival. Director Duncan Tucker said he had to overcome his initial wariness over Zegers' good looks before casting him for the role. Variety's reviewer wrote that "Zegers... finds multiple dimensions in pic's potentially most clichéd character...," and The Hollywood Reporter's critic said, "As a boy who considers sex his chief talent, Zegers... conveys Toby's essential sweetness and hunger for real affection, making him much more than just a vain or damaged kid."

Also in 2005, he appeared with Shailene Woodley in Felicity: An American Girl Adventure, a television film set in Williamsburg, Virginia, in 1775, based on the American Girl book series. He played 15-year-old Benjamin "Ben" Davidson, an apprentice at a shop owned by Felicity's father. In 2006, Zegers played supervillain Concussion in the comedy Zoom, with Tim Allen, and had the lead role opposite Samaire Armstrong in the romantic comedy It's a Boy Girl Thing. He guest-starred as Damien Dalgaard in Gossip Girl from 2009 until 2010, and returned again in late 2010 for multiple episodes throughout season 4. He appeared in Rock Mafia's 2010 music video "The Big Bang", and in 2012, played the male protagonist in the television series Titanic: Blood and Steel.

Zegers portrayed Alec Lightwood in The Mortal Instruments: City of Bones (2013). He joined the cast of Fear the Walking Dead for the series' fourth season.

== Personal life ==
In August 2013, Zegers married Jaime Feld, a talent agent. The couple had twin girls in August 2015.

In October 2024, Zegers announced he had converted to Judaism.

== Filmography ==
=== Film ===
Year	Title	Role	Notes
1993	Life with Mikey	Little Mikey Chapman	
1994	In the Mouth of Madness	Kid	Appeared with his real-life sister Katie
1996	Specimen	Bart	
1997	Air Bud	Josh Framm	
1998	Shadow Builder	Chris Hatcher	
1998	Air Bud: Golden Receiver	Josh Framm	
1998	Nico the Unicorn	Billy Hastings	
1999	Treasure Island	Jim Hawkins	
1999	Four Days	Simon	
1999	Komodo	Patrick Connally	
2000	The Acting Class	Lou Carpman	
2000	Air Bud: World Pup	Josh Framm	
2000	MVP: Most Valuable Primate	Steven Westover	
2002	Virginia's Run	Darrow Raines	
2002	Air Bud: Seventh Inning Fetch	Josh Framm	
2003	Wrong Turn	Evan	
2003	Fear of the Dark	Dale Billings	
2003	The Incredible Mrs. Ritchie	Charlie Proud	
2004	Dawn of the Dead	Terry	
2004	The Hollow	Ian Cranston	
2004	Some Things That Stay	Rusty Murphy	
2005	Transamerica	Toby Wilkins	
2006	Zoom	Connor Shepard / Concussion	
2006	It's a Boy Girl Thing	Woody Deane/Nell Bedworth	
2007	The Jane Austen Book Club	Trey	
2007	Normal	Jordie	
2007	The Stone Angel	John Shipley	
2008	Gardens of the Night	Frank	
2008	The Narrows	Mike Manadoro	
2008	Fifty Dead Men Walking	Sean	
2009	The Perfect Age of Rock 'n' Roll	Spyder	
2010	Frozen	Dan Walker	
2011	Vampire	Simon	
2011	Girl Walks into a Bar	Billy	
2011	The Entitled	Paul Dynan	
2013	The Colony	Sam	
2013	The Mortal Instruments: City of Bones	Alec Lightwood	
2013	All the Wrong Reasons	Simon Brunson	
2015	The Curse of Downers Grove	Chuck	
2017	Aftermath	John Gullick	
2017	Another Kind of Wedding	Kurt	
2019	Nighthawks	Chad	
2022	Corrective Measures	Captain Jason Brody	

=== Television ===
Year	Title	Role	Notes
1992	Street Legal	Jeremy Morris	Episode: "It's a Wise Child"
1993 & 1994	Tales from the Cryptkeeper	6X (voice)/Jeremy (voice)	Episodes: "Grounds for Horror" & "Uncle Harry's Horrible House of Horrors"
1994-1997	The Magic School Bus	Mikey Ramon	Voice role, 2 episodes
1994	Free Willy	Einstein (voice)	Episode: "Cry of the Dolphin"
1994	Thicker Than Blood: The Larry McLinden Story	Larry McLinden in 1954	Television film
1995	Road to Avonlea	Gordon Bradley	Episode: "A Time to Every Purpose"
1995	The X-Files	Kevin Kryder	Episode: "Revelations"
1995	The Silence of Adultery	Steven Harlett	Television film
1996	Goosebumps	Noah Thompson	Episode: "Let's Get Invisible!"
1996	The Cold Heart of a Killer	Matthew Arnold	Television film
1996–1997	Traders	Sean Blake	Recurring role (seasons 2 & 3), 7 episodes
1997	Rose Hill	Cole Clayborne at 13	Television film
1997	A Call to Remember	Ben Tobias	Television film
1999	Twice in a Lifetime	Young Flash Jericho	Episode: "Blood Brothers"
1999	So Weird	Ryan Ollman	Episode: "Second Generation"
1999	It Came from the Sky	Andy Bridges	Television film
2000	Time Share	Thomas Weiland	Television film
2000–2001	Titans	Ethan Benchley	Main role
2001	Sex, Lies & Obsession	Josh Thomas	Television film
2003	Smallville	Seth Nelson	Episode: "Magnetic"
2004	House	Brandon Merrell	Episode: "Occam's Razor"
2005	Felicity: An American Girl Adventure	Benjamin "Ben" Davidson	Television film
2009–2011	Gossip Girl	Damien Dalgaard	Recurring role (seasons 3–4), 10 episodes
2012	Titanic: Blood and Steel	Mark Muir	Main role
2014	Gracepoint	Owen Burke	Main role
2016	Notorious	Oscar Keaton	Main role
2018	Dirty John	Toby Sellers	Recurring role
2018	Fear the Walking Dead	Melvin	Recurring role (season 4), 6 episodes
2019	Hell's Kitchen	Himself	Represented St. Jude Children's Research Hospital at a private dinner service; episode: "Poor Trev"
2019	What Just Happened??! with Fred Savage	Himself	Episode: "Flaremenon"
2021	Rebel	Nate	Main role
2022–2023	The Rookie: Feds	Brendon Acres	Main role
2024	Doctor Odyssey	Bennet	Episode "I Always Cry at Weddings" (S1.E6)
2025	The Rookie	Brendan Acres	Recurring role (seasons 5-7), 5 episodes
2026	The Madison	Cade Harris	Main Role
2027	Heated Rivalry	Coach Brandon Wiebe	(filming as of late 2026)

=== Music video ===
Year	Title	Artist
2010	"The Big Bang"	Rock Mafia

== Awards ==
Year	Award	Category	Work	Result
1998	Young Artist Award	Best Performance in a Feature Film: Leading Young Actor	Air Bud	Won
1998	Young Artist Award	Best Performance in a TV Movie/Pilot/Mini-Series: Supporting Young Actor	A Call to Remember	Nominated
1998	Young Artist Award	Best Performance in a TV Movie or Feature Film: Young Ensemble	Rose Hill	Nominated
1998	YoungStar Award	Best Young Actor in a Comedy Film	Air Bud	Nominated
1999	Young Artist Award	Best Performance in a Feature Film: Leading Young Actor	Air Bud: Golden Receiver	Nominated
2001	Young Artist Award	Best Performance in a Feature Film: Leading Young Actor	MVP: Most Valuable Primate	Nominated
2006	Cannes Film Festival	Trophée Chopard – Male Revelation	Transamerica	Won
