= Chris Pardal =

American actor, producer and writer (born 1972)

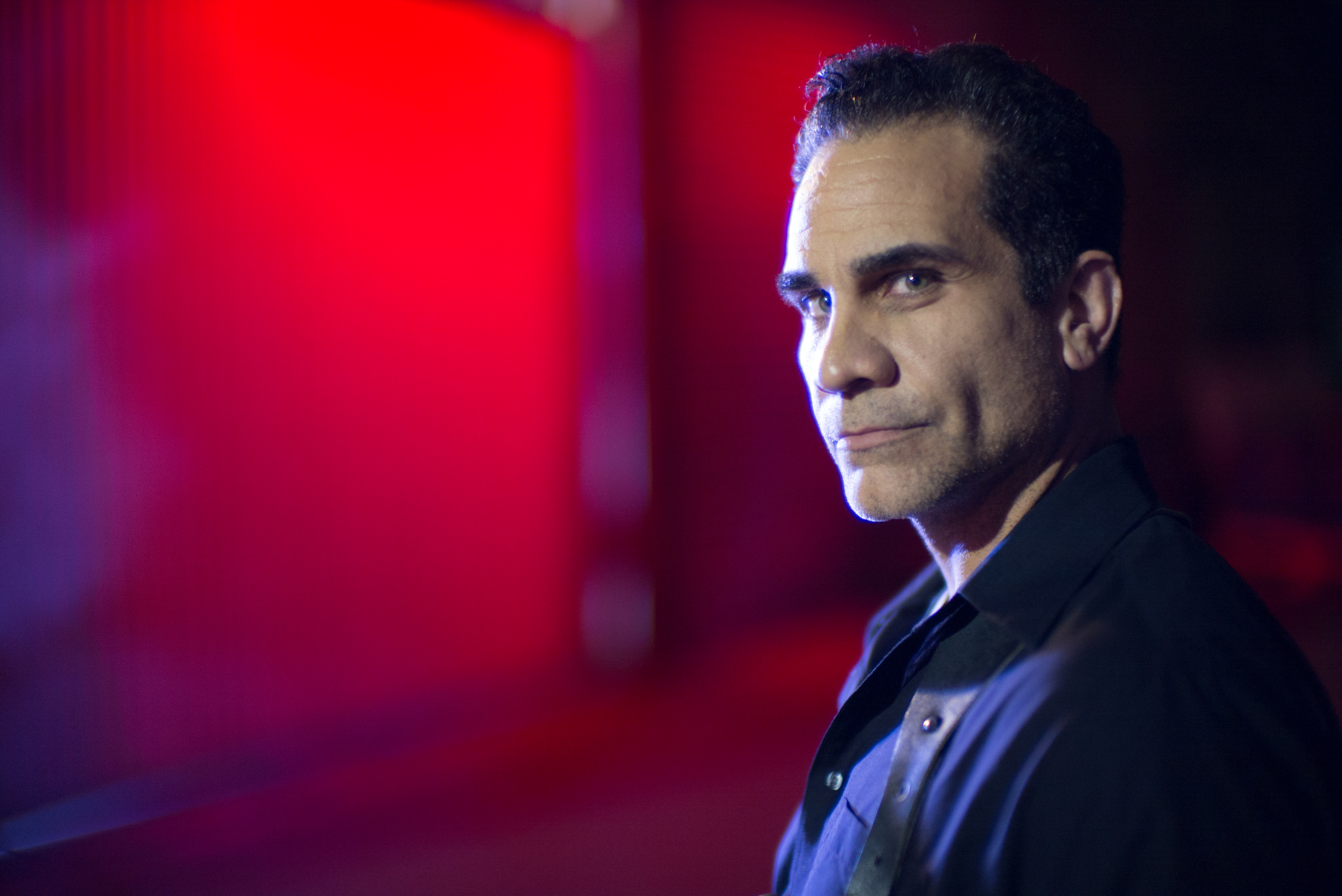
- Pardal in 2020
- Born: September 30, 1972 (age 53); Bridgeport, Connecticut, U.S
- Education: Saint Petersburg College
- Occupations: Actor, writer, producer
- Years active: 2009-present
- Notable work: Corbin Nash, Zeroville, Sector 4: Extraction

Christopher Matthew Pardal (born September 30, 1972) is an American actor, producer and writer.

== Early life and education ==
Chris Pardal was born at St. Vincent's Medical Center in Bridgeport, Connecticut, to Armando Pardal (musician, behavior specialist) and Patricia Trentalange.

In 1986 when he was 14, Pardal was expelled from Northeast Middle School and placed in an alternative school in Bristol, Connecticut, which was highly experimental at the time.

On April 4, 1988, Pardal moved to St. Petersburg, Florida, to live with his father.

After being expelled from high school in 1990, Pardal became a professional hip-hop dancer and a "house" dancer for clubs in the Tampa Bay area. He also danced with "Todd Heffner & Company" and in several Florida hip-hop groups. He toured in Connecticut, New York, Florida, Cincinnati and Cleveland.

Pardal auditioned for the play The Water Engine by David Mamet in 1995 at St. Petersburg College and was cast as Lawrence Oberman. He began pursuing an education in theater and was quickly recruited into the dance departments of St. Petersburg College and the University of South Florida. His choreographers have included Debra Jo Hughes, Katurah Robinson, John Parks, Colette Harding and Klaus "Step" Reinert. While in college performing musical theater, he was then recruited back into the drama department where he began acting and writing again.

Pardal also served in the Army Reserves and the Florida Army National Guard from 1991 to 1996 and received the Army Commendation Medal after his unit (53rd Infantry Brigade Combat Team) was activated during Hurricane Andrew.

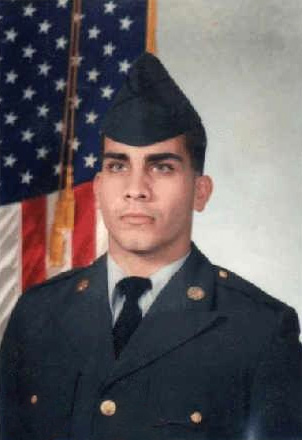

== Career ==
Pardal has been in Zeroville with James Franco and Sector 4: Extraction with Olivier Gruner and Eric Roberts.

He was featured in episode 12, season 2 of “Blood Relatives”, on the Investigation Discovery channel.

In 2016, Pardal joined the cast of the vampire noir film Corbin Nash with Malcolm McDowell, Rutger Hauer, Bruce Davison, Corey Feldman and starring Dean S. Jagger, directed by Ben Jagger. Corbin Nash was released in theaters on April 20, 2018.
