= Fear of the Dark (2003 film) =

- Directed by: K.C. Bascombe
- Written by: John Sullivan
- Produced by: Lee Faulkner
- Starring: Kevin Zegers; Jesse James; Rachel Skarsten; Charles Powell; Linda Purl
- Cinematography: Marc Charlebois
- Edited by: Yvann Thibaudeau
- Music by: Dazmo
- Release date: 2003
- Running time: 86 minutes
- Country: Canada
- Language: English

Fear of the Dark is a 2003 Canadian horror film directed by K.C. Bascombe.

== Cast ==
- Kevin Zegers - Dale Billings
- Jesse James - Ryan Billings
- Rachel Skarsten - Heather Fontaine
- Charles Powell - Eric Billings
- Linda Purl - Sandy Billings
