= Two Tickets to Paradise (film) =

- Directed by: D.B. Sweeney
- Written by: Brian Hayes Currie; D.B. Sweeney
- Produced by: D.B. Sweeney
- Starring: John C. McGinley; D. B. Sweeney; Paul Hipp; Janet Jones
- Cinematography: Claudio Rocha
- Edited by: Katina Zinner
- Music by: John Nordstrom
- Production company: Scrudge LLC
- Distributed by: 41; First Look International; Village Cinema
- Release date: April 6, 2006 (Method Fest Independent Film Festival)
- Running time: 90 minutes
- Country: United States
- Language: English

Two Tickets to Paradise is a 2006 comedy film directed by D. B. Sweeney in his directorial debut. It stars John C. McGinley, Sweeney, and Paul Hipp as three lifelong friends who go on a road trip to escape dissatisfaction with their lives.

== Synopsis ==
The story revolves around three 40-ish lifelong friends from Pennsylvania who go on a road trip in search of themselves. The friends have just two tickets to a major college bowl game in Florida, and along the way the friends run into a few surprises, and some serious self-discovery.

== Production ==
Sweeney decided to make the film after visiting a friend, a New York City firefighter who survived the 9/11 attacks. When Sweeney suggested to his friend that going to see a movie might cheer him up, his friend replied, "They don’t make movies for guys like us."

Filming locations included Interstate 95 and the San Diego area.

== Music ==
The film includes music by Stevie Ray Vaughan, Dire Straits, Bruce Springsteen, Bob Dylan and American Minor. Springsteen in particular agreed to lend his music to the film because he was a fan of the film Eight Men Out, which starred Sweeney.

== Cast ==
- John C. McGinley as Mark Hewson
- D. B. Sweeney as Billy McGriff
- Paul Hipp as Jason Klein
- Janet Jones Gretzky as Sherry, Mark's wife
- Tristan Gretzky as Hayden, Mark's son
- Pat Hingle as Mr. Hewson, Mark's terminally ill father
- Moira Kelly as Kate, Billy's ex-Wife
- Ed Harris as Melville
- Nina Kaczorowski as Scarlet
- M. C. Gainey as Barbosa
- Rex Linn as Karl

The cast also includes ESPN reporter Jenn Brown as a Hooters waitress, and cameos by Vanna White as herself, Gerald McGinley, John's father, as the dentist, and Jean Jones, Janet Jones' mother, as her mother. The movie was Pat Hingle’s final film.

== Release ==
The film premiered at the Method Fest Independent Film Festival on April 6, 2006 and went on to play the film festival circuit. It was released on DVD in June 2008 by First Look International. It was re-released on DVD in 2010.
