= The Five Rules of Success =

- Directed by: Orson Oblowitz
- Written by: Orson Oblowitz
- Starring: Santiago Segura; Jonathan Howard; Isidora Goreshter
- Release date: July 30, 2021
- Running time: 83 minutes
- Country: United States
- Language: English

The Five Rules of Success is a 2021 American crime thriller film written and directed by Orson Oblowitz and starring Santiago Segura, Jonathan Howard and Isidora Goreshter.

== Cast ==
- Santiago Segura as X
- Isidora Goreshter as Emma
- Jon Sklaroff as Avakian
- Jonathan Howard as Danny

== Release ==
The film was released on Amazon Prime and iTunes on July 30, 2021.

== Reception ==
The film has an 83% rating on Rotten Tomatoes based on 12 reviews. Kate Beacom of Film Threat rated the film an 8 out of 10.

Martin Unsworth of Starburst gave the film a positive review and wrote, "Santiago Segura provides a powerhouse performance that in a bigger budgeted film would have been award-worthy."
