= Sydelle Noel =

American actress and former athlete (born 1985)

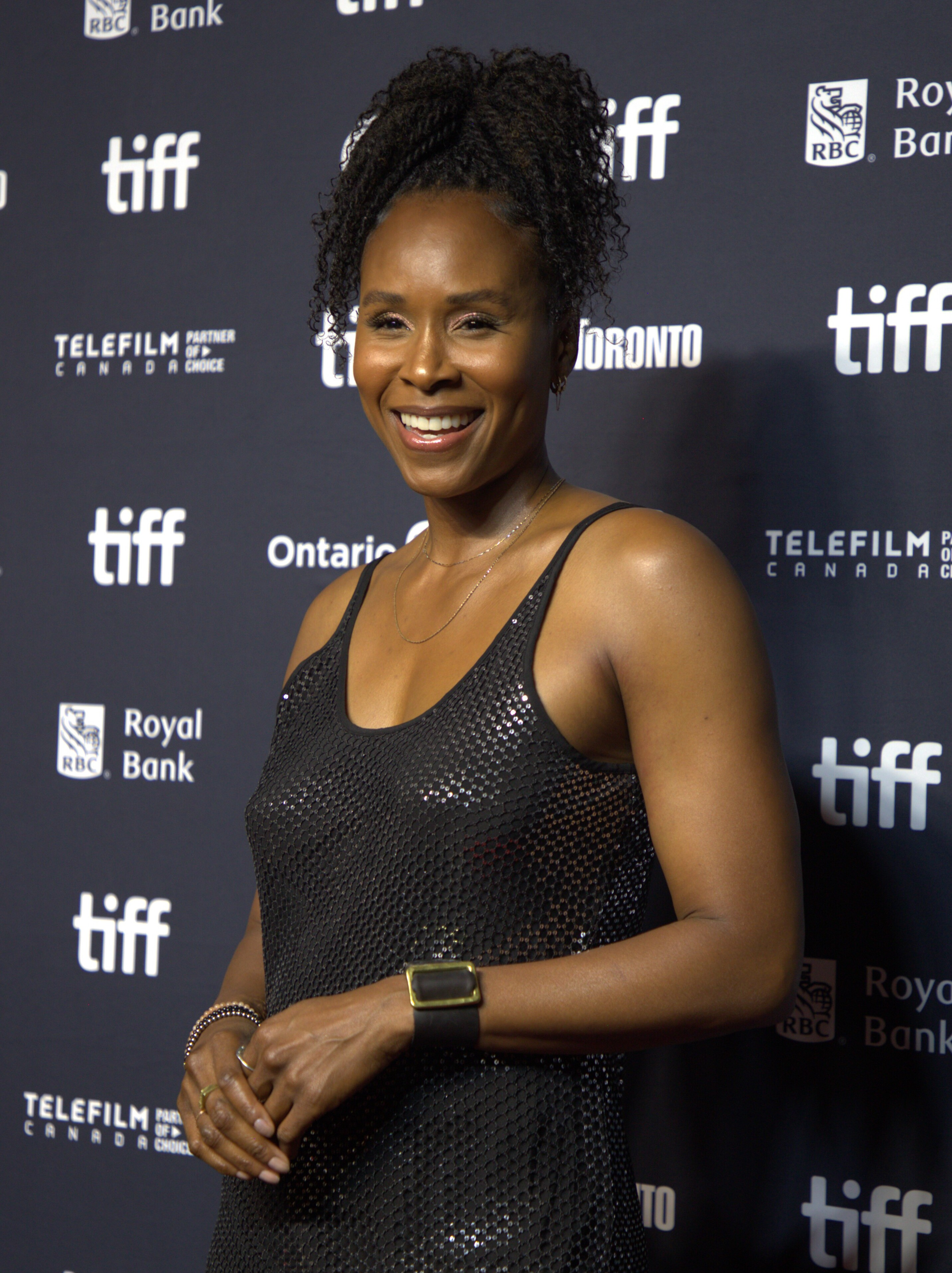
- Noel at TIFF 2025.
- Born: July 16, 1985 (age 41); Hollywood, Florida, U.S.
- Education: University of Georgia
- Occupations: Actress, model
- Years active: 2003–present
- Known for: Cherry "Junkchain" Bang in GLOW

Sydelle Noel (/sɪˈdɛl noʊˈɛl/; born July 16, 1985) is an American actress and former athlete, best known for her role as Cherry "Junkchain" Bang in GLOW.

== Early life ==
Noel was born in Hollywood, Florida. She studied at the University of Georgia on a track scholarship. Her professional running career lasted for several years, but ended due to a stress fracture.

== Career ==
Noel moved into sports modeling, moving to California in 2004, before starting acting.

== Filmography ==
=== Film ===
| Year | Title | Role | Notes |
|---|---|---|---|
| 2008 | First Sunday | Hot Girl | |
| 2008 | Stabbing Abby | Shawna | Short |
| 2011 | CSI Mullet | Detective Sholanda | Short |
| 2011 | Remember Love | Caroline | Short |
| 2011 | Mourning News | Laurie | Short |
| 2012 | Good Satan | Eve | |
| 2012 | Spirit of a Denture | Beatrice | Short |
| 2012 | Private War | Sgt. Jace Reed | Short |
| 2013 | Gus | Jules | |
| 2013 | Things Never Said | Slam poetry host | |
| 2013 | Douglass U | Lynette | |
| 2014 | My Sister | Nurse Su | |
| 2015 | Americons | Monica Jones | |
| 2015 | Captive | Lynn Campbell | |
| 2016 | Retake | Iris | |
| 2018 | Black Panther | Xoliswa | |
| 2019 | Daughter of the Wolf | Hobbs | |
| 2020 | The Clearing | Naomi | |
| 2023 | The Resurrection of Charles Manson | Dr. Adkins | |
| 2023 | Rise | Budu | |
| 2025 | Miami Nights | Lisa Gardner | |

=== Television ===
| Year | Title | Role | Notes |
|---|---|---|---|
| 2006 | Everybody Hates Chris | Girl with Earring | Episode: "Everybody Hates the Buddy System" |
| 2007 | The DL Chronicles | Other Woman | Episode: "Boo" |
| 2007 | Private Practice | Nicole Clemons | Episode: "In Which Addison Finds a Showerhead" |
| 2009 | I Didn't Know I Was Pregnant | Yvonne | Episode: "Bun in the Oven" |
| 2009 | Lincoln Heights | Uniform Officer Sid | Episode: "Trash" |
| 2011 | Criminal Minds: Suspect Behavior | Claire Vernon | Episode: "Jane" |
| 2011 | Traffic Light | Stormy | Episode: "Best Man" |
| 2013 | Bones | Susan Carroll/Emily Kickinson | Episode: "The Doll in the Derby" |
| 2014 | Extant | Deputy | Episode: "Shelter" |
| 2016 | The Night Shift | Georgia | Episode: "Hot in the City" |
| 2017–18 | Arrow | Samanda Watson | Recurring cast: season 6–7 |
| 2017–19 | GLOW | Cherry "Junkchain" Bang | Main cast |
| 2018 | WWE SmackDown | Herself | Episode: "The Road to WWE Extreme Rules 2018 Begins" |
| 2019 | RuPaul's Drag Race | Herself | Episode: "Good God Girl, Get Out" |
| 2026 | Reacher | Tamara Green | Main cast: season 4 |

=== Music Video ===
| Year | Notes | Song | Role |
|---|---|---|---|
| 2017 | Katy Perry featuring Nicki Minaj | "Swish Swish" | Cherry Bang |
