= Derek Phillips (actor) =

American actor

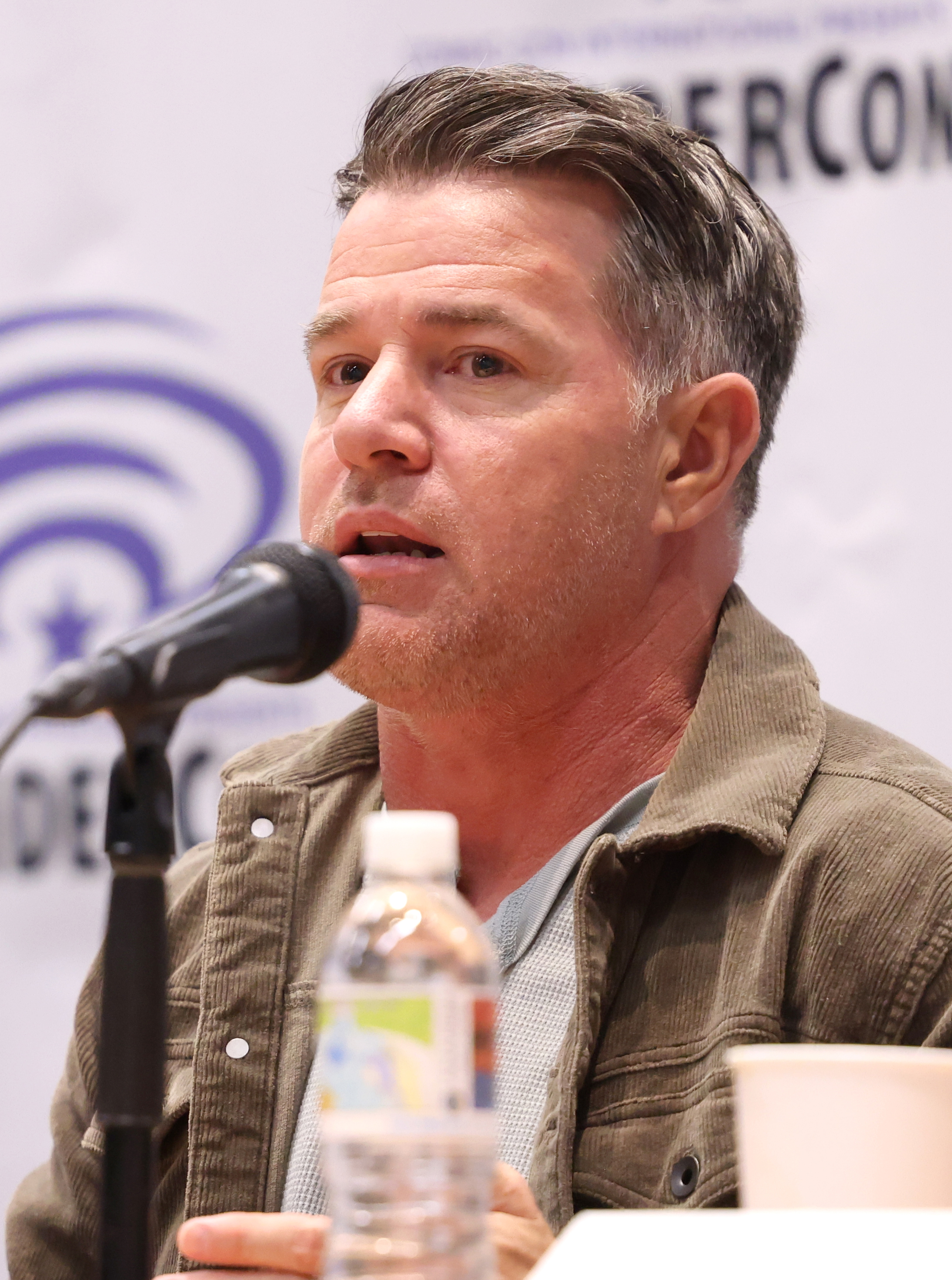
- Phillips in 2025
- Occupation: Actor
- Years active: 2002–present

Derek Phillips is an American actor. He is best known for his role as Billy Riggins in the NBC sports drama series Friday Night Lights, as well as providing the voice and motion capture of Jerry Anderson in the action-adventure survival horror video game The Last of Us Part II. He has also voiced characters in video games such as Dishonored, The Last of Us, Life Is Strange, Battlefield Hardline, Fallout 4, and Rise of the Tomb Raider. He currently voices Heron on the Netflix animated series Blood of Zeus.

== Early life ==
Phillips attended Westminster Christian School in Palmetto Bay, Florida, where he played football alongside future MLB baseball players Alex Rodriguez and Doug Mientkiewicz. He later attended Baylor University in Waco, Texas, where he received a BFA in acting.

== Career ==
Upon graduating, Phillips moved to New York City to look for acting roles. He performed throughout the country in numerous plays, including The Winter's Tale at the Baltimore Center Stage, Of Mice and Men at the Dallas Theater Center, The Glass Menagerie at the Virginia Stage Company, and King o' the Moon at the Capital Repertory Theatre. He is also an actor, associate producer, and assistant director at the award-winning ensemble theater company Second Thought, with whom he has performed in Douglas Post's Earth and Sky, the regional premiere of Eric Bogosian's Humpty Dumpty, and the world premiere of Steven Walters' Pluck the Day.

After years of regional theater and recurring roles on the television series Guiding Light, As the World Turns, and All My Children, Phillips had his breakout role as Billy Riggins on the NBC sports drama series Friday Night Lights. When the series ended, he went on to voice characters in video games such as Dishonored, Aliens: Colonial Marines, The Last of Us, Life Is Strange, Battlefield Hardline, Fallout 4, Rise of the Tomb Raider, and The Walking Dead: Michonne. He received more attention for providing the voice and motion capture of Jerry Anderson in the action-adventure survival horror video game The Last of Us Part II, and currently voices Heron on the Netflix animated series Blood of Zeus. He currently hosts the Friday Night Lights rewatch podcast "Clear Eyes, Full Hearts" with Stacey Oristano, who played Mindy Collette-Riggins (Tyra Collette's older sister, whom Billy eventually married).

== Filmography ==
=== Film ===
Year	Title	Role	Notes	Source
2006	Serum	Eddie		
2011	Son of Morning	Skyler		
2011	Betrayed at 17	Detective Morris	Television film	
2012	A Scene from a Street in L.A.	Daniel	Short film	
2012	Inside	Grant Carter		
2013	42	Bobby Bragan		
2013	The Jogger	Paul		
2013	Ritual	The Man		
2014	Son of the Devil	David Daly	Short film	
2016	Looking: The Movie	Jake	Television film	
2016	Retake	James		
2018	Point Defiance	Peter Allen		
2018	Rift I Duhi	Richard		
2021	Injustice	Dick Grayson / Nightwing / Deadwing; Arthur Curry / Aquaman	Voice, direct-to-video	
2024	Lake George	Cory		

=== Television ===
Year	Title	Role	Notes	Source
2002	Guiding Light	Keevan	2 episodes	
2006	Prison Break	Field Cop	Episode: "Dead Fall"	
2006–2011	Friday Night Lights	Billy Riggins	60 episodes	
2007	Grey's Anatomy	Dale Winick	2 episodes	
2008	Numbers	Ryan Ferraro	Episode: "End Game"	
2009	The Closer	Stomper	Episode: "Strike Three"	
2010	Medium	Sean Riley	Episode: "How to Beat a Bad Guy"	
2010	Trauma	Jason	Episode: "Tunnel Vision"	
2010	Private Practice	Eddie Lindy	3 episodes	
2011	Breakout Kings	Joseph Ramsey	Episode: "Out of the Mouths of Babes"	
2011	Castle	Reggie Walsh	Episode: "To Love and Die in L.A."	
2011	Body of Proof	Kevin Kraiser	Episode: "Love Thy Neighbour"	
2012	Parenthood	Billy Gardner	Episode: "My Brother's Wedding"	
2013–2015	Longmire	Travis Murphy	7 episodes	
2014	Parenthood: Friday Night at the Luncheonette	Billy Riggins	Miniseries	
2014	Murder in the First	Stewart Hornady	Episode: "The City of Sisterly Love"	
2014	Reckless	Ronnie Porter	2 episodes	
2015	Grimm	Stetson Donovan	Episode: "Death Do Us Part"	
2015	The Mentalist	Stan Lisbon	2 episodes	
2015	Chicago P.D.	Damien Boyd	Episode: "Natural Born Storyteller"	
2015	Rosewood	Trevor McCown	Episode: "Necrosis and New Beginnings"	
2015	Doc McStuffins	Wyatt	Voice, episode: "Factory Fabulous"	
2015–2016	Agents of S.H.I.E.L.D.	Agent O'Brien	3 episodes	
2017	Scorpion	Sandhog Frank	Episode: “The Hole Truth”	
2017	Game of Silence	Boots	3 episodes	
2018	Criminal Minds	Danny Wallace	Episode: "Innocence"	
2019	9-1-1	Roger Moss	Episode: "Broken"	
2020–2025	Blood of Zeus	Heron	Voice; main role, 23 episodes	
2021	The Rookie	Mack Daniels	2 episodes	
2022	Law & Order: Special Victims Unit	Ty Hackman	Episode: "A Final Call at Forlini's Bar"	
2022	The Terminal List	SSA Stephen Ramsay	2 episodes	
2022	Chicago Fire	Robert DeMarco	Episode: "All-Out Mystery"	
2022–2023	NCIS: Hawaiʻi	FBI ASAC Michael Curtis	4 episodes	
2024	Creature Commandos	Justin, Billy	Voice, episode: "Cheers to the Tin Man"	

=== Video games ===
Year	Title	Role	Notes	Source
2012	Dishonored	Lord Treavor Pendleton	Voice	
2013	Aliens: Colonial Marines	Corporal Christopher Winter	Voice	
2013	The Last of Us	Additional Voices	Voice	
2014	Murdered: Soul Suspect	Officer Scott / Kurt Wehlander	Voice	
2015	Life Is Strange	Mark Jefferson, Samuel Taylor	Voice	
2015	Battlefield Hardline	Additional Voices	Voice	
2015	Fallout 4	Elder Maxson, Z2-47	Voice	
2015	Rise of the Tomb Raider	Additional Voices	Voice	
2016	The Walking Dead: Michonne	Randall	Voice	
2020	The Last of Us Part II	Jerry Anderson	Voice and motion capture	
2020	Call of Duty: Black Ops Cold War	Raptor-1	Voice	
2021	Call of Duty: Vanguard	Lt. 1st Class Wade Jackson	Voice and motion capture	
2022	The Last of Us Part I	Jerry Anderson	Voice, re-used from Part II	
2023	Mortal Kombat 1	Reiko	Voice	
2024	Concord	Lennox		
2024	Call of Duty: Black Ops 6	Raptor-1	Voice	
2026	Yakuza Kiwami 3 & Dark Ties	Hasebe	Voice	
