= Anthony DeSando =

American actor (born 1965)

- Anthony DeSando as Brendan Filone in The Sopranos
- Born: December 4, 1965 (age 60); Jersey City, New Jersey, U.S.
- Other name: Anthony Joseph De Santis
- Occupation: Actor
- Years active: 1991–present
- Spouse: Bridgit Ryan

Anthony DeSando (born December 4, 1965), also known as Anthony Joseph De Santis, is an American actor. DeSando often portrays a joker or dapper villain in mob films such as New Jack City.

== Early life ==
DeSando was born in Jersey City, New Jersey.

== Career ==
DeSando has appeared in episodes of L.A. Law, Crossing Jordan, NYPD Blue, Without a Trace, CSI: Miami and Sex and the City. One of his more prominent roles is Brendan Filone in The Sopranos. He played sports columnist Tony Amato in all 13 episodes of New York News, Mary Tyler Moore's final television series.

DeSando also starred in Federal Hill along with A Day in Black and White and co-starred in the movies Cement, Beer League, Party Girl (1995 film), Kiss Me, Guido, and The Whole Shebang. He also did the voice of Reggie in the video game The Sopranos: Road to Respect. He appeared as a character in Dito Montiel's films A Guide to Recognizing Your Saints and Fighting. In 2016, he made a cameo in "Friends in Need", the 17th episode of the 6th season of the police procedural drama Blue Bloods, playing the role of Joey Ruscoli, cousin of Detective Anthony Abetemarco. He is an alumnus of The Shakespeare Lab: The Public Theater's Program for Professional Actor Development.

== Personal life ==
DeSando is married to actress Bridgit Ryan. He is also a licensed massage therapist.

== Filmography ==
=== Film ===
Year	Title	Role	Notes
1991	New Jack City	Frankie Needles	
1991	Out for Justice	Vinnie Madano	
1991	Grand Isle	Victor Lebrun	
1994	Federal Hill	Nicky	
1995	Party Girl	Derrick	
1995	Two Bits	Victor	
1997	Kiss Me, Guido	Pino	
1998	Frogs for Snakes	Rilke	
1998	Just the Ticket	Kenny Paliski	
2000	Cement	Sean	
2000	Double Parked	Angel Gonzalez	
2001	Plan B	Mario	
2001	The Whole Shebang	Joey Zito	
2002	Ciao America	Frank Mantovani	
2006	A Guide to Recognizing Your Saints	Frank the Dog Walker	
2006	Artie Lange's Beer League	Dennis Mangenelli	
2009	Fighting	Christopher Anthony	
2014	Friends and Romans	Joseph Bonanno	
2015	Freeheld	Toohey	
2016	Money Monster	Officer Benson	
2019	Mob Town	Mike Miranda	
2021	The Madness Inside Me	Jeremy	

=== Television ===
Year	Title	Role	Notes
1990	Bride of Violence	Albert	3 episodes
1991	The Return of Eliot Ness	Bobby Malto	Television film
1992	L.A. Law	Alex DePalma	11 episodes
1993	Bride of Violence 2	Albert Lamanna	Television film
1994–1995	Under Suspicion	Detective Papadakis	16 episodes
1995	New York News	Tony Amato	1 episode
1997	NYPD Blue	Harvey Doss	Episode: "Alice Doesn't Fit Here Anymore"
1998	Carly	Nicky Tucci	Television film
1998	Sex and the City	Siddhartha	Episode: "The Drought"
1998	Martial Law	Andy Stallworth	Episode: "Trackdown"
1999	The Sopranos	Brendan Filone	4 episodes
2000–2001	Welcome to New York	Vince Verbena	15 episodes
2001	Third Watch	Brett Tunney	Episode: "Exposing Truth"
2002	Hysterical Blindness	Bobby	Television film
2002–2004	Crossing Jordan	Father Paul	2 episodes
2004	Without a Trace	Anthony DeBellis	Episode: "Upstairs Downstairs"
2005	Numbers	Detective Reed	Episode: "Man Hunt"
2007	CSI: Miami	Joey Mazzaro	Episode: "A Grizzly Murder"
2009	Mercy	Derek Whitlow	Episode: "You Lost Me with the Cinderblock"
2009	Bored to Death	Carl	Episode: "The Case of the Beautiful Blackmailer"
2012	Nick the Doorman	Harry	Television film
2012	Person of Interest	Hans Friedrickson	Episode: "Firewall"
2013	Magic City	Eddie Blue	4 episodes
2016–2023	Blue Bloods	Joey Razzano / Joey Ruscoli	4 episodes
2016	Elementary	Peter Dinacio	Episode: "Render, and Then Seize Her"
2018–2019	The Good Fight	Detective Hedren	3 episodes
2020	The Plot Against America	Angelo	Episode: "Part 1"
2020	The Honeyzoomers	Cousin Glenny	2 episodes

=== Video games ===
Year	Title	Role	Notes
2006	The Sopranos: Road to Respect	Reggie	
