= Corbin Nash =

- Film poster
- Directed by: Ben Jagger
- Written by: The Jagger Brothers; Christopher P. Taylor
- Produced by: Todd Matthew Grossma; Ben Jagger; Dean Jagger; Christopher P. Taylor; Matthew Berkowitz; Justin Steele
- Cinematography: Luke Hanlein
- Edited by: Matt Michael
- Music by: Russ Irwin
- Production company: Jagger/Wagner Productions
- Distributed by: Gravitas Ventures
- Release dates: April 11, 2018 (BIFFF); April 20, 2018
- Running time: 96 minutes
- Countries: United Kingdom; United States
- Language: English

Corbin Nash is a 2018 vampire film directed by Ben Jagger. Dean S. Jagger stars in the title role as a police officer who, while investigating the deaths of his parents, learns that it is his destiny to fight evil. Corey Feldman and Richard Wagner co-star as vampires, and Malcolm McDowell, Rutger Hauer, and Bruce Davison appear in cameos.

== Plot ==
Corbin Nash, a New York police officer and boxer, learns from a mysterious stranger that his parents were demon hunters who were slain by vampires. Investigating the lead in Los Angeles, Nash is captured and forced to engage in brutal fights run by demons. After defeating the other competitors, Nash is turned into a vampire and dumped on the streets. He is found by a stripper, Macy, who helps him recover and continue his investigation. Aided by a blind street prophet, Nash discovers that a pair of sadistic vampires, Queeny and Vince, are behind his parents' deaths and the city's problems. After confronting and killing them, Nash accepts his destiny to fight evil.

== Cast ==
- Dean S. Jagger as Corbin Nash
- Corey Feldman as Queeny
- Richard Wagner as Vince
- Fernanda Romero as Macy
- Chris Pardal as Frank Sullivan, an NYPD officer and Nash's partner
- Malcolm McDowell as the Blind Prophet
- Rutger Hauer as the Stranger
- Bruce Davison as Jack, Nash's stepfather

== Production ==
Shooting was scheduled to start on March 30, 2016.

== Release ==
Corbin Nash premiered at the Brussels International Fantastic Film Festival on April 11, 2018. Gravitas Ventures released it to video on demand in the United States on April 20, 2018.

== Reception ==
Dennis Harvey of Variety described it as "a solemnly silly mashup of ideas from Blade, Batman and Sin City" that genre fans may enjoy as "a passable guilty pleasure". John DeFore wrote in The Hollywood Reporter that it "sometimes briefly achieves that rare feat, of being so terrible it entertains", though he said it is frequently boring or offensive. At Dread Central, Matt Boiselle rated it 2.5/5 stars and called it "a poor-man’s Blade" that has too many boring lulls in its action.
