= Devon Graye =

American actor

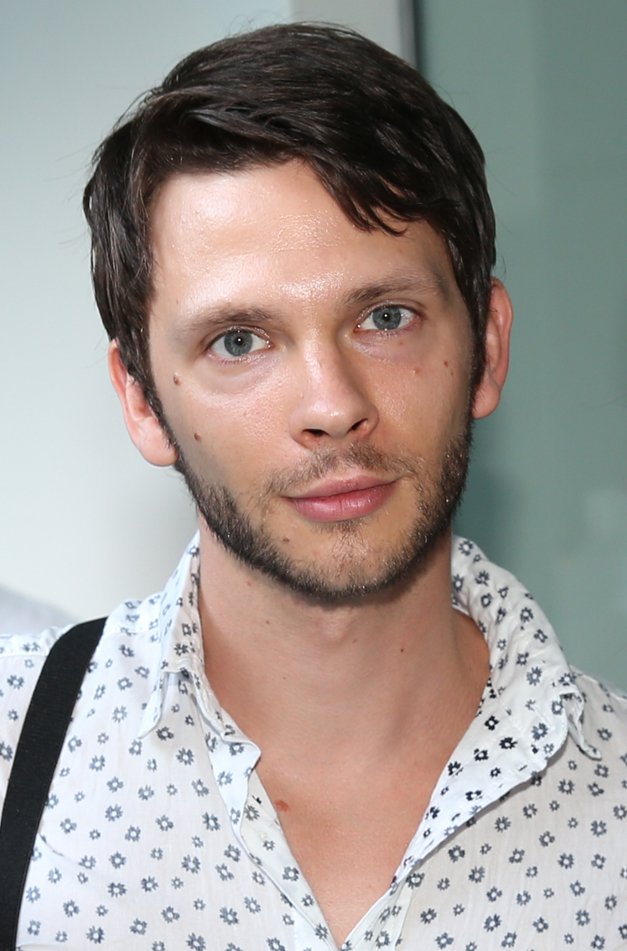
- Graye at the Canadian Film Centre event in L.A. Photos in March 2015
- Born: Devon Graye Fleming; 1986 or 1987 (age 39–40); Mountain View, California, U.S.
- Education: American Conservatory Theater
- Occupations: Actor, filmmaker
- Years active: 2006–present
- Spouse: Jordan Gavaris (m. 2018)

Devon Graye Fleming (born 1986 or 1987) is an American actor and screenwriter. He is best known for portraying teenage Dexter Morgan in the TV series Dexter, as well as the second Trickster in The Flash. He also wrote the 2019 horror film I See You.

== Early life ==
Graye was born in 1986 or 1987 in Mountain View, California. He was homeschooled by his parents, while moving around California. Although Graye is American, he lived in the United Kingdom for all four years of high school before moving back to Pleasanton when he was 16. He studied acting at the American Conservatory Theater in San Francisco.

== Career ==
Graye began his career on the stage, leading as Stanley in a stage adaption of Louis Sachar's Holes. The show played at the Orpheum Theatre in San Francisco from September to October 2005. He then moved to Los Angeles at 18 in hopes to begin his acting career. After just three months, he was cast in his first role with ABC's A House Divided alongside Dylan McDermott. Just a few months later he would be cast in the hit American crime drama Dexter, portraying the younger version of the titular character. He would appear in multiple episodes from 2006 to 2009.

Graye played Luke in the 2008 Nickelodeon television movie Merry Christmas, Drake & Josh, a companion film to the sitcom Drake & Josh.

In 2010, he starred with John Cena, Patricia Clarkson, and Danny Glover in WWE Studios' film Legendary. The film opened to largely negative reviews. He would also have a supporting role in the Disney Channel Original Movie Avalon High, an adaption of Meg Cabot's Arthurian fantasy novel. The following year, Graye lead Brett Simmon's horror film Husk and the drama film Exodus Fall.

In 2012, Graye had a guest role on the second season of Ryan Murphy's American Horror Story. His character, Jed Potter, was a demon possessed teen facing off against Jessica Lange.

He would appear in the 2014 remake of 13: Game of Death, alongside Mark Webber, Tom Bower, and Ron Perlman. He also had a role in Tom Dolby's Last Weekend.

In 2015, he was cast as the second Trickster, a copycat to Mark Hamill's character, in The CW's series The Flash. He was also cast in the LGBTQ+ drama Retake, replacing Luke Pasqualino. The film, where Graye portrays a young male prostitute, was released in 2016.

Graye wrote a thriller screenplay titled Allison Adams, which was featured on the 2016 Black List for most popular unproduced screenplays. The following year, his script for I See You was picked up and set to be directed by Adam Randall, with Helen Hunt set to lead the film. It premiered in 2019 at SXSW to generally positive reviews.

In 2020, it was announced that Graye's spec Switchboard would be produced by Matt Reeves, Steven Schneiderand Armaan Zorace. The film centers on a young female switchboard operator who finds herself communicating with, and possibly targeted by, an active serial killer.

The psychological thriller The Madness Inside Me was released in 2021, with Graye portraying a murderer being stalked by his victim's spouse. It received mixed reviews.

Graye had a supporting role in the 2022 psychological horror film Hypochondriac, directed by Addison Heimann. He acted alongside Zach Villa and Madeline Zima. He also had an appearance in Jordan Peele's Western science fiction horror film Nope, as paparazzo Ryder Muybridge.

Graye had a brief role in the second season of Netflix's The Lincoln Lawyer, before being upgraded to a recurring character in 2024 for the third season.

A sequel for the hit 2015 science fiction psychological thriller Circle was announced in June 2024, with Graye writing the script.

== Personal life ==
Graye is gay and began dating actor Jordan Gavaris in September 2013. They married in 2018.

== Filmography ==
=== Film ===
Year	Title	Role	Notes
2007	Her Best Move	Boy No. 1	
2007	Scar	Paul	
2009	Call of the Wild	Ozz Heep	
2009	Lure	Tyler Page	
2010	Legendary	Cal Chetley	
2011	Exodus Fall	Dana Minor	
2011	Husk	Scott	
2012	The Discoverers	Jack	
2012	One Bad Thing	Guy	Short film
2012	Eden	Adam	
2013	Last Weekend	Luke Caswell	
2013	Khumba	Zebra # 2	Voice role
2014	13 Sins	Michael	Aka "Angry Little God"
2014	Dissonance	Carson	Short film
2014	Eden	Adam	Short film
2015	I Am Michael	Cory	
2016	Search Engines	Bert	
2016	Retake	Adam	
2017	I Don't Feel at Home in This World Anymore	Christian	
2017	Sightless	Detective Bryce	Short film
2018	The 100th Victim	Earl Fuller	Short film
2019	The Teleios Act	Paul	Short film
2020	I Blame Society	Taylor	
2021	The Madness Inside Me	Francis Tate	
2022	Hypochondriac	Luke	
2022	Drawn into the Night	Tyler	
2022	Nope	Ryder Muybridge	

=== Television ===
Year	Title	Role	Notes
2006	A House Divided	Daniel Sampson	Television film
2006–2009	Dexter	Teenage Dexter	9 episodes
2007	Close to Home	Spencer Gordon	Episode: Internet Bride
2008	Wisegal	Nino Narrator	Television film; voice role
2008	Merry Christmas, Drake & Josh	Luke	Television film
2008	Bones	Robbie Timmons	Episode: The Finger in the Nest
2008	Novel Adventures	Miles	2 episodes
2008	CSI: Miami	Noah Campbell	Episode: Wrecking Crew
2008	Leverage	Michael Clark	Episode: The Bank Shot Job
2009	Saving Grace	Luke Keeler	Episode: Do You Believe in Second Chances?
2009	CSI: Crime Scene Investigation	Craig Mason	Episode: Ghost Town
2010	The Deep End	Josh Chapman	Episode: Nothing Personal
2010	Avalon High	Marco Campbell	Television film
2011	Red Faction: Origins	Leo	Television film
2011	The Protector	Sam Campbell	Episode: Pilot
2011	Alphas	Matthew Hurley	Episode: Anger Management
2012	Body of Proof	Jack Gordon	Episode: Mind Games
2012	American Horror Story	Jed Potter	Episode: Tricks and Treats
2013	Major Crimes	Ryan Keller	Episode: Risk Assessment
2013	Longmire	Dacus Whitish	Episode: Carcasses
2014	The Night Shift	Pvt. Wilson	Episode: Coming Home
2015	The Mentalist	Ethan Bittaker	Episode: The Whites of His Eyes
2015–2018	The Flash	Axel Walker / The Trickster	2 episodes
2018	S.W.A.T.	Pete	Episode: The Tiffany Experience
2019	L.A. Confidential	Bobby Inge	Television film
2021	PEN15	Roger	Episode: Luminaria
2023–2024	The Lincoln Lawyer	Julian La Cosse	9 episodes
2024	Grey's Anatomy	Brandy Hauser	Episode: I Carry Your Heart

=== Video games ===
Year	Title	Role	Notes
2016	Titanfall 2	Titan Pilot	
2019	Days Gone	Additional voices	

=== Audio ===
Year	Title	Role	Note
2018	Exeter	Ben	Podcast drama; 6 episodes

=== As writer ===
Year	Title	Notes
2019	I See You	
2021	The Girlfriend Experience	Staff writer; 4 episodes
2025	Circles	
TBA	Switchboard	

== Stage ==
Year	Title	Role	Venue	Ref.
2005	Holes	Stanley	Orpheum Theatre, San Francisco	

== Awards and nominations ==
Year	Award	Category	Nominate work	Result	Ref.
2013	Gen Art Film Festival	GenArtist Emerging Actor Award	The Discoverers	Won	
