= James Burrows (actor) =

English actor (born 1991)

- Born: 7 July 1991 (age 33); Derby, Derbyshire, England
- Occupation: Actor
- Years active: 2006–present
- Known for: Safe House (2015); Mount Pleasant (2016); Coronation Street (2018–2020)
- Children: 1

James Burrows (born 7 July 1991) is an English actor. He is best known for his role of Ali Neeson in Coronation Street (2018–2020) and for his recurring roles in Safe House (2015) and Mount Pleasant (2016).

== Personal life ==
Burrows is in a relationship with Sophie Coates. Their daughter was born in 2019. The couple became engaged in August 2019.

== Filmography ==
=== Film ===
Year	Title	Role	Notes
2006	This Is England	Teasing kid	
2008	Eden Lake	Harry	
2010	Robin Hood	Feral Child	
2011	Inbred	Tim	
2013	Uwantme2killhim?	Ryan Robins	
2014	A Kindness	Luke	Short film
2019	Fighting with My Family	Roy Knight	
2022	Three Day Millionaire	Curly Dean	

=== Television ===
Year	Title	Role	Notes
2009, 2011	Doctors	Jac Paine / Danny Moffat	3 episodes
2010, 2013	Coming Up	Adam / Gary	2 episodes
2011	Casualty	Craig Scranton	Episode: "Pascal's Wager"
2012	Skins	Jake	Episodes: "Everyone" and "Franky"
2012	Vera	Charlie	Episode: "A Certain Samaritan"
2012	Emmerdale	Kenny McDonald	2 episodes
2013	Silent Witness	Derren Blackburn	Episodes: "Legacy: Part 1" and "Legacy: Part 2"
2013	My Mad Fat Diary	Kendo	Episodes: "It's a Wonderful Rae: Part 1" "It's a Wonderful Rae: Part 2"
2013	The Crash	Ethan Logan	Television film
2014	Happy Valley	Liam Hughes	Episode: "Episode One"
2015	Father Brown	Thomas Brandon	Episode: "The Paradise of Thieves"
2015	Safe House	Sam Blackwell	4 episodes
2015	Prey	Daniel Hope	Episodes: "The Choice" and "The Consequence"
2016	Fresh Meat	Colin	Episode: "Episode Six"
2016	Brief Encounters	Simon	Miniseries; 3 episodes
2016	Mount Pleasant	Denty	8 episodes
2017	Love, Lies and Records	Simon	4 episodes
2018–2020	Coronation Street	Ali Neeson	Regular role Shortlisted—2018 Inside Soap Award for Best Newcomer
2021	All Creatures Great and Small	Dave Kitson	Episode: "The Perfect Christmas"
2022	Without Sin	Karl McKeller	3 episodes
2023	Hijack	Jonty	7 episodes
2023	The Couple Next Door	Kyle	2 episodes
2024	Phoenix Rise	Danny Jacobs	Episode: "Cov Rocks"
2024	Sherwood	Jarrod	2 episodes
