= Bad Move =

British television sitcom

- Genre: Sitcom
- Created by: Jack Dee; Pete Sinclair
- Written by: Jack Dee; Pete Sinclair
- Starring: Jack Dee; Kerry Godliman; Sue Vincent; Miles Jupp; Manjinder Virk; Seann Walsh
- Opening theme: "In the Country" by Cliff Richard and The Shadows
- Composer: Damian Coldwell
- Country of origin: United Kingdom
- Original language: English
- No. of series: 2
- No. of episodes: 13

Production
- Executive producer: Andrew Beint
- Producer: Debbie Pisani
- Camera setup: Single-camera
- Running time: 28 minutes (including adverts)
- Production company: Open Mike Productions

Original release
- Network: ITV
- Release: 20 September 2017 – 24 December 2018

Bad Move is a British television sitcom written by Jack Dee and Pete Sinclair, that premiered on ITV on 20 September 2017. The series stars Dee and Kerry Godliman as Steve and Nicky Rawlings, a middle-aged married couple who escape city life in Leeds by relocating to the countryside. They encounter many problems and soon regret their move.

On 7 November 2017, the show was recommissioned for a second series. It began airing on 19 September 2018. On 5 February 2019, it was announced that the series had been axed by ITV, after 2 series. However ITV bosses revealed later in February that this series, and Birds of a Feather, had not in fact been axed and the announcement was a misunderstanding.

== Plot ==
Steve and Nicky are both on their second marriages and have decided that moving to the Yorkshire countryside from Leeds is the perfect setting for them. They've watched all the TV relocation shows and read the glossy lifestyle magazines and fell in love with the idea of 'getting away from the rat race'.

Living a quiet existence in rural surroundings is a big disappointment for Steve and Nicky. They soon find living in the countryside much worse than they anticipated. They discover that the house which they have bought is in a bad condition and they have great difficulty in having it renovated. It is situated in what locals refer to as 'The Dip' - a place where internet signals cannot reach, but floodwater can. They are disappointed with their small village's lack of amenities, as well as the hostile and unhelpful shopkeeper. The couple dislike their neighbours, who include annoying couple Matt and Meena as well as eccentric rock musician Grizzo.

== Cast ==
- Jack Dee as Steve Rawlings
- Kerry Godliman as Nicky Rawlings
- Sue Vincent as Shannon
- Miles Jupp as Matt
- Manjinder Virk as Meena
- Seann Walsh as Grizzo
- Philip Jackson as Ken
- Thelma Ruby as Alice

== Filming ==
Location filming took place within the North York Moors National Park in spring 2017. Although seemingly part of the same village, scenes were shot at different places that are in fact several miles apart.

The Rawlings' new home is near Low Mill in Farndale. Abbey Stores in Rosedale Abbey was temporarily converted to the Garthdale Minimarket and much of episode two was filmed in Fadmoor. Episode four featured the White Horse Farm Inn in Rosedale Abbey.

Other filming locations included West London Film Studios.

== Episodes ==
Series	Episodes	Originally released	
Series	Episodes	First released	Last released
1	6	20 September 2017	25 October 2017
2	6 (+1)	19 September 2018	24 October 2018; 24 December 2018 (special)

=== Series 1 (2017) ===
No. overall	No. in series	Title	Directed by	Written by	Original release date
1	1	"Dead Zone"	Martin Dennis	Jack Dee and Pete Sinclair.	20 September 2017
Nicky and Steve have left behind their old life in Leeds and bought a house in the countryside. Their new life is rapidly becoming a nightmare, especially for Steve, whose business as a website designer faces a major problem - they cannot get their internet connected, due to their house being in a dip. Landscape gardener Nicky finds only one customer, an old woman whose payment is a cake rather than money. Grizzo crashes through the Nicky and Steve's roof in his jet-propelled parachute.
2	2	"Deep End"	Martin Dennis	Jack Dee and Pete Sinclair.	27 September 2017
When Nicky and Steve discover that their kitchen is flooded, so they call on Nicky's father for help. Steve hopes that the source of the water is a natural spring, but it is rainwater which has collected due to the house being in a dip. Steve tries to find Grizzo's pet panther which has gone missing in order to claim a reward for doing so. Nicky walks a neighbour's dog.
3	3	"Shut Up"	Martin Dennis	Jack Dee and Pete Sinclair.	4 October 2017
Nicky and Steve's dreams of peaceful country nights are ruined by Grizzo and his band rehearsing his latest album outdoors. But Steve is not getting much sleep anyway - his web design business is losing customers to a rival firm. To make matters worse, Matt and Meena's latest business venture is going from strength to strength. When they ask Steve for some free advice on designing a website he is even more crestfallen. But that is nothing to his reaction when Nicky manages to land him with a work experience boy from the local village - Bronson.
4	4	"Get Lost"	Martin Dennis	Jack Dee and Pete Sinclair.	11 October 2017
Nicky and Steve are shocked to discover that an ancient public right of way runs straight through their garden. When Steve makes an enemy of the ramblers who insist on using it, an intense battle of wits ensues. Their only hope is to persuade the villagers to sign their petition. Meanwhile, Matt and Meena have organised their children into taking part in a sponsored recorderthon for the local hospital. They are adamant that Nicky and Steve should come along to support it. Grizzo is preoccupied with a new craze – EFT or ‘tapping therapy’. Could it be the answer to Nicky and Steve’s problems?
5	5	"Day Trip"	Martin Dennis	Jack Dee and Pete Sinclair.	18 October 2017
On a Monday, Nicky and Steve are missing the hustle and bustle of the city. They fantasise about all the exciting things they could be doing if they still lived in Leeds and had not moved to the middle of nowhere. All Steve has to look forward to is a day of chasing up invoices for his web design business, before Grizzo's drone with a chainsaw attached narrowly misses Steve. Meanwhile, Nicky is conned by Alice, an elderly woman from the village, into taking to the hospital in Leeds. When they arrive, they discover that Alice's appointment is next Monday.
6	6	"Party Time"	Martin Dennis	Jack Dee and Pete Sinclair.	25 October 2017
Nicky and Steve decide to put a brave face on things and invite all their old friends from Leeds for a long-overdue housewarming party. However, with Matt, Meena, and Ken on the scene, and most of their friends from Leeds deciding not to come, most of the village turns up uninvited, including Grizzo - via helicopter. Local habitual thief Bronson steals the acrow props that are holding up the chimney whilst work is being carried out on it - causing the chimney to fall through the roof.

=== Series 2 (2018) ===
No. overall	No. in series	Title	Directed by	Written by	Original release date
7	1	"Country Pile"	Adam Miller	Jack Dee and Pete Sinclair.	19 September 2018
Nicky and Steve try to get their roof fixed but after Steve's attitude drives away prospective builders their prospects look bleak. Then they discover Honest John who seems to be the builder they hoped for. However it turns out he is too honest when he reports a nest of rare moths in the roof which are a protected species and will prevent the repairs from continuing. Steve angrily tells John what he thinks of him.
8	2	"Big Deal"	Adam Miller	Jack Dee and Pete Sinclair.	26 September 2018
When Steve discovers a wealthy potential new client for his business, he is determined to do anything to keep her on his side, including lying about how amazing his move to the country was and that he greatly improved his house. However, he quickly needs to find a solution when she asks to come and see his "renovated" house. With Matt and Meena on holiday in Greece, and Steve and Nicky looking after their house, Steve pretends that Matt and Meena's house is his. Matt and Meena come home unexpectedly early, whilst Steve, Grizzo and the client are in their house.
9	3	"Local Hero"	Adam Miller	Jack Dee and Pete Sinclair.	3 October 2018
For once, the entire village ends up united against a scheme to start fracking in the local area, especially as it would force the villagers to leave and sell their houses for market value. Except Steve and Nicky realise that is exactly what they have been hoping for, so Steve attempts to risk everyone's fury by single-handedly arguing in favour of fracking, but without anyone realising it is him.
10	4	"Speed Trap"	Adam Miller	Jack Dee and Pete Sinclair.	10 October 2018
With Steve finally regaining his driving license, he promises that his days of speeding are over, no matter how much he is tempted by Grizzo's new sports car. However, it may come in handy to chauffeur Ken to his inauguration ceremony as the new president of the local bowls club. Meanwhile, Kerry has to endure tedium in renovating the green before the ceremony starts.
11	5	"Food Fight"	Adam Miller	Jack Dee and Pete Sinclair.	17 October 2018
As the village attempts to raise funds for a new defibrillator, Matt and Meena attempt to make things more interesting by challenging Steve and Nicky to a charity dine-off. With Matt and Meena being fussy as ever towards Steve and Nicky's cooking, and their own food and entertainment only winding Steve up more, he finally decides to let his neighbours know what he really thinks of them.
12	6	"Village Idiot"	Adam Miller	Jack Dee and Pete Sinclair.	24 October 2018
It is time for the village's traditional Lantern Man festival, and Steve ends up with the hopes of the village on his shoulders when is he chosen to look after the Lantern Man alone in a shack in the woods all night. However, being scared is the least of his worries for the festival, especially when he may have to contend with defusing the dangerous combination of Grizzo and fireworks.

Christmas special
No. overall	Title	Directed by	Written by	Original release date
13	"Festive Cheer"	Adam Miller	Jack Dee and Pete Sinclair.	24 December 2018
With Steve and Nicky's respective families not visiting them over Christmas, Steve decides that the two of them will pass on doing Christmas this year. However, they are soon convinced by their neighbours to have some drinks together on Christmas Eve. As if that concept was not bad enough, an unprecedented blizzard threatens to make their Christmas Day even more bleak.

== Reception ==
The first series achieved a 22% audience share on ITV and averaged four million viewers per episode.
