= List of My Mad Fat Diary episodes =

My Mad Fat Diary is a British comedy-drama television series that aired on E4 from 14 January 2013 until 6 July 2015. It is based on My Fat, Mad Teenage Diary, written by Rae Earl.

== Series overview ==
Series	Episodes	Originally released	
Series	Episodes	First released	Last released
1	6	14 January 2013	18 February 2013
2	7	17 February 2014	31 March 2014
3	3	22 June 2015	6 July 2015

== Episodes ==
=== Series 1 (2013) ===
No. overall	No. in series	Title	Directed by	Written by	Original release date
1	1	"Big Wide World"	Tim Kirkby	Tom Bidwell	14 January 2013
In 1996, 16-year-old fat girl Rae Earl is introduced to her new doctor, Kester Gill, who reminds her that her old doctor requested that she keep a diary. Rae has a flashback to when she was first released. Her mum, Linda, picks her up. They run into Rae's old friend, Chloe, and Rae lies about her stint in hospital by telling Chloe that she has just returned from a stay in France. Chloe invites her to hang out with her and her new friends Izzy, Chop, Finn, and Archie. Rae initially refuses, but agrees when she sees Archie. Rae goes to a local pub with Chloe and is introduced to the gang. The next day, Rae gets upset when she goes to the pub and sees them hanging out without her. After Chloe apologises, Rae has a run-in with Finn as they both want to choose the music on the jukebox, but she impresses the gang with her music taste. They invite her to a pool party and she goes shopping with Chloe for swimwear. Chloe lights up a cigarette in the changing room, which causes the fire alarm to go off and forces Rae to leave the shop topless; she is mocked by passersby and spotted by Archie. She tries to return to the hospital, where her friend, Tix, convinces her to embrace her new life outside. She goes to the party and finds Archie sitting outside, and he confides in her that he is nervous about swimming as he's embarrassed by the acne on his back. She agrees to swim if he does. When she tries to enter the pool via the slide, she gets stuck and accidentally reveals self-harm marks on her legs. She manages to laugh it off by joking about her size, and gets Chop to help her into the pool. Later, Chloe finds Rae's hospital bracelet.
2	2	"Touched"	Tim Kirkby	Tom Bidwell	21 January 2013
With Chloe in a relationship, Rae also wants a boyfriend, but is worried she'll never get one. She gets annoyed with Kester when he asks her to compliment herself more, because she is extremely uncomfortable with her appearance. She is also embarrassed by her lack of sexual experience. Rae unexpectedly gets asked out by Archie, and decides to make a few changes to prepare herself. She goes jogging, borrows a book on sex from the local library (claiming it is for her mother), and throws away all the junk food in her house. After discovering the junk food in the bin and hearing gossip about Rae getting books about sex, Rae's mum grounds her for 24 hours, but Rae sneaks out when Archie comes to pick her up. Archie takes Rae to a closed swimming pool and kisses her before inviting her for a second date. Chloe and Izzy decide to give Rae a makeover before the second date. Whilst waiting for Archie to turn up, Finn arrives to let Rae know that Archie isn't coming. He later visits her to tell her that he thinks that what Archie did was wrong, and encourages Rae to confront him. When she does, she is shocked to find out that Archie is secretly gay. Archie apologises and the two remain friends with Rae promising to keep his secret. That night, Rae has her first orgasm while masturbating to a fantasy about Finn.
3	3	"Ladies and Gentlemen"	Tim Kirkby	Tom Bidwell	28 January 2013
Rae is invited by Finn, Archie, and Chop to see Oasis perform at Knebworth. She is happy until Chop reveals that they invited her because they consider her "one of the lads". She goes outside and is shocked to see Chloe giving their PE teacher, Mr. Carrisford, a blowjob. Rae realises that Mr. Carrisford is Chloe's secret boyfriend. She disapproves and starts an argument between the two. Chloe confides in Rae that she is pregnant and is going to have an abortion, but has not yet told Mr. Carrisford. When out with the boys, Chop takes out Oasis shirts that he had printed for everyone, with Rae's saying "Raemundo" on the back. She gets mad and refuses to try it on because she doesn't like the nickname. She goes to the toilets and discovers there is blood on the back of her skirt, caused by her period. She covers herself with a sheet of paper and leaves the bathroom to discover that everyone has left except for Finn, who has his back to her. She sneaks past him and walks home. On the way, a group of boys who have bullied Rae in the past make fun of her. Finn shows up, punches the leader, and makes him apologise. As the boys run off, Rae starts to develop feelings for Finn. She goes to meet the boys to go to Knebworth and thanks Finn for what he did. Chloe, who is there to see them off, tells Rae that she told Mr. Carrisford about the pregnancy and that they broke up. She confirms she is going to have the abortion, and Rae decides to miss the concert to accompany Chloe to the abortion clinic. They go back to Chloe's house after the abortion and listen to the concert on the radio. Rae tells Chloe that she wasn't really in France, revealing that she was mentally ill and self-harmed. Chloe begins to question Rae but is interrupted by a phone call from Mr. Carrisford, who wants to talk at his house. Chloe asks Rae to stay in her bedroom so her parents think that she is home, leaving Rae alone.
4	4	"Don't Ever Tell Anyone Anything"	Benjamin Caron	Tom Bidwell	4 February 2013
Rae contemplates telling Finn that she has started to develop feelings for him. She also decides that she wants to tell everyone the truth about her stay in hospital, but Chloe talks her out of it. She begins to worry that Finn will never see her as more than a friend, prompting a friend from the hospital, Danny Two Hats, to give her some advice about how to get out of the "friend zone". He tells her to treat Finn coldly and remain distant; she does so, which confuses and upsets Finn. Rae's mum announces that she and her illegal immigrant boyfriend Karim have to go to his native Tunisia for a few days to stop immigration officers discovering him, and tells Rae she is not allowed to have any parties. Rae discovers that all the cheerful postcards she had received from her father over the years were actually sent by her mother. Angry, she invites the gang for a sleepover, leaving them in her house while she goes to her therapy session. Kester encourages Rae to open up about what triggered her self-harm, but she refuses when Kester won't tell her anything about his life. Rae heads home to discover that the sleepover has turned into a massive party. She is angry when she discovers that Danny Two Hats is telling everyone at the party that he used to date Rae, in a misguided attempt to help Rae make Finn jealous. In a game of spin the bottle, Finn and Rae end up in a closet together, where he confronts her about her distant behaviour. Rae later finds him distraught over the death of his grandmother, and the two connect emotionally before falling asleep together. Chloe later confesses to Rae that she has a crush on Finn, and Rae's mum returns from Tunisia to announce that she has married Karim so he can stay in the country.
5	5	"It's a Wonderful Rae Part 1"	Benjamin Caron	Tom Bidwell	11 February 2013
Rae and Chloe begin to fight for Finn's affections. Rae's mum discovers her plans to go to a rave with the gang and forbids her from going. After vomiting while shopping, Rae discovers that her medication causes her to feel nauseous if mixed with alcohol. She decides to stop taking her medication when it begins to affect her social life. She then proceeds to get into an argument with her mother after she frees Karim's pet birds in the middle of the night, resulting in them being killed by cats. It eventually leads to her mother slapping her and Rae leaving and going to Finn's house. Meanwhile, Rae fails to show up to a dinner she had planned with Tix. Finn convinces her to go to the rave, where she gets drunk and takes drugs. Finn sees her kissing Archie and comes to the wrong conclusion. Chop confides in Rae that he loves Izzy. She tells him to confess to Izzy, but they find Izzy kissing someone else, making Chop leave. Rae and Archie look for him but give up and go back into the rave, where Rae sees Chloe kissing Finn. Upset, she runs outside and passes out on the ground. The next morning, Chop gives her a lift home, claiming not to remember the night before. Rae sees Karim with another family. When she gets home, she receives a call from Kester to tell her that Tix has collapsed and is in hospital.
6	6	"It's a Wonderful Rae Part 2"	Benjamin Caron	Tom Bidwell	18 February 2013
Rae is in a very dark place following Tix's deterioration. When she meets the gang in the chippy for a debrief, Chop and Archie leave, and she finds herself feeling awkward after witnessing the kiss between Chloe and Finn the night before. While Finn is in the bathroom, Chloe tells Rae that she has actually started to develop real feelings for Finn. Rae has fantasises about running Chloe over with a truck. Finn returns and the three sit in silence until Rae decides to leave, forgetting her bag. After she tells her mother she had seen Karim with another family, she finds out that Karim had not cheated on her mother and that it was actually his sister and her children. She realises that she has left her diary at the chippy. When she goes to get it back, the woman behind the counter tells her that her "pretty friend" took it for her. She runs to Chloe's house, but it is too late; Chloe has already read its contents—including insults about Chloe and Rae's love for Finn—and Rae is alienated from the group. Rae becomes gradually more depressed and tries to commit suicide by jumping off a bridge, only to be hit by a car before she can jump. She enters a dreamlike state in which Tix acts as a guardian angel, showing her what the world would be like without her. After being told that she is in a coma, she agrees to wake up but finds that she is not in coma and is still lying on the side of the road. The leader of the boys who Finn had punched for bullying Rae shows remorse for accidentally running her over and drives her to the hospital. Rae then goes to see Kester and they have a heart-to-heart about her father, who is not around, and about why she had just tried to commit suicide again. He tells her to go to her mother's wedding reception and she agrees, changing into the dress her mother had bought for her. After Chloe tells Rae to stay away from her and her and the gang at the reception, Rae decides to give a speech and finally reveals the truth about herself. Chop reveals how he feels about Izzy, and Archie tries to reveal the fact that he is gay but decides against it. Rae and Chloe make up, with Chloe revealing that Finn is not interested in her. When she goes looking for Finn, she finds him at the chippy and he tries to tell her something but fails, so he instead uses their "special language" and writes "I love you" on her back with his finger. She tells him not to say it if he doesn't mean it, but he confirms that he means it. The next day, Rae starts to make an effort to connect with Karim, and they share a tender moment in which Karim tries to talk about his pet birds in English, but soon converts back to French. Rae goes back to Kester for her session and asks whether she needs to be admitted again as she had tried to kill herself. He says no, so she asks whether she is "better", to which he also says no. He then tells her that she is ready for therapy. Rae smiles, knowing that she is one step closer to getting better.

=== Series 2 (2014) ===
The show, which drew an average of 1.2 million viewers per episode, was re-commissioned for a second series and started filming around June or July 2013. It aired on 17 February 2014. The second season aired on E4 and consisted of seven episodes. The series featured Rae starting college.

No. overall	No. in series	Title	Directed by	Written by	Original release date
7	1	"Alarm"	Anthony Philipson	Tom Bidwell	17 February 2014
Rae prepares to write a new entry in her diary, only to discover that it's full. Instead, she opts to write a letter to Tix, detailing the events of the summer in which she reveals the happenings of the gang: Archie and Chloe are still "their usual selves", Chop and Izzy are still dating, her mother and Karim are happily married, and Rae is actually happy for the first time in a long time. There is a flashback to the day after her mother's wedding, where Chloe gathers the gang to discuss Rae's illness. Rae assures everyone that she is happy and healthy, and she finally begins a relationship with Finn. With the events of the summer recounted, Rae returns to the present day. In a session with Kester, she informs him that she has stopped keeping a diary, and he brings up the idea of a group therapy session so Rae can discuss an important issue, but she quickly rebuffs his suggestion. With the gang, Rae is horrified to discover that college is beginning soon while she and Izzy are still virgins. Chloe suggests the gang go on a camping trip so the girls can have sex with their boyfriends. Rae prepares for sex by buying lingerie, watching a pornographic movie left in her mother's VCR, and getting a bikini wax. In another therapy session with Kester, she accidentally reveals that she is still suffering from body image issues and worries that she is not beautiful enough for Finn. The gang goes on their camping trip and Rae fears her efforts have been futile as Finn doesn't pick up her hints for sex, Chop only got two tents instead of three, and Izzy admits that she and Chop had already had sex. Finn shows Rae a secluded, romantic spot where they can have sex. However, she changes her mind and realises that she is not ready. Archie rebuffs several of Chloe's attempts to seduce him. The gang begins college and Rae fears being teased for her weight again. She becomes anxious and runs out of a fire door, accidentally setting off the alarm. In the confusion, Rae ditches school altogether. Rae attends another therapy session with Kester, where it is revealed that Tix has died. Rae agrees to attend group therapy to cope with her loss. There, she recognises a boy from college who saw her set off the alarm.
8	2	"Radar"	Anthony Philipson	Tom Bidwell	24 February 2014
Rae has been skipping college ever since she pulled the alarm and is eventually found out by her mother. She is forced to resume school and ordered to report to the principal's office. Outside the office, she sees Liam, the boy from her therapy group who saw her set off the alarm. However, he does not tell on Rae, which confuses her. The principal tells Rae that she doesn't have to start college until she is strong enough, but Rae insists she is ready. Rae decides to stay "under the radar" like Archie, who is pretending to be straight in order to avoid homophobic bullying. He warns her about Simi, an infamous bully who marks people for life with cruel nicknames. Chloe has a crisis when she realises that she is not as popular as their classmate Stacey, and gains attention when half-naked photos of herself are posted at school. Chloe initially pretends someone else did, it but admits to Rae that she did it for attention. Rae avoids Finn, who has become popular at college, fearing that she will be teased for not being beautiful enough for him. Rae runs into Liam and thanks him for not tattling, and they bond over their hatred of college. Finn invites Rae over for an "exclusive sleepover" where they can finally have sex. At his house, she looks through his photo albums and is horrified to discover that he once dated the beautiful Stacey. She runs out and decides to break up with him at college. She pulls him into an "out of order" disabled bathroom, but the door handle falls off, trapping the two. Finn refuses to let Rae dump him and insists that he loves her. When they are finally let out, a rumour starts that they were having sex, embarrassing Rae. Linda initially believes she is starting menopause, but learns she is actually five months pregnant. Rae realises she is not ready for a relationship and breaks up with Finn. At the end of the episode, Rae and Liam bond over a drink.
9	3	"Girls"	Luke Snellin	Tom Bidwell and Laura Neal	3 March 2014
Rae meets Finn at the park to return each other's items. He tells her that they cannot be friends because the break up is too painful for him. Depressed, Rae returns to binge eating. She distances herself from her friends, opting instead to sit alone during college and read. Unable to eat in front of people, she begins to eat alone in the library. Archie visits Rae and she forgives him for joining in the teasing but encourages him to stop being closeted. Meanwhile, Chloe has joined the popular group, led by Stacey. Stacey defends Rae when Simi attempts to bully her in the park and Chloe offers Rae a chance to join the popular group. However, Rae notices that she must change herself completely to fit in, and that Stacey is a cruel bully who bosses the other girls around, especially Chloe. Stacey catches Rae about to eat in the library and Rae reluctantly admits to her she cannot eat in front of people. Stacey appears to be touched and assures Rae that her secret is safe. Lois, a member of the popular group, reveals that her secret boyfriend is Archie. Chloe and Rae arrive at Stacey's birthday party and Rae is horrified to discover that the party is at a restaurant. Stacey mocks Rae for not eating in front of people and having had enough, Rae confronts her and eats a slice a pizza in front of everyone. She storms off angrily but is happy to have conquered her fear. She bumps into Liam who offers to share his chips with her and she happily accepts. Chloe also stands up to Stacey and the other girls kick Stacey out of the group for being cruel. Rae approaches Lois when she is with Archie and informs Lois that Archie is gay, leaving both of them speechless.
10	4	"Friday"	Luke Snellin	Tom Bidwell	10 March 2014
Rae and Liam have grown a lot closer during their time in group therapy together, causing his girlfriend Amy to become jealous and threaten Rae. Rae's mother announces that the baby will be born into Islam, and she will be making major changes to her life to accommodate her decision. Finn and Rae rekindle their friendship and Archie eventually forgives Rae but their happiness is short lived when Lois threatens to out him to the whole school on Friday. After receiving advice from Danny and Chloe, Rae opts to spend less time with Liam. However, Liam insists on hanging out with Rae, which causes a jealous Amy to challenge Rae to a fight. Finn offers Rae self-defense lessons and at their session, Finn reveals that he is dating someone which causes Rae to "accidentally" punches him in the face. Archie and Rae opt to leave their troubles behind and get out of Lincolnshire before Friday. Their trip is cut short when Archie's car breaks down and, after an emotional conversation about his homosexuality, the two decide to return home to face their fears. Kester advises that Rae speak to Amy alone to avoid a fight. All is going well until Amy's friends arrive, demanding to see a fight on Friday. Rae goes to Liam's house to ask him to speak to Amy, only to find him having a panic attack. After she calms him down, the two share a kiss, which makes Rae feel guilty. On Friday, Archie meets with the gang and admits his secret. Everyone, except Chop, is happy for him. Rae prepares to fight Amy but Chloe stands up for Rae and gets punched. Rae confesses the kiss to Amy, who runs away in tears. Chloe is angry that she took a punch for nothing and leaves Rae. Back at home, several tin cans fall on Rae's face, giving her with two black eyes. The next day, Archie tells Rae that his parents took the news well, but is disheartened when he is kicked off the football team.
11	5	"Inappropriate Adult"	Vanessa Caswill	Tom Bidwell	17 March 2014
Archie is struggling with the change in his social status after coming out while Chloe has become popular and is hanging out with older guys. To Rae's dismay, Finn is dating a 24-year-old named Olivia, and Liam broke up with Amy, although he is still ignoring Rae. Jealous of Finn's relationship with Olivia, Rae kisses Liam again and they agree to a casual relationship. At home Rae, becomes increasingly rebellious and is caught smoking pot by Karim. Despite being grounded, she accepts Chloe's invitation to go to a party, where she meets an older guy named Saul. When she returns home, her mother Linda is furious and orders Rae to move in with her father, Victor. Finn visits Rae and tells her that he and Olivia broke up and he is thinking of moving to Leeds, unless she can think of a reason for him to stay. Instead of answering, Rae leaves him to meet Saul. However, Saul attempts to force himself on Rae at a party and she flees. A drunk Chloe refuses to leave her boyfriend Ian so Rae goes to see Kester, who is with his new girlfriend, Carrie. Kester calls Karim to take Rae home, but Linda insists Rae go with Victor. In the morning, Archie tells Rae her that he caught Izzy kissing another boy, Peter. Simi continues to bully Archie for being gay and Archie calls Chop a coward for not defending him. Izzy later breaks up with Chop and Archie realizes that their gang has fallen apart. Victor gives Rae a record player for her birthday and she is delighted to bond with him but grows uncomfortable when he mocks her mother. Rae and Chloe have an argument over Chloe not supporting Rae after Saul's attack and they call their friendship off. Rae attempts to win Finn back but discovers that he already left for Leeds. Rae goes to visit Kester, but at the urging of Carrie, he informs her that their relationship needs to be more professional. After having a sexual encounter with Liam, she returns home to see the sonogram of her mother's baby and sits alone in the dark.
12	6	"Not I"	Alex Winckler	Tom Bidwell	24 March 2014
Chloe is the lead in the singing group but goes missing before the performance, meaning that Rae has to take her place. She goes to Chloe's house to confront her, where she learns that Chloe has run away. Rae finds Chloe's diary and takes it, becoming livid when she reads Chloe's version of their friendship that portrays Rae in a bad light. Izzy gives Rae extra tickets to the school concert, suggesting that she invite people to support her. Rae wants to invite family but Linda is still mad at her and Victor is going away for the weekend. As Rae reads more of Chloe's diary, she realizes that she has let Chloe down and Chloe truly does care about Rae. Rae feels guilty for being a terrible friend and realizes that Chloe is not an awful person. Rae admits to Kester that she is dating Liam, much to his displeasure. During group therapy, Rae admits her fears about the concert and Liam attempts to cheer her up, only to get yelled at by Kester for being disruptive. Liam storms off and Rae follows him outside. He tells her that he won't return to group therapy and asks her out. As she reaches the end of Chloe's diary, Rae realize that she knows where Chloe is: at Ian's house. Rae is forced to take Chloe's place and her performance is a disaster. She leaves a note for Chloe's parents to tell them where Chloe is. She then seeks comfort from Liam and prepares to have sex with him.
13	7	"Glue"	Alex Winckler	Tom Bidwell	31 March 2014
After Rae lost her virginity to Liam, they wake up together and she leaves to go to Chloe's house. Rae is shocked to learn that Chloe is still missing so she gives Chloe's diary to her parents to help. Rae decides to enlist the gang to search for Chloe but tensions are high as Archie is angry at Chop for his homophobia, Chop is hurt that Izzy dumped him, and Izzy is angry at Archie for telling Chop she cheated. Izzy admits the reason she cheated was because she was angry at the way Chop treated Archie, and they all go their separate ways. Rae goes to Ian's house to see if Chloe went back to him but she is not there. Rae returns home to find her mother has collapsed and calls an ambulance. Linda gives birth to a healthy baby girl but is still in critical condition. In a therapy session, Kester forces Rae to stop being hard on herself. Rae goes back to the hospital to check in on her sister, where Finn visits her. He reveals that he is returning to Lincolnshire. Rae returns to Ian's and finds Chloe, and they make up and leave together. Rae is finally allowed to see her mother who forgives her, leaving Rae to make things right with the gang. Rae breaks up with Liam and arranges for the gang to meet up at the local pub. Izzy apologizes to Archie and Chop defends Archie from Simi, causing them all to make up. Izzy and Chop get back together and Danny Two Hats joins the gang, this time only wearing one hat. Finn arrives at the pub, and asks Rae if they can go somewhere and talk about their relationship. Rae responds that she doesn't think it's a good idea, leaving Finn looking heartbroken, but it's revealed that Rae and Finn meet up in her room. They then proceed to have sex, with Rae finally feeling happy again.

=== Series 3 (2015) ===
On 26 November 2014 Sharon Rooney confirmed on Twitter that there would be more episodes. A read through was held on 26 January 2015. The series consisted of three episodes, which began filming in February 2015 and were shown on E4 between 22 June and 6 July 2015.

No. overall	No. in series	Title	Directed by	Written by	Original release date
14	1	"Who is Stan Ford?"	Alex Winckler	George Kay	22 June 2015
It's June 1998. Rae Earl has life as a teenager nailed. Despite a disastrous university interview Rae gets a place at university. It is revealed Rae has a job in a record shop. She must decide to go or to stay with her friends. Archie finds a new lover who is Rae's boss at her workplace. Kester tells Rae that she's ready to discharge her from therapy and Finn finds out Rae has been hiding a letter from the university. Finn wants a break from her ultimately making her choose university or Stamford; she chooses Stamford. Rae has a party but then there is a car crash causing devastation.
15	2	"Rewind"	Alex Winckler	George Kay	29 June 2015
Feeling responsible for the crash that has put Chloe in hospital, Rae tries to make things right but is upset when Chloe's parents blame her and prevent her from seeing their daughter in the hospital. Rae has a chance encounter with her estranged father, Victor, and opens up to him about making amends to the people in their lives. With that in mind, Rae puts Chloe's name on her exam paper. Karim throws Linda a surprise birthday party which turns disastrous when a drunk Victor shows up and Rae had forgotten to get a cake. Things start to look up when Chloe is forgiving and welcoming and, thanks to her mum, Rae is allowed to resit her exam. Rae goes to make up with Finn but is devasted when she walks in on Katie in his bedroom.
16	3	"Voodoo"	Alex Winckler	George Kay	6 July 2015
Rae has a heart to heart with Kester, who admits he was discharged from his position as a therapist some months prior, but kept coming back to help Rae because of how much he cares about her. He advises her to re-read her diary to prove to herself how far she has come and how much she can now cope with. Karim gets a new job in Tunisia for six months and Rae questions why her mum is not moving with him - she admits it's because she doesn't think Rae is up to being left alone. Katie seeks out Rae and apologizes to her for what happened to Finn, but warns her that she is dragging her friends down with her problems. Rae starts to take an overdose in the bath, but starts to realize that she can learn to live with her problems and face them head on, before telling her new therapist she feels ready to end the sessions. After her final exam she sits down with the gang and tells them about Finn, before going on to say that their support is what will keep her moving forwards when things get dark. Chloe storms off to confront Katie, but Rae chases after her and tells Katie to never speak to her again. Later that night she convinces her mum to move to Tunisia with Karim, and vows to Chloe that the two of them will always stay close friends. As the gang gather at the prom, Finn also turns up and apologizes for kissing Katie, admitting that despite Rae's constant fears he is the one not good enough for her. Rae tells him that just because they're not together now, doesn't mean it might not happen one day. Two months later, it revealed Izzy went on to study Textiles and Chloe got the grades she needed in her retakes. Rae meets up with Kester who opens her results for her and congratulates her on getting a place at Bristol University. As Rae packs her bags and hugs her mum goodbye she makes one last entry in her diary: writing that while she will cope with whatever comes her way, the madness is hers and will travel on with her.
