= The Irregulars =

British crime drama streaming television series

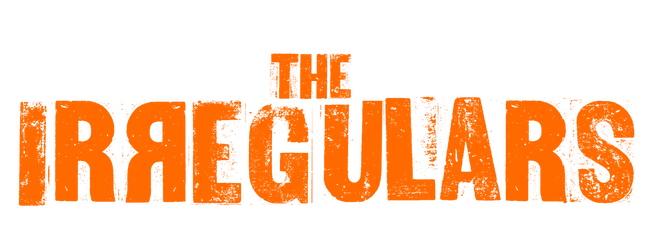
- Genre: Crime drama; Mystery; Fantasy; Supernatural horror
- Created by: Tom Bidwell
- Based on: The works of Sir Arthur Conan Doyle
- Starring: McKell David; Thaddea Graham; Jojo Macari; Harrison Osterfield; Darci Shaw
- Country of origin: United Kingdom
- Original language: English
- No. of series: 1
- No. of episodes: 8

Production
- Executive producers: Tom Bidwell; Greg Brenman; Jude Liknaitzky
- Producer: Rebecca Hodgson
- Production location: United Kingdom
- Running time: 49–58 minutes
- Production company: Drama Republic

Original release
- Network: Netflix
- Release: 26 March 2021

The Irregulars is a British mystery adventure crime drama television series created by Tom Bidwell for Netflix. Loosely based on the works of Sir Arthur Conan Doyle, it features the Baker Street Irregulars working for Dr. Watson saving London from supernatural elements.

Developed by Drama Republic, the eight-episode series premiered on 26 March 2021. In May 2021, the programme was canceled after one series.

== Premise ==
A group of teenagers living on the streets of Victorian London known as the Irregulars work for John Watson to solve increasingly supernatural crimes, while they search for Sherlock Holmes.

== Cast ==
=== The Irregulars ===
- Thaddea Graham as Bea, leader of the Irregulars. She is described as headstrong, fierce, and protective of her peers and her younger sister. She is 17 years old.
- McKell David as Spike, described as "fast-talking charmer", and "dashing". He keeps the group together with common sense and humour. He is 16 years old.
- Jojo Macari as Billy, the muscle of the group. He has a short fuse and tends to settle things with physical fights, He met Bea and Jessie in the workhouse when they were children. He is 16 years old.
- Harrison Osterfield as Leopold, a prince who has haemophilia and who has lived a rather sheltered life. He befriends Bea and the Irregulars and joins them on their adventures, providing resourcefulness and knowledge. He is based on Queen Victoria's youngest son, Prince Leopold, Duke of Albany. He is 17 years old.
- Darci Shaw as Jessie, Bea's younger sister who has nightmares, and then is able to view and show the memories of the people she touches. She is 15 years old.

=== Recurring ===
- Clarke Peters as the Linen Man, a series original character who interacts with the Irregulars using their dreams. He claims to be from Louisiana and wants the Irregulars to keep tracking down the criminals and report to him on their supernatural powers.
- Royce Pierreson as John Watson, a resident of Baker Street who hires Bea and the Irregulars.
- Edward Hogg as Daimler, Leopold's footman.
- Ian Whyte as Plague Doctor, a masked character who haunts Jessie in her nightmares.
- Alex Ferns as Vic Collins, the abusive taskmaster of the workhouse where some of the Irregulars used to be.
- Nell Hudson as Louise, Leo's older sister, a princess and daughter of Queen Victoria and Prince Albert.
- Henry Lloyd-Hughes as Sherlock Holmes, a private detective who "appears to be a shadow of his former self".
- Eileen O'Higgins as Alice, the deceased mother of Bea and Jessie

=== Guest ===
- Rory McCann as the Bird Master / Arthur Hilton, an ornithologist who acquired the ability to control birds.
- Lisa Dwyer Hogg as Sister Anna, a nun who presides over the churchyard where Bea and Jessie's mother's grave lies.
- Charles Armstrong as Mr. Bannister, Mycroft's assistant
- Jonjo O'Neill as Mycroft Holmes, Sherlock's brother, in charge of a government organisation on the paranormal.
- Sheila Atim as the Tooth Fairy
- Olivia Grant as Patricia Coleman Jones, a participant in the order of the Golden Dawn.
- Aidan McArdle as Inspector Lestrade
- Tim Key as Gregson, a Scotland Yard inspector
- Anna Maxwell Martin as Edith Dubois, the Collector

== Episodes ==
No.	Title	Directed by	Written by	Original release date
1	"Chapter One: An Unkindness in London"	Johnny Allan	Tom Bidwell	26 March 2021
Four teenagers, the eponymous Irregulars, live in a London cellar: Jessie, who has recurring nightmares; Beatrice, her older sister and the leader of the group; Billy, who likes to fight; and Spike, a clever and charming boy with a network of friends and associates around London. When Jessie wanders off one night in a dreamlike state, she is nearly hit by a carriage carrying Leopold, Queen Victoria's youngest son. Leo sees Bea come to Jessie's aid and is intrigued. John Watson, a resident of 221B Baker Street, hires Bea and her friends to investigate the abduction of four newborn babies. Spike leads Bea and Billy to the missing sister of an abducted baby, but they are attacked by an immense flock of birds which kill the girl. Leo joins Bea and her friends, and helps them to identify another baby that is likely to be stolen. That night, Bea, Leo, and Billy see a giant bird abduct the baby, and follow it to a person who is able to control birds. Jessie has a nightmare where she is being choked by a person wearing a mask. She escapes and meets the Linen Man, who teaches Jessie how to using her abilities and asks her to help him find the source of the Bird Man's power. Bea deduces that the Bird Man is the father of a stillborn child delivered in the same hospital on the same day as the abducted babies, and she, Leo and Billy track him to his home. There, the Bird Man attacks them, but Jessie and Spike arrive. Jessie shows the Bird Man his own memories of the past, and reveals to him that his child, whom he believed to be stolen, had been died along with his wife during childbirth. Driven mad by grief, the man attempted to contact the spirit of his late wife, and gained his powers. With the Bird Man shocked back into sanity, the babies are rescued and returned to their homes. Bea, realising that Watson knows of Jessie's abilities, confronts him. Watson reveals that the horrors the Irregulars have seen so far are just the beginning, and that Jessie's powers are needed to protect London.
2	"Chapter Two: The Ghosts of 221B"	Johnny Allan	Tom Bidwell	26 March 2021
Bea steals jewelry on the street and gets caught. Watson bails her out and asks The Irregulars to work on another paranormal case, where a tooth fairy has stolen 3 victims' entire sets of teeth. Bea and Jess go to investigate an abandoned dentistry, and find a woman inside. Billy and Leo set out to interview the victims and their families. Spike breaks into 221B to find out more about Watson. Leo confesses to Billy about having haemophilia which causes him pain as well as confidence issues. The tooth fairy turns out to be a woman who plots to murder the Duke of Winchester as she blames him for her father's suicide. She grew clones from the victims' teeth and plans to have them murder the Duke in front of an audience. The only way to prevent the Duke's death is by killing her, but Bea struggles as she doesn't want to take a life. As the tooth fairy attempts to kill Billy with her clone, Bea hesitantly kills the tooth fairy woman, saving Billy. Spike discovers a letter addressed to Watson from a group called the Golden Dawn. Bea visits the address, and is greeted by Mycroft Holmes.
3	"Chapter Three: Ipsissimus"	Joss Agnew	Tom Bidwell	26 March 2021
When the leader of the Golden Dawn (an occult cult) is murdered and his body positioned like a tarot card, the Irregulars are hired by Mycroft Holmes to find the murderer. Upon meeting with the other members, and when more bodies are found, they become trapped inside the house, where it is evident that the target is Jessica.
4	"Chapter Four: Both the Needle and the Knife"	Joss Agnew	Sarah Simmonds; Tom Bidwell	26 March 2021
Bea and Jess are angry that rubbish has been left by their mother's grave. Watson hires the Irregulars to investigate a murder committed by a man who was murdered days before. Bea sets out to locate Sherlock Holmes' whereabouts and investigate his link to their mother. Jess, Spike and Billy go to work with an inspector on the murder case. Bea and Leo shares a kiss. Jess accidentally touches a man on the street and looks into his memories to discover the man took part in the gang rape of a girl named Clara, where they got her drunk, drugged her and then raped her at the local pub. Clara ended up contacting syphilis from the incident and becomes infertile, therefore seeking revenge against her attackers. She kills and skins the 3 men's faces, and shapeshifts into them upon, wearing them where she sees fit. Leo attends his debut party and meets a girl who offers him recreational drugs. The two share a kiss until Leo realises that the girl is selfish, unlike Bea who is compassionate. He jumps off of the 2nd floor of the castle to find Bea and the rest of the Irregulars. Clara skins the barman's face as she blames him for the incident at the pub, as he allowed the 3 men to hire the room they attacked her in. Clara then takes his place in his family, as she will never have one of her own. Clara is found and chased by the Irregulars but Jess lets Clara go after she showed Jess how she obtained the power and has no intention of hurting anyone else. Bea tracks down Sherlock at her mother's grave.
5	"Chapter Five: Students of the Unhallowed Arts"	Weronika Tofilska	Tom Bidwell	26 March 2021
Bea interrogates Sherlock about her mother; he tells her about investigations from 15 years ago that he and Watson conducted along with Bea and Jessie's mother, Alice. Leo does not want to let Bea see his wound from the castle falling as this would expose his haemophilia. Jessie's nightmares continue with the Linen Man informing her that he is sailing to London to see her in person and help her. Billy encounters a man from their workhouse days who used to beat and abuse them when they were kids. Bea and Jess discover from Sherlock's story that he is Jessie's biological father and that their mother was absorbed closing the rip last time. Billy learns information about his past from the workhouse man, which shakes him, but instead of fighting, he walks away in a state of shock. Leo finally opens himself up to Bea and lets her see his wounds; they spend the night together.
6	"Chapter Six: Hieracium Snowdoniense"	Weronika Tofilska	Tom Bidwell	26 March 2021
Bea and Leo visit a hospital ward where patients have had body parts stolen, with perfectly healed wounds. Bea instantly recalls the one case that Sherlock never solved from 15 years ago, called the Collector, and tries to convince the Irregulars he/she is back now that rip has reopened. Spike and Leo plead with Jess to go deeper into her nightmare to find the rip, but she refuses and turns away from them. Billy shares with Bea the story the workhouse master told him about his parents. As Leo goes to look up the address of Edith Dubois, the botanist responsible for the Snowdonia Hawkweed clue that Sherlock gave Bea, he is found by his royal footman, Daimler, who accuses the prince of playing "dress up" with the poor. Leo threatens Daimler's job and says he will return to the palace when he is ready. The Irregulars find Dubois's diary, revealing her as the Collector, who is trying to revive her husband, Sammy by rebuilding his body. Jess goes to Sherlock to try to decipher her nightmares, and they deduce that she should be looking for a plague pit. Bea, Billy and Spike find Dubois's laboratory, where she has Watson captive, and reveals that he was the one who opened the rip last time using a relic that she had given him. Instead of helping Dubois, Watson took the relic and tried to use it to contact the dead so that he could impress Sherlock. DuBois injects a serum to wake her husband from the coma and then tells the others she plans to poison them. Sammy awakes and murders Edith for keeping him a prisoner in his own body, whilst the Irregulars and Watson escape. Billy again encounters the workhouse man, who taunts him and goads him into a fight. Billy accidentally kills him and is taken to jail. Daimler sneaks into the cellar and reveals Leo's true identity to Bea. She confronts Leo, tells him she never wants to see him again, and forces him to go back to the palace. Jess follows a trail of death and destruction to the London port, where The Linen Man has just arrived. After trying to get her to reveal the location of the rip, he tells her of his true intentions.
7	"Chapter Seven: The Ecstasy of Death"	Joss Agnew	Tom Bidwell	26 March 2021
The Irregulars are separated: Bea, Sherlock, and Watson are at Baker Street, Jess is trapped in her nightmares, Billy is in jail, and Spike is looking for a way to free Billy. The Linen Man's plan is to enter the Bird Man's memories, locate the rip, and start a new nightmare world. In her nightmares, Jess is taunted by the Linen Man and is buried alive by the plague doctors. Spike sneaks into the palace to persuade Leo to have Billy released from jail. Bea, Sherlock and Watson meet Capt. Girard at the prison, where The Linen Man soon shows up and kills the guards. He avoids their trap, overtakes the Bird Man, and learns the location of the rip. The group manages to trap the Linen Man between two locked doors, but he whispers something imperceptible to Sherlock who then releases him. They exit together, leaving Bea and Watson confused and upset. The Irregulars gather at 221B and together call to Jess to wake up from her nightmares. Within her dreams, Jess wakes up from her friends' calls to find miners clearing a path to the rip, located in the Inner Circle railway line.
8	"Chapter Eight: The Ecstasy of Life"	Joss Agnew	Tom Bidwell	26 March 2021
The city of London descends into chaos with people attacking each other in the streets and becoming monsters. Watson and the Irregulars travel in the sewers to approach the rip. One by one, the Linen Man touches them, inducing illusions that riddle them with their own worst fears. Before he reaches her, Jess touches the Linen Man, and the two attempt to enter each other's memories. Jess enters the Linen Man's memories and states that he cannot cause hurt and torture to others without feeling a piece of it himself. He becomes tortured by the pain of all the people he has hurt in the past, loses his balance, falls from a height, and eventually dies. The others emerge from their illusions and reunite with Sherlock, who reveals that the Linen Man made promises of seeing Alice again. The rip grows; Alice emerges from within and huddles with her family, declaring that she will stay with them forever. Alice tells them she was alone in Purgatory and opened the rip to be reunited with her loved ones. Once the rip is large enough, it will take over the existing world, meaning there will be no more life or death. As they reach the point of destruction, Jess tells Alice that she needs to return otherwise their world will be destroyed. Sherlock and Bea protest; they feel that their previous life wasn't worth living without Alice. To change her mind, Jess shows Bea some of her happiest memories. It works. Bea stops protesting and Jess begins to close the rip. Alice re-enters and is followed by Sherlock. Watson stubbornly grabs onto Sherlock while Jess struggles with the power of the rip and starts to be pulled into it. Bea holds on tight but will lose Jess without Watson's help. Eventually Watson lets Sherlock go and helps Bea to save Jess. The rip is closed. London returns to normal, and the Irregulars celebrate with fish and chips. Spike tells Jess his worst fear was Jess being in pain/losing her, and the two hold hands. Leo tearfully explains to Bea that although he loves her, they cannot be together. He made a deal with his family that he would marry Princess Helena Augusta if they saved Billy from jail. They have a tearful goodbye. Bea goes to Watson's home and breaks down in tears. They bond as they both struggle with losing the people they love.

== Production ==
=== Development ===
On 20 December 2018, it was announced that Netflix was planning a series with Tom Bidwell based on the Baker Street Irregulars. Tom Bidwell described the programme as "my dream project and my oldest idea" and it takes a different view of Holmes and his relationship to the Irregulars.

Sherlock Holmes had a group of street kids he'd use to help him gather clues so our series is what if Sherlock was a drug addict and a delinquent and the kids solve the whole case whilst he takes credit.

Bidwell served as executive producer alongside Jude Liknaitzky and Greg Brenman. Directors for the series were Endeavour's Johnny Allan as lead director with Joss Agnew and Weronika Tofilska also directing.

=== Casting ===
In December 2019 the cast was announced as Henry Lloyd-Hughes in the role of Sherlock, Royce Pierreson as Doctor Watson, and Clarke Peters as Linen Man, Thaddea Graham as Bea, Darci Shaw as Jessie, Jojo Marcari as Billy, McKell David as Spike, and Harrison Osterfield as Leopold. In September, 2020 it was announced that Aidan McArdle had joined the cast in the role of Inspector Lestrade along with Olivia Grant as Patricia Coleman-Jones. In December, 2020 Sheila Atim was also credited as having an unknown role.

=== Filming ===
The series was announced to be filmed in the UK, with reports In early December 2019 that filming had taken place in Nantwich at Dorfold Hall. Filming took place in Liverpool and on the Wirral in late 2019 and early 2020, making use of several locations including St George's Plateau, the palm house in Sefton Park, Falkner Street in the Georgian Quarter and the Grand Entrance at Birkenhead Park. Scenes were also filmed in Stoke-on-Trent at the Gladstone Pottery Museum.

Filming was temporarily disrupted in January 2020 when a cast member was injured on set on Liverpool's Ormond Street. Filming took place in Chester towards the end of January 2020, in Abbey Square, next to Chester Cathedral and also in the city's suburb of Hoole. Production then went to North Wales in March.

Filming resumed in August 2020, starting with scenes in Ellesmere Port that were intended to be filmed in March.

On 31 March 2021, Esquire magazine reported that the second series was scheduled to film in Liverpool during the summer of 2021. However, on 4 May 2021, Netflix announced that they had cancelled the series for undisclosed reasons.

== Release ==
On 22 February 2021 Netflix released the first teaser trailer for series. The eight-episode series premiered on Netflix on 26 March 2021.

== Reception ==
On Rotten Tomatoes, the series holds an approval rating of 80% based on 40 critic reviews. The website's critics consensus reads, "It taps into some fairly regular plot points, but when it dares to defy expectations and focus on its charming young cast, The Irregulars hints at something truly special lingering beneath the surface." Metacritic reported a weighted average score for the series of 61 out of 100 based on 15 critic reviews, indicating "generally favorable" reviews.

It was ranked second on the Top "Shows on the Rise" Week Ended March 28 list by Rise Ratio. The show managed to top Nielsen's Original Streaming Shows Charts, beating out Disney+'s The Falcon and the Winter Soldier.
