= The Madame Blanc Mysteries =

British crime-drama television programme

- Genre: Cosy mystery Crime; Mystery; Dramedy
- Created by: Sally Lindsay; Sue Vincent
- Directed by: Dermot Boyd
- Starring: Sally Lindsay; Steve Edge; Robin Askwith; Sue Holderness; Sue Vincent; Alex Gaumond; Aonghus Weber; Margeaux Lampley; Tony Robinson
- Composer: Steve White
- Country of origin: United Kingdom
- Original language: English
- No. of series: 4
- No. of episodes: 28 (4 specials)

Production
- Executive producers: Mike Benson; Sally Lindsay
- Producer: Andy Morgan
- Running time: 60 minutes
- Production company: Saffron Cherry Productions

Original release
- Network: Channel 5 Acorn TV
- Release: 16 October 2021 – present

The Madame Blanc Mysteries is a British cosy crime comedy drama television series, produced by Saffron Cherry Productions, which is broadcast on Channel 5 and Acorn TV. The series, written by and starring Sally Lindsay and Sue Vincent, concerns an antiques dealer, Jean White, originally from Cheshire, who helps solve an array of mysteries in the fictional village of Sainte Victoire in Southern France, inspired by the French village of Vauvenargues, Bouches-du-Rhône.

The series premiered on 16 October 2021, and includes Robin Askwith, Steve Edge and Sue Holderness amongst the supporting cast. Following broadcast, the series became one of the most popular new shows on Channel 5, with episodes averaging around 2.5 million viewers. The first series was also released on DVD on 13 December 2021. The series' signature theme, "Passing Through", was written specifically for the show by Lindsay's husband Steve White.

== Plot ==
Successful antiques dealer husband and wife Jean and Rory White (Sally Lindsay and Peter Gaynor) live in a sleepy village in Cheshire, England, but own a cottage in the village of Sainte Victoire in the south of France. When Rory is killed in a car crash in Sainte Victoire, Jean realises all her assets have been pawned off, leaving her penniless. She then travels to France to unravel the mystery of her husband's death, his missing valuable ring, and the identity of the woman with whom her husband was having an affair, solving other mysteries along the way with the help of local taxi driver Dom (Steve Edge), local chateau owners Judith and Jeremy (Sue Holderness and Robin Askwith) and the local Chief of Police, Caron (Alex Gaumond).

Each episode features its own individual mystery, and several guest stars, such as Paul O'Grady, Les Dennis and John Thomson, appear in one-off roles, with Tony Robinson as a recurring character in Series 3 and 4.

== Production ==
The series was officially announced in January 2021 under the title The Reluctant Madame Blanc, with casting released later in the year. Although set in the South of France, the series was actually filmed in Malta, mainly on the island of Gozo. The village of Sannat was the setting for "Sainte Victoire" in the first series; subsequent series were set in Għarb.

Series 3 was also shot in Malta: on Gozo and in Valletta, taking advantage of the 40% rebate offered to filmmakers by the Malta Film Commission. Series 3 total budget was €5,319,052, with €5,063,689 (95.2%) spent in Malta. Series 3 total employment was 107 individuals, with 86 individuals local to Malta, and 21 individuals from abroad.

It was reported in May 2026 that The Madame Blanc Mysteries had been commissioned for a fifth series.

== Cast ==
- Sally Lindsay as Jean White; an antiques dealer and amateur sleuth.
- Steve Edge as Dom Hayes; a local taxi driver.
- Sue Holderness as Judith Lloyd James; lady of the manor.
- Robin Askwith as Jeremy Lloyd James; Judith's husband.
- Alex Gaumond as Major André Caron; chief of local police.
- Sue Vincent as Gloria Beauchamp; a local garage owner.
- Tony Robinson as Uncle Patrick; Dom's Uncle
- Paul Chuckle as Trevor Beauchamp; Gloria's father.
- Aonghus Weber as Niall Connor (Series 1-2); owner of the local bar.
- Margeaux Lampley as Celine Connor (Series 1-2); Niall's wife.
- Olivia Caffrey as Barbara Kingsley (Series 1-2); a mysterious figure who is out to get Jean.
- Jacqueline Berces as Gendarme Richárd; Inspecteur Caron's subordinate.
- Sanchia McCormack as Charlie Brodeur; co-owner of a local antiques business.
- Djinda Kane as Simone Brodeur; Charlie's wife.
- Narayan David Hecter as Xavier Beauchamp (Series 1); Gloria's son.
- Alaïs Lawson as Claudette Hayes (Series 1); Dom's daughter.
- Avant Strangel as Cooper McGraw (Series 2-3); A love interest for Gloria.

== Series overview ==
| Series | Episodes | Originally released | |
| Series | Episodes | First released | Last released |
|---|---|---|---|
| 1 | 6 | 16 October 2021 | 20 November 2021 |
| Special | 1 | 22 December 2022 | |
| 2 | 6 | 5 January 2023 | 9 February 2023 |
| Special | 1 | 22 December 2023 | |
| 3 | 6 | 4 January 2024 | 8 February 2024 |
| Special | 1 | 24 December 2024 | |
| 4 | 6 | 20 March 2025 | 24 April 2025 |
| Special | 1 | 23 December 2025 | |
| 5 | 6 | 29 October 2026 | TBA |

== Episodes ==
=== Series 1 (2021) ===
| No. overall | No. in series | Title | Directed by | Written by | Original release date | UK viewers (millions) 7 day | UK viewers (millions) 28 day |
|---|---|---|---|---|---|---|---|
| 1 | 1 | "Episode 1" | Dermot Boyd | Sally Lindsay & Sue Vincent | 16 October 2021 | N/A | TBA |
When her husband is killed in a mysterious car crash, antiques dealer Jean White travels to Saint Victoire to find out the truth of what happened.
| 2 | 2 | "Episode 2" | Dermot Boyd | Sally Lindsay & Sue Vincent | 23 October 2021 | N/A | TBA |
An elderly woman believes that a precious treasure holds the key to finding her missing brother, who was kidnapped by the Nazis during the Second World War, and Jean seeks Dom's help to reunite the siblings.
| 3 | 3 | "Episode 3" | Dermot Boyd | Sally Lindsay & Sue Vincent | 30 October 2021 | N/A | TBA |
Tragedy strikes when Judith and Jeremy throw a 1980s-themed 35th wedding anniversary party. Jeremy's brother and sister-in-law, Harry and Cressida, and Judith's sister, Mary, are all suspects - and it's up to Jean and Dom to work out which of them could be responsible.
| 4 | 4 | "Episode 4" | Dermot Boyd | Sally Lindsay & Sue Vincent | 6 November 2021 | N/A | TBA |
Jean finds herself investigating a painting scam when a local man arrives at Charlie and Simone's pawn shop demanding his money back on a fake painting. Meanwhile, Albert Gilbert is left unconscious by robbers when a rare painting is stolen from his home, and Caron calls upon Jean for her expertise in the investigation of the theft.
| 5 | 5 | "Episode 5" | Dermot Boyd | Sally Lindsay & Sue Vincent | 13 November 2021 | N/A | TBA |
Caron enlists Jean and Dom's help when a valuable relic from the local church is stolen, and a priest is discovered murdered. Meanwhile, the Connors have an eventful week when Niall's mother Niamh pays a visit, and it quickly becomes apparent that she and Celine are not on amicable terms.
| 6 | 6 | "Episode 6" | Dermot Boyd | Sally Lindsay & Sue Vincent | 20 November 2021 | N/A | TBA |
Dom receives a surprise visitor on the night of his date with Jean, but as she prepares to leave for Manchester, she receives a nasty shock.

=== Christmas Special (2022) ===
| No. overall | No. in series | Title | Directed by | Written by | Original release date | UK viewers (millions) 7 day | UK viewers (millions) 28 day |
|---|---|---|---|---|---|---|---|
| 7 | 7 | "Christmas in Sainte Victoire" | Dermot Boyd | Sally Lindsay & Sue Vincent | 22 December 2022 | N/A | TBA |
Jingle bells are ringing as the spirit of Christmas fills the town, but it turns out not to be a happy one for Caron, when his wife is found murdered, with a knife in her back. Jean and Dom are forced to help police standards Insp. Gaultier prove that Caron was not the man responsible. Meanwhile, Dom's uncle Patrick (Tony Robinson) comes to stay.

=== Series 2 (2023) ===
| No. overall | No. in series | Title | Directed by | Written by | Original release date | UK viewers (millions) 7 day | UK viewers (millions) 28 day |
|---|---|---|---|---|---|---|---|
| 8 | 1 | "Episode 1" | Dermot Boyd | Sally Lindsay & Sue Vincent | 5 January 2023 | N/A | TBA |
Jeremy awakens from a night on the tiles to find himself in the cabin of his boat - and a dead woman on the deck. The deceased turns out to be an employee of celebrity chef Vernon Bradley (Lee Boardman). Although it appears her death was caused by a fall from a great height, Jean suspects some culinary involvement.
| 9 | 2 | "Episode 2" | Dermot Boyd | Sally Lindsay & Sue Vincent | 12 January 2023 | N/A | TBA |
Jean is approached to become patron of the local theatre after the sad death of one of the committee's founding members. When discussion of an unsolved death at the theatre back in the 1970s begins, a deadly pattern of events starts to unravel, culminating in the search for a priceless antique flower.
| 10 | 3 | "Episode 3" | Dermot Boyd | Sally Lindsay & Sue Vincent | 19 January 2023 | N/A | TBA |
Jeremy and Judith's renovation of a remote country mansion is halted when former owner Robert Coste is found shot at the dining table. He recently changed his will to remove all reference of his estranged son Eric, who immediately makes a bad impression on Jean & Dom; however, Eric's behaviour isn't the only test of their friendship.
| 11 | 4 | "Episode 4" | Dermot Boyd | Sally Lindsay & Sue Vincent | 26 January 2023 | N/A | TBA |
Newlyweds David (Les Dennis) and George (David Ames) find themselves requesting Jean's help after a mysterious wedding gift leaves them suffering from a run of bad luck. Meanwhile, the mysterious Barbara composes a letter to Charlie in an attempt to get her to visit Simone in prison.
| 12 | 5 | "Episode 5" | Dermot Boyd | Sally Lindsay & Sue Vincent | 2 February 2023 | N/A | TBA |
When reclusive rockstar Dura announces he is making a comeback, Jeremy offers up the Chateau as a recording studio - the perfect location for recording a comeback record. However, whilst locked in the studio on his own, Dura is murdered. Caron calls upon Jean and Dom to solve what appears to be an impossible puzzle.
| 13 | 6 | "Episode 6" | Dermot Boyd | Sally Lindsay & Sue Vincent | 9 February 2023 | N/A | TBA |
A perfume shop is robbed at gunpoint, the third in a series of robberies across southern France - and the gang appears elusive, until Gloria's new love interest, Cooper, is caught red-handed in possession of an antique mask used in the heist. Meanwhile, Barbara prepares to exact her final revenge on Jean.

=== Christmas Special (2023) ===
| No. overall | No. in series | Title | Directed by | Written by | Original release date | UK viewers (millions) 7 day | UK viewers (millions) 28 day |
|---|---|---|---|---|---|---|---|
| 14 | 1 | "Christmas Special" | Dermot Boyd | Sally Lindsay & Sue Vincent | 22 December 2023 | N/A | TBA |
As Christmas approaches, Judith and Jeremy arrange for the group to attend a murder-mystery night at a hotel with a spooky history. But when an actual murder takes place, a heavy rainstorm traps Jean inside with all the suspects.

=== Series 3 (2024) ===
| No. overall | No. in series | Title | Directed by | Written by | Original release date | UK viewers (millions) 7 day | UK viewers (millions) 28 day |
|---|---|---|---|---|---|---|---|
| 15 | 1 | "Ocean" | Dermot Boyd | Sally Lindsay & Sue Vincent | 4 January 2024 | N/A | TBA |
Judith and Jeremy have loaned their boat to a group of marine biologists. While diving, Gary, one of the experts, discovers a rare gold coin and pockets it, but tragedy soon strikes when he goes into cardiac arrest in the water. Caron shows Jean the treasure and enlists her help to investigate the death. Was this team of scientists really combing the seabed for minerals or could something else have led to Gary's demise?
| 16 | 2 | "Duel" | Dermot Boyd | Sally Lindsay & Sue Vincent | 11 January 2024 | N/A | TBA |
Gloria's dog discovers the body of a man with a fencing foil protruding from his chest, and in possession of a rare diamond-encrusted cufflink. Jean uncovers a story of honour and the last-ever duel to take place in Sainte Victoire.
| 17 | 3 | "Jackal" | Dermot Boyd | Sally Lindsay & Sue Vincent | 18 January 2024 | N/A | TBA |
When a woman is shot at a bus stop across the road from La Couronne, Caron is surprised to see her holding a carrier bag from Jean's shop. The victim was nanny to a single father's young daughter and the man is devastated - how will he break the news to his child about her much-loved carer?
| 18 | 4 | "Fashion" | Dermot Boyd | Sally Lindsay & Sue Vincent | 25 January 2024 | N/A | TBA |
Trendsetting fashion designer Violet Oliver (Lisa Faulkner) is releasing her new collection, so Judith offers the Chateau as the backdrop for the spectacle. But an unexpected technical glitch plunges Violet into darkness, causing her to fall from the balcony in a near-fatal plunge. Violet insists she was pushed, so Jean arranges discussions with two potential suspects - Lucia and Noemie.
| 19 | 5 | "Kidnap" | Dermot Boyd | Sally Lindsay & Sue Vincent | 1 February 2024 | N/A | TBA |
Judith's birthday celebration takes an unexpected turn when Jeremy orchestrates a surprise party at one of Sainte Victoire's finest restaurants. Among the guests are Jean, Dom, and Judith's lifelong friends, sisters Delphine and Nancy. The festive atmosphere takes a chilling turn when Nancy excuses herself to the restroom, only to be abruptly kidnapped.
| 20 | 6 | "Windows" | Dermot Boyd | Sally Lindsay & Sue Vincent | 8 February 2024 | N/A | TBA |
Thirty years after an eventful card game with a gangster, Patrick confides in Jean and Dom that he was responsible for identifying the villainous Sonny in a police line-up. Patrick knows the ex-con is threatening to come back to Sainte Victoire. And while Dom's health becomes a concern, Jean stumbles upon a surprising revelation about her past.

=== Christmas Special (2024) ===
| No. overall | No. in series | Title | Directed by | Written by | Original release date | UK viewers (millions) 7 day | UK viewers (millions) 28 day |
|---|---|---|---|---|---|---|---|
| 21 | 1 | "Christmas Special" | Dermot Boyd | Sally Lindsay & Sue Vincent | 24 December 2024 | N/A | TBA |

=== Series 4 (2025) ===
| No. overall | No. in series | Title | Directed by | Written by | Original release date | UK viewers (millions) 7 day | UK viewers (millions) 28 day |
|---|---|---|---|---|---|---|---|
| 22 | 1 | "Beach Club" | Dermot Boyd | Sally Lindsay & Sue Vincent | 20 March 2025 | N/A | TBA |
| 23 | 2 | "Inheritance" | Dermot Boyd | Sally Lindsay & Sue Vincent | 27 March 2025 | N/A | TBA |
| 24 | 3 | "Bad Education" | Dermot Boyd | Sally Lindsay & Sue Vincent | 3 April 2025 | N/A | TBA |
| 25 | 4 | "The Blueprint" | Dermot Boyd | Sally Lindsay & Sue Vincent | 10 April 2025 | N/A | TBA |
| 26 | 5 | "Antique Antics" | Dermot Boyd | Sally Lindsay & Sue Vincent | 17 April 2025 | N/A | TBA |
| 27 | 6 | "Where Eagles Dare" | Dermot Boyd | Sally Lindsay & Sue Vincent | 24 April 2025 | N/A | TBA |

=== Christmas Special (2025) ===
| No. overall | No. in series | Title | Directed by | Written by | Original release date | UK viewers (millions) 7 day | UK viewers (millions) 28 day |
|---|---|---|---|---|---|---|---|
| 28 | 1 | "Christmas Special" | Dermot Boyd | Sally Lindsay & Sue Vincent | 23 December 2025 | N/A | TBA |

=== Series 5 (2026) ===
| No. overall | No. in series | Title | Directed by | Written by | Original release date | UK viewers (millions) 7 day | UK viewers (millions) 28 day |
|---|---|---|---|---|---|---|---|
| 29 | 1 | "Fountain" | Dermot Boyd | Sally Lindsay & Sue Vincent | 29 October 2026 | TBD | TBA |
| 30 | 2 | "The Black Pearl" | Dermot Boyd | Sally Lindsay & Sue Vincent | 5 November 2026 | TBD | TBA |
| 31 | 3 | "The Returning Monstre" | Dermot Boyd | Sally Lindsay & Sue Vincent | 12 November 2026 | TBD | TBA |
| 32 | 4 | "The Show Must Go On" | TBC | Sally Lindsay & Sue Vincent | 19 November 2026 | TBD | TBA |
| 32 | 5 | "All's Fair in Love & War" | TBC | Sally Lindsay & Sue Vincent | 26 November 2026 | TBD | TBA |

== Reception ==
The i Paper called the series "the worst kind of cosy escapism" and "escapism of the most undemanding variety, a sort of Place in the Sun with added murder and a side-order of Benidorm."

Metacritic wrote of "A warm, inviting atmosphere and a group of characters that we enjoy spending time with. The mysteries themselves are hit and miss, but that tends to be the SOP for cozy mysteries like these."

Good Housekeeping magazine wrote: "Yes, it's up there with some of the best cosy crime dramas on TV in our opinion. It's escapist, original and incredibly easy to watch."

The Daily Herald called the episodes "a delight".
