= Montana (2014 film) =

British action film

- Directed by: Mo Ali
- Screenplay by: Jeremy Sheldon; Peter Lowe
- Story by: Peter Lowe
- Produced by: Mark Foligno. Gareth Maxwell Roberts
- Starring: McKell David; Lars Mikkelsen
- Cinematography: Jean-Paul Seresin
- Edited by: Kim Gaster
- Music by: Toydrum
- Production company: Entertainment One
- Distributed by: Entertainment One
- Release date: 11 December 2014
- Running time: 108 minutes
- Country: United Kingdom
- Language: English

Montana is a 2014 British action film directed by Mo Ali set in the East End of London starring McKell David as the title character in his first lead role in a feature film. He has since been in the TV series Holby City as Lloyd Kramer. The score was composed by Toydrum.

== Plot ==
A 14-year-old drug-runner called Montana (McKell David) gets haunted by crime lord Lazarus. Facing death, he is rescued by ex-Serbian Commando Dimitrije (Lars Mikkelsen), a man with a dark past who wants to destroy Lazarus and his criminal empire. Dimitrije trains Montana to be an assassin, and they plan their revenge on Lazarus to wipe him out for good.

== Cast ==
- McKell David as Montana
- Lars Mikkelsen as Dimitrije
- Michelle Fairley as DCI Rachel Jones
- Duane Henry as Junior
- Dominique Tipper as Mohawk
- Ashley Walters as Ryan
- Alexandra Weaver as Danica
- Kedar Williams-Stirling as Lorenzo
- Oliver Stark as Cal
- Zlatko Buric as Slavko
- Adam Deacon as Pitt
- Ryan Oliva as Branko
- Richie Campbell as Isaac
- Sinead Michael as Jess
- Rocky Marshall as DC Liam West
- Darrell D'Silva as Lazarus
- Eddie Bagayawa as The Chinaman

== Production ==
Shooting of the film took six weeks on locations all over London, including Hackney, Poplar, Brick Lane, Whitechapel, Greenwich, during February and March 2013.

On casting of McKell David, director Mo Ali said: "From the first time I met McKell David, I knew I'd found my Montana."

Review from Independent reads: "Director Mo Ali has an obvious flair for action – but little instinct for story or characterisation. At times, his new film plays like an episode of Grange Hill, as if directed by Quentin Tarantino."

== Reception ==
Empire Magazine gave it 3/5 stars in their review: "Tougher than a box of nails, this is a brassy revenge thriller that refuses to pull its punches."
