= Kerry Godliman =

English actress and comedian (born 1973)

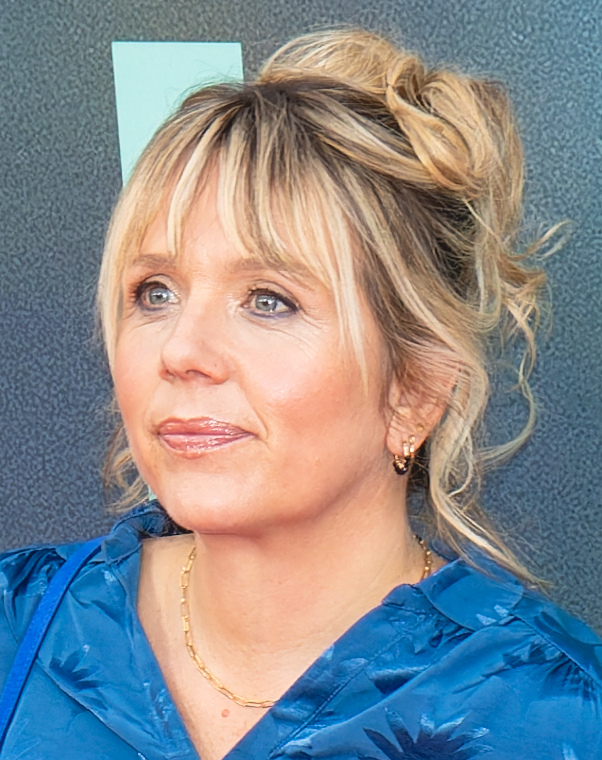
- Godliman in 2024
- Born: Kerry Anna Godliman; 1973 (age 52–53); Perivale, London, England
- Education: Rose Bruford College
- Occupations: Actress; comedian
- Years active: 1998–present
- Spouse: Ben Abell
- Children: 2
- Website: kerrygodliman.com

Kerry Anna Godliman (born 1973) is an English actress and comedian. She has appeared in TV roles in Derek, Bad Move, and After Life.

== Early life and education ==
Kerry Anna Godliman was born in 1973 in Perivale, West London.

She trained at Rose Bruford College in South London.

== Career ==
=== Television ===
In the first decade of the 2000s, Godliman appeared in a variety of television productions, including Spoons, Law of the Playground, Rush Hour, Michael McIntyre's Comedy Roadshow, and Home Time. She played Hannah in Ricky Gervais's Channel 4 sitcom Derek, Belinda Dawes in Our Girl, and Liz Carter in Carters Get Rich.

In 2017, Godliman landed the role of Nicky in the ITV sitcom Bad Move and in 2018, she played Peggy Aytean in the Channel 4 computer game series Rob Beckett's Playing for Time. The same year, she won the seventh series of Dave's comedy game show Taskmaster, beating James Acaster, Jessica Knappett, Phil Wang, and Rhod Gilbert. Between 2017 and 2019, she made a number of appearances on the celebrity panel show Mock the Week.

In 2019, Godliman appeared as Lisa in Ricky Gervais's black comedy series After Life. She reprised her role in series two and three, in 2020 and 2022, respectively. A year later, she played ex-MP Stella Maitland in the Channel 4 four-part drama series Adult Material. Since 2021, she has portrayed the lead character Pearl Nolan in the mystery series Whitstable Pearl. Since 2022, she has appeared in the crime thriller series Trigger Point.

=== Radio ===
In August 2014, Godliman made her first appearance on the long-running BBC Radio 4 quiz Just a Minute. In 2017, she starred alongside Stephanie Cole in an episode of John Finnemore's Double Acts on Radio 4 and (with Marcus Brigstocke) in The Wilsons Save the World.

She also appeared as a guest on the satirical radio show The Now Show to reflect on International Women's Day on 10 March 2017, and took part in episodes 3 and 4 of I'm Sorry I Haven't a Clue, series 70, that were recorded in Woking. She has appeared on The News Quiz.

=== Stand-up comedy ===
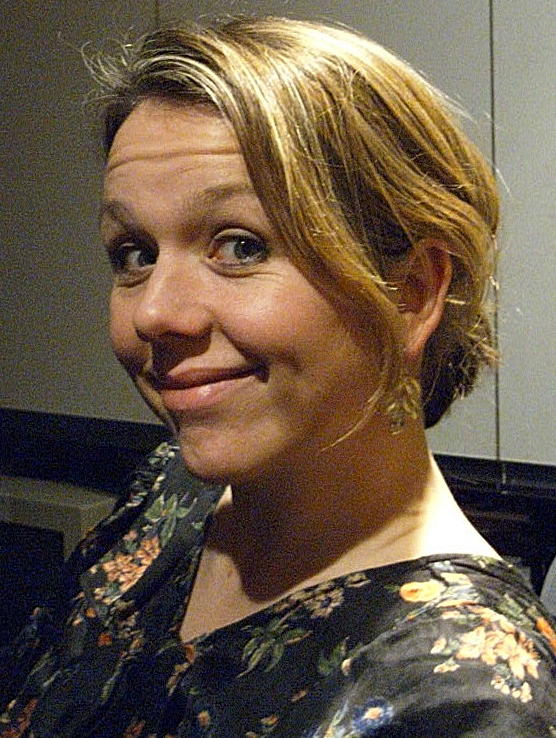
Godliman in 2011

Godliman has performed as a stand-up comedian throughout her career, including several appearances on Live at the Apollo, and she tours in this capacity. In January 2022, she performed her show Bosh at Blackheath Halls, London. In a review for The Guardian, writer Brian Logan praised the show, rating it 3/5 stars, and stating that the performance is filled with "vigour, charm and plenty [of] good gags". Godliman's tour was expected to last several months across the UK.

== Personal life ==
Godliman is married to actor Ben Abell. They have two children and as of 2020 live in South London.

== Selected filmography ==
=== Film ===
List of film appearances, with year, title, and role shown
Year	Title	Role	Notes
2016	Mascots	Sarah Golly	
2017	The Mercy	Bear and Swan Landlady	
2024	We Live in Time	Jane	
2025	Spinal Tap II: The End Continues	Hope Faith	

=== Television ===
List of television appearances, with year, title, and role shown
Year	Title	Role	Notes
1998	Casualty	WPC	Series 13; episode 9: "Public Service"
1999	The Knock	Tammy	Series 4; episode 4
1999	Daylight Robbery	Nurse	Series 1; episode 2
2003	Murder in Mind	DC Rhys	Series 3; episode 4: "Suicide"
2003	Holby City	Karen Donnelly	Series 5; episode 45: "On the Inside"
2004	The Bill	Lisa Turner	Series 20; episode 1: "Trust Means Nothing"
2005	My Hero	Receptionist	Series 5; episode 1: "The Foresight Saga"
2005	The Quatermass Experiment	Mrs. Matthews	Television film
2005	Spoons	Various characters	Episodes 1–6
2006–2008	Law of the Playground	Herself	Series 1 & 2; 13 episodes
2007	Gina's Laughing Gear		Episode 3: "Driving Me Mad"
2007	Rush Hour	Competitive mum / Rock dad's wife	Episodes 1–6
2007	Extras	Floor manager	Series 2; episode 7: "The Extra Special Series Finale"
2008	Poppy Shakespeare	Verna	Television film
2009	Doctors	Tonya Potter	Series 10; episode 215: "Cows"
2009	Home Time	Becky Hogg	Episodes 1–6
2010	Miranda	Michelle	Series 2; episode 1: "The New Me"
2011	Silk	PC Wendy Banks	Series 1; episode 2: "High and Dry"
2011	Life's Too Short	Neighbour	Series 1; episode 4
2012	White Van Man	WPC Winslow	Series 2; episode 6: "Crime and Punishment"
2012	Dead Boss	Mrs. Cole	Mini-series; episode 1
2012	Getting On	Tania Barfoot	Series 3; episode 2
2012–2014	Derek	Hannah	Series 1 & 2; 14 episodes
2013	Mayday	Amelia	Mini-series; episodes 2 & 5
2013	Frankie	Nicky Humphries	Episode 6
2013	Him & Her	Lorraine	Series 4; episode 1: "The Morning"
2013–2014	Our Girl	Belinda Dawes	Television film (pilot) and series 1; 3 episodes
2015	The Delivery Man	Linda Fisher	Episode 1: "Youth"
2015	Crackanory	Connie	Series 3; episode 6: "Unlucky for Sam & Bob's House"
2016	Moving On	Mel	Series 7; episode 3: "A Picture of Innocence"
2016	Comedy Playhouse	Cathy	Series 17; episode 3: "Stop/Start"
2016	Jack and Dean of All Trades	Ellen	Series 1; episode 3: "Dad Men"
2016	Murder in Successville	Helen	Series 2; episode 6: "Memoirs"
2017	Carters Get Rich	Liz Carter	Episodes 1–6
2017–2018	Bad Move	Nicky Rawlings	Series 1 & 2; 9 episodes
2018	Damned	Beth Grimond (headmistress)	Series 2; episode 2
2018	Bliss	Elise	Episodes 2 & 5
2018	Rob Beckett's Playing for Time	Peggy Aytean	Episodes 1–4
2018–2020	Save Me	Teens	Series 1 & 2; 10 episodes
2018–2022	Taskmaster	Herself – contestant	Series 7; episodes 1–10, series 9; episode 5, Champion of Champions II special
2019	Call the Midwife	Ena Schroeder	Series 8; episode 8
2019	Treadstone	Carol	Episodes 1 & 6: "The Cicada Protocol" and "The Hades Awakening"
2019–2021	Frayed	Bambi / Bunny	Series 1; episode 1, and series 2; episode 3
2019–2022	After Life	Lisa Johnson	Series 1–3; 18 episodes
2020	Richard Osman's House of Games	Herself – contestant	Series 3; episodes 66–70 (week 14)
2020	Adult Material	Stella Maitland	Episodes 1–4
2021–2024	Whitstable Pearl	Pearl Nolan	Series 1–3; 18 episodes
2022	The Undeclared War	Angie McMurray	Series 1; episodes 4–6
2022–	Trigger Point	Sonya Reeves	Series 1–3; 14 episodes
2026	The Witness	Grandma June	2 episodes
2026	Alley Cats	Lara (voice)	6 episodes
TBA	Dalziel & Pascoe	DI Andrea Dalziel	Filming
