= Sue Vincent =

British actress and writer

- Born: Lancashire, England, UK
- Occupations: Actress; writer
- Years active: 1996–present

Sue Vincent is a British actress and writer.

== Career ==
Vincent spent three years training in acting and musical theatre from 1991 to 1994 before first appearing on stage in 1996. Her first television role was as Anne Bevitt in Casualty. Since then, Vincent has become known for her roles in comedy series such as Shameless (2013), Mount Pleasant (2011–2017) and Bad Move, (2017–2018).

She has also appeared in soap operas such as EastEnders, Coronation Street and Doctors, and in drama series such as The Amazing Mrs Pritchard, Monday Monday and Identity. As a writer, she has written alongside her Mount Pleasant co-star Sally Lindsay and as a member of The Comedy Project. She has also written numerous plays for Soho Theatre. In 2019, she appeared in the Mrs. Brown's Boys Christmas special as Peggy Piper.

In 2014, she was cast as Sadie in a stage production of the Jim Cartwright-penned play The Rise and Fall of Little Voice at the Derby Theatre in Derby; she reprised the role in a 2019 production of the play opposite actor Ted Robbins at the Octagon Theatre in Bolton.

In January 2021, Vincent and writing partner Sally Lindsay were commissioned by Channel 5 and Acorn TV to write a 6-part television thriller series. The series, The Madame Blanc Mysteries (originally titled The Reluctant Madame Blanc), was directed by Dermot Boyd and Vincent also co-starred.

== Filmography ==
Year	Title	Role	Notes
2004	Casualty	Anne Bevitt	Episode: "Fallen Hero"
2004	If...	Liz Downe	
2004	EastEnders	Receptionist	
2005	Two Pints of Lager and a Packet of Crisps	Valerie	Episode: "Ecuador"
2005	William and Mary	Pauline	Series 3, Episode 4
2005	Funland	Trixie	Pilot
2006	Mayo	Annie Wilson	Episode: "A Sunset Touch"
2006, 2008, 2009, 2013	Coronation Street	Midwife	8 episodes
2006	The Amazing Mrs Pritchard	Kimberley	Episode 1 & 2
2007	Thieves Like Us	Lecherous date	Episode: "Office Job"
2007	Grownups	Registrar	Episode: "Moose"
2007	The Everglades		
2008	Jam & Jerusalem	Ida's daughter	Episode: "Website"
2008	Lab Rats	Protestor	Episode: "A Protest"
2008	Coming Up	Veronica	Episode: "Thinspiration"
2009	Monday Monday	Helen	Episode 5
2009	Office Politics	Legal client	Short
2010	Identity	Female foster parent	Episode: "Second Life"
2011	Midsomer Murders	Matron Lynch	Episode: "Dark Secrets"
2011	BBC Nought	Antonia Davies	Episode: "Question Time: The After Party"
2011	Law & Order	Cathy Christie	Episode: "Intent"
2011	BBC Nought	Claire	Episode: "MasterChef: The Profezzionals"
2011–2017	Mount Pleasant	Margaret Harris	24 episodes
2011	Dani's House	Beeferella	Episode: "The Big Grapple"
2011	Rise of the Appliances		
2011	Fresh Meat	Mrs. Lamb	Series 1, Episode 8
2011	Spy	Court Usher	Episode: "Codename: Portis"
2012	Prisoners' Wives	Nicki	Series 1, Episodes 1 and 5
2012	All in Good Time	Woman at airport	Film
2012	Some Girls	Miss Jacobs	Series 1, Episode 2
2013	The Job Lot	Suzi Bagley	Series 1, Episode 3
2013	Shameless	Derilee	8 episodes
2013	Quick Cuts	Customer	Episode 1
2013	Bad Education	Joy	Episode: "Swimming Gala"
2013	The Slammer	Clarissa Swift	Episode: "A Monster Problem"
2014, 2016	Holby City	Annie Hambleton/Mia Rowbert	Episodes: "Not Waving But Drowning"/"Out of Sight Out of Mind"
2016	Hoff the Record	Annabelle	Episode: "Wedding"
2016	Doctors	Tracey Mears	Episode: "Slings and Arrows"
2017–2018	Bad Move	Shannon	9 episodes
2019	Ladhood	Session leader	Episode: "The First Time"
2019	Mrs. Brown's Boys	Peggy Piper	Episode: "Orange Is The New Mammy"
2020	The Worst Witch	Miss Splinter	Episode: "The Witching Hour: Part 1"
2021	Alma's Not Normal	Trish	2 episodes
2021–Present	The Madame Blanc Mysteries	Gloria	27 episodes
2023	Waterloo Road	Erica Thorn	series 11
2023	Significant Other	Gina	Episode 1
2023	The Full Monty	Deirdre Blakefield	Episode: “Supply Chain Economics”
2023	Blindspot	Dolly	4 episodes
2024	Comedy Blaps	Jackie	Episode: “Break Clause”
2025	Comedy Blaps	Margaret	Episode: “The Pharmacy”
