= Harrison Osterfield =

English actor (born 1996)

- Born: 4 July 1996 (age 30); Surrey, England
- Education: Caterham School; BRIT School
- Alma mater: London Academy of Music and Dramatic Art
- Occupation: Actor
- Years active: 2014–present

Harrison John Osterfield (born 4 July 1996) is a British actor and model. He first gained prominence through his supporting role as Snowden in the miniseries Catch-22 (2019). He then starred as Leopold in the Netflix series The Irregulars (2021).

== Early life and education ==
Osterfield was born in Surrey, United Kingdom and raised near West Sussex with his younger sister, Charlotte. From 2008 to 2014, he attended Caterham School as a boarding student, participating in the drama club and starring in school plays. This inspired him to pursue acting, and he subsequently enrolled in the BRIT School, where he met and became close friends with Tom Holland. He was then accepted into the foundation course at the London Academy of Music and Dramatic Art.

== Career ==
When Holland was cast as Spider-Man in the Marvel Cinematic Universe, Osterfield was brought on to be his personal assistant on two movies, and made minor cameos in the films which starred Holland.

In June 2018, it was announced that he had been cast in a minor role on the 2019 Hulu adaptation of Catch-22 directed by George Clooney. Also in 2019, he created a comedy podcast called Village People with his friend Greg Birks. They voice the characters Simon and Mark, who interview the residents of their fictional English hometown.

In October 2019, he was cast in his first lead role in the 2021 Netflix series The Irregulars. The series premiered in March 2021 and was cancelled in May of that year.

== Filmography ==
=== Film ===
Year	Title	Role	Notes
2014	Trepidation	Orphan	Short film
2015	Supply and Demand	Edward Lucas	Short film
2015	Colours	Football Player	Short film
2017	Ethan Adler's Guide to Homicide	Ethan Adler	Short film
2017	One in a Million	Spooner	Short film
2017	Spider-Man: Homecoming	Midtown Student	Uncredited
2018	Avengers: Infinity War	Boy on Bus	Uncredited
2018	Vent	Parker	Short Film
2021	Chaos Walking	Farnbranch Man	Uncredited
2022	A Woman at Night	Jake	
2023	After Everything	James	
2026	Pressure	Sergeant Mickey McKeogh	

=== Television ===
Year	Title	Role	Notes
2019	Catch-22	Snowden	Episode: "Episode 6"
2021	The Irregulars	Leopold	Main role
TBA	The Phoebus Files	Jonathan	
