= Three Day Millionaire =

2022 British comedy film

- Directed by: Jack Spring
- Written by: Paul Stephenson
- Produced by: Jack Spring, Giles Alderson, Lucinda Rhodes Thakrar
- Starring: Colm Meaney, Jonas Armstrong, James Burrows, Robbie Gee
- Edited by: Kevin Chicken
- Release date: 2022
- Running time: 93 minutes
- Country: United Kingdom
- Language: English

Three Day Millionaire is a 2022 British comedy film directed by Jack Spring and written by Paul Stephenson.

== Cast ==
- Colm Meaney as Mr Barr
- Jonas Armstrong as Mr Graham
- Robbie Gee as Wheezy
- James Burrows as Curly
- Michael Kinsey as Codge
- Sam Glen as Budgie
- Melissa Batchelor as Demi

== Production ==
Director Jack Spring and Writer Paul Stephenson began working on the project in 2018, with Spring's family hailing from Grimsby and Stephenson being raised in nearby Hull. Spring said in 2022 'I wanted to tell the story of the town's real identity, rather than just the lazy tropes of 'it's not a nice area' or 'it's got nothing.

In an interview with The Filmmakers Podcast, Spring explained that the film is set, shot and financed in Grimsby, ‘in every single frame. It’s where all my dad’s side of the family are from.’ Later adding ‘The negative of Grimsby, when we were filming there, is that if you’re a professional in the film/ TV world, you probably don’t live in Grimsby; but we really did get everyone involved as was humanly possible.’

In an interview with British Cinematographer Magazine, Three Day Millionaire DoP Andrew Rodger shared 'It’s like a backlot... there are these beautiful, empty, industrial breath-taking vistas and the sea is always there', when asked about his preparations for shooting the project in Grimsby. He continued to detail the area's architecture, stating 'the houses in Grimsby are these tiny, thin things from the street, then they go on forever with big, high ceilings – really beautiful houses. We walked around with our mouths open and went, yeah, we can shoot here.'

The film began shooting in September 2021 in Grimsby. One scene show the main character looking at a picture in a pub, which is the 'Wine Pipe' in Grimsby on Freeman Street, it was painted by local artist Kenny King, who add locals who worked on the docks.

== Critical reception ==
Cath Clarke, writing for The Guardian, claimed that although James Burrows brings "cheeky-chappie warmth" to the character Curly, the film is "charmless at times, and difficult to warm to" further noting that "sense of what’s at stake" is missing.

Although still critical of the project, Phil Slatter of fancarpet looked upon the film more favourably, writing 'The central idea may not be entirely original (and neither are the twists when it unfolds) but with some good humour and likeable characters that is no problem'. This is a sentiment echoed by several critics, claiming Three Day Millionaire to be predictable in parts, but not be without charm or humour.

== Release ==
The film was released in select cinemas and on digital platforms in the UK on 25 November 2022. The film was released in the US and Canada on 21 February 2023. The Film was released on Netflix in the UK on 25 February 2023.
