= McKell David =

British actor (born 1997)

- Born: McKell Celaschi-David; London, England
- Education: Identity School of Acting
- Occupation: Actor
- Years active: 2011–present

McKell Celaschi-David is a British actor. He began his career in an episode of the Channel 4 anthology Black Mirror (2011). His films include My Brother the Devil (2012) and Montana (2014). On television, he is known for his role as Spike in the Netflix series The Irregulars (2021).

== Early life ==
Coming from a multicultural family with roots in Barbados, Italy, Liberia, and Japan. From an early age, he demonstrated a talent for performance, initially showcased through unscripted YouTube videos filmed by his father. He later honed his craft at London's Identity School of Acting. David launched his YouTube show, The Adventures of Lil McKell, at age 12. David reminisced, "Every time I think back to the character "Lil McKell", it's always warm memories. I think that era of YouTube is very nostalgic, alongside the likes of Jazzy, A Squeezy, and myself".

== Career ==
=== 2011–2013: Early roles ===
David began his career with a guest appearance in 2011 episode of the Channel 4 anthology series Black Mirror, created by Charlie Brooker. In January 2012, he starred as Demon's Boy in the British crime drama film My Brother the Devil. Following the release of Black Mirror and My Brother the Devil, David revealed that he created prank and sketch videos, which achieved moderate success and subsequently led him to attend open auditions for films. My Brother the Devil, received positive reviews. Later that year, he had a small role in the BBC Three series Some Girls. In March 2013, he played Dean in the BBC One military drama series Our Girl.

=== 2014–present: Breakthrough ===
In February 2014, David guest starred as Zac Forester in two episodes of Suspects on Channel 5. In December 2014, he starred as the titular character in the action film Montana. In the movie, David played a 14-year-old drug-runner haunted by crime lord Lazarus, facing death, and was rescued by ex-Serbian Commando Dimitrije.

In October 2015, David joined the cast of the BBC One medical soap opera Holby City for its seventeenth series as Lloyd Kramer, appearing in episodes 14 to 19. He also appeared on Don't Grow Up as Liam and in the coming-of-age drama Urban Hymn as Ryan.

David starred as Nathan in the 2016 television film Damilola, Our Loved Boy alongside Babou Ceesay and Wunmi Mosaku. David played Hazzard in the 2017 science fiction superhero film iBoy.

David played Mikey in the 2018 comedy film Patrick. He had a minor role in the 2019 gangster film The Gentlemen.

In 2021, David had a main television role as Spike in the Netflix mystery adventure series The Irregulars.
