= Rae Earl =

English writer and broadcaster

- Born: Rachel Earl; 13 December 1971 (age 54); Stamford, Lincolnshire, England
- Other names: Rae Earl Johnson, Rachel Earl Johnson
- Occupations: Writer, broadcaster
- Spouse: Kevin Johnson
- Children: 1

Rachel Earl (born 13 December 1971) is an English writer and broadcaster. She is best known as the author of the 2007 book My Fat, Mad Teenage Diary, a collection of the diaries she wrote as a teenager which was later adapted into the E4 comedy-drama series My Mad Fat Diary (2013–2015)

== Early life ==
Earl was born and raised in Stamford, Lincolnshire. She attended Stamford High School. She obtained a degree from Hull University and won the university's Philip Larkin literary prize in 1994.

== Career ==
After university, Earl worked as a copywriter in local radio before moving into radio presenting.

She is the author of the 2007 book My Fat, Mad Teenage Diary (published in the U.S. as My Mad Fat Diary in 2016), a collection of the diaries she wrote as a teenager in the late 1980s. The diary describes the tribulations of being a fat girl with mental health difficulties, who lives in a council house with her mother and her mother's new Moroccan boyfriend. A follow-up book, My Madder Fatter Diary Vol. 2, was published in 2014.

The E4 comedy-drama series My Mad Fat Diary (2013–2015) was based on her books. Unlike the books, the series took place in the 1990s rather than the 1980s.

== Personal life ==
Earl lives in the Australian city of Hobart and is married to Kevin Johnson. They have a son named Harry.

Earl participated in Hard Quiz Live at the Theatre Royal, Hobart on November 12, 2022. Her expert subject was Princess Diana and she eventually won the show, taking away the limited edition brass mug.

== Works ==
=== Novels ===
- OMG! Is This Actually My Life? Hattie Moore's Unbelievable Year! (2013) - Fictional diary of a teenage girl who lives in Derby.
- OMG! I'm in Love with a Geek! (2014)
- My Life Uploaded (2018)
- My Life Gone Viral (2020)

=== Nonfiction ===
- My Fat, Mad Teenage Diary (2007); published in the U.S as My Mad Fat Diary (2016)
- My Madder Fatter Diary Vol. 2 (2014)
- It's All in Your Head: A Guide to Getting Your Sh*t Together (2017); published in the U.S. as Your Brain Needs a Hug: Life, Love, Mental Health, and Sandwiches (2019)
