= List of Mount Pleasant episodes =

Mount Pleasant is a British comedy-drama which first aired on Sky 1 on 24 August 2011. The show moved to Sky Living in 2012, before moving back to Sky 1 in 2015 until the shows ending in 2017. The show is about the day-to-day life of the main character Lisa, her husband, her dad, as well as neighbours and colleagues. Each episode is an hour long (including adverts) and takes place in various locations, including the cul-de-sac Lisa lives in, her workplace, local pub The Dog and Dart, and more.

== Series overview ==
Series	Episodes	Originally released	
Series	Episodes	First released	Last released
1	8	24 August 2011	12 October 2011
2	9	22 August 2012	17 October 2012
Special		23 December 2012	
3	8	11 September 2013	30 October 2013
4	8	16 September 2014	4 November 2014
5	8	11 September 2015	30 October 2015
6	10	30 August 2016	1 November 2016
Special		30 June 2017	

== Episodes ==
=== Series 1 (2011) ===
No. overall	No. in series	Title	Directed by	Written by	Original release date	Viewers (millions)
1	1	"Episode One"	Dewi Humphreys	Sarah Hooper	24 August 2011	0.93
As Lisa and Dan's 10th wedding anniversary approaches, she's convinced he'll have forgotten. That is, if she's not talked him into an affair with a neighbour. Meanwhile, Shelley's marriage is on the rocks - who'd have a best friend for a boss?
2	2	"Episode Two"	Dewi Humphreys	Sarah Hooper	31 August 2011	0.83
Lisa's self-esteem is crushed when the design of her top makes people think she is pregnant, and Dan tries to convince her she does not need to go on a diet as rumours of her alleged condition spread through the cul-de-sac. Meanwhile, Denise gets a date with new resident Jack, and Kate is troubled by news that the police are investigating her husband's death.
3	3	"Episode Three"	Dewi Humphreys	Sarah Hooper	7 September 2011	0.95
Lisa finds herself looking after Dan following his hernia operation, and her stress levels reach breaking point when Pauline visits. However, an invitation to lunch from Jack brightens her day. Meanwhile, Shelley confronts Greg when her bank balance is cleared and Denise confesses she has been sleeping with Fergus again.
4	4	"Episode Four"	Dewi Humphreys	Sarah Hooper	14 September 2011	0.80
Lisa asks Dan to point out his favourite part of her body, but his answer is not as successful as he hoped, and tension mounts when Bianca invites all of her friends to a hot-tub party in celebration of Jack's birthday. Meanwhile, Shelley cannot hide her feelings about Denise and Fergus getting back together, and Greg asks Dan to lend him money.
5	5	"Episode Five"	Dominic Leclerc	Sarah Hooper	21 September 2011	0.87
Lisa catches her mother-in-law shoplifting and confronts her, while Greg believes he has found a solution to his financial woes in a loan shark. Sue misinterprets what happens between Barry and another woman.
6	6	"Episode Six"	Dominic Leclerc	Sarah Hooper	28 September 2011	0.76
Lisa and Dan's house is burgled and the culprit takes a cherished wedding photograph - so Barry begins an investigation. Fergus tells Denise his wife is unable to have children, and claims he wants to start again, while Bianca throws a neighbourhood party.
7	7	"Episode Seven"	Dominic Leclerc	Sarah Hooper	5 October 2011	0.79
Barry and Sue prepare for their 40th anniversary, but the impression of enduring marital bliss slips when Jack persistently tries to talk about an intimate moment they shared. Meanwhile, Kate has a heart-to-heart with Dan, and Denise tells Fergus she is having the baby alone and only wants him to keep her job open. Plus, Emma calls time on Greg's loan, and Shelley discovers he was not really mugged.
8	8	"Episode Eight"	Dominic Leclerc	Sarah Hooper	12 October 2011	0.95
The day of Barry and Sue's anniversary party arrives, and Lisa and Dan are struggling to keep up the pretence that they are still a couple. Shelly has had enough of Greg's lies and talks to him about their future, while Denise decides she just wants to be alone - but is still flattered by the advances of a man in her birthing class.

=== Series 2 (2012) ===
No. overall	No. in series	Title	Directed by	Written by	Original release date	Viewers (millions)
9	1	"Episode One"	Dewi Humphreys	Sarah Hooper	22 August 2012	0.46
Lisa and Dan have put the past behind them and their relationship seems to be on track, but a new friend leads her astray, while Bianca's stepson Gary moves in.
10	2	"Episode Two"	Dewi Humphreys	Sarah Hooper	29 August 2012	0.38
Lisa faces problems in her marriage as Dan grows increasingly jealous of her growing friendship with Kim. Denise struggles to leave Joshua at home and return to work, Sue's contact with her sister Pam gets her thinking and Bianca's attempts to get Jim to spend more time with her and Gary prove fruitless. Meanwhile, the residents rally together in the face of a crisis.
11	3	"Episode Three"	Dewi Humphreys	Mark Brotherhood	5 September 2012	0.39
Dan is happy to see his father again, but Pauline insists she will not let him back in her life. Lisa is dismayed to discover Jack has been offered a job at Reconnect, while Fergus threatens Denise with legal action over access to Joshua.
12	4	"Episode Four"	Dewi Humphreys	Mark Brotherhood	12 September 2012	0.39
The cul-de-sac's new resident Chris sets Bianca's pulse racing when she helps him settle in. Dan reluctantly agrees to go on a double date with Lisa to meet Kim's husband, while Barry and Sue find a new hobby. Denise is troubled by a letter from Fergus's solicitor, and Charlie looks to make amends with Pauline.
13	5	"Episode Five"	Dermot Boyd	Sarah Hooper	19 September 2012	0.43
Barry tries to keep Sue happy during a shopping trip with his brother Terry and his wife Margaret, Chris grows closer to Bianca, while Pauline and Charlie go on a date. Elsewhere, Denise receives disappointing news from Fergus's solicitor, and Kim asks Greg to get together again, as well as making Lisa a tempting offer.
14	6	"Episode Six"	Dermot Boyd	Sarah Hooper	26 September 2012	0.42
As Lisa and Dan ride high on the excitement of their holiday, could there be more to the trip than meets the eye? Elsewhere, Denise drops a bombshell.
15	7	"Episode Seven"	Dermot Boyd	Mark Brotherhood	3 October 2012	0.36
Kate returns, hoping to make amends with her former friends, while Lisa plans a welcome home party for her parents, and the guests wonder whether love is in the air when Chris and Bianca turn up together, seemingly on a date.
16	8	"Episode Eight"	Ian Barnes	Mark Brotherhood	10 October 2012	0.39
Dan looks forward to the pub quiz and learns of an unsavoury secret in Chris's past, while Charlie takes a lonely Barry out for the night. Elsewhere, newly single Fergus tricks Denise into visiting him in his motel room, and Lisa decides to forgive Kate.
17	9	"Episode Nine"	Ian Barnes	Mark Brotherhood	17 October 2012	0.43
Dan is horrified when Lisa invites Chris and Bianca over for a dinner party, and things only get worse for him when Kate turns up to help with the cooking. Meanwhile, Denise finally allows Fergus to see baby Josh, but will she regret her decision?

=== Christmas special (2012) ===
No. overall	Title	Directed by	Written by	Original release date	Viewers (millions)
18	"Christmas Special"	Ian Barnes	Sarah Hooper	23 December 2012	0.46
It's Christmas Day but there's not much festive cheer for Lisa and Dan - she misses her parents, he buys the wrong presents and Pauline sticks her nose in where it isn't wanted. Meanwhile, Bianca spoils stepson Gary with an abundance of gifts, but she can't help but be disappointed when he refuses to join her in volunteering at Reverend Roger's homeless shelter - so Chris shows the teenager the error of his ways.

=== Series 3 (2013) ===
No. overall	No. in series	Title	Directed by	Written by	Original release date	Viewers (millions)
19	1	"Episode One"	Ian Barnes	Sarah Hooper	11 September 2013	0.49
The arrival of lively and outspoken Londoners Bradley and Tanya spells trouble for the residents of Mount Pleasant. The couple decide to throw a party to get to know their neighbours, although not everyone is in a celebratory mood as Lisa has unexpectedly lost her job, and Charlie and Pauline's wedding plans are up in the air.
20	2	"Episode Two"	Ian Barnes	Mark Brotherhood	18 September 2013	0.44
Lisa aims for the top of the career ladder, but a lack of formal qualifications is holding her back, while Fergus has a business proposal for Denise. Bianca gets a job at the pub, meaning she can spy on Gary's night out with Ella, and Dan finds himself getting cosy with glamorous new neighbour Tanya after their other halves pull out of a planned dinner party.
21	3	"Episode Three"	Ian Barnes	Sarah Hooper	25 September 2013	0.48
Lisa's power trip angers business partner Fergus and pushes husband Dan closer to Tanya, while things go awry when Charlie and Pauline go in search of wedding venues. Greg gets more than he bargained for with a drug dealer and Dan falls for the charms of his sultry neighbour.
22	4	"Episode Four"	Ian Barnes	Mark Brotherhood	2 October 2013	0.44
Tanya and Dan spend time together when Bradley goes away for the weekend and Lisa jets to Spain, but will the pair succumb to temptation on a night out? Meanwhile, Fergus moves in with Denise, Charlie and Pauline settle the issue of who will plan their wedding with a round of pool, and Greg gets in too deep working as a drug runner.
23	5	"Episode Five"	Dermot Boyd	Sarah Hooper	9 October 2013	0.60
Dan and Tanya face the repercussions of their hotel shenanigans, while Charlie and Pauline hope to profit from Barry's departure from the neighbourhood. Elsewhere, Greg learns that drug-dealer Gerry has been shot, and Denise keeps her career failure a secret from Fergus.
24	6	"Episode Six"	Dermot Boyd	Mark Brotherhood	16 October 2013	0.47
Dan's bad behaviour lands him in trouble with Lisa, while Terry and Margaret experience a dramatic car journey and Greg does a risky job for drug dealer Gerry. Elsewhere on the street, Denise learns that honesty is the best policy and Bianca thinks she may have found her vocation during a trip to a wedding cake shop with Charlie and Roger.
25	7	"Episode Seven"	Dermot Boyd	Mark Brotherhood	23 October 2013	0.58
Pauline and Charlie prepare for their hen and stag parties, but with Dan keeping the details of his father's bash under wraps, the lads are anxious about what he has planned. Meanwhile, Gary struggles to make progress with Ella, Denise comes clean to Fergus about her job and Greg tries to cut his ties with drug dealer Gerry.
26	8	"Episode Eight"	Dermot Boyd	Sarah Hooper	30 October 2013	0.51
Charlie and Pauline's wedding day arrives, but the situation isn't so rosy for Dan as Lisa packs her bags and vows to leave him for good. Desperately trying to salvage their relationship, he tries to convince her to forget his indiscretion with Tanya.

=== Series 4 (2014) ===
No. overall	No. in series	Title	Directed by	Written by	Original release date	Viewers (millions)
27	1	"Episode One"	Ian Barnes	Mark Brotherhood	16 September 2014	0.53
Lisa and Dan are stronger than ever, despite the presence of Tanya, the temptress next door.
28	2	"Episode Two"	Ian Barnes	Mark Brotherhood	23 September 2014	0.53
Dan has a bee in his bonnet about why Robbie left an apparently perfect life in the Big Apple for suburban Manchester.
29	3	"Episode Three"	Ian Barnes	Amy Roberts & Loren McLaughlan	30 September 2014	0.54
In Bradley's absence, Greg visits Tanya's home under the pretence of fitting a new kitchen.
30	4	"Episode Four"	Ian Barnes	Mark Brotherhood	7 October 2014	0.49
Bianca discovers a knack for giving advice when she has to play unlikely counsellor to one of Roger's troubled parishioners.
31	5	"Episode Five"	Dermot Boyd	Mark Brotherhood	14 October 2014	0.55
Tanya and Ella try to get their heads around Bradley's web of lies, while Robbie's are exposed.
32	6	"Episode Six"	Dermot Boyd	Mark Brotherhood	21 October 2014	N/A
A stormy atmosphere lingers over Mount Pleasant following Robbie's revelations.
33	7	"Episode Seven"	Dermot Boyd	Amy Roberts & Loren McLaughlan	28 October 2014	0.54
Temperatures continue to rise in Mount Pleasant as Greg and Tanya grow closer.
34	8	"Episode Eight"	Dermot Boyd	Mark Brotherhood	4 November 2014	N/A
Mount Pleasant is engulfed in panic in the tense series finale.

=== Series 5 (2015) ===
No. overall	No. in series	Title	Directed by	Written by	Original release date	Viewers (millions)
35	1	"Episode One"	Dermot Boyd	Mark Brotherhood	11 September 2015	0.63
The close welcomes much-in-love new neighbours Jenna and Cameron.
36	2	"Episode Two"	Dermot Boyd	Mark Brotherhood	18 September 2015	0.48
Dan and Cameron bravely attempt to establish some peace between Lisa and Jenna. Plus, the Dawsons are confronted by an all-too-familiar face from their past.
37	3	"Episode Three"	Dermot Boyd	Mark Brotherhood	25 September 2015	0.44
Dan starts to question new landlord Trevor's intentions towards his mother. Meanwhile, Lisa attempts to make the opening of her new office a day to remember.
38	4	"Episode Four"	Dermot Boyd	Mark Brotherhood	2 October 2015	0.47
Lisa attempts to outdo Jenna when they both throw birthday parties for their daughters on the same day. Greg tries to adjust to life with new flatmate Bradley.
39	5	"Episode Five"	Ian Barnes	Mark Brotherhood	9 October 2015	0.47
Having acknowledged their relationship woes, Lisa and Dan attempt to patch things up with a date night.
40	6	"Episode Six"	Ian Barnes	Mark Brotherhood	16 October 2015	0.45
Lisa and Jenna's feud reaches a head when an argument lands them behind bars.
41	7	"Episode Seven"	Ian Barnes	Mark Brotherhood	23 October 2015	0.52
As Lisa and Dan's marriage reaches crisis point, Lisa suggests they start to see a relationship counsellor.
42	8	"Episode Eight"	Ian Barnes	Mark Brotherhood	30 October 2015	N/A
There's a fiery end to Series 5.

=== Series 6 (2016) ===
±

No. overall	No. in series	Title	Directed by	Written by	Original release date	Viewers (millions)
43	1	"Episode One"	Dermot Boyd	Mark Brotherhood	30 August 2016	0.53
The new series kicks off with the opening of a revamped Dog and Dart pub, now under the ownership of Bradley, the former criminal, ex-husband to Tanya and the father of Ella. With this role, he has turned over a new leaf and promised Ella he will follow the right path. What could possibly go wrong?
44	2	"Episode Two"	Dermot Boyd	Mark Brotherhood	6 September 2016	0.56
Dan has news for Pauline but worries how she will take it. Finn's up to his usual tricks and sells a cut and shut car; meanwhile, Tanya and Greg argue about Bradley and it's awards time for Fersa. Fergus finds out the truth about Roger and an unexpected guest arrives at Fergus's place.
45	3	"Episode Three"	Dermot Boyd	Mark Brotherhood	13 September 2016	0.52
Pauline takes her job back at the Dog and Dart. Jane tells Fergus she has nowhere to go but Roger is suspicious of her. Greg asks Dan to be his best man and Denise and Nana both go on dates. Meanwhile Finn and Ella retrieve the cut and shut car from the impound, unaware they have been watched.
46	4	"Episode Four"	Dermot Boyd	Mark Brotherhood	20 September 2016	0.45
Roger is forced to look for a job, so Lisa finds him one at a call centre. Denty and Liam pay the garage an unexpected visit, but where is the car? Meanwhile, Tanya and Greg's wedding day has arrived, but first it's hen and stag do time. The boys indulge in a spot of poker, while the girls have a sleepover, which leads to an intoxicated Tanya slipping off to see Bradley...
47	5	"Episode Five"	Ian Barnes	Mark Brotherhood	27 September 2016	0.50
Pauline receives some heartbreaking news, while Roger begins his first day at work. Elsewhere, Denise finds out Jane is back and Fergus starts to question whether Jane has been lying to him. Later, Ella finds out that Finn has quit his job and has turned to Denty for work. Finally, the nasty Adam Wyatt is back on the scene and plans to build property on the local park.
48	6	"Episode Six"	Ian Barnes	Maya Sondhi	4 October 2016	0.50
The entire town is talking about Lisa and Jenna's article, while Dan struggles to know what to do with Pauline, who is still numb and not saying a word. Elsewhere, Roger finds out the truth about Jane and Denise and Ollie have their first date. But things don't go quite as smoothly as they'd hoped.
49	7	"Episode Seven"	Ian Barnes	Mark Brotherhood	11 October 2016	0.49
Ella reveals she's pregnant. But how will Finn react? Elsewhere, the petition to save the park is in full swing and Lisa and Jenna attend a student rally. Also, Dan continues to worry about Pauline, while Denise and Ollie go on a second date. Has Denise finally found love?
50	8	"Episode Eight"	Roberto Bangura	Mark Brotherhood	18 October 2016	0.44
Pauline attends church with Barry and Nana but, before they leave, Lisa asks them to hand out a pile of 'save the park' leaflets. Barry opts to put them on car windscreens and inadvertently leaves one on the car of the very man they're protesting against: Adam Wyatt. Meanwhile, Nana is chatted up, Bradley pays Denty a visit and Lisa hosts a dinner party. But it is quickly interrupted by an unexpected guest...
51	9	"Episode Nine"	Roberto Bangura	Mark Brotherhood	25 October 2016	0.56
Just when Bradley thought he had seen the last of Denty and his lads, he gets a rude awakening. Meanwhile, the protest at Deans Park is in full swing and Roger convinces Pauline to let go of her past and look on the bright side of life.
52	10	"Episode Ten"	Roberto Bangura	Mark Brotherhood	1 November 2016	0.56
Tensions rise as bulldozers and a camera crew descend on the park while Adam Wyatt attempts to convince the gathering crowd that building property is a good idea. But Lisa is having none of it and voices her objections loud and clear. Meanwhile, Roger catches Carrie in a compromising situation and Barry is forced to intervene as Nana waits patiently for her date.

=== Finale (2017) ===
In March 2017, it was announced that Mount Pleasant would return for a special final episode later that year. The episode is 90 minutes long and is to revolve around Lisa and Dan's wedding anniversary, which will not be 'plain-sailing'.
