= Mount Pleasant (TV series) =

British television comedy drama

- Genre: Comedy drama
- Created by: Sarah Hooper
- Written by: Sarah Hooper; Mark Brotherhood; Amy Roberts; Loren McLaughlan
- Directed by: Dewi Humphreys (2011–2013); Dominic Leclerc (2011); Dermot Boyd (2012–2017); Ian Barnes (2012–2017)
- Starring: Sally Lindsay; Daniel Ryan; Ted Robbins; Bobby Ball; Angela Griffin; Neil Fitzmaurice; Paula Wilcox; Adrian Bower; Siân Reeves; Nigel Harman; Samantha Womack; James Dreyfus; Sue Vincent; Ellen Thomas; George Sampson
- Composer: Jonathan Whitehead
- Country of origin: United Kingdom
- Original language: English
- No. of series: 6
- No. of episodes: 53 (inc. 2 specials) (list of episodes)

Production
- Producers: Siobhan Rhodes (2011); Howard Ella (2012–13); Jane Wallbank (2013); Brett Wilson (2013); Serena Cullen (2014–17)
- Editors: Chris Wadsworth (2011–12); Clive Barrett (2011); Jim Hampton (2013–17)
- Running time: 60 minutes (inc. adverts); 90 minutes (inc. adverts) (2017 Special)
- Production company: Tiger Aspect Productions

Original release
- Network: Sky One (2011, 2015–2017); Sky Living (2012–2014)
- Release: 24 August 2011 – 30 June 2017

Mount Pleasant is a British comedy drama which first aired on Sky One on 24 August 2011. The show moved to Sky Living in 2012, before moving back to Sky 1 in 2015. The show ended in a 90 minute special on 30 June 2017.

== Premise ==
Set in Manchester, the show is about the day-to-day life of the main character Lisa, her husband, her dad, as well as neighbours and colleagues. Each episode is an hour long (including adverts) and takes place in various locations, including the cul-de-sac Lisa lives in, her workplace, local pub The Dog and Dart, and more.

== Cast ==
=== Key cast ===
Actor/Actress	Character	Duration
Sally Lindsay	Lisa Johnson	2011–2017
Daniel Ryan	Dan Johnson	2011–2017
Bobby Ball	Barry Harris	2011–2017
Pauline Collins	Sue Harris	2011–2012
Paula Wilcox	Pauline Johnson	2011–2017
Adrian Bower	Greg Porter	2011–2017
Angela Griffin	Shelley Porter	2011–2012
Neil Fitzmaurice	Ferguson Smythe	2011–2017
Ainsley Howard	Denise Bradwell	2011–2017
Sue Vincent	Margaret Harris	2011–2017
Ted Robbins	Terry Harris	2011–2017
Jill Halfpenny	Emma	2011
Siân Reeves	Bianca	2011–2014
Liza Tarbuck	Kate	2011–2012
Owen McDonnell	Jack	2011–2012
Diane Morgan	Talia	2011–2012
Cordelia Bugeja (series 1-2); Jo Joyner (series 6)	Jane	2011–2012, 2016–2017
Claire Goose	Kim	2012
Robson Green	Chris	2012
David Bradley	Charlie Johnson	2012–2014
George Sampson	Gary	2012–2014
James Dreyfus	Roger Jones	2012–2017
Sophia Di Martino	Amber	2013
Samantha Womack	Tanya Porter	2013–2017
Nigel Harman	Bradley Dawson	2013–2017
Nicola Millbank	Ella Dawson	2013–2017
Daniel Ings	Robbie Johnson	2014
Nicola Hughes	Jenna Miller	2015–2017
Patrick Robinson	Cameron Miller	2015–2017
Ellen Thomas	Nana Miller	2015–2017
Asan N'Jie	Finn Miller	2015–2017
Zita Sattar	Amita	2015
Clive Mantle	Trevor	2015
Jordan Dawes	Ollie Oliver	2016–2017
James Lance	Adam Wyatt	2016
Emily May Townsend	Emily	2016–2017

== Episodes ==
Series	Episodes	Originally released	
Series	Episodes	First released	Last released
1	8	24 August 2011	12 October 2011
2	9	22 August 2012	17 October 2012
Special		23 December 2012	
3	8	11 September 2013	30 October 2013
4	8	16 September 2014	4 November 2014
5	8	11 September 2015	30 October 2015
6	10	30 August 2016	1 November 2016
Special		30 June 2017	

== Production ==
The series is produced by Tiger Aspect Productions for Sky1. The series is filmed in Hale, Trafford, Chorlton, Manchester, and at The Sharp Project studio in Newton Heath, Manchester. The first series was filmed throughout June 2011.

== Home media ==
The complete first series of Mount Pleasant was released on DVD on 3 September 2012.

The complete second series of Mount Pleasant was released on DVD on 21 October 2013.
