= Tom Bidwell =

British screenwriter and playwright

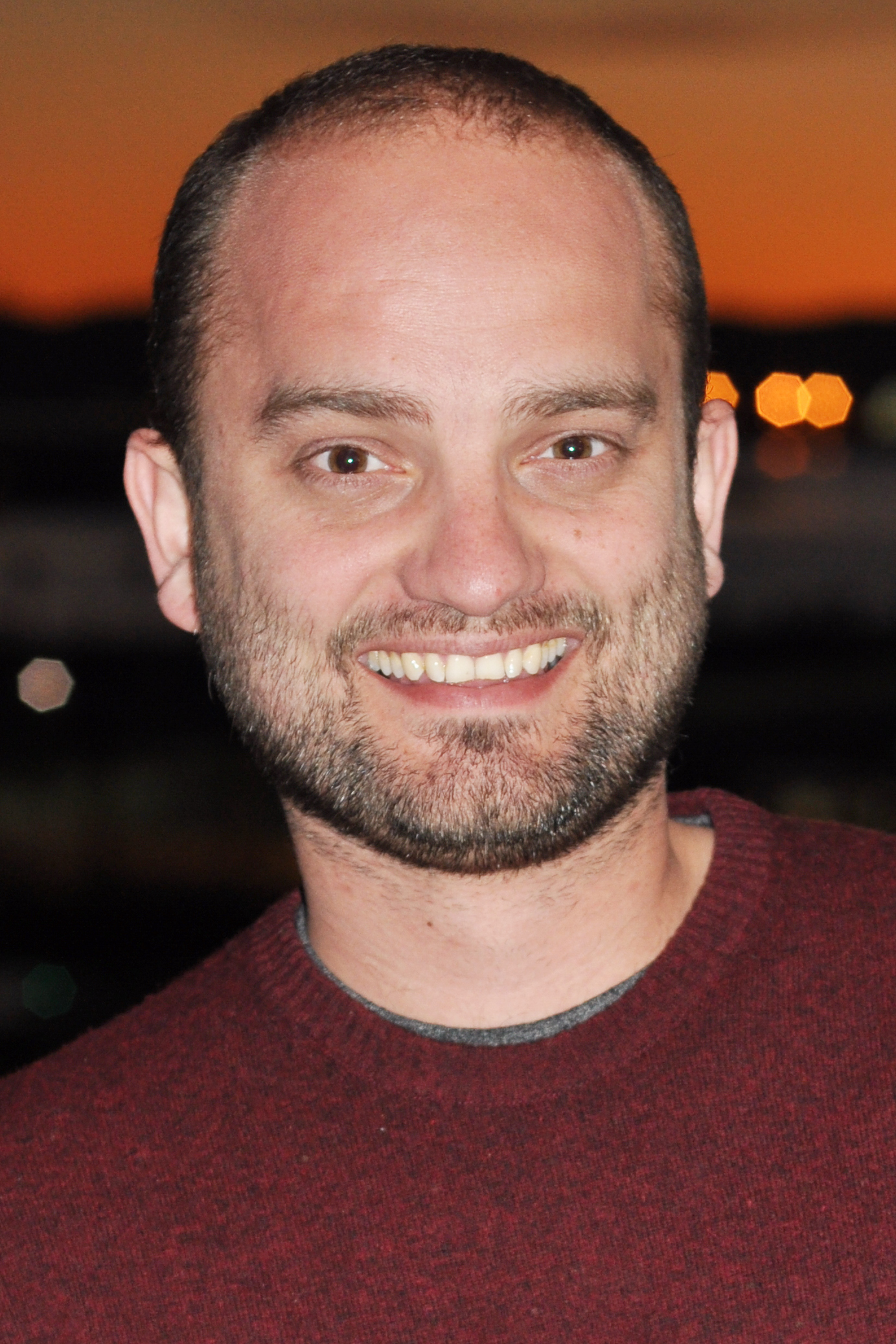
- Tom Bidwell in Spain, 2023
- Born: February 1984 (age 42)
- Occupations: Screenwriter, playwright
- Known for: My Mad Fat Diary; Watership Down; The Irregulars

Tom Dalton Bidwell (born February 1984) is a BAFTA and Emmy winning British screenwriter and playwright.

== Early life ==
Bidwell was born and raised in Leyland, Lancashire and attended Balshaw's Church of England High School. He was diagnosed with Non-Hodgkin lymphoma in 1999, at the age of 14, and wrote poetry while awaiting a bone marrow transplant. He developed cancer in his shoulder at the age of 15, which was successfully treated. He completed his GCSEs and later obtained a degree in English and Drama at university.

== Career ==
After writing plays, Bidwell got his break through a BBC Radio 4 play, later adapted into a 2009 short film, Wish 143. The story focuses on a terminally ill teenager who wishes to lose his virginity. It would go on to be nominated for an Academy Award in 2011 for Best Live Action Short Film. He was awarded a place on the BBC Writer's Academy, a programme designed to train new writers for their long running television series. He went on to write for all four of the BBC's popular continuing dramas: Doctors, EastEnders, Casualty and its spinoff, Holby City.

Bidwell went on to work on the E4 teen comedy-drama My Mad Fat Diary. The series was nominated for multiple BAFTA awards. Bidwell was approached by MTV to work on an American remake of the series, which was not made. In July 2014, it was announced that BBC would be airing a new animated serial of Watership Down, helmed by Bidwell. The series was a co-production between BBC and Netflix, with a budget of £20 million. The drama won a Daytime Emmy Award for Outstanding Special Class Animated Program.

On 20 December 2018, it was announced that Netflix was planning a new adventure series with Bidwell, The Irregulars, based on the Baker Street Irregulars from the Sherlock Holmes novels. Bidwell described the program as "my dream project and my oldest idea" and it takes a different view of Holmes and his relationship to the Irregulars, which has the band of street kids solve cases. The eight-episode The Irregulars premiered on 26 March 2021.

He has worked on two adaptations of Jaqueline Wilson novels- Katy and The Primrose Railway Children. For the former he won the BAFTA for best writer at the Children's BAFTAs in 2018.

Bidwell scripted an animated adaptation of The Velveteen Rabbit, which would stream on 22 November 2023 on Apple TV+. It features Phoenix Laroche and the voices of Alex Lawther, Helena Bonham Carter, Nicola Coughlan. The show went on to win two Emmys at the Children and Family Emmy Awards held in Los Angeles in 2025 and the BAFTA for Children's Craft Team.

== Personal life ==
Bidwell still lives in Towngate area of Leyland with his American wife Lorraine Metz. In 2018 he volunteered to help pupils at Frenchwood Community Primary School in Preston with their story-making skills, in a visit organised through teacher Jane Bidwell, his sister-in-law.
