= Fadmoor =

Village and civil parish in North Yorkshire, England

Coordinates: 54.29422°N 0.96256°W

- Location within North Yorkshire
- Population: 184 (2011)
- OS grid reference: SE676892
- Civil parish: Fadmoor
- Unitary authority: North Yorkshire
- Ceremonial county: North Yorkshire
- Region: Yorkshire and the Humber
- Country: England
- Sovereign state: United Kingdom
- Post town: YORK
- Postcode district: YO62
- Police: North Yorkshire
- Fire: North Yorkshire
- Ambulance: Yorkshire
- UK Parliament: Thirsk and Malton

Fadmoor is a village and civil parish in North Yorkshire, England. It is on the border of the North York Moors and 2 miles (3.2 km) north of Kirkbymoorside.

The name Fadmoor comes from Old English and means moor of a man called Fadda.

From 1974 to 2023 it was part of the district of Ryedale. It is now administered by the unitary North Yorkshire Council.

The 18th century village pub, The Plough, closed in 2011 and became a community asset in 2013. The work to re-open the pub was the subject of a Channel 4 documentary.

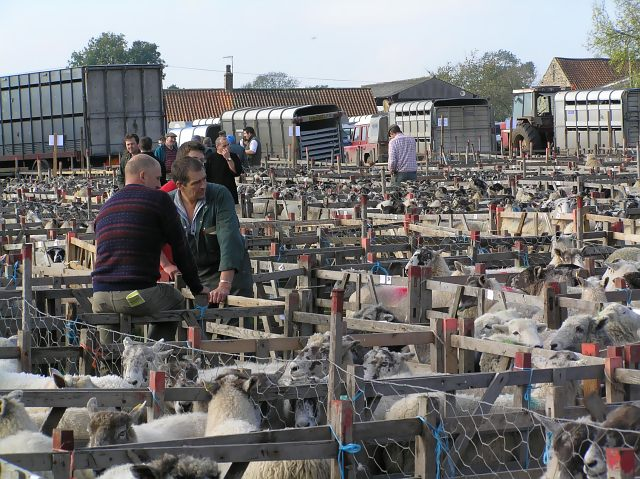
Sheep sale at Fadmoor, autumn 2005
