= My Mad Fat Diary =

British television series

- Genre: Period teen drama; Comedy drama
- Based on: My Fat, Mad Teenage Diary by Rae Earl
- Written by: Tom Bidwell; Laura Neal; George Kay
- Directed by: Tim Kirkby; Benjamin Caron; Anthony Philipson; Luke Snellin; Vanessa Caswill; Alex Winckler
- Starring: Sharon Rooney; Claire Rushbrook; Ian Hart; Dan Cohen; Jodie Comer; Nico Mirallegro
- Narrated by: Sharon Rooney
- Opening theme: "One to Another" by The Charlatans
- Country of origin: United Kingdom
- Original language: English
- No. of series: 3
- No. of episodes: 16 (list of episodes)

Production
- Executive producers: Roanna Benn; Jude Liknaitzky; Will Gould; Greg Brenman
- Producers: Marianne Buckland; Matthew Bouch; Jules Hussey
- Production locations: Stamford, Lincolnshire, England
- Cinematography: David Marsh; Giulio Biccari; Suzie Lavelle
- Editors: Tom Hemmings; Adam Bosman
- Running time: 45 minutes
- Production company: Tiger Aspect Productions: Drama Republic

Original release
- Network: E4
- Release: 14 January 2013 – 6 July 2015

My Mad Fat Diary is a British period teen comedy-drama television series that debuted on E4 on 14 January 2013. It is based on the novel My Fat, Mad Teenage Diary by Rae Earl.

The second series started on 19 February 2014 and ended on 31 March 2014, with each episode posted on 4oD a week prior to the television release. In November 2014, it was announced that a final three-episode third series would be made, set in 1998.

After three series and sixteen episodes, My Mad Fat Diary broadcast its final episode on 6 July 2015.

The series was nominated for multiple BAFTA awards, with Sharon Rooney winning in 2015 for Best Drama Actress.

== Plot ==
Set in Stamford, Lincolnshire in the mid-1990s, My Mad Fat Diary follows the story of 16-year-old, 16 stone (106 kg; 233 lb) girl, Rae Earl, who has just left a psychiatric hospital, where she has spent four months. She begins to reconnect with her best friend, Chloe, who is unaware of Rae's mental health and body image problems, believing she has been in France for the past four months. Rae attempts to keep this information from her while also trying to impress Chloe's friends Finn, Archie, Izzy and Chop.

== Cast and characters ==
=== Main cast ===
- Sharon Rooney as Rachel "Rae" Earl, a 16-year-old who has spent four months in a psychiatric hospital. She struggles to hide her mental health and body image problems from her new friends and finds it hard to fit in.
- Claire Rushbrook as Linda Earl-Bouchtat, Rae's mum.
- Ian Hart as Kester Gill, Rae's therapist who helps her deal with her issues.
- Dan Cohen as Archie, Rae's close friend, whom she briefly dates before he comes out as gay.
- Jodie Comer as Chloe Gemell, Rae's attractive, popular best friend from childhood.
- Nico Mirallegro as Finley "Finn" Nelson, a boy whom Rae clashes with at first, but who later becomes her main love interest.
- Jordan Murphy as Arnold "Chop" Peters, the party animal of their group of friends. He begins a relationship with Izzy at the end of series one. Initially uncomfortable with Archie's homosexuality, the two reconcile when Chop stands up for Archie when the latter gets picked on at the pub.
- Ciara Baxendale as Izzy, the sweet but ditzy girl of the group. Often cheerful and optimistic, Rae describes her as never having a negative thought. She eventually begins a relationship with Chop.
- Keith Allen as Victor Earl (series 2–3), Rae's father.

=== Recurring cast ===
- Sophie Wright as Tix (series 1, 3), a resident of the psychiatric hospital and Rae's other best friend. In the series 2 opener, it is revealed that she had died due to over-exercising and refusing to eat at the end of the previous series. She makes a cameo appearance in the final episode of series 3 as Rae reflects on her teenage years and when Rae sees everyone in the reflection of the train window.
- Darren Evans as Danny Two Hats, a resident of the psychiatric hospital and later, due to the death of Tix at the end of series one, Rae's friend.
- Bamshad Abedi-Amin as Karim Bouchtat, the Tunisian undocumented immigrant boyfriend, and later husband, of Rae's mum.
- Shazad Latif as Nick Kassar (series 1), a doctor at the psychiatric hospital.
- Eliot Otis Brown Walters as Big G (series 1–2), a bully who often picks on Rae, calling her Jabba.
- Cameron Moore as Stephen Carrisford (series 1–2), a PE Teacher in Rae's school.
- Sacha Parkinson as Stacey Stringfellow (series 2), a popular girl who used to date Finn and bullies other girls.
- Susie Potter as Amy Malone (series 2), a tough girl in Stacey's clique. She falls out with Stacey after she says she looked 'proper rough'. She later ends up dating Liam and even threatens Rae whenever she sees her with Liam.
- Jodie Hamblet as Vicky (series 2), a popular girl in Stacey's clique. She has a skin condition, although she dislikes talking about it. She later becomes an enemy of Rae and Chloe, regularly insulting them at school.
- Kirsty Armstrong as Lois (series 2–3), a sweet girl in Stacey's clique. She is revealed to be Archie's "girlfriend". After Rae "outs" Archie to Lois, she threatens to tell her friends that Archie is gay if he doesn't tell everyone first.
- Turlough Convery as Liam Owen (series 2–3), Rae's new friend/love interest who attends group therapy with her in Series 2. He makes a cameo appearance in the final episode of series 3 when Rae sees everyone in the reflection of the train window.
- Sophie Stanton as Principal Dixon (series 2–3), Rae’s firm but fair headteacher at college who gives her several ‘second chances’ and encourages her to go to Bristol University.
- Tony Pitts as Chloe’s dad (series 2–3).
- Debra Stephenson as Chloe’s mum (series 2–3).
- Faye Marsay as Katie Springer (series 3), a former student at Rae's school who comes back to Stamford to speak about her experiences at university.
- Karl Davies as Rob (series 3), Rae's boss in a record shop and Archie's lover.
- Lolita Chakrabarti as Dr Juliet Allen (series 3), Kester’s replacement.

== Episodes ==
Series	Episodes	Originally released	
Series	Episodes	First released	Last released
1	6	14 January 2013	18 February 2013
2	7	17 February 2014	31 March 2014
3	3	22 June 2015	6 July 2015

== Critical reception ==
Throughout its run, My Mad Fat Diary received critical acclaim, particularly for its accurate and honest portrayal of mental illness and Sharon Rooney's performance. The Guardian's Sam Wollaston called it a "lovely drama – honest and painful, real, and very funny," going on to say "Sharon Rooney's performance in the lead is natural, effortless and utterly believable; she should win something for it." The Stage called it "a comedy drama that actually satisfies the criteria of both genres, My Mad Fat Diary offers a unique and uncompromising perspective on adolescent angst that distresses and delights by turns. Visual gimmicks – flashbacks, fantasies and animated squiggles leaping from the page – are used sparingly but effectively, allowing the focus to stay fixed on Rae and Rooney’s commanding and engagingly natural central performance." The Art Desk said "the first episode of this six-part comedy drama is touching, hilarious and perfectly cast." Claire Webb of the Radio Times said the plot is "as uplifting as it is moving, although the banter and gimmicks won't be to everybody's taste."

The show also received praise for its honest portrayal of mental health. Brian Semple of The Independent calls the show "surprisingly honest, funny and even moving account of what it’s like for a teenage girl to live with serious mental health problems, free of many of the clichés that often inform how mental illness is portrayed on TV," going on to say that Rae "has a mental illness, but it doesn't define her. It's just something that she has to deal with and try to manage on a daily basis, just like the one in ten young people in the UK who have a mental illness." Semple refers to My Mad Fat Diary as a "breath of fresh air and will do a lot to change the way young people think about mental health." The mental health charity Mind honoured the show in their annual Media Awards in the Drama category in 2014 and 2016.

In a more mixed review, Robert Epstein of The Independent criticised E4 for relating the program to its other teen shows: "If such comparisons are unfair, blame it on E4, whose continuity announcer declared: 'If you like Skins, The Inbetweeners and Misfits, you'll like this.' Well, sorry, I do like those three shows, but, even with a great soundtrack (if only the Mack really would return …) and the odd nice line, My Mad Fat Diary is a long way from the equal of that trio in invention, edge or humour."

My Mad Fat Diary star Sharon Rooney was chosen as one of the first group of BAFTA "Breakthrough Brits" in 2013.

== Ratings ==
The first episode of the third and final series attracted 548,000 viewers on E4, whilst the second episode attracted 537,000 viewers. The final episode of the series attracted 450,000 viewers. All viewing figures exclude those who watched on All 4 and on E4+1.

== American remake ==
Tom Bidwell, the writer of the show, mentioned in April 2014 in an interview with the Chorley Guardian that MTV has commissioned him to work on an American remake of the show.

== Awards and nominations ==
Year	Award	Category	Recipient	Result
2013	British Academy Scotland Awards	Best Actor/Actress - Television	Sharon Rooney	Nominated
2014	British Academy Television Awards	Best Drama Series	My Mad Fat Diary	Nominated
2014	British Academy Television Awards	Best Supporting Actress	Claire Rushbrook	Nominated
2014	British Academy Scotland Awards	Best Actress - Television	Sharon Rooney	Nominated
2014	Broadcasting Press Guild Awards	Breakthrough Award	Sharon Rooney	Nominated
2014	Mind Media Awards	Drama	My Mad Fat Diary	Won
2014	Royal Television Society Awards	Best Drama Series	My Mad Fat Diary	Nominated
2014	Royal Television Society Awards	Best Actress	Sharon Rooney	Nominated
2015	British Academy Scotland Awards	Best Actress - Television	Sharon Rooney	Won
2015	International Emmy Awards	Drama Series	My Mad Fat Diary	Nominated
2016	Mind Media Awards	Drama	My Mad Fat Diary	Won
