= List of Hank Zipzer episodes =

Hank Zipzer is a children's television series which stars Nick James in the titular role as a 12-year-old dyslexic schoolboy. The show is based on the series of books by Henry Winkler, who plays the character of Mr. Rock, Hank's music teacher. The first season premiered in January 2014 on CBBC. Unlike the books that took place in America, the series takes place in Britain. The second season began airing on 13 August 2015. Javone Prince made his first appearance as Mr. Joy in series 2, episode 5, "Hank's Hero." The third season began airing on 26 May 2016, which was followed by an 84-minute Christmas television film, Hank Zipzer's Christmas Catastrophe, in December 2016. All three seasons of the Hank Zipzer series stream globally on HBO Max, and in the U.K. on BBC iPlayer. HBO Max began streaming Hank Zipzer's Christmas Catastrophe on December 2, 2022.

== Series overview ==
Series	Episodes	Originally released	
Series	Episodes	First released	Last released
1	13	28 January 2014	22 April 2014
2	13	13 August 2015	5 November 2015
3	13	26 May 2016	18 August 2016
Hank Zipzer's Christmas Catastrophe		12 December 2016	

== Episodes ==
=== Season 1 (2014) ===
Season 1 was produced by Siobhan Bachman and Ali Bryer Carron.

- Nick James, Jayden Jean-Paul Denis, Chloe Wong, Felicity Montagu, Juliet Cowan, and Madeline Holliday appear in all episodes.
- Nick Mohammed is absent for four episodes.
- Jude Foley is absent for two episodes.
- Neil Fitzmaurice is absent for one episode.
- Vincenzo Nicoli and Henry Winkler are absent for three episodes each.

No. overall	No. in season	Title	Directed by	Written by	Original release date	UK viewers (millions)
1	1	"Classroom Catastrophe"	Matt Bloom	Joe Williams	28 January 2014	363,000
Ms. Adolf gives the pupils an assignment to write an essay about their summer holidays. Keen to avoid doing any writing, Hank decides to build a model of his holiday at Niagara Falls and demonstrate the experience to the class instead.
2	2	"The Lucky Socks"	Matt Bloom	Joe Williams	4 February 2014	N/A
The school announces its annual House sport and quiz competition and Hank finds himself forced to try out for the Yellow House.
3	3	"The Curtain Went Up, My Trousers Went Down"	Matt Bloom	Joe Williams	11 February 2014	N/A
Getting the lead role in the school play should be a cause for celebration for Hank. But with school bully McKelty determined to get the role for himself and Hank struggling to learn his lines, it's not as easy as he thought it was going to be.
4	4	"Battle of the Goblins"	Matt Bloom	Daniel Peak	18 February 2014	N/A
Hank accidentally breaks his and Frankie's latest science project and Frankie has to pick up the pieces rather than collect the latest voice-activated games console as soon as it hits the store. Absent: Nick Mohammed as Mr. Love, Henry Winkler as Mr. Rock
5	5	"Haunted Hank"	Matt Bloom	Dan Berlinka	25 February 2014	N/A
Nick McKelty oversteps the mark when he picks on Hank's little sister Emily. To get revenge, Hank decides to make the world's scariest haunted house. Absent: Nick Mohammed as Mr. Love
6	6	"The War of Words"	Rebecca Rycroft	Bede Blake	4 March 2014	N/A
Stan and Emily struggle to cope with Hank and Rosa's more unorthodox approaches to study, and Hank starts to feel the pressure when Stan bets his coveted Topps Football Card against his mortal rival Mick McKelty - bully Nick McKelty's dad. Stan pushes Hank so far that he quits the team, but when his dad eats humble pie and Hank sees how important winning the bet is to him, Hank tries his best to meet his dad halfway. Absent: Henry Winkler as Mr. Rock
7	7	"The Day I Flunked Chemistry"	Matt Bloom	Madeleine Brettingham	11 March 2014	N/A
Hank thinks new boy Ben is totally cool, and is amazed to discover that the feeling is mutual. But will Ben feel the same if he finds out about Hank's learning difficulties? Hank isn't willing to take the risk and so decides not to tell him. That plan has disastrous consequences when Hank misreads an experiment, leading to the gassing of Ms. Adolf and the evacuation of the science block. Ashley has a crush on Ben and Frankie is jealous of Hank's new friend.
8	8	"The Mortadella Disaster"	Rebecca Rycroft	Joe Williams	18 March 2014	290,000
Hank gets his new report and gets bad marks. Meanwhile, a man called Bob Bing likes Rosa's new recipe. To hide his report, Hank sticks it in Rosa's meat grinder in the Spicy Salami which ends up in Rosa's mortadella. Absent: Jude Foley as McKelty, Henry Winkler as Mr. Rock
9	9	"Who Ordered the Baby?"	Rebecca Rycroft	Bede Blake	25 March 2014	285,000
Hank is pleased when his mum says he can work in the deli to earn a new pair of the latest cool trainers. That is until he's given his latest school assignment, to look after a pretend baby for the weekend. Despite his best attempts, Hank can't juggle a crying baby and work. He decides to focus on getting the trainers, but disaster strikes when he accidentally ends up swapping his fake baby for a real one. Absent: Neil Fitzmaurice as Stan, Vincenzo Nicoli as Papa Pete
10	10	"I Think I Broke My Dad"	Rebecca Rycroft	Mark Oswin	1 April 2014	207,000
Stan is dismayed to find that Hank is avoiding him because of his new dyslexia therapies, so he becomes a "Cool Dad". When he thinks he has the right to be in the band For the talent show, Hank has to stop his dad performing in the band at the talent show! Absent: Nick Mohammed as Mr. Love, Vincenzo Nicoli as Papa Pete
11	11	"The Week I Became a Genius"	Rebecca Rycroft	Ali Bryer Carron	8 April 2014	N/A
Hank's school has an American-themed week, and Hank is made to do a presentation about Einstein, and feels upset when he finds out that Frankie and Ashley have teamed up with McKelty. He also makes friends with Year 6 boy, Mason Williams, who is at Westbrook Academy for Transition Week. Having met him, Hank and Mason bond and before long are good friends. Mason helps Hank with his Albert Einstein presentation when one of his cards gets stuck to his hand. Hank, Frankie, and Ashley make up in the end.
12	12	"Anyone for Lizard"	Rebecca Rycroft	Lucy Guy	15 April 2014	N/A
Hank can't believe his luck when he is chosen to host the Japan exchange student. He even manages to remember to get his permission slip signed... only for McKelty to steal it. With no signed permission slip, Hank is in danger of not being allowed to take part. To show how committed Hank is to the exchange programme, Rosa organises a Japanese banquet for Ms. Adolf and Mr. Rock. The banquet ends in disaster: an escaped lizard, marauding crickets and a fainting Stan, who covers Ms. Adolf with sushi. All looks lost, until Rosa uncovers Ms. Adolf's secret passion: karaoke. Absent: Vincenzo Nicoli as Papa Pete
13	13	"My First Date Dilemma"	Rebecca Rycroft	Joe Williams	22 April 2014	N/A
Hank meets a cool girl, Zoe, in Mr. Rock's additional reading class and falls head over heels in love. Ashley and Frankie try to subtly find out whether Zoe has a boyfriend but Hank is horrified when he learns that their approach has given the game away to Zoe. Emotions going haywire, Hank can't eat, sleep, and gets into trouble at school. Papa Pete advises Hank to embrace his emotions and Hank decides to take Zoe on a date, but it ends in disaster. Absent: Nick Mohammed as Mr. Love, Jude Foley as McKelty

=== Season 2 (2015) ===
Season 2 was produced by Jim Poyser.

- Nick James, Juliet Cowan, Neil Fitzmaurice, and Madeline Holliday appear in all episodes.
- Jayden Jean Paul-Denis, Alicia Lai, and Felicity Montagu are all absent for one episode.
- Nick Mohammed is absent for two episodes before leaving the cast in the episode "Head Ache".
- Javone Prince is absent for two episodes after joining the cast in the episode "Hank's Hero".
- Jude Foley is absent for seven episodes.
- Vincenzo Nicoli is absent for four episodes.
- Henry Winkler is absent for three episodes.

No. overall	No. in season	Title	Directed by	Written by	Original release date	UK viewers (millions)
14	1	"Camera Calamity"	Tom George	Joe Williams	13 August 2015	209,000
Every year Hank's school photo matches his school report perfectly - they're both terrible. But this year Hank's making sure his photo is picture perfect - until McKelty ruins it with a fountain of fizzy drink. Can Hank get clean and tidy and back in front of the camera before the photographer leaves? And will Emily get her place at the Institute of Scientific Excellence without her parents messing it up for her? Absent: Henry Winkler as Mr. Rock
15	2	"No Room for Two"	Matt Bloom	Lucy Guy	20 August 2015	224,000
It's Friday afternoon and tomorrow Hank will be in charge of the coolest stall at the school fair - this weekend is going to be amazing! Except Emily's room is being redecorated and she'll be sleeping in with Hank until it's done. Oh, and she's bringing Katherine with her. Maybe this weekend won't be so amazing after all. Absent: Jayden Jean Paul-Denis as Frankie, Alicia Lai as Ashley, Nick Mohammed as Mr. Love, Jude Foley as McKelty
16	3	"Cow Poo Treasure Hunt"	Matt Bloom	Mark Oswin	27 August 2015	N/A
When he's not allowed to hang out at the shopping centre with Frankie and Ashley, Hank decides to show Stan and Rosa just how capable he is by being the first person to make it through Miss Adolf's weekend survival camp. Meanwhile, Papa Pete tries to make it through a single day of Emily helping out at the deli. Absent: Nick Mohammed as Mr. Love, Henry Winkler as Mr. Rock
17	4	"Head Ache"	Tom George	Lucy Guy	3 September 2015	N/A
Mr. Love is leaving and Hank is thrown into panic mode when Ms. Adolf decides to use him as her pet project to show the governors that she is the best candidate to be the new head teacher. Meanwhile, Emily announces she is going to home-school herself, much to the horror of Stan and Rosa who decide that they will have to try to become her new teachers - if she'll let them! Last appearance as a main character: Nick Mohammed as Mr. Love Absent: Jude Foley as McKelty, Vincenzo Nicoli as Papa Pete
18	5	"Hank's Hero"	Tom George	Joe Williams	10 September 2015	N/A
Hank and Stan are whipped into a frenzy when they hear that new headmaster, Mr. Joy - keen to make a splash - is bringing their favourite footballer, Alex Broman to Westbrook Academy for an official visit. A few lucky pupils will be chosen for a kickabout with their hero, but when Hank finds himself in another Adolf detention it looks like he's going to miss out - or is he? First appearance: Javone Prince as Mr. Joy Absent: Jude Foley as McKelty, Vincenzo Nicoli as Papa Pete
19	6	"Open Day"	Matt Bloom	Joe Williams	17 September 2015	N/A
It's Open Day at Westbrook Academy and Hank has big plans to show potential newcomers that not everyone is as boring as McKelty or as mean as Miss Adolf. Mr. Joy though, has other ideas... Keen to keep all troublemakers away from his grand assembly to the prospective parents, he excludes Hank and just to be sure, banishes Emily to Mr. Rock's music room. Is it really going to be a Zipzer-free Open Day? Absent: Vincenzo Nicoli as Papa Pete
20	7	"Ballot Box Hunter"	Matt Bloom	Jon Macqueen	24 September 2015	N/A
When a seat on Westbrook's school council becomes available, Hank uses charm, personality and Rosa's pastries to try to stop it from going to McKelty. However Emily is trying to win the election another way - by convincing everybody that she's too cool for school. Absent: Vincenzo Nicoli as Papa Pete
21	8	"Valentine's Confusion"	Matt Bloom	Holly Phillips	1 October 2015	N/A
Hank has his heart set on asking Anya to the Valentine's dance, but soon discovers that this year Valentine's Day is doing funny things to people and Hank ends up in a pickle when he tries to please more than one girl. Meanwhile, Rosa and Stan are proving that even as grown-ups, Valentine's Day can be a confusing time. Absent: Jude Foley as McKelty
22	9	"Camouflage"	Matt Bloom	Adam G. Goodwin & Jonathan Parkyn	8 October 2015	N/A
With Emily in hospital having her tonsils out and a history project due, Hank decides that the best possible course of action is to take Katherine - Emily's lizard and best friend - into school. Meanwhile at the hospital, Stan is trying to prove to Rosa that he's not squeamish - easier said than done when all you want to do is pass out. Absent: Javone Prince as Mr. Joy, Jude Foley as McKelty, Henry Winkler as Mr. Rock
23	10	"Hank's Birthday"	Tom George	Madeline Brettingham	15 October 2015	N/A
It's Hank's thirteenth birthday and he wants the greatest party of all time. Unfortunately Stan and Rosa have other ideas, so Hank decides to have a secret party of his own in the den. Absent: Javone Prince as Mr. Joy
24	11	"Hank's New School"	Tom George	Mark Evans	22 October 2015	N/A
After yet another bad parents' evening, Stan is determined to get Hank a good education - at another school. Desperate not to leave Frankie, Ashley and Mr. Rock behind, Hank is forced to do the unthinkable and fight to stay at Westbrook Academy. Mr. Rock, on the other hand, finds an old friend's offer for a life away from Westbrook extremely tempting. Absent: Jude Foley as McKelty
25	12	"Papa Pete in Love"	Tom George	Danny Peak	29 October 2015	N/A
When Hank gets a good grade at school thanks to his grandad's support, Hank decides to find him a new girlfriend. What could go wrong? Back at home, Emily has a new boyfriend and a suspicious Stan grills him about his intentions... until that is, he realises his mistake. Absent: Felicity Montagu as Miss Adolf, Jude Foley as McKelty
26	13	"Last Day"	Tom George	Jon Macqueen	5 November 2015	N/A
It is the last day of the summer term and Hank is determined to make it through without a detention. An incident with an egg in assembly changes all of that and Hank finds himself in danger of being excluded from school permanently. Note: This episode features clips from previous episodes in season 2.

=== Season 3 (2016) ===
Season 3 was produced by Richard Grocock.

- Jude Foley and Neil Fitzmaurice are both absent for one episode each.
- Javone Prince and Henry Winkler are both absent for two episodes each.
- Vincenzo Nicoli is absent for three episodes.

No. overall	No. in season	Title	Directed by	Written by	Original release date	UK viewers (millions)
27	1	"Teacher Torture"	Matt Bloom	Lucy Guy	26 May 2016	0.0
Hank is looking forward to having a new form teacher at school, rather than Miss Adolf. However, he discovers that his new teacher, Miss Goodison wants the class to talk about their feelings and problems in class. Even worse, she wants Hank to discuss his dyslexia and the rest of the class to write poetry about him. It's too much for Hank and he sets out, with Frankie and Ashley's help, to get Adolf back again. Meanwhile Rosa is trying and failing to come to terms with some new hi-tech gadgetry in the deli... Note: This was the only episode to premiere on BBC iPlayer before airing on TV. Absent: Neil Fitzmaurice as Stan, Henry Winkler as Mr. Rock
28	2	"Vlog It!"	Nick Collett	Joe Williams	2 June 2016	N/A
The pupils of Westbrook try to produce the best vlogs and videos. When Hank is humiliated by Nick McKelty, he vows to outdo him with his next vlog. But is Hank really willing to sacrifice what little dignity he has in order to succeed? Meanwhile Stan and old enemy Mick McKelty (Nick's dad) find themselves facing off against each other when both sign up for Mr. Rock's after-school choir.
29	3	"Zipzers and Aliens"	Matt Bloom	Matt Bloom	9 June 2016	N/A
Hank accidentally gets his friends' copies of worldwide publishing sensation The Alien Adventures confiscated by Miss Adolf and has to put things right before the author herself makes a very special visit to Westbrook. Absent: Vincenzo Nicoli as Papa Pete
30	4	"Educating Zipzer"	Matt Bloom	Danny Peak	16 June 2016	N/A
A film crew is coming to the school to make a documentary. Everyone comes into school very excited, particularly Mr. Joy who intends to be onscreen as much as possible. By a series of accidents, Hank becomes the central figure in the documentary, causing himself stress and putting a strain on his relationship with Frankie and Ashley (who were meant to be sharing the limelight with him). Mr. Rock tries to escape the unwelcome attention of the film crew, while Rosa tries to use the opportunity to advertise the deli. Ultimately it's up to Hank to try and sort everything out, win his friends back and get back to normal. Absent: Vincenzo Nicoli as Papa Pete
31	5	"Hank's Good Turn"	Matt Bloom	Mark Oswin	23 June 2016	N/A
There is a school inspector coming round and the school is to be on its best behaviour. Meanwhile, Hank is trying to do a good turn to McKelty but ends up injuring him more. Hank gradually makes friends with him and they bond over McKelty's funny (but slightly rude) caricatures of members of staff. However Hank accidentally hands them in to Adolf and a chase ensues as Hank and McKelty try and get them back. They finally get them back, only for Hank to accidentally push McKelty and his wheelchair down some stairs, injuring him and the School Inspector in the process. Meanwhile Rosa is fed up at the mess in the house and decides to leave all the dishes, hoping someone will get the message.
32	6	"My Girlfriend Has Flippers"	Matt Bloom	Holly Phillips	30 June 2016	N/A
Mr. Rock is put in charge of doing an assembly on marine life, much to the annoyance of Adolf, who wanted to do it in the first place. As Rock pairs Hank up with Anya, Anya reveals that they are no longer an item. Hank didn't even know they were together! Hank then sets out to win back Anya, but Frankie's advice to be cool and distant to Anya backfires terribly and she becomes more interested in McKelty. When it comes to the final assembly, Hank saves Anya from a huge collapsing prop and all is forgiven, but Anya still has some bad news for Hank. Meanwhile Emily unaccountably finds herself in love with a boy with a floppy fringe and sparkly eyes and she tries to find a scientific explanation for it.
33	7	"Undercover Hank"	Matt Bloom	Joe Williams	7 July 2016	N/A
Mr. Joy announces to the school that he is to receive a special award in recognition of his work, but at that moment, Mr. Love appears, fresh back from his book tour, claiming the prize is actually for him. A tussle ensues. Meanwhile, Hank is wrongly identified as having sprayed graffiti on a wall and is sent home by Joy. He decides his only option is to sneak back into school, disguised as a girl, and to try and find the culprit and clear his name. He has to dodge the unwanted attentions of McKelty, and with Frankie and Ashley's help he manages to unmask the culprit. Guest star: Nick Mohammed as Mr. Love Absent: Vincenzo Nicoli as Papa Pete
34	8	"School Sleepover"	Matt Bloom	Adam G. Goodwin & Jonathan Parkyn	14 July 2016	N/A
Mr. Rock is holding a sponsored school sleepover and it's the best thing ever... or at least it would be if Hank didn't also have to find time to make up for years of lousy Mother's Days by making his mum the perfect present. Can Hank and friends use the sleepover as cover for an emergency session of craft and design? Can Emily get away with bringing her beloved lizard Katherine to school? And will Stan's plans to make Rosa the ideal Mother's Day meal turn out quite as well as he hopes?
35	9	"Operation: Prank Adolf"	Matt Bloom	Jon Macqueen	21 July 2016	N/A
April Fool's Day is looming and Hank is pulling out all the stops to prank the unprankable Miss Adolf. Can Hank really come up with a way to outwit Westbrook's toughest teacher? Can he succeed without ruining Mr. Rock's chances of winning the new top teacher award? Meanwhile, Rosa plans to teach Emily the joy of April Fool's pranks - whether Emily wants to learn them or not..
36	10	"Captain Hank and the Last Picks"	Nick Collett	Jon Macqueen	28 July 2016	N/A
Hank has been drinking cans of Goodness Fizz in order to win games equipment for the school. Miss Luffkin, brand manager for Goodness Fizz, offers Joy more sports equipment in exchange for a branding campaign in the school. Joy, who is falling for her charms, accepts, but the gym is now rebranded as an elite sports centre, and Hank and the other sporting no-hopers are not allowed in. Meanwhile, Emily is campaigning hard to get Goodness Fizz banned, and she discovers that it's 95 per cent sugar. Ultimately, Hank and his Last Picks challenge McKelty to a game of basketball in an attempt to gain access to the elite centre - a showdown which is then interrupted by a campaigning Emily. Absent: Henry Winkler as Mr. Rock
37	11	"Christmas in July"	Nick Collett	Lucy Guy	4 August 2016	N/A
Only Hank Zipzer would think of holding Christmas in the middle of summer and only Hank's family would agree to let him do it. Soon Hank's imagination runs out of control and he's inviting Mr. Rock to join the yuletide fun and planning to get a cow to dress up as a reindeer. Will Emily's perfect planning save Hank from another disaster? And can Mr. Rock's unexpected guest, Miss Adolf, really save the day? Absent: Javone Prince as Mr. Joy, Jude Foley as McKelty
38	12	"Hank Rocks Out!"	Nick Collett	Mark Oswin	11 August 2016	N/A
It's that time of year again - once more Miss Adolf is trying to get victims to sign up for her annual survival camp. With a rock festival being held just a few miles from Miss Adolf's camp, Hank and friends mean to sneak off to see their favourite band. Unfortunately they reckoned without Miss Adolf's favourite snitch, Nick McKelty. Meanwhile, Stan tries to impress Rosa with his spontaneity by sneaking her off to the festival too, while Emily is left at home to teach Papa Pete and his game-loving pals the perils of playing against a super-smart girl. Absent: Javone Prince as Mr. Joy
39	13	"The Crunchy Pickle"	Nick Collett	Joe Williams	18 August 2016	N/A
Rosa has the option to move the whole family to New York and open a new branch of the deli, but she doesn't want to move Hank if he's settled and doing well at school. Hank overhears this and - desperate to move to America - sets out to do badly at school by getting in trouble. When he realizes that he'll miss his friends he tries to reverse his decision, but now he's in trouble with Miss Adolf and he has to try and get into her good books before a meeting with Stan and Rosa. He fails and we cut to the deli, where a tearful Papa Pete has organised a leaving do. However, it becomes clear that all members of the family are actually having second thoughts about leaving friends and family behind. Note: This episode featured clips from other episodes in season 3

=== Hank Zipzer's Christmas Catastrophe (2016) ===
Title	Directed by	Written by	Original release date	UK viewers (millions)
"Hank Zipzer's Christmas Catastrophe"	Matt Bloom	Joe Williams & Debbie Isitt	12 December 2016	288,000
Hank is in the run up to Christmas as he prepares for a new baby brother. But Hank’s life never runs smoothly and soon Miss Adolf is turning Mr. Rock’s Rudolph the Rock 'N' Roll Reindeer into a one-woman Christmas Carol – two school inspectors are getting injured in a bizarre sleighing accident and Mr. Joy is trying to cancel Christmas altogether. In his attempt to drag triumph from the glittering jaws of doom, Hank will ice skate into disaster, nearly crash a Christmas tree into a crowd, get himself and his best friends arrested, get his favourite teacher sacked and lose the love of his life. This time, he really has let everyone down. Surely even Hank can’t get out this one.
