= Hank Zipzer (TV series) =

- Genre: Sitcom
- Created by: Henry Winkler
- Based on: Hank Zipzer: The World's Greatest Underachiever by Henry Winkler and Lin Oliver
- Starring: Nick James; Jayden Jean Paul-Denis; Chloe Wong; Felicity Montagu; Nick Mohammed; Jude Foley; Juliet Cowan; Neil Fitzmaurice; Vincenzo Nicoli; Madeline Holliday; Henry Winkler; Alicia Lai; Javone Prince
- Theme music composer: Oli Julian; Nick Foster
- Composers: Oli Julian; Nick Foster
- Countries of origin: United Kingdom; Canada
- Original language: English
- No. of series: 3
- No. of episodes: 39 (list of episodes)

Production
- Executive producers: Helen McAleer; Julia Posen; Melanie Stokes; Anne Brogan (series 1); Steven DeNure (series 1 & 3); Shayna Fine (series 2)
- Producers: Siobhan Bachman (series 1); Ali Brayer Carron (series 1); Jim Poyser (series 2); Richard Grocock (series 3)
- Cinematography: Craig Feather; Len Gowing; Douglas Hartington; Andy Hibbert
- Running time: 22 minutes
- Production companies: Kindle Entertainment; Walker Productions; DHX Media

Original release
- Network: CBBC
- Release: 28 January 2014 – 12 December 2016

Hank Zipzer is a British children's television series created by Henry Winkler, based on the book series of the same name by Winkler and Lin Oliver. It stars Nick James as the 12-year-old dyslexic schoolboy, Hank Zipzer. Winkler also portrays Mr. Rock, Hank's music teacher. Unlike the books that took place in Winkler's native United States, the series takes place in London, in the United Kingdom. It also included a 2016 Christmas special, Hank Zipzer's Christmas Catastrophe. HBO Max began streaming all three seasons on May 13, 2022, and began streaming Hank Zipzer's Christmas Catastrophe on December 2, 2022. The series is produced by Kindle Entertainment, Walker Productions and DHX Media for CBBC.

== Plot ==
The series focuses on the misadventures of Hank Zipzer, a 12-year-old schoolboy in London who is dyslexic. Hank's friends are named Frankie and Ashley, and Nick McKelty is his worst enemy.

== Cast ==
Cast list of Hank Zipzer
Actor	Character	Series				Episodes			
Actor	Character	1	2	3	Special	Series 1	Series 2	Series 3	Special
Nick James	Henry "Hank" Pete Zipzer	Main	Main	Main	Main	13 / 13			1 / 1
Chloe Wong	Ashley	Main	—N/a	—N/a	—N/a	13 / 13	—N/a	—N/a	—N/a
Alicia Lai	Ashley	—N/a	Main	Main	Main	—N/a	12 / 12	13 / 13	1 / 1
Felicity Montagu	Miss Fanny Adolf	Main	Main	Main	Main	13 / 13	12 / 12	13 / 13	1 / 1
Nick Mohammed	Mr. Leland Love	Recurring	Main	Guest	—N/a	9 / 13	11 / 13	1 / 13	—N/a
Javone Prince	Mr. Adam Joy	—N/a	Main	Main	Main	—N/a	11 / 13		—N/a
Juliet Cowan	Rosa	Main	Main	Main	Main				
Neil Fitzmaurice	Stanlay "Stan" Zipzer	Main	Main	Main	Main				
Jude Foley	Nicolas "Nick" McKelty	Main	Main	Main	Main				
Henry Winkler	Mr. Rock	Main	Main	Main	Main				
Jayden Jean-Paul-Denis	Frankie	Main	Main	Main	Main				
Madeline Holliday	Emily Gabriela Zipzer	Main	Main	Main	Main				
Vincenzo Nicoli	Peter Zipzer "Papa Pete"	Main	Main	Main	Main				
Dominic Coleman	Micky "Mick" McKelty	Guest	Guest	Guest	—N/a				

== Episodes ==
The first season premiered in January 2014 on CBBC. Unlike the books that took place in America, the series takes place in Britain. The second season began airing on 13 August 2015. Javone Prince made his first appearance as Mr. Joy in series 2, episode 5, "Hank's Hero". The third season began airing on 26 May 2016, which was followed by an 84-minute Christmas television film, Hank Zipzer's Christmas Catastrophe, in December 2016.

Series	Episodes	Originally released	
Series	Episodes	First released	Last released
1	13	28 January 2014	22 April 2014
2	13	13 August 2015	5 November 2015
3	13	26 May 2016	18 August 2016
Hank Zipzer's Christmas Catastrophe		12 December 2016	

== Production ==
=== Development ===
Henry Winkler has stated that they "could not sell the show in America. We couldn't sell the books. They said, 'Oh Hank Zipzer is so funny...but we won't do the television show. So we sold it to the BBC." At a later date, after the series was successful on the BBC, it was broadcast on the Universal Kids Channel in the United States.

CBBC commissioned the series in 2013 to be produced by Kindle Entertainment, and filming commenced in October 2013. Matt Bloom was the lead director on all three series.

=== Casting ===
Nick James was cast as Hank, while Henry Winkler was cast as the music teacher Mr. Rock (who was based on a music teacher Winkler once had in high school at McBurney). Winkler said that the real Mr. Rock was the only teacher in his high school who believed in him. In particular, when he was in the eleventh grade, this teacher told him: “Winkler if you ever do get out of here you are going to be great,” a statement that helped him get through school.

=== Filming ===
The show was filmed at St Catherine's Catholic High School in Halifax, Yorkshire for series 1–2. Series 3 was filmed at Birkdale High School in Dewsbury, Yorkshire.

=== Series changes ===
==== Second series ====
On 9 June 2014, Cheryl Taylor, the CBBC Controller, announced that the show had been renewed for a second series of thirteen episodes. Nick James, Henry Winkler, Felicity Montagu, and Nick Mohammed were all confirmed to return, as Hank, Mr. Rock, Miss Adolf, and Mr. Love respectively. Additionally, Javone Prince joined the main cast as Mr. Joy.

Jon Macqueen replaced script editors Lucy Guy and Danny Springs, while Jim Poyser joined as a producer. Returning writers include Mark Oswin and Madeleine Brettingham, who each wrote one episode and former script editor Lucy Guy, who wrote two. Several new writers worked on the second series, including Jon Macqueen (two episodes), Mark Evans (one episode), and Adam G. Goodwin & Jonathan Parkyn (one episode).

=== Cancellation ===
In April 2017, Neil Fitzmaurice, who played Stan, Hank's father, confirmed that there would not be another series of the show.

== Reception ==
=== Release ===
Announcements began to circulate in November 2013 that CBBC (the BBC's children's channel) had commissioned a television series of thirteen 30-minute episodes based on the Hank Zipzer books, while Kindle Entertainment, Walker Productions, and DHX Media partnered to create the series that would be debuting in early 2014. Winkler also announced the debut of the series at the 2013 British Academy of Film and Television Arts awards.

=== Broadcasts ===
The show ran for three series (and one Christmas special), from January 2014 to December 2016 on the CBBC channel. All three seasons of the series stream globally on HBO Max, and in the U.K. on BBC iPlayer. HBO Max began streaming Hank Zipzer's Christmas Catastrophe on December 2, 2022.

== Awards ==
Nick James won the British Academy Children's Awards for Performer for his portrayal of Hank Zipzer in 2016. When discussing the award, James noted that he has received tweets from parents and children that the show has helped them understand and come to terms with dyslexia.

Year	Award	Category	Nominee	Result
2016	International Emmy Awards	Kids: Series	Hank Zipzer	Nominated
2016	British Academy Children's Awards	Performer	Nick James as Hank Zipzer	Won
2017	British Academy Children's Awards	Comedy	Hank Zipzer	Nominated

== See also ==
- List of artistic depictions of dyslexia
