= Help! Somebody Get Me Out of Fourth Grade! =

2004 children's novel by Henry Winkler and Lin Oliver

Help! Somebody Get me out of Fourth Grade!
- Author: Henry Winkler and Lin Oliver
- Language: English
- Series: Hank Zipzer
- Genre: Children's novel
- Publisher: Grosset & Dunlap
- Publication date: 2004
- Publication place: United States
- Media type: Print (Paperback)
- Preceded by: Holy Enchilada!
- Followed by: Summer School! What Genius Thought That Up?

Help! Somebody Get me out of Fourth Grade! is the seventh book in the Hank Zipzer book series. It was written by Henry Winkler and Lin Oliver, and released in December 2004 by Grosset & Dunlap.

== Plot summary ==
When his parents get called for a parent-teacher conference, Hank just knows his teacher is going to tell them he is being held back. Hank and his best friends Ashley Wong and Frankie Townsend plans to send Hank's parents to a rock concert in Philadelphia at the same date and they accept! Hank is thrilled to be going into fifth grade. until his parents come back early! Hank remembers that it's family game night, so he decides to go to the pizza parlor and play in the arcade. Everything is going fine until Hank’s teacher, Mrs. Adolf, calls and reminds Hank's parents about the conference. They decide to postpone the trip and visit. After the conference, Hank finds out that he will have to attend summer school in order to pass the 4th grade.

== Main characters ==
- Hank Zipzer – Hank is a fourth-grader at P.S. 87 who has dyslexia. Frankie Townsend and Ashley Wong are his two best friends. His real name is Henry Daniel.
- Frankie Townsend – Frankie is Hank's best friend who is described as being very smart.
- Ashley Wong – Ashley, dubbed Ashweena by Hank and Frankie, is Hank's other best friend who loves rhinestones.
- Nick McKelty – Nick, dubbed "Nick the Tick" by the Magik 3 (the group formed by Hank, Frank, and Ashley), is their rival. He often teases Hank for his dyslexia and is described as being annoying and a braggart.
- Randi Zipzer – Hank's mother, who runs the Crunchy Pickle Deli and insists that the family eat healthily.
- Mrs. Adolf – Hank's teacher. She is described as being very boring and strict.
