= Niagara Falls, or Does It? =

Book by Henry Winkler and Lin Oliver

Niagara Falls, or Does it?
- Book cover
- Author: Henry Winkler and Lin Oliver
- Illustrator: Jesse Joshua Watson
- Language: English
- Series: Hank Zipzer
- Genre: Children's novel
- Publisher: Grosset & Dunlap
- Publication date: 2003
- Publication place: United States
- Media type: Print (Paperback)
- Pages: 133 pp
- ISBN: 0-448-43162-9
- Followed by: I Got a "D" in Salami

Niagara Falls, or Does it? (2003, ISBN 0-448-43162-9 ) is the first book in the Hank Zipzer series, written by Henry Winkler and Lin Oliver, illustrated by Jesse Joshua Watson and published by Grosset & Dunlap.

== Plot summary ==
Hank starts a new year at his school and meets his new teacher, who has her students write an essay about their summer vacations. Hank has a hard time with homework and with staying on task, thus making his essay a difficult assignment. Meanwhile, his grandpa, Papa Pete, asks Hank and his friends Ashley Wong and Frankie Townsend (the Magik 3, the name Hank gave to himself and his friends) to put on a magic show at his bowling league game. However, his teacher made a statement to Hank saying she can't wait to see his creative report, so he has to do his report and perform for Papa Pete. Hank decides to make a model of Niagara Falls - the place where he spent his vacation - rather than write about it, but when he presents the project in class, he accidentally floods the classroom.

Hank is given two weeks of punishment at school and at home. His punishment includes not being able to participate in the magic show for Papa Pete's bowling league. Finally, after a lot of convincing, his parents allow him to do the magic show. It was a relief to all the people at the bowling alley because class bully and overall idiot Nick McKelty was performing in the Magik 3's place. The magic show happens, and McKelty gets laughed at for his lame performance and thrown off stage, where the Magik 3 performs a great magic trick and the audience applauds. In the end, things go well for Hank, as he also meets the new music teacher, Mr. Rock, during detention, and they instantly like each other. Mr. Rock helps Hank with his essay and talks with his parents about his learning disabilities, which no one knew Hank had.

== Other characters ==
- Ashley Wong – Ashley, dubbed Ashweena by Hank and Frankie, is Hank's best friend who really loves rhinestones. She is Taiwanese-American.
- Frankie Townsend – another one of Hank's best friends.
- Robert Upchurch - Robert, a 3rd grader who lives in Hank, Frankie & Ashley's building. He is annoying to the other kids - he knows many facts, especially numbers and skipped the 2nd grade. Ultimately, he is helpful to them and befriends them.
- Nick McKelty – Nicknamed "Nick the Tick" by the Magik 3 (the magic group formed by Ashley, Hank, and Frankie), Nick is their rival, described as an extremely annoying, mean bully. He also has a tendency to exaggerate, which Hank and his friends call "The McKelty factor". For example, Nick once said that he got the best seats for a game when he actually just watched it on TV.
- Papa Pete – Papa Pete is Hank's grandfather, whom him and his friends are very close toward. He and Hank love eating pickles together.
- Emily Zipzer – Hank's younger sister. She is in the third grade at P.S. 87 and is described as being very smart, but also annoying. She has a pet iguana named Katherine.
- Mr. Rock – The new music teacher at P.S. 87. He meets Hank at the end of the book, and they instantly like each other.
- Randi Zipzer – Hank's mother, who runs the Crunchy Pickle Deli and insists that the entire family eat healthy food.
- Stanley Zipzer – Hank's father, who is extremely obsessed with crossword puzzles.
- Ms. Adolf – Hank's teacher. She is described as being very boring and strict, with the noticeable reference to Adolf Hitler.
- Principal Love – Hank's principal at his school the kids describe him for having a mole resembling the Statue of Liberty, but without the torch.
