= I Got a "D" in Salami =

Book by Henry Winkler and Lin Oliver

- Book cover
- Author: Henry Winkler and Lin Oliver
- Illustrator: Jesse Joshua Watson
- Language: English
- Series: Hank Zipzer
- Genre: School Story
- Publisher: Grosset & Dunlap
- Publication date: 2003
- Media type: Book
- Pages: 167
- Preceded by: Niagara Falls, or Does It?
- Followed by: Day of the Iguana

I Got a "D" in Salami is the second book in the Hank Zipzer series. The book was written by Henry Winkler and Lin Oliver and was published by Grosset & Dunlap and cover illustrated by Jesse Joshua Watson.

== Plot ==
Hank gets his first report card from 4th grade. He goes to his mom's deli to show her. While this is going on, his mom is making a special salami to give to a leader of a supermarket chain. Hank decides to get rid of his report card before his parents see it. He gives it to Robert to destroy. Robert puts it in a batch of salami. Once his mom is done making many batches of the salami, she picks the one with the report card in it. Hank and his friends try to put a stop to the delivery but they don't stop the deliveryman in time. While this is going on Hank figures out he has learning problems. In the end, Hank begins eating his sandwich while visiting the Press for the large supermarket chain and gets a business deal for his mom's deli.
