= Holy Enchilada! =

Book by Henry Winkler and Lin Oliver

- Author: Henry Winkler and Lin Oliver
- Language: English
- Series: Hank Zipzer
- Genre: Children's novel
- Publisher: Grosset & Dunlap
- Publication date: 2004
- Publication place: United States
- Media type: Print (Paperback)
- Preceded by: The Night I Flunked My Field Trip
- Followed by: Help! Somebody Get me out of Fourth Grade!

Holy Enchilada! is the sixth book in the Hank Zipzer book series by Henry Winkler and Lin Oliver.

== Plot summary ==
Hank has been chosen to host a Japanese boy named Yoshi. Hank also needs to prepare some enchiladas for his school multi-cultural day. He added too much chili powder and that's why he gets into trouble.

== Main characters ==
- Hank Zipzer – Hank is a fourth-grader at P.S. 87 who has dyslexia. Frankie Townsend and Ashley Wong are his two best friends. His real name is Henry Daniel.
- Frankie Townsend – Frankie is Hank's best friend who is described as being very smart.
- Ashley Wong – Ashley, dubbed Ashweena by Hank and Frankie, is Hank's other best friend who loves rhinestones.
- Nick McKelty – Nick, dubbed "Nick the Tick" by the Magik 3 (the group formed by Hank, Frank, and Ashley), is their rival. He often teases Hank for his dyslexia and is described as being annoying and a braggart.
- Papa Pete – Hank's grandfather, with whom him and his friends are very close to.
- Emily Zipzer – Hank's younger sister. She is in the third grade at P.S. 87 and is described as being very smart, but also annoying. She has a pet iguana named Katherine.
- Robert Upchurch – Robert is described as scrawny and a nerd.
- Yoshi Morimoto - A boy Hank hosts from Japan.
- Mr. Morimoto - Yoshi's father.
- Randi Zipzer– Hank's mother, who runs the Crunchy Pickle Deli and insists that the family eat healthily.
- Stanley Zipzer– Hank's father, who is obsessed with crossword puzzles.
- Mrs. Adolf – Hank's teacher. She is described as being very boring and strict.
