= Chloe Thomas =

Film and TV director and producer

- Occupation: Television director
- Years active: 2001–present

Chloe Thomas is a film and TV director and producer, known for her work on Hetty Feather, nominated for a BAFTA (Children's Award) in the category of Best Drama, and on Horrible Histories, nominated for a BAFTA (Children's Award) in the category of Best Factual.

== Career ==
Chloe Thomas has worked with Bwark Productions to produce the short film Shop Girl Diaries and the television series Angelo's, written by Sharon Horgan, which ran for six episodes.

== Selected filmography ==
Year	Film/TV	Role	Notes
2001	Daisy, Daisy	Director	TV series
2002	Closed Circuit	Director	Short film
2007	Angelo's	Director	TV series
2009	Horrible Histories	Director	TV series
2012	Shop Girl Diaries	Director	Short film
2015	Hetty Feather	Director	Drama
2016	Hetty Feather	Director	Drama
2019	Victoria	Director	Drama
2019	Harlots	Director	Drama
2020	The Deceived	Director	Drama
2022	Murder in Provence	Director	Drama
