= Day of the Iguana =

Book by Henry Winkler and Lin Oliver

- Author: Henry Winkler and Lin Oliver
- Illustrator: Carol Heyer
- Language: English
- Series: Hank Zipzer
- Genre: Children's novel
- Publisher: Grosset & Dunlap
- Publication date: 2003
- Publication place: United States
- Media type: Print (Paperback)
- ISBN: 0-448-43212-9
- Preceded by: I Got a "D" in Salami
- Followed by: The Zippity Zinger

Day of the Iguana is the third book in the Hank Zipzer series by Henry Winkler and Lin Oliver. The title is a reference to The Night of the Iguana, a play by Tennessee Williams.

== Plot summary ==
Hank and his two best friends, Frankie and Ashley, perform magic tricks at Hank's 3-year-old cousin's birthday party. Performing at the party means that Frankie will have to miss The Mutant Moth That Ate Toledo, a movie he has been looking forward to, but Hank promises to record the movie for him. However, since Hank has dyslexia, he accidentally records the wrong channel, making Frankie very upset.

Hank takes apart a cable box to see how it works for his school science project, but then his sister's pet iguana, Katherine, lays eggs in it. Afraid that his father will discover the cable box taken apart, Hank orders a new one. Tom, the new cable box installer, happens to be knowledgeable about iguanas. That night they witness 23 baby iguanas hatching. Tom agrees to give Hank a tape of The Mutant Moth That Ate Toledo in exchange for a baby iguana, and Hank and Frankie watch the movie together.

== Characters ==
- Hank Zipzer – Hank is a fourth-grader at P.S. 87 who has dyslexia. Frankie Townsend and Ashley Wong are his two best friends. His real name is Henry Daniel.
- Frankie Townsend – Frankie is Hank's best friend who is described as being very smart.
- Ashley Wong – Ashley, dubbed Ashweena by Hank and Frankie, is Hank's other best friend who loves rhinestones.
- Nick McKelty – Nick, dubbed "Nick the Tick" by the Magik 3 (the group formed by Hank, Frankie, and Ashley) is their rival. He often teases Hank for his dyslexia and is described as being annoying and a braggart.
- Papa Pete – Hank's grandfather, with whom him and his friends are very close to.
- Emily Zipzer – Hank's younger sister. She is in the third grade at P.S. 87 and is described as being very smart, but also annoying. She has a pet iguana named Katherine.
- Robert Upchurch – Robert is described as scrawny and a nerd.
- Tom – The man hired to install the Zipzers' new cable box who knows a lot about iguanas.
- Randi Zipzer – Hank's mother, who runs the Crunchy Pickle Deli and insists that the family eat healthily.
- Stanley Zipzer – Hank's father, who is obsessed with crossword puzzles.
- Ms. Adolf – Hank's teacher. She is described as being very boring and strict.
- Jake and Zack – Hank's 3-year-old cousins, whom Hank, Frankie, and Ashley perform for on their birthday. Jake bites people and
