= Hank Zipzer's Christmas Catastrophe =

British television film

- Genre: Comedy
- Created by: Henry Winkler; Lin Oliver
- Based on: Characters by Henry Winkler and Lin Oliver
- Written by: Joe Williams; Debbie Isitt
- Directed by: Matt Bloom
- Starring: Nick James; Felicity Montagu; Javone Prince; Alicia Lai; Jayden Jean Paul-Denis; Madeline Holliday; Juliet Cowan; Neil Fitzmaurice; Jude Foley; Vincenzo Nicoli; Kylee Russell; Henry Winkler
- Composers: Nick Foster; Oli Julian
- Country of origin: United Kingdom
- Original language: English

Production
- Editor: Jake Bernard
- Running time: 90 minutes
- Production companies: Kindle Entertainment; Walker Productions; DHX Media

Original release
- Network: CBBC
- Release: 12 December 2016

Hank Zipzer's Christmas Catastrophe is a 2016 standalone British Christmas television film, that appeared during Season three of the Hank Zipzer (TV series). It is an adaptation of the Hank Zipzer book series by American actor Henry Winkler and children's book author Lin Oliver. HBO Max began streaming Hank Zipzer's Christmas Catastrophe on December 2, 2022.

== Plot ==
It is Christmas and the Zipzer family are preparing for a new baby. Meanwhile, Mr. Rock's Rudolph the Rock 'n' Roll Reindeer is soon turned into a one-woman Christmas Carol by Miss Adolf. Mr. Joy hates Christmas and wants to cancel it altogether but Hank causes a Christmas catastrophe. His catastrophe leads to his friends being arrested, and a Christmas tree nearly gets plummeted into a crowd. But will everything go to plan before Hank's new baby brother is born?

== Cast ==
- Nick James as Hank Zipzer
- Henry Winkler as Mr. Rock
- Juliet Cowan as Rosa Zipzer
- Neil Fitzmaurice as Stan Zipzer
- Madeline Holliday as Emily Zipzer
- Kylee Russell as Hayden Chase
- Jayden Jean Paul-Denis as Frankie Townsend
- Alicia Lai as Ashley Wong
- Felicity Montagu as Miss Adolf
- Javone Prince as Mr. Joy
- Jude Foley as Nick McKelty
- Vincenzo Nicoli as Papa Pete
- Daisy Beaumont as Tammy
- Rebecca Root as Camilla
- Paul Chan as Jonathan Lao
- Marcus Garvey as Security Bob
- Cel Spellman as Radio DJ
- Richard Thomson as Director
- Nikki Helens as Nurse
- Jessica Ryan as Skater
- Sureni Kay as Receptionist
- Colin Parry as Police Officer
- Dan Carey as Taxi Driver

== Production ==
The film is written by Joe Williams and Debbie Isitt, and directed by Matt Bloom. It is produced by Kindle Entertainment in association with Walker Productions and DHX Media with support from Screen Yorkshire's Yorkshire Content Fund.

Production on Hank Zipzer's Christmas Catastrophe began on 26 July 2016 and ended on 18 August 2016. The film was commissioned by Cheryl Taylor, Controller of CBBC. The executive producers for the film are BBC's Amy Buscombe and Anne Brogan, the writers are Joe Williams and Debbie Isitt, who had written the three films of the Nativity series, and the director is Matt Bloom.

== Release ==
The film aired on CBBC on 12 December 2016. HBO Max began streaming Hank Zipzer's Christmas Catastrophe on December 2, 2022.

=== Awards and nominations ===
The film was nominated for an International Emmy Kids award under the category of TV Movie/Mini-Series and a BAFTA children's award in 2017. The film then won the aforementioned International Emmy Kids award in the awards ceremony the next year. The film was also nominated for numerous other awards.

== See also ==
- List of Christmas films
