= Neil Fitzmaurice =

English actor, comedian and writer (born 1969)

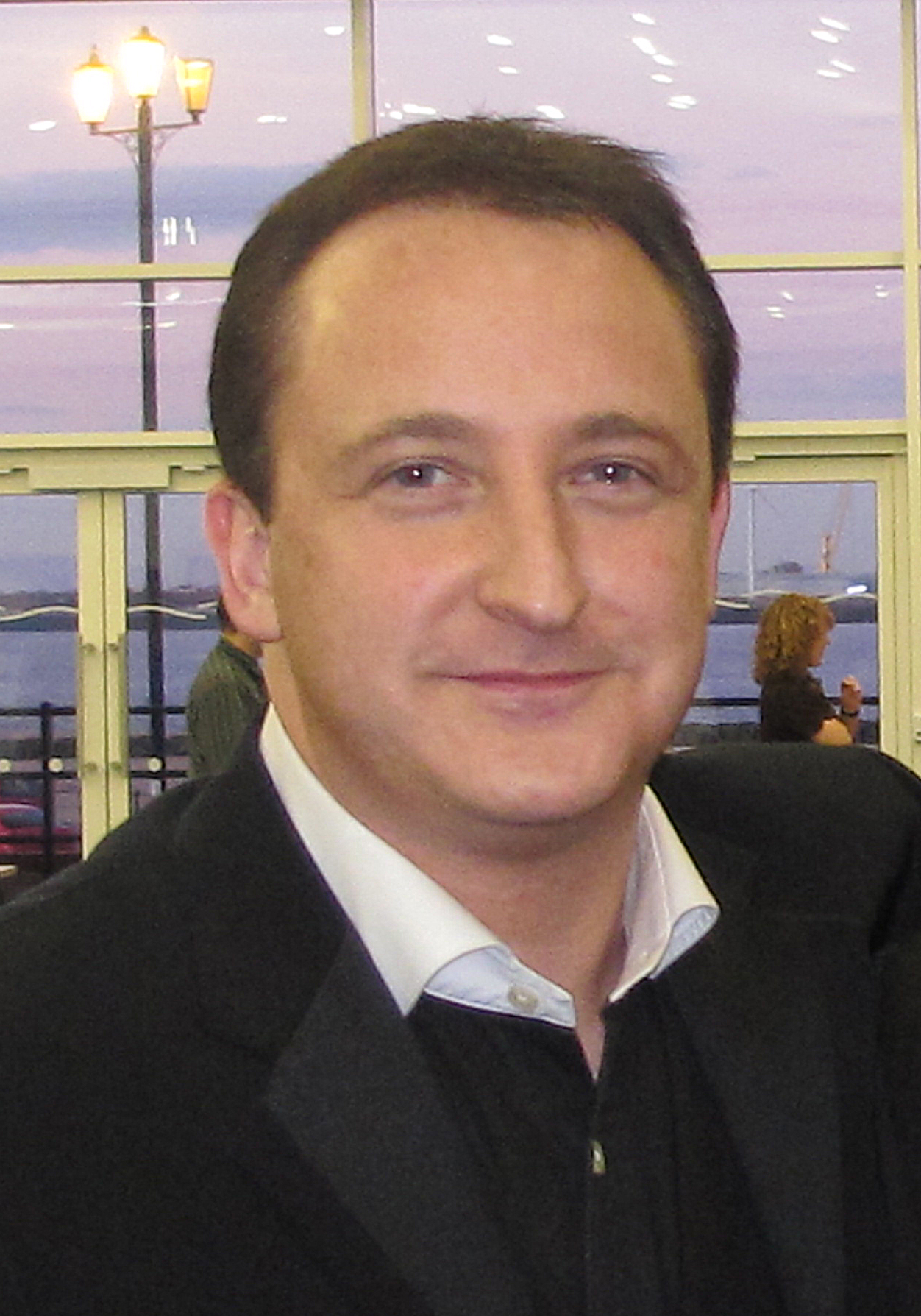
- Fitzmaurice in February 2010
- Born: Neil Simon Fitzmaurice; 20 August 1969 (age 57); Liverpool, England
- Other name: Neil Anthony
- Occupations: Actor; comedian; writer
- Years active: 1990–present
- Children: 4

Neil Simon Fitzmaurice (born 20 August 1969) is an English actor, comedian, and writer. He is best known for his role as Jeff, the love rival of protagonist Mark Corrigan, in the Channel 4 sitcom Peep Show (2003–2015). He has written for a number of other sitcoms, including Phoenix Nights (2001–2002) and Benidorm (2007–2018); both of which he has also starred in.

== Early life ==
Fitzmaurice was born and raised in Liverpool. He is the youngest of four brothers.

== Career ==
=== Writing ===
Fitzmaurice's writing projects include That Peter Kay Thing, for which he received a British Comedy Award, and the critically acclaimed Phoenix Nights, in which he also appeared as "Ray Von". He has also written two feature films: Going Off Big Time, in 1999, which was nominated for four BIFA awards and is part of Film Four's Best of British, and more recently Charlie Noades R.I.P.

=== Acting ===
As an actor, Fitzmaurice has appeared in Going Off Big Time (which he also wrote), played Jeff in the Channel 4 comedy series Peep Show, and starred in the prison drama series Buried. He appeared on the first episode of The Office as the applicant whom David Brent interviews for the warehouse position. He plays the same character in the sixth episode, only this time Brent is giving him a redundancy notice. Fitzmaurice has also performed alongside Paul O'Grady in the BBC comedy Eyes Down, had guest roles in the long-running police drama The Bill and on the Casualty spin-off Holby City.

In 2007, he played a lead role in the ITV drama Mobile, as an ex-telecoms worker suffering from a terminal brain tumour. From 2000 he worked on the film Charlie Noades RIP with his brother Tony. The film was in development hell due to funding not being available. Work finally began in 2007, despite the full budget not being in place. The film premiered at the Cannes Film Festival in 2009. Around the time of the premiere, Fitzmaurice returned to the stage for the first time in ten years, playing Shaun in On the Ledge at Liverpool's Royal Court Theatre.

Fitzmaurice played Les in an episode of the BBC One miniseries Moving On, "Dress to Impress", as well as the film Fifteen Minutes That Shook the World as the Liverpool manager Rafa Benitez. He starred in the hit play "One Night in Istanbul" at the Liverpool Empire and Dublin's Grand Canal Theatre.

On 16 February 2009, Fitzmaurice started presenting the Drivetime show on Radio City 96.7 in Liverpool. Due to film and television commitments, he left this position on 4 March 2011.

In 2011, Fitzmaurice starred in British school drama Waterloo Road as Dave Dowling, a parent with xenophobic and racist views. In 2011 he also starred in the fourth series of Benidorm as Lucky Kev who lived in the same caravan campsite as Madge Harvey. He later appeared in the fifth episode of the series reprising the role of Lucky Kev who works at a bar in Benidorm which Madge Harvey was interested in buying.

In 2013, he appeared in one episode of Truckers. In 2014 he starred as Dad in the BBC comedy series Hank Zipzer.

From 2011 to 2017 Fitzmaurice starred in the Sky comedy-drama Mount Pleasant, playing the part of office manager Fergus.

In 2023, it was announced Fitzmaurice would be re-joining Series 11 of Waterloo Road as history teacher Neil Guthrie. He has appeared as a series regular throughout the following three series. It has also been confirmed he will be resuming his role in Series 14 of the show.

== Personal life ==
Fitzmaurice is a Liverpool FC fan and a survivor of the Hillsborough disaster, later being featured in the 2009 documentary Hillsborough Remembered.

== Filmography ==
Year	Title	Role	Notes
1990–1991	Brookside	Greg Sinnott	Recurring role, 13 episodes
1994	Coronation Street	Electricity Man	1 episode
2000	That Peter Kay Thing	Various	
2000	Going Off Big Time	Mark Clayton	
2001	The Bill	DC Phil Raven	
2001	The Office	Alex	
2001–2002	Phoenix Nights	Ray Von	Main cast
2003	Holby City	Stas Andrews	
2003	Buried	Chris Russo	Main cast
2003–2004	Eyes Down	Bobby Rutt	Main cast
2003–2015	Peep Show	Jeff Heaney	Main cast
2005	Pierrepoint	Cliff the Scouser	Film
2006	Doctors	Timothy Graham	Guest role
2006	Vincent	Eddie Price	Guest role
2007	Mobile	Eddie Doig	Main cast
2007	The Street	DS Barns	
2007	Blue Murder	Mark Turton	Guest role
2008	Casualty 1907	Thomas Hooley	Main cast
2009	Kröd Mändoon and the Flaming Sword of Fire	Max The MC	
2009	Moving On	Terry	1 episode
2009	Nativity!	Oakmoor Parent	Film
2009	Fifteen Minutes That Shook the World	Rafael Benitez	
2011	Waterloo Road	Dave Dowling	Guest role
2011	Benidorm	Lucky Kev	Series 4
2011–2017	Mount Pleasant	Fergus	Main cast
2013	Truckers	Vince	
2014–2016	Hank Zipzer	Stan Zipzer	Main cast
2016	The Aliens	Niall	Main cast
2016	Hank Zipzer's Christmas Catastrophe	Stan Zipzer	Television film
2018	Walk Like A Panther	Cliff 'Edge' Morris	Film
2019	Clink	Baldwin Flowers	1 episode
2019	In the Long Run	Dennis	2 episodes
2019–2020	Semi-Detached	Charlie	6 episodes
2019–2025	Brassic	Mr. Bishop	10 episodes
2020	The First Team	Darren Turner	3 episodes
2020	Tin Star	Taxi Driver	1 episode
2023–present	Waterloo Road	Neil Guthrie	Main cast
2024	The Responder	D.I. Kennedy	1 episode
