= Mrs. Warren's Profession =

1902 play by George Bernard Shaw

Mrs Warren's Profession
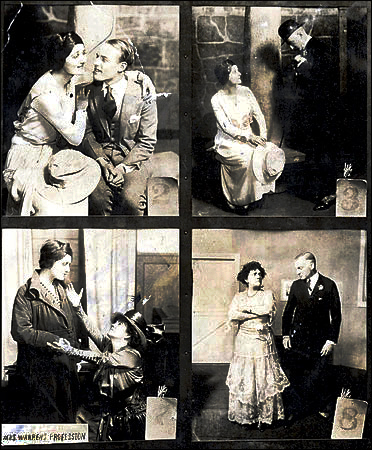
- A 1918 production directed by and starring Mary Shaw (pictured in the two lower frames).
- Written by: George Bernard Shaw
- Original language: English
- Subject: The madam of a string of brothels justifies her career to her daughter
- Genre: Problem play
- Setting: A cottage at Haslemere, Surrey

Premiere
- Date premiered: Stage Society, 5 January 1902 (private)
- Place premiered: New Lyric Club

Mrs Warren's Profession is a 1893 play by George Bernard Shaw, first performed in London in 1902. It was included in Shaw's 1898 collection Plays Unpleasant, alongside The Philanderer and Widowers' Houses. The story concerns a former prostitute, now a madam (brothel proprietor), who attempts to come to terms with her disapproving daughter. It is a problem play, offering social commentary to argue that prostitution was not caused by moral failure but by economic necessity. Shaw borrowed several elements from his own 1882 novel Cashel Byron's Profession, about a man who becomes a boxer due to limited employment opportunities.

== Summary ==
The story centres on the relationship between Mrs Kitty Warren and her daughter, Vivie. Mrs Warren, a former prostitute and current brothel owner, is described as "on the whole, a genial and fairly presentable old blackguard of a woman." Vivie, an intelligent and pragmatic young woman who has just graduated from university, has come home to get acquainted with her mother. The play focuses on how their relationship changes when Vivie learns what her mother does for a living. It explains why Mrs Warren became a prostitute, condemns the hypocrisies relating to prostitution, and criticises the limited employment opportunities available for women in Victorian Britain.

== Plot ==
Vivie Warren, a thoroughly modern young woman, has just graduated from the University of Cambridge with high honours in Mathematics (equal Third Wrangler). Her mother, Mrs Warren, who has been a distant figure during Vivie's childhood in boarding schools and college, arranges for her to meet her friend Mr Praed, a middle-aged, handsome architect, at the house where Vivie is staying. Mrs Warren arrives with her business partner, Sir George Crofts, who is attracted to Vivie despite their 25-year age difference. Vivie flirts with the youthful waster Frank Gardner. Frank's father, the Reverend Samuel Gardner, has a past history with Vivie's mother; indeed, he may be Vivie's out-of-wedlock father, making Vivie and Frank half-siblings.

Mrs Warren tells her daughter that following a destitute childhood she had gone into her profession due to absolute economic necessity. Having eventually saved enough money to buy into a business, she helped develop and run a chain of brothels across Europe. By her self-respect and self-control, she says, she pulled herself out of the gutter and lived a life of independence, able to provide her daughter with a first-rate education. Vivie is at first repulsed by the revelation of her mother's past, but then lauds her as a wonderful woman, "stronger than all England".

However, her opinion changes when Vivie discovers that her mother continues to own and operate the business with Sir George Crofts, despite now being wealthy and no longer in financial need. She is appalled to learn that her mother takes pleasure in her work and has no intention of giving it up. Vivie takes an office job in the city and breaks off her relationship with Frank, vowing she will never marry. She disowns her mother, leaving Mrs Warren heartbroken.

== Origins ==
Shaw said he wrote the play "to draw attention to the truth that prostitution is caused, not by female depravity and male licentiousness, but simply by underpaying, undervaluing and overworking women so shamefully that the poorest of them are forced to resort to prostitution to keep body and soul together." Shaw "addresses a social problem, organized prostitution, and dramatizes it through the character Vivie Warren."

He explained the source of the play in a letter to the Daily Chronicle on 28 April 1898:

Miss Janet Achurch [an actress and friend of Shaw’s] mentioned to me a novel by some French writer [Yvette by Guy de Maupassant] as having a dramatisable story in it. It being hopeless to get me to read anything, she told me the story... In the following autumn I was the guest of a lady (Beatrice Webb) of very distinguished ability—one whose knowledge of English social types is as remarkable as her command of industrial and political questions. She suggested that I should put on the stage a real modern lady of the governing class—not the sort of thing that theatrical and critical authorities imagine such a lady to be. I did so; and the result was Miss Vivie Warren ... Mrs Warren herself was my version of the heroine of the romance narrated by Miss Achurch. The tremendously effective scene—which a baby could write if its sight were normal—in which she justifies herself, is only a paraphrase of a scene in a novel of my own, Cashel Byron's Profession (hence the title, Mrs Warren's Profession), in which a prize-fighter shows how he was driven into the ring exactly as Mrs Warren was driven on the streets.

== Performance history ==
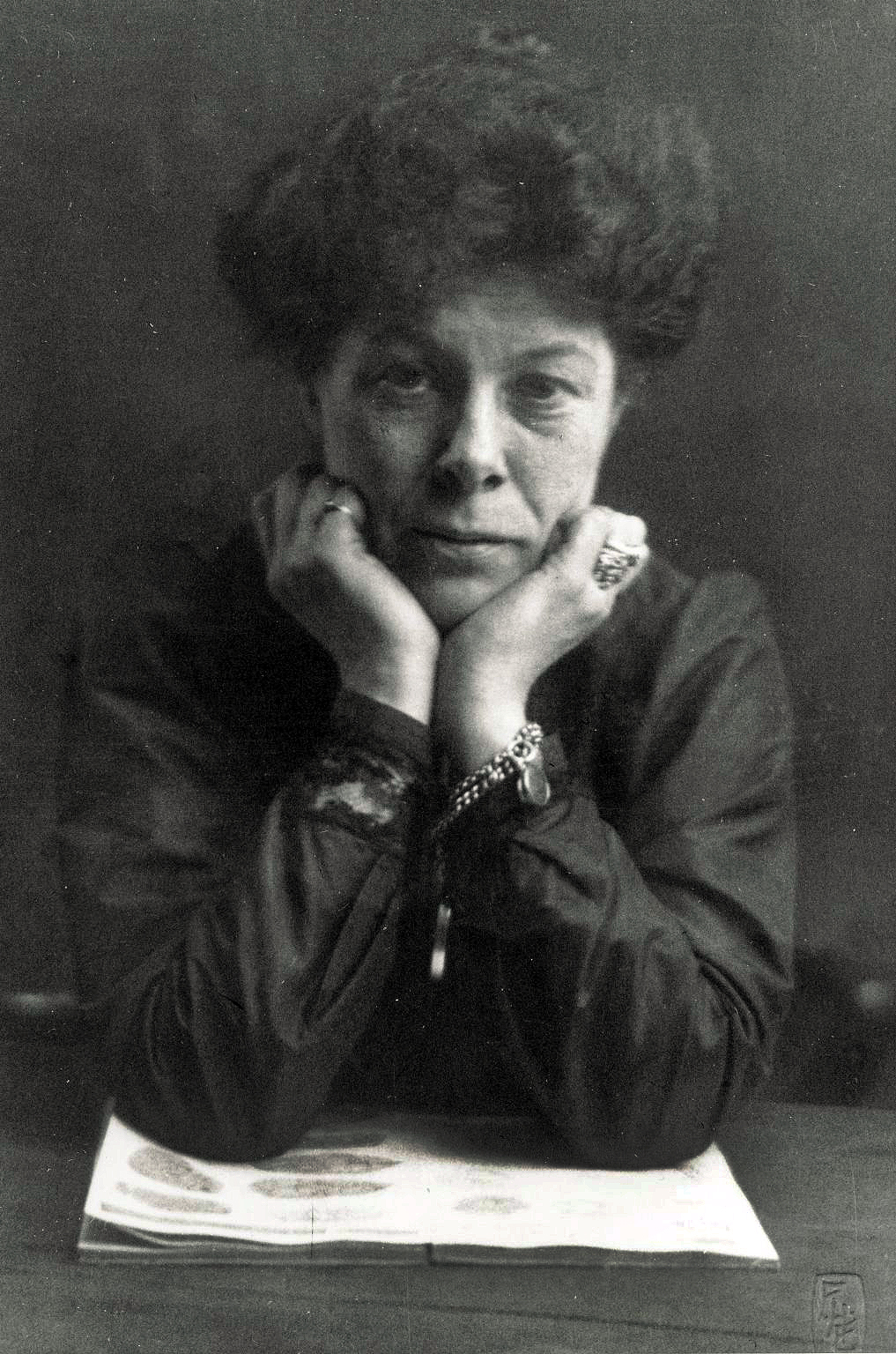
Fanny Brough as Mrs Warren in the 1902 London production. Part of a series of photographs of the production taken by Frederick H. Evans. According to a note in Cornell University Library's archive, playwright George Bernard Shaw referred to Evans as "the most artistic of photographers."

The play was originally banned by the Lord Chamberlain (Britain's official theatre censor) because of its frank discussion of prostitution, but was finally performed on Sunday, 5 January 1902, at London's New Lyric Club with the distinguished actor-manager Harley Granville-Barker as Frank, Fanny Brough as Mrs Warren, George Goodhart as Sir George Crofts, Julius Knight as Praed, Madge McIntosh as Vivie and Cosmo Stuart as the Rev. Samuel Gardner. Members-only clubs had been a device to avoid the eye of authority, but actors often also used the opportunity to invite their fellow-artists to a private showing of a play, usually on Sundays, when theatres were closed to the public. The first public performance in London took place in 1925.

A 1905 performance in New York, this time on a public stage, was interrupted by the police, who arrested the cast and crew for violating New York City's version of the Comstock laws. It was later held not to be in violation of the law, and has been revived on Broadway five times since. In December 1918 the play was produced in Perth, Australia by the actor manager Alan Wilkie and featured a friend and protégé of Shaw, Frediswyde Hunter-Watts, as Vivie Warren.

The play has been twice revived by the National Theatre, first in 1970–71 at the Old Vic, directed by Ronald Eyre, with Coral Browne and Sarah Badel, and more recently at the Lyttelton Theatre in 1985–86, directed by Anthony Page, with Joan Plowright and Jessica Turner as Mrs Warren and Vivie.

The 1976 Broadway revival featured Ruth Gordon as Kitty, Lynn Redgrave as Vivie, Philip Bosco as Sir George Crofts and Edward Herrmann as Frank Gardner. Tony Awards nominations went to Redgrave for "Best Actress in a Play" and Herrmann for "Best Featured Actor in a Play". Herrmann won a Tony.

The Shaw Festival at Niagara-on-the-Lake, Ontario has mounted the play five times since the Festival's inception in 1962: 1976, 1990, 1997, 2008, and 2016.

In 2006, it was revived off-Broadway by The Irish Repertory Theatre, with Dana Ivey as Mrs Warren, Laura Odeh as Vivie Warren, and David Staller as Mr Praed.

The play was revived in 2010 in three separate venues:

- London's West End, at the Comedy Theatre with Felicity Kendal in the title role
- Washington, by the Shakespeare Theatre Company at Sidney Harman Hall, with Elizabeth Ashley in the title role
- Broadway at the American Airlines Theatre under the auspices of the Roundabout Theatre Company, with Cherry Jones as Kitty Warren and Sally Hawkins as Vivie

It was performed by the Sydney Theatre Company in 2012, and was so popular that the season was extended.

In 2016 the play was performed at the Center Theatre in Seattle.

In 2018, Eleanor Bishop's adaptation of the play was performed at the ASB Waterfront Theatre in Auckland, New Zealand by the Auckland Theatre Company.

In 2021, the play ran off-Broadway at Theatre Row, produced by Gingold Theatrical Group.

In 2022, the play was performed at the Chichester Festival Theatre with Caroline Quentin as Mrs Warren and her daughter, Rose Quentin, as Vivie. The play ran from 30 November to 3 December, before going on tour in 2023 to venues including the Yvonne Arnaud Theatre in Guildford and the Everyman Theatre, Cheltenham.

In 2024 SHAW2020 Theatre Company toured their production of Mrs Warren's Profession, directed by Jonas Cemm. The tour visited the playwright's home, Shaw's Corner.

In 2025, the Garrick Theatre in London staged a production starring Imelda Staunton as Mrs Warren and her daughter Bessie Carter as Vivie.

== Sequel ==
Sir Harry Johnston wrote a sequel, a novel entitled Mrs Warren's Daughter, circa 1920.

== Adaptations ==
A 1960 German film adaption, Mrs Warren's Profession, starred Lilli Palmer.

BBC Television produced a television version first broadcast on 3 October 1972 on BBC2 under the 'Stage 2' drama strand. Produced by Cedric Messina and directed by Herbert Wise, it starred Coral Browne in the title role, with Penelope Wilton as Vivie. Also in the cast were James Grout, Robert Powell, Richard Pearson and Derek Godfrey. Under the Play of the Month strand, the production was repeated on BBC1 on 21 April 1974. The production was released on DVD in 2006.

A radio adaptation was broadcast on the BBC in 2002, and re-broadcast in January 2009 on BBC Radio 7, starring Maggie Steed in the title role.

Armen Pandola's Mrs Warren's e-Profession transforms the story by bringing it into modern times. Mrs Warren grows rich from her online porn and dating sites while her sheltered daughter recoils from the knowledge that her privileged life is based on the exploitation of women.

== Vivie's character and the changing role of women ==
Men who could afford to get married in the Victorian era could make use of “laws that gave him total control of his wife's person—and her fortune”. Victorian women were expected to maintain a poised and dignified manner, and to obey their husbands. Vivie defies the Victorian expectations of an obedient woman: she is educated and entirely self-sufficient. She rejects two marriage proposals, reflecting her reliance on her work ethic and hard-headed approach to life. Shaw represents Vivie as the product of a type of gender reformation: a character who is asexual and "permanently unromantic".

Throughout the play, the boundary between sexual desires and proposed marriages is blurred. Frank flirts with both Mrs Warren and Vivie; Mrs Warren's companion Sir George Crofts proposes marriage to Vivie despite his relationship with her mother. Critic Petra Dierkes-Thrun argues that these examples illustrate the way in which Shaw "critiqued the ideological and economic system that produced her [Mrs Warren], attacking the problematic double standard of male privilege and the deeply entrenched objectification of women, which Shaw saw pervading all levels of Victorian society down to its most basic nuclear element, the family."
