= Barfing in the Backseat: How I Survived My Family Road Trip =

Book by Henry Winkler and Lin Oliver

- Author: Henry Winkler and Lin Oliver
- Illustrator: Jesse Joshua Watson
- Language: English
- Series: Hank Zipzer
- Genre: Children's novel
- Publisher: Grosset & Dunlap
- Publication date: 2007
- Publication place: United States
- Media type: Print (paperback)
- Pages: 151 pp
- ISBN: 978-0448443287
- Preceded by: The Curtain Went Up, My Pants Went Down
- Followed by: Who Ordered This Baby? Definitely Not Me

Barfing in the Backseat: How I Survived My Family Road Trip is the twelfth book in the Hank Zipzer children's book series by Henry Winkler and Lin Oliver.

== Plot summary ==
In this story, the Zipzers take a road trip to a crossword puzzle tournament and a roller coaster park in North Carolina. But when he mistakenly leaves Mrs. Adolf's vacation homework packet at a motel, he and Frankie set out to have it delivered — without Mr. Zipzer finding out.
