= Juliet Cowan =

British actress

- Born: Belfast, Northern Ireland, UK
- Occupation: Actress
- Years active: 1993–present
- Known for: Hank Zipzer as Rosa (2014–2016)
- Television: This Life; The Sarah Jane Adventures; Back to Life

Juliet Cowan is a television, film and stage actress from Northern Ireland. Cowan has had various TV guest star roles in long-running shows such as EastEnders, Silent Witness, and Casualty. Cowan has also had a recurring role in the CBBC show The Sarah Jane Adventures, This Life, and BBC comedy Back to Life.

== Early life and education ==
Juliet Cowan was born in Belfast, Northern Ireland.

== Career ==
Cowan's first aired acting role was in the 1993 live performance video Raising Hell, by Iron Maiden, which was broadcast live on pay-per-view television in the United Kingdom and on MTV in North America. She was not credited for this performance, however. Cowan guest-starred in over 20 episodes of The Bill as Julie Saunders, the mother of the boy who accused PC Tony Stamp of sexual assault. She also starred in "The Wench Is Dead", the penultimate episode of the Inspector Morse series, as Joanna Franks, a Victorian woman who is murdered on board a canal boat.

She played recurring characters Nicki in This Life (1997), Carla in Series 7 of The Queen's Nose, air stewardess Polly Arnold in the Channel 5 soap opera Family Affairs (2001), Tanya in Pulling (2003), and Chrissie Jackson in The Sarah Jane Adventures, making her first appearance in the first episode "Invasion of the Bane" (2007). She was social worker Josie in two episodes of the series Shameless in 2009. In 2006, Cowan appeared in a short film entitled Goodbye to the Normals. It was a promotional video for Robbie Williams, directed by Jim Field Smith and featuring the song "Burslem Normals".

Cowan has also appeared in television adverts for Danone Actimel (2003 to 2004), Nationwide Building Society (2006), Cadbury (2007), and Cif cleaning products (2008) She was a finalist in the So You Think You're Funny competition at the 1999 Edinburgh Festival Fringe. On 5 March 2009, Cowan guest-starred in Episode 7, "JJ", of the third series of the teen drama Skins. She plays the mother of the character JJ and returned again in the sixth episode of the fourth series to reprise the role. In 2010 she appeared in two episodes of PhoneShop as Lance's wife Shelley, as well as in a Christmas advertisement for Boots; an appearance which has evolved into a more recurring role in subsequent commercials for Boots. Cowan played Sharon Watts's Bridesmaid Nina Hewland in EastEnders on 13–14 August 2012. From September 2012, she acted as Stanley Brown's mother in the CBBC programme The Revolting World of Stanley Brown. In late 2013 Cowan acted as Rosa Zipzer for the new CBBC programme Hank Zipzer along with Henry Winkler. Cowan appeared in an episode of Utopia for Channel 4 as Bridget in July 2014.

2018 saw her play real-life character Tracey Rogers in Killed by My Debt for the BBC. In 2022 she appeared in Dylan Moran sit-com Stuck.

In February 2023, it was announced that Cowan was added to the cast of the Amy Winehouse biopic Back to Black and would be playing Winehouse's mother Janis Winehouse-Collins.

== Filmography ==
=== Television ===
Year	Title	Role	Notes
1998	Inspector Morse: The Wench is Dead	Joanna Franks	
2003	Bounty Hamster	Cassie	Main role, voice
2006 – 2009	Pulling	Tanya	
2007 – 2008	The Sarah Jane Adventures	Chrissie Jackson	
2008	Beautiful People	Kathy	Guest role
2009 – 2010	Skins	Celia Jones	
2010 – 2011	PhoneShop	Shelley	
2012	The Revolting World of Stanley Brown	Amanda Brown	Recurring role
2012 – 2019	Cuckoo	Nina Morgan	
2013	Fresh Meat	Chris Nordstrom	
2014 – 2016	Hank Zipzer	Rosa Zipzer	Main role
2026	Hank Zipzer's Christmas Catastrophe	Rosa Zipzer	TV film
2017	The End of the F***ing World	Della	
2021	Motherland	Linda	1 episode
2021	Brassic	Liz Jones	
2022-	Am I Being Unreasonable?	Viv	
2022	The Flatshare	Gillian	
2022	Stuck	Joy	
2022	Everything I Know About Love	Joan	
2022	Prefect	Janice	
2023	The Power	Barbara Monke	Recurring role
2023	Culprits	Marian	2 episodes
2024	Death in Paradise	Eloise Mirie	
2025	Big Boys	Eileen	1 episode
2025	What It Feels Like for a Girl	Alison	2 episodes
2026	Things You Should Have Done	Claudia	

=== Film ===
Year	Title	Role	Notes
2023	Falling Into Place	Sara	
2024	Back to Black	Janis Winehouse	
2025	Lady	Becky	
