= Fifteen Minutes That Shook the World =

2009 film

Fifteen Minutes That Shook the World is a film written by Dave Kirby about Liverpool F.C.'s Champions League win in 2005 in Istanbul, known as "The miracle of Istanbul". It stars Neil Fitzmaurice as Rafa Benítez and has cameos by Steven Gerrard, Jamie Carragher and Dietmar Hamann. The film has been available on DVD since late 2009.

The film begins with a TV journalist investigating the events of the Champions League final. He eventually tracks down CCTV footage of the Liverpool dressing room at half time.

The film had its world premiere on 16 November 2009 at the Odeon Cinema in Liverpool. It was made to raise money for Jamie Carragher's "23 Foundation" which is a Merseyside-based children's charity, and the cast were all volunteers.

== Cast ==
- Andrew Schofield as a journalist
- Neil Fitzmaurice as Rafa Benítez
- Jamie Carragher as himself - Liverpool F.C. Player
- Steven Gerrard as himself - Liverpool F.C. Player
- Dietmar Hamann as himself - Liverpool F.C. Player
- Philly Carragher as himself
- Lindzi Germain as Gwladys
- Sean McKee as Bitter Blue
- Marc J. Morrison as Ratboy (as ...Marc Morrison)
- Sonny Spofforth as Ronaldo
- David Gisbourne as Vladimír Šmicer
- Michael Robinson as Milan Baroš
- Daniel Sanderson as Igor Bišćan
- Phil Connolly as Harry Kewell
- Tom Doolan as John Arne Riise
- Shawn "Spykatcha" John as Djibril Cissé
