= Mobile (TV series) =

British television drama series

- Genre: Thriller
- Created by: John Fay
- Starring: Neil Fitzmaurice; Keith Allen; Sunetra Sarker; Shaun Dooley; Russell Boulter; Michael J. Jackson; Jamie Draven; Julie Graham; Warren Brown; John Thomson; John McArdle; Michael Kitchen; Samantha Bond
- Composer: Colin Towns
- Country of origin: United Kingdom
- Original language: English
- No. of series: 1
- No. of episodes: 3

Production
- Executive producer: Kieran Roberts
- Producers: Gina Cronk; Josh Dynevor
- Production locations: Liverpool; Manchester; Wirksworth
- Running time: 90 minutes
- Production company: Granada Television

Original release
- Network: ITV
- Release: 19 March – 2 April 2007

Mobile is a British television drama series, broadcast over three episodes, each featuring part of an interweaving plot involving a fictional mobile phone operator and the adverse effect of mobile phone radiation to health. The series was first broadcast on 19 March 2007 on ITV. The series starred a number of well-known actors, including Jamie Draven, Neil Fitzmaurice, Keith Allen, Sunetra Sarker, Samantha Bond, Brittany Ashworth and Julie Graham. The three-part series was written and created by John Fay. The series was released on DVD on 9 April 2007, with a running time of 207 minutes. The US broadcast and release of the series, via Acorn Media, separates the series into four episodes of 50 minutes each, with the additional fourth episode being entitled "The Showdown".

== Plot ==
The series is set in Liverpool and Manchester, and the main action takes place in the present day, with a backstory of events surrounding the 2003 Iraq War. Alongside Liverpool and Manchester, the series was filmed in Wirksworth, Derbyshire, on the Ecclesbourne Valley Railway. Each of the three episodes focuses on a different individual caught up in the overall story. In episode one, Neil Fitzmaurice stars as Eddie Doig, a man diagnosed with an inoperable brain tumour. Blaming the long-term use of his mobile phone for his condition, he is persuaded by a hypnotist to mount a terror campaign against masts belonging to a fictitious mobile phone company. In episode two, Iraq War veteran and armed response officer Maurice Stoan (Jamie Draven) is also revealed as part of the campaign. A trained marksman, he shoots people using mobile phones, causing fear and panic among the public. In the last episode, James Corson (Keith Allen), who is having a relationship with Collette West (Brittany Ashworth), the CEO of the phone company, is kidnapped by Stoan, whose intention is to assassinate Corson. However, the series ends with a terrifying twist as the truth about those behind the terror campaign is revealed.

== Cast ==
- Neil Fitzmaurice as Eddie Doig
- Keith Allen as Sir James Corson
- Sunetra Sarker as DI Lorraine Conil
- Shaun Dooley as DI George Fleming
- Russell Boulter as DS John Goddard
- Phil Rowson as DS Charlie Lathom
- Michael J. Jackson as Supt Hewitt
- Jamie Draven as Maurice Stoan
- Brittany Ashworth as Collette West
- Frank Lauder as Bobby Dean
- Julie Graham as Donna Doig
- Warren Brown as Tommo Nobbs
- John Thomson as Ray Bould
- John McArdle as Paul Stoan
- Michael Kitchen as David West
- Samantha Bond as Rachel West

== Episodes ==
| No. | Title | Directed by | Written by | Original release date | Viewers (millions) |
|---|---|---|---|---|---|
| 1 | "The Engineer" | Stuart Orme | John Fay | 19 March 2007 | 5.77 |
Eddie Doig is dying of an inoperable brain tumour. He was let go by his former employer where he was a telecommunications engineer. Mobile phone towers have been brought down by explosions in two cities. A person on the phone while driving was shot. Passengers talking on mobiles on a train were killed. Eddie can't remember where he was or what he was doing at the time of these incidences. Is his amnesia a product of his tumour? Did he do what the police suspect him of doing?
| 2 | "The Soldier" | Stuart Orme | John Fay | 26 March 2007 | 5.30 |
Maurice Stoan was stationed in Iraq three years ago when his wife and infant son were killed by a hit and run driver. While he was home on leave, his unit was deployed without him and he was mustered out. Now, he is still looking for the person who killed his family. As a sharpshooter with the police, he is assigned to a squad covering Eddie Doig to keep him from blowing up a mobile tower on top of a hotel.
| 3 | "The Boss" | Stuart Orme | John Fay | 2 April 2007 | 5.08 |
Three years ago, Sir James Corson ruins the life and career of David West by seducing West's teenage daughter, Collette, in order to steal personal files, and then blackmailing West to resign as executive of Oxident. Sir James is also responsible for two other deaths. Now, David West is ready for revenge.
