= John Fay (writer) =

British television screenwriter and playwright

- Born: 1964 (age 61–62)
- Occupations: Screenwriter, playwright
- Writing career
- Genres: Drama, soap opera, science fiction
- Notable works: Brookside, Coronation Street, Torchwood, Mobile
- Notable awards: Best Continuing Drama; 2005 Coronation Street

John Fay is a British television screenwriter and playwright. He is known for his work on television soap operas Brookside and Coronation Street as well as his later work on original drama series like Torchwood.

== Career ==
=== Theatre writing ===
Fay began his writing career by writing and producing his own stage plays for local theatres around Liverpool, including several plays for Kirkby Response Theatre during the nineties. His later credits include the stage plays The Cruel Sea and Eat My Eyes. He has also written 'Joe Hill's Dream', based on the life of Joe Hill, the famous Swedish-American labour activist and songwriter.

=== Television ===
Fay began his television career on Brookside, although he states in an interview that it took him 16 years and several speculative scripts to get taken on to the writing staff full-time. He stayed on the creative team for two years, writing 54 episodes, before joining the writing staff of Coronation Street, writing 94 episodes and becoming lead writer. In 2005 he received the British Academy Television Award for Best Continuing Drama, sharing the BAFTA with Coronation Street producer Tony Wood and director Ian Bevitt. One of his notable scripts for Coronation Street was "Richard Hillman's murder confession" which attracted over 19 million viewers. Fay's other television contributions include episodes of Clocking Off, Blue Murder and Robin Hood. In 2007, Fay created the three-part ITV drama series Mobile. Fay is a self-confessed hater of mobile telephones and in Mobile chose to explore the themes of "people's paranoid desire to always be in contact with each other" and whether mobile phones are actually necessary.

Russell T Davies, having been an admirer of John Fay's work on Coronation Street and Mobile, approached Fay to write for the third series of Torchwood. Fay wrote two episodes of the award-winning third series of Torchwood, subtitled Children of Earth, which aired 7 and 9 July 2009. He returned to write the ninth episode of the shows' fourth series, Torchwood: Miracle Day a collaboration between BBC Wales, BBC Worldwide and US cable channel Starz. In 2011 he also wrote for the fourth series of Primeval. He was to write an episode of Doctor Who, but this fell through.

Fay has written two episodes of the Jimmy McGovern drama Moving On, Sauce for the Goose – the first episode of the second series, and an episode of the third series, airing Autumn 2011, which he also directed. He also contributed to the period drama Medici: Masters of Florence.

== Personal life ==
John Fay is originally from Merseyside, and is currently based in Maghull, to the north of Liverpool, where he lives with his wife. His father died shortly before he came to write Children of Earth, which Fay acknowledges when retroactively considering his views on the serial. He cites John Proctor from Arthur Miller's The Crucible as his favourite fictional character of all time, and Rhys Williams as his favourite Torchwood character.

== Selected credits ==
Production	Notes	Broadcaster
Brookside		Channel 4
Clocking Off	(2001–2003)	BBC One
Coronation Street	(2003–2007)	ITV
Blue Murder	Up in Smoke (2004); The Spartacus Thing (2006)	ITV
Mobile (2007)	Three Episodes	ITV
Robin Hood	Episode #2.9: Lardner's Ring (2007)	BBC One
Torchwood	Children of Earth: Day Two (2009); Children of Earth: Day Four (2009); Torchwood Miracle Day: The Gathering (2011)	BBC One
Primeval	Episode #4.5 (2011)	ITV
The Mill	Six episodes (2013-2014)	BBC One
Medici: Masters of Florence	Three episodes (2016)	Rai 1
