= The Javone Prince Show =

- Starring: Javone Prince
- Country of origin: United Kingdom

Original release
- Network: BBC
- Release: 2015

The Javone Prince Show is a 2015 variety/comedy sketch show, produced by BBC. The show stars British actor Javone Prince, best known for his role as Jerwayne in PhoneShop. In 2016, Prince was nominated for the British Academy Television Award for Best Male Comedy Performance for his work on the show.
