= Vincenzo Nicoli =

British actor

- Born: Worcester, England
- Citizenship: United Kingdom; Italy
- Education: London Academy of Music and Dramatic Art (LAMDA)
- Occupation: Actor
- Years active: 1980–present
- Known for: Alien³ as Alan Jude; Hank Zipzer as Peter "Papa Pete" Zipzer
- Television: The Odyssey as Antinous; EastEnders as Terry and Mad Dog; Mr Selfridge as Uncle Gio; Thomas & Friends as Lorenzo and Beppe
- Spouse: Heather Bleasdale
- Children: 1

Vincenzo Nicoli is a British actor who appears in film, television and theatre. He is best known for roles in blockbuster films, such as Alan Jude in the 1992 science fiction film Alien³ (1992), Enrico Biscaglia in the romantic drama film In Love and War (1996), Tony Genova in the 2016 short film The Naughty List (2016) and in the television programme Auf Wiedersehen, Pet as Sandro.

He is also known for his role as Papa Pete in the CBBC children's programme Hank Zipzer (2014–2016) and as the voices of Lorenzo and Beppe in Thomas & Friends (2019–2021). Along with actress Flaminia Cinque, he has appeared in Leap Year, The Knot, Brothers of Italy and Mama Cannelloni.

== Early life ==
Nicoli was born in Worcester to Italian parents originally from the region of Apulia.

He graduated from a three-year acting course at the London Academy of Music and Dramatic Art (LAMDA) in London.

== Career ==
He made his acting debut when he appeared in the musical Bashville and as a minor character in Accidental Death of an Anarchist.

His television appearances include Rome, Dalziel and Pascoe, Dempsey and Makepeace, The Young Indiana Jones Chronicles, Auf Wiedersehen, Pet, Mr. Selfridge, EastEnders and Foyle's War.

Nicoli appeared as Antinous in the 1997 miniseries The Odyssey for two episodes of the miniseries. From 2014 to 2016, he played Papa Pete in the comedy programme Hank Zipzer with American actor and creator of the series Henry Winkler, who plays Mr. Rock, the music teacher of the title character.

He played a crime boss in the Christopher Nolan superhero film The Dark Knight, featuring Christian Bale, Heath Ledger, Gary Oldman, Michael Caine and Morgan Freeman. He has appeared in films such as Captain Phillips (featuring Tom Hanks, Barkhad Abdi and Catherine Keener), Leap Year, Alien³ (with Sigourney Weaver), Buster, In Love and War (featuring Sandra Bullock and Chris O'Donnell) and The Naughty List.

Nicoli played the role of Jono in the 2014 critically acclaimed short film The Double Deal, which Mark Holden produced and starred in, after which Holden received four awards.

In 2019, he joined the voice cast of Thomas & Friends as the voices of Lorenzo and Beppe in the UK & US versions, respectively.

In 2020, Nicoli appeared as the mobster known as Vincenzo Murgida in the Father Brown episode, "The Folly of Jephthah", which aired on 10 January 2020. Nicoli's character Vincenzo Murgida is considered the most notorious Italian mobster who wants Hercule Flambeau (John Light) to choose his fate.

== Personal life ==
Nicoli is married to actress Heather Bleasdale. He has a daughter, Ella Nicoli-Horne, from a previous relationship, who studies at Bournemouth University. He speaks English and Italian. He upholds his British-Italian citizenship.

== Filmography ==
=== Film ===
Year	Title	Role	Notes
1988	Buster	Gang Members	
1992	Alien³	Alan Jude	
1992	The Ballad of Kid Divine: The Cockney Cowboy	Diablo	
1995	The Perfect Life	Dr. McCawley	
1996	In Love and War	Enrico Biscaglia	
2006	The Detonator	Yuri Mishalov	Direct-to-video
2006	Rabbit Fever	Italian Man	
2006	Sixty Six	Leo	
2007	Flight of Fury	Peter Stone	Direct-to-video
2007	Dangerous Parking	Greek Fisherman	
2008	The Journey Home	"Terry"	Short film
2008	Bathory: Countess of Blood	Zsigmond Bathory	
2008	The Dark Knight	Crime Boss	
2010	Leap Year	Stefano	
2010	Rojin	Man in Suit	Short film
2010	Papa	Edwardo	Short film
2011	National Theatre Live: The Kitchen	Alfredo	
2011	Will	Broker	
2012	The Knot	Mr. Fernandez	
2013	Spiders 3D	Caz	
2013	Captain Phillips	Andrew Brezinski	
2014	The Double Deal	Jono	Short film
2016	The Naughty List	Tony Genova	
2016	Slugterra: Mark of the Streaker Slug	Sa'mul (voice)	Direct-to-video
2018	Artichoke	Massimo, The Boss	
2018	Brothers of Italy	Giuseppe Petrucco	Short film
2019	Thomas & Friends: Digs and Discoveries	Lorenzo, Beppe, Workers, Passenger (voices)	UK/US version
2019	Holy Cannelloni	Papa Tony	Short film
2020	Artemis Fowl	Goblin Sergeant	

=== Television ===
Year	Title	Role	Notes
1983	The Accidental Death of an Anarchist	Policeman	Television movie
1984	On the Shelf	Vincenzo	Television movie
1985	Blue Money	Second Colombian	Television movie
1985	Up the Elephant and Round the Castle	Lumps	Episode: "One in the Rough"
1986	Auf Wiedersehen, Pet	Sandro	Episode: "Marjorie Doesn't Live Here Anymore"
1986	The Kit Curran Radio Show	Robber	Episode: "The Street of Shame"; Titled as Kit Curran in the second season
1986	The Return of Sherlock Holmes	Pietro Venucci	Episode: "The Six Napoleons"
1986	Mixed Doubles	Pat	Episode: "It's in the Book"
1986	Dempsey and Makepeace	Colombian	Episode: "The Cortez Connection"
1986	Call Me Mister	Dave	Episode: "The Carve Up"
1987	Truckers	Mafioso	Episodes: "Stinking Fish" and "The Heat of the Moment"
1987	1914 All Out	Stapleton	Television movie
1987	Boon	Vito Rossi	Episode: "Paper Mafia"
1987–2011	EastEnders	Terry / Mad Dog	3 episodes
1988	Hannay	Gypsy	Episode: "Death with Due Notice"
1988	Wish Me Luck	Maurice Granier	5 episodes
1988	Home James!	Bouncer	Episode: "A Sheep's Eye for an Eye"
1989	Blind Justice	Italian	Episode: "Crime and Punishment"
1989	Me and My Girl	Geordie	Episode: "A Bit of Overtime"
1989	Making Out	Nico	2 episodes
1989	Flying Lady	Rambo Hawkshaw	Episode: "The Match"
1989	Made in Spain	Johnie	Television movie
1989	Hit the Pitch	Michael	Television movie
1990	The Ruth Rendell Mysteries	John Fassbender	Episode: "Put on by Cunning"
1991	Very Big Very Soon	Georgio	Episode: "Double Dealing"
1992	Zorro	Jorge Santiago	Episode: "Mendoza the Malevolent"
1993	The Young Indiana Jones Chronicles	Kazim	Episode: "Palestine, October 1917"
1994	Frank Stubbs Promotes	Suggett	Episode: "Chinatown"
1995	Joseph	Simeon	Television movie
1995	Fist of Fun		Episode: "#1.4"
1995	Shine on Harvey Moon	Azzopardi	3 episodes
1996	The Vet	Bruno Pirroda	Episode: "A Fresh Start"
1997	The Odyssey	Antinous	Television miniseries Episodes: "Part I" and "Part II"
1997	Dalziel and Pascoe	Dave Lee	Episode: "A Killing Kindness"
1998	The Bill	Paul Kane	Episode: "Watching the Detectives"
1999	Grange Hill	Mr. Savi	2 episodes
1999	Boyz Unlimited	Mick McNamara	4 episodes
2002	Black Books	Frederick	Episode: "Blood"
2003	Twelfth Night, or What You Will	Fabian	Television movie
2004	Gory Greek Gods	Poseidon	Television movie
2005	Judge John Deed	DS Rex Massey	Episode: "Lost and Found"
2005	Rome	Lysandros	Episode: "Pharsalus"
2005	Ten Days to Victory	Colonel Valerio	Television documentary movie
2006	Suburban Shootout	Emile Lesoux	4 episodes
2008	The Royal	Tony Dannini	Episode: "To Love and to Lose"
2009	Henry VIII: Mind of a Tyrant	Venetian Ambassador	Episode: "Warrior 1509–1525"
2010	Holby City	Lloyd Fisher	Episode: "The Short Straw"
2013	Run	Zak	Episode: "Richard"; Television miniseries
2013	The Prey	Antonio Fazio	Television miniseries Episode: "Mergers and Acquisitions"
2014–2016	Hank Zipzer	Peter "Papa Pete" Zipzer	Main cast 26 episodes
2014	Mr. Selfridge	Uncle Gio	3 episodes
2015	Foyle's War	Grant	Episode: "High Castle"
2016	The Coroner	Tam Bryant	Episode: "The Captain's Pipe"
2016	I Want My Wife Back	M'aitre D	Episode: "Chapter Four"
2016	Hank Zipzer's Christmas Catastrophe	Papa Pete	Television movie
2019	Urban Myths	Alberto Vitale	Episode: "The Trial of Joan Collins"
2019–2021	Thomas & Friends	Lorenzo, Beppe (voices)	UK/US versions
2020	Father Brown	Vincenzo Murgida	Episode: "The Folly of Jephthah"
2020	Housebound	Giuseppe	6 episodes
2020	Roadkill	George	Episode: "#1.3"; Television miniseries

=== Video games ===
Year	Title	Role	Notes
2020	Zombie Army 4: Dead War	Additional Voices (voice)	

=== Stage ===
Year	Title	Role	Notes
1983	Bashville	Performer	
2003	Things You Shouldn't Say Past Midnight	Gene	
2011	The Kitchen	Alfredo	
2012	The Revenger's Tragedy	The Duke	
2013	The Shawshank Redemption	Bogs Diamond	
2014	The Merchant of Venice	Duke Of Venice / Prince of Arragon	

=== Radio ===
Year	Title	Role	Notes
2020	Doctor Who: Cry of the Vultriss	Pagus	
2020	Assets of War	Vibax	
