= Angelo's =

- Genre: Sitcom
- Created by: Sharon Horgan
- Written by: Sharon Horgan
- Directed by: Chloe Thomas
- Starring: Steve Brody; Shelley Longworth; Alice Lowe; Sharon Horgan; Paul Garner; Simon Farnaby; Miranda Hart; Javone Prince
- Country of origin: United Kingdom
- Original language: English
- No. of series: 1
- No. of episodes: 6

Production
- Executive producer: Iain Morris
- Producer: Damon Beesley
- Production company: Bwark Productions

Original release
- Network: Five
- Release: 16 November – 21 December 2007

Angelo's is a British sitcom that aired on Five in 2007. One series of six episodes was produced. It was written by Sharon Horgan who was also a member of ensemble cast. Steve Brody starred in the title role as the proprietor of London cafe Angelo's. Also starring was Shelley Longworth as Maria, Angelo's daughter, Alice Lowe, Miranda Hart and Javone Prince. Paul Kaye and Belinda Stewart-Wilson guest starred. Horgan claimed that before the show aired, they discovered that Five had decided not to fund any more original comedy, effectively cancelling the show.
