= Cashel Byron's Profession =

Book by George Bernard Shaw

Cover of the first edition, 1886.

Cashel Byron's Profession is George Bernard Shaw's fourth novel. The novel was written in 1882 and after rejection by several publishers it was published in serialized form in To-Day: Monthly Magazine of Scientific Socialism in 1885 and 1886. The novel was later published as a book in England and the United States. Shaw wrote five novels early in his career and then abandoned them to pursue politics, drama criticism and eventually play writing. The Admirable Bashville (1901), a short play based loosely on this novel, was written to protect American copyrights after the novel became unexpectedly successful in the United States.

== Synopsis ==
=== Preface ===
In Shaw's preface "Novels of my Nonage", written in 1901, he disparages his early work, including Cashel Byron's Profession: "...people will admire [the author] for the feats any fool can achieve, and bear malice against him for boring them with better work." He also resurrects a heavily edited Robert Louis Stevenson quote used to promote the book. The full text of the quote breaks down the story into parts, including one part “blooming gaseous folly”.

=== Novel ===
The novel follows Cashel Byron, a world champion prizefighter, as he tries to woo wealthy aristocrat Lydia Carew without revealing his illegal profession.

Lydia is portrayed as a moral and intelligent woman (although "priggish" according to Shaw) and is constantly contrasted with the "ruffian" Cashel. Lydia was advised by her recently deceased father to find a husband with a profession, as opposed to an idle gentleman or an art critic like her father.

Cashel’s childhood ends when he runs away from school to Australia and becomes apprentice to an ex-world champion boxer. When Cashel goes to England to secure his world title in that country he meets Lydia at her country manor. After much miscommunication and drawing room comedy, Cashel gives up boxing and succeeds in marrying Lydia. As in his postscript to "Pygmalion" (1912), in which he describes Eliza Doolittle's future life, Shaw chose to portray the Byron marriage in a realistic manner and narrates how Lydia comes to regard Cashel as "one of the children".

=== Postscript ===
According to "Note on Modern Prizefighting" (1901) Shaw intended the fights described in Cashel Byron's Profession to turn the public away from the sport but the novel is written in such a light-hearted tone this unlikely result never materialized.

== Adaptations ==
The British musical Bashville, first performed in 1983, was adapted from the play The Admirable Bashville.

== Reception ==
Robert Louis Stevenson wrote in a letter to William Archer:

What am I to say? I have read your friend’s book with singular relish. If he has written any other, I beg you will let me see it; and if he has not, I beg him to lose no time in supplying the deficiency. It is full of promise; but I should like to know his age. There are things in it that are very clever, to which I attach small importance; it is the shape of the age. And there are passages, particularly the rally in presence of the Zulu king, that show genuine and remarkable narrative talent—a talent that few will have the wit to understand, a talent of strength, spirit, capacity, sufficient vision, and sufficient self-sacrifice, which last is the chief point in a narrator.

As a whole, it is (of course) a fever dream of the most feverish. Over Bashville the footman I howled with derision and delight; I dote on Bashville—I could read of him for ever; de Bashville je suis le fervent—there is only one Bashville, and I am his devoted slave; Bashville est magnifique, mais il n’est guère possible. He is the note of the book. It is all mad, mad and deliriously delightful; the author has a taste in chivalry like Walter Scott’s or Dumas’, and then he daubs in little bits of socialism; he soars away on the wings of the romantic griffon—even the griffon, as he cleaves air, shouting with laughter at the nature of the quest—and I believe in his heart he thinks he is labouring in a quarry of solid granite realism.
