= Matt Bloom (director) =

British film and television director

Matt Bloom is an Emmy winning and BAFTA-nominated British director of television, commercials and short films, and a graduate of the International Film School Wales.

He directed consecutive new hit shows as lead director: The BAFTA-winning 4 O'Clock Club, All at Sea, Hank Zipzer starring Henry Winkler, The Lodge for Disney Channel, and Find Me in Paris for ZDF.

He was mentored by Moulin Rouge! and Romeo + Juliet director Baz Luhrmann, with whom he made a short film in Manchester starring Brenda Blethyn and Emma Bunton.

His award-winning short film Small Things starred Stirling Gallacher (The Office, Little Britain) and Joe Absolom (EastEnders, Vincent). He has recently directed commercials and virals for The Co-operative Group and BBC Comedy, and his latest short horror film, Endless starring Chris Geere and Jenna Harrison, which won the Best Horror/Sci-Fi award at the London Independent Film Festival.

He directed the Arctic-themed music video "Cold Feet" for Liam Finn.

== Director ==
- Theodosia (TV series) – BBC Series 2 (director, 10 episodes 2023)
- Theodosia (TV series) – BBC Series 1 (director, 9 episodes 2022)
- Find Me in Paris – Disney Plus Series 3 (lead director, 13 episodes 2021)
- Find Me in Paris – Disney Plus Series 2 (lead director, 13 episodes 2021)
- Find Me in Paris – Disney Plus Series 1 (lead director, 13 episodes 2020)
- Hank Zipzer's Christmas Catastrophe – BBC, Christmas Movie (2017)
- The Lodge – Disney Channel (lead director, 5 episodes 2016)
- Hank Zipzer – BBC, Series 3 (lead director, 7 episodes, 2016)
- Hank Zipzer – BBC, Series 2 (lead director, 6 episodes, 2015)
- Hank Zipzer – BBC, Series 1 (lead director, 6 episodes, 2014)
- All at Sea – BBC, Series 1 (lead director, 4 episodes, 2013–2014)
- 4 O'Clock Club – BBC, Series 2 (lead director, 8 episodes, 2012–2013)
- 4 O'Clock Club – BBC, Series 1 (lead director, 4 episodes, 2012)
- Liam Finn "Cold Feet" (music video)
- Endless (short horror film)
- Jinx – BBC (6 episodes)
- The Bill – ITV (6 episodes)
- Small Things (short film)
- Comedy Lab – Channel 4/E4 (1 episode)
- Doctors – BBC (14 episodes)
