= Bashville =

British musical adapted from George Bernard Shaw play

Bashville is a British musical adapted by David William and Benny Green from George Bernard Shaw's play The Admirable Bashville, with music by Denis King and lyrics by Benny Green. It was originally produced at the Regent's Park Open Air Theatre.

Bashville was nominated for Best New Musical at the 1983 Olivier Awards.
