= Blue Murder (British TV series) =

British television crime drama series (2003–2009)

- Genre: Crime drama
- Created by: Cath Staincliffe
- Starring: Caroline Quentin; Ian Kelsey; Paul Loughran; Nicholas Murchie; Saskia Wickham; Rhea Bailey; Belinda Everett
- Theme music composer: Kevin Sargeant
- Country of origin: United Kingdom
- Original language: English
- No. of series: 5
- No. of episodes: 19

Production
- Running time: 90 minutes (series 1–4); 60 minutes (series 5)
- Production company: ITV Studios

Original release
- Network: ITV
- Release: 18 May 2003 – 12 October 2009

Blue Murder is a British crime drama television series based in Manchester, originally broadcast on ITV from 18 May 2003 until 12 October 2009, starring Caroline Quentin as DCI Janine Lewis and Ian Kelsey as DI Richard Mayne. Five series of the programme were broadcast over the course of six years. Repeats have aired on ITV3.

== Background ==
Blue Murder centres on a single mother of four, DCI Janine Lewis (Caroline Quentin), trying to balance a demanding career with raising her young family, while constantly battling with her former husband, who has since started a new family of his own.

The series was created by Cath Staincliffe, a novelist and radio playwright. Staincliffe pitched the idea for Blue Murder to ITV and a two-part first series was commissioned by the network. The first series began broadcasting on 18 May 2003. Due to strong ratings, a second series of four episodes was subsequently commissioned and began broadcasting in 2004. Staincliffe was principal writer for the first two series, with John Fay, Jeff Povey and Matthew Hall also contributing scripts for the second series.

The fifth and final series debuted on 7 September 2009. The series was regarded by the cast as the best series yet, and Quentin described the series as having "finally cracked it". The final series included a number of guest stars Mark Benton, Lee Boardman, Kieran O'Brien, Brendan Coyle, Heather Peace, Tina O'Brien, Sylvia Syms and Anthony Flanagan.

== Cast ==
- Caroline Quentin as DCI Janine Lewis
- Ian Kelsey as DI Richard Mayne
- Nicholas Murchie as DS Tony Shap
- Paul Loughran as DS Ian Butchers
- Rhea Bailey as DC Lisa Goodall (season 3–4)
- Belinda Everett as DC Kat Skerton (season 5)
- David Schofield as DCS James Hackett (season 1–2)
- Saskia Wickham as DCS Louise Hogg (season 3–5)
- Ceallach Spellman as Tom Lewis
- Catherine Jenkins as Eleanor Lewis (season 1–2)
- Eden Garrity as Ellie Lewis (season 3–5)
- Joe Tucker as Pete Lewis (season 1–4)
- Geoff Breton as Michael Lewis
- Lucinda Raikes as Alison Aspen (season 5, Episode 2)
- Geoff Morrell as Les Knox (1 episode)

== Series overview ==
Series	Episodes	Originally released		DVD release (Region 2)	DVD release (Region 1)
Series	Episodes	First released	Last released	DVD release (Region 2)	DVD release (Region 1)
1	2	18 May 2003	19 May 2003	18 October 2004	12 June 2007
2	4	6 September 2004	27 September 2004	18 October 2004	12 June 2007
3	4	20 October 2006	10 November 2006	20 November 2006	29 January 2008
4	3	3 December 2007	17 December 2007	7 January 2008	12 August 2008
5	6	7 September 2009	12 October 2009	19 October 2009	30 June 2009

== Episode list ==
=== Series 1 (2003) ===
Blue Murder began as two 90-minute (advertisements included) episodes first shown in May 2003, which gained enough viewers for a full series. This two-part pilot later became known as series one and released as such on DVD in the UK.

No. overall	No. in series	Title	Directed by	Written by	Original release date	Viewers (millions)
1	1	"Cry Me a River: Part 1"	Paul Wroblewski	Cath Staincliffe	18 May 2003	8.90
Recently promoted pregnant DCI Janine Lewis is tasked with investigating the murder of a deputy headmaster found disemboweled on his allotment. A witness comes forward and manages to identify local youth Dean Hendricks, whom he saw running from the scene shortly before the victim was found. However, Janine isn't convinced of his guilt, and still has her eye on a former pupil with whom the victim had previously battled, and the victim's wife, whose account of her movements on the morning of the murder are somewhat shaky. Meanwhile, back at home, DCI Lewis struggles to cope at home following the departure of her ex-husband, Pete, and is forced to employ a nanny to look after the children whilst she is at work. DI Mayne continues to offer his support, with DCI Lewis unaware of his real feelings.
2	2	"Cry Me a River: Part 2"	Paul Wroblewski	Cath Staincliffe	19 May 2003	8.72
DCI Lewis' suspicions of the victim's wife increase when they find her burning a number of videotapes in her back garden. The team soon discover that the victim was running an underground porn ring, involving the headmaster of his school and his wife being forced to engage in violent sexual acts while being filmed. As Dean Hendricks finally surfaces, he claims that on the day of the murder, he was visiting the victim to provide him with his latest completed movie, but that the victim was already dead when he arrived. As Janine discovers clothing belonging to the victim's wife at the local mortuary, she realises it is just a matter of time before she has enough evidence to close the case and charge her suspect.

=== Series 2 (2004) ===
No. overall	No. in series	Title	Directed by	Written by	Original release date	Viewers (millions)
3	1	"Hit and Run"	Pip Broughton	Cath Staincliffe	6 September 2004	7.39
DCI Lewis heads up the investigation when the mutilated body of a lap dancer is recovered from the local river. Meanwhile, a young girl is knocked down and critically injured outside her school playground. When the car is discovered burnt out on nearby wasteground, forensics reveal it was the car used to transport the body of the river victim. One of the men suspected of driving the car is then found shot dead in an underpass. It's not long before the team's prime suspect turns out to be a man whom they have already heavily interrogated, who has fooled them all by disguising his identity, but it soon becomes a race against time to prevent him from boarding the next plane back to Poland.
4	2	"Fragile Relations"	Pip Broughton	Matthew Hall	13 September 2004	6.31
DCI Lewis investigates when a well-respected mullah is killed in an arson attack on his home. Suspicion immediately falls on the local representative of the far-right One Britain party, and it isn't long before evidence linking him to the murder is discovered. However, an allegation made by the suspect, claiming he was tipped off about his arrest by an Asian man shortly before he was taken in custody, leaves Janine convinced of his innocence, and further investigations raise the alarming possibility that the real culprit could be lurking within the Muslim community. When Janine discovers the victim had secretly married, a new prime suspect and motive for the killing suddenly comes to light.
5	3	"Up In Smoke"	Alex Pillai	John Fay	20 September 2004	7.57
DCI Lewis heads the investigation when the secretary of the local crematorium comes to her with suspicions that two bodies have been cremated in the same cremation. With crematorium boss Dave Moran and employee John Wheeler both missing, Janine has to work out which of them was the killer - and which of them has ended up in the ashes of the bosses' dead wife, Charlotte. As a tangled web of affairs and jealousy comes to light, crematorium owner Frank Evans is found dead inside the coffin of an elderly widow, whose body is now missing. As Janine and the team try to work out who the killer is, a witness provides some vital evidence which could lead to the discovery of a motive.
6	4	"Lonely"	Alex Pillai	Jeff Povey	27 September 2004	6.62
DCI Lewis leads the team as they grapple with the case of a childminder who was stabbed to death in her own flat. The only witness to the crime was a twelve-year old boy named Fergus, who is autistic and is unable to communicate with anyone. With a string of affairs and complicated relationships behind her, the list of suspects soon grows to include her creepy landlord, her ex-husband whom she left after he became violent, and the father of the young boy, whom she was supposedly romancing. However, Hackett isn't convinced of the involvement of any of the given suspects, and asks Janine to investigate the possibility that her killer may be somebody she met through speed dating.

=== Series 3 (2006) ===
Roy Mitchell also contributed to the script for episode one, "Steady Eddie".

No. overall	No. in series	Title	Directed by	Written by	Original release date	Viewers (millions)
7	1	"Steady Eddie"	Suri Krishnamma	Jeff Povey	20 October 2006	6.85
DCI Lewis and DI Mayne investigate a jewellery robbery, following which, the getaway car mowed down and killed a 14-year-old girl on her way home from her boyfriend's house, before crashing into a building site. Meanwhile, Janine catches up with an old friend, PC Eddie Carter, whom she knew from her training days at Hendon. When the driver of the car is discharged from hospital, Janine asks Eddie to accompany him into custody, but en route, Eddie is shot and killed along with the suspect. Forensics later reveal that Eddie was the intended target of the shooting, leaving the team baffled as to why anyone would have wanted to kill a long-serving officer with a clean record.
8	2	"Make Believe"	Menhaj Huda	Cath Staincliffe	27 October 2006	7.03
DCI Lewis leads the investigation into the disappearance of a three-year-old boy, Sammy Wray, who was taken from his local play park. When a local builder finds the body of a young child in a drainage tunnel, Janine informs the boy's grieving parents - but it's not long before the boy's father comes under suspicion after his alibi turns shaky. Janine also suspects that the man's ex-wife and daughter may have played a part in the boy's disappearance - until DNA reveals that the body is not that of Sammy Ray. Janine subsequently discovers a tragic case of misfortune when it transpires that one of the builders from the contracting firm may be hiding a very deadly secret from his wife.
9	3	"The Spartacus Thing"	Suri Krishnamma	John Fay	3 November 2006	6.24
DCI Lewis investigates when a man recently released from prison for the murder of his wife is found strangled with a dog chain in an identical manner to the way that she was killed. When the father of the deceased claims that he murdered his son-in-law out of revenge, it appears to be an open and shut case - until several of the man's relatives individually confess to the crime. As Janine and the team attempt to work out who could and couldn't be responsible, the only relative who did not confess to the crime is found dead in his bathroom following a brutal attack. Shap puts his career on the line when he leaks privileged information to the suspect in an attempt to get him to talk.
10	4	"In Deep"	Menhaj Huda	Colin MacDonald	10 November 2006	6.27
DCI Lewis tasks the team with uncovering the identity of a dead body found at the bottom of a local lake. On the corpse was an engraved hip flask belonging to successful architect Paul Cochran, who now resides in a local institution following a battle with drugs and depression. As the team discover the body to be that of Mickey Day, a local lout who disappeared after taunting a group of fisherman, they discover that one member of the fishing group has vanished off the radar completely. When Cochran and another member of the group turn up dead, the police suspect that the missing comrade may have disguised his identity in order to commit the three murders.

=== Series 4 (2007) ===
No. overall	No. in series	Title	Directed by	Written by	Original release date	Viewers (millions)
11	1	"Not a Matter of Life and Death"	Graham Theakston	Neil Jones	3 December 2007	7.24
DCI Lewis brings a night out on the tiles with the team to halt when a young boy is found stabbed in the street. When the boy subsequently dies of his injuries, the team find themselves investigating why anyone would want to kill a seemingly harmless young footballer with a promising career ahead of him. However, when a screaming woman turns up on the boy's doorstep claiming to be his girlfriend, an entire double life, including a car, apartment, drugs habit and even a rape are revealed. But would the boy really want to risk his career? Meanwhile, Janine notices that Richard hasn't been on the ball lately, and tries to plug him to find out what has been keeping his mind elsewhere.
12	2	"Desperate Measures"	Graham Theakston	Cath Staincliffe	10 December 2007	6.71
DCI Lewis investigates the death of a family doctor, Dr. Halliwell, who was fatally shot as he left his practice following afternoon surgery. Janine initially suspects that a campaign of abuse may be being directed towards the surgery when one of his colleagues subsequently disappears, but soon discovers the shooting is much more personal. When the team find the former owner of the gun whom they suspect may be involved, Lisa makes a grave error which could result in the suspect escaping prosecution. As a tangled web of revelations involving Dr. Halliwell's personal and professional life come to light, the team have varying opinions as to who could be responsible for the attack.
13	3	"Crisis Management"	Juliet May	Elizabeth-Anne Whea	17 December 2007	6.60
DCI Lewis and DI Mayne are called in when a sergeant is found brutally assaulted and murdered at an army barracks, where they uncover resentments and inappropriate relationships within the camp. DCI Lewis, meanwhile, is charmed by a major with the Special Investigation Branch, Tim Fairhead, who sought her out to aid the investigation. As their romance begins to blossom, it falls to DI Mayne to ensure her private and professional lives do not become too entangled. As further revelations begin to come to light, an arson and a showdown in the army mess hall begin to suggest an identity for the killer. But just as the team get close to cracking the case, tragedy strikes.

=== Series 5 (2009) ===
Beginning with this series, the format changed from 90-minute episodes to 60-minute episodes.

No. overall	No. in series	Title	Directed by	Written by	Original release date	Viewers (millions)
14	1	"Having it All"	David Drury	Steve Griffiths	7 September 2009	5.42
When a cheerleading coach is found brutally murdered in her garage the night after a major league competition, suspicion soon falls on her husband, whose bloodied clothes are found near the crime scene - but further investigation by DCI Lewis and the team uncovers a bitter family rivalry and a shocking affair, which suggests someone else may have had a motive for murder. .
15	2	"Inside"	Susan Tully	Neil Jones	14 September 2009	4.83
DI Mayne goes undercover as a prisoner to investigate the suspicious death of an inmate in the prison washroom who had been awaiting the outcome of an appeal against a murder conviction. He soon discovers that several inmates have a connection with the original murder victim. Meanwhile, DCI Lewis finds herself embroiled in a personal crisis when her son Michael causes a car crash that leaves another driver seriously injured, and he is subsequently arrested on suspicion of dangerous driving. As DI Mayne's investigation begins to gather momentum, he finds his own personal safety becoming compromised as he continues to search for the truth.
16	3	"Tooth and Claw"	Susan Tully	Cath Staincliffe	21 September 2009	5.35
DCI Lewis and DI Mayne investigate the murder of a popular vet, Ruth Turner, in the hills north of Manchester. As they attempt to integrate with a farming community which is reluctant to open its doors to outsiders, they discover a link to a series of local arson attacks, and a secret girlfriend that Ruth had been having an affair with. Meanwhile, DI Mayne takes DS Butchers' appraisal and informs him that he needs to start thinking about his general health and fitness. Butchers' motivation to get started leads him and DS Shap back to the hills, where he comes across vital clues on a farm, which begin to point Janine and Richard in the right direction of the killer.
17	4	"This Charming Man"	David Drury	Sue Odout	28 September 2009	4.96
Jack Taylor, the charismatic young singer of a local band, Rule 7, is found dead in his apartment. DCI Lewis and DI Mayne soon discover that Jack had a fractious relationship with just about everyone he came into contact with, including his brother, Sam, and his on-off girlfriend Amy. The band's manager, Matt Ferrer, had doubts about their new album and DS Butchers discovers that he is trying to get an ex-member back on board. But as another secret relationship comes to light, CCTV evidence proves that Jack's brother was not where he claimed to be that night. The case also brings DCI Lewis into conflict with Ellie, who is a massive fan of the band.
18	5	"Private Sins (Part 1)"	Juliet May	Elizabeth-Anne Wheal	5 October 2009	5.07
DCI Lewis and the team are called away from a police function to investigate the death of a private investigator, Peter Williams, who is found on the roof of a multi-storey car park, stabbed in the neck. During a search of his flat, Shap conceals a post-it note with the name "Camerton" written on it. As DCI Lewis and DI Mayne interview Williams' boss, they discover that one of his colleagues, Tanya Lewis, may have information surrounding his death. When Shap later catches up with Tanya, he convinces her to find "Camerton" in return for immunity from prosecution. Tanya is sent into witness protection, but it isn't long before the killer tracks her down.
19	6	"Private Sins (Part 2)"	Juliet May	Elizabeth-Anne Wheal	12 October 2009	5.15
DI Mayne is forced to confront DS Shap as his behaviour becomes increasingly erratic, and he reveals that he had intimate relations with Tanya shortly before she was murdered. As he puts his career at risk to save Shap from humiliation, Mayne also tries to help DCI Lewis, who is forced to take time off work to confront her son's truancy. With the revelation that Tanya was pursuing Camerton shortly before she was found dead, the investigation goes up a gear in pursuit of the real killer. As Shap fights to clear his name, he is forced to reveal that he is Camerton's secret older brother - leading the team to discover that he was innocent of the crime he was imprisoned for.
