= Emily Benet =

British novelist

Emily Benet is a British-Spanish author.

== Early life ==
Benet was born to a Spanish father and a Welsh mother and raised in South London until age 13. She then spent her teen years in Barcelona.

== Writing career ==
Benet has written three notable books, Shopgirl Diaries, Spray Painted Bananas, and "#PleaseRetweet". Spray Painted Bananas was republished in September 2014 by Harper Impulse, an imprint of HarperCollins and renamed the Temp. #PleaseRetweet is her latest book, published in August 2015.

She lists herself as a Wattpad sensation after her book received over one million hits, which led to her signing with a literary agent: MBA. She has a two-book deal with Harper Impulse.

=== ShopGirl Diaries ===
Her debut novel, Shopgirl diaries, began as a blog about working in her parents' chandelier shop and was commissioned as a book by Salt Publishing. It was also made into a short film starring Blake Harrison from the Inbetweeners, Katy Wix and Annette Badland. The short film was selected for The London Short Film Festival in January 2014.
