= Cheryl Taylor =

Television executive

Cheryl Francis Taylor (born March 1964) is the Controller of CBBC in Salford.

== Early life ==
She was brought up in Liverpool in a family of Quakers. She went to the independent boarding school The Mount School, York, where she became Head Girl. York was known for its Quaker heritage, which largely centred around the famous chocolate factories. She studied Drama at the University of Bristol.

== Career ==
=== CITV ===
She was first appointed Head of ITV’s Children’s input as the Controller of children’s and youth programmes, with also holding responsibilities of the schedhule, website and channel from 2000 to 2006 of CITV, taking over from Nigel Pickard.

=== Hat Trick Productions ===
She was Head of Comedy at Hat Trick Productions. With Carmel Morgan, she co-created Drop Dead Gorgeous for BBC Three.

=== CBBC ===
On 29 June 2012 it was announced that she would be the next Controller of CBBC. She began in September 2012. On 21 December 2012, children's teatime programming on BBC One finished.

== Personal life ==
She lives near Hebden Bridge in West Yorkshire.

Media offices
Preceded by Damian Kavanagh	Controller of CBBC; September 2012 -	Succeeded by Incumbent
