= Hank Zipzer =

Series of children's books by Henry Winkler and Lin Oliver

Hank Zipzer: The World's Greatest Underachiever
- Author: Henry Winkler; Lin Oliver
- Original title: Hank Zipzer: The Mostly True Confessions of the World's Best Underachiever
- Country: United States
- Language: English
- Discipline: Children's Literature
- Publisher: Grosset & Dunlap
- Published: January 1, 2003-April 20, 2010
- No. of books: 17
- Followed by: Here's Hank (2014-2019); Hank Zipzer (TV series) (2014-2016 on CBBC channel)

The Hank Zipzer: The World's Greatest Underachiever (Note: Hank Zipzer: The Mostly True Confessions of the World's Best Underachiever in Books 1–3 and Hank Zipzer: The World's Best Underachiever in Book 4.) series of fictional American children's books (2003–2010) by actor Henry Winkler and writer Lin Oliver, tells the story of a dyslexic child, Hank Zipzer. The series is based on Winkler's difficulties with school as a child, and it is set in his childhood home. After finishing the main series, Winkler and Oliver created a prequel called Here's Hank. This series explores Hank's life as a second grader (2014 to 2019). In addition, Winkler and Oliver created a television series (and Christmas film) called Hank Zipzer that ran from January 2014 to December 2016 on the CBBC channel. HBO Max began streaming all three seasons of Hank Zipzer in May 2022 and Hank Zipzer's Christmas Catastrophe in December 2022.

== Overview ==
Hank Zipzer is a young boy who is dyslexic. He lives on the Upper West Side of Manhattan with his family, and attends P.S. 87 at Amsterdam Avenue and W 78th Street. His best friends are Frankie Townsend and Ashley Wong.

== Major characters ==
Name	Bio
Henry "Hank" Daniel Zipzer	The main character who has learning challenges (dyslexia).
Frankie Townsend	One of Hank's best friends who is African-American, thinks oxygen is power, and has a nickname for everyone.
Ashley Wong	Hank's other best friend who is Chinese-American, a great athlete, and loves rhinestones.
Nick "The Tick" McKelty	The class bully who is none-too-bright.
Fanny Adolf	Hank's teacher and Deputy Headmistress who hates fun and funny. She always wears grey clothes, possibly to match her face.
Leland Love	Hank's principal who repeats everything twice and likes to answer his own questions. He has an ugly mole shaped like the Statue of Liberty without the torch.
Mr. Gristediano	The friend that give him an idea to Hank's parents about changing his type of learning.
Robert Upchurch	A 4th (formerly 3rd) grade genius who lives in the same building as Hank and blurts out information at random moments.
Papa Pete	Hank's grandfather who is always taking the kids somewhere and pinching his grandkids.
Carlos	The counter guy at Hank's mom's deli, the Crunchy Pickle.
Emily Grace Zipzer	Hank's younger sister, very smart when it comes to reptiles, considerably annoying, likes Robert Upchurch, and has a pet iguana named Katherine.
Randi Zipzer	Hank's mother, runs the Crunchy Pickle Deli, and takes healthy foods to a disgusting new level. Her name is Rosa in the TV series.
Stanley Zipzer	Hank's father, who is obsessed with crossword puzzles.
Cheerio Zipzer	Hank's dachshund, who looks like a Cheerio when he runs in circles.
Katherine Zipzer	Emily's iguana, who slurps food from the dinner table.
Vlady	The other counter guy at His mother's deli, the Crunchy Pickle.
Mr. Rock	Hank's music teacher who is Hank's favorite teacher.
Mason Harris Jerome Dunn	Hank's friend who is in kindergarten.
Heather Payne	A very tall, smart girl who tutored Hank in Math.
Sam Chin	Hank's other kindergarten friend who plays ping-pong with him.
Luke Whitman	A boy in Hank's class who is very gross, and always has his finger in his nose picking boogers.
Dr. Lynn Berger	Hank's dyslexia teacher, who is very nice and always encourages Hank.
Mrs. Fink	Hank's next-door neighbor who has a crush on Papa Pete and is always baking something for him.
Joelle Atkins	Nick's girlfriend that is obsessed with her phone.
Zoe McKelty	Hank's girlfriend, also Nick McKelty's cousin.
Collin Sebastian Rich IV	Hank's friend in The Night I Flunked My Field Trip. He bites his nails, he only knows three knock-knock jokes and two of them are not funny.
Yoshi	A boy from Japan who loves lizards. Hank hosted him in Holy Enchilada!.

== Context ==
Henry Winkler states that in 2003, he experienced "a lull in my acting career." Winkler's then-manager, Alan Berger suggested to Winkler that he should write children's books about the difficulties he experienced as a child before he knew that he was dyslexic. Winkler was resistant to the idea, which he initially thought "was insane," saying that he "couldn't do it." He finally agreed however, after Berger suggested that he co-write the books with an experienced author.

Berger introduced Winkler to his friend, children's book author Lin Oliver. Winkler and Oliver met for lunch, and discussed Winkler's childhood experiences. Oliver remembers thinking that, "here is this very articulate accomplished man, who suffered all through childhood because he wasn't good in school. It's a very moving story. So we created a character together who is smart, funny, resourceful, popular, who's got all the gifts - except that he is bad in school." Oliver and Winkler then developed the premise for a series about a dyslexic child, Hank Zipzer, who is based on Winkler (and every character in the series is also based on a real person in Winkler's life). In naming the character, Winkler chose "Hank" (which is short for Henry), and "Zipzer," which was the name of a neighbor in the apartment building that he grew up in.

Because they had both previously worked in television in multiple roles, they were used to collaborating and discussing ideas and working them out in a room together, which enabled their partnership. Winkler notes that this collaborative process is best reflected in the system they have developed that draws upon Oliver's strengths as a writer and Winkler's as an actor: Oliver types at the computer while Winkler talks. When Oliver has an idea, he waits while she types. When she reads it back to him, "we argue over every word, and then you say 'I have to get up, you drive me to drink.' And she gets a Snapple from the kitchen."

The series ran from 2003 to 2010, consisting of 17 volumes. After they finished it, Winkler and Oliver created a prequel series, Here's Hank (2012 to 2016) that explores Hank's life as a second grader, before he was diagnosed as dyslexic. The Here's Hank series also uses a special font called "dyslexie" (marking the first time that this font was used in book published in the United States).

== Adaptations ==
Hank Zipzer is a British children's television series which stars Nick James in the titular role as a 12-year-old dyslexic schoolboy. Henry Winkler portrays Mr. Rock, Hank's music teacher, in the series. The first series premiered in January 2014 on the CBBC channel. Unlike the books that took place in Winkler's native United States, the series takes place in London, in the United Kingdom. The second series began airing on 13 August 2015. Javone Prince made his first appearance as Mr. Joy in season 2, episode 5, "Hank's Hero". The third series began airing on 26 May 2016, which was followed by an 84-minute Christmas movie released on 12 December 2016.

HBO Max began streaming all three seasons of Hank Zipzer in May 2022, and Hank Zipzer's Christmas Catastrophe in December 2022.

== Reception ==
=== Accolades and honors ===
Henry Winkler has been recognized for contributing to a greater understanding of dyslexia and learning disabilities through the Hank Zipzer series. He was given the Key to the City of Winnipeg for "contributions to education and literacy," (2010) was appointed an Honorary Officer of the Order of the British Empire (OBE) "for services to children with special educational needs and dyslexia in the UK" by Queen Elizabeth (2011), was named one of the United Kingdom's Top 10 Literacy Heroes (2013), and was awarded the Bill Rosendahl Public Service Award for Contributions to the Public Good for his children's books (2019).

== List of books ==
1. Niagara Falls, or Does It? (January 1, 2003)

Instead of writing an assigned essay on his summer vacation, Hank tries building a model of Niagara Falls, his family's summer vacation spot. This was adapted in the TV series as "Classroom Catastrophe", the first episode of Series 1 and the overall series.

2. I Got a "D" in Salami (May 12, 2003)

Hank tosses his report card in his mother's meat grinder to get out of showing his parents his report card. The chase is on when he finds out his report-card-salami is going to one of his mom's most important sponsor choices! This was adapted in the TV series as "The Mortadella Disaster", the eighth episode of Series 1.

3. Day of the Iguana (September 1, 2003)

Hank tries to disassemble and reassemble the cable box for his science project. But how is he supposed to put it back together when Katherine the iguana has laid her eggs in it? This was adapted in the TV series as "Battle of the Goblins", the fourth episode of Series 1.

4. The Zippity Zinger (December 1, 2003)

Hank's friends choose Hank to be the pitcher for their school, P.S. 87's Olympiad baseball team. Since Hank can't pitch for his life, he thinks his sister's lucky red monkey socks may be the answer. Only one problem – Emily needs them on the same day for her part of the Olympiad! This was adapted in the TV series as "The Lucky Socks", the second episode of Series 1.

5. The Night I Flunked My Field Trip (May 1, 2004)

Hank has an overnight field trip to a docked boat in New York Harbor. But when Hank accidentally undocks the boat, the trouble begins...He makes friends with Colin Sebastian Rich IV.

6. Holy Enchilada! (August 19, 2004)

Hank needs to prepare some enchiladas for his school multi-cultural day. But, he may have added too much hot sauce... Elements from this book were adapted in the TV series as "Anyone for Lizard?", the twelfth episode of Series 1.

7. Help! Somebody Get me out of Fourth Grade! (December 16, 2004)

When his parents get called for a parent-teacher conference, Hank just knows his teacher is going to tell them he's being held back. There's just one way to make sure they don't show up - sabotage!

8. Summer School! What Genius Thought That Up? (April 21, 2005)

Hank gets sent to summer school without his friends, Frankie Townsend and Ashley Wong.

9. My Secret Life as a Ping-pong Wizard (September 22, 2005)

Hank's finally in the fifth grade, except he is still stuck with Ms. Adolf and he's also found a sport he's good at - ping-pong! But when his friends tease the sport, Hank decides to keep it a secret.

10. My Dog's a Scaredy-Cat: A Halloween Tail (August 1, 2006)

Hank tries to scare Nick in a haunted house he makes with his friends. This was adapted in the TV series as "Haunted Hank", the fifth episode of Series 1.

11. The Curtain Went Up, My Pants Fell Down (May 3, 2007)

Hank gets a lead part in a school play (The King and I) but he can only do the play if he gets a B plus on his next math test. He has a math tutor called Heather Payne. This was adapted in the TV series as the third episode of Series 1.

12. Barfing in the Backseat: How I Survived My Family Road Trip (July 5, 2007)

The Zipzers take a road trip to a crossword puzzle tournament and a roller coaster park in North Carolina. But when he mistakenly leaves Ms. Adolf's vacation homework packet at a motel, he and Frankie set out to have it delivered - without Mr. Zipzer finding out.

13. Who Ordered This Baby? Definitely Not Me! (December 27, 2007)

Hank hears his mom talking to Frankie's mom over the phone about a baby. Frankie will be shocked! Or at least until Hank realizes she was talking about herself! This was adapted in the TV series as "Who Ordered the Baby?", the ninth episode of Series 1.

14. The Life of Me: Enter at Your Own Risk (May 1, 2008)

Mr. Rock takes over as Hank's teacher. Hank is psyched....until Mr. Rock suggests that Hank takes an after school reading program, which means he will have to miss tae kwon do. But when Hank gets a crush on a girl in the reading program, and when Mr. Rock says, instead of doing an autobiography (a class assignment), Hank may do a scrapbook of his life, everything is going right. Then Hank finds out that the girl he likes is Nick McKelty's cousin. Elements from this book were adapted in the TV series as "My First Date Dilemma", the thirteenth episode of Series 1.

15. A Tale of Two Tails (November 26, 2008)

Hank's school holds a pet contest and the winner becomes the school mascot. How is Hank supposed to train his dachshund, Cheerio, if he (Cheerio) keeps messing around?

16. Dump Trucks and Dogsleds: I'm on My Way, Mom! (August 6, 2009)

Hank's mom is having a baby, and the baby is going to share a room with Hank. Hank did feel better when his dad took his sister Emily and him on a 'pre-baby' ski trip. But when Hank's mom called to say the baby was coming early, they had to cut their trip short. The only problem was that a freak snowstorm had arrived and they were stuck. Whether they had to ride on horses, dump trucks, dogsleds, or even in a truck with ten Chinese acrobats, they would get home in time to meet Baby Zipzer. Elements from this book were adapted in Hank Zipzer's Christmas Catastrophe, a Christmas TV movie set in the universe of the TV series.

17. A Brand-New Me! (April 20, 2010)

Hank can't graduate without his community service, so Mr. Rock gives him a job cleaning instruments and, while doing the job, Hank discovers his ability to write short plays on the spot, and auditions for a Performing Arts school, all before finding out that Frankie and Ashley will be going to a different school.

18. The Colossal Camera Calamity (04 Jun 2015; based on the CBBC TV series, not part of the original book series)

It's school-photo time, which is the worst time of year for Hank Zipzer. No matter what he does, he always ends up looking like he's just seen Miss Adolf dancing. Bleurg! This year, he's determined to get it right. Unfortunately school bully Nick McKelty has other ideas... This was adapted in the TV series as "Camera Calamity", the first episode of Series 2.

== See also ==
- List of artistic depictions of dyslexia
