= Javone Prince =

British comedian and actor

Comedy career
- Years active: 2002–present
- Medium: Television
- Genres: Sitcom, Sketch, drama

Javone Prince is a British comedian and actor. He has appeared in many British comedy television shows, such as Horrible Histories, Sorry, I've Got No Head and Little Miss Jocelyn. He also featured in The Dumping Ground as the character Lethal G. Prince is best known for starring as Jerwayne in PhoneShop. Prince also appears in several theatre productions including, Measure for Measure, Titus Andronicus and Richard III. He trained at LAMDA and is currently a member of the National Theatre.

In July and August 2015, Prince's eponymous sketch show The Javone Prince Show was shown on BBC Two.

== Filmography ==
=== Television ===
| Year | Programme | Role | Notes |
|---|---|---|---|
| 2002–2011 | My Family | Various | 3 episodes |
| 2004 | Murder Prevention | Adam Yorke | 1 episode |
| 2005 | According to Bex | Vox Pop | 1 episode |
| 2006–2008 | Little Miss Jocelyn | Various | 3 episodes |
| 2007 | Angelo's | Mickey P | 6 episodes |
| 2007 | Tittybangbang | Various | 2 episodes |
| 2008 | The Bill | Damon Watt | 1 episode |
| 2009 | Comedy Showcase | Jerwayne | 1 episode: "PhoneShop" |
| 2009–2013 | PhoneShop | Jerwayne | Main cast (19 episodes) |
| 2009–2019 | Horrible Histories | Various | 9 episodes |
| 2010 | Rev. | Policeman Lloyd | 1 episode |
| 2010 | Hotel Trubble | Z Dogg | 1 episode |
| 2011 | Sorry, I've Got No Head | Actor | 13 Episodes |
| 2011 | Life's Too Short | Passerby | 1 episode |
| 2012 | Mr Blue Sky | Kill-R | 3 episodes |
| 2013 | Bitchcraft | 8Ball | |
| 2013 | Plebs | Bouncer | 1 episode |
| 2013 | Youngers | Bouncer | Uncredited (1 episode) |
| 2013 | Quick Cuts | Tiny | 2 episodes |
| 2014 | BBC Comedy Feeds | Courier | 1 episode |
| 2014 | Outnumbered | Pool Attendant | 1 episode |
| 2014–2016 | Flat TV | Carl, Courier | 5 episodes |
| 2015 | The Javone Prince Show | Himself, various | 4 episodes, Nominated: 62nd BAFTA Television Award for Best Male Comedy Performance |
| 2015–2016 | Hank Zipzer | Mr Joy | 18 episodes |
| 2016 | Hank Zipzer's Christmas Catastrophe | Mr Joy | TV Movie |
| 2016 | A Midsummer Night's Dream | Snug | TV Movie |
| 2016 | I Want My Wife Back | Zak | 2 episodes |
| 2017 | Murder on the Blackpool Express | Ben | TV Movie |
| 2017 | Zapped | Rolf | 1 episode |
| 2017 | Absolutely Fine | Boilerman | 1 episode |
| 2017 | Drunk History | | 1 episode |
| 2017 | Inside No. 9 | Duane | 1 episode |
| 2018 | The Queen and I | Carlton Moses | TV Movie |
| 2018 | Still Open All Hours | Alvin | 1 episode |
| 2018 | Sticky | Ashley | 1 episode |
| 2018–2019 | Find Me in Paris | Oscar | 14 episodes |
| 2019 | The Tool | Jazz Michaels | TV Movie |
| 2019 | Timewasters | Pastor Gabriel | 1 episode |
| 2019 | The Dumping Ground | Leathal G | 1 episode |
| 2019–2021 | Sliced | Call Centre Worker | 2 episodes |
| 2020 | Maxxx | Lucky | 6 episodes |
| 2020 | Love Monster | Bad Idea Puppy | Voice, 1 episode |
| 2020 | Housebound | Isaiah | 1 episode |
| 2020 | Death in Paradise | Clarence Delport | 1 episode |
| 2022–2023 | Dodger | PC Blathers | 13 episodes |
| 2023 | Three Little Birds | Aston Brahms | 6 episodes |
| 2024 | Trying | Anthony | 4 episodes |
| 2025 | Living the Dream | Ray | Voice |

=== Film ===
- Manderlay (2005) as Jack
- Mumbo Jumbo (2005) as Gool
- The Judge (2005) as Afrikansk mand
- The Tiger and the Snow (2005) as Soldato americano
- At Home with Beyonce (2011) as Jay Z
- The School that Got Teens Reading as presenter (2016)
- No Time to Die (2021) as Counter Don
