= Lin Oliver =

American writer and producer (born 1947)

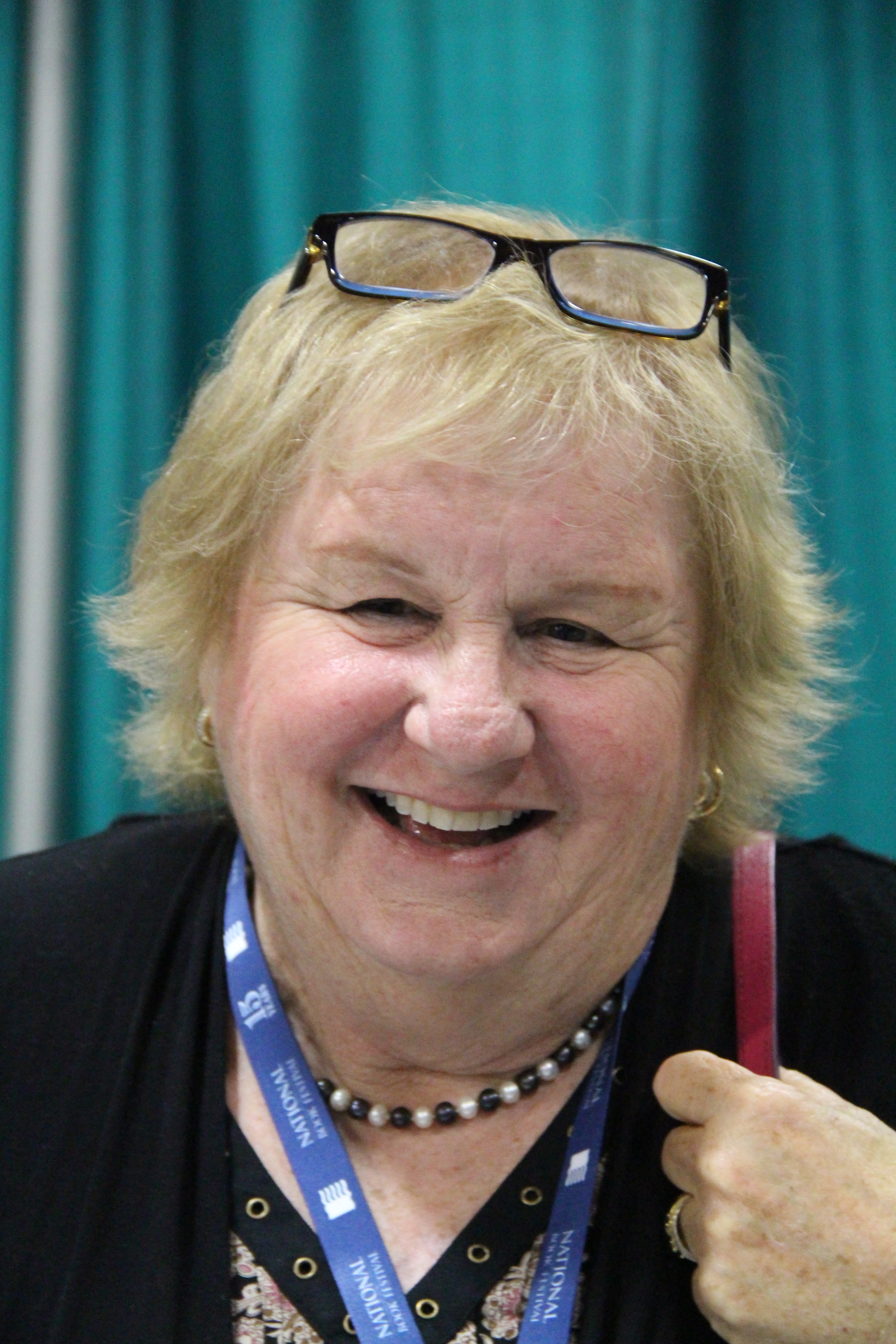
- Oliver at the 2015 National Book Festival
- Born: February 2, 1947 (age 79); Los Angeles, California, U.S.
- Education: University of California, Berkeley (B.A.); University of California, Los Angeles (Masters)
- Occupation: Author
- Spouse: Alan Baker
- Children: 3
- Writing career
- Genres: Children's literature (Co-founder, Society of Children's Book Writers and Illustrators); Film; Television
- Notable works: Hank Zipzer; Harry and the Hendersons

Lin Oliver (born February 2, 1947) is an American writer, producer, and the co-founder (with Steve Mooser) of the Society of Children's Book Writers and Illustrators. During the 1990s and early 2000s, she wrote and produced a number of works for television and film, notably the 1990s television show, Harry and the Hendersons. As an author of books for children, Oliver began collaborating on the Hank Zipzer series with actor Henry Winkler in 2003. They next created the prequel series Here's Hank, the Ghost Buddy series, and the Alien Superstar series.

== Childhood and education ==
Oliver was born in Los Angeles, California, and was the editor-in-chief of her school newspaper at Ulysses S. Grant High School. She received her B.A. in English Literature from the University of California, Berkeley, a Masters in Educational Psychology from the University of California, Los Angeles, and has completed coursework for an Ed.D. (also UCLA).

== Career ==
Oliver won a job working in television through a contest after graduating from college. She then quit the position, and found a federally funded job for a children's writer (creating a K-6 reading series for children) at the unemployment office. In the position, she worked with Steve Mooser during a three-year contract to create stories and novels as part of the Great Society program. As neither knew much about the field, both Oliver and Mooser realized that they needed to create an organization dedicated to children's literature, and thus created the Society of Children's Book Writers and Illustrators (where Lin is now executive director).

Oliver was the Executive Vice President of MCA Universal for 12 years, and was the writer and executive producer for "over 300 episodes of television and three feature films," including Harry and the Hendersons. She currently runs her own production company, Lin Oliver Productions, and is the author of a number of children's books including, Who Shrunk Daniel Funk, and Almost Identical.

In 2003, Oliver began to collaborate with actor Henry Winkler on the Hank Zipzer children's book series. All of the characters in the books are based on real people, including Hank who is based on Winkler as a child. The idea originated with Winkler's agent at CAA, Alan Berger, who in 1998 first suggested the idea to him. However, Winkler did not believe he was capable of creating children's books. It was only a few years later, after the suggestion was made to him again, that Winkler agreed, and began collaborating with Oliver. After they completed the main books, Oliver and Winkler created a prequel series, Here's Hank that explores Hank's life as a second grader (2012 to 2016). Oliver and Winkler co-authored the TV-tie in books to the series. They continued to work together on the Ghost Buddy books (2012–2013), the Alien Superstar series (2019–2021), and the Detective Duck series.

== Personal life ==
Oliver is married to Alan Baker, Associate Dean, USC School of Cinematic Arts. They have three sons, Theo, Ollie, and Cole.

== Works ==
=== Books ===
Oliver has written a number of books for children, as well as co-authored children's series with Henry Winkler and Theo Baker.

With Henry Winkler

- Hank Zipzer: The World's Greatest Underachiever (18 volumes, 2003–2010, 2015).
- Ghost Buddy (4 volumes, 2012–2013).
- Here's Hank (12 volumes, 2014–2019).
- Alien Superstar (3 volumes, 2019–2021).
- Detective Duck (2023-present)

Who Shrunk Daniel Funk series

- Attack of the Growling Eyeballs. (2008)
- Escape of the Mini-Mummy. (2008)
- Revenge of the Itty-Bitty Brothers. (2009)
- Secret of the Super-Small Superstar. (2010)

Sound Bender series (with Theo Baker)

- Sound Bender. (2011)
- The Shadow Mask. (2013)

Almost Identical series

- Almost Identical. (2012)
- Two-Faced. (2012)
- Double-crossed. (2013)
- Twice as Nice. (2014)

Fantastic Frame series

- Danger! Tiger Crossing (2016)
- Splat! Another Messy Sunday (2016)
- Beware! Shadows in the Night (2016)
- Look Out! Ghost Mountain Below (2017)
- Warning! Journey to Forever (2019)

=== Film and television ===
- Wayside (producer) (2007–2008)
- The Trumpet of the Swan (producer) (2001)
- Finding Buck McHenry (producer) (2000)
- The Ruby Ring (writer, producer) (1997)
- The Adventures of Corduroy the Bear (producer) (1993)
- Harry and the Hendersons (executive producer) (1991)
- Be Somebody... or Be Somebody's Fool! (executive producer (1984)
- Wayside: The Movie (writer) (2005)
- The Adventures of Corduroy the Bear (producer, director) (1997)
- Harry and the Hendersons (TV series)

"The Long Goodbyes: Part 2" (writer) 1993
"The Long Goodbyes: Part 1" (story) 1993)
"The Write Stuff" (writer) (1993)
"Born Again" (writer) (1992)
"Sara Sings the Blues" (1991) (writer)
