= List of Beautiful People characters =

Beautiful People is British comedy series, following the life of Simon Doonan, a schoolboy living in Reading, England in 1997. Simon is also seen in present-day New York (and in the second series, present day Reading) using short prologues and epilogues in the show. Alongside Simon, are his mother, Debbie, his father, Andy, his older sister Ashlene and his best friend, Kyle "Kylie" Parkinson.

== Simon Doonan ==
Simon Doonan (Luke Ward-Wilkinson/Samuel Barnett) is the main character and narrator of Beautiful People. He is based on the Barneys window dresser Simon Doonan, who grew up in the 1960s, however, the character grows up in the 1990s. Like his real namesake, Simon is half English and Irish. In 1997, Simon lived in Reading with his parents, sister, and his mother's best friend, Hayley. However, in the present day he lives in New York City with his boyfriend Sacha, and later returns to Reading when he splits up with Sacha. Simon is known by his camp, effeminate behaviour. His best friend is Kyle "Kylie" Parkinson, an equally camp boy who lives across the road in Reading. They are close friends and have only once fallen out, when Simon dyed Kylie's hair wrong, causing him to look like a blond "Ronald McDonald". In 1997 Simon had curtained hair, a haircut very popular in the 1990s. Simon became an accomplished football player after he discovered his idol, Victoria Beckham (then known as Victoria "Posh Spice" Adams), was to marry David Beckham. Simon has a lightning bolt-shaped scar on his forehead, similar to Harry Potter, however he always conceals it with makeup. Simon was a big fan of Steps when he was younger. Simon and Kylie ran away from home to London, but his parents realised and called the police after seeing him on Live & Kicking. Simon, who hoped to be on the stage, wanted to be educated at Madame Darcy's School of Theatre, but his parents refused. After qualifying at school Simon became a set dresser on Live With Loretta (a parody of GMTV with Lorraine). He then becomes a window dresser at Barneys in New York. In the second series, Simon and Sacha have split up and Simon returns to the family home in Reading; he soon finds a new job at Selfridges in London. He comes out to his mother (through a letter, read in voice-over while he and his crush Mickey dance on the roof and almost kiss) in the last episode of season 2, after she tells him that she loves him no matter what and that other boys are crap (after he says that he isn't "like other boys"). Simon becomes engaged to Mickey in the last episode of season 2 (in the 2009 epilogue). In the end, Simon states that even though he spent his life wishing he was with the beautiful people, he now knows they were with him all along, quoting Judy Garland 'There really is no place like home'.

== Debbie Doonan ==
Debbie Doonan attending the funeral of Tameka

Debbie Doonan (Olivia Colman) is Simon's mother, who lives with him, Andy, Ashlene and best friend Hayley at 19 Melody Crescent. Debbie Doonan is described by Simon as "the most glamorous woman in Reading", however, her glamorous reputation is temporarily tarnished when her hairdresser, Tameka, dies half way through her haircut. She has peroxide blonde bleached hair and hair extensions. Debbie is a cigarette smoker and a heavy drinker, and won a year's free supply of gin in a poetry competition. Supposedly, Debbie and Andy drank so heavily when they married that they cannot remember the date (either June 14 or May 8), but it is eventually revealed that this is actually because they had both been lying, and had not in fact got married at all. Debbie quits drinking for a week to prove to Simon that she is not "Reading's answer to Oliver Reed", however Debbie eventually succumbs to Andy's homemade gherkin and cucumber wine after being called a "moody bitch" when sober. Debbie is outspoken and very opinionated, but always loving to her children. A barmaid at the local pub, Debbie attacks Simon's teacher, after discovering she allowed him to drink with her in the pub. She also charges people to read their tea leaves, despite her possessing no psychic ability. Debbie is an excellent fighter and has various brawls with Reba (Kylie's mother) and pushes an American woman through a plate glass window for "suspiciously" touching her bum bag. She also gets arrested for assault after punching Tristram Bell, the school drama teacher, but he decides not to press charges. Her previous criminal record involved her throwing a Cadbury's Creme Egg at Margaret Thatcher, but she missed and hit a police officer, causing his eye to swell up the size of a golf ball according to the judge. She speaks fluent Polish, after taking in two Polish lodgers in 2009.

== Andy Doonan ==
Andrew "Andy" Doonan (Aidan McArdle) is Simon's father who lives in Melody Crescent with his family. Andy is a self-employed plumber. Neighbour Reba often attempts to engage in an affair with Andy, however he always refuses, and would never cheat on Debbie. Reba later accuses him of being a flasher after the zip on Andy's jeans becomes broken. His mother, Gwen Doonan, was a devout Catholic. He often distills his own alcohol and has made potato wine, parsnip wine and marmalade wine. He suffers nightmares involving Cabbage Patch Dolls. Andy, under instructions from Debbie, attempts to teach Simon football until he kicks the ball into his face.

== Ashlene Doonan ==
Ashlene Doonan (Sophie Ash) is the older sister of Simon Doonan. She has a reputation as a promiscuous girl, and has dated every man in her street except 'Backward Frank'. She blackmails Simon by taking a picture of him in a stolen dress owned by Reba and threatens to show the picture to everybody unless he styles her hair "like Heather Small from M People". When growing up she aspired to either move to Paris and sell her body or work at Woolworths. Ashlene was the victim of a flasher, who flashed at her outside Nando's, she was upset when the flasher did not want her phone number. The second series includes an ongoing storyline concerning Ashlene's unplanned pregnancy, which concludes with her giving birth to a boy 'Puff Daddy Doonan', fathered by Jayeson Jackson (a school bully in Simon's year).

== Aunty Hayley ==
Hayley de Souza (Meera Syal), better known simply as Aunty Hayley, is a lodger who stays with the Doonans. She is best friends with Debbie Doonan, and first met her when Debbie was working in the pub. Hayley was born in Bushey, Hertfordshire, but moves in with the Doonans so Debbie can wean her off her amphetamine addiction. Hayley is blind, and she describes Helen Keller as her role model. While Hayley claims to be "blind" she insinuates that she can actually "see". She participated in the Greenham Common Women's Peace Camp and frequently recalls her time there. She buys Simon a nylon tracksuit, which he loathes. Simon seeks revenge, after he is made to wear a nylon tracksuit, and blackmails her for £30 after discovering her eating burgers, after she had stated that she would only eat "nuts and berries". Hayley briefly dates Billy Bingo until she discovers he is the mysterious flasher who exposed himself to Ashlene. She, like Debbie, is a cigarette smoker. After Hayley and Debbie have an argument Hayley moves out and lives with her friend Sheila-Galesha, but moves back after finding her annoying.

=== Mummy ===
Mummy is Hayley's overweight guide dog, who herself has poor eyesight. After a visit to the vet, Hayley discovers that if Mummy doesn't participate in an 'apples only' diet to lose weight, she will die. Her favourite food becomes Golden Delicious apples. She weighs 110 lbs. At Tameka's funeral Mummy dives upon the coffin, dragging Hayley in too, after apples (Tameka's favourite too) are dropped into the grave. Mummy's boyfriend Fido dies "doing a number two", leading Debbie to believe she possesses psychic powers, due to Simon tricking her.

== Kylie Parkinson ==
Kyle "Kylie" Parkinson (Layton Williams) is Simon Doonan's best friend, who lives across the road with his single mother, Reba Parkinson. He is nicknamed Kylie after his idol, Kylie Minogue. Kylie's father, Matt, bullies him and assaults his mother, causing Kylie to push him out of a window, impaling him on a miniature Eiffel Tower in Reba's garden. Reba claims that he is related to Paul Robeson, however this is most probably untrue. As well as idolising Kylie Minogue, he loves Princess Diana, and was so distraught when he heard of her death that he had to be sedated with Night Nurse (medicine). In an attempt to look more like Princess Diana, Kylie gets Simon to dye his hair blonde, which turns out disastrously wrong and causing them to fall out, until they become friends again after the death of Diana. The two are best friends, and after Simon's nose is nearly broken by Imelda, Kylie pours red dye over her, similar to on Carrie.

== Reba Parkinson ==
Reba sporting a dress similar to the iconic 'Union Jack dress' worn by Geri Halliwell at the 1997 Brit Awards

Reba Parkinson (Sarah Niles) is the mother of Kylie Parkinson. She is the daughter of Roy and Enid. Reba speaks with a mancunian accent, as she previously lived in Manchester with her son and her then-husband, Matt. However, Reba and Kylie are relocated to Reading by a women's charity after she becomes the victim of domestic abuse, subsequently resulting in Matt's imprisonment. Reba becomes a single parent, raising her child whilst taking a job as a checkout worker in Poundland. She occasionally attempts to engage in extramarital relations with Andy, however she is constantly rebuffed. As a result, she is constantly branded a "slut" by Debbie, who regularly implies that Reba has a "reputation". Matt accuses Reba of once being a prostitute, to which she strongly denies. She frequently calls Kylie a "batty boy" and is keen for him to find a girlfriend, despite defending his mannerisms when Matt returns. After Kylie accidentally kills Matt Reba lies to the police in order to protect Kylie, saying he jumped from the window on a suicide mission, as she does not want her son to be punished for killing the man who abused the both of them. She usually wears various gold jewellery, including her trademark 'R' necklace, and has a Grace Jones-style haircut.

== Tameka ==
Tameka (Tameka Empson) is a hairdresser in Reading, who owns her owned her own shop, Reservoir Bobs (a pun of Reservoir Dogs) until her death in 1997. Tameka is good friends with Debbie, and shares her love of alcohol. She has relatives living in Jamaica. Her most coveted possession is her golden hair tongs, which she won at a hair styling competition, freestyle section. The tongs are later stolen by Kylie whilst Tameka is lying in repose. Tameka's other favourite items include Brazil nuts, water melons, apples and rum. Tameka claimed to be secretly married to George Michael before he came out. She also claimed to be in the final three for the role of the Shake 'n' Vac woman. Tameka loves to sing, with her answering machine message involving her singing the chorus of "Waterloo" by ABBA. However, she despises pop acts such as Steps. Tameka dies in 1997 of a heart attack whilst cutting Debbie's hair, causing her to have a hacked, half-cut haircut.

=== Johoyo ===
After Tameka's death, her even more eccentric 'identical cousin' Johoyo (also played by Tameka Empson) takes over the salon, renaming it Johoyo's Hair a Go-Go. Both Debbie and Hayley continue to use the salon even though Johoyo displays no hairdressing skill or knowledge whatsoever, to the extent of not even knowing the word "scissors", calling them "cutty cutty boom booms".

== Miss Perrin ==
Miss Perrin (Michelle Butterly) is the headteacher at Simon's school in Reading. She was once a television star and appeared as a Hill's Angel on The Benny Hill Show, however she changed her career and became headteacher. Miss Perrin has ginger hair and claims she's often mistaken for Ginger Spice. She originates from Liverpool and speaks with a thick Liverpudlian accent, causing Aunty Hayley to mistake her for Cilla Black. A picture of her with Benny Hill shows her first name to be Cheryl. She excludes Simon for two days after both falsely believing he stole her clutch bag and caused a fight with school bully, Jayeson Jackson. She often wears powder pink colours and pearls, resulting in Simon describing her as "the most glamorous person" he knows. She is known to have attended university, as she mentions that she has letters after her name.

== Mickey McCann ==
Mickey McCann (Benny Gur) is a boy who arrives at Simon's school in the last episode of series 2 ('How I Got My Gash'), who initially seems to be friendly towards Simon and Kylie, but later joins up with Jayeson Jackson's gang and bullies them. Simon is attracted to him from the moment he sees him, and remains so throughout the bullying. When Simon decides to run away at the end of the episode, he meets Mickey at the bus stop and Mickey offers him a lift home on his bike (because there was a bus strike on). They sit on Simon's roof near the end of the episode, talking about why Mickey had to leave his old school (someone found a letter he wrote to Jason Orange saying how he felt about him). The two then sing and dance on the roof and almost kiss, however the ambulance for Ashlene turns up and causes Simon to fall off the roof in shock, saying: "Oh my God, I'll go to Reading Jail", (a reference to Oscar Wilde's imprisonment for homosexuality). In 2009, Simon announces to his shocked mother that he is getting married, he hastily clarifies that it is to Mickey from school (who he has been Skyping with since he returned from New York).

== Jayeson Jackson ==
Jayeson Jackson (Josh Handley) is student at Simon's school who frequently bullies Simon and Kylie because of their effeminate qualities. He is only once nice to Simon in one episode in series one ('How I Got My Posh'), where he gives Simon a Posh Spice doll after Simon wins a football match and rejects the trophy as being too garish. Jayeson plays a large part in the series two final ('How I got My Gash') where his bullying of Simon and Kylie intensifies, and he is revealed to be the father of Ashlene's baby.
