= Olivia Colman =

British actress (born 1974)

Olivia Colman CBE
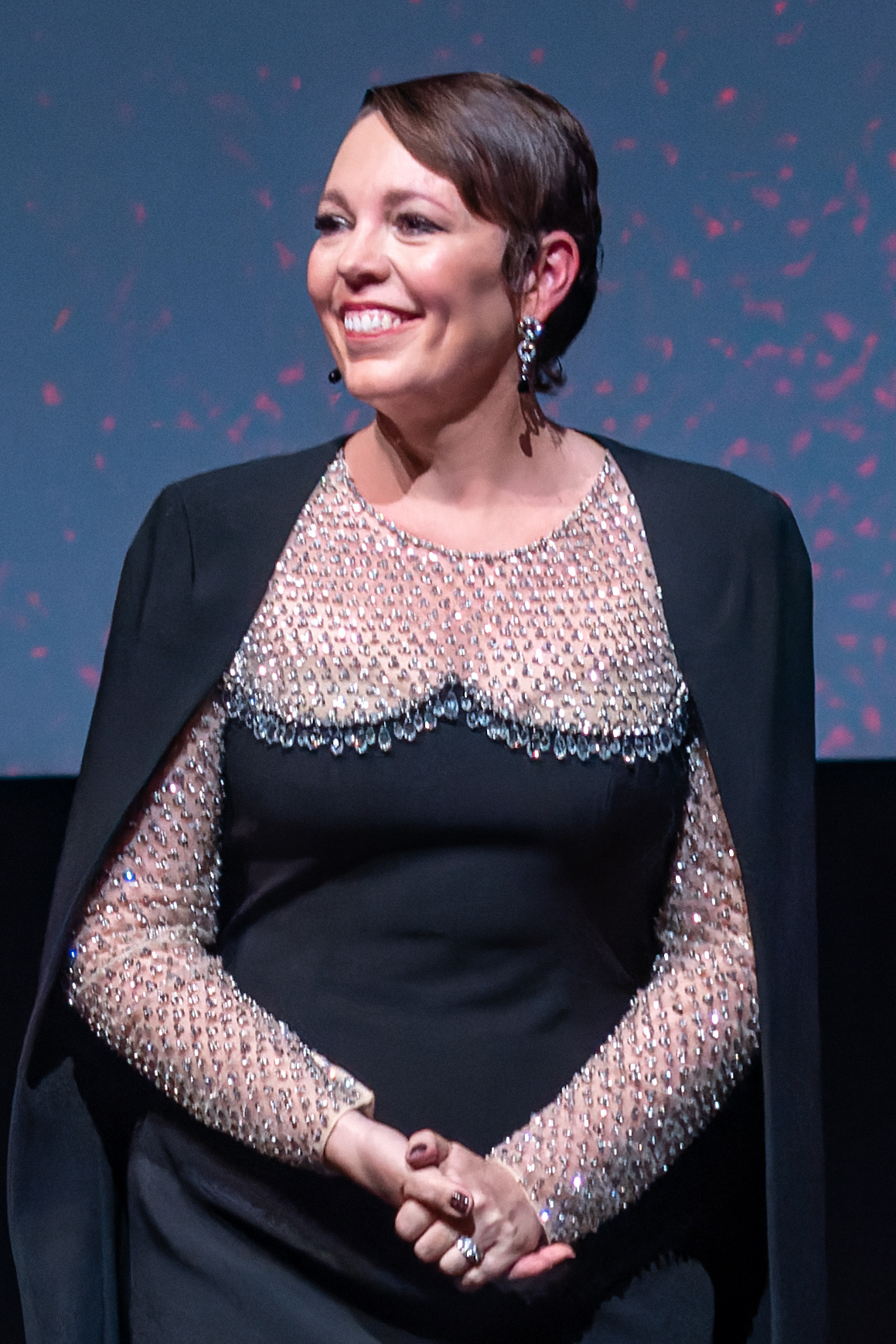
- Colman in 2022
- Born: Sarah Caroline Colman; 30 January 1974 (age 52); Norwich, Norfolk, England
- Education: Bristol Old Vic Theatre School
- Occupations: Actress; voice actress
- Years active: 2000–present
- Spouse: Ed Sinclair (m. 2001)
- Children: 3
- Awards: Full list

President of UNICEF UK
- Incumbent
- Assumed office 3 September 2020
- Deputy: Jon Sparkes

Sarah Caroline Sinclair (née Colman; born 30 January 1974), known professionally as Olivia Colman, (Note: There was already a member of Equity (the UK actors' union) using the name Sarah Colman, so Colman chose Olivia as a stage name; she later took her husband's surname when they married.) is an English actress. Known for her versatility across both comedic and dramatic roles predominantly in independent film, she has received various accolades, including an Academy Award, four BAFTAs, two Emmy Awards, three Golden Globe Awards and a Volpi Cup.

A graduate of the Bristol Old Vic Theatre School, Colman's breakthrough came in the Channel 4 sitcom Peep Show (2003–2015). Her other comedic roles on television include Green Wing (2004–2006), That Mitchell and Webb Look (2006–2008), Beautiful People (2008–2009), Rev. (2010–2014), Flowers (2016–2018), and Fleabag (2016–2019). Colman received the BAFTA Award for Best Female Comedy Performance for the comedy series Twenty Twelve (2011–2012) and Best Supporting Actress for the crime series Accused (2012).

Colman earned acclaim for her performance in the ITV crime-drama series Broadchurch (2013–2017), for which she received the British Academy Television Award for Best Actress, and in the BBC One thriller series The Night Manager (2016–2026), for which she received the Golden Globe Award for Best Supporting Actress. She played Queen Elizabeth II from 2019 to 2020 in the Netflix period drama series The Crown, for which she received the Golden Globe Award and the Primetime Emmy Award for Outstanding Lead Actress. Her other television credits include Les Misérables (2019), Landscapers (2021), Heartstopper (2022–2023), and The Bear (2023–2025).

Colman achieved wider recognition for her portrayal of Anne, Queen of Great Britain in the period black-comedy film The Favourite (2018), which won her the Academy Award for Best Actress. She received further Academy Award nominations for her performances in the dramas The Father (2020) and The Lost Daughter (2021). Her other notable film credits include Tyrannosaur (2011), The Iron Lady (2011), Hyde Park on Hudson (2012), Locke (2013), The Lobster (2015), Empire of Light (2022), Puss in Boots: The Last Wish (2022), Wonka (2023), Wicked Little Letters (2023), Paddington in Peru (2024), and The Roses (2025).

== Early life and education ==
Sarah Caroline Colman was born in Norwich, England, on 30 January 1974, the daughter of nurse Mary (née Leakey) and Chartered Surveyor Keith Colman.

She was privately educated at Norwich High School for Girls and then sixth form at Gresham's School in Holt, Norfolk from 1990 to 1992. Colman's first role was as Jean Brodie in a school production of The Prime of Miss Jean Brodie at age 16. She cites her mother's interrupted career as a ballet dancer as an inspiration to pursue acting professionally. Colman spent a term studying primary education at Homerton College, Cambridge before studying drama at the Bristol Old Vic Theatre School, from which she graduated in 1999. During her time at Cambridge, she appeared in the Channel 4 series The Word in 1995 under her nickname "Colly", auditioned for the Cambridge University Footlights Dramatic Club and met future co-stars David Mitchell and Robert Webb.

Colman had to adopt a different stage name when she began working professionally because Equity (the UK actors' union) already had an actress named Sarah Colman. "One of my best friends at university was called Olivia and I always loved her name," Colman told The Independent in 2013. "I was never Sarah; I was always called by my nickname, Colly, so it didn't seem so awful not to be called Sarah."

In July 2018, Colman was a subject of the UK genealogy programme Who Do You Think You Are?. Although Colman expected that her family tree would mainly relate to Norfolk, it was discovered that her fourth great-grandfather Richard Campbell Bazett had been born on Saint Helena and that he worked in London for the East India Company. Bazett's son, Colman's third great-grandfather Charles Bazett, married Harriot Slessor. Researchers discovered that she was born in the city of Kishanganj, in north-eastern India, lost her British father when she was aged 3 and then made the journey to England alone; this passage was paid for by her paternal grandmother. When in Kishanganj, through meticulously kept records, including diary entries, newspaper clippings, letters and a list of family possessions, Colman learnt that Harriot's father was living with an Indian woman while in Bihar and Harriot was their child.

== Career ==
=== 2000–2009: Early work on television ===
Colman made her professional acting debut in 2000 at age 26 as part of the BBC Two comedy sketch show, Bruiser. She appeared in BBC, ITV and Channel 4 television series including People Like Us, Look Around You, Black Books, The Office and The Time of Your Life. Colman provided the voice-over for Channel 5's poll for Britain's Funniest Comedy Character.

Colman regularly appeared on BBC Radio 4 comedies such as Concrete Cow, Think the Unthinkable, The House of Milton Jones and Dirk Gently's Holistic Detective Agency. Colman was the voice of Minka, the Polish secretary in the Radio 4 comedy Hut 33 set in a fictional code-breaking hut at Bletchley Park during World War II. Colman appeared as Bev, with Mark Burdis as Kev, in a series of television advertisements for AA car insurance. She provided voices for the Andrex "Be kind to your behind" and Glade fragrance advertisements (playing a gorilla).

On several projects, Colman has worked with the comedians Mitchell and Webb. She joined them in 2003 to play Sophie in the Channel 4 comedy Peep Show. Other joint ventures have included radio's That Mitchell and Webb Sound and its television version, That Mitchell and Webb Look. She decided to leave the programme after her agent suggested that she was becoming too closely associated with their work and needed to widen her horizons, a decision which was made "with tears". Colman continued to appear on Peep Show less often until it ended in 2015.

She had a recurring role in the surrealist comedy Green Wing from 2004 to 2006. One of her earliest film credits is naturist Joanna Roberts in the 2006 mockumentary film Confetti, a role she has described as "the worst experience of my life".

In 2007, Colman starred as Alice in the comedy film Grow Your Own and as PC Doris Thatcher in the action comedy film Hot Fuzz. She also played a lead role in Paddy Considine's short film Dog Altogether. She appeared in October and November 2008 in the BBC sitcom Beautiful People (based on the life of Simon Doonan) as Debbie Doonan, Simon's mother. Colman made a guest appearance in the episode "Naomi" of the series Skins as Naomi's mother, Gina. In 2009, she appeared as the character Bernice in the episode "Small Mercies" of the ITV mystery-crime series Midsomer Murders.

=== 2010–2019: Film breakthrough and worldwide recognition ===
Colman had a lead role in 2010 as Alex Smallbone, the wife of an inner-city vicar, in the BBC sitcom Rev. starring Tom Hollander; the series ran from 2010 to 2014. She guest-starred that year in "The Eleventh Hour" episode of Doctor Who, Matt Smith's debut as the Eleventh Doctor. Colman appeared the following year in the BBC drama Exile, written by Danny Brocklehurst and starring John Simm and Jim Broadbent. From 2011 to 2012, she played Ian Fletcher's (Hugh Bonneville) lovelorn secretary Sally Owen in Twenty Twelve, a comedy series about planning for the 2012 Olympic Games in London.

Colman rejoined Considine in 2011 for his feature-film directorial debut, Tyrannosaur, receiving the BIFA for Best Performance by an Actress in a British Independent Film and the Empire Award for Best Actress. She also played Carol Thatcher that year in the Academy Award-winning drama The Iron Lady, with Meryl Streep and Jim Broadbent. She won the London Film Critics' Circle Award for British Actress of the Year for both roles. She also starred in the drama films Hyde Park on Hudson (2012) and Locke (2013).

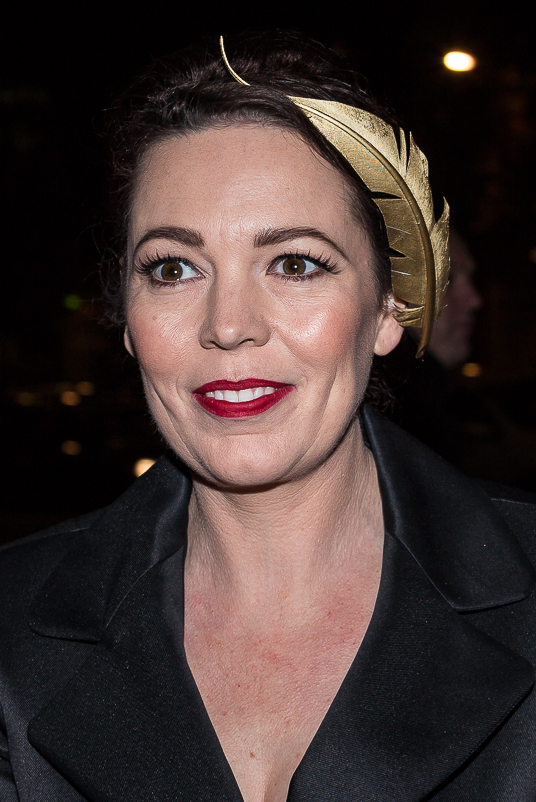
Colman in 2014

In 2013, Colman began playing DS Ellie Miller in ITV's Broadchurch. The crime-drama series, set in the fictional Dorset town of Broadchurch, follows the residents of a tightly knit community after a young boy is found dead on a beach under suspicious circumstances. She was nominated for the International Emmy Award for Best Actress and received the BAFTA TV Award for Best Actress for her performance. Sam Wollaston of The Guardian praised Colman's performance as "brilliant" along with that of her co-star David Tennant. Colman starred (with Vanessa Redgrave) that year as Margaret Lea in the BBC television film, The Thirteenth Tale.

She starred in Yorgos Lanthimos' 2015 absurdist dystopian film, The Lobster, with Rachel Weisz and Colin Farrell. The film premiered at the 2015 Cannes Film Festival, where it competed for the Palme d'Or and received the Jury Prize. Colman was nominated for the London Film Critics' Circle Award for Supporting Actress of the Year and received the BIFA for Best Supporting Actress.

Colman was praised for her performance as Angela Burr in the 2016 AMC-BBC miniseries The Night Manager, for which she was nominated for the Primetime Emmy Award for Outstanding Supporting Actress in a Limited or Anthology Series or Movie, in addition to winning the Golden Globe Award for Best Supporting Actress – Series, Miniseries or Television Film. She starred as Deborah Flowers that year in the Channel 4 black-comedy series, Flowers. Colman voiced Strawberry in the Netflix-BBC animated miniseries, Watership Down. She played Hildegarde Schmidt, Princess Dragomiroff's lady's maid, in Kenneth Branagh's 2017 remake of Agatha Christie's Murder on the Orient Express.

In 2018, Colman starred as Queen Anne in Lanthimos' satirical dark comedy The Favourite alongside Emma Stone and Rachel Weisz. In preparation for the role, she gained 2 st 7 lbs (35 lb, or 16 kg). For her performance, Colman received the Golden Globe Award for Best Actress – Motion Picture Comedy or Musical, the BAFTA Award for Best Actress in a Leading Role, and the Academy Award for Best Actress. Her awestruck, humorous Academy Award acceptance speech was widely covered by the media. That year, she also topped the Radio Times' TV 100 power list, which ranked the most powerful people on television.

Colman received positive reviews for her supporting role as Madame Thénardier in the 2018 BBC miniseries Les Misérables, an adaptation of the novel of the same name. In August 2019, she was confirmed as a guest star (as Lily) in the thirty-second season of the animated comedy series The Simpsons.

In October 2017, Colman was cast as Queen Elizabeth II for the third and fourth seasons of the Netflix historical drama series The Crown; the third season was released in November 2019. For her performance, she received a Golden Globe Award for Best Actress – Television Series Drama. The fourth season was released on 15 November 2020, to universal acclaim and earned her the Primetime Emmy Award for Outstanding Lead Actress in a Drama Series. Her performance also earned her nominations for the Critics' Choice Television Award for Best Actress in a Drama Series and the Screen Actors Guild Award for Outstanding Performance by a Female Actor in a Drama Series. She was part of the ensemble cast that won the Screen Actors Guild Award for Outstanding Performance by an Ensemble in a Drama Series in 2019 and 2020.

=== 2020–present: Established actress ===
Colman starred with Anthony Hopkins in Florian Zeller's 2020 film adaptation of his stage play, The Father, which focuses on an elderly man dealing with memory loss. The film premiered to critical acclaim at the Sundance Film Festival and was picked up for distribution by Sony Pictures Classics. It began a limited release on 26 February 2021, after originally being scheduled for release on 18 December 2020. Hopkins and Colman received widespread praise for their performances, as did the film for its accurate depiction of dementia. It received six Academy Award nominations (including Best Picture) and Colman received a nomination for the Academy Award for Best Supporting Actress.

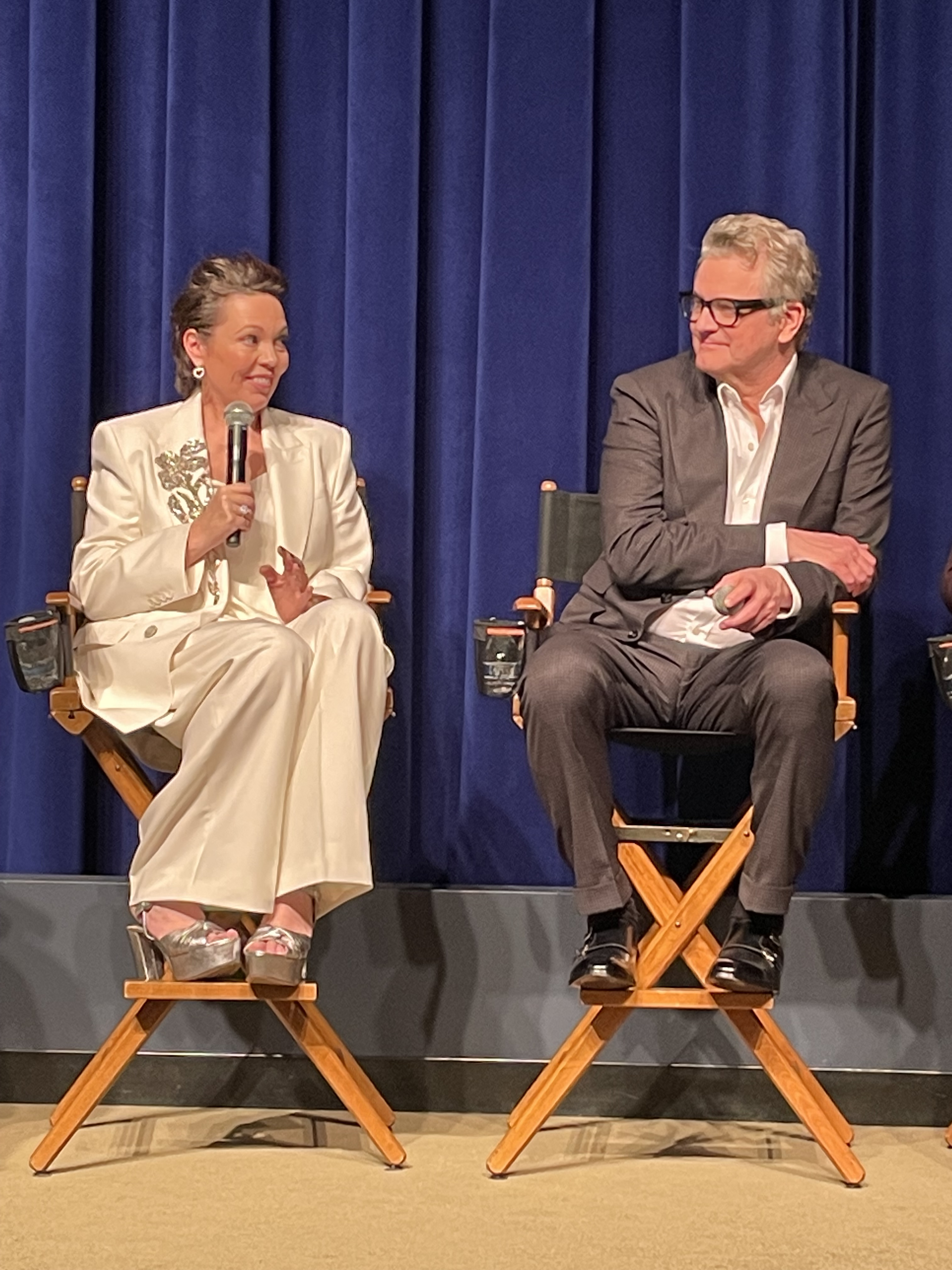
Colman and Colin Firth in 2022

In 2021, she had roles in the drama films Mothering Sunday and The Electrical Life of Louis Wain and in the animated science fiction comedy films The Mitchells vs. the Machines and Ron's Gone Wrong. Colman was executive producer and starred with David Thewlis in the HBO true-crime miniseries Landscapers created by her husband, Ed Sinclair. The series and Colman's performance were critically praised.

Colman also starred that year in Maggie Gyllenhaal's psychological drama The Lost Daughter, an adaptation of the novel of the same name by Elena Ferrante. Her performance was critically praised and she earned nominations for the Golden Globe Award for Best Actress in a Motion Picture – Drama and the Screen Actors Guild Award for Outstanding Performance by a Female Actor in a Leading Role, in addition to her second nomination for the Academy Award for Best Actress. In 2022, Colman appeared as Sarah Nelson, the mother of Kit Connor's character Nick Nelson, in the Netflix coming-of-age series Heartstopper, and received the inaugural Children's and Family Emmy Award for Outstanding Guest Performance for her performance in the first season.

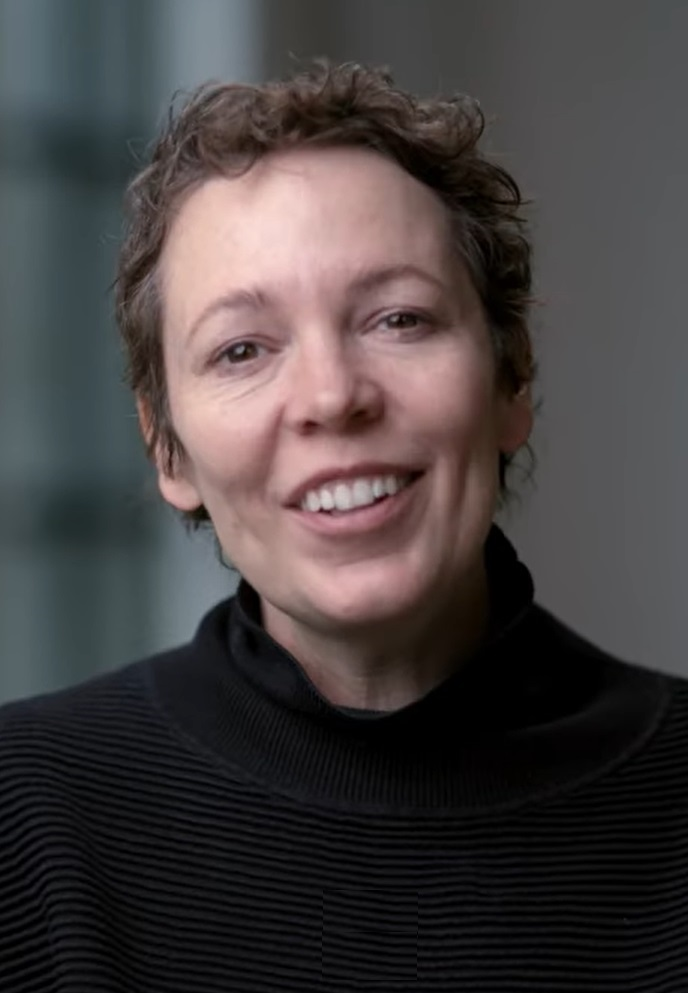
Colman at Soccer Aid for UNICEF 2024

Also in 2022, Colman starred in the coming-of-age comedy film Joyride. She played the lead role in the romantic drama film Empire of Light, directed by Sam Mendes. For her performance in the film, she earned positive reviews and her second nomination for the Golden Globe Award for Best Actress in a Motion Picture – Drama. She also had starring voice roles in the DreamWorks animated film Puss in Boots: The Last Wish and in the Netflix animated film Scrooge: A Christmas Carol.

In 2023, Colman starred as Miss Havisham in the FX / BBC period drama series Great Expectations, based on Charles Dickens' novel of the same name. She also starred as MI6 agent Sonya Falsworth in the Disney+ miniseries Secret Invasion, set in the Marvel Cinematic Universe. Colman then produced and starred in the mystery comedy film Wicked Little Letters.

Colman appeared in the musical fantasy film Wonka, which explores Willy Wonka's origins as a prequel to the Roald Dahl novel Charlie and the Chocolate Factory. In the role of Mrs. Scrubbit, she spoke with "a truly over-the-top Cockney accent". The film was released on 8 December 2023. She also reprised her role as the middle-aged Queen Elizabeth II in the final episode of the sixth season of The Crown, which was released on 14 December 2023. She appeared in seasons 2 and 3 of The Bear as Chef Andrea Terry.

Colman stars as The Reverend Mother in the live-action animated comedy Paddington in Peru (2024), the third film in the Paddington film series.

Colman starred alongside John Lithgow in the 2025 film Jimpa, directed by Australian director Sophie Hyde and filmed in South Australia, Amsterdam, and Helsinki. Lithgow plays the namesake character, gay rights and HIV/AIDS activist Jim Hyde, father of the director, while Colman plays Sophie. The film was released in US and Australian cinemas in early 2026, after premiering at Sundance on 23 January 2025.

== Philanthropy ==
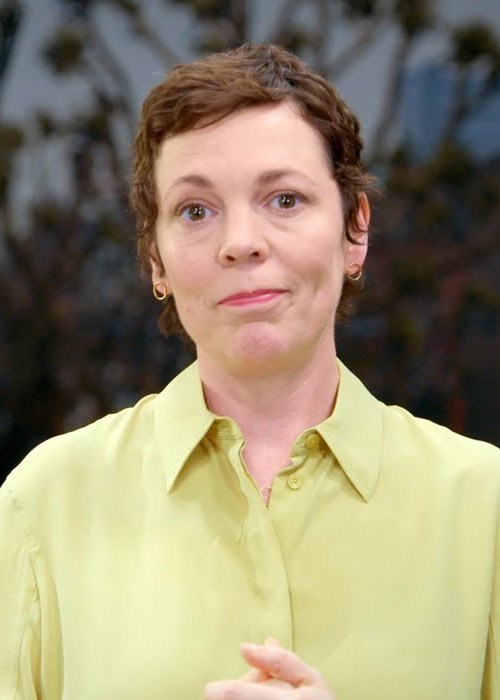
Colman speaking on behalf of UNICEF in 2019

Colman presented two of the 2013 Mind Media Awards, which celebrate accurate, responsible and sensitive portrayals of mental health across the media. Colman believes that "the media industry has huge influence and with that comes a responsibility to contest the stigma that sadly still exists, through accurate representation". She has spoken openly to the Big Issue about her experience of postnatal depression after the birth of her first child.

Inspired by her research for the film Tyrannosaur, in 2014, Colman became the patron of the UK charity Tender, which uses theatre and the arts to educate young people about preventing violence and sexual abuse. Colman has said that domestic violence prevention can make a difference in the lives of young people. Other charity work included participating in the Alzheimer's Society's Holkham Hall Memory Walk in September 2013. Colman's great-grandmother suffered from dementia and her mother was involved in running a nursing home for patients. She has also supported charity campaigns for the Marie Curie Great Daffodil Appeal for the terminally ill.

In December 2014, Colman was involved in a BBC Radio documentary about the plight of women in Afghanistan for Amnesty International UK. Several women who told their stories to journalist Lyse Doucet were unable to appear because their lives might have been at risk; Colman read their stories as part of the documentary and said that the UK must not abandon Afghan women to the Taliban. An ambassador for UNICEF UK since 2015, she became its president in 2020.

Colman became patron of the Anthony Nolan blood-cancer charity in 2018, which she said helped a friend of hers.

== Personal life ==
While performing in a 1997 production of Sir Alan Ayckbourn's Table Manners, Colman met Ed Sinclair, a third-year law student who had become disillusioned with law and preferred to write. Colman and Sinclair married in August 2001 and have three children. The couple moved from Peckham, south London, to rural Norfolk, during the COVID-19 lockdowns. Colman cited press intrusion as a factor behind the move.

The professional collaborations by the couple include the 2021 miniseries Landscapers, created and co-written by Sinclair, and the films Wicked Little Letters (2023), The Roses (2025) and Wicker (2026) they produced together; Colman played the female lead in all of these works.

Since 2013, Colman has been a judge of the Norwich Film Festival. In August 2014, she was one of 200 public figures who signed a letter to The Guardian opposing Scottish independence in the run-up to the September 2014 referendum on the issue. In an interview with The Sunday Times in November 2019 on her portrayal of Queen Elizabeth II in The Crown, Colman described herself as a "leftie monarchist", having previously been a life-long republican.

She signed an open letter in November 2020 condemning violence and discrimination against trans women.

In November 2023, Colman signed a letter that called for a ceasefire in the Gaza war.

In September 2025, she signed an open pledge with Film Workers for Palestine pledging not to work with Israeli film institutions.

In February 2026, in an interview as a part of the Jimpa press tour, Colman spoke openly about her relationship with the queer community, stating, "I suppose I am on the outside. I have a heterosexual relationship. But in the world I live in, I'm with queer community a lot." She also discussed her gender identity and how she "never felt massively feminine in [her] being female." She mentioned describing herself to her husband as "a gay man" and feeling "at ease" with the non-binary community, stating, "I've always felt sort of nonbinary. Don't make that a big sort of title!"

== Acting credits ==
=== Film ===
Key
†	Denotes films that have not yet been released

Year	Title	Role	Notes	Ref.
2004	Terkel in Trouble	Terkel's mother (voice)	UK English dub	
2005	Zemanovaload	TV Producer		
2005	One Day	Ian's Mother	Short film	
2006	Confetti	Joanna Roberts		
2007	Hot Fuzz	PC Doris Thatcher		
2007	Grow Your Own	Alice		
2007	I Could Never Be Your Woman	Hairdresser		
2007	Dog Altogether	Anita	Short film	
2009	Le Donk & Scor-zay-zee	Olivia		
2011	Tyrannosaur	Hannah		
2011	Arrietty	Homily (voice)	UK English dub	
2011	The Iron Lady	Carol Thatcher		
2011	See Me	Miss	Short film	
2012	Hyde Park on Hudson	Queen Elizabeth		
2013	I Give It a Year	Linda		
2013	Locke	Bethan Maguire (voice)		
2014	Cuban Fury	Sam Garrett		
2014	Pudsey the Dog: The Movie	Nelly the Horse (voice)		
2014	Thomas & Friends: Tale of the Brave	Marion (voice)		
2014	The Kármán Line	Sarah		
2015	The Lobster	Hotel Manager		
2015	Thomas & Friends: Sodor's Legend of the Lost Treasure	Marion (voice)		
2015	London Road	Julie		
2017	Murder on the Orient Express	Hildegard Schmidt		
2018	The Favourite	Queen Anne		
2019	Them That Follow	Hope Slaughter		
2020	The Father	Anne		
2021	The Mitchells vs. the Machines	PAL (voice)		
2021	Mothering Sunday	Mrs. Clarrie Niven		
2021	The Electrical Life of Louis Wain	Narrator (voice)		
2021	The Lost Daughter	Leda Caruso	Also executive producer	
2021	Ron's Gone Wrong	Donka Pudowski (voice)		
2022	Joyride	Joy		
2022	Empire of Light	Hilary Small		
2022	Scrooge: A Christmas Carol	Past (voice)		
2022	Puss in Boots: The Last Wish	Mama Bear (voice)		
2023	Barbie	Herself	Deleted scene	
2023	Wicked Little Letters	Edith Swan	Also producer	
2023	Wonka	Mrs. Scrubbit		
2024	Paddington in Peru	The Reverend Mother/Clarissa Cabot		
2025	Jimpa	Hannah		
2025	The Roses	Ivy Rose		
2025	The Fox	The Fox (voice)		
2026	Wicker	The Fisherwoman	Also producer	
2026	Elsinore	Dr. Margaret Johnson		

=== Television ===
Key
†	Denotes television productions that have not yet been released

Year	Title	Role	Notes
2000	Bruiser	Various characters	6 episodes
2001	The Mitchell and Webb Situation	Various characters	5 episodes
2001	People Like Us	Pamela Eliot	Episode: "The Vicar"
2001	Mr Charity	Distressed Mother	Episode: "Nice to Feed You"
2001	Comedy Lab	Linda	Episode: "Daydream Believers: Brand New Beamer"
2002	Rescue Me	Paula	Episode: "1.4"
2002	Holby City	Kim Prebble	Episode: "New Hearts, Old Scores"
2002	The Office	Helena	Episode: "Interview"
2003	Gash	Various characters	3 episodes
2003	Eyes Down	Mandy Foster	Episode: "Stars in Their Eyes"
2003	The Strategic Humour Initiative	Various characters	Television film
2003–2015	Peep Show	Sophie Chapman	32 episodes
2004	Black Books	Tanya	Episode: "Elephants and Hens"
2004	Swiss Toni	Linda Byron	Episode: "Troubleshooter"
2004	NY-LON	Lucy	Episode: "Something About Family"
2004	Coming Up	Receptionist	Episode: "The Baader Meinhoff Gang Show"
2004–2006	Green Wing	Harriet Schulenburg	18 episodes
2005	Angell's Hell	Belinda	Television film
2005	Look Around You	Pam Bachelor	6 episodes
2005	The Robinsons	Connie	Episode: "1.3"
2005	Murder in Suburbia	Ellie	Episode: "Golden Oldies"
2005	ShakespeaRe-Told	Ursula	Episode: "Much Ado About Nothing"
2006–2008	That Mitchell and Webb Look	Various characters	13 episodes
2007	The Grey Man	Linda Dodds	Television film
2007	The Time of Your Life	Amanda	6 episodes
2008	Love Soup	Penny	Episode: "Integrated Logistics"
2008	Hancock and Joan	Marion	Television film
2008	Consuming Passion: 100 Years of Mills & Boon	Janet / Violetta	Television film
2008–2009	Beautiful People	Debbie Doonan	12 episodes
2008, 2018	Would I Lie to You?	Herself	2 episodes
2009	Skins	Gina Campbell	Episode: "Naomi"
2009	Midsomer Murders	Bernice	Episode: "Small Mercies"
2009	Mister Eleven	Beth Paley	2 episodes
2010	Doctor Who	Prisoner Zero / Mother	Episode: "The Eleventh Hour"
2010–2014	Rev.	Alex Smallbone	19 episodes
2011	Comic Relief: Uptown Downstairs Abbey	O'Brien	Television film
2011	Exile	Nancy Ronstadt	3 episodes
2011–2012	Twenty Twelve	Sally Owen	10 episodes
2012	Accused	Sue Brown	Episode: "Mo's Story"
2012	Bad Sugar	Joan Cauldwell	Television film
2013–2017	Broadchurch	DS Ellie Miller	24 episodes
2013	The Suspicions of Mr Whicher: The Murder In Angel Lane	Susan Spencer	Television film
2013	Run	Carol	2 episodes
2013	The Thirteenth Tale	Margaret Lea	Television film
2013	The Five(ish) Doctors Reboot	Herself	Television film
2014	Big Ballet	Narrator	3 episodes
2014	The 7.39	Maggie Matthews	2 episodes
2014	W1A	Sally Owen	Episode: "1.4"
2014	The Secrets	Pippa	Episode: "The Dilemma"
2014	Mr. Sloane	Janet Sloane	6 episodes
2014	This is Jinsy	Joan Jenkins	Episode: "The Golden Woggle"
2014–2018	Thomas & Friends	Marion	Voice; 9 episodes
2016	Drunk History	Ethel Le Neve	Episode: "2.7"
2016	We're Going on a Bear Hunt	Mum	Voice; Television special
2016–2018	Flowers	Deborah Flowers	12 episodes
2016–2018	The Secret Life of the Zoo	Narrator	35 episodes
2016–2019	Fleabag	Godmother	9 episodes
2016–2026	The Night Manager	Angela Burr	10 episodes
2017	Inside Dior	Narrator	2 episodes
2018	Flatpack Empire	Narrator	3 episodes
2018	Natural World	Narrator	Episode: "The Super Squirrels"
2018	Watership Down	Strawberry	Voice; 4 episodes
2019	Les Misérables	Madame Thénardier	4 episodes
2019–2020, 2023	The Crown	Queen Elizabeth II	21 episodes
2020	The Simpsons	Lily	Voice; Episode: "The 7 Beer Itch"
2020	Becoming You	Narrator	6 episodes
2020	Cinderella: A Comic Relief Pantomime for Christmas	Fairy Godmother	Television special
2021	Trip Hazard: My Great British Adventure	Narrator	4 episodes
2021	Landscapers	Susan Edwards	4 episodes Also executive producer
2021	Superworm	Narrator	Television special
2022–2023	Heartstopper	Sarah Nelson	10 episodes
2022	Staged	Herself	Episode: "Knock, Knock"
2023	Great Expectations	Miss Havisham	6 episodes
2023	Secret Invasion	Sonya Falsworth	5 episodes
2023–2024	The Bear	Chef Andrea Terry	3 episodes
2025	Mitchell and Webb Are Not Helping	Lady Agatha	Episode: "1.2"
2025	The Great Christmas Bake Off	Herself	Christmas special
2026	Pride and Prejudice †	Mrs Bennet	6 episodes
TBA	Cry Wolf †	Kath	Main role Also executive producer
TBA	Army of Shadows †		Upcoming series

=== Theatre ===
Year	Title	Role	Venue
2000	Long Day's Journey into Night	Cathleen	Lyric Theatre
2009	England People Very Nice	Philippa	Royal National Theatre
2012	Hay Fever	Myra Arundel	Noël Coward Theatre
2017	Mosquitoes	Jenny	Royal National Theatre

== Awards and nominations ==
Colman has received a number of awards, including an Academy Award, a British Academy Film Award, four British Academy Television Awards, three Golden Globe Awards, two Emmy Awards, a Volpi Cup, and a BFI Fellowship. For her performance in The Night Manager (2016), she received a Golden Globe Award and was nominated for a Primetime Emmy Award. Colman received another Primetime Emmy Award nomination for Fleabag (2016–2019). For her portrayal of Queen Elizabeth II in The Crown (2019–2020), she received a Golden Globe Award and a Primetime Emmy Award.

For her portrayal of Anne, Queen of Great Britain in The Favourite (2018), she received the Academy Award for Best Actress, the Golden Globe Award for Best Actress in a Motion Picture – Musical or Comedy, and the BAFTA Award for Best Actress in a Leading Role. For her performance in The Father (2020), she was nominated for the Golden Globe Award and the Academy Award for Best Supporting Actress. For her performance in The Lost Daughter (2021), Colman was nominated for the Golden Globe Award and the Academy Award for Best Actress. She was appointed Commander of the Order of the British Empire (CBE) in the 2019 Birthday Honours for her services to drama.

== See also ==
- List of British actors
- List of Academy Award winners and nominees from Great Britain
- List of actors with Academy Award nominations
- List of actors with more than one Academy Award nomination in the acting categories
- List of LGBTQ Academy Award winners and nominees
- List of Golden Globe winners
- List of Primetime Emmy Award winners
