= Naomi (Skins) =

- Skins episode
- Episode no.: Season 3 Episode 6
- Directed by: Simon Massey
- Written by: Atiha Sen Gupta; Jack Thorne
- Original air date: 26 February 2009

Guest appearances
- Rosie Allan as Jemima; Olivia Colman as Gina Campbell; Lauretta Gavin as Dopey; Adam Jones as Naked Man; Rory Lowings as Crispin; Tom Meeten as Jesus; Ardal O'Hanlon as Kieran; Giles Thomas as Doug; Victoria Wicks as College Director

Episode chronology
← Previous "Freddie"	Next → "JJ"

"Naomi" is the sixth episode of the third series of the British teen drama Skins, which first aired on 26 February 2009 on E4 in both Ireland and the United Kingdom. The episode was written by Atiha Sen Gupta and Jack Thorne, and was directed by Simon Massey. The episode focuses on the character of Naomi Campbell (Lily Loveless) as she competes against James Cook (Jack O'Connell) in their college's elections for Student President. She enters a romantic relationship with her classmate Emily Fitch (Kathryn Prescott) while also receiving affection from her teacher Kieran (Ardal O'Hanlon).

The episode was filmed in October 2008. The weather was so cold during filming that one scene taking place in a lake had to be shortened when Prescott was taken to a standby ambulance with suspected hypothermia. "Naomi" brought in 957,000 viewers and was E4's highest-rated programme of the week. Critical reviews of the episode were generally positive.

== Plot ==
Naomi lives with her hippy mother Gina (Olivia Colman) and fifteen other people in a communal living arrangement. This is a source of annoyance to Naomi, whose privacy is invaded when she wakes up one morning, naked, to discover that a male hippy is sleeping in her bed. At college, she avoids Emily to meet with her politics teacher Kieran instead. In the students' common room, they are informed of the upcoming elections for Student President. Emily encourages Naomi to run for president, but Naomi refuses. She later comes across Cook, who tries to persuade her to have sex with him. She jokingly tells him that he has a better chance of winning the student elections, which he sees as a challenge and decides to register. Kieran walks her home at the end of the day and urges her to run in the elections, giving her a registration form. When she arrives at her house, she finds Emily waiting in her bedroom with another registration form. Emily starts to leave when Naomi is rude and standoffish to her—despite taking Emily's advice to enter the elections—but returns and confronts her. She frankly tells her that she is not obsessed with pursuing a sexual relationship with her, and Naomi suggests she stay the night with her.

The next morning, Naomi wakes up, with Emily asleep next to her. She is tempted to stroke her hair, but instead gets dressed and goes to college, leaving Emily in her bed. At college, she sees the massive presidential campaign staged by Cook and JJ (Ollie Barbieri). She launches her own campaign to rival Cook, but finds that most of her classmates' support is for Cook's anarchist ideas. She is doubly humiliated in front of the form when Cook ridicules her and Emily subsequently stands up for her. She flees to Kieran for comfort but leaves him, shocked and disgusted, when he kisses her. She goes home and, after finding a note from Emily in her bed, cries herself to sleep.

Naomi and Emily escape to the countryside later that evening and cycle to one of Emily's favourite places by a lake before sunset. After swimming in the lake, they light a campfire, and share a cannabis joint. An act of blowbacking the joint leads the two to share a kiss and they proceed to make love. Emily wakes up the following morning to find Naomi preparing to leave. She pleads with Naomi not to leave her a second time and tells her that she should accept that she needs to be loved. Naomi goes home to find Kieran in bed with her mother, and leaves for college, devastated. She sees her teachers rigging the election to prevent Cook from winning, and reveals this to the form when she is announced the winner. As his first presidential act, Cook starts a riot. In the ensuing chaos, Naomi forgives Kieran, encouraging him that if he likes her mother, he should tell her so. Naomi begins to have sex with Cook before she realises that it "isn't right". Surprisingly, Cook doesn't seem to mind, as he says that she must have a good reason not to follow through because she's clever. Naomi leaves, with her and Cook now sharing a better understanding of each other. That night, she visits Emily's house, but Emily refuses to open the door, not wanting Naomi to see her after she had been crying. They sit on opposite sides of the door, and Naomi admits that she does need somebody to love her. Emily offers her hand through the door's cat flap to Naomi, who finally reciprocates Emily's feelings.

== Production ==
"Naomi" was filmed in October 2008, in the same production block as the series' fourth episode, "Pandora", and the series' opening title sequence. The riot scene in front of the college was filmed with 100 extras; Cook's petrol-bombing of the car was described by costume assistant Ros Marshall as "probably the most hi-tech special effect we've had while filming Skins". The students' college common room was filmed in the show's production canteen. Originally, an entire scene was supposed to be filmed with Naomi and Emily in the lake, but the water was so cold that the actors were unable to stay in the water, and Kathryn Prescott was taken to a standby ambulance with suspected hypothermia. Director Simon Massey choreographed Naomi and Emily's sex scene prior to filming so that, on the set, the actions would come instinctively to the actors and they would be able to complete the scene in a limited number of takes. While Lily Loveless enjoyed filming those scenes because "stuff like that gives you experience", Prescott said that it concerned her, though she said that she was not pressured to do anything in the script that made her uncomfortable.

Stylist Kirstie Stanway began to differentiate between Emily and her twin sister Katie's hair and makeup with this episode to show that the twins are starting to "move along their own paths". She re-styled Katie's character in particular to illustrate that she is now "desperate not to be lumped with her sister as she really doesn't approve of the new girl in her life". Ardal O'Hanlon grew a beard for his role as Kieran and was given a scar under one eye to give his character a "more rugged look". Ros Marshall said that Cook's mock-presentation of himself as "Cook Guevara" paid homage to The Clash's Joe Strummer and "the youth cultures of days gone by", and that his Dr. Martens brogues were a reference to skinheads of the 1980s. Marshall made Cook and JJ's campaign rosettes by hand from Rizla rolling papers.

== Reception ==
"Naomi" drew 957,000 viewers and was E4's highest-rated programme of the week.

Sarah Warn, editor-in-chief of lesbian-based website AfterEllen.com, wrote that the episode's focus on Naomi and Emily "was one of the best-developed and most honest depictions of a lesbian teenage relationship that I've ever seen on TV." A critic for PopSugar.com thought both Naomi and Cook to be more likable after the episode and enjoyed the development of their friendship throughout. They found Emily's plea to Naomi as Naomi left the campsite "heartbreaking" and called Kieran "one of my favourite recurring characters this series". Digital Spy's Dan French gave the episode a positive review, describing it as "chaotic" and "full of lady-lovin'". He praised Naomi's relationship with Kieran, which he saw as a reference to the affair between Chris Miles, a first generation character from Skins' first and second series, and his teacher Angie. The entertainment editor for eurOut.org, a website for European lesbians, thought that Naomi and Emily's storyline was "definitely one of the best portrayals of teenage lesbians I've ever seen", writing that "when the focus is more on cute girls falling for each other, this show isn't half bad". Another eurOut.org writer, Cate O'Neil, said that "Naomi" was "probably the best individual lesbian episode I have seen on TV. Ever."
