= Jonathan Adler =

American potter, interior decorator, and author

- Born: August 11, 1966 (age 60); Bridgeton, New Jersey, U.S.
- Education: Brown University
- Occupations: Potter, interior decorator, designer, business owner
- Years active: 1990s–present
- Known for: Pottery, product design, commercial and residential interior decoration, furniture design
- Television: Top Design judge (2007–2008)
- Spouse: Simon Doonan (m. 2008)
- Website: JonathanAdler.com

Jonathan Adler (born August 11, 1966, in Bridgeton, New Jersey) is an American potter, interior decorator, and author. Adler launched his first ceramic collection in 1993 at Barneys New York. Five years later he expanded into home furnishings, opening his first namesake boutique in SoHo, Manhattan. He now has 9 stores and runs an eponymous home interiors business.

== Early life and education ==
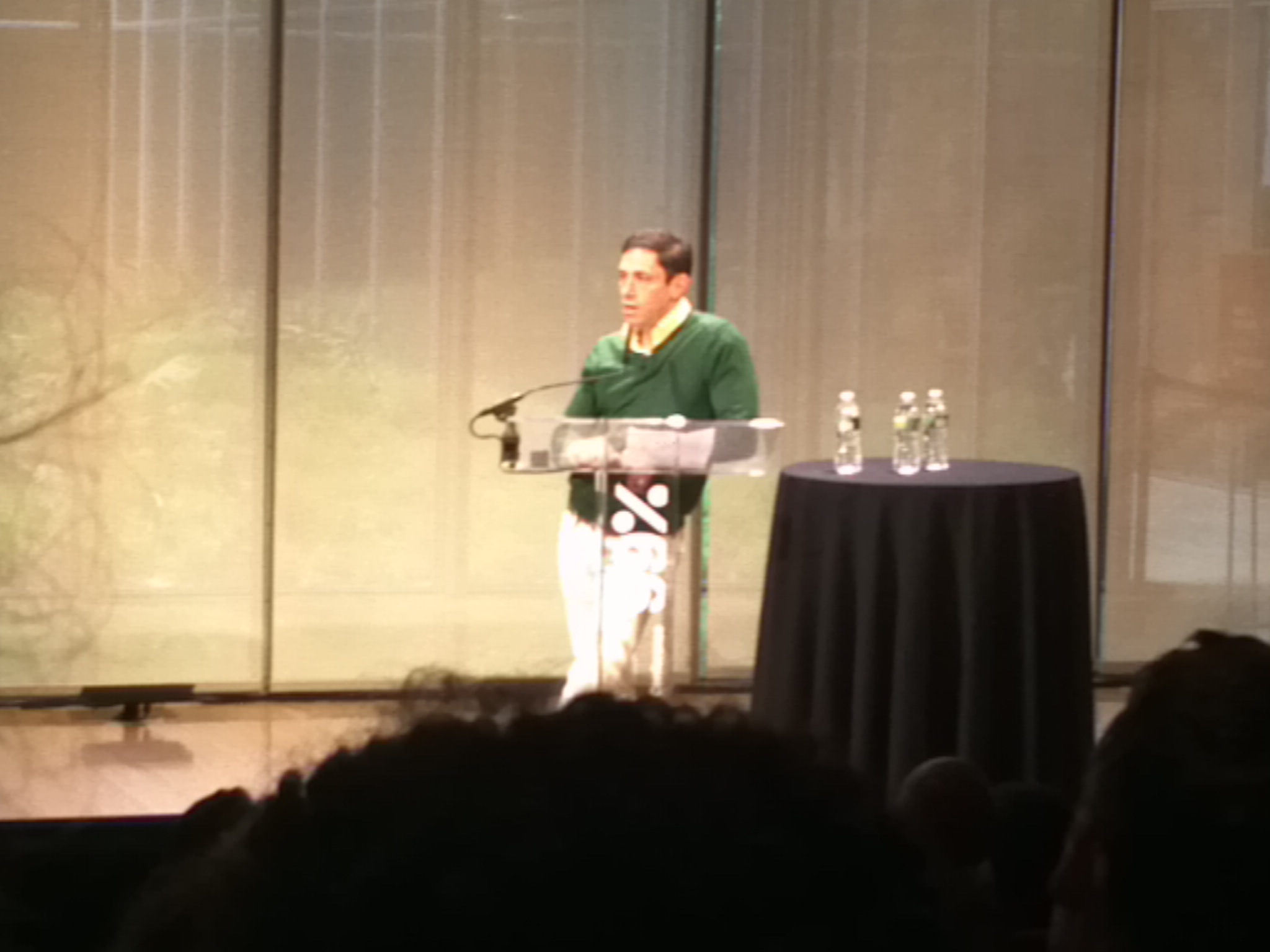
Jonathan Adler

After growing up in Bridgeton, New Jersey, Adler discovered an interest in pottery at summer camp when he was 12 years old. This interest in pottery was further enhanced by his father's own interest in pottery as a hobby he pursued in Philadelphia, while remaining in Bridgeton to practice law for a career. When Jonathan later attended Brown University, he studied semiotics and art history, but spent most of his time at the nearby Rhode Island School of Design making pots. His RISD pottery, including Chanel inspired teapots and Sevres inspired urns, reflected his interests in pop culture, early hip hop culture, contemporary art, and fashion. His professor told him: "You have no talent, you need to leave and give up on your dreams and go become a lawyer." Adler is Jewish.

== Career ==
After graduating, he spent three years as an assistant in the entertainment industry before returning to pottery. He said in a 2013 interview that "every creative person, and every craftsperson, should have a naysayer to rebel against."

In 1990, Adler started teaching classes at Mud, Sweat 'n' Tears in New York City in exchange for free studio space. With those pots on hand, he cold-called the buyers from Barneys New York, received an order, and became a full-time production potter. In 1993 he founded Jonathan Adler Enterprises LLC.

He started as a production potter, producing on his own for years. He later worked with Aid to Artisans, a non-profit organization that works to help artisans in developing countries by connecting them with decorators in America. While in Peru visiting pottery studios, he was inspired by South American textiles and started designing pillows, throws, and rugs inspired by the work he found there.

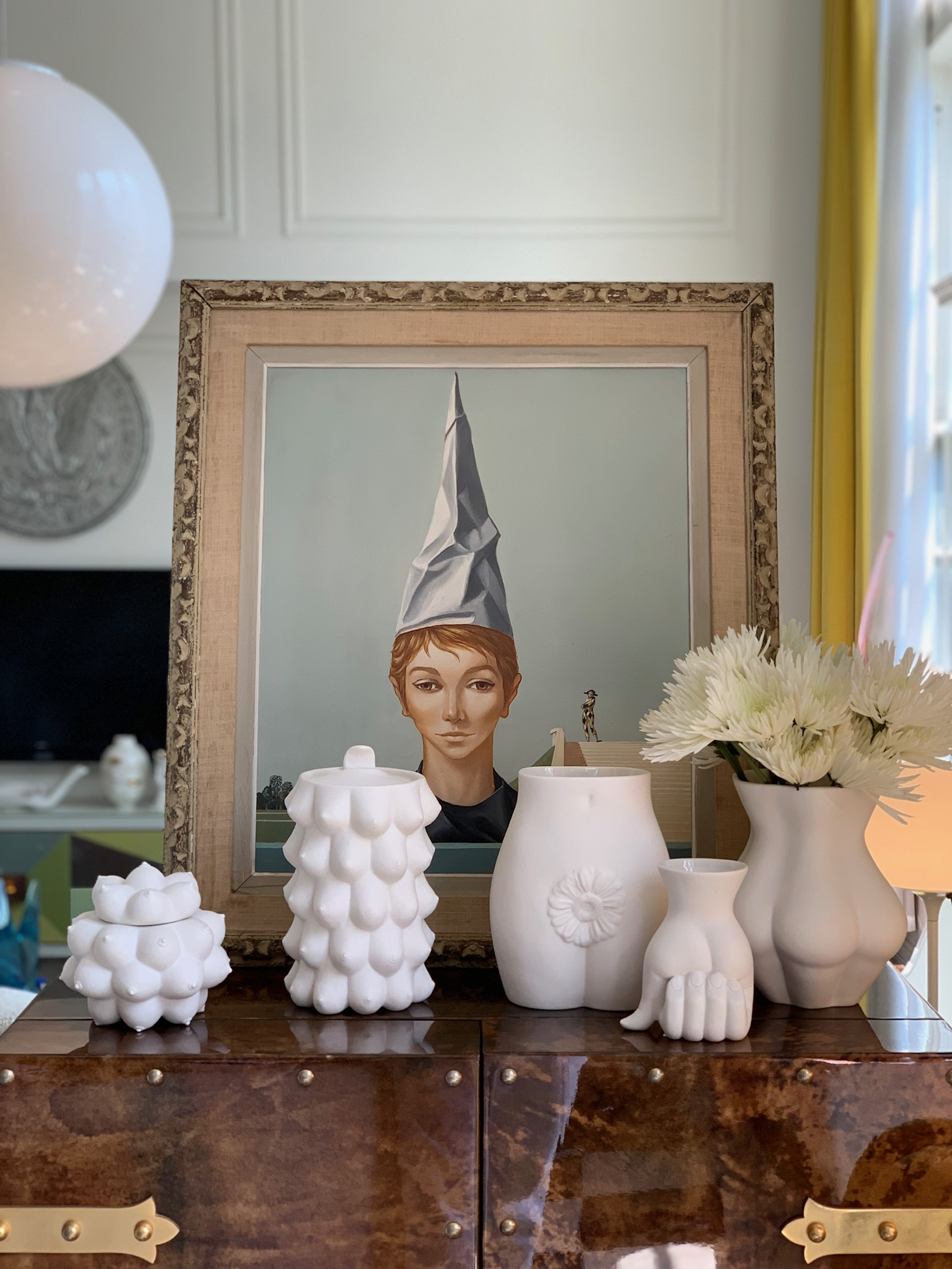
Works by Adler

Adler opened his first store in SoHo, Manhattan in 1998 and today his designs are sold in 30 stores and over 1,000 retailers. His designs include pots and sofas.

Adler has handled the interior decorator work of several commercial and residential projects. In 2004, he styled the Parker Palm Springs Hotel, the former Merv Griffin's Resort and Givenchy Spa property in Palm Springs, California. In 2016, he redesigned the hotel, extensively redoing the property including installing a seven-foot-tall bronze banana on the main lawn.

Other projects include 225 Rector Place, Abington House (on the High Line), multiple Related Property apartment designs and a 2015 overhaul of the rooms, hallways, and outdoor areas at Eau Palm Beach.

He speaks at home interior industry events and design-centric museums, such as IDS, IDS West, KBIS, and the Mint Museum. He has appeared as a guest on Good Morning America, The Oprah Winfrey Show, and several other national programs.

In 2019, Adler was asked by BMW to design BMW 8 series convertibles to be included in the WorldPride NYC Parade. His designs featured rainbow and heart designs across the cars. Adler also participated in the parade from one of the vehicles, publicity showing his support.

On February 28, 2020, Adler announced that he would be designing cabanas for the DreamWorks Water Park located at American Dream in East Rutherford, New Jersey; the water park opened on October 1, 2020, but the cabanas opened on December 9, 2020.

In 2022, Adler hosted an interior design instructional series produced by Wondrium.

On January 8, 2025, it was announced that the Jonathan Adler brand had been acquired by private equity firm Consortium Brand Partners. The sale was reported to have closed on December 23, 2024.

In 2025, the Museum of Art and Design in New York City displayed an exhibit called The Mad, MAD World of Jonathan Adler, featuring Adler's original work and the work of past artists who influenced his career. Adler referred to it as "an amazing opportunity to reflect on what I've done the last 32 years." The collection ran for about a year.

=== Design philosophy ===
In a 2015 interview with the Wall Street Journal, Adler described his design philosophy as "modern American glamour and eccentricity", emphasizing that he believes "everyone deserves a soupçon of glamour in every bit of their home". He discussed the recurring themes in his work, including mid-century modern influences blended with humor and bold color. Adler also highlighted projects such as his renovation of Le Parker Méridien Palm Springs, where he infused a sense of "swinging style" and vintage sophistication. He credited designers like Alexander Girard as major inspirations, praising their ability to create design that is "personal and chic at the same time".

== Personal life ==
In September 2008, Adler married his partner, Simon Doonan, in California. Doonan and Adler live in an apartment in Greenwich Village, and a house on Shelter Island.

Adler first publicly expressed his support for same-sex marriage in 2009, and works with various organizations to support LGBT rights. Both he and Doonan have filmed videos for Dan Savage's "It Gets Better Project".

== Published works ==
- My Prescription for Anti-depressive Living, 2005, New York: HarperCollins, ISBN 0060820535
- Jonathan Adler on Happy Chic Accessorizing, 2010, New York: Sterling Publishing, ISBN 1402774303
- Jonathan Adler on Happy Chic Colors, 2010, New York: Sterling Publishing, ISBN 1402774311
- 100 Ways to Happy Chic Your Life, 2012, York: Sterling Publishing, ISBN 1402775075

== Filmography ==
- 2007: Top Design season 1, Bravo network, judge for all ten episodes
- 2008: Top Design season 2, Bravo network, judge for all ten episodes
- 2021: Design Star: Next Gen season 1, HGTV, judge for all six episodes
