= List of awards and nominations received by Olivia Colman =

Olivia Colman awards and nominations
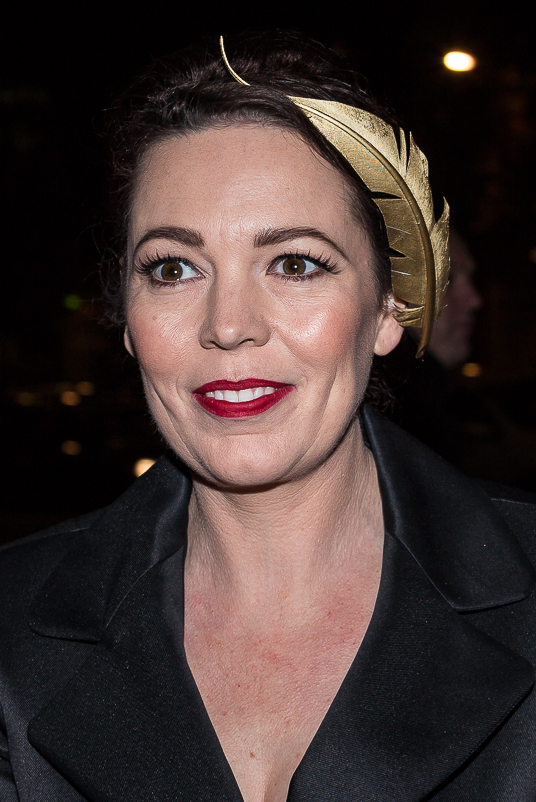
- Colman at the BIFA in 2014
Awards and nominations
Award	Wins	Nominations
Academy Awards	1	3
Actor Awards	2	8
BAFTA Awards	4	8
Critics Choice	2	8
Emmy Awards	2	8
Golden Globes	3	7

Totals (Note: Certain award groups do not simply award one winner. They acknowledge several different recipients, have runners-up, and have third place. Since this is a specific recognition and is different from losing an award, runner-up mentions are considered wins in this award tally. For simplification and to avoid errors, each award in this list has been presumed to have had a prior nomination.)
- Wins: 66
- Nominations: 156

Olivia Colman is an English actress known for her roles on stage and screen. She has received various awards and nominations, including an Academy Award, two Actor Awards, three Golden Globe Awards, a British Academy Film Award, three British Academy Television Awards, a Primetime Emmy Award, a Children's & Family Emmy Award, and two Critics' Choice Awards. She was appointed Commander of the Order of the British Empire (CBE) in the 2019 Birthday Honours for services to drama.

From 2013 to 2017, she starred in the serial crime drama series Broadchurch, for which she won the British Academy Television Award and was nominated for the International Emmy Award. Colman received critical acclaim for playing an abused charity shop worker in the British drama film Tyrannosaur (2011) earning her the BIFA for Best Actress award. During this time she portrayed Carol Thatcher in the Iron Lady (2011), and The Queen Mother in Hyde Park on Hudson (2012), and acted in her first collaboration with Yorgos Lanthimos in the black comedy The Lobster (2015), the latter of which earned her a BIFA Award. For her role in the miniseries The Night Manager (2016), she won the Golden Globe Award and was nominated for the Primetime Emmy Award. She acted in the comedy series Fleabag (2016–2019), earning a Primetime Emmy Award nomination.

She reunited with Lanthimos portraying Anne, Queen of Great Britain in the historical comedy drama film The Favourite (2018) earning the Academy Award, BAFTA Award, the BIFA Award, the Critics Choice Award, the Golden Globe Award and the Volpi Cup for Best Actress. She was also nominated for the Actor Award. For her performance as a caring daughter of her elderly parent in the drama The Father (2020), Colman was nominated for the Golden Globe Award, Actor Award, Critics' Choice Movie Award, and the Academy Award for Best Supporting Actress. For playing an unsatisfied mother in the Maggie Gyllenhaal directed psychological drama The Lost Daughter (2021), she received nominations for the Golden Globe Award, Actor Award, and Academy Award for Best Actress.

Colman portrayed of Queen Elizabeth II in seasons three and four of the Netflix historical period drama series The Crown (2019–2020), earning a Golden Globe Award for Best Actress – Television Series Drama and a Primetime Emmy Award for Outstanding Lead Actress in a Drama Series as well as two nominations for the Actor Award for Outstanding Performance by a Female Actor in a Drama Series. Colman also received the Children's and Family Emmy Award for Outstanding Guest Performance for her role in Netflix coming-of-age comedy-drama series Heartstopper (2022–present). She took a recurring guest role as a Michelin-starred head chef, Andrea Terry in the FX on Hulu dramedy series The Bear (2023–2024) for which she was nominated for two Primetime Emmy Awards for Outstanding Guest Actress in a Comedy Series.

== Major associations ==
=== Academy Awards ===
Year	Category	Work	Result	Ref.
2019	Best Actress	The Favourite	Won	
2021	Best Supporting Actress	The Father	Nominated	
2022	Best Actress	The Lost Daughter	Nominated	

=== Actor Awards ===
Year	Category	Work	Result	Ref.
2019	Outstanding Female Actor in a Leading Role	The Favourite	Nominated	
2020	Outstanding Ensemble in a Comedy Series	Fleabag	Nominated	
2020	Outstanding Female Actor in a Drama Series	The Crown (season 3)	Nominated	
2020	Outstanding Ensemble in a Drama Series	The Crown (season 3)	Won	
2021	Outstanding Ensemble in a Drama Series	The Crown (season 4)	Won	
2021	Outstanding Female Actor in a Drama Series	The Crown (season 4)	Nominated	
2021	Outstanding Female Actor in a Supporting Role	The Father	Nominated	
2022	Outstanding Female Actor in a Leading Role	The Lost Daughter	Nominated	

=== BAFTA Awards ===
Year	Category	Work	Result	Ref.
British Academy Film Awards
2019	Best Actress in a Leading Role	The Favourite	Won	
British Academy Television Awards
2012	Best Female Comedy Performance	Twenty Twelve	Nominated	
2013	Best Female Comedy Performance	Twenty Twelve	Won	
2013	Best Supporting Actress	Accused	Won	
2014	Best Actress	Broadchurch	Won	
2015	Best Female Comedy Performance	Rev.	Nominated	
2017	Best Female Comedy Performance	Fleabag	Nominated	
2022	Best Mini-Series	Landscapers	Nominated	

=== Critics' Choice Awards ===
Year	Category	Work	Result	Ref.
Critics' Choice Movie Awards
2019	Best Actress	The Favourite	Nominated	
2019	Best Actress in a Comedy	The Favourite	Won	
2019	Best Acting Ensemble	The Favourite	Won	
2021	Best Supporting Actress	The Father	Nominated	
2022	Best Actress	The Lost Daughter	Nominated	
Critics' Choice Television Awards
2016	Best Actress in a Movie/Miniseries	The Night Manager	Nominated	
2020	Best Actress in a Drama Series	The Crown (season 3)	Nominated	
2021	Best Actress in a Drama Series	The Crown (season 4)	Nominated	

=== Emmy Awards ===
Year	Category	Work	Result	Ref.
Primetime Emmy Awards
2016	Outstanding Supporting Actress in a Limited Series or Movie	The Night Manager	Nominated	
2019	Outstanding Supporting Actress in a Comedy Series	Fleabag	Nominated	
2020	Outstanding Lead Actress in a Drama Series	The Crown (episode: "Cri de Coeur")	Nominated	
2021	Outstanding Lead Actress in a Drama Series	The Crown (episode: "48:1")	Won	
2024	Outstanding Guest Actress in a Comedy Series	The Bear (episode: "Forks")	Nominated	
2025	Outstanding Guest Actress in a Comedy Series	The Bear (episode: "Forever")	Nominated	
International Emmy Awards
2014	Best Actress	Broadchurch	Nominated	
Children's and Family Emmy Awards
2022	Outstanding Guest Performance	Heartstopper	Won	

=== Golden Globe Awards ===
Year	Category	Work	Result	Ref.
2017	Best Supporting Actress – Television	The Night Manager	Won	
2019	Best Actress in a Motion Picture – Musical or Comedy	The Favourite	Won	
2020	Best Actress in a Television Series – Drama	The Crown (season 3)	Won	
2021	Best Actress in a Television Series – Drama	The Crown (season 4)	Nominated	
2021	Best Supporting Actress – Motion Picture	The Father	Nominated	
2022	Best Actress in a Motion Picture – Drama	The Lost Daughter	Nominated	
2023	Best Actress in a Motion Picture – Drama	Empire of Light	Nominated	

== Other awards and nominations ==
Year	Organisation	Category	Nominated work	Result	Ref.
2008	British Comedy Awards	Best TV Comedy Actress	Peep Show	Nominated	
2011	Sundance Film Festival	Breakout Performance	Tyrannosaur	Won	
2011	British Independent Film Awards	Best Actress	Tyrannosaur	Won	
2011	Chicago International Film Festival	Best Actress	Tyrannosaur	Won	
2011	Empire Awards	Best Actress	Tyrannosaur	Won	
2011	Evening Standard British Film Awards	Best Actress	Tyrannosaur	Won	
2011	Satellite Awards	Best Actress – Motion Picture	Tyrannosaur	Nominated	
2011	London Film Critics' Circle	British Actress of the Year	Tyrannosaur / The Iron Lady	Won	
2012	Royal Television Society	Best Actress	Accused	Won	
2012	British Comedy Awards	Best TV Comedy Actress	Rev.	Nominated	
2012	British Comedy Awards	Best TV Comedy Actress	Twenty Twelve	Nominated	
2012	British Independent Film Awards	Best Supporting Actress	Hyde Park on Hudson	Won	
2013	Royal Television Society	Best Actress	Broadchurch	Won	
2013	Crime Thriller Awards	Best Leading Actress	Broadchurch	Won	
2013	Satellite Awards	Best Actress – Television Series Drama	Broadchurch	Nominated	
2014	Broadcasting Press Guild	Best Actress	Broadchurch	Won	
2014	Monte-Carlo Television Festival	Outstanding Actress in a Miniseries	Broadchurch	Nominated	
2014	National Television Awards	Best TV Detective	Broadchurch	Nominated	
2014	UK Film Festival	Best Actress	The Karman Line	Won	
2015	TV Choice Awards	Best Actress	Broadchurch	Nominated	
2015	Evening Standard British Film Awards	Award for Comedy	The Lobster	Nominated	
2015	London Film Critics' Circle Awards	Supporting Actress of the Year	The Lobster	Nominated	
2015	British Independent Film Awards	Best Supporting Actress	The Lobster	Won	
2017	Gracie Awards	Lead Actress in a TV Movie or Limited Series	The Night Manager	Won	
2017	Satellite Awards	Best Supporting Actress – Television	The Night Manager	Won	
2018	AACTA International Awards	Best Actress	The Favourite	Won	
2018	AARP Movies for Grownup Awards	Best Actress	The Favourite	Won	
2018	AARP Movies for Grownup Awards	Bravest Performance	The Favourite	Won	
2018	Austin Film Critics Association	Best Actress	The Favourite	Won	
2018	British Independent Film Awards	Best Actress	The Favourite	Won	
2018	Chicago Film Critics Association	Best Supporting Actress	The Favourite	Won	
2018	Dallas–Fort Worth Film Critics Association	Best Actress	The Favourite	Won	
2018	Dorian Awards	Film Performance of the Year – Actress	The Favourite	Won	
2018	Detroit Film Critics Society	Best Actress	The Favourite	Nominated	
2018	European Film Award	Best European Actress	The Favourite	Won	
2018	Gijón International Film Festival	Best Actress	The Favourite	Won	
2018	Gotham Awards	Special Jury Award – Ensemble Performance (Note: (shared with Emma Stone and Rachel Weisz))	The Favourite	Won	
2018	Florida Film Critics Circle	Best Actress	The Favourite	Nominated	
2018	Georgia Film Critics Association	Best Actress	The Favourite	Nominated	
2018	Houston Film Critics Society	Best Actress	The Favourite	Won	
2018	IndieWire Critics Poll	Best Actress	The Favourite	Won	
2018	London Film Critics' Circle	Actress of the Year	The Favourite	Won	
2018	Los Angeles Film Critics Association	Best Actress	The Favourite	Won	
2018	International Cinephile Society	Best Actress	The Favourite	Nominated	
2018	New York Film Critics Online	Best Ensemble Cast	The Favourite	Won	
2018	National Society of Film Critics	Best Actress	The Favourite	Won	
2018	Palm Springs International Film Festival	Desert Palm Achievement Award	The Favourite	Won	
2018	San Francisco Film Critics Circle	Best Actress	The Favourite	Nominated	
2018	Satellite Awards	Best Actress – Motion Picture Musical or Comedy	The Favourite	Won	
2018	Satellite Awards	Best Cast – Motion Picture	The Favourite	Won	
2018	Seattle Film Critics Society	Best Actress	The Favourite	Nominated	
2018	Seattle Film Critics Society	Best Ensemble Cast	The Favourite	Nominated	
2018	St. Louis Film Critics Association	Best Actress	The Favourite	Won	
2018	Toronto Film Critics Association	Best Actress	The Favourite	Won	
2018	Vancouver Film Critics Circle	Best Actor, Female	The Favourite	Won	
2018	Venice International Film Festival	Volpi Cup for Best Actress	The Favourite	Won	
2018	Washington D.C. Area Film Critics Association Awards	Best Actress	The Favourite	Nominated	
2018	Women Film Critics Circle	Best Actress	The Favourite	Won	
2018	Women Film Critics Circle	Best Comedic Actress	The Favourite	Won	
2018	Women Film Critics Circle	Women's Work / Best Ensemble	The Favourite	Nominated	
2019	Satellite Awards	Best Supporting Actress – Television	Fleabag	Won	
2020	Zurich Film Festival	Golden Eye Award	The Father	Won	
2020	Greater Western New York Film Critics Association	Best Supporting Actress	The Father	Nominated	
2020	Indiana Film Journalists Association	Best Supporting Actress	The Father	Nominated	
2020	Sunset Film Circle Awards	Best Supporting Actress	The Father	Nominated	
2020	Satellite Awards	Best Supporting Actress – Motion Picture	The Father	Nominated	
2020	Satellite Awards	Best Actress – Television Series Drama	The Crown	Nominated	
2021	Satellite Awards	Best Actress – Television Series Drama	The Crown	Won	
2021	AACTA International Awards	Best Supporting Actress	The Father	Won	
2021	Austin Film Critics Association	Best Supporting Actress	The Father	Won	
2021	Columbus Film Critics Association	Best Supporting Actress	The Father	2nd place	
2021	Bruin Film Society Awards	Best Supporting Actress	The Father	Nominated	
2021	Chicago Indie Critics Awards	Best Supporting Actress	The Father	Nominated	
2021	Dallas-Fort Worth Film Critics Association Awards	Best Supporting Actress	The Father	Nominated	
2021	Denver Film Critics Society	Best Supporting Actress	The Father	Nominated	
2021	Detroit Film Critics Society	Best Supporting Actress	The Father	Nominated	
2021	DiscussingFilm Critic Awards	Best Supporting Actress	The Father	Nominated	
2021	Dorian Awards	Film Performance of the Year - Supporting Actress	The Father	Nominated	
2021	Georgia Film Critics Association	Best Supporting Actress	The Father	Nominated	
2021	Hollywood Critics Association	Best Supporting Actress	The Father	Nominated	
2021	Houston Film Critics Society	Best Supporting Actress	The Father	Nominated	
2021	Iowa Film Critics Awards	Best Supporting Actress	The Father	Nominated	
2021	Latino Entertainment Journalists Association Film Award	Best Supporting Actress	The Father	Nominated	
2021	Music City Film Critics' Association	Best Supporting Actress	The Father	Nominated	
2021	North Carolina Film Critics Association	Best Supporting Actress	The Father	Nominated	
2021	Online Film & Television Association	Best Supporting Actress	The Father	Nominated	
2021	Phoenix Critics Circle	Best Supporting Actress	The Father	Nominated	
2021	San Francisco Bay Area Film Critics Circle Awards	Best Supporting Actress	The Father	Nominated	
2021	Seattle Film Critics Society	Best Supporting Actress	The Father	Nominated	
2021	St. Louis Film Critics Association Awards	Best Supporting Actress	The Father	Nominated	
2021	Toronto Film Critics Association	Best Supporting Actress	The Father	Nominated	
2021	Washington D.C. Area Film Critics Association Awards	Best Supporting Actress	The Father	Nominated	
2021	Sunset Film Circle Awards	Best Actress	The Lost Daughter	Nominated	
2021	Satellite Awards	Best Actress – Motion Picture Drama	The Lost Daughter	Nominated	
2021	Utah Film Critics Association	Best Actress	The Lost Daughter	Nominated	
2021	Washington D.C. Area Film Critics Association Awards	Best Actress	The Lost Daughter	Nominated	
2022	Alliance of Women Film Journalists	Best Actress	The Lost Daughter	Won	
2022	Gotham Awards	Outstanding Lead Performance (tied with Frankie Faison)	The Lost Daughter	Won	
2022	Kansas City Film Critics Circle	Best Actress	The Lost Daughter	Won	
2022	London Film Critics' Circle	Actress of the Year	The Lost Daughter	Won	
2022	Online Film Critics Society	Best Actress	The Lost Daughter	Won	
2022	San Francisco Bay Area Film Critics Circle Awards	Best Actress	The Lost Daughter	Won	
2022	Toronto Film Critics Association	Best Actress	The Lost Daughter	Won	
2022	Women Film Critics Circle	Worst Screen Mom of the Year	The Lost Daughter	Won	
2022	Columbus Film Critics Association	Best Actress	The Lost Daughter	2nd place	
2022	Dallas-Fort Worth Film Critics Association Awards	Best Actress	The Lost Daughter	2nd place	
2022	Iowa Film Critics Association	Best Actress	The Lost Daughter	2nd place	
2022	Alliance of Women Film Journalists	Most Daring Performance	The Lost Daughter	Nominated	
2022	Austin Film Critics Association	Best Actress	The Lost Daughter	Nominated	
2022	Chicago Film Critics Association Awards	Best Actress	The Lost Daughter	Nominated	
2022	Chicago Indie Critics Awards	Best Actress	The Lost Daughter	Nominated	
2022	DiscussingFilm Critic Awards	Best Film Actress	The Lost Daughter	Nominated	
2022	Dublin Film Critics' Circle Awards	Best Actress	The Lost Daughter	Nominated	
2022	Greater Western New York Film Critics Association	Best Actress	The Lost Daughter	Nominated	
2022	Houston Film Critics Society	Best Actress	The Lost Daughter	Nominated	
2022	Music City Film Critics Association	Best Actress	The Lost Daughter	Nominated	
2022	North Carolina Film Critics Association	Best Actress	The Lost Daughter	Nominated	
2022	Las Vegas Film Critics Society	Best Actress	The Lost Daughter	Nominated	
2022	Phoenix Critics Circle	Best Actress	The Lost Daughter	Nominated	
2022	San Diego Film Critics Society Awards	Best Actress	The Lost Daughter	Nominated	
2022	St. Louis Film Critics Association Awards	Best Actress	The Lost Daughter	Nominated	
2022	Vancouver Film Critics Circle	Best Actress	The Lost Daughter	Won	
2022	Las Vegas Film Critics Society	Best Actress	Empire of Light	Nominated	
2023	National Film Awards UK	Best Actress	Empire of Light	Won	
2026	Stockholm International Film Festival	Stockholm Achievement Award	For distinguished acting career	Honoured	
