= Simon Doonan =

British businessman

- Born: 1952 (age 73–74); Reading, Berkshire, England
- Occupations: Fashion designer, television personality, writer
- Spouse: Jonathan Adler (m. 2008)

Simon Doonan (born 1952) is a British-born United States-based author, television personality, and the former Creative Director of Barneys New York.

== Biography ==
A native of Reading, Berkshire, England, the son of Betty and Terry Doonan, Simon Doonan's first retail job was a summer position at Heelas, a department store in Reading, now owned by the John Lewis Partnership. After returning to work at the same store after university, he first got involved in the art of window dressing. He later left Reading for London and dressed windows at Aquascutum before moving to Nutters of Savile Row.

Invited to dress his windows by the proprietor of Maxfield, a department store in Los Angeles, Doonan moved to the United States in 1978. In 1984, he designed the gallery scene for the hit movie Beverly Hills Cop. In 1985, he worked for Diana Vreeland at the Costume Institute of the Metropolitan Museum. He joined the Barneys staff in 1986 as a window dresser. His windows became a tourist attraction in New York City. He continued to work for Barneys NY until it closed in 2019. He was awarded the prestigious CFDA award for his work at Barneys. In 2011 he received a Lifetime Achievement Award from The Fashion Institute of Technology.

While working at Barneys he consulted on various other projects including The Warhol Look exhibit at The Whitney Museum in 1997 and the Christie's auction of the estate of Marilyn Monroe in 2000. He helped decorate the White House for the first Obama Christmas in 2009. In 1998, Callaway/Viking published his memoir Confessions of a Window Dresser. This began his writing career. In addition to writing books, he has written regular columns for The New York Observer and Slate. In 2008, his second memoir, Beautiful People, became a BBC TV series starring Olivia Colman, Layton Williams and Luke Ward-Wilkinson.

== Personal life ==
In September 2008, he married ceramicist and designer Jonathan Adler in California. They currently reside in Florida and Shelter Island, New York with their rescue terrier FoxyLady.

== In media ==
- VH1's I Love the series, offering social commentary on each decade.
- America's Next Top Model seasons 2, 3, and 5 to teach the models about style.
- Bravo's Fashion Hunters (to authenticate an Issey Miyake piece)
- NBC show Making It hosted by Amy Poehler and Nick Offerman
- Iron Chef America for Battle Sparkling Wine.
- The Moth podcasts on which he read "Fear of Squat" on 20 September 2006 and "Every Expense was Spared" on 9 February 2012 about his wedding to Adler.
- Gossip Girl's fifth season (third episode: "The Jewel of Denial"), he escorted Blair Waldorf on Jenny Packham's show.
- Doonan's memoir Beautiful People was adapted for television and 12 episodes were broadcast BBC Two in the UK from 2008 until 2009 as Beautiful People.
- Doonan used to dress up as Elizabeth II and impersonate her at public appearances and has written about being born in the same year as Elizabeth's accession to the throne (1952) and his affinity with Elizabeth's pet name, "Brenda".
- In January 2013, Doonan made a cameo in an Alexander Wang advertisement which takes place in Wang's flagship store in New York. Doonan is falsely accused by Anjelah Johnson's character Bon Qui Qui of trying to steal a handbag.

== See also ==
- Savile Row
- Beautiful People

== Bibliography ==
- Confessions of a Window Dresser: Tales from the Life of Fashion (2001) ISBN 0-14-100362-6 (Memoir)
- Wacky Chicks: Life Lessons from Fearlessly Inappropriate and Fabulously Eccentric Women (2005) Simon & Schuster ISBN 0-7432-5789-8
- Beautiful People (also published as Nasty: My Family and Other Glamorous Varmints) (2005) ISBN 978-0-00-726954-9
- Eccentric Glamour: Creating an Insanely More Fabulous You (2008) Simon & Schuster ISBN 1-4165-3543-8
- Gay Men Don't Get Fat (2012) Blue Rider Press ISBN 978-0-399-15873-5
- The Asylum: True Tales of Madness From a Life in Fashion (2015) Blue Rider Press ISBN 978-0-399-17371-4
- Soccer Style: The Magic and Madness (2018) Laurence King Publishing ISBN 978-1-786-27202-7
- DRAG: The Complete Story (2019) Laurence King Publishing ISBN 978-1-78627-423-6
- How To Be Yourself: Life-Changing Advice From a Reckless Contrarian (2020) Phaidon Press ISBN 978-1-83866-141-0
- Keith Haring (Lives of Artists) (2021) Laurence King Publishing ISBN 978-1-78627-787-9
- Transformer: A Story of Glitter, Glam Rock, and Loving Lou Reed (2022) HarperOne ISBN 978-0-06-325951-5
