= The Christmas Miracle of Jonathan Toomey =

2007 British film directed by Bill Clark

- Directed by: Bill Clark
- Written by: Bill Clark
- Produced by: Philippe Martinez
- Starring: Tom Berenger; Joely Richardson; Lia Williams; Jenny O'Hara; Ronald Pickup
- Production company: Formula Films
- Release date: 2007
- Country: United Kingdom
- Language: English
- Budget: $8 million

The Christmas Miracle of Jonathan Toomey is a 2007 British film scripted and directed by Bill Clark. It was adapted from a 1995 book of the same name, written by Susan Wojciechowski and illustrated by P. J. Lynch.

== Plot ==
Jonathan Toomey is a woodcarver known throughout the village for his skill but also for his solemn, joyless demeanor; bereaved by the past loss of his wife and child to illness, he is known to the village children as "Mr. Gloomy" and lives alone on the edge of town.

In early December, a newly arrived widow named McDowell and her young son, Thomas, commission Jonathan for a Nativity Scene figurine set to replace a lost heirloom. Jonathan gruffly takes the job, but rebuffs her desire to have them ready by Christmas, finding the occasion "pish-posh". The next week, McDowell and Thomas arrive with the latter begging to watch him work while the mother knits; Jonathan begrudgingly allows this, so long as they are quiet. This becomes a regular occurrence, with McDowell bringing baked goods and a wreath for Jonathan. Thomas occasionally offers instructions to Jonathan, who becomes fond of the visitors and accepts to teach the boy how to carve. However, Jonathan still shows reservations, forbidding McDowell from sitting in a rocking chair or using a special embroidered cloth from his drawer on the table, both of which had belonged to his late wife.

Having completed an angel, two sheep, a cow, the three Wise Men, and Joseph by Christmas Eve, all that is left are the carvings of Mary and the infant Jesus. Jonathan still makes no promises of finishing the set in time, but is touched by the gifts of a warm scarf from McDowell and a carved robin from Thomas. He struggles through the night, finally allowing himself to grieve; using the likeness his late wife and child for Mary and Jesus, Jonathan is able complete the set and personally deliver it on Christmas Morning. He then joins McDowell and Thomas in joyfully attending the morning service, no longer "Mr. Gloomy" in the eyes of the village children.

== Film ==
The 91-minute film directed by Bill Clark starred Tom Berenger, Joely Richardson, Saoirse Ronan and Luke Ward-Wilkinson. Among other casts were Benjamin Eli, Jack Montgomery and Jenny O'Hara. It played at eight film festivals including the Gloria Film Festival at Salt Lake City where it was named "Best Film – 2007". It was released on DVD in the US later that year, in the UK and the Netherlands 2008, and in Germany 2011. In December 2015 it received its national UK TV premier on C5.

== Book ==
The 32-page children's picture book was written by Susan Wojciechowski, illustrated by P. J. Lynch, and published by Walker Books in 1995 (ISBN 978-0-7445-4007-9). One newspaper called it "the story of a gloomy woodcutter who gradually recovers his ability to find joy in life" and reported sales in the United States exceeding one million copies. For his part in that collaboration, Lynch won the annual Kate Greenaway Medal from the Library Association, recognising the year's best children's book illustration by a British subject. According to the retrospective citation, woodcarver Toomey accepts the job of creating nativity figurines for a widow and her son, and thereby resolves long-held grief for his own wife and child.

Walker's American division Candlewick Press published a U.S. edition within the calendar year (Library of Congress Classification PZ7.W8183 Ch 1995; ISBN 978-1-56402-320-9). An audiobook narrated by James Earl Jones was nominated for the Grammy Award for Best Spoken Word Album for Children in 2001.

== See also ==
- List of Christmas films
