= Paradise Lost in Cyberspace =

Radio 4 science fiction comedy

Paradise Lost In Cyberspace was a six-episode science-fiction comedy series broadcast on BBC Radio 4 in 1998.

== Plot ==
Set in 30th-century Britain, the film depicts a society where people are subjected to compulsory euthanasia at the age of 70 following the collapse of the pension system. George Smith, a 69-year-old man, is mistakenly scheduled for euthanasia a year early. He goes on the run and joins Andrea Sunbeam, a bounty hunter, eventually meeting Mrs Cookson, the leader of the Old Age Paramilitaries, a group of elderly anarchists.

The group has developed a weapon capable of destroying the computer system of Central Admin, the authority enforcing the euthanasia policy. After being given a new face and equipment, George is tasked with using the weapon to bring down the system.

== Cast ==
- Stephen Moore as George
- Patsy Byrne as Doris
- Geoffrey McGivern as O'Connoll
- Lorelei King as Andrea Sunbeam
- Edna Doré as Mrs Cookson
- Melanie Hudson as Wilma P Random / Dawkins
- Christopher Douglas as Dave Lusterheusen / Ronnie / Brian Kettle

== Crew ==
- written by Colin Swash

== Episodes and broadcast dates ==
Episode #	Original Air Date
1	February 24, 1998
2	March 3, 1998
3	March 10, 1998
4	March 17, 1998
5	March 24, 1998
6	March 31, 1998
