= JJ (Skins series 3) =

- Skins episode
- JJ tricks Cook into taking his prescription drugs.
- Episode no.: Season 3 Episode 7
- Directed by: Charles Martin
- Written by: Bryan Elsley
- Original air date: 5 March 2009

Guest appearances
- Seth Adams as Nurse Seth; Jiggy Bhore as Margie; Matthew Cann as Kid 1; Juliet Cowan as Cecilia Jones; Charlie Goodwin as Kid 3; Chris "Fagin" Lynd as Northern Scum; Roland Oliver as Model Shop Owner; Paul Ridley as Dr Felly; Joel Rowbottom as Kid 2; "The Slasher" as Northern Scum; Sevven Smith as Kid 4; Toby "Ziegler" Welch as Northern Scum

Episode chronology
← Previous "Naomi"	Next → "Effy"

"JJ" is the seventh episode of the third series of the British teen drama Skins, which first aired on 5 March 2009 on E4 in both Ireland and the United Kingdom. The episode was written by the series' co-creator, Bryan Elsley, and was directed by Charles Martin. The episode focuses on the character of JJ Jones (Ollie Barbieri), who has Asperger syndrome, and his confusion about his life and his desire to be normal. He strikes up a friendship with Emily Fitch (Kathryn Prescott) and attempts to solve the dispute between his friends James Cook (Jack O'Connell) and Freddie McClair (Luke Pasqualino) over their shared love interest, Effy Stonem (Kaya Scodelario).

"JJ" was filmed in November 2008. Barbieri undertook various measures to get into his character's mindset, including research, creating part of the set himself, and later destroying it. The episode featured numerous cameo appearances by the series' crew members. "JJ" drew just under one million viewers on its first broadcast and was E4's highest-rated programme of the week. It was received generally well by critics, though the writers' decision for Emily to have sex with JJ drew criticism from the lesbian community.

== Plot ==
JJ visits his psychiatrist, Dr Felly (Paul Ridley), seeking help for his recent bouts of rage and his confusion about his life and friends. Dr Felly has poor advice for JJ and prescribes him more drugs to calm him down. As he is leaving, he meets Emily, who came to the clinic to receive counselling in being more honest, but was simply prescribed the same drugs as JJ. She comes out to him and he shares with her his longing to be "normal" for a day so that he could lose his virginity and reunite Freddie and Cook. She advises him to just ask for the things he wants, so they visit Freddie to tell him to make up with Cook. At Freddie's house, though, they walk in on Freddie having sex with Emily's twin sister, Katie (Megan Prescott), and JJ accidentally outs Emily as a lesbian, leaving Katie looking visibly shaken. JJ asks Freddie to make up with Cook, but Freddie refuses and tells JJ to choose between him and Cook.

Returning home, JJ sees his mother, Cecilia (Juliet Cowan), overwhelmed by all of his issues and blames himself. He calls Cook to tell him how he feels, but Cook is preoccupied with having sex with a girl who JJ assumes is Effy. When he visits Effy, however, she reveals that she has not seen Cook in days. He asks her to leave Freddie and Cook alone; she refuses but offers to be his friend. JJ then visits Cook and discovers that he is having sex with their friend Pandora Moon (Lisa Backwell). Pretending not to have seen this, he then confronts Cook about ruining their friendship with Freddie and shouts at Cook for not caring about how he feels. Cook gives JJ a hug and promises that he'll always care about him. He brings JJ with him to buy drugs. They are almost arrested and, after running from the police, JJ pressures Cook into taking his prescription drugs instead before they meet their friends at a club. In the queue, Effy tells Naomi Campbell (Lily Loveless) that she knows about Naomi and Emily's relationship. Naomi reveals that she is unsure of her sexuality and realises that Effy is in love with Freddie, not Cook. JJ and Cook arrive and Thomas Tomone (Merveille Lukeba) lets them into the club where British electronica duo You Love Her Coz She's Dead are playing, announcing that Emily is already inside. Cook gets into a fight on the dancefloor and Freddie moves in to help when he discovers that JJ gave Cook his prescription drugs.

Cook, under the influence of JJ's drugs, is compelled to tell the truth and confesses that Effy loves Freddie. Cook says that he loves Effy, but knows his feelings are not reciprocated and that is why he is having an affair with Pandora. Thomas, Pandora's boyfriend, overhears this and is furious. JJ leaves the club and finds a tearful Emily, who does not want to go home to face Katie. JJ invites her to spend the night with him and, after they agree to be friends, Emily invites him to have sex with her and lose his virginity. JJ's mother meets Emily the next morning and watches them discuss the night before. She is overjoyed that he has made a real friend and believes that JJ will be alright after all.

== Production ==
"JJ" was filmed in November 2008 in the same production block as the series' eighth episode, "Effy". Ollie Barbieri did some research to help him in playing JJ, who has Asperger syndrome. He said that, in initial episodes, he played JJ as "quite mad and I jumped around a lot", though by this episode his portrayal was "watered down a bit". Charles Martin shot an unscripted scene that involved Barbieri destroying the set of JJ's bedroom; Martin believed this would help Barbieri to get into JJ's mindset. Barbieri was also able to learn more about his character by creating the collage in JJ's room himself, in which JJ has tried to organise his thoughts about his friends and his life. Martin said that he and Barbieri had a "very involved director-actor relationship" and that he enjoyed "JJ" the most out of all the episodes he directed in the series. According to runner Laurence Wigfield, JJ's clinic was described in the script as "a desolate shabby place, the kind of place you went to die", with the bracketed suggestion of Fishponds Studio, where the Skins offices are. Though Wigfield initially "couldn't believe" this, the studio was used for filming the scene, which Wigfield admitted "worked quite well". The scene in which JJ and Emily bond after meeting at the clinic was filmed in Bristol's Brandon Hill Park, near Cabot Tower.

Skins' assistant director, Seth Adams, had a cameo appearance as a nurse at JJ's clinic, while floor runner Tom Meakin featured in a minor role as a policeman. The men who fight with Cook at the club were played by members of the Skins crew, Chris "Fagin" Lynd, Toby "Ziegler" Welch and "The Slasher". The show's location manager appeared in a non-speaking role as a mental patient being pushed in a wheelchair at the psychological clinic. The episode's soundtrack comprises mostly piano works composed by Claude Debussy and recorded by David McGuinness. This was the result of a suggestion made by Bryan Elsley for Debussy's music to accompany an entire episode.

== Reception ==
"JJ" brought in 997,000 viewers and was E4's highest-rated programme of the week with an audience share of 4.8 percent. Another 325,000 viewers watched the episode an hour after its initial broadcast on E4's timeshift channel, E4+1.

"JJ" was received generally positive reviews from mainstream critics. One critic for PopSugar.com "love[d]" JJ's friendship with Emily and his mother's smile at the end of the episode, which they felt was "a touching moment to end with". They credited Cook's likableness, in spite of the character's flaws, to O'Connell's "great" acting. Ellie Newton-Syms of InJournalism Magazine wrote that "digging into slightly deeper issues is what Skins is good at" and "there is clearly lots left to be revealed", as signified by Cook's drug-induced revelation that he has "nothing". Digital Spy's Dan French reviewed the episode positively, finding JJ to be a "lovable" character. He considered Cook's confession that Effy truly loves Freddie and the revelation of Cook's affair with Pandora to be "shocking". Fergus Shiel of The Sydney Morning Herald called "JJ" a "top episode", praising its portrayal of "teenage uncertainty that pack[s] an emotional punch".

The episode drew criticism from the lesbian community, however. Kate Murray of lesbian-based website AfterEllen.com regarded Emily's willingness to have sex with JJ as the use of a "classic and highly offensive stereotype" and felt that this "undermine[d] what it means to be a lesbian". She thought that the episode fell short of the previous episode, "Naomi", which focused on Emily and Naomi's relationship, suggesting that this could be because "Naomi" was written by a 19-year-old female, Atiha Sen Gupta, while "JJ" was written by Elsley, a 47-year-old male. The entertainment editor for eurOut.org, a website for European lesbians, was critical of the episode, writing, "Welcome to the wonderful world of television, where being a lesbian and sleeping with men always goes hand in hand." She did believe, however, that Emily's coming out to JJ was "very funny" and Effy's nonchalance about Naomi's sexuality was "cool".

== See also ==
- List of autistic fictional characters
