= Edna Doré =

British actress

- Doré as Mo Butcher in EastEnders
- Born: Edna Lillian Gorring; 31 May 1921; Bromley, Kent, England
- Died: 11 April 2014 (aged 92); Sussex, England
- Occupation: Actress
- Years active: 1960–2011
- Television: EastEnders (1988–1990); Eyes Down (2003–2004)
- Spouse: Alexander Doré (m. 1946; died 2002)
- Children: 1

Edna Lillian Doré (née Gorring; 31 May 1921 – 11 April 2014) was a British actress. She was known for her bit-part roles in sitcoms and for playing the character of Mo Butcher in EastEnders from 1988 to 1990.

== Career ==
Doré began her career as a chorus girl in ENSA, then joined the wartime company of Phyllis Dixey at the Whitehall Theatre as a dancer. She later spent 17 years in repertory theatre before becoming a member of the National Theatre for 10 years, especially remembered for her roles in productions directed by Bill Bryden, such as The Mysteries. She turned to television acting in 1960 and had parts in many successful series, including Dixon of Dock Green, Doctor in the House, The Liver Birds, Terry and June, Tenko, Z-Cars, and Open All Hours.

In 1988, she starred in Mike Leigh's film High Hopes, for which she received the award for Best Supporting Player at the 1989 European Film Awards. Here, she played Mrs. Bender, who suffers from the early stages of Alzheimer's disease. That year, she was cast in the BBC soap opera EastEnders, where she played Mo Butcher, the battleaxe mother of Mike Reid's character, Frank Butcher. During her time in the show, she received wide acclaim for her portrayal of an elderly lady's descent into Alzheimer's disease. The story—about the effect that Alzheimer's has on the sufferer's family—had to be curtailed when Doré decided to leave the programme in 1990. The character was killed off at the end of 1992. In 1997, she played Kath in Nil by Mouth. Other film credits include Tube Tales (1999), Weak at Denise (2001) and All or Nothing (2002).

In later years, she had parts in many television shows, including: Love Hurts (1992), A Year in Provence (1993), Casualty (1987; 1993;1997), Men Behaving Badly (1997), Peak Practice (2000), Holby City (2001), Time Gentlemen Please (2000–2002), The Bill (2002; 2003 & 2006), Eyes Down (2003–2004), Murder in Mind (2003), My Family (2004), All About George (2005), Hotel Babylon (2006) and Doctors (2006). She played the role of Maeve in the Doctor Who episode "Fear Her" in June 2006.

In September 2006, she appeared in the comedy show That Mitchell and Webb Look, and in April 2007, she appeared as a guest star in ITV's Diamond Geezer, playing the role of Violet. On 24 December 2008, she appeared in the Christmas special of Gavin & Stacey as Edna, Pete Sutcliffe's (Adrian Scarborough) mother, again playing a character affected by dementia. In February 2009, she held a small role in an episode of Minder. She also played Grace in Skellig. In January 2010, she appeared as Nin Gallagher, the grandmother of Frank Gallagher, in the series Shameless. The same year, she appeared in Mike Leigh's film Another Year. In March 2011, she appeared in an episode of Midsomer Murders.

=== Radio ===
Doré was also a radio actor. She was heard in Bringing Eddie Home by John Peacock, based on a true story of the fight by East End couple Edna and Jack Wallace to have their son's body brought home from Aden, and the ensuing fight for the rights of British servicepeople. In February and March 1998, Doré appeared in the BBC Radio 4 series Paradise Lost in Cyberspace. In her final radio role, she played Alice in A Telegram from the Queen, broadcast in 2011.

== Personal life ==
Doré lived in Barnes. She married actor, stage director and writer Alexander Doré in 1946 in St Pancras, London and was with him until his death in 2002. Her son, Michael Doré, owns a pub in Hampshire. Doré studied acting with Anna Wing, known for playing Lou Beale in EastEnders. Doré died on 11 April 2014 at the age of 92, from emphysema.

== Filmography ==
Year	Title	Role	Notes
1959	More Deadly Than the Male	Ruth LeFol	
1960	Jungle Street	Mrs. Collins	
1961	The Wind of Change	Edie	
1988	High Hopes	Mrs Bender	
1997	Nil by Mouth	Kath	
1998	Les Misérables	Old Woman	
1999	Tube Tales	Bag Lady	segment: "My Father the Liar"
1999	Weak at Denise	Iris	
2001	Goodbye Charlie Bright	Miss Saville	
2002	All or Nothing	Martha	
2003	Eyes Down	Mary Hardcastle	
2009	44 Inch Chest	Archie's Mum	
2010	Another Year	Allotment Lady	
