= Stephen Moore (actor) =

English actor (1937–2019)

- Born: Stephen Vincent Moore; 11 December 1937; Brixton, London, England
- Died: 4 October 2019 (aged 81)
- Education: Royal Central School of Speech and Drama
- Occupation: Actor
- Years active: 1959–2016
- Spouses: Barbara Mognaz (m. 1959; div. 1962); Celestine Randall (m. 1964; div. 1972); Beth Morris (m. 1974; div. 1986); Noelyn George (m. 1990)
- Children: 5

Stephen Vincent Moore (11 December 1937 – 4 October 2019) was an English actor, known for his work on British television since the mid-1970s, and particularly as the voice of Marvin the Paranoid Android in The Hitchhiker's Guide to the Galaxy.

== Biography ==
Moore was born in Brixton, London, the son of Mary Elisabeth (née Bruce-Anderson) and solicitor Stanley Moore. He attended the Archbishop Tenison's grammar school in Kennington.

He was married four times. His half-brother Mark Moore performs with S'Express, his brother-in-law was the actor James Hazeldine, and his daughter Robyn is an actor known for EastEnders.

== Acting career ==
Moore was known for his appearances in Rock Follies and other TV series such as Brideshead Revisited, The Last Place on Earth, the children's series The Queen's Nose, the drama Merseybeat and the British TV comedy series Solo, as well as numerous appearances on stage at the Royal National Theatre, the Royal Shakespeare Company and London's West End. He was known for his distinctive speaking voice in a wide range of roles, notably Marvin the Paranoid Android in radio and television adaptations of The Hitchhiker's Guide to the Galaxy.

== Death ==
On 4 October 2019, Moore died at the age of 81.

== Notable roles ==
=== Stage ===
- State of Revolution (1977, Robert Bolt's play) as Anatoly Lunacharsky, a Communist leader
- Plenty, (world premiere 1978 National Theatre London) as Raymond
- All's Well That Ends Well (1983) as Parolles (Royal Shakespeare Company & Broadway – Tony Nomination)
- Oliver! The Musical as Mr Brownlow
- The History Boys (2006) as Hector (West End revival of Alan Bennett's) play
- Henrik Ibsen's
  - An Enemy of the People as Peter Stockman (for the National Theatre London and the Ahmanson Theatre Los Angeles)
  - A Doll's House (1981) as Torvold Helmer (Stratford, England; for it he received a S.W.E.T. Award – now known as a Laurence Olivier Award – as well as being nominated for three other awards in the same season)

=== Film and television ===
- Sen noci svatojánské (1959 Czech animation of A Midsummer Night's Dream ) as Francis Flute (voice)
- The White Bus (1967) as Young Man
- The Last Shot You Hear (1969) as Peter's Colleague
- Three Men in a Boat (1975) as George
- Rock Follies (1976, TV mini-series) as Jack, left-wing teacher and morose husband of singer Anna (the role can be seen as a prototype for Marvin).
- The New Avengers (1976, TV series) as Major Prentice
- A Bridge Too Far (1977) as Major Robert Steele
- The Hitchhiker's Guide to the Galaxy (1978, as Marvin the Paranoid Android voice)
- Brideshead Revisited (1981, TV mini-series) as Cousin Jasper
- Rough Cut (1980) as Chief Flight Controller
- Diversion (1980) as Guy
- Where the Boys Are '84 (1984) as Jeff
- Laughterhouse (1984) as Howard
- The Last Place on Earth (1985, TV mini-series) as Dr. 'Bill' Wilson
- The Secret Diary of Adrian Mole (1985, ITV series) as George Mole, father of Adrian Mole
- Clockwise (1986) as John Jolly
- The Growing Pains of Adrian Mole (1987, ITV series) as George Mole
- Under Suspicion (1991) as Roscoe
- Lovejoy – "No Strings" (TV episode 1992) as Ray Morgan
- Just William (1994, TV series) as Mr. Percy Cranthorpe
- Love on a Branch Line (1994, TV mini-series) as Quirk
- Sharpe's Sword (1995, TV movie) as Colonel Berkely
- The Thin Blue Line (1995, TV series BBC) as Ron, burglary victim
- A Bit of Fry & Laurie (1995, TV series) as guest
- The Queen's Nose (1995–2001, TV series) as father of Harmony and Melody Parker
- Brassed Off (1996) as McKenzie, the colliery manager
- The Missing Postman (BBC Television film in two parts; 1997) as Ralph
- Harry Enfield (1997–1998, TV series) as father of Kevin the Teenager
- The Peter Principle (1997–2000, TV series, BBC) as Geoffrey Parkes, the Senior Cashier
- Paradise Lost in Cyberspace (1998, radio series, BBC) as George Smith (main character in Colin Swash's SciFi radio comedy)
- A Christmas Carol (1999, TV movie) as Third Broker
- Claim (2002) as Felix Halberstein
- Foyle's War (2002) - Eagle Day (TV Episode) - as Iain Stewart
- The Boat That Rocked (2009) as Prime Minister
- Doctor Who (2010, Episode: "Cold Blood") as Eldane

=== Radio and audio ===
- The Hitchhiker's Guide to the Galaxy Radio Show Live (2016) as Marvin (pre-recorded voice role)
- The voice of Marvin the Paranoid Android in radio and television adaptations of The Hitchhiker's Guide to the Galaxy. In the original radio versions, he also played a number of minor characters including Gag Halfrunt, The Ruler of the Universe, the whale and Frankie Mouse. Jim Broadbent took over the role in a 2018 adaptation of And Another Thing due to Moore's retirement.
- Reader for the original abridged audiobook versions of the Hitchhiker's Guide series, books 1–4.
- Professor Calculus in the BBC Radio dramatisation of The Adventures of Tintin series of books by Hergé
- Mr Tamperton in the BBC Radio comedy The Fall of the Mausoleum Club, episode 6 (1989)
- Geoffrey Crichton-Potter in the BBC Radio Comedy In The Red (1995), the leader of a small an unpopular party called The Reform Party.
