= Love Does Grow on Trees =

- Directed by: Bevan Walsh
- Written by: Bevan Walsh
- Produced by: Geraldine Patten
- Cinematography: Alan Stewart
- Music by: Nathan Larson
- Release date: 2008
- Running time: 10 min
- Country: United Kingdom
- Language: English

Love Does Grow on Trees is a short comedy film written and directed by Bevan Walsh and produced by Geraldine Patten. The film stars Luke Ward-Wilkinson, El Krajewski and Tom Brooke.

== Plot ==
The film is about a teenage boy whose life is thrown into chaos when he discovers adult magazines, girls and the embarrassment that goes with both.

== Cast ==
- Luke Ward-Wilkinson as Danny
- El Krajewski as Milkshake Girl
- Tom Brooke as Saint Porn
- Frank Cameron as Danny's Friend
- Petra Mahmood as Newsagent
- Gemma Ward-Wilkinson as Young Mother
- Victoria Keenan as Young Mother

== Accolades ==
- Acclaimed by Danny Boyle at the British Independent Film Awards.
- Named one of the top five shorts at the Tribeca Film Festival by New York Magazine.
- WINNER 'Best Newcomer - *Rushes Soho Shorts Festival.
- WINNER 'Best Film & Best Comedy' – Super Shorts International Film Festival
- WINNER 'Audience Award' – Film Brothers Festival of Shorts
- WINNER 'Best Short' – LLV Film Festival.
- WINNER 'Best Comedy' - Southern Appalachian International Film Festival
- WINNER 'Best Supporting Actress' for El Krajewski – Maverick Movie Awards
- NOMINATED 'Best British Short' - British Independent Film Awards.
- FINALIST - Kodak Short Film Competition.
- NOMINATED 'East Fresian Award' – Emden International Film Festival.
- RUNNER UP 'Audience Award' – Williamstown Film Festival.
- HONORABLE MENTION 'Best Narrative' – West Virginia Short Film Festival
