= Eyes Down =

- Written by: Angela Clarke
- Directed by: Christine Gernon
- Starring: Paul O'Grady; Rosie Cavaliero; Tony Maudsley; Sheridan Smith; Edna Doré; Hazel Douglas; Neil Fitzmaurice; Margaret John; Beatrice Kelley; Eugene Salleh; Michelle Butterly
- Theme music composer: Simon Brint
- Country of origin: United Kingdom
- Original language: English
- No. of series: 2
- No. of episodes: 15 (list of episodes)

Production
- Running time: 30 minutes (approximate)

Original release
- Network: BBC One
- Release: 15 August 2003 – 27 December 2004

Eyes Down is a sitcom starring Paul O'Grady as Ray Temple, the manager of a Liverpool bingo hall called The Rio, although the series was filmed in Rayners Lane in London. Although it had moderate ratings, the programme ran for two series until it was cancelled by the BBC in 2004. The show was written by Angela Clarke and directed by Christine Gernon.

== Cast ==
- Paul O'Grady – Ray Temple
- Rosie Cavaliero – Christine
- Tony Maudsley – Martin
- Sheridan Smith – Sandy
- Edna Doré – Mary
- Hazel Douglas – Kathline
- Neil Fitzmaurice – Bobby
- Margaret John – Kay
- Beatrice Kelley – Kitty
- Eugene Salleh – Terry
- Michelle Butterly – Pamela Henderson (Series 1)

== Episode list ==
=== Series 1 (2003) ===
No.	Title	Original release date
1	"Holiday Rota"	15 August 2003
Ray is trying to sort out the holiday rota, which is not easy with his staff. Sandy is in the middle of a crisis: she and boyfriend Terry have just been to the hospital for her first scan, but there was one thing she had overlooked – she had not told Terry she was actually pregnant. Meanwhile Martin is trying to pluck up the courage to tell Christine his feelings for her, and Bobby could be in big trouble: Pamela has been doing wheelies with him all night. Her husband knows she has been entertaining someone from the bingo hall, and he wants to know who.
2	"Indecency"	22 August 2003
Ray will not tolerate his staff consorting with the punters, so he is determined to photograph Bobby at it with Pamela. Unfortunately, he photographs the wrong person, is accused of indecency and has to ask the staff to be character witnesses for him. Martin decides to impress Christine by trying to look like her favourite pop star and Sandy enlists Mary's help in practising for a water birth.
3	"Stars in Their Eyes"	29 August 2003
Ray has to give the punters his "Tony Christie" during the interval when the PA system breaks down. A talent scout for Stars in Their Eyes hears him and offers him a spot. Could this be Ray's chance to escape? Bobby sets Martin up with a date in order to make Christine jealous. Unfortunately, the date, Jean, turns out to be in her early sixties, with a face like a prune. Sandy is thinking of becoming Catholic so her unborn baby will be able to go to the local Catholic school.
4	"First Aid"	5 September 2003
An elderly punter dies while Ray is calling the numbers. The other punters are upset, especially when he suggests a halt in play while the body is removed. Ray is now worried that the staff know nothing about first aid. He becomes even more worried when the local Mr Big brings his mother to Bingo and says if anything happens to her, Ray will be taking a ferry across the Mersey but only making it halfway before he has dropped off. Meanwhile, tragedy hits Bobby – he cannot get a woman to sleep with him and goes an entire night without sex. Martin takes up magic in his latest bid to impress Christine.
5	"Face Peel"	12 September 2003
Ray meets a contemporary from school who looks much younger than him – courtesy of a face peel. So Ray decides to have a face peel – with disastrous results. Eventually he is unable to call the numbers, so Bobby steps into the breach and becomes an overnight hit. Meanwhile, Christine is burgled and decides to go and live with her sister in Clacton – Martin is predictably distraught. Sandy and Terry go and see an actual birth and come back shell-shocked. Can Mary reassure them that all will be well?
6	"The Clairyoyant"	19 September 2003
Ray hires a clairvoyant to provide the interval entertainment, but all panic breaks loose when she predicts Ray's death at 7pm the following evening. Meanwhile, Martin buys a dog to try and impress Christine, and Sandy reveals she and Terry have not made love for three months because she is worried it might upset the baby.
7	"Christine's Birthday"	26 September 2003
Ray has applied for the Regional Manager's job, but the boss of the Rio chain is very keen on family values and wants to meet Ray and his wife. With only 24 hours to find himself a wife, can he possibly ensure that it is not Mary? Meanwhile it is Christine's birthday. At her party she confesses to Bobby that she is feeling sad and lonely, and that life has passed her by. Bobby tells her how Martin feels about her, but she says she does not want Martin, she wants excitement. So Bobby gives her some excitement in the gents, where Martin discovers them. Bobby has also provided some entertainment for the party: Darth Vader, the worst stripagram in the world, who turns out to be Terry.
8	"Charity"	3 October 2003
Ray is determined to get himself some good publicity as a charitable do-gooder. He makes out that Mary is ill and then raises funds to send her to Lourdes so she can come back cured. Unfortunately, she comes back with a criminal record. Martin is still smarting over Christine and Bobby, and now Christine thinks she might be pregnant. Relationships are at breaking point when something else breaks – Sandy's waters.

=== Series 2 (2004) ===
No.	Title	Original release date
1	"Next Big Thing"	3 September 2004
Ray's excited about his latest moneymaking scheme, a "guess the balls" competition, but he is determined nobody is going to guess the correct amount. Meanwhile, Sandy thinks she is the next big thing when a shopping precinct photographer convinces her she has "it"; though Ray has his doubts about the photographer's credibility.
2	"Baby"	10 September 2004
Sandy is having problems as a first time mother, resorting to sleeping in her locker due to late nights with the baby. A trip to the doctors' office helps ease her worries, but further problems arise when Mary discovers it is a different baby. Meanwhile, Ray finds out he has been left £5,000 from a deceased bingo customer. However the deceased man's widow requests him to give it to a local charity, but Ray does not agree for it to go that way. A little word from Christine shows him the error of his ways, until he discovers the money is counterfeit.
3	"Thief"	17 September 2004
Following a memo from headquarters, Ray implements a new security regime after a spate of recent robberies. A further robbery leads to Ray giving chase down the back alley to stop the thief, which leaves him to fend him off with a Barbie doll. Ray thinks it is lights out for him, until out of nowhere Mary knocks the thief to the ground. Once the police arrive, Ray takes all the credit. After the press get a hold of the story, Ray is to receive an award for Citizen of the Year, but Mary refuses to keep quiet. Meanwhile, Martin asks Christine out on a date, though not a fancy restaurant but the bingo's diner. But Christine has a dilemma: on the same night, her ex-husband returns and wants her back. Who will she choose?
4	"Ambition"	24 September 2004
Ray is a man who keeps himself to himself. But when ambition enters the picture, he is faced with an awful dilemma when the regional manager, Miss Grimes, comes calling. Does he seduce the "voluptous" woman to try to get the London job or does he run a mile? Christine soon finds herself with equal cause to regret the previous few days.
5	"Adopted"	1 October 2004
Ray is shocked to discover, at the age of 49, that he is adopted. Could his birth mother be right under his nose? Sandy, meanwhile, has won the opportunity to go on a TV game show for loving couples – but partner Terry has just walked out on her.
6	"Wedding"	8 October 2004
With Christine remarrying her ex-husband, it seems as if Martin's dreams of true love will be dashed forever. Worse still, the wedding is in the bingo hall. Fate, a missing dog and something blue combine to make it a day to remember.
7	"Christmas Special"	27 December 2004
Christmas at the Rio, and Ray is quite the Scrooge until he finds out he has been appointed manager of the newest, biggest hall in the country. Meanwhile, Martin has been thrown out by his mother after telling her about Christine, and Sandy has got trouble in the form of a Lance Corporal pen pal, who she had led to believe she wishes to marry.
