= Michelle Butterly =

British actress (born 1970)

- Born: 5 February 1970 (age 56); Liverpool, Merseyside, England
- Education: Royal Central School of Speech and Drama
- Occupation: Actress
- Years active: 1994–present
- Notable work: Soldier Soldier (1997); Casualty (1999–2001); Modern Manners (2001–2002); Eyes Down (2003); Benidorm (2012)

Michelle Butterly (born 5 February 1970) is an English actress.

== Career ==
She graduated from the Central School of Speech and Drama. She has played Julie Oldroyd in Soldier Soldier in 1997, Melanie Dyson in Casualty from 1999 to 2001, and she has appeared in Pie in the Sky, The Bill, No Angels, Midsomer Murders, and Dangerfield. She appeared for two series as Ms Perin in the BBC2 sitcom Beautiful People.

In 2012, she joined the cast for the fifth series of Benidorm, playing scouser Trudy alongside her friend Sam, played by Shelley Longworth.
