= Beautiful People (British TV series) =

- Beautiful People intertitle for series 2
- Genre: Comedy drama
- Written by: Jonathan Harvey (adaptation); Simon Doonan (source material)
- Directed by: Gareth Carrivick; David Kerr
- Starring: Luke Ward-Wilkinson; Layton Williams; Sophie Ash; Samuel Barnett; Olivia Colman; Aidan McArdle; Sarah Niles; Meera Syal
- Narrated by: Samuel Barnett
- Theme music composer: Dan Gillespie Sells; Ian Masterson
- Opening theme: "Beautiful People Theme"
- Composer: Ian Masterson
- Country of origin: United Kingdom
- Original language: English
- No. of series: 2
- No. of episodes: 12

Production
- Executive producer: Jon Plowman
- Producer: Justin Davies
- Cinematography: Rob Kitzmann (DoP)
- Editor: Mark Lawrence
- Running time: 30 minutes
- Production company: BBC Productions

Original release
- Network: BBC Two; BBC HD
- Release: 2 October 2008 – 18 December 2009

Beautiful People is a British comedy drama television series based on the memoirs of Barneys creative director Simon Doonan. The series takes place in Reading, Berkshire, in 1997, where thirteen-year-old Simon Doonan (although actually 45 years old in reality) and his best friend Kylie dream of escaping their dreary suburban surroundings and moving to cosmopolitan London "to live amongst the beautiful people". The first episode aired on BBC Two on 2 October 2008 and recorded overnight ratings of 1.5 million viewers and positive critical reaction. Episodes are self-contained, but do follow a loose story arc throughout the course of each series. The second and final series finished airing on 18 December 2009.

== Series synopses ==
=== Series 1 ===
In 2008 New York City, Simon Doonan, a window-dresser at Barneys, tells his boyfriend Sacha various tales from his childhood in Reading. Most of Simon's stories centre around how he came to own some of his most treasured possessions, which he finds a place for in his eccentric window displays. Over the course of the series, young Simon struggles to express his love of music, theatre, and fashion in a working class community, with local hooligans hounding him at school and a supportive but quirky family squashing his efforts at home. While it is implied, sexuality is not relevant.

=== Series 2 ===
The second series of Beautiful People was broadcast in 2009, when Simon returns to Reading to mend his heart after breaking up with his boyfriend Sacha. As in the first series, Simon recounts stories from his childhood in Reading, but speaks directly to the viewer instead of to Sacha. Simon and Kylie's sexuality becomes more overt in the second series as the two lads become more comfortable with themselves. In the series finale, Simon finds himself attracted to a new boy at school, prompting him to come out to his mother after being dissuaded from running away from home.

== Cast and characters ==
=== Main ===
- Simon Doonan (Luke Ward-Wilkinson), an effeminate 14-year-old schoolboy who longs to escape 1990s Reading for the glamour of London. Played by Samuel Barnett in present-day scenes.
- Kylie Parkinson (Layton Williams), Simon's best friend, whose real name is Kyle. Similarly gay, he is obsessed with Kylie Minogue and idolises Princess Diana. Played by Howard Charles in a present-day scene, but is voiced by Williams.
- Debbie Doonan (Olivia Colman), Simon's mother, a brash barmaid who speaks her mind and has a slight drinking problem.
- Andy Doonan (Aidan McArdle), Simon's father, a hardworking Irish plumber.
- Ashlene Doonan (Sophie Ash), Simon's sister, known to be promiscuous.
- Aunty Hayley (Meera Syal), Simon's blind "aunt" and Debbie's best friend, who lodges with the Doonans.
- Reba Parkinson (Sarah Niles), Kylie's mother, the Doonans' neighbour, and Debbie's rival.

=== Recurring ===
- Narg (Brenda Fricker), Simon's nan; first an angelic Catholic woman, soon turns nasty and difficult after electroshock therapy.
- Mummy, Aunty Hayley's overweight guide dog.
- Tameka (Tameka Empson), Debbie's rum-loving hairdresser.
- Johoyo (Tameka Empson), Tameka's eccentric identical Nigerian cousin who takes over her salon after her death.
- Sacha (Gary Amers), present-day Simon's New York partner in series 1.
- Jayeson Jackson (Josh Handley), Simon's classmate, who often bullies and torments Simon for being effeminate/fey.
- Miss Perrin (Michelle Butterly), the headmistress at Simon's school, whom he counts as one of the few "beautiful people" in Reading.

== Production ==
The comedy was greenlit in May 2008 by Controller of BBC Two Lucy Lumsden and Controller of Comedy Commissioning Roly Keating. The six episodes were written by Jonathan Harvey (Gimme Gimme Gimme) and directed by Gareth Carrivick. Studio filming was done at Shepperton Studios and exterior locations at South Oxhey and Bushey, Hertfordshire, Harrow, London, Grahame Park concourse and New York City. Exterior scenes of the cul de sac where Simon lives are filmed on Crabtree Close in Bushey. Doonan grew up in Reading in the 1960s but Harvey moved the setting forward to the 1990s. Executive producer Jon Plowman hoped audiences would relate to Simon's childhood; "Every teenager thinks they're different [...] I hope the audience will think: 'That's me as a teenager being laughed at. Everyone else was in a gang together, and I was in a gang of one.' But the truth is, everyone is in a gang of one."

Olivia Colman helped the cast to bond on set by arranging a visit from a mobile blood donor unit.

== Episodes ==
=== Series 1 (2008) ===
No. overall	No. in series	Title	Original release date
1	1	"How I Got My Vase"	2 October 2008
While at Kylie's, Simon steals one of Reba's dresses and tries it on back at home. Ashlene takes a Polaroid photo of him wearing it and threatens to show it to everyone unless he styles her hair to look like Heather Small's. Debbie finds the dress in the bin, assumes Reba is having an affair with Andy (not helped by Reba making a pass at Andy when he goes round to bleed the radiators), and fights her in the street. Ashlene reveals that Simon took the dress. Debbie tries to quit drinking alcohol but starts again when Andy tells her she is boring when she is sober. Simon sees supposedly vegan Hayley eating a burger and threatens to tell everyone. To keep him quiet, she gives him £30, which he spends on a vase, which costs £20, that he has had his eye on for a long time.
2	2	"How I Got My Nose"	9 October 2008
Simon wants to join a stage school and he, Kylie and Imelda (another neighbour), audition for the school production of Joseph and the Amazing Technicolor Dreamcoat, arranged by the drama teacher who is also Imelda's godfather (Robert Wilfort). Imelda gets the part of Joseph, but the lack of professionalism of the cast gets too much for the teacher, who cancels the play and replaces it with a Talent Show. Inspired by Stephen King's Carrie, which they had watched earlier in the episode, Simon and Kylie tip a bucketful of red dye onto Imelda, on stage during her performance, in front of the whole school. She is traumatised by this, and convinces her mother to transfer her to the stage school. A chance meeting with Imelda years later results in her breaking Simon's nose.
3	3	"How I Got My Beads"	16 October 2008
Simon decides to play a prank on his mum. He pretends to be the voice of her spirit guide and predicts the number 2 will bring bad news. When Debbie hears someone has died on the toilet she is convinced another death is close by. Andy's mum (Brenda Fricker) comes to stay having had an operation which completely changes her character. After a few days, Debbie is going insane. Andy's mum has brought home a fiancé and is criticising and upsetting everyone. One evening, having broken her arm she goes to make a fry-up and puts a can of baked beans in the microwave. The microwave explodes and kills her, proving Debbie's theory correct. Simon, feeling bad, calls his mum and says she will no longer be troubled by her abilities and to increase her son's pocket money by five pounds. Back in present day Simon claims to have made his beads from his grandmother's false teeth.
4	4	"How I Got My Posh"	23 October 2008
Kylie steals the school head-teacher's clutch bag. When Simon discovers this, he returns it straight away to her office, but unintentionally rests the bag on the 'speak button' on her intercom system, revealing to the whole school what he wants for his birthday – a Posh Spice doll. When he is bullied for revealing it, he gets excluded from school. In the meantime, Auntie Hayley is asked out by a man – who we later discover flashed at Ashlene. Fearing Simon's effeminate behaviour may make him an easy target for school bullies, Andy attempts to teach Simon how to play football. At first it all goes wrong, but upon discovering that Posh is dating a footballer, Simon is motivated to practice. Debbie purchases a Posh doll for him, but it gets stolen. Simon is signed up for a school football match, which he wins for his team (using his skills in choreography). Simon's team-mate (and bully) offers him the champion trophy, which he refuses to accept. The bully says he knew Simon would refuse it, which is why he brought along a Posh spice doll specially for him.
5	5	"How I Got My Tongs"	30 October 2008
Kylie and Simon covet a pair of golden hair tongs, which are displayed in the window of Tameka's hairdressers. She tells them that she won them in a contest, and they'd have to be pried 'from her cold dead fingers'. Later, Kylie asks Simon to dye his hair a dusky blonde, so he can look more like his idol Princess Diana. This fails, because Kylie's natural hair is darker, Kylie angrily tells Simon that they are no longer friends. While Simon tries to make new friends, Tameka tells him to stop loitering outside her shop: Simon replies by telling her to "drop dead". Later on while cutting Debbie's hair, Tameka actually does drop dead [leaving Debbie with an unfinished haircut] from a hole in the heart; however, Simon believes it was his words that killed her. Simon and Kylie become friends again when the death and funeral of Princess Diana unites them in grief. Debbie then takes Simon back to the hairdressers, where Tameka is lying in repose in the centre of the shop, the tongs in her hands. In the present day, Sacha asks Simon that if he didn't steal the tongs from the viewing, then how did they end up in his possession? The answer is provided by the appearance of grown-up Kylie, who states that he swapped them with a pair of his mother's before Tameka was buried.
6	6	"How I Got My Globe"	6 November 2008
Simon and Kylie believe they have found one of the Beautiful People when their new English teacher, Miss Prentice (Frances Barber), arrives from London. The boys become infatuated with their bohemian mentor who romances them with tales of her ex-lover, Francois, and of the Beautiful People. Miss Prentice takes the boys to the local pub, just as Debbie is about to start her shift. Debbie is annoyed to see Simon in the pub, but more annoyed that a responsible adult such as his teacher has allowed it. Debbie throws her out of the pub causing Simon to announce hatred of his family. Miss Prentice tells the boys that Francois has been in contact and wishes to rekindle their romance and leaves for London quoting lyrics from 'I've Never Been to Me' as she leaves the classroom, leaving her address so the boys can stay in contact. That night, Simon, still annoyed with Debbie, sneaks out of the house and travels to London with Kylie to find her. Arriving there, they discover that Miss Prentice is not living the glamorous life she implied and is in fact living on a council estate. After telling the boys to go away, Kylie and Simon discover that they are not far from BBC Television Centre and end up in the audience of Live & Kicking. Back home, Simon lies on his bed completely disillusioned by his trip. Debbie, comfortingly tells him the story of her (implicitly gay) former flatmate Jamie: he used to dream that every night he would go up to the roof and jump off and would dance across the roof tops of London, and he told Debbie that one day he would do it because you should never give up on your dreams. Jamie gave Debbie a snowglobe, but became ill and died before he got to London (His death is implied to have been AIDS related). Debbie gives it to Simon telling him to not give up on his dreams.

=== Series 2 (2009) ===
No. overall	No. in series	Title	Original release date
7	1	"How I Got My Groom"	13 November 2009
Grown-up Simon returns to Reading a single man, and with his mother Debbie recalls a class project where he discovered a terrible family secret: his parents are not married. He, therefore, plans his parents' wedding. It runs smoothly until the wedding reception, when Ashlene reveals that she is pregnant. However, she will not reveal the father.
8	2	"How I Got My Plumes"	20 November 2009
An attractive new male teacher, obsessed with the Eurovision Song Contest, catches Kylie and Simon's eye and comes to dinner with his boyfriend with disastrous results. He takes Simon and Kylie, who are trying to form a boy band, to the dress rehearsal of the Eurovision Song Contest 1998 but they unexpectedly appear on stage at the live event. Guest appearance by Dana International. Aunty Hayley (Meera Syal) does not appear in this episode.
9	3	"How I Got My Water Feature"	27 November 2009
Influenced by watching Ground Force, Simon sees to it that the garden gets a new water feature, and the women of Melody Crescent are inspired by a sexy fitness instructor to slosh their way to health and beauty. Guest appearance by Elaine Paige.
10	4	"How I Got My Camp"	4 December 2009
When the Doonans' plans for a holiday abroad are ruined by Reba ruining Andy's plumbing reputation, the Doonans decide to fake a holiday in-house and keep it a secret from their neighbours. Kylie, having a fight with his mother over his effeminate ways, discovers their secret and decides to join him, but when his abusive father, fresh out of prison, comes to call, Kylie returns home to protect his mother ending in tragedy.
11	5	"How I Got My Turner"	11 December 2009
Debbie becomes the muse to Turner Prize-winning artist Stacey Bile (a parody of Tracey Emin), Simon and Kylie get lessons in Indian dancing, and Aunt Hayley explores a new career in telephone astrology. Guest appearances by Dannii Minogue, Mark Lawson and Alan Yentob as themselves, and Alice Lowe as Stacey Bile.
12	6	"How I Got My Gash"	18 December 2009
Ashlene's baby is about to arrive with surprising news, and Kylie discovers a world of magic in the cupboard under the stairs. Simon learns he has something in common with the new boy at school, and Debbie uses a local tragedy to launch her acting career. Debbie reads Simon's note he wrote prior to cancelling his plans to run away, where he reveals his sexuality. The father of Ashlene's baby is revealed to be Jayeson, the bully. Debbie slaps Jayeson for impregnating her daughter, making her a grandmother; and for bullying Simon for being gay. Back in present day, Simon tells his mother he will marry Mickey, his old crush.

== Broadcast ==
Series 1 of Beautiful People premiered on 2 October 2008. It was broadcast on Thursdays at 21:30 on BBC Two, during the channel's "Thursdays Are Funny" strand, and at 22:00 on BBC HD.

The second series debuted on 13 November 2009 at 22:00 on BBC Two. The flashbacks in the second series are set in 1998. In the present-day scenes, Sacha and Simon have split up and Simon has returned to Reading. An ongoing storyline in 1998 concerns the unplanned pregnancy of Simon's sister Ashlene.

Internationally, the series aired on ABC in Australia, OUTtv in Canada, and Logo TV in the United States.

== Reception ==
=== Critical reaction ===
The series was previewed by The Guardian's Grace Dent as "a sort of camp, working-class British Arrested Development". Dent wrote that it "made [her] laugh more than anything [she had] seen so far on TV this year". Tim Teeman, the entertainment editor for The Times, rated "How I Got My Vase" three out of five stars. Teeman complimented Ward-Wilkinson's and Williams's acting but did not believe the 1990s were long ago enough to feel nostalgia for. Hermione Eyre for The Independent praised Williams and Colman, and compared the show to The Secret Diary of Adrian Mole.

=== Ratings ===
Series 1 of Beautiful People was broadcast on Thursdays at 21:30 on BBC Two. Series 2 was broadcast at 22:00 on Fridays on BBC Two.

#	Series 1	BBC Two	
#	Series 1	Viewers (millions)	Audience share
1	"How I Got My Vase"	1.52	7%
2	"How I Got My Nose"	1.26	5.7%
3	"How I Got My Beads"	1.08	5.4%
4	"How I Got My Posh"	1.02	4.5%
5	"How I Got My Tongs"	1.38	6.1%
6	"How I Got My Globe"	1.33	5.9%
	Series 2		
1	"How I Got My Groom"		
2	"How I Got My Plumes"	0.568	2.2%
3	"How I Got My Water Feature"	0.710	3.4%
4	"How I Got My Camp"		
5	"How I Got My Turner"		
6	"How I Got My Gash"		

=== Awards ===
In 2010, Beautiful People was nominated for a GLAAD Media Award for "Outstanding Comedy Series" during the 21st GLAAD Media Awards.

== Merchandise ==
- Doonan's memoirs have been re-released with a tie-in cover by HarperCollins.
- An accompanying soundtrack to the series was released by EMI on 20 October 2008. Whilst mostly being a compilation of the hit records from the 70s, 80s and 90s that were used in the series, the album also contains new cover versions, including a duet by Kylie and Dannii Minogue of ABBA's "The Winner Takes It All", and a version of Dolly Parton's 1970s hit "Jolene" covered by Sophie Ellis-Bextor.
