= Luke Ward-Wilkinson =

English actor and singer

Luke Ward-Wilkinson (born 7 August 1993, Cambridge, England) is an English actor and singer known for his lead role as the teenage Simon Doonan in the BBC comedy series Beautiful People which ran for two series (2008–2009) on BBC Two.

== Early life, education and training ==
Ward-Wilkinson was born in Cambridge, England on 7 August 1993. He attended The Netherhall School and Parkside Community College in Cambridge and also went to the Mackenzie School of Speech and Drama, as well as the King Slocombe School of Dance. He also belonged to the Young Actors Company (previously known as Whizz Kids).

== Career ==
Ward-Wilkinson made his television acting debut playing 'Scott' in the 2005 Channel Five series The Secret of Eel Island.

He also played Evan Adams in the ITV drama series Wild at Heart, Ensign Percival Beauclare in the 2008 ITV drama Sharpe's Peril and Thomas McDowell in The Christmas Miracle of Jonathan Toomey.

He played the lead role as the teenage Simon Doonan in the BBC comedy series Beautiful People which ran for two series (2008–2009) on BBC Two.

In 2015, starred as Ralph in the 2015–16 UK tour of Lord of the Flies. Also in 2015, in October, he appeared in an episode of BBC One's Doctors as well as in the BBC One series Luther.

== Credits ==
- The Secret of Eel Island – Scott (2005–2007)
- Wild at Heart – Evan Adams (2006–2009)
- The Christmas Miracle of Jonathan Toomey – Thomas McDowell (2007)
- Love Does Grow on Trees – Danny (2008)
- Sharpe's Peril – Ensign Percival Beauciere (2008)
- Beautiful People – Simon Doonan (2008–2009)
- Luther – Owen Woodward (2015)
