= Mitchell and Webb =

British comedy duo

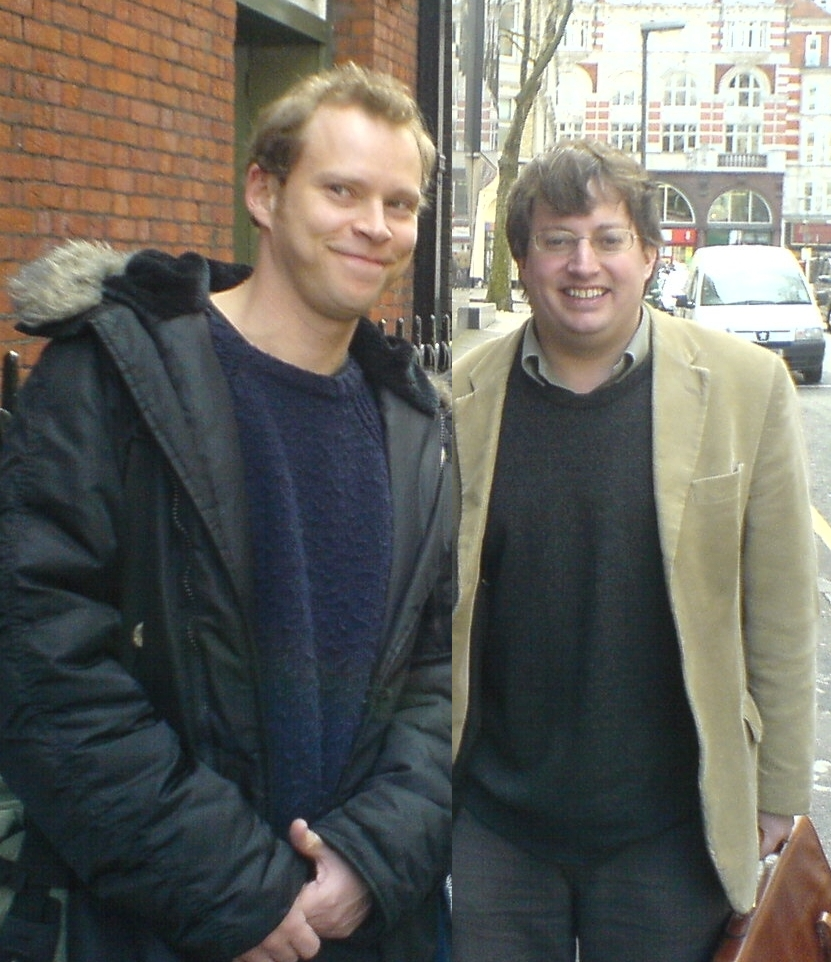
- Robert Webb and David Mitchell in 2007
- Notable work: Bruiser (2000); The Mitchell and Webb Situation (2001); Peep Show (2003–2015); That Mitchell and Webb Look (2006–2010); Ambassadors (2013); Back (2017–2021); Mitchell and Webb Are Not Helping (2025–)

Comedy career
- Years active: 1995–present
- Medium: Television; radio; film
- Genres: Sketch comedy; black comedy; character comedy; surreal humour
- Members: David Mitchell; Robert Webb

Mitchell and Webb are a British comedy double act composed of David Mitchell and Robert Webb. They are best known for starring in the Channel 4 sitcom Peep Show and their radio and TV sketch shows That Mitchell and Webb Sound and That Mitchell and Webb Look. The duo first met at the Footlights in 1993 and collaborated on the 1995 revue while at Cambridge.

== Works ==
=== Television and radio ===
After graduating from university, the duo performed in two-man shows at the Edinburgh Fringe Festival and some sketch writing, including a series of Big Train and also for Armstrong and Miller's eponymous show. Their big break came in 2000 when they joined the writing team for the BBC Two sketch show Bruiser. The following year, the short-lived Play UK channel invited them to write their own sketch show, The Mitchell and Webb Situation. Later, they wrote and starred in the Radio 4 sketch show That Mitchell and Webb Sound, later adapted for television on BBC Two as That Mitchell and Webb Look. The first series of That Mitchell and Webb Look won the BAFTA for Best Comedy Programme in 2007.

They often appear with actors Olivia Colman, James Bachman, Mark Evans and Paterson Joseph.

In 2008, the duo wrote a pilot script for their first original TV sitcom, Playing Shop. The two star as Eric and Jamie, friends who set up a business together after they are made redundant from their old jobs. Hartswood Films recorded the pilot episode on 20 December, with a view to producing a full series for BBC Two. Although approved by BBC, plans for future episodes fell through as Mitchell and Webb decided not to proceed with it.

Mitchell and Webb collaborated with Armstrong and Miller again for the 2009 Red Nose Day fundraising event. They co-wrote and starred in two short sketches incorporating Armstrong and Miller's World War II airmen characters from The Armstrong & Miller Show and their characters Sir Digby and Ginger from their radio show That Mitchell and Webb Sound.

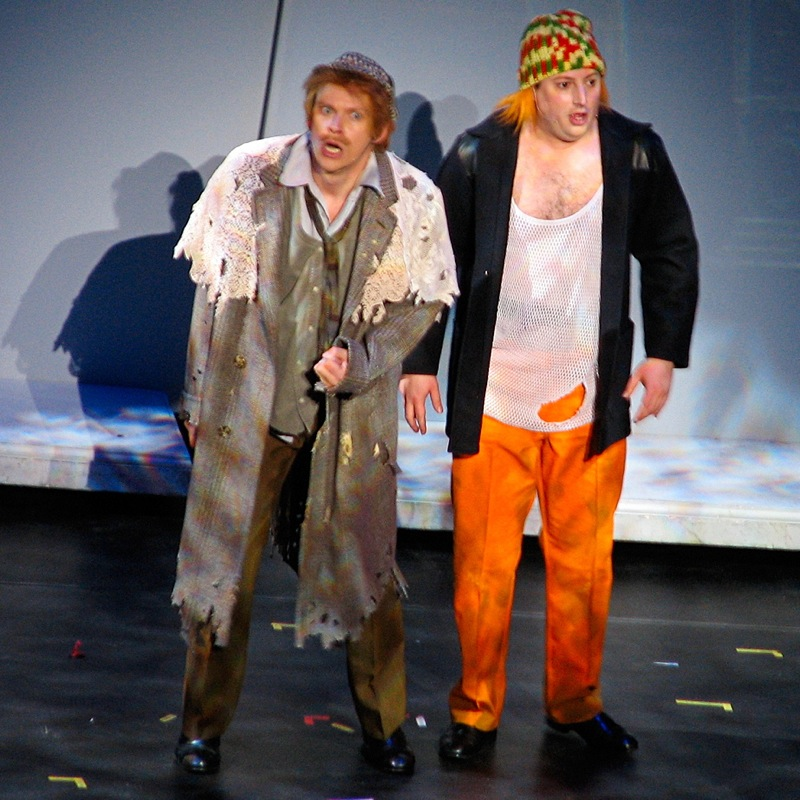
Mitchell (right) as Ginger on stage with Webb as Sir Digby Chicken Caesar during a performance of their The Two Faces of Mitchell and Webb stage tour

In 2012, the pair provided the voices for the pair of robots in the Doctor Who TV episode "Dinosaurs on a Spaceship" in addition to starring in the BBC Two comedy-drama Ambassadors. In 2017, they appeared in the Channel 4 sitcom Back, on which they also worked as executive producers.

In 2022, they appeared in the Adult Swim series Rick and Morty as "Knights of the Sun" in the episode "A Rick in King Mortur's Mort" alongside Jack Black, Matt King and Daniel Radcliffe. In 2025, they featured in the sketch comedy series Mitchell and Webb Are Not Helping.

=== Writing ===
Mitchell and Webb wrote a great deal of their work together, otherwise writing material individually and bringing two ideas together. Robert Webb confirmed in a 2026 interview with Tom Simons that he and Mitchell would occasionally write sketches for That Mitchell and Webb Look in a pub, or in Mitchell's flat, where they would write some sketches on Mitchell's computer in his bedroom.

=== Other ===
Mitchell and Webb have also appeared in the UK regional versions of the "Get a Mac" advertisements for Apple. They also voiced a pair of peas on the Ant & Dec's Saturday Night Takeaway sponsorship TV adverts for Birds Eye. Magicians, a film starring the pair, was released on 18 May 2007. They have also published the comedy book This Mitchell and Webb Book.

== Filmography ==
=== Film ===
Year	Title	Role (David Mitchell)	Role (Robert Webb)
2007	Magicians	Harry Kane	Karl Allen

=== Television ===
Years	Title	Role (David Mitchell)	Role (Robert Webb)
2000	Bruiser	Various	Various
2001	The Mitchell and Webb Situation	Various	Various
2003–2015	Peep Show	Mark Corrigan	Jeremy Usborne
2006–2010	That Mitchell and Webb Look	Various	Various
2013	Ambassadors	Keith Davis	Neil Tilly
2017–2021	Back	Stephen Richard Nichols	Andrew Thomas Donnelly
2025–present	Mitchell and Webb Are Not Helping	Various	Various

=== Radio ===
Year	Title	Role (David Mitchell)	Role (Robert Webb)
2003—2013	That Mitchell and Webb Sound	Various	Various
