= The Two Faces of Mitchell and Webb =

Live comedy tour

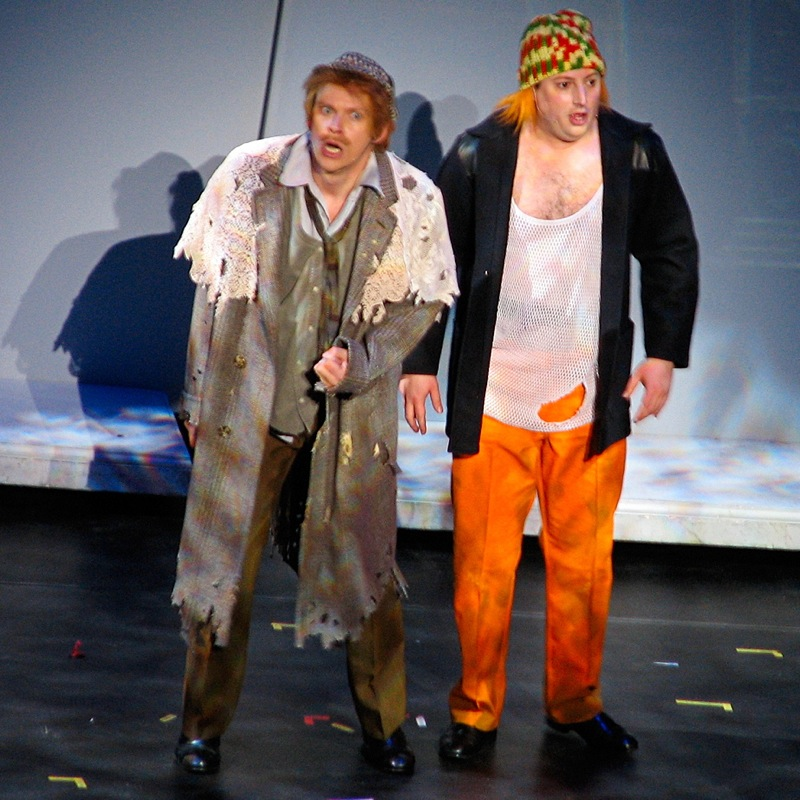
Webb and Mitchell as Sir Digby Chicken-Caesar and Ginger during the live stage show.

The Two Faces of Mitchell and Webb was a live stage tour undertaken by the comedy team of David Mitchell and Robert Webb, accompanied by their frequent collaborators James Bachman and Abigail Burdess, who played supporting roles.

== Overview ==
The show toured forty-four venues in the UK between 19 October and 15 December 2006, ending with three consecutive nights at the Brixton Academy. Webb and supporting actress Abigail Burdess married shortly after the tour's conclusion.

The content of the tour was adapted by Mitchell, Webb, and director Nick Morris from material previously generated by the team, particularly the sketch shows That Mitchell and Webb Look and That Mitchell and Webb Sound, with significant focus placed on recurring sketches and characters. These included Ted and Peter, Numberwang, The Party Planners, Big Talk, The Surprising Adventures of Sir Digby Chicken-Caesar, The Honeymoon's Over and The Lazy Film Writers. Mitchell described the show as "a compromise of the radio and television work", in the sense that "the theatre can accommodate the visual stuff you do on television and the wordier stuff you do for radio",, while Webb described the show as "a greatest hits of all our favourite stuff, ever".

== Media releases ==
The date at the Grand Opera House in York on 27 October 2006 was filmed for a DVD release, which was released in the UK (Region 2) on 27 November 2006 by Universal. The disc included a teaser trailer for the film Magicians, in which both Mitchell and Webb starred. A double disc CD was also released in 2006 by Universal Pictures.

== Critical reception ==
The show received mixed-to-negative reviews in the British press. In a three-star review of the opening night at the Brighton Dome, The Independent writer Julian Hall remarked that "there is dubious merit in merely repeating sketches that ran on their TV show". He praised the SS soldier sketch, which had been "embroidered" since its TV run, as well as sketches about the monarchy and charities, but noted an air of "disappointment" among attendees during the intermission and a lack of "banter" between the pair. Joanne Mace positively reviewed the show at The Anvil, Basingstoke in a review for the Monday Gazette, praising Mitchell's Sky Sports parody sketch and noting that some viewers had responded enthusiastically to the familiar content and catchphrases, which were incorporated into the pair's merchandise for the tour. In a two-star review of the Southampton show for The Guardian, Brian Logan claimed the show suffered from "populist catchphrase-peddling" and that "little effort has been made to re-imagine the format for the live arena". In a mixed review of the same night for The Daily Telegraph, Dominic Cavendish praised various sketches including the discussion show Big Talk, the Sky Sports parody, and the pair's snooker commentary and SS soldier sketches, but criticised their "awkward breaks for costume changes", the quality of the supporting actors' sketches, and the material's suitability for two-hour shows in large venues.
