= Are We the Baddies? =

Comedy sketch by the British comedians Mitchell and Webb

Mitchell and Webb as Nazi officers having a moment of existential revelation

"Are We the Baddies?" is a 2006 comedy sketch by the British comedians Mitchell and Webb, performed both on recorded television in That Mitchell and Webb Look and live at The Secret Policeman's Ball. The sketch was originally created for the radio series That Mitchell and Webb Sound, but was modified for television.

In it, Mitchell and Webb play two Nazi Waffen-SS officers in a foxhole during World War II waiting for the Red Army to attack. They gradually become aware of the parallels between their own situation and that of movie villains, realising that the fact they have skulls on their hats might indicate that they are the villains, not the heroes of their own situation.

== "Are we the baddies?" meme ==
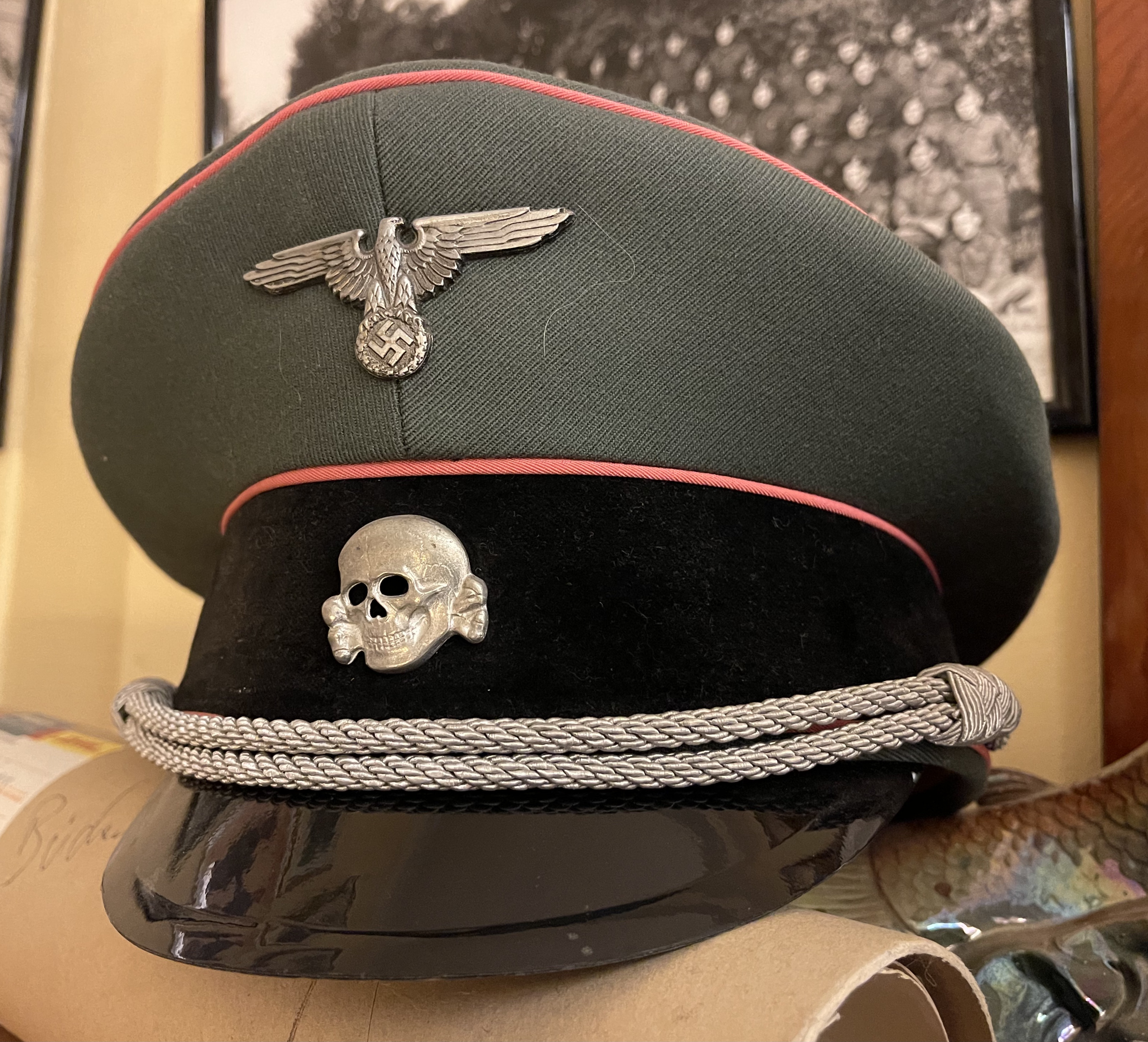
A Waffen-SS Panzer officer's cap similar to the type shown in the sketch, showing the totenkopf skull emblem

The sketch achieved the status of a meme, being viewed over one million times on YouTube, and repeated in various forms in media worldwide. In one example, a little boy is shown pointing at a statue of the slave trader Edward Colston and asking his father "Are we the Baddies?".

The sketch was referenced in real life during the Horizon IT inquiry when the former Post Office communications chief Mark Davies was asked by the investigating counsel "Had you ever asked yourself: might we, in fact, be the baddies?". It has also been referenced by The Times in relation to the state of the United States under the Trump administration.

When Graham Platner was running for the United States Senate as a Democratic Party candidate in Maine in 2025 and 2026, several commentators referred to the sketch in connection with Platner's former tattoo depicting a Totenkopf, including Jonathan Turley in The Hill, Jonathan Chait in The Atlantic, and Jim Geraghty in National Review.

== See also ==
- Black and white hat symbolism in film
- Metafiction
