= This Mitchell and Webb Book =

- Cover
- Author: David Mitchell and Robert Webb
- Language: English
- Genre: Comedy
- Published: September 2009
- Publisher: Fourth Estate Ltd
- Publication place: United Kingdom
- Media type: Print: hardback
- Pages: 262
- ISBN: 9780007280193

This Mitchell and Webb Book is a book written by David Mitchell and Robert Webb of the comedy duo Mitchell and Webb. A tie-in to the television series That Mitchell and Webb Look, it was released by Fourth Estate Ltd in September 2009 in the UK, and January 2010 in the US.

It contains material expanding the lives and stories of some of the characters from their BBC Radio 4 sketch show, That Mitchell and Webb Sound, such as Ted and Peter, two alcoholic ex-snooker players turned commentators. The book features a supposed interview with "Peter DeCoursey" (the commentator's full name) in which he reveals that he is gay and poses for some photos. Of Ted it features a tabloid-style tour of his house and interviews with himself and his fifth wife, Asti. It also contains some features made for the book only, like the pitch of the non-existent television sitcom You Know Who Your Mates Are, a parody of working class sitcoms written by out-of-touch middle class people. It is written in a deliberately bad way for comic effect.

== Reviews ==
The Guardian praised the book, calling it "a deliciously texty book packed with the same kind of slick, idea-rich comic prose that you find in Mitchell's Observer column."
