= The Bubble (game show) =

- Created by: Armoza Formats
- Presented by: David Mitchell
- Country of origin: United Kingdom
- Original language: English
- No. of series: 1
- No. of episodes: 6 (list of episodes)

Production
- Running time: 30 minutes
- Production company: Hat Trick Productions

Original release
- Network: BBC Two
- Release: 19 February – 26 March 2010

The Bubble is a British television quiz show hosted by David Mitchell, and made for the BBC by Hat Trick Productions. Each week, three comedians are tasked to differentiate real news stories from fake ones, after four days of isolation in 'The Bubble', a remote country house. A first series was broadcast on BBC Two from 19 February 2010, running for six episodes. A second series was planned but later abandoned due to Mitchell's commitments to the Channel 4 series 10 O'Clock Live.

== Concept ==
In the show, three different contestants are placed in 'The Bubble', a place of isolation without access to the news. Contestant Frank Skinner speculated that the name of the show comes from the sterile isolation regime employed in so-called boy in the bubble medical cases. Once released, the contestants must then spot real news stories that have occurred while they were isolated, from fake ones created for the show.

The Bubble format was devised in Israel by Armoza Formats, and had already been broadcast in Israel, Poland, Denmark and Sweden. Already successful in those countries, the British version was the first to use celebrities as contestants, and was being aimed at a high-brow audience similar to that for the quiz show QI.

== Format ==
At the start of each episode, the three contestants are brought straight from The Bubble to the studio. In front of a studio audience they then compete against each other for points, as Mitchell presents them with both real and fake stories. The format varied across the series, but the three rounds that appeared in every programme were:

- A news clips round, where three clips from news programmes were shown; one was real, and two had been faked for the programme using contributions from actors and journalists such as Quentin Letts. This round would sometimes be repeated later on in the show using shorter clips and a voiceover from Mitchell instead of the original newsreader.
- A newspaper headlines round, where three newspaper articles were shown; again, only one had genuinely appeared in newspapers, whilst the others had been mocked up.
- The final buzzer round, where Mitchell read out assorted news stories and the contestants had to buzz in and guess whether they were true or not.

In the first two rounds, correctly guessing the real story was rewarded with a point; in the final round, an incorrect guess resulted in a point being deducted.

Two rounds appeared only in the first episode of the first series: one where the contestants were shown a piece of video footage and had to guess why it was relevant to the news from three options, and another where Mitchell described a picture that had appeared in the newspapers and the contestants had to guess why said picture had appeared in the news.

== Production ==
The show was produced for the BBC by Hat Trick Productions, who produce the long-running BBC news quiz show Have I Got News for You. A pilot was filmed in February 2009 but was not broadcast. The pilot episode featured Katy Brand, Miranda Hart and Frank Skinner as contestants. Episodes were filmed the day before broadcast, airing in the 10 pm slot on Friday nights (except Ep.5).

According to Skinner, for the British version of the show The Bubble was a large and remote country house somewhere in the East Midlands, in which the contestants lived with two of the production team for their period of isolation, being prevented from wandering away from the house, with their mobile phones confiscated, and denied access to newspapers, radio, television or the internet.

Both ITV News and Sky News assisted in filming fake stories for the show. BBC, however, refused, only allowing archive material to be used despite the show supposedly covering current events. Ian Burrell of The Independent called out this as a case of double standards, especially since BBC presenters took part in producing the unaired pilot, and the basic fact The Bubble was aired on the network. A BBC spokesman said "We are sure The Bubble on BBC Two will be extremely funny but BBC journalists will leave it to the comedians to do the comedy," while Burrell pointed out that several of its presenters had taken part in other fictional shows before, and described it as a "sense of humour failure". The BBC boycott was featured as one of the news stories in the first episode, with nobody picking it as the real story.

According to Mitchell speaking in January 2011, both he and the BBC were keen to film a second series; however, he later chose to work on 10 O'Clock Live for Channel 4, whose 15-week live run clashed with the period the BBC intended to film the second series of The Bubble.

Repeats of the series began airing on Dave in January 2011.

== Episodes ==
No.	Contestants	Winner	Original release date
1	Victoria Coren; Reginald D. Hunter; Frank Skinner	Reginald D. Hunter	19 February 2010
2	Ed Byrne; Germaine Greer; Jon Richardson	Germaine Greer	26 February 2010
3	Clive Anderson; Andy Hamilton; Sarah Millican	Andy Hamilton	5 March 2010
4	Marcus Brigstocke; Julia Hartley-Brewer; Sue Perkins	Marcus Brigstocke	12 March 2010
5	Katy Brand; Tim Key; Josie Long	Tim Key	18 March 2010
6	Miranda Hart; Shappi Khorsandi; Robert Webb	Robert Webb	26 March 2010

notes

- Episode 5 aired a day early due to Sport Relief 2010
- Sue Perkins swapped weeks with Andy Hamilton due to an injury
