= Robert Webb =

British actor (born 1972)

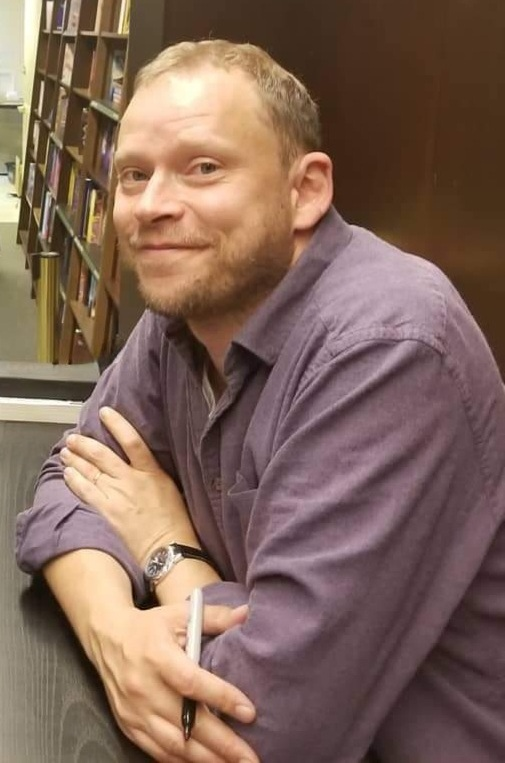
- Webb in June 2018
- Born: Robert Patrick Webb; 29 September 1972 (age 54); Boston, Lincolnshire, England
- Education: University of Cambridge (BA)
- Occupations: Comedian; actor; writer
- Years active: 1995–present
- Spouse: Abigail Burdess (m. 2006)
- Children: 2

Robert Patrick Webb (born 29 September 1972) is an English comedian, actor and writer. He rose to prominence alongside David Mitchell as part of the comedy duo Mitchell and Webb.

Mitchell and Webb starred in the Channel 4 sitcom Peep Show, in which Webb plays Jeremy "Jez" Usbourne. The two also starred in the sketch show That Mitchell and Webb Look, for which they then performed a stage adaptation, The Two Faces of Mitchell and Webb. The duo starred in the 2007 film Magicians, and in the short-lived series Ambassadors in 2013. Webb headed the critically acclaimed sitcom The Smoking Room and was a performer in the sketch show Bruiser. From 2017 to 2021, he starred alongside Mitchell in the Channel 4 comedy-drama Back.

Webb is also a regular comedy panellist, appearing on shows such as The Bubble, Have I Got News for You, Never Mind the Buzzcocks, QI, Mastermind, Argumental, and Was It Something I Said? He has also hosted and narrated several programmes. His other sitcom appearances include Blessed, The Bleak Old Shop of Stuff, and Fresh Meat.

== Early life ==
Robert Patrick Webb was born on 29 September 1972 in Boston, Lincolnshire, and grew up in Woodhall Spa. His parents divorced when he was five years old, with his mother remarrying a year or so later. He has two older brothers and a younger half-sister. He grew up on a council estate, and was educated at Queen Elizabeth's Grammar School in Horncastle. Having grown up watching the sitcoms The Young Ones, Blackadder, and Only Fools and Horses, he became interested in drama and poetry while in school, and began writing parodies. At the age of 13, partly because of resentment towards his father, he made a conscious effort to lose his native Lincolnshire accent in favour of a more standard English accent. When he was 17 and in the lower sixth form preparing for his A-levels, his mother died of breast cancer, and he moved in with his father and re-sat his A-levels. In 1992, Webb attended Robinson College, Cambridge, where he studied English and became vice-president of the Footlights, where he met David Mitchell. The two met at an audition for a Footlights production of Cinderella in 1993.

== Career ==
=== Mitchell and Webb ===
The two put together their first project, a show titled Innocent Millions Dead or Dying – A Wry Look at the Post-Apocalyptic Age (With Songs), in January 1995. Webb later described it as being "fucking terrible". From this the duo were given the chance to write for Alexander Armstrong and Ben Miller, and for series two of Big Train. After minor work on The Jack Docherty Show and Comedy Nation, their first break into television acting was in 2000, on the short-lived BBC sketch show Bruiser, which they primarily wrote, and starred in.

In 2001, the duo were commissioned for a sketch show of their own, entitled The Mitchell and Webb Situation, which ran for six episodes on the now defunct channel Play UK. Mitchell and Webb's next project came in 2003, with starring roles in the Channel 4 sitcom Peep Show, as flatmates Mark Corrigan and Jeremy "Jez" Usbourne respectively. The pair shared the 2007 Royal Television Society Award for "Comedy Performance", and were jointly nominated for Best Television Comedy Actor at the 2006 British Comedy Awards. Webb was nominated for the Best Television Comedy Actor award again, this time without Mitchell, in 2009. Peep Show ran for nine series, making it the longest-running sitcom in Channel 4 history.

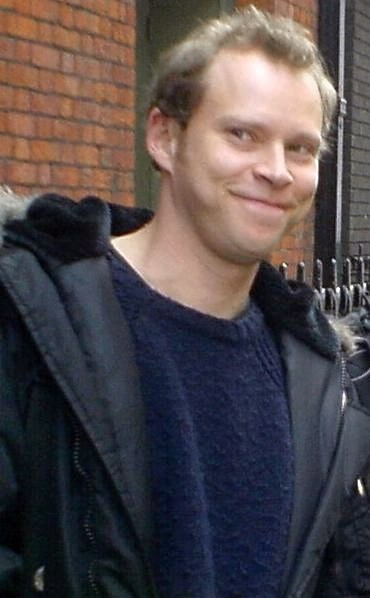
Webb in 2007

After the success of Peep Show, Mitchell and Webb returned to sketch comedy with their BBC Radio 4 sketch show That Mitchell and Webb Sound, which ran for five series. The show was adapted for television and became That Mitchell and Webb Look; producer Gareth Edwards described it as "the shortest pitch (he had) ever written". Towards the end of 2006 the pair made their first tour, with a show called The Two Faces of Mitchell and Webb. The tour was criticised as just "a succession of largely unrelated scenes" by The Guardian's Brian Logan, who gave it a rating of two stars.

That Mitchell and Webb Look won them the BAFTA for "Best Comedy Programme or Series" at the 2007 awards, and they earned a further nomination for it in 2009. It was nominated for two British Comedy awards in 2006: "Britain's Best New TV Comedy" and the "Highland Spring People's Choice". Their stage tour The Two Faces of Mitchell and Webb was nominated for the British Comedy Award for "Best Stage Comedy", and That Mitchell and Webb Sound won a Sony Silver Award. Their first film, Magicians, was released on 18 May 2007. It was directed by Andrew O'Connor and written by Jesse Armstrong and Sam Bain. Webb played the role of modern magician Karl.

They filmed Playing Shop, a comedy television pilot for BBC Two about two men who operate a business out of their shed, which they also wrote. Although the BBC were happy with it, Mitchell and Webb scrapped it themselves, as they felt it was too similar to Peep Show. A new pilot had been commissioned, but the plan was later shelved.

The duo fronted the campaign of the UK version of Apple Inc.'s Get a Mac adverts, with Mitchell playing a PC. The adverts proved controversial. Writing in The Guardian, Charlie Brooker claimed that the use of Mitchell and Webb in the adverts was a curious choice. He compared the characters of PC and Mac in the adverts to those of Mark and Jeremy in Peep Show, stating that "when you see the ads, you think, 'PCs are a bit rubbish yet ultimately lovable, whereas Macs are just smug, preening tossers.'" The British Sitcom Guide criticised the pair for "selling their souls". One journalist called the adverts "worse than not funny", and accused Mitchell and Webb of "an act of grave betrayal" for taking corporate work. In an interview with The Telegraph, Webb responded to the critics of the Apple adverts, stating that "when someone asks, 'Do you want to do some funny ads for not many days in the year and be paid more than you would be for an entire series of Peep Show?' the answer, obviously, is, 'Yeah, that's fine'". In the same interview, Mitchell also said "I don't see what is morally inconsistent with a comedian doing an advert. It's alright to sell computers, isn't it? Unless you think that capitalism is evil – which I don't. It's not like we're helping to flog a baby-killing machine".

=== Solo work ===
Webb has appeared in two series of the BBC Three sitcom The Smoking Room (2004) and the Radio 4 sketch show Concrete Cow. In 2005 he appeared in the Ben Elton-scripted BBC One sitcom Blessed as Ardal O'Hanlon's 'perfect' counterpart.

He and Olivia Colman also featured as a naturist couple in Confetti, a 2006 film about a competition for the most original wedding. Webb has since said that he believed that his genitals would be pixellated out but only discovered at the screening of the film that they were not. Also in 2008, Webb made his West End stage debut in the UK premiere of Neil LaBute's Fat Pig.

Webb won the 2009 series Let's Dance for the charity Comic Relief, parodying the audition sequence from the film Flashdance. He narrated the series Young, Dumb and Living Off Mum. He hosted a 2010 Channel 4 series looking at the week's online news, Robert's Web.

He has appeared on several panel shows, including Have I Got News for You, Never Mind the Buzzcocks and QI. In January 2011, Webb appeared on a celebrity version of BBC quiz Mastermind, answering nine questions correctly on his specialist subject (the novels of Ian McEwan) and 11 correctly on the general knowledge round. In 2011 Webb played Dan, a geology lecturer, in the Channel 4 series Fresh Meat. Later that year, he was cast in the costume comedy The Bleak Old Shop of Stuff, a parody of Charles Dickens' works. From 2011 to 2012 Webb replaced Rufus Hound as team captain on the BBC comedy panel show Argumental.

Webb was the narrator of Channel 5's anti-nostalgia series 10 Things I Hate About, which began on 16 April 2012. In each episode, Webb presented his opinion on the awful aspects of a particular year (1995, 1990, 1987, and 1999).

In 2011 Webb presented "Groundbreaking Gags" on BBC Three, in which he looked at the significant gags for which the animated show Family Guy has been recognised.

From December 2012 Webb featured in adverts for Compare the Market, as its founder Maurice Wigglethorpe-Throom.

From September 2021 Webb was a contestant in the nineteenth series of Strictly Come Dancing, partnered with professional dancer Dianne Buswell. The couple completed three dances and were in 13th place, when Webb withdrew on 13 October, due to his heart condition. He said he had an urgent consultation with his heart specialist, after experiencing symptoms, and that she had recommended he pull out of the competition. Webb said he was "extremely sorry" to have to leave, adding: "It became clear that I had bitten off way more than I could chew for this stage in my recovery."

Webb was the invited guest on the Radio 4 long running series Desert Island Discs, hosted by Lauren Laverne in March 2023.

=== Writing ===
Together with Mitchell, Webb published his first comedy book This Mitchell and Webb Book, which was released in the UK and the US in 2009 by HarperCollins imprint Fourth Estate. An abridged edition of highlights from This Mitchell and Webb Book, entitled How to Cope with Mitchell and Webb, was released only in the UK on 1 October 2009. The pair signed a two-book deal with Fourth Estate but, as of April 2026, a second book remained unpublished.

Webb wrote articles for the comments pages of the Telegraph newspaper between 2009 and 2011. He criticised those who commented on the online versions of his articles in a New Statesman piece. In a 2013 interview, Webb explained his experience with the publication:

I wasn't particularly busy at the time, so what I should have been doing in three hours, I was taking a day and a half to do, while getting drunk. I'd sit in the garden, drinking and talking to myself, then go back upstairs, write another sentence, go, "Oh, this isn't right." I'd make such a meal of it. If I'd been more professional, I'd have just done it and got on with my life.

Webb thinks it is harmful for men to 'keep a stiff upper lip' and hide their feelings.

In 2015, Webb began writing his first solo memoir, How Not to Be a Boy, on growing up in working class Lincolnshire. The memoir was released in August 2017. A spoken-word adaptation, read by Webb, was featured as BBC Radio 4's Book of the Week to coincide with the launch.

In 2020, Canongate published Webb's first novel, Come Again.

== Political views ==
In August 2014, Webb was one of 200 public figures who were signatories to a letter to The Guardian expressing their hope that Scotland would vote to remain part of the United Kingdom in September's referendum on that issue.

Webb was a staunch supporter of the Labour Party; he joined the party in 2013 in response to Russell Brand's interview on Newsnight in which Brand suggested people should not vote as a form of protest. By November 2015, Webb announced on Twitter that he was leaving the Labour Party, citing his lack of confidence in party leader Jeremy Corbyn. He also expressed his disapproval at the appointment of Guardian journalist Seumas Milne as Labour's press secretary, and was quoted as saying that paying his party subscription with Milne in the post made him "feel sick". However, he endorsed the Labour Party in the 2017 general election.

In December 2018, Webb tweeted his support of an article by Janice Turner in which she criticised Mermaids (a charity which supports transgender children and their families) that had sought and was eventually awarded a £500,000 UK National Lottery grant. He also identified himself as a "gender-critical feminist" but emphasised that he opposes transphobia. He stood by his comments in a 2020 interview with The Sunday Times. In a 2021 interview with Jesse Thorn on the NPR show Bullseye, he said that his criticism of Mermaids should not be confused with an opposition to supporting transgender children, and that the debate around gender-nonconforming children had become overheated. When asked for details on his opposition to Mermaids, he declined to elaborate further and stated he could no longer remember the specifics. He has been criticised by some LGBT news outlets, charities, and activists for this stance.

== Personal life ==
In December 2006 Webb married fellow comedian Abigail Burdess, with whom he had worked on the BBC Two comedy show The Bleak Old Shop of Stuff. His comedy partner David Mitchell was the best man. They live in London's West Hampstead area and have two daughters.

In a 2008 Independent article, Webb explained that he was a "swaggering atheist" prior to the death of his mother, but that the loss led to him starting to pray. Upon reflection, however, he stated that his temporary departure from atheism was a coping mechanism for the loss and he returned to atheism after he learned to "co-exist" with his mother's death: "I've returned to total non-belief. I don't know how long it'll last, but God, it's good to be back!" That same year, Mitchell and Webb faced criticism and accusations of "selling out" for appearing in an advertisement for Apple Inc. Webb responded, "I'm not a sell-out. The problem is that that presupposes a set of principles we don't actually hold. We never said comedians shouldn't do ads, or that we somehow operate outside the mixed market economy... really, we're just doing a job."

In his 2017 memoir How Not to Be a Boy, Webb revealed that he is bisexual.

In 2020, Webb underwent emergency surgery on his heart for a mitral valve prolapse after being diagnosed with the condition at a routine medical check. He had attributed the symptoms to binge drinking, saying, "I just assumed, that's the booze... I thought this is what you feel like when you're 47 and you treat your body like a skip." He then gave up drinking alcohol entirely and said, "The drinking crawled up so gradually that I was slow-killing myself... it was certainly an addiction at the end, a dependency. I was thinking of [drinking] at any given time of the day."

== Filmography ==
=== Film ===
Year	Title	Role
2006	Confetti	Michael
2007	Magicians	Karl
2012	The Wedding Video	Tim
2016	Absolutely Fabulous: The Movie	Nick
2023	A Rare Find	Narrator

=== Television ===
Year	Title	Role	Notes
1997	The Jack Docherty Show	Various characters	Writer
1998	Comedy Nation	Various characters	
2000	Meaningful Sex	Graham	
2000	Bruiser	Various characters	Writer
2000	Urban Gothic	Bentley Kaye	Episode 1.7: "The One Where..."
2001	Fun at the Funeral Parlour	Packham	Episode 1.4: "The Mountains of Doom"
2001	The Mitchell and Webb Situation	Various characters	Writer
2001	People Like Us	Tom Wolfson	Episode 2.5: "The Bank Manager"
2002	The Gist	Paul Ashdown	
2003	My Family	Arvo	Episode 4.14: "Sixty Feet Under"
2003–2015	Peep Show	Jeremy Usbourne	
2004	55 Degrees North	Dog handler	Episode 1.3
2004–2005	The Smoking Room	Robin	17 episodes
2005	Twisted Tales	Colin	Writer; Episode 1.9: "Nothing to Fear"
2005	Britain's 50 Greatest Comedy Sketches	Host	
2005	Blessed	Bill Hathaway	8 episodes
2005	Have I Got News for You	Panellist	
2006	Friday Night with Jonathan Ross	Himself	
2006	Rob Brydon's Annually Retentive		
2006	Imagine	Himself	1 episode
2006	Best of the Worst		
2006–2010	That Mitchell and Webb Look	Various characters	Writer; BAFTA for Best Comedy Programme or Series; British Comedy Award nominations
2007	The Graham Norton Show	Himself	
2007	Stephen Fry: 50 Not Out	Himself	
2007	Time Shift	Himself	
2008	The Law of the Playground	Himself	8 episodes
2008	Never Mind the Buzzcocks	Panellist	S22E11
2008	Lily Allen and Friends	Himself	
2008	Saturday Kitchen	Himself	
2008	Would I Lie to You?	Panellist	S2E1
2009	Friday Night with Jonathan Ross	Himself	
2009	The One Show	Himself	
2009	The Graham Norton Show	Himself	
2009	Let's Dance for Comic Relief	Himself	Winner of first series
2009	My Life in Verse	Himself	
2009–2011	Young, Dumb and Living Off Mum	Host	
2010	This Morning	Himself	
2010	All Star Mr. and Mrs.	Himself	
2010	Great Movie Mistakes	Host	
2010	You Have Been Watching		
2010	Great TV Mistakes	Host	
2010	BBC Breakfast	Himself	
2010	Robert's Web	Presenter	
2010	You Have Been Watching		
2010	Cushelle advert	Narrator	
2010	Let's Dance for Sport Relief	Judge	
2010	Cutting Edge		
2010	The Real Hustle: Around the World	Host	
2010	History of Now: The Story of the Noughties	Host	
2010	Peep Show & Tell	Himself	
2010	Have I Got News for You	Host	S39E3
2010	Never Mind the Buzzcocks	Host	S24E11
2010	Mad and Bad: 60 Years of Science on TV		
2010	The Bubble	Himself	Episode 6
2010	BBC Breakfast	Himself	
2011	Never Mind the Buzzcocks	Panellist	Comic Relief special
2011	Great Movie Mistakes 2: The Sequel	Host	
2011	Great Movie Mistakes 3: Not in 3D	Host	
2011	Alexander Armstrong's Big Ask	Himself	
2011	QI	Panellist	Series H Episode 15
2011	The Sex Researchers	Narrator	
2011	Family Guy: Ground Breaking Gags	Host	
2011	Would I Lie to You?	Panellist	S5E2
2011	24 Hour Panel People	Panellist	
2011	Celebrity Mastermind	Contestant	
2011	Argumental	Team captain	
2011	EastEnders: Greatest Exits	Host	
2011	Pop's Greatest Dance Crazes	Host	
2011–2012	Fresh Meat	Dan	
2011–2012	The Bleak Old Shop of Stuff	Jedrington Secret-Past	
2012	The One Show	Himself	
2012	Room 101	Himself	
2012	Doctor Who	Robot	Episode 7.2 "Dinosaurs on a Spaceship"
2012	Threesome	Colin	Episode 2.3 "Alice's Friend"
2012	Tales of Friendship with Winnie the Pooh	Narrator	
2013	Great Movie Mistakes – IV: May the Fourth Be with You Cutdowns	Host	
2013	The Matt Lucas Awards	Himself	
2013	Ambassadors	Neil Tilly	
2013	Was It Something I Said?	Himself	
2013	Agatha Christie's Marple	Tim Kendall	Season 6, Episode 1 "A Caribbean Mystery"
2013–2014	You Saw them Here First	Narrator	
2015	Lego Dimensions	Laval, Robot 2 (Archive audio)	Video game
2016	Horrible Histories	Christopher Wren	episode; grisly great fire of London
2016	Cold Feet	Grant	
2017–2021	Back	Andrew	Also executive producer
2018	Travel Man	Himself	
2019	Frayed	Rufus	
2021	Strictly Come Dancing	Himself	Contestant
2022	Rick and Morty	Red-bearded knight	Season 6, Episode 9 "A Rick in King Mortur's Mort"
2022–2024	Whitstable Pearl	Tom Grant	8 episodes
2023	Death in Paradise	Justin West	2 episodes
2023	Aqua Teen Hunger Force	Voice	Season 12, Episode 1 "Shaketopia"
2023	Murder, They Hope	Martin	1 episode
2025	Mitchell And Webb Are Not Helping	Various Characters	Writer
2025-	High Hoops	Mr Holt	
2026	Comic Relief does The Weakest Link	Himself	

=== Radio ===
Year	Title	Role	Notes
1998	Children's Hour... With Armstrong And Miller	Writer	Sketch comedy program.
2002-2004	Concrete Cow	Various	Sketch comedy program.
2003–2013	That Mitchell and Webb Sound	Various	Sketch comedy program.
2007	Daydream Believers	Various	Adapted from a failed television pilot.

== Bibliography ==
=== Non-fiction ===
- How Not to Be a Boy (Canongate Books, 2017)

=== Fiction ===
- Come Again (Canongate Books, 2020)

== Other work ==
Webb has appeared on a number of podcasts, including The QuaranTea Break Podcast with Simon Ward, The Two Shot Podcast, Podcast Secrets of the Pharaohs and RHLSTP.

Preceded by N/A	Winner of Let's Dance for Comic Relief; 2009	Succeeded by Rufus Hound
