= David Mitchell (comedian) =

British comedian and actor (born 1974)

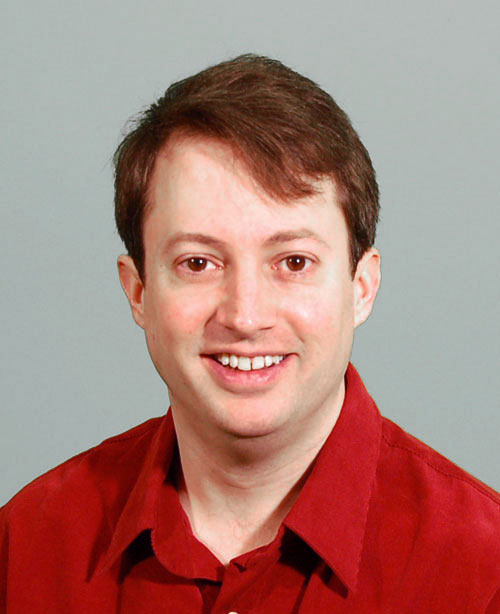
- Mitchell in 2009
- Born: David James Stuart Mitchell; 14 July 1974 (age 52); Salisbury, Wiltshire, England
- Education: Peterhouse, Cambridge (MA)
- Occupations: Comedian; actor; writer
- Years active: 1995–present
- Spouse: Victoria Coren (m. 2012)
- Children: 2
- David Mitchell's voice from the BBC programme Desert Island Discs, 19 July 2009

David James Stuart Mitchell (born 14 July 1974) is a British comedian, actor, and writer. He rose to prominence alongside Robert Webb as part of the comedy duo Mitchell and Webb. The duo starred in the Channel 4 sitcom Peep Show, in which Mitchell plays Mark Corrigan. He won the British Academy Television Award for Best Comedy Performance in 2009 for his performance. Mitchell and Webb have written and starred in several sketch shows including Bruiser, The Mitchell and Webb Situation, That Mitchell and Webb Sound, That Mitchell and Webb Look, and Mitchell and Webb Are Not Helping. They have also starred in the British version of Apple's "Get a Mac" ad campaign. Their first film, Magicians, was released in 2007. They starred in the short-lived TV series Ambassadors in 2013, and in the Channel 4 comedy-drama Back from 2017 to 2021.

Mitchell starred as Owen in the BBC Radio 4 sitcom Think the Unthinkable, as Dr. James Vine in the BBC One sitcom Jam & Jerusalem, and as William Shakespeare in the BBC Two historical comedy Upstart Crow. He has starred in the BBC One detective comedy-drama Ludwig since 2024. He is a frequent participant on panel shows, as a team captain on Would I Lie to You?, the host of The Unbelievable Truth on BBC Radio 4, and the former host of The Bubble and Was It Something I Said?; as well as guesting on other panel shows including QI, The Big Fat Quiz of the Year, Mock the Week, 8 Out of 10 Cats Does Countdown, and Have I Got News for You. He was also a co-host of the comedy news-show 10 O'Clock Live. As a writer, he contributes opinion pieces to the newspapers The Observer and The Guardian.

== Early life ==
David James Stuart Mitchell was born in Salisbury on 14 July 1974, the son of hotel managers Kathryn Grey (née Hughes) and Ian Douglas Mitchell. As his mother is Welsh, hailing from Swansea, and his father was born to a family that was originally Scottish, he considers himself British rather than specifically English. He explored his ancestry in a 2009 episode of Who Do You Think You Are? and discovered his connection to the Gaelic scholars John Forbes and Alexander Robert Forbes. In 1977, when Mitchell was two years old, his parents left their jobs to give lectures on hotel management as this gave them more time with him. He has a younger brother named Daniel.

Mitchell's family moved to Oxford, where his parents became lecturers at Oxford Polytechnic (now Oxford Brookes University). He attended the independent private New College School. In a 2006 interview with The Independent, he recalled his childhood dreams: "When I was at school I either wanted to be a comedian-stroke-actor or prime minister. But I didn't admit that to other people, I said I wanted to be a barrister and that made my parents very happy. I didn't admit I wanted to be a comedian until I came to university, met a lot of other people who wanted to be comedians, and realised it was an okay thing to say." From the age of 13, Mitchell was educated at Abingdon School, a public school. Having always been top of the class at primary school and prep school, he realised after moving to Abingdon that there were plenty of people more intelligent than he, so he turned his attention to debating and drama "where [he] had a chance of being the best".

Mitchell often took part in plays "largely because [he] got to play cards backstage". His roles consisted mainly of small minute-long parts until he won the role of Rabbit in an adaptation of Winnie-the-Pooh. This was the first time that he was "consciously aware [he] was doing a performance" and that this "was better, even, than playing cards". He had been "obsessed" with comedy writing since his school days as he "always felt that doing a joke was the cleverest thing" and "would intrinsically prefer a parody of something to the actual thing itself".

As part of his gap year, he worked as a "general dogsbody" at Oxford University Press, in its English Language teaching division. He was rejected by Merton College, Oxford, then went to Peterhouse, Cambridge, in 1993, where he studied history. There, he began performing with the Cambridge Footlights, of which he became president for the 1995–96 academic year. In his first year at university, he met Robert Webb during rehearsals for a Footlights production of Cinderella in 1993, and the two men soon established a comedy partnership. According to Mitchell, these factors had a detrimental effect on his academic performance at university and he attained a 2:2 in his final exams.

== Career ==
=== Early work and Peep Show ===
Before his break into comedy, Mitchell worked as an usher at the Lyric Hammersmith theatre, and in the cloakroom of TFI Friday among other jobs.

We have superficial differences and underlying similarities. We pretty much agree about what we think is funny. But we come across differently. We get on really. And together we're greater than the sum of our parts.

— Mitchell describing his partnership with Webb

Mitchell's first project with Webb was in January 1995, a show about a nuclear apocalypse entitled Innocent Millions Dead or Dying: A Wry Look at the Post-Apocalyptic Age. Webb later described it as being "fucking terrible". After leaving university he and Webb began performing a number of two-man shows at the Edinburgh Fringe.

As a result of their performances at the Edinburgh Fringe, the duo were given the chance to write for Alexander Armstrong and Ben Miller and for series two of Big Train. After minor work on The Jack Docherty Show and Comedy Nation, their first break into television acting was in 2000, on the short-lived BBC sketch show Bruiser, which they primarily wrote, and starred in. The show also featured future Academy Award and BAFTA winner Olivia Colman, who would become a regular cast member of Mitchell and Webb projects, and Martin Freeman, later of The Office fame. Other cast members included Matthew Holness and Charlotte Hudson. Additional material for the show was provided by various people, including Ricky Gervais and James Bachman.

In 2001 the two men were commissioned for a sketch show of their own, entitled The Mitchell and Webb Situation, which ran for six episodes on the now-defunct channel Play UK. The show was reasonably well received. Wessex Scene's Darren Richman said: "What the series lacked in budget, it made up for in magnificent material," and went on to call it "far superior to the vastly overrated Little Britain" and "perhaps the greatest forgotten sketch show of modern times". Eureka! TV, which released The Mitchell and Webb Situation on DVD in 2005, said that the show "gushes forth an hilarious stream of surreal and quirkily inventive sketches," as well as calling it a "cult success". In the interview with Wessex Scene, Mitchell stated that he was "more proud of the way it turned out than annoyed that it was only aired on a small channel".

Mitchell and Webb's next project came in 2003, with starring roles in the Channel 4 sitcom Peep Show, as flatmates Mark Corrigan and Jeremy Usbourne respectively. The show originated from writers Jesse Armstrong and Sam Bain's failed attempt to complete a team-written sitcom for the BBC; they had an old script that they wanted to revive and Mitchell and Webb helped out, with it eventually evolving into Peep Show. Despite low viewing figures (which almost got the show cancelled after series three) the show was received to wide critical acclaim. The British Sitcom Guide called it "without a doubt one of the best sitcoms of the decade". Ricky Gervais has been cited as saying: "The last thing I got genuinely excited about on British TV was Peep Show, which I thought was the best sitcom since Father Ted." The BBC hailed Mitchell's performance in the series, stating that: "As Mark Corrigan, David reached out to all those middle-aged men in a twentysomething's body, who believe drugs are boring and systems are necessary if society is to function at all." Mitchell has stated that he empathises with Mark and enjoys playing him and that he "agrees with many of [Mark's] opinions". Peep Show aired for nine series, which makes it the longest-running sitcom in Channel 4 history.

In 2009, Mitchell won the British Academy Television Award for Best Comedy Performance for his work on Peep Show, after having lost in the same category the year before. He was nominated again in 2010. He won the award "Best Television Comedy Actor" at the 2007 British Comedy Awards, and the pair shared the 2007 Royal Television Society Award for "Comedy Performance". They were also jointly nominated for "Best Television Comedy Actor" at the 2006 British Comedy Awards. Peep Show itself has also won the BAFTA for "Best situation comedy" in 2008, and the British Comedy Award for "Best TV comedy" in 2006, and retained it the following year. It also won "Best TV Comedy" at the South Bank Show Awards, and claimed a Golden Rose in 2004.

=== Other Mitchell and Webb projects ===
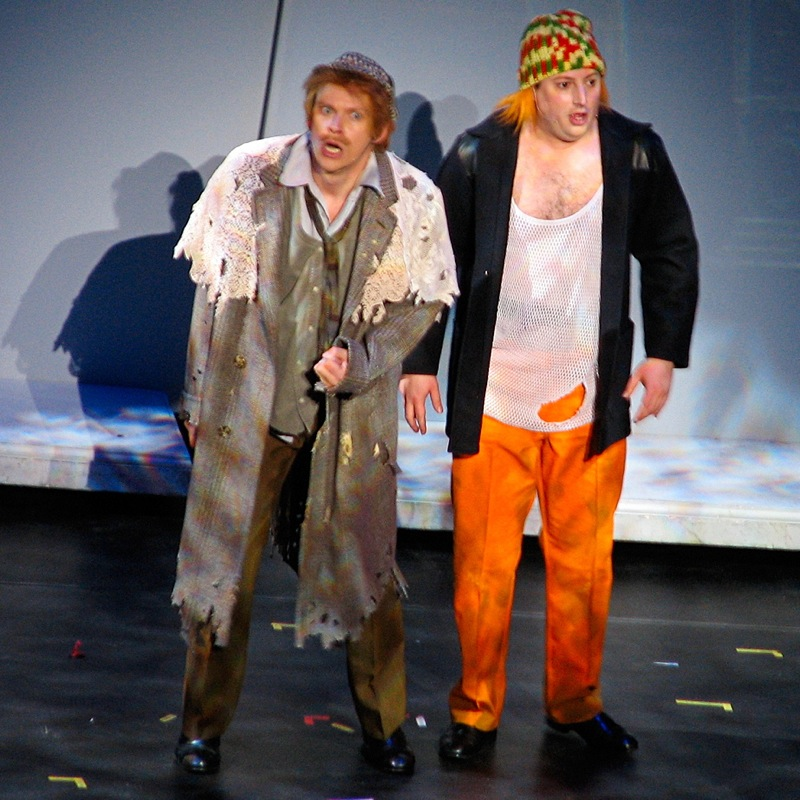
Mitchell (right) as "Ginger" on stage with Robert Webb during a performance of their The Two Faces of Mitchell and Webb stage tour

After the success of Peep Show, Mitchell and Webb returned to sketch comedy with their BBC Radio 4 sketch show That Mitchell and Webb Sound, which ran for five series. The show was adapted for television and became That Mitchell and Webb Look. Producer Gareth Edwards described it as "the shortest pitch [he had] ever written". The show ran for four series. Towards the end of 2006 the pair made their first tour, with a show called The Two Faces of Mitchell and Webb. The tour was criticised as just "a succession of largely unrelated scenes" by The Guardian's Brian Logan, who gave it a rating of two stars.

That Mitchell and Webb Look won them the BAFTA for Best Comedy Programme or Series at the 2007 awards, and they earned a further nomination for it in 2009. It was nominated for two British Comedy Awards in 2006: Britain's Best New TV Comedy and the Highland Spring People's Choice. Their stage tour The Two Faces of Mitchell and Webb was nominated for the British Comedy Award for Best Stage Comedy, and That Mitchell and Webb Sound won a Sony Silver Award.

Their first film, Magicians, was released on 18 May 2007. It was directed by Andrew O'Connor and written by Jesse Armstrong and Sam Bain. Mitchell played the role of a magician named Harry. Later in 2007, the pair recorded a pilot BBC Radio 2 sitcom entitled Daydream Believers, in which Mitchell played Ray, a science-fiction writer. The show was previously a one-off television pilot from Channel 4's Comedy Lab, and also starred Mitchell and Webb.

Mitchell and Webb's first comedy book, This Mitchell and Webb Book, was published in 2009. A second book was planned for 2010. They also wrote and filmed Playing Shop, a comedy television pilot for BBC Two about two men who operate a business out of their shed. Although the BBC commissioners were happy with it, Mitchell and Webb scrapped it themselves, as they felt it was too similar to Peep Show. A new pilot had been commissioned, but the plan was later shelved. Mitchell and Webb voiced a robotic duo in the Doctor Who episode "Dinosaurs on a Spaceship" in 2012.

In 2007 the duo fronted the UK version of Apple Inc.'s "Get a Mac" adverts, with Mitchell playing PC. The adverts received much criticism. Writing in The Guardian, Charlie Brooker claimed that the use of Mitchell and Webb in the adverts was a curious choice. He compared the characters of PC and Mac in the adverts to those of Mark and Jeremy in Peep Show, stating that "when you see the ads, you think, 'PCs are a bit rubbish yet ultimately lovable, whereas Macs are just smug, preening tossers.'" The British Sitcom Guide also criticised the pair for "selling their souls". One journalist called the adverts "worse than not funny", and accused Mitchell and Webb of "an act of grave betrayal" for taking corporate work. In an interview with The Telegraph, Robert Webb responded to the duo's critics, stating that "when someone asks, 'Do you want to do some funny ads for not many days in the year and be paid more than you would be for an entire series of Peep Show?' the answer, obviously, is, 'Yeah, that's fine.'" In the same interview, Mitchell also said: "I don't see what is morally inconsistent with a comedian doing an advert. It's all right to sell computers, isn't it? Unless you think that capitalism is evil – which I don't. It's not like we're helping to flog a baby-killing machine."

In 2005, the duo were placed ninth on a list of the United Kingdom's best television talent, and were named twelfth in a Radio Times list of the most powerful people in television comedy.

=== Solo acting, presenting and writing ===
As well as his work alongside Webb, Mitchell has appeared on his own in several shows. He played technical expert Owen in the Radio 4 sitcom Think the Unthinkable in 2001. He played the surgeon Dr Toby Stephens in the BBC One sitcom Doctors and Nurses. In 2005 he played Kate's hapless secretary Tim in the BBC's updating of The Taming of The Shrew in its ShakespeaRe-Told series. Mitchell appeared as various roles on the Channel 4 sketch programme Blunder. The show was not well received, with the British Sitcom Guide naming it as the worst thing that Mitchell did in all of 2006 in their "British Sitcom Awards" of that year. He portrayed the recurring character of Dr. James Vine in the BBC sitcom Jam and Jerusalem. Mitchell had a small part in the film I Could Never Be Your Woman, playing an English writer, also named David. While in Los Angeles to record the part he decided that he did not like the area much, and preferred filming in Britain.

He wrote series five of the BBC Two impressionist sketch show Dead Ringers, and voiced Mitch in the Disney animated series Phineas and Ferb. He also narrated the reality show Beauty and the Geek. Following the success of Channel 4's Alternative Election Night in 2010, which Mitchell hosted with Jimmy Carr, Charlie Brooker and Lauren Laverne, the four presented 10 O'Clock Live, a series of live shows looking at the week's affairs. Mitchell has a solo segment entitled Listen to Mitchell. The show ran for three series.

Mitchell has presented four series of the online video show David Mitchell's Soapbox, a series of short monologues co-written with John Finnemore for ChannelFlip. In these monologues Mitchell has criticised a variety of subjects, including the BBC show Doctor Who and 3D television. Matt Warman of The Daily Telegraph suggested that the series could be a sign that new comedy will increasingly become available online, rather than on television. The series has been released on DVD.

He provided the voiceover for a £1 million government advert for FRANK, warning of the dangers of cocaine, as "Pablo the Drug Mule Dog"; and also for the Driving Standards Agency's "The Highway Code". He writes columns for The Observer and The Guardian. He also took part in Channel 4's Comedy Gala, a benefit show held in aid of Great Ormond Street Children's Hospital at the O2 Arena. In October 2009, Mitchell signed a deal with HarperCollins and its imprint Fourth Estate to write a volume of memoirs and a novel. The memoirs, Back Story: A Memoir, was published in October 2012 with the novel scheduled for 2013.

Mitchell plays William Shakespeare in all three series of the sitcom Upstart Crow, the first series of which was broadcast in 2016 as part of the celebrations of the 400th anniversary of the playwright's death.

In September 2023, Mitchell published Unruly: A History of England's Kings and Queens, a non-fiction book about the history of the English monarchy up until Queen Elizabeth I. The book was praised by critics; The Daily Telegraph rated Unruly 4/5 stars; In October 2023, Mitchell went on a national book tour.

In January 2024, Mitchell began filming on the new BBC One comedy detective drama series Ludwig. Mitchell plays the titular character of John ‘Ludwig’ Taylor, a man who assumes the identity of his missing identical twin brother as he tracks him down. The series premiered on BBC One and the BBC iPlayer on 25 September 2024. Early reviews of the detective drama were positive with one reviewer stating "Just Give Him (Mitchell) the Bafta Now".

=== Stage ===
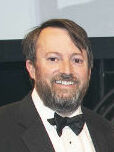
Mitchell in 2019

Mitchell made his stage debut in Ben Elton's The Upstart Crow which premiered in London in February 2020 at the Gielgud Theatre. He played the part of William Shakespeare as in the television series Upstart Crow which inspired the play. The play was forced to close in mid-March 2020 due to the COVID-19 pandemic. However, it re-opened in September 2022 at the Apollo Theatre, and played for a 10-week run until 3 December 2022.

=== Panel shows ===
Mitchell has become a regular participant on many panel shows, leading The Independent's James Rampton to christen him "if not king, then certainly prince regent of the panel games." Mitchell is a team captain on the BBC panel show Would I Lie To You?, opposite Lee Mack. The show has run since 2007. Since 2007, he has hosted 33 series of The Unbelievable Truth, a panel game on BBC Radio 4. The inaugural episode of Was It Something I Said?, a panel comedy show that Mitchell hosts, was broadcast on Channel 4 in October 2013.

Mitchell was a team captain on the Channel 4 comedy quiz show Best of the Worst, opposite Johnny Vaughan. Mitchell has also hosted ten episodes of Have I Got News For You. Mitchell hosted the panel show The Bubble. He hosted the second week of Channel 4's FAQ U, and appeared as himself in an episode of Rob Brydon's Annually Retentive, a panel show parody. He also appeared as one of the participants on the Channel 4 show TV Heaven, Telly Hell, and has appeared on several episodes of Question Time.

Mitchell's other appearances include QI, Have I Got News for You, Mock the Week, Just a Minute, Armando Iannucci's Charm Offensive and 8 Out of 10 Cats, as well as appearances on The Big Fat Quiz of the Year in 2005, 2007, 2009, 2011, 2014, 2015, 2016, 2017, 2018 and 2020. In a 2007 interview with Digital Spy, Mitchell stated that he enjoyed panel shows, as they are "a game worth playing". He then further explained his appreciation of the panel format by challenging criticism from Fast Show co-creator Charlie Higson, who stated in September 2013 that panel comedies were overtaking television programming at the expense of sketch shows and sitcoms:

There was a quote from Catherine Zeta-Jones about playing golf with her husband Michael Douglas. We essentially all started to imagine the scene of the two of them playing golf and that was very enjoyable and turned into a really fun bit of TV. It is moments like that which, for me, justify the existence of panel shows because no-one would ever have written those words. It purely came out of that combination of people which proves panel shows can produce funny TV in a way you could never write into a sitcom or a sketch show and thereby justifies its place on screen. I think it is a great form of entertainment and we shouldn't lose sight of that.

Radio Times named Mitchell "The Best Comedy Panel Show Guest" in the world, stating that "he's incredibly, disgustingly witty" and "even starting to make Paul Merton look slow on the uptake".

Following his BAFTA win, Mitchell was ranked at No. 53 in the 2009 MediaGuardian 100, an annual ranking of media people in The Guardian. In reference to his ubiquitous presence in broadcast and print media, The Guardian's writer called him "the go-to funnyman of the moment". In their entry for Peep Show on their list of "The top 50 TV shows of the Noughties", The Times labelled Mitchell "a national institution".

=== Last One Laughing UK ===
In August 2025, Mitchell was announced as a contestant on the second series of LOL: Last One Laughing UK, which aired in 2026. On the show he performed stand-up comedy. He would go on to win the series.

== Influences ==
Mitchell's favourite actor is Alec Guinness, and he lists Spike Milligan, Peter Sellers and Peter Cook as his comedy idols. Following the death of Richard Briers in February 2013, Mitchell said that whenever he has acted he "always hoped to be something like him". He has also identified Morecambe and Wise, Monty Python and The Two Ronnies as highly influential on his career.

== Personal life ==
Mitchell has often joked about his personal life in interviews. In 2005, he stated, "I've been in so many situations when I've just said nothing to someone I've fancied." He later added, "I'm sort of all right on my own. I don't want it to be forever, but the fundamental thing is I'm all right alone." For many years, he lived in Kilburn, London, as the flatmate of novelist Robert Hudson. In 2006, he was the best man at his comedy partner Robert Webb's wedding.

He met broadcaster Victoria Coren at Jonathan Ross' 2007 Halloween party and was "completely smitten". She decided to pursue someone else at the time and he later admitted to pining for her, but they had begun dating by December 2010. They were married at St Peter's Church, Belsize Park, on 17 November 2012, with Robert Webb as his best man. Their first daughter was born in May 2015. On 1 November 2023, they announced the birth of their second daughter. They currently live in Belsize Park, North London.

Mitchell remains interested in world history. In a 2006 interview with The Observer, he said "I can see myself in a few years' time joining the National Trust and going round the odd castle. I think I might find that restful as the anger of middle age sets in." In his 2007 interview on Parkinson, he said that if he could go back in time to do one thing, he would choose to attend the construction of Stonehenge to ask them "why they were bothering".

He is a cricket and snooker fan; he also enjoys playing tennis and squash. He is an agnostic.

Mitchell cites Evelyn Waugh among his favourite authors. He appeared on the radio programme Desert Island Discs in 2009. He revealed that he once attended a Shirley Bassey concert and that he owned just two albums: Phil Collins' ... But Seriously and Susan Boyle's I Dreamed a Dream.

== Political views ==
Mitchell has Scottish ancestry, and was one of 200 public figures who signed an open letter to The Guardian in August 2014 expressing their hope that Scotland would vote to remain part of the United Kingdom in September's referendum on that issue. His participation followed a May 2011 column in The Observer in which he wrote, "If Scotland ever goes it alone [...] the British will have lost their country."

In his 2024 book Unruly, Mitchell states that he is a "left-leaning centrist".

== Filmography ==
=== Film ===
Year	Title	Role	Notes
2007	Magicians	Harry	First starring role
2007	I Could Never Be Your Woman	David	
2014	The Incredible Adventures of Professor Branestawm	Harold Haggerstone	
2015	Professor Branestawm Returns	Harold Haggerstone	
2015	Up All Night	Policeman	
2017	Gun Shy	John Hardigger	
2019	Greed	Nick Morris	
2023	Migration	GooGoo (voice)	

=== Television ===
Year	Title	Role	Notes
1997	The Jack Docherty Show	Various characters	Also writer
1998	Comedy Nation	Various characters	
2000	Bruiser	Various characters	Also writer; appeared in all six episodes
2001	Fun at the Funeral Parlour	Strachan	Episode 1.4: "The Mountains of Doom"
2001	The Mitchell and Webb Situation	Various characters	Also writer; appeared in all six episodes
2001	Comedy Lab	Ray	Daydream Believers: "Brand New Beamer"; later adapted into a radio one-off
2002	TLC	1950s patient	Episode 1.6: "Agency Nurse"
2003	The Strategic Humour Initiative	Various characters	
2003–2015	Peep Show	Mark Corrigan	Longest running role; Won – British Comedy Award for Best TV Comedy Actor in 2007; Nominated – BAFTA for Best Comedy Performance in 2008; Won – BAFTA for Best Comedy Performance in 2009; Nominated – BAFTA for Male Performance in a Comedy Role in 2010, 2011
2004	Doctors and Nurses	Dr Toby Stephens	
2005	Twisted Tales	Ray	Episode 1.9: "Nothing to Fear"; also writer
2005	All About George	Jed	Episode 1.3
2005	Dirty tricks	Penguin	Episode 1.5
2005	Look Around You	Pat Taylor	Episode 2.6: "Live Final"
2005	ShakespeaRe-Told	Tim Agnew	Episode 1.3: The Taming of the Shrew
2006	Rob Brydon's Annually Retentive	'Himself'	Episode 1.1
2006	Blunder	Various characters	Also writer
2006–2009	Jam & Jerusalem	Dr James Vine	Appeared in 12 episodes
2006–2010	That Mitchell and Webb Look	Various characters	Also writer; Won – BAFTA for Best Comedy Programme or Series in 2007; nominated 2009; Two British Comedy Award nominations
2009–2025	Phineas and Ferb	Mitch	Three episodes
2010	Playing Shop		Also writer, unaired pilot.
2011	How TV Ruined Your Life	'Himself'	Episode 1.6
2011–2012	The Bleak Old Shop of Stuff	Jolliforth Jollington	Two episodes
2012	Doctor Who	Robot (voice)	Episode 7.2: "Dinosaurs on a Spaceship"
2013	Ambassadors	Keith Davis	
2014	The Incredible Adventures of Professor Branestawm	Harold Haggerstone	TV film
2015	Harry Hill in Professor Branestawm Returns	Harold Haggerstone	TV film
2016–2020	Upstart Crow	William Shakespeare	Sitcom
2016–	Peppa Pig	Police Officer Panda	Animated series
2017–2021	Back	Stephen	Also executive producer
2021	Hey Duggee	Spaceship Computer (voice)	Animated series. In the episode "The Action Hero Badge".
2021	The Cleaner	Terence Redford	Episode 1.2
2022	Rick and Morty	Blond Knight	Season 6, Episode 9, "A Rick in King Mortur's Mort"
2024–present	Ludwig	John "Ludwig" Taylor and James Taylor	Comedy drama series
2025	Mitchell and Webb Are Not Helping	Various characters	Sketch comedy show
2026	Hey A.J.!	Theo	Main role

==== Non-fictional appearances ====
As narrator

- Beauty and the Geek (2006)
- Sci-Fi Saved My Life (2007)
- TV Is Dead? (2007)
- Wonderland – The Secret Life of Norman Wisdom Aged 92¾ (2008)
- Blackadder Exclusive: The Whole Rotten Saga (2008)
- Blackadder's Most Cunning Moments (2008)
- The Real Swiss Family Robinson (2009)
- The Million Pound Bike Ride: A Sport Relief Special (2010)
- Around the World in 90 Minutes (2010)
- Horizon: Dancing in the Dark: The End of Physics? (2015)
- Marks & Spencer Channel 4 Mrs Claus endorsement (2016)

Panel games

- Fanorama – Team captain (2001–2002)
- Does Doug Know? – 2 appearances (2002)
- FAQ U – Host for 5 episodes (2005)
- Have I Got News for You – 17 appearances; 14 times as guest presenter (2005–2018)
- Mock the Week – 11 appearances (2005–2009)
- QI – 32 appearances (2005–2021)
- The Big Fat Quiz of the Year – 9 appearances (2005, 2007, 2009, 2011, 2014, 2015, 2016, 2017, 2020)
- Best of the Worst – Team captain (2006)
- Would I Lie to You? – Team captain (2007–)
- The Big Fat Anniversary Quiz – 1 appearance (2007)
- 8 Out of 10 Cats – 1 appearance (2008)
- You Have Been Watching – 2 appearances (2009–2010)
- The Bubble – host (2010)
- 24 Hour Panel People – 1 appearance (2011)
- The Big Fat Quiz of the '00s – 1 appearance (2012)
- The Big Fat Quiz of the '80s – 1 appearance (2013)
- Only Connect – 1 appearance (2013)
- Was it Something I Said? – host (2013)
- 8 Out of 10 Cats Does Countdown – 8 appearances (2014–2019)
- Outsiders – host (2021)
- LOL: Last One Laughing UK - Contestant; series 2 (2026)

Other programmes

- The 100 Greatest Cartoons (2005)
- Britain's 50 Greatest Comedy Sketches (2005)
- Imagine – 1 appearance (2006)
- TV Heaven, Telly Hell – 1 appearance (2006)
- The Law of the Playground – 7 appearances (2006)
- Friday Night with Jonathan Ross – 2 appearances (2007, 2009)
- The World's Greatest Comedy Characters (2007)
- Dawn French's Boys Who Do Comedy (2007)
- Parkinson – 1 appearance (2007)
- Time Shift – 1 appearance (2007)
- Lily Allen and Friends – 1 appearance (2008)
- The Graham Norton Show – 4 appearances (2008, 2009, 2011, 2013)
- Question Time – 3 appearances (2008, 2009, 2011)
- Who Do You Think You Are? – 1 appearance (2009)
- This Morning – 3 appearances (2009, 2012, 2013)
- The One Show – 2 appearances (2009, 2011)
- Alan Carr: Chatty Man – 2 appearances (2009, 2013)
- Channel 4's Comedy Gala (2010)
- Channel 4's Alternative Election Night – host (2010)
- BBC Breakfast – 5 appearances (2010, 2011, 2012)
- 10 O'Clock Live – Co-host (2011–2013)
- Mark Lawson Talks to... – 1 appearance (2011)
- Ronnie Corbett's Comedy Britain – 1 appearance (2011)
- QI – Genesis (2011)
- Michael McIntyre's Christmas Comedy Roadshow (2011)
- Channel 4's 30 Greatest Comedy Shows (2012)
- The Jonathan Ross Show (2012)
- Goodbye Television Centre (2013)
- The Comedy Vaults: BBC2's Hidden Treasure (2014)
- 50 Years of BBC2 Comedy
- The Last Leg – 2 appearances (2015, 2019)
- Celebrity Gogglebox for su2c – 1 appearance (2020) alongside Victoria Coren Mitchell
- The Great Christmas Bake Off - 5 members of the main Peep Show cast (2025)

=== Podcasts ===
Year	Title	Role	Host	Notes
2009–2012	David Mitchell's Soapbox	Host	David Mitchell	Series of short comedy rants
2012	Richard Herring’s Leicester Square Theatre Podcast	Guest	Richard Herring	Comedy styled interview
2016	Richard Herring’s Leicester Square Theatre Podcast	Guest	Richard Herring	Comedy styled interview
2019	Adam Buxton's Podcast	Guest	Adam Buxton	Ep.89
2020	My Time Capsule	Guest	Michael Fenton Stevens	Ep.38
2020	Podcast Secrets Of the Pharaohs: A Peep Show Podcast	Guest	Tom Harrison and Rob Graham	
2020	Rule Of Three	Guest	Jason Hazeley and Joel Morris	(Remain Indoors Special)
	How To Academy Podcast	Guest	Hannah MacInnes	David Mitchell – Dishonesty is the Second Best Policy
2021	Richard Herring’s Leicester Square Theatre Podcast	Guest	Richard Herring	Comedy styled interview
2022	Brydon &	Guest	Rob Brydon	Interview
2023	Willy Willy Harry Stee...	Guest	Charlie Higson	Historical podcast

=== Radio ===
Year	Title	Role	Station	Notes
2001	Until Morning		BBC Radio 4	Afternoon Play
2001–2005	Think the Unthinkable	Owen	BBC Radio 4	4 series
2003–2013	That Mitchell and Webb Sound	Various	BBC Radio 4	5 series; also writer
2005	Robin and Wendy's Wet Weekends	Kieran, Police Officer	BBC Radio 4	Series 4, Episode 3,
2006	Vent	John Dee	BBC Radio 4	
2007	Daydream Believers	Ray	BBC Radio 2	Pilot
2008	Bleak Expectations	Reverend Fecund	BBC Radio 4	3 appearances
2009	The Death of Grass	Narrator	BBC Radio 4	
2014	Blocked	Felix	BBC Radio 4	
2017	Time Spanner	Daniel Kraken	BBC Radio 4	Pilot
2022	Severus	Sammonicus	BBC Radio 4	BBC Studio Drama

==== Non-fictional appearances ====
Year	Title	Role	Station	Notes
2006–	The Unbelievable Truth	Host	BBC Radio 4	31 series
2008–2025	Heresy	Panellist	BBC Radio 4	12 appearances
2009-2010	Just a Minute	Guest	BBC Radio 4	4 appearances
2009	Desert Island Discs	Guest	BBC Radio 4	1 appearance
2009	The News Quiz	Guest	BBC Radio 4	1 appearance
2009-2011	I'm Sorry I Haven't A Clue	Panellist	BBC Radio 4	6 appearances
2013	Radio 2's History of British Comedy	Narrator	BBC Radio 2	
2016	Behaving Ourselves: Mitchell on Manners	Narrator	BBC Radio 4	4 episodes
2021	Mitchell on Meetings	Narrator	BBC Radio 4	3 episodes

=== Audiobooks ===
Year	Title	Role	Author	Notes
2012	Back Story: A Memoir	Author and Narrator	David Mitchell	autobiography
2017	Oi Frog!	Narrator	Kes Gray	
2017	Oi Dog!	Narrator	Kes Gray	
2017	Oi Cat!	Narrator	Kes Gray	
2017	How Many Legs?	Narrator	Kes Gray	
2017	Quick Quack Quentin	Narrator	Kes Gray	
2018	Oi Duck-billed Platypus!	Narrator	Kes Gray	
2019	Oi Puppies!	Narrator	Kes Gray	
2019	Thinking About It Only Makes It Worse	Author and Narrator	David Mitchell	Hardcover source published 2014
2020	Oi Aardvark!	Narrator	Kes Gray	
2023	Unruly: A History Of England’s Kings and Queens	Author and Narrator	David Mitchell	

== Bibliography ==
Year	Title	Notes
2009	This Mitchell and Webb Book	Co-author with Robert Webb; comedy book
2012	Back Story: A Memoir	Autobiography
2014	Thinking About It Only Makes It Worse	
2019	Dishonesty Is the Second-Best Policy: And Other Rules to Live By	
2023	Unruly: A History Of England’s Kings and Queens	History and comedy book
