= Was It Something I Said? (panel show) =

2013 British TV panel show

- Genre: Comedy panel game
- Directed by: Barbara Wiltshire
- Presented by: David Mitchell
- Starring: Team captains Richard Ayoade; Micky Flanagan
- Narrated by: Guest narrators
- Theme music composer: Ephraim Greenland
- Country of origin: United Kingdom
- Original language: English
- No. of series: 1
- No. of episodes: 8 (list of episodes)

Production
- Producer: Arron Ferster
- Production location: The Maidstone Studios
- Editors: Steve Andrews; Tim Ellison
- Running time: 30 minutes (inc. adverts)
- Production companies: Maverick Television; That Mitchell & Webb Company

Original release
- Network: Channel 4
- Release: 6 October – 24 November 2013

Was It Something I Said? is a British comedy panel show that was broadcast on Channel 4, presented by David Mitchell and featuring team captains Richard Ayoade and Micky Flanagan. Celebrity guest narrators appeared in each episode, including David Harewood, Phil Daniels, Charles Dance and Mariella Frostrup.

The show was spun off from the Quotables website, commissioned by Adam Gee at Channel 4 in collaboration with the Arts Council England in 2011. The programme included a play-along second screen game based entirely on Twitter.

== Rounds ==
=== Threesomes ===
The panel had to guess which of three celebrities said a particular quote read out by the guest narrator. The same celebrity could have more than one quote. At the end of this round, Mitchell asked the home viewers to complete a famous quote via Twitter, and upon return from the commercial break, asked the panel to complete it.

=== Key Words ===
The panelists were given only specific key words and must complete the entire quotation. For example, the words "score" and "seven" would lead to Abraham Lincoln's famous opening line from the Gettysburg Address, "Four score and seven years ago, our fathers brought forth on this continent a new nation, conceived in liberty and dedicated to the proposition that all men are created equal."

=== What Are They Talking About? ===
A quote was given completely out of context and the panelists had to determine the context of why the quote was said.

=== Was It Something I Said? ===
Teams played one at a time and have to determine if the quote was said by either of the opposing team members, David Mitchell, the guest narrator, or a "virtual TV guest" (random celebrity).

== Episode guide ==
The coloured backgrounds denote the result of each of the shows:

– Indicates Micky's team won.
– Indicates Richard's team won.
– Indicates the game ended in a draw.

Episode	Original broadcast (extended version)	Micky's team	Richard's team	Scores (extended)	Guest narrator
1	6 October 2013; 11 October 2013	Charlie Higson	Jimmy Carr	1–2; 2–3	David Harewood
2	13 October 2013 18 October 2013	Gabby Logan	Ed Byrne	2–2 2–3	Phil Daniels
3	20 October 2013; 25 October 2013	Romesh Ranganathan	Jason Manford	2–4; 3–4	Mariella Frostrup
4	27 October 2013; 1 November 2013	Katherine Ryan	Bob Mortimer	2–5; 3–5	Brian Blessed
5	3 November 2013; 8 November 2013	Robert Webb	Miles Jupp	4–2; 5–3	Charles Dance
6	10 November 2013 15 November 2013	Sally Phillips	Reginald D. Hunter	3–3 6–4	John Sergeant
7	17 November 2013 22 November 2013	Rhod Gilbert	Josie Long	3–5 5–5	John Craven
8	24 November 2013; 29 November 2013	Vic Reeves	Josh Widdicombe	3–3; 3–3	Kirsty Wark
