= Best of the Worst (game show) =

- Genre: Panel game show; Comedy
- Presented by: Alexander Armstrong
- Starring: David Mitchell; Johnny Vaughan
- Country of origin: United Kingdom
- Original language: English
- No. of series: 1
- No. of episodes: 6

Production
- Producer: 4DTV
- Running time: 24 minutes

Original release
- Network: Channel 4
- Release: 1 September – 6 October 2006

Best of the Worst is a British panel game television programme, which was broadcast on Channel 4 in 2006. The show was created by Giles Pilbrow and Colin Swash.

Hosted by Alexander Armstrong, it featured two teams of two players, one captained by David Mitchell and the other by Johnny Vaughan. The other panellists were either comedians or well known television personalities.

The show looked at the worst things ever to happen in the world, such as the person with the worst luck, the worst diet, or the worst inventions.

Only 6 episodes were recorded.

== Rounds ==
Best of the Worst was made up of four rounds.

- Pick the Worst: Both teams picked the worst out of four options, such as the worst diet out of fast food, fresh air, a car and human flesh. Then, from the two options chosen by each team, the audience voted for which they thought was the worst. The team whose option received the most votes won two points.
- Bottom Five: The five worst things related to a subject were given in reverse order, from least bad to the worst. Each team had to try to guess what the thing was via a picture clue. One point was given for each correct answer.
- Which ends the Worst?: Two video clips were shown, each one ending badly, but stopped before the event. Each team then had to guess which one ended the worst. Two points were given for the right answer.
- Wall of Worst: A quick-fire buzzer round, where a subject was given, along with a picture clue related to the worst thing ever to happen related to that subject. Each team had to buzz in with what they thought had happened. One point was awarded for every right answer.

== Episode list ==
– indicates David's team won.
– indicates Johnny's team won.

No.	Directed by	David's team	Johnny's team	Original release date	Score
1	Geraldine Dowd	Rob Rouse	Jayne Middlemiss	1 September 2006	5–6
2	Paul Wheeler	Robert Webb	Trisha Goddard	8 September 2006	1–9
3	Paul Wheeler	Fearne Cotton	Mel Giedroyc	15 September 2006	5–6
4	Geraldine Dowd	Frankie Boyle	Brian McFadden	22 September 2006	3–9
5	Paul Wheeler	Alan Carr	Sara Cox	29 September 2006	6–10
6	Geraldine Dowd	Paddy McGuinness	Liza Tarbuck	6 October 2006	7–6
