= The Law of the Playground =

- Starring: Various
- Country of origin: United Kingdom
- Original language: English
- No. of series: 2
- No. of episodes: 13

Production
- Running time: 30 minutes

Original release
- Network: Channel 4
- Release: 21 July 2006 – 7 March 2008

The Law of the Playground is a British television series broadcast on Channel 4 produced by Zeppotron in which various British comedians and celebrities recollect the past times of childhood at school. Throughout the series many different aspects of school life are brought up such as bullies, punishment, games, etc.

It was based on the book of the same title by Jonathan Blyth, which in turn was based on the website playgroundlaw.com, which aggregated playground insults and anecdotes.

== Celebrities ==
The series included the following celebrities:

- Kerry Godliman
- Paddy McGuinness
- Vic Reeves
- Frankie Boyle
- Christian O'Connell
- Lucy Montgomery
- Karen Taylor
- Rhys Thomas
- Alan Carr
- Mark Dolan
- Iain Lee
- Olivia Lee
- Lee Mack
- David Mitchell
- Alex Zane
- David Baddiel
- Josie D'Arby
- Fay Ripley
- Jamelia
- Jason Byrne
- Jason Manford
- Kevin Bishop
- Colin Murray
- Myleene Klass
- Tom Price
- Richard Bacon
- Robert Webb
- Russell Howard
- Sean Hughes
- Thaila Zucchi
- Dom Joly
- Dominic Wood
- Mathew Horne
- June Sarpong
- Jayne Middlemiss
- Michael McIntyre
- Barunka O'Shaughnessy
- Rob Rouse
- Rufus Hound
- Shappi Khorsandi
- Stephen K. Amos
- Tara Palmer-Tomkinson
- Natalie Casey
- Paul Kaye
- Debra Stephenson
- Tom Allen
- Dan Atkinson
- Craig Hill
- Justin Lee Collins

== Episode list ==
=== Season 1 (2006) ===
#	Airdate
1	21 July 2006
2	28 July 2006
3	4 August 2006
4	11 August 2006
5	25 August 2006
6	1 September 2006
7	8 September 2006

=== Season 2 (2008) ===
#	Airdate
1	1 February 2008
2	8 February 2008
3	15 February 2008
4	22 February 2008
5	29 February 2008
6	7 March 2008
