= Back Story (autobiography) =

Book by David Mitchell

- First edition
- Author: David Mitchell
- Language: English
- Subject: Biography
- Publisher: HarperCollins
- Publication date: 11 October 2012
- Media type: Hardcover, paperback, audiobook
- Pages: 326
- ISBN: 978-0-00-735172-5 (first edition, hardcover)
- OCLC: 794136103

Back Story is an autobiography by British actor, comedian, and writer David Mitchell. The book was published in October 2012. The book entails stories about Mitchell's childhood, schooling and career as a television personality, including personal anecdotes, rants, political commentary and pictures.

== Synopsis ==
The book revolves around a walk in Kilburn, London, on which Mitchell reflects on his childhood, university experiences and career. The book title is also a play-on-words, as Mitchell talks about the problems with his back.

== Contents ==
1. Introduction
2. The Fawlty Towers Years
3. Inventing Fleet Street
4. Light-houses, My Boy!
5. Summoning Servants
6. The Pianist and the Fisherman
7. Death of a Monster
8. Civis Britannicus Sum
9. The Mystery of the Unexplained Pole
10. Beatings and Crisps
11. The Smell of the Crowd
12. Cross-Dressing, Cards and Cocaine
13. Presidents of the Galaxy
14. Badges
15. Play It Nice and Cool, Son
16. Teenage Thrills: First Love, and the Rotary Club Public Speaking Competition
17. Where Did You Get That Hat?
18. I Am Not a Cider Drinker
19. Enthusiasm in Basements
20. God Is Love
21. The Cause of and Answer to All of Life's Problems
22. Attention
23. Mitchell and Webb
24. We Said We Wouldn’t Look Back
25. The Lager's Just Run Out
26. Real Comic Talent
27. Going Fishing
28. Causes of Celebration
29. The Magician
30. Are You Sitting Down?
31. Peep Show
32. Being Myself
33. Lovely Spam, Wonderful Spam
34. The Work–Work Balance
35. The End of the Beginning
36. Centred

== Reception ==
The book received generally positive reviews. The Guardian stated that it was an honest memoir, different from other celebrity memoirs and one that would resonate greatly with readers.
