= Bruiser (TV series) =

British sketch comedy series

- Genre: Alternative comedy; black comedy; insult comedy
- Directed by: Nick Jones
- Starring: David Mitchell; Robert Webb; Olivia Colman; Matt Holness; Martin Freeman; Charlotte Hudson
- Theme music composer: Nick Love
- Country of origin: United Kingdom
- Original language: English
- No. of series: 1
- No. of episodes: 6

Production
- Executive producer: Jon Plowman
- Producer: David Tomlinson
- Camera setup: Jim O'Donnell

Original release
- Network: BBC Two
- Release: 28 February – 15 March 2000

Bruiser is a British comedy sketch television show that was produced for BBC Two. It premiered on 28 February 2000 and ran for six episodes, ending on 15 March 2000. The principal writers were David Mitchell and Robert Webb. Additional writers included Richard Ayoade and Ricky Gervais.

The BBC writes, "And if the series itself is not widely remembered, it's notable not least for bringing together an immensely talented group of young performers who have since joined the 'A' list of British comedians."

In addition to Mitchell and Webb, cast members included Olivia Colman, Martin Freeman, Matthew Holness and Charlotte Hudson. Due to much of the cast's later popularity, the show has achieved cult status.

== Sketches ==
- Two Writers: (Webb and Colman) pitch surreal ideas for television shows to Alan Titchmarsh's agent (Mitchell).
- Outdoor Wee: Television host Keith (Holness) interviews celebrities one-on-one (played by Mitchell, Webb, Colman, and Freeman) whilst the two urinate outdoors at a unique location around Britain, on a TV programme called "Outdoor Wee".
- I'm Not A...: A hapless, paranoid man (Freeman) mentally over-analyses the situations he stumbles into and worries that he looks like he has perverted intentions. He then panics and shouts out loud something he's not doing, to the bewilderment of people around him.
- All Pile On: An obese man with a high-pitched voice (Holness) seizes any opportunity to call out "All pile on!" when he comes across someone lying on a flat surface in public, causing a group of strangers to appear and stack themselves on the unsuspecting victim.
- Q: A James Bond spoof in which inventor Q (Mitchell) shows off new "weapons" to James Bond (Freeman) which are mostly ordinary objects. Q never demonstrates them properly. Instead, he takes out his fury on a dummy by punching and kicking an imaginary enemy.
- Sparky: A mischievous puppet named Sparky (voiced by Webb) constantly pranks and publicly humiliates his human friend Roger (Freeman).
- Pussy on a Stick: A suave Australian man (Holness) boasts about various hobbies he participates in to pick up women, including lawn bowls, choir singing, and grave tending, calling them "Pussy on a stick."
- Touchy Builder: A builder (Holness) becomes extremely angry about being called "touchy" by his workmate (Freeman).
- Bickering Couple: A married couple, Gary and Samantha (Freeman and Colman), constantly argue about Gary's faddish new interests such as converting to Islam, claiming to be gay, or a fear of being murdered.
- Sasha Solomon: An American TV journalist (Colman) viciously offends British actors and actresses during interviews with them, while backhandedly complimenting the UK as being enlightened enough to embrace actors that Americans would never accept.
- Hollywood Interviews: A Hollywood celebrity interviewer (Mitchell) interviews celebrities at their homes and makes irrelevant, opinionated remarks. At the same time, he constantly fears offending them.
- Steve: A cautiously exploitative man (Webb), who uses hypothetical scenarios and draws logically extreme conclusions with his friends and coworkers to take gross advantage of their offers.
- A group of French artists, who carry puppets and remark about dead artists in black and white sketches. The sketch is a parody of French new wave films.
- Do You Do Poison?: A fast-paced, tense and inquisitive man (Webb) barges into businesses asking for poison and other outlandish means of killing his wife, but proclaims his innocence whenever the business employee questions his intentions.
- IT Guy: An IT worker (Holness) within the office who consistently uses vulgar, vague language to explain and condescend to his colleagues on PC hardware and software.
- Girl Talk: A pair of female friends (Colman and Hudson) discuss sexual habits in a bar, constantly finishing each other's sentences until Colman's character says something different or unusual, causing Hudson's character to be disgusted.
- A man (Freeman) attempts to impress a woman (Colman) by doing silly things from a distance, then eventually injures himself or others in the process.
- Workers in an office fall victim to childish pranks, before lamenting to the camera the inconvenience it has brought them.
- Condescending Worker: A frustrated, angry, and sarcastic man (Mitchell) who works in various roles (e.g. bartender, plumber, paramedic) acts condescendingly and insultingly towards the people he is serving. He proves himself utterly incompetent at the task at hand and angrily berates himself.
- BBC Knowledge Fun Size: A parody of the BBC's Bitesize TV series. Presenters (Webb and Hudson) give banal A-Level revision "lessons" on subjects such as French, Geography, and Philosophy, consisting entirely of useless, irrelevant or incorrect information.
- Cultured Dilettante: A man (Freeman) tries to convince his friends (Holness and Hudson) that he is cultured and knowledgeable in areas such as modern art, jazz, and ballet.
- Two police officers: (Mitchell and Webb) go about their duties for a documentary-style show. Webb's character has great difficulty explaining very simple concepts to the viewer, and is at times incompetent at his job. Mitchell plays a brooding, violent policeman of few words.

== Series writing credits ==
- Russell Young
- Richard Parker
- Jason Doll-Steinberg
- David Tomlinson
- Daniel Lander
- Richard Ayoade
- Bathsheba Doran
- James Bachman
- Ricky Gervais
- David Mitchell
- Robert Webb

== Reception ==
In The Times (Times 2 arts section), Caitlin Moran praised the cast, predicting that Martin Freeman is "a future star – he'll be getting all the roles Robert Carlyle turns down within the next three years," and adding that "fellow thesp Olivia Colman deserves to go with him." She highlighted Robert Webb’s “greater comedy characters,” including “a touchy Satan” plagued by wrong-number callers ("NO! NOT STEVE! THE BEAST!”) and a puppet named Sparky who declares that "Dr Twinky at the toy shop told me going blind makes you deaf."

The Telegraph included it on their list of the "10 Great Forgotten Comedy Shows".

The i Paper featured Bruiser in an article headlined "The most important comedy TV series you've never heard of."

== DVD release ==
The series was released on DVD on 23 July 2007.
