= That Mitchell and Webb Look =

British sketch comedy show

- An image from the show's opening sequence
- Also known as: Mitchell & Webb
- Genre: Sketch comedy
- Created by: David Mitchell; Robert Webb
- Written by: David Mitchell; Robert Webb; James Bachman; Mark Evans; Jesse Armstrong; Sam Bain; John Finnemore; Chris Reddy; Toby Davies; Abigail Burdess; Jonathan Dryden-Taylor; Simon Kane
- Directed by: David Kerr; Ben Gosling Fuller
- Starring: David Mitchell; Robert Webb; Sarah Hadland; James Bachman; Olivia Colman; Mark Evans; Jo Neary; Paterson Joseph; Abigail Burdess; Daniel Kaluuya
- Composers: Richie Webb; Matt Katz
- Country of origin: United Kingdom
- Original language: English
- No. of series: 4
- No. of episodes: 24

Production
- Executive producers: Kenton Allen; Mark Freeland; Jon Plowman; Paul Schlesinger
- Producer: Gareth Edwards
- Cinematography: Rob Kitzmann; John Sorapure
- Editors: Pete Drinkwater; Scott Flyger; Gary Hewson
- Running time: 30 minutes

Original release
- Network: BBC Two; BBC HD (2008–2010)
- Release: 14 September 2006 – 17 August 2010

Related
- The Mitchell and Webb Situation; That Mitchell and Webb Sound

That Mitchell and Webb Look is a British sketch comedy television series starring David Mitchell and Robert Webb that ran from 2006 to 2010. Many of its characters and sketches were first featured in the duo's radio show That Mitchell and Webb Sound.

As well as Mitchell and Webb themselves, the writers include Jesse Armstrong, James Bachman, Sam Bain, Mark Evans, Olivia Colman, Joel Morris, John Finnemore, Simon Kane. It was produced by Gareth Edwards. Colman, Bachman, and Evans were also members of the cast, alongside Gus Brown, Sarah Hadland, Daniel Kaluuya and Paterson Joseph. The first two series were directed by David Kerr, and the third and fourth series were directed by Ben Gosling Fuller.

First aired on 14 September 2006, a second series was commissioned later that same year and was broadcast between 21 February and 27 March 2008. The third series began on 11 June 2009. Since the second series, the production has also been broadcast on BBC HD. The first series won a BAFTA award in 2007. The third series began airing on BBC America on 14 April 2010. The fourth series premiered on BBC Two and BBC HD on 13 July 2010 with a total of six episodes commissioned by the BBC. In a November 2011 interview, Webb stated that there were no plans for another series and added that "you'd have to ask the BBC" about further series.

== Recurring sketches ==
That Mitchell and Webb Look includes recurring sketches, or sketches with recurring themes. Some of those that feature in multiple episodes include:

- Numberwang: A "maths quiz" game show in which two contestants, Simon and Julie (Paterson Joseph and Olivia Colman), call out numbers until the host (Webb) declares "That's Numberwang." The rules of the game are left completely unexplained to the viewer, and appear to follow no logic whatsoever, to the point that sometimes the gameplay even seems to contradict itself. What Numberwang actually means is never revealed. Sketches included a spin-off word-based game called Wordwang, a German adaptation called Nümberwang, a trailer for The Numberwang Code (a parody of The Da Vinci Code), an advert for a Numberwang board game and a documentary on the history of Numberwang.
- Ted and Peter: a pair of alcoholic, chain-smoking snooker commentators and retired players. Ted Wilkes is played by David Mitchell and Peter DeCoursey by Robert Webb. They tell insensitive stories about the (generally fictional) players, bringing up things such as one player's attempts at suicide and another's sexuality, rather than focusing on the game (other than Ted's occasional comment of "Oh and that's a bad miss!"). They also drink heavily throughout the sketch. By Series 4, the commentating careers of Ted and Peter have taken a downward turn, being forced to commentate on Late Night Dog Poker on Dave.
- The Surprising Adventures of Sir Digby Chicken Caesar: a drunken, drug-addled homeless man (Webb), who is under the delusion that he is a brilliant and intrepid detective or adventurer, dressed in a manner reminiscent of Sherlock Holmes. He and his companion Ginger (Mitchell) commit various crimes whilst supposedly engaging in battle against the henchmen of their so-called "nemesis", in the style of Dick Barton. SnorriCam is used in parts of the sketches.
- The Quiz Broadcast: a post-apocalyptic television quiz show hosted by Mitchell (who repeatedly reminds viewers to "remain indoors") and transmitted by the British Emergency Broadcasting System in an underground bunker where resources are dwindling and society is rapidly declining. The show is being aired in the immediate years after "The Event", an unexplained disaster that killed most of humanity and left the survivors with little memory of the world pre-Event. Basic necessities like food and fuel are featured as prizes. The sickly contestants on the show are survivors "trying to enjoy themselves" whilst avoiding any traumatic memories of "the Event", while living in fear of a cannibalistic race known as "Them".
- Get Me Hennimore!: a parody of 1970s sitcoms, each episode featuring the nervous Hennimore (Webb) being given two important tasks by his boss (Mitchell), which are easy to confuse: for instance, they may be based on two organisations with identical initials. The sketches always end with Hennimore mixing the tasks up and the boss shouting "Hennimore!" angrily and his glasses gratuitously breaking.
- The Conspirators: A trio of MI6 agents (Mitchell, Webb and Hadland) who discuss how to enact various events popularly believed to have been orchestrated by conspiracy theories, such as the moon landing and the death of Diana, Princess of Wales, in the process inadvertently pointing out how implausible it is for such events to have been conspiratorially orchestrated.
- The Lazy Film Writers: Two inept and lazy writers (Mitchell and Webb) discuss their new project in a documentary-like fashion. They do not research any of their projects, and as a result end up with overly simplistic dialogue and characters or glaring inaccuracies. On one occasion, they did not revise the scripts for a legal drama after the death of the lead actor.

== Production ==
The show follows on from the duo's earlier TV series The Mitchell and Webb Situation, and is an extension of their Radio 4 sketch show That Mitchell and Webb Sound. The show's producer Gareth Edwards commented that the show's pitch to the BBC "was the shortest pitch I've ever written", citing that the show "has worked on the radio, just like Little Britain worked on the radio and Dead Ringers worked on the radio, and they transferred successfully to TV, so why don't you [the BBC] transfer this one to TV as well?"

A pilot for the show was filmed on 27 January 2006 at BBC Television Centre, with a full series being later commissioned. Preview nights for the show were held at The Drill Hall in London on 11 January and 20 March 2006, and at Ginglik in Shepherd's Bush in London on 14 and 21 May 2006. These took the form of a radio recording, with verbal prompting to the audience for any visual element that would be required. The series was shot on location in June 2006 and three audience recording sessions were held in Studio 4 at BBC Television Centre on 14, 21 and 28 July 2006.

Following the first series, the pair went on a tour of 44 UK venues between October and December 2006, entitled The Two Faces of Mitchell and Webb, featuring many of the same sketches as That Mitchell and Webb Look.

A preview night for the second series was held on 18 May 2007 at The Drill Hall in London. This series was shot in high-definition on location during June/July 2007 and three studio recordings with an audience were held at TC8 in Television Centre on 3, 10 and 17 August 2007.

Two preview nights for series three were announced on 30 June 2008 on the BBC Tickets website; all tickets were booked in less than 24 hours. The first preview night took place on 13 July 2008 at The Drill Hall, with the second held there on 10 August 2008. Two audience recording sessions at Television Centre – with additional live sketches – were announced on 3 October 2008, and took place on 31 October and 7 November 2008, again in high-definition in studio TC8. A third recording session at the BBC Radio Theatre was announced on 10 October 2008, taking place on 18 November 2008.

A preview night for the fourth series was announced on 18 November 2009 on the BBC Tickets website; this was held on 26 November 2009 at The Drill Hall.

=== Podcast ===
In a 2020 episode of the podcast Rule of Three, David Mitchell, Jason Hazeley and Jonathan Dryden-Taylor discussed several of the series four sketches. The series had a bleaker tone, contributing factors potentially including the public mood after the 2008 financial crisis, inspiration from the writers' upbringings during fears of nuclear warfare, and an increase in the prominence of dramas at the time.

A series of sketches labelled "After the Event" or "Post-Apocalyptic Gameshow", later to be known as "Remain Indoors", featured in three series three episodes and each of the six series four episodes. The last six episodes were devised in the writers' room and then written by Mitchell, Hazeley, Dryden-Taylor and Joel Morris, who divided into pairs and wrote three episodes apiece. Though Mitchell said he was uncomfortable with it in 2020, reference is made in the sketches to all the children having died in the apocalypse, an idea independently conceived by both pairs of writers.

Mitchell's character's suit becomes increasingly damaged throughout the episodes. The character Sheila seems to believe that society will return to normal if people continue practising pre-Event routines in a ritualistic fashion, such as producing game shows. Mitchell linked this to another sketch conceived by the writers in which inhabitants of Pompeii begin to frantically recycle after the nearby volcano erupts.

Another sketch about a spaceship employee who returns from a sick day to find all of his colleagues involved in a religion referencing a deity called "Vectron" was taken from an occurrence during the writing process. During a break, several of the writers were playing with a ball and one began shouting "By Vectron!" in the style of the Galaxy Quest catchphrase "By Grabthar's Hammer!" Another writer returned from the bathroom to find the writers making many references to the unknown entity Vectron.

== Reception ==
The show was nominated for two British Comedy Awards in 2006, in the categories of "Britain's Best New TV Comedy" and the "Highland Spring People's Choice"; it won neither of the awards. Nevertheless, the show did go on to receive a BAFTA in 2007, in the category "Best Comedy Programme or Series"; it was later nominated for another BAFTA in 2009, in the same category. The show was also named "Best British TV Sketch Show 2006" at The Comedy.co.uk Awards.

A scene on the show during which Mitchell and Webb portrayed Waffen-SS officers with one asking the other "Hans, are we the baddies?" later became a popular Internet meme in the early 2020s.

The recurring Quiz Broadcast sketch in the third and fourth series, with the recurring opening line "Hello, good evening, and remain indoors!", was widely referenced in early 2020 when social distancing measures were introduced to combat the COVID-19 pandemic.

In 2026, all episodes of the series were made available again on BBC iPlayer to mark the show's 20th anniversary. Shortly after this re-release, several episodes were edited by the BBC to remove 11 sketches which the corporation said would no longer "work today", including depictions of blackface.

== DVD release ==
All four series of the show have been released on DVD, all released through different distributors under license from the BBC.

The first series was released on DVD in the UK by Contender Home Entertainment on 29 October 2007. Extras include Outtakes, Behind the Scenes footage and a Mitchell & Webb documentary.

The second series was released on DVD in the UK by FremantleMedia on 20 October 2008.

The third series was released on DVD in the UK by 2Entertain on 20 July 2009.

The fourth series was released in the UK by FremantleMedia on 4 October 2010.

== Worldwide broadcast ==
Region	Channel
Arab League	ShowComedy
Argentina	Film&Arts/i-Sat
Brazil	Film&Arts
Australia	ABC1 / ABC2 / UKTV
Belgium	Canvas
Colombia	Film&Arts
Denmark	DR2
Finland	Sub
Iceland	Stöð 2
India	BBC Entertainment
Israel	yes Comedy
Netherlands	Nederland 3
New Zealand	UKTV
Norway	NRK3
Singapore	StarHub Cable Vision
South Africa	BBC Entertainment
Sweden	TV4 Komedi
United Kingdom	BBC2 / BBC HD / Dave / Netflix
United States	BBC America / Hulu / Netflix

== See also ==
- Mitchell and Webb Are Not Helping
