= Ambassadors (TV series) =

2013 British TV comedy-drama series

- Also known as: Our Men
- Genre: Comedy-drama
- Written by: James Wood; Rupert Walters
- Directed by: Jeremy Webb
- Starring: David Mitchell; Robert Webb; Keeley Hawes; Matthew Macfadyen; Velibor Topic; Yigal Naor; Susan Lynch; Amara Karan; Shivani Ghai; Natalia Tena; Debbie Chazen
- Composer: Daniel Pemberton
- Country of origin: United Kingdom
- Original languages: English; Russian "Tazbek"
- No. of series: 1
- No. of episodes: 3

Production
- Executive producers: Kenton Allen; Luke Alkin; Matthew Justice; David Mitchell; Robert Webb; Chris Sussman
- Producer: Chris Carey
- Production locations: Bursa; United Kingdom
- Editor: Chrispin Green
- Running time: 60 minutes
- Production companies: Big Talk Productions; BBC Comedy

Original release
- Network: BBC Two; BBC Two HD
- Release: 23 October – 6 November 2013

Ambassadors is a three-episode British comedy-drama television serial that ran on BBC Two in 2013. Ambassadors follows the lives of the employees of the British embassy in the fictional Central Asian nation of Tazbekistan.

== Cast ==
Britons

- David Mitchell as Keith Davis, the British Ambassador to Tazbekistan
- Robert Webb as Neil Tilly, the Deputy Head of Mission
- Keeley Hawes as Jennifer, the Ambassador's wife and a physician
- Matthew Macfadyen as the Foreign Office official (known as POD, for "Prince of Darkness")
- Susan Lynch as Caitlin, the Head of Consular Affairs
- Amara Karan as Isabel, the Trade and Political Secretary
- Michael Smiley as Mr. Jackson (also known as "Mister 21"), a Foreign Office interrogation specialist
- Henry Lloyd-Hughes as Simon Broughton, a human rights activist
- Elliot Cowan as Stephen Pembridge, a solo performance actor
- Tom Hollander as Prince Mark, a minor British royal
- Julian Lewis Jones as Mike Treasure, Prince Mark's valet and "security man"

Tazbekis

- Velibor Topic as Svecko, an Interior Ministry official
- Yigal Naor as President Karzak of the Republic of Tazbekistan
- Richard Katz as Jamatt, second-in-charge to Karzak
- Natalia Tena as Tanya, Neil's Tazbek girlfriend and a barmaid
- George Lasha as the tall surveillance man
- Sevan Stephan as the short surveillance man
- Danny Scheinmann as a guide
- Krystian Godlewski as Amil Zarifi, a dissident
- Umit Ulgen as Oybek Yerzhan, Tanya's brother and a rebel
- Lydia Leonard as Fergana Karzak, the daughter of President Karzak

Embassy Tazbekis

- Shivani Ghai as Natalia, the Head of Public Relations
- Debbie Chazen as Ludmilla, the embassy housekeeper
- Andy Lucas as Sergei, the embassy driver
- Jenny Galloway as Mrs. Petrova, the ambassador's Tazbeki language tutor

Others

- Oliver Dimsdale as the French Ambassador to Tazbekistan
- Lachele Carl as Petra, the American Ambassador to Tazbekistan

== Production ==
Cast of Ambassadors (left to right) Shivani Ghai, Amara Karan, David Mitchell, Robert Webb, Susan Lynch

On 23 August 2012, BBC Two's controller Janice Hadlow announced the commissioning of the limited television serial, by herself and Cheryl Taylor, the controller of BBC comedy commissioning. The series went into production in January 2013.

Robert Webb said: "It's sort of Yes, Prime Minister meets Spooks at a bad disco". David Mitchell said: "It's credible, hopefully funny at times, but serious at times. It was very nice to do something in a slightly different genre. It was nice to do a bit of acting alongside all my sitting in a sparkly chair telling a joke."

Part of the series was filmed in Bursa in western Turkey. According to AZ Celtic Films, Bursa was chosen because of its diversity and closeness to Istanbul, which is called the "hub of the film industry". The series received help from the Turkish military and the local airport, where filming took two days. The Foreign and Commonwealth Office (FCO) allowed the cast to run a read-through in one of its grandest rooms.

James Wood, the co-writer of the series said "The stories we were told by diplomats were very closely reflected in the series. We ended up with 200 pages of research" and that a week was spent in Kazakhstan with the Ambassador there. According to Craig Murray, the former ambassador to Uzbekistan, Big Talk Productions tried to buy the rights to his book, Murder in Samarkand, for a film and believes the series, a "state-sponsored satire", is based on it. In his opinion, the FCO had backed it to "defuse the horror of our alliance with Uzbekistan and make it banal, accepted and safe".

The title sequence for the show was created by Joe Berger and Pascal Wyse. Throughout the series the Union Flag always appears upside-down: in the title sequence, outside the embassy and on the ambassador's Land Rover. When the flag is flown upside down it means that the position flying it is in distress.

== Episodes ==
No.	Title	Directed by	Written by	Original release date	UK viewers (millions)
1	"The Rabbit Never Escapes"	Jeremy Webb	James Wood and Rupert Walters	23 October 2013	1.67
Ambassador Keith Davis (David Mitchell) and his deputy Neil Tilly (Robert Webb) attempt to secure a profitable military helicopter contract for a British company. Things go awry when Keith accidentally shoots an ibex, Tazbekistan's national animal, while on a hunting trip with President Karzak (Igal Naor). Meanwhile, Neil attempts to help Simon Broughton, a British activist imprisoned for criticizing the regime's human rights abuses and is now facing the death penalty for false charges. The embassy's Best of British festival fails to win over the natives when pompous actor Stephen Pembridge gives a terrible performance and sexually harasses Natalia, the Head of Public Relations. Keith's wife, Jennifer, manages to get him a private meeting with the President to discuss the helicopters. Despite Keith's best efforts, Britain loses the helicopter contract to France. Keith gets the charges against Simon dropped, though Simon shows little gratitude. The embassy send Simon and Stephen back to the UK.
2	"The Prince's Trousers"	Jeremy Webb	James Wood and Rupert Walters	30 October 2013	1.00 (overnight)
Prince Mark of Bath (Tom Hollander), a minor royal, travels to Tazbekistan in his capacity as trade envoy and soon makes himself unpopular with his demands on the embassy staff. His arrival coincides with the escape of one of the country's most celebrated and outspoken dissidents, the blind Amil Zarifi, who asks for sanctuary in the embassy. Neil takes the initiative to bring him into the compound, which not only incenses Keith but also infuriates the Tazbeks. A Tazbek government agent presses Neil to reveal UK secrets and threatens Neil’s girlfriend, Tanya. Prince Mark meets Zarifi by chance and is made sympathetic to the issue of child labour abuses in Tazbekistan. Unexpectedly, Prince Mark convinces the President to address the issue. Zarifi is allowed to emigrate to the UK. Neil realizes the Tazbeks kicked up a fuss for appearance's sake, but are happy to be rid of Zarifi.
3	"The Tazbek Spring"	Jeremy Webb	James Wood and Rupert Walters	6 November 2013	0.90 (overnight)
While celebrating the Tazbek president's Platinum Jubilee (which is only 20 years in Tazbekistan), gunfire erupts on the streets. Worried that this is the start of the "Tazbek Spring" (a reference to the Arab Spring), the UK ambassadors must decide whether to back the rebels or the government. At the same time, the Foreign Office vetting officer arrives from Guantanamo Bay detention camp to evaluate the embassy staff. He earns fans among the Tazbeks, who respect his emotionally manipulative interrogation tactics. Keith attempts to meet with the rebels in the mountains, only to be kidnapped with the French Ambassador. They are saved by British special forces, which are helping Tazbek soldiers suppress the rebellion. Tanya becomes a target of the Tazbek government due to her brother's connections to the rebels, and Neil barely manages to get her out of the country. After the rebellion has been suppressed, Keith and Neil are informed that they will be visited by the Foreign Office official soon.

== Reception ==
=== Ratings ===
Overnight figures showed that the first episode attracted 1.21 million viewers on BBC Two. It was watched by 5.4% of television viewers during its original broadcast. The second episode saw an audience share of 4.5%.

=== Critical reception ===
According to Alison Graham of the Radio Times: "There are some funny bits, but it's a drama with a light touch, rather than an out-and-out comedy. Not that there's anything wrong with that, as this is an engaging, even winning, hour." The Daily Telegraph journalist Jake Wallis Simons commented that "the two leading actors, Messrs David Mitchell and Robert Webb, brought the thing alive." Mitchell's character, he wrote, "was a wonderfully explosive and strait-laced character, who thought nothing of placing the sale of British military helicopters above rescuing British citizens from death at the hands of the Tazbekistan regime. At the same time, of course, he was 100 per cent buffoon." While considering it inferior to the same lead performers' Peep Show, Ellen E. Jones wrote in The Independent that "Webb was a particular pleasure to watch. After so long playing a total wally, it was simply fascinating to see him as a competent, practical employee."

The Guardian's Sam Wollaston said it was "More of a drama with jokes than jokes strung together with some kind of story. The funniest bits are almost incidental" and "Ambassadors didn't blow me away, but it grew on me as it went along."

== See also ==
- Flying the Flag
