= The Mitchell and Webb Situation =

British sketch comedy television show

- The opening titles of the show
- Also known as: That Mitchell and Webb Situation
- Genre: Sketch comedy
- Created by: David Mitchell; Robert Webb
- Directed by: David Kerr
- Starring: David Mitchell; Robert Webb; Olivia Colman; Gus Brown; Susan Earl
- Theme music composer: The Holloway Brothers
- Country of origin: United Kingdom
- Original language: English
- No. of series: 1
- No. of episodes: 6

Production
- Producer: Simon Lupton
- Camera setup: Andy Hollis

Original release
- Network: Play UK
- Release: 6 October – 10 November 2001

Related
- That Mitchell and Webb Look; That Mitchell and Webb Sound

The Mitchell and Webb Situation is a British sketch comedy television show originally shown on Play UK in 2001. Written by and starring David Mitchell and Robert Webb, it lasted for one series of six episodes and was released on region 2 DVD in 2006 by Eureka Video. It was rebroadcast on BBC Two in October 2008 (as That Mitchell and Webb Situation).

== Production ==
David Kerr storyboarded each episode exhaustively, allowing the entire series to be filmed in a space of just fifteen days. Most of the filming took place at the United States International University of Bushey (formerly the Royal Masonic School for Boys).

== Reception ==
The Mitchell and Webb Situation DVD cover.

A negative review came from Empire, who called it "extremely hit and miss. Emphasis on 'extremely." DVD Times wrote: "We're faced with a duo trying to find a voice and as a result the material misses more often than it hits. For every sketch that works there's also one that doesn't, another that goes on for far too long, another that's undeveloped and another still that's simply over-egged."

In an interview with Wessex Scene, Mitchell stated that he was "more proud of the way it turned out than annoyed that it was only aired on a small channel."

== Sketches ==
Although there are no recurring named characters as seen in many other sketch shows, there are some recurring sketches. Two sketches appear in every single episode:

- Two writers who attempt to dream up scripts for things which actually already exist, for example religion, fairy tales, and the human reproductive cycle. They debate how the item in question should work, and often come to the conclusion that the way it works in real life is a ridiculous way to operate.
- As the end titles run, a scene depicting Mitchell and Webb as tramps is shown, with a different punchline for each episode.

Other sketches are only recurring within a single episode, such as:

- A farmer who talks about the various commodities he obtains from the ground, or from animals, and about his daily routine, as if he were revealing a major money-making secret to the viewer (episode 1).
- A parody of the movie Suspicion, with Webb portraying a would-be murderer frequently attempting to poison his bedridden friend (Mitchell); however, the murderer's attempts at concealing his intentions are increasingly feeble and easily uncovered by the sharp-minded friend (episode 1).
- A man in a pub asking a group of people to adjust their habits because he and his wife aren't having any fun (episode 1).
- Two bar staff who make sound effects that make other people believe an event is occurring. After they make a "Ring ring" sound, for example, a woman checks to see if her phone is ringing (episode 2).
- A man is in the pub with his friends and keeps complaining he has nobody to talk to or nothing to talk about (episode 3).
- An actor who's afraid he or a stuntman will get hurt during the filming of an action film (episode 3).
- A boy asking very personal questions to his father and uncle, apparently to incite them against each other (episode 4).
- A reality cooking show with the participant constantly making meta remarks about the filming process (episode 4).
- A man taking slightly unusual things (a trumpet, booze, an R/C car, a sex doll) to a public library, assuring the librarian that he is not planning on using them (episode 4).
- Two male colleagues (in a different profession every sketch) who end their talk with a kiss on the cheek (episode 5).
- A group of pretentious hippie backpackers who travel around England like it's an exotic country (episode 5).
- Two men in a pub who use posh talk to conceal their alcoholism (episode 5).
- A man getting a job as a copy editor for pornographic screenplays (episode 5).
- The Early 1990s House – in a parody of shows such as The 1900 House, a couple in 2001 are forced to live with only those amenities available in the early 1990s, and find coping with slow internet connections and the inability to dial 1471 a struggle (episode 6).

A sketch about a miscarriage in an abortion clinic was cut from the show as Mitchell and Webb agreed that it was inappropriate, and that their intention may have been misconstrued.
