= 10 O'Clock Live =

- Genre: Current affairs; Comedy; Satire
- Presented by: Charlie Brooker; Jimmy Carr; Lauren Laverne; David Mitchell
- Opening theme: "Bernie" by Jon Spencer Blues Explosion
- Country of origin: United Kingdom
- Original language: English
- No. of series: 3
- No. of episodes: 33

Production
- Production location: Pinewood Studios
- Running time: Series 1: 65 minutes (inc. adverts); Series 2-3: 55 minutes (inc. adverts)
- Production company: Zeppotron

Original release
- Network: Channel 4
- Release: 20 January 2011 – 12 June 2013

Related
- Channel 4's Alternative Election Night

10 O'Clock Live is a British comedy/news television programme that ran from 2011 to 2013, presented by Charlie Brooker, Jimmy Carr, Lauren Laverne and David Mitchell.

The programme was commissioned following the success of Channel 4's Alternative Election Night, fronted by the same four presenters, in May 2010. The first series appeared in 2011, with two subsequent series broadcast in 2012 and 2013. In October 2014 it was confirmed that the show would not be continuing.

The song "Bernie" by the Jon Spencer Blues Explosion was used for the show's theme.

== Interactivity ==
The show had official Facebook and Twitter pages to enable viewer interactivity whilst live on air. Polls were run via the Facebook page and comments received via both pages and read out by the presenters.

== Format ==
=== First series ===
The show was introduced by the four hosts positioned, seated or standing, around an island table. In an order that changed with each show, they would each introduce themselves by name, with the last host to speak also introducing the show ("It's 10 o'clock, we're live on Channel 4, this is 10 O'Clock Live..."). The hosts would then sit down at another table and open the show on an introductory discussion and set-up to the planned topics for the week's show. This was always followed by Jimmy Carr explaining the news of the week in the form of one-liner jokes, then by Charlie Brooker examining the way in which an event, story or media-figure has been covered in the news, focusing his satire on the way the event was covered to the public. He did the same again later on, normally on a different subject (for example, if he covered a political story earlier on, he will examine coverage of a celebrity later). David Mitchell always had three sections: a panel-discussion with guests (such as journalists, activists, and MPs) discussing an issue; an interview with a more well-known or higher-ranking political figure, which he aimed to conduct as seriously as possible, but was able to satirise what the interviewee says unlike more serious political interviewers; and a "Listen to Mitchell" section, in the style of his panel-show rants and David Mitchell's Soapbox podcast series. Carr also had two more sections to himself in the style of one-liner stand-up, but usually while satirically playing a character or figure from the news, (such as George Osborne during the week of the 2011 United Kingdom budget). Lauren Laverne tended to introduce pre-recorded sketches and material, and chair the discussions amongst the four hosts.

=== Second and third series ===
The shows from the second and third series had a slightly shorter running time than those in the first. As such, a few items were subsequently dropped: the self-introduction of each host by name (after the credits the camera cut straight to the table where the four were seated for the initial discussion, always chaired by Laverne); David Mitchell's one-to-one political interviews were removed, while his "Listen to Mitchell" segment only appeared in one episode; Charlie Brooker's sardonic takes on news stories were reduced from two to one; Lauren Laverne's pre-recorded sketches were replaced with "Lauren Laverne's Occasional Guide to...", in which she delivered a satirical "guide" to various current events, such as the 2012 Republican presidential primaries or the UK government's expenditure for the Cultural Olympiad.

== Episodes and guests ==
=== Series 1 ===
#	Guests	Original airdate
1 × 01	Richard Sharp, Kwasi Kwarteng MP, David Willetts MP, Zoe Gannon, Bjørn Lomborg	20 January 2011
1 × 02	Alastair Campbell, Tim Harford, Afua Hirsch, Professor Anthony Glees, Rizwaan Sabir	27 January 2011
1 × 03	Harry Cole, Dr. Lucie Green, Hannah Lownsbrough, Sir Christopher Bland, Caroline Lucas MP	3 February 2011
1 × 04	Simon Hughes MP, Shaun Bailey, Phillip Blond, Johann Hari	10 February 2011
1 × 05	Stephen Dubner, Tamsin Omond, Milo Yiannopoulos, Sally Bercow, Steven Norris	17 February 2011
1 × 06	Bob Crow, Yasmin Khan, Alex Singleton, Dominic Raab	24 February 2011
1 × 07	Dan Poulter, Robert Winston, Deborah Mattinson, Medhi Hasan, Shaun Bailey	3 March 2011
1 × 08	Andy Burnham MP, Shane Greer, Tansy Hoskins, Rory Stewart MP	10 March 2011
1 × 09	Nigel Farage MEP, Mark Littlewood, James Lowman, Bee Wilson	17 March 2011
1 × 10	Grant Shapps MP, Yasmin Khan, Maajid Nawaz, Carne Ross	24 March 2011
1 × 11	Ken Livingstone, Noreena Hertz, Daniel Finkelstein, Laurie Penny	31 March 2011
1 × 12	John Prescott, Johann Hari, Shane Greer of Total Politics, Jo Rice of Spear Youth charity	7 April 2011
1 × 13	Richard Sharp, James Max, Max Keiser, Tessa Jowell MP	14 April 2011
1 × 14	Owen Jones, Peter Oborne, Natalie Haynes, Clive Anderson, Charlotte Harris	21 April 2011
1 × 15	Sarah Teather MP, Jonathan Powell, Salma Yaqoob, Jesse Armstrong	28 April 2011

=== Series 2 ===
#	Guests	Original airdate
2 × 01	Alastair Campbell and Clarke Carlisle	8 February 2012
2 × 02	George Galloway and Hugo Rifkind	15 February 2012
2 × 03	Julia Hartley-Brewer, Owen Jones and Matt Cardle	22 February 2012
2 × 04	Toby Young and Mehdi Hasan	29 February 2012
2 × 05	Boy George and Milo Yiannopoulos	7 March 2012
2 × 06	David Starkey and Natalie Haynes	14 March 2012
2 × 07	George Pitcher and Evan Harris	21 March 2012
2 × 08	Amy Lamé, Dr Dawn Harper and Morgan Spurlock	28 March 2012
2 × 09	George Galloway, Emily Thornberry, Dominic Raab and Tom Brake	4 April 2012
2 × 10	Julia Hartley-Brewer, Spencer Matthews and Billy Bragg	11 April 2012

=== Series 3 ===
#	Guests	Original airdate
3 × 01	Katie Hopkins, Owen Jones, Theo Paphitis	24 April 2013
3 × 02	Angelos Epithemiou, Janet Street-Porter, Peter Stringfellow, Shiv Malik	1 May 2013
3 × 03	John Sergeant, George Galloway, Deborah Mattinson, Kayvan Novak	8 May 2013
3 × 04	Henning Wehn, Ken Livingstone, Toby Young	15 May 2013
3 × 05	Amy Lame, Milo Yiannopoulos, Ivan Massow	22 May 2013
3 × 06	Christine Hamilton, Laurie Penny, Angela Epstein	29 May 2013
3 × 07	Rich Hall, Zac Goldsmith, Diane Abbott	5 June 2013
3 × 08	Richard Bacon, David Baddiel, Rupinder Bains	12 June 2013

== Viewing figures ==
BARB as reported by The Guardian, recorded overnight viewing figures demonstrating that the show "launched with 1.373 million viewers and a 7.8% audience share, with about another 100,000 watching an hour later on Channel 4 +1", running against BBC One's popular and well established weekly political debate programme, Question Time which had ratings slightly better than the week before. Channel 4 claimed that the show nevertheless drew a higher share of the 16–34 demographic. The Guardian's reporter also remarked that Newsnight, BBC Two's flagship nightly current affairs programme, suffered its lowest audience of the past year. The BBC programmes overlap the 22:00–23:05 timeslot filled by 10 O'Clock Live.

In the second week, ratings were down to 1.084 million viewers, representing a 6% audience share.

Overnights for the show on 7 April had figures at 610,000 (3.6%) with a further 110,000 (1.2%) one hour later on the timeshifted Channel 4+1.

== Reception ==
In Metro on 11 February 2011, Christopher Hooton wrote that the show had become "a much-improved animal with several stand-out funny moments", but also claimed it had become "as overtly partisan as Fox News".

A number of commentators noted that the first series of show was consistently biased towards a left-wing stance on political issues. In The Daily Telegraph Robert Colvile strongly criticised the quality of the humour in the programme, describing it as an "insular, disjointed, murderously unfunny smug-a-thon", while in the same newspaper James Delingpole saw an overt liberal left bias in the programme.

Others have criticised the apolitical nature of the programme's comedy. Reviewing the opening episode of the second series on The Huffington Post, Richard Berry argued that the programme failed to live up to its billing as satire, commenting "More often than not, in 10 O'Clock Live politics and current affairs are referenced merely as a backdrop for toilet humour."
