= Magicians (2007 film) =

2007 British film by Andrew O'Connor

- Promotional poster
- Directed by: Andrew O'Connor
- Written by: Jesse Armstrong; Sam Bain
- Produced by: Ollie Madden
- Starring: David Mitchell; Robert Webb; Jessica Hynes
- Cinematography: James Welland
- Edited by: Lucien Clayton
- Music by: Paul Englishby
- Production companies: Universal Pictures; Intermedia Films; Breakout Films; UK Film Council; EM Media
- Distributed by: Universal Pictures
- Release date: 18 May 2007
- Running time: 90 minutes
- Country: United Kingdom
- Language: English

Magicians is a 2007 British comedy film released on 18 May 2007. It stars comic duo Robert Webb and David Mitchell as stage magicians Karl and Harry. The two magicians compete together in a magic competition, despite their personal differences. The film is directed by Andrew O'Connor and written by Jesse Armstrong and Sam Bain, who are also the writers of the Channel 4 sitcom Peep Show, which stars Mitchell and Webb. Other principal cast members include Jessica Hynes, Darren Boyd, Steve Edge, Peter Capaldi, and Andrea Riseborough.

== Plot ==
Best friends Harry Kane and Karl Allen are magicians who perform together in a successful and popular double act, with Harry's wife Carol working as their assistant. Harry and Karl's partnership collapses after a show when Harry discovers Karl and Carol having sex backstage. During their next performance, Carol is placed in a guillotine for the finale, but the blade unexpectedly falls and kills her. Whether Harry caused the accident or it was a tragic malfunction remains unclear, but the act dissolves and the two men become bitter enemies.

Four years later, Harry has abandoned show business and works unhappily in a Wilkinson hardware store, where he is fired after frightening a customer with an overly realistic knife illusion. Karl, meanwhile, is struggling to reinvent himself as The Mindmonger, a psychological illusionist, but his career is floundering. His only admirer is Dani, a tea girl at a TV studio, whose interest sparks jealousy in Karl's inept agent Otto.

Desperate for money, Harry decides to enter the Magic Shield competition in Jersey, which offers a £20,000 prize. Unable to find a skilled assistant, he reluctantly hires Linda, an old acquaintance whose only talent is an awkward dance routine. Realizing he needs a stronger act, Harry swallows his pride and asks Karl to reunite with him. Though their reputation earns them a spot in the competition, their unresolved resentment quickly resurfaces, and they split again to compete separately.

As Harry and Linda rehearse, they grow closer, though Harry's insecurity keeps him from expressing his feelings. Linda discovers the old guillotine among his props and persuades him to use it in the finale, unaware of its history. Karl, meanwhile, is thrilled when Dani travels to Jersey to support him, but panics when he realizes she believes he is a genuine psychic. With a TV producer offering him a potential show, Karl agrees to perform a medium act despite mounting guilt.

When Karl reveals the truth about Carol's death to Linda, Harry mistakenly believes she has fled home and impulsively flies to London—despite his fear of flying—only to learn she simply changed hotel rooms. He rushes back to Jersey in time for the competition, but the revelation strains their relationship. On the night of the finale, Linda falsely claims she slept with another magician to provoke Harry into admitting his feelings, but he remains emotionally closed off. Karl, preparing to sleep with Dani, confesses he is not psychic, and she leaves him feeling betrayed.

Backstage, Karl accuses Harry of murdering Carol. Harry angrily denies it, insisting Karl prefers the accusation to facing his own guilt over the affair. During Karl's performance, his planted audience stooge injures himself, and Karl abandons the act, confessing publicly that he cannot speak to the dead. Dani forgives him for his honesty.

Harry begins his guillotine act as “The Black Widower,” but Linda panics and runs offstage. With the act collapsing, Karl unexpectedly volunteers to take her place. Locked in the guillotine, he admits Carol repeatedly pressured him into affairs and that he was unable to perform when Harry caught them. Harry “decapitates” Karl in a flawless illusion, and Karl emerges unharmed. Harry wins the competition, publicly forgives Karl, and finally admits his love for Linda. Reconciled, Harry and Karl launch a reunion tour with Linda and Dani as their assistants.

== Cast ==
- David Mitchell as Harry
- Robert Webb as Karl
- Jessica Hynes as Linda
- Andrea Riseborough as Dani
- Darren Boyd as Otto Johnson
- Peter Capaldi as Mike Francis
- Steve Edge as Tony White
- Sarah Hadland as Carol
- Miranda Hart in a cameo appearance as a bank loan officer
- Angel Coulby as an office receptionist
- Katy Wix as a waitress

The magic consultant for the film was Scott Penrose who also appears as Magibot. Some of the UK's leading real life magicians Aladin, Ali Bongo and Patrick Page make cameo appearances in the film.

== Production ==
The duo had not expected to star in a film at this point of their careers, with Mitchell stating that "it probably came much earlier than we thought we would do a film. It landed very fortuitously on our doormat." At first, Mitchell and Webb were not considered for the roles of Harry and Karl, but O'Connor changed his mind when "it became clear they could do these parts really well. And we thought, well, wouldn't it be great to do our first movie with people we know, because we really admire and enjoy working with them". Unlike most other Mitchell and Webb projects, Olivia Colman does not have a main part in the film. O'Connor explained that "Olivia was part of the development and did some read-throughs with us. I guess our feeling was that because of the relationship between [Mitchell and Webb] and Olivia in Peep Show, to have taken that same relationship, it would have been a really weird thing for the audience. I must say I think she'd have been great in the part, she was great in the read-throughs, I just thought we couldn't have done that." Mitchell admitted, the day before the film's release, that he "really got into" his role as Harry.

Mitchell and Webb were taught basic magical skills for the film, with them each receiving "welcome pack of DVDs telling the history of magic". Andrew O'Connor was a member of The Magic Circle but was thrown out for revealing secrets, so he and Scott Penrose taught Mitchell and Webb magical skills. Whilst filming in Nottingham, unit signs being used in the film were repeatedly being stolen by teenagers as they had the word "magic" on them. Multiple signs had to be ordered, at £3 each. The magic shield competition takes place in Jersey, but the filming for these was done in Skegness.

== Reception ==
=== Box office ===
The film opened on 251 screens on 18 May 2007, grossing £366,188 in its first weekend — a sum described as "healthy" but "low-key" by Variety. Overall it charted fairly poorly at the box office, generating £154,822 in its second week, placing it sixth at the British box office, before dropping to 20th with £25,404 the following week, and to 32nd with £3,766 the next, before dropping out of the chart. Its total gross was £885,174.

=== Critical response ===
The film received mixed reviews. Empire reviewer Olly Richards gave Magicians three stars, concluding that "The bumbling charms of the stars just about pull this through, but there'll be few calls for an encore come the final curtain." Derek Malcolm said that Mitchell and Webb "don't exactly cover themselves with glory in their first feature film. But they just about reach par." Going to describe the film as a "bit of a mess", although it "raises a few laughs". Alison Rowat called Magicians "an hour of OK telly trying to pass as a film", and gave it two stars. This assessment was shared by Leslie Felperin of Variety, who saw it as an "attenuated TV episode", with only "mildly amusing results", that was not as funny as Peep Show. Stuart McGurk gave a negative review, citing that "for a much-anticipated film, this is a huge let-down", and that it lacks "the eclectic off-key cruelty and spot-on zingers of the much-revered Peep Show", although he did say that the film "still has the odd good line", but concluded by saying that anyone "expecting anything else will be sorely disappointed". The Guardian's Phelim O'Neill gave Magicians two stars, calling it "Peep Show the sequel", and stated that "O'Connor's direction has absolutely zero visual flair, making the performers' transition from television to film rather pointless." The Times' Dominic Maxwell decided that "Magicians doesn't have the brio (or great gags), let alone the marketability, of a Bridget Jones." Caroline Westbrook gave the film three stars, and gave it an even review, stating that "There's a lot to like about Magicians, especially if you're a fan of Mitchell and Webb", although it "ultimately feels as though it's lacking something". She concluded that "It's a perfectly agreeable way to while away an hour and a half — but don't expect to remember much about it in the morning." Digital Spy gave the film a positive review, and three stars concluding that "A must for magic and Peep Show fans alike, with some original and brilliant comedy moments."

On the review aggregator website Rotten Tomatoes, 33% of 9 critics' reviews are positive, with an average rating of 4.6/10.
