= Comedy Nation =

British sketch comedy TV programme

- Genre: Sketch comedy
- Country of origin: United Kingdom
- Original language: English
- No. of series: 2

Production
- Running time: 30 minutes

Original release
- Network: BBC Two
- Release: 10 January 1998 – 1999

Comedy Nation was a British sketch comedy television programme that premiered at midnight 9 January 1998 on BBC Two. The first series consisted of 13 episodes, each containing 30 sketches. Each episode of the first series cost £29,000 to produce.
