= That Mitchell and Webb Sound =

BBC Radio 4 comedy sketch show

- The cover of That Mitchell and Webb Sound Series 2, with Webb on the left and Mitchell on the right.
- Genre: Comedy sketch show
- Running time: 30 minutes
- Country of origin: United Kingdom
- Language: English
- Home station: BBC Radio 4
- Starring: David Mitchell; Robert Webb; Olivia Colman; James Bachman; Sarah Hadland (series 4)
- Written by: The cast Jesse Armstrong; Sam Bain; Mark Evans; David Quantick; Jonathan Dryden Taylor; John Finnemore; Toby Davies; Simon Kane; Eddie Robson; Jim Smith
- Original release: 28 August 2003 – 17 December 2013
- No. of series: 5
- No. of episodes: 29
- Opening theme: Stranger on the Shore

That Mitchell and Webb Sound is a comedy sketch show which was first broadcast on BBC Radio 4 on 28 August 2003. A second series was broadcast in 2005 with a third starting on 24 May 2007. The radio programme, which itself followed the 2001 Play UK television sketch series The Mitchell and Webb Situation, was adapted for television in That Mitchell and Webb Look in 2006. That Mitchell and Webb Sound returned to BBC Radio 4 for a fourth series in 2009, with the first episode broadcast on 25 August 2009. A fifth series was announced in September 2013, and began transmission on 26 November 2013.

The series stars David Mitchell and Robert Webb, who also wrote some of the material. The cast includes frequent Mitchell and Webb collaborators James Bachman and Olivia Colman. Sarah Hadland joined the cast for the fourth series.

Many sketches were contributed by other cast members or writers, including Jesse Armstrong and Sam Bain (the writers of Peep Show, in which Mitchell and Webb star), Mark Evans, David Quantick, Jonathan Dryden Taylor, Toby Davies, Simon Kane and John Finnemore. It was produced by Gareth Edwards.

== Recurring sketches ==
The series has no fixed format but there are a number of recurring scenarios and sketch formats. Most of the recurring characters appear in the first two series.

- Ted and Peter — a parody of television snooker commentary. Ted and Peter (Mitchell and Webb respectively) are a pair of jaded ex-players, whose voiceover trails off from describing the game, revealing more than they should about their personal lives and the murky behind-the-scenes, hard-drinking, hard-fighting, dog-eat-dog world of the sport and its commentators. Although the stories generally featured fictional snooker players, they were nonetheless allegories of 'characters' of the sport such as Alex Higgins.
- Friends Of... — Mitchell and Webb prepare a party guest list, and realise that one of the guests will bring along a famous literary, film, TV or historical figure (though the duo are unaware of the guest's fame in the context of the sketches). An extra twist is that positive figures are usually described as party wreckers and infamous figures are celebrated. The arrival of James Bond is dreaded ("So I say, 'Do you want a glass of wine, James, or there's beer in the fridge?' Prat asks for a martini!") while Hitler is welcomed ("Oh, I do love it when he goes off on one"). Other guests have included Darth Vader, June Sarpong, Dr. Jekyll and Mr. Hyde, and the Mystery Inc. gang of Scooby-Doo.
- Imagine That — A parody of intelligent panel shows. A set of intellectuals — journalist and broadcaster Mark Kendall (Webb), author June Faulkner (Colman) and Head of Physics at UCL Professor David Trussell (Mitchell) — are asked by the host (Bachman) to conceive of various bizarre ideas, such as "the biggest jacket potato they can think of." One episode was mistakenly called "Imagine Hat", due to "a printing error in the Radio Times," which the host decides to take as a challenge. The panellists therefore had to imagine a hat. Prof. Trussell is slightly deranged, and frequently clashes with the host. This is the only recurring sketch to appear in the first three series.
- Big Talk — Host Raymond Terrific (Webb) shouts at his panel of "boffins", demanding they solve the world's problems.
- Adrian Locket — Adrian (Mitchell) is a weary late-night local radio DJ who harbours no illusions about his audience. His life is about as lonely and dark as the hours he works.
- The Lazy Film Writers — A parody of various film genres. The writers (Mitchell and Webb) are reluctant to carry out research for their next film, and consequently make films with generic storylines, oversimplified dialogue and glaring inaccuracies. Members of the crew on a spaceship are at one point warned that "breathing space is incredibly bad for you".
- The Surprising Adventures of Sir Digby Caesar-Salad — Characters in Series 1 and 3. Sir Digby (Webb) and his sidekick Ginger (Mitchell) believe that they are detectives in the style of Dick Barton when in fact they are drunken tramps. They are so poor that they have to hum their own theme tune (Devil's Galop), which is usually sung as the intrepid duo are escaping from a crime scene, and regularly fight each other for loose change. They believe that plots are constantly being hatched against them by their "nemesis" described as "some bastard who is presumably responsible". Henchmen of their nemesis turn up in the shape of the police or whoever stumbles in front of them. When the series transferred to television, Sir Digby was renamed Sir Digby Chicken Caesar, and he kept this name for the third radio series. In series three, Sir Digby thought his nemesis had contaminated a water supply, which led him to investigate a brewery.
- Jason, the New Presenter — A recurring character in Series 1, played by Webb. Jason originally appeared in a fly-on-the-wall documentary where he almost killed himself, and subsequently became the star of the show. As a result, he now presents a wide range of make-over shows. Jason tends to be rather insensitive, and concerned only with himself and his fame. As such, he tends to insult his guests. Appears as a one-off in That Mitchell And Webb Look, presenting "The Hole In The Ring", a parody of The Weakest Link. Jason then returned in Mitchell And Webb Are Not Helping to host "Hot Seat's Little Stool: Put Your Feet Up", a spoof of gameshow companion shows like The Apprentice: You're Fired!, making him the only character from any of their previous sketch shows to appear in the new one.
- Little Date — A series of sketches in Series 3. Webb plays a man who has a different job in every sketch, who encounters a woman (Colman) whom he verbally attacks, mocks and ridicules until she cries. When the woman is crying, Webb then asks her out on a "little date", to which the woman always agrees, in the hope of feeling better. Returns as a one-off in TV series 2, for a sketch set in a library.
- Stargate — A series of sketches in Series 4. Mitchell plays the manager of Brown's Orthopaedic Supplies, an office that just happens to have a Stargate among its office equipment which the staff keep abusing, using it, amongst others, as a waste bin, toilet, smoking area and stationery supplies cupboard.
- The Old Lady Job Justification Hearings — A series of sketches in Series 4. Set about thirty years into the future in the aftermath of the fall of Joanna Lumley's benign dictatorship, these are recordings of meetings between people who have different jobs (namely cosmetic surgeon, wedding planner, investments manager and public relations officer) trying to justify what they do is a "proper" job (like a doctor, fireman or someone who runs a little shop) to a group of old women. In the final episode of the series, Mitchell and Webb themselves were the subjects of the hearings.
- Christopher Hitchens Hour — A series of sketches in Series 4 which satirise Christopher Hitchens by giving him his own television show on the children's TV network Cbeebies. The show in question would involve Hitchens (Webb) summarising various complex geopolitical issues as if they were children's fairy tales, and would usually end with the 101st Airborne Division launching a bombing raid on Hitchens's political opponents.
- Pinocchio — A modern version of the fairy tale of the same name, in which the titular character (Webb) routinely embarrasses his 'father' (Mitchell) in social situations.

== Reception ==
The Telegraph called it "simply brilliant". It also received positive reviews from The Guardian and Radio Times.
