= Mark Evans (comedian) =

Welsh comedy writer, director and actor

- Born: November 3, 1973 (age 52); Wrexham, Wales
- Occupations: Writer, director, actor

Mark Evans is a Welsh comedy writer, director and actor.

== Early life ==
Evans was raised in Wrexham and read Classics at Cambridge University. He joined the Footlights, where he became president, and met writing partner James Bachman and also Robert Webb. After an unsuccessful stint as a stand-up comedian, he decided to switch to screenwriting.

== Career ==
=== Television ===
Evans' big break came when he was asked to write for Jack Docherty's eponymous show The Jack Docherty Show. His most notable work was for Mitchell and Webb's radio show That Mitchell and Webb Sound and its award-winning television adaptation That Mitchell and Webb Look. Some of his other credits include Ant & Dec's Saturday Night Takeaway (2002–2003), Popetown (2005) and The Late Edition (2006). He has also appeared in That Mitchell and Webb Look as various minor characters, Saxondale, the CBBC programme Sorry, I've Got No Head and various commercials.

=== Radio ===
He wrote the popular BBC Radio 4 comedy series Bleak Expectations, which ran from 2007 to 2012. It was adapted into a four episode TV series in late 2011, The Bleak Old Shop of Stuff.

On 6 May 2008, he and long-time writing partner James Bachman recorded the pilot of their BBC Radio 4 comedy Zoom, starring David Soul, Carla Mendonca, and Jon Glover, with a special guest appearance by Nicholas Parsons as himself.

=== Books ===
In November 2012, Constable & Robinson published Evans' novel based on Bleak Expectations.

=== Stage ===
In May 2022, Evans wrote a stage adaptation of Bleak Expectations which opened at the Watermill Theatre, Newbury, Berkshire. In May 2023, the play opened in London's West End at the Criterion Theatre with different celebrity guest stars each week.
