= Helen Keen =

English alternative comedian and writer

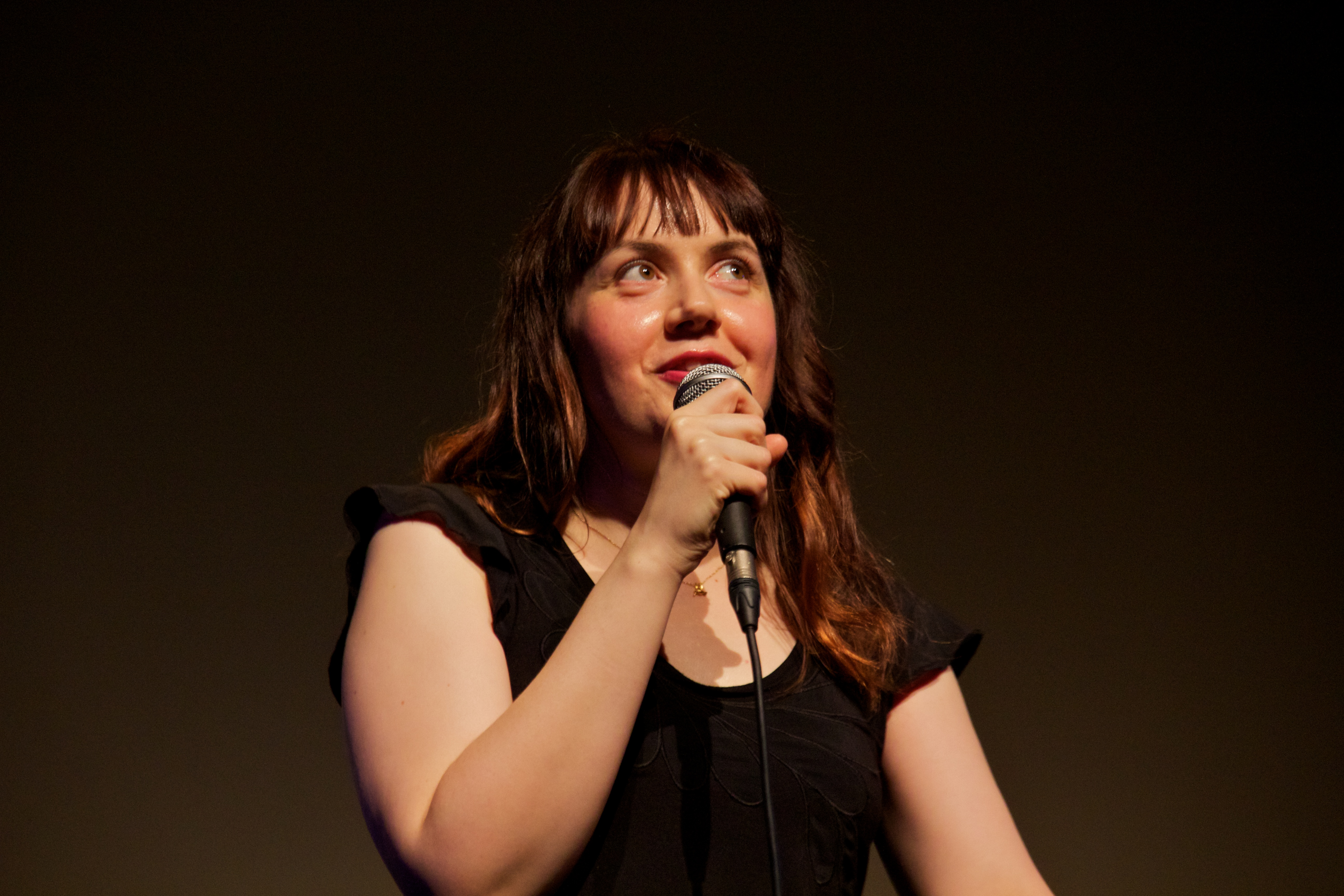
- Helen Keen at Bright Club in 2011
- Born: Yorkshire, England
- Notable work: It Is Rocket Science

Comedy career
- Medium: Stand-up, radio
- Website: www.helenkeen.com

Helen Keen is an English alternative comedian and writer born in Yorkshire, now living in London. She suffered with SM (Selective Mutism) as a child but overcame this before becoming a comedian.

== Career ==
Keen was raised in Hull, East Riding of Yorkshire. In 2005, along with writing partner Miriam Underhill, she won the first Channel 4 New Comedy Writing Initiative award. Judges included station executives, as well as Annie Griffin, Victoria Pile and Arthur Mathews. She also reached the 2005 UK Funny Women final. In 2006, she was a finalist for the hotly contested Hackney Empire New Act of the Year title. In 2007, she performed in the second annual tribute to Malcolm Hardee. Her broadcast writing has included regular credits on BBC Radio 1's late-night experimental comedy show The Milk Run and BBC Radio 4's long-running The Now Show as well as the Dog Almighty edition of Channel 4's Comedy Lab series and the 2007 series of Channel 4's The Friday Night Project.

== Live shows ==
Keen's subject matter tends towards the unusual and esoteric. Her solo shows are also unusual in that they have all toured both arts festivals (including music festivals) and science festivals.

At the Buxton Festival Fringe in July 2008, her first full-length solo show It Is Rocket Science! (a stand-up comedy lecture about the history of the space rocket) was nominated as Best Show and she won the Best Individual Performer award. She then performed the show throughout the Edinburgh Fringe in August 2008. The show then toured science festivals across the UK and Ireland. For many festivals this was the first time that they had booked a comedy performer.

Her second full-length show Helen Keen: The Primitive Methodist Guide to Arctic Survival (the true story of an ancestor trapped overwinter on an arctic whaling ship) ran throughout the Edinburgh Fringe in August 2009 before embarking upon a similar tour of science festivals. Also in this show and in interviews Keen, a postman's daughter, discussed her working-class family background and her early experience of selective mutism.

In 2011 Keen was a guest on several performances of The Infinite Monkey Cage "Uncaged Monkeys" live tour alongside Brian Cox, Simon Singh, Robin Ince and Ben Goldacre.

Keen also curates and comperes Spacetacular!, a space-themed comedy quiz night along with Londonist editor Matt Brown. In 2012 Spactacular! received a UK Space Agency Space For All award.

Keen hosted the first Comedy Night at the CERN lab in August 2013, the show proved to be CERN's most successful webcast since the discovery of the Higgs boson there, and was followed from 105 countries by nearly 10,000 browsers.

In 2013 Keen was a guest on The Infinite Monkey Cage.

== Radio ==
In December 2010 Keen recorded her first BBC Radio 4 series, It Is Rocket Science. She created, wrote and performed in the 4-part series based on her 2008 Edinburgh show It Is Rocket Science! Alongside Keen, the show starred Susy Kane and Peter Serafinowicz and was produced by Gareth Edwards. The first episode was broadcast on 9 March 2011. A second series was broadcast in 2012 and a third series aired on BBC Radio 4 in May 2014.

Big Problems with Helen Keen, which applied the same format to a broader range of scientific issues, was broadcast on Radio 4 in 2015.

== Awards ==
Keen won the Channel 4 New Comedy Writing Award 2005.

She won the Buxton Festival Fringe Best Comedy Performance 2008.

From 2010 to 2012 she was Comedian in Residence at the Newcastle Centre for Life science village, the first time the position had been awarded.

In 2013 her BBC Radio 4 series It Is Rocket Science won the WISE Media Award. This was presented by Princess Anne in a ceremony at the Science Museum, London. The show was also nominated for the 2014 Writers' Guild of Great Britain Award for Best Radio Comedy. It was shortlisted for the 2015 Association of British Science Writers Royal Society Radio Prize.

In 2015 Keen was made a Wired UK Innovation Fellow.
