= Bleak Expectations (play) =

2022 stage show

- Written by: Mark Evans
- Original language: English
- Genre: Comedy

Premiere
- Date premiered: 27 May 2022
- Place premiered: Watermill Theatre, Newbury, Berkshire

Bleak Expectations is a comedy play by Mark Evans based on his BBC Radio 4 series of the same name.

== Production history ==
The play made its world premiere at the Watermill Theatre in Newbury, Berkshire directed by Caroline Lesley, running from 27 May until 2 July 2022.

Due to the success of the Watermill production, the play transferred to London's West End at the Criterion Theatre from 3 May 2023. A different guest star appears each week as the narrator, including Tom Allen, Adjoa Andoh, Alexander Armstrong, Julian Clary, Jack Dee, Stephen Fry, Lee Mack, Stephen Mangan, Dermot O'Leary, Sue Perkins, Sally Philips and Nina Wadia. The production was due to run until 3 September, however was announced it would be closing early on 13 August 2023 (cancelling Ben Miller and Nish Kumar's runs as the narrator). Hugh Dennis was also announced to replace Jo Brand's run as the narrator.

== Cast and characters ==
Main character	Original Watermill cast (2022)	Original West End cast (2023)
Agnes Bin / Flora Dies-Early	Alicia McKenzie	Ashh Blackwood
Gently Benevolent	Simon Kane	John Hopkins
The Hardthrashers	Dan Tetsell	Marc Pickering
Harry Biscuit / Mr Parsimonious	JJ Henry	
Pip Bin	Dom Hodson	
Pippa Bin	Rosie Basista	Serena Manteghi
Poppy Bin / Ripely Fecund	Caitlin Scott	Rachel Summers
Thomas Bin / Bakewell Havertwitch / Broadly Fecund	Colm Gleeson	Shane David-Joseph
Sir Philip Bin	Nicholas Murchie	Various guest stars*
Understudies	—N/a	Abigail Matthews; Conor Dumbrell; Emily Waters; Eric Mallett

- Guest stars: Adjoa Andoh, Alexander Armstrong, Craig Ferguson, Dermot O'Leary, Jack Dee, Julian Clary, Lee Mack, Nina Wadia, Robert Lindsay, Sally Phillips, Stephen Fry, Stephen Mangan, Sue Perkins, Tom Allen, Hugh Dennis.
