= Laura Jackson (presenter) =

English television presenter (born 1986)

- Born: Laura Emma Jackson; 30 April 1986 (age 40); Huddersfield, West Yorkshire, England
- Occupations: Television presenter, food columnist
- Spouse: Jonathan Gorrigan (m. 2017)
- Children: 3

Laura Emma Jackson (born 30 April 1986) is a television presenter. She presents Seasons on CNN International and presented the quiz shows Ready or Not on BBC One and Take Me Out: The Gossip on ITV2.

== Biography ==
Jackson was born in Huddersfield, West Yorkshire, and raised in Kirkburton. She has four siblings. She was educated at Shelley College.

She began her career presenting the T4 music show Freshly Squeezed alongside Nick Grimshaw, and went on to present on Take Me Out: The Gossip on ITV2, This Morning on ITV, The Clothes Show on BBC One and Big Brother's Little Brother on Channel 4. In 2018, she hosted Ready or Not on BBC One.

She ran an East London supper club, Jackson&Levine, with Alice Levine. In 2014, Jackson and Levine wrote a food column for Company magazine, and have published a cookbook. They also have a homeware line with Habitat.

Jackson married photographer Jonathan Gorrigan in 2017. They had a child in 2019.

In 2025, CNN announced that Jackson would host the second instalment of the human interest/lifestyle series Seasons.

== Bibliography ==
- Jackson, Laura; Levine, Alice (2017). Round to Ours: Setting the Mood and Cooking the Food. Quadrille Publishing. p. 272. ISBN 978-1-84949-959-0.
