= Bleak Expectations =

BBC Radio 4 comedy series

- Genre: Sitcom
- Running time: 29 minutes
- Country of origin: United Kingdom
- Language: English
- Home station: BBC Radio 4
- Syndicates: BBC Radio 4 Extra
- TV adaptations: The Bleak Old Shop of Stuff
- Starring: Tom Allen; James Bachman; Mark Evans; Sarah Hadland; Anthony Head; Richard Johnson; Susy Kane; Geoffrey Whitehead; Celia Imrie
- Written by: Mark Evans
- Produced by: Gareth Edwards
- Recording studio: BBC Radio Theatre
- Original release: 15 August 2007 – 25 December 2012
- No. of series: 5
- No. of episodes: 30
- Opening theme: Mazurka from Three Characteristic Pieces by Edward Elgar
- Ending theme: Mazurka from Three Characteristic Pieces by Edward Elgar
- Website: www.bbc.co.uk/programmes/b00cwgs6

Bleak Expectations is a BBC Radio 4 comedy series that premiered in August 2007. It is a parody of the works of Charles Dickens such as Bleak House and Great Expectations, from which it derives its name, including adventure, science fiction, and costume dramas set in the same period. Bleak Expectations parodies several of their plot devices whilst simultaneously tending toward surreal humour along the lines of The Goon Show. The series also demonstrated a fondness for allusions to parodies of the films of Alec Guinness, particularly the black comedy Kind Hearts and Coronets.

Bleak Expectations is written by Mark Evans who plays minor characters in most episodes, and is produced by Gareth Edwards. Its opening and closing theme are the main theme of the Mazurka from Three Characteristic Pieces by Edward Elgar.

The plot revolves around Philip "Pip" Bin, the fictitious inventor of the bin, and his various fantastic adventures as he attempts to thwart the machinations of his evil ex-guardian, Mr. Gently Benevolent. Pip narrates it as an old man to the journalist (and his eventual son-in-law) Sourquill, who brings various useless inventions to assist in recording the events.

== Production and broadcast history ==
The pilot episode was recorded in March 2006. The first series was broadcast at 11.30 am on Wednesdays from 15 August 2007, with the first series repeated on Radio 4 from 9 January 2008 and subsequently on BBC 7. A second series was commissioned in late 2007, and was recorded on 18, 23, and 26 May 2008 at the BBC Radio Theatre. The British Comedy Guide website gave it its British Comedy Guide Editors' Award for 2008. A third series was recorded at the Radio Theatre, Broadcasting House, on 7, 14 and 28 June 2009, the first episode of which was broadcast on Radio 4 on 29 October 2009. The third series won a Bronze Radio Academy Award in the Comedy category in 2010. The fourth six-part series premiered on 11 November 2010.

Mark Evans tweeted on 20 Dec 2011 that a fifth series of the show would be made in 2012 for broadcast on Radio 4. The first of the six episodes of this fifth series, titled "A Pleasant Yet Dull Life Re-Evilled", was broadcast on BBC Radio 4 at 6.30 pm on 20 November 2012.

The Bleak Old Shop of Stuff, a televisual spiritual successor to Bleak Expectations, written and produced by the same crew, was first broadcast on BBC Two on 19 December 2011.

Bleak Expectations, a novelization of the first series, written by Mark Evans was published in November 2012 by Constable & Robinson. A theatrical adaptation of the show ran at the Watermill Theatre in summer 2022, and transferred to the West End at the Criterion Theatre from 3 May to 13 August 2023.

== Cast ==
- Richard Johnson –
  - Sir Philip Put-that-in-the Bin – The richest man in England, the inventor of the rubbish bin, England's most celebrated author, and our narrator. He spends the series describing his youthful adventures to his daughter Lily, whom he adores, and the journalist (later his son-in-law) Jeremy Sourquill, whom he despises. An irascible, temperamental old man, he spends much time protesting the newfangled ideals of the late Victorian era, such as women's voting and women's thinking, as well as the various devices brought along by Sourquill.
- Tom Allen –
  - Pip Bin – Sir Philip as a young man, and our hero. Naïve, idealistic, and true, Pip's dramatic rising and falling in fortune, safety, and security (mostly at the hand of the evil Mr Benevolent) are the subject of Sir Philip's story.
- Anthony Head –
  - Mr Gently Benevolent – Pip's former guardian and his personal nemesis. The evilest man in the world, his massively complicated evil plans are designed both to conquer the world and to personally make Pip as miserable as possible. His plots often include very transparent disguises that Pip somehow never manages to see through. His evilness is the product of a combination of a family curse (he is descended from the accountant to Judas Iscariot) and a traumatic childhood at the hands of a mother secretly plotting to make him evil and a series of sadistic stepfathers. His full name is Gently Lovely Kissy Nice-Nice Benevolent. Though Benevolent has been killed and resurrected multiple times, and even briefly de-eviled by marriage to his childhood sweetheart, he has always returned to ruin Pip's life, in an obsession that occasionally verges on a love affair.
  - Jeremy Sourquill, a bumbling journalist transcribing Sir Philip's story for serial publication. He meets, falls in love with, and marries Lily, Sir Philip's daughter, over the course of the first series, becoming Sir Philip's son-in-law. This does not endear him to Sir Philip, who already despises him for his constant lateness (with a different ridiculous reason in each episode) and for his reliance on a series of ludicrously complex steampunk devices designed to help him write his articles (such as a steam-powered typewriter, a horse-drawn pencil, a carrier cheetah and an iWax phonographic recorder). During the third series, the devices he brings with him are intended to assist in baby care rather than writing. It is not until the final episode of the series, where he stands up to Sir Philip, that he earns his father-in-law's respect. He is revealed, at the end of the first series, to be Mr. Benevolent's grandson. After Lily proposes to him, he renounces a plan to kill Sir Philip to avenge his grandfather and this connection is never mentioned again.
- James Bachman –
  - Harry Biscuit – Pip's best friend and, later, brother-in-law. Harry is impressively loyal, impulsively brave, and irrepressibly cheerful, but also incurably dim. The son of the man who invented the biscuit, Harry is anxious to prove himself as an inventor in his own right. His attempts to aid Pip usually occur in the form of pointlessly complicated devices, most of which are inspired by his obsession with cake, swans, or both. Harry is a parody of the loyal, happy-go-lucky Herbert Pocket in Great Expectations.
  - Servewell, Sir Philip's loyal servant.
- Susy Kane –
  - Pippa Swing-top Wheelie Bin (Later Biscuit), Pip's sister and eventually Harry's wife. An intelligent and passionate woman constrained by a time period that considers her ambitions silly at best and illegal at worst, Pippa channels her energies into era-appropriate pursuits such as charities, social causes, and bearing as many children as possible. Her marriage with Harry has had many dramatic ups and downs, including the loss and regaining of their twenty-three children, Harry's temporary death, and Pippa's season-long dalliance with evil (and Mr. Benevolent).
- Sarah Hadland –
  - Lady Lily Bin (Later Sourquill), Sir Philip's beloved daughter listens intently as her father narrates her life story. Sweet and intelligent, Lily shows an interest in women's rights issues (such as voting and trouser-wearing) that irritates her father. She falls in love with and marries Jeremy Sourquill, and she gives birth to their first child in the second series finale.
  - Ripely Deliciously Temptingly Fecund (Later Bin), Pip's third(ish) wife (series 2–5); The daughter of a reverend, Ripely was raised to believe she was horrifically ugly since being disfigured in a buffet accident when she was three years old. However, her disfigurement was actually bits of buffet food stuck to her face, and once removed she was revealed to be quite beautiful. She was the eldest of seventeen daughters, her younger sisters being hexadecimuplets (whose births resulted in the death of their mother). Her marriage with Pip is marked by her insatiable libido and poorly hidden obsession with shirtless cavalry officers. As she ages, she develops into something of a snob and becomes the most overtly sarcastic of the cast's heroes.
  - Miss Christmasham, Sweetly's eccentric, shut-in guardian, a parody of Miss Havisham who sits in her home after being stood up by relatives she had invited for a Christmas Day dinner. She dies in a prolonged series of household accidents that result in Benevolent missing Sweetly Delightful's wedding and becoming evil. (series 3 only)
  - Juanita Hotchilli (Uncredited, Series 4 only) An incredibly attractive Mexican woman, one of ninety-three women Harry marries in an overcomplicated plan to avoid being abandoned after Pippa leaves him for Mr. Benevolent. The other ninety-two wives are all elderly women named Doris, and they all, including Juanita, leave Harry for Mr. Benevolent seconds after he boasts that Benevolent cannot possibly steal all of his wives. Eventually, she and the other wives have their brains placed in the bodies of dinosaurs as part of Mr. Benevolent's evil plans, a transformation that does not at all diminish Juanita's attractiveness. She became Mr Benevolent's evil consort after he left Pippa. She is never mentioned again after the last episode of series four.
  - Hadland also plays, uncredited, a number of small and supporting roles throughout the series, including perpetually dying chimney sweep Jo Sentimental-Overload, river Thames scavenger Mrs. Scrunge, and various small children and animals.
- Geoffrey Whitehead –
  - The Hardthrashers/Sternbeaters/Whackwallops/Grimpunches/Clampvultures – The entire dynasty of various evil families with equally unpleasant names, who serve as accomplices to the evil Mr. Benevolent. His characters get bumped off in various gruesome ways during the series, usually one per episode, although occasionally one will run into the next episode, giving Geoffrey Whitehead an unequalled tally of comedy deaths as different characters. This is inspired by the film Kind Hearts and Coronets, in which Alec Guinness played multiple members of the same family, all of whom were killed off in different ways over the course of the film.
    - In the first series, he is the Hardthrasher siblings; Jeremiah (headmaster – crushed by an anvil), Obadiah (doctor – crushed by a guillotine), Ezekiel (beadle – crushed by a wall inscribed with Bible passages), Hasdrubal (admiral – set on fire, then drowned), Chastity (governess – poisoned) and Buford T (judge – struck on the head by one of Harry's kidneys travelling at high velocity).
    - In the second series, he plays the six Sternbeater brothers, cousins of the Hardthrashers; Francis Norman 'Frank N.' (mad scientist – thrown off a roof then impaled), Emmett (railway magnate – crushed by a falling train), Jedrington (Speaker of the House of Commons – set on fire then exploded), Avarice (money-lender – stabbed), Pushington (opium dealer – given an overdose then shot) and George S (general – disintegrated by Martians). General George S. Sternbeater was the black sheep of the family, and therefore the only good one.
    - In series 3 the family name is Whackwallop: Inspector Whackwallop (from Scotland Yard – exsanguinated by Mr Benevolent), Caduceus (Psychiatrist – pelted with soup tins by Harry), Grinder (Factory Manager – pulled apart by factory workers), Barker (Freak Show proprietor – killed by his freaks), and Righteous (Bishop – impaled by a church spire but made undead). Their father was also Mr Benevolent's stepfather and the first person he killed after becoming evil. In the final episode of Series 3, a Mr Harshsmacker appears briefly at the end, and claims that he and his five brothers were cousins of Bishop Whackwallop; the Harshsmackers do not appear in subsequent episodes.
    - In series 4, the family name is Grimpunch, who, for the first time, don't imply that they're in any way related to the other families, and some of whom aid Pip in attempting to defeat Mr Benevolent; Atilla (Accomplice – grenade pant wedgie), Genghis (Accomplice – stabbed by Mr. Benevolent with a nine-foot-long blackcurrant knife), Virgil (Underworld Guide – punished by demons), Randolph (Publicist – trampled to death by Harry's wives), Beehab (Sea Captain – died fighting his nemesis Moby Delicious, a sea bass), Pascal (Cheese Mine Foreman – killed by enslaved cheese miners), and Rasputin Grimpunchovski (Russian General – did not explicitly die but led a Russian invasion of Prussia).
    - In series 5, Whitehead portrays various invariably doomed members of the Clampvulture family; Lord Dukey (Aristocrat – shot with his own elephant gun by Ripely), Everest (Chief Surveyor of India – decapitated by a cricket ball), Ranulph Twizzleton Silly-Middle-Name (Polar Explorer – self-cannibalism), Delbert (Hotelier – crushed by a piano), Venkman (Demonbuster – succumbed to evil exorcised from Harry) and Gladraeli (Prime Minister – thrown into Mr. Benevolent's Universe-Destroying Device by Pip).
- Mark Evans –
  - Various Minor Roles – Evans is credited in the cast list of every episode, usually as "Sundry [followed by a type of character]". Average credit is "Sundry Members of the Clergy and the Working Classes". On one occasion when he had no lines, he was credited as "Sundry Trappist Monks." Some of his more prominent roles include:
    - Mr. Wyckham-Post-Forburton – Thomas's lawyer, whose full name took twenty minutes to say, his greatest asset as he charged by the hour. When representing Pip in a fraudulent intellectual theft case, he was hanged personally by the presiding judge after he became irritated with his long name.
    - Dr. Cure-Some-By-Chance
    - Queen Victoria
    - A giant red dragon named Clive
    - Charles Dickens – When Mr. Benevolent (disguised as Dickens) challenges Pip to a novel-writing contest, Dickens is kidnapped by Benevolent to write his submission, The Mystery of Edwin Drood.
    - The Ghost of Christmas Past, Present, and Future, a position resulting from rationalization.
- Laurence Howarth –
  - Mr. Skinflint Parsimonious, ironically an extremely generous and giving soul, Pip's father's dearest friend and business advisor. His time in a workhouse left him providing contrarian business advice. Installed as the Headmaster of St Lovely's school, he dies in the second series when he falls off the roof whilst fighting Mr. Benevolent, and is subsequently crushed by the school's memorial cross, inscribed with "That none shall die anymore". He died as he lived: ironically. He returns throughout the second series as a ghost to aid Pip from beyond the grave.
- David Mitchell (Second and Fourth series only) –
  - The Reverend Godly Fecund, Ripely's father and a priest. He provides Pip with aid, especially in series 4, in which he sacrifices himself by being fired out of a holy water cannon into an army of demons. He had maintained the charade of Ripely's disfigurement (supposedly at God's insistence) so that she would never marry and thus care for him in old age.
- Celia Imrie (First Series only) –
  - Agnes Bin, Pip's mother, goes mad after her husband is apparently killed – when he returns at the end of the first series she reveals that her madness was feigned
  - Aunt Lily, Pip's aunt, and Agnes's twin sister. A secret agent for the Imperial Secret Service, she appears to have been killed several times (usually by a breed of vengeful underwater squirrels), returning from the dead each time, before finally being stabbed to death by Mr. Benevolent.
- Perdita Weeks (First Series only) –
  - Poppy Bin, Pip and Pippa's younger sister. Appearing only in season 1, she dies (and, in an unusual twist for this series, stays dead) from a chill after being pushed into a river.
- Martha Howe-Douglas –
  - Flora Dies-Early, Pip's first wife. His courting of her is seriously hampered by her governess Miss Chastity Hardthrasher who would not allow any direct interaction between them. She (shockingly) dies early.
- Mark Perry (First Series only) –
  - Thomas Bin; Pip's father, who is missing, is presumed dead after an incident in his factory abroad. However, Pip discovers several clues indicating he is not actually dead. When he returns at the end of the series, he describes his absence as having been prompted by "opium ... lots of opium."
  - Mr. Henchman, Benevolent's mute henchman
  - A town crier; Pip learns from him that his investments, as recommended by Mr. Parsimonious, were extremely ill-advised.
  - Lord Backhander; Flora's father and the Secretary of State for Bribery and Corruption
  - King George IV
- Jane Asher (Third Series only) –
  - Lovely Benevolent (née Malevolent), Gently's mother who conspired to make her son evil in part by marrying the sadists Mr. Hardtrasher, Mr. Sternbeater, and Mr Whackwallop to act as stepfathers. She murdered both Hardthrasher and Sternbeater with a hatchet and a hoisted piano respectively, claiming that they had succumbed to illness.
- Raquel Cassidy (Third Series only) –
  - Miss Sweetly Delightful, Gently's first and only love. She married another, erroneously thinking him dead, and this was the final straw that led to his conversion to evil. Unlike her beloved Gently, Sweetly is good and sweet to a sickening extreme, to the point where she turns Gently from evil to goodness with one kiss. Unfortunately, after their marriage, she realises Evil is much more fun, leading her to become as evil as Gently once was, and he eventually grows bored with their marriage and kills her (but does not enjoy it).

=== Pilot cast ===
- Richard Johnson – Sir Philip ("Pip") Bin
- Tom Allen – Young Pip
- Joanna Page – Pippa Bin, Pip's sister
- Kellie Bright – Poppy Bin
- Kim Wall – Thomas Bin, their father (impersonating Martin Jarvis)
- Sophie Thompson – Agnes Bin
- Tom Hollander – Mr. Gently Benevolent "who was, ironically, a complete bastard"
- James Bachman – Servewell, Sir Philip's servant
- Laurence Howarth – Mr Skinflint Parsimonious
- Geoffrey Whitehead – Mr Hardthrasher (a parody of Wackford Squeers and Mr Bumble)

=== West End cast ===
- Dom Hodson – Young Sir Philip ("Pip") Bin
- Shane David-Joseph – Thomas Bin/Bakewell Havertwitch/Broadly Fecund
- Ashh Blackwood – Agnes Bin/Flora Dies-Early
- Serena Manteghi – Pippa Bin
- Rachel Summers – Poppy Bin/Ripely Fecund
- J. J. Henry – Harry Biscuit
- John Hopkins – Mr. Gently Benevolent
- Marc Pickering – The Hardthrashers

Every week, the role of the Narrator (Old "Pip" Bin) would be played by a different actor or comedian. They were:

- 3-7 May: Nina Wadia
- 9-14 May: Dermot O'Leary
- 16-21 May: Sally Phillips
- 23-28 May: Robert Lindsay
- 30 May – 4 June: Sue Perkins
- 6-11 June: Julian Clary
- 13-18 June: Adjoa Andoh
- 20-25 June: Craig Ferguson
- 27 June – 2 July: Lee Mack
- 4-9 July: Stephen Mangan
- 11-16 July: Jo Brand (replaced by Hugh Dennis due to ill health)
- 18-23 July: Tom Allen [original Young Sir Philip ("Pip") Bin]
- 25-30 July: Jack Dee
- 1-6 August: Alexander Armstrong
- 8-13 August: Stephen Fry

== Episodes ==
=== Series 1 ===
No.	Title	Original release date
1	"A Childhood Cruelly Kippered"	15 August 2007
The idyllic life of Pip, Pippa and Poppy Bin is ruined by the scheming of their evil guardian and Pip's incarceration in Britain's most violent school, St Bastard's (based on Dotheboys Hall).
2	"An Adolescence Utterly Trashed"	22 August 2007
Pip meets a mysterious aged crone who can help him escape from Britain's most terrifying school, with only a false beard and disguises of Admiral Nelson, a giant rabbit and a grandfather clock. But can they stop his evil guardian marrying his mother?
3	"A Youth Utterly Crocked"	29 August 2007
Pip must thwart the plans of his evil guardian Mr Gently Benevolent. Can underwater squirrels, oddly-placed church bells and a stint in the workhouse foil him in his noble quest? Or will Aunt Lily and her Gloucestershire racing cows save the day?
4	"A Young Adulthood Bitterly Dismantled"	5 September 2007
Pip finds himself saved from the workhouse with the arrival of a vast sum of money from a stranger. But new problems await him.
5	"A Young Love Mercilessly Dismembered"	12 September 2007
Pip is saved from the wreck of Admiral Hardthrasher's vessel by Aunt Lily on a raft of trained tuna. He returns to London, to find true (if brief) love with the beautiful but terminally feeble Flora Dies-Early. Pippa and Mr Parsimonious flee to the continent, with Mr Benevolent in pursuit, but his nefarious attempts against them are thwarted by Aunt Lily. Harry, meanwhile, tries to join the army to forget his love for Pippa, but is thwarted by an allergy to the colour red.
6	"A Life Sadly Smashed... Then Happily Restored A Bit"	19 September 2007
Things look grim for Pip as he faces a highly prejudicial court case to defend his masterful and eponymous invention, the Bin. Is he to be hanged, or will there be a last-minute escape?

=== Series 2 ===
No.	Title	Original release date
1	"A Happy Life, Cruelly Re-Kippered"	7 August 2008
Pip Bin struggles against the cruel plotting of his evil guardian Mr Gently Benevolent, recently returned from the dead. A plot is afoot to steal Britain's loveliest school.
2	"A Re-Kippered Life Smashed Some More"	14 August 2008
Pip and Harry find themselves building an entire railway network in their bid to catch Benevolent.
3	"A Recovery All Made Miserable"	21 August 2008
Pippa is lost so Harry makes a "Pippa Detector" which actually works! Sort of.
4	"A Restoration Re-ruined, Only Even Worse"	28 August 2008
Pip finds himself heavily in debt when he has to bribe the whole of the House of Commons.
5	"An Already Bad Life Made Worse but Sort of on Purpose"	4 September 2008
Full of self-loathing, Pip drinks some very strong gin, finds he is really quite keen on opium, and falls in with a gang of thieves. But is their Fagin-like leader Abraham Bagel all he seems?
6	"A Happy Life Broken and then Mended a Bit"	11 September 2008
In a parody of The War of the Worlds, the planet is in deadly peril when Gently Benevolent summons a massive Martian invasion. Is this the end for Pip, Harry and the rest of the human race, not to mention Pippa's goose sanctuary?

=== Series 3 ===
No.	Title	Original release date
1	"A Lovely Life Re-Kippered Again Once More"	29 October 2009
The evil Gently Benevolent returns from the dead (again) during a seance, and Pip Bin is in peril once more. Framed for murder by a half-man, half-pigeon incarnation of his evil ex-guardian, Pip Bin faces total ruin at the hands of his mortal enemy.
2	"A Now Grim Life Yet More Grimified"	5 November 2009
Pip Bin faces his most gruelling fate yet at the hands of his evil undead ex-guardian and an enormous quantity of cheese. But can the spirits of Harvest Festival past, present and future show him a way to redemption?
3	"A Sort of Fine Life De-niced Completely"	12 November 2009
Pip Bin strives to improve working conditions in his Bin factory, and to end poverty once and for all using Harry Biscuit's anti-poverty cannon. But will his quest distract him from a dastardly plan to steal London and sell it to the French?
4	"A Horrible Life Un-ruined then Re-ruinated a Lot"	19 November 2009
Pip, Harry, Pippa and Ripely are reduced to abject poverty on the banks of the Thames. Will Pip and Harry be able to find work, or will they have to end their days eating mud and listening to the gloating of Mr Benevolent?
5	"An Evil Life Sort of Explained"	26 November 2009
Pip Bin, Harry Biscuit and Gently Benevolent find themselves trapped in the vast emptiness of space. As their doom looks increasingly inevitable, Mr Benevolent finally explains just why it is that he is so very, very evil – it is thanks to thwarted love, his stepfathers' cruelty and a family ancestry reaching back to Judas' accountant, in a parody of Great Expectations.
6	"Lives Lost, Ruined, Wrecked and Redeemed"	3 December 2009
Pip and Ripely find themselves facing a vast and evil undead army. England has only one hope – that Miss Sweetly Delightful can melt Mr Benevolent's cruel, undead heart.

=== Series 4 ===
No.	Title	Original release date
1	"A Tolerable Life De-Happified"	11 November 2010
Pip must enlist the help of his former nemesis to fight a new evil spreading terror and cake-crumbs through the streets of London.
2	"A Now-Spoiled Life Smashed Some More"	18 November 2010
Pip and Harry journey to the Underworld to rescue Ripely, only to find the evil Mr Benevolent has got there first.
3	"A Wretched Life Made Much, Much Sadder"	25 November 2010
After an embarrassing disaster involving a bridge and a train full of puppies and orphans, Pip and Harry travel to America on the SS Massive Britain, where Pip begins a reading tour. But all is not as it seems and Mr Benevolent lures our hero into a gunfight at the "All Right I Suppose Corral".
4	"A Painful Life Further Re-Miserabled"	2 December 2010
Pip and Harry put to sea with Captain Beehab in a bid to thwart a sea-going Mr Benevolent and rescue Ripely. But fate has other plans and they are shipwrecked. Pip soon finds himself on a desert island that holds many surprising secrets.
5	"A Now Tricky Life Woefully Miseried Up"	9 December 2010
Pip and Harry have escaped the exploding desert island, but Harry has been transformed into a dinosaur. Now they must catch Mr Benevolent and prevent him taking over the world, but the trail has led them to France. Here they must face unimaginable horrors including a bacon-free breakfast and a deadly confrontation in a cheese mine. But there is a glimmer of hope in the form of The Scarlet Pimple.
6	"A Life Destroyed Then Repaired and Rehappied"	16 December 2010
Pip, Pippa, the Reverend Fecund and Harry Biscuit (now just a brain in a jar) have tracked Mr Benevolent to the heart of the vast Russian Empire. But when they find him he is at the head of a mighty army. Who will triumph in the final battle between good and evil? Will Harry get a new body? Will Mr Benevolent detonate his infamous cheese bomb? And what is the correct way to spell 'Tsar'? As fate decides these crucial questions it seems there are a few surprises in store for Pip.

=== Series 5 ===
No.	Title	Original release date
1	"A Pleasant Yet Dull Life Re-Evilled"	20 November 2012
Pip Bin is beginning to miss the conflict with his absent evil nemesis Mr Gently Benevolent when he receives an intriguing invitation to a house party with Britain's poshest man, the Baron-Viscount-Marqu-earl-et the Lord-Dukey Clampvulture of Too-Many Titles. But one of the other guests may not be all he seems.
2	"A Re-Excited Life Made Distinctly Dangerous"	27 November 2012
Pip and his friends travel to India in their quest to thwart the evil machinations of smooth but sinister genius Mr Gently Benevolent.
3	"An Alrightish Life Savagely Frozen to Bits"	4 December 2012
Pip races to Antarctica to thwart another fiendish plot by his evil ex-guardian, Mr Gently Benevolent.
4	"A Writerly Life Made Dreadfully Different"	11 December 2012
Pip and Charles Dickens engage in a novel-writing showdown to find out who is the greatest writer in Britain.
5	"A Terrifying Life Made Even Scarier a Bit Some More"	18 December 2012
Harry Biscuit becomes evilly possessed after using the Possessed Pen of Penrith, which turns his heart to inky black. Pip and Gently Benevolent join forces to take on this new, cruel and cake-obsessed nemesis and his army of robot swans. They also turn out to share a love of antiquing in the Cotswolds.
6	"A Loved-Up Life Potentially Totally Annihilated"	25 December 2012
Mister Gently Benevolent unveils an advent calendar of evil that will culminate on Christmas Day with the total destruction of the universe. Only one man can prevent the end of everything for all time. But at a terrible terrible cost. Is this the end for our hero Pip? Or is it curtains for the whole of creation? And does that mean Harry needn't get Pippa a Christmas present?
