= James Bachman =

English comedian, actor and writer

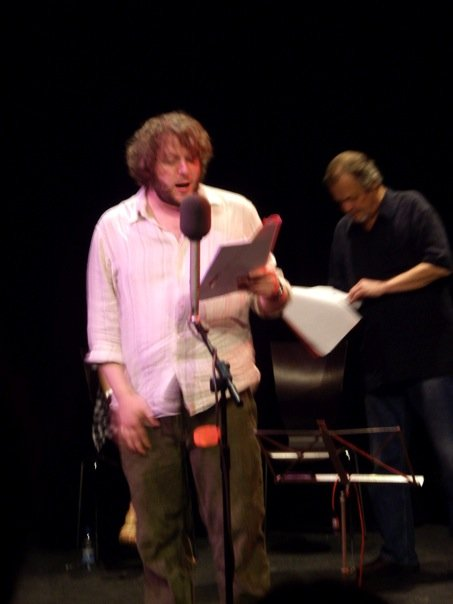
- James Bachman recording the BBC Radio 4 comedy pilot Zoom, 6 May 2008.
- Born: James Hamilton Bachman; 24 February 1972 (age 54); Cuckfield, Sussex, England
- Education: Emmanuel College, Cambridge
- Occupations: Comedian, actor, writer
- Years active: 1996–present

James Hamilton Bachman (born 24 February 1972) is an English comedian, actor and writer. He has written for and acted in many British television and radio programmes, including That Mitchell and Webb Look, Saxondale, Bleak Expectations and Sorry, I've Got No Head. In 2014, he had a small role in the film Transformers: Age of Extinction.

== Early life ==
Bachman was born in Cuckfield, West Sussex to American father Thomas Edwin Bachman, of Meadow House, Battle, East Sussex, and English mother Carolyn, daughter of Major-General Godfrey John Hamilton, CBE, DSO, of The Old House, Hailsham, Sussex, and writer Mary Margaret Kaye, daughter of Lt-Col Sir Cecil Kaye, an officer in the British Indian Army and minister of Tonk State, India.

Bachman attended Radley College and studied Natural Sciences at Emmanuel College, Cambridge, focusing on Physics and Mathematics. He joined Footlights, having been a Monty Python and Fry and Laurie fan as a youngster. It was while in Footlights that he first met David Mitchell and Robert Webb, whom he would collaborate with for their shows, and also future writing partner Mark Evans. His other student comedy contemporaries included the writer and director Dan Mazer and the TV scriptwriter Robert Thorogood.

He became co-vice-president of Footlights in 1993 and appeared in and wrote for the 1994 Footlights revue The Barracuda Jazz Option. He returned after graduation to direct the subsequent revue Fall From Grace, which included amongst its cast Mitchell, Webb, and Matthew Holness. That same year he also directed a production of the Keith Waterhouse play Jeffrey Bernard Is Unwell 2, starring Mitchell as Jeffrey Bernard and Webb in multiple roles.

== Career ==
Shortly after graduating, Bachman began a short-lived sketch double-act with fellow Cambridge comedian Matthew Holness. Bachman & Holness performed their first sketch show Rummage in the Pleasance Attic at the Edinburgh Fringe Festival in 1996. Their second show Shoes debuted at the ADC Theatre in Cambridge the following year and is notable for including one of the first ever performances of Holness' character Garth Marenghi.

Bachman then went on to spend the early part of his career earning a living mainly as a comedy writer, starting as a solo writer for radio shows such as Week Ending, and then forming a writing partnership with Mark Evans. As a pair they contributed material to a huge number of sketch and entertainment shows for radio and television including The Very World of Milton Jones, The Jack Docherty Show, The 11 O'Clock Show, The Priory, The Richard Blackwood Show, Rhona, Ant & Dec's Saturday Night Takeaway, Popetown, Ed Stone Is Dead, That Mitchell and Webb Sound, and That Mitchell and Webb Look. As writers on That Mitchell and Webb Look, Bachman and Evans created several of their much-loved sketches including 'Numberwang', 'David's Chiropractor', 'Glucozade Port' and 'Bed & Booze'.

During this period he made a few appearances on TV in shows he was writing on as well as occasional roles in shows such as 15 Storeys High, The Robinsons and Comedy Nation.

Frustrated at the lack of outlets for sketch and character performers on the London comedy circuit, Bachman, along with Evans and Robert Thorogood, set up the sketch comedy club TBA-2 at the Latchmere Theatre (now Theatre503). (The name was a reference to London's 'first ever sketch comedy club' TBA set up by Henry Naylor and Andy Parsons in the mid-Nineties.) Regular performers included their university contemporaries Mitchell, Webb, Holness and Jonathan Dryden Taylor as well as The Four Horseman, The Trap, Stuart & Quigley, John Reed, Ben & Arn, Nick Doody, Andy Bodle, Spencer Brown and Georgie Morgan.

In early 2001 Bachman and Evans began a weekly live residency at the Etcetera Theatre in London, developing a free-form live sketch-sitcom under the title Work In Progress. Material from this residency became their first Edinburgh Fringe show Hmm... which ran at the Assembly Rooms. Bachman and Evans returned to Edinburgh in 2002 with their second show The Bachman and Evans Special Edition, which attempted to add DVD-style commentary and 'extra scenes' to their normal live-sitcom-adventure format. In 2001 and 2002 and 2002 Bachman also directed Edinburgh Fringe shows for Mitchell and Webb: The Mitchell and Webb Story and The Mitchell and Webb Clones.

At the end of 2001 Bachman joined Lucy Montgomery and Barunka O'Shaughnessy to form the clown comedy trio Population: 3. Their first show Gladiatrix was devised with director Cal McCrystal and performed at the Soho Theatre in London and subsequently at the 2002 Edinburgh Fringe Festival where it achieved some success. Continuing the theme of taking Hollywood films and reversing the sex of the main character, Population: 3 returned to the Fringe in 2003 with their most successful show The Wicker Woman (which was seen by Robin Hardy the director of the original The Wicker Man), and its 2004 follow-up The Elephant Woman, both devised with director David Sant.

Bachman was then invited to become part of the regular team behind Ealing Live!, a weekly live comedy show at Ealing Studios inspired by the format of the American show Saturday Night Live and the 1980s British comedy shows Saturday Live and Friday Night Live. He also became a regular fixture on the live character and sketch circuit in London, performing as Oscar Wilde, The James Bachman International Orchestra and Papa Christmas at comedy nights including Oram and Meeten's Club Fantastico, The Book Club, and The Pros From Dover.

In 2008 he and Evans recorded a pilot for Radio 4 based on the style of their Edinburgh shows comedy. The show, called Zoom, was written by and starred Bachman and Evans, and co-starred David Soul and Carla Mendonça with Jon Glover as Melvyn Bragg. It also featured a special guest appearance by Nicholas Parsons as himself. The show had originally been developed as a TV series with Absolutely Productions and was not picked up for a series by Radio 4.

Bachman has since appeared in regular and cameo roles in Saxondale, The Mighty Boosh, The IT Crowd, Jonathan Creek, Hyperdrive, Miranda, Peep Show, Rev. and Mount Pleasant as well as a number of other television and radio programmes. From 2008 to 2010 he co-wrote and starred in three series of the CBBC sketch show Sorry, I've Got No Head, appearing as some of the shows most popular characters including Ross, the only student at the North Barrasay school, Mark, the record breaker, Prudith, who with her friend Jasmine thinks everything costs a thousand pounds, and the beekeeper who thinks maybe his bees can help.

He was a regular member of the cast of both That Mitchell and Webb Look and That Mitchell and Webb Sound and in the winter of 2006 he toured with David Mitchell and Robert Webb as part of their live show The Two Faces of Mitchell and Webb.

Bachman was in all five series of the BBC 4 radio comedy Bleak Expectations, which ran from 2007 to 2012.

His film credits include the shorts Stiffy and Monsters and Rabbits as well as a cameo appearance in the Bain and Armstrong film Magicians. In 2013 he was cast in Michael Bay's Transformers: Age of Extinction as Gill Wembley, head scientist to the character of Joshua Joyce played by Stanley Tucci. The film was released in 2014 and became the first film that year to take one billion dollars at the worldwide box office.

In 2014, he played Tony McDonald in the first series of Millie Inbetween. The role was recast to Richard Lumsden in series 2, due to Bachman focusing on his music career.

== Filmography ==
Television
| Year | Title | Role | Notes |
|---|---|---|---|
| 2004 | 15 Storeys High | Erection Man | 2 Episodes 'Car Boot and Pigeon Shit' 'Vince The Shirker' |
| 2005 | The Mighty Boosh | Colin | Series 2 'The Legend of Old Gregg' |
| 2006 | That Mitchell and Webb Look | Various Roles | All 4 Series; Also writer |
| 2006 | Saxondale | Alistair | Tommy Saxondale's anger management therapist Opened every episode of both series |
| 2007 | The IT Crowd | Jeff/Dominator | 1 Episode 'Moss and the German' |
| 2007 | Peep Show | Role-playing Guy | 1 Episode 'Mark's Women'; Unrecognisable under a large mask |
| 2008–2011 | Sorry, I've Got No Head | Various Roles | All 4 Series; Also Writer |
| 2009 | Miranda | Quentin | 1 Episode 'Excuse' |
| 2011 | Mount Pleasant | Richard | 2 Episodes |
| 2011 | Rev. | Tim | 1 Episode |
| 2014 | Jonathan Creek | Rev. Hugh Chater | 2 Episodes |
| 2014 | Crackanory | Raymond Morris | 1 Episode 'The Surprise & The Crisis Plan' |
| 2014 | Millie Inbetween | Tony | Main role Series 1 |
| 2015 | Fried | Gareth | 1 Episode 'The Chicken Awards' |
| 2017 | GLOW | Bruce | 1 Episode 'Money's In The Chase' |
| 2017 | Ryan Hansen Solves Crimes on Television | Famous Writer | 1 Episode 'Eight Is the New Se7en' |
| 2018 | Me, Myself & I | Jeremy | 1 Episode 'There She Goes' |
| 2020 | Housebound | Stan | 1 Episode |

=== Film ===
| Year | Title | Role | Notes |
|---|---|---|---|
| 2005 | Stiffy | Other Corpse | |
| 2009 | Monsters and Rabbits | Kenny | |
| 2014 | Heart of Lightness | Max Buchanan | |
| 2014 | Transformers: Age of Extinction | Gill Wembley | |
| 2014 | Paddington | Sixth Geographer | |
| 2019 | The Mortuary Collection | Ralph Wilkes | |

=== Video games ===
| Year | Title | Role | Notes |
|---|---|---|---|
| 2013 | Assassin's Creed IV: Black Flag | Stede Bonnet | Voice |
| 2026 | Assassin's Creed Black Flag Resynced | Stede Bonnet | Voice |
