= The Bleak Old Shop of Stuff =

- Genre: Comedy
- Written by: Mark Evans
- Directed by: Ben Gosling Fuller
- Starring: Robert Webb; Katherine Parkinson; Finlay Christie; Ambra Lily Keegan
- Composer: Grant Olding
- Country of origin: United Kingdom
- Original language: English
- No. of series: 1
- No. of episodes: 4

Production
- Executive producer: Mark Freeland
- Producer: Gareth Edwards
- Running time: Episode one (1 hour) followed by three 30-minute episodes in series one.

Original release
- Network: BBC Two; BBC HD
- Release: 19 December 2011 – 5 March 2012

The Bleak Old Shop of Stuff is a four-part comedy series produced by BBC, which premiered on BBC Two on 19 December 2011. It is a parody of the works of Charles Dickens, drawing its title from Bleak House and The Old Curiosity Shop. It is a television successor to Bleak Expectations, a radio parody of Dickens which began in 2007, and with which it shares the writer Mark Evans, producer Gareth Edwards and actor Richard Johnson; while not a direct adaptation it shares the same style, atmosphere and sense of humour. It is directed by Ben Gosling Fuller, who also directed the show That Mitchell and Webb Look.

The main characters are played by Robert Webb and Katherine Parkinson with cameos and guest appearances from celebrities including Stephen Fry, David Mitchell, Phyllida Law, Johnny Vegas and Adrian Edmondson. Some of the cast from Bleak Expectations including Sarah Hadland, Richard Johnson, Susy Kane and Tom Allen also appear.

The series was commissioned to coincide with the bicentenary of Charles Dickens' birth. The last episode aired on 5 March 2012.

== Synopsis ==
The plot is set in Victorian London and revolves around Jedrington Secret-Past (Robert Webb) and his family: his wife Conceptiva (Katherine Parkinson), son Victor (Finlay Christie) and daughter Victoria (Ambra Lily Keegan).

The characters and themes are based on some of Dickens' most famous novels, including Great Expectations, David Copperfield, Oliver Twist and A Christmas Carol. Some themes of the day were referenced from time to time, including the anti-French sentiment, harsh corporal punishments used in schools, debtors' prisons, filthy living conditions in London and the large gap between rich and poor.

== Main characters ==
- Jedrington Secret-Past - the main protagonist, long-lost son of Miss Christmasham. He is an upstanding family man and owner of The Old Shop of Stuff, Victorian London's most successful purveyor of miscellaneous odd things. Portrayed by Robert Webb
- Conceptiva Secret-Past - wife to Jedrington. Portrayed by Katherine Parkinson
- Victor Secret-Past - son of Jedrington and Conceptiva. Portrayed by Finlay Christie
- Victoria Secret-Past - daughter of Jedrington and Conceptiva. Portrayed by Ambra Lily Keegan

=== Other cast members ===
Christmas Special

- Stephen Fry as evil lawyer Malifax Skulkingworm, a parody of Mr. Tulkinghorn from Bleak House
- Joshua McGuire as Fearshiver, Skulkingworm's clerk, a parody of Daniel Quilp from The Old Curiosity Shop
- Terrence Hardiman as Martin Christmasham, a man who went mad after having a dead goose thrown on his head by a young Malifax Skulkingworm (giving him the nickname of Martin Fruitcake whilst in 'The Skint') and failing to marry his fiancée - Miss Christmasham. Their son was Jedrington Secret-Past, and they were eventually married at the end of the first episode. A parody of Martin Chuzzlewit from the novel of the same name. 'The Skint' refers to The Clink Prison.
- Celia Imrie as Miss Christmasham, the long-lost biological mother of Jedrington, eventual wife to Martin Christmasham, and former lover of Skulkingworm. A parody of Miss Havisham from Great Expectations
- Judy Parfitt as Aunt Chastity
- Phyllida Law as Aunt Sobriety
- Una Stubbs as Aunt Good Spelling
- Richard Johnson as Uncle Writes Prompt Thank You Cards
- Johnny Vegas as The Artful Codger, an older urchin who failed his exam to pass for ne'er-do-well or vagabond. A parody of The Artful Dodger from Oliver Twist
- Sidney Johnston as Urchin
- Pauline McLynn as Maggoty, a 'treacle fiend' whom the Secret-Pasts meet in The Skint debtor's prison and has a habit of affectionately calling people birds' names, e.g. "my little songthrush". A parody of Miss Flite from Bleak House, though the name refers to Peggoty from David Copperfield.

Episode 1

- Susy Kane as the Duchess of Money

Episodes 1-2

- Adrian Edmondson as the evil Dr Wackville, headmaster of St Nasty's

Episodes 1-3

- Tim McInnerny as Harmswell Grimstone
- Derek Griffiths as Pusweasel, Harmswell's assistant
- Kevin Eldon as Servegood, Jedrington's assistant
- Blake Harrison as Smalcolm, pupil and friend of Victor's at St Nasty's
- Sarah Hadland as governess Miss Primly Tightclench

Episode 2

- Tom Allen as a Gentleman of a Cockney Persuasion

Episodes 2-3

- Llewella Gideon as Mrs Grumblechoop, a poor woman who saves and then attempts to exploit Conceptiva

Christmas special & Episode 2

- David Mitchell as Jolliforth Jollington, a man who swells to a large size when thinking about happy things, and who deflates upon thinking depressing things or by being hurt (e.g. being mildly punched). Loosely based on Wilkins Micawber from David Copperfield.

Episode 3

- Graeme Garden as Judge Harshmore Grimstone, Harmswell's uncle

Cameos

- Mark Evans as vicar of St Christmas (Christmas special), businessman (episode 1), peasant (episode 2)
- Abigail Burdess as Skulkingworm's mother in flashback (Christmas special), Mary-Anne (episode 1), unnamed woman in Jedrington's "dream" (episode 2)
- Dave Lamb as the Ghost of the Christmas Past from A Christmas Carol (Christmas special), Neverlost Dunthem (episode 3)
- Fergus Craig as poor person (episodes 1 & 2)

== Episodes ==
No.	Title	Directed by	Written by	Original release date	Viewers (millions)
Pilot	"Christmas special"	Ben Gosling Fuller	Mark Evans	19 December 2011	2.22
Jedrington's unknown past comes back to haunt him in the form of the bitter lawyer Mr Malifax Skulkingworm (Stephen Fry). Skulkingworm finds a loophole in the law and has Jedrington's shop confiscated and family thrown into the debtor's prison. With just hours before Big Ben strikes twelve to herald in Christmas Day, Jedrington must race against the clock to save his family before it is too late.
1	TBA	Ben Gosling Fuller	Mark Evans	20 February 2012	1.76
Jedrington teams up with a seemingly charming new business partner, Harmswell Grimstone (Tim McInnerny). But is Mr Grimstone all he seems, or is he actually massively evil? And what is the awful secret behind the cryptic letter that has disturbed Jedrington's wife Conceptiva so greatly that she has made her way to End-It-All Dock? As the Secret-Past family's fortunes rise, it looks like they are built on crumbling foundations indeed...
2	TBA	Ben Gosling Fuller	Mark Evans	27 February 2012	1.18
Stricken with grief at the apparent death of his wife, Jedrington begins to question the morality of his business empire until on Easter Eve he is visited by three terrifying ghostly rabbits who drive him over the edge of despair. Meanwhile at the hands of Miss Primly Tightclench the governess and Mr Wackville (Adrian Edmondson), headmaster of St Nasty's, the Secret-Past children suffer the worst extremes of Victorian education.
3	TBA	Ben Gosling Fuller	Mark Evans	5 March 2012	TBA
Reduced to poverty and gin addiction Jedrington is at his lowest ebb, until his loyal and true servant Servegood restores him to sobriety by the gentle application of a massive cudgel. Reunited with Conceptiva, the two take the evil Mr Harmswell Grimstone to court to demand the return of the business and their daughter. But when the judge (Graeme Garden) turns out to be Grimstone's uncle the case seems hopeless. Just when all seems lost, the family find the solution in the most unlikely place.
