= Stiffy =

Stiffy may refer to something that is hard, firm or rigid. It may also refer to:

- Stiffy (film), a 2005 short film by Jacqueline Wright
- Stiffy disk, an alternative name for the 3 1/2-inch floppy disk
- Graham Johncock (born 1982), Australian rules footballer
- A slang term for erection
- An award given at the Seattle's True Independent Film Festival
- A character in the early 20th-century "Stiffy and Mo" comedy duo; see Roy Rene
  - Stiffy and Mo, a comic series by Alexander George Gurney, based on the radio comedy
- Stephanie "Stiffy" Byng, a character from P. G. Wodehouse's Jeeves stories
- Adolphus "Stiffy" Stiffham, a character from the P. G. Wodehouse story "The Luck of the Stiffhams"
