= Sarah Hadland =

British actress (born 1971)

- Born: 15 May 1971 (age 55); St Albans, Hertfordshire, England
- Occupation: Actress
- Years active: 1994–present
- Notable work: Miranda (2009–2015); The Job Lot (2013–2015); Waterloo Road (2011–2012); Moving Wallpaper (2008–2009)
- Children: 1

Sarah Hadland (born 15 May 1971) is an English actress. She is best known for her role as Stevie Sutton in BBC One's BAFTA-nominated comedy television series Miranda (2009–2015) and Trish in The Job Lot (2013–2015).

Hadland appeared as the Ocean Sky receptionist in the 2008 James Bond film Quantum of Solace. Her other movie roles include Magicians (2007), Leap Year (2010) and Learners (2007). Hadland appeared in the comedy-drama television series Moving Wallpaper (2008–2009) as script writer Gillian McGovern, and had roles in the British comedy TV shows That Mitchell and Webb Look (2008–2010), Horrible Histories (2009, 2012–2013, 2015), The Job Lot (2013–2015) and Brotherhood (2015). She appeared in the BBC miniseries The Moonstone (2016).

== Early life and education ==
Hadland was born in St Albans, Hertfordshire, England, on 15 May 1971. During her schooling at Wilmslow High School in Cheshire, she became involved in amateur dramatics with the Tempo youth group (formerly known as SCAMPS) in Wilmslow. She later trained at Laine Theatre Arts.

== Career ==
Following her training, Hadland began her theatre career at the age of 19, appearing in musicals such as Cats and Grease in London's West End.

After six years, she transferred to touring theatre, including performances in Who's Afraid of Virginia Woolf?. During this period, she began to develop her talents as a voiceover artist, with credits including the white kitten in the Catsan commercial and the America surfer girl in a VO5 shampoo advert. She provided additional voice work for the PlayStation 2 video game Dragon Quest VIII.

Hadland's television career began with supporting roles in Bad Girls and The Bill, before she moved on to larger roles in the comedies Green Wing and Broken News. In addition, she appeared in the films Confetti and Magicians alongside comedians David Mitchell and Robert Webb, and BBC One's Learners. Hadland also played characters for their comedy sketch show That Mitchell and Webb Look. In November 2009, Hadland joined Miranda Hart in the BBC comedy series Miranda, based upon the BBC Radio 2 series Miranda Hart's Joke Shop and featuring the same principal actors.

From 2007 to 2012, she had a recurring role in the BBC Radio 4 comedy series Bleak Expectations, a parody of Charles Dickens' novels, and of Victoriana in general. Hadland provided the voice of Lily (née Bin) Sourquill, the daughter of Sir Philip ('Pip') Bin over the four series to date. She also voiced the characters Ripely Fecund (Pip's third wife, in series 2) and Miss Christmasham (a parody of Great Expectations' Miss Havisham, in series 3).

In 2011, Hadland was cast as the new English teacher, Linda Radleigh, in the BBC drama Waterloo Road. She also appeared in Horrible Histories on the CBBC channel between 2009 and 2015. From 2013 to 2015, Hadland appeared as Trish in the ITV sitcom The Job Lot, set in a busy Jobcentre in the West Midlands.

In August 2024, Hadland was announced as a contestant for the twenty-second series of Strictly Come Dancing, partnering with Vito Coppola. The pair ultimately reached the final, finishing as runners-up behind Chris McCausland and his partner Dianne Buswell.

| Week # | Dance / Song | Judges' scores | | | | | Result |
|---|---|---|---|---|---|---|---|
| Week # | Dance / Song | Horwood | Mabuse | Ballas | Du Beke | Total | Result |
| 1 | Quickstep / "9 to 5" | 8 | 8 | 7 | 7 | 30 | No elimination |
| 2 | Paso doble / "Freed from Desire" | 8 | 8 | 8 | 8 | 32 | Safe |
| 3 | Viennese waltz / "Hedwig's Theme" | 8 | 9 | 8 | 8 | 33 | Safe |
| 4 | Foxtrot / "Birds of a Feather" | 6 | 7 | 7 | 7 | 27 | Safe |
| 5 | Samba / "Do It, Do It Again" | 8 | 8 | 8 | 8 | 32 | Safe |
| 6 | Argentine tango / "Ready or Not" | 9 | 10 | 9 | 10 | 38 | Safe |
| 7 | Cha-cha-cha / "Like a Prayer" | 9 | 9 | 9 | 10 | 37 | Safe |
| 8 | American Smooth / "Proud" | 8 | 8 | 8 | 9 | 33 | Safe |
| 9 | Jazz / "Padam Padam"/"Can't Get You Out of My Head" | 9 | 10 | 10 | 10 | 39 | Safe |
| 10 | Rumba / "Chains" | 8 | 8 | 10 | 10 | 36 | Safe |
| 11 | Charleston / "Popular" | 9 | 9 | 10 | 10 | 38 | Safe |
| 12 | Jive / "I'm So Excited"; Tango / "Big Love" | 9; 9 | 9; 9 | 9; 9 | 9; 9 | 36; 36 | Safe |
| 13 | American Smooth / "Proud"; Freestyle / "Cabaret"; Cha-cha-cha / "Like a Prayer" | 9; 9; 10 | 10; 10; 10 | 10; 10; 10 | 10; 10; 10 | 39; 39; 40 | Runner-up |

== Filmography ==
=== Films ===
| Year | Title | Role | Notes |
|---|---|---|---|
| 1998 | Basil | Windermere House Chambermaid | |
| 1999 | Julie and the Cadillacs | Girl on Stage | |
| 2006 | Confetti | Sam's Sister (Jen) | |
| 2007 | Snow White: The Sequel | Additional voices | English version |
| 2007 | Magicians | Carol | |
| 2007 | Grow Your Own | Carla | |
| 2008 | Quantum of Solace | Ocean Sky Receptionist | |
| 2010 | Professor Layton and the Eternal Diva | Celia Raidley (voice) | English version |
| 2010 | Leap Year | Gaelic Air Rep 2 | |
| 2012 | Now Is Good | Caroline | |
| 2013 | Burton & Taylor | Kathryn Walker | |
| 2016 | Girls Rule | Angry Mob Member | Short Film |
| 2018 | Game Over, Man! | Cameo | |
| 2019 | The Queen's Corgi | Mitzi - Veterinarian (voice) | UK version |
| 2019 | Horrible Histories: The Movie – Rotten Romans | Irene the Iceni | |
| 2020 | The Understudy | Alison McQueen | |
| 2024 | The Nobody | Sarah | Short film |
| TBA | Daddy's Girl | Moira | Short film. Completed |

=== Television ===
| Year | Title | Role | Notes |
|---|---|---|---|
| 1994 | A Dark-Adapted Eye | Elsie | 2-part television film |
| 1998, 2001 | Bob and Margaret | Various characters (voices) | 5 episodes (series 1), 1 episode (series 4) |
| 2002 | The Bill | Mel Roland | Episode 18.74: "A Cry for Help" |
| 2002 | Doctors | Debs | Episode 4.16: "Too Late for Goodbyes" |
| 2002 | Bad Girls | Spike | 3 episodes (series 4) |
| 2002 | Daddy's Girl | DC Parkes | Television film |
| 2003 | Dream Team | Kate Kelsey | Episode 6.19: "More Than a Game" |
| 2003 | Sweet Medicine | Jill | Episode 1.5 |
| 2003–2005 | Fireman Sam | Penny Morris, Bella Lasagne, Mandy Flood (voices) | 16 episodes (series 5) |
| 2004 | Casualty | Sandra Lee | Episode 18.29: "Parenthood" |
| 2004 | The Bill | Lara Silliton | Episode 20.62: "Suicidal Thoughts" |
| 2004 | Peep Show | Karen | Episode 2.6: "Wedding" |
| 2005 | Heatwave | Pippa Connors | Television film |
| 2005 | Beethoven | Johanna van Beethoven | Mini-series; episodes 2 and 3 |
| 2005 | Mile High | Gina | Episode 2.23 |
| 2005 | Man Stroke Woman | Customer, Woman in Pub | Episodes 1.2 and 1.5 |
| 2005 | Broken News | Claire (Traffic Reports) | All 6 episodes |
| 2006 | Green Wing | Nurse | Episode 2.7 |
| 2006 | Saxondale | Tina | Episode 1.5: "Squirrels" |
| 2006 | Doctors | Wendy Driscoll | Episode 8.45: "Shadowplay" |
| 2006 | Great News | P.A. (Jackie) | Unknown episodes |
| 2006–2008 | The KNTV Show | Nietzsche (voice) | 13 episodes (series 2–3) |
| 2007 | The IT Crowd | Margaret | Episode 2.4: "The Dinner Party" |
| 2007 | Learners | Fiona | Television film |
| 2007, 2008 | Supernormal | Changerella (voice), Additional voices | 13 episodes (series 1), 26 episodes (series 3) |
| 2007–2008 | Singles Files | Sarah | Mini-series; 5 episodes |
| 2008 | Love Soup | Sarah | Episode 2.4: "The Menaced Assassin" |
| 2008 | Beautiful People | Miss Dunnderdale | Episode 1.5: "How I Got My Tongs" |
| 2008 | After You've Gone | Lisa | Episode 3.6: "Damaged" |
| 2008–2009 | Moving Wallpaper | Gillian McGovern | 18 episodes (series 1–2) |
| 2008–2010 | That Mitchell and Webb Look | Various characters | 17 episodes (series 2–4) |
| 2008–2011 | Inazuma Eleven | Actress (voice) | 41 episodes (seasons 1–2). English version |
| 2009 | 1 Star | Daisy, Lipsynchia (voices) | Television film |
| 2009–2010, 2012, 2015 | Horrible Histories | Various characters | 21 episodes (series 1–2, 4 and 6) |
| 2009–2015 | Miranda | Stevie Sutton | All episodes of series 1, 2 and 3, apart from 2.5 |
| 2010 | Royal Wedding | Sherry Garvey | Television film |
| 2010 | How Not to Live Your Life | Karen | Episode 3.1: "Don's New Job" |
| 2011 | Horrible Histories with Stephen Fry | Various characters | 4 episodes |
| 2011 | The Jury | Tanya Hawkins | Episode 2.2 |
| 2011–2012 | Waterloo Road | Linda Radleigh | 9 episodes (series 7) |
| 2012 | The Bleak Old Shop of Stuff | Miss Tightclench | 3 episodes |
| 2013 | Burton & Taylor | Kathryn Walker | Television film |
| 2013–2015 | The Job Lot | Trish Collingwood | 18 episodes (all episodes of series 1–3) |
| 2014 | Fly-High and Huggy | Huggy (voice) | 5 episodes |
| 2015 | W1A | Pilates Instructor | Episode 2.2 |
| 2015 | Ballot Monkeys | Kate Standen | 5 episodes |
| 2015 | Brotherhood | Aunt Debbie | 4 episodes |
| 2015 | Comedy Feeds | Linda | Episode 4.3: "Radges" |
| 2015–2018 | Bob the Builder | Dizzy, Lift, Vet Tilly, Betsy (voices) | 51 episodes (series 1–3). UK version |
| 2016 | Galavant | Catherine | Episode 2.4: "Bewitched, Bothered, Belittled" |
| 2016 | Comedy Playhouse | Fiona | Episode 17.3: "Stop / Start" |
| 2016 | Hoff the Record | Patricia | Episode 2.4: "Wedding" |
| 2016 | The Moonstone | Miss Clack | Mini-series; episodes 1 and 3 |
| 2016 | Marley's Ghosts | Carly | Episode 2.5: "Carly" |
| 2017 | Inside No. 9 | Fran | Episode 3.4: "Empty Orchestra" |
| 2017 | Ratburger | DC Grey | Television film |
| 2017–2022 | Daisy & Ollie | Daisy (voice) | 131 episodes (series 1–5) |
| 2018 | Hang Ups | Fiona Bellingham | 3 episodes |
| 2020 | Love Monster | Tiniest Fluffy Bunny, Actress (voices) | 26 episodes (series 1–2) |
| 2021 | Going the Distance | Rae | Television film |
| 2021 | Queens of Mystery | Rowena Walker | Episodes 2.1 and 2.2: "Sparring with Death: First and Final Chapters" |
| 2021–2024 | Murder, They Hope | Monica | All 7 episodes (series 1–4) |
| 2022 | The Man Who Fell to Earth | Lucy | Episodes 5 and 6: "Moonage Daydream" and "Changes" |
| 2022 | Sky Comedy Shorts | Catherine | Mini-series; episode 4: "Silo" |
| 2024 | Strictly Come Dancing | Herself / Contestant | 25 episodes (series 22) |
| 2024–2025 | Daddy Issues | Rita | 9 episodes (series 1–2) |
| 2025 | The Celebrity Apprentice: Christmas Specials | Herself / Contestant | BBC Children in Need specials |
| 2025 | Midsomer Murders | Ruth Gillan | Episode 25.2: "Lawn of the Dead" |
| 2026 | Death in Paradise | Deborah Shelman | Episode 15.1 |

=== Video games ===
| Year | Video game | Role (voice) | Notes | Source |
|---|---|---|---|---|
| 2004 | Everybody's Golf | Layla, Additional voices | English Version | |
| 2004 | Fable | Additional voices | | |
| 2004 | Dragon Quest VIII: Journey of the Cursed King | Additional voices | English version | |
| 2005 | Fable: The Lost Chapters | Additional voices | Extended version of Fable | |
| 2005 | Buzz! The Music Quiz | Floor Manager | | |
| 2006 | Everybody's Tennis | Carol | aka Hot Shots Tennis. English version | |
| 2006 | Medieval II: Total War | Additional voices | | |
| 2006 | Who Wants to Be a Millionaire?: Party Edition | Additional voices | | |
| 2008 | Everybody's Golf: World Tour | Sonia, Anya | English version | |
| 2008 | Viking: Battle for Asgard | Additional voices | | |
| 2008 | Fable II | Additional voices | | |
| 2009 | Overlord II | Mistress Kelda | | |
| 2010 | Fable III | Additional voices | | |
| 2010 | James Bond 007: Blood Stone | Additional voices | | |
| 2012 | LittleBigPlanet PS Vita | Mrs. Sunshine | | |
| 2018 | Ni no Kuni II: Revenant Kingdom | Additional voices | English version | |

=== Theatre ===
- Admissions
- Cats
- Grease
- Time and the Conways
- Who's Afraid of Virginia Woolf?
- What's in a Name?
- Strictly Come Dancing: Live Tour
- Fireman Sam on Stage - Penny Morris, Mandy Flood (voices)
- Canterbury 2025 Pantomime - Snow White, Evil Queen

=== Radio appearances ===
- Mr and Mrs Smith – Annabelle (series 1) – 2012
- Births, Deaths and Marriages – Lorna (series 1 and 2) – 2012
- That Mitchell and Webb Sound (series 4) – 2009
- Edge Falls – Valerie (series 1 and 2) – 2008
- Miranda Hart's Joke Shop – Stevie Sutton – 2008
- Bleak Expectations – Lily, Sir Phillip's daughter; Ripely Fecund, Pip's third wife (series 2–5) and Miss Christmasham (series 3) – 2007
- 20 Cigarettes – Lisa/Michelle/Caroline – 2006
