= It Is Rocket Science =

British comedy radio show

- Genre: Comedy
- Running time: 15 minutes
- Country of origin: United Kingdom
- Language: English
- Home station: BBC Radio 4
- Starring: Helen Keen; Peter Serafinowicz; Susy Kane
- Created by: Helen Keen
- Written by: Helen Keen; Miriam Underhill
- Produced by: Gareth Edwards
- Original release: 9 March 2011 – 23 April 2014
- No. of series: 3
- No. of episodes: 12
- Website: BBC programme website

It Is Rocket Science is a BBC Radio 4 comedy about the history and development of human spaceflight, written and performed by Helen Keen. The series also stars Peter Serafinowicz and Susy Kane and is produced by Gareth Edwards. It was first broadcast in March 2011.

The premise of the show is that, lacking a big budget, "award winning comedian and part time local authority temporary administrative assistant" Keen has built a ‘super computer’ named The Voice of Space to narrate her peculiar but factually accurate history of space travel, and recreate the voices of various of historical and illustrative characters. Throughout the series The Voice of Space is referred to as possessing the attributes/spare parts of various types of vintage home computers (particularly ZX Spectrum, as heard in episode 1) and household kitchen equipment. Keen has said that The Voice of Space's unique pronunciation of words such as universe (‘oooniverse’) which has drawn comment is intended as an affectionate tribute to the vocal styling of the presenters of her favourite space themed TV programmes, particularly e.g. Carl Sagan's pronunciation of Cosmos (which sounded unusual to her as an English person).

The radio series is an adaptation of Keen's debut Edinburgh Festival Fringe show, also called It Is Rocket Science, which, when it previewed at the Buxton Fringe 2008 was nominated as Best Show and won the Best Individual Comedy Performer award. The show then embarked on a tour of science and arts festivals throughout the UK and Ireland before being commissioned as a radio series.

A second series was broadcast in May and June 2012, and a third series in April 2014.

== Episode lists ==
=== First series ===
No.	Title	Original release date
1	"Episode 1"	9 March 2011
Helen Keen introduces the three fathers of modern rocket science. The little-known geniuses who transformed science fiction dreams of space travel into glorious science fact, and who were entirely admirable (apart from the one who was a massive Nazi).
2	"Episode 2"	16 March 2011
Helen Keen enthuses about the often weird and frequently wonderful early days of rocket travel. Featuring true stories of Space Nazis! Space Satanists! And Space French Cats!
3	"Episode 3"	23 March 2011
Helen Keen presents an entirely comprehensive and balanced history of the space race, from the secret creator of the first artificial satellite to the final swear words still echoing around the craters of the Moon...
4	"Episode 4"	30 March 2011
Helen Keen looks to the future of space travel. Will technological advancements lead us to alien civilisations? To parallel universes? Perhaps permit us to travel through time itself? Or is all that extremely unlikely given what happened with the trains last time it snowed a bit...?

=== Second series ===
No.	Title	Original release date
1	"Episode 1"	16 May 2012
Are there civilisations on other planets, and, if so, why do they never call?
2	"Episode 2"	23 May 2012
Funny, factually-accurate look at space travel and explosive nuclear propulsion.
3	"Episode 3"	30 May 2012
The women astronauts-who-never-were of the Mercury 13.
4	"Episode 4"	6 June 2012
A factually accurate but funny account of the history and future of space travel.

=== Third series ===
No.	Title	Original release date
1	"Episode 1"	2 April 2014
The funny but factually-accurate look at the science of space looks at how to get to Mars.
2	"Episode 2"	9 April 2014
A funny but factually accurate look at humanity's enduring obsession with UFOs.
3	"Episode 3"	16 April 2014
A funny but factually accurate look at the unacknowledged geniuses of the science world.
4	"Episode 4"	23 April 2014
Astronomical Errors: A look at how mistakes have shaped the history of rocket science.

== Awards ==
In 2013 It Is Rocket Science won the WISE Media Award. This was presented to Helen Keen by Princess Anne in a ceremony at the Science Museum, London. The show was nominated for the 2015 Writers' Guild of Great Britain Award for Best Radio Comedy and won the 2015 Royal Society Radio Prize presented by the Association of British Science Writers.
