= The Airport (radio show) =

- Country of origin: United Kingdom
- Original release: January 1995 – February 1996

The Airport is a short-lived radio show that aired from January 1995-February 1996. There were eight half-hour episodes that were broadcast on BBC Radio 4. It starred Roger Griffiths, Llewella Gideon, Felix Dexter, and Jo Martin. It was produced by Gareth Edwards

== Notes and references ==
Lavalie, John. The Airport. EpGuides. 27 Aug 2005. 29 Jul 2007
