= Edge Falls =

BBC Radio 4 comedy set

Edge Falls is a BBC Radio 4 comedy set in a retail park written by Paul Barnhill and Neil Warhurst, starring Mark Benton and Sarah Lancashire (series 1 only).

== Cast ==
- Mick - Mark Benton
- Sonya - Sarah Lancashire / Frances Barber (Series 2)
- Rez - Emil Marwa
- Valerie - Sarah Hadland
- Colin - Anthony Glennon
- Milosh - John Dougall / Stephen Critchlow (Series 2)
- Tina - Jasmine Callan

The authors, Paul Barnhill and Neil Warhurst, also appear as important extra characters in most episodes.

== Episodes ==
A total of eleven episodes were aired across two series.

=== Series 1 ===
| Episode No. | Series No. | Broadcast Date |
|---|---|---|
| 1 | 1 | 10 July 2007 |
| 2 | 2 | 17 July 2007 |
| 3 | 3 | 24 July 2007 |
| 4 | 4 | 31 July 2007 |
| 5 | 5 | 7 August 2007 |

=== Series 2 ===
| Episode No. | Series No. | Broadcast Date |
|---|---|---|
| 6 | 1 | 2 September 2008 |
| 7 | 2 | 9 September 2008 |
| 8 | 3 | 16 September 2008 |
| 9 | 4 | 23 September 2008 |
| 10 | 5 | 30 September 2008 |
| 11 | 6 | 7 October 2008 |
