= Popetown =

French-British adult animated sitcom (2005–2006)

- DVD cover
- Created by: Isabelle Dubernet; Eric Fuhrer
- Directed by: Phil Ox
- Starring: Bob Mortimer; Ruby Wax; Morwenna Banks; Jerry Hall; Matt Lucas; Kevin Eldon; Simon Greenall
- Countries of origin: France; United Kingdom
- No. of episodes: 10

Production
- Producers: Phil Ox; Heather Hampson; Stacy Herbert; Alan Marke; Yohanne Seroussi; Rebecca Ferrand
- Running time: 24 minutes
- Production companies: Moi j'aime la television Channel X

Original release
- Network: C4
- Release: 8 June 2005 – 17 May 2006

Popetown is an adult animated sitcom, billed by its producers as "Father Ted meets South Park". Originally commissioned for and refused to be aired by BBC Three, the series became controversial internationally.

== Premise ==
The series follows the doodles and scribblings of a student at school during a lesson. His drawings depict the life of Father Nicholas, who lives in a Vatican City parody referred to as "Popetown". He is charged with being the handler for the Pope (who is always referred to by his title, and never given any name) who is a complete nincompoop with the emotional and mental maturity of a 4-year-old. Father Nicholas must keep the Pope out of trouble, and make sure the general public does not find out that the Holy Father is a drooling idiot. Other characters include a priest who is a sexual deviant, an extremely buxom and vain nun who serves as the Popetown news anchor and a trio of corrupt cardinals who secretly run Popetown and attempt to get rich behind the Pope's back. These and other elements caused the show to be extremely controversial.

The original English-language version of the show features the voices of actor and Popetown writer Mackenzie Crook, Little Britain co-creator Matt Lucas, providing the voice for one of the cardinals, and actress Jerry Hall. Ruby Wax is the voice actor for The Pope.

The series was originally commissioned by BBC Three in the United Kingdom, but was dropped from scheduling without a screening in the wake of protests from Roman Catholics. The premiere screened on New Zealand's C4 television network on 8 June 2005. Despite never being shown on British television, it was eventually released on DVD in the UK by Revolver Entertainment on 5 September 2005, in Australia by Roadshow Entertainment and in Germany, where it was aired on television thorough MTV Germany, by Polyband. It was also aired on several MTV channels, including MTV Latin America, MTV Latvia, MTV Estonia, 2x2 Russia and others. The show was also banned in some countries (for example, Lithuania).

== Cast ==
- Bob Mortimer as Father Nicholas
- Ruby Wax as The Pope
- Morwenna Banks as Sister Marie
- Jerry Hall as Sister Penelope
- Matt Lucas as Cardinal One
- Kevin Eldon as Cardinal Two
- Simon Greenall as Cardinal Three
- Ben Miller as Priest

== Crew ==
The show was written by a team of seven writers:

- Kevin Eldon
- James Bachman
- Mackenzie Crook
- Isabelle Dubernet
- Mark Evans
- Eric Fuhrer
- Phil Ox
- David Quantick

Phil Ox also served as director and producer for the series.

The series was also produced by:

- Heather Hampson
- Stacy Herbert
- Alan Marke
- Yohanne Seroussi
- Rebecca Ferrand

== Episodes ==
No.	Title	Original release date
1	"The Double"	8 June 2005
2	"State Visit"	15 June 2005
3	"The Big Fight"	22 June 2005
4	"Trapped"	29 June 2005
5	"Possessed"	6 July 2005
6	"The Beautiful Game"	13 July 2005
7	"A Family Affair"	20 July 2005
8	"Career Opportunity"	3 May 2006
9	"Day Trip"	10 May 2006
10	"Derby Day"	17 May 2006

== Controversies ==
=== New Zealand ===
The Catholic Church in New Zealand had been considering laying a complaint to the Broadcasting Standards Authority. Bishops called for a boycott of all CanWest television and radio stations. C4 had received many complaints about the show but refused to pull it from its lineup. The series was shown on the channel in June 2005.

=== Germany ===
In Germany, where insulting religious groups is a crime, MTV broadcast the first episode on 3 May 2006. After an advertisement was published at the start of the Holy Week featuring Jesus in a chair watching TV (with the heading "laugh instead of hanging around"), both MTV and the series drew sharp criticism from some Christians in Germany; the office of the archbishop of Munich said it was investigating an injunction to block the series. Popetown became a topic of public debate, even though few had had the opportunity to see the show.

Several Christian denominations, along with conservative politicians and the Jewish and Muslim communities demanded that MTV withdraw the series. An Evangelical magazine has put up an anti-Popetown website, stoppt-popetown.de. The Archbishop of Munich and the parliamentary leader of the conservative CSU party in Bavaria demanded criminal prosecution of those responsible for the series under § 166 of the Penal Code, the "blasphemy clause". Edmund Stoiber, leader of the CSU, also demanded more severe punishments for slander of religious feelings.

Organizations like the IBKA and others argued that satire must be allowed and censorship must not take place. Supporters of the series brought forward the argument that Popetown cannot be forbidden, just as the Muhammad cartoons are allowed for reasons of press freedom.

After a discussion on MTV, which ended up with some 87% of online voters supporting broadcast, MTV decided to broadcast all of the other episodes. The experts taking position in the show said they would not broadcast it, but also not forbid it.

=== United States ===
The series has yet to be broadcast or released on DVD in the United States, but it has spread by word of mouth, YouTube, and file sharing networks. In the 20 April 2006 edition of his weekly column, Parents Television and Media Council founder L. Brent Bozell wrote an article criticizing Viacom for airing this anti-Christian series on MTV Germany as well as allowing a scene defacing Jesus Christ in the episode of South Park, "Cartoon Wars Part II".

=== Lithuania ===
In March 2007, the MTV Baltics network was fined 3,000 litas (€896) by the Lithuanian broadcasting regulator for airing a episode of the show that violated the country´s rule in showing religious imagery in television. In response, MTV Baltics executive director Marius Veselis joked about the audience of unmasking itself as a "sort of half-medieval, half-communist, sick culture".

== See also ==
- List of television series cancelled before airing an episode
