= Sorry, I've Got No Head =

CBBC children's sketch comedy TV show

- Genre: Satire; Sketch comedy
- Created by: Jeremy Salsby
- Directed by: Ian Curtis
- Theme music composer: The Newsmakers
- Opening theme: La La
- Ending theme: La La (reprise)
- Composer: The Newsmakers
- Country of origin: United Kingdom
- Original language: English
- No. of series: 3
- No. of episodes: 39

Production
- Executive producer: Graham Stuart
- Producer: Tom Miller
- Production company: So Television

Original release
- Network: CBBC; BBC One; BBC Three
- Release: 17 June 2008 – 12 August 2011

Sorry, I've Got No Head is a CBBC children's sketch comedy television series. The programme's cast originally consisted of William Andrews, David Armand, James Bachman, Marcus Brigstocke, Anna Crilly, Justin Edwards, Mark Evans, Mel Giedroyc, Marek Larwood, and Nick Mohammed. The series was produced by So Television.

Anne Gilchrist, former CBBC controller, has been credited by her successor for commissioning the series. Pixelface, another programme by CBBC, is inspired by the show's "Backstage Access" sketches. Sorry, I've Got No Head was axed by the BBC in 2011 after its third series.

== Reception ==
James Wignall of The Guardian referred to the show in 2008 as "Little Britain for kids", also stating that it was "on par" with Big Train, reached the heights of Maid Marian and Her Merry Men, and "easily outstrip[ped] the Fast Show." He reasoned that this was the show did not patronise its audience, and that its actors recognised a wider scope with which they could be "really very silly and surreal indeed".

In 2019, CBBC created a ranking of its own shows on social media, ranking Sorry, I've Got No Head as "God tier", an inclusion which Cosmopolitan said was "questionable".
