= The Bigger Issues =

Drama series on BBC Radio 4

The Bigger Issues was a half-hour comedy drama series that aired on BBC Radio 4. It was about an over-ambitious and incompetent fringe theatre company, and was written and performed by Dave Lamb (as Keith Daniels), Jim North (as Francis), Nick Walker (as Dan), and Richie Webb (as each episode's guest musician). It ran for three series from 2000 to 2003. It was produced by Gareth Edwards.

There were three series, though only Series 1 has ever been repeated on BBC Radio 4e (or its previous incarnation, BBC Radio 7).

Episodes: Series 1 (2000)

- 1.1 - Homelessness
- 1.2 - Disability (AKA Discrimination)
- 1.3 - Bigotry
- 1.4 - Homophobia

Series 2 (2002)

- 2.1 - Singing the Changes
- 2.2 - Monster Truck Drag Racing With Dickie Donald
- 2.3 - Hospital Radio With Terry Funny
- 2.4 - Ivan Donahoe's Thursday Essay

Series 3 (2003)

- 3.1 - The Crows
- 3.2 - Keith of Daventry
- 3.3 - Body Chemistry
- 3.4 - Escape
