= Susy Kane =

English actress and musician

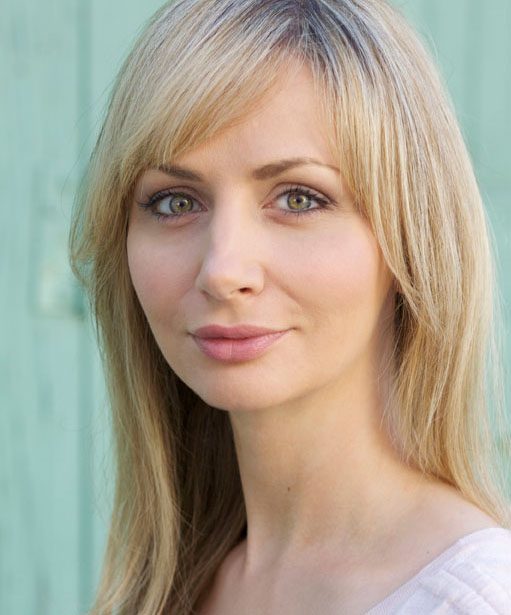
- Born: 27 August 1978 (age 47); Dorking, Surrey, England
- Occupations: Actress, writer, musician

Susy Kane (born 27 August 1978, in Dorking, Surrey, England) is an English actress, comedy writer and musician.

== Personal life ==
She is the daughter of opera singer Alison Warner and actor and writer John Kane, and the younger sister of comedy writer and actor Simon Kane. Her father is a former associate artist of the Royal Shakespeare Company and is the creator and writer of British sitcom Terry and June. She is of French Huguenot and Celtic ancestry.

She grew up in Wandsworth, London and won a scholarship to Westminster School in the sixth form. She studied Chinese, Art and Film at the University of Edinburgh. She lives in London and Los Angeles.

== Career ==
A singer, jazz pianist and classically trained violinist she started singing in jazz clubs when she was 16. She has written event music for the London Eye and played gypsy fiddle for the Charlotte Church album Tissues and Issues.

Her TV credits include Saxondale, Maron, Extras Christmas Special, The Thick of It, The IT Crowd, Lodge 49, Endeavour, A Touch of Cloth, Death in Paradise, and Agatha Raisin. She was also a leading contributor to Funny Or Die UK as a writer, actress and director. On radio she plays Pippa in the long running and award-winning comedy series Bleak Expectations on BBC Radio 4 and Andrée Melly in the BBC's award-winning recreation of the missing episodes of Hancock's Half Hour.

In 2012 she joined the cast of "Nickelodeon"'s "House of Anubis" for its third season as Caroline Denby. In 2018 she played Cynthia in the feature film Stan and Ollie with Steve Coogan and John C. Reilly.

In 2018 she narrated the Channel 4 Documentary "The Million Pound Holiday Club".

In 2019 she joined the cast of cult US TV show Lodge 49 playing Lamar's (Paul Giamatti) French muse Genevieve. In season 2 episode 9 she sings a French mariachi version of "The Impossible Dream". Her acapella version of Eden Ahbez's "Nature Boy" was also used in season 1 episode 6, and appears on the Lodge 49 Soundtrack album, which was released in December 2019.

Also in 2019 she starred in Comedy Central comedy pilot "Chasers" as Samantha Darling, opposite Rob Huebel, Matt Walsh, Gaten Matarazzo, and Cathy Shim.

She has written sketches for topical BBC radio sketch show Recorded For Training Purposes, BBC Comedy Shuffle, ITV's Comedy Cuts, BBC Three's Rose D'Or winning CGI sketch show The Wrong Door and BAFTA award winning series Harry and Paul starring Harry Enfield and Paul Whitehouse, also for the BBC. Her pilot script "Jurgatory" based on her time doing jury service sold to FX Channel in the US in 2014.

=== Television ===
Television
Year	Title	Role	
2022	Agatha Raisin	Gilda Benson	Episode 4.3
2020	Lodge 49	Genevieve	Season 2
2019	Chasers (pilot)	Samantha Darling	Comedy Central
2019	Death in Paradise	Ricki Dacre	season 8, episode 4
2018	The Million Pound Holiday Club	Narrator	
2016	The Coroner	Claire Bryant	Episode 2.5 "The Captain's Pipe"
2014	Endeavour	Miss Victoria Danby	episode: Nocturne
2014	Maron	Emily	episode: Marc on Talking Dead
2013	Common Ground	Francesca	episode: William & Sinclair
2013	House of Anubis	Caroline Denby	40 episodes
2013	A Touch of Cloth	Jill Tits	episode: Undercover Cloth: Part One
2012	A Young Doctor's Notebook	Beautiful Woman	season 1, episode 3
2012	The Revolting World of Stanley Brown	Terri	episode: Gut Instinct
2012	Bad Education	Mrs. Lythgoe	episode: Sex Education
2012	The Bleak Old Shop of Stuff	Duchess of Money	season 1, episode 1
2012	Starlings	Jo	season 1, episode 6
2011	Navelgazing Presents...	Emily Wolsley/Sandra Evans/Waaf/Gap Year Student	7 episodes
2011	White Van Man	Lucy	episode: The Morning After
2011	Hattie	Young Actress	TV movie
2011	Mongrels	Willis Bund	episode; Marion and the Force-Field
2010	Misfits	Presenter	season 2, episode 3
2010	The Increasingly Poor Decisions of Todd Margaret	Barbara	episode: What Can Only be Considered a Dreadful Day for Todd
2010	The IT Crowd	Female Bones	episode: Reynholm vs Reynholm
2009	The Thick Of It	BBC Producer	season 3, episode 8
2009	Scoop	Mrs. Frobisher	episode Cat=Astrophe
2009	Things Talk	Coat / Toothbrush / Egg	voice
2008	Parents of the Band	Diane	season 1, episode 1
2008	Gavin & Stacey	Reporter	season 2, episode 4
2008	Comedy Cuts	Jennifer	3 episodes
2007	Extras	Amy	Christmas Special
2007	Saxondale	Reporter	season 2, episode 5
2007	Comedy Shuffle	Cinderella	episode: Brendon Burns
2001	G Force	Samantha	episode: G4ce
1999–2000	Barmy Aunt Boomerang	Ms. Goodbody	20 episodes

=== Radio ===
- It Is Rocket Science
- Bleak Expectations
- Bullet at Balmains
- Recorded For Training Purposes
- The Missing Hancocks

=== Film ===
- Bill (2015)
- Resurrecting Bill
- Stan & Ollie (2018)
