= The Big Town All Stars =

UK radio programme (1998–2001)

- Genre: Situation comedy
- Running time: 30 minutes
- Country of origin: United Kingdom
- Language(s): English
- Home station: BBC Radio 4
- Syndicates: BBC Radio 7
- Starring: Stephen Tompkinson; Nicola Walker; Adrian Scarborough; Meera Syal; Clive Rowe; Brian Bovell
- Created by: Bill Dare
- Written by: Sam Bain Jon Holmes Andy Hurst
- Produced by: Gareth Edwards
- Original release: 19 March 1998 – 24 July 2001
- No. of series: 2 (plus pilot)
- No. of episodes: 9
- Audio format: Stereo

The Big Town All Stars was a short-lived BBC radio programme that aired from March 1998—July 2001. There were nine half-hour episodes and it was broadcast on BBC Radio 4. It was created by Bill Dare and starred Stephen Tompkinson, Nicola Walker, Adrian Scarborough, Meera Syal, Clive Rowe and Brian Bovell. The plot revolved around the members of an amateur a cappella group as they tried for success.

== Episodes ==
- Pilot, 19 March 1998
- If You Scratch My Back, 16 February 2000
- The Perfect Man, 23 February 2000
- If You Sack Me, I'll Leave, 1 March 2000
- Band of Gold, 8 March 2000
- Meet the Wife, 3 July 2001
- Fifteen Minutes of Fame, 10 July 2001
- East Coast Story, 17 July 2001
- The Ballad of Kenny and Christine, 24 July 2001

== Notes and references ==
- Lavalie, John. "The Big Town All Stars". EpGuides. Archived from the original on 1 July 2020.
