= Ready or Not (game show) =

British comedy game show

- Genre: Game show
- Written by: David Reilly
- Directed by: Paul Young
- Presented by: Tom Allen; Matthew Crosby; London Hughes; Sam & Mark; Matt Ralph
- Narrated by: Paddy McGuinness; Barry Castagnola
- Theme music composer: Drostan Roderick Paul Vye; Credited as Dobs Vye
- Country of origin: United Kingdom
- Original language: English
- No. of seasons: 1
- No. of episodes: 6

Production
- Executive producers: Kalpana Patel-Knight; Ted Hill; Matt Tiffin
- Producers: Stuart Harrison; Tom Williams
- Production location: Various filming locations
- Camera setup: Multi-camera setup
- Running time: 30 minutes
- Production companies: Remedy Productions; Argonon

Original release
- Network: BBC One
- Release: 31 March – 5 May 2018

Ready or Not is a British comedy game show that was broadcast by the BBC from 31 March 2018 until 5 May 2018. It aired on the TV channel BBC One and it was also made available on-demand on the BBC iPlayer. The show featured actors and hosts handing out cash prizes to unsuspecting members of the public if the member of the public approached answered a series of questions correctly in order to win the cash. If the member of the public who was approached by the host has accepted the offer of competing on the show in a random quiz, but they do not win, they do not win the cash prize either. These segments took place in city and town centres.

== Transmissions ==
Series	Start date	End date	Episodes
1	31 March 2018	5 May 2018	6

== Segments ==
- The Lift: An unsuspecting member of the public goes in a lift, and they find themselves on Sam and Mark's gameshow. Either Sam or Mark waits with a prize in one of floors of the car park. The other host asks questions to the contestant. If they get it right, they head to the floor they choose in an attempt to find that prize. If that floor is empty, they have to try to answer another question before they can try another floor.
- Extreme Quizzing: London takes the contestants to the top of the Orbit tower slide and before they go, asks them questions. They get £10 for every correct answer they get before reaching the bottom of the slide.
- Crumpet the Talking Dog: Crumpet, a 'talking dog', asks three questions to a contestant, and if the contestant gets all of them right they win £100.
- Question Mark: "Question Mark" goes around town and city centres asking members of the public to answer a question. If they get the question right, they win £10.
- Surprisey Man: Diners play head-to-head against each other, taking it in turn to answer questions. A correct answer means the opponent's pepper pot will be lit up. The person whose object is lit up when time runs out loses. The winner plays for cash in a quickfire round.
- Don't Panic: Camille, an actor, poses as an art student to distract unsuspecting members of the public whilst the set for 'Don't Panic', Tom Allen's pop-up TV game show, is getting built in the background. Camille then diverts the member of the public's attention to the game of 'Don't Panic' once the set has been built, where they can play and win over £1,000 if all questions are answered correctly.

== International versions ==
Country	Title	Channel	Presenter(s)	Premiere date	End date
Spain	¿Juegas o qué?	La 1	Adriana Abenia, Alberto Arruty, Amanda Párraga, David Amor, Leonor Lavado, Luís Larrodera, Manu Sánchez Vázquez, Raúl Cano Cano and Teresa Sánchez	15 July 2019	21 September 2019
