= Tom Allen (comedian) =

British comedian (born 1983)

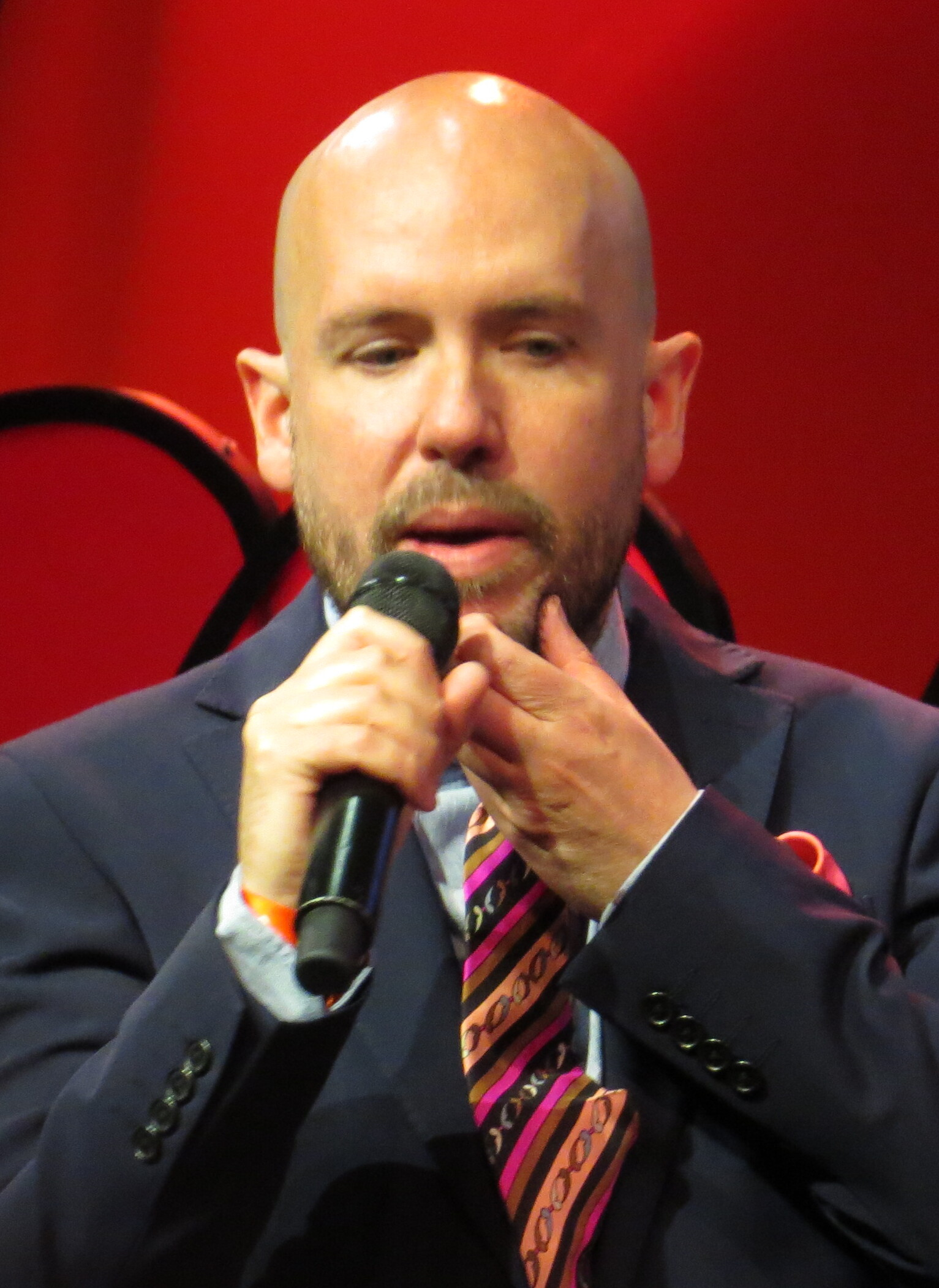
- Tom Allen at the 2023 Hay Festival
- Born: 14 June 1983 (age 43); Bromley, Greater London, England
- Education: National Youth Theatre
- Occupations: Comedian, actor, writer and presenter
- Years active: 2005–present
- Known for: Bake Off: The Professionals; The Great British Bake Off: An Extra Slice; So You Think You're Funny; The Apprentice: You're Fired!; It'll Be Alright on the Night
- Website: tomindeed.com

Tom Allen (born 14 June 1983) is an English comedian, singer, actor, writer and presenter. His breakthrough as a comedian came when he won the So You Think You're Funny contest in 2005, at the Edinburgh Festival Fringe.

His screen credits as an actor include Colour Me Kubrick (2005), Starter for Ten (2006), Sensitive Skin (2007), TNT Show (2009) and Tamara Drewe (2010).

On television as host or in guest appearances, credits include 8 Out of 10 Cats Does Countdown, Live at the Apollo, The Dog Ate My Homework, The Crystal Maze, Mock the Week, Big Brother's Big Mouth, Big Brother's Little Brother, Ready or Not, Bake Off: The Professionals, The Great British Bake Off, The Great British Bake Off: An Extra Slice, The Great Christmas Bake Off, The Apprentice: You're Fired!, Hypothetical, Richard Osman's House of Games, QI, Celebrity Catchphrase, Tipping Point, Cooking with the Stars, the British Comedy Awards, and It'll Be Alright on the Night (2025).

== Early life and education ==
Allen was born on 14 June 1983 in Bromley, Greater London. He attended Coopers School in Chislehurst. He trained with the National Youth Theatre, performing with the company in London and Manchester, in addition to working on outreach projects, films and also forming part of their Company Management Team.

== Career ==
In 2005, at the age of 22, Allen won the UK comedy newcomer award, So You Think You're Funny. The same year, he won the BBC New Comedy Award. In 2016, he supported Sarah Millican on her sold-out tour of Australia, New Zealand and the UK. He has also supported Josh Widdicombe, Romesh Ranganathan and Michael McIntyre.

After a sell-out run of his show Indeed at the Edinburgh Festival in 2016, he returned to The Pleasance in Edinburgh the following year with his show Absolutely. Allen subsequently embarked on his first solo tour around the UK in September 2017; he extended the tour into 2018, including two London runs at the Soho Theatre.

=== Film and television ===
Allen's film work includes appearing with John Malkovich in Colour Me Kubrick (2005), working alongside James McAvoy and Mark Gatiss in Starter for Ten (2006), and starring alongside Gemma Arterton in Tamara Drewe (2010).

In 2003, he played Prince Albert in a BBC One documentary drama, Looking for Victoria. For the BBC, he has appeared in the series Sensitive Skin (2007), and The Cut, as well as biopics of Fanny Cradock (Fear of Fanny) and Frankie Howerd (Rather You Than Me). In 2008, Allen made his own documentary about identity for E4, titled Who Is Tom Allen?. In 2009, Allen appeared on Channel 4's weekly TNT Show, writing and presenting Dictionary Corner. He also appeared on Law of the Playground.

In August 2015 and March 2016, Allen appeared as a Dictionary Corner guest on 8 Out of 10 Cats Does Countdown. In October 2016, he appeared as a guest on BBC2's The Great British Bake Off: An Extra Slice; In January 2017, he made his debut on Live at the Apollo, in an episode hosted by Sarah Millican. The following month, he appeared as a panellist on the CBBC show The Dog Ate My Homework. In July 2017, he appeared on a celebrity special version of gameshow The Crystal Maze and – an hour later the same night – on Mock the Week.

He has also appeared on Big Brother's Big Mouth, and Big Brother's Little Brother.

In 2018, Allen appeared on the BBC One comedy quiz show Ready or Not. He hosted Bake Off: The Professionals, with former contestant from The Great British Bake Off Liam Charles, but left before season 5 where he was replaced by Stacey Solomon. He joined the 2018 series as a regular contributor of The Great British Bake Off: An Extra Slice.

In 2019, it was announced that he would become the new host from Series 15 of The Apprentice: You're Fired!, taking over from Rhod Gilbert. On 14 January, it was announced he will be stepping down as host of the show. Angela Scanlon was announced as the new host. Allen also appeared in an episode of Josh Widdicombe's show Hypothetical.

Allen competed on Richard Osman's House of Games in 2020, alongside Chizzy Akudolu, Charlie Higson, and Kate Williams. He also made two appearances on QI in the same year, and appeared again on Hypothetical.

In December 2020, Allen co hosted The Great Christmas Bake Off alongside Matt Lucas as a replacement for Noel Fielding due to his paternity leave following the birth of his second child.

On 20 February 2021, Allen appeared as a contestant on the ITV game show Celebrity Catchphrase. On 11 April 2021, Allen appeared as a contestant on the ITV quiz show Tipping Point.

Also in 2021, Allen presented Tom Allen's Quizness for Channel 4 (a five-part series, first shown on 14 May 2021) and was signed up to present ITV/Marks & Spencer's Cooking with the Stars, a competitive cookery show which aired its first episode on Tuesday 13 July.

In late 2021, Allen was signed up to be the host of the first National Comedy Awards, a new annual awards ceremony which Channel 4 hopes will be the successor to the British Comedy Awards. Allen was going to present the awards at the London Roundhouse on 15 December 2021 (with a Channel 4 transmission date of 17 December 2021), but the first ceremony was postponed by the channel a week before it was due to be staged, due to the concerns over the Omicron variant of COVID-19. On 8 December 2021, Channel 4 said that event will be rescheduled for another time, though they did not give an indication to what date it would be or whether Allen would still be the host.

In 2023, it was announced that Allen would be involved in the BBC's programming around the 10th anniversary of same-sex marriage in Great Britain Big Gay Wedding with Tom Allen was first shown on BBC One on 27 March 2024.

In 2025, he took over hosting/narration duties from David Walliams on It'll Be Alright on the Night for its 37th series.

=== Radio ===
Allen has co-written and recorded two series of The Correspondent for BBC Radio 4. In 2009, he made guest appearances on Loose Ends and The Richard Bacon Show.

He took the lead role of young Pip Bin in the BBC Radio 4 comedy Bleak Expectations, which has so far run to five series (2007, 2008, 2009, 2010 and 2012), co-starring with Anthony Stewart Head and Richard Johnson.

In 2008, he recorded a radio adaptation of The Wooden Overcoat with Julia Davis and David Tennant, written by Mark Gatiss.

Allen has also guested as a panellist on BBC Radio 4's Just a Minute, in August 2015 and February 2017. He was also a guest presenter on the 9th episode of the 86th series broadcast in April 2021.

In 2018, as part of a series of comedy stand-up specials on BBC Radio 4, a programme titled Tom Allen Is Actually Not Very Nice was broadcast on 22 April. The show was then extended to a series with four episodes broadcast in December 2019.

In April 2021, Allen was Jay Rayner's guest on his BBC Radio 4 podcast, 'Out to Lunch'.

In 2024, Allen joined Virgin Radio UK and presented on Sundays at 12:30 pm–4:00 pm. He left the station in 2025.

=== Audio dramas and podcast ===
Allen portrayed Oliver Harper, the travelling companion of the First Doctor and Steven Taylor during a limited three-story arc in the Big Finish Productions audio dramas based on the Doctor Who series, released in 2011. His character is a city trader from 1966, who joined the First Doctor and Taylor in the audio plays The Perpetual Bond, The Cold Equations and The First Wave. Harper was the first ongoing companion created for the Companion Chronicles range.

Since October 2015, Allen has co-hosted the podcast Like Minded Friends with comedian Suzi Ruffell. He also guested on Ruffell's other podcast, Out with Suzi Ruffell.

Since September 2025, Allen has hosted Pottering, an interview-format podcast from his garden.

== Personal life ==
Allen is gay. He has spoken of his difficulties growing up as a "closeted, working-class kid in Bromley" and homophobic bullying at school, saying: "'Why do you talk about being gay all the time?' Well, it's because people wouldn't let me talk about it for the first half of my life!"

Allen lived with his parents until May 2021. His father died on 1 December 2021, aged 80, of a sudden heart attack.

He is close friends with comedian Rob Beckett. They have discussed their time at Coopers School and their friendship during appearances on 8 Out of 10 Cats, The Great British Bake Off, Sunday Brunch, and elsewhere. They have also frequently promoted each other's work.

It was confirmed on the BBC's Saturday Kitchen that Allen lives in Chislehurst, with him commenting: "Now everyone knows where I live."

== Bibliography ==
Allen has published two memoirs as of May 2023.

- No Shame (2021) Hodder Studio. ISBN 978-1-5293-4894-1
- Too Much (2022) Hodder Studio. ISBN 978-1-5293-9743-7

== Awards and nominations ==
- So You Think You're Funny (2005)
- BBC New Comedy Award (2005)
