= Watermill Theatre =

Theatre in Bagnor near Newbury, Berkshire, England

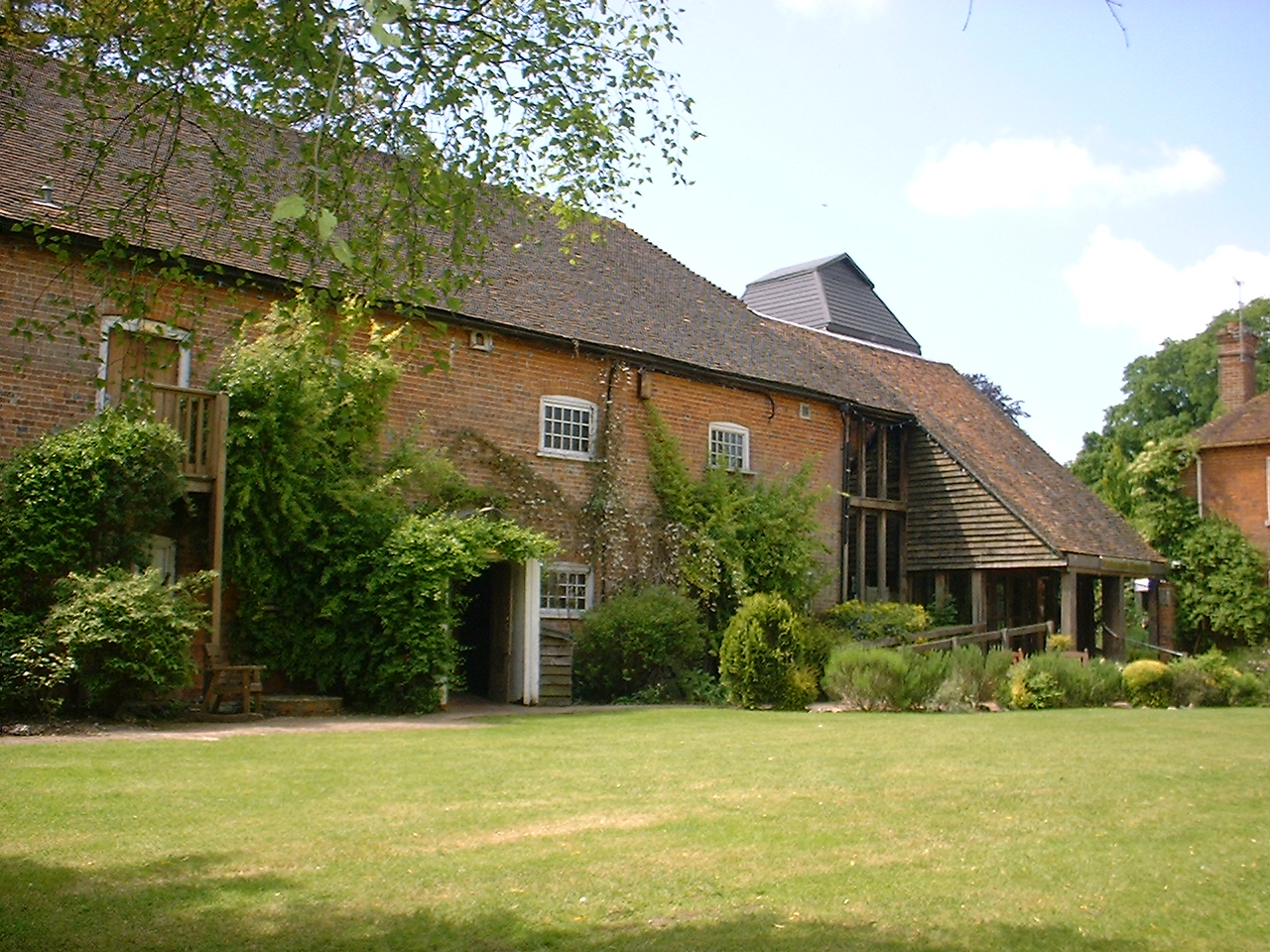
- The Watermill Theatre (2006)
- Interactive map of Watermill Theatre
- Address: Bagnor; Newbury, Berkshire; United Kingdom
- Coordinates: 51.421310°N 1.352471°W
- Capacity: 220
- Type: Repertory theatre
- Designation

Listed Building – Grade II
- Official name: Watermill Theatre, Speen
- Designated: 9 September 1969
- Reference no.: 1220572

Construction
- Years active: 1967–present

Website
- www.watermill.org.uk

The Watermill Theatre is a producing theatre in Bagnor, Berkshire. It opened in 1967 in Bagnor Mill, a converted watermill on the River Lambourn. As a producing house, the theatre has staged works that have subsequently moved on to the West End, including the 2004 revival of Sweeney Todd: The Demon Barber of Fleet Street, which also transferred to Broadway in 2006. The theatre has become recognised in particular for its focus on actor-musician led productions, and for focusing on accessibility within theatre. In particular, the theatre has pioneered the concept of Integrated British Sign Language performances, which is a style of interpreted performance wherein the interpreters perform on stage as part of the cast, as opposed to remaining by the side of the stage.

In 2024 the Watermill Theatre jointly won Theatre of the Year at The Stage Awards.

== History ==
The theatre is situated in Bagnor Mill, a former corn mill on the River Lambourn in Bagnor, Berkshire. The site is named in the Domesday Book, which references a watermill in Bagnor, though the current building is much more recent. It opened as a 113-seat amateur theatre in 1965, having been converted by David Gollins. In 1967 the theatre was expanded with the addition of a fly system and lighting control, and housed its first professional productions. In 1971, the auditorium was rebuilt to allow a capacity of 170.

In 1981 the theatre was purchased by Jill Fraser, who sought to change it from a local repertory theatre into a producing house. In the 1990s, the Propeller company was formed at the theatre. In the early 21st century, the theatre staged a number of productions that subsequently transferred to the West End – including Sweeney Todd: The Demon Barber of Fleet Street, and The Gondoliers.

In the mid-2000s, Fraser sought to sell the theatre to ensure its long-term future. The "Save The Watermill" appeal was founded to raise funds to allow the board of trustees to purchase the theatre. Fraser died from cancer in February 2006. In 2008 it was announced that funds had been met for the theatre's purchase.

Fraser was succeeded as artistic director by Hedda Beeby, who was voted Theatre Manager of the year in the 2014 UK Theatre Awards. Paul Hart, the incumbent artistic director, was appointed as Beeby's successor in 2015.

== Awards ==
Sweeney Todd (2006) received two Olivier Awards after transferring from the Watermill. Lord of the Rings: A Musical Tale was nominated for four WhatsOnStage awards and won Best Regional Production, in 2024. It also received eight BroadwayWorld Awards. That year, the Watermill and the National Theatre were jointly awarded Theatre of the Year by The Stage, and the Watermill was name Community Charity of the Year by the Greenham Trust at their annual awards ceremony, in recognition of their outreach programme.

== Touring and transfers ==
As a producing house, theatre that debuted at the Watermill goes on to tour the UK, transfer to the West End, or is reproduced internationally.

- 2026 – Barnum (starring Lee Mead) - UK tour
- 2025 – Calamity Jane (starring Carrie Hope Fletcher) - UK tour.
- 2024 – The Lord of the Rings: A Musical Tale – debuted in the US at the Chicago Shakespeare Theatre in 2024, transferred to New Zealand in November 2024, and due to tour Australia and Europe in 2025.
- 2023 – Bleak Expectations - West End transfer at the Criterion Theatre.
- 2022 – Spike (by Ian Hislop and Nick Newman) – UK tour.
- 2021 – Tell Me on a Sunday (starring Jodie Prenger) - UK tour.
- 2019 – Amélie – UK tour and West End transfer at The Other Palace and Criterion Theatre
- 2018 – Trial by Laughter (by Ian Hislop and Nick Newman) – UK tour
- 2018 – Murder for Two - West End transfer to the Other Palace.
- 2016 – Crazy for You - UK tour.
- 2016 – The Wipers Times (by Ian Hislop and Nick Newman) - UK tour and West End transfer at the Arts Theatre.
- 2014 – Calamity Jane - UK tour.
- 2008 – Sunset Boulevard (directed by Craig Revel Horwood) - West End transfer at The Comedy Theatre.
- 2005 – Sweeney Todd (directed by John Doyle) – transferred to the West End and Broadway.

== Community outreach ==
In 2024 the theatre was name Community Charity of the Year by the Greenham Trust at their annual awards ceremony, in recognition of their outreach programme.

The Watermill runs a "Careers in the Arts" programme, in collaboration with Corn Exchange Newbury, which provides young people with work experience, workshops, and traineeships.

== Notable figures ==
- Judi Dench delivered a talk at the theatre in 2024 as a special fundraising event.
- Patrick Stewart delivered a talk in 2011, discussing his experience as an actor, as part of a fundraising event.
- Sean Bean performed in his professional debut, playing Tybalt in Romeo and Juliet at the Watermill in 1983.
- Ncuti Gatwa performed as the Captain in the 2018 production of The Rivals.
- Audrey Brisson played Amelie, in Amelie (2019) and was later nominated for an Olivier award for this role.
- Jodie Prenger has performed in two productions at the Watermill, in Tell me on a Sunday and Calamity Jane.
- Bill Nighy began his career at the Watermill, first as assistant stage manager, and then in The Milk Train Doesn't Stop Here Anymore which was his professional debut.
- Craig Revel Horwood directed Sunset Boulevard! in 2008.
- David Suchet reportedly worked at the Watermill early on in his career.

Tom Attenborough, Rosalie Craig, Barney Norris, Caroline Sheen, Sophie Stone, and Sarah Travis have all been Associate Artists at the Watermill. Edward Hall began his professional career at the theatre, and is an honorary Associate Artist.

== Funding ==
The Watermill is a registered charity and receives funding from a variety of sources. It was previously funded by Arts Council England, as part of their National Portfolio Organisation funding scheme, which highlights cultural institutions that it believed to be of national importance. In 2022, the Arts Council announced the conclusion of a major review into its funding strategy, which resulted in many cultural organisations having their funding cut, including the Watermill which lost 100% of its funding.

The theatre also receives funding in the form of individual donations by members of the public, donations from Trusts and Foundations as well as through corporate funding schemes. Income is also generated through the sale of tickets for the shows, and sale of merchandise.

In 2020, the theatre accepted a £500,000 donation from the Sackler family, the billionaire American family accused of contributing to the opioid crisis through the drug OxyContin. In January 2024, the New York Times contacted 30 institutions which were previously recipients of Sackler money, 29 of which confirmed that they no longer accepted money from the family. The Watermill Theatre was the only institution which declined to comment.
