= Gareth Edwards (producer) =

British radio and television writer and producer

Gareth Edwards (born 1965) is a radio and television producer and writer. He is the great-grandson of Hollywood pioneer Albert E. Smith, founder of Vitagraph Studios.

== TV and radio career ==
He has worked on a number of radio and TV programmes including Comedy Firsts (ITV, 1995), The Big Town All Stars (BBC Radio 4, 1998), Spaced (Channel 4, 1999), The Bigger Issues (BBC Radio 4, 2000), Parsons and Naylor's Pull-Out Sections (BBC Radio 2, 2001), Dead Ringers (BBC Two, 2003, 2004), Posh Nosh (BBC Two, 2003), Vent (BBC Radio 4, 2006–09)

Edwards produced That Mitchell and Webb Sound (BBC Radio 4, 2003–09), which won a Sony Silver Award in 2004; he also produced the TV version of this, starring the same David Mitchell and Robert Webb, entitled That Mitchell and Webb Look (BBC Two, 2006–10), which won best comedy BAFTA in 2006. Edwards also produced The One Ronnie (BBC One, 2010), a one-off comedy television sketch show that aired on BBC One on Christmas Day 2010 to celebrate the 80th birthday of Ronnie Corbett and Still Open All Hours (BBC One Boxing Day 2013). He also produced the BBC2 sitcom Upstart Crow 2016.

He has also produced Bleak Expectations (BBC Radio 4, 2007–11), the cult radio show starring Anthony Head and the TV spin-off from this, The Bleak Old Shop of Stuff (BBC Two, 2011). Gareth Edwards also produced the short-lived radio comedy series The Airport (BBC Radio 4, 1995), which was the first radio comedy series in Britain to feature self-representative experiences of black people.

Edwards executive-produced the second series of Tracey Ullman's Show (2017) which led to the spin-off series Tracey Breaks the News (2017–present).

Edwards was appointed acting head of radio comedy at the BBC from November 2008 to May 2009, though announced subsequently that he was returning to producing and writing.

== Writing ==
Edwards wrote two series of Radio 4's situation comedy Artists, set in St Ives, Cornwall.

Edwards also writes children's books including The Big Animal Mix-Up (Hachette, 2011), The Big Jungle Mix-Up (Hachette, 2012), The Disgusting Sandwich (Scholastic, 2013), The Littlest Bird (Piccadilly, 2013), Never Ask A Dinosaur to Dinner (Scholastic, 2014), and Fabulous Pie (Scholastic, 2015), shortlisted for the FCBG award 2016.

== Family ==
Edwards is married to Frances Wedgwood, daughter of Martin Wedgwood and the architectural historian Alexandra Wedgwood. They have four children.
