= Jacqueline Wright =

Jacqueline Wright is an English director of film, TV and music promos.

Wright's short films include David the Great, a comedic homage to magician David Blaine; Out of Water, which was funded by the UK Film Council; and Stiffy, a comedy with a necrophiliac theme which premiered at the Cannes Film Festival 2005 and was shortlisted for the BBC New Filmmaker's Award in 2006.

Several of Wright's short films have been collaborations with writer and actress Alice Lowe. They also worked together on Lowe's 2005 Edinburgh Fringe stage show MoonJourney, a comedic rock-opera which spoofed Kate Bush, on which Wright worked as associate director. In 2010 they founded Jackal Films, making a short film each month of that year.

Her music videos include promos for Lowe's songs Sticks and Balls and Earth Birth, as well the Raindance/Tiscali Award-winning promo for The Shakes's single Liberty Jones.

== Filmography ==
=== Films ===
- "Stiffy" (2005, short film)
- "Out of Water" (2007, short film)
- "LifeSpam: My Child Is French" (2009, short film)
- "IMute" (2012, short film)
- Turn Your Bloody Phone Off: The Second Batch (2013, segments "Facetime", "Dickhead")

=== Music videos ===
- "Sticks and Balls"
- "Earth Birth"
- "Liberty Jones"
