= Saxondale =

British comedy television series

- UK DVD cover of Saxondale series 1
- Genre: Sitcom
- Created by: Steve Coogan; Neil Maclennan
- Written by: Steve Coogan; Neil Maclennan
- Directed by: Matt Lipsey
- Starring: Steve Coogan; Ruth Jones; Morwenna Banks; Rasmus Hardiker
- Country of origin: United Kingdom
- No. of series: 2
- No. of episodes: 13

Production
- Producer: Baby Cow Productions
- Running time: 30 minutes (per episode)

Original release
- Network: BBC Two
- Release: 19 June 2006 – 27 September 2007

Saxondale is a British sitcom, starring Steve Coogan and co-written by Coogan and Neil Maclennan. The series is directed by Matt Lipsey and produced by Ted Dowd. Coogan and Henry Normal served as executive producers. The show is set in Stevenage and depicts middle-class suburban life.

Produced by Baby Cow Productions, the programme's first series was broadcast on BBC Two from 19 June 2006. It features Coogan as Tommy Saxondale, a former roadie with anger issues who now owns a pest control business. Other principal characters include Saxondale's Welsh girlfriend Magz (Ruth Jones), and his naïve assistant, Raymond (Rasmus Hardiker). Morwenna Banks, Mark Williams, Greg Davies, Ben Miller (who script-edited the series and directed the first episode) and Liza Tarbuck also appear. Comedian Matt Berry composed the incidental music for the series and appeared in Tommy's therapy class as a yuppie-like character in two episodes of the second series. BBC America began airing Saxondale in November 2006.

According to a BBC press release, over the course of the series Saxondale "gets his eyesight improved by a prostitute, almost befriends a celebrity, kneecaps an annoying hippie... and experiments with women's makeup." Coogan describes his character as "genuinely witty, while still being a bit of a dick".

== Characters ==
=== Tommy Saxondale ===
Middle-aged pest-controller Thomas "Tommy" Gregory Saxondale (Steve Coogan) is the survivor of a hostile divorce who now lives with his girlfriend, Magz. Tommy speaks with an East Midlands accent and occasionally refers to his Nottingham heritage, though he and Magz live in Stevenage, Hertfordshire. An ex-roadie, Tommy regards himself as a maverick and a free thinker and takes every opportunity to impart his wisdom to his young assistant, Raymond; most of the time the wisdom he imparts is not quite as sound as he likes to think. In his line of work, as well as pharaoh ants, mice, and occasionally moths, Tommy has to battle with snowboarders, pigeon-loving activists, and people who talk about property prices. Tommy knows his own mind and isn't afraid to speak it; unfortunately, Tommy also has anger management problems, and when those around him don't give him quite the level of respect he feels he deserves, it tends to lead to explosions of temper that result in a few more visits to the anger management course. Tommy is devoted to his Ford Mustang Mach 1, although he drives a much less macho Bedford Rascal for work (from Episode 2 the Rascal is replaced by a Renault Kangoo). Tommy also resents that people often remind him throughout the series that he never toured with Led Zeppelin.

=== Magz ===
Margaret "Magz" Nith (Ruth Jones) is Tommy Saxondale's girlfriend. She is Welsh and is the proprietor of a shop called ‘Smash the System’ where she sells "shocking" T-shirts and posters, which she designs herself, often depicting cultural icons smoking drugs. Magz is level-headed and kind, acting as a stabilising influence when Tommy seems on the verge of becoming enraged. She is often seen painting iconic feminine figures such as the Brontë sisters or Joan of Arc topless or in overtly sexual positions. She and Tommy engage in an active and rather kinky sex life.

=== Raymond ===
Raymond Fahy (Rasmus Hardiker) is Tommy Saxondale's assistant and lodger. Thus, while Tommy enjoys talking about himself, training him in the mysterious and deadly art of pest control, and sharing a few life lessons, Raymond has little choice but to listen. The generation gap between Raymond and Tommy is reflected during their discussions about music, cars and life in general. He is very passive and rarely takes life as seriously as Tommy, often nodding or smiling instead of engaging with Tommy and his acolytes. He lives in Tommy's spare room and gets an uncomfortably close view of Tommy and Magz's sparky relationship.

=== Vicky ===
Vicky (Morwenna Banks) is an office manager for the agency that issues jobs to Tommy's Stealth Pest Control. Vicky needles Tommy with her bawdy, passive-aggressive sense of humour.

=== Jonathan ===
Introduced in series two, Jonathan (Darren Boyd) lives in the house opposite Tommy Saxondale. An upper-middle class executive, much of the humour is derived from Jonathan's failed attempts to engage and bond with Tommy. He will often try to use 'anti-establishment' language and refer to Tommy's car with names such as "the yellow peril", whilst Tommy pretends to not understand what he is talking about. In most of his appearances, he approaches Tommy outside his house when 'the residents association' have a petty complaint to make about Tommy, such as parking his car on the kerb or playing loud music, although he will often suggest he doesn't agree with them to try keep in Tommy's favour. He always starts conversation with Tommy (although showing an ignorance to Tommy's tastes or knowledge) and then, walking back to his house, clicking his fingers as he "remembers" that he has to tell Tommy about the complaint.

=== Keanu ===
Keanu (Coogan) is a recurring character seen in a number of episodes throughout the series. An unemployed, homosexual drug addict and a squatter, Keanu officially changed his name by deed poll to Keanu Reeves. Overtly flamboyant with a Mancunian accent, he is a stereotype of youth culture, personified by his preference for loud, fast electronic/dance music, an unwillingness to work and a promiscuous and carefree lifestyle. On a number of occasions, Keanu has displayed an unreciprocated liking for Raymond, Tommy's assistant.

=== Alistair ===
Alistair (James Bachman) is the therapist who runs the anger management sessions that Tommy attends. A calm and good-natured man, he frequently finds his patience tested by Tommy's unenthusiastic attitude towards therapy and his disruptive and aggressive behaviour within the sessions. The therapy scenes provide the cold open to each episode; Alistair is rarely elsewhere in the show.

== Episode guide ==
All episodes co-written by Steve Coogan and Neil Maclennan.

=== Series 1 ===
No. overall	No. in series	Title	Original release date
1	1	"Pigeons"	19 June 2006
Tommy attends his anger management course and clashes with the group leader, whilst Magz considers a new line of "FUCK OFF" T-shirts. Tommy searches for a replacement after sacking his previous assistant from his pest control business, as he needs a second man to convince Vicky to let him handle a "5 grand pigeon job." Eventually Tommy hires 19-year-old Raymond, who moves into Tommy's spare room at Magz's suggestion. When they turn up to remove the pigeon infestation, the pair are confronted by a knife-wielding animal rights protester.
2	2	"Mice"	26 June 2006
Tommy fights to save Magz's shop. He is also hired by the famous TV presenter of a motoring show (guest star Alexander Armstrong playing a Jeremy Clarkson-esque character) to deal with an infestation of mice.
3	3	"Wasps"	3 July 2006
One of Tommy's old roadie friends, Deggsy (played by Mark Williams), turns up. While Deggsy still clings desperately to the rock 'n' roll lifestyle, Tommy is embarrassed to admit he has settled down. He soon finds himself dragged around some old haunts for a night out involving prostitutes and economy vodka.
4	4	"Cockroaches"	10 July 2006
Tommy meets his daughter's new boyfriend (James Lance) and is determined not to come across as an authority figure. He changes his tune when he feels he isn't getting enough respect from his prospective son-in-law, and turns down an invitation to a party – a decision he soon has cause to regret.
5	5	"Squirrels"	17 July 2006
Tommy's convinced he's out of shape so he goes to the gym, but ends up over-exerting himself.
6	6	"Fleas"	24 July 2006
Tommy's car is wheelclamped, an incident that leads him into conflict with Bernard Langley (Ben Miller), owner of a rival exterminator company. Tommy is convinced Langley is involved in dodgy dealings and vows to expose his corruption.
7	7	"Janet"	31 July 2006
The future of Tommy's relationship with Magz is in jeopardy after his latest dreadful breach of social etiquette. However, he soon becomes tempted by a new woman in his life in the shape of full-figured client Janet (Liza Tarbuck). Tommy inspects the home of a deceased man, but becomes overwhelmed with depressive thoughts upon seeing that the home contained a can of potatoes, a sign that the man was unable to summon the will to peel and boil potatoes himself. The can of potatoes comes to symbolize the choice between a path that is easily accessible but perhaps unfulfilling, and a path involving greater struggle yet greater reward.

=== Series 2 ===
No. overall	No. in series	Title	Original release date
8	1	"Episode 8"	23 August 2007
Tommy tracks down an old friend, Malcolm "Rabies" Jessop (Simon Greenall) only to discover he now runs his own new media company and wears a suit. Tommy also revisits his past as a roadie by briefly stepping in to man the mixing desk of a Queen tribute band, only to discover that they too are far from the rock 'n' roll spirit he used to know.
9	2	"Episode 9"	30 August 2007
When inspecting a pigeon job in a warehouse, Raymond spots someone about to commit suicide on the roof tops. Tommy manages to talk the man round, and tells him (Martin, played by Kevin Eldon) that he can call him or come round for a visit whenever he feels sad and depressed. Martin begins to call round to Tommy's house on an almost daily basis.
10	3	"Episode 10"	6 September 2007
When some squatters (including Keanu) move into the area, Tommy's neighbour, Jonathan, invites him to a neighborhood association meeting to rally support for their eviction. Tommy sympathises with the free spirit of the squatters and decides he's on their side.
11	4	"Episode 11"	13 September 2007
Tommy works at a nearby private boys' school, an institution he considers to be conformist and straight-laced. He gets invited to talk to the children about the pest control business. The boys appear more interested in his roadie work for the Floyd and turn out to be more free-spirited than Tommy bargained for.
12	5	"Episode 12"	20 September 2007
A courtroom drama unfolds as Tommy defends himself from a charge of fare evasion. Featuring guest star Christopher Ryan.
13	6	"Episode 13"	27 September 2007
Tommy's blinkered views land him in trouble with Magz, who then seeks refuge with her Yoga tutor. Tommy goes to various drastic measures to try to win Magz back.

== Critical reception and legacy ==
Advance critical opinion of the show was favourable. The Daily Telegraph reported that it "brims with promise" and The Guardian described it as "very, very funny".

During an interview with Jonathan Ross on 12 September 2008, Steve Coogan announced that Saxondale would feature on his 2008 live tour of the UK. The character last appeared on the subsequent tour, "Steve Coogan Live - As Alan Partridge And Other Less Successful Characters", which was later released on DVD.

In 2009, American television network NBC announced, as part of a two-year deal with Baby Cow Productions, they intended to remake Saxondale for an American audience. NBC's senior vice-president of comedy described their aim to access the "creative sensibility" of Coogan and his colleagues. However, no further news on the project has been released.

In 2013, following the success of the Alan Partridge film Alpha Papa, Coogan told Empire magazine that he felt Saxondale could sustain a film; "What I liked about that character is that in some ways he was the butt of the joke, but he was also funny himself sometimes. Whereas Alan is never funny himself - he's just unwittingly funny. Alan's never going to tell you a joke that really makes you laugh. Saxondale might."

In his 2015 autobiography Easily Distracted, Coogan revealed that he preferred Saxondale to Alan Partridge due to the character having greater depth. The List magazine noted similarities in character traits shared between Saxondale and Partridge from Alpha Papa onward, noting that the development of Partridge seen in the Gibbons Brothers' writing, and the manner of Coogan's portrayal, had seen the character's persona develop in a manner that echoed the tone and characteristics of Saxondale.

== Theme music ==
The theme music is "House of the King" by Focus (which was also used as the theme tune to the 1970s science series Don't Ask Me). Additionally, all episodes have ended with an excerpt from "Hocus Pocus" by the same band.

Actor Matt Berry composed the incidental music used throughout the series. Excerpts of Jethro Tull songs have popped up, including "Cup of Wonder" and "Acres Wild" (in series one episode five, which also features an excerpt from "Squeeze Box" by The Who), "Velvet Green", and "Bourée", also excerpts from the album Argus by Wishbone Ash have been heard, featuring songs such as "Warrior" and "Blowing free".

The 1975 Rush album Caress of Steel and in particular the song "The Necromancer" (Part III: Return of the Prince) is referenced both musically and as a theme in Episode 6, Series 2, with Tommy and Magz discussing it at the end of the show. In another episode, Tommy claims that "Spirit of Radio" is the first song of Hemispheres while discussing a pest extermination contract- in reality, the track features on Permanent Waves.

In the second episode of series 2 there are two clips from the track "Wages of Peace" by The Groundhogs, from the 1972 album Who Will Save The World? The Mighty Groundhogs!
