= Everyone (Skins series 1) =

- Skins episode
- L-R Maxxie, Anwar, Jal and Chris at Anwar's party
- Episode no.: Series 1 Episode 9
- Directed by: Adam Smith
- Written by: Bryan Elsley
- Original air date: 22 March 2007

Guest appearances
- Kaya Scodelario as Effy Stonem; Siwan Morris as Angie; Alastair Cumming as Merv; Nish Nathwani as Uncle Muneer; Inder Manocha as Istiak Kharral; Nina Wadia as Bibi Kharral

Episode chronology
← Previous "Effy"	Next → "Tony and Maxxie"
- Skins (series 1)

"Everyone" is the ninth and final episode of the first series of the British teen drama Skins. It was written by Bryan Elsley and directed by Adam Smith. It first aired on E4 in the UK on 22 March 2007. Unlike the season's other episodes, it does not focus particularly on one character but on the group as a whole, a first for the show.

== Plot ==
On Anwar's 17th birthday, he receives a phone call from Maxxie, who wishes him a happy birthday. Anwar invites Maxxie to his birthday party, but Maxxie says he will only go if Anwar tells his strict Muslim parents that Maxxie is gay. Meanwhile, Tony watches Effy head off to her new independent school following her overdose. (Note: As depicted in "Effy".) Chris discovers that Angie has a fiancé, who has recently returned to Bristol. After failing to write a love letter, Sid leaves to visit Cassie at her rehab clinic. However, his unkempt appearance causes him to be locked in a padded cell. At the same time, Cassie writes Sid a letter stating that she is moving to Elgin that night and leaves the hospital with her bulimic friend. Michelle asks Effy why she does not speak and why Tony hurt her, but she stays silent. Later that day, Chris breaks into Angie's house and, after finding photos of her and Merve, steals her engagement ring. Chris is caught by Angie and Merve, and he taunts Merve by saying he is closeted.

Anwar's uncle is DJing for the birthday party; unimpressed with the tacky disco music, Anwar complains. His father initially tells him his uncle should DJ because he has a proper ear for music; however, once out of earshot of Anwar's mother, he confesses his disdain for Anwar's uncle and notes that he cannot grope women while DJing. Anwar is then seduced by one of his sister's friends. He begins kissing her, but leaves to gossip to Maxxie, who is waiting outside. While Anwar is begging Maxxie to come inside, his father comes outside, and the two boys reveal that Maxxie is gay. Anwar's father states that he will not discriminate against homosexuality, as he has faith that God will one day enlighten him and make him understand, and invites Maxxie inside.

Tony and Effy rescue Sid from the hospital and take him to find Cassie, assuming she will be at Anwar's birthday party, and Effy insults Tony for hurting Michelle. Sid arrives at the party at the same time as Merve, who demands his ring back from Chris. Chris gives the ring to Angie, who gives it back to Merve, turning down his proposal, but also breaking up with Chris. A fight breaks out in the club between Chris' friends and Merve and his henchmen.

Tony finds Cassie outside and gives her Sid's love letter. He then tries to call Michelle, who is crying in the bathroom. Struggling to find a good connection, Tony walks out onto the road and is hit by a bus, directly in front of Effy. Before being hit, he leaves a voicemail on Michelle's phone, proclaiming his love for her. The cast breaks out into a rendition of Cat Stevens' "Wild World", led by Sid, who leaves the club to find Cassie and meets her by her favourite spot in the city, where she tried to commit suicide.

== Cast ==
- Nicholas Hoult as Tony Stonem
- Joe Dempsie as Chris Miles
- Mike Bailey as Sid Jenkins
- Hannah Murray as Cassie Ainsworth
- April Pearson as Michelle Richardson
- Larissa Wilson as Jal Fazer
- Dev Patel as Anwar Kharral
- Mitch Hewer as Maxxie Oliver

== Soundtrack ==
- "I've Been So Lonely for So Long" by Frederick Knight
- "You Can't Hurry Love" by The Concretes
- "The Owls Go" by Architecture in Helsinki
- "Sky Holds the Sun" by The Bees
- "Or Just Rearrange" by Micah P. Hinson
- "Happy Birthday" by Altered Images
- "Life is Life" by Opus
- "Bat Out of Hell" by Meat Loaf
- "It's All Over" by The Broken Family Band
- "Everything Changes" by Take That
- "I Don't Want to Miss a Thing" by Aerosmith
- "Give a Little Bit" by Supertramp
- "We Built This City" by Starship
- "Final Countdown" by Europe
- "Pow (Forward)" by Lethal Bizzle
- "True Love Ways" by Buddy Holly
- "Wild World" by Mike Bailey, Nicholas Hoult, Siwan Morris and Joe Dempsie
