= Adam Smith (director) =

English director

- Occupation: Director
- Years active: 1990–present

Adam Smith is an English film, television drama, documentary, and music video director. His filmmaking journey began as a teenager, making visuals for raves and nightclubs in a creative collective, which he co-founded, called Vegetable Vision.

Smith started his television directing career in 2007, with four episodes of the television series Skins. He then went on to directing episodes of the BBC One drama Little Dorrit, based on Charles Dickens' novel.^{[1]} In 2010, he directed the first episode of the revival fifth series of Doctor Who, 'The Eleventh Hour' and episodes four and five titled 'The Time of Angels' and 'Flesh and Stone'. For his work directing Doctor Who, he was voted best director by readers of Doctor Who Magazine.

Smith has worked closely with The Chemical Brothers since their first gig in 1994, designing the surreal and visionary video elements of their live shows. His music video for their song ‘Galvanise’ won the Grand Jury Prize Award for Best Music Video at Resfest 2005. In 2012 Smith directed the Chemical Brothers concert film ‘Don’t Think’, for which he was interviewed by Rolling Stone. The film won Best Live Film at the Music Video Awards 2012. Empire Magazine gave the film 5 stars saying, "This visceral ride captures the hands-aloft essence of live dance".

In 2015, Adam and creative partner Marcus Lyall creatively directed The Chemical Brothers’ ‘Born In The Echoes’ world tour, which included headline sets at Glastonbury, Primavera, and Sonar Festivals. Adam and Marcus created visuals combining props, films, animation and lighting. The tour was described by The Guardian as "an all-round aesthetic explosion and gargantuan visual show". Adam also filled in for Ed Simons on the tour operating music; lights and visuals live from the stage. The show was described by The Telegraph as "simply mesmerising". FACT Magazine praised their Glastonbury Festival headline set "the most impressive of the weekend", with Mixmag referring to it as a "must see". Digital Spy stated that "The duo's live offering has been refreshed by Smith's immersive visuals. The final result was a thrilling, powerful and enraptured stage show that breathed even more life into The Chemical Brothers' biggest bangers." In July 2015, Nowness featured a selection of the tour visuals alongside an interview with Smith.

Smith has also collaborated extensively with Mike Skinner of The Streets. His banned from TV, video for ‘Blinded by the Light’ won the DMA Best Video in 2004 and was nominated for the D&AD Silver Pencil in 2005. Smith’s comedy musical/extended music video ‘What Goes Up Must Come Down’ starring Charlie Creed Miles (and featuring a cameo from Kathy Burke) won the Golden Falcon Award at Ibiza Film Festival 2007.

He has made commercials for Nike (starring Wayne Rooney), The National Lottery, and The Children’s Society. His short film 'Desire' for the Jaguar F type launch starred Damian Lewis and Shannyn Sossamon, and premiered at Sundance London 2013. Documentaries for Channel 4 include an early portrait of the Grime music scene ‘Wot Do U Call It?’ and ‘A.I.P.S’ which looked at a group of Englishmen who reenact the Vietnam war in Kent. ’Ghetto on Sea’ for BBC THREE charted the trials and tribulations of running a pirate radio station.

In 2016 Adam completed his first feature, Trespass Against Us, starring Michael Fassbender, Sean Harris and Brendan Gleeson.

He lives with the artist Martha Freud, the granddaughter of Clement Freud and the great-great-granddaughter of Sigmund Freud. They have children.

== Filmography ==
- Skins
  - "Jal" (2007)
  - "Chris" (2007)
  - "Effy" (2007)
  - "Everyone" (2007)
- Little Dorrit
  - Episode 6 (2008)
  - Episode 7 (2008)
  - Episode 8 (2008)
  - Episode 9 (2008)
  - Episode 10 (2008)
  - Episode 11 (2008)
- Doctor Who
  - "The Eleventh Hour" (2010)
  - "The Time of Angels" (2010)
  - "Flesh and Stone" (2010)
- Don't Think (2012)
- Trespass Against Us (2016)
