= Skins series 2 =

2nd series of the British television show Skins

Skins
- Season 2
- DVD cover art for the second series of Skins
- Starring: Mike Bailey; Joe Dempsie; Aimee-Ffion Edwards; Mitch Hewer; Nicholas Hoult; Hannah Murray; Dev Patel; April Pearson; Larissa Wilson
- No. of episodes: 10

Release
- Original network: E4
- Original release: 11 February – 14 April 2008

Season chronology
- ← Previous; Series 1 Next → Series 3

Skins is a British teen drama created by father-and-son television writers Bryan Elsley and Jamie Brittain for Company Pictures. The second series began airing on E4 on 11 February 2008 and ended on 14 April 2008. Like the previous series, this series follows the lives of the first generation, which consists of Tony Stonem, Michelle Richardson, Sid Jenkins, Cassie Ainsworth, Chris Miles, Jal Fazer, Maxxie Oliver and Anwar Kharral.

== Main cast ==
Actor	Role	Episodes
Nicholas Hoult	Tony Stonem	All
April Pearson	Michelle Richardson	All
Mike Bailey	Sid Jenkins	All
Hannah Murray	Cassie Ainsworth	9
Joseph Dempsie	Chris Miles	9
Larissa Wilson	Jal Fazer	9
Mitch Hewer	Maxxie Oliver	9
Dev Patel	Anwar Kharral	9
Kaya Scodelario	Effy Stonem	9
Aimee-Ffion Edwards	Lucy Sketch	6

== List of episodes ==
No. overall	No. in series	Title	Featured character(s)	Directed by	Written by	Original release date	UK viewers (millions)
10	1	"Tony and Maxxie"	Tony Stonem and Maxxie Oliver	Aysha Rafaele	Bryan Elsley	11 February 2008	1.06
Six months on, Tony is still recovering from injuries sustained in the last series. He suffers from subdural hematoma leading to learning difficulties, amnesia, a lack of fine motor skills and personality changes. His mother slips into depression while his father struggles to control his frustration with the change in family dynamic. Sid cannot bear to see Tony in his condition, and Cassie moves up to Scotland. Effy steps up to take care of Tony. Maxxie is confronted by homophobic youths on his estate and by his father, who is keen for him to stay in college rather than become a dancer. The gang attend a rave, during which Tony has a panic attack and runs out. Maxxie runs out to look for him but is ambushed by the homophobes, one of which catches Maxxie and wrestles him to the ground and tries to kiss him. Maxxie succumbs and the two make out. Tony finds Michelle and Sid talking about him and assures them he will regain his lost memories.
11	2	"Sketch"	Lucy Sketch	Aysha Rafaele	Jack Thorne	18 February 2008	0.757
Sketch is a young carer for her disabled mother and is obsessed with Maxxie. Her schemes to make him fall in love with her endanger the college's production of "Osama: The Musical" and lead her to lie about the drama teacher molesting her to get a role in the play. Sketch befriends Michelle after seeing her fail to seduce a hesitant Tony, who suffers from erectile dysfunction following his injury. Sketch drugs Michelle to take her part in the play as Maxxie's love interest. The two kiss on stage as written, but Maxxie tells Sketch that he felt nothing. She slaps him and bursts into tears on stage. That night, she has sex with his best friend Anwar. Note: This episode marks the first appearance of Sketch. Cassie is absent from this episode.
12	3	"Sid"	Sid Jenkins	Simon Massey	Bryan Elsley	25 February 2008	0.767
Sid is in despair. Tony is a shadow of his former self and Cassie has settled down in Scotland. Sid and his father, Mark, are visited by Mark's father, brother, and nephews, who constantly belittle Mark and Sid. Mark persuades Sid’s mother to move back home for a day and pretend as though they were not separated. Sid breaks up with Cassie over a misunderstanding. Mark finally takes a stand against his father and brother and orders them to leave. He regrets being cruel to Sid, realizing that's how his father always treated him. He dies of an apparent heart attack that night and Sid discovers his body the next morning. Sid can't come to terms with it and leaves him where he's sitting, telling no one. Tony approaches him, saying people told him they were best friends. They attend a Crystal Castles gig where Sid opens up to Tony about his problems. Tony and Sid go back to Sid's house where Mark's body is still in the chair. Sid asks if this (his father's death and his breakup) is real. Sid calls his mother, then he boards a train.
13	4	"Michelle"	Michelle Richardson	Simon Massey	Sally Tatchell	3 March 2008	0.742
Everyone except Tony goes camping for Michelle's birthday, along with Michelle's new step-sister. After an emotional conversation with Sid about the death of his father, Michelle has sex with him on the beach out of sight of the rest of the group. Later, she opens her only present from the group, a watch from Tony with a note inside that reads "you wanted some time, happy birthday". Anwar meets with Sketch near the campsite, but Maxxie and Michelle catch them having sex. The group grudgingly approves of their relationship. Michelle and Sid go back to his bedroom, as a couple, to have sex again. But Cassie is sitting on Sid's bed, awaiting his return and catches him with Michelle.
14	5	"Chris"	Chris Miles	Harry Enfield	Ben Schiffer	10 March 2008	0.709
Chris is expelled from college and seeks advice from Jal. The two make a pact: Chris has to start looking for a career while Jal has to say "yes" to anything Chris suggests to get her into trying new things. Tony is relearning how to swim. After a string of failed jobs, Chris becomes an estate agent. Chris and Jal get together as a couple following the success of their pact. They squat in a flat that Chris's estate agency was supposed to sell. Cassie also moves in. Cassie lies to Chris telling him Jal left him. Angie comes into Chris's workplace to buy a house. Chris cheats on Jal with her. Chris and Jal split up. Chris loses his job when his boss discovers him and his friends in the flat. Jal discovers she is pregnant. Chris explains his loneliness to Jal and how she turned his life around and they get back together. Chris moves into Angie's old house.
15	6	"Tony"	Tony Stonem	Harry Enfield	Jamie Brittain	17 March 2008	0.751
At a nightclub, Michelle and Sid reveal they are a couple. Cassie states Tony should be with Michelle in an attempt to get with Sid. Tony laughs off the idea. Tony takes ecstasy and elements of his old personality surface. He confronts Sid and Michelle about their relationship before vomiting in the toilets. He meets a girl (Janet Montgomery) whom he later sees at a university open day. She is provocative and outspoken, helping Tony overcome his erectile dysfunction. She gets a tattoo and they then have sex in a dormitory. Afterward, Tony goes to the nightclub again and interrupts Sid and Michelle having sex in a toilet. He tells them their relationship is wrong and leaves. Both Sid and Michelle have doubts about their relationship. Note: Sketch is largely absent from this episode.
16	7	"Effy"	Effy Stonem	Simon Massey	Lucy Kirkwood	24 March 2008	0.686
With her father away on a work trip and her mother suffering from depression, Effy becomes the responsible adult in the Stonem household. Tony is coming to terms with his personality. At Effy’s private school she is tasked with completing her art coursework and mentoring the new girl, Pandora Moon. They become friends. Sid and Michelle break up. Sid wants to get back with Cassie but she has resorted to promiscuity. Sid does Effy’s art coursework in exchange for Effy getting them back together. Revealing his inner emotions, Sid completes the coursework. Effy buys cannabis and sells it at a nightclub with Pandora and Tony. They find Jake who is tasked with seducing Cassie. He goes round hers and they kiss, Effy photographs this and posts the pictures around Sid. He confronts Cassie and the two argue. Sid states she was not there for him when his dad died. He confesses he always loved her and they get back together. Michelle tells Tony she loves him. Note: This episode marks the first appearance of Pandora. Jal, Anwar, Maxxie and Sketch are absent from this episode.
17	8	"Jal"	Jal Fazer	Simon Massey	Daniel Kaluuya	31 March 2008	0.686
Jal attempts to tell Chris she is pregnant but considers having an abortion. Examinations are approaching. Jal’s father wants Jal to concentrate on exams and dump Chris. Meanwhile Chris has rented a house with Cassie, and wants Jal to move in. Michelle is embroiled in Spanish revision so Jal tells her she is pregnant in Spanish. Michelle does not understand and instead walks off with Tony. Jal tells her family she is pregnant. Her father demands she acts quickly. Jal’s mother makes a surprise return to instruct Jal to have an abortion. Cassie finds out Jal is pregnant and suggests she tells Chris. Jal attends her music audition. She goes to Chris’s house to confess her pregnancy but Cassie is there and informs Jal that Chris has been rushed to hospital. The nurse tells Jal that Chris is going into surgery because there is a blood clot on his brain, and that his brother had died of the same thing.
18	9	"Cassie"	Cassie Ainsworth	Charles Martin	Bryan Elsley	7 April 2008	0.766
Chris is discharged from hospital and is recovering, and Cassie sits her philosophy exam. Sid cooks a meal for Cassie to celebrate the end of her exams and invites Tony, Michelle and Jal. Tension between Michelle and Cassie lead to Michelle accidentally revealing that Jal is pregnant, which leaves Chris distraught. Chris's mother appears at the entrance of the flat but is unable to approach Chris to say hello. Cassie overhears Chris crying in his bedroom, and he later becomes ill again, forgets Jal’s name and has a blood pressure build up on the membrane, dying in Cassie’s arms. Distraught, Cassie flees to New York, homeless, penniless and mentally unstable. She is taken in by a kind waiter from Iowa, named Adam, with whom she develops a platonic friendship. Cassie stays a night at Adam's apartment, and wakes up to find a note saying that he'd be gone away for a while. This leaves Cassie distraught and the episode ends with Cassie running through the streets of New York. Note: This episode marks the final appearance of Chris. Sketch is absent from this episode.
19	10	"Final Goodbyes"	Everyone	Charles Martin	Jack Thorne	14 April 2008	0.766
It is A-Level results day and the day of Chris’s funeral. The gang decide to open the results after the funeral. Chris’s father visits Sid to tell him they aren't invited to the funeral. Sid and Tony steal Chris's coffin in an attempt to hold their own funeral, but are convinced to return it by Jal. Jal tells Michelle she got an abortion. The gang converge on a hilltop overlooking the graveyard and Jal makes an emotional speech, likening Chris to Captain Joe Kittinger. They read out their results to each other that night. Maxxie and his new boyfriend leave for London and take Anwar with them leaving a devastated Sketch. Tony and Michelle decide to stay together for university. Tony buys Sid tickets to New York where he goes to find Cassie. He is last shown outside the diner where Cassie works, their backs turned to each other, unaware of each other. The series finishes with Effy in Tony's bed smiling up into the camera. Note: This episode marks the final appearances of Tony, Sid, Jal, Michelle, Maxxie, Anwar and Sketch.
