= Maxxie and Anwar =

- Skins episode
- Maxxie and Anwar on the class-trip to Russia
- Episode no.: Season 1 Episode 6
- Directed by: Chris Clough
- Written by: Simon Amstell; Ben Schiffer
- Original air date: 1 March 2007

Guest appearances
- Siwan Morris as Angie; Robert Wilfort as Tom; Daniel Kaluuya as Posh Kenneth; Tessa Bell-Briggs as Mrs Rynkowski; Olga Fedori as Anka; Peter Silverleaf as Serge

Episode chronology
← Previous "Sid"	Next → "Michelle"
- Skins (series 1)

"Maxxie and Anwar" is the sixth episode of the first series of the British teen drama Skins. It was written by Simon Amstell and Ben Schiffer and was directed by Chris Clough. It first aired on E4 on 1 March 2007. It is told from the points of view of main characters Maxxie Oliver and Anwar Kharral.

== Plot synopsis ==
Tony, Michelle, Jal, Sid, Chris, Maxxie, Anwar, and the rest of their history class take a field trip to Russia. After several mishaps, they arrive at the dilapidated youth centre. In their room, Anwar looks through Maxxie's drawings of them, but is shocked to find that Maxxie has drawn his penis. After Anwar makes a homophobic remark, Maxxie storms off to Tony and Sid's room. Tony begins flirting with Maxxie, offering to perform fellatio on him. Meanwhile, Anwar sees a Russian girl outside a nearby house and calls the others. However, once they arrive, she is not there, causing them to believe that Anwar lied. That night, Chris visits Angie's room to say goodnight, but is forced to hide under the bed when Tom suddenly enters. After Tom falls asleep, Chris kisses Angie and leaves. Anwar again sees the Russian girl, in her underwear, through her bedroom window. She sees him and waves.

The next morning, Maxxie again argues with Anwar, accusing him of hypocrisy for being a hedonist despite being Muslim. While having a breakdown, Maxxie accidentally kicks a door open and finds Chris and Angie having sex. The center's owner, Mrs. Rynkowski, scolds Maxxie but invites him to listen to Neil Diamond in her room after noticing that he is upset. Anwar and Sid see the Russian girl being berated by an older man they assume to be her father and decide to rescue her. Jaz and Michelle decide to go out to a small tavern to meet Russian men, where they are flirted with by policemen. Anwar and Sid reach the Russian girl's house and smuggle her out. She reveals her name is Anka, and they go to the centre. Sid is caught by the older man and is chased into the woods. At the centre, Anwar learns that Anka speaks proficient English, and she persuades him to have sex with her. Tony sees them and tells everyone else.

Sid returns, followed by the man, whom Anka reveals is actually her husband. Upon learning that they were having sex, Anka's husband aims his shotgun at Anwar, but he is saved by Maxxie. Jal and Michelle return with the policemen, who arrest Anka's husband. The class is then ordered to leave the next morning. Maxxie and Anwar attempt to make amends, but Anwar insists that he cannot accept Maxxie's sexuality because of his religion. After Anwar leaves, Tony again offers to perform fellatio. Maxxie allows him to, and unbeknownst to either, Michelle, who was passed out on Tony's bed, watches the act. After finishing, Maxxie tells Tony that he has finally found something he isn't good at and leaves.

The next morning on the plane, Michelle tries to get Tony to confess to having oral sex with Maxxie, but he doesn't. Back in Russia, it is revealed that the local police, Mrs. Rynkowski, Anka, and her husband were all working together as part of a scheme to swindle the English tourists. Later, Anka kisses a drawing of Anwar.

== Cast ==
- Mitch Hewer as Maxxie Oliver
- Dev Patel as Anwar Kharral
- Nicholas Hoult as Tony Stonem
- Mike Bailey as Sid Jenkins
- April Pearson as Michelle Richardson
- Larissa Wilson as Jal Fazer
- Joe Dempsie as Chris Miles
- Siwan Morris as Angie

== Arc significance and continuity ==
=== Anwar and Maxxie's home lives ===
- Anwar's parents are Pakistani. It remains unknown if Anwar is a British citizen by birth or if he emigrated to England from Pakistan.
- Anwar's mother packs his suitcase, and obviously views him as a child still (bad mood comfy jim-jams).

=== Series relevance ===
- Tony continues to push the boundaries of manipulating people by hurting both Maxxie and Michelle. Tony's cheating on Michelle with Maxxie leads to their breakup in Michelle's episode.
- Cassie does not feature in this episode, the only episode of season one which she does not appear in. This is due to being rehabilitated after attempting suicide.
- Anwar and Maxxie's friendship is abruptly ended due to Anwar's inability to accept Maxxie's open homosexuality.
- Jal tries to tell Michelle about Abigail, but Michelle doesn't want to hear it.
- Chris and Angie have sex together.
- This is the first episode told from multiple points of view. Usually when characters share episodes, their character is developed further later in the series. However, Anwar does not have a central episode at all in the next series, while Maxxie shares one with Tony.

== Soundtrack ==
- "Easy Muffin" by Amon Tobin
- "Undenied" by Portishead
- "The Crane Wife 3" by The Decemberists
- "Gadje Sirba" by A Hawk and a Hacksaw
- "Get Your Snack On" by Amon Tobin
- "Broken Boy Soldiers" by The Raconteurs
- "Hello Again" by Neil Diamond
- "Positive Tension" by Bloc Party
- "Man of God" by Neil Diamond
- "The Sparrow" by A Hawk and a Hacksaw
- "There is a River in Galisteo" by A Hawk and a Hacksaw
