= Sid (Skins series 1) =

- Skins episode
- Sid and his father Mark in Sid's college
- Episode no.: Season 1 Episode 5
- Directed by: Minkie Spiro
- Written by: Jamie Brittain
- Original air date: 22 February 2007

Guest appearances
- Peter Capaldi as Mark Jenkins; Josie Lawrence as Liz Jenkins; Georgina Moffat as Abigail Stock; Robert Wilfort as Tom

Episode chronology
← Previous "Chris"	Next → "Maxxie and Anwar"
- Skins (series 1)

"Sid" is the fifth episode of the first series of the British teen drama Skins. It was written by Jamie Brittain and directed by Minkie Spiro. It aired on E4 on 22 February 2007. It is told from the point of view of main character Sid Jenkins.

== Plot synopsis ==
Sid and his parents, Liz and Mark, discuss his failing grade in A-Level history with his teacher, Tom, who grants Sid a 48-hour extension to rewrite his paper. Frustrated with Sid's lack of motivation, Mark grounds him to work on the paper. Despite being told to return home directly after school, Sid instead goes to College Green with Maxxie and Anwar. Sid tells Cassie that he is unable to go on their date because he is grounded, and Cassie replies that she may visit his house.

Meanwhile, Tony invites Michelle and Sid to his concert with the City Chamber Choir that evening. Hoping to see Michelle, Sid sneaks out of the house to attend the concert. At the concert, Tony and Abigail share a passionate scripted kiss, upsetting Michelle. Michelle and Sid go backstage, where they find Tony with his hand up Abigail's shirt. After Michelle storms out, Tony tells Sid that he purposefully did it so Sid can get with Michelle. Sid goes after Michelle, who is attacked by a gang of chav girls. Michelle accuses Sid of knowing Tony's plan and slaps him, and Sid is then attacked by the girls.

Sid returns home bruised. Although Liz tries to comfort him, Mark chastises him. He angrily enters his room and finds Cassie, who is hurt that Sid met up with Michelle instead of her. She kisses Sid and leaves, telling Sid that everything is his choice. While being dropped off at school, Liz is unable to bring herself to tell Sid a secret, instead telling him to reconcile with Mark. After not seeing Michelle in class, Sid arranges to meet her at a club. Cassie overhears the conversation and is distraught.

At the club, Michelle apologizes to Sid and the two dance. Tony suddenly arrives and dances with Michelle. Sid tries to leave, but is held back by Tony, forcing Sid to watch him dance with Michelle. Meanwhile, Cassie attempts suicide via overdose on a park bench. Sid rings Cassie's mobile but gets through to Jal, who is riding in the ambulance with her. Sid goes to the hospital, but an angry Jal tells him to leave, blaming him.

Sid returns home to Mark, solemn and brooding. Mark tells Sid that Liz has abandoned the family, and Sid angrily demands that he bring Liz home before going to his room. Sid sits at his computer and, after ignoring a call from Tony, finishes his history paper overnight.

== Acting ==
=== Main cast ===
- Mike Bailey as Sid Jenkins
- Hannah Murray as Cassie Ainsworth
- April Pearson as Michelle Richardson
- Nicholas Hoult as Tony Stonem
- Larissa Wilson as Jal Fazer
- Joe Dempsie as Chris Miles
- Mitch Hewer as Maxxie Oliver
- Dev Patel as Anwar Kharral

== Arc significance and continuity ==
=== Sid's homelife ===
- In this episode, Sid's parents separate on account of his father's constant bad mood and general attitude and behaviour.
- Mark is portrayed as an ill-tempered cretin who constantly bickers with his family and is often disappointed because of Sid's lack of academic ability.
- Even within Sid's own home, he is living under Tony's shadow. His parents are impressed with and admiring of Tony's intelligence and good looks.

=== Series relevance ===
- Tony's manipulative streak increases into cruel mind games as Tony lures Sid into false hope only to dash it, and also purposely hurts Michelle in order to win her back.
- Sid is seen to be failing his history A-Levels.
- Cassie tries to kill herself and is readmitted into her clinic for depression and self-destructive behaviour.
- Michelle begins to suspect Tony's infidelity with Abigail.

== Soundtrack ==
- "Grunge Betty" by The Dandy Warhols
- "Underwear" by The Magnetic Fields
- "Date with the Night" by the Yeah Yeah Yeahs
- "God Only Knows" by Nicholas Hoult, Georgina Moffat and the Bristol City Chamber Choir
- "Little David (Play on Your Harp)" by Bristol City Chamber Choir
- "Total Eclipse of the Heart" by Georgina Moffat
- "Main Offender" by The Hives
- "Old Fashioned Morphine" by Jolie Holland
- "This Is My Beginning" by Floxit
- "Be Cool Be Nice" by St. Thomas
- "You Look Great When I'm High" by The Brian Jonestown Massacre
- "Hell is Round the Corner" by Tricky
