= Jal (Skins series 1) =

- Skins episode
- Jal playing at the Young Musician of the Year Competition
- Episode no.: Series 1 Episode 3
- Directed by: Adam Smith
- Written by: Bryan Elsley
- Original air date: 8 February 2007

Guest appearances
- Mark Monero as Ronny Fazer; Troy Glasgow as Ace Fazer; Brian Fergus Fuller as Lynton Fazer; Stephen Martin Walters as Madison Twatter; Pooky Quesnel as Claire; Giles Thomas as Doug; Kaya Scodelario as Effy Stonem; Georgina Moffat as Abigail Stock

Episode chronology
← Previous "Cassie"	Next → "Chris"
- Skins (series 1)

"Jal" is the third episode of the first series of the British teen drama Skins. It was written by Bryan Elsley and directed by Adam Smith. It premiered on E4 on 8 February 2007. It is told from the point of view of main character Jal Fazer.

== Plot ==
While preparing for the Young Musician of the Year final, Jal is called into the college director's office, who asks her to tell the BBC how the college helped her succeed despite her disadvantaged background. Jal, who comes from a wealthy family, believes the request to be racist. Afterward, she goes to Tony's house to retrieve Michelle, as she is to help Jal shop for a dress. As Michelle is busy with Tony, Jal instead takes Sid with her. While shopping, she reveals to Sid that she knows he has a crush on Michelle. At home, Jal attempts to practise the clarinet for the finals, but is unable on account of her brothers Ace and Lynton's loud grime music

She complains to her father that she needs to practise, but Ronny Fazer, a successful grime singer himself, is uninterested. He tells her that her brothers and their English friend, Donny, need to practise as well. That night, Jal and Michelle watch Jal's interview and joke over her lack of cooperation. While preparing to go to Ronny's club that night, Michelle helps Jal pick a new dress. At the club, Michelle friend zones Sid. While dancing, Jal witnesses Tony snog Abigail.

Distraught, she joins Sid on the couch. They decide to go out drinking with a man that Jal has been chatting with, who turns out to be an associate of Mad Twatter. He leads them to a narrow alleyway, where Twatter robs Sid and smashes Jal's clarinet. Ace and Lynton intervene but are beaten by Twatter. Later that night, Jal argues with Ronny after hearing him rapping alone in his studio, saying it's not her fault she looks like her mother. Ronny tells Jal to clean her room, where she discovers that he has bought her a new clarinet.

While Jal performs at the competition, Ronny and his bodyguard kidnap Mad Twatter.

== Main cast ==
- Larissa Wilson as Jal Fazer
- Mike Bailey as Sid Jenkins
- April Pearson as Michelle Richardson
- Nicholas Hoult as Tony Stonem
- Joe Dempsie as Chris Miles
- Dev Patel as Anwar Kharral
- Hannah Murray as Cassie Ainsworth
- Mitch Hewer as Maxxie Oliver

== Soundtrack ==
- "Rhapsody in Blue" by George Gershwin
- "Clarinet Concerto (Allegro)" by Mozart
- "Arcane" by Arc
- "Soul Vibration" by J-Walk
- "Highest Grade Dub" by Roots Manuva
- "Breakthrough" by Isaac Hayes
- "I Get Lifted" by George McCrae
- "90% of Me is You" by Gwen McCrae
- "Original Nuttah" by UK Apachi and Shy FX
- "Prince Charming" by Adam and the Ants
