= Tony (Skins series 2) =

- Skins episode
- Tony has sex with the girl
- Episode no.: Season 2 Episode 6
- Directed by: Harry Enfield
- Written by: Jamie Brittain
- Original air date: 17 March 2008

Guest appearances
- Daniel Kaluuya as Posh Kenneth; Janet Montgomery as Beth; Duncan Barton as Derek; Mariah Gale as Polly; Jack West as Martin; Oliver Mellor as Matt; Nick Figgis as Toby; Chris Kiely as Nervous Looking Guy; Matthew Bloxham as Tom; Sean Pertwee as Soldier on the Train and Simon the Lecturer

Episode chronology
← Previous "Chris"	Next → "Effy"

"Tony" is the sixth episode of the second series of the British teen drama Skins, which first aired on 17 March 2008 on E4 in both Ireland and the United Kingdom. The episode was written by Jamie Brittain, and was directed by Harry Enfield.

The episode focuses on Tony (Nicholas Hoult). Since the accident, Tony lives isolated and alone in a world of half-understood dreams. He tries to act normal, but bumping into Sid (Mike Bailey) and Michelle (April Pearson) at a club sends him spiralling again.

The episode was filmed in November 2007.

== Plot ==
Tony is awoken by a nightmare and calls for Effy (Kaya Scodelario) to comfort him. She reads him a story about Orpheus and Eurydice.

Later, Tony visits the club where he meets with his friends. Cassie (Hannah Murray), Sid's ex-girlfriend, gives Tony some ecstasy and proposes that they go on a date to get back at Sid and Michelle. However, Tony reveals to Cassie that he was having trouble being intimate after his accident. Tony starts to confront Sid and Michelle manically, but runs off to vomit in the bathrooms. There, he meets a beautiful girl (credited as Beth) who notices that he is having a panic attack and asks him if he is a "fighter or flighter." Back in the club, Tony watches Sid watch Cassie kiss a stranger, and runs home.

The next day, Sid and Michelle visit Tony to try to make amends with him, who is hiding under his bed. He repeats that he is fine with their relationship and asks the two to leave because he has an interview at a university. On the train to his interview, Tony finds a man with a large scar in a uniform sitting in front of him. The man volunteers the story of how he set himself on fire and got the burns.

At the college, Polly and Derek, the eccentric campus tour guides, lead Tony and the other students around the school. Tony is late to the group session, where the lecturer, who bears an uncanny resemblance to the scarred man, is critical of Tony. Tony finds the girl from the club sitting three chairs away from him, who accuses the lecturer of trying to sleep with the college students. The girl leaves, followed by Tony. They walk around campus and the girl pushes him into the pool, despite his protests. She tells him to just float, which alleviates his fears. Later, Tony is found alone in the pool by Polly and Derek, who advise him not to follow the girl. Tony encounters the girl again on the tour, where she leads him into a lab full of fragile equipment and instructs him to walk across the room in the dark. Tony breaks the equipment, setting off an alarm, and the girl helps Tony run away by leading him to a dorm.

In the dorm, they find Matt and Toby, who encourage Tony to smoke with them. The four all undress to their underwear, and Matt reveals a large tattoo design on his back. The girl is intrigued and asks him to tattoo her as well. She invites Tony to touch her, and berates him for not being able to have sex, saying he isn't trying hard enough. Angry, Tony leaves the dorm and visits the lecturer for his interview, where the lecturer lists all of Tony's antics at the school. The lecturer taunts Tony for not being original, and Tony responds by crudely insulting him and telling him that he doesn't want to end up like him.

Tony returns to the dorm, where Matt and Toby congratulate him and leave. He has sex with the girl, and afterwards she affectionately tells him not to look back.

Back from the university, Tony goes to the club to find Sid and Michelle having sex in the bathroom. He proclaims that he loves both Sid and Michelle, but that it is wrong for them to be together because Sid loves Cassie, and Tony and Michelle love each other. Tony goes home and goes to bed, revealing the girl's tattoo on his back.

== Production ==
The scenes at the university were shot at the University of Exeter. Jamie Brittain, co-creator of the show, claims that this was his favorite episode to write: "I kept expecting someone to tell me to stop, to reign in the craziness, but no one did. I watched it fairly recently and I am very proud of how seriously f–king mental it is." Nicholas Hoult praises Harry Enfield's direction of the sex scene, saying, "it was quite nice. Harry's a great bloke. He had a great vision for the scene. He knew what he wanted."

== Reception ==
This episode was watched by 751,000 people in the UK.
