= Skins series 1 =

1st series of the British television show Skins

Skins
- Season 1
- DVD cover art for the first series of Skins
- Starring: Mike Bailey; Joe Dempsie; Mitch Hewer; Nicholas Hoult; Hannah Murray; Dev Patel; April Pearson; Larissa Wilson
- No. of episodes: 9

Release
- Original network: E4
- Original release: 25 January – 22 March 2007

Season chronology
- Next → Series 2

Skins is a British teen drama created by father-and-son television writers Bryan Elsley and Jamie Brittain for Company Pictures. The first series began airing on E4 on 25 January 2007 and ended on 22 March 2007. It follows the lives of the first generation of sixth form students Tony Stonem, Michelle Richardson, Sid Jenkins, Cassie Ainsworth, Chris Miles, Jal Fazer, Maxxie Oliver and Anwar Kharral.

== Cast ==
=== Main ===
| Actor | Role | Episodes |
|---|---|---|
| Nicholas Hoult | Tony Stonem | All |
| Joe Dempsie | Chris Miles | All |
| Mike Bailey | Sid Jenkins | All |
| Hannah Murray | Cassie Ainsworth | 8 |
| April Pearson | Michelle Richardson | All |
| Larissa Wilson | Jal Fazer | All |
| Dev Patel | Anwar Kharral | All |
| Mitch Hewer | Maxxie Oliver | 8 |

=== Recurring ===
- Siwan Morris as Angie (5 episodes and 3 uncredited appearances)
- Kaya Scodelario as Effy Stonem (4 episodes)
- Georgina Moffat as Abigail Stock (4 episodes)
- Daniel Kaluuya as Posh Kenneth (4 episodes)
- Stephen Walters as Mad Twatter (3 episodes)
- Robert Wilfort as Tom (3 episodes)
- Morwenna Banks as Anthea Stonem (2 episodes)
- Harry Enfield as Jim Stonem (2 episodes)
- Arabella Weir as Anna Richardson (2 episodes)
- Danny Dyer as Malcolm (2 episodes)
- Peter Capaldi as Mark Jenkins (2 episodes and 1 uncredited appearance)
- Ben Lloyd-Hughes as Josh Stock (2 episodes)
- Danielle Jadelyn as Water Bottle Girl (2 episodes)

=== Guest ===
- Victoria Wicks as College Director (1 episode)
- Giles Thomas as Doug (1 episode)

== Episodes ==
| No. overall | No. in series | Title | Featured character(s) | Directed by | Written by | Original release date | UK viewers (millions) |
|---|---|---|---|---|---|---|---|
| 1 | 1 | "Tony" | Tony Stonem | Paul Gay | Bryan Elsley | 25 January 2007 | 1.54 |
Tony makes plans for Sid to lose his virginity to Cassie at posh girl Abigail's party. However, Sid ends up buying 3 ounces of drugs instead of 1, which they must somehow pay back. Maxxie takes Anwar and Chris on a "gay night out" for them to find desperate girls, but they all end up at Abigail's party. While there, Cassie overdoses on sleeping pills, and the group steals Abigail's mum's car to rush her to the hospital. She wakes up as they arrive, and the group accidentally crashes the car into the harbour along with the drugs. Note: This episode marks the first appearances of Tony, Chris, Sid, Cassie, Michelle, Jal, Anwar, Maxxie and Effy.
| 2 | 2 | "Cassie" | Cassie Ainsworth | Paul Gay | Bryan Elsley | 1 February 2007 | 0.977 |
The gang trashed Michelle's house at a wild party while her mom was out of town, but she unexpectedly returns. Cassie's parents are oblivious to her struggles, and she hides weights in her underwear in order to be released from the clinic she attends for her eating disorder. Sid expresses concern and Cassie is shocked that he cares, hallucinating that he is sending her text messages encouraging her to eat. The drug dealer Sid had blown off shows up as a fake substitute teacher for their class.
| 3 | 3 | "Jal" | Jal Fazer | Adam Smith | Bryan Elsley | 8 February 2007 | 0.91 |
Jal is a gifted clarinet player and has been selected by the school to compete for Young Musician of the Year, but her brothers and their music producer father don't take her seriously. Michelle and Tony are inseparable, which tortures Sid, who is in love with Michelle. Cassie has developed a crush on Sid, but he is oblivious. Jal's fame is exploited by the school, who try to feed her answers for her TV interview. At a party, Sid and Jal are attacked by the drug dealer who is pursuing Sid, but Jal's dad gets revenge.
| 4 | 4 | "Chris" | Chris Miles | Adam Smith | Jack Thorne | 15 February 2007 | 0.709 |
Chris wakes up to a note from his mother saying she's gone away for a few days and left him £1000, so he throws a massive party and uses up all of it. Chris realizes that his drug addicted mother likely isn't coming back. A squatter manages to take over his house, Chris walks to college naked to ask Angie for help. Out of desperation, Chris goes to his dad's house with Jal, but his father and new wife are displeased with his presence. Chris runs off to the cemetery and Jal follows, where he reveals he had an older brother who has passed. Angie manages to set Chris up in an old staff dorm room, but warns him that he is liable for any damages and could be kicked out of college. Tony and Michelle openly taunt Sid for his crush on Michelle. Cassie asks Sid on a date and he agrees absentmindedly.
| 5 | 5 | "Sid" | Sid Jenkins | Minkie Spiro | Jamie Brittain | 22 February 2007 | 0.889 |
Sid is failing his classes and given one final chance to pass. Cassie reminds him of their date, and says she'll come to his house when he replies that he's grounded. Tony insists Sid and Michelle come to his choir concert, where he makes a show of kissing Abigail on stage. Michelle is distraught, but Tony tells Sid this is a gift to him, as it is his chance to get with her as a rebound. However, when Sid and Michelle are later slow dancing at a bar, Tony swoops in to take her back and forces Sid to watch. Sid comes home to find Cassie who, upon realizing he was with Michelle, attempts suicide. Sid's mother leaves them, and he finally stands up to his dad.
| 6 | 6 | "Maxxie and Anwar" | Maxxie Oliver and Anwar Kharral | Chris Clough | Simon Amstell & Ben Schiffer | 1 March 2007 | 0.808 |
The group goes on a field trip to Russia. Tony forces Sid to hide drugs in his anus on the plane, but he is constipated once they arrive, rendering the drugs inaccessible. Anwar makes a disparaging comment about Maxxie's sexuality and they have a falling out. Maxxie points out Anwar's hypocrisy in drinking and having premarital sex as a Muslim, but not accepting homosexuality. Maxxie switches his room to share with Tony, who then tries to seduce him. Michelle witnesses this and is distraught at Tony's constant infidelity. Chris and Angie have sex. Anwar is entranced by a Russian girl next door, who takes his virginity. Note: Cassie is absent from this episode.
| 7 | 7 | "Michelle" | Michelle Richardson | Minkie Spiro | Bryan Elsley | 8 March 2007 | 0.799 |
Michelle breaks up with Tony, but he assumes they will get back together like they always do. Angie finds Michelle drinking in a closet and comforts her. Chris walks in on them, and they have sex after driving Michelle home. Michelle accompanies Sid to see Cassie as he asks her for a second chance. The clinic is run by Abigail's family, and her brother Josh has a meet-cute with Michelle. They hit it off and begin seeing each other, but Tony sabotages it by stealing Josh's phone and planting nude pictures of Abigail. Assuming Josh is a pervert, Michelle calls it off.
| 8 | 8 | "Effy" | Effy Stonem | Adam Smith | Jack Thorne | 15 March 2007 | 0.756 |
All of the group is ignoring Tony, having taken Michelle's side in the breakup. His younger sister Effy sneaks out again and attends a party where she is arrested. The police department calls Tony, but when he arrives, they tell him she has already been picked up. He recruits Sid to help look for her, and they get a mysterious call implying that Effy has been kidnapped. Meanwhile she has been taken to a country club rave where she meets Josh, who injects her arm with unknown drugs. Tony ridicules Sid for being useless and reveals that he planted the pictures on Josh's phone. Fed up, Sid calls Tony sick and leaves. A masked motorcyclist arrives to take Tony to Effy. They arrive at the party and Tony is taunted by Josh, who shows him his unconscious sister and orders him to have sex with her in order to call an ambulance. However he eventually lets them go, having gotten his revenge by taunting Tony. Sid comes to pick them up, taking them to the hospital. Note: Maxxie is absent from this episode.
| 9 | 9 | "Everyone" | Everyone | Adam Smith | Bryan Elsley | 22 March 2007 | 0.797 |
Anwar's family is throwing him a birthday party, and Maxxie refuses to come unless his sexuality is revealed to Anwar's Muslim parents. Chris is at Angie's house when her alleged fiance shows up at the door and he is crushed. Effy is sent to private school after her incident. Cassie is being sent to Scotland and writes Sid a letter saying goodbye. She sneaks out of the clinic to deliver it, not knowing that Sid has gone to the clinic looking for her. Tony helps Sid look for Cassie, eventually ending up at Anwar's party. Maxxie arrives, and Anwar tells his dad that Maxxie is gay. His dad gives a heartfelt acceptance of Maxxie. Tony finds Cassie and gives her a letter that Sid wrote her, which he stole from Sid's desk. Tony then calls Michelle and declares his love for her sincerely, but before she can respond, he is hit by a bus.
