= Effy (Skins series 1) =

- Skins episode
- Effy after sneaking out with Julie
- Episode no.: Series 1 Episode 8
- Directed by: Adam Smith
- Written by: Jack Thorne
- Original air date: 15 March 2007

Guest appearances
- Ben Lloyd Hughes as Josh Stock; Tom Payne as Spencer; Stephanie Houtman as Julie; Daniel Kirrane as Kevin; Harry Enfield as Jim Stonem; Morwenna Banks as Anthea Stonem

Episode chronology
← Previous "Michelle"	Next → "Everyone"
- Skins series 1

"Effy" is the eighth and penultimate episode of the first series of the British teen drama Skins. It was written by Jack Thorne and directed by Adam Smith. It aired on E4 on 15 March 2007. It is told from the point of view of recurring character Effy Stonem and her brother, main character Tony Stonem.

== Plot ==
After a family game night goes awry, Effy sneaks out to party with her friend, Julie. Tony watches Effy leave and tries to call his friends, who all ignore his calls in favor of Michelle. Effy flirts with a boy named Spencer, sharing an ecstasy tablet with him. They are caught by the police and arrested. Tony goes to the jail to pick up Effy, but is told that her brother already bailed her out. Tony sees Effy getting into a van and chases after her, but is attacked by a group of masked men.

Tony obtains Sid's help with finding Effy, and they steal Sid's father's car. While driving around, Sid sees Cassie around the city several times. Meanwhile, Michelle and Jal walk around town and bump into Josh, who attempts to reconcile with her. However, Michelle orders him to leave her alone. Effy and her friends go to a party where she meets Josh. Josh calls Tony and reveals that he is with Effy, and gives Tony a meetup location. After, Josh roofies Effy.

As they wait at the meeting point, Tony admits to Sid that he manipulated Michelle to break up with Josh, and the two get into a brief fight. Sid gets into the car and abandons Tony. Shortly after, Tony is picked up by a stranger, who offers to bring him to Effy. Meanwhile, Sid calls Cassie, and they meet at a diner. Tony arrives at Josh's party and calls Michelle to tell her where he is, who tells Sid. Sid decides to look for Tony, causing Cassie to believe that he is leaving her again.

Tony enters the club and sees Josh and an unconscious Effy. Spencer breaks Tony's phone and offers to call an ambulance if Tony has sex with his unconscious sister. Tony refuses to, crying and pleading for Effy's life. Josh tells Tony that he only wanted to humiliate him as revenge for leaking Abigail's nudes to Michelle from his phone. Sid arrives and takes Effy to the hospital. At the hospital, it is revealed that Josh injected Effy with clean, pure pharmaceuticals. Jim and Anthea arrive and assume Tony supplied Effy with drugs. However, Sid defends Tony. Tony thanks Sid and tells him he is finished being self-centered and wishes to become a better person.

== Cast ==
- Kaya Scodelario as Effy Stonem
- Nicholas Hoult as Tony Stonem
- Mike Bailey as Sid Jenkins
- April Pearson as Michelle Richardson
- Hannah Murray as Cassie Ainsworth
- Joe Dempsie as Chris Miles
- Dev Patel as Anwar Kharral
- Larissa Wilson as Jal Fazer

== Soundtrack ==
- "Your Heart is So Loud" by Colleen
- "Keep Loving Me" by The Draytones
- "Knife" by Grizzly Bear
- "Reprise" by Grizzly Bear
- "Sheepdog" by Mando Diao
- "Lake of Roaches" by Wolf Eyes
- "Ancient Delay" by Wolf Eyes
- "Fully" by Gescom
- "Under Me Sensi" by Barrington Levy
- "Hammer Without a Master" by Broadcast
- "Angry" by Skream
- "Colourful" by Skream
- "Close Your Eyes" by Micah P. Hinson
- "Subbass" by Fat Segal
- "0800 Dub" by Skream
- "Interchangeable" World by Gescom
- "Burned Mind" by Wolf Eyes
- "For Lovers" by Wolfman ft. Pete Doherty
- "Black Vomit" by Wolf Eyes
- "Dragonfly" by M. Craft
