= Stonem =

Stonem may refer to one of two characters in the British teen drama Skins.

- Tony Stonem
- Effy Stonem
