= Tony (Skins series 1) =

- Skins episode
- L-R Sid, Tony, Michelle and Cassie at Abigail's party
- Episode no.: Series 1 Episode 1
- Directed by: Paul Gay
- Written by: Bryan Elsley
- Original air date: 25 January 2007

Guest appearances
- Harry Enfield as Jim Stonem; Morwenna Banks as Anthea Stonem; Siwan Morris as Angie the Psychology Teacher; Kaya Scodelario as Effy Stonem; Georgina Moffat as Abigail Stock

Episode chronology
← Previous —	Next → "Cassie"
- Skins series 1

"Tony" is the first episode of British drama television series Skins. It was written by Bryan Elsley and directed by Paul Gay. It is told from the point of view of main character Tony Stonem. It first aired on E4 on 25 January 2007 in the United Kingdom.

== Plot ==
The episode begins with Tony waking up in his room on an average morning. He distracts his angry, overly vocal father in order for his younger sister Effy to get inside unnoticed. Tony continues to irritate his father by locking him out of the bathroom and exiting through the window, leaving the door locked.

Tony then leaves for college and on the way rings his friends and tries to organise a night out so they can help his best friend Sid lose his virginity. Tony and Sid meet for breakfast in a café where Tony tells Sid that they will get a girl "spliffed up" so she will have sex with Sid. Michelle and Tony tell Sid he is being set up with Cassie, who was recently in a psychiatric hospital. Tony asks Sid to pick up some drugs off his dealer, Mad Twatter.

Tony auditions for the city chamber choir and succeeds in getting a part. He then flirts with a private school girl Abigail Stock and agrees to attend her house party with his friends. Most of his friends, however, have other plans. Tony's openly gay friend Maxxie is taking Chris and Anwar on a big, gay night out. Tony, now aware via Chris that Bristol has cannabis, tries to call Sid to tell him not to buy the drugs, but Sid has his mobile phone switched off. Mad bullies Sid into purchasing three ounces instead of the intended ounce. He then violently threatens Sid afterwards that he needs to pay the weed back with its profits.

The gang arrive at Abigail's party and Sid meets Cassie. In Abigail's house, they are told to remove their shoes and not to smoke. Tony and Michelle scoff at the dull, lifeless party the wealthy "posh" kids and decide to show them up with seductive dancing. Sid goes to find Cassie, and they discuss her anorexia, where she confesses she'd taken pills earlier which causes her to become unconscious. While they talk, Chris, Anwar and Maxxie arrive.

While Chris dirties the floor A fight breaks out after Tony punches a posh boy in the face. The fight is broken up as Sid runs in with an unconscious Cassie. The group, along with a posh Polish girl from the party, steal a Mercedes car and drive Cassie to the city hospital, where Cassie wakes. The gang then drive to the harbour. While parked, Sid accidentally hits the car's handbrake. The car rolls into the harbour, destroying the three ounces of weed. The group, minus Chris and the Polish girl, climb out of the submerged car and walk home. By the end of the episode Tony and Sid retire to Tony's bed.

== U.S. version ==
This episode is remade almost shot-for-shot for the U.S. adaption of Skins. Differences include

- The show's setting was changed from Bristol to an unnamed Eastern seaboard city.
- Tony's surname is changed to Snyder
- Chris's surname is changed to Collins
- Effy is renamed Eura
- Cassie is renamed Cadie
- Sid is renamed Stanley
- Abigail does not appear
- Maxxie is replaced by Tea Marvelli, an out lesbian
