= Tony Stonem =

Character in Skins

- Skins character
- Nicholas Hoult as Tony Stonem
- First appearance: "Tony" (2007)
- Last appearance: "Final Goodbyes" (2008)
- Created by: Bryan Elsley and Jamie Brittain
- Portrayed by: Nicholas Hoult
- Seasons: 1–2
- Centric episode(s): "Tony" (episode 1.01) "Tony and Maxxie" (episode 2.01) "Tony" (episode 2.06)

In-universe information
- Nickname: Tone
- Occupation: Student
- Family: Jim Stonem (father); Anthea Stonem (mother); Effy Stonem (sister); David Stonem (grandfather, deceased)
- Significant others: Michelle Richardson (girlfriend); Maxxie Oliver (sexual encounter)
- Nationality: British

Anthony Stonem is a fictional character from the British television series Skins. He is the protagonist of the first two series. Portrayed by Nicholas Hoult, the character was created by Bryan Elsley; Tony was the series' central character in its first and second series, from 2007 to 2008. The character is considered an antihero, as many of his actions are questionable and antagonistic due to his manipulative tendencies. However, this changes in the second series after he becomes a victim of a subdural haematoma, affecting his personality and memories. Hoult, along with the other starring actors of the first two series, departed the show after its second series. The character was subsequently alluded to in episodes of the third and fourth series, which centred on Tony's sister Effy, played by Kaya Scodelario. In the 2011 American adaptation of the show, Tony is played by actor James Newman, and the character's surname is changed to Schneider.

== Characterization ==
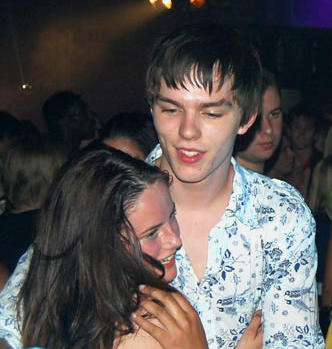
Hoult with Kaya Scodelario at the Skins Party in 2007.

Tony appears to be a very handsome, popular and academically gifted young man, with a typical English middle-class background. He plays cruel games with his family and friends, in particular those closest to him, his girlfriend Michelle (April Pearson) and best friend Sid (Mike Bailey). In "Sid", he displays his love for "control and manipulation" and fondness for the unpredictability of the universe, comparing the lives of those around to him to the functions of subatomic particles. In the Unseen Skins episode "The Cat & The Duck", Michelle characterises Tony as like ice, "cold and transparent."

Tony's sexual encounters are supposedly vast. In "Michelle", Jal Fazer (Larissa Wilson) is able to recall a long list of his conquests. Michelle later puts to Abigail Stock (Georgina Moffat) that he "fucks everyone... including boys." In "Maxxie & Anwar", Tony attempts an oral tryst with his gay friend Maxxie (Mitch Hewer). Tony does not specify a sexual orientation but he says to Maxxie that he simply wants "to try something new". In a psychology lesson, he equates sex with power and his lust for both is portrayed in his presentation. An aspect of his subconscious (portrayed as a college headmaster) refers to him as "polysexual", in series two's "Tony" episode. Bryan Elsley characterizes Tony's attempt to seduce Maxxie as an exploration of the character's sexual fluidity; in season one of the American adaptation, Maxxie's character is replaced by the character Tea (Sofia Black-D'Elia), and her sexual fluidity is substituted for Tony's. In the British series, Tony fits the older television and film archetype of the "narcissistic, controlling, and stereotypically sociopathic 'bad bisexual'".

Tony's reading habits give insight into his personality. In "Tony", the book he reads in the bathroom is La Nausée by Jean-Paul Sartre, a novel about existentialism and defining oneself. In "Sid", he is shown reading Friedrich Nietzsche's Thus Spoke Zarathustra, a book which challenges existing moral values. In "Maxxie and Anwar" he reads Jeanette Winterson's Oranges Are Not the Only Fruit, a book about a young girl struggling with her homosexuality. In the "Tony" episode of series 2, he is seen reading Ayn Rand's Atlas Shrugged, while sitting on the train.

== Character history ==
=== Series 1 ===
In the episode "Tony", he attempts to help his best friend Sid to lose his virginity before turning 17 for fear of being associated with a perceived loser. After momentarily suggesting Sid may lose it to Michelle, he later reveals he was referring to Cassie (Hannah Murray). He orders Sid to acquire some weed from local drug dealer Madison Twatter, and eventually ends up driving a stolen car with his friends into the harbour where the drugs are lost.

Tony also begins a flirtatious relationship with local rich girl Abigail, which develops in "Jal" when he is spotted kissing her by Jal, and later in "Sid" where he uses her to break up with Michelle, claiming that he is doing it for Sid, to give him an opportunity to pursue his crush, only to get back with her in an attempt to emotionally damage Sid and Michelle. In "Maxxie and Anwar", on a school trip to Russia he aggressively and persistently tries to perform oral sex on his gay friend Maxxie, only to find he is bad at it. Michelle witnesses this and is shocked, and believing he could be in the closet, probes him to reveal any secrets he may be carrying.

In "Michelle", the episode starts with Michelle watching him as he continues to behave flirtatiously around Maxxie. Enraged, Michelle walks over to, punches and subsequently dumps him after he fails to tell her about his encounter with Maxxie, and she learns of various other affairs. He is subsequently punched by Sid and later slapped by another girl in psychology lesson as punishment for the incident. After Michelle starts a relationship with Abigail's brother, Josh, Tony then schemes to get her back. He takes sexual pictures of Abigail, and then transmits them to Josh's phone, from where he sends them to Michelle in order to make her think he's as crazy as his sister. Tony attempts a reconciliation, but she still turns him down.

In "Effy", Tony comes to terms with the destructive nature of his machinations when faced with a chase to find his sister, Effy Stonem and is given a terrible proposition: he must have sex with his unconscious sister if he wants her back from her captors. This scares him to tears, enough for Josh to tell him his lesson has been learned and let him go. His friendship with Sid is reaffirmed as Sid is the only one there for him in his crisis.

Later, in the series finale, Tony repays his debt to Sid by removing him from a mental institution and taking Sid to find Cassie. After leaving Sid at Anwar (Dev Patel)'s party, he tries to call Michelle, but loses her signal, resorting to standing in the middle of the road to get the signal back. He confesses to Michelle that he really does love her but is cut short when he is run over by a bus. Michelle is left staring at her phone as, elsewhere, Effy holds his bleeding body in shock, and the episode ends with Tony's status unclear.

=== The Lost Weeks ===
It is revealed in Sid's "Lost Weeks" video that Tony has been left in a coma following the accident. This is followed by Tony's video, in which he awakes from his coma while listening to a tape of the gang telling rude and shocking stories to try to shock him into consciousness.

=== Series 2 ===
In "Tony and Maxxie", the first episode of Series 2, Tony is shown to be physically and mentally changed by his accident, after suffering from a subdural hematoma. He has shown to have lost most of his characteristic wit and confidence that was present in series 1. In a conversation with Maxxie's mum, he states that "I'm stupid now" and on a bus, he holds Maxxie's hand for security after a bus drives past. Having lost the ability to write among other disabilities, he finally manages to scribble his name by "dancing" his way through, with guidance from Maxxie. In "Sketch", Tony starts to show visible signs of his previous affection for Michelle, but the consequences of his accident keep the relationship from working. Their brief sexual encounter reveals to Tony and the audience he has been rendered impotent as a result of the accident. Later on, he actively searches for her after the school play when Michelle does not appear as a result of Sketch (Aimee-Ffion Edwards) having poisoned her. He tells Michelle that he thinks he told her that he loved her the night of his accident; however, the conclusion is left on a slightly ambiguous note on whether or not he was guessing.

In "Sid", Tony is seen to have improved more, although his language tends to get jumbled. At the end of the episode, he successfully learns how to hold a cigarette. He helps Sid come to terms with his father's death, even by shutting his eyelids. The pair embark on an emotional embrace in a club, which symbolizes their shattered friendship and the pain the two are both suffering. In "Michelle", Michelle perseveres with Tony and attempts to seduce him despite the protests of Mrs. Stonem, Tony's mother. However Michelle's attempts fail with Tony still showing visible sexual difficulty, Michelle gets upset that Tony is still not 'better for her' – and leaves, stressing that she needs more time. Tony decides not to accompany the rest of the group on Michelle's birthday holiday but still gets her a present. After Michelle has had sex with Sid on the beach she finds that the birthday present is her watch that he was wearing at the time of his accident, with a note from Tony reading 'You said you needed some time'. In "Chris", Tony has started learning to swim again. He is seen in the pool with his father with a beginner's swimming group. He speaks to Chris (Joe Dempsie) afterwards proclaiming that he will 'Get everything back again' and that's including Michelle. He shows visible disgust and anger when finding out Sid and Michelle have become a couple.

In "Tony", Tony is shown attempting to return to his own lifestyle, which translates into going to clubs and taking drugs. After Cassie gives Tony an ecstasy pill, Tony confronts Sid and Michelle, who are now in a full-blown sexual relationship, expressing his sarcasm at how happy he is for them. Straight after this – he begins to react badly to the drugs and has a panic attack in the toilets. A mysterious girl approaches him and reveals details about Tony's life, despite her being a stranger. On the train ride up to a university open day – Tony is approached by a man who has visible horrific burns. The man tells Tony the story of how he came to be disfigured. Later on, Tony attends an open day at university, where he is in group interview with the same (now unscathed) man he met on the train. The mysterious girl is also at the meeting and verbally attacks the head of the university. After being ejected from the interview, Tony and the girl embark on many misdemeanors throughout the course of the day. It slowly becomes apparent to the viewer that the girl may be a figment of Tony's imagination – for example when the girl encourages (and successfully teaches) Tony how to swim, he is found alone in the pool. However, when interrogated about why he was in the pool, and Tony tries to explain about the girl, he is instructed to "not go with her." Later on Tony meets two promiscuous flatmates with the girl, who gave the girl a tattoo. Later on Tony and the girl consummate, and Tony regains his sexual libido. At the end of the episode, Tony is shown to have regained the majority of his intelligence and confidence. He then goes to tell Sid and Michelle that he loves them both and announces his disapproval of their sexual relationship. In its closing scenes, the tattoo that the girl had marked on her back is seen on Tony's, the implication being that the girl had been a creation of Tony's subconscious, ergo the manifestation of his animus or inner nature.

As the series progresses, Tony eventually manages to reconcile with Michelle and resumes his relationship with her. In the final episode, "Final Goodbyes", Tony receives grades better than all his friends in A-Levels; 3 As and a B. He also helps Sid steal Chris' coffin and later return it. Tony intends to go Cardiff University, while Michelle intends to go to University of York. Tony also sees Sid, who is leaving to find Cassie in New York. As Sid leaves, Tony is unable to hold back his tears. At the end of the episode, Tony and Michelle discuss their relationship and whether or not they will continue their relationship in university or say goodbye forever remains ambiguous to the audience. Nonetheless, they part on good terms.

=== Post-Series 2 ===
At the beginning of Series 3, Effy has moved into Tony's room and has given his signature duvet to Oxfam. Katie also mentions Tony and his popularity in one of her first conversations with Effy saying "Didn't you have a brother who was really cool and went mental, my friends fancied him". In Effy's episode in series 3, the scene where she is trying to call her friends and is ignored by them all directly mirrors Tony in Effy's first episode. In Effy's video diary (which takes place after the events of her episode), Effy pleads with Tony for help, also asking him not to shout at her again. She also pleads with him not to "do anything" to Cook, suggesting Tony has made threats.

In Series 4, Tony's picture is one of the photos present on Effy's wall, shown to be connected to Freddie's picture along with the other members of Effy's family. In "Effy", where Effy is receiving treatment in a psychiatric hospital, the incident where Tony was run over is shown to have profoundly damaged her.

One of the Skins writers suggested that prior to Skins Fire, Effy had moved to London to live with Tony, and they lived together for a while before Tony left with Michelle, to which Effy ended up flatting with Naomi.

== Analysis ==
Writer Russell T Davies opines that Tony belongs to the same character archetype as his earlier Stuart Alan Jones, on Queer as Folk in being an unlikable character with whom audiences fail to connect, "because there's barely any recognition. Tony isn't believable." Unlike Davies' character, Tony's narrative thrust is one towards being brought down, to suffer, and to show the audience that Tony's behaviour is wrong; to do this, "They had to mow him down in the finale to make us care!"
