= Skins Pure =

- Skins episodes
- Cassie Ainsworth in Skins Pure Part 1
- Episode nos.: Series 7 Episodes 3–4
- Directed by: Paul Gay
- Written by: Bryan Elsley
- Original air dates: 15 July 2013 (7.03); 22 July 2013 (7.04)

Guest appearances
- Neil Morrissey as Marcus Ainsworth; Daniel Ben Zenou as Yaniv; Olly Alexander as Jakob; Charlene McKenna as Maddie; Red Madrell as Amanda

Episode chronology
← Previous "Skins Fire"	Next → "Skins Rise"

"Skins Pure" is a feature-length episode of the E4 television series Skins. Airing in two parts in 2013, "Skins Pure" was the second of three feature-length episodes of a specially commissioned seventh series to bring the series to a close. While in its first six series Skins was a teen drama focusing on the life of Bristolian teenagers, "Skins Pure", as with previous episode "Fire", is a filmically and tonally distinct drama revisiting one of the show's characters as they adjust to adulthood.

"Skins Pure" focuses on the character of Cassie Ainsworth (Hannah Murray), a main character in the show's first two series. Formerly a daydreaming party girl with a number of mental problems, Cassie has put many of her problems behind her, and waitresses at a café in London after having spent several years travelling around America with Sid Jenkins (Cassie's on and off boyfriend from the first two series who travelled to America to find her at the end of the second series). In the story, Cassie forms an odd friendship with her stalker (Olly Alexander), and tries to support her younger brother, Reuben, as their father, Marcus (Neil Morrissey), fails to cope with the death of their mother.

== Synopsis ==
=== Part 1 ===
Cassie (Hannah Murray), now 23, lives in a shared house in London and works as a waitress at a café. While Cassie prefers to spend time alone in her apartment, and lives a relatively isolated existence, she receives occasional calls from her father, Marcus (Neil Morrissey), and younger brother, Reuben, who are now living in Wales following the death of Cassie's mother. One day, shortly before having a one-night stand with her Israeli co-worker, Yaniv (Daniel Ben Zenou), Cassie is approached by an artist at her work. The artist shows her a popular website called "Oblivion", which shows some dramatic and intense photographs of her. Shocked, Cassie looks through the website and discovers an entire collage of photos of her, some showing her standing by her bedroom window, dressed only in her underwear. Visibly shaken, Cassie confides in Maddie (Charlene McKenna), an acquaintance who lives a floor below her, and, upon further examination, realises that the photos of her bedroom window were most likely taken from the abandoned office building opposite. Through some deception, she is able to gain access to the empty office building, and finds evidence that someone is regularly accessing it. She hides, and waits for her stalker to appear. To her shock, it turns out to be Jakob (Olly Alexander), the young chef at the café where she works, and she attacks him before taking his camera. Cassie installs makeshift window blinds and continues with her life. When Jakob pleads with Cassie to return his camera, she ignores him. Later, she notices that she is attracting recognition from patrons of the café, and Maddie takes a look at the photos and tells Cassie that they are very beautiful. Cassie returns to the office building where Jakob hid and confronts him there. He admits that he has no sexual interest in her, and that his photos were purely for the benefit of others. He also chides Cassie for not being aware of her own beauty. Cassie then agrees to let him continue taking pictures of her.

=== Part 2 ===
Part 2 takes place some time after the events of the first part. Cassie and Jakob take a trip together to Wales to visit her father and Reuben. Cassie discovers that her father is an alcoholic, and has not been sending Reuben to school as he promised, and feels angered by his inability to pull himself together after the death of her mother. Jakob has a talk with him, and later photographs Cassie and Reuben on the beach. Cassie returns to London and is invited by Maddie for a night out at a club. At the club, Cassie sees that some of the photographs and videos of her and Reuben that Jakob took are being displayed on the screen and returns home abruptly, shocked. In a later phone conversation with Jakob, she learns that he had not sold them, and they had simply been lifted from his website. She tells Jakob that she loves him, which he reciprocates. The next day at work, she is approached by the photo artist who first showed her the pictures, along with a photographer, and asks her to model for a photoshoot. Cassie attends the photoshoot and the photos are later featured in a magazine. When she attempts to share her news with Jakob, he is furious that she allowed herself to be photographed by someone else for money, and accuses her of sleeping with the photographer, telling her not to come back when she storms off. The next day, Cassie is still distraught from the night before, and ends up going home with Yaniv after he offers her consolation. As they are about to have sex again, she receives a message from Jakob, who calls her a bitch and shows a photograph he covertly took of her kissing Yaniv. Outraged, Yaniv marches outside and beats Jakob up. Cassie stops the fight, but gets hurt in the process. Deciding that both men are a hindrance to her, she marches off, leaving the pair standing in the rain. She then returns to her apartment and looks for Maddie, but discovers that she has abruptly moved out. Later, she learns that both Jakob and Yaniv have left the country. Soon after, she is visited at her house by her father, who reveals that he has stopped drinking and is planning a trip to Italy with Reuben to clear his head and start painting again. He intends to take Reuben along and enroll him in a school there, but Cassie requests he stay in London with her for school, which he accepts. Cassie adapts to her new focus well. The episode ends with Reuben receiving a haircut from her co-worker Amanda (Red Madrell) and Cassie telling him that "everything's good."

== Writing ==
In part one of "Skins Pure", Cassie refers to an ex-boyfriend, but the character is unnamed in the episode. Co-creator Bryan Elsley confirmed using Twitter that this was intended to be a reference to Sid Jenkins from the show's first two series. This confirms that Sid found Cassie all those years ago in New York and they shared a happy relationship until it ended for unknown reasons.

== Reception ==
Part one received a generally positive response, with reviewers expressing slight apprehension in light of the ending for "Skins Fire". Den of Geek writer Caroline Preece said that "Skins Pure" fit in with the style of Cassie's original episodes, as these were "the most aesthetically beautiful" of the series, and, in relation to the previous episode, commented: "This is a different kind of young adulthood than the one encountered by girls like Effy Stonem, and that doesn't make it any less real or worth exploring." Preece also stated that a "world-weary Cassie is hard to take at first, but it’s strikingly different from what the show has done before." Morgan Jeffery of Digital Spy commented that part one provided little "light relief" from "the pitch-black 'Skins Fire'."
