= Cassie Ainsworth =

Fictional character from Skins

- Skins character
- Hannah Murray as Cassie
- First appearance: "Tony" (2007)
- Last appearance: Pure (2013)
- Created by: Bryan Elsley and Jamie Brittain
- Portrayed by: Hannah Murray
- Seasons: 1–2, 7
- Centric episode(s): "Cassie" (episode 1.02) "Cassie" (episode 2.09); Skins Pure (episodes 7.03–4)

In-universe information
- Nicknames: Cassie, Cass
- Occupation: Student; Waitress; Model
- Family: Marcus Ainsworth (father); Margeritte Ainsworth (mother; deceased); Reuben Ainsworth (younger brother)
- Significant other: Sid Jenkins (ex boyfriend)

Cassandra "Cassie" Ainsworth is a fictional character in the television series Skins, portrayed by Hannah Murray.

== Characterization and creation ==
She's thin, she's blonde, she says "wow" a lot.

— Nicholas Hoult as Tony Stonem, "Final Goodbyes" (Series 2)

Cassie is depicted as being eccentric and suffering from several mental disorders — most notably, anorexia nervosa — and multiple issues, including low self-esteem, suicidal ideation, and drug addiction, but is gentle-natured and friendly. Murray described her character as...

...very interesting because she has a lot of problems, and she's very troubled, and she's anorexic and completely lacking in self-esteem and self-belief, but along with that she's sort of quite smart. I think that she has quite a good reading on a lot of the other characters about what they're like and how they work and stuff, and I think she's a very clever girl, and she's also kind of silly and dreamy and quite fun at the same time as being a very tragic character.

— Hannah Murray, Interview with Digital Spy

The titular second episode of the first series and the penultimate episode of the second series focus on Cassie; the former focuses on her mental state and the latter focuses on her relationship with roommate Chris Miles (Joe Dempsie). The show's producers and writers described her centric episode in an interview with The Independent as being about "how she gets through her day without eating ... how she feels and what her tactics are", and campaigned to prevent any announcement of any counselling helplines during the episode's credits because they "didn't want a little preachy drama where everyone hugs at the end"; instead, the producers hoped that people would recognize their own faults in Cassie. One reviewer described Cassie as being "as pale as Hamlet's Ophelia and arguably twice as mad".

The viewer is reintroduced to Cassie five years after series two in Pure, in which she is shown to have changed in many ways. Where before she was bubbly, cheerful and unashamedly quirky, she is now a shadow of her former self, appearing tired and withdrawn, living in a shared flat in London and working as a waitress in a café to make ends meet. She avoids social contact with her co-workers and flatmates, and refuses to take drugs when offered them (as opposed to her affinity towards them in the past), and secludes herself in her room.

It seems as though every single shred of joy and wonder from her youth has been tarnished; consumed and rejected by the cold realities of adulthood and responsibility. Because of this, Cassie has become a stronger person; no more is she the awkward, free-spirited girl who would happily drag on a joint and dance the night away with Sid and Chris, she’s developed into a more bitter being – one who responds with “no” more than anything else.

— Chris Haydon, Analysis of Cassie in Skins Pure by Filmoria

== Character history ==
=== Series 1 ===
At the beginning of the first series, Cassie is recently discharged from hospital after a suicide attempt off-screen. Her friend Michelle Richardson (April Pearson) arranges for her to take Sid Jenkins' (Mike Bailey) virginity at a party. The two talk and even briefly kiss, although Cassie reveals she took a "shit load" of pills and passes out. The gang leave the party in order to get her to the hospital, although as soon as Tony parks up, she regains consciousness.

Cassie's central episode develops her eating disorder; her sexually stimulated parents are introduced, who are usually too busy having sex in order to pay attention to her issues. She informs them that it is her last clinic day. She is then picked up by the clinic taxi driver, Allan, with whom she seems to have a close relationship, and he promises not to tell anyone Cassie has put weights in her underwear in order to fool the clinic into thinking she has gained weight. She is sent to her final group therapy, where fellow patient Madison Twatter tells the group about a student named Sid Jenkins who has not paid him back for the drugs he supplied Sid with.

In college, Cassie runs into Sid at the canteen, and they talk. Having developed a crush on him on the previous episode, she reveals to him how she is able to get away with hiding the fact that she is not eating, but he is not impressed with it, and protests. When she states that "no-one cares," he responds "I care." Cassie also warns Sid that Mad also has his ID card. Throughout the episode, Cassie keeps seeing the word 'EAT!' on post-it notes, the plate of chips that Sid gives her and on text messages. This is implied to be a hallucination as when she asks Sid about it (assuming he sent the texts), Sid proves that he has not texted her. Cassie then calls Allan. She tells him someone keeps telling her to eat, and he suggests she is imagining the texts because she is mentally sending them to herself, because she wants to eat. Cassie gives in and eats a burger as the episode closes.

In "Chris", Cassie gives Sid more hints about her affection towards him and asks him on a date. However, in "Sid", he is grounded so Cassie tells him she will come over to his house. However, she is stood up due to Tony Stonem (Nicholas Hoult) convincing Sid to accompany him and Michelle at his choir performance, and when Sid admits he was with Michelle, Cassie lashes out at him. Later on she attempts suicide by intaking a large amount of pills mixed with vodka. When Sid tries to visit her in hospital, Jal Fazer (Larissa Wilson) forces him to leave. In "Michelle", Sid visits rehab in order to make amends with Cassie and she accepts his apology, but Sid is dismayed when she reveals that she has a boyfriend, Simon (James Buckley).

In "Effy", Sid calls her late at night after a fight with Tony and the two kiss. However, Sid stands her up again to rescue Tony and his sister Effy (Kaya Scodelario) from an overdose. In the finale, her parents move with her to Elgin, Scotland. She postpones her plans after discovering Sid loves her through a letter he wrote at the beginning of the episode, and the series ends with the pair holding hands on the same park bench Cassie attempted suicide on. It is implied that Sid lost his virginity to her at the start of the second series.

=== Series 2 ===
In the second series, Cassie is in a long-distance relationship with Sid; the relationship becomes strained when Sid begins to think Cassie has been unfaithful. He angrily accuses her of cheating, mistaking her closeness with her gay Scottish friend. Sid smashes his laptop in frustration and it is left ambiguous whether they have broken up or not, though the next morning, Cassie has blocked Sid's mobile number. After Sid's father Mark (Peter Capaldi) dies, Sid travels to Scotland to meet her as Cassie simultaneously travels back to Bristol to meet Sid. Frustrated at Cassie's disappearance and emotionally confused by his father's death, Sid begins a relationship with Michelle in the latter's central episode, after she finds him at the edge of a cliff, possibly to attempt suicide. However, Cassie catches them kissing in Sid's bedroom and keeps a cool head, although it is shown to have a huge impact on her in the next few episodes.

As a result of Sid's relationship with Michelle, Cassie becomes extremely promiscuous (with men and women) and mentally unstable: in "Chris", her actions result in her roommate Chris Miles (Joe Dempsie) losing his job as a junior property salesman and cause a significant amount of tension between him and his girlfriend Jal Fazer (Larissa Wilson) after Angie, Chris' ex-girlfriend and psychology teacher returns to Bristol; and in "Effy", she attributes her addiction to "mindless sex" to her failed relationship with Sid. After Sid becomes aware of her actions, he confronts her about her promiscuity, apologises for dating Michelle, and tells her he loves her. They reconcile.

Cassie's subplot in Chris' last three episodes of series 2 focuses on her friendship with him. She witnesses Chris suffering from two subarachnoid haemorrhages, the second fatal, taking his life in Cassie's central episode. She is traumatized and flees to New York City. There, she meets a kind young Iowan named Adam (Stephen Michael Kane), with whom she forms a strong platonic friendship when he offers her a place to stay in his apartment. He later leaves the apartment to find his ex-girlfriend at Cassie's suggestion and, distraught, Cassie gets a job as a waitress at Adam's old diner in Manhattan. The ultimate scene of the second series depicts Sid wandering through Times Square looking for her and ends with him turning to look inside the diner.

=== Series 6 ===
Cassie is briefly referred to by Doug in series 6 when he mentions to Liv that he once danced for a girl to help her get through an exam, referring to Cassie's centric episode in the second series. However he does not mention her by name.

=== Series 7 ===
Cassie is revisited five years later in series 7 in a feature-length episode, Pure. It is revealed that Sid did indeed find her and that the pair spent several years travelling around America, although she does not mention him by name. After ending the relationship, she moved back to England, though she moves into a shared flat in London instead of heading back to her hometown. She works as a waitress in a café, and later discovers a website titled 'Oblivion', filled with candid shots of her.
