= Joe Dempsie =

English actor

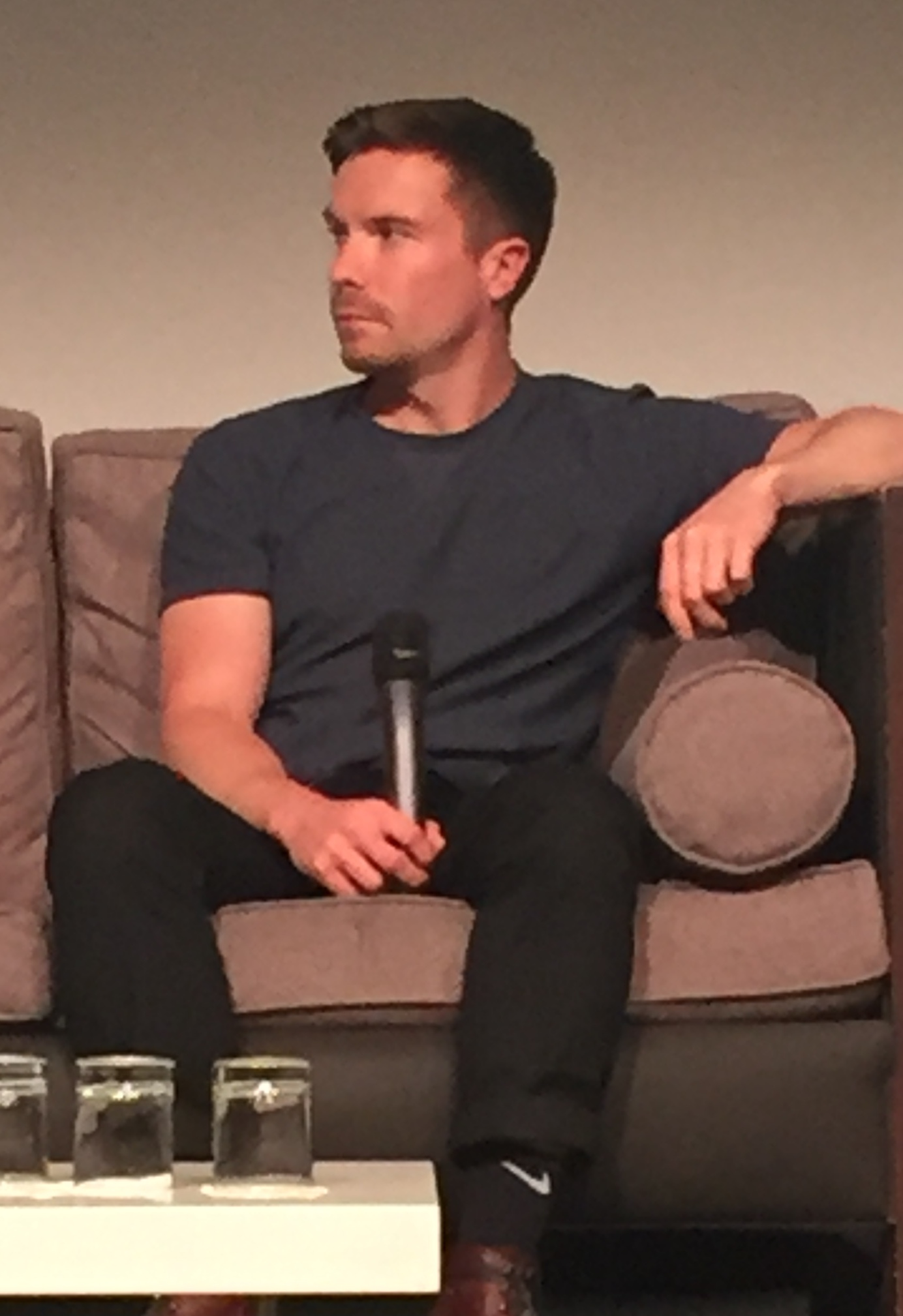
- Dempsie in 2018
- Born: 1987 or 1988 (age 38–39)
- Occupation: Actor
- Years active: 2000–present

Joe Dempsie (born 1987 or 1988) is an English actor, best known for his roles as Chris Miles in the E4 teen comedy-drama Skins (2007–2008) and Gendry in Game of Thrones (2011–2013; 2017–2019).

Dempsie's earlier acting credits include the medical dramas Peak Practice (2000), Doctors (2001–2003), and Sweet Medicine (2003), as well as the films One for the Road and Heartlands (2003). He also appeared in This is England '86 (2010) and This is England '90 (2015), Born and Bred, a BBC documentary-drama about Tony Martin, and as the villainous John in The Fades (2011).

== Early life and education ==
Joe Dempsie was born in 1987 or 1988 Dempsie's father was a social worker and his mother an educational psychologist. He grew up in West Bridgford, Nottinghamshire.

He was educated at West Bridgford School, and received acting training from the Central Junior Television Workshop in Nottingham.

== Career ==
Dempsie has been the voice of the Clearasil advertisements in the UK.

In episode 6 of the fourth series of Doctor Who, "The Doctor's Daughter", that aired on 10 May 2008, Dempsie played the character Cline, a soldier who watches his comrades die. On 18 April 2008, Dempsie appeared on Friday Night Project with Geri Halliwell. On 20 July 2008, he appeared at T4 on the Beach in Weston Super Mare alongside fellow Skins cast members. He appeared as Duncan McKenzie in 2009's The Damned United alongside Michael Sheen, Jim Broadbent, Stephen Graham and Timothy Spall. In November 2008, he appeared in "The Moment of Truth", episode 10 of the BBC show Merlin. He played Will, who is an old friend of Merlin's, from the village in which they grew up together.

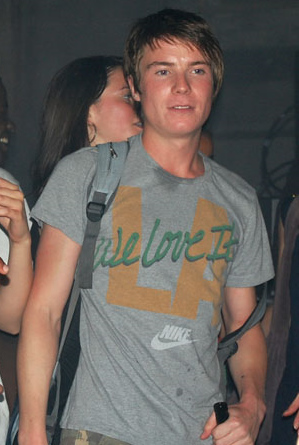
Joe Dempsie at Skins party 2007

In 2010, he voiced Steven, a gay teenager from Nottinghamshire in the Radio 4 play Once Upon a Time. He plays the character of Gendry Baratheon in HBO's series Game of Thrones based on George R. R. Martin's A Song of Ice and Fire novels. He appeared in the first three, seventh, and eighth of its eight seasons. He also appeared in the Channel 4 mini-series This Is England '86, as well as the follow-ups This Is England '88 and This Is England '90.

He appeared in Harry & Paul on BBC Two, appearing as a northerner who was presented as a gift from the character Harry was playing to his daughter. In 2011 he appeared in the BBC Three series The Fades (episodes 3 to 6), as John.

In January 2021, it was announced that Dempsie was cast as Nick in the Netflix thriller series Pieces of Her, which is adapted from the Karin Slaughter novel of the same name.

== Personal life ==
As of 2015, Dempsie lived in London.

He is a Nottingham Forest F.C. fan.

== Filmography ==
=== Film ===
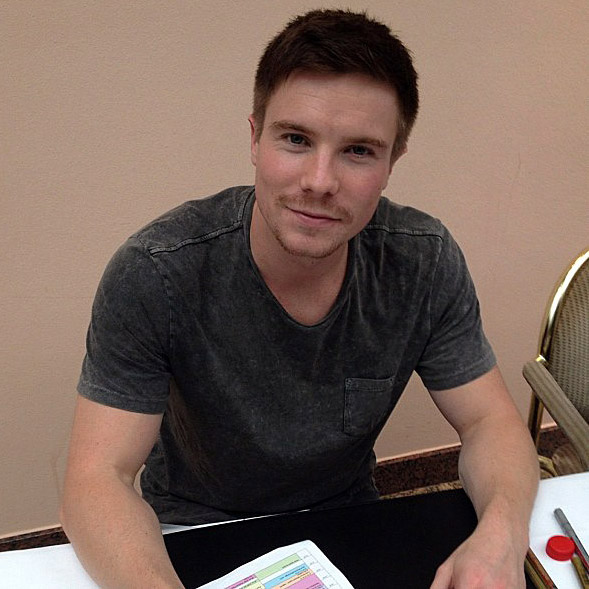
Joe Dempsie in 2012

Year	Title	Role(s)	Notes
2002	Heartlands	Craig	
2003	One for the Road	'TWOC'er (Joyrider)	
2008	Listen to the Words	Tim	
2009	Spirited	Dean	Short film
2009	The Damned United	Duncan McKenzie	
2010	Edge	Philip	
2010	Lucy Island	David	
2011	Blitz	Theo Nelson	
2011	Happy Clapper	Marshy	Short films
2011	Cardinal	Pride	Short films
2014	Monsters: Dark Continent	Frankie Maguire	
2015	Burn Burn Burn	James	
2016	Deep Swimmer	Mark Kennedy	
2016	Madly	(unknown)	Segment: 'I Do'
2017	StarGirl	Meteor Hunter 2	Short film
2017	Dark River	David	
2017	Come Out of the Woods	Ally	Short film
2018	Been So Long	Kestrel	
2019	Eighteen Weeks	Craig Tomlin	Short films
2020	Aftertaste	Alfie	Short films
2023	Soulmate	Neil	Short films
2024	Addition	Seamus	

=== Television ===
Year	Title	Role(s)	Notes
2000	Peak Practice	Leon	Episode: "Playing God"
2001	Doctors	Lee Lindsay	Episode: "Sins of the Brother"
2003	Sweet Medicine	Ben Campbell	Episode 2
2004	Doctors	Danny	Episode: "Rabbit in the Headlights"
2005	Born and Bred	Humphrey 'Bogie' Locke	Episode: "Community Spirits"
2006	To Kill a Burglar: The Tony Martin Story	Fred Barras	Television film
2007–2008	Skins	Chris Miles	19 episodes
2008	Doctor Who	Cline	Episode: "The Doctor's Daughter"
2008	Merlin	William	Episode: "The Moment of Truth"
2010	This Is England '86	Higgy	Mini-series; 3 episodes
2010	Devil in the Fog	George Treet / George Dexter	Mini-series; 2 episodes
2011–2013, 2017–2019	Game of Thrones	Gendry Baratheon	24 episodes
2011	The Fades	John	Mini-series; 4 episodes
2011	Moving On	Kieran Murphy	Episode: "The Poetry of Silence"
2012	Murder	Stefan	Mini-series; episode: "Joint Enterprise"
2012	Accused	Martin Cormack	Episode: "Mo's Story"
2013	Southcliffe	Chris Cooper	Mini-series; 3 episodes
2014	New Worlds	Ned Hawkins	Mini-series; 4 episodes
2015	The Gamechangers	Jamie King	One-off docudrama
2015	This Is England '90	Higgy	Mini-series; 3 episodes
2016	Ellen	Jason	Television film
2016	Retribution / One of Us	Rob Elliot	Mini-series; 4 episodes
2018–2019	Deep State	Harry Clarke	16 episodes
2020	Adult Material	Rich	4 episodes
2021	Love, Death & Robots	Laird (voice)	Episode: "The Tall Grass"
2022	Pieces of Her	Nick	Main cast. Mini-series; 7 episodes
2022	The Love Box in Your Living Room	(unknown)	Television film
2024	Showtrial	DI Miles Southgate	5 episodes
2024	Get Millie Black	Luke Holborn	Mini-series; 5 episodes
2025	Toxic Town	Derek Mahon	Mini-series; 4 episodes
2026	Sherwood	Alex Wood	mini-series
2026	The Capture	James Whitlock	mini-series

=== Radio ===
Year	Title	Role	Station
2009	Black Hearts in Battersea	Simon	BBC Radio 4
2010	Once Upon a Time	Steven	BBC Radio 4
2010	The Rain Maker	Son	BBC Radio 4
2013	Saturday Night and Sunday Morning	Arthur Seaton	BBC Radio 4
2016	The Beach (Book at Bedtime)	Narrator	BBC Radio 4
2016	Waiting for the Boatman	Cecco	BBC Radio 4

=== Voiceover work ===
Year	Title	Role	Notes
2008	Clearasil 'Lipstick' advert		
2011	Sky One		
2015–2023	Final Fantasy XIV	Ardbert, Arenvald Lentinus, Oschon	English version, replaced Stephen Hoo as Arenvald Lentinus
2022	Xenoblade Chronicles 3	Other	English version
