= Larissa Wilson =

English actress

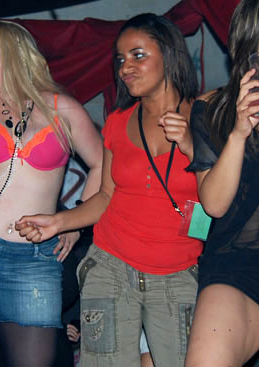
- Wilson in 2007
- Born: Larissa Hope Wilson; 5 May 1989 (age 36); Kingswood, South Gloucestershire, England
- Occupation: Actress
- Years active: 2007–2015, 2020–present
- Children: 1

Larissa Hope Wilson (born 5 May 1989) is an English actress and director, best known for her role as Jal Fazer in the first two series of the UK television series Skins (2007-2008). Other credits include Holby City (2008), Kingdom (2009), Tormented (2009). Sparticle Mystery (2011), The Town (2012), Trollied (2012), and Suspects (2014).

== Early life ==
Wilson was working at New Look, and auditioned for Skins during her lunch break at Oceana (nightclub) in Bristol. Wilson graduated from university with a First Class Degree in Creative Writing and Psychology.

== Career ==
Wilson made her acting debut in 2007 at age 17 when she starred as Jal Fazer in the British teen drama Skins, alongside Nicholas Hoult, Hannah Murray, and Dev Patel.

She appeared in Holby City (2008), Kingdom (2009), and was reunited with Skins co-star April Pearson in the British film Tormented (2009).

She has appeared in Sparticle Mystery (2011), The Town (2012), Trollied (2012), and Suspects (2014).

In 2020 she starred in the BBC Sounds podcast series Murmurs.

She made her directorial debut in 2020 with the short film SHIFT.

== Filmography ==
=== Television ===
Year	Title	Role	Notes
2007–2008	Skins	Jal Fazer	18 episodes
2008	Holby City	Rebecca Webster	2 episodes
2009	Kingdom	Donna	1 episode
2011	Sparticle Mystery	Anita	2 episodes
2012	The Town	Sarah	1 episode
2012	Trollied	Shopper	3 episodes
2014	Suspects	Kelly Freeman	2 episodes

=== Film ===
Year	Title	Role	Notes
2009	Tormented	Khalillah	Film
2010	Conviction	School girl	Lead
2011	Shirley	Iris Bassey	TV film
2011	The Boarding School Bomber	Student	TV film
2024	We Move	Alicia	Short film

=== Director ===
Year	Title	Note
2020	SHIFT	Short film
