= Mike Bailey (actor) =

English actor and singer

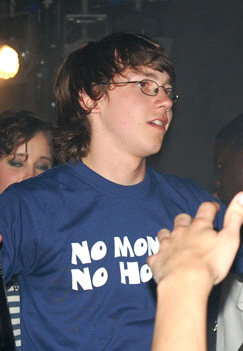
- Bailey in 2007
- Born: Michael James Bailey; 6 April 1988 (age 38); Bristol, England
- Occupation: Actor
- Years active: 2002–2017

Michael James Bailey (born 6 April 1988) is an English former actor. He is best known for playing the role of Sid Jenkins in the first two seasons of the British teen drama Skins.

In 2017, Bailey left his acting career and became a teacher.

== Career ==
In the Skins series 1 finale, Bailey sang a musical ensemble version of "Wild World" by Cat Stevens. He, along with the rest of the main cast of series 1 and 2, did not return for the third series.

He also appeared in the Channel 4 drama 1066 The Battle for Middle Earth as Tofi, which was broadcast in May 2009.

In March 2012, he filmed in Birmingham for teen comedy We Are the Freaks, directed by Justin Edgar and produced by Alex Usborne at 104 Films. The show released in 2013.

== Personal life ==
After Bailey's last project in 2017, he completed a drama degree and completed teacher training, and now works as a secondary school drama teacher at Bedminster Down School in Bristol.

== Filmography ==
Year	Title	Role	Notes/ref.
2007–2008	Skins	Sid Jenkins	19 episodes
2007	Skins: The Lost Weeks	Sid Jenkins	Web series, 3 episodes
2010	1066: The Battle for Middle Earth	Tofi	2 episodes
2010	Three Moments in Heaven	Jamie	
2013	We Are the Freaks	Parsons	
2013	Faulty	Nigel	
2016	Reunion in Hell	Milo	
2017	Hers and History	Luke	Web series 8 episodes
