= Skins (British TV series) =

British teen drama series (2007–2013)

- Genre: Teen drama; Comedy drama; Coming-of-age; Black comedy; Psychological drama
- Created by: Bryan Elsley; Jamie Brittain
- Starring: Nicholas Hoult; Hannah Murray; Larissa Wilson; Joe Dempsie; Mike Bailey; Mitch Hewer; Dev Patel; Daniel Kaluuya; April Pearson; Kaya Scodelario; Aimee-Ffion Edwards; Jack O'Connell; Merveille Lukeba; Lisa Backwell; Luke Pasqualino; Lily Loveless; Ollie Barbieri; Megan Prescott; Kathryn Prescott; Dakota Blue Richards; Alexander Arnold; Freya Mavor; Laya Lewis; Sean Teale; Will Merrick; Sebastian de Souza; Jessica Sula; Sam Jackson
- Theme music composer: Fat Segal
- Country of origin: United Kingdom
- Original language: English
- No. of series: 7
- No. of episodes: 61 (list of episodes)

Production
- Executive producers: Bryan Elsley; Charles Pattinson; George Faber; John Griffin; John Yorke; Matt Jones
- Producers: Chris Clough; Matt Strevens; Neil Duncan; Toby Welch
- Production locations: Bristol, England
- Camera setup: Single-camera
- Running time: 44–49 minutes
- Production companies: Company Pictures; Storm Dog Films

Original release
- Network: E4
- Release: 25 January 2007 – 5 August 2013

Related
- Skins (American TV series)

Skins is a British teen drama television series that follows the lives of a group of teenagers in Bristol, England, through the two years of sixth form. Its controversial storylines explore issues such as dysfunctional families, mental illness (such as depression, eating disorders, post-traumatic stress disorder, and bipolar disorder), adolescent sexuality, gender, substance abuse, death, and bullying.

Each episode generally focuses on a particular character or subset of characters and the struggles they face in their lives, with the episodes named after the featured characters. The show was created by father-and-son television writers Bryan Elsley and Jamie Brittain for Company Pictures, and premiered on E4 on 25 January 2007.

Skins went on to be a critical success as well as a ratings winner and has developed a cult following. It has since been considered revolutionary, and continues to draw praise for its depiction of problems that British youth experience, which was generally not showcased on public TV at the time. Over its initial six-year run, Skins was atypical of ongoing drama series in that it replaced its primary cast every two years. Plans for a film spin-off were first discussed in 2009, but ultimately did not come to fruition. Instead, a specially commissioned seventh and final series of the show was broadcast in 2013, featuring some of the cast from its 2007–2010 run.

Other ventures to expand the brand have included a short-lived American remake, which aired on MTV in 2011, but was cancelled after one season after advertisers abandoned the series in response to controversy surrounding the series' sexual content.

== Plot ==
=== Series 1 ===
Episode one, "Tony", is an ensemble piece that introduces the characters and the format that will be seen in the show. The attractive, popular, and intelligent Tony (Nicholas Hoult) arranges for his friends to attend a party held by upper-class girl Abigail Stock (Georgina Moffat). The second episode, "Cassie", focuses on Cassie's final visit to an eating disorder clinic under the supervision of Abigail's mother, Dr Stock. In her day-to-day life, she hallucinates messages instructing her to eat, which seem to come from Sid, for whom she develops feelings. Jal's episode follows her attempt to win BBC Young Musician of the Year, and her strained relationship with her famous musician father.

When drug dealer "Mad Twatter" smashes her clarinet as payback for Sid not giving him money for drugs he bought, Jal's father sees to it he will not bother the group again. In "Chris", Chris's mother abandons him, leaving £1,000 in cash. He blows the money on a party, and is eventually helped into temporary student accommodation by his psychology teacher, Angie (Siwan Morris). Episode five, "Sid", shows Sid's struggle with his parents' breakup while Tony organises a scheme to set him up with Michelle. A heartbroken and fragile Cassie attempts suicide by drug overdose.

"Maxxie and Anwar" focuses on the conflict between Anwar's Muslim faith and Maxxie's homosexuality. On a school trip to Russia, Tony tells Maxxie that he wants to "try something new", and Michelle ultimately witnesses Tony cheating on her with Maxxie. In "Michelle", Michelle faces up to Tony's manipulative and cheating ways. She begins to date Josh Stock (Abigail's brother, played by Ben Lloyd-Hughes) until Tony breaks them up by sending naked photos of Abigail from Josh's phone. In "Effy", Josh seeks revenge on Tony and his younger sister, Effy (Kaya Scodelario), by drugging her and, in effect, holding her for ransom.

In the finale episode, "Everyone", it is Anwar's birthday. Anwar and Maxxie are reconciled when Anwar's father welcomes Maxxie to the birthday party, accepting his homosexuality. Chris' relationship with Angie ends violently when her fiancé returns. Tony confesses to Michelle that he loves her and wants to change his manipulative ways (whilst on the phone), only to be hit by a bus, as Effy watches on from Sid's dad Mark's car. The characters begin to sing "Wild World" by Cat Stevens as Tony lies unconscious and Sid searches for Cassie.

=== Series 2 ===
The second series premiered on E4 on 11 February 2008; however, the first episode was available in four parts to MySpace users prior to airing. "Maxxie and Tony" starts the series, showcasing Tony's impairments following his accident and Maxxie's involvement in his recovery. The episode also reveals more about Maxxie's life; revealed are his ambitions to be a dancer, his surname, his difficulties with homophobic bullies, and his parents (played by Bill Bailey and Fiona Allen). The second episode introduces a new character in Maxxie's stalker, young carer Lucy, also known as "Sketch" (Aimee-Ffion Edwards).

Sketch disrupts the school play organised by drama lecturer Bruce (Shane Richie) to steal a kiss from Maxxie. To spite Maxxie, Sketch begins a sexual relationship with Anwar. Episode three focuses on Sid's life, coping with Cassie's departure to Scotland, and he suspects her of cheating. Sid's Scottish relatives visit and his mother (Josie Lawrence) temporarily moves back in; Sid's father, Mark (Peter Capaldi), does not want to disappoint his father, as he has yet to tell him they have separated. Mark stands up to his own father's abuse and ultimately reconciles his relationship with Sid, allowing for the unforeseen, peaceful death of Mark. Sid reconnects with brain-damaged Tony when he is able to open up to him about his father's death.

In "Michelle", the group goes on a camping trip to a beach. Maxxie discovers Sketch having sex with Anwar, and Sid sleeps with Michelle, starting a relationship; he comes home to find Cassie waiting for him. In "Chris", Chris agrees to start a job and Jal learns to start being more open to new things, and the two end up in a relationship. Chris cheats on her with Angie after Cassie tells Chris that Jal left him, but they move back in together, and Jal discovers she is pregnant.

"Tony", directed by recurring actor Harry Enfield, sees Tony Stonem attend a university open day not long after taking an ecstasy tablet that awakens elements of his old personality. In a visual metaphor for Jungian psychology, a mysterious girl who is a projection of Tony's subconscious helps him conquer his mental impairments. His old self again, he confronts Michelle and Sid and tells them their relationship is "wrong".

With the Stonem parents unable to run the house, Effy takes over in episode seven. At her private school, she befriends weird girl Pandora Moon (Lisa Backwell). She also resolves to solve her brother's and his friends' relationship problems. Cassie is hurting and turning to promiscuity, but, through Effy's machinations, she and Sid get back together, as do Tony and Michelle.

Actor Daniel Kaluuya wrote "Jal", which sees her struggle with her pregnancy, while Chris is rushed to hospital with a subarachnoid haemorrhage. Meanwhile, Maxxie introduces his new boyfriend, James (Sean Verey). In "Cassie", Jal tells Chris she is having an abortion. Cassie feels, without her eating disorder and other problems, she is disempowered; she is traumatised when Chris dies in her arms from the subarachnoid haemorrhage and flees to New York City.

In the series finale, the gang get their A Level results, collectively mourn Chris and eventually part ways, with Sid following Cassie to New York (it is left ambiguous whether he finds her), Anwar moving with Maxxie and James to London, and Sketch left behind. The series ends with Effy in Tony's bed, revelling in the artwork of emotions she has created as she claims her top place in their social world, and also as series' lead in the upcoming series.

=== Series 3 ===
The new cast are introduced on their first day at Roundview College in the series premiere, "Everyone". JJ Jones, James Cook and Freddie McClair are best friends to begin with. Twins Katie and Emily Fitch know Naomi Campbell from school, but are distant with her, because Katie is homophobic and suspects her of being a lesbian. The gang meets Effy and sidekick Pandora, Katie wants to become Effy's best friend, and both Cook and Freddie are instantly smitten. Cook passes a test set by Effy and begins a casual sexual relationship with her.

Episode two focuses on Cook, who invites the whole group to his birthday party, although their friendships are not very strong yet; chaos ensues, and Cook angers local gangster Johnny White (Mackenzie Crook). Thomas Tomone is only introduced in the third episode. He is an immigrant from the Congo, and develops a crush on Pandora. He endears himself to the group when he is able to get Johnny White off their backs by besting him in a pepper-eating competition. However, despairing at his decadent life in Bristol, his mother brings him back to the Congo. In "Pandora", Pandora's innocent slumber party becomes an MDMA-fuelled rave after Katie spikes the brownies. Emily and Naomi kiss; Naomi denies being gay, but urges Emily to admit that she is, yet she denies it. Pandora allows Cook to take her virginity, but regrets it when later Thomas returns from Congo.

Freddie's episode shows his difficult relationship with his widower father (Simon Day) and his sister Karen (Klariza Clayton), who has ambitions to be a celebrity. His father converts Freddie's shed — his personal sanctuary — into a dance studio for Karen. Freddie witnesses Effy's parents' break-up, discovers that Cook slept with Karen, gets punched in the face by his father, and discovers her and Cook's relationship.

In "Naomi", Naomi runs against Cook for student president on the basis that, if he wins, she will have to sleep with him. When he wins, however, he does not force her to take it further than kissing. She and Emily begin a sexual relationship, but Naomi is unwilling to accept the reality of its romantic nature. In "JJ", Freddie and Cook's feud over Effy negatively affects JJ. At Emily's encouragement, he manages to confront them both about it, and later loses his virginity when Emily decides to have pity sex with him. Thomas discovers that Pandora has been cheating on him, and, while high on JJ's medication, Cook reveals to Freddie that Effy loves Freddie and not him.

In Effy's episode, she has nothing: her Queen Bee status has been usurped by Katie, sex with Cook means nothing, and her home life is a wreck. She finally feels something when she has sex with Freddie, but, after being tormented by Katie, an intoxicated Effy hits her with a rock. Katie is recovering in "Katie and Emily", but her relationship with her sister is falling apart. However, at the college ball, Emily is able to assert herself, and Naomi confesses she loves Emily back. Thomas and Pandora also reunite. The finale episode sees Cook and Effy hiding out with Cook's father (Matt King). JJ tracks them down, however, and forces Effy to confess it is Freddie whom she loves, but Cook is adamant he loves her, too. Freddie closes the series, asking "What do we do now?".

=== Series 4 ===
Series four begins with the suicide of a girl named Sophia (Amberley Gridley) while she is high on MDMA at a club Thomas works at. A police inspector (Pauline Quirke) questions the entire gang. Thomas gives in to temptation and sleeps with another girl, resulting in the break-up of him and Pandora. Thomas is expelled by the new headmaster (Chris Addison) for his unseemly connection to the death of Sophia. In "Emily", Emily's mother (Ronni Ancona) has still not accepted the fact that her daughter is a lesbian and tries to interfere with her relationship.

Emily discovers Naomi had slept with Sophia, and is the one who sold her the MDMA, leaving their relationship fraught. In "Cook", Cook is in trouble for an assault and, to be a better influence on his younger brother, accepts a prison sentence for dealing the drugs that led to Sophia's death, covering for Naomi. When Katie loses her job and discovers she has premature menopause, she cannot confide in her mother at first because of the stress of their bankruptcy and homelessness. The Fitches are forced to move into Naomi's house.

Freddie worries over Effy's psychological state in his centric episode, as she is developing a psychotic depression that resembles what his mother had before she committed suicide. He is able to save Effy after an attempt on her life; she is hospitalised and he is left desolate. This situation takes a large toll on Effy's and Freddie's relationship. JJ's episode sees him fall in love with a single mother called Lara (Georgia Henshaw), through whom he finds a new-found confidence and begins to doubt whether he really needed to be so highly medicated his whole life.

In the penultimate episode, Effy's psychiatric counsellor, John Foster (Hugo Speer), uses unorthodox hypnotic methods to cure Effy's depression, making her forget and want to abandon her old friends. After an incident at the spot of Tony's accident, where she nearly commits suicide again, her psychosis comes back, and Freddie insists Foster cease treating Effy. Later, Foster lures Freddie to discuss Effy, and brutally murders Freddie with a baseball bat. In the finale episode, everyone deals with Freddie's absence, thinking that he has left of his own volition.

Naomi and Emily finally repair their damaged relationship, scorched by cheating, and Naomi confesses she has loved Emily since they first met. Thomas and Pandora are thrown back together by chance when they both get into Harvard University, and a mostly recovered Effy holds Freddie's birthday party in his shed, knowing that he loved her and pining for his return. Cook, who is on the run from the police after breaking out of prison, uncovers Dr Foster's killing and after confronting him, furiously lunges at Foster. The series ends here in freeze frame, leaving both Cook's and John Foster's fates unknown.

=== Series 5 ===
The series begins by introducing unconventional newcomer Franky, to whom secretly insecure popular girl Mini takes a dislike. Mini ingratiates Franky into her group only to disown her. Franky is on the verge of breakdown, her adoptive father's air revolver in hand, when mysterious stranger Matty convinces her of her self-worth. Mini's sweet friend Grace establishes new friendships with Franky and the school's other outsiders, metalhead Rich and farmhand Alo.

In episode two, "Rich", Grace finds herself drawn to Rich. She attempts to help him win over an elusive girl, and eventually he gets past his shyness to realise his attraction to her, too. After Mini's fashion show in "Mini", the two agree to begin dating. Mini, however, feels pressured to have sex with boyfriend Nick, who does not know she is a virgin. Mini's cruelty to Grace and her new friends backfires when her fashion show goes completely awry. When she realises that her best friend Liv has slept with Nick, she forces herself to have sex with him, which is disappointing. She is devastated to see the parallel between her and her promiscuous mother (Clare Grogan) as they encounter one another on their walks of shame.

The affair between Nick and Liv continues, though they both suspect Mini knows when she unifies the two groups of friends under Liv's roof for a party, in "Liv". Because she cannot handle the stress of her family life or Mini's scheme, Liv leaves the house. In town, she meets drifter Matty, and the pair embark on a drug-fuelled bender. Back at her house, she discovers that Matty is, in fact, Nick's brother, and Liv's affair with Nick comes out in the open. The brothers reconcile, however, and Matty comes home again.

In "Nick", Matty is re-enlisted at Roundview, but his relationship with Liv causes a new love triangle to form among him, Liv and Franky. Having lost both Mini and Liv, and now living in Matty's shadow, Nick has a nervous breakdown and smashes up his house with a golf club. Through Matty, however, Nick comes to see their father, Leon (Dorian Lough), and his parenting in a more negative light, and the two brothers take a stand. In his episode, Alo's parents take him out of sixth form to work on the farm, and, after he causes an explosion, they sell all of his belongings.

In protest, he throws a massive party and, when he confronts his parents, his father suffers a heart attack. Rather than burden his friend Rich, who has just proudly had sex for the first time with Grace, he goes home and attempts to repair things with his parents. In "Grace", Grace introduces Rich to her parents; Rich is shocked to discover that her father is headmaster David Blood (Addison). Blood schemes to have Grace's grades slip on her drama assessment, a staging of Twelfth Night, so that he can justify removing her from Roundview.

Grace sees her dilemma, as peacemaker, through Hamlet's "sea of troubles" soliloquy; she uses Twelfth Night to bring the love triangle among Matty, Liv and Franky to a head, and ultimately receives an A. After Blood still forces Grace to change schools, Rich is inspired by Romeo and Juliet, and proposes to her. In the series finale, the two attempt to marry in secret with the gang as witnesses, though Alo's van breaks down.

Mini begins to recognise her attraction to Franky and becomes very protective of her. After an attempt at sex with Matty, Franky has a panic attack, charges through a forest, and accidentally falls over a ledge. After being rescued by Mini, Matty and Liv, Franky reveals more to her friends about her insecurities. Though Blood intervenes and Grace and Rich do not marry, they are happily allowed to continue dating and the gang, solidified as friends, party together at a local fête.

=== Series 6 ===
Series 6 starts with the gang on holiday in Morocco; Franky has lost her virginity to Matty but is already becoming bored, and is tempted by wealthy drug dealer Luke (Joe Cole). Mini also decides to take Alo's virginity and swears him to secrecy. Matty pursues Luke and Franky, which quickly escalates into a car chase; his truck overturns, putting Grace in a critical condition, and he runs away to avoid being arrested for the possession of the marijuana and ketamine Luke placed inside his vehicle.

Back in Bristol, Franky struggles to cope with her guilt, and Rich is prevented by her father from seeing Grace in hospital, where she lies in a coma, in "Rich". When Mr Blood takes Grace for treatment in Switzerland, Rich squats in the Bloods' home for some time, convinced that Grace is still alive, but, after a party at the house, a mournful David Blood informs him that Grace has subsequently died. In "Alex", new kid Alex, who is a little strange, arrives while the gang are at odds still mourning Grace; Liv in particular develops feelings for him, only for him to disclose to her that he is, in fact, gay. Nevertheless, they form a close in bond, particularly as Mini remains distant from Liv.

In her episode, Franky, overwhelmed with guilt, escapes to "bad boy" Luke for companionship and excitement. Her actions are negatively viewed, and she quickly becomes alienated. She turns against authoritative figures at school and at home, pushing her to get more involved in her violent and destructive relationship with Luke. During a full-blown fight at a bar, Nick saves Franky and quietly confesses he loves her. After Luke gets rough with her, Franky escapes to a park near home where her father meets her; he is there to fend Luke away when he returns in an attempt to win Franky back.

Subsequently, in "Mini", Mini continues to distance herself from her friends after Grace's death, while continuing her "no strings attached" relationship with Alo, but is hit further by the revelation that she is pregnant with Alo's baby. To get away from it, she clings to her deadbeat dad, Gregory, who she is convinced has changed. Though he abandons her, with the support of Franky, she is able to accept her pregnancy.

In "Nick", Nick struggles to find money to pay for Russian gangsters to smuggle Matty back into England, all the while struggling with his feelings for Franky. After emotionally pouring his heart out to her during an argument in a nightclub toilet, he subsequently blows the deal, but, to his happiness, Franky finally reciprocates his feelings, and they form a relationship. In "Alo", Alo is finally forced to grow up when, in his effort to put his failed relationship with Mini behind him, he has sex with a girl named Poppy Champion (Holly Earl), whom he did not initially know to be underage.

Poppy reports him to the police when he breaks up with her. Although charges are eventually dropped, he and Mini are forced farther apart than ever before. "Liv" focuses on Liv's isolation. Since meeting Alex, she has been 'dealing' with Grace's death by going out, partying, drinking, and staying at Alex's house instead of her own home. Alex leaves Bristol one weekend, and Liv finds that, aside from her sister Maude, she has truly drifted from her friends, and Mini in particular.

She begins to have intense pains and feels a large lump on her side, which she worries might be ovarian cancer. Ultimately, the lump turns out to be a grief-induced hallucination; responding to this, Liv takes a step towards dealing with Grace's death by placing flowers next to her tombstone alongside Rich, Doug, and Maude. While Mini's mum tries to convince her to give her child for adoption once it is born, and Franky is conflicted after Matty returns to Bristol, in "Franky & Mini", the girls decide to leave everything behind and abscond.

Soon, Mini wishes to return home, despite Franky's insistence. Alo learns of Mini's pregnancy and, to her surprise, in the end, vows to take care of her no matter what. In the finale, Franky attempts to track down her mother, but instead finds her biological sister, who declares that their mother has died. At Alex's house party to celebrate leaving Bristol behind, she tells both Matty and Nick she loves them, but cannot be with either of them.

In the conclusion, Mini goes into labour, while Franky's sister takes her to see her mother, who is not dead, after all. Nick and Matty bond once again, and the latter turns himself in to the police. In the final scene, playing in parallel, Alex leaves Bristol for Thailand; Alo and Liv are beside Mini as she gives birth; Franky lays eyes on her mother; and Rich, outside the room where Mini is giving birth, looks at the camera and says "bye".

=== Series 7 ===
The seventh series, titled Skins Redux, aired on 1 July 2013. It saw the return of former Skins stars Hannah Murray as Cassie, Jack O'Connell as Cook, and Kaya Scodelario as Effy in three individual stories. Lily Loveless as Naomi and Kathryn Prescott as Emily also starred in guest roles. The three stories have their own titles: Skins Fire (Effy), Skins Pure (Cassie) and Skins Rise (Cook). The six-part series began filming on 22 October 2012 and concluded at the end of January 2013.

Skins Fire depicts Effy as a 21-year-old hedge fund receptionist for a London firm. She lives with Naomi, who is drifting through life with vague ambitions of being a stand-up comedian. Effy is much more serious and driven than in the past, and impresses her bosses enough to win a shot at being a stock trader. In her attempts to succeed in her career, she becomes embroiled in an insider trading scandal, as well as romantically involved with her boss, Jake (Kayvan Novak). To spare her lovelorn friend Dom (Craig Roberts) from jail time for his part in the crime, she makes a full confession to the Financial Services Authority of hers and Jake's activities. Meanwhile, Naomi reveals that she has cancer, and pleads with Effy not to tell Emily, who is in New York on an internship. Dom and Effy support Naomi until it is clear her condition is terminal; Emily returns to London, hurt and betrayed, and comforts Naomi while Effy is prosecuted.

Skins Pure catches up with Cassie at 23, living a solitary existence in London and waitressing after breaking up with an ex-boyfriend in America. The new Cassie no longer does drugs, and has recovered from her eating disorder. After discovering someone has been secretly taking artistic photos of her and uploading them to the Internet, she tracks down her stalker, and discovers it to be the cook at her café, Jakob (Olly Alexander). After realising Jakob's attention gives her confidence, she allows him to continue photographing her on her terms, in an explicitly non-sexual friendship. While trying to support her depressed father and little brother after the death of her mother, her friendship with Jakob slowly comes apart as his jealousy grows irrational, particularly when Cassie models for a professional shoot. Ultimately, Cassie chooses to leave behind her friendship with Jakob and another man who had been pursuing her romantically (Daniel Ben Zenou) to focus on raising her little brother while her father recuperates in Italy.

Skins Rise follows Cook at 21, who is on the run and living alone in Manchester. In an introductory voiceover, Cook explains his thoughts and alludes towards a murder he may have committed; it is implied, but not outright stated, that he is avoiding capture after killing John Foster a few years back. He is now a drug dealer and has a semi-serious relationship with a woman named Emma (Esther Smith), but becomes mesmerised by Charlie (Hannah Britland), the girlfriend of local drug lord Louis (Liam Boyle) after he is asked to watch over her for a few days. After Louis brutally kills a man named Jason (Lucien Laviscount) for having an affair with Charlie, Cook flees Manchester, taking Emma with him. En route, Charlie calls Cook and begs him to take her with them. The three end up at Emma's family's old country home, in a remote part of the country. Not long after though, Louis arrives, explaining that he tracked their car. After Charlie refuses to go with him, the three leave the house and find Emma's parents' car abandoned, indicating they have been killed. The trio are stranded in the woods, where Louis catches up with and murders Emma. Seeing this, Cook decides he is done running, confronting Louis and beating him to a pulp. He declares, "I'm Cook. You thought you could kill me? I'm fucking Cook." He helps Charlie escape and alerts the police to Louis. In a final voiceover, he ponders the significance of life and death and how it gets ‘under your skin’. His fate, like at the end of season 4, remains ambiguous.

== Cast and characters ==
=== First generation ===
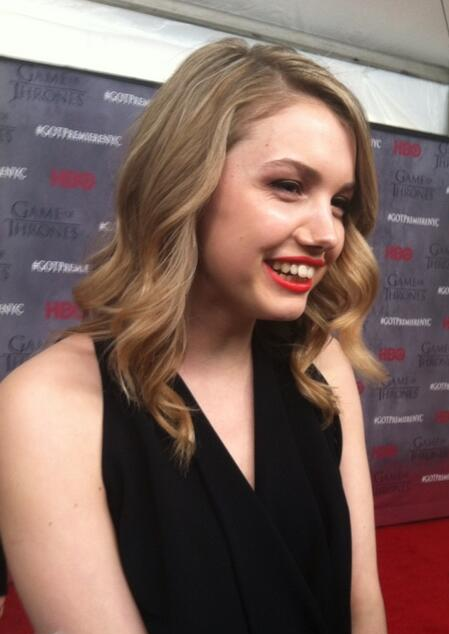
Hannah Murray, who played Cassie Ainsworth during the first generation

Name	Portrayed by	Notes
Tony Stonem	Nicholas Hoult	An intelligent and popular boy. His manipulative ways often go unnoticed by many, and are a catalyst for the majority of the events in the series.
Sid Jenkins	Mike Bailey	Tony's best friend and has an entirely opposite personality to him. He lacks confidence, is socially uneasy and struggles with school work, and has a crush on Michelle.
Michelle Richardson	April Pearson	Tony's girlfriend, who can never stay angry at his mischievous behaviour for long. Outwardly, Michelle appears shallow, vain and conceited, but she works hard, has a strong interest in French and Spanish, and is very emotionally mature.
Cassie Ainsworth	Hannah Murray	An eccentric girl who has an eating disorder. She attempts to hide her own struggles with mental health while her flamboyant parents ignore her in favour of their new baby, and she has a crush on Sid.
Chris Miles	Joe Dempsie	The party animal of the group. He has a difficult home life; he lost his brother to a hereditary subarachnoid haemorrhage at a young age, and is living alone due to his ambivalent father and absent mother. He has a crush on his psychology teacher Angie (Siwan Morris).
Jal Fazer	Larissa Wilson	A sensible girl with a talent for playing the clarinet. Her runaway mother has left Jal with her famous musician father and aspiring rapper brothers. She is best friends with Michelle.
Maxxie Oliver	Mitch Hewer	An openly gay boy who has a passion for dance. He is portrayed as attractive, seductive and talented, and is well accepted by most of his friends and family, though his fights with his father about his future are depicted. He is best friends with Anwar.
Anwar Kharral	Dev Patel	Has a slightly off-the-wall personality and is known for his silly antics and sense of humour. While he takes a pick-and-choose approach to Islam, and has no qualms about indulging in premarital sex and usage of alcohol and drugs in spite of his religion's rules against them, he has some difficulty fully accepting Maxxie's sexuality.
Lucy "Sketch"	Aimee-Ffion Edwards	A quiet and scheming Welsh girl who is polite yet unnerving. Living two buildings over and having a clear view of his room, she develops an obsession for Maxxie and becomes his stalker. Without her father, she is a young carer for her disabled mother Sheila, who has multiple sclerosis.
Effy Stonem	Kaya Scodelario	Tony's younger sister, and shares many of her brother's qualities. She is mysterious and manipulative, and selectively mute during the first series; she regularly breaks the fourth wall. Effy later becomes a main character in the second generation of Skins.
Abigail Stock	Georgina Moffat	An upper class school girl with sociopathic tendencies, and one of Tony's many sexual conquests.
"Posh" Kenneth	Daniel Kaluuya	A posh black boy who goes to the same college as the main cast and often spends time with the group.

The central cast's parents are often played by well-known British comedy actors credited in a guest starring role. Harry Enfield and Morwenna Banks act as Tony and Effy's parents, Jim and Anthea Stonem. Peter Capaldi and Josie Lawrence act as Sid's parents, Mark and Liz Jenkins. Arabella Weir acts as Michelle's mother, Anna Richardson, and Danny Dyer as her stepfather, Malcolm. Neil Morrissey and Naomi Allisstone act as Cassie's parents, Marcus and Margeritte Ainsworth.

Mark Monero acts as Jal's father, Ronny Fazer, and Josette Simon as her estranged mother, Elaine. Inder Manocha and Nina Wadia act as Anwar's parents, Istiak and Bibi Kharral. Bill Bailey and Fiona Allen act as Maxxie's parents, Walter and Jackie Oliver. Mark Heap acts as Chris's estranged father, Graham Miles, and Sarah Lancashire as his stepmother, Mary Jane.

=== Second generation ===
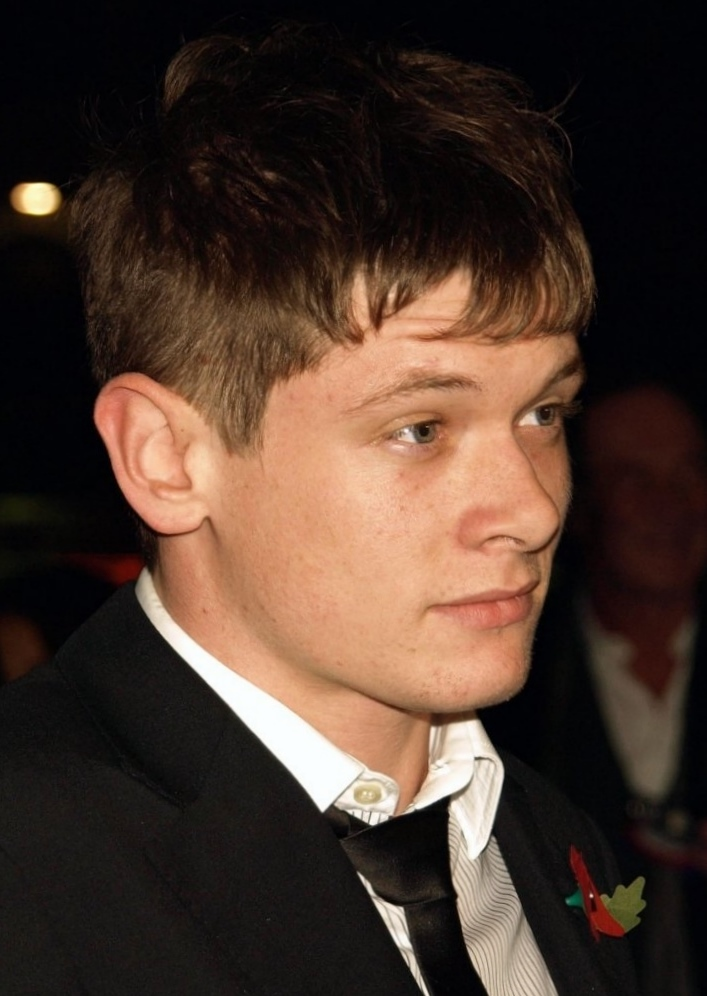
Jack O'Connell, who played James Cook during the second generation

Name	Portrayed by	Notes
Effy Stonem	Kaya Scodelario	Tony's younger sister. Effy is pretty, popular, but also quiet and distant, attempting to keep her own troubles hidden.
Pandora Moon	Lisa Backwell	Effy's best friend. She is innocent to the sexual and narcotic world in which Effy indulges, but is ready and willing to explore it.
Thomas Tomone	Merveille Lukeba	Thomas is an immigrant from the Congo, with a morally upright outlook and good-hearted nature, and his storyline sees him becoming romantically involved with Pandora.
James Cook	Jack O'Connell	In the main male friend group. Charismatic and sociable, he is also boisterous and not afraid of authority. His womanising drives many of the events in the series.
Freddie McClair	Luke Pasqualino	In the main male friend group. An easy-going skater who likes to smoke weed, he is the more sensible and responsible friend and is often put out by Cook's behaviour. Cook and Freddie are both drawn to Effy, which drives a rift in their friendship.
JJ Jones	Ollie Barbieri	In the main male friend group. Has Asperger syndrome, which makes it difficult for him to fit in socially, but he has learnt to use magic tricks to make friends. His friends view him kindly but with a degree of amusement and sometimes irritation.
Katie Fitch	Megan Prescott	Identical twin sisters with Emily. She wants to usurp Effy's place as queen bee of the group, and her homophobic attitudes cause problems between her and Emily.
Emily Fitch	Kathryn Prescott	Identical twin sisters with Katie. The quieter of the two, Emily is used to being in her sister's shadow, and is sulky but perceptive. She tends to not stand out in a crowd due to her insecurities, but later grows out within the show. In love with Naomi, and forms a close friendship with JJ.
Naomi Campbell	Lily Loveless	A fiery, politically charged and passionate young woman with idealistic views and an abundance of ambition. She has feelings for Emily, but questions her sexuality.
Karen McClair	Klariza Clayton	Freddie's younger sister, who is desperate to become famous, alienating him.

As with the first generation, the central cast's parents are played by established British comedic actors. Harry Enfield and Morwenna Banks return as Effy's parents, Jim and Anthea Stonem, with Banks' real life partner David Baddiel appearing as Jim's colleague whom Anthea has an affair with. Sally Phillips acts as Pandora's mother, Angela Moon. Simon Day acts as Freddie's father, Leo McClair. Olivia Colman acts as Naomi's mother, Gina Campbell. Juliet Cowan and Douglas Hodge act as JJ's parents, Celia and Edward Jones. Ronni Ancona and John Bishop act as Katie and Emily's parents, Jenna and Rob Fitch. Matt King and Tanya Franks act as Cook's estranged parents, Cook Sr., and Ruth Byatt. Maureen Lipman also stars as Pandora's auntie, Elizabeth, and Dudley Sutton as Freddie's grandfather, Norman.

=== Third generation ===
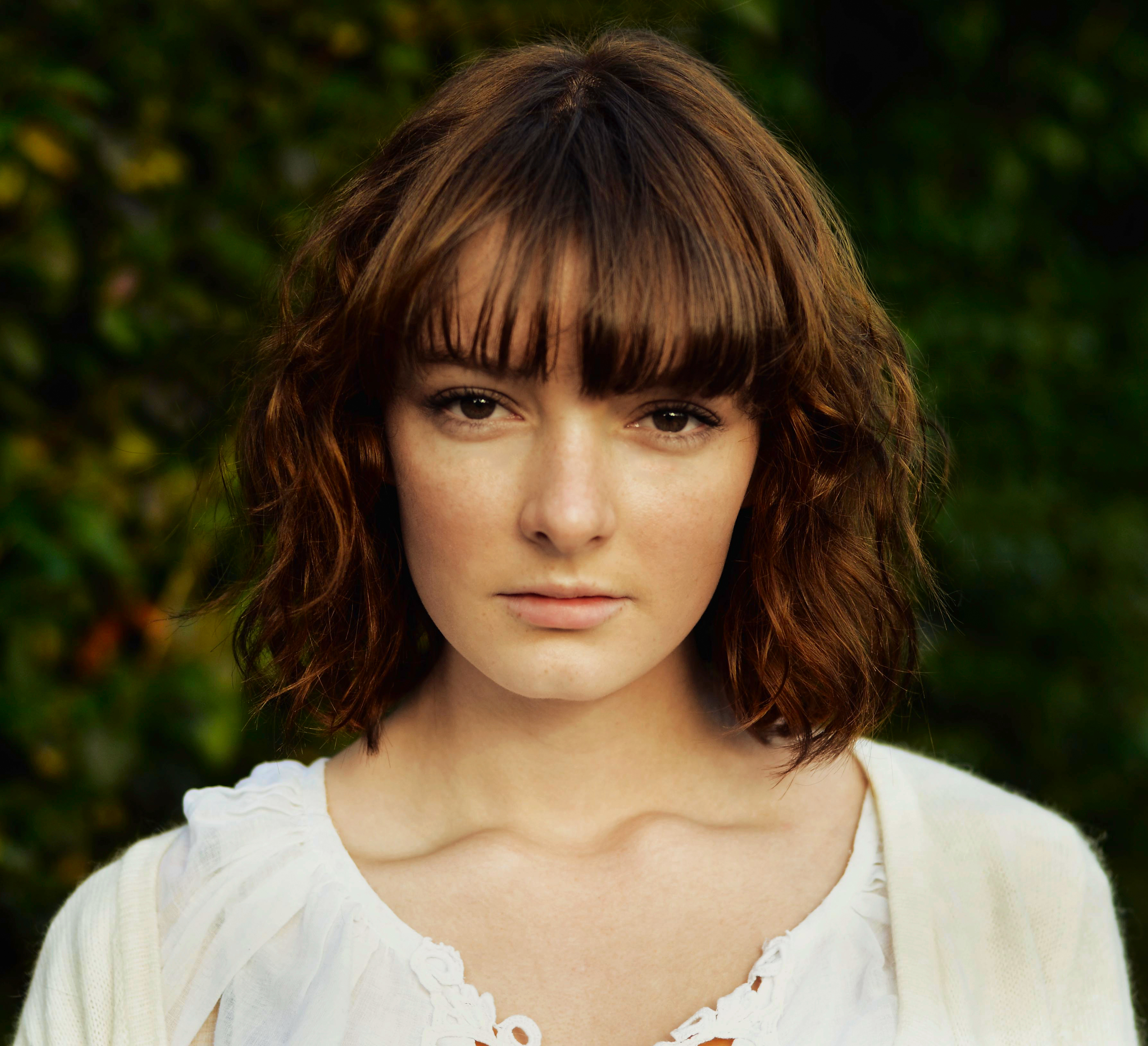
Dakota Blue Richards, who played Franky Fitzgerald during the third generation

Name	Portrayed by	Notes
Franky Fitzgerald	Dakota Blue Richards	Seen as an outsider, having arrived to her first year at Roundview three weeks late upon moving to Bristol from Oxford. She is intelligent and creative, but is seen by others as strange, and is ostracised largely due to her androgynous dress sense.
Alo Creevey	Will Merrick	An optimist, loving his dog and his van foremost. He is best friends with Rich.
Rich Hardbeck	Alexander Arnold	A boy from a very middle-class home who immerses himself in heavy metal subculture. He uses musical elitism as a means to cover up his own shyness when, among other things, interacting with girls.
Mini McGuinness	Freya Mavor	By the time Franky arrives, she already establishes herself as Roundview's new "queen bee". She obscures her own insecurities (such as her body image, and her virginity), and is cruel to Franky and others.
Liv Malone	Laya Lewis	The most party-obsessed, sexually voracious and impulsive of the group, which typically gets her into trouble.
Grace Blood	Jessica Sula	Kind and positive, she disassociates from her friend group with Liv and Mini quickly. Presented as being very prim and proper, she has a crush on Rich.
Nick Levan	Sean Teale	Boyfriend of Mini. His popularity makes him something of a status symbol for Mini, but his feelings for her are shallow and uncomplicated. His brother Matty has strained relationships with his family, engages in criminal behaviour, and lives rough following an altercation with their father.
Matty Levan	Sebastian de Souza	Nick's older brother, who has a mysterious personality and engages in criminal activity. He has feelings for Franky.
Alex Henley	Sam Jackson	Introduced in series 6. A gay male who becomes friends with Liv.

== Episodes ==
Series	Episodes	Originally released	
Series	Episodes	First released	Last released
1	9	25 January 2007	22 March 2007
2	10	11 February 2008	14 April 2008
3	10	22 January 2009	26 March 2009
4	8	28 January 2010	18 March 2010
5	8	27 January 2011	17 March 2011
6	10	23 January 2012	26 March 2012
7	6	1 July 2013	5 August 2013

== Production ==
=== Development ===
Co-creator Bryan Elsley recalls his first conversation with his son Jamie Brittain, soon to be co-creator, which led to the creation of the popular and edgy show. Brittain critiqued many of his father's other ideas for a TV series. He started with the idea that being a teenager co-existed with poor behaviour, casual sex, and experimenting with drugs and alcohol. Most shows with teenagers pretended that these things did not happen especially involving consequences, which this show also lays bare. Elsley has been defending his controversial show for years. His philosophy explored how teenagers believe adults act in corrupted ways, which explains why most adults in the show appear to be crooked, in poor relationships, swearing, and overall poor parents.

=== Writing ===
The show's writing team has an average age of 21, and includes several "teenage consultants". Elsley said, "It's all about the writing. [...] We're about letting our audience feel they are not alone. [...] We're always having people miss [writing] meetings because they've got A-levels or even GCSEs".

In January 2011, Jamie Brittain announced a writing competition open to the public to help with the developing and writing of Series 6. According to Brittain, the winner will receive "a four-month placement in the Skins writers' room, where you'd be invited to attend at least 10 of our top secret meetings, working with [Brittain] and the other Skins writers," as well as monetary compensation. The winners of the 2011 competition were Sophie Boyce (18) and Joe Hampson (21) who ended up staying on in the writers' room for the full duration of Season 6. The winner of the 2008 competition, Dan Lovett, went on to write for episodes in subsequent seasons.

=== Filming ===
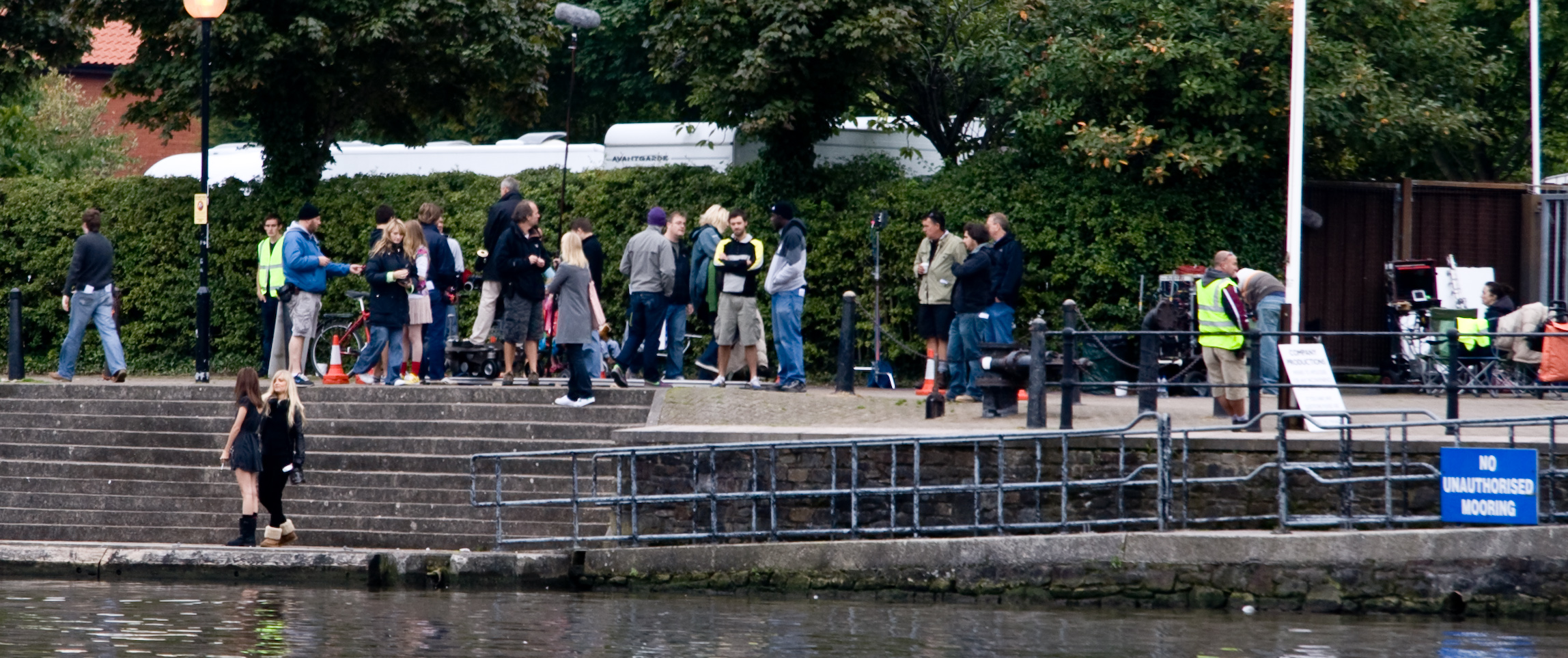
Filming scene from "Pandora" at the Bristol Harbour

The show is filmed almost entirely in Bristol; scenes at Roundview College were shot at Henbury School for series four, having formerly been set at the John Cabot Academy and SGS WISE Campus, and multiple scenes are located around College Green. Special locations for individual episodes have included the Gower Peninsula, Sharpness Docks, the University of Exeter and New York City. The series was shot entirely in High Definition, using Sony HDW-750P cameras for the first two series, and Sony HDW-F900R thereafter, both supplied by Panavision. It was edited by BBC Studios and Post Production in Bristol, using Autodesk Lustre and Autodesk Smoke.

"The trip to Russia" episode was actually shot in Lithuania, near the capital Vilnius. This episode was shot in co-operation with Lithuanian Film Studios and professional Lithuanian actors.

It was announced in April 2008 that all of the original cast (except Kaya Scodelario and Lisa Backwell) would be replaced for series 3. Elsley said: "There are risks associated with dumping a cast, but we just did it. There was some disquiet at the channel, but then they told us just to go with it." Speaking at Broadcast's television drama conference, he also confirmed the show would stick to its pattern of introducing college-age characters, moving them on in the next series, then letting them go. "The first year is about getting to know the kids, and the second gives us the advantage of being able to explore their psyches a little more," said Elsley. Brittain said that the new cast would be quite different from the original characters, although people may still spot some similarities. Open auditions for the second generation of cast members were held in Bristol, which attracted 1,500 16- to 18-year-olds, followed by a further two days of auditions in London.

=== Online content ===
A variety of videos have been released on the Skins website, including character profiles, and "Unseen Skins" mini-episodes that interweave with every aired episode. In addition to character profiles on the official E4 website, accounts for the lead Skins characters were maintained on popular social networking website MySpace. Each series was launched on MySpace, with previews of the first episodes a few days before they are aired on television. After every episode, a tracklist of the soundtrack was released onto the E4 website. There is also an official Skins Internet bot for Windows Live Messenger, which allows users to receive automated messages throughout the airing of each episode with music credits, trivia, and behind-the-scenes gossip.

== Reception ==
=== Critical reception ===
The first series received positive reviews, although some critics complained that the series depicts teenagers unrealistically and stereotypically. Others criticised the excessive promotion of the show (specifically in the UK) and having relatively mediocre writing in comparison to other similarly themed shows. The use of portrayal of sex, profanity, and explicit drug use in the first few episodes garnered criticism. Actor Nicholas Hoult defended the extreme storylines, saying they would not reflect "everyone's teenage life", adding "it is maybe heightened for entertainment but all of it is believable."

Marieke Hardy expressed admiration for the show, and particularly enjoyed the fact that the show was "beautiful and sad and poignant and perfectly hurtful", while also managing to be at once "edgy, funny and rude". However, she did state that she was unsure whether the show was meant for teenagers or not. Rebecca Nicholson in a review for The Guardian praised the show's balance in showing "hedonism with consequences, the comedy with tragedy" and criticised those who "Slammed it for being irresponsible" to have "missed the point". Stewart Lee has remarked during an interview on the BBC4 programme Charlie Brooker's Screenwipe that he feels lucky for having been a teenager watching TV for teenagers in the 1970s and not the 2000s as "there was something really comforting for nerds and weirdos about programmes like Children of the Stones and The Changes." He said that watching Skins as a teenager today would make him feel lonelier than he already would have been. However, Brooker himself gave the programme a positive review in his Guardian column "Screen Burn", and specifically stated that "the series had wrong-footed me", comparing his initial expectation of Skins as a shallow show to after he had finished watching the series. Caroline Preece wrote that "The genius of that first season was its disguise."

In his book Doctor Who: The Writer's Tale, Russell T Davies and his co-author, Benjamin Cook, discuss Skins at length, with Davies praising the show's innovation in a genre that was fast becoming tired and out of date. They are critical of some elements of the first series, such as the believability of Tony's character, or episode 6 which is described as "Carry On Russia", but give high praise to the second series as a whole, highlighting the death of Sid's dad as a superb moment, and calling the finale "perfect". Davies, creator of the award-winning Queer as Folk, also praised the handling of the show's homosexuality-related storylines, saying that he knew a boy very like Maxxie in the 1980s. The Age called it a "refreshing, entertaining and worthy series" and wrote it was "compulsory viewing for parents of teenagers as much as for teens." Similarly, the "Naomily" storyline of Series 3 and 4 proved popular with lesbian viewers; a poll conducted by American lesbians' media website AfterEllen.com ranked Naomi and Emily as the top two fictional lesbian and bisexual characters.

=== Television ratings ===
The pilot episode of Skins averaged 1.5 million viewers. The ratings for the second series which launched peaked at 884,000 viewers, which gave it 5.9% audience share and taking 60% of the 16–24 demographic; however this was still more than 500,000 viewers down on its series one premiere. The series finale attracted an audience of 740,000 on E4, equating to a 4.65% share of the audience. The start of the third series drew in 877,000 viewers, proving popular with its key audience demographic of younger people—56.2% of viewers were aged between 16 and 34. Series 4 premiered with 1.5 million viewers across E4 and E4+1, the highest rated episode since series 1.

=== Cultural influence ===
The programme has given rise to the term "Skins party", referring to a debauched night of heavy drinking and recreational drug use. During the 2007 Easter holidays, a girl in County Durham threw a house party; it was advertised on her Myspace profile as "Skins Unofficial Party", referring to the party in the first series' trailer, with the subtitle "Let's trash the average family-sized house disco party." Two hundred people turned up, breaking into the house and causing over £20,000 of seemingly deliberate damage. She claimed that her account was hacked and someone else placed the ad.

Similar incidents have taken place in Ireland, with major household damage and theft of personal property being reported in Firhouse, Bray and Drogheda. Although these attacks have not been conclusively linked to the show, news outlets have reported that they are called Skins parties. Club nights marketed as "Skins Secret Parties" have also taken shape in Leicester and Brighton. Following this, a series of parties were run by Company Pictures in spring 2008.

In a ten-year retrospective, Rebecca Nicholson noted that Skins transitioned teen dramas from stories of luxury to more frank and gritty depictions of "what young viewers might want and aspire to by actually thinking about and consulting young viewers." Caroline Preece shared a similar sentiment in her retrospective, calling the show's casting and use of online marketing as indicative of it being a "trailblazer". Its dark and realistic portrayal of mental illness influenced shows to depict it similarly.

The characters of Cassie and Effy were influential to young audiences, with many young female viewers praising the impact of Cassie representing them and their struggles. Cassie has, however, been criticised for being an extreme example, causing some to feel disingenuous in their struggles with anorexia. Both characters have been said to trigger eating disorders in those trying to replicate their look and behaviour. Cassie, who became a poster child for eating disorders, has also been linked to pro-ana media although there was still vocal opposition to pro-ana sentiments from fans of her. Effy had a particular popularity on the blogging site Tumblr where blogs dedicated to the character could be found. Samuel Rosenberg of The Michigan Daily criticised this subcommunity for "[reframing] the instability of Effy's [life] into something attractive and exciting through which people can live vicariously." The show as a whole has been embraced by communities dedicated to depression and anxiety on Tumblr. In 2020, it saw a resurgence among Gen Z audiences after popular TikTok users took fashion inspiration from and made videos about Effy.

=== Awards and nominations ===
Year	Award	Category	Nominee(s)	Work	Result
2007	Royal Television Society Craft & Design Awards	Best Production Design - Drama	Amelia Shankland	"Cassie"	Won
2007	Royal Television Society Craft & Design Awards	Graphic Design - Titles	Tal Rosner	Series 1	Nominated
2007	Royal Television Society Craft & Design Awards	Best Photography - Drama	Nick Dance	Series 1	Nominated
2008	Rose d'Or Awards	Best Drama	Bryan Elsley, Charles Pattinson, George Faber, John Griffin, John Yorke, Chris Clough, Matt Stevens	Series 1	Won
2008	Royal Television Society Craft & Design Awards	Costume Design - Drama	Edward K, Gibbon	Series 1	Nominated
2008	British Academy Television Awards	Best Drama Series	Bryan Elsley, Charles Pattinson, George Faber, John Griffin, John Yorke, Chris Clough, Matt Stevens	Series 1	Nominated
2008	British Academy Television Craft Awards	Best Title Sequence	Tal Rosner	Series 1	Nominated
2008	British Academy Television Craft Awards	Best Photography and Lighting	Nick Dance	Series 1	Nominated
2008	British Academy Television Craft Awards	Breakthrough Talent	Writing Team	Series 1	Nominated
2008	British Academy Television Craft Awards	Interactive Innovation - Content	Peter Spiers, Lindsay Nuttall	Series 1	Won
2008	MediaGuardian Awards for Innovation	Best Advertising Campaign	4Creative, Holler, Naked Communications	Series 1	Won
2008	Interactive Marketing and Advertising Awards	Entertainment	4Creative, Holler, Naked Communications	Series 2	Won
2009	British Academy Television Awards	Philips Audience Award	Skins	Series 2	Won
2009	Switch Live Awards	Best TV Series	Skins	Series 2	Won
2010	GLAAD Media Award	Outstanding Drama Series	Skins	Series 4	Nominated
2011	NME Awards	Best TV Show	Skins	Series 5	Won

== DVD releases ==
Series	Release dates			Ep #	Additional information
Series	Region 1	Region 2	Region 4	Ep #	Additional information
1	13 January 2009	24 September 2007	20 February 2008	9	This three-disc box set includes all nine episodes from series one. Bonus features include nine unaired online-only Unseen Skins episodes, the music video for "Standing in the Way of Control", and extended trailers. Much of the popular music used in the original broadcasts is not found on this DVD due to the high cost of licensing. Of particular note to R1 audiences is that the cast ensemble performance of "Wild World" that appeared at the end of the series is completely missing from the release.
2	14 April 2009	5 May 2008	20 August 2008	10	This three-disc box set includes all ten episodes from series two. Bonus features include the six accompanying Unseen Skins episodes, interviews with cast and crew, and short behind the scenes documentaries. Much of the popular music used in the original broadcasts is not found on this DVD due to the high cost of licensing.
3	7 September 2010	6 April 2009	9 September 2009	10	This three-disc box set includes all ten episodes from series three. Bonus features include four editions of Unseen Skins, ten character video diaries, and behind the scenes featurettes from the episodes, trailers and auditions. Much of the popular music used in the original broadcasts is not found on this DVD due to the high cost of licensing.
4	11 January 2011	22 March 2010	18 August 2010	8	This three-disc box set includes all eight episodes from series four. Bonus features include Unseen Skins episodes, animated feature, behind the scenes videos, and commentaries with the show's writers and directors.
5	N/A	21 March 2011	30 November 2011	8	This three-disc box set includes all eight episodes from series five, behind-the-scenes of the entire series, and audio commentaries of writers, directors and actors (Alexander Arnold) of episode 2 and episode 6.
6	N/A	23 April 2012	3 July 2013	10	This box set includes all episodes from series six.
7	N/A	12 August 2013	6 November 2013	6	This box set includes all episodes from series seven.
1–7	N/A	12 August 2013	6 November 2013	61	This box set includes all episodes from series one to seven.

== Other media ==
In May 2009, E4 confirmed that Film4 and Company Pictures were in "preliminary talks" about a movie spin-off. In March 2010, Jack Thorne revealed to The Guardian that the Skins motion picture was in pre-production.

On 31 May 2011, after many whisperings about whether the movie would go ahead or not, Kaya Scodelario announced on Twitter "I genuinely don't know anything about that, have no idea if it's even happening." Scodelario continued by saying, "I would still love to do the Skins movie" and that she would enjoy working with the cast again.

In September 2009, Company Pictures announced that the Skins brand has been licensed to Crystal Entertainment. The plan is to help creator Bryan Elsley expand the brand into areas such as film, fashion and music. They described Skins as "the most authentic teen brand on TV".

In January 2010, Hodder & Stoughton published Skins: The Novel, a short novel by Ali Cronin that describes events taking place between series 3 and 4. In March 2011, they published Skins: v. 2: Summer Holiday, a short novel by Jess Brittain which centres around the series 5 cast.

== American remake ==
Although Skins aired in the United States on BBC America (only series 1–3 aired and the rights cleared only for those series for purchase of DVDs or online viewing in the US), albeit in a heavily censored form (strong language bleeped out and some more graphic scenes of violence and sex cut out), MTV announced that they would be adapting the show into an American version set in Baltimore, Maryland. With Bryan Elsley as executive producer, the series began filming in February 2010 in Toronto, Ontario, Canada.

The first episode of the American series is almost a shot-for-shot copy of the first episode of the British series, but it deviates from the original plot in following episodes such that there are significant differences between the American and British versions. Characters are also similar, and some names have been changed; Sid has been renamed Stanley, Cassie renamed Cadie and Jal renamed Daisy. In addition, Tony's younger sister Effy, who becomes a main character in Generation Two of British Skins, was renamed Eura. However, the biggest change comes in the form of Tea, a lesbian cheerleader who replaces the British gay character Maxxie who was a professional dancer.

The show's cancellation was announced by MTV on 10 June 2011. The Parents Television Council, an advocacy group, criticised the show, calling it one of the worst shows a child could watch. Reasons cited for its cancellation included loss of advertising sponsors and a shrinking audience, with fewer people tuning in for each subsequent episode. Pre-adult teens ("minors" under American law), who are MTV's core demographic audience, were at the centre of the argument for those who disapproved of the program, even with MTV's self-imposed restrictive broadcaster-like standards and practices.

== See also ==
- Euphoria, an Israeli miniseries that was inspired in part by Skins
- Misfits
- The Inbetweeners
- Kids
