= Franky (Skins series 5) =

- Skins episode
- Episode no.: Series 5 Episode 1
- Directed by: Amanda Boyle
- Written by: Sean Buckley
- Original air date: 27 January 2011

Guest appearances
- Chris Addison as David Blood; John Sessions as Geoff; Gareth Farr as Jeff; Giles Thomas as Doug; Gordon Kennedy as Alan Precopp

Episode chronology
← Previous "Everyone"	Next → "Rich"
- Skins (series 5)

"Franky" is the first episode of the fifth series of the British teen drama Skins. It first aired on E4 in the UK on 27 January 2011. It introduces the third generation of the series, and focuses on the character of Franky Fitzgerald (Dakota Blue Richards) she attempts to fit in at Roundview College, after moving to Bristol from Oxford with her adoptive gay dads.

== Plot synopsis ==
The episode opens with Franky Fitzgerald, a timid androgynous teenager who has recently moved to Bristol from Oxford, along with her adoptive fathers, Geoff and Jeff, preparing for school. On her way to school she becomes involved in an accident with a motorized scooter. This is witnessed by Mini (Freya Mavor), an attractive but arrogant and fashion-oriented girl with two best friends, Liv (Laya Lewis) and Grace (Jessica Sula). During sports, Franky accidentally trips Mini, causing her to fall into a patch of mud. Enraged, Mini drags Franky down with her, and their fight is eventually broken up. Later at lunch, Franky is approached by two other outcasts in the school, farmer's son Alo (Will Merrick), and metalhead Rich (Alexander Arnold) who have seen her, and hope to make friends. They are, however, chased off by Mini and her two friends, who hope to make a new start. They invite her to hang out. Franky coldly refuses, and locks herself in the bathroom missing her English class. However, they find Franky in town later, and she decides she has changed her mind.

At the local shopping centre, they discover that Franky has never used makeup before, and persuade her to try it for the first time. Later, Mini invites Franky to a party she is holding, but informs her she will need to find better clothes. So Mini finds Franky a dress, and Grace shoplifts makeup. After an escape, Franky returns home with Mini and her friends, and introduces them to her dads. Later, Mini discovers some humiliating pictures of Franky on "Friendlook", discovering that she was bullied mercilessly at her old school. Franky's father, Jeff, discovers them and scolds them for looking at the pictures, and Franky, upon discovering, is distraught, and storms off. The next day, Franky has an argument with Mini after she shuns the dress she bought her, and calls her a "bulimic barbie," offending Mini. After English class, she discovers that the pictures Mini and her friends saw have been placed on the walls of the school by Nick Levan (Sean Teale), Mini's rugby player boyfriend.

Franky heads to a secluded area of the city and shoots at an old fridge with a replica revolver she owns and smokes a joint. Suddenly, she is approached by a mysterious young man named Matty (Sebastian De Souza), though he does not reveal this. She tearfully begs him to leave, but before he does, he tells her that she is beautiful. At home, she is shocked to find Grace, Mini's eccentric friend, who had shown a genuine interest in her from the beginning, in her room, and informs her that she and Liv had genuinely enjoyed her company. Out of anger, Franky burns the dress Mini made her get, before going to Mini's party. There, Mini is horrified to see her, calls her names and demands she leaves. Before she does leave, however, Franky implores Grace and Liv to admit that they enjoyed their time with her, though the latter can only give a nervous shrug. Grace follows her, and recruits Alo and Rich to chase Franky in Alo's van. They catch up to her, and Rich grabs hold of her and takes her into the van. The four then head to a local swimming pool. There, they have some fun in the pool, united as a gang of their own, and Franky has finally found some true friends.

== Reception ==
The episode premiered with 820,000 viewers, down from the 1.1 million for the series 4 premiere.

Critical reaction to the premiere was positive. In a review, The Guardian hailed the series premiere as, "a return to the hedonistic feel of the original series." And continued with, "Series five could make a simply very good television series once again.". Meanwhile, Metro gave the premiere an "A" and boasted about the soundtrack, stating, "in Skins the soundtrack doesn’t just mumble away in the background, it’s an extra character." However, that same publication also noted that fan reaction to the episode was mixed to negative, with the lack of characters from the previous generations being cited as a main complaint. The Mirror wrote positively of the premiere.
