= Skins series 5 =

5th series of the British television show Skins

Skins
- Season 5
- DVD cover art for the fifth series of Skins
- Starring: Alexander Arnold; Sebastian de Souza; Laya Lewis; Freya Mavor; Will Merrick; Dakota Blue Richards; Jessica Sula; Sean Teale
- No. of episodes: 8

Release
- Original network: E4
- Original release: 27 January – 17 March 2011

Season chronology
- ← Previous; Series 4 Next → Series 6

Skins is a British teen drama created by father-and-son television writers Bryan Elsley and Jamie Brittain for Company Pictures. The fifth series began airing on E4 on 27 January 2011 and ended on 17 March 2011. This series sees the introduction of a new cast; it follows the lives of the third generation of sixth form students of Franky Fitzgerald, Rich Hardbeck, Grace Blood, Mini McGuinness, Liv Malone, Alo Creevey, and brothers Nick and Matty Levan.

== Main cast ==
Actor	Role	Episodes
Dakota Blue Richards	Franky Fitzgerald	All
Alexander Arnold	Rich Hardbeck	All
Freya Mavor	Mini McGuinness	All
Laya Lewis	Liv Malone	All
Will Merrick	Alo Creevey	All
Sean Teale	Nick Levan	All
Jessica Sula	Grace Blood	All
Sebastian de Souza	Matty Levan	7

== List of episodes ==
No. overall	No. in series	Title	Featured character(s)	Directed by	Written by	Original release date	UK viewers (millions)
38	1	"Franky"	Franky Fitzgerald	Amanda Boyle	Sean Buckley	27 January 2011	1.03
Franky starts at Roundview and is determined not to be a loner. Things seem to be going well until she accidentally challenges Mini's position as queen bee, and when she doesn't conform to Mini's expectations, she's spat out. Franky then meets Matty, who understands and empowers her, giving her the strength to stand up to Mini. Grace admires Franky, and a new gang is formed, with Alo, Rich and Grace. Franky has finally found friends, but in doing so has started a war with Mini. Note: This episode marks the first appearances of Franky, Rich, Alo, Mini, Liv, Grace, Nick and Matty.
39	2	"Rich"	Rich Hardbeck	Philippa Langdale	Jamie Brittain	3 February 2011	0.72
Rich uses his taste in extreme music to keep the world, and especially girls, at bay. But when Alo finds Rich the perfect woman, he is forced into pairing up with Grace to learn how to chat up girls. Grace has to learn the ways of metal in order to impersonate a metal chick, but Rich doesn't make it easy, refusing to believe a mainstream girl could understand him. Eventually Rich appreciates the meaning of compromise and allows Grace into his world, but heartbreak isn't far away... Note: Matty is absent from this episode.
40	3	"Mini"	Mini McGuinness	Philippa Langdale	Georgia Lester	10 February 2011	0.741
Mini is feeling under threat when Grace brings Franky to the charity fashion show - she ends up sacking them both. Despite appearances, Mini's relationship with Nick is also rocky. While Mini struggles to maintain control, Liv acts in the worst way possible.
41	4	"Liv"	Liv Malone	Amanda Boyle	Ed Hime	17 February 2011	0.661
Mini befriends the gang in order to isolate Liv, who is still having a scene with Nick. Liv then hooks up with a guy called Matty and they spend some time escaping reality, finding themselves in a costume emporium where Liv is attacked. Matty hits the owner of the shop over the head, steals the surveillance tape and money from the cash register, and flees. Matty and Liv have sex on the roof of a club and head back to her place, promising to leave that day together. When they arrive at Liv's house, they discover that Matty and Nick are brothers. This reveals Liv's affair in front of Mini, changing their friendship forever.
42	5	"Nick"	Nick Levan	Jack Clough	Geoff Bussetil	24 February 2011	0.574
Nick is the star of the school - on the surface he seems to have everything. But Matty's reappearance has unsettled him and as he watches Matty slip effortlessly into new friendships, old wounds are re-opened. Nick realises that everything he thought he wanted - the approval of his father and the rugby success - is crushing him.
43	6	"Alo"	Alo Creevey	Jack Clough	Daniel Lovett	3 March 2011	0.588
Fed up with his boring life on Creevey Farm, Alo goes to the city to seriously party and try to get laid. Meanwhile his parents, fed up with his behaviour, remove him from college in an attempt to force him to buckle down on the farm. But Alo rebels and hosts a party that ruins the farm. He hopes that this will show his parents that they can't keep him trapped there, but when his dad is hospitalised he finally sees it's time to grow up.
44	7	"Grace"	Grace Blood	Dominic Leclerc	Jamie Brittain	10 March 2011	0.486
Grace has always believed in fairytales and happy endings, but she is forced to face reality when Rich meets her father, who instantly disapproves and threatens to send her back to Mayberry's College for Young Ladies if her grades drop. Grace has to pass her drama exam, but with her relationship in turmoil and the whole gang at odds in her production of Twelfth Night, it's not looking likely. When Grace manages to pull it off, her father goes back on his word, sending her to Mayberry's anyway. However, Rich rescues her, climbing up to her room and proposing - her own real-life Romeo!
45	8	"Everyone"	Everyone	Dominic Leclerc	Sean Buckley	17 March 2011	0.494
It's the day of Rich and Grace's wedding, and the gang are pulling together for the happy couple. But with shambolic Alo as best man, it's no surprise that they run into trouble and become separated in the wilds of Somerset. Will they make it to the church on time? And will they still be friends by the end?
