= Skins series 6 =

6th series of the British television show Skins

Skins
- Season 6
- DVD cover art for the sixth series of Skins
- Starring: Alexander Arnold; Sebastian de Souza; Sam Jackson; Laya Lewis; Freya Mavor; Will Merrick; Dakota Blue Richards; Jessica Sula; Sean Teale
- No. of episodes: 10

Release
- Original network: E4
- Original release: 23 January – 26 March 2012

Season chronology
- ← Previous; Series 5 Next → Series 7

Skins is a British teen drama created by father-and-son television writers Bryan Elsley and Jamie Brittain for Company Pictures. The sixth series began airing on E4 on 23 January 2012 and ended on 26 March 2012. Like the previous series, it follows the lives of the third generation of characters, which consists of Franky Fitzgerald, Rich Hardbeck, Grace Blood, Mini McGuinness, Liv Malone, Alo Creevey, brothers Nick and Matty Levan, and new character Alex Henley.

== Main cast ==
Actor	Role	Episodes
Dakota Blue Richards	Franky Fitzgerald	All
Alexander Arnold	Rich Hardbeck	8
Freya Mavor	Mini McGuinness	All
Laya Lewis	Liv Malone	All
Will Merrick	Alo Creevey	All
Sean Teale	Nick Levan	All
Jessica Sula	Grace Blood	6
Sebastian de Souza	Matty Levan	7
Sam Jackson	Alex Henley	8

== List of episodes ==
No. overall	No. in series	Title	Featured character(s)	Directed by	Written by	Original release date	UK viewers (millions)
46	1	"Everyone"	Everyone	Jack Clough	Bryan Elsley	23 January 2012	1.032
The gang return in style burning their way through a holiday in Morocco, but what begins as a hedonistic trip turns into a living hell. By the time they return to Bristol, everything has changed...
47	2	"Rich"	Rich Hardbeck	Sam Donovan	Daniel Lovett	30 January 2012	0.655
Professor David Blood has banned Rich from visiting Grace in hospital and Rich is suffering. Alo tries to keep him out of trouble with a band practice, but Rich is committed to his love and he stands outside the hospital waiting for Grace's call. Eventually the call comes and Rich finds a way past security and breaks into Grace's room. The lovers are reunited, but they have a problem as Blood is moving Grace to another hospital in Switzerland. Rich goes to Grace's house to appeal to Professor Blood, but finds they've already gone. Rich moves into the house, sleeping in Grace's room until Alo tracks him down and pledges to help his best mate, but Alo has other things on his mind and cracks begin to develop in the boys' friendship. It falls to Liv to bring the fractured group back together again. Note: Matty is absent from this episode.
48	3	"Alex"	Alex Henley	Sam Donovan	Jack Lothian	6 February 2012	0.720
Alex lives with his grandmother, who has dementia. At school, he catches the eye of Liv. Alex randomly punches Alo in the face, but apologizes. Liv confronts Mini about her behaviour and the two argue. Alex watches the argument, Liv confronts him, and the two have a conversation. He kiss her. She slaps him, and they introduce themselves. Liv goes to Alex's house and meets his grandmother. Liv leaves and Alex reads to his grandmother. He goes to the pub with the rest of the group. The gang is wary and hostile towards Alex. Mini downs shots and dances with a boy. Alex is followed by Liv and they go play poker. Alex wins a large amount of money, but cheated and they grab the money and run. Alex and Liv part. Alex uses an app for finding people for sex and has sex with a man. He and Liv break into a house which is messy. The two clean it. Liv comes on to Alex and he starts to tell her something, only to be interrupted by the owner and they flee. They return to Alex's house where they find his father packing Alex's grandmother's things. His father tells Alex to finish and leaves. Alex is upset, but he dances with his grandmother and Liv. It is announced that there will be a memorial for Grace. Liv is disgusted that people who didn't know Grace will attend and is adamant that the friends not attend. Mini and Liv argue and Liv rushes off crying. She is followed by Alex and kisses him. Alex tells her he's gay. Liv becomes angry and Alex explains that he's never had friends. Liv tells him they're not friends. Alex runs home and discovers that his grandmother has committed suicide. Liv, Mini, and Franky attend Grace's memorial and smash things and scream at students. Liv receives a call from Alex, who apologizes. He takes the group out on a sail boat, where he encourages Liv to talk to Mini, which she does, but Mini pushes Liv away. Mini discovers a trunk with Alex's dead grandmother inside. The gang question Alex about it and he explains that she didn't want to go where others wanted her and pleads to the others to help bury her at sea. They slide the coffin into the ocean. Alex and Liv kiss platonicly and agree to be friends. They jump off the boat and swim away. Note: This episode marks the first appearance of Alex. Rich and Grace are absent from this episode.
49	4	"Franky"	Franky Fitzgerald	Ian Barnes	Sean Buckley	13 February 2012	0.741
Franky is in a bad place - it's the week of her mock exams and she's unable to concentrate on her studies. Her friends are avoiding her, parental support makes her feel smothered and in her isolation she feels propelled towards Luke. He's bad news, but she feels as if he's the only person who understands her and she's intoxicated by him. Drawn into Luke's dangerous world, she finds an outlet for her anger and frustration. Burning bridges with family and friends, Franky is in more trouble than ever before. But help comes in unlikely forms, and out of the darkness a new friendship is born. Note: Rich is absent from this episode.
50	5	"Mini"	Mini McGuinness	Ian Barnes	Jess Brittain	20 February 2012	0.661
Mini hates her mum's pervy new live-in boyfriend, and to make matters worse, Alo has broken the rules of their 'no strings attached' secret relationship and declared his love for her. Mini feels trapped; she's lost control of her life and needs to get away. Ignoring advice from her mum and Liv, she seeks refuge with her dad. Gregory's never been around that much, but promises it'll be different this time. He sweeps Mini into his glamorous and grown-up world where she feels a million miles away from her problems, but Mini has a bigger problem that she can't run away from and will ultimately have to face on her own. Note: Matty and Grace are absent from this episode.
51	6	"Nick"	Nick Levan	Jack Clough	Geoff Bussetil	27 February 2012	0.574
Nick is desperately in love with Franky, but it's a one-way street. He has no choice but to accept Franky as his friend and nothing more, while his love for her grows with each passing day. Then Matty gets in touch - he's still in love with Franky and needs Nick's help to get him out of Morocco and back to Bristol. Ever loyal, Nick tries to put his feelings for Franky aside and agrees to help his brother. Torn between his love for Franky, his loyalty to Matty and his fear of confrontation, Nick's life begins to spin wildly out of control until he has no choice but to step up and discover what he's truly capable of. Note: Grace is absent from this episode.
52	7	"Alo"	Alo Creevey	Benjamin Caron	Laura Hunter	5 March 2012	0.588
Alo still has no idea that Mini is carrying his baby. Fed up of trying to get back to the fun times they used to have, he attempts to get over Mini by hooking up with a new girl, Poppy Champion. She's perfect for Alo and Mini is soon a distant memory. Franky's attempts to make him see sense fall on deaf ears, but Alo's childish choices come back to haunt him and he's soon out of his depth. In a lot of trouble and with nobody to turn to, the boy who stubbornly refused to grow up may have finally run out of time... Note: Matty and Grace are absent from this episode.
53	8	"Liv"	Liv Malone	Benjamin Caron	Ben Bond & Bryan Elsley	12 March 2012	0.486
Liv has been partying with her new best friend Alex ever since he arrived in Bristol. But then he disappears for a dirty weekend just when Liv needs him most. She reaches out to her friends, but finds she is excluded from their lives. With nobody to turn to in her hour of need, Liv is forced to face up to the choices she's made and isn't quite as strong as she believed.
54	9	"Mini and Franky"	Mini McGuinness and Franky Fitzgerald	Ian Barnes	Jess Brittain	19 March 2012	0.494
Mini and Franky are still holed up in Mini's bedroom, but with Matty back in Bristol and Mini's ever-growing baby bump, time is quickly running out for the girls. Things come to a head when Mini's health takes a turn for the worse, leaving them isolated and under pressure from family and friends.
55	10	"Finale"	Everyone	Benjamin Caron	Georgia Lester	26 March 2012	0.574
It's the end of an era. The exam results are in and Alex is throwing the mother of all leaving parties. Everyone's future hangs in the balance as Franky struggles to confront her past. The group is still in pieces following Grace's death... and time is running out for them to make things right. Note: This episode marks the final appearances of Franky, Rich, Alo, Mini, Liv, Nick, Matty, Alex and Grace.
