= Nick (Skins series 5) =

- Skins episode
- Episode no.: Season 5 Episode 5
- Directed by: Jack Clough
- Written by: Geoff Bussetil
- Original air date: 24 February 2011

Guest appearances
- Chris Addison as David Blood; Alistair McGowan as Coach Pooter; Dorian Lough as Leon Levan; Emma Stansfield as Pamela

Episode chronology
← Previous "Liv"	Next → "Alo"

"Nick" is the fifth episode of fifth series of the British teen drama Skins, which first aired on 24 February 2011 on E4. It focuses on Nick (Sean Teale) as he deals with the return of his brother, Matty (Sebastian De Souza) into his life.

== Synopsis ==
The episode opens with Nick and his rugby team training for a big game coming up. At home, Nick's overbearing father, Leon makes Matty sign a contract, if he hopes to stay, before leaving to take his suicidal friend, Warren, for a game of golf. Tensions soon arise over Matty's relationship with Liv, as Nick is still secretly in love with her. When Liv arrives to have sex with Matty, Nick gets jealous and immediately goes to Mini's house, where they awkwardly have sex.

The next day, Nick and Leon accompany Matty to a meeting with David Blood, the Roundview College headmaster, and manage to get him re-enrolled. Nick is ordered by his father to keep an eye on his older brother. Nick then introduces Matty to the gang, and Matty immediately recognises Franky from their earlier encounter. He wastes no time in settling in with the gang, and a slightly jealous Nick goes to get changed for practice. In the changing room, Ryder unknowingly insults Matty and Liv, prompting Nick to angrily push him up against a wall. He carries his anger onto the field, and violently tackles Ryder, even though he didn't have the ball. Later on, he is given some stress-relieving therapy by Coach Pooter, his wise, South African rugby coach, who, through his massage skills, compares him to "a depressing book about an anxious young man who's worrying about a girl," suggesting that Nick is jealous about his brother's relationship with Liv. Afterwards, Nick goes to a party with the gang. There, they try to think of a good partner for Alo, and Nick suggests Franky. Matty agrees with him in order to get a response out of Franky, prompting Franky and Matty to share a knowing look. Liv then disappears off to the bar, and Nick follows, and tries to talk to Liv, but she coldly refuses to talk about their own relationship. Nick stays and drinks shots. Feeling abandoned, Mini calls Ryder, and Nick returns to find him dancing with her. In his fury, Nick punches Ryder in the face, breaking his nose, and both Liv and Mini angrily confront him, and he storms off. At the nearby rugby pitch, Matty finds Nick trying to practice, and play a one-on-one game of rugby. However, Nick gets frustrated and assaults Matty, claiming that he gets everything handed to him, and has ruined his life.

Nick returns home to discover his father going to give a statement to the police, because his friend, Warren, has committed suicide. He stubbornly refuses to listen to Nick's problems, and a frustrated Nick vents his fury by taking one of his father's golf clubs and smashing up the kitchen. Matty arrives to discover him doing it, and orders him to leave. The next day, Nick attempts to talk to Liv, but in his efforts, falls off a wheelie bin and injures himself. Liv coldly refuses to speak to him. Wandering off, he meets a woman named Pamela, and introduces himself as "Matty." Feeling sympathetic, she gives him some drugs and then entices him to have sex with her. Later on, he is sitting on a swing near Franky's house, when Franky joins him. Nick sadly tells her everything on his mind, and she sympathetically informs him "you're not a complete dick." Nick proceeds to his rugby changing room to tell Coach Pooter he is quitting. The coach accepts his decision, but is unimpressed to learn he is also planning on running away from home, and firmly informs him that this is not the best course of action, using Nelson Mandela as an example. Nick then returns home, to discover Matty has tried to take the rap for Nick's actions. Nick immediately orders him to stay, and stands up to his father. He tells his father that he is the reason his sons act the way they do. Matty joins in.

The episode ends with Nick and Matty burning all of their motivational books, posters, and Matty's contract, and sharing a beer. Their father looks on from his room.
