= Alo (Skins series 5) =

- Skins episode
- Episode no.: Series 5 Episode 6
- Directed by: Jack Clough
- Written by: Daniel Lovett
- Original air date: 3 March 2011

Guest appearances
- Chris Addison as David Blood; Dave Hill (actor) as Dewi; Ingrid Lacey as Catherine; Peter Gunn (actor) as Owen

Episode chronology
| ← Previous "Nick" | Next → "Grace" |
- Skins (series 5)

"Alo" is the sixth episode of fifth series of the British teen drama Skins, which first aired on 3 March 2011 on E4. It focuses on Aloysius "Alo" Creevey (Will Merrick) as he deals with the consequences of refusing to grow up, and his efforts to stand up to his domineering and tyrannical mother and henpecked father.

== Synopsis ==
It is Alo's birthday, and his domineering mother and henpecked father seem disinterested. Rather than allowing him to visit his friends in town, they force him to stay and work on the farm. His father and their incoherent farmhand try to teach him how to drive a tractor, but he overheats it. While his father is trying to fix it, he lets Alo run off. His mother, however, discovers what has happened, and reveals that they intend to withdraw him from Roundview College in order to force him to buckle down on the farm. He is lured away by his friends and taken to the local pub, where they demand to know what has happened. After he explains, they encourage him to stand up to his parents and "stick it to the man." His parents soon arrive and drag him off. Later, on the farm, when trying to move a particularly stubborn rock, his father tells him to leave it; Alo exclaims sarcastically that "things are fine as they are, aren't they?" Although given a list of tasks, Alo instead hides in Bessy, the cow's stable. He accidentally drops his burning spliff onto a tank of propane, blowing up part of the stable and Bessy. His mother and father take everything he owns, including his van and beloved dog, Rags, to be sold. Despite his pleas, they won't listen.

Burning with rage and finally reaching his limit, he fills condoms with the farm's entire egg and flour produce, and invites the gang over for an egg and flour fight. With the entire farm's produce destroyed, they call most of the college round to Alo's farm for an impromptu party, which Alo hopes will trash the farmhouse. During the party, Mini meets Franky on the couch, and reveals for the first time that she is aware that Franky is in love with Matty. She encourages her to make a move on him, saying "Liv'll do it to you in a heartbeat." Franky, suspecting that Mini is trying to use her to get at Liv, berates her and leaves. She is then flirted with by a random stranger, but pushes him away - prompting him to push her back. While Nick angrily confronts the boy, Liv goes outside and consoles Franky, and for the first time, questions her sexuality. Franky's response makes it clear that she does not want to talk about it. Then Alo's parents return, to find the teenagers fleeing the scene (Alo had mentioned that his father carried guns). Alo, drunkenly confronts his aghast family and berates his father for allowing his mother to henpeck him all the time, calling him "gormless and old." To his and his mother's horror, his father collapses and his mother immediately orders him to call an ambulance.

Alo goes to Nick's house, where he is continuing the party from earlier, as his father is gone for the week. He sits on a couch with Mini, and starts to cry. She comforts him, and as he leaves he smiles and says that she's "alright" leaving a possible love interest for both of them. Franky, meanwhile, wanders upstairs to discover Liv and Matty having sex in the bathroom. She leaves with tears in her eyes, and Matty sees this, though he doesn't mention it to Liv. Alo goes to Rich's house, where Rich confesses that he has had sex with Grace. Rich is exuberant about growing up, which prompts Alo to leave without telling him what is wrong. Alo goes to the hospital, where he sees the farmhand and Rags. The farmhand tells him that his father is fine, but he had known about getting worse; he hadn't told Alo because he didn't want him to worry. When Alo returns home, he receives the usual harsh response from his mother, but stands up for himself and pledges to her that he will try harder and "grow up," but demands that she makes an effort too and should be less mean, as she is too domineering and controlling. This encounter moves her to tears. On the farm, Alo ties a rope around the stubborn rock and hooks it to the tractor, where he tries to pull it out of the ground. His father appears and coaches him, and then says, "Nice one, mate." Alo replies with "Nice one, dad," hinting that their relationship will be fine.
