= Liv (Skins series 5) =

- Skins episode
- Episode no.: Season 5 Episode 4
- Directed by: Amanda Boyle
- Written by: Ed Hime
- Original air date: 17 February 2011

Guest appearances
- Jaye Griffiths as Agnes; Eloise Joseph as Bella; Steve Furst as Stanley; Lola Mae Loughran as Maude

Episode chronology
← Previous "Mini"	Next → "Nick"

"Liv" is the fourth episode of fifth series of the British teen drama Skins, which first aired on 17 February 2011 on E4. It focuses on the character Olivia "Liv" Malone (Laya Lewis), and features Liv as she attempts to deal with her feelings for her friend, Mini's (Freya Mavor) boyfriend, Nick Levan (Sean Teale), and Mini's increasingly hostile treatment of her, only to find herself hanging out with Nick's brother, Matty (Sebastian De Souza).

== Synopsis ==
The episode opens with Liv having sex with Nick, Mini's boyfriend, even though she had already promised it wouldn't happen again. Upon returning home, she discovers that her mother is going to an Eternal Circle retreat, following one of her many bizarre hobbies, and is entrusting the house and her youngest daughter, Maude on Liv, as their elder sister, Bella, is in prison.

Later, Liv receives a visit from Franky, Alo, Rich and Grace, who are followed by Mini and Nick. Inside, Mini apologises for her recent behaviour and calls a truce between the two groups, before producing a bag of weed. Alo immediately grabs it and proclaims that no-one may leave the house until it has all been smoked. Worried about the effect the drugs will have on her little sister, and that Mini knows about her affair with Nick, Liv leaves under the pretense of going to buy sherry, bringing Maude with her. She leaves Maude at a sci-fi movie marathon, failing to notice that it's 24 hours long, and goes off to visit Bella in prison. There, she confides to her sister about her situation with Mini and Nick, but Bella is unhelpful, prompting Liv to leave, frustrated. Sitting at a bus stop later on, Liv meets Matty, the same man Franky had met previously after her school meltdown, and they manage to obtain a large amount of ecstasy from a drug addict fleeing the police. Liv invites Matty to share it with her. He agrees, and they take the drugs, before going and stealing from a garage shop. While high, they go on a long walk, before ending up at a costume shop. There, the manager tricks them into trying on some clothes, before attempting to rape Liv. Matty arrives in the nick of time, knocking the manager unconscious with a fire extinguisher. They take a video recording of the incident on the security cameras, as well as some money from his till and some animal costumes. Later on, they return to ensure the man isn't dead, but discover that there are policemen outside the shop, and hurry away to a nearby disco. There, they share a kiss and proceed to have sex on the roof.

The next day, they head to Liv's house, to discover that the party they left is still going on. Matty and Liv go upstairs to have sex, only to discover that Nick is performing oral sex on Mini in Liv's bed. Nick, upon emerging from the covers, recognises Matty at once, and reveals him to be his brother. He immediately warns Liv that Matty is a "psycho" and inadvertently reveals their affair, and Mini can no longer pretend to Liv that it didn't happen. Liv immediately orders everyone to leave, telling Matty that she no longer knows or trusts him. She tidies up the house in preparation for her mother's return the next day and collapses on the couch, only to discover that Franky, who had passed out earlier, is still there, and orders her to leave. Before leaving, Franky questions Liv about her conflict with Mini, and puts on a video of Liv and Mini when they were children. This, along with her discovery that the man who tried to rape her is still alive, and has been arrested, moves Liv to tears. She is interrupted by the arrival of Maude, who is livid at being abandoned at the sci-fi marathon, and swears at Liv and storms off. Liv goes to prison to see Bella again, and informs her that she will not be returning. Desperate, she heads to the bus stop, to discover Matty is leaving. He is angry with her, but when he gets up to leave, Liv drinks an entire bottle of vodka. Horrified, Matty takes Liv to Nick's home to recover. Nick discovers they are there the next day, however, and Liv leaves. She meets up with Mini, and attempts to apologise for the affair with Nick. Mini coldly tells her that she will only forgive her if she does the same stunt she did with Matty. Despite being in obvious pain, Liv agrees, but after finishing the entire bottle of vodka, Mini insults her and leaves, leaving Liv to suffer. Heading home, Liv's mother tells her that the retreat she went to was a waste of her time, and demands to know about the crockery Maude broke in her fit of rage, saying she will not tolerate violence in her house. Liv then takes the blame for Maude. The episode ends with Liv joining Maude at the cinema and watching a movie with her.
