= Nick (Skins series 6) =

- Skins episode
- Episode no.: Series 6 Episode 6
- Directed by: Jack Clough
- Written by: Geoff Bussetil
- Original air date: 27 February 2012

Guest appearances
- Leander Deeny as Nu Folk student; Fiz Marcus as Receptionist; Kenneth Collard as The Doctor; Spencer Jones as Doctor Proctor; Jamie Brittain as DJ Flangmeister; Antonia Clarke as Carly; Kate Russell-Smith as Bank teller

Episode chronology
| ← Previous "Mini" | Next → "Alo" |
- Skins (series 6)

"Nick" is the sixth episode of the sixth series of the British teen drama Skins. It premiered on E4 in the UK on 27 February 2012. The episode is told from the point of view of character Nick Levan.

Nick is desperately in love with Franky, but it's a one-way street. He has no choice but to accept Franky as his friend and nothing more, while his love for her grows with each passing day. Then Matty gets in touch - he's still in love with Franky and needs Nick's help to get him out of Morocco and back to Bristol. Ever loyal, Nick tries to put his feelings for Franky aside and agrees to help his brother. Torn between his love for Franky, his loyalty to Matty and his fear of confrontation, Nick's life begins to spin wildly out of control until he has no choice but to step up and discover what he's truly capable of.

== Plot ==
Nick and Franky have never been closer - she relies on him as support for her and his love for her is getting more intense with every passing day. Despite this, Franky gives off no signs of reciprocating his feelings, and the subject of love is still difficult for her since Luke. One day, Nick receives a Skype call from Matty in Morocco - he has found someone to smuggle him back into the country, and he asks a very reluctant Nick to visit a Russian man, known only as "The Doctor," to pay him. Nick visits "The Doctor," and learns that he will have to pay £2,000 - which he does not have. Nick is distressed, and Franky notices during a chemistry lesson. She attempts to get him to talk, but he does not mention his problems, or even that Matty is trying to return. He later joins the rest of the gang (minus Franky) at a nightclub, where he blows his money on alcohol, and Alex convinces him to seduce a girl named Carly.

However, the next morning, Franky turns up at his house and discovers him with Carly, and leaves in a huff. Carly also leaves, observing that he is clearly in love with Franky, but also that she reciprocates. After receiving an angry call from Matty, Nick breaks into his father's bank account and takes £2,000 to "The Doctor," but he informs him that he needs an extra thousand. Nick is outraged, but has no choice. He leaves, and, desperate for someone to talk to, he calls Alo, who is still at the nightclub from the night before. There, he informs the gang about his situation, but they merely chide him for constantly following his brother; he loses his temper and storms off. Franky follows him and demands to know why he didn't tell her about Matty returning. They get into an argument, which ends with Nick pouring his entire heart out to her about how he feels. Franky is shocked, but merely says that she doesn't feel the same way, and he storms off, and kisses Alex on his way out as a means of apology.

Nick decides to step up, and returns to "The Doctor," storms into his office and searches for his money, but it has already been put into the bank. "The Doctor" overpowers Nick and pins him to the floor. He tells Nick that he is a good man, but his loyalty to Matty is a weakness, before informing him that the deal is off, and letting him leave. Nick returns home, but finds he doesn't have his key. Franky, however, turns up with it - she had picked it up off the floor the night before. She hands him £1,000 to fly Matty in, but he informs her that the deal is off. Franky then asks what he wants from her instead, and he slowly replies "Franky, you are the most beautiful person I have ever seen." She finally reciprocates his feelings, and they make love upstairs in his room. Later on, Franky sees Matty Skyping Nick again, and answers for him. Matty is shocked to see her, and tries to talk, but she simply glares at the camera and wordlessly hangs up.
