= Finale (Skins series 6) =

- Skins episode
- Episode no.: Series 6 Episode 10
- Directed by: Benjamin Caron
- Written by: Georgia Lester
- Original air date: 26 March 2012

Guest appearances
- Daniel Black as Rider; Gareth Farr as Jeff; Cavan Clerkin as Dillon; Annette Badland as Mavis; Georgia King as Clara; Caroline Paterson as Maris

Episode chronology
← Previous "Mini and Franky"	Next → "Skins Fire"
- Skins (series 6)

"Finale" is the tenth and final episode of the sixth series of the British teen drama Skins. It premiered on E4 in the UK on 26 March 2012. The episode is told from the point of view of all nine characters of the third generation.

A description of the episode on the Channel 4 website reads; "It's the end of an era. The exams results are in and Alex is throwing the mother of all leaving parties. Everyone's future hangs in the balance as Franky struggles to confront her past."

== Plot ==
Mini had issues with her pregnancy and so lies asleep in hospital, with Liv sitting with her attempting talk to her with no results.

Meanwhile, Franky finds the address of her social worker and goes to see her thanks to a friendly truck driver. There, the social worker discreetly helps her find her mother's address, but when Franky arrives she is confronted by her older sister, Clara, who informs her that their mother is dead.

Matty and Nick have noticed Franky's absence and, despite their feud, search for her after tracking Franky using an app. When she sees them Clara's apartment complex, Franky narrowly manages to escape them and hitches a ride from the same trucker until she discovers that he is heading back to Bristol: she then demands he pull over but he refuses, telling her that she can't run forever. Franky throws herself out of the truck and is rushed to hospital by the trucker.

Liv, who has been starting to feel isolated, asks Alex to forgo his gap year in Thailand, but he refuses and instead reminds her that there is still his final send-off party before the friends must say goodbye. Rich is given an offer from his top university choice but his joy is short-lived when Nick arrives and asks him if he can let Matty stay; he hesitantly agrees. While sharing a spliff, Matty apologises to Rich for Grace's death, which he accepts.

Back in the hospital, Franky visits a sleeping Mini. Liv is shocked when she sees the state Franky is in and starts to berate her for her melodramatic behaviour and manipulative tendencies until Mini wakes up and orders Liv out. As she comforts the crying Franky, she tells her gently that she will have to face Nick and Matty and can't run forever.

Alex's party rolls around and Alo convinces Mini's obstetrician to let her attend. At the party, Nick and Matty both set their sights on Franky as she continues to run from them. Eventually, she is confronted by an image of Grace, who encourages her to face up to the two. Franky tearfully admits to Nick and Matty that she loves both of them, but that she knows a relationship could not work between any of them, before going outside and being met by Clara, who takes Franky home. Matty and Nick decide to make peace. Meanwhile, Grace appears to Rich, and the two share a kiss, before she disappears.

The next day, Liv and Mini have finally reconciled, when Mini suddenly suffers contractions and has to be rushed to hospital. Clara offers Franky to take her to see where her mother's body is.

In a final closing scene, Franky is driven by Jeff and Clara to her mother but, rather than arriving at a graveyard, they arrive at a mental hospital where Franky is finally re-united with her mother. Meanwhile, Alex boards a bus for Heathrow Airport. Nick and Matty go to a police station, and share a final hug before Matty goes inside and turns himself in. At the hospital, Mini gives birth to her baby girl with the support of Liv and Alo. Outside the maternity ward, Rich hears the cries of Mini's baby. Smiling, he casts his eyes heavenward and finally says goodbye to Grace (and the viewer).
