= Everyone (Skins series 6) =

- Skins episode
- Episode no.: Series 6 Episode 1
- Directed by: Jack Clough
- Written by: Bryan Elsley
- Original air date: 23 January 2012

Guest appearances
- Zack Zodje as Mahmut; Daniel Black as Rider; Joe Cole as Luke; James Burrows as Jake; Crispin Harris as Simon Sweetcheeks; Giles Thomas as Doug; Josie Long as Josie; Isy Suttie as Pauline

Episode chronology
← Previous "Everyone"	Next → "Rich"
- Skins (series 6)

"Everyone" is the first episode of the sixth series of the British teen drama Skins. It premiered on E4 in the UK on 23 January 2012.

The gang return in style burning their way through a holiday in Morocco, but what begins as a hedonistic trip turns into a living hell. By the time they return to Bristol, everything has changed...

== Plot ==
The gang are on holiday in Marrakesh, Morocco in a run-down villa, where they have found weed under the floorboards. On the first night, Alo finds them a party at a nearby villa owned by a boy called Luke, who is also from England. Franky, unhappy in her relationship with Matty, finds herself drawn to Luke. The following morning, Alo is seduced by Mini, but she swears him to secrecy about their encounter. Later, Luke and his mate Jake visit the gang and reveal they've been using the villa to stash weed. Luke forgives the gang for smoking it, but tells them he needs the rest back and invites them to a beach party. Once there, Luke asks Franky to run away with him. Mini and Alo decide to continue hooking up on the condition of complete secrecy. Jake taunts Matty about Luke and Franky's possible involvement and gives Matty a way to stop it: smuggle six kilogrammes of weed into Marrakesh.

Meanwhile, a Moroccan man named Mahmut warns Liv that Luke is very dangerous, and Liv watches as Franky gets into Luke's car. Matty gets into the smuggling car and watches them drive away. Grace joins him, wanting to talk, but Liv rushes up and demands they follow Franky and Luke. The chase becomes dangerously fast, and an oncoming truck forces Matty to swerve over the edge of the road. The car lands on its top and rolls over, nearly destroyed. As Liv emerges from the rubble and Grace lies motionless and bloody on the hood, Matty runs away from the scene to avoid being arrested for the possession of the marijuana which Luke placed inside his vehicle. Three weeks later, Grace is in hospital in a coma, Matty has disappeared and is wanted by the police, and the rest of the gang seem to have rejected Franky. Nick asks Mini why Matty won't call, and she replies that his brother loves Franky more than him. Shortly after, Nick ignores a call from Matty. Rich attempts to bring a CD and flowers to Grace, but Professor David Blood has forbidden the nurses from allowing Rich to visit. The nurse plays the CD for Grace, who is still unconscious and hooked to a respirator. The song is one she had previously recorded vocals on, which Rich and Alo finished for her after the accident.
