= Mini (Skins series 6) =

- Skins episode
- Episode no.: Series 6 Episode 5
- Directed by: Sam Donovan
- Written by: Daniel Lovett
- Original air date: 20 February 2012

Guest appearances
- Clare Grogan as Shelley McGuinness; Alastair Mackenzie as Gregory; Jacob Anderson as Ryan

Episode chronology
← Previous "Franky"	Next → "Nick"
- Skins (series 6)

"Mini" is the fifth episode of the sixth series of the British teen drama Skins. It premiered on E4 in the UK on 20 February 2012. The episode is told from the point of view of character Mini McGuinness.

Mini's hates her mum's pervy new live-in boyfriend, and to make matters worse, Alo has broken the rules of their 'no strings attached' secret relationship and declared his love for her. Mini feels trapped; she has lost control of her life and needs to get away. Ignoring advice from her mum and Liv, she seeks refuge with her dad, who has never been around that much, but promises it will be different this time. He sweeps Mini into his glamorous and grown-up world where she feels a million miles away from her problems, but Mini has a bigger problem that she cannot run away from and will ultimately have to face on her own.

== Plot ==
As Mini is having sex with Alo in a nightclub toilet, he breaks the terms of their 'no-strings-attached' relationship by declaring he loves her. Freaked out, she returns home, but is kept awake by her mother and her irritating new live-in boyfriend Eric having sex. After having an argument with her mother, Shelley, about it the next day, Mini calls her father Gregory, and arranges to meet up at a local aquarium. The meeting goes well, and Mini begins to rebuild her relationship with Gregory, to the chagrin of her mother. As she begins to integrate herself into his life, including arranging to go to Sydney, and flirt with his assistant, she begins distancing herself from her friends at school. However, she has been hiding a dark secret that she cannot hide forever - she is pregnant.

The only person who notices, however, is Franky, who recognises her regular vomiting spells as morning sickness, and her defensive attitude when questioned about it only serves to confirm Franky's suspicions. Although Franky promises not to say anything, Mini's sudden temper starts to alienate her from the others, including Liv and Alo.

Things come to a head when the gang crashes a party that Gregory arranged, and Alo, after snorting some cocaine, is compelled to march over and confront Gregory's assistant, whom he believes has feelings for Mini, which upsets a lot of fellow partygoers, getting him thrown out and Mini declaring they are finished. Mini then seduces Gregory's assistant and they go off to have sex, but he stops himself, fearing for his job, and politely leaves, and he is replaced by Liv, who wants to talk to Mini about her sudden change in demeanour. After Mini once again pushes her away, and Liv gets angry and storms out, Franky questions Mini about her pregnancy, and she tearfully admits she has not come to terms with it herself yet. After some gentle coaxing, she goes to her father and confesses to the pregnancy. They then make arrangements to fly to Sydney in a couple of days, and Mini goes home to pack. Her mother implores her not to go, but she coldly brushes her off.

Mini returns to Gregory's home, but arrives to discover it completely empty - he has left for Sydney permanently, just as Mini had feared he would, with only a note saying "Sorry. I love you" and a cheque for £500. She tries to ring him, but he is already on the plane, and she collapses in the kitchen, ripping up the note as she cries. She then goes to Alo in the hope of making up with him, but he coldly tells her that he is fed up with her treatment of him and asks her to leave. She returns home and discovers her mother weeping in the kitchen. Her boyfriend comes outside to smoke a cigarette and finds Mini there, and she implores him not to do to her mother what her father did. The next day, Franky escorts Mini to an ultrasound clinic. There, an initially reluctant Mini is implored to look at the scan, and breaks down in tears of joy as she sees her baby for the first time on the screen.
