= Grace (Skins) =

- Skins episode
- Episode no.: Season 5 Episode 7
- Directed by: Dominic Leclerc
- Written by: Jamie Brittain
- Original air date: 10 March 2011

Guest appearances
- Chris Addison as David Blood; Jenny Jules as Sonia Blood

Episode chronology
← Previous "Alo"	Next → "Everyone"

"Grace" is the seventh and penultimate episode of fifth series of the British teen drama Skins, which first aired on 3 March 2011 on E4. It focuses on Grace's (Jessica Sula) effort to get a good mark in her AS Drama by directing a production of William Shakespeare's Twelfth Night in order to be allowed by her father, David Blood, to stay at Roundview College.

== Synopsis ==
Rich and Grace wake up after having sex, and Grace realises, to her horror, that they are at her house, which she has always tried to avoid. It turns out that her father is David Blood, the Roundview College headmaster. She attempts to smuggle Rich out without her father noticing, but he is discovered after being attacked by the aggressive family dog, and Grace is forced to acknowledge him as her boyfriend.

Blood firmly informs his daughter that their "experiment" is over and it is time she returned to her old boarding school, Mayberry's College For Young Ladies. After Grace protests, he agrees that she may stay on the condition that she gets only As, starting now from her AS drama exam, a production of Twelfth Night, which stars the entire gang except Nick. Her relief turns to fear when Liv, a lead, forces Matty to quit as well, saying it is because she feels the gang are still angry with her for what she did with Nick. In fact, she is actually doing it because she has grown suspicious that Franky loves Matty, after watching them rehearse a particularly emotional scene from the play. Grace, after hearing Liv's excuse, decides to invite her, along with the other girls, to her house for a girl's night. Meanwhile, Rich is called into Professor Blood's office, where Blood has his academic records and his father's employment records. He offers to help Rich and give his father a better position in the Civil Service, if he sabotages Grace's play, leaving Rich in a difficult choice to either help his not-so-well-off family or Grace.

Shortly after, he agrees to invite Rich to dinner - which is very awkward, mostly due to his continual glaring at him. After dinner, Rich has a quiet argument with Grace, noting that she is a different person around her parents than when around him. Then the three girls arrive for the promised girls' night. They are shocked to discover Grace's secret, but then go up to Grace's room. There, she attempts to get them to rehearse, but they give in to Liv's offer of cocaine. While high, Franky's sexuality is brought up again, this time by Mini. When Franky gives the very vague response of saying she is "into people," Liv suspiciously asks her who she is "into" at the moment. Seeing Franky is unwilling to answer this question, Grace changes the subject.

After Professor Blood becomes suspicious, they quickly leave and go to a nearby nightclub. There, Mini and Franky go off to flirt with two unattractive men as a joke, and Grace discovers the rest of the gang are there. Tensions arise when Matty, seeing that one of the men is being too forward with Franky, marches over and scares him off, only to get into an argument with Mini and Liv. Grace then attempts to leave with a drunk Rich. Rich, however, firmly informs her that he doesn't know who is the real Grace, and angrily walks home himself. The next morning, Grace complains to her mother about the difficulty of her task and keeping her friends together. Her mother reminds her of the tale of Rapunzel, which she used to tell her when she was small. Deciding to "take control and be creative", Grace instructs Mini, who is standing in for Liv, to kiss Franky, the next morning at rehearsal. Her argument with Rich continues when he questions whether they are right for each other. Crying, she goes to the theatre. There, she tests the acoustics by reciting Hamlet's "To Be or Not To Be" soliloquy with Doug. The words resonate with her and, feeling empowered, she goes to Matty's and demands that he return to the play. He does, but there is a noticeable tension between him and Franky, made clear when she avoids his kiss. Seeing that not having Liv around will affect her grade, Grace gets frustrated, and goes to look for her. After finding her, she talks her into returning to the play.

Grace’s production begins well, with Liv and Franky performing their scene well with limited practice together. Rich evidently does not sabotage the play, even shooting Professor Blood a defiant look as he performs his scene. However, having seen Matty’s shocked reaction at seeing her kiss Franky, Liv has a heated, but very quiet argument with him backstage. She demands to know if he is in love with Franky. When he fails to respond, she tearfully informs him that they’ll be good together. But Grace intervenes and tells her to stay. Angry, Liv tells Matty to forget Franky, who is left in something of a state just minutes before she is meant to go on again. But they are successful in performing the final scene and receive a standing ovation. But, to Grace’s fury, she discovers that her father has been deceiving her the whole time – despite the fact that she got a good grade, he actually intends to send her back to her old school anyway. He protests, "I just want better for you", to which she coldly responds, "No, David, you just want a different daughter". Her mother comes into her room later that evening, and once again attempts to make her feel better with more stories, but she coldly scoffs at her mother for filling her head with lies and fantasies that mask her reality, causing her mother to leave unhappily.

At that moment, Rich turns up outside her window and serenades her by reciting some verses from Romeo and Juliet. He climbs up the drainpipe into her room and, beginning to cry, asks her to marry him. She replies with Miranda's speech from The Tempest: O wonder! How many goodly creatures are there here! How beauteous mankind is! O brave new world! That has such people in it!
