= Liv (Skins series 6) =

- Skins episode
- Episode no.: Series 6 Episode 8
- Directed by: Benjamin Caron
- Written by: Ben Bond; Bryan Elsley
- Original air date: 12 March 2012

Guest appearances
- Dan Black as Rider; Giles Thomas as Doug; Crispin Harris as Simon Sweetcheeks; Josie Long as Josie; Marcus Griffiths as Donovan; Eloise Josephs as Bella; Lola-Mae Loughran as Maude; Juliet Cadzow as Receptionist

Episode chronology
← Previous "Alo"	Next → "Mini and Franky"
- Skins (series 6)

"Liv" is the eighth episode of the sixth series of the British teen drama Skins. It premiered on E4 in the UK on 12 March 2012. The episode is told from the point of view of character Liv Malone.

Liv has been partying with her new best friend Alex ever since he arrived in Bristol, but then he disappears for a dirty weekend just when Liv needs him most. She reaches out to her other friends, but finds she is excluded from their lives. With nobody to turn to in her hour of need, Liv is forced to face up to the choices she's made and isn't quite as strong as she believed.

== Plot ==
Since finding Alex, Liv has been partying non-stop and suppressing her feelings about Grace's death, although she is plagued by occasional visions of her, similar to what Franky and Rich have suffered. After Alex meets an attractive boy named Donovan at a pre-exams party, the two decide to go out to a cottage on the coast together, leaving Liv alone in the house, where she is soon landed with her sister, Maude, by her recently released older sister, Bella. That night, she suddenly begins to suffer a massive stabbing pain in her side, and finds a large lump there, which she is scared might be Uterine cancer or an Ovarian cyst. The pain does not clear up. However, she resists the urge to go to the doctors to find out, and tells only Doug, her headmaster, when he confides in her that he is leaving Roundview to pursue a long sabbatical. With no one else to go to, she attempts to talk to Mini and Franky, but finds that Mini is reluctant to talk to her and she and Franky still have a tense relationship because of the previous incidents with Matty and Nick.

After Liv and Franky lock horns in the corridor, and when Liv questions why Franky has never accepted her role in the accident that ultimately led to Grace's death, Franky violently slaps her across the face. Mini decides to tell her about the truth, but Liv interrupts her after she tells her about having had sex with Alo, before she can tell Liv about her pregnancy. She later attempts to talk to Rich, but he is too busy on his revision, which causes her to explode at him for his seeming indifferent to Grace's death. That night, while hanging out in an Occupy Bristol camp, Liv receives a call from Maude telling her that her "friend" is back, and she rushes home, excitedly expecting to see Alex. But when she enters his room, she is aghast to find that it is, in fact, Matty who has returned. Alex returns the next day and runs into Matty for the first time. Liv reluctantly takes him to Mini's house to see Franky - who emphatically tells him that she doesn't want to see him. Liv once again attempts to speak to Mini, but Mini again responds with her usual coldness. However, something in Liv snaps, and she violently punches Mini twice in the face, before Matty drags her off Mini, who subsequently confesses to being pregnant with Alo's baby. Distraught, Liv runs outside, and is once again attacked by the stabbing pain from the lump in her side.

The next day, she goes straight to the clinic, but before a doctor arrives, the sympathetic receptionist offers to take a look at the lump. Upon looking at Liv's side, the receptionist tells her that there is no lump there, and when Liv looks, she finds the same thing - the lump was, in fact, imagined by her due to her fear of death, and the stabbing pain was a physical manifestation of her grief at Grace's death. Realising this, Liv breaks down in tears and finally begins to mourn Grace as the receptionist consoles her. The episode ends with Liv, Maude, Doug and Rich visiting Grace's grave.
