= Franky (Skins series 6) =

- Skins episode
- Episode no.: Series 6 Episode 4
- Directed by: Ian Barnes
- Written by: Sean Buckley
- Original air date: 13 February 2012

Guest appearances
- Joe Cole as Luke; James Burrows as Jake; Crispin Harris as Simon Sweetcheeks; Eve Barnes as Little girl; John Sessions as Geoff; Gareth Farr as Jeff; Alice Lowe as Jemima

Episode chronology
← Previous "Alex"	Next → "Mini"
- Skins (series 6)

"Franky" is the fourth episode of the sixth series of the British teen drama Skins. It premiered on E4 in the UK on 13 February 2012. The episode is told from the point of view of character Franky Fitzgerald.

== Plot ==
Franky is in a bad place – it's the week of her mock exams and she's unable to concentrate on her studies, is constantly having visions of Grace, and regularly ignoring Matty's calls. Mini is too busy having sex with Alo to help her, her adoptive fathers' efforts to support her simply make her feel smothered, and in her isolation, she is drawn towards Luke, the boy from Morocco, and she enters into a sexual relationship with him. Luke is violent and is constantly getting into fights, but she feels he's the only person who understands her, and his dangerous world provides an outlet for her to vent her anger, frustration and grief. This begins to take its toll on her life, and she begins to burn bridges with the rest of her friends - this includes being aggressive to her teachers, intimidating Mini and getting into a fight with Geoff, causing him to fall over and injure his skull. But despite all of this, help comes in the unlikely form of Nick, who has begun to develop feelings for Franky and repeatedly attempts to get her back on track, despite Luke's efforts to keep her with him.

After a talk from Jeff, Franky finally takes his advice to see a counsellor. There, she is presented with a Pingu toy, and asked who it represents to her. After a minute loses control of her grief at Grace's death and tearfully begs the Pingu doll (which she sees as Grace) for forgiveness, before flying into a rage and throwing a chair at it. She then returns to Luke in tears, and he consoles her, by first drying her eyes and then lightly slapping her cheek to wind her up. Nick tries to rescue her from a fight between Luke's gang and another gang and carries her off against her will while she screams at him to put her down. He finally does put her down outside and she tells him that she doesn't need rescuing, and she laughs at him once she realizes why he's been trying to help her. Luke catches up to them and beats up Nick. Franky seems pleased at first but becomes concerned when Luke continues to kick Nick while he's down and stops him. Luke is jealous and makes Franky choose which path she wants to follow. After some hesitation she chooses to go with Luke. While Luke is driving them Matty calls her and, realizing that she's with Luke, begs her to leave him. Luke also recognizes Matty's voice and tells Franky to hang up. She tells Luke that it's no one, and tells Matty to let go of her. Luke, jealous and enraged, grabs her phone from her and throws it out the window, startling her.

Back at Luke's apartment, he gets high and yells at her irrationally about how she's had three in one night. She's surprised and says that it isn't like that. He doesn't listen to her and repeatedly tells her that she thinks that she's a big girl. He unbuckles his belt and pushes her down on his bed, and at first she thinks that he's just initiating the kind of rough sex that they typically have, but when she asks him to look at her, he puts his hand on her face and continues while she struggles against him. After Luke rapes her, she flees his apartment as soon as she feels it is safe to leave, while he's in the shower and can't see her and returns home. Jeff consoles her about her place in their family, but she doesn't tell him about what happened the night before. Luke follows her back to her home, not wanting to let her go. He tells her that he loves her, and when she insists she doesn't want to be with him he belittles her, telling her that no one else would have her, that she should be grateful. When he raises his arm to strike her she starts to scream and ducks out of the way, but the larger and more imposing Jeff steps in between them and he very firmly orders him off. Franky then goes to Nick's house and makes amends with him, and a new friendship is born between them.
