= Rich (Skins series 6) =

- Skins episode
- Episode no.: Series 6 Episode 2
- Directed by: Sam Donovan
- Written by: Daniel Lovett
- Original air date: 30 January 2012

Guest appearances
- Daniel Black as Rider; Louise Bartle as O'Malley; Chris Addison as David Blood; Daniel Ryan as Kevin Hardbeck; Isy Suttie as Pauline; Liza Tarbuck as Anita Hardbeck

Episode chronology
← Previous "Everyone"	Next → "Alex"
- Skins (series 6)

"Rich" is the second episode of the sixth series of the British teen drama Skins. It premiered on E4 in the UK on 30 January 2012. The episode is told from the point of view of character Rich Hardbeck.

Professor David Blood has banned Rich from visiting Grace in hospital and Rich is suffering. Alo tries to keep him out of trouble with a band practice, but Rich is committed to his love and he stands outside the hospital waiting for Grace's call. Eventually the call comes and Rich finds a way past security and breaks into Grace's room. The lovers are reunited, but they have a problem as Blood is moving Grace to another hospital in Zurich. Rich goes to Grace's house to appeal to Professor Blood, but finds they've already gone. Rich moves into the house, sleeping in Grace's room until Alo tracks him down and pledges to help his best mate, but Alo has other things on his mind and cracks begin to develop in the boys' friendship. It falls to Liv to bring the fractured group back together again.

The episode was filmed in September 2011.

== Plot ==
Rich has been desperately waiting for Grace, who is in a coma after the car crash in the previous episode, to wake up, having been barred from visiting her by her father, David Blood. Despite the best efforts of Alo and his friend O'Malley to get Rich involved in a band, Grace's condition occupies Rich's mind permanently, and even causes him to alienate his parents. Eventually, though, he receives a phone call from Grace, and rushes to the hospital to come and see her. After managing to sneak in through a vent, the two begin to kiss, but Blood walks in and has Rich escorted from the premises, revealing that he is taking Grace to Switzerland, ostensibly to keep her away from Rich. Rich is upset and, the next day, goes to Blood's house to try and reason with him to let Grace stay, only to find that the Bloods have already left. Devastated, he breaks into their house, and discovers an old collection of film reels, which turn out to be Grace's baby videos, and he occupies his time watching them.

Days later, Alo comes knocking, having worked out that Rich is staying in the house, and offers support. They squat there with a bag of weed and begin trashing the house. However, Rich continues to be occupied by his pain at not seeing Grace, which is made even worse when Mini turns up at the house to have sex with Alo. Rich attempts to call the hospital in Switzerland, but Blood picks up the phone and tells Rich off. Nonetheless, he receives another call from Grace, and tells her to meet him in Paris. Rich's temper reaches boiling point when Alo moves the band stuff into the house, and in his rage, he begins to destroy the instruments. He then has an argument with Alo over his having sex with Mini, and when he makes a harsh comment, their argument becomes a fistfight. Depressed, Rich contacts Liv, who is shocked to discover that Grace had awoken from her coma and nobody had bothered to call her. She in turn informs Franky, and the three resolve to go to Paris to find Grace (since Franky is fluent in French). Alo reveals that he has arranged a band gig at the Bloods' house, and that if they charge a £5 entrance fee, they can get to Paris in Alo's van. During the gig, however, Rich begins to see Grace in the crowd, and runs after her. He makes it up to her room, and finds her in bed. Relieved, the two begin to have sex.

Then next morning, however, Rich wakes up in an empty bed, finding the house wrecked and empty. He hears his phone ringing outside, picks it up and answers a call from Grace, who cryptically tells him that she has to go, and comments that "it's so beautiful, out here." When the call ends, Rich looks at the phone to find that it is broken. He returns inside, where Blood has returned home. Rich learns that Grace had not even come out of her coma — meaning that his visions of her and the phonecalls were just hallucinations. Blood acknowledges the damage that has been done to his house but is unfazed by it, and, through tears, informs Rich that Grace has died.
