= Alo (Skins series 6) =

- Skins episode
- Episode no.: Series 6 Episode 7
- Directed by: Benjamin Caron
- Written by: Laura Hunter
- Original air date: 5 March 2012

Guest appearances
- Holly Earl as Poppy Champion; Lucy Gape as Megan; Charlotte Beaumont as Cheska; Giles Thomas as Doug; Jamie Michie as Connell; Sarah Solemani as Celia; Dan Tetsell as Smithy; Mark Stobbart as Mitch; Dave Hill as Dewi

Episode chronology
← Previous "Nick"	Next → "Liv"
- Skins (series 6)

"Alo" is the seventh episode of the sixth series of the British teen drama Skins. It first aired on E4 in the UK on 5 March 2012. The episode is told from the point of view of characters Alo Creevey.

Alo still has no idea that Mini is carrying his baby. He attempts to get over Mini by hooking up with a new girl, Poppy Champion. She's perfect for Alo and Mini is soon a distant memory. Franky's attempts to make him see sense fall on deaf ears, but Alo's choices come back to haunt him and he's soon out of his depth.

== Plot ==
In an effort to get over Mini, Alo starts to pursue a relationship with Poppy Champion, a petite girl who flirted with him at a rave. He takes her for a picnic lunch in the woods in his tractor, and while there, they share a kiss, and Alo asks if she will be his girlfriend. Poppy agrees, and, after performing a dance number to Martin Solveig's "Hello", while wearing only their underwear, they go upstairs to have sex. However, as Alo is in the middle of the act, he notices several childish toys and posters lining the walls and furniture, and then a school uniform hanging in Poppy's wardrobe, which has a crest on the lapel that he recognises. Suddenly frightened, he stops the sex at once and demands to know how old Poppy is, and she reveals she is thirteen. Alo, horrified that he is now technically a paedophile, tells Poppy that she is too immature to understand what they did wrong. He flees from her house, narrowly avoiding her parents arguing in the kitchen.

Alo resolves to go to Poppy's house and break up with her. However, it is her fourteenth birthday and Poppy has been bragging to her friends about it, resulting in Alo's break-up attempt causing her utmost humiliation and devastation. In her anger, Poppy reports Alo to the police, resulting in him being dragged out of his exam, charged with statutory rape and suspended from school. Alo fails to convince anyone that he did not know Poppy was underage, mostly due to his inability to say the right thing and their refusal to listen, but is eventually bailed out by Rich, the only person who hasn't turned their back on Alo. Alo reluctantly calls Poppy and berates her for her actions, but as she is about to apologise, the phone is grabbed by her aggressive father, who threatens Alo and hangs up. Alo runs away from home and starts to sleep in a playground - despite his reputation.

Alo is found by Dewi, his family's farmworker, who tells him his parents are both worried about him, before comparing him to Peter Pan and giving him money if he does want to run away. Deciding to stay and sort his problems out, he goes to Mini's house and confronts her, seeing her as the root of his problems. Although she forces him to leave, he manages to get through to her and tell her that he doesn't like her as she is behaving, causing her to cry.

Alo goes to Poppy's house to confront her parents. There, Poppy tells her parents that what she told the police was a lie, only for a massive argument to erupt between Poppy's parents, and Alo, seeing how upset Poppy is with it, ends it by bellowing at the two to shut up. He tells the father that Poppy's allegations are true, and he indeed engaged in sexual activity with her without knowledge of her age. Unfortunately, his speech is not enough for them to reconsider as he ends up getting beaten up and then thrown out by Poppy's father, who tells him that he will see him in court. Alo picks himself up and returns home. The next day, Mini comes to his farm and confronts him, but just as she is about to tell Alo about her pregnancy, Alo receives a phonecall from Poppy, who tells him that her parents have split up, and that her mother has forced her father to drop the charges and threatened to report him for beating Alo up the night before. They part on good terms, but Alo hangs up to find that Mini has gone.
