= Mini and Franky =

- Skins episode
- Episode no.: Series 6 Episode 9
- Directed by: Ian Barnes
- Written by: Jess Brittain
- Original air date: 19 March 2012

Guest appearances
- Justin Edwards as Eric; Clare Grogan as Shelley; Dawn Porter as Receptionist; Tim Key as Dr. O'Dwyer; Tanya Moodie as Layla

Episode chronology
← Previous "Liv"	Next → "Finale"
- Skins (series 6)

"Mini and Franky" is the ninth and penultimate episode of the sixth series of the British teen drama Skins. It premiered on E4 in the UK on 19 March 2012. The episode is told from the point of view of characters Mini McGuinness and Franky Fitzgerald.

Mini and Franky are still holed up in Mini's bedroom, but with Matty back in Bristol and Mini's ever-growing baby bump, time is quickly running out for the girls. Things come to a head when Mini's health takes a turn for the worse leaving them isolated and under pressure from family and friends.

== Plot ==
The episode begins Franky waking up in Mini's bed and putting her hand towards the light coming in through the window. She turns over, expecting to see Mini, before realises that she is hiding under the duvet. Franky tells Mini that her ultrasound appointment is today, but Mini is reluctant to go. Franky is in the kitchen cooking French toast, when suddenly Mini's mum Shelley and her boyfriend Eric return home from their holiday. Shelley, still unaware of Mini's pregnancy, goes upstairs to check on her and Mini only just manages to cover up her baby bump by covering herself with her duvet. Later, when Franky and Mini are having breakfast, Mini goes over to the window and discovers Matty standing outside, much to her horror. Afterwards, Franky takes Mini to her ultrasound appointment and Matty, wanting to talk to Franky begins following them. While Matty and Franky argue, Mini suddenly collapses behind them. After not initially noticing, Matty calls an ambulance and Mini is rushed to hospital. At the hospital, Alo and Shelley are shocked when they find out about Mini's pregnancy, and Nick finds out that Matty is back in Bristol, causing a fight to break out between the two brothers in the hospital waiting area. Shelley wants Mini to give the baby up for adoption, and they have a blazing row about it, while Franky refuses to call the police on Matty and gives off indications that she may still have feelings for him. Alo, meanwhile, is determined that he doesn't want a baby.

Mini and Franky meet up outside Mini's house, and Franky becomes determined to prevent Shelley from making Mini give up her baby, due to her own experiences with adoption. With a symbolic switching off of their iPhones, the two girls escape to another part of Bristol and find a homeless shelter to stay for the night, masquerading as a lesbian couple to get a room together. The next day, however, Franky intercepts a call from Alo to Mini's phone and deletes it, not wanting anyone to contact Mini. But Mini is starting to have doubts about whether running away from their troubles will make things better. Franky attempts to persuade her to go to Oxford (where she had lived before moving to Bristol), but Mini refuses, and is found by her new stepfather at the bus station. He persuades her to return home, and manages to coax Franky, who is desperate not to lose the only mother figure in her life, to come with them. When they return to Mini's house, Franky is gently sent upstairs to run a bath, and Shelley tells Mini the story of her near miscarriage, and agrees to let her keep the baby. Franky, who has been listening, loses it and flees the house, running down the street in tears. Later that night, Rich picks Mini up and takes her to Alo's farm, where Mini and Alo kiss and finally form a proper relationship. The two dancing a musical number, but suddenly, Mini discovers blood running down her leg.
