= Megan Prescott =

English actress

- Born: 4 June 1991 (age 35); Palmers Green, London, England
- Occupation: Actress
- Years active: 2008–present (acting); 2016–present (bodybuilding)
- Relatives: Kathryn Prescott (twin sister)

Megan Prescott (born 4 June 1991) is an English actress, writer and bodybuilder, who is best known for her role as Katie Fitch in the double BAFTA-winning teen drama Skins.

== Early life ==
Prescott was born in Palmers Green, London, and is six minutes younger than her twin sister Kathryn Prescott, who is also an actress. She also has a younger brother, Ben. Prior to acting professionally, Prescott attended weekly drama classes, where she met future Skins co-star Lily Loveless.

== Career ==
Although Prescott made her acting debut in an episode of the BBC soap opera Doctors alongside her twin sister Kathryn in 2008, her breakthrough role was as Katie Fitch in the third and fourth series of Skins (2009 - 2010).

After appearing in Skins, Prescott briefly enrolled at university to study television production and directing, before dropping out.

In 2013, Prescott appeared as Jade Podfer on the British medical drama Holby City and in horror movie Shortcuts To Hell: Volume 1, as well as the feature film Sleeping Rough.

In 2016, Prescott began to pursue bodybuilding. A friend of hers, who was just beginning a career as a personal trainer, offered her training sessions for "a fiver", which led to her later competing in bodybuilding professionally. Ahead of competing in the finals of the UKBFF Bikini Fitness, she appeared on the reality show Body Fixers.

During the COVID-19 pandemic, Prescott started an OnlyFans page as a source of income.

In 2024 she wrote the one-woman play, Really Good Exposure, going on to perform it at the Edinburgh Fringe Festival. The play was reprised at the Soho Theatre in 2025.

== Personal life ==
In December 2021, Prescott was diagnosed with autism. She also has attention deficit hyperactivity disorder.

== Filmography ==
Year	Film	Role	Notes
2008	Doctors	Charlotte "Cookie" Wilcox	Episode: "Dare, Double Dare, Truth"
2009–2010	Skins	Katie Fitch	Main cast member
2009	T4 on the Beach 2009	Herself	
2009	BBC Switch Live	Herself	
2009	Big Brother's Little Brother	Herself	2 episodes
2010	The Paralympic Show	Herself	
2010	100 Greatest Toys	Herself	
2012	Silent Witness	Gemma McAteer	Episode: "Domestic"
2013	The Meeting Place	Hazel	Short film
2013	Shortcuts to Hell: Volume 1	Possessed girl	
2013	Holby City	Jade Podfer	Episode: "The Cost of Loving"
2013	Pete's Kingdom	Marie	
2014	Turn Around When Possible	Sarah	Short film
2016	Body Fixers	Herself	S01E03
2017	The Verge	Brute	Short film
2017	Cut	Becky	Short film
2018	Sleeping Rough	Toni	
2022	EastEnders	Candy	
2024	Really Good Exposure	TBC	Edinburgh Fringe stage show
