= Emily (Skins) =

- Skins episode
- Episode no.: Season 4 Episode 2
- Directed by: Philippa Langdale
- Written by: Ed Hime
- Original air date: 4 February 2010

Guest appearances
- Giles Thomas as Doug; Ian "H" Watkins as Graham; Pauline Quirke as DS Blunt; Redd Smith as James Fitch; John Bishop as Rob Fitch; Ronni Ancona as Jenna Fitch; Richard Southgate as Matt Moore

Episode chronology
← Previous "Thomas"	Next → "Cook"

"Emily" is the second episode of the fourth series of the British teen drama Skins, and 31st overall. It first aired on 4 February 2010 on E4 in both Ireland and the United Kingdom. The episode was written by Ed Hime, and was directed by Philippa Langdale. The episode focuses on the character of Emily Fitch (Kathryn Prescott), her continuing romantic relationship with girlfriend Naomi Campbell (Lily Loveless) as well as family problems with her mother Jenna Fitch. Emily decides to investigate the suicide of Sophia Moore, the girl who killed herself in the first episode, suspecting Naomi cheated on her with Sophia.

The episode was filmed in September 2009.

== Plot ==
While Emily and Naomi spend time together, Naomi gifts Emily a pair of goggles. They use Emily's moped to visit the Fitch house, where Emily's mother, Jenna, insists that they have a conversation about Emily's future. Emily brushes her off and rides to Roundview College with Naomi. At Roundview, the police interview Emily and Naomi, as Sophia's family listed them as close friends. During the interview, Emily discovers that Naomi was dealing MDMA with Cook the night of the suicide, and that Naomi used the money to buy the goggles. Effy returns to college and tells Freddie that she has been thinking about him over the summer.

Emily secretly visits Sophia's family and learns that Sophia referred to her and Naomi as her best friends. Upon inspecting her room, Emily also discovers that Sophia was gay. Before leaving, she takes a wooden box and a university prospectus with a key inside. While looking through the prospectus, Emily finds photos of Naomi and Sophia, realizing that they were close friends, and suspects that Naomi cheated on her with Sophia. Emily confronts Naomi with the photos during class, and Naomi admits that she met Sophia at a University Open Day, but insists that nothing happened between them. Emily tells Naomi about the key she found, and Naomi says that it may be for Sophia's locker at the army base. They go to the base and open Sophia's locker, finding a shrine to Naomi inside, discovering that Sophia was infatuated with Naomi. The two reconcile and have sex in the storage closet.

Later, Emily has a falling out with her mother and decides to move out. Katie begs her to stay, but Emily leaves and moves in with Naomi. They attend a party together later that night, and Emily becomes suspicious after seeing Naomi talking to other girls. Also at the party, Cook becomes enraged and fights a stranger after seeing Effy and Freddie kissing. The morning after, Emily takes Sophia's wooden box and meets with Sophia's brother, Matt, and the club where his sister died. Naomi suddenly appears and asks Emily to forget about Sophia. Matt runs to the roof, and they open the box, finding Sophia's sketchbook containing drawings depicting a one-day affair with Naomi.

A distraught Emily leaves, and Naomi pleads with Emily to forgive her. Emily returns home and tearfully tells her father that Naomi had cheated on her. As he consoles her, Rob confesses that he once cheated on Jenna. Emily goes back to Naomi's house, reading a note on the front door saying, "I'll do anything", before entering.

== Production ==
Lily Loveless and Kathryn Prescott have hinted in interviews that series 4 was about their characters "being a fully fledged couple" with Loveless saying the previous series was just "the chase". Prescott said that viewers were left with the impression of them "living happily ever after" but this series had Naomi "clearly messing around in that happy summer". After reading the script, Loveless felt "very sad that Naomi cheated". Prescott commented that she "thought Naomi was a bitch" for cheating, pointing out costar Loveless would agree as well. Loveless commented that she thought Naomi "cheated as a way of escapism" as she was not the kind of person who has relationships.

Director Philippa Langdale told Loveless and Prescott to not look into the locker containing Sophia's shrine to Naomi before filming as to get the full effect of being "properly weirded out" on the first take. When the locker opened on the first take, Loveless wanted to laugh "because it was so mental."

Ed Hime, who wrote the episode, commented that during the airing of series 3, he wanted "to write for Emily.....and then watched Naomily become a bona-fide phenomenon". He "thought of all the assembled Naomily fans, who had invested so much love and hope in them [and] felt a paralysing mixture of fear, duty, and a desperate need to impress." As such, Ed Hime "wanted to write about the dark side of Naomily" and "what happens after you've got the girl and walked off into the sunset?" He cast Emily as "the intrepid detective", citing Emily's traits - "her purity, intelligence, bravery and tenacity" are "traits that make a great private eye."

This episode used an illustrator to tell the story of Naomi's affair through Sophia's sketchbook. Company Pictures hired Lydia Starkey, who commented she "stylised [her] visual language to suit Sophia's character and emotional situation."

== Reception ==
According to early reports, "Emily" drew 962,000 viewers, maintaining strong ratings from the previous week. The Broadcasters' Audience Research Board reported that "Emily" was E4's 2nd most watched show of the week with 1,025,000 viewers.
