= Sam Jackson (actor) =

English actor (born 1993)

- Born: Sam Benjamin Jackson; 23 September 1993 (age 33); Wetherby, West Yorkshire, England
- Occupation: Actor
- Years active: 2010–present
- Height: 1.73 m (5 ft 8 in)

Sam Benjamin Jackson (born 23 September 1993) is an English actor from Wetherby, West Yorkshire, best known for playing Alex Henley in the sixth series of the E4 teen drama Skins.

== Career ==
Jackson worked in television during the school-age years, appearing in the Asda commercial and in a number of small roles in shows like Heartbeat. In 2010, he gained main parts in Ten Tigers, a short film directed by Tony Kelly, and in Audrey where he played the part of Eddie.

In 2012, Jackson joined the third generation of the teen drama Skins during its sixth series, in which he plays Alex Henley, described as a "mysterious flirty new guy." He had auditioned for the part of Rich Hardbeck in the previous series but he didn't get it. Afterwards he gained supporting roles in the BBC series of The Syndicate and Holby City.

His first professional theatre job came in 2013 with the production of Kes at Derby Theatre, where he played the central role of Billy Casper. In 2015 he played the role of Jamie in Beautiful Thing.

== Filmography ==
| Year | Title | Role | Notes |
|---|---|---|---|
| 2010 | Audrey | Eddie | Short film |
| 2010 | Ten Tigers | Cameron | Short film |
| 2012 | Skins | Alex Henley | E4 series (8 episodes) |
| 2013 | The Syndicate | Jonathan Summers | BBC One series (1 episode: No.2.4) |
| 2013 | Holby City | Cameron Pollins | BBC One series (3 episodes: No.15.40, 15.41, 15.47) |
| 2013 | Drifters | James | E4 series |
| 2017 | Father Brown | Sean Crimp | BBC One series (1 episode: No. 5.14) |
| 2019 | How to Summon Satan | Sammy Dodger | Short film |
| 2021 | The Drowning of Arthur Braxton | Adam | Feature film |

== Theatre ==
| Year | Title | Role | Notes |
|---|---|---|---|
| 2013 | Kes | Billy Casper | Derby Theatre |
| 2015 | Beautiful Thing | Jamie | |
