= Everyone (Skins series 5) =

- Skins episode
- Episode no.: Season 5 Episode 8
- Directed by: Dominic Leclerc
- Written by: Sean Buckley
- Original air date: 17 March 2011

Guest appearance
- Chris Addison as David Blood

Episode chronology
← Previous "Grace"	Next → "Everyone"
- Skins (series 5)

"Everyone" is the eighth and final episode of fifth series of the British teen drama Skins. It aired on E4 on 17 March 2011.

== Synopsis ==
Grace, lying to her father that she is saying goodbye to the gang, sets off to Liv's place to prepare for her wedding. Blood gives her a brooch, without telling her it has a tracking device in it. Meanwhile, Rich is given a haircut – and most of his hair is cut off in the process. Mini goes to the Levan house and coldly orders Matty to stay away from Franky, whom she has been protecting because Matty has "made her ill." After making final preparations, the gang set off for the church in a neighbouring town.

Alo, Rich's best man, has not brought a proper map with him, and drives them into the middle of nowhere, where the van breaks down. Angry with him, Rich and Grace manage to hitch a ride to the church. The gang set off on foot. Liv and Matty, however, lose confidence in Alo's navigation skills and decide to set off on their own. They invite Franky to go along with them, and despite Mini's pleas, Franky agrees. Rich and Grace finally make it to the church, but discover they have missed their slot. The priest offers them a slot in an hour. Liv, Matty and Franky, meanwhile, take some MDMA and reach a nearby village. They break into the village church (not the one they are meant to go to) and Matty begins to play the piano. Liv, remembering his reaction at seeing her kiss Franky in Twelfth Night, starts to seduce Franky in front of him. He shakes his head at her, and they are chased off by a gun-wielding local. After reaching safety, Matty and Liv have an argument about Liv's actions in the church, and she admits that she is afraid of losing him. Franky keeps going, and Liv desperately begs Matty to stay with her, but he chooses to go after Franky instead. Mini, meanwhile, gets fed up with Alo and Nick's seemingly uncaring behaviour, because she is worried that something will happen to her friend. She splits off from the two and goes to find Liv, Matty and Franky herself. This leaves Alo and Nick to take their own route. On the way, Nick gets snared in a rabbit trap. Alo manages to free his leg and helps him limp on, until they reach a road. Mini manages to meet up with Liv, and, after discovering that Franky is missing, admits that she is frightened for Franky's safety, which prompts Liv to question whether Mini has a crush on Franky; she and Liv reconcile and set off to find Franky and Matty. Problems get worse when Professor Blood, while having lunch, sees Grace's location on his GPS and immediately goes after her.

Matty eventually catches up with Franky, and they stand in the middle of the forest. They have a heated argument, and she tearfully recounts having said that 9/11 was "the most beautiful thing" she could think of as a 6-year-old child, which had made her schoolmates and teachers believe she was mentally disturbed, and believes that her parents knew she was 'wrong', which is why she was put up for adoption. The two then start to kiss on the forest floor. Very suddenly, Franky has a panic attack and throws Matty off before running off through the woods in a blind rage, with a shocked Matty in hot pursuit. She runs past Liv and Mini, who stop Matty and demand an explanation. Seeing him hastily button up his trousers, they realise what has happened and, frightened that Franky might hurt herself in her current state of mind, join in the chase. As they catch up with Franky and call to her, she is distracted, trips over a branch, and falls over the side of a cliff. Despite some resistance from Franky, Liv manages to pull her back up, and they gather around to comfort her. Meanwhile, Alo and Nick see David Blood drive past on his way to the church, and desperately flag down a ride. They manage to get there ahead of him, and warn Grace and Rich, who proceed with the service. Before it can continue, David and Sonia enter the Church. They have a confrontation with Grace, as Mini, Franky, Liv and Matty arrive. Blood angrily informs everyone that they are expelled, but Nick angrily accuses him of flaunting his powers, before making an impassioned speech. Blood sullenly agrees to let them continue, and leaves the church.

But Grace and Rich decide that they don't need to get married after all, and proceed to a nearby marquee, to celebrate the wedding. There, Liv and Matty reconcile but break up and are left on somewhat good terms, and Franky calms down. As she enters the marquee, she and Matty text each other from across the tent and eventually make peace. The episode ends as the two embrace.
