= Ed Hime =

British screenwriter and playwright

- Born: 1978; London, England
- Occupation(s): Screenwriter, playwright
- Known for: The Incomplete Recorded Works of a Dead Body; Doctor Who

Ed Hime (born 1978), is a British screenwriter and playwright, best known for his work with the BBC science fiction television series Doctor Who.

== Career ==
Hime was born in 1978 in London. He was a fan of Doctor Who in his youth. He began his career as a playwright in 1998, releasing the play About the Boy that same year. Other plays he had written included Small Hours (at Hampstead Theatre), as well London Falls and London Tongue at the Old Red Lion Theatre. He also worked in radio, winning the 2007 Prix Italia award for Best Original Radio Drama for his radio play, The Incomplete Recorded Works of a Dead Body.

On television, Hime has written for the fourth and fifth series of the teen drama Skins. Hime was attached to work on a new series of Sapphire & Steel with Luther creator Neil Cross. However, the project was never produced.

In 2018, he wrote the ninth and penultimate episode of the eleventh series of Doctor Who, It Takes You Away. He returned to write the third episode of the twelfth series, Orphan 55. He co-wrote the seventh episode of The Watch, which is inspired by the Ankh-Morpork City Watch from the Discworld series of fantasy novels by Terry Pratchett. He wrote three of the eight episodes of Lockwood & Co., the Netflix series about teenage ghost hunters released in 2023.

== Filmography ==
Year	Title	Notes	Broadcaster
2010–11	Skins	Episodes: "Emily" and "Liv"	E4
2018–20	Doctor Who	Episodes: "It Takes You Away" and "Orphan 55"	BBC One
2021	The Watch	Episode: "Nowhere in the Multiverse"	BBC America
2023	Lockwood & Co.	Episodes: "Doubt Thou the Stars", "Sweet Dreams" and "Mesmerised"	Netflix
