= Jessica Sula =

British actress (born 1994)

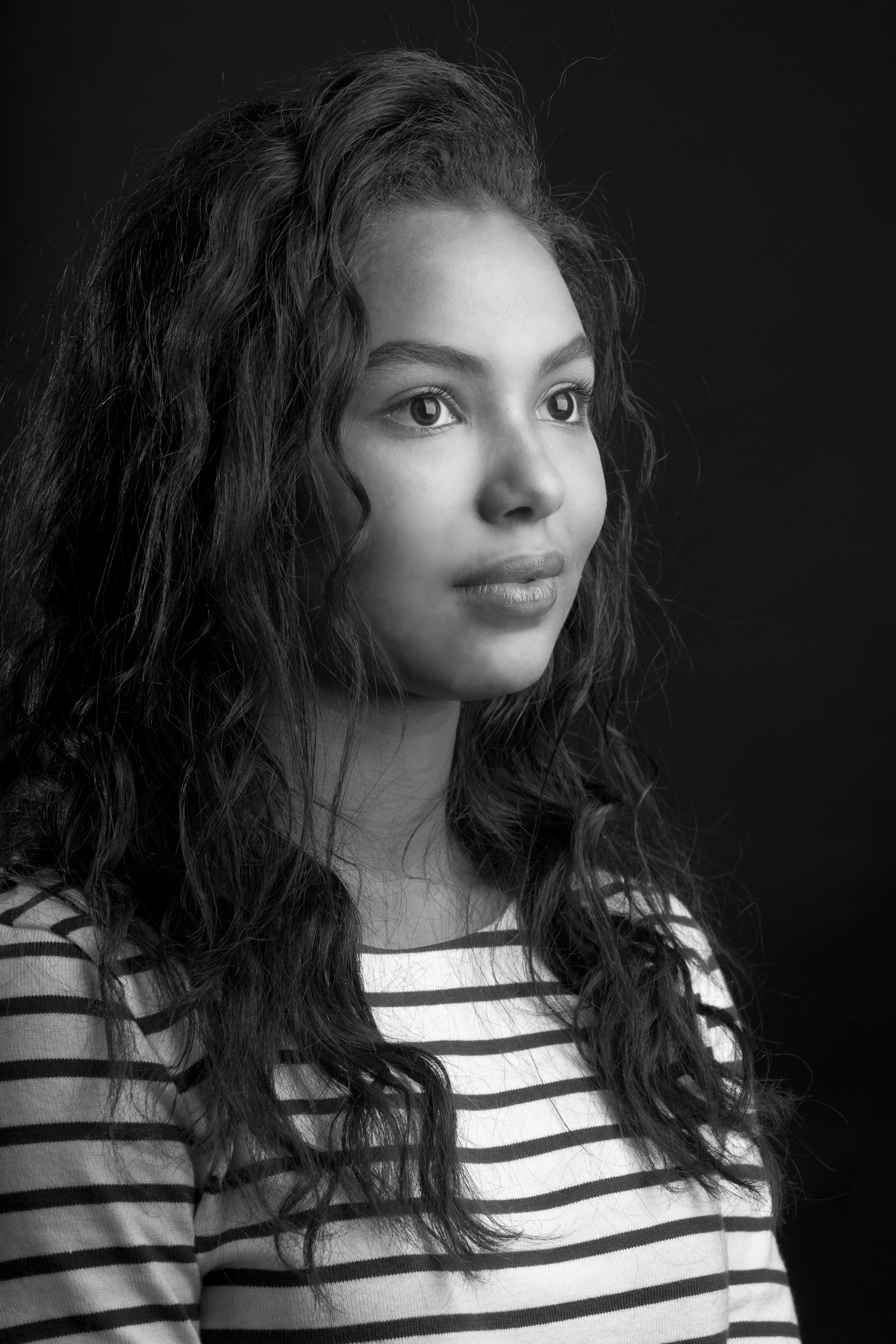
- Sula in 2012
- Born: 3 May 1994 (age 32); Swansea, Wales
- Education: Gorseinon College
- Occupation: Actress
- Years active: 2011–present

Jessica Bianca Sula (born 3 May 1994) is a Welsh actress. On television, she is known for her roles in the third generation of the E4 series Skins (2011–2012), the ABC Family series Recovery Road (2015–2016), the VH1 series Scream: Resurrection (2019) and the Amazon Prime series Panic (2021). Her films include Split (2016) and Malum (2023).

== Early life and education ==
Sula was born in Swansea to Trinidadian mother Shurla Blades, who has Afro-Trinidadian and Chinese ancestry, and to Steven Sula, a father of German and Estonian heritage. She grew up in Gorseinon, Wales, where she completed her A-levels in Spanish, French and Drama at Gorseinon College.

== Career ==
Sula made her television debut in 2011, portraying Grace Blood in the fifth and sixth series of the E4 teen drama Skins. Afterwards, she gained a supporting role in comedy drama Love and Marriage which was broadcast on ITV in 2013. In 2015, Sula was cast as the lead character, Maddie Graham, in the Freeform drama Recovery Road, alongside Skins co-star Sebastian de Souza.

Her first big screen leading role was in Honeytrap, the story of a 15-year-old girl who sets up the murder of a boy who is in love with her. In 2017 she filmed the independent feature Big Fork, in which she played the main character, Emily.

Sula had a recurring role in the 2017 limited series Godless. That same year, it was announced that she would be a series regular for the third season of the series Scream, portraying high school cheerleader Olivia "Liv" Reynolds. The season premiered on VH1 on 8 July 2019.

== Personal life ==
Sula plays the guitar and practices karate.

== Filmography ==
Key
†	Denotes films that have not yet been released

=== Film ===
Year	Title	Role	Notes
2014	Honeytrap	Layla	
2016	Split	Marcia	
2017	The Lovers	Erin	
2017	The Lost	Tina Harmon	Short film
2019	All the Little Things We Kill	Katy Walker	
2020	Big Fork	Emily	
2023	Malum	Jessica Loren	
2026	Michael	La Toya Jackson	Debut film
2026	Play House	Cath	

=== Television ===
Year	Title	Role	Notes
2011–12	Skins	Grace Blood	Main cast (series 5-6)
2013	Love and Marriage	Scarlett Quilter	Supporting cast
2015	Eye Candy	Morgan	Episode: "YOLO"
2016	Recovery Road	Madeline "Maddie" Graham	Main cast
2016	Lucifer	Amy Dodd	Episode: "Everything's Coming Up Lucifer"
2017	Godless	Louise Hobbs	Recurring role
2019	Scream: Resurrection	Olivia "Liv" Reynolds	Main cast (season 3)
2019	Epic Night	Jessica	2 episodes
2021	Panic	Natalie Williams	Main cast
