= Laya Lewis =

English actress

- Born: Laya Aiesha Lewis; 14 May 1992 (age 34); Tooting, London, England
- Occupation: Actress
- Years active: 2010–present
- Known for: Skins

Laya Aiesha Lewis (born 14 May 1992) is an English actress, best known for her role as Liv Malone in the fifth and sixth series of the E4 drama Skins (2011–2012).

== Early life ==
Laya Lewis was born at St George's Hospital in Tooting, South London, but grew up in Bristol. Her mother was born in Britain to Jamaican parents who moved to England in the 1960s as part of the Windrush generation. She studied at Fairfield Secondary School and then 6th Form at Cotham School.

== Career ==
While in sixth form Lewis made her television debut in the fifth series of E4's teen drama Skins, which started on 27 January 2011. She gained the role of Liv Malone through open auditions in Bristol. Members of the show's production team visited some of the local schools and she was asked to attend an audition. At the age of 16 she auditioned for the second generation of Skins, however when she arrived she decided not to participate as she thought she was too young and "wouldn't be very good".

In April 2012, Lewis starred in Emeli Sandé's music video "My Kind of Love", directed by Dawn Shadforth. It recounts the story of the ambiguous relationship of two female characters, and how the younger girl, played by Lewis, lives with cancer. In 2013 she filmed The Line, a short movie written and directed by BAFTA nominated Faye Gilbert about a teenage girl and young boy running for their lives in a futuristic world. Next Lewis will play the lead role of Beverly in Beverley, a short film produced by Cass Pennant telling the true story of a mixed-race girl growing up in the city of Leicester in the 1980s.

Laya once provided the idents for BBC Radio 1 Breakfast show with Nick Grimshaw. She has since continued to do VO work.

She won the BBC award for up and coming artist at the British Urban Film Festival.

== Filmography ==
Film and Television
| Year | Title | Role | Notes |
|---|---|---|---|
| 2011–2012 | Skins | Liv Malone | E4 TV series (18 episodes) |
| 2013 | The Line | | Short film |
| 2014 | Beverley | Beverly | Short film alongside Vicky McClure |
| 2014 | Cuckoo | Potato Girl | BBC Three TV series (1 episode No.2.2 Potato Party) |
| 2015 | Jekyll and Hyde | Cara | ITV TV series (2 episodes) |
| 2016 | Witless | Claudia | BBC Three TV series (1 episode No.1.1) |
| 2016 | Coyotes | Amber | Short film |
| 2019 | Bored | Naomi | Television film |
| 2021 | Temple | Hairstylist | Season 2, Episode 1 |
| 2023 | Queen Cleopatra | Eiras | Television miniseries |

Music Videos
| Year | Song | Artist | Director |
|---|---|---|---|
| 2012 | My Kind of Love | Emeli Sandé | Dawn Shadforth |
