= Will Merrick =

English actor (born 1993)

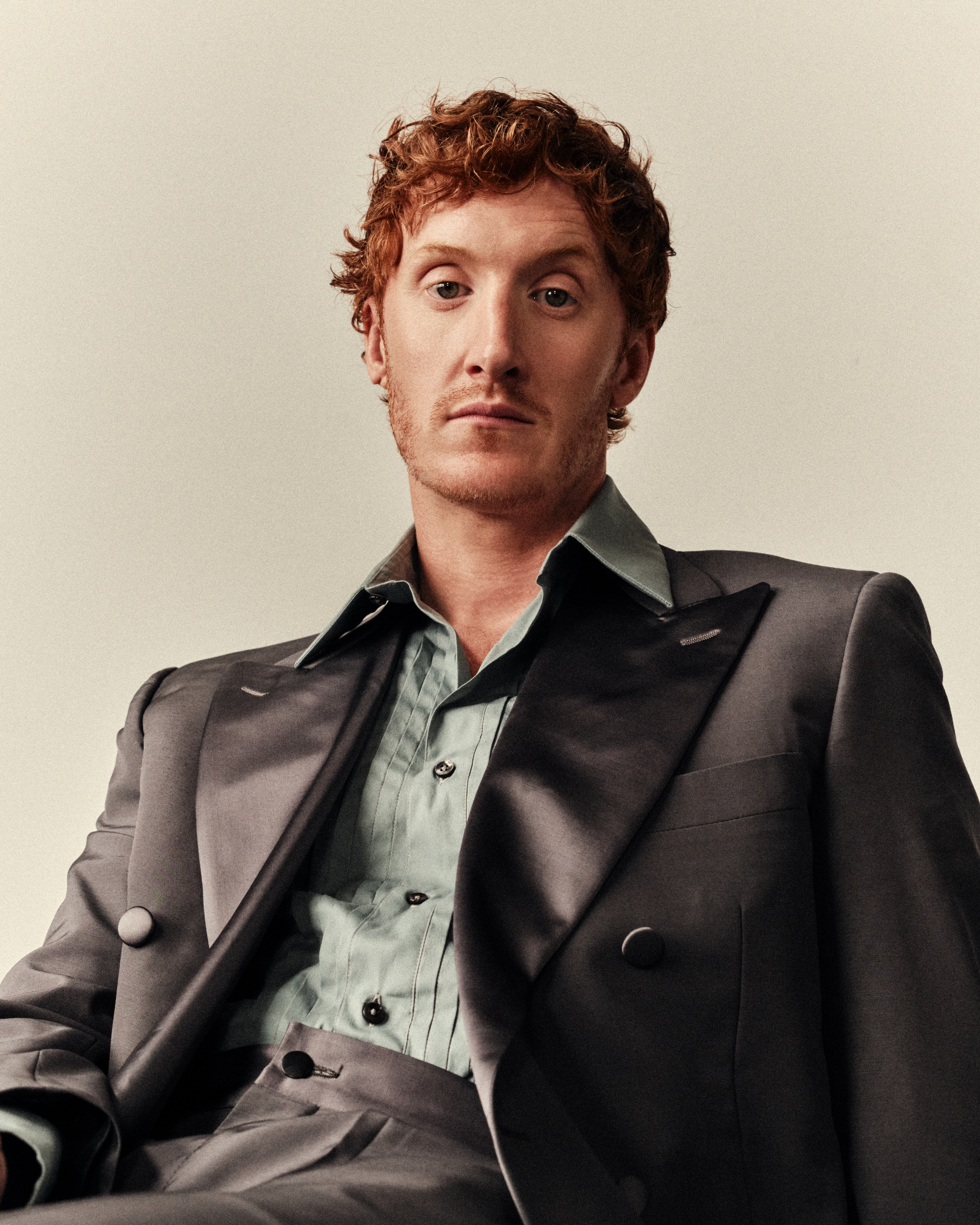
- Merrick in 2025
- Born: William Charles Merrick; 9 April 1993 (age 33); Ledbury, Herefordshire, England
- Education: The Downs School; Dean Close School
- Occupation: Actor
- Years active: 2009–present
- Known for: Skins (2011–2012); About Time (2013); The Rack Pack (2016); Brief Encounters (2016); Dead Pixels (2019)

William Charles Merrick (born 9 April 1993) is an English screen and stage actor. His debut was in the third generation of the BAFTA-winning E4 television series Skins, as the character Alo Creevey.

== Early life and education ==
Merrick originates from Ledbury in Herefordshire. He attended The Downs School, Malvern and Dean Close School. He came in the top ten of over 50,000 candidates for the 2009 drama GCSE examination.

== Career ==
As a member of the Close up Theatre, Merrick performed at the Edinburgh Festival Fringe 2010 and 2011, in the productions of The History Boys playing Posner and Arthur Miller's Death of a Salesman, playing Charley. At the Edinburgh Festival Fringe 2012–2013 Merrick started a theatre company No Prophet at the age of 18. With it he played roles in Punk Rock, a stage production by Simon Stephens, and Boys written by Ella Hickson.

In 2011, Merrick made his first television appearance in the E4 teen drama Skins, playing Alo Creevey, having auditioned for the role of Rich Hardbeck. He described his character as a "loving person, very open-minded, positive and enthusiastic kind of guy."

In February 2012, Merrick won the Royal Television Society Award for Best Actor, competing against Dakota Blue Richards, his Skins co-star. In the same year he was also nominated for Best Actor at TV Choice Awards.

In May 2012, Merrick recorded an episode of BBC One family sitcom In with the Flynns, in the role of Dean. In the same year he has landed his first big screen role as Jay in Richard Curtis' new romantic comedy About Time alongside Rachel McAdams and Domhnall Gleeson.

Merrick appeared in a 2013 episode Nightmare in Silver of Doctor Who in the role of Brains. He played the role of Tom, alongside Jessie Cave, in an episode of Coming Up aired on Channel 4 in July 2013 and was a guest star in BBC fantasy series Atlantis.

Merrick starred as snooker player Steve Davis in the 2016 BBC drama The Rack Pack. In 2016 Merrick played Butcher's apprentice Russell in the ITV drama series Brief Encounters. He played Arthur Solway in two episodes of BBC's Poldark. From 2019 to 2021 Merrick starred as gaming fanatic Nicky in the sitcom Dead Pixels.

== Film ==
| Year | Title | Role | Notes |
|---|---|---|---|
| 2013 | About Time | Jay | Director: Richard Curtis |
| 2017 | Modern Life Is Rubbish | Olly | |
| 2021 | A Classic Horror Story | | |
| 2023 | Barbie | Young Mattel Employee | |
| 2025 | F1 | Hugh Nickleby | |
| 2026 | Resident Evil | Dave | |

== Television ==
| Year | Title | Role | Platform | Notes |
|---|---|---|---|---|
| 2011–2012 | Skins | Alo Creevey | E4 | 17 episodes Won—RTS Award for Best Actor; Nominated—TV Choice Award for Best Actor |
| 2012 | In with the Flynns | Dean | BBC One | 1 episode "Frozen Assets" No.2.6 |
| 2013 | Doctor Who | Brains | BBC One | Series 7, 1 episode No.3.13 "Nightmare in Silver" |
| 2013 | Coming Up | Tom | Channel 4 | 1 episode No.8.2 "Burger Van Champion" |
| 2013 | Atlantis | Arcas | BBC One | 1 episode No.1.8 "The Furies" |
| 2015 | Count Arthur Strong | Jeremy | BBC Two | 1 episode No. 2.2 "The Day The Clocks Went Back" |
| 2016 | Brief Encounters | Russell | ITV | 6 episodes |
| 2016 | The Rack Pack | Steve Davis | BBC iPlayer | 1 episode |
| 2017 | Poldark | Arthur Solway | BBC One | 2 episodes |
| 2019–2021 | Dead Pixels | Nicky | E4 | 12 episodes |
| 2023 | Silo | Danny | Apple TV+ | 2 episodes |
| 2023 | Bodies | Constable Byrne | Netflix | 3 episodes |
| 2023 | Miss Scarlet and the Duke | Martin Crabtree | Alibi / PBS | 1 episode "The Heir" |
| 2026 | Zog | Sir Gadabout the Great (voice) | BBC / CBeebies | 52 episodes |

== Theatre ==
| Year | Title | Role | Notes |
|---|---|---|---|
| 2009 | The Taming of the Shrew | Grumio | Close Up Theatre |
| 2009 | Amadeus | Venticello | Close Up Theatre |
| 2010 | Hamlet | Polonius | Close Up Theatre |
| 2010 | The History Boys | Posner | Edinburgh Festival Fringe |
| 2011 | Death of a Salesman | Charley | Edinburgh Festival Fringe |
| 2012 | Punk Rock | William Carlisle | Edinburgh Festival Fringe |
| 2013 | Boys | Benny | Edinburgh Festival Fringe; Arcola Theatre |
| 2013–2014 | Wendy & Peter Pan | Slightly | Royal Shakespeare Company |
| 2014–2015 | Merlin | Merlin | Royal & Derngate |
| 2018 | Death of a Salesman | Bernard | Royal Exchange Theatre |

== Awards and nominations ==
| Year | Nominee / work | Award | Result |
|---|---|---|---|
| 2012 | Best Actor | Royal Television Society Award | Won |
| 2012 | Best Actor | TV Choice Awards | Nominated |
