= List of Skins characters =

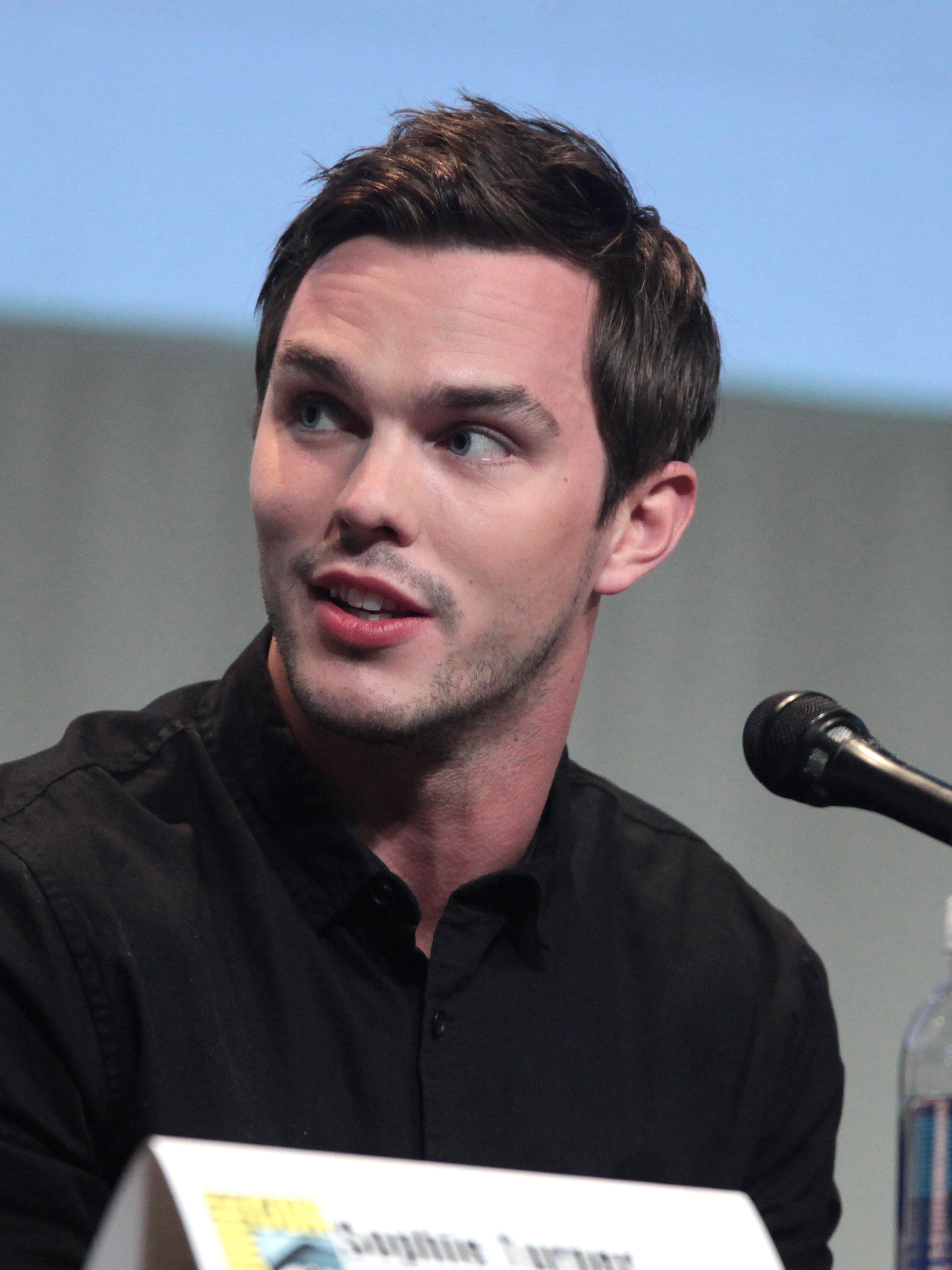
Nicholas Hoult

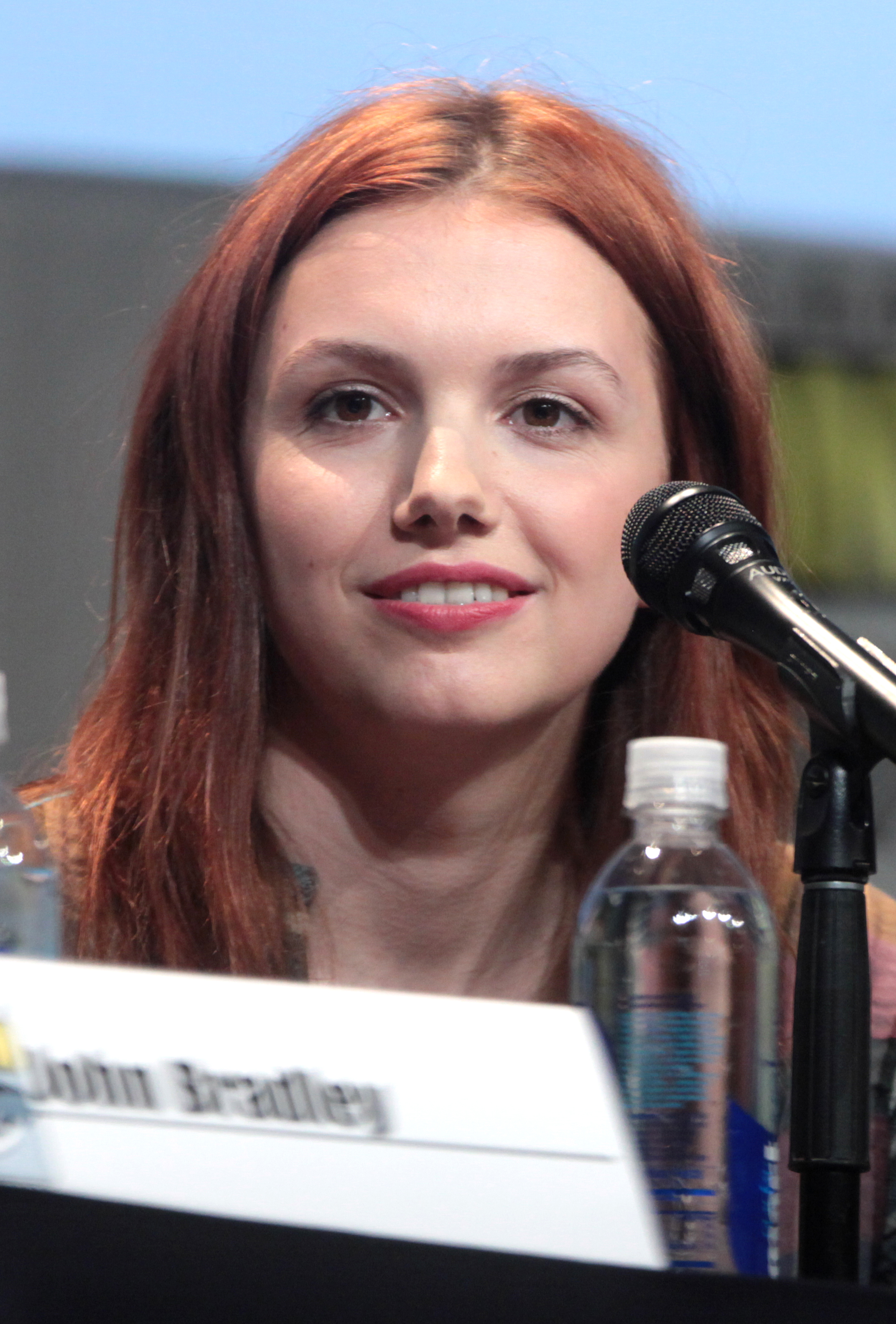
Hannah Murray

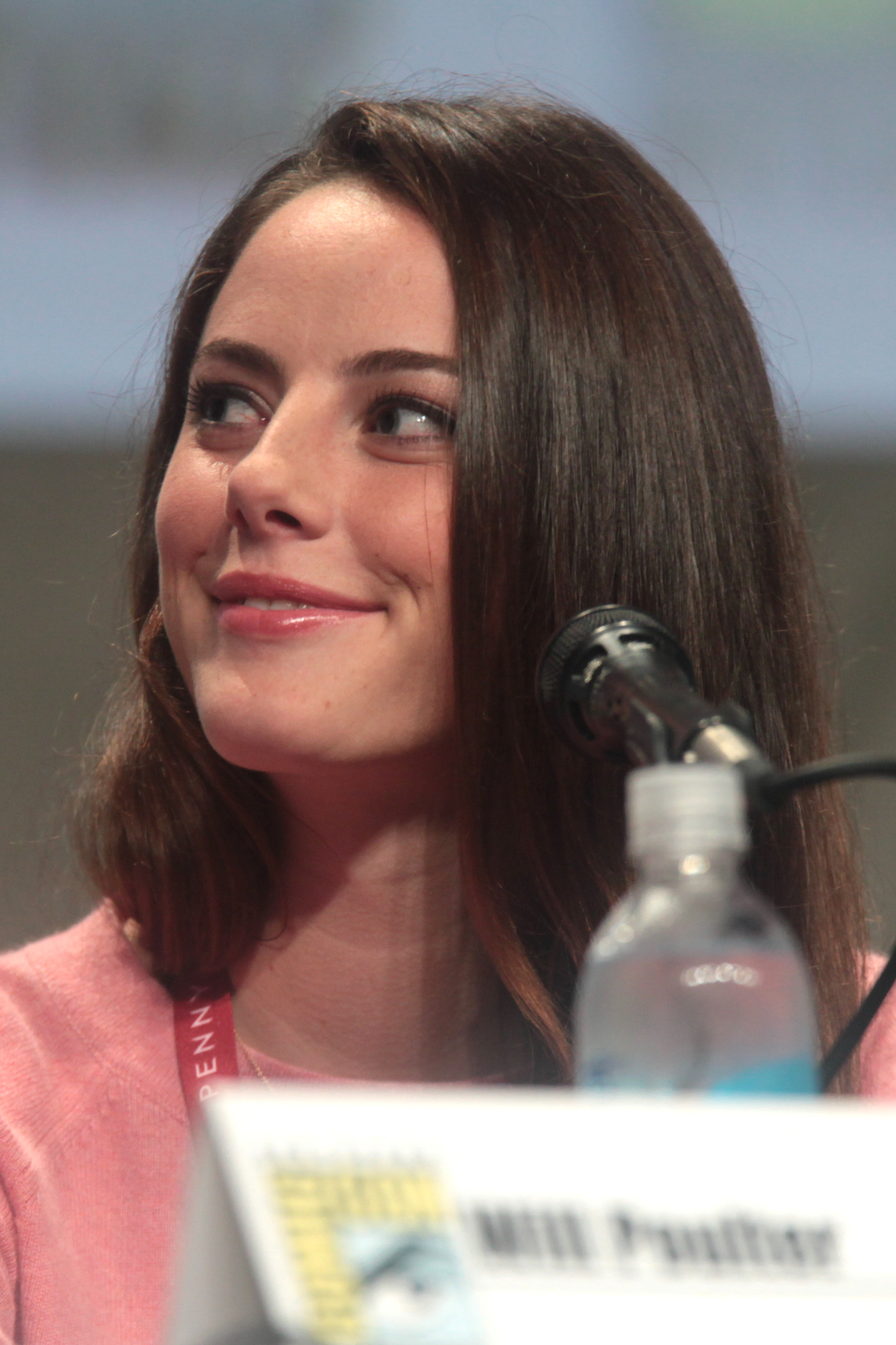
Kaya Scodelario

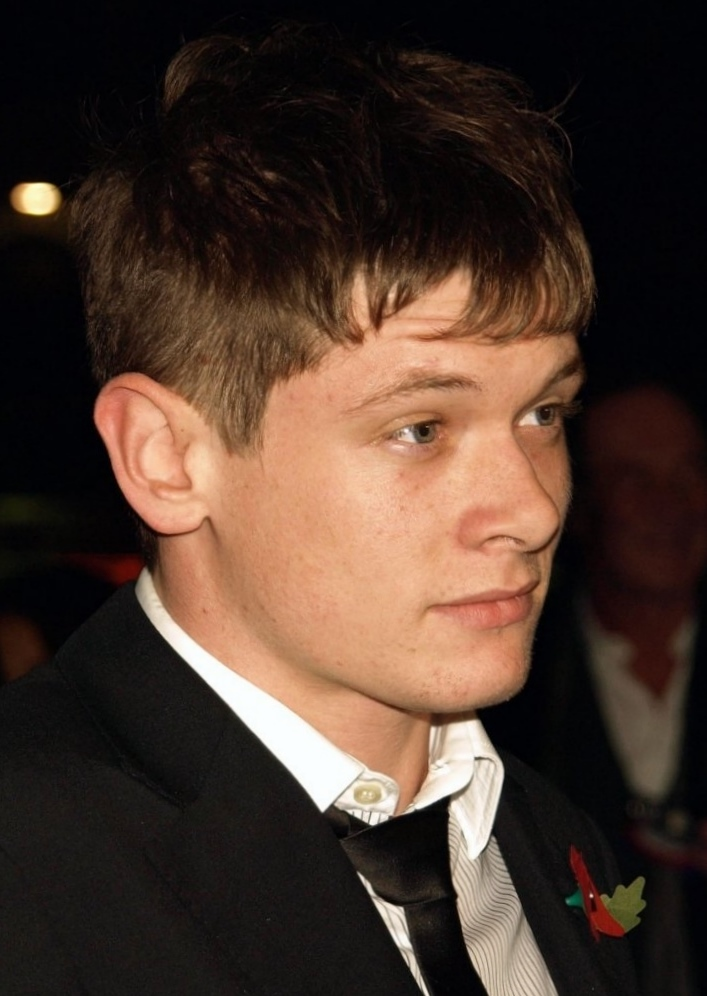
Jack O'Connell

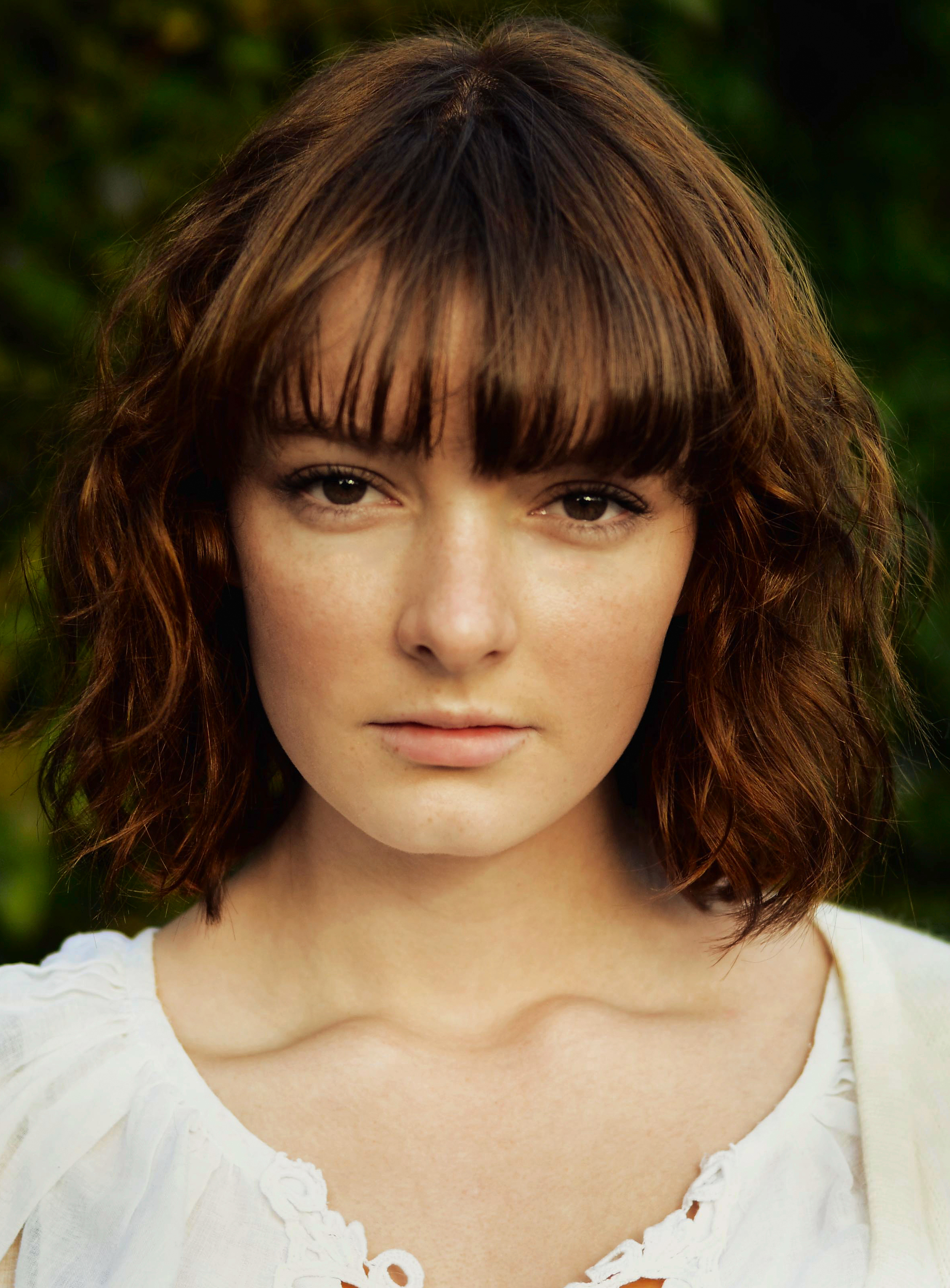
Dakota Blue Richards

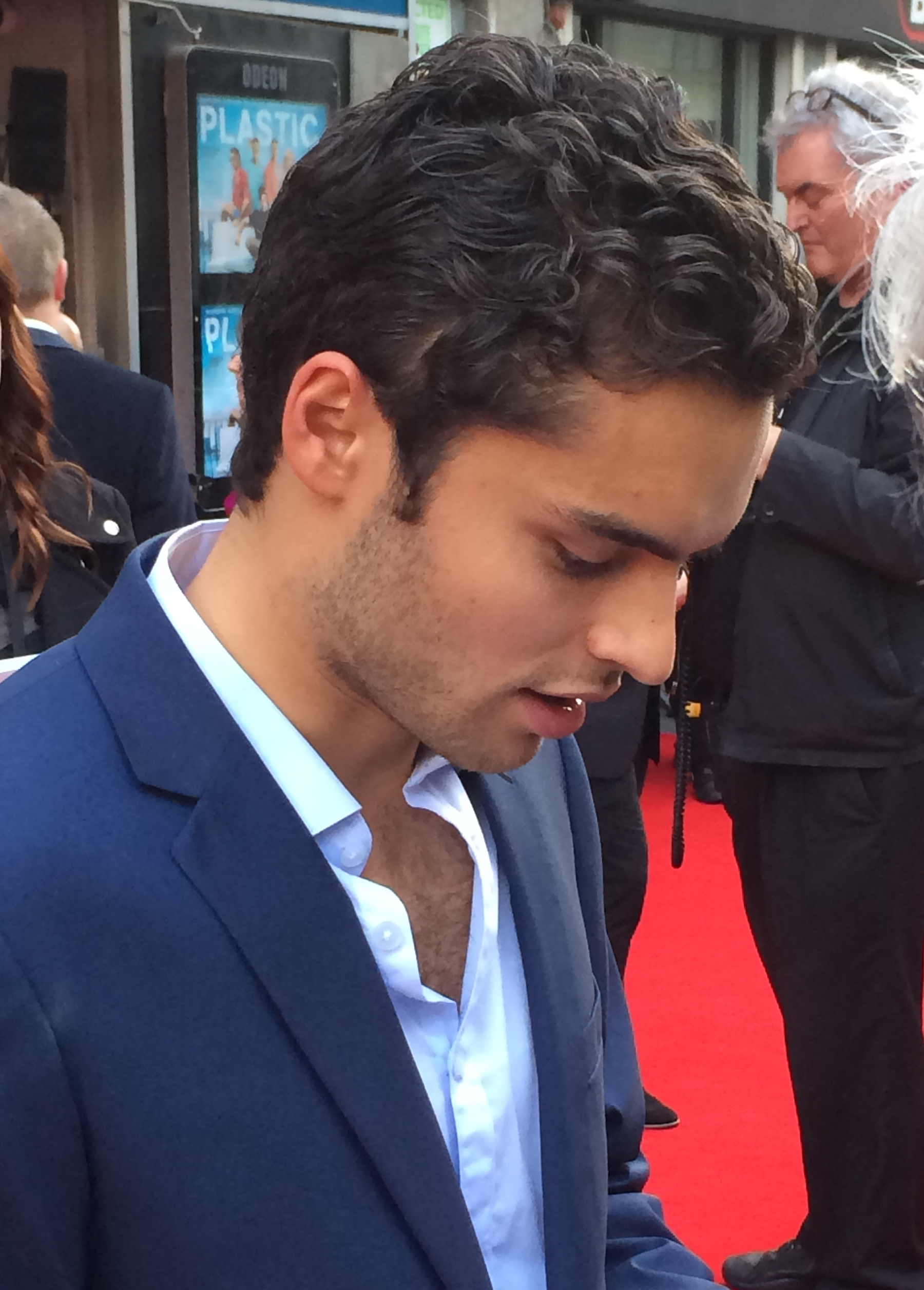
Sebastian de Souza

The British teen drama Skins follows the lives of a group of teenagers in Bristol, southwest England, through the two years of sixth form. Its controversial storylines have explored issues such as dysfunctional families, mental illness (such as depression, eating disorders, post-traumatic stress disorder, and bipolar disorder), adolescent sexuality, gender, substance abuse, death, and bullying.

Each episode generally focuses on a particular character or subset of characters and the struggles they face in their lives, with the episodes named after the featured characters. The show was created by father-and-son television writers Bryan Elsley and Jamie Brittain for Company Pictures.

== Overview ==
| Character | Portrayed by (Note: The main cast of the first six seasons is composed of the actors disclosed in the promotional images of each season.) | Seasons | | | | | | | | |
| Character | Portrayed by | 1st generation | | 2nd generation | | 3rd generation | | Season 7 (Note: Season seven is led by just three actors, but the main cast is made up of all the actors credited at the beginning of each episode.) | | |
| Character | Portrayed by | 1 | 2 | 3 | 4 | 5 | 6 | Fire | Pure | Rise |
|---|---|---|---|---|---|---|---|---|---|---|
| Tony Stonem | Nicholas Hoult | Main | Main | | | | | | | |
| Chris Miles | Joe Dempsie | Main | Main | | | | | | | |
| Cassie Ainsworth | Hannah Murray | Main | Main | | | | | | Main | |
| Sid Jenkins | Mike Bailey | Main | Main | | | | | | | |
| Jal Fazer | Larissa Wilson | Main | Main | | | | | | | |
| Michelle Richardson | April Pearson | Main | Main | | | | | | | |
| Anwar Kharral | Dev Patel | Main | Main | | | | | | | |
| Maxxie Oliver | Mitch Hewer | Main | Main | | | | | | | |
| Lucy Sketch | Aimee-Ffion Edwards | | Main | | | | | | | |
| Effy Stonem | Kaya Scodelario | Recurring | Recurring | Main | Main | | | Main | | |
| Pandora Moon | Lisa Backwell | | Guest | Main | Main | | | | | |
| JJ Jones | Ollie Barbieri | | | Main | Main | | | | | |
| James Cook | Jack O'Connell | | | Main | Main | | | | | Main |
| Naomi Campbell | Lily Loveless | | | Main | Main | | | Also Starring | | |
| Emily Fitch | Kathryn Prescott | | | Main | Main | | | Also Starring | | |
| Katie Fitch | Megan Prescott | | | Main | Main | | | | | |
| Thomas Tomone | Merveille Lukeba | | | Main | Main | | | | | |
| Freddie McClair | Luke Pasqualino | | | Main | Main | | | | | |
| Franky Fitzgerald | Dakota Blue Richards | | | | | Main | Main | | | |
| Rich Hardbeck | Alexander Arnold | | | | | Main | Main | | | |
| Mini McGuinness | Freya Mavor | | | | | Main | Main | | | |
| Liv Malone | Laya Lewis | | | | | Main | Main | | | |
| Nick Levan | Sean Teale | | | | | Main | Main | | | |
| Alo Creevey | Will Merrick | | | | | Main | Main | | | |
| Grace Blood | Jessica Sula | | | | | Main | Main | | | |
| Matty Levan | Sebastian de Souza | | | | | Main | Main | | | |
| Alex Henley | Sam Jackson | | | | | | Main | | | |
| Jake Abbasi | Kayvan Novak | | | | | | | Also Starring | | |
| Victoria | Lara Pulver | | | | | | | Also Starring | | |
| Dominic "Dom" | Craig Roberts | | | | | | | Also Starring | | |
| Marcus Ainsworth | Neil Morrissey | Guest | | | | | | | Also Starring | |
| Jakob | Olly Alexander | | | | | | | | Also Starring | |
| Yaniv | Daniel Ben Zenou | | | | | | | | Also Starring | |
| Maddie | Charlene McKenna | | | | | | | | Also Starring | |
| Louie | Liam Boyle | | | | | | | | | Also Starring |
| Emma | Esther Smith | | | | | | | | | Also Starring |
| Jason | Lucien Laviscount | | | | | | | | | Also Starring |
| Charlote "Charlie" | Hannah Britland | | | | | | | | | Also Starring |

== First generation ==
| Name | Actor | Series featured | Centric episodes |
|---|---|---|---|
| Anthony "Tony" Stonem | Nicholas Hoult | 1–2 | 1.01, 1.09, 2.01, 2.06, 2.10 |
Tony represents the dream of every parent, except, perhaps, his own; he is academically talented, handsome, loved by all his friends and their parents and often gets his own way. Despite this, his centric episode reveals he has a much darker side to his personality, and his manipulative ways go unnoticed by many for some time. He dates Michelle, and although he cheats on her with Abigail, many other girls and Maxxie, he expresses his love for her. Immediately after admitting this, he is hit by a bus, leaving him mentally impaired and unable to recall certain events or people. After working long and ceaselessly, Tony slowly regains his memories and abilities. He also cares a lot for Effy because she loves him for who he really is. He reconciles with Michelle and Sid at the end of series two. Family: Father, Jim Stonem (Harry Enfield); mother, Anthea Stonem (Morwenna Banks); sister, Effy Stonem (Kaya Scodelario)
| Michelle Richardson | April Pearson | 1–2 | 1.07, 1.09, 2.04, 2.10 |
Michelle is Tony's girlfriend, even though Sid has a crush on her, which she is well aware of. Despite her lack of interest in academics, she is a talented linguist and appears to be fluent in French and Spanish. She breaks up with Tony after she sees him cheating on her with Maxxie. At the end of the first series, Tony confesses his love for her before being hit by a bus. After the accident, which leaves Tony without memory of his feelings for her, Michelle tries many times to get him to remember, but eventually gives up and begins seeing Sid instead. After Tony remembers his affection for her and lets her know this, Michelle admits that she loves him as well, and they get back together. Family: Mother, Anna Richardson (Arabella Weir); ex-stepfather, Malcolm (Danny Dyer); stepfather, Ted (Tim Wallers); stepsister Scarlett (daughter of Ted) (Sia Berkeley)
| Sidney "Sid" Jenkins | Mike Bailey | 1–2 | 1.05, 1.09, 2.03, 2.10 |
Sid is desperate to lose his virginity, and his love for Michelle makes him oblivious to Cassie's affection for him. Cassie's feelings are revealed to Sid, and the two begin a long-distance relationship when Cassie moves to Scotland. They split up briefly when Sid cheats on her with Michelle, but then reunite. When Cassie runs away to New York, Sid follows her. Sid admires Tony, although this admiration wavers towards the end of the first series as he realises how Tony has manipulated him. He and Tony continue to have a falling out throughout much of series 1 and 2, but they eventually patch up their relationship. Family: Father, Mark Jenkins (Peter Capaldi); mother, Elizabeth "Liz" Jenkins (Josie Lawrence); grandfather, Alex (Maurice Roëves); uncle, Sandy (Michael Nardone); cousins, Lex (Jonny Forrest) and Ally Jenkins (Bryan Wilson)
| Cassandra "Cassie" Ainsworth | Hannah Murray | 1–2, 7 | 1.02, 1.09, 2.09, 2.10, 7.03, 7.04 |
After suffering from an eating disorder, Cassie is admitted to a rehab clinic. She harbours a deep affection for Sid and eventually they get together. They go through a rough period when Sid believes that Cassie was unfaithful during her stay in Scotland. She worries about the different futures they will have after college. After witnessing Chris's death, she flees to New York, soon to be followed by Sid. Family: Father, Marcus Ainsworth (Neil Morrissey); mother, Margeritte Ainsworth (Naomi Allisstone); infant brother, Reuben Ainsworth (portrayed by Bobby Pearse)
| Christopher "Chris" Miles | Joe Dempsie | 1–2 | 1.04, 1.09, 2.05 |
Chris is the teenage party animal. After his mother leaves unexpectedly, he is forced to live on campus in student lodging. His crush on psychology teacher Angie leads to a relationship, despite Angie's uneasiness with the situation. Chris is eventually expelled from college, consequently forcing him out of student housing and into a job. He becomes interested in Jal, and the two become involved in a relationship, despite having to overcome some problems dealing with Angie. Jal becomes pregnant with his baby. Chris dies from a subarachnoid haemorrhage in the ninth episode of series two. Family: Estranged father, Graham Miles (Mark Heap); estranged mother, Chris's mum (Annie Hulley); stepmother, Mary Miles (Sarah Lancashire); deceased brother, Peter Miles; infant half-brother, Sammy Miles (portrayed by unknown)
| Jalander "Jal" Fazer | Larissa Wilson | 1–2 | 1.03, 1.09, 2.08, 2.10 |
Jal is a musician who plays the clarinet. She spends much of her time practicing for the Musician of the Year, but does not win. She lives with her father, a well known celebrity, and two brothers, Lynton and Ace. She and her father do not have a very close relationship, mostly because Jal feels her father ignores her completely. She grows a fondness for Chris, and after the two become a couple, she becomes pregnant with his baby, but she later aborts it. Family: Father, Ronny Fazer (Mark Monero); estranged mother, Jal's Mother (Josette Simon); brothers, Ace Fazer (Troy Glasgow) and Lynton Fazer (Adrian Fergus Fuller)
| Maxxie Oliver | Mitch Hewer | 1–2 | 1.06, 1.09, 2.01, 2.10 |
Maxxie is an openly gay character who has an affinity for dance. He has expressed to his parents on several occasions that he does not wish to further his studies in college, but wants to pursue a dancing career. He is stalked by Sketch, who – when unable to achieve Maxxie's attention – dates Anwar and attempts to turn him into a clone of Maxxie. Family: Father, Walter Oliver (Bill Bailey); mother, Jackie Oliver (Fiona Allen)
| Anwar Kharral | Dev Patel | 1–2 | 1.06, 1.09, 2.10 |
Anwar is a horny, sex-crazed Muslim character with a dominating family, and is criticized because of his selective approach to his faith: he attributes his dislike of gay people to the Quran, but has no qualms about sex, alcohol, or drugs. He engages in a sexual relationship with Sketch, even though Maxxie disapproves of their relationship. Sketch attempts to change Anwar into a clone of Maxxie, but when Anwar finds out, he dumps her. Family: Father, Istiak Kharral (Inder Manocha); mother, Bibi Kharral (Nina Wadia); uncle, Muneer (Nish Nathwani); three older, unnamed sisters
| Lucy Sketch | Aimee-Ffion Edwards | 2 | 2.02, 2.10 |
Sketch lives with her mother, who has multiple sclerosis, in the same block of flats as Maxxie. She stalks and dangerously obsesses over him, and tells her mother that Maxxie is her boyfriend, despite the fact that he is gay. Maxxie reveals to Sketch that he has no interest in her, so Sketch sleeps with and dates Anwar, attempting to turn him into a clone of Maxxie. Family: Mother, Sheila (Maria Miles)
| Elizabeth "Effy" Stonem | Kaya Scodelario | 1–4, 7 | 1.08, 2.07, 3.01, 3.08, 3.10, 4.07, 4.08, 7.01, 7.02 |
Enigmatic and elusive, Effy is attractive to all around her, utterly in control of herself and totally independent. Effy is the younger sister of Tony, one of the characters from the first two seasons of the series. In comparison to her initial mute personality of the first series, she has proven to be quite adventurous, open-minded and promiscuous. Family: Father, Jim Stonem (Harry Enfield); mother, Anthea Stonem (Morwenna Banks); brother, Tony Stonem (Nicholas Hoult)
| Posh Kenneth | Daniel Kaluuya | 1–3 | |
Posh Kenneth is a posh, charismatic Black British character, who performed as a rapper. One of his chief characteristics is his code-switching between British English sociolects. He is good friends with Anwar and spends a lot of time with the group.
| Abigail Stock | Georgina Moffat | 1–2 | |
Abigail is a posh girl who goes to an independent school that Effy is eventually sent to. Tony often cheats on Michelle with her. After Tony's accident at the end of series one, Abigail pretends to have been his girlfriend before the accident, however, Sid later reveals this is a lie and ends the relationship. Family: Mother, Dr Stock (Heidi Monsen); brother, Josh Stock (Ben Lloyd-Hughes)
| Angie | Siwan Morris | 1–2 | |
Angie is the gang's psychology teacher, who has an affair with Chris. When she arrives to one of his parties, Chris gives her a hug and convinces her to dance with him. Because Chris has taken several viagras, Angie mistakes his erection to be caused by her. Regardless, they end up in a relationship midway through the series, which Angie is ashamed of. It is later revealed that Angie was engaged, but was separated from her fiancee. She later leaves him and breaks off her relationship with Chris. She appears one more time in Chris' central episode in series two where she has sex with him, despite the fact he is in a relationship with Jal.

== Second generation ==
| Name | Actor | Series featured | Centric episodes |
|---|---|---|---|
| Elizabeth "Effy" Stonem | Kaya Scodelario | 1–4, 7 | 1.08, 2.07, 3.01, 3.08, 3.10, 4.07, 4.08, 7.01, 7.02 |
Enigmatic and elusive, Effy's the queen bee – attractive to all around her, utterly in control of herself and totally independent. Effy is Tony's younger sister and Pandora's best friend, despite their conflicting personalities. In comparison to her initial mute personality in the first series, she has proven to be quite adventurous, open-minded and promiscuous. In the third series, Effy is shocked to discover that her mother has been having an affair with her father's boss, which turns out to be the reason why her parents get divorced. Effy becomes involved in a love triangle with Cook and Freddie. However – eventually, she chooses Freddie and admits that she has fallen in love with him. In series four, Effy and Freddie begin an official relationship. Meanwhile, Effy establishes a close friendship with Katie – leaving behind the previous hostility and bitterness that they felt for each other. After showing signs of manic behaviour, she is diagnosed with psychotic depression and attempts to commit suicide, but Freddie is able to find her in time and saves her life. Effy receives medical treatment in a psychiatric hospital and slowly begins recovering from her mental illness with the help of her mother, close friends, and psychiatrist, the latter of which murders Freddie. Family: Father, Jim Stonem (Harry Enfield); mother, Anthea Stonem (Morwenna Banks); brother, Tony Stonem (Nicholas Hoult) Note: Kaya Scodelario is the longest-serving main cast member of the series, appearing in 27 episodes of the series overall. She served as a recurring character in the first two series, before becoming a main character in series 3 and 4. She returned in the two-part episode Skins: Fire in the seventh and final series.
| Pandora Moon | Lisa Backwell | 2–4 | 3.01, 3.04, 4.08 |
Pandora is Effy's naïve and immature friend. She was introduced in a guest appearance in series two. In series three, Pandora falls in love with Thomas, but after he is forced to return to the Congo, she loses her virginity to – and enters a sexual affair with – Cook. Thomas returns, is devastated when he learns of her infidelity, and thereafter is miserable in his relationship. In series four, Thomas sleeps with a member of his church, which leads to another breakup between him and Pandora. Due to excellent results in her exams, Pandora is accepted on a history scholarship at Harvard University. In the final episode, it is implied that another reconciliation will occur between her and Thomas. Family: Mother, Angela Moon (Sally Phillips); aunt, Elizabeth (Maureen Lipman); supposed father, Professor Larbalestier (Darren Boyd)
| Thomas Tomone | Merveille Lukeba | 3–4 | 3.03, 4.01, 4.08 |
Friendly, honest and spiritual, Thomas is an immigrant from the Congo. Due to his African upbringing, he finds it difficult to understand and adjust to the British way of life. In series three, he encounters trouble in Johnny White, a local gangster. Through his efforts to defeat Johnny, Thomas forms a close bond with Pandora. Soon after, he is forced to go back to the Congo. When he returns, Thomas continues to date Pandora until he finds out that she has been cheating on him with Cook; but eventually, he forgives her. In series four, Thomas is expelled from college for his involvement in Sophia's death. Feeling depressed, he distances himself from Pandora and has sex with a fellow member of his African church community. When Pandora learns the truth, she ends their relationship. Thomas has a brief flirtation with Katie, although they decide to just remain friends when Thomas admits his remaining feelings for Pandora. In the final episode, Thomas and Pandora appear to be friendly with each other again and he tells her that he will be attending Harvard University on an athletic scholarship. Family: Mother, Kosoke Tomone (Aicha Kossoko); sister, Fumi Tomone (Evelyn Madzima); brother, Daniel Tomone (Domonic Attoh)
| James Cook | Jack O'Connell | 3–4, 7 | 3.01, 3.02, 3.10, 4.03, 4.08, 7.05, 7.06 |
Impulsive and eccentric, Cook loves to have a good time and is constantly the life and soul of any party. Cook shows a great interest in the ladies, and all his partying routinely gets out of hand, leading him into trouble. At first he is good friends with Freddie and JJ, but his sexual relationship with Effy gets between them. Although Effy chooses to be with Freddie eventually, and Cook has renewed his friendship with JJ and Freddie, his feelings for Effy remain strong. After seeing Freddie and Effy together at a party, Cook takes out his frustration on a guy standing near him, leaving the guy in hospital. Cook is charged with GBH and is brought to court, where he pleads guilty. He is sent to prison but escapes. He then evades the police, hiding in various friends' houses. At the climax of series four, Cook discovers Freddie's blood-soaked belongings, and confronts John Foster. He describes himself as what he is, a reckless, seemingly useless individual, and in what appears to be a final act, shouts his name Cook and lunges at Foster, ending the series, killing him as revealed in series seven. Family: Estranged mother, Ruth Byatt (Tanya Franks); estranged father, Cook Sr. (Matt King); brother, Paddy (William Lang); uncle, Keith (Geoffrey Hughes)
| Frederick "Freddie" McClair | Luke Pasqualino | 3–4 | 3.01, 3.05, 3.10, 4.05 |
Freddie is friends with Cook and JJ. He smokes weed with Cook and JJ, skateboards, and hangs out with them in his backyard shed. However, his shed is eventually turned into a dance studio for his sister Karen without his permission, spicing up family tensions. He briefly forms a sexual relationship with Katie, although it becomes clear he and Effy love each other; they eventually begin a relationship in series four. This is threatened when Effy deals with mental health issues and attempts suicide, which is revealed to be how his mother died. Near the end of series four, Freddie is beaten and killed by Effy's counsellor, John Foster. The final episode features the gang investigating his disappearance, and it is Cook who discovers that he has been murdered. Family: Father, Leo McClair (Simon Day); sister, Karen McClair (Klariza Clayton); grandfather, Norman (Dudley Sutton)
| Jonah Jeremiah "JJ" Jones | Ollie Barbieri | 3–4 | 3.01, 3.07, 3.10, 4.06, 4.08 |
JJ has a huge imagination, which is shown by his enthusiasm for magic. With his childlike excitement, he is known to create his own entertaining schemes. JJ is well-spoken and has a vast knowledge in Maths and Science, but he lacks basic social skills due to having Asperger's syndrome. Because of his disorder, JJ's behaviour can be rather unpredictable and he needs a constant large supply of medications. He is best friends with Freddie and Cook, who always help him whenever he is in any kind of trouble. In series three, JJ is stuck in the middle when Cook and Freddie fight over Effy. He tries to fix their friendship on many occasions to no avail. He develops a close friendship with Emily and she allows him to lose his virginity to her as a "one-time charity event". In series four, JJ finds love with Lara Lloyd, a single mother and bonds with her baby son, Albert. Through their relationship, JJ discovers a new-found confidence in himself and he begins to doubt whether he really needs to be so highly medicated for his whole life. Family: Mother, Celia Jones (Juliet Cowan); father, Edward Jones (Douglas Hodge)
| Naomi Campbell | Lily Loveless | 3–4, 7 | 3.01, 3.06, 4.08 |
Naomi is a passionate, political, and principled individualist. She questions her sexual orientation at the beginning of series three and later enters a relationship with Emily, despite many obstacles such as Emily's sexual act with JJ, Naomi's insecurity with her sexuality and Emily's family taking a dislike to her. After cheating on Emily with Sophia, and furthermore after Sophia commits suicide, their relationship becomes strained but they reunite in the final episode of series four. However, her ideals and principles diminished years after in series seven, as she ends up unemployed and living in a flat with Effy; with only her ambition being a stand-up comedian. She develops a form of cancer, which she hides from Emily. As her condition becomes terminal, Emily discovers the truth and chooses to stay by her side in her deathbed. Family: Mother, Gina Campbell (Olivia Colman)
| Katherine "Katie" Fitch | Megan Prescott | 3–4 | 3.01, 3.09, 4.04, 4.08 |
Katie tries to shed Emily duality and seemingly trampling on her as she does so. Although she is initially shaken by Emily's lesbianism, she eventually accepts it, but is hesitant to embrace Naomi. Although she is one of the more popular girls at Roundview, she is heavily disliked because of her dominant, nasty, and selfish personality, making her close to nobody in the gang. In series three, Katie tries numerous attempts to become Effy's best friend, which evidently doesn't go so well. When Freddie attempts to move on from Effy, he rebounds with Katie, which inevitably fails. In series 4, after learning of her parents' financial woes, she attempts to help her mother with a wedding planning business. However, when this fails due to Katie getting them fired, she is forced to move with her family into Naomi's house, much to her chagrin. She also learns that she went through a premature menopause, rendering her infertile. By the fourth series, Katie has a change in attitude and becomes much more respected by the gang and a source of strong support for Effy. Family: Father, Rob Fitch (John Bishop); mother, Jenna Fitch (Ronni Ancona); twin sister, Emily Fitch (Kathryn Prescott); brother, James Fitch (Redd Smith)
| Emily Fitch | Kathryn Prescott | 3–4, 7 | 3.01, 3.09, 4.02, 4.08 |
With her quiet and introverted personality, Emily is often bullied and taken advantage of by her dominant twin sister and depends on Katie to be the dynamic one. As the series progresses, she begins to come out of her shell and strives for individuality. She began the series as a closeted lesbian, but eventually comes out to her friends and loved ones, including Naomi, with whom she is in love. She develops a friendship with JJ, and allows him to lose his virginity with her, despite her sexual orientation. This, among other issues including Naomi cheating on Emily, causes problems between the couple over series three and four although they reunite in the final episode of series four. She is angered by the lies Naomi told her in series seven about her terminal cancer, but stays by her side as she dies. Family: Father, Rob Fitch (John Bishop); mother, Jenna Fitch (Ronni Ancona); twin sister, Katie Fitch (Megan Prescott); brother, James Fitch (Redd Smith).

== Third generation ==
| Name | Actor | Series featured | Centric episodes |
|---|---|---|---|
| Francesca "Franky" Fitzgerald | Dakota Blue Richards | 5–6 | 5.01, 5.08, 6.01, 6.04, 6.09, 6.10 |
Franky is described as a smart, creative girl. She has come from Oxford to attend Roundview College due to recurrent bullying, as seen in photos on her social networking site in the first episode. Franky struggles to fit in at her new school, due to her androgynous dress-sense; but befriends Liv, Mini and Grace, though she is very wary of Mini. Despite making friends, Franky realises that popularity will cost her individual image and personality and reverts to her old clothes. This causes a threatened Mini to turn her back on her and she forces Liv and Grace to shun Franky, though Grace goes against Mini and remains friends with both girls. Franky is shown to be a keen stop-motion animator and is the adopted daughter of two army men, giving her a knowledge of guns and possession of an air revolver. In series six, she undergoes relationship troubles with Matty, after losing her virginity to him; he is forced to remain in Morocco after a disastrous car crash which takes Grace's life, and Franky declares she hates him. She later enters into a violent relationship with Luke, the drug dealer responsible for Matty's road accident, and later Nick. When Matty returns, him and Nick clash over whom Franky really belongs with, but ultimately she decides not to date either of them. She also reunites with her sister, Clara, who takes her on an emotional visit to see her mother, who is in a mental hospital. Family: Adoptive fathers, Geoff (Gareth Farr) and Jeff (John Sessions); sister, Clara (Georgia King); mother, Maria (Caroline Paterson)
| Aloysius "Alo" Creevey | Will Merrick | 5–6 | 5.06, 5.08, 6.01, 6.07, 6.10 |
Alo spends most of his time hanging out with Rich in his van. He owns a dog named Rags and has an interest in a wide variety of pornography from throughout the ages. He is seen as unlucky with women and fails to find a girlfriend. In his centric episode, it is shown that Alo lives on a farm with his domineering mother and his 'doormat' father, who are dismayed by his party lifestyle and poor academic achievement. After his father ends up in hospital, Alo promises to work harder on the farm and in college so he isn't permanently pulled out. In series six, he and Mini start a no-strings-attached relationship resulting in Mini's pregnancy, unbeknownst to him until the penultimate episode of the season where he walks in on Mini having an ultrasound done. He is initially rejected by her, leading to his relationship with a 13-year-old girl. He initially did not want to have a baby, but after a talk with Rich decides to stand by Mini in her choice to keep the baby. He and Mini make up and end up together, and he is present for their daughter's birth by Mini's side. Family: Father, Owen (Peter Gunn); mother, Catherine (Ingrid Lacey); child, Grace
| Richard "Rich" Hardbeck | Alexander Arnold | 5–6 | 5.02, 5.08, 6.01, 6.02, 6.10 |
Richard "Rich" Hardbeck is a keen metalhead and Alo's best friend. His taste in heavy metal music occasionally causes consternation between the friends. Rich is very stubborn about what kind of girl he wants, and is largely unwilling to compromise, which causes problems when he begins to feel attracted to Grace. Additionally, his dress sense, like Franky's, draws a dim view from Mini, which causes him to be considered one of the "outcasts" of the show. However he starts dating Grace and in Alo's episode the two consummate their relationship. This forces Mini to accept him as part of the group. Later on in series five Rich proposes to Grace to protect her from her domineering father, but they soon decide to just stay in a relationship. In series 6, he has struggles coping with Grace's death, until the series finale where he finally lets go. Family: Father, Kevin (Daniel Ryan); mother, Anita (Liza Tarbuck)
| Minerva "Mini" McGuinness | Freya Mavor | 5–6 | 5.03, 5.08, 6.01, 6.05, 6.09, 6.10 |
Mini is the Queen bee of Grace and Liv, and the most popular girl at Roundview College. She is very fashion-oriented, and has a very materialistic outlook on life. Her confident, bitchy personality acts as a security mechanism to hide her obsession over her weight and lies about losing her virginity. The series begins with her and Nick dating; later episodes show Nick's infidelity with Liv, which leads to tension between herself, Nick and Liv. Mini's arrogance and unpleasantness begin to fade later in the series, and she develops a very close friendship with Franky. Her protectiveness of Franky in the final episode of series five leads Liv to imply that Mini may be attracted to Franky, which was hinted at in the latter half of the series. In series six, she begins a no strings attached sexual relationship with Alo which she makes him promise not to tell anyone. This eventually results in Mini falling pregnant in episode five of series six. After much decision making, she decides to keep the baby along with raising it and grows to love her baby very much. She gives birth to a daughter in the series finale, though she had complications with her pregnancy beginning in the ninth episode of the season. Family: Mother, Shelley (Clare Grogan); father, Gregory (Alastair Mackenzie); child, Grace
| Olivia "Liv" Malone | Laya Lewis | 5–6 | 5.04, 5.08, 6.01, 6.08, 6.10 |
Liv is introduced along with Mini and Grace as a clique of three, and is described in the show's publicity as a "party animal". She is considerably more impulsive than Grace or Mini, twice drinking a whole bottle of vodka just as a means of apology. In the third episode, she sleeps with Nick and begins a short lived fling with him which damages her friendship with Mini. In her centric episode we discover that she has a sci-fi obsessed younger sister, a sister in jail and a new-age mother who often neglects her children. She later starts a relationship with Matty but feels threatened by his obvious feelings for Franky. After Grace's death, she isolates herself from the rest of the group once Mini refuses to talk about it. She finds comfort in Alex, and parties frequently with him to cope with her pain. Once he goes away for a week, she has even more difficulty accepting her current situations and experiences a physical manifestation in her side. She comes to full acceptance of her death in the finale however as well as reconciliation with Mini and the group. Family: Mother, Agnes (Jaye Griffiths); sisters, Bella (Eloise Joseph) and Maude (Lola Mae Loughran)
| Grace Violet Blood | Jessica Sula | 5–6 | 5.07, 5.08, 6.01, 6.10 |
Grace is the third member of Mini's clique. She has come to Roundview College from an all-girls school and enjoys ballet and acting. Despite being told not to by Mini, Grace begins a friendship with Franky which causes tension amongst the group. She sympathises with Rich's plight to find a girlfriend, eventually showing her interest in him in the third episode. Further on in the series she begins a full-blown relationship with Rich. In her centric episode, it is revealed that her father is Professor Blood. Fearing that his position would be compromised if it was found out that Grace is attending Roundview, he makes her assume the persona of "Grace Violet". He tries to make her leave Roundview college to return to her previous school, but he eventually gives up on her and she decides that she and Rich should remain a couple, but not get married yet. In the sixth series, Grace is killed in a car crash while the gang is on holiday in Morocco, and, having been the glue that held the gang together, her death fractures it. However, she continues to reappear in mysterious visions to the rest of the gang during their times of greatest need, particularly Rich, Liv and Franky. Family: Father, David (Chris Addison); mother, Sonia (Jenny Jules)
| Nicholas "Nick" Levan | Sean Teale | 5–6 | 5.05, 5.08, 6.01, 6.06, 6.10 |
Nick plays rugby for the school team. He begins the series in a relationship with Mini, and is frequently annoyed by her refusal to sleep with him. Eventually he sleeps with Liv whilst still in a relationship with Mini and seems to show strong feelings for her. It is discovered that Matty is his brother and they have a domineering father, a self-help coach, who views Nick as his favourite son. Nick eventually quits the rugby team and shuns his arrogant friends in favour of a lifestyle filled with partying. In series six, he falls in love with Franky. She officially ends the relationship, however, in the series finale and he is reunited with Matty. Family: Father, Leon (Dorian Lough); mother, Siobhan; brother, Matty (Sebastian de Souza)
| Matthew "Matty" Levan | Sebastian de Souza | 5–6 | 5.08, 6.01, 6.10 |
Matty is introduced in the first episode, encountering a distraught Franky in an industrial estate and describing her as "beautiful". The first few episodes portray him as mysterious as he only makes a few brief appearances; his first significant role is in Liv's episode, where he is revealed to be Nick's brother. He and Liv begin a relationship but he cannot ignore his attraction to Franky. He moves back into the family home, despite his judgemental father. Eventually it seems that Liv cannot handle his feelings for Franky and they decide to end their relationship on friendly terms in the final episode of series five. He is involved in Grace's death in series six, causing his absence for the majority of the season and many troubles in his relationship with Franky and Nick. In the series finale, despite his feelings are reciprocated, Franky ends their relationship and he decides to hand himself into police accompanied by Nick. Family: Father, Leon (Dorian Lough); mother, Siobhan; brother, Nick (Sean Teale)
| Alexander "Alex" Henley | Sam Jackson | 6 | 6.03, 6.10 |
Alex is introduced in series six. He lives with his grandmother, who seems to have Alzheimer's, although she dies at the end of his episode. He is very impulsive and lives his life by rolling dice and performing actions that correspond to the number he rolled. He is also gay and an "outlandish flirt". He quickly makes friends with Liv and is introduced to the rest of the group. Alex kissed Nick in his episode. Jackson said that during his first day on set he had to portray a scene in which Alex is masturbating. The director asked him to make more noise during the scene, which Jackson said served as an "ice breaker". Jackson said that his friends presumed he was playing a straight character, and said he expected to be "ripped" for playing a gay character even though he could "handle the banter". Family: Grandmother, Miriam (Fenella Fielding); father, David (Karl Theobald); grandfather, William
