= List of Skins episodes =

British TV series

The following is a list of episodes of the British teen drama Skins. For a plot summary of the episodes, visit the main article of each series.

== Series overview ==
Series	Episodes	Originally released	
Series	Episodes	First released	Last released
1	9	25 January 2007	22 March 2007
2	10	11 February 2008	14 April 2008
3	10	22 January 2009	26 March 2009
4	8	28 January 2010	18 March 2010
5	8	27 January 2011	17 March 2011
6	10	23 January 2012	26 March 2012
7	6	1 July 2013	5 August 2013

== Episodes ==
=== Series 1 (2007) ===
No. overall	No. in series	Title	Featured character(s)	Directed by	Written by	Original release date	UK viewers (millions)
1	1	"Tony"	Tony Stonem	Paul Gay	Bryan Elsley	25 January 2007	1.54
2	2	"Cassie"	Cassie Ainsworth	Paul Gay	Bryan Elsley	1 February 2007	0.977
3	3	"Jal"	Jal Fazer	Adam Smith	Bryan Elsley	8 February 2007	0.91
4	4	"Chris"	Chris Miles	Adam Smith	Jack Thorne	15 February 2007	0.709
5	5	"Sid"	Sid Jenkins	Minkie Spiro	Jamie Brittain	22 February 2007	0.889
6	6	"Maxxie and Anwar"	Maxxie Oliver and Anwar Kharral	Chris Clough	Simon Amstell & Ben Schiffer	1 March 2007	0.808
7	7	"Michelle"	Michelle Richardson	Minkie Spiro	Bryan Elsley	8 March 2007	0.799
8	8	"Effy"	Effy Stonem	Adam Smith	Jack Thorne	15 March 2007	0.756
9	9	"Everyone"	Everyone	Adam Smith	Bryan Elsley	22 March 2007	0.797

=== Series 2 (2008) ===
No. overall	No. in series	Title	Featured character(s)	Directed by	Written by	Original release date	UK viewers (millions)
10	1	"Tony and Maxxie"	Tony Stonem and Maxxie Oliver	Aysha Rafaele	Bryan Elsley	11 February 2008	1.06
11	2	"Sketch"	Lucy Sketch	Aysha Rafaele	Jack Thorne	18 February 2008	0.757
12	3	"Sid"	Sid Jenkins	Simon Massey	Bryan Elsley	25 February 2008	0.767
13	4	"Michelle"	Michelle Richardson	Simon Massey	Sally Tatchell	3 March 2008	0.742
14	5	"Chris"	Chris Miles	Harry Enfield	Ben Schiffer	10 March 2008	0.709
15	6	"Tony"	Tony Stonem	Harry Enfield	Jamie Brittain	17 March 2008	0.751
16	7	"Effy"	Effy Stonem	Simon Massey	Lucy Kirkwood	24 March 2008	0.686
17	8	"Jal"	Jal Fazer	Simon Massey	Daniel Kaluuya	31 March 2008	0.686
18	9	"Cassie"	Cassie Ainsworth	Charles Martin	Bryan Elsley	7 April 2008	0.766
19	10	"Final Goodbyes"	Everyone	Charles Martin	Jack Thorne	14 April 2008	0.766

=== Series 3 (2009) ===
No. overall	No. in series	Title	Featured character(s)	Directed by	Written by	Original release date	UK viewers (millions)
20	1	"Everyone"	Everyone	Charles Martin	Bryan Elsley	22 January 2009	0.877
21	2	"Cook"	James Cook	Simon Massey	Jamie Brittain	29 January 2009	0.916
22	3	"Thomas"	Thomas Tomone	Simon Massey	Daniel Kaluuya & Bryan Elsley	5 February 2009	0.857
23	4	"Pandora"	Pandora Moon	Simon Massey	Georgia Lester & Bryan Elsley	12 February 2009	0.915
24	5	"Freddie"	Freddie McClair	Charles Martin	Ben Schiffer	19 February 2009	0.913
25	6	"Naomi"	Naomi Campbell	Simon Massey	Atiha Sen Gupta & Jack Thorne	26 February 2009	0.957
26	7	"JJ"	Jonah Jeremiah "JJ" Jones	Charles Martin	Bryan Elsley	5 March 2009	0.997
27	8	"Effy"	Effy Stonem	Charles Martin	Lucy Kirkwood	12 March 2009	0.864
28	9	"Katie and Emily"	Katie and Emily Fitch	Charles Martin	Malcolm Campbell & Bryan Elsley	19 March 2009	0.957
29	10	"Finale"	Effy Stonem, James Cook, JJ Jones and Freddie McClair	Simon Massey	Ben Schiffer	26 March 2009	0.972

=== Series 4 (2010) ===
No. overall	No. in series	Title	Featured character(s)	Directed by	Written by	Original release date	UK viewers (millions)
30	1	"Thomas"	Thomas Tomone	Neil Biswas	Jamie Brittain	28 January 2010	1.24
31	2	"Emily"	Emily Fitch	Philippa Langdale	Ed Hime	4 February 2010	1.02
32	3	"Cook"	James Cook	Philippa Langdale	Ben Schiffer	11 February 2010	0.954
33	4	"Katie"	Katie Fitch	Neil Biswas	Georgia Lester	18 February 2010	0.996
34	5	"Freddie"	Freddie McClair	Esther May Campbell	Sean Buckley	25 February 2010	0.941
35	6	"JJ"	Jonah Jeremiah "JJ" Jones	Esther May Campbell	Lucy Kirkwood	4 March 2010	0.885
36	7	"Effy"	Effy Stonem	Daniel O' Hara	Jamie Brittain	11 March 2010	0.863
37	8	"Everyone"	Everyone	Daniel O' Hara	Bryan Elsley	18 March 2010	0.902

=== Series 5 (2011) ===
No. overall	No. in series	Title	Featured character(s)	Directed by	Written by	Original release date	UK viewers (millions)
38	1	"Franky"	Franky Fitzgerald	Amanda Boyle	Sean Buckley	27 January 2011	1.03
39	2	"Rich"	Rich Hardbeck	Philippa Langdale	Jamie Brittain	3 February 2011	0.72
40	3	"Mini"	Mini McGuinness	Philippa Langdale	Georgia Lester	10 February 2011	0.741
41	4	"Liv"	Liv Malone	Amanda Boyle	Ed Hime	17 February 2011	0.661
42	5	"Nick"	Nick Levan	Jack Clough	Geoff Bussetil	24 February 2011	0.574
43	6	"Alo"	Alo Creevey	Jack Clough	Daniel Lovett	3 March 2011	0.588
44	7	"Grace"	Grace Blood	Dominic Leclerc	Jamie Brittain	10 March 2011	0.486
45	8	"Everyone"	Everyone	Dominic Leclerc	Sean Buckley	17 March 2011	0.494

=== Series 6 (2012) ===
No. overall	No. in series	Title	Featured character(s)	Directed by	Written by	Original release date	UK viewers (millions)
46	1	"Everyone"	Everyone	Jack Clough	Bryan Elsley	23 January 2012	1.032
47	2	"Rich"	Rich Hardbeck	Sam Donovan	Daniel Lovett	30 January 2012	0.655
48	3	"Alex"	Alex Henley	Sam Donovan	Jack Lothian	6 February 2012	0.720
49	4	"Franky"	Franky Fitzgerald	Ian Barnes	Sean Buckley	13 February 2012	0.741
50	5	"Mini"	Mini McGuinness	Ian Barnes	Jess Brittain	20 February 2012	0.661
51	6	"Nick"	Nick Levan	Jack Clough	Geoff Bussetil	27 February 2012	0.574
52	7	"Alo"	Alo Creevey	Benjamin Caron	Laura Hunter	5 March 2012	0.588
53	8	"Liv"	Liv Malone	Benjamin Caron	Ben Bond & Bryan Elsley	12 March 2012	0.486
54	9	"Mini and Franky"	Mini McGuinness and Franky Fitzgerald	Ian Barnes	Jess Brittain	19 March 2012	0.494
55	10	"Finale"	Everyone	Benjamin Caron	Georgia Lester	26 March 2012	0.574

=== Series 7 (2013) ===
No. overall	No. in series	Title	Featured character(s)	Directed by	Written by	Original release date	UK viewers (millions)
56	1	"Fire (Part 1)"	Effy Stonem	Charles Martin	Jess Brittain	1 July 2013	0.872
57	2	"Fire (Part 2)"	Effy Stonem	Charles Martin	Jess Brittain	8 July 2013	0.706
58	3	"Pure (Part 1)"	Cassie Ainsworth	Paul Gay	Bryan Elsley	15 July 2013	0.499
59	4	"Pure (Part 2)"	Cassie Ainsworth	Paul Gay	Bryan Elsley	22 July 2013	0.53
60	5	"Rise (Part 1)"	James Cook	Jack Clough	Jamie Brittain	29 July 2013	0.547
61	6	"Rise (Part 2)"	James Cook	Jack Clough	Jamie Brittain	5 August 2013	0.59

== Character video diaries ==
=== Series 1 (Generation 1) ===
Also to accompany the series, online video diaries were created for the following characters.

#	Title
1	"Jal's Video Diary"
Jal wants to show off her horny chihuahua: Jal's Video Diary – E4.com
2	"Chris's Video Diary"
Can Chris wear 72 socks?: Chris's Video Diary – E4.com
3	"Abigail's Video Diary"
Abigail hopes the people of 2107 are jolly well.: Abigail's Video Diary – E4.com
4	"Effy's Video Diary"
It's dark in Tony's sister's head. Very dark.: Effy's Video Diary – E4.com
5	"Maxxie's Video Diary"
Maxxie has heard a lot about this interweb thing, and has something very exciting to show you lucky people.: Maxxie's Video Diary – E4.com
6	"Michelle's Video Diary"
Michelle explains all about clothes for every occasion.: Michelle's Video Diary – E4.com
7	"Posh Kenneth's Video Diary"
"I hope you're getting on awfully well. We do not speak of grandmother's bunions.": Posh Kenneth's Video Diary – E4.com
8	"Tony's Video Diary"
Tony takes you on a tour of Bristol.: Tony's Video Diary – E4.com
9	"Sid's Video Diary"
Sid heads into final battle with the Danish warlord Wallothet.: Sid's Video Diary – E4.com
10	"Anwar's Video Diary"
It's not just about the fresh clothes and loads of money.: Anwar's Video Diary – E4.com
11	"Cassie's Video Diary"
Cassie's therapy video. She likes things that she likes, but she loves everything.: Cassie's Video Diary – E4.com

=== Series 3 (Generation 2) ===
The character video diaries functionally replaced Unseen Skins for the third series. A new diary was posted on the E4 website following the broadcast of each episode, and the diary often pertained to the events of that episode.

#	Title	Main episode
1	"JJ's Video Diary"	"Everyone"
JJ hits the streets of Bristol and posts his 'magic' diary on rateyourmagic. He wants to improve his magician skills.: JJ's Video Diary – E4.com
2	"Naomi's Video Diary"	"Cook"
Naomi is hungover and she still made it to the student rally.: Naomi's Video Diary – E4.com
3	"Pandora's Video Diary"	"Thomas"
Using Effy's webcam, Pandora sends Thomas a message.: Pandora's Video Diary – E4.com
4	"Freddie's Video Diary"	"Pandora"
Freddie decides to hijack his sister's Sexxbomb audition tape, with consequences he probably wasn't expecting.: Freddie's Video Diary – E4.com
5	"Karen's Video Diary"	"Freddie"
Karen's audition for Search for a Sexxbomb.: Karen's Video Diary – E4.com
6	"Cook's Video Diary"	"Naomi"
Cook stars in his very own campaign video whilst eating a sandwich, smearing his opponent Naomi Campbell and making some bold claims.: Cook's Video Diary – E4.com
7	"Katie's Video Diary"	"JJ"
Katie sends a message to her footballer boyfriend, Danny Guillermo: she's dumping him, but keeping his gifts.: Katie's Video Diary – E4.com
8	"Emily's Video Diary"	"Effy"
Emily has a project: getting her neighbours to get it on.: Emily's Video Diary – E4.com
9	"Effy's Video Diary"	"Katie and Emily"
Effy sends out messages during a stop in her road trip with Cook via webcam to her brother and mum.: Effy's Video Diary – E4.com
10	"Thomas's Video Diary"	"Finale"
Thomas sends his friend Moses (in the Congo) a message about the British people and their wonderful, weird ways. And a song?: Thomas's Video Diary – E4.com

=== The Lost Weeks ===
To explain what had happened to each character between series 1 and 2, a series of videos called "The Lost Weeks" were aired exclusively on E4.com. The episodes are as follows:

#	Title
1	"Effy's Video Diary"
Tony's sister recorded this in his room when he was in a coma.: Effy's Video Diary – E4.com
2	"Skins Christmas Special"
Seasonal greetings from the Skins gang.: Skins Christmas Special – E4.com
3	"Michelle's Video Diary"
"Black is such a slimming colour.": Michelle's Video Diary – E4.com
4	"Sid's Message to Tony"
A very special message from Sid to Tony.: Sid's Message to Tony – E4.com
5	"Cassie Hearts Sid"
Cassie posts Sid a message from Scotland.: Cassie Hearts Sid – E4.com
6	"Posh Kenneth Has a Secret"
"Kenneth has an ode for Jal.": Posh Kenneth Has a Secret – E4.com
7	"Sid's Bedside Vigil"
Sid visits his best mate Tony.: Sid's Bedside Vigil – E4.com
8	"Anwar's Video Diary"
Anwar's in love. His video diary boldly goes into detail.: Anwar's Video Diary – E4.com
9	"Chris' Message to Angie"
Chris wants to show how much he misses Angie, and cares for the Data Protection Act.: Chris' Message to Angie – E4.com
10	"Messages to Tony"
Sid had a plan to reach Tony.: Messages to Tony – E4.com

Although several of these videos bear the same name as a character video diary they are two separate videos.

== Ratings ==
Skins : UK viewers per episode (millions)

Season	Episode number									
Season	1	2	3	4	5	6	7	8	9	10
1	1.54	0.977	0.91	0.709	0.889	0.808	0.799	0.756	0.797	–
2	1.06	0.757	0.767	0.742	0.709	0.751	0.686	0.686	0.766	0.766
3	0.877	0.916	0.857	0.915	0.913	0.957	0.997	0.864	0.957	0.972
4	1.24	1.02	0.954	0.996	0.941	0.885	0.863	0.902	–	
5	1.03	0.72	0.741	0.661	0.574	0.588	0.486	0.494	–	
6	1.032	0.655	0.720	0.741	0.661	0.574	0.588	0.486	0.494	0.574
7	0.872	0.706	0.499	0.53	0.547	0.59	–			

Audience measurement performed by Broadcasters' Audience Research Board
