= Skins series 3 =

3rd series of the British television show Skins

Skins
- Season 3
- DVD cover art for the third series of Skins
- Starring: Lisa Backwell; Ollie Barbieri; Lily Loveless; Merveille Lukeba; Jack O'Connell; Luke Pasqualino; Kathryn Prescott; Megan Prescott; Kaya Scodelario
- No. of episodes: 10

Release
- Original network: E4
- Original release: 22 January – 26 March 2009

Season chronology
- ← Previous; Series 2 Next → Series 4

Skins is a British teen drama created by father-and-son television writers Bryan Elsley and Jamie Brittain for Company Pictures. The third series began airing on E4 on 22 January 2009 and ended on 26 March 2009. This series sees the introduction of a new cast; it follows the lives of the second generation of sixth form students Effy Stonem, Pandora Moon, Thomas Tomone, James Cook, Freddie McClair, JJ Jones, Naomi Campbell, and twin sisters Emily and Katie Fitch.

== Main cast ==
Actor	Role	Episodes
Luke Pasqualino	Freddie McClair	All
Ollie Barbieri	JJ Jones	All
Kaya Scodelario	Effy Stonem	9
Lisa Backwell	Pandora Moon	9
Jack O'Connell	James Cook	9
Lily Loveless	Naomi Campbell	9
Kathryn Prescott	Emily Fitch	9
Megan Prescott	Katie Fitch	9
Merveille Lukeba	Thomas Tomone	6

== List of episodes ==
No. overall	No. in series	Title	Featured character(s)	Directed by	Written by	Original release date	UK viewers (millions)
20	1	"Everyone"	Everyone	Charles Martin	Bryan Elsley	22 January 2009	0.877
The episode starts with Freddie skateboarding through Bristol and meeting up with his best mates Cook and JJ before college. Their world collides with Effy’s, and Cook is intrigued; however, both Freddie and JJ are equally smitten. Identical twin sisters, Katie and Emily, prepare for their first day; as per usual, Katie walks all over Emily. Once at college, Effy and Katie clock one another immediately, whilst Effy’s best friend Pandora tells Effy she wants to lose her virginity "asap". The college issue a number of rules to try to stop bad behaviour. Cook tries to charm Naomi who is sitting next to him but instead winds her up. Naomi doesn’t suffer fools gladly and grasses Cook up, resulting in Cook showing his inappropriate tattoo to the whole of sixth form. Effy issues smitten Freddie, JJ and Cook with a challenge of breaking several college rules - to be completed by the end of the day. The winner will ‘get to know her’ better. Katie meets Effy and warns her of Naomi, who she believes is a lesbian. Cook breaks all the rules and his reward is sex with Effy in the nurse’s office. Note: This episode marks the first appearances of Cook, Freddie, JJ, Katie, Emily & Naomi.
21	2	"Cook"	James Cook	Simon Massey	Jamie Brittain	29 January 2009	0.916
Cook invites the gang to his uncle Keith's pub to celebrate his seventeenth birthday which he believes will be a drink-fuelled event. The reality is that the gang are still trying to strengthen friendships. The girls decide to leave after Pandora throws up. Cook persuades them otherwise, promising drugs. Freddie gets a call from his sister Karen, who is at her friend Kayleigh’s engagement party. Cook rounds the gang up and they head over there uninvited. Cook flirts with Kayleigh. He gets hold of drugs, and some of the gang take them. Cook ups the tempo with his antics, angering Johnny White, who is Kayleigh’s father and a Bristol gangster. Cook gets beaten up and the party turns into a riot, so the gang decide to leave. Cook then drags JJ to a strip club-brothel after an argument with Freddie. Cook receives a handjob from a prostitute there, whilst JJ gets a kiss from another. There they find Johnny White. Cook takes a photo of him, taunts him and punches him whilst he is tied to a saltire, then nearly hits JJ. JJ leaves, and Johnny vows to kill Cook the next time he sees him. Cook then goes to see Freddie to discuss what happened.
22	3	"Thomas"	Thomas Tomone	Simon Massey	Daniel Kaluuya & Bryan Elsley	5 February 2009	0.857
Thomas arrives alone in the UK from the Republic of the Congo. His family are due to join him in a few days. He finds an abandoned flat on an estate, but little does he know that Johnny White has taken over the empty flats in the block and demands rent from Thomas. Thomas then meets Pandora and Effy at a bus stop. They head back to Effy's, where she discovers her mother having sex with another man. Pandora invites Thomas to her Aunt Elizabeth's for tea and scones. He soon discovers the tea is made from marijuana and offers to sell it to get the money to pay Johnny. The gang agree to help Thomas by selling at a party which turns out to be Johnny's turf. After escaping, the gang give the money they have made to Thomas but Johnny and his cronies turn up. Johnny reminds Cook of the threat he made (he would kill Cook when he saw him again) and snatches the chain from around Cook's neck that Cook took from him in the previous episode. Before Johnny can beat Cook, Thomas steps in and challenges him instead. Thomas wins the challenge by eating chilis. The gang decide to celebrate, but Thomas's mum turns up, and appalled by the ensuing party, sends him back home. The episode ends with Pandora being consoled by Aunt Elizabeth. Note: This episode marks the first appearance of Thomas.
23	4	"Pandora"	Pandora Moon	Simon Massey	Georgia Lester & Bryan Elsley	12 February 2009	0.915
Pandora wakes up in Effy's bed to discover Anthea watching over them. While they are eating breakfast, Jim's boss turns up and Jim finally finds out his wife is having an affair with his line manager. Effy runs away and is followed by Pandora, who tells her that she is having a birthday party; they then bump into Katie and her boyfriend. Effy and Katie go to Pandora's house where Pandora's mother Angela stipulates there are no boys or alcohol allowed. Katie then mixes MDMA into the brownies which they are making. Naomi and Emily arrive and they have a heart to heart. Everyone pretends they're having fun, except Effy. Effy and Angela eat some brownies, which ends with Angela being carried into her bedroom to sleep it off. Cook and JJ turn up; Cook breaks in and ends up getting locked in a wardrobe. Pandora and Effy have an argument, leaving Katie in the middle. Emily and Naomi kiss, which is seen by JJ and later by Katie. Katie's boyfriend and the rest of the Bristol Rovers turn up. Effy goes to Angela's room to apologise but instead has sex with Cook. Freddie turns up to rescue a 'locked on' JJ and makes Effy feel bad for leaving Pandora. Pandora has sex with Cook after everyone has left. The next morning Effy oversees Cook leaving Pandora's house and realises that they have had sex together so Pandora tells Effy some home truths. Thomas then turns up and hugs Pandora.
24	5	"Freddie"	Freddie McClair	Charles Martin	Ben Schiffer	19 February 2009	0.913
Freddie's sister Karen is in the Search for the Next Sexxbomb competition and Freddie thinks it is wrong that she is using the fact that their mother is dead to try to win. He then finds Effy in his garden wanting to see his shed. Cook and JJ then turn up; JJ impresses the gang with an elaborate fire-breathing trick, but Cook then asks Effy for sex, which she refuses. In college, Naomi realises that Freddie loves Effy. JJ tells Freddie that Cook wants him at his uncle Keith's pub quiz but Freddie tells JJ that he has had enough of Cook and heads to Effy's. He witnesses her parents breaking up and then Effy rejects him. Freddie comes home to find out his shed is being turned into a dance studio for Karen. During the pub quiz, Freddie finds out that Cook had sex with Karen. Freddie confronts Karen but ends up getting punched by his father. After a talk with his father which prompts him to start supporting Karen and abandoning his skateboard, he decides to tell Effy how he feels. Karen loses the competition because Cook, angered that she has taken Freddie's shed to use as practice, had encouraged everyone in his uncle's pub to vote against her. Karen and Freddie are angry with Cook when he tells them that he swung the vote against her. Freddie goes to Effy's house to see her, but sees her with Cook. Note: Thomas is absent from this episode.
25	6	"Naomi"	Naomi Campbell	Simon Massey	Atiha Sen Gupta & Jack Thorne	26 February 2009	0.957
Naomi wakes up with a random person's foot in her mouth, due to having a communal living arrangement and confronts her mother over this. At college, Emily is waiting for Naomi but Naomi avoids her in favour of her politics teacher Kieran, whom she has developed a friendship with. The Head of Roundview informs everyone they are holding an election for student president. Cook then challenges Naomi, stating if he wins the election she has to sleep with him. Naomi gets home to find Emily waiting for her. The next morning Naomi wakes up in bed with Emily and leaves without telling her, upsetting Emily. At college Freddie tells Naomi that he and Cook are no longer friends and admits he loves Effy. Cook's presidential campaign gains the support of the vast majority of the class, and he humiliates her. She is also further upset when Kieran kisses her. Naomi and Emily go on a bike ride and end up having sex but the next morning Naomi leaves her again and finds Kieran in bed with her mum. Cook wins the election after Naomi foils the teachers' plot to fix the votes. As part of the bet the two begin to have sex, but Naomi is hesitant, and to her surprise, Cook is fine with this and the two have a change of heart. Naomi's mum kicks everyone out of the house and talks to her about love. Naomi then goes to see Emily and they end up holding hands through a cat flap.
26	7	"JJ"	Jonah Jeremiah "JJ" Jones	Charles Martin	Bryan Elsley	5 March 2009	0.997
JJ keeps getting into rages. He explains this to his doctor, who prescribes him more pills and not very good advice. He meets Emily, who is also at the doctors and admits she’s having counselling as well. She advises him to just ask for the things he wants and offers to help him. So they go to visit Freddie only to discover him and Katie having sex. JJ then tells Cook how he feels over the phone but overhears him having sex. Thinking it is Effy, JJ goes to see her, and finds out Effy hasn’t seen Cook for days. JJ then sees Pandora leave Cook's dorm room. After running away from the police at a drug raid, JJ offers Cook some pills. At one of Thomas’s club nights, Effy realises that Naomi loves Emily, and Effy assures Naomi that Effy wouldn't think of her any differently if she was gay. Right after, Naomi realises that Effy loves Freddie. Freddie rescues Cook from getting beaten up and Cook reveals who Effy really loves. Emily then offers to sleep with JJ as a once in a lifetime offer. At breakfast JJ’s mum watches him and Emily talk about the night before and she realises he’s going to be ok after all.
27	8	"Effy"	Effy Stonem	Charles Martin	Lucy Kirkwood	12 March 2009	0.864
Effy's dead inside. She doesn't feel anything anymore, not even when she and Cook are having sex. She's also lost her queen bee status to Katie. Effy tries to get her mother's attention but she does not listen. Effy goes to see Freddie only to find Katie with him in his shed. Katie tells her about a party at Gobbler's End and asks her to drive but Cook is not invited. Cook turns up at Effy's to find out she's not there and that he's been dumped. At a petrol station the gang run into some poachers, who scare them. The gang settle in at Gobbler's End and actually start enjoying themselves, except Pandora. Effy notices and tries to help and shows the gang some magic mushrooms she's picked. Cook then crashes the party and tells everyone that he slept with Pandora and that Effy loves Freddie and not him, so Katie runs off. Effy begins to have a bad trip and runs off into the woods and finds Katie, who messes with her head and as revenge orders her to stay away from Freddie. Katie then attacks her so Effy hits her over the head with a rock in defence. Effy walks off and sleeps with Freddie. The next morning the gang can't find Katie. Back at home Effy gets a phone call from Freddie telling her that Katie has been found. Effy goes to the hospital only to be shunned by everyone for what she did. She then wakes up in a stolen car which Cook is driving out of Bristol.
28	9	"Katie and Emily"	Katie and Emily Fitch	Charles Martin	Malcolm Campbell & Bryan Elsley	19 March 2009	0.957
Katie will not leave the house so Emily has to pretend to be her and sit Katie's exams. Naomi tells Emily that she's going to Cyprus over the summer alone to work things out. Emily asks Naomi to go to the love ball with her but Naomi says no. Thomas finds a broken hearted Emily at the bus stop and proves to be a true friend. Back at home Emily tells her family that she is gay but they pass it off as a joke, so Emily tells Katie some home truths. Naomi turns up at Katie and Emily's the next morning and their mum tells her to leave Emily alone. Katie and Emily go shopping for dresses for the love ball. They bump into Freddie and JJ. Katie finds out Emily slept with JJ and decides to tell Naomi and warns her not to come to the love ball. Naomi decides to go to the love ball after all. Katie and Naomi fight, which is overheard by Emily. Emily and Katie then start to fight. Just as Emily is about to punch Katie she stops herself and tells her and the whole ball that she loves Naomi. She then takes Naomi's hand and they walk away. Thomas and Pandora also decide to start afresh. Note: Effy and Cook are absent from this episode.
29	10	"Finale"	Effy Stonem, James Cook, JJ Jones and Freddie McClair	Simon Massey	Ben Schiffer	26 March 2009	0.972
Effy and Cook are in self imposed exile from the rest of the gang. Effy is fed up of running but Cook reveals they have arrived where his dad lives. He and his dad decide to celebrate in the pub. Meanwhile in Bristol, Anthea bumps into JJ and they talk about Effy. Effy is dancing in a pub. A stranger starts dancing with her, and Cook starts fighting with him. Effy calls Freddie and confesses that she loves him. Freddie and JJ turn up and Cook challenges them in a race. Whoever wins gets to keep Effy. JJ ends up winning the race, so he gets them all in a room to sort out who Effy actually loves. Her eyes linger towards Freddie so Cook storms out. Effy and Freddie then end up having sex. Cook asks his father if he can leave town with him on his boat but his dad ends up threatening him. Freddie hits Cook's dad over the head before he can hurt Cook. Freddie asks Cook for his permission to be with Effy but Cook won't and explains he still loves her. Effy, Cook, Freddie and JJ decide to drive the boat back to Bristol. Cook's dad wakes up and Cook pushes him off the boat. The series finishes with Freddie asking "What do we do now?" Note: Pandora, Thomas, Katie, Emily and Naomi are absent from this episode.
