= Skins series 4 =

4th series of the British television show Skins

Skins
- Season 4
- DVD cover art for the fourth series of Skins
- Starring: Lisa Backwell; Ollie Barbieri; Lily Loveless; Merveille Lukeba; Jack O'Connell; Luke Pasqualino; Kathryn Prescott; Megan Prescott; Kaya Scodelario
- No. of episodes: 8

Release
- Original network: E4
- Original release: 28 January – 18 March 2010

Season chronology
- ← Previous; Series 3 Next → Series 5

Skins is a British teen drama created by father-and-son television writers Bryan Elsley and Jamie Brittain for Company Pictures. The fourth series began airing on E4 on 28 January 2010 and ended on 18 March 2010. Like the previous series, this series follows the lives of the second generation, which consists of Effy Stonem, Pandora Moon, Thomas Tomone, James Cook, Freddie McClair, JJ Jones, Naomi Campbell, and twin sisters Emily and Katie Fitch.

== Main cast ==
Actor	Role	Episodes
Ollie Barbieri	JJ Jones	All
Kaya Scodelario	Effy Stonem	7
Luke Pasqualino	Freddie McClair	7
Merveille Lukeba	Thomas Tomone	7
Jack O'Connell	James Cook	7
Lily Loveless	Naomi Campbell	7
Kathryn Prescott	Emily Fitch	7
Megan Prescott	Katie Fitch	6
Lisa Backwell	Pandora Moon	6

== List of episodes ==
No. overall	No. in series	Title	Featured character(s)	Directed by	Written by	Original release date	UK viewers (millions)
30	1	"Thomas"	Thomas Tomone	Neil Biswas	Jamie Brittain	28 January 2010	1.24
The episode starts with the gang, minus Effy, having a great time at Thomas's club night until a girl named Sophia commits suicide, by jumping from a balcony in the club whilst high on drugs, leaving Thomas feeling guilty. He suspects that Cook sold Sophia the drugs. During questioning at college, Thomas follows Cook into the toilets where they come to blows, after Cook antagonises Thomas about Pandora. Thomas proceeds to cheat on Pandora with a woman at the local African church, and confesses this to Pandora. He is also expelled from college because of his perceived involvement with Sophia's death. Thomas gets drunk, spotting Cook and Naomi. Cook starts to wind him up again, leading Thomas to start fighting with him. Naomi confesses to selling the girl drugs. Thomas then goes round to Pandora's house in an attempt to win her back but is rejected under advice from Effy, who is inside the house.
31	2	"Emily"	Emily Fitch	Philippa Langdale	Ed Hime	4 February 2010	1.02
Under police questioning, Naomi lies about not seeing Sophia at the club night and Emily becomes suspicious. Naomi admits she sold Sophia the drugs. Emily discovers that Sophia was gay and had known Naomi. Emily and Naomi investigate and realise that Sophia had been stalking Naomi for some time, with a shrine-like display of Naomi in her locker. Emily argues with her family about her sexuality, decides to move out due to increasing tensions with her mother Jenna and Katie, and moves in with Naomi. Emily remains suspicious about Sophia's story and discovers, through a flip book created by Sophia, that Naomi had a one-day affair with her and had tried to hide it. At a house party, Cook beats up a random party-goer after seeing Freddie and Effy kissing.
32	3	"Cook"	James Cook	Philippa Langdale	Ben Schiffer	11 February 2010	0.954
Cook is in prison, charged with grievous bodily harm for beating up Shanky Jenkinson. He pleads not guilty and is sent to live with his mother Ruth. He bonds with his younger brother Paddy, but clashes with his mother. Cook is expelled from college for his brush with the law. He visits Naomi, who tells him they must deal with their guilt over Sophia. Cook learns that his mother slept with Freddie, but Freddie tells him she only performed oral sex. Cook argues with Ruth, leaves the house with Paddy and steals Ruth’s car, trashing it. He has a moment of insight when he sees Paddy acting like him. Cook pleads guilty at trial and states that he sold the drugs to Sophia, and is imprisoned. Note: Thomas and Katie are absent from this episode.
33	4	"Katie"	Katie Fitch	Neil Biswas	Georgia Lester	18 February 2010	0.996
Katie has a job as a wedding planner. Their client is Brandy, a stereotypical WAG. Katie visits the doctor, thinking she is pregnant, only to discover she is experiencing a premature menopause and is infertile. Her family is bankrupt after her father Rob’s ill-spending. Katie goes to Brandy’s hen party, but gets into a fight, is barred, and gets her and her mother sacked. The Fitches' house is repossessed and they are forced to move in with Naomi and Emily, whose relationship is strained, even though Emily, remembering Jenna's rudeness to her, would like nothing to do with them. At a BBQ party, Emily gets drunk and high and makes out with another girl, leading Naomi to admit to the group she slept with Sophia and sold her drugs. Katie has a bath and Thomas accidentally locks them inside. They start to kiss, about to have sex, but Katie breaks down, telling Thomas about her condition. They agree to be friends. Katie consoles Emily and the Fitches move back into their now empty house, the family beginning to reunite. Note: Cook and Pandora are absent from this episode.
34	5	"Freddie"	Freddie McClair	Esther May Campbell	Sean Buckley	25 February 2010	0.941
Freddie and Effy live a hedonistic lifestyle in the Stonem house with Anthea gone. Freddie's education suffers and when he tells Effy this, they argue and he leaves. Freddie returns to see Effy sticking newspaper cuttings about death onto the wall. He becomes worried about her psychotic behaviour. He talks to his grandfather, Norman, and becomes determined not to make the mistakes with Effy that he perceived his father made with his deceased mother. Freddie takes Effy outside in an effort to cheer her up, but she becomes frightened. On their way home, Freddie mistakenly rides their rented rickshaw into a street festival where Effy panics. Katie finds her and they take her to Norman's nursing home. He convinces Freddie that Effy needs clinical help. However, Katie then reveals that Effy has locked herself in the bathroom. Realising she is at risk of attempting suicide, Freddie breaks in to discover that Effy has slashed her wrists. When Freddie goes to see Effy in hospital, she tells him to go away. He burns the cuttings in the Stonem house, Cook suddenly appears, worried about Freddie. He puts aside his own feelings for Effy and convinces Freddie not to give up on her. Note: Emily and Naomi are absent from this episode.
35	6	"JJ"	Jonah Jeremiah "JJ" Jones	Esther May Campbell	Lucy Kirkwood	4 March 2010	0.885
JJ is in love with Lara Lloyd, a fellow employee at a confectionery shop, but lacks the courage to ask her out. Thomas gets JJ to ask her out and she accepts. Freddie sneaks Cook over to JJ's house and forces Cook to stay in JJ's room. Cook gives JJ some poor dating tips. JJ visits Lara's flat and discovers that she is a single mother with a young child. Her ex-boyfriend, Liam, walks in and threatens JJ, telling him to leave Lara and his child alone. The date goes disastrously due to several mishaps, but JJ later finds her and they have sex at Lara's. JJ returns home but his mother takes him to the clinic for more medication, and Cook is angry at JJ for leaving him for so long without food, water or access to the bathroom. JJ allows Lara to meet Naomi and Emily. Upstairs, Emily tells JJ that Lara is using him to get back at her ex. JJ snaps at Emily and makes remarks on her own relationship, reducing her to tears. JJ's mother also thinks Lara is a slut and after they discover the bathroom is locked due to Cook hiding there, Lara leaves. JJ becomes angry and beats up Liam when he sees him talking to Lara, who then calls off their relationship. JJ apologises to Liam, who tells JJ he loves his child and for JJ to look after Lara. JJ serenades Lara with a ukulele version of 'True' by Spandau Ballet, and she takes him back. Note: Effy, Katie and Pandora are absent from this episode.
36	7	"Effy"	Effy Stonem	Daniel O' Hara	Jamie Brittain	11 March 2010	0.863
Effy returns home after being in a psychiatric hospital. Anthea and Freddie become worried about her counsellor's methods when Effy begins to reject her identity, her friends and her bad memories. She is given fake exam results, and at a celebration party where most of the group are celebrating their A levels, Effy suddenly states that she is finished and is saying goodbye to everyone. She relapses when she and Cook walk past the scene of Tony's accident and returns to hospital. Effy is upset when Foster arrives and Freddie threatens him, telling him to stay away. Foster promises to back off. Freddie is invited to Foster's house to talk about his and Effy's relationship. Foster attacks Freddy with a baseball bat, saying that Effy really does love Freddie, and for that reason he cannot let him go. Note: This episode marks the final physical appearance of Freddie.
37	8	"Everyone"	Everyone	Daniel O' Hara	Bryan Elsley	18 March 2010	0.902
Karen is worried about Freddie's whereabouts. Cook begins sleeping with an Effy lookalike named Arcia while staying at Naomi and Emily's. Thomas and Katie conspire to make Pandora jealous, but Katie soon develops feelings for him. Karen gives Cook Freddie's notebook, which hints that John Foster wants to hurt Effy. The police raid Naomi's house after Arcia tells them where he is. Cook escapes and flees to Freddie's shed, where he meets Effy. The rest of the gang meet there and throw a birthday party for Freddie in his absence. Naomi admits her love for Emily, who in turn takes her back, and Thomas and Pandora reunite after finding out they are both going to Harvard next year. Cook heads outside briefly where he spots a figure observing Freddie's house and follows it, assuming it to be John Foster. Cook breaks into John's basement, where he finds Freddie's blood-stained clothes. Foster soon arrives with the baseball bat and Cook tells John that he knows he killed Freddie. He suddenly attacks and swings at Foster screaming "I'm Cook!" as the episode ends, leaving the outcome unknown. Note: This episode marks the final appearances of Pandora, Thomas, JJ and Katie. Freddie's voice can be heard although it's uncredited.
