= Everyone (Skins series 4) =

- Skins episode
- Episode no.: Season 4 Episode 8
- Directed by: Daniel O'Hara
- Written by: Jamie Brittain
- Original air date: 18 March 2010

Guest appearances
- Holly Churches as Arcia; Karina Minhas as Mandy; Seth & Nixon Evans as Baby Albert; Hugo Speer as John Foster; Klariza Clayton as Karen; Kwame-Kwei Armah as Thomas' personal trainer

Episode chronology
← Previous "Effy"	Next → "Franky"
- Skins (series 4)

"Everyone" is the eighth and final episode of fourth series of the British teen drama Skins, and the 37th overall. It was first aired on 18 March 2010. It was written by Bryan Elsley and directed by Daniel O'Hara. It does not focus on any particular character. The main plot sees the gang investigate Freddie McClair's disappearance, upon being murdered by his girlfriend Effy Stonem's psychiatrist Dr. John Foster.

== Plot ==
The episode opens with short clips of several characters; Thomas Tomone is shown running, having taken up athletics, James Cook is shown having sex with Arcia, who is assumed to be his new girlfriend, Emily Fitch is seen with a girl named Mandy and Katie Fitch is seen visiting Effy at the hospital, to which Pandora Moon joins them and cheers Effy up with a song she wrote.

Freddie's sister Karen and Cook are worried about Freddie's whereabouts. Effy is sent home by Dr. Foster, while Mandy starts hitting on Emily, revealing that Emily's girlfriend Naomi Campbell thinks she is straight. Thomas and Katie then devise a plan for the former to win Pandora back - involving Thomas tutoring Katie one-on-one in a French lesson. The majority of the gang are at Naomi's for drinks; however, things go sour when she accidentally calls Arcia 'Effy', unintentionally making Cook realise his new girlfriend looks like Effy, who had hurt him several times in prior episodes. Cook then dumps Arcia and then is asked to talk with Karen. After a brief argument, Karen gives Cook Freddie's notebook, which hints that John Foster wants to hurt Effy, causing Cook to break down.

JJ Jones is then seen leaving the party, where Naomi is acting unconventionally hyper, even flirting with Mandy in front of Emily's face, causing her to storm off. During the French tuition, Thomas makes Katie constantly repeat dirty phrases. Pandora sits outside, upset because it is revealed she got an A* in French, so she knows exactly what they are saying. The police raid Naomi's house after Arcia tells them where Cook is, who escapes and flees to Freddie's shed, where he meets Effy, who is worried that she scared Freddie off. Meanwhile, Thomas is pushed into getting an athletics scholarship to Harvard University in the United States. The rest of the gang meet in the shed and throw a birthday party for Freddie in his absence. Naomi admits her love for Emily, stating she was scared of the effect she had on her and Emily in turn takes her back. Thomas and Pandora also make up after it is revealed they are going to the same university.

The closing scene for most characters ends with them having a great time at the party, except for Cook as he has headed outside, where he spots a figure observing Freddie's house and follows it, assuming it to be John Foster. Cook breaks into John's basement where he finds Freddie's blood-stained clothes. Foster soon arrives with the baseball bat and knocks him to the ground, telling him that he is "nothing". Cook rises, laughing and admits he is a criminal, and has no sense. He then tells John that he knows he killed Freddie. He suddenly attacks and swings at Foster screaming "I'm Cook!" as the episode ends, leaving the outcome unknown.

== Cast ==
- Kaya Scodelario as Effy Stonem
- Lisa Backwell as Pandora Moon
- Merveille Lukeba as Thomas Tomone
- Jack O'Connell as James Cook
- Ollie Barbieri as JJ Jones
- Lily Loveless as Naomi Campbell
- Kathryn Prescott as Emily Fitch
- Megan Prescott as Katie Fitch
- Luke Pasqualino as Freddie McClair (does not physically appear but his voice is heard)
