= Naomi Campbell (Skins) =

Fictional character from Skins

- Skins character
- First appearance: "Everyone" (episode 3.01)
- Last appearance: Fire (episode 7.02)
- Created by: Bryan Elsley and Jamie Brittain
- Portrayed by: Lily Loveless
- Seasons: 3–4, 7
- Centric episode(s): "Naomi" (episode 3.06)

In-universe information
- Occupation: Student; Stand-up comedian
- Significant other: Emily Fitch (girlfriend)
- Relatives: Gina Campbell (mother)

Naomi Campbell is a fictional character in the British television teen drama Skins, played by Lily Loveless. Naomi was a main character in the third and fourth series of the programme, as part of the show's second set of characters. Her story lines focused mainly on her romantic relationship with Emily Fitch and identifying her sexuality, and were warmly received by critics. Loveless reprises the role for the seventh series, in the feature-length Skins Fire, which catches up with Effy as she struggles to cope with adult life and Naomi struggles with a diagnosis of cancer.

== Characterization ==
Naomi is an individualist; passionate, political and principled. Throughout the third and fourth series, Naomi's sexual orientation is left ambiguous; after firmly maintaining she is straight, she later confesses to Effy and Emily, on separate occasions, that she is unsure, and she has shown an interest in Cook, to the extent that she nearly had sex with him in her centric episode, however she aborted the encounter due to her feelings for Emily. In the last episode of series 4, Naomi reveals that she fell in love with Emily when they were younger, but was afraid of Emily's effect on her, so she slept with boys to try to get rid of her feelings for Emily.

Much of the third series is about Naomi dealing with her feelings for Emily and questioning her sexuality. Up until "Pandora", Naomi maintains that she is straight and does not have feelings for Emily, who she knows is in love with her. However, in her centric episode, they share their first sexual experience. By the end of the series they both come out publicly as a couple.

Much of the fourth series deals with Emily and Naomi having problems with their relationship, mostly due to Naomi cheating on Emily while also having contrasting plans on whether they should go to University right after graduating or not. By "Everyone", their relationship is on the rocks, but Naomi finally reveals her true feelings: that she had always loved Emily and that she is done running, and presents to her two tickets to travel after graduation, and thus she and Emily reunite.

In season 7, Naomi's character has changed significantly. Her blonde hair is now brunette in colour, and she has also lost her idealistic, political personality. Instead, she has become an unambitious, unmotivated slacker who spends her days smoking cannabis and drinking with her friends. Worrying that her life has lost direction, Naomi aspires to be, and eventually becomes, a successful stand-up comedian. However, her brush with success is marred when she is diagnosed with cancer, which leads to her becoming quiet and frail, and ultimately kills her, making her the fourth major Skins character to die in the show's seven seasons.

== Character history ==
=== Series 3 ===
In "Everyone", Naomi is first seen sitting in the school auditorium during an assembly and is the last main character to appear (besides Thomas who debuted in the third episode). She is met with ridicule due to sharing a name with a fashion model. Cook sees her and tries to charm her but instead winds her up, by telling her that he'll show his tattoo. Raising her hand, she tells on Cook, saying that he wanted to show her something "inappropriate", causing the teachers to force Cook to show them his tattoo, which turns out to be on his penis. Katie also points her out to Effy, stating that "Naomi was the lesbian that tried to get off with my sister".

In "Cook", she is invited to Cook's birthday party, much to Katie's chagrin. She begins to complain, asking why they "invited the lesbian", but Emily produces a cake seemingly out of thin-air, turning the attention away from Naomi. In "Thomas", Emily admits that she came on to Naomi, not the other way around. She and Naomi almost kiss again, but Naomi leaves, telling Emily that she is straight, something Emily needs to accept.

In "Pandora", as Naomi and Emily arrive together, Naomi urges Emily to admit that she is gay, but Emily denies it. After calling Freddie for help, JJ goes into the house by himself and sees Emily and Naomi kissing. Katie, too, witnesses the pair kissing, but is interrupted when her footballer boyfriend, Danny Guillermo, and dozens of his friends arrive at the house to crash the party.

In her centric episode, Naomi lives with her hippy mother Gina and fifteen other people in a communal living arrangement. At college, she avoids Emily to meet with her politics teacher, Kieran, instead. In the students' common room, they are informed of the upcoming elections for Student President. Emily encourages Naomi to run for president, but Naomi refuses. She later comes across Cook, who tries to persuade her to have sex with him. She jokingly tells him that he has a better chance of winning the student elections. He sees this as a challenge and decides to register. Kieran walks her home at the end of the day and urges her to run in the elections, giving her a registration form. When she arrives at her house, she finds Emily waiting in her bedroom with another registration form. Emily starts to leave when Naomi is rude and standoffish to her—despite taking Emily's advice to enter the elections—but confronts Naomi instead. She tells Naomi that, despite having kissed her twice previously, she is more interested in friendship than a sexual relationship with her, and Naomi invites her to stay for the night.

When Naomi wakes up the following morning, she leaves Emily in her bed as she goes to college. At college, she sees the massive presidential campaign staged by Cook and JJ. She launches her own campaign to rival Cook, but finds that most of her classmates' support is for Cook's anarchist ideas. She is doubly humiliated in front of the form when Cook ridicules her and Emily subsequently stands up for her. She flees to Kieran for comfort but leaves him, shocked and disgusted, when he kisses her. She goes home and, after finding a note from Emily in her bed, cries herself to sleep.

Naomi and Emily escape to the countryside the next day and cycle to one of Emily's favourite places by a lake. After swimming in the lake, they light a campfire. Naomi kisses Emily, and they proceed to have sex. Emily wakes up the following morning to find Naomi preparing to leave. She pleas for Naomi not to leave her a second time, and tells her that she should accept that she needs to be loved. Naomi returns home to find Kieran in bed with her mother, and leaves for college, devastated. She witnesses her teachers' rigging the votes to prevent Cook from winning, and reveals this to the form after she is announced the winner of the elections. As his first presidential act, Cook starts a riot. In the ensuing chaos, Naomi sees Emily but, instead of talking to her, leaves. Naomi forgives Kieran and begins to have sex with Cook before she realises that it isn't right. Cook makes no attempt to force her, and she leaves, with her and Cook now sharing a better understanding of each other. That night, she visits Emily's house, but Emily refuses to open the door, not wanting Naomi to see her after she had been crying. They sit on opposite sides of the door, and Naomi admits that she does need somebody to love her. Emily offers her hand through the door's catflap to Naomi, who finally reciprocates Emily's feelings.

In "Katie and Emily", At college, Naomi uncovers Emily's disguise (she took Katie's tests for her) and tells her that she plans to spend the summer alone in Cyprus. When Emily tells Naomi that she will miss her, they kiss in an empty corridor and later find themselves at Naomi's house where they have sex. Afterward, Emily asks Naomi to the college ball, but Naomi, still crippled by insecurity over her sexuality, refuses, leaving Emily heartbroken. Later, Emily returns home and comes out to her family, telling them that she has been having sex with a girl named Naomi. The following morning, Naomi visits the Fitches' house, but Emily's mother Jenna answers the door. She confronts Naomi, convincing her that Emily is not gay and warning Naomi to stay away from her. Naomi too denies her own sexual orientation and leaves hastily.

Katie intercepts one of Naomi's phone calls to Emily and tricks Naomi into meeting with her, where she reveals Emily's affair with JJ and warns Naomi not to come to the ball. As Katie, Emily, Freddie and JJ prepare to enter the ball, Naomi arrives, announcing that she knows about Emily and JJ's fling before she walks in. An upset Emily leaves, while Katie starts a fight with Naomi, where she reveals her deceit against her sister.

After the fight ends, In front of everybody, Emily tells Katie that she is her own person and that she is in love with Naomi. Katie accepts Emily's individuality and sexuality, and Naomi, no longer ashamed of their relationship, extends her hand to Emily. The couple leaves the ball hand-in-hand and Naomi tells Emily that she loves her too.

=== Series 4 ===
In Thomas, she is present when the girl Sophia kills herself after taking MDMA. Although Thomas originally thinks Cook sold the drugs to Sophia, Naomi reveals that she did it, and begs him not to tell Emily. In "Emily", the episode begins with Emily in Naomi's house, looking at her girlfriend's pictures. They are planning a trip to Mexico after college finishes. A package arrives containing a pair of goggles that Naomi has bought for Emily, telling her not to ever forget that she loves her. The couple uses Emily's moped and visits the Fitch house, where Rob Fitch is cleaning out the garage. Emily talks to her mother, Jenna Fitch who insist they have a conversation about Emily's future. Emily brushes her off, and rides off to Roundview college with Naomi.

The police turn up with more questions about Sophia's death, they are both called in to be interviewed. Their names were listed by the family as close friends of Sophia's, even though they'd never met her. Emily learns that Naomi was dealing powder with Cook the night of the suicide and sold some to Sophia to pay for the motorbike goggles she bought her.

Behind Naomi's back, Emily visits Sophia's family to find out more about the dead girl. She discovers that Sophia claimed to be best friends with Naomi and Emily. While looking around Sophia's bedroom Emily discovers that Sophia was gay and she finds and takes a university prospectus with a key inside. She leaves and later, when flicking through the prospectus, she finds a photo of Sophia laughing with Naomi. She realizes that Naomi did in fact know the dead girl and suspects that she might have cheated on her with Sophia.

Emily interrupts Naomi's class by slamming a picture of Sophia and Naomi taken at the University Open Day, making the latter walk out of class. The two argue about lying and Naomi admits that she indeed met Sophia at a University open day which she was attending behind Emily's back. She insists they just talked and that nothing had happened between them. Still a bit doubtful, Emily tells her about they key she found and Naomi believes it is for Sophia's locker at the army base. They go to the army base and open it and inside they find a shrine to Naomi. They discover that Sophia was infatuated with Naomi and Emily makes up with her, having sex with Naomi in an army storage closet. After a fight with her mother over her sexuality, Emily moves in with Naomi and they seem to have put everything behind them. However, when they go to a party later on, Emily becomes suspicious again when Naomi starts talking to other girls.

At dawn, Emily takes a wooden box she had taken from Sophia's army base locker and goes back to the club where Sophia died to meet Sophia's brother to open up the box. Emily believes the box contains evidence that proves Naomi's affair with Sophia. Soon after Sophia's brother arrives, Naomi turns up and asks Emily to forget all about Sophia and Emily tells her that she can't leave it. Sophia's brother runs to the roof and Emily follows him. Up on the roof they open the box and find Sophia's sketchbook. Through Sophia's drawings that depict her one-day affair with Naomi, Emily finds out that Naomi did in fact cheat on her. A distraught Emily leaves the roof with Naomi crying and calling after her.

Emily talks to her dad about Naomi cheating and her dad tells her that he once cheated on Emily's mum, and that she should not worry as it gets better after it is worse. Emily goes back to Naomi's house, reading a note on the front door saying, "I'll do anything". The episode ends with Emily walking through the front door, seemingly following her father's advice.

In "Cook", he visits Naomi who tells him they must deal with their guilt over Sophia. Later, he finds Naomi and they talk, bonding over how they both love someone. He tells the police he sold Sophia the MDMA, taking the flak for Naomi. Cook pleads guilty at trial and is imprisoned. In "Katie", the Fitch's house is repossessed and they are forced to move in with Naomi and Emily, whose relationship is strained. At a BBQ party, Emily gets drunk and high and makes out with another girl, leading Naomi to admit to the group she slept with Sophia and sold her drugs. In "JJ", JJ lets Lara meet Naomi and Emily. Upstairs, Emily tells JJ that Lara is using him to get back at her ex. JJ comments on Emily's relationship and about how she is destroying it by continuing to punish Naomi, who has apologized repeatedly, reducing her to tears.

In "Effy", Naomi visits Effy, asking her for advice on Emily. Effy says that Naomi should just imagine it never happened. Naomi received three A's from her A-levels.

In "Everyone", Naomi (like the rest of the gang) believes Freddie had run away, not being able to deal with Effy's issues. Emily and Naomi's relationship is still on the rocks. Cook brings to Naomi's party his new girlfriend Arcia, whom everyone calls "Effy 2.0". Later, she invites everyone for a drink and accidentally calls Arcia "Effy", causing her and Cook to get in argument, with her leaving in a huff. The police then raid Naomi's house after Arcia tells the police where he is hiding. Later, Naomi is confronted when the girl Emily brought over, Mandy, who Naomi thought was straight up until then, not only starts hitting on her, but also tells her that she wanted Emily as well.

After another fight, Emily and Naomi do not talk until they meet at Freddie's shed. Naomi finally reveals her true feelings: that she had always loved Emily but she was scared by the effect Emily had on her, so she tried everything to lessen it. However, she states that she is done running, and presents to her two tickets to travel to Goa, India after graduation, and thus she and Emily reunite. She is last seen having a great time at the party at Freddie's shed.

=== Series 7 ===
In the two-part episode "Fire" of Series 7, taking place three years after the events of Series 4, Naomi is now Effy's flatmate, while Emily is working on an internship in New York. Naomi is largely unemployed, continues to drink and do drugs excessively, and vainly pursues a career as a stand-up comedian, much to the annoyance of Effy. At her first stand-up gig, she is booed offstage, after which she has a fight with Effy over her allowing two potential investors to flirt with her. She has been suffering from pain in her abdomen, which she earlier says the doctor has said is "hormonal hypochondria", but she has continued to have medical appointments, including one the day of the gig. The next morning, Effy is awoken by the sound of Naomi blaring loud music through the flat, and goes up to the balcony to confront her. Through tears, Naomi angrily reveals she has cancer. As time passes, Naomi eventually becomes a successful stand-up comedian (while undergoing radiotherapy and chemotherapy); she refuses to tell Emily that she's ill, not wanting her to give up her internship. Despite this, Effy continues to be further annoyed when she finds out Naomi isn't making enough money out of her career. After her condition takes a turn for the worse and becomes terminal, Naomi is made comfortable in hospital. Emily is finally called back from New York, furious about the secrecy and lost time; as Emily embraces Naomi in her hospital bed, Naomi gives Effy a smile over Emily's shoulder, happy that she can die peacefully with Emily at her side.

== Reception ==
The "Naomily" storyline of Series 3 and 4 proved popular with lesbian viewers; a poll conducted by American gay women's media website AfterEllen.com ranked Naomi and Emily as the top two fictional lesbian and bisexual characters. She was also ranked No. 8 in AfterEllen.com's Top 50 Favorite Female TV Characters of 2013. A critic for PopSugar.com found Emily's plea to Naomi as Naomi left the campsite "heartbreaking".
