= Skins series 7 =

7th series of the British television show Skins

Skins
- Season 7
- DVD cover art for the seventh series of Skins
- Starring: Kaya Scodelario; Lily Loveless; Kayvan Novak; Kathryn Prescott; Lara Pulver; Craig Roberts; Hannah Murray; Neil Morrissey; Olly Alexander; Daniel Ben Zenou; Charlene McKenna; Jack O'Connell; Liam Boyle; Esther Smith; Lucien Laviscount; Hannah Britland
- No. of episodes: 6

Release
- Original network: E4
- Original release: 1 July – 5 August 2013

Season chronology
- ← Previous; Series 6

Skins is a British teen drama created by father-and-son television writers Bryan Elsley and Jamie Brittain for Company Pictures. The first series aired in 2007, with the seventh and final series, entitled Skins Redux, airing on E4 from 1 July 2013 to 5 August 2013. The final series saw the return of several characters from the first two generations of the show.

== Summary ==
Notably, all of the characters featured have undergone enormous personality changes since their last appearances: Effy has cast her party-hard lifestyle and issues aside, and has become more mature and ambitious. Naomi has lost much of her ambition as a principled young woman and is now a layabout and stoner. Emily has become more confident. Cassie has overcome her mental issues, but has become solitary, serious, principled and tired, and Cook has become much more subdued, serious and calculated, as a result of having spent years on the run. In addition, the series leaves behind its traditional setting in Bristol, moving to London where Effy, Cassie and Naomi now live, as well as Manchester where Cook now lives. Its subject matter moves on from teenage problems to more adult issues, such as insider trading, terminal illness, rough living and the criminal underworld.

== Background ==
On 8 March 2012, Channel 4 confirmed that Skins would come to an end after a seventh series of six episodes, which would feature characters from the first and second generations. The third generation would not be involved in the seventh series. Channel 4 promised "a celebration of this truly iconic series".

Jamie Brittain, who had quit the show after series 5, returned as part of the writing staff. Brittain also revealed via Twitter that filming would begin in late October.

Series seven marked a departure in style with former stars Hannah Murray, Jack O'Connell and Kaya Scodelario returning to the roles which had shaped their careers in three individual stories, each one broadcast in two one-hour parts.

The three stories had distinct titles: 'Skins Pure' (featuring Cassie), 'Skins Rise' (featuring Cook) and 'Skins Fire' (featuring Effy). Lily Loveless (Naomi) and Kat Prescott (Emily) also appeared in guest roles. Each two-part episode centres on the characters now in their early twenties.

== Episodes ==
No. overall	No. in series	Title	Featured character(s)	Directed by	Written by	Original release date	UK viewers (millions)
56	1	"Fire (Part 1)"	Effy Stonem	Charles Martin	Jess Brittain	1 July 2013	0.872
Effy, now aged 21, is working a dead-end job as a receptionist for a leading London hedge fund and lives in a flat in Canary Wharf with Naomi Campbell, who is an aspiring stand-up comedian, while Emily is currently in New York on a lucrative internship. Note: Also featuring Amy Wren.
57	2	"Fire (Part 2)"	Effy Stonem	Charles Martin	Jess Brittain	8 July 2013	0.706
A few months have passed since Part One. Effy is in a fully-fledged relationship with her wealthy boss Jake and, despite her illness, Naomi is becoming a successful and popular stand-up comedian, though she still can't afford rent. Note: Also featuring Kathryn Prescott, Lara Pulver, Craig Roberts and Amy Wren. Final appearances of Effy, Naomi, and Emily.
58	3	"Pure (Part 1)"	Cassie Ainsworth	Paul Gay	Bryan Elsley	15 July 2013	0.499
Cassie, now 23, attempts to make sense of her life by spending time alone in London, but she soon realises someone is following her. Suddenly a strange friendship blossoms out of mutual loneliness, but she is unsure the new relationship can survive in the real world. Note: Also featuring Olly Alexander and Neil Morrissey.
59	4	"Pure (Part 2)"	Cassie Ainsworth	Paul Gay	Bryan Elsley	22 July 2013	0.53
Cassie's strange new relationship is tested to its limits in the concluding part of Skins: Pure Note: Also featuring Olly Alexander and Neil Morrissey. Final appearance of Cassie.
60	5	"Rise (Part 1)"	James Cook	Jack Clough	Jamie Brittain	29 July 2013	0.547
Cook lives a life on the run, working as a drug peddler for a powerful crime boss in Manchester. When he is asked to help his employer's girlfriend find a house and finds that she is irresistibly attracted to him, he sets off a chain of events which will lead him into a world of savage revenge and a confrontation with his own dark past. Note: Also featuring Liam Boyle, Lucien Laviscount.
61	6	"Rise (Part 2)"	James Cook	Jack Clough	Jamie Brittain	5 August 2013	0.59
In the final part of Rise, Cook's dalliance with his employer's girlfriend has devastating consequences. Note: Final appearance of Cook.
