= Pandora (Skins) =

- Skins episode
- Emily and Naomi kiss as JJ looks on.
- Episode no.: Season 3 Episode 4
- Directed by: Simon Massey
- Written by: Bryan Elsley; Georgia Lester
- Original air date: 12 February 2009

Guest appearances
- David Baddiel as Steve; Morwenna Banks as Anthea Stonem; Harry Enfield as Jim Stonem; James Fleet as Martin; Henry Garrett as Danny Guillermo; Sally Phillips as Angela Moon

Episode chronology
← Previous "Thomas"	Next → "Freddie"

"Pandora" is the fourth episode of the third series of the British teen drama Skins, which first aired on 12 February 2009 on E4 in both Ireland and the United Kingdom. The episode was written by Bryan Elsley and Georgia Lester, and was directed by Simon Massey. The episode focuses on the character of Pandora Moon (Lisa Backwell), who is miserable after her boyfriend, Thomas Tomone (Merveille Lukeba), recently returned to the Democratic Republic of the Congo. She holds a small pyjama party for her friends, but it descends into chaos when uninvited guests arrive and the food is spiked with drugs. Pandora and Effy get into an argument after both girls have sex with James Cook (Jack O'Connell), but the argument is interrupted when Thomas unexpectedly returns.

"Pandora" was filmed in September 2008. It featured guest appearances by Sally Phillips and Harry Enfield, as well as real-life partners Morwenna Banks and David Baddiel, who play on-screen lovers. The episode brought in 701,000 viewers and was E4's highest-rated programme of the week. It received generally positive reviews from critics. Harry Enfield and James Fleet who both appear in this episode previously starred together as father and son in the 2000 film Kevin & Perry Go Large.

== Plot ==
At the house of her friend, Effy Stonem (Kaya Scodelario), Pandora (Lisa Backwell) tells Effy's mother, Anthea (Morwenna Banks), that she misses Thomas, who recently returned to his country of origin, the Republic of the Congo. Later, Effy's father, Jim (Harry Enfield), discovers his wife's infidelity when his boss, Steve (David Baddiel), arrives at the house, declaring his love for Anthea. Effy grows miserable after Jim leaves the family, and Pandora, desperate for some fun, throws a pyjama party. Effy and Katie Fitch (Megan Prescott) arrive with Pandora at her house for the party and meet her neurotic mother, Angela (Sally Phillips). Disappointed by the lack of boys, drugs and alcohol because of Angela's strict supervision, Katie spikes the brownies that they make with MDMA. As Naomi Campbell (Lily Loveless) and Katie's twin sister, Emily (Kathryn Prescott), arrive together, Naomi urges Emily to admit that she is gay, but Emily denies it. All of the girls indulge in the brownies and Pandora is unhappy to see her mother's behaviour grow increasingly erratic. After Angela is carried into a bedroom to sleep, Pandora locks herself in the bathroom, upset about Thomas's departure and angry with Effy, who she believes spiked the brownies.

Outside, Cook and JJ Jones (Ollie Barbieri) try to sneak into the girls' party. Cook enters the house through a window, but accidentally locks himself inside a wardrobe. After calling his friend, Freddie McClair (Luke Pasqualino), for help, JJ goes into the house by himself and sees Emily and Naomi kissing. Katie, too, witnesses the pair kissing, but is interrupted when her footballer boyfriend, Danny Guillermo (Henry Garrett), and dozens of his friends arrive at the house to crash the party. Hiding from the rest of the party, Effy finds Cook, and they have sex in the wardrobe. They fall through the wall into the next room and find a DVD which shows Angela having sex with her older neighbour, Martin (James Fleet). Freddie comes to take JJ home and confronts Effy about leaving Pandora for Cook. As he leaves, so does Effy.

By the time Pandora comes out of the bathroom, Cook is the only person left at the house. Together they play Twister, which was all Pandora had wanted to do, along with learning from her friends about human sexuality. Cook offers to have sex with her, and they spend the night together. Effy visits Pandora the next morning, and sees Cook share a kiss with her as he leaves. Feeling hurt, she confronts Pandora, but to no avail, as Pandora is slightly empowered after losing her virginity. Pandora defiantly tells Effy that Cook, due to his promiscuity and impulsive, carnal behavior, belongs to no one. Effy appears to understand, and makes no rebuttal. Suddenly, Thomas appears and runs up to Pandora, and she sobs in his arms as a thoughtful Effy looks on.

== Production ==
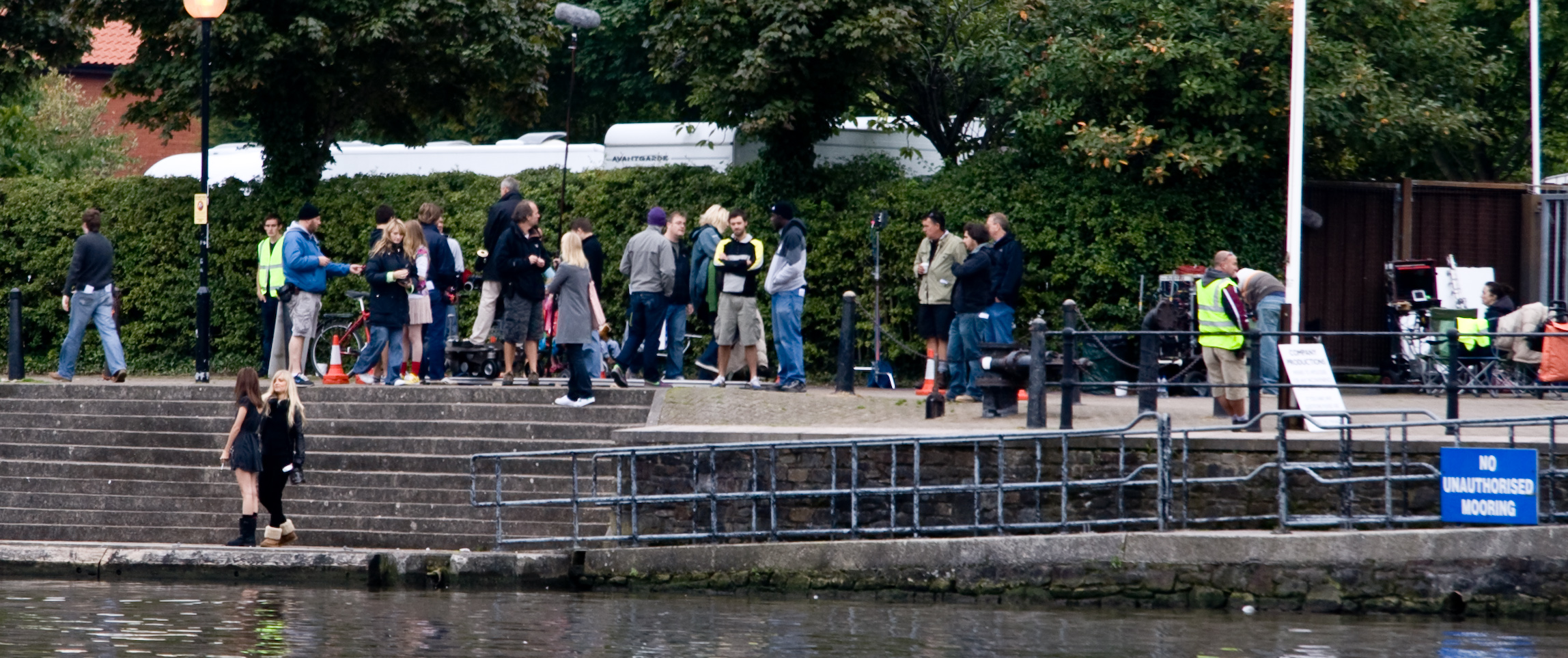
A scene from "Pandora" is filmed at the Bristol Harbour.

"Pandora" was filmed in September 2008 in the same production block as the series' sixth episode, "Naomi", and the series' opening title sequence. Lisa Backwell described filming Pandora's episode as "brilliant" and said that "spending 12 hours everyday [sic] in the loopy world of Pandora wearing wacky floral prints and bright yellow trainers is probably the most fun I've ever had". Comedian David Baddiel appeared in a brief cameo appearance as the lover of Anthea, who is played by Baddiel's real-life partner, Morwenna Banks. Kaya Scodelario said that working with Baddiel was "amazing" and that returning to work with her on-screen parents, Banks and Harry Enfield, after the show's second series was "brilliant". Pandora and her friends' rendition of the nursery rhyme "London's Burning" using kitchen utensils while making brownies was arranged by Fat Segal in homage to Matmos's 1998 album, Quasi-Objects.

== Music ==
- "Dancing On A Wire" by Keygrip
- "London's Burning" by Lisa Backwell, Kaya Scodelario, Megan Prescott and Sally Phillips.
- "Livin' On a Prayer" by Bon Jovi
- "I Kissed a Girl" by Katy Perry
- "The Next Episode" by Dr. Dre & Snoop Dogg
- "Numb/Encore" by Linkin Park & Jay-Z
- "Love Lockdown" by Kanye West

== Reception ==
"Pandora" brought in 701,000 viewers and was E4's highest-rated programme of the week with an audience share of 4.5 percent. Another 165,000 viewers watched the episode an hour after its initial broadcast on E4's timeshift channel, E4+1.

The episode received mostly positive reviews. A critic for PopSugar called "Pandora" a "fantastic episode" and was pleased that Pandora's character "graduated from being random light relief and we got a real insight into her life". They praised each of the "superb" guest actors, particularly Harry Enfield, David Baddiel and Sally Phillips, who she thought played Angela "brilliantly". Digital Spy's Neil Wilkes gave the episode a positive review, describing it as "probably the most outrageous of the series to date". He wrote that the tension between Effy and Freddie "set things up nicely" for the following episode, which focused on Freddie. The entertainment editor for eurOut.org, a website for European lesbians, thought that the episode included "a lot of confusing straight relationship drama" and felt like she was "stuck in high school hell". She wrote, however, that the brownie-making scene was "so ridiculous it's kind of funny" and likened Skins to "Gossip Girl on crack". Jason Hughes of TV Squad felt that within the ensemble cast "most of these kids were so unlikable", though he attributed this to the series "show[ing] us their weaknesses". He found Pandora to be more likable, however, believing that her innocence was "more representative of youth than most of the other characters". One reviewer for lesbian-based website AfterEllen.com called the episode "must-see TV", while another reviewer expressed disapproval of the use of Katy Perry's song, "I Kissed a Girl", in promotional videos for the episode.
