= Skins (American TV series) =

American television series

- Genre: Teen drama; Comedy drama
- Created by: Bryan Elsley; Jamie Brittain
- Written by: Bryan Elsley; Jack Thorne; Ryan O'Nan; Monica Padrick; Jamie Brittain; Mark Hammer; Matt Pelfrey; Maisha Closson; Derek Harvie
- Directed by: Scott Smith; Samir Rehem
- Starring: James Newman; Sofia Black-D'Elia; Jesse Carere; Britne Oldford; Daniel Flaherty; Ron Mustafaa; Rachel Thevenard; Camille Cresencia-Mills; Anastasia Phillips; Eleanor Zichy
- Opening theme: "Lina Magic" by 3D Friends
- Countries of origin: United States; Canada
- Original language: English
- No. of seasons: 1
- No. of episodes: 10

Production
- Executive producers: Bryan Elsley; Derek Harvie
- Production locations: Toronto, Ontario, Canada
- Cinematography: Mitchell Ness
- Camera setup: Single-camera
- Running time: 42 minutes
- Production companies: Company Pictures; Entertainment One; The Movie Network; Movie Central; Storm Dog Films; MTV Production Development

Original release
- Network: MTV
- Release: January 17 – March 21, 2011

Related
- Skins (British TV series)

Skins is a teen comedy-drama television series that premiered on January 17, 2011, on MTV in the United States. It is a remake of the original British show and follows the lives of a group of teenagers through their final two years of high school. As with the British series, the American version features a cast of amateur actors and young writers.

The series generated controversy in the United States over its sexual content, in which several advertisers withdrew and there were some accusations of child pornography since most of its cast members were under the age of 18. On June 9, 2011, MTV announced that they would not renew Skins for a second season, with a statement that "Skins is a global television phenomenon that, unfortunately, did not connect with an American audience as much as we had hoped. We admire the work that the series creator Bryan Elsley did in adapting the show for MTV, and appreciate the core audience that embraced it."

== Cast and characters ==
The characters in the American version are the same as those in the British version, although some first names have been changed and all last names have been changed except for Michelle Richardson. The biggest change comes in the form of new character Tea Marvelli, a lesbian cheerleader who replaces the British character Maxxie Oliver.

- James Newman as Tony Schneider (styled on Tony Stonem of the original British version)

Tony begins the season as the leader of the group, but as his relationship with Michelle starts to crumble due to cheating on her with Tea, his popularity and power within the group crumbles as well. He ends the series with the realization that his friends, particularly Stanley, and his sister Eura mean more to him than he actually thought.

- Rachel Thevenard as Michelle Richardson

In the beginning of the season Michelle is in a relationship with Tony, which causes her to act like she enjoys the role of the good-looking girlfriend and ignore her real feelings. Upon discovery of Tony's affair, she struggles to find herself and confides in Stanley, who has been in love with her for as long as he can remember. She concludes the season choosing Stanley over Tony, finally realizing what is best for her.

- Daniel Flaherty as Stanley Lucerne (styled on Sid Jenkins of the original British version)

Stanley is lazy and insecure, and often is overshadowed by Tony, his best friend and role model. Stanley finally begins to find his voice in "Stanley", when he brings up the courage to stand up to his father, who is so demanding and self-centered that he drives away Stanley's mother. Stanley spends much of the season in love with Michelle, but soon finds himself torn between his feelings for her and Cadie. In the end Stanley chooses Michelle.

- Sofia Black-D'Elia as Tea Marvelli (styled on Maxxie Oliver of the original British version)

Tea is confident, smart, and at times confused about who she is. Tea is a lesbian, but soon finds herself questioning her sexuality by sleeping with Tony on two separate occasions. When Michelle finds out, her friendship with Michelle and relationship with Tony are broken off. At the end she chooses Betty, a girl who had been trying to start a relationship with her for most of the season.

- Ron Mustafaa as Abbud Siddiqui (styled on Anwar Kharral of the original British version)

Abbud is a funny and caring person. He is in love with Tea for half of the season, and then spends the remaining few episodes with feelings for Daisy, with whom he has started a "friends with benefits" type of relationship. Abbud is best friends with Chris, who he takes in after his parents desert him and Tina is forced to leave town.

- Jesse Carere as Chris Collins (styled on Chris Miles of the original British version)

Chris is the party animal of the group. He is loud, energetic, and at a lot of times, either drunk or high on either weed or some type of pill. After his mom abandons for good with nothing more than $1,000, Chris finds hospitality with Tina, who he starts up a relationship with, and then Abbud.

- Britne Oldford as Cadie Campbell (styled on Cassie Ainsworth of the original British version)

Cadie is bipolar, depressed, suicidal, and anorexic. She begins the season with strong feelings for Stanley, but then loses interest. She finds a boyfriend midway through the season, and ends it with feelings for Stanley, but ultimately chooses to let him go for Michelle, knowing it is what is best for him.

- Camille Cresencia-Mills as Daisy Valero (styled on Jal Fazer of the original British version)

Daisy is the one who often has to fix everyone else's problems. She eventually gets fed up with everybody, and tells everybody to stop asking her for help. Her mother left her, and she lives with her father and younger sister, Didi. She is a talented trumpeter and has dreams of becoming a professional. She becomes friends with benefits with Abbud.

- Eleanor Zichy as Eura Schneider (styled on Effy Stonem of the original British version)

Eura is Tony's younger sister, and does not speak. She enjoys partying and drinking, and Tony often helps her sneak in and out of the house. The audience does not hear her voice until the season finale.

=== Minor characters ===
- Ali Kazmi as Abbud's uncle
- Anastasia Phillips as Tina Nolan, a school teacher (styled on Angie of the original British series)
- David Reale as Dave, a schoolteacher
- Randall Blaine Morris as Betty, a love interest for Tea
- Natalie Brown as Cadie's 41-year-old mother, a former model
- Paulino Nunes as Marco Marvelli, Tea's father
- Tony Sims as Jason Morrison, a friend of Chris Collins
- Von Flores as Hamilton Valero, Daisy's father
- Caira Cresencia-Mills as Didi Valero, the younger sister of Daisy

== Episodes ==
The first and the third episodes are both almost shot-for-shot remakes of their British counterpart, but the American show deviates from the British show's plot in subsequent episodes.

No.	Title	Directed by	Written by	Featured character(s)	Original release date	U.S. viewers (millions)
1	"Tony"	Scott Smith	Bryan Elsley	Tony Snyder	January 17, 2011	3.26
Tony wants to help his friend Stanley lose his virginity and enlists the help of his girlfriend, Michelle, with whom Stan is secretly in love. Michelle helps Cadie, who agrees to sleep with Stanley as long as he gets her some drugs. Tony sends Stanley to meet a drug dealer named Mad Mao Le Dong, who forces Stanley to purchase four ounces of weed (thus forcing Stanley to owe him $900). Tony is invited to a party by a rich girl, Tabitha, and he unsuccessfully tries to convince his other friends (Tea, Abbud, Daisy, and Chris) to come along as well. At the party, Stanley watches Tony and Michelle dance together while Cadie overdoses on pills; when Stanley and Cadie go outside to have sex, Cadie ends up passing out. Tea and the others arrive at the party and almost immediately get into a fight with the other guests and the group end up stealing a car to drive Cadie to the hospital. Cadie, however, awakes just as they arrive, seemingly fine. While waiting for Cadie to relieve herself Stanley and Tony accidentally drive the stolen car into a river. Everyone in the car survives the accident, but the weed Stanley purchased is now lost. The episode ends with Stanley and Tony in bed, with Stanley glumly admitting he's still a virgin and Tony responding that it's pathetic.
2	"Tea"	Scott Smith	Bryan Elsley	Tea Marvelli	January 24, 2011	1.58
Tea goes to lesbian nightclub The Northern Soul, where she meets Betty, a classmate who has shown interest in her. Tea takes Betty home where the two have sex; Tea later explains to Betty that it was simply a one night stand and didn't mean anything more than that. When Betty presses Tea for why she doesn't want a relationship, Tea explains that she doesn't feel anyone matches up to her. Tea feels like an outsider in her own family and confides in her grandmother that she likes having sex with girls, but she is bored; she just wants to be with someone interesting. Tea agrees to go out on a blind date arranged by her Italian father to benefit his business connections, not knowing that her blind date is in fact Tony. The two go on a date and get drunk and Tony tells Tea that he is her match. Tea takes Tony to the deserted lesbian club where the two dance, kiss and start to have sex, but stop when Tea begins to laugh, calling it terrible. Although Tea knows that being romantically involved with Tony would be a mistake, she feels like she has a strong connection with him. At home, she seeks solace from her grandmother, who reveals that she was once in love with a woman who ultimately rejected her due to religious and social norms. At school the next day, Betty kisses Tea in front of the whole school, causing Tony's jealousy to grow. He later calls her, seeking a connection, but she once again rejects both him and Betty, who also calls. The episode ends with Tea dancing alone in her grandmother's room. Meanwhile, Stanley's worries over his debt to Mad Mao Le Dong intensify when Mad visits the school. Mad follows and then confronts Tea, threatening her and calling her a dyke (which Tea's father overhears but mistakes for the word kike; Tea is half Jewish on her mother's side). Mad is then disposed of by Tea's father and his friends.
3	"Chris"	Scott Smith	Jack Thorne and Ryan O'Nan	Chris Collins	January 31, 2011	1.45
Party-animal Chris awakens to an erection and to find that his mother, a single parent, has left Chris alone along with $1000 cash in an envelope, promising to return in a few days. Chris, known for his recklessness and at Tony's behest, spends the money on an expensive stereo system and drugs and throws a house party which is overwhelmed by gatecrashers. Among the party's invitees is Chris's teacher Tina, for whom he has romantic feelings, although she claims she does not reciprocate. At Chris's request they share a dance, although Tina leaves hurriedly when she realises Chris has an erection, a result of his experimentation with a Viagra-like drug. Meanwhile, Stanley continues his quest to lose his virginity, but agrees with Cadie that they should stop pretending they have slept together. The morning after the party, Chris awakens to his house in disarray and realises his mother has left for good, taking all her possessions with her. A squatter has taken up residence in his bathroom following the previous night's party, and they fight, resulting in Chris being locked out of his own house, which has been largely destroyed. Chris seeks solace in Tina and Daisy, to whom he reveals that he does have an estranged father. At Daisy's insistence they visit Chris's father's new family, but are met with hostility. Chris flees to the nearby cemetery, where he confides to Daisy that he once had an older brother, Peter, who died as a teenager. He further reveals that he knows his mother has not left town, as she has also been by the cemetery and left fresh flowers at Peter's gravesite. Without a home to return to, Tina offers Chris temporary accommodation in her own house.
4	"Cadie"	Samir Rehem	Monica Padrick	Cadie Campbell	February 7, 2011	1.19
Cadie's life is a mess; she's ignored by her parents and constantly sent to doctors to be given more drugs to treat a variety of mental illnesses (depression, anxiety, pathological lying, and obsessive-compulsive disorder). When Cadie attempts to bond with her father, she ends up fantasizing about killing him. Stanley calls Cadie in order to trick her into bringing all her pills to Michelle's party, saying it would be their date – however, at the party Cadie is ignored by Stanley, who is still in love with Michelle; Stanley confesses to Michelle that Tony has been lying about Cadie and Stanley sleeping together. Cadie attempts to connect with the others in the group but ultimately fails; Eura doesn't speak to her, Abbud is only interested in pills, Chris says Cadie just needs to show more skin, Meanwhile, Tony continues to pursue Tea; Tea once again rejects him, telling him to just leave her alone. Cadie overhears and confronts Tony about this, telling him that he can't just keep doing whatever he wants. Tea then confesses that Cadie is just being used by Stanley. As the party continues, Cadie is pursued by Michelle's mother's boyfriend; she eventually gives in to his advances and the two begin to have sex, but are interrupted by Stanley. Stanley tells Cadie that he cares about her, but Cadie leaves angrily, feeling that everyone has disappointed her. The episode ends with Cadie chasing away pigeons (which terrify her) and going home, where she lies on her bed, deeply depressed. She ends up taking her pills like her mother tells her to and states, "See? I'm happy."
5	"Stanley"	Samir Rehem	Jamie Brittain and Mark Hammer	Stanley Lucerne	February 14, 2011	0.96
Stanley's parents find out about his ditching of class and forged excuse notes, and he learns if he misses another class, he would have to repeat the 11th grade. The next day, his patient mom and his crazy father both have different methods of waking him up, which both fail. He misses the bus for school, and "borrows" his dad's old car to just barely make it to class. The gang finds out about Stanley's "new ride" and takes Michelle to Tony's choir recital. At the end of the song, Tony and Tabitha kiss, which angers Michelle. The two girls fight, and Tony offers Michelle to Stanley. Upon taking her home, Michelle believes Stanley was a part of Tony's scheme, and kisses him out of anger and pity. When Stanley goes home for rest, Tony asks him to take him home from Tabitha's mansion. In the car Stan berates Tony on how he always gets Stan in trouble and will not listen to him anymore. Immediately after, Tony tells Stan to turn into the nearby military air base. Stan then drives violently over a speed bump and the car starts smoking; at the behest of Tony, Stan tries to drive off of the base but the car breaks down and explodes into flames. Stanley gets Grand Theft Auto charges which Stanley's father refuses to sign for, making Stanley have to go to court. Later there is a party at the beach and Stanley and Michelle reconcile, dancing together. Soon, however, Tony reclaims his girlfriend. Stanley leaves angered. Then the court date approaches and the judge dismisses the case, even calling Stan's father a bastard in the process. When he and his dad go home, Stanley finds out that his mom left (she still cares about Stanley, just not his father). Stanley tries to get his dad to fix the situation, but he doesn't. They have a heart to heart in their charred vehicle in the garage.
6	"Abbud"	Scott Smith	Matt Pelfrey	Abbud Siddiqui	February 21, 2011	0.97
The group (minus Cadie) takes a class trip to Canada and into the woods for a nature retreat. At the border, Stanley smuggles weed in by shoving it up his butt. Stanley later claims that his butt "swallowed it up further", annoying and amusing everyone. Meanwhile, in Canada, Dave (a teacher) continuously attempts to hook up with Tina. In an attempt to arouse her, he doesn't watch the road but ends up hitting a moose. He tries to kill it humanely, but it gets up unharmed after a few moments. Throughout the trip, Abbud sees a "psycho killer" in the woods. In the teacher's tent, Chris tells Tina he loves her, and they kiss. Later, in order to get high, the guys eat wild mushrooms and lick a toad, but it only causes them to throw up everywhere. Abbud tries to kiss Tea, but she insists that she only likes girls. He later finds Tea and Tony having sex in a shed, and feels betrayed. The next morning he and Tea begin to talk at the top of a courage pole. Abbud begins yelling at Tea, calling her a "fake" and "not a real lesbian", and stands up, causing him to fall. He has minor injuries and is taken to the hospital, after apologizing to Tea. Minor Subplot: Michelle is frustrated that Tony is losing interest in her.
7	"Michelle"	Samir Rehem	Maisha Closson	Michelle Richardson	February 28, 2011	1.17
Michelle is suspicious of Tony after he disses her at a rave, by pretending not to hear her when she says "I love you" repeatedly. She later goes to the clinic to get birth control, but the doctor mistakes her for her mother and performs a full check-up. Meanwhile, Tea tries to have a relationship with Betty. The doctor later informs Michelle that she has chlamydia. Since she did not cheat, she finally realizes that Tony must have been sleeping with someone else. She finds out that all of her friends knew and didn't tell her a thing. Stanley confronts Tony, and tries to attack him, but misses and breaks his nose. Michelle seeks help from her promiscuous mother, who tells her not to fall in love. Stanley finds out Cadie is out of rehab, but that she is seeing a new guy. The next day, Michelle finds out Tony cheated on her with Tea when she bumps into Tea's backpack and the antibiotics to treat Chlamydia fall out. Michelle then goes to Stanley's house and tries to seduce him, but Stan climaxes prematurely and nothing else happens between them. Michelle returns home to see Tea waiting for her, wanting to apologize, but she rejects her, and says it's the first time she's ever seen Tea cry. Later, Michelle rips up all of her photos of her and Tony and throws them in the hot tub. She invites Tony over to talk, and they have sex. After, she tells Tony to leave and never come back again. Later, Betty is seen walking to the bus station, where she finds Michelle. The two take a trip to Boston together.
8	"Daisy"	Samir Rehem	Jamie Brittain and Bryan Elsley	Daisy Valero	March 7, 2011	1.09
Daisy spends her time caring for others and never has any fun for herself. She loves playing her trumpet and her sister loves singing, but has a strict dad who hates all kinds of music, along with an absent mom. When Daisy decides to have casual sex with Abbud, they discover that Daisy's sister has thrown a party in their apartment and is singing rap to everyone. Eura, Tony's sister, is there and is a total wreck. Abbud, grabs the microphone from Daisy's sister and pretends he is the police causing everyone to run, except Eura, who has passed out on the floor. After calling the gang to help clean up the party before Daisy's father returns home, Chris finds Daisy's father's piano, which got destroyed by the party. When Daisy and Abbud try for a second attempt to have sex, Daisy's father comes home early to discover his broken piano. Daisy takes the blame although she took no part in the destruction and her father demands she hands over her saved up money for her college music audition to pay for the rent. Abbud challenges Daisy's father, but Daisy tells him to go, and he storms out the door. As Abbud tries to take Daisy's money to avoid it being taken by her father, they finally have sex which ends with Abbud running out the door in joy. The next day, Daisy is trying out for a prestige band which she drops out of because she feels guilty of lying to her father. The last scene shows Daisy's sister greeting her dad at the door and showing him the new piano that Daisy bought for him with her college money. The episode ends with Daisy and her father playing music together.
9	"Tina"	Scott Smith	Derek Harvie	Tina Nolan	March 14, 2011	1.11
The episode begins with Tina and Chris having sex in Abbud's "treehouse" when Tina hits her head and begins to cry. Chris attempts to console her and she reveals that it is her birthday. Abbud finds the two and Tina bribes him with an offer of an "A" in her class to keep quiet. Tina later flirts with her neighbor after having doubts about her relationship with Chris and comes onto him, only to get rejected. Later at school, Tina is grading essays and reads a very explicit essay written by Chris detailing how he plans to have sex with her tonight. Dave picks up the paper and reads the title, to which Tina reacts harshly and snatches the paper back. Dave then shows Tina a miniature steam engine, and a series of houses so he can figure out where it is she lives in an attempt to woo her later that night. Dave's steam engine is later stolen. Tina sees her neighbor, Evan, walking in the rain and offers him a ride and asks for a date for her birthday. He obliges and the next scene is them in Tina's car in front of a fast food restaurant eating burgers. Tina comes onto Evan by attempting to engage in oral sex with him. He declines, calling her childish, and leaves. Tina arrives home to see Chris has thrown her a surprise party. Unhappy about recent turns of events, she helps a student with work. The party-goers vandalize Tina's house and Chris deftly kicks them all out. Chris apologizes and offers Tina two presents: Dave's steam engine and sex. Dave, having found Tina's apartment, walks into the building and into her room to catch Chris having sex with her, and his steam engine toy exploding. Dave has Tina arrested on counts of child molestation and she is thrown in jail. Chris, Abbud, and Stanley are called in as witnesses and attempt to defend Tina. It is later revealed that Tina has been fired, is moving back in with her parents, and is a suspected sex offender required by law to tell her neighbors. Chris sends her flowers and a card telling her to call him. As she is not allowed to talk to him anymore, she deletes his number from her phone, and Chris knowing she will not call throws away his phone in a depressed rage.
10	"Eura"	Scott Smith	Bryan Elsley	Everyone	March 21, 2011	1.17
The series finale. Tony is in a depression over Tea, and his younger sister, Eura (who doesn't speak) attempts to comfort him. She also seeks attention from her parents by stripping down and pouring yogurt all over herself, but they do not notice. In an attempt to resolve Tony's problems, she tricks everyone into thinking she's been kidnapped and leads them to a concert, where Stanley finds her and tries to take her but is stopped by security. He then gets on the stage and begins to sing, alongside Cadie. The episode ends with Tony and Eura being brought home by their father and Eura finally speaking, Tea sleeping with Betty at the hospital, where she is getting an ankle operation, Abbud revealing his love to Daisy and the two having sex, and Michelle kissing Stanley while Chris stays over at his house.

== Production ==
=== Development ===
Elsley said he was first approached on making an American adaptation by MTV's Liz Gateley and Tony DiSanto. Elsley said that at the time he didn't feel that an American version would work. Several network and cable channels also approached Elsley about a North American adaptation. Elsley said "at that end of that time it seemed clear that MTV had the clearest vision." He added "[the other networks] were missing a commitment to the core values of the show. Which is to say that MTV is clearly taking a risk with this show, and they were prepared to take that risk."

In early 2009, Elsley began finding writers for the North American version. Elsley said "We started at the top of the Hollywood tree and worked our way down, and it wasn't until we got to the bottom that we actually found writers we liked. We started saying to agents, 'Who have you just taken on? Who's got a great play on somewhere?' And that turned up just incredible writers that have never done anything." After reading 400 scripts around the clock, a team of six was formed with MTV ordered a pilot for the American division in August 2009, with MTV ordering a full series one year later in May 2010.

=== Casting ===
Skins cast; From left to right: Chris, Tea, Abbud, Tony, Michelle, Daisy, Stanley, Cadie and Eura.

Open casting calls were held in New York City. Six of the nine main cast members had never acted before. Elsley said "It's very important to us that the kids are not seasoned professionals" in keeping with British version where most had no prior acting experience.

James Newman, who plays Tony Snyder, was urged to audition for Skins by his older brother. Newman missed the audition but attended a later audition where he won the role. Ron Mustafaa, who plays Abbud Siddiqui, went to the open call for the show because his mother was a big fan of Dev Patel (who plays Abbud's UK Skins equivalent), Anwar, and wanted Mustafaa to "be the next Slumdog."

=== Filming ===
The show production began in mid 2010 in Toronto, changed from the initially planned location of Baltimore.

== Reception ==
=== Critical response ===
Metacritic gives the series a weighted average score of 57% based on reviews from 17 critics, indicating "mixed or average reviews".

James Poniewozik of Time magazine concluded that the show is tamer than the British original, but believes if the controversial subject matter leaves parents reaching for antacid, then the show is doing its job. Although the show is raunchy, Poniewozik judges Skins to have "more sweetness than snarky teen soaps like Gossip Girl". He questions if this American remake of a British show will be able to find its American voice, but commends the strong source material. He calls the show "unsettling, flawed but ambitious" and credits it with the secret that "it wears its heart on its skin".

Troy Patterson of Slate describes the show as a "sporadically excellent adaption" that is "superior teensploitation, enabling youth to rejoice in the fantasy of their corruption". He admonishes those who call the show child pornography, scolding them for "trivializing terrible crimes with flabby language" and judges it to be more an indication of the show's success that it angers some parents and sets itself on the far side of a generation gap.

=== Controversy ===
The show has garnered controversy from various conservative groups for its teenage depictions of casual sex and drug use, especially with regard to underage actors. In the wake of a mounting scandal over a possible child pornography investigation of MTV as a result of the show's content, Yum! Brands (Taco Bell), Mars, Incorporated (Wrigley), General Motors, Doctor's Associates (Subway), Foot Locker, H&R Block, Schick, Guthy-Renker (Proactiv), L'Oréal, Reckitt Benckiser (Clearasil) and Kraft all opted to pull their advertising from the program.

The Parents Television Council filed a letter to the Department of Justice, asking them to bring a child pornography charge against the series, alleging a violation of 18 USC 1466A.

Due to the controversy in the U.S. and because the show is made in Canada, Bob Tarantino, an entertainment and intellectual property lawyer, reviewed section 163.1 of the Canadian Criminal Code and found that "it would be exceedingly unlikely that Skins would be found to constitute 'child pornography' for purposes of Canadian criminal law."

In 2011, MTV rated the series "TV-MA", meaning that it is unsuitable for viewers under the age of 17. Nielsen reported that 1.2 million of the premiere episode's 3 million viewers were under the age of 18. MTV told advertisers, "Now is the time to influence their choices." They also defended the show, stating that it addresses "real-world issues" teenagers are confronted with on a daily basis, and in a "frank" way. "We are confident that the episodes of Skins will not only comply with all applicable legal requirements, but also with our responsibilities to our viewers," they said.

=== Ratings ===
The series debut had 3.26 million viewers, with a 3.4 rating and 2.7 million viewers in the 12-34 demo, the most viewers in that demo for a show launch in MTV history. However, its demo rating was down 55% from its lead-in, Jersey Shore, which drew 7.7 million viewers. The second episode dropped to 1.6 million viewers, with a 1.0 share and 1.4 million viewers in the key demo. The third episode did not fare much better, dipping to 1.5 million viewers. Episodes 4 through 10 averaged about 1 million viewers, peaking at 1.2 million for episode 4 and hitting its lowest point at 0.962 million for episode 5. The last four episodes (7 through 10) got 1.170, 1.088, 1.107 and 1.2 million viewers respectively.

=== Cancellation ===
On June 9, it was announced that MTV had canceled Skins because it wasn't connecting to the U.S. audience, in addition to the controversy that went with it. Elsley defended the show's content as not so much controversial, "but a serious attempt to get in the roots of young people's lives."
