= Emily Fitch =

Fictional character from Skins

- Skins character
- Kathryn Prescott as Emily Fitch
- First appearance: "Everyone" (episode 3.01)
- Last appearance: "Fire Pt. 2" (episode 7.02)
- Created by: Bryan Elsley and Jamie Brittain
- Portrayed by: Kathryn Prescott
- Seasons: 3-4, 7
- Centric episode(s): "Katie and Emily" (episode 3.09) "Emily" (episode 4.02)

In-universe information
- Occupation: Student
- Family: Rob Fitch (father); Jenna Fitch (mother); Katie Fitch (twin sister); James Fitch (younger brother)

Emily Fitch is a fictional character in the television series Skins, played by Kathryn Prescott. She is introduced in the third series as the show's "second generation" of characters. Her twin sister Katie is played by Kathryn's real-life twin Megan Prescott.

== Characterisation ==
On her blog, Emily notes her name means "to rival" which she finds ironic, as she's a twin. What's even more ironic to her is that her sister's name means "pure and virginal," a nod to how many boyfriends Katie has had.

With her introverted personality, Emily is often taken advantage by Katie and often depends on her to be the dynamic one out of the two. At the beginning of series 3, Emily is a closeted lesbian, but she eventually comes out to her friends, family and Naomi Campbell, the girl she is in love with. She also begins to come out of her shell and strive for individuality. In her most difficult times, she finds a source of support in her friendship with JJ Jones, after running into him at a clinic where she was receiving a course of counselling and learning about his Asperger syndrome. It is to him that she first confides about her homosexuality, in turn encouraging him to take control of Freddie and Cook's feud, and it is to her that he finally loses his virginity.

Emily's character becomes more confident in series 4, following her coming out and subsequent relationship with Naomi. Prescott accidentally let slip that the couple "die happy" in relation to not being able to act as Emily in the following series.

Ed Hime, writer of Emily's series 4 episode stated that "hugeness of Emily’s love makes her unique in Skins world and those kinds of people are scary to be in relationships". He commented that Emily has the traits of an "intrepid detective", citing Emily's traits - "her purity, intelligence, bravery and tenacity" are "traits that make a great private eye". Ed Hime praised Prescott for having "beautiful eyes that just take everything in" and stated that she was great at "giving Naomi longing looks".

Prescott commented that she "thought Naomi was a bitch" for cheating, pointing out costar Loveless would agree as well, but had let slip that the couple end up happy.

== Character history ==
Emily was born in 1992 to Rob and Jenna Fitch. She is the younger twin, often being overshadowed by Katie due to her introverted personality. Growing up, the two made up a secret language only each other could understand, called "Twin".

=== Series 3 ===
Emily's first appearance in the series occurs when she is getting ready for her first day at Roundview College. Angry at her sister for using all the hot water and taking her clothes, Emily resigns herself to getting a ride to college from Katie's boyfriend Danny, who comments that she should be more like her sister. During the assembly, Emily can be seen observing Naomi, who appears to be angry and shocked at the same time over the fact that they're going to be in the same form. Before class, Effy comments that Emily is like a "doormat". Introducing herself, Emily reveals her on interesting fact is that she has never had a boyfriend, in contrast to Katie's statement.

At Cook's birthday party, Emily tells Katie that she was straight, not the other way around. She states that "she just felt like kissing somebody" but later apologises to Naomi. During Pandora's pyjama party, Emily kisses Naomi, to which the latter reciprocates, who reasons "it's just the drugs". Unknown to her, Katie actually sees Naomi and Emily kissing for the second time in the bouncy castle and appears to be shaken.

In the "Naomi" centric episode, Emily encourages Naomi to run for president, but Naomi refuses. Later when Naomi arrives home, Emily is found waiting with another registration form in the Naomi's room. Emily decided to leave when Naomi is rude and standoffish to her but just before she does so, Emily confronts her coldly telling her that she is not obsessed with pursuing a sexual relationship with her. Naomi suggests she stay the night with her, the two ending up drunk.

The following morning, Emily wakes up alone; Naomi having left for college. Emily leaves a note in Naomi's bed saying that she slept there, where the latter cries herself to sleep following the humiliation of Cook's presidential campaign.

After, Naomi and Emily escape to the countryside the next day and cycle to one of Emily's favourite places by a lake. After swimming in the lake, they light a campfire. The two then kiss and proceed to make love. Emily wakes up the following morning to find Naomi preparing to leave. She pleas for Naomi not to leave her a second time, and telling her that she should accept that she needs to be loved. That night, she visits Emily's house, but Emily refuses to open the door, not wanting Naomi to see her after she had been crying. They sit on opposite sides of the door, and Naomi admits that she does need somebody to love her. Emily offers her hand through the door's catflap to Naomi, who finally reciprocates Emily's feelings.

In JJ, Emily meets JJ at a clinic where she is getting counselling to be more truthful about herself, and secretly confides to him about her homosexuality, which he accidentally lets slip to Katie. In return, Emily encourages him to take control of Cook and Freddie's feud and make peace with Effy. At the end of the episode, she offers to take JJ's virginity, which he does.

In Katie and Emily's centric episode, Katie's injuries after the incident with Effy in the woods make her too embarrassed to leave the house, so Emily disguises herself as her sister and sits for her history exam. Katie ignores Emily when her sister comes out to her, telling her "you're not gay, you're just stupid". Unknown to Emily, Katie later confronts Naomi after Emily comes out to her parents, telling her to stay away from Emily, also telling Naomi that Emily slept with JJ while she and Naomi were having problems; thus causing Emily and Naomi to fight. This enables Emily and Katie to go to the school ball with JJ and Freddie (respectively). Eventually, Naomi shows up at the ball, angry at Emily for not telling her about JJ. Emily later overhears Naomi and Katie arguing, and pulls Katie away, both fighting each other in front of everyone. Emily gains the upper hand but doesn't hurt her sister, instead picking her up and saying that she loves Katie, but Emily isn't her and that she is her own person, which is something she needs to accept. With Katie finally acknowledging her sister, Emily walks off happily with Naomi.

=== Skins: The Novel ===
The novel, written by Ali Cronin describes the summer between series 3 and 4. Emily and Naomi are happily together, but Emily must join her family for a vacation to France. Naomi worries about her future, debating whether to choose Emily or further her education. Matters are made worse when Katie takes Emily's phone away, thus effectively cutting off the two from communicating with each other. In the end, Emily notes that she herself is selfish, even though Naomi and herself made up she is preventing Naomi from pursuing her education.

=== Series 4 ===
Emily's first appears in series 4 at a nightclub, kissing Naomi. She's visibly shocked when Sophia commits suicide, unaware that Sophia has passed by her several minutes before.

Her centric episode focuses on the couple's happiness, but Emily becomes suspicious when the police turns up and interviews them both on Sophia's suicide. Behind Naomi's back, Emily visits Sophia's family, taking a wooden box and a university prospectus with a key inside. She leaves and later, when flicking through the prospectus, she finds a photo of Sophia laughing with Naomi. She realises that Naomi did in fact know the dead girl and suspects that she might have cheated on her with Sophia. She interrupts Naomi's class by slamming the picture of Sophia and Naomi into the window, the two argue about lying and Naomi admits that she indeed met Sophia at a university open day which she was attending behind Emily's back. She insists they just talked and that nothing had happened between them. Still a bit doubtful, Emily tells her about the key she found and Naomi believes it is for Sophia's locker at the army base. They discover that Sophia was infatuated with Naomi and Emily makes up with her, having sex with Naomi in an army storage closet.

Later, Emily, unable to understand why their mother can't accept her homosexuality and her relationship with Naomi, decides to move out leaving Katie heartbroken. Emily becomes suspicious when Naomi talks to other girls during a party. At dawn, Emily meets up with Sophia's brother, Matt, to open up the box. Despite Naomi showing up and telling Emily to forget it, Emily goes to the roof and opens the box to find Sophia's sketchbook. Through Sophia's drawings that depict her one-day affair with Naomi, Emily finds out that Naomi did in fact cheat on her. A distraught Emily leaves the roof with Naomi crying and calling after her.

Emily returns home and tearfully tells her father that Naomi had cheated on her. As he consoles her, Rob tells her that he once cheated on Jenna, and that she should not worry as it gets better after it is worse. Emily goes back to Naomi's house, reading a note on the front door saying, "I'll do anything". The episode ends with Emily walking through the front door, seemingly following her father's advice.

When Rob Fitch declares he's bankrupt, the entire Fitch family moves into Naomi's house, much to the anger of Emily. Emily throws an impromptu BBQ with revellers from the night before, Katie watches as Emily carries on the hedonism, Naomi blatantly doesn't want to be there, and Emily wants more pills. Then Emily turns increasingly angry and hedonistic, kissing a girl in front of everyone then pushing Naomi into the pool. Revealing her secret about Sophia, Naomi watches as Emily bursts into tears and lashes out at her mother, earning a slap from Katie. The twins later reconcile however, when Katie realises how heartbroken Emily is.

Emily receives two Bs and a C from her A-Levels.

In the finale, Emily and Naomi's relationship are on the rocks. However, Emily later forgives Naomi after hearing the latter's confession of loving Emily since she was 12. Moved by the heartfelt confession, the two make amends and are seen being happy together.

=== Series 7 ===
In season 7, Emily reappears in the two-part episode Skins Fire. She does not physically appear in part one although she is heard having an argument with Naomi, now living in London with Effy Stonem over Skype, and it is made clear that she is in New York City on a lucrative internship. Naomi is missing her enormously, and her close friendship with Effy is the only thing keeping her going.

Emily appears in person in part two, having gotten some time off on her internship, and has decided to visit Naomi in London. Secretly, Naomi resists Effy's urging to tell Emily about her recent cancer diagnosis, saying that if she were to do so, Emily would drop everything and return to London at once, and the internship she worked so hard to get would be over, and her cancer is not yet serious. However, as Naomi's cancer progresses and eventually becomes terminal, Naomi becomes devastated at the inevitable pain she will have to cause Emily now that she has left it so late to tell her. Eventually, Emily is informed, and Effy greets her at the airport. A devastated Emily wordlessly slaps her across the face, before getting upset with her for having spent the time with Naomi that she could have spent, and tells her not to follow her to the hospital. Later on, however, Effy enters the hospital to find Emily has not yet entered Naomi's room, and she admits she doesn't know how she can forgive Naomi for not telling her sooner. Effy consoles her as she breaks down in tears and acknowledges that Naomi will die, and urges her to be strong for her as Naomi was when Emily fell out with her family. Bracing herself, Emily enters Naomi's room and climbs into bed with her, embracing her and sobbing into her shoulder. Naomi gives Effy a smile over her shoulder, happy that she can die peacefully with her beloved Emily by her side.

== Production ==
During Naomi's episode in series 3, stylist Kirstie Stanway began to differentiate between Emily and her twin sister Katie's hair and makeup to show that the twins are starting to "move along their own paths". Originally, an entire scene was supposed to be filmed with Naomi and Emily in the lake, but the water was so cold that the actors were unable to stay in the water, and Kathryn Prescott was taken to a standby ambulance with suspected hypothermia. Director Simon Massey choreographed Naomi and Emily's sex scene prior to filming so that, on the set, the actions would come instinctively to the actors and they would be able to complete the scene in a limited number of takes. Prescott stated that the scene concerned her, though she said that she was not pressured to do anything in the script that made her uncomfortable.

== Reception ==
The "Naomily" storyline of Series 3 and 4 proved popular with lesbian viewers; a poll conducted by American gay women's media website AfterEllen.com ranked Naomi and Emily as the top two fictional lesbian and bisexual characters. AfterEllen.com also ranked her No.4 in their Top 50 Favorite Female TV Characters. Emily has consistently been described as "brave".

A critic for PopSugar found Emily's plea to Naomi as Naomi left the campsite "heartbreaking".
