= Henry Garrett (actor) =

English actor

- Born: Bristol, England
- Occupation: Actor
- Years active: 2007–present

Henry Garrett is an English actor. He studied at the Lee Strasberg Theatre and Film Institute in New York.

== Career ==
Garrett played the recurring role of Captain McNeil in the first two series of BBC's Poldark. He played Pete McCullough in the main cast of AMC's The Son.

== Filmography ==
=== Film ===
| Year | Title | Role | Notes |
|---|---|---|---|
| 2007 | Hell for Leonard | Joe | Short film |
| 2008 | Actually, Adieu My Love | Jack | |
| 2009 | The Boxer | Kevin | |
| 2009 | Visions | Mathew | |
| 2009 | The Fading Light | Timothy | |
| 2011 | The Wicker Tree | Steve Thomson | |
| 2012 | Red Tails | Hart | |
| 2012 | Anonymous | Simon | Short film |
| 2012 | Zero Dark Thirty | Bagram Guard | |
| 2012 | Rabbit Foot | Arrow | Short film |
| 2013 | The Arbiter | Richard | |
| 2013 | Beat | Aggressive Customer | Short film |
| 2014 | Pride | Man | |
| 2014 | Happy Thoughts | Peter | Short film |
| 2014 | A Little Chaos | Vincent | |
| 2014 | Testament of Youth | George Catlin | |
| 2014 | A Moment to Move | John | Short film |
| 2015 | Dániel | Tom | Short film |
| 2015 | Re-Kill | Redneck | |
| 2015 | Still Water | Gardener | Short film |
| 2016 | Criminal | Air Force Technician | |
| 2017 | Lascivious Grace | Will Sadler | Short film |
| 2018 | Boys on Film 18: Heroes | Tom | |
| 2018 | London Fields | Dink Heckler | |
| 2021 | Outside the Wire | Brydon | |
| 2023 | Indiana Jones and the Dial of Destiny | Louis - Drunk Airline Pilot | |
| 2025 | The Last Supper | Nicodemus | |
| 2025 | The Amateur | Chief of Staff | |
| 2025 | Sweet Brother | Avarice | |
| 2027 | Alone at Dawn | TBA | Post-production |

=== Television ===
| Year | Title | Role | Notes |
|---|---|---|---|
| 2007 | Casualty | Jason Fletcher | Episode: "(What's So Funny 'Bout) Peace, Love and Understanding" |
| 2008 | Human Body: Pushing the Limits | Firefighter | Episode: "Brain Power" |
| 2008 | EastEnders | Dean | Episode: "8 July 2008" |
| 2008 | Doctors | Brian Ridgly | Episode: "Destiny Day" |
| 2008 | The Bill | Tom Norris | 4 episodes |
| 2009 | Skins | Danny | Episodes: "Everyone" & "Pandora" |
| 2009 | Mistresses | Young Man | Episode: "Series 2, Episode 1" |
| 2010 | Material Girl | Joel | Episode: "Series 1, Episode 6" |
| 2010 | Missing | Matthew Green | Episode: "Series 2, Episode 9" |
| 2010 | Ashes to Ashes | Steve Smith | Episode: "Series 3, Episode 3" |
| 2010 | Midsomer Murders | John Kinsella | Episode: "The Noble Art" |
| 2011 | Waking the Dead | Greg Potts | Episode: "Waterloo, Part 2" |
| 2012 | Holby City | Charlie Marsdyke | Episode: "You and Me" |
| 2014 | Peaky Blinders | Clive Macmillan | 2 episodes |
| 2015 | Foyle's War | Neville Smith | Episode: "Elise" |
| 2015 | Atlantis | Diocles | 3 episodes |
| 2015 | New Tricks | Gareth Clarke | Episode: "Lottery Curse" |
| 2015–16 | Poldark | Captain Malcolm McNeil | Recurring role (series 1–2) |
| 2017 | Stan Lee's Lucky Man | Jay Tate | Episode: "Lamb to the Slaughter" |
| 2017–19 | The Son | Pete McCullough | Main cast |
| 2019 | Dark Money | Mitch Colney | Miniseries; 2 episodes |
| 2022 | This England | Archie Bland | 4 episodes |
| 2022 | EastEnders | Archie Mitchell | Episode 6550 |
| 2023 | Silo | Douglas Trumbull | 3 episodes |
