= Skins Fire =

- Skins episodes
- Episode nos.: Series 7 Episodes 1–2
- Directed by: Charles Martin
- Written by: Jess Brittain
- Original air dates: 1 July 2013 (7.01); 8 July 2013 (7.02)

Guest appearances
- Lily Loveless as Naomi Campbell; Kathryn Prescott as Emily Fitch; Lara Pulver as Victoria; Kayvan Novak as Jake; Craig Roberts as Dominic; Amy Wren as Jane

Episode chronology
| ← Previous "Finale" | Next → "Skins Pure" |

"Skins Fire" is a feature-length episode of E4 television series Skins. It aired in two parts in 2013 as part of a specially-commissioned seventh season marking the end of the programme. The first six series of Skins aired from 2007 to 2012, a teen drama focusing on the lives of three separate casts of Bristolian teenagers. While previous stories in the series were teen dramas, "Skins Fire" like other stories in the seventh season revisits characters from the show's first two casts, now facing young adulthood.

"Skins Fire" focuses on Kaya Scodelario's Effy Stonem, who appeared in the first four series of the show. In the story, former party girl Effy is a receptionist and later a stock trader for a London hedge fund who becomes embroiled in an insider trading scandal. Effy lives with Naomi Campbell (Lily Loveless), who is now her best friend. An ambitious idealist in the show's third and fourth series, Naomi in the present day finds herself drifting through life without a steady income when she is diagnosed with cancer.

== Synopsis ==
=== Part 1 ===
Effy - now aged 21, is working a dead-end job as a receptionist for a leading London hedge fund and flatshares with Naomi Campbell, while Emily is in New York on an internship. Her life is dull, and her only relief comes in the form of cigarette breaks with her colleague, Jane (Amy Wren), and Dominic (Craig Roberts), a market researcher from a different company, who has a crush on her. Her home life is little better, having to deal with Naomi's slacking, increasingly inconsiderate nature and emotional neediness. Secretly Naomi has been suffering from severe abdominal pains, and avoiding going to the doctor.

Whilst on the train home from work, Effy spots a mistake in the figures of one of the company reports she has been asked to print, and mentions it to her superior, Victoria (Lara Pulver). Victoria, a stock trader who is in a relationship with the head of the company, Jake (Kayvan Novak), pretends to ignore her, only to take credit for the discovery at the next board meeting. Angry and frustrated, Effy asks Dominic to teach her the skills of the trade. After a couple of sessions with him, she deliberately fails to inform one of Victoria's investors of a delay in their meeting and holds the meeting herself. Victoria is angered, but Jake is impressed by her initiative and skills in the trade, and offers her a job on the trade floor. Months later, Victoria has left the company after a falling out with Jake, but Effy is struggling to keep up, due to her lack of experience or real knowledge of the industry. Wanting another big breakthrough, Effy approaches Dominic again and manipulates him to illegally give her some useful financial information, with which she makes her company over a million pounds. She and Jake then begin a relationship. Naomi, deciding to try and pursue stand up comedy, attends an open-mic night at a comedy bar with Effy; the gig is a disaster when Naomi's weak material falls flat, and she has to deal with homophobic hecklers. After finally visiting the doctor, Naomi is devastated to learn that she has cancer.

=== Part 2 ===
A few months later, Naomi is finding greater success as a stand-up comedian. Effy and Jake are still together. And to Naomi's delight, Emily flies out for a visit, although she resists telling her about her diagnosis. Things are getting difficult at the Hedge Fund, however, and Jake, upon learning that Effy had help in her previous breakthrough, quietly implores her to do it again. At the same time, Naomi's oncologist informs her that her radiotherapy hasn't worked, and that she will have to start chemotherapy. Needing her breakthrough for both her own and Naomi's sakes, Effy goes back to Dominic and asks him for more insider information. Feeling used but still unable to stop himself, he gives in and, with Jake's help, they are able to make millions. Months later, Effy moves with the now very frail Naomi into a new, lavishly furnished but completely soulless flat in Canary Wharf, which Naomi does not feel at all comfortable in. Soon after, Effy receives a call from the Financial Services Authority (which was replaced by the Financial Conduct Authority shortly after filming began), who have opened an investigation on her for suspected market abuse. Jake advises her to deny everything and not cooperate. That night, Effy returns to the flat to find that Naomi's condition has severely deteriorated, and needing someone physically able to carry her, calls Dominic. The next day, while Dominic takes Naomi to the hospital, Effy goes to the FSA for her scheduled meeting, where she discovers that the FSA agent investigating her is Victoria. With Effy refusing to co-operate, Victoria decides to call in Dominic. Worried, Effy goes to the hospital to warn him, and after an angry encounter, he storms off. Effy finds Naomi having a cigarette on the roof, and she tearfully explains that she's now moving into palliative care, and she will have to face Emily. That night, Dominic turns up at her flat and confronts Effy, revealing that the FSA has confiscated his laptop. In attempt to mollify him, Effy kisses him, and the two begin to initiate sex. However, Dominic sees that she is not genuinely willing and leaves, mortified.

The next day, Effy is suspended from her company, discovering that Jake intends to throw her under the bus. She then has to collect a grieving and furious Emily from the airport. Deciding to do the right thing, Effy meets with Victoria, who sympathetically offers her a deal to cooperate with the investigation and testify against Jake, in return for a reduced prison sentence and legal protection for Dominic. Before going through with it, Effy drops by the hospital to say goodbye to Naomi, and persuades Emily to forgive her so they can spend her final days in peace. Effy then proceeds to the FSA's offices and signs her statement. Effy then leaves the FSA offices and is taken into custody, smiling enigmatically to herself as the episode ends.

== Reception ==
"Skins Fire" received mixed reviews, with Caroline Preece from Den of Geek noting that the two-parter became progressively more bleak as it went on. Writing of the first part, Adrian Michaels of The Daily Telegraph stated: "The fact that all the plot progression was extremely predictable, and that only the characters of Effy and her flatmate Naomi (Lily Loveless) were more than, er, skin-deep, would surely have sunk most drama. But happily it did not. Skins was a triumph of slick over substance."Reflecting on the end of the series. Kathryn Prescott, who played Emily Fitch, said to the BBC in an interview that the show's ending was in the right time and that it is hard to shock viewers after a long run and ending it as such would be best rather than overdoing it.
