= Ben Schiffer =

British television screenwriter and playwright

- Born: 12 July 1983 (age 43); Amsterdam, The Netherlands
- Education: Trinity College Dublin
- Occupations: Television screenwriter, playwright
- Spouse: Emily Taaffe (m. 2016)

Ben Schiffer (born 12 July 1983) is a British television screenwriter and playwright.

== Early life and education ==
Schiffer was born in Amsterdam, the Netherlands, the second son of Jewish American emigrants. He moved to London at the age of two. He attended University College School before moving to Dublin, Ireland to read English and History at Trinity College Dublin, graduating with a First-Class Honours B.A. in 2006. His first commission, whilst still at University, was the short film Hot Or Not, broadcast on BBC One in 2006.

== Career ==
=== Theatre ===
Schiffer wrote his first play, Paper Tigers, whilst still at university; the play ran to sell-out crowds at the Edinburgh Fringe. His recent theatre work includes His Ghostly Heart and 50 Ways To Leave Your Lover, both commissioned by and performed at The Bush Theatre as well as at the Edinburgh Fringe Festival. Ben has been on the Royal Court Theatre's Young Writers Scheme and has had his previous plays performed in London, Dublin, Edinburgh and the Latitude Festival.

=== Television ===
Schiffer wrote episodes of Brief Encounters and Spooks: Code 9 in 2006 and 2008, respectively. He then would work on the UK teen drama Skins, writing a total of five episodes for the first four series, as well as contributing a story for the episode Abbud in 2011. In 2013, he wrote and co-executive produced Dates, created by Skins creator Bryan Elsley for Channel 4. He wrote a pilot, Goths, with Jack Thorne, for Shine Media. His previous comedy pilot Not Safe For Work won an RTS Student Award in 2010. He would contribute episodes to Stan Lee's Lucky Man, Netflix's Young Wallander, Sky's Intergalactic and Ransom, on which he also served as co-producer.

Most recently, he served as the Creator and Showrunner of The Turkish Detective, an adaptation of Barbara Nadel's 'DI Ikmen' novels for Paramount+.

=== Film ===
He was cited as one of Screen International's Stars of Tomorrow in 2009 and his screenplay Cheerleaders 3D came second in the 2010 Brit List with 8 Votes.

== Personal life ==
Schiffer married Irish actress Emily Taaffe in 2016. The couple have a son.
