= Jess Brittain =

British television writer

Jess Brittain (born 1989/90) is a British television writer. She is best known as a writer for the Channel 4 TV series Skins, and for creating, producing and writing the television thriller series Clique, streamed on BBC Three.

== Biography ==
Brittain is the daughter of Scottish TV writer and Skins co-creator Bryan Elsley.

After her teenage years in Bristol, Brittain studied English literature at the University of Edinburgh. Her first professional experience was writing scripts for the Channel 4 television series Skins, for which she had initially given some informal contributions as a teenager. She also wrote the spin off novel Skins: Summer Holiday.

Subsequently, she created and wrote for the BBC Three thriller Clique.

== Filmography ==
- Skins (2007–2013) – writer (2011–2013)
- Clique (2016–2018) – creator, writer, associate producer (series 1), executive producer (series 2).
- Eden (2021) – co-writer (episode 2)
- The Essex Serpent (2022) – writer (episode 3)
- War (2026) – writer (episode 4)

== Bibliography ==
- Skins: Summer Holiday (2011) London: Hodder Children's.
