= Effy Stonem =

Fictional character from Skins

- Skins character
- Kaya Scodelario as Effy Stonem
- First appearance: "Tony" (episode 1.01)
- Last appearance: "Skins Fire" (episode 7.02)
- Created by: Bryan Elsley and Jamie Brittain
- Portrayed by: Kaya Scodelario
- Seasons: 1–4, 7
- Centric episode(s): "Effy" (episode 1.08) "Effy" (episode 2.07) "Effy" (episode 3.08) "Finale" (episode 3.10) "Effy" (episode 4.07) "Fire" (episode 7.01) "Fire" (episode 7.02)
- Age: 14–15 in series 1 and 2; 16–18 in series 3 and 4; 21 in series 7

In-universe information
- Occupation: Student (Series 1–4); Receptionist (Series 7); Stock trader (Series 7)
- Family: Jim (father); Anthea (mother); Tony (older brother); David (grandfather)
- Significant others: Freddie McClair; James Cook
- Nationality: British

Elizabeth "Effy" Stonem is a fictional character in the television series Skins, played by Kaya Scodelario. She appears in all of the first four series, as well as the seventh series, and appears in the most episodes (27). Kaya Scodelario was included in Entertainment Weekly's 2009 "Summer Must List", being named "Bad Girl" for her portrayal of Effy. She was included in AfterEllen.com's Top 50 Favorite Female TV Characters.

== Character history ==
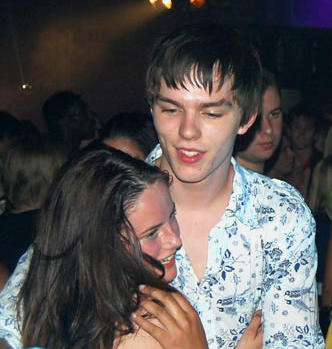
Scodelario and Nicholas Hoult, Skins party 2007

Effy was born on June 20, 1992, to parents Anthea (Morwenna Banks) and Jim Stonem (Harry Enfield).

=== Series 1 ===
In "Tony", Effy is seen walking home at the beginning of the episode, apparently from partying the night before. Her brother Tony distracts their father so that she can sneak back into the house.

In "Effy", she sneaks out of the house after pretending she is going to bed. She meets up with her friend Julie and a boy named Spencer (Tom Payne), who she shares an ecstasy tablet with. The group is caught by the police and arrested, but when Tony comes to bail Effy out of jail, he is told that someone pretending to be her brother already did so. Eventually, Spencer leads Effy to a party, where Josh Stock injects her with stolen clean pharmaceuticals. When Effy overdoses, Josh tells Tony that he will only let him take her to the hospital if Tony has sex with his unconscious sister, which Josh demands in revenge for Tony scheming against his relationship with Michelle. After Tony begs for forgiveness, Josh lets them go, and Tony rushes to the hospital with Effy and Sid Jenkins, where they are told Effy will be fine.

In the series finale, it is revealed that Effy's parents have moved her to the local private school after the overdose. She derides Tony verbally for his treatment of his ex-girlfriend Michelle Richardson, who had talked to Effy previously in an attempt to understand Tony. She witnesses Tony get hit by a bus, screams in horror, and begins crying silently.

=== Series 2 ===
In the sixth episode "Tony", she comforts Tony from his nightmares by reading him Greek mythology.

In her central episode "Effy", Effy and Tony's father Jim is on a business trip in France while their mother Anthea stays at home each day, depressed and taking Tony's medication. Effy takes care of the family. At school, Effy's art teacher tasks her with helping the new girl Pandora, and explains that she must do well on her GCSE Art coursework or else she will be expelled. She eventually befriends Pandora, and rejects the advances of a boy named Jake. Effy and Sid agree that in exchange for him doing her GCSE Art coursework, she will help Sid mend his relationship with Cassie Ainsworth, as well as that of Tony and Michelle.

Effy and Pandora pick up weed from Cassie and takes them to a club, where she sells the drugs and, supposedly, Michelle's watch, which angers Tony. Effy reveals she did not sell it, but instead had it repaired and sent back to Michelle with the word "forever" engraved in it, which prompts Michelle to speak to Tony again. Effy sends Jake to Cassie, and takes pictures of them being intimate. She drops the pictures for Sid, prompting him to finally confront Cassie, and the two make up. Effy takes pity on Pandora and gives her the pictures Sid painted. At the end of the episode, Jim arrives home to a clean house, with Anthea in a relaxed state, presumably due to Effy.

=== Series 3 ===
In the first episode of the series, Effy catches the eye of best friends Freddie, Cook and JJ on her first day at Roundview College. When Freddie attempts to romance Effy, she warns him that his friends also want to be with her. At his insistence, she dares the three boys to do activities such as sniffing glue, smoking weed, arson, porn, and sex in school, to compete for her affection. Cook completes most of Effy's challenge; Effy excuses herself from class, prompting Cook to follow, and the two have sex in the school nurse's office.

In "Cook", Effy gets to know her new classmates better while celebrating Cook's birthday. In "Thomas", her suspicion that her mother is having an affair is confirmed when she catches her with her father's boss. In "Pandora", her father leaves her and her mother. Effy becomes drunk and high at Pandora's girls-only pajama party, despite Pandora's earlier rules that drinking, drugs, and boys would not be tolerated. When Effy returns the next morning, presumably to apologise or comfort Pandora for her actions, she discovers that Pandora and Cook slept together. When Effy confronts her, Pandora resists and argues back.

In "Freddie", Effy rebuffs Freddie's flirtatious comments by claiming that she would break his heart. Later, Freddie expresses his feelings to her in greater depth and the two share a passionate kiss; however, Effy returns to Cook. In "Naomi", although there is tension between Effy and Freddie, she and Pandora are on better terms with one another. In "JJ", JJ, encouraged by Emily, angrily confronts Effy for her part in destroying the once-strong friendship he, Freddie and Cook shared. Effy is apologetic and, although she cannot guarantee that she will stop, she expresses sentiment that she would like to become his friend after he admits that he loves her too, and is somewhat hurt when he refuses. Naomi later points out that Effy is in love with Freddie, although Effy denies it.

In her central episode it is apparent that Effy has "gone off the rails". Though she is prepared to break up with Cook, which she does without informing him, and confront Freddie with her feelings, she is discouraged by Freddie's new relationship with Katie. When the group goes camping in an area of the woods known as Gobblers End, the uninvited Cook shows up and bitterly reveals secrets, including that he and Pandora have apparently been sleeping together behind Effy's back. Under the influence of shrooms, Effy flees from the clearing where they are camping and into the woods where she is attacked by a jealous and insecure Katie, who pins her down and spits on her before attempting to choke her, prompting Effy to pick up a rock and strike Katie in self-defense. Afterwards, Effy is comforted when she and Freddie have sex for the first time. The next morning, Katie is still missing, and Effy becomes anxious. Katie is eventually found and is taken to the hospital, where Freddie and others learn what happened and turn against Effy for abandoning Katie in the woods and assaulting her. Effy blacks out and awakens in a car driven by Cook.

It is learned in the finale that Cook has been bringing Effy to "one small, shitty town after another" for weeks, and Effy is becoming gradually more dissatisfied with this seemingly aimless wandering. Cook, however, tells her that this is the town where his father lives. While Cook is content to end their journey here, Effy grows worried for Cook when she sees how his father manipulates him, prompting her to call Freddie for help — and telling him that she loves him shortly before hanging up. When Freddie and JJ arrive, they decide that the fate of the boys' relationships with Effy should be decided by the small town's race. JJ, who wins the race, takes charge and demands that they solve their problems once and for all, forcing both boys to admit that they each love Effy and telling her that she must choose between them. Although Effy doesn't say anything, her "look says it all" when her gaze lingers over Freddie, prompting Cook to leave in a fury. When Freddie and Effy are alone, they make up and have sex. The following morning Effy, Freddie, Cook, and JJ begin their journey home.

=== Series 4 ===
Over the summer, Effy goes with her mother to Italy, breaking up with Freddie due to the guilt she feels from the pain she caused Katie and Cook and does not contact anyone. In "Thomas", Effy does not come to the first day of school and the others assume she is still in Italy. It is revealed at the end of the first episode that she is actually back in England, and that she is with Pandora at her house comforting her after Thomas shows up, who tried to get back with her after having cheated on her.

In "Emily", Effy returns to college, sits next to Freddie and reveals that it's him she was thinking about all summer. She then hugs Cook while Freddie watches. Later at a party, Effy is dancing with Freddie and kisses him. Cook sees this and lashes out at fellow party-goer Shankey and headbutts JJ without realizing who he has hurt. Effy and Freddie see him fighting and leave.

In the following episode "Cook", Effy and Freddie kiss again and are overseen by Cook, who has become expelled and eventually arrested when admitting to selling drugs that led to a suicide. Effy comes to see Cook in prison and tells him she loves Freddie. She admits that love is a "headfuck", but that she is enjoying it nevertheless, which Cook seems to understand.

In Freddie's episode, Effy's mother has gone on an extended vacation, leaving Effy all alone. Thus Freddie and Effy stay there, doing drugs, heavy partying and having sex. Eventually, Effy begins acting erratically, cutting out pictures of death and pasting them to her mother's bedroom wall while mentioning "creatures" coming for her. She decides to throw a "goodbye party", thus freaking much of the gang out. Freddie knocks on Effy's door three times and shakes the doorknob before she finally lets him in. When Freddie enters, he sees her hiding under the bed, visibly shaken. She tells him that he is the only one she can trust.

After Freddie clears the party out, Cook remains. However, when seeing him, Effy begins to freak out, yelling at him to leave and at Freddie to make him. Freddie starts to think that Effy is developing psychosis as well as manic episodes; something his mother also dealt with. He asks his grandfather for advice and attempts to help her. When he takes Effy to a calm field, she says that the creatures are coming for her and that she used to be stronger (thus able to fight them off) but being with Freddie had made her susceptible and "weak" to them. She sees a group of people walking toward them and freaks out, believing them to be the monsters she spoke to Freddie about. Freddie scares them off. At her insistence, Freddie drives Effy home where he sees her mother talking to a police officer. Not wanting to give up on Effy yet, Freddie turns around and begins to take Effy somewhere else.

On the way, they run into the Judgment Day parade. The number of people in demonic looking costumes begins to freak Effy out. She blames Freddie and runs away. Freddie tries to follow with the help of Cook, but loses sight of her. Katie, who is dancing on a float, sees a distraught Effy and rescues her, and calls Freddie over to take care of her. Freddie and Katie take her to visit his grandfather.

While Freddie talks to his grandfather, Katie and Effy wait in the hall. Shortly, Katie enters the room, anxious because Effy won't come out of the bathroom. Freddie, distraught once he realises Effy's been left alone, runs the bathroom she went to. Kicking the door open, he sees Effy lying on the floor unconscious with her wrists slashed. She is taken to hospital to be treated. In the hospital, Effy tells Freddie to go away. Later, Freddie talks to Effy's mother Anthea. She says that Effy needs both of them now. Freddie replies that she is going to have to take care of Effy alone, and runs off. He then goes back to Effy's home, rips all of her "death" pictures off the wall, and burns them in a bonfire outside. Cook shows up and tells Freddie not to give up on Effy.

Since Effy's suicide attempt, she has been admitted to a psychiatric hospital, under the supervision and counselling of her psychiatrist John T. Foster. As she is permitted to leave, albeit with conditions from John, she decides to visit Freddie, in which she confirms she only has love for him, and "that is all". However, at a celebration party where all the other characters are celebrating their A levels, Effy suddenly states that she is finished and is saying goodbye to everyone - including Freddie.

Over the course of the episode Effy's condition deteriorates to the point where she completely forgets who she is, and who her friends are, transforming her into a whole new person. Cook notices this and after a brief chasing scene Effy demands to be taken back to Freddie. As Cook does so he notices a duffel bag; hinting towards Freddie's near escape, the two talk and Cook leaves implying he is finished with chasing Effy. Effy is once again institutionalised, although refusing to go back under the supervision of John as it is apparent he has been using hypnotic methods to cause her to forget everything about her past and life. After a brief scuffle with Freddie, John exits hastily, and Effy states that Freddie deserves better than her. Freddie dismisses her comment and she falls asleep holding Freddie's hand and telling him she loves him over and over.

The next morning John invites Freddie to his home where Freddie once again demands that John leave Effy alone. When Freddie tries to leave, the door is locked and John, brandishing a baseball bat, reveals that he wants Effy for himself, explaining "she really does love you, you know." Freddie is heard trying to reason with John, who begins to beat him mercilessly. After a few more yells and blood splatting onto the window the counsellor continues beating the now silent Freddie.

In the finale episode of series 4 we see Effy in hospital and recovering well once more. She is concerned over Freddie's sudden departure and believes that her condition scared him off. After she's seen in hospital with Pandora and Katie, Cook finds her, now out of hospital, in Freddie's shed. She shares her concerns and her feeling of rejection with him. He gives her Freddie's notebook in which Freddie declares his love for her on every page. The episode ends with her being comforted in the knowledge of Freddie's feelings for her and celebrating his birthday with all the gang in his shed.

=== Series 7 ===
In the two-part episode "Fire", set three years after the ending of Series 4, Effy, now 21, is living in London with Naomi, with whom she now has a close relationship, and working a dead-end job as a receptionist in a high-profile hedge fund. In the years since her last appearance, she has become more mature, principled and assertive. Effy eventually becomes a stock trader with some help of her friend, Dominic (Craig Roberts), who claims to be in love with her. After achieving success through illicit information provided to her by Dominic, she pursues a relationship with Jake (Kayvan Novak), her wealthy boss, and begins to live the high life. Unfortunately, this is short-lived when the Financial Services Authority receives a tip-off and evidence that her success was the result of insider trading, and Jake places the blame squarely with her (although he had actually encouraged her to do it). To make matters worse, her personal life is shattered when Naomi is diagnosed with terminal cancer, and Effy finds herself having to deal with both the possibility of going to prison and the pain of losing Naomi. Effy manages to get Emily back to London to ensure that Naomi's last days will be spent with her beloved girlfriend at her side. After some sympathy from Victoria (Jake's ex-girlfriend and the FSA agent investigating Effy), Effy agrees to sign a confession which will name Jake and reduce her own prison sentence. Effy's story ends with her being placed into a police car to be taken into custody, her trademark wry smile crossing her face.

== Cultural impact ==
An example of Effy's look consisting of various necklaces, chunky bracelets, and a blue-grey tattered dress with pink fishnet leggings, resembling the indie sleaze fashion style

Effy Stonem as a character is often referred to as a "It girl" of the late 2000s–2010s. In having this role, she has gained a cult-like following based on her outfits and her hedonist view on life. Even if as a negative influence on watchers, she is "[how] teenage girls feel, not how they actually are." Ann Harper Covington of Strike Magazine explains: "Effy’s character became the embodiment of something many teens related to at the time: an adolescent battling a mental disorder and not always using the best tools to do it." She was able to drastically influence the resurgence of the grunge style to the mainstream. The gritty and 'broken' aesthetic that she has would make waves on social media platforms such as Tumblr in the 2010s, specifically 2014. Her style has also been connected to the indie sleaze movement of the late 2000s. On TikTok several of her melancholic phrases gained audio popularity in the 2020s.

Her character is commonly paired with Cassie Ainsworth (Hannah Murray) for both being 'miserable teenage girls' and looked up to for their rash decisions and mental illness of which the show romanticises, this trope has made them the most popular characters to come out the show. They later ended up both making appearances in the separately focused episodes Skins: Fire and Skins: Pure.
