= Merveille Lukeba =

Congolese-British actor

- Born: 30 March 1990 (age 36); Kinshasa, Zaire
- Occupation: Actor
- Years active: 2006–present

Merveille Lukeba (born 30 March 1990) is a Congo-born British actor, best known for his role as Thomas Tomone in double BAFTA-winning E4 teen drama Skins.

== Early life ==
Born in Kinshasa, Zaire, he was raised in Woolwich, southeast London.

He can speak fluent French and Lingala.

== Career ==
He played the role of Thomas, a Congolese immigrant to England, in series 3 and 4 of the UK teen drama Skins.

== Filmography ==
Year	Film	Role	Notes
2006	Ezra	Moses	Feature film
2007	The Bill	Tre Douglas	TV series
2009–2010	Skins	Thomas Tomone	Main cast member, Series 3 & 4
2009	10 Minute Tales - Perfect Day	The Boy	Short-Film
2010	Bloody Foreigners	John Hackett	Season 1, episode 1
2012	Lewis	Kyle Hutchinson	TV Drama
