= Kathryn Prescott =

English actress

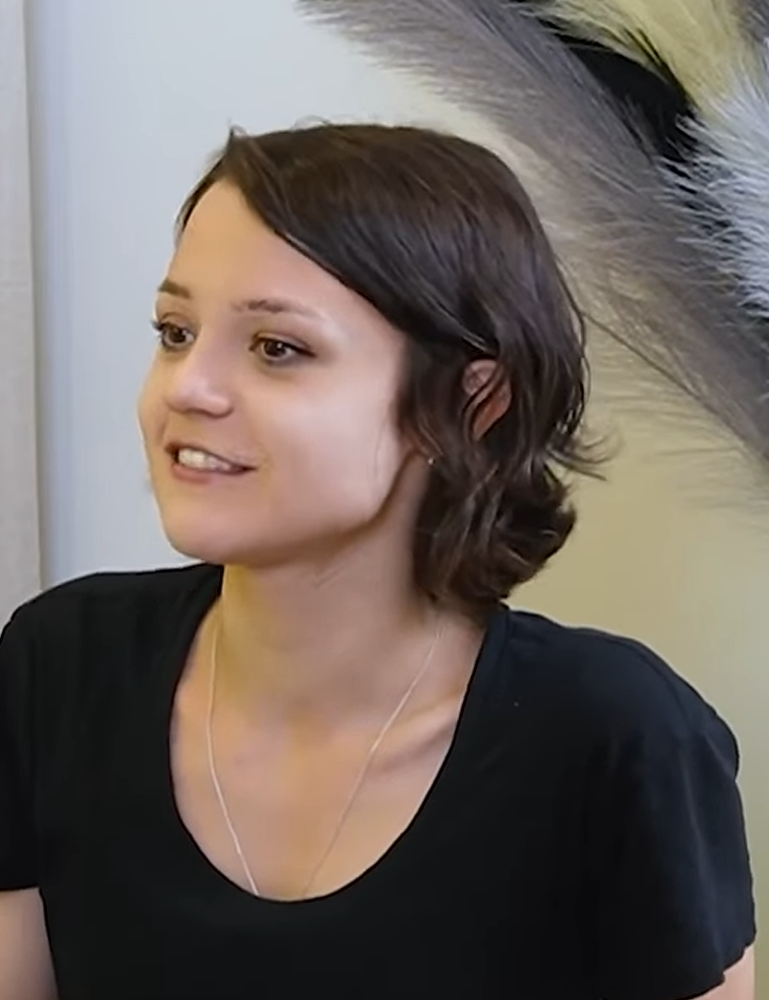
- Prescott on the Gabriella Rebranded podcast, 2025
- Born: 4 June 1991 (age 35); Palmers Green, London, England
- Occupation: Actress
- Years active: 2008–present
- Relatives: Megan Prescott (twin sister)

Kathryn Prescott (born 4 June 1991) is an English actress, best known for her role as Emily Fitch in the UK teen drama series Skins. She also played the titular character in the MTV teen drama Finding Carter (2014–2015).

== Early life ==
Prescott was born in Palmers Green, London. She is six minutes older than her twin sister, Megan, and also has a younger brother, Ben Prescott.

== Career ==
Prescott made her professional acting debut alongside sister Megan in the episode of soap opera Doctors, "Dare, Double Dare, Truth". From 2009–2010, Prescott played Emily Fitch in series three and four of British teen drama Skins, returning for the two-part special Skins: Fire as part of the show's seventh and final series in 2013.

In 2014, she played the title character on the MTV drama series Finding Carter, about a kidnapped child who is reunited with her parents over a decade later. Despite critical acclaim, it was cancelled after its second season. Prescott later appeared in the Netflix films To the Bone (2017) and Dude (2018). In 2019, she appeared in A Dog's Journey as CJ and had the lead role of Bird, a high school outcast who is unknowingly gifted a haunted camera, in the supernatural horror film Polaroid. In 2022, Prescott guest-starred in the fifth series of the medical drama New Amsterdam as Vanessa Bloom, a recovering drug addict. It marked her first role in a year since her accident in September 2021.

== Personal life ==
On 7 September 2021, Prescott was run over by a cement truck while crossing the street in Brooklyn. In a November 2025 episode of the podcast Gabriella Rebranded, Prescott revealed the extent of her injuries, which included breaking her pelvis in four places; snapping her left femur in half (which dissected her femoral artery, requiring urgent surgery); and breaking her right foot, among smaller breaks and abrasions. She also detailed suffering post-traumatic stress disorder in the months and years following the accident.

== Filmography ==
=== Film ===
Year	Title	Role	Notes
2013	Vargulf	Grace	Short film
2014	Insoma	Homeless Girl	Short film
2014	Dregs	Zoe	Short film
2014	Counting Backwards	Kelly	Short film
2014	The Hive	Katie	
2015	Skeletons	Holly Morgan	Short film
2017	Fun Mom Dinner	Zoe	
2017	To the Bone	Anna	
2018	Dear You	—N/a	Short film; also director, writer and executive producer
2018	Dude	Chloe Daniels	
2018	Formaldehyde	Erin	Short film
2019	A Dog's Journey	Clarity June "C.J." Mitchell-Montgomery	
2019	Polaroid	Bird Fitcher	
2019	Jane	—N/a	Short film; also director, writer and executive producer
2021	Ella	Jules	Short film
2022	Gina	—N/a	Short film; also director

=== Television ===
Year	Title	Role	Notes
2008	Doctors	Amy Wilcox	Episode: "Dare, Double Dare, Truth"
2009–2010	Skins	Emily Fitch	Main role (seasons 3–4); 16 episodes
2013	Skins	Emily Fitch	Guest role (season 7); 2 episodes
2011	Monroe	Jennifer	Episode #1.04
2012	Casualty	Ruby Beale	Episode: "Duty of Care"
2012	Bedlam	Cass	Episode: "Pool of Tears"
2013	Being Human	Natasha	Episode: "No Care, All Responsibility"
2014	Reign	Penelope	Recurring role; 4 episodes
2014–2015	Finding Carter	Carter Stevens / Lyndon Wilson	Lead role; 36 episodes
2015	The Dovekeepers	Aziza	Guest role; 2 episodes
2017	24: Legacy	Amira Dudayev	Recurring role; 6 episodes
2017–2019	The Son	Young Ingrid	Recurring role
2019	Robot Chicken	Various	Voice role; episode: "Hermie Nursery in: Seafood Sensation"
2019	Tell Me a Story	Susie	Recurring role
2021	The Rookie	Linda Charles / Katerina Antonov	Episode: "Red Hot"
2022	Fleishman Is in Trouble	Woman	Television miniseries; Episode: "Summon Your Witnesses"; uncredited
2022–2023	New Amsterdam	Vanessa Bloom	Recurring role; 8 episodes

=== Music videos ===
Year	Title	Artist	Role
2013	"Love Bites"	The Midnight Beast	Zombie Girlfriend

=== Video games ===
Year	Title	Role	Notes
2020	Dota Underlords	Anessix	Voice role
