= Lily Loveless =

English actress (born 1990)

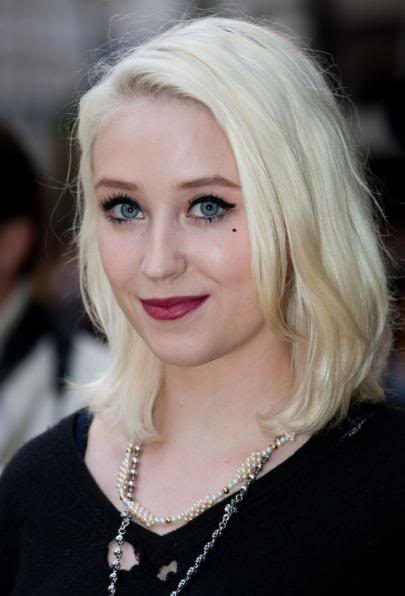
- Loveless in 2013
- Born: Lily May Loveless; 16 April 1990 (age 36); London, England
- Occupation: Actress
- Years active: 2008–present

Lily May Loveless (born 16 April 1990) is an English actress, best known for her role as Naomi in the BAFTA award-winning drama Skins.

== Career ==
Loveless made her acting debut in the third series of Skins, playing the sexually confused, outspoken political activist teenager Naomi Campbell.

She was a performer in Psychotic Dance Company, a dance group that specialises in street dance fused with other urban dance styles. Loveless received the 2007 Jack Petchey Achievement Award. In June 2007, she performed with the Psychotic Dance Company at the Tottenham Carnival.

In 2010, she played the character of Chloe in the adaptation of Mark Billingham's Sleepyhead. Following this, Loveless secured many roles, including Anna in The Fades, penned by former Skins writer Jack Thorne (playing the role in both the pilot and the following series); Sadie in Sky Living's supernatural drama Bedlam, alongside Theo James, Charlotte Salt and former Skins co-stars Will Young and Hugo Speer; Bex in BBC children's drama Combat Kids; and an appearance as a homeless teenage runaway, Ellie, in the final series of The Sarah Jane Adventures. She ended 2011 making her film debut in Nirpal Bhogal's Sket playing the part of Hannah. After its premiere at the London Film Festival, the film was released nationwide on 28 October 2011. She followed this with a guest appearance in the BBC drama Good Cop, written by Stephen Butchard, and a role in Nihat Seven's independent film drama Candle to Water.

Outside film and television, Loveless appeared alongside actor Matthew Lewis in the promo video for A Band of Buriers' 'Filth' directed by Blake Claridge.

On 16 October 2012, it was confirmed that Loveless would reprise the role of Naomi Campbell in the seventh and final series of Skins.

In 2013, Loveless was awarded Best Newcomer at the Monaco International Film Festival for her portrayal as Alexia in Kate Lane's Fear of Water.

August 2016 saw Loveless's debut on the London stage, starring in The Collector at The Vaults theatre with Daniel Portman. Although the play itself received mixed reviews, Loveless's performance received positive reviews.

In 2019, Loveless played Ingrid Prisby in Netflix mystery thriller The Stranger.

== Filmography ==
Year	Production	Character	Notes
2009–2010; 2013	Skins	Naomi Campbell	Series 3–4; Series 7, Episodes 1–2, "Fire"
2009	Seven PM	Fox	Film (short)
2010	Thorne: Sleepyhead	Chloe	TV Drama
2010	The Fades	Anna Roberts	TV Drama (pilot)
2010	Hit and Run	Shelley	Film (short)
2010	Combat Kids	Bex Clayton	TV series
2011	Bedlam	Sadie Novak	Series 1, episode 3; "Inmates"
2011	Sket	Hannah	Film
2011	The Fades	Anna Roberts	TV series
2011	The Sarah Jane Adventures	Ellie Faber	Series 5, Episodes 3–4; "The Curse of Clyde Langer"
2012	Wallander	Margaretha Harkala	Series 3, episode 2; "Before the Frost"
2012	Good Cop	Lucy	Series 1, episode 4
2012	Candle to Water	Chrissie	Film
2013	The Crash	Ashley Wainwright	TV Drama
2013	Fear of Water	Alexia	Film
2013	Mugged	Ros	Film (short)
2014	Dead in the Water	Nicole	Radio play
2014	DCI Banks	Tracy Banks	Series 3, Episodes 4-6
2014	The Great War: The People's Story	Dorothy Lloyd	TV series
2015	Set the Thames on Fire	Emily	Film
2015	Cuffs	Cinnamon	TV series, episode 1
2016	The Musketeers	Elodie	BBC TV Series, season 3, episode 7, "Fools Gold", episode 10, "The Garrison"
2018	The Royals	Greta	TV series Season 4
2018	We the Kings	Lucy	Film
2020	The Stranger	Ingrid Prisby	TV series
2021	Cost of Living	Lily	Short film

Music videos
Year	Song	Artist	Role	Notes
2012	"Filth"	A Band of Buriers	Girlfriend	
2016	"Kicks"	Lauren Aquilina	Boxer	

== Theatre ==
Year	Production	Character	Theatre
2016	The Collector	Miranda Grey	The Vaults - London

== Personal life ==
Loveless attended Millfields Community Primary School and Cardinal Pole Roman Catholic School, both in Hackney, East London. She also said that she likes music from artists such as Florence and the Machine because it is theatrical and when she listens to music she pictures scenes in films that the music could relate to. She also plays the piano. Loveless lives with former Skins costar Megan Prescott.
