= Bryan Elsley =

Scottish television writer

- Born: 17 May 1961 (age 64); Dalkeith, Midlothian, Scotland
- Occupation: Television writer
- Children: Jamie Brittain; Jess Brittain; Edith Elsley; Nommie Elsley

Bryan Elsley (born 17 May 1961 in Dalkeith, Midlothian) is a Scottish television writer, best known for the co-creation of E4 teen drama Skins with his son, Jamie Brittain. Other television dramas include Rose and Maloney, The Young Person's Guide to Becoming a Rock Star, The Crow Road, Dates, and Kiss Me First.

== Early life and education ==
Elsley attended Dalkeith High School before going on to read English and History at the Alcuin College, University of York in York, England, where he graduated with a B.A. in 1982.

== Career ==
While a student at the University of York, Elsley met and collaborated with Harry Enfield. They created a comedy duo, "Dusty and Dick", and performed a sell out show at the Edinburgh Festival Fringe.

Elsley took up a career in theatrical writing, and then pursued television writing after parting from Enfield. For three years, Elsley was artistic director of Pocket Theatre Cumbria, which was based at Kendal's Brewery Arts Centre. At that time he was living at Staveley, near Kendal, and also writing episodes for the TV series Casualty and London's Burning. These, along with his short film Govan Ghost Story (1989), opened up opportunities for other television writing. Elsley's big break came when he was commissioned by the BBC to adapt Iain Banks's novel The Crow Road for television.

On 18 March 2010, Elsey announced via the Skins blog that the final episode of series 4 was his last as a writer for the UK series, although Elsley did return to write the opening episode for series 6 in 2012. He executive produced Skins U.S. in 2011.

His series Counsels about a group of young lawyers in Scotland was commissioned by the BBC in 2025, with filming taking place that year in Glasgow.

== Personal life ==
Elsley has five children and currently lives in Kentish Town, London.

== Film and television work ==
- The Crow Road (1996)
- The Young Person's Guide to Becoming a Rock Star (1998)
- Complicity (2000)
- Rose and Maloney (2002–2005)
- Skins (2007–2013)
- Skins U.S. (2011)
- Dates (2013)
- Clique (2016)
- Kiss Me First (2018)
