= Jamie Brittain =

British television writer

- Born: 14 August 1985 (age 39); Edinburgh, Scotland
- Occupation(s): Television writer and actor
- Parent: Bryan Elsley

Jamie Brittain (born 14 August 1985 in Edinburgh, Scotland) is a Scottish television writer and actor. Along with his father, Bryan Elsley, he co-created the E4 teen drama Skins. On 1 April 2011, Brittain announced that he would be leaving the show, but he returned for the final seventh series.

He was an adviser and writer on the TV series Kiss Me First on Channel 4 television.
