= List of Tom Baker performances and credits =

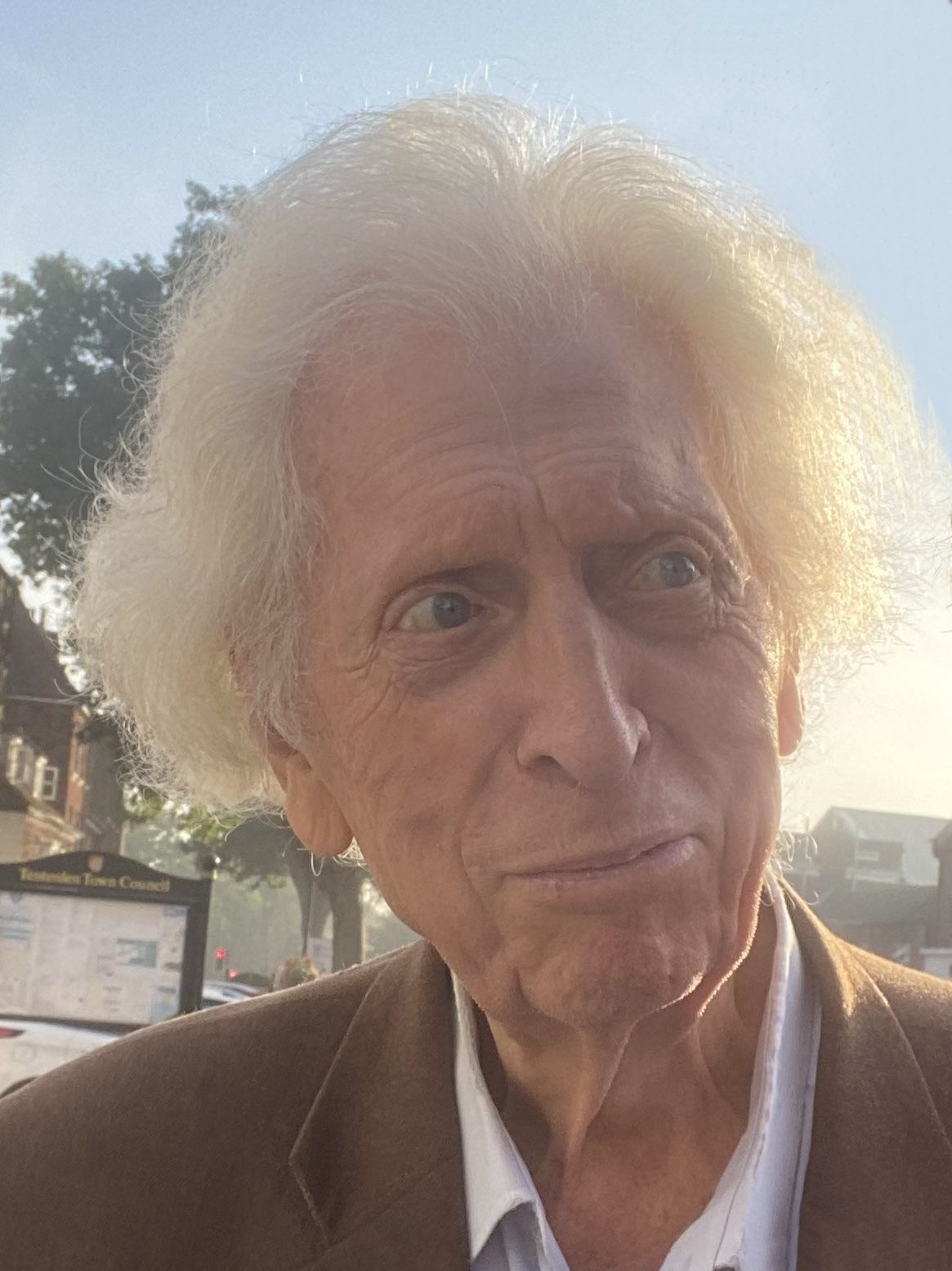
Baker in 2023

Tom Baker is an English actor with a prolific career across stage, film, television and radio. His professional acting debut was as the bear in The Winter’s Tale in 1966. His film debut came the following year in that play's film adaptation. Baker joined the National Theatre company in 1968, appearing in stage productions such as The Travails of Sancho Panza, The Merchant of Venice, The National Health and A Woman Killed with Kindness. His National Theatre contract ended in 1971.

His first major film role was as Grigori Rasputin in Nicholas and Alexandra (1971), for which he was nominated for two Golden Globe Awards: Best Supporting Actor – Motion Picture and Most Promising Newcomer. He appeared in the BBC’s 1972 Play of the Month production of The Millionairess. He continued to work in theatre, with a role in The Novelist at Hampstead and as the lead in Macbeth at the Shaw Theatre, London.

Baker took supporting parts in fantasy genre films, such as The Canterbury Tales (1972), The Vault of Horror (1973), Frankenstein: The True Story (1973), The Golden Voyage of Sinbad (1973) and The Mutations (1974). His film career stagnated when three film projects collapsed due to lack of funding, and he started working part-time on a building site. His performance in The Golden Voyage of Sinbad impressed producer Barry Letts, who cast Baker in February 1974 as the fourth incarnation of the Doctor in the science fiction series Doctor Who (1974–1981). Baker's performance is considered among the best and most popular of the many actors who played the character. He stayed with the series for seven consecutive seasons.

Baker withdrew to the theatre after leaving Doctor Who. He played Oscar Wilde on stage in Feasting with Panthers at the Chichester Festival Theatre in 1981, and the following year played Judge Brack in Hedda Gabler in the West End and Dr. Bryant in Educating Rita for the Royal Shakespeare Company. He returned to television, portraying Sherlock Holmes in the serial The Hound of the Baskervilles (1982) and Redbeard Rum in Blackadder II (1986). His first long-running role since playing the Doctor was as Dr. Hoyt in the medical drama series Medics (1992–1995). He later appeared in the series Randall & Hopkirk (Deceased) (2000–2001) and Monarch of the Glen (2004–2005).

Baker moved into voice acting in the early 2000s. He narrated the comedy series Little Britain (2003–2006, 2019) and Little Britain USA (2008). In 2006 he was voted the fourth-most recognisable voice in the United Kingdom. He had voice roles in animated programmes such as Tales of Aesop (1990), The Secret Show (2006), The Beeps (2007–2008) and Star Wars Rebels (2016). He has also provided vocals for musical artists such as alternative rock band Mansun (on the 1998 album Six) and progressive rock project Ayreon (on the 2020 album Transitus). Since 2011, Baker has regularly reprised his role as the Fourth Doctor in licensed audio dramas by Big Finish Productions.

== Film ==
Year	Title	Role	Notes	Ref(s)
1967	The Winter's Tale		Uncredited; film debut	
1971	Nicholas and Alexandra	Grigori Rasputin	Nominated for the Golden Globe for Best Supporting Actor – Motion Picture and Most Promising Newcomer	
1972	The Canterbury Tales	Jenkin		
1973	Dear Parents	Karl		
1973	The Vault of Horror	Moore		
1973	Frankenstein: The True Story	Sea captain		
1973	The Golden Voyage of Sinbad	Koura		
1974	Luther	Pope Leo X	Does not appear in some versions of the film	
1974	The Mutations	Lynch		
1980	The Curse of King Tut's Tomb	Hasan		
1983/4	The Passionate Pilgrim	Sir Tom	Short film	
1984	The Zany Adventures of Robin Hood	Sir Guy de Gisbourne		
1985	Enemy Mine	Narrator		
1989	The Wolves of Willoughby Chase	Narrator		
1998	Backtime	Sarge		
2000	Dungeons & Dragons	Halvarth		
2005	The Magic Roundabout	Zeebad	Voice; Redubbed for US release	
2006	Global Haywire	Narrator	Documentary	
2010	The Genie in the Bottle	Narrator	Short film	
2013	Break Glass in Case Of...	Monica	Voice	
2013	Saving Santa	Santa	Voice; UK dub	
2019	Wonder Park	Boomer	Voice; UK dub	

== Television ==
Year	Title	Role	Notes	Ref(s)
1968	Dixon of Dock Green	The man	Episode: "The Attack"	
1968	Market in Honey Lane	Doorman	Episode: "The Matchmakers"	
1968	George and the Dragon	Porter	Episode: "The 10:15 Train"	
1968	Z-Cars	Harry Russell	Episode: "Hudson's Way"	
1968	Dixon of Dock Green	Foreman	Episode: "Number 13"	
1969	Thirty-Minute Theatre	Corporal Schabe	Episode: "The Victims: Frontier"	
1970	Softly, Softly	Site foreman	Episode: "Like Any Other Friday"	
1972	Play of the Month	Dr. Ahmed el Kabir	Episode: "The Millionairess"	
1973	Arthur of the Britons	Brandreth / Gavron	Episode: "Go Warily"	
1974–1981	Doctor Who	Fourth Doctor	172 episodes (excluding Planet of the Spiders and Shada)	
1975	Jim'll Fix It	Fourth Doctor	1 episode	
1975	Disney Time	Fourth Doctor	1 episode	
1976	Piccadilly Circus	Mark Ambient		
1977	Nouvelles de Henry James	Mark Ambient		
1978	Late Night Story	Host	4 episodes	
1979–1981	The Book Tower	Presenter	21 episodes	
1982	The Hound of the Baskervilles	Sherlock Holmes	4 episodes (mini series)	
1983	Jemima Shore Investigates	Dr. Norman Ziegler	Episode: "Dr. Ziegler's Casebook"	
1983	Doctor Who	Fourth Doctor	Episode: "The Five Doctors" (via untransmitted archive footage from Shada)	
1984	Remington Steele	Anatole Blaylock	Episode: "Hounded Steele"	
1985	Jackanory	Storyteller	Episode: "The Iron Man"	
1986	The Life and Loves of a She-Devil	Father Ferguson	Episode 4	
1986	Redwall Friar	Hugo	(voice)	
1986	Blackadder II	Captain Redbeard Rum	Episode: "Potato"	
1986	The Kenny Everett Television Show	Patient/John Thompson/Blu-Tac/Tom	Series 4, Episode 1	
1990	The Silver Chair	Puddleglum		
1990	Tales of Aesop	Narrator		
1990	Hyperland	Tom	"Fantasy documentary" created by Douglas Adams	
1990	BOOM!	Co-presenter		
1991	Selling Hitler	Manfred Fischer	4 episodes	
1992	Cluedo	Professor Plum	6 episodes	
1992	Screen Two	Sir Lionel Sweeting	Episode: "The Law Lord"	
1992	Doctor Who: The Tom Baker Years	Presenter	Video	
1992–1995	Medics	Professor Geoffrey Hoyt	34 episodes	
1993	Doctor Who	Fourth Doctor	Charity special Dimensions in Time	
1994	The Imaginatively Titled Punt & Dennis Show	Actor in supermarket	Cameo	
1994	Equinox	Narrator	Episode: "Rave New World"	
1998	Have I Got News for You	Himself		
2000	This Is Your Life	Himself		
2000	The Canterbury Tales	Simpkin	Voice only. Episode: "The Journey Back"	
2000	Max Bear	Max Bear	Voice only	
2000–2001	Randall & Hopkirk (Deceased)	Professor Wyvern	10 episodes	
2001	Fun at the Funeral Parlour	Quimby	Episode: "The Jaws of Doom"	
2003	Swiss Toni	Derek Asquith	Episode: "Cars Don't Make You Fat"	
2003	2DTV	Fourth Doctor	Voice only. Series 4, Episode 1	
2003	Strange	Father Bernard	Episode: "Asmoth"	
2003	Fort Boyard (UK)	Captain Baker	20 episodes	
2003–2005, 2019	Little Britain	Narrator	21 episodes	
2004	The Little Reindeer	Santa Claus	Voice	
2004–2005	Monarch of the Glen	Donald MacDonald	12 episodes	
2005, 2007, 2015, 2016	Comic Relief Does Little Britain	Narrator	5 episodes	
2006	The Secret Show	Robert Baron	Voice only. Episode: "The Secret Room"	
2006	Little Britain: Abroad	Narrator	2 episodes	
2007	Agatha Christie's Marple	Frederick Treves	Episode: "Towards Zero"	
2007–2008	The Beeps	Narrator	45 episodes	
2008	Little Britain USA	Narrator	6 episodes	
2008	Have I Got News for You	Himself	Guest host	
2010	In Confidence	Himself	Series 1 Episode 5. Interviewed by Laurie Taylor	
2013	Doctor Who	The Curator	Episode: "The Day of the Doctor"	
2016–2017	Star Wars Rebels	Bendu	Voice	
2017	Doctor Who	Fourth Doctor	Shada: Voice for animation and new live action scene	
2020	The Big Night In	Narrator	Little Britain special	
2020	The Big Night In	Himself	The Doctors Say Thank You	

== Theatre ==
Year	Title	Role	Notes	Ref(s)
1966	The Winter's Tale	The Bear, Rogero, Autolycus, a gentleman, two dancers	Assembly Hall, Edinburgh; Cambridge Theatre, London; Teatro La Fenice, Venice	
1967	Shop in the High Street		Edinburgh Festival Fringe	
1967	Stand Still and Retreat Onwards		Edinburgh Festival Fringe	
1967	Apple a Day		Edinburgh Festival Fringe	
1967	Dial M for Murder		Henley-on-Thames	
1967	The Reluctant Debutante		Henley-on-Thames	
1967	Rosencrantz and Guildenstern Are Dead	T/O Extra	The Old Vic	
1968	Hay Fever		The Library Theatre, Scarborough	
1968	The Strongbox		The Library Theatre, Scarborough	
1968	Arden of Faversham		The Library Theatre, Scarborough	
1968	A Bout in the Backyard		The Library Theatre, Scarborough	
1969–70	The National Health or Nurse Norton’s Affair	Extra	The Old Vic	
1969–70	The Travails of Sancho Panza	Rozinante the horse	The Old Vic	
1970	The Merchant of Venice	Prince of Monaco	The Old Vic	
1969–70	The Merchant of Venice	Prince of Monaco	The National Theatre	
1970	The Idiot	Parfyon Rogozhin	The National Theatre	
1970–1	Mrs. Warren's Profession		The National Theatre	
1971	A Woman Killed With Kindness	Sir Francis Acton	The Old Vic	
1971	The Rules of the Game	Filippo	New Theatre and Theatre Royal	
1972	Troilus and Cressida		Bristol Old Vic	
1972	Don Juan		Bristol Old Vic	
1972	The White Devil		Bristol Old Vic	
1973	Macbeth	Macbeth, King of Scotland	Shaw Theatre	
1974	The Trials of Oscar Wilde	Oscar Wilde	Oxford Festival	
1981	Treasure Island	Long John Silver	Mermaid Theatre	
1981	Feasting with Panthers	Oscar Wilde	Chichester Festival Theatre	
1982–3	Hedda Gabler	Judge Brack	Bristol Hippodrome and Cambridge Theatre, London	
1982–3	Educating Rita	Frank	UK Tour	
1984–5	She Stoops to Conquer	Mr Hardcastle	National Theatre – Lyttelton, National Theatre	
1984–5	She Stoops to Conquer	Mr Hardcastle	Theatre Royal	
1985	The Mask of Moriarty	Sherlock Holmes/Professor Moriarty	Gate Theatre	
1987	An Inspector Calls	Inspector Goole	Westminster Theatre, London	
1988	The Musical Comedy Murders of 1940	Ken de la Maize	Greenwich Theatre, London	
1994	Arsenic and Old Lace	Jonathan Brewster	Theatre Royal, Alhambra Theatre and other locations	
2024	A Christmas Carol	Jacob Marley (prerecorded segment)	Crime and Comedy Theatre Company	

== Video games ==
Year	Title	Role	Notes	Ref(s)
1995	Little Red Riding Hood	Narrator	Voice	
1997	Destiny of the Doctors	Fourth Doctor	Voice and likeness	
2000	Ecco the Dolphin: Defender of the Future	Narrator	Voice	
2001	Hostile Waters: Antaeus Rising	Narrator	Voice	
2003	Warhammer 40,000: Fire Warrior	Narrator	Voice	
2004	Sudeki	Narrator	Voice	
2005	Heretic Kingdoms: The Inquisition	Narrator	Voice	
2005	MediEvil: Resurrection	Grim Reaper	Voice	
2006	Cold Winter	John Gray	Voice	
2007	Little Britain: The Video Game	Narrator	Voice	
2015	Lego Dimensions	Fourth Doctor	Voice; archive sound	
2015	Nelly Cootalot: The Fowl Fleet	Sebastian J. Coot	Voice	
2018	Shadows: Awakening	Krenze	Voice	

== Audio drama ==
Key
†	Denotes television productions that have not yet been released

Year	Title	Role	Notes	Ref(s)
1976	Doctor Who and the Pescatons	Fourth Doctor		
1976	Exploration Earth	Fourth Doctor	Episode: "The Time Machine"	
1992–1993	Lionel Nimrod's Inexplicable World	Lionel Nimrod		
1994	The Russia House	Barley Blair		
1994	Lost Empires	Nick Ollanton		
1995	Bomber	Narrator		
1999	Nicholas Nickleby	Vincent Crummles		
2003	Tom's Diner	Tom Plum	4 episodes	
2009	Doctor Who: Hornets' Nest	Fourth Doctor	5 episodes	
2010	Doctor Who: Demon Quest	Fourth Doctor	5 episodes	
2011	Doctor Who: Serpent Crest	Fourth Doctor	5 episodes	
2012	Hard Times	Josiah Bounderby		
2012–present	Doctor Who: The Audio Adventures	Fourth Doctor	125 episodes	
2020–2021	Doctor Who: The Audio Adventures	The Curator	3 episodes	
2013	Treasure Island	Long John Silver / Captain Flint	Produced by Big Finish Productions	
2015	Sky Adverts	Himself		
2018	The Diary of River Song	Fourth Doctor	Episode: "Someone I Once Knew"	
2019	Little Brexit	Narrator		
2026	Sir Sherlock: The Red Letter Day †	Sherlock Holmes		

== Music ==
Year	Artist	Album	Notes	Ref(s)
1982	The Conversation Foundation	Serafina - the Story of a Whale	Baker plays Adamus Plato; produced for EMI's Music for Pleasure	
1995	Technocat		Spoken vocals on the track "Only Human"	
1998	Mansun	Six	Narrator on track "Witness to a Murder (Part 2)"	
2009	Stephen James	Andabrek	Recorded monologue for the track "Megamorphosis" in 2002	
2020	Ayreon	Transitus	Baker plays the character "The Storyteller"	

== Web ==
Year	Title	Role	Notes	Ref.
2020	The Doctors Say Thank You	Himself		
