= Mini (Skins series 5) =

- Skins episode
- Episode no.: Series 5 Episode 3
- Directed by: Philippa Langdale
- Written by: Georgia Lester
- Original air date: 10 February 2011

Guest appearances
- Joann Condon as Ginny; Kelly Brook as Jemima; Clare Grogan as Shelley; Chris Addison as David Blood

Episode chronology
← Previous "Rich"	Next → "Liv"
- Skins (series 5)

"Mini" is the third episode of the fifth series of the British teen drama Skins. It first aired in the UK on E4 on 10 February 2011. It focuses on the character Mini McGuinness (Freya Mavor) as she tries to put on a charity fashion show and maintain her relationship with her boyfriend, Nick Levan (Sean Teale).

== Synopsis ==
The episode begins as Mini, weight-conscious as ever, goes to the gym, before heading to her boyfriend, Nick Levan's rugby practice. After the practice, she holds a meeting with a school committee, to discuss an upcoming charity fashion show. To her outrage, her friend, Grace has enlisted Franky as costume designer. Out of pure pride, she decides to completely rearrange it, and asks for the help of Nick. Nick reveals that he has his house to himself for a while, and they can have sex for the first time in their 3-month relationship. Mini becomes noticeably hesitant when approaching this topic, as she has not admitted that she is still a virgin to Nick. She is also afraid of having sex, due to the warnings of her single mother, Shelley, that a boy often wants a woman for just that, as happened to her.

As they make preparations, Mini makes many more attempts to put off having sex with Nick, though she realises that she cannot put it off for much longer, because Nick is unlikely to want to wait. Eventually, she and Liv double-date with Nick and his friend, Rider, at a bowling alley. Mini tries to steal the keys to Nick's house, but Rider suggests they go to his. There, he and Liv hook up and start to have sex. Mini, realising that Nick will want to do the same, first goes to the bathroom and takes some medicine, resulting in her throwing up on Nick before they can get too far. Nick and Liv take Mini home and sleep on her floor. The next morning, however, she wakes up and, upon seeing them together, immediately suspects the worst - that Liv secretly wants Nick. At school, Mini is mocked by Franky's group, and believes Liv spread the story. She attempts to call both Nick and Liv to help her with the fashion show, but finds Nick's phone in the changing room, discovering 3 missed calls from Liv earlier. Locating Liv and Nick at the amphitheatre, practising their dance, and Liv wearing Mini's dress, she immediately confronts them about their tardiness and demands she gives her her dress back. She is immediately bombarded with questions and complaints from the others, as there are not enough dresses and many are too small, and immediately passes out. She is told to return home to recuperate. Realising that she may be on the verge of losing Nick, Mini prepares to have sex with him, and returns to school to discover he and Liv are doing their dance together, using Franky and Grace's original ideas, to a standing ovation.

At the after-show party at a rave, Mini confronts Liv again, and storms off, as Grace and Rich share a brief kiss. Nick then goes to Liv and suggests he break up with Mini. The two then leave the room. As she sobs outside, Mini is approached by Franky, who explains to her the reason why she was friends with Liv and Grace, and the two reconcile. She entices her to return to the rave. There, they spot Liv and Nick leaving another room, dressing themselves, and realise they have been having sex. Mini immediately tells Franky to forget she saw this, and Franky spots Matty in the crowd. Mini then entices Nick to take her home. He agrees, and they return to Nick's place. Mini finally loses her virginity, but wakes up the next morning alone (as Nick has gone to practice.) Sadly, she returns home and sees her Mum, who is also going home after a one-night stand.
