= Little Britain: The Video Game =

2007 video game

- PS2 cover art
- Developers: Gamerholix; Gamesauce
- Publisher: Mastertronic Group
- Platforms: PlayStation 2, Microsoft Windows, PlayStation Portable
- Release: PS2 & PC: EU: 2 February 2007; PSP: EU: 21 September 2007; AU: 4 October 2007
- Genre: Party
- Mode: Single-player

Little Britain: The Video Game is a collection of mini-games by British studios Gamerholix and Gamesauce and published by Mastertronic Group under their Blast! Entertainment label. It is presented in the format of an episode from the TV series. Players can interact with the sketch show characters in a series of seven mini-games featuring Lou and Andy, Vicky Pollard, Emily and Florence, Marjorie Dawes, Daffyd Thomas, Judy & Maggie and Letty. Each mini game plays like a sketch from the TV show and to win the game, the player must progress through all the sketches to the end of the show, where the credits will roll. The game's reception was generally negative.

== Development ==
The game was announced by publisher Blast! Entertainment in November 2006. The show's creators and main cast members, Matt Lucas and David Walliams, were announced as being the voice providers for the game, with Walliams also said to be working on the game's script.

== Platforms ==
Little Britain: The Video Game is available for PC, PS2 and PSP. The PC version has a variation on the title and is called Little Britain: The Computer Game. This is the only difference between platforms. The PSP version is entirely different from the PC and PS2 versions of the game, as it allows wireless multiplayer with the PSP's WLAN function and the ability to stream demos of the game to other users. It also features a bonus mini game featuring Anne and a new game for Emily.

== Reception ==
Reception

Aggregate score
Aggregator	Score
GameRankings	PS2: 16.00% PC: 11.67%

Review scores
Publication	Score
Eurogamer	PS2: 1/10
PALGN	PS2: 1½/10

The game was universally panned on release. With a score of 16% and 11.67%, for the PS2 and PC version respectively, on GameRankings, it was the second lowest rated game on the site, surpassed only by Big Rigs: Over the Road Racing.

In his review of the PS2 version for Eurogamer, James Lyon called the game "Absolutely appalling" and that each and every one of the minigames was "awful". He went on to conclude that the game was "badly animated, graphically poor, and should shame all who made it and all who buy it." Writing in PALGN Neville Nicholson said it was "possibly the worst licensed game in the history of mankind" and that the "English language is insufficient to fully describe the atrocities this game comprises."
