= Joann Condon =

British actress

- Born: 1970 (age 55–56)
- Occupation: Actress
- Years active: 1996–present

Joann Condon (born April 1970) is a British actress who has worked in film, television, and the theatre.

== Career ==
Condon is best known for her role as Pat, a member of the Fat Fighters group in the BBC television comedy Little Britain, written by and starring David Walliams and Matt Lucas. The character left the group in the very last episode of the series. Her other television roles include the recurring characters of Sue Fingers in Edge of Heaven (2014) and Ada in The Halcyon (2017). She portrayed two characters in the long-running hospital drama Casualty, Stella Baker and Fiona Porie. Condon also made appearances on The Office and Dad's Army: The Lost Episodes.

Condon starred as the female sumo wrestler Giant Butterfly in the 2000 film Secret Society.

Condon's stage work includes the role of Gemma Sweeney in Jonathan Harvey's play Babies (Royal National Theatre / Royal Court Theatre), a work which won the George Devine Award in 1993 and the Evening Standard's Most Promising Playwright Award in 1994. In 2021 she starred in the one woman show Little Boxes, a work she also authored, at the Ludlow Fringe Festival.

== Filmography ==
=== Film ===
| Year | Title | Role | Notes |
|---|---|---|---|
| 2000 | Secret Society | Giant Butterfly | |
| 2009 | The Imaginarium of Doctor Parnassus | Shopper | |
| 2021 | The Last Letter from Your Lover | Post Office Cashier | |

=== Television ===
| Year | Title | Role | Notes |
|---|---|---|---|
| 1995 | Shine on Harvey Moon | Mavis | Episode #5.7 |
| 1996 | The Bill | Ms. Rush | Episode: "Bits and Pieces" |
| 1998 | Trial & Retribution | College students | Episode: "Part One" |
| 2003 | The Office | Monkey's date | Episode: "Christmas Special: Part 2" |
| 2003–2006 | Little Britain | Fat Pat | 21 episodes |
| 2004, 2016 | Casualty | Stella Baker / Fiona Porier | 2 episodes |
| 2010 | Rock & Chips | Woman in Cafe | Episode: "Five Gold Rings" |
| 2011 | Skins | Ginny | Episode: "Mini" |
| 2014 | Edge of Heaven | Sue Fingers | 3 episodes |
| 2015 | Cradle to Grave | Mary | 2 episodes |
| 2017 | The Halcyon | Ada | 4 episodes |
| 2019 | Dad's Army: The Lost Episodes | The Woman Opposite | Episode: "Under Fire" |
| 2023 | Mrs Sidhu Investigates | Claudia | Episode #1.1 |
