= Little Britain USA =

- Created by: Ben Silverman; David Walliams; Matt Lucas; Simon Fuller
- Written by: David Walliams; Matt Lucas
- Directed by: Michael Patrick Jann; David Schwimmer
- Starring: David Walliams; Matt Lucas
- Narrated by: Tom Baker
- Country of origin: United States
- Original language: English
- No. of seasons: 1
- No. of episodes: 6 (list of episodes)

Production
- Executive producers: Michael Patrick Jann; Larry Brezner; David Steinberg; Simon Fuller
- Producer: Stephanie Laing
- Production locations: Los Angeles and Wilmington, North Carolina
- Running time: 30 minutes
- Production companies: 19 Entertainment; MBST; HBO Entertainment

Original release
- Network: HBO
- Release: September 28 – November 2, 2008

Related
- Little Britain; Come Fly with Me

Little Britain USA is an American spin-off-continuation of British sketch show, Little Britain, produced by and aired on HBO.

As in the British series, Matt Lucas and David Walliams play most of the characters: originals such as Lou and Andy, Daffyd Thomas, Sebastian Love, Emily Howard, Marjorie Dawes and Vicky Pollard, as well as new characters not previously seen in the British series. The series is narrated by Tom Baker, the narrator from the entirety of the original British series.

The first series started filming in March 2008 in Wilmington, North Carolina. HBO showed the first episode of the season in the United States on September 28, 2008; The Movie Network broadcast it in Canada the same day, followed by BBC One on October 3 in the UK.

New guest-stars include Rachael Harris, Bob Stephenson, Paul Rudd (as the President of France), Hilarie Burton, Vivica A. Fox, and Sting. Michael Patrick Jann served as executive producer of the series and directed most of the shows. David Schwimmer directed studio-based segments of the show. Rosie O'Donnell also makes an appearance in a "Fat Fighters" segment.

The series was released on DVD in the United Kingdom by 2entertain on 24 November 2008.

== Ratings ==
- The first episode attracted 540,000 viewers in the US and 4.7 million viewers in the UK (according to Digital Spy)
- The second episode, when shown in the UK, attracted 4.23 million viewers
- The third episode shown in the UK attracted 4.67 million viewers
- The fourth episode shown in the UK attracted 3.65 million viewers

== Aborted second season ==
On November 27, 2008 on GMTV, Matt Lucas announced plans for another season to air in 2009, however in July 2009, HBO announced the show was cancelled without making a second season, but plan to work with Lucas and Walliams on other projects instead.

In Matt Lucas's autobiography, he wrote that HBO wanted to relaunch the show but first they wanted a ninety-minute special. Lucas and Walliams were reluctant to do ninety minutes of solid sketches and a counter-offer of doing two forty-five minute specials was turned down by the network.

== Reception ==
The show has received a mixed response from critics, garnering a 60% approval rating on review aggregator website Metacritic. Mirror wrote: "The sad truth is Little Britain's mix of Monty Python, Kenny Everett, and Dick Emery has run its course. One-joke characters like Lou and Andy and Carol 'computer says no' Beer are being flogged to death. Walliams and Lucas have spent so much time deciding which frocks to wear, they've forgotten to write any gags. And their desperation to be outrageous is now just shockingly tedious."

== Main characters ==
=== Reprised characters ===
- Lou Todd and Andy Pipkin (go on holiday in Mississippi)
- Vicky Pollard (goes to an American boot camp in Utah after being thrown out of Disney World)
- Emily Howard (goes to America, is arrested in Pittsburgh for shoplifting)
- Daffyd Thomas (goes to university in America)
- Sebastian Love (becomes Prime Minister of the UK)
- Marjorie Dawes (works at an American branch of FatFighters in Delaware)
- Bubbles DeVere (goes on a luxury cruise to Rio de Janeiro)
- Carol Beer (works at an American hospital in Pennsylvania)
- Harvey Pincher (visits his American relatives in Ohio)
- Linda Flint (works at an American university, as does Martin)
- Kenny Craig (deleted Scene - goes grocery shopping and hypnotises a woman to go out with him)

=== New characters ===
- Mildred - A grandmother, played by Lucas, who shares strange and often inappropriate facts about her past with her grandson, Connor (Walliams).
- Mark and Tom, aka the "Gym Buddies", two new bodybuilder characters who brag about their love lives, but reveal their homosexuality several times. In the final episode of the season, the one played by David Walliams reveals that he has had a sex-change operation.
- A "sweet" little school girl called Ellie-Grace who, while sharing love sentiments with her mother before parting with her for a short time, inadvertently comes up with some vulgar ones, often sex related, like, (I love you more than transsexual porn), shocking her mother, who starts to get more stern in reaction. In their final sketch, Ellie-Grace goes for a sleepover and her mother has warned her not to utter any vulgarities. As they are parting, however, her mother accidentally comes up with one herself, traumatising Ellie-Grace.
- Phyllis Church, a woman who owns a Cavalier King Charles Spaniel named "Mr. Doggy" (voiced by Walliams while playing Phyllis), and likes to talk to him, and imitate his replies. In each sketch, using her deep, Mr Doggy voice, commands herself to do anti-social deeds in public. These anti-social deeds include taking off her clothes in public and standing in a trash bin, defecating in public and throwing a brick through a shop window.
- Bing Gordyn - the eighth man (out of nine men) on the Moon and an American counterpart of Denver Mills. Bing tries to impress people with his expedition (by donning his spacesuit or by going on about his exploits, for example), to the extent of requesting plumbers for this purpose, but always fails to impress, most likely because the Moon-landing era has faded away. In his final sketch he pulls a shotgun on a student writing an essay opining that NASA staged all the Moon landings.
- A middle-aged British couple named George and Sandra, who appear in a series of sketches called "Forty Glorious Years". They visit America to celebrate their 40th anniversary. It seems clear, however, that their love died a long time ago - Sandra remains silent when George tries to make conversation (although she utters the word "ornithophobic" in their third appearance): they live permanently in an awkward silence, which makes George angry and verbally abusive to her. In their final sketch, they return to the UK and George insults her.
- A couple go through divorce because the female has realised her homosexuality. The sketch shows her throughout packing up, and her husband discovers many secrets she has kept from him pointing to this, such as merchandise from the lesbian-related television show The L Word. He inadvertently uncovers a secret of his own, implying his own homosexuality.
- Senator White, an American counterpart of Sir Norman Fry; he attempts to cover up his homosexual experiences.
- A pair of hunters who shoot very small animals (such as mice or wasps) as though they were larger targets.
- A pair of bank-robbers too timid to actually rob a bank.
- Two couples on vacation who bump into one another and discover that both are called Steve and Wendy Ashby and live in exactly the same house.

=== Cast ===
- Matt Lucas
- David Walliams
- Tom Baker as the Narrator

=== Guest starring ===
- Peggy Miley as Anna from Fat Fighters
- Brad Grunberg as Tony from Fat Fighters
- Leslie Berger as a member of Fat Fighters
- Geraldine James as Celia Pincher
- Stevie Mack as a member of Fat Fighters
- John Richard Petersen as a member of Fat Fighters
- Matt Malloy
- Nancy Lenehan as Kelly Pincher
- Davenia McFadden as Boot Camp Overseer
- Carla Jimenez as Helen Fisher
- Matt McGrath
- Amy Tipton
- Tom Bower as Pastor
- Julie Brister as a member of Fat Fighters
- Preston Corbell
- Matt Walsh as Business Man at the Urinal/Senator's Press Rep
- Kevin Gould as Handsome Male Student
- Robert Vaughn as Paul Getty II
- Donna Hardy as Ellie Grace's Grandma
- Ethan LePhong as Darren Chow
- Toshi Toda as Japanese Prime Minister Udagawa
- Willie Amakye as President of Ghana
- David Bowe
- James Storm
- Hilarie Burton as Lesbian College Student

=== Special Guests ===
- Rosie O'Donnell as Herself
- Harry Lennix as the United States President
- Ann Cusack as Mom of Little Girl
- Vivica A. Fox as the First Lady
- Paul Rudd as the French President
- Sting as Himself
- Terry Bowden as Church Member

== Episodes ==
Title	Original airdate	Production code	#	Special Total	Overall Total
"Little Britain USA (1)"	28 September 2008 (United States); 3 October 2008 (United Kingdom); 1 November 2009 (Germany)				26
Lou and Andy check into a Mississippi hotel; Andy needs to urinate and does so in the swimming pool behind Lou's back.; Carol Beer, working as a receptionist at a hospital, makes the check-in process impossible.; New American character Ellie-Grace goes off to Scout camp, sharing vulgar love-sentiments with her mother as she boards the bus.; Marjorie Dawes takes a Fat Fighters class; Rosie O'Donnell joins her.; A county sheriff shows his deputies a collection of guns (getting an erection in the process).; Mildred, an 82-year-old granny, talks to her grandson Connor about drugs.; Bing Gordyn - the eighth astronaut to fly to the Moon - talks to a Cub-Scout group.; Phyllis Church strips down to her underwear in public and stands in a trashcan, pretending it's on Mr Doggy's command, and gets arrested.; George and Sandra celebrate their wedding anniversary with dinner and awkward silence.; Mark and Tom, bodybuilders with stereotypically small penises, talk about their sexual exploits (US Airing).; Bubbles Devere gambles everything on the roulette wheel (UK Airing).
"Little Britain USA (2)"	5 October 2008 (United States); 10 October 2008 (United Kingdom)				27
Vicky Pollard arrives at an American boot-camp.; Carol Beer upsets a pregnant woman.; Mildred tells Connor about racism in her day.; A couple get a divorce after it turns out the wife is a lesbian and the husband turns out to be gay.; Marjorie tells the Fat Fighters their low-fat options.; The Pinchers visit their American relatives.; George and Sandra go to the zoo and see the monkeys.; Sebastian Love visits the president of the US.; Phyllis Church poops in public, and pretends that Mr Doggy told her to.; Mark and Tom talk about their sexual exploits (UK Airing).; Bubbles Devere gambles everything on the roulette wheel (US Airing).
"Little Britain USA (3)"	12 October 2008 (United States); 17 October 2008 (United Kingdom)				28
Sebastian meets the French President.; Vicky attends a group-therapy session at her boot camp.; A cleaner looks at men urinating.; A pair of hunters shoot a mouse.; Dafydd Thomas starts a gay-society at his new university.; The Pinchers have breakfast.; Bing Gordyn has his radiator fixed.; Andy steals a toy-car ride.; Bubbles tries to seduce the captain of her cruise ship to talk him out of her paying gambling debts.; The hunters shoot a wasp.; Emily Howard becomes an artist's model.
"Little Britain USA (4)"	19 October 2008 (United States); 24 October 2008 (United Kingdom)				29
Lou and Andy go to a church in the hope that the priest can cure Andy; Ellie Grace has a Bedtime Story read to her; Vicky Pollard gets caught Smoking; A guy thinks he recognises a Waiter he knows; Carol fails getting a woman an appointment; A Business man tries to pitch Butt Cream.; Two Bank Robbers try to Rob a bank.; Sebastian gets given a Photograph as a present and gives the President a diamond necklace.; The Happy Couple are at the Beach but Stuck in the Car because of the rain.; Mildred talks to Connor about being gay; Marjorie expresses anger at one of her attendants who has had a gastric band fitted; Emily sings with Sting
"Little Britain USA (5)"	26 October 2008 (United States); 31 October 2008 (United Kingdom)				30
Emily Howard gets arrested; A student asks Linda Flint about the due-date for his essay; Mark and Tom do stupid things in the gym; Vicky tries to escape from boot-camp; Ellie Grace has her tonsils removed; Starbucks talks about locations for their shops; A senator very similar to Sir Norman Fry gives a statement about a person he met on the street; Two couples called Steve and Wendy Ashby find that they live in exactly the same house; Another student asks Linda about his dissertation; Andy tries to stroke a lion; Phyllis pretends that Mr Doggy tells her to throw a brick through a window, After being put off the ship in Rio and swimming back, Bubbles tries to seduce a rich man; Sebastian passes notes to the President, only to have the last passed on to the next person along
"Little Britain USA (6)"	2 November 2008 (United States); 7 November 2008 (United Kingdom); 23 December 2009 (Australia)				31
Ellie Grace plans to go to stay with twins; this time her mother says something disgusting; Vicky Pollard, in intensive care, has to use a machine to talk; The senator makes another speech about a situation in an airport; Fat Fighters talk about childhood; Carol Beer sorts out a slow-walking, elderly patient registered as "dead", only to receive the finger; Emily Howard goes on a blind date; George and Sandra's flight home gets delayed; Daffyd meets some lesbians on campus; Bing Gordyn meets a student studying faked moon-landings who annoys Bing; Cecilia Pincher overhears her American relatives making fun of them and becomes enraged; The Gym Buddies talk about each other's recent surgery; Andy decides that he no longer needs Lou, but then needs him again
