= Rich (Skins series 5) =

- Skins episode
- Episode no.: Series 5 Episode 2
- Directed by: Philippa Langdale
- Written by: Jamie Brittain
- Original air date: 3 February 2011

Guest appearances
- Napalm Death as themselves; Scarlett Sabet as Angel of Death; Daniel Ryan as Kevin Hardbeck; Huey Morgan as Toxic Bob

Episode chronology
← Previous "Franky"	Next → "Mini"

"Rich" was filmed in September 2010. is the second episode of the fifth series of the British teen drama Skins. It first aired on E4 in the UK on 3 February 2011. The episode focuses on the character Rich Hardbeck (Alexander Arnold) as he attempts to find a girlfriend, with the help of his friend Grace Blood (Jessica Sula).

The episode was filmed in September 2010.

== Plot ==
The episode begins with Rich Hardbeck, a metalhead, playing Slayer at a party he and his friend, Alo are attending, causing the two to get thrown out. Alo, fed up that Rich keeps getting in between him and girls, attempts to persuade him to find a girlfriend of his own. Rich, however, is adamant as to what kind of girl he would like to date - a girl like himself, as he believes that most girls he knows are too shallow for him. Alo promises to help him find one he likes.

The next day, Rich meets Alo in the library, and Alo points out a female metalhead who works in the library, whom Alo nicknames "The Angel of Death." Rich attempts to talk to her, but she simply stares at him coldly, and he is too nervous. Alo, seeing that he needs help learning how to interact with girls, asks Franky, the newest member of the gang, if she can help. Franky, however, admits that she doesn't know anything about girls either, so they decide to ask Grace, an avid ballet dancer, for help. Before Grace can answer, they are interrupted by Grace's friend, Mini, who is not impressed to see Grace hanging out with the three, and especially Franky. Grace, however, meets up with Rich later on in the nearby park, and offers to help him, reasoning that, as she is a good actress, she can easily impersonate a metalhead. Rich is reluctant at first, saying that she represents everything he despises in the world, but eventually agrees. He shows her the girl he likes, and then takes her to his local music store, where Rich and the American owner, Toxic Bob, play her some metal music. When he offers her a complimentary CD, Rich is outraged and makes a sharply sexist remark, causing Grace to storm off. Later on, she challenges him for his rudeness to her, causing him to denounce ballet. Later on, at a pub, Grace shows up acting like a metalhead and can easily name some of Rich's favourite groups, which impresses him. In turn, he informs Grace indirectly that she lets people walk all over her, and she has no self-respect, prompting outrage on Grace's part.

At home, the next morning, Rich is given some money to buy his mother a birthday present by his father, Kevin, whom Rich spurns. He then goes to ask out The Angel of Death, but she rudely refuses, and demonstrates herself to be as shallow as the girls Rich despises. Grace, who has developed feelings for Rich herself, then takes the opportunity to ask him out, but he turns her down, prompting her to run off, crying, and Alo remonstrates him for turning down an attractive girl who asked to date him. But Rich, stubborn as ever, refuses to compromise. He then heads to Toxic Bob's music store and buys a £500 record of music that Bob had previously warned was almost deadly. Rich listens to the record, and it renders him deaf. Distraught, he rips up the ticket to the Napalm Death concert he had intended to go to that night. He then goes and watches one of Grace's ballet concerts. The performance brings tears to his eyes, and Grace sees him in the crowd. Relieved, she suggests they go to the Napalm Death concert together, presenting him with two spare tickets she bought. The two go together and enjoy the concert, and Rich's deafness disappears. He is motivated to make amends with his father.

Rich then meets with Grace outside the school with some flowers (which he later reveals are actually for his mother). Grace mentions it was probably good that nothing happened between them, and then she has to leave, because she does not want Mini to see her with Rich, but flashes the horns as she leaves.
