= List of Little Britain episodes =

Little Britain is a British character-based comedy sketch show which was first broadcast on BBC radio and then turned into a television show. It was written and performed by comic duo David Walliams and Matt Lucas. The show's title is an amalgamation of the terms 'Little England' and 'Great Britain', and is also the name of a Victorian neighbourhood and a modern street in London.

== Series overview ==
=== Radio ===
Series	Episodes	Originally released	
Series	Episodes	First released	Last released
Pilot		3 August 2000	
1	4	6 March 2001	27 March 2001
2	4	12 February 2002	5 March 2002
Comic Relief Special		31 October 2019	

=== Television ===
Series	Episodes	Originally released	
Series	Episodes	First released	Last released
Pilot		9 February 2003	
1	8	16 September 2003	4 November 2003
2	6	19 October 2004	23 November 2004
3	6	17 November 2005	24 December 2005
LBA	2	25 December 2006	30 December 2006

=== USA series ===
Series	Episodes	Originally released	
Series	Episodes	First released	Last released
1	6	28 September 2008	2 November 2008

=== Specials ===
Series	Episodes	Originally released
Comic Relief Special		11 March 2005
Comic Relief Special		11 March 2007
Comic Relief Special		11 March 2009
Comic Relief Special		13 March 2015
Comic Relief Special		18 March 2016
The Big Night In Special		23 April 2020

== Radio series ==
=== Pilot (2000) ===
No. overall	Title	Written by	Original release date
1	"Pilot"	Matt Lucas & David Walliams	3 August 2000
1. Sue Bendelack – House made out of sweets 2. Dennis Waterman – Lucky Runnings; 3. Emily Howard – On the bus 4. Denver Mills – Addressing a conference of Businessmen; 5. Leslie Joseph – Driving lesson with a young man 6. Gary & Jason – At Gary's house 7. Marjorie Dawes – Meera joins 8. Matthew Waterhouse – Meeting with the head of Waddingtons; 9. Martin White – Addressing a group of prospective students 10. Edward & Samantha – Edward comes Home; 11. Daffyd Thomas – New gay in the Village; 12. Edward & Samantha – In bed

=== Series 1 (2001) ===
No. overall	Episode	Written by	Original release date
2	Episode 1	Matt Lucas & David Walliams	6 March 2001
1. Home Secretary – Taking questions from the Press; 2. Latymer Crown – Buffalo, pensioner and blind woman stories 3. Dennis Waterman – Star Wars; 4. Vicky Pollard – Essay on Kitchener; 5. Barry Edwards – Trying to work a new answering machine 6. Emily Howard – At Shadwicks; 7. Kenny Craig – Chicken McNuggets; 8. Cockney Film Star – At the Cinema; 9. Marjorie Dawes – Fat Fighters slimmer of the year 10. Edward & Samantha – Samantha's parents 11. Sir Bernard Chumley – Entertaining a young student 12. Denver Mills – Giving an after dinner speech at the Police Federation; 13. Daffyd Thomas – Calling the Welsh Lesbian and Gay Switchboard; 14. Vicky Pollard – Esaay on Kitchener, part 2
3	Episode 2	Matt Lucas & David Walliams	13 March 2001
1. Kelsey Grammar School – British Literature lesson 2. Daffyd Thomas – At the Hairdressers; 3. Peter Andre – Royal garden party 4. Latymer Crown – Child left alone and one legged man stories 5. Sir Bernard Chumley – Meals on Wheels; 6. Pippa & Gordana – Funny names for babies 7. Leslie Joseph – Driving lesson with a librarian 8. Des Kaye – At a children's birthday party 9. Witness Protection Programme – At the Post Office; 10. Matthew Waterhouse – At the Kissogram agency 11. Vicky Pollard – In court for shoplifting 12. Gary & Jason – At Nan's house 13. The Ghosts – Unable to scare someone
4	Episode 3	Matt Lucas & David Walliams	20 March 2001
1. Emily Howard – At the video store 2. Vicky Pollard – At the Young Offenders Institution; 3. Kenny Craig – On a date 4. Sandra & Olivier – Audition for the part of the Milky Bar kid 5. Denver Mills – Addressing pupils at a school sports day 6. Jackie Paper – Passenger who has been chosen as the new Dalai Lama; 7. Marjorie Dawes – 13-year-old Christopher Halliday joins 8. Dennis Waterman – Macbeth; 9. Prime Minister & Sebastian – In conference with Sebastian; 10. Edward & Samantha – At the nightclub 11. Sir Bernard Chumley – Backstage; 12. Daffyd Thomas – Gay night 13. Dennis Waterman – Minder
5	Episode 4	Matt Lucas & David Walliams	27 March 2001
1. Emily Howard – Lodger; 2. Kenny Craig – At the leisure Centre; 3. Matthew Waterhouse – Visiting the headquarters of Kellogg's; 4. Peter Andre – Princess Anne's visit 5. Joey the Stool – At the library 6. School exam on crisps 7. Robot careers advisor 8. David Franks – At the Chuckle club 9. Prime Minister & Sebastian – Meeting Gregory; 10. Micky Noone – Making a speech at the Community centre 11. Des Kaye – At the children's ward 12. Jason – Visiting Gary's nan 13. Marjorie Dawes – Visit from the Fat Fighters inspector 14. Des Kaye – Turns off the switch to a child's life support machine

=== Series 2 (2002) ===
No. overall	Episode	Written by	Original release date
6	Episode 1	Matt Lucas & David Walliams	12 February 2002
1. Vicky Pollard – At the doctor's 2. Prime Minister & Sebastian; 3. Viv – Robbery; 4. Father Peter – Funeral; 5. Marjorie Dawes – Visiting her mother 6. April & Neville – Neville's first football game 7. PCs Bryce & Rawlinson – Going out and going to come back in again 8. Mrs O'Mara – At the hairdressers 9. Aberdoon Stook Hoose – Soup; 10. Kenny Craig – Playing Scrabble with his mother 11. Alan Markus – Amnesia; 12. Nanny – Benjamin leaves to go to University; 13. Daffyd Thomas – At the newsagent 14. Viv – Cleaning the Church
7	Episode 2	Matt Lucas & David Walliams	19 February 2002
1. Harry Todd – Rumours that Harry started World War II; 2. Sandra & Olivier Lawrence – Letter to the Royal Shakespeare Company; 3. Dennis Waterman – Dinner at Jeremy's; 4. Sleepy Dad – On the way Home from the theatre 5. Denver Mills – Launching a charity campaign 6. Criminal Records in Humble; 7. Nanny – Mess in the kitchen 8. Mr. Bently – Addressing the staff at an urgent meeting 9. Dr Winkileman; 10. Peter Cramer – Visiting the Young Men's Christian Association; 11. Lottery winner 12. Peter Cramer – At the YMCA (Part 2); 13. Des Kaye – Working as a warm up man at Sneddy Studios; 14. Peter Cramer – At the YMCA (Part 3); 15. Daffyd Thomas – Myfanwy comes out as lesbian 16. Viv – Looking at exotic insects and a black widow spider
8	Episode 3	Matt Lucas & David Walliams	26 February 2002
1. April & Neville – At a tribunal 2. Kenny Craig – Car boot sale 3. Aberdoon Stook Hoose – Restaurant critic speaks to the chef 4. Roy's Toys – Pirate memory games 5. Father Peter – Talking to Ian Cooper about his separation 6. Emily Howard – At the pub 7. Mrs. O'Mara – Celebrating her birthday 8. Denver Mills – Launching a new fizzy drink 9. Prime Minister & Sebastian – Meeting with the Italian Prime Minister; 10. Cliff Turner – Taking visitors on a tour of Pove; 11. Douglas Stewart – Meeting a potential publisher for a new novel 12. Marjorie Dawes – Marjorie's sister Barbera visits 13. Eileen & Janet
9	Episode 4	Matt Lucas & David Walliams	5 March 2002
1. April & Roy – Can't agree 2. Dennis Waterman – Jeremy's birthday 3. Marjorie Dawes – Marjorie meets Paul at the supermarket 4. Aberdoon Stook Hoose – Nut allergy 5. Sleepy Dad – At Home; 6. Father Peter – Drawing the raffle at the Church Féte; 7. Grace Evans – On the phone to the Brtannia Cat Club; 8. National Lottery Winner – Old friend 9. Burglar & Dad – Dad complains about the son's clothing 10. Sandra & Olivier Lawrence – Auditioning for a Rowntrees advert 11. Dame Sally Markham; 12. PCs Bryce & Rawlinson – Wrong Mrs. Harris; 13. Darren Cooper – Joining the Army; 14. Emily Howard – In an ambulance 15. Vicky Pollard – Visit from a social worker 16. PCs Bryce & Rawlinson – The right Mrs. Harris

=== Special (2019) ===
No. overall	Title	Written by	Original release date
44	"Little Brexit"	Matt Lucas & David Walliams	31 October 2019
1. Vicky Pollard – At school 2. Lou & Andy – At the charity shop 3. Carol Beer – Brexit Says No!; 4. Dennis Waterman – Britain Take a Bow; 5. Matthew Waterhouse – Brexit the Board Game; 6. Daffyd Thomas – Grindr; 7. Maggie & Judy – Hospital; 8. Ray McCooney – Jobs; 9. Linda Flint – The Evil Traitor; 10. Sebastian – Boris Johnson; 11. Viv – Politicians

== Television series ==
=== Pilot (2003) ===
No. overall	Title	Directed by	Written by	Original release date
10	"Pilot"	Graham Linehan	Matt Lucas & David Walliams	9 February 2003
1. Vicky Pollard – Court; 2. Aberdoon Stook Hoose – Soup Recipe; 3. Latymer – Buffalo; 4. Emily Howard – Swimming Pool; 5. Mr. Mann & Roy – Toy Shop; 6. Prime Minister & Sebastian – Press Conference; 7. Latymer – Pensioner; 8. Marjorie Dawes – Young Member; 9. Prime Minister & Sebastian – Prime Minister; 10. Dennis Waterman – Lucky Runnings; 11. Jason – Nan's House; 12. Latymer – Lullaby; 13. Daffyd Thomas – Another Gay in the Village; 14. World Record Attempt – Domino Toppling

=== Series 1 (2003) ===
No. overall	Episode	Directed by	Written by	Original release date
11	Bath of Beans	Steve Bendelack	Matt Lucas & David Walliams	16 September 2003
1. Vicky Pollard – Essay (Part 1); 2. Sebastian & Prime Minister – Gregory; 3. Emily Howard – Pub; 4. Lou & Andy – Opera; 5. Kelsey Grammar School – Great Expectations; 6. Jason – Nan; 7. Pianist – Bag; 8. Kenny Craig – Restaurant Date; 9. Dennis Waterman – Macbeth; 10. Marjorie Dawes – Cravings; 11. Ray McCooney – Soup; 12. Lou & Andy – Swimming Pool; 13. Daffyd Thomas – New Gay in the Village; 14. Vicky Pollard – Essay (Part 2); 15. Black & White Minstrels – Radio; 16. World Record Attempt – Bath of Beans
12	Tallest Man	Steve Bendelack	Matt Lucas & David Walliams	23 September 2003
1. Daffyd Thomas – Gay Times; 2. Lou & Andy – Smurf Outfit; 3. Vicky Pollard – Swimming Pool; 4. Kelsey Grammar School – Test on Crisps (Part 1); 5. Anne – Office; 6. Sebastian & Prime Minister – Briefing; 7. Anne – Garden; 8. Kelsey Grammar School – Test on Crisps (Part 2); 9. Lou & Andy – Bathroom; 10. Dame Sally Markham – The Lady in White; 11. Rod & Jane – David Soul; 12. Marjorie Dawes – Slimmer of the Year; 13. Anne – Dining Room; 14. Jason – Sunday Lunch; 15. Kelsey Grammar School – Test on Crisps (Part 3); 16. Liz & Clive – Ordering; 17. Rod & Jane – Les McKeown; 18. Officer Lindsay – Driving Lesson; 19. World Record Attempt – Tallest Man
13	Hard-Boiled Egg Eating	Steve Bendelack	Matt Lucas & David Walliams	30 September 2003
1. Sebastian & Prime Minister – Headlines; 2. Vicky Pollard – Pub; 3. Lou & Andy – Ice Cream; 4. Kelsey Grammar School – New Pupil (Part 1); 5. Kenny Craig – Hospital; 6. Black & White Minstrels – B&B; 7. Marjorie Dawes – New Member; 8. Kelsey Grammar School – New Pupil (Part 2); 9. Pianist – Sainsbury's; 10. Daffyd Thomas – Gay Trekkies; 11. Lou & Andy – Video Store; 12. Emily Howard – Guesthouse; 13. Sir Bernard Chumley – Budding Actor; 14. Ray McCooney – Food Critic; 15. Kelsey Grammar School – New Pupil (Part 3); 16. Dame Sally Markham – Children's Book; 17. Denver Mills – 'Hug A Leper Week'; 18. World Record Attempt – Hard Boiled Eggs
14	Most Cigarettes in a Mouth	Steve Bendelack	Matt Lucas & David Walliams	7 October 2003
1. Daffyd Thomas – Hairdresser's; 2. Emily Howard – X-Ray; 3. Lou & Andy – Pub; 4. Anne – Library (Part 1); 5. Vicky Pollard – Court; 6. Matthew Waterhouse – Kissogram; 7. Kelsey Grammar School – Mathematics; 8. Sandra & Ralph – Advert; 9. Anne – Library (Part 2); 10. Marjorie Dawes – Hospital; 11. Des Kaye – Helping A Customer; 12. Anne – Library (Part 3); 13. Peter Andre – Highgrove; 14. Lou & Andy – Chocolates; 15. April & Neville – Opera; 16. Ray McCooney – American Tourists; 17. Dame Sally Markham – Lady Chatterley's Lover; 18. Dennis Waterman – Jeremy's Birthday; 19. Liz & Clive – Beatles; 20. World Record Attempt – Cigarettes
15	Biggest House of Cards	Steve Bendelack	Matt Lucas & David Walliams	14 October 2003
1. Vicky Pollard – Borstal; 2. Lou & Andy – Pet Shop; 3. Prime Minister & Sebastian – Press Conference; 4. Marjorie Dawes – Liposuction; 5. Edward & Samantha – Valentine's Day; 6. Kelsey Grammar School – Career Advisor; 7. Lou & Andy – Library; 8. Edward & Samantha – Evening Out; 9. Sir Bernard Chumley – Meals on Wheels; 10. Peter Andre – Garden Party; 11. Kenny Craig – Car Boot Sale; 12. Matthew Waterhouse – Musicals; 13. Daffyd Thomas – The Test; 14. Denver Mills – School Prize Giving; 15. Lou & Andy – Hospital; 16. Eileen & Janet – Ivor; 17. Des Kaye – Tea Break; 18. World Record Attempt – House of Cards
16	Smallest Ant	Steve Bendelack	Matt Lucas & David Walliams	21 October 2003
1. Sebastian & Prime Minister – The Chancellor; 2. Dennis Waterman – Minder; 3. Vicky Pollard – Doctor; 4. Denver Mills – After Dinner Speech; 5. Lou & Andy – Birthday Cards; 6. Marjorie Dawes – Supermarket; 7. Ray McCooney – TV Repair Man; 8. Anne – Country Cottage (Part 1); 9. Des Kaye – Robin & Dicky; 10. Lou & Andy – Holiday; 11. Kelsey Grammar School – Notice; 12. Sandra & Ralph – RSC; 13. Anne – Country Cottage (Part 2); 14. Pianist – Room 101; 15. Dame Sally Markham – Bible; 16. Matthew Waterhouse – Cereals; 17. Lou & Andy – Trousers; 18. Whitelaw – Charity Shop; 19. Anne – Country Cottage (Part 3); 20. Emily Howard – Seafront; 21. World Record Attempt – World's Smallest Ant
17	Largest Mince Pie	Steve Bendelack	Matt Lucas & David Walliams	28 October 2003
1. Vicky Pollard – Social Worker; 2. Mr. Mann & Roy – Toy Shop (Part 1); 3. Marjorie Dawes – Paul; 4. Lou & Andy – Painting Andy's Room; 5. Len Boothe – Pove Village Tours; 6. Daffyd Thomas – Gay Night; 7. Edward & Samantha – Parents' Evening (Part 1); 8. Sir Bernard Chumley – Undertaker; 9. Matthew Waterhouse – Board Games; 10. Kelsey Grammar School – New Teacher; 11. Edward & Samantha – Parents Evening (Part 2); 12. Sandra & Ralph – Audition; 13. Prime Minister & Sebastian – Hotel; 14. Lou & Andy – New Wheelchair; 15. Mr. Mann & Roy – Toy Shop (Part 2); 16. Jason – Visit; 17. Edward & Samantha – Filling In; 18. World Record Attempt – World's Largest Mince Pie
18	Most People in a Mini	Steve Bendelack	Matt Lucas & David Walliams	4 November 2003
1. Emily Howard – Ice-Cream Van; 2. Daffyd Thomas – Myfanwy Comes Out; 3. Boris – Babysitter (Part 1); 4. Vicky Pollard – Reformed Character; 5. Lou & Andy – Bonfire; 6. Boris – Babysitter (Part 2); 7. Kelsey Grammar School – Test Results; 8. Ray McCooney – Tax Inspector; 9. Dame Sally Markham – Radio; 10. Marjorie Dawes – Inspector; 11. Pianist – SMS; 12. Jason – Presents; 13. Liz & Clive – Mollie Sugden (Guest Star: Mollie Sugden); 14. Prime Minister & Sebastian – Italian PM; 15. Lou & Andy – Supermarket; 16. World Record Attempt – Most People in a Mini
–	Deleted Scenes	Steve Bendelack	Matt Lucas & David Walliams	DVD only
1. April & Neville – Accident & Emergency Department; 2. April & Neville – Court; 3. The Cancer Corporation – Cure For Cancer; 4. Des Kaye – Hospital; 5. Edward & Samantha – In Bed; 6. Peter Andre – Keith Harris & Orville; 7. Mr. Cleeves – Chemistry; 8. Mr. Cleeves – Biology; 9. Mr. Cleeves – Notice; 10. Mr. Cleeves – Notice 2; 11. Mr. Cleeves – Literature; 12. Mr. Cleeves – Homework; 13. Douglas Stirling – Publisher; 14. The Pianist – Newspaper; 15. The Pianist – Toffee; 16. The Pianist – Orange Juice; 17. The Pianist – Actor; 18. Barry Edwards – Answerphone; 19. Rod & Jane – Hospital; 20. Rod & Jane – Phone Call; 21. French Lady; 22. Peter Andre – Drug Rehab Centre; 23. Minster – Employment; 24. Latymer - Music; 25. Edward and Samantha - Valentine's Day; 26. Latymer - Boy; 27. Jason - Nan; 28. Denver Mills - Sports Day

=== Series 2 (2004) ===
No. overall	Episode	Directed by	Written by	Original release date
19	Episode 1	Matt Lipsey	Matt Lucas & David Walliams	19 October 2004
1. Vicky Pollard – Supermarket; 2. Emily & Florence – Cafe; 3. Bubbles DeVere – Avoids Paying Charges at Health Spa; 4. Lou & Andy – The Price Is Right; 5. Maggie & Judy – Jams; 6. Daffyd Thomas – Parents; 7. Marjorie Dawes – Vanessa Feltz; 8. Carol Beer – Computer Says No!; 9. Harvey Pincher – Bitty!; 10. Mr. Mann & Roy – Dating Agency; 11. Prime Minister & Sebastian – Jealousy; 12. Maggie & Judy – Fairy Cake; 13. Lou & Andy – The Pond
20	Episode 2	Matt Lipsey	Matt Lucas & David Walliams	26 October 2004
1. Emily & Florence – Wedding Dress; 2. Prime Minister & Sebastian – US President; 3. Bubbles DeVere – Solarium; 4. Lou & Andy – Girlfriend; 5. Linda Flint – Big Fat Lesbian; 6. Anne – Bowling; 7. Marjorie Dawes – Pat & Paul; 8. Daffyd Thomas – The Fair; 9. Linda Flint – Ching Chong Chinaman; 10. Harvey Pincher – Restaurant; 11. Carol Beer – Child's Account; 12. Vicky Pollard – Roller Skating; 13. Dennis Waterman – Agent; 14. Linda Flint – Oompa Loompa; 15. Mr. Mann & Roy – Video Rental; 16. Maggie & Judy – Cake; 17. Lou & Andy – Horse
21	Episode 3	Matt Lipsey	Matt Lucas & David Walliams	2 November 2004
1. Vicky Pollard – Bus; 2. Lou & Andy – Ice Skating; 3. Viv Tudor – Jewellery Shop; 4. Mr. T – Gym; 5. Emily & Florence – Football; 6. Marjorie Dawes – Meera's Lottery Win; 7. Prime Minister & Sebastian – Old friends 8. Kenny Craig – Mother; 9. Anne – Feeding The Ducks; 10. Mr. Mann & Roy – Birthday Cards; 11. PCs Bryce and Rawlinson – Dead Husband (Part 1); 12. Dennis Waterman – Never Mind the Buzzcocks; 13. PCs Bryce and Rawlinson – Dead Husband (Part 2); 14. Daffyd Thomas – James Corden Comes Out; 15. Lou & Andy – Parking Space
22	Episode 4	Matt Lipsey	Matt Lucas & David Walliams	9 November 2004
1. Vicky Pollard – Eyewitness; 2. Maggie & Judy – Annual Carol Service; 3. Newsagent; 4. Michael Dinner – Double Decker; 5. Emily & Florence – Ballet; 6. Lou & Andy – Baby Jesus; 7. Anne – Stage play 8. Marjorie Dawes – Restaurant; 9. Daffyd Thomas – The Library; 10. Michael Dinner – Lion & Peperami; 11. Prime Minister & Sebastian – Pregnancy; 12. Carol Beer – Young Couple; 13. Harvey Pincher – Wedding Caterer; 14. Kenny Craig – Parking Lot; 15. Michael Dinner – Um Bongo & Monster Munch; 16. Mr. Mann & Roy – Book Shop; 17. Bubbles DeVere – Cheque; 18. Lou & Andy – Climbing A Tree
23	Episode 5	Matt Lipsey	Matt Lucas & David Walliams	16 November 2004
1. Lou & Andy – Bowling; 2. Vicky Pollard – Backstage; 3. Emily & Florence – Tennis; 4. Dr. Low – Lady; 5. Marjorie Dawes – Low Fat Puddings; 6. Mrs. B – Builders; 7. Viv Tudor – Police Station; 8. Prime Minister & Sebastian – TV Interview; 9. Dr. Low – Man; 10. Kenny Craig – Girlfriend; 11. Michael Dinner – Yorkie; 12. Drug Rehab Centre; 13. Anne – Drawings; 14. Dennis Waterman – Job; 15. Carol Beer – Co-Workers; 16. Daffyd Thomas – Myfanwy's Wedding; 17. Lou & Andy – France
24	Episode 6	Matt Lipsey	Matt Lucas & David Walliams	23 November 2004
1. Lou & Andy – Blind Date; 2. Vicky Pollard – Boyfriend; 3. Rachel & Nicola – Restaurant (Part 1); 4. Reverend Jesee King; 5. Marjorie Dawes – Engagement Party; 6. Kenny Craig – Hypnotic Show (Part 1); 7. Daffyd Thomas – Gay Rugby League; 8. Kenny Craig – Hypnotic Show (Part 2); 9. Rachel & Nicola – Restaurant (Part 2); 10. Harvey Pincher – Wedding; 11. Dennis Waterman – Star Wars; 12. Bubbles DeVere – Meeting; 13. Mr. Mann & Roy – Record; 14. Rachel & Nicola – Restaurant (Part 3); 15. Maggie & Judy – Bring & Buy Sale; 16. Prime Minister & Sebastian – Election Night Party; 17. Lou & Andy – Seaside
–	Deleted Scenes	Matt Lipsey	Matt Lucas & David Walliams	DVD only
1. Ruth – Refuse Collector; 2. Harvey Pincher – Romeo & Juliet; 3. Benjy – Party; 4. Gary & Jason – Ding Dong; 5. Kim & Jill – Sunbathing; 6. Ruth – Window Washer; 7. Eugene – Telling Off; 8. Ralph & Diana – Dinner Party; 9. Amnesiac Alan – Bathtime; 10. Eugene – Telling Off Again; 11. Carol Beer – Quality Bank Account; 12. Peter & Cathy – Dinner Party; 13. Doctor – Phone Gossip; 14. Eugene – Ignition; 15. Ruth – Lesbian; 16. Drug Rehab Centre; 17. Roland – Birthday; 18. Roland – Harvest Festival; 19. Drug Rehab Centre – Son; 20. Roland – Famous People; 21. Mrs. B – Lunch; 22. Mrs. B – Builders; 23. Emily Howard – Ignored; 24. Carol Beer – Expenses Problem; 25. Man Liam Buckley – Plastic Surgeon; 26. Michael Dinner – Restaurant (Part 1); 27. Michael Dinner – Restaurant (Part 2)

=== Series 3 (2005) ===
No. overall	Episode	Directed by	Written by	Original release date	UK viewers (millions)
26	Episode 1	Declan Lowney	Matt Lucas & David Walliams	17 November 2005	10.17
1. Bubbles and Desiree – Breakfast; 2. Lou & Andy – Aquarium; 3. Dudley & Ting Tong – Ting Tong Arrives; 4. Vicky Pollard – Dance Off; 5. Mrs. Emery – Supermarket & Jumble Sale; 6. Emily & Florence – Facial Hair Problem; 7. Sir Norman Fry – Hitchhiker; 8. Carol Beer– Flight To Toronto; 9. Daffyd Thomas – Rent Boy; 10. Anne – Stars in Their Eyes (guest star Cat Deeley); 11. Linda Flint – BALDY!; 12. Marjorie Dawes – Spray Tan; 13. Prime Minister & Sebastian – Arms To Iran; 14. Lou & Andy – Air Show
27	Episode 2	Declan Lowney	Matt Lucas & David Walliams	24 November 2005	8.29
1. Lou & Andy – Richard & Judy; 2. Mrs. Emery – Post Office; 3. Vicky Pollard – Chat Line; 4. Dudley & Ting Tong – Lady Boy; 5. Bubbles and Desiree – Steam Room; 6. Linda Flint – Magnum PI; 7. Marjorie Dawes – Derek, The Fitness Trainer; 8. Leonard – Cup of Tea; 9. Daffyd Thomas – Girlfriend; 10. Mr. Mann & Roy – Paintings Shop; 11. Pat & Don – King Prawn Vindaloo; 12. Maggie & Judy – Hospital; 13. Prime Minister & Sebastian – Confidence; 14. Lou & Andy – Thames Cruise
28	Episode 3	Declan Lowney	Matt Lucas & David Walliams	1 December 2005	7.10
1. Vicky Pollard – PR Agent's Office; 2. Lou & Andy – Breast Enlargement; 3. Anne – Pianist; 4. Carol Beer – Golden Wedding Anniversary Cruise; 5. Dudley & Ting Tong – Trivial Pursuit; 6. Sir Norman Fry – Toilet; 7. Marjorie Dawes – Charlie Slater; 8. Letty Bell – Birthday; 9. Bubbles and Desiree – Massage; 10. Orville – Supermarket; 11. Pat & Don – Chicken Jalfrezi; 12. Prime Minister & Sebastian – Affair Scandal; 13. Alan – Old Couple; 14. Maggie & Judy – Parish Newsletter; 15. Lou & Andy – Motorcycle
29	Episode 4	Declan Lowney	Matt Lucas & David Walliams	8 December 2005	6.96
1. Mrs. Emery – Library; 2. Emily & Florence – Stag Party; 3. Dudley & Ting Tong – Mother; 4. Bubbles and Desiree – Sauna; 5. Warren – Hospital; 6. Carol Beer – Cephalonia; 7. Marjorie Dawes – Baby; 8. Sid Pegg – Gypsies; 9. Daffyd Thomas – Election; 10. Linda Flint – "Ali Bongo"; 11. Mr. Mann & Roy – Problem Feet Magazine; 12. Prime Minister & Sebastian – Moustache; 13. Maggie & Judy – Dogs; 14. Lou & Andy – Frisbee
30	Episode 5	Declan Lowney	Matt Lucas & David Walliams	15 December 2005	6.93
1. Lou & Andy – Making Patio; 2. Carol Beer – Travel Agent's Insurance; 3. Vicky Pollard – Babysitter (Part 1); 4. Linda Flint – Molly The Mole; 5. Sir Norman Fry – Dating Website; 6. Marjorie Dawes – Demotivators Slideshow; 7. Vicky Pollard – Babysitter (Part 2); 8. Ashraf The Horse Whisperer – Computer Shop; 9. Daffyd Thomas – Get A Job; 10. Sid Pegg – Self Defence; 11. Mr. Mann – Fancy Dress Shop; 12. Lou & Andy – Rugby Match; 13. Prime Minister & Sebastian – Arab-Israeli Treaty; 14. Emily & Florence – Baby
31	Episode 6	Declan Lowney	Matt Lucas & David Walliams	24 December 2005	8.45
1. Vicky Pollard – Lottery; 2. Bubbles and Desiree – Acupuncture; 3. Carol Beer – Computer Says Yes!; 4. Lou & Andy – Replacement; 5. Emily Howard – Florence; 6. Linda Flint – Fatty Fatty Boom Boom; 7. Andy and Mrs Mead – Cleaning; 8. Mrs. Emery – At The Doctors; 9. Marjorie Dawes – Sorry; 10. Linda Flint – Cast of Fraggle Rock; 11. Leonard – Dinner; 12. Andy and Mrs Mead – Dinner; 13. Daffyd Thomas – London; 14. Anne – Christmas Decorations; 15. Dudley & Ting Tong – Thai Restaurant; 16. Prime Minister & Sebastian – PM Resignation; 17. Andy and Mrs Mead – Out for a Walk; 18. Lou & Andy (Post Credits) – Lou Returns

=== Little Britain Abroad (2006) ===
No. overall	Episode	Directed by	Written by	Original release date	UK viewers (millions)
32	Episode 1	Matt Lipsey & Geoff Posner	Matt Lucas & David Walliams	25 December 2006	8.87
1. Lou & Andy – Walt Disney World Resort; 2. Anne – Louvre; 3. Carol Beer – Spain; 4. Daffyd Thomas – Mykonos; 5. Lou & Andy – Aeroplane; 6. Maggie & Judy – Rome; 7. Carol Beer – Excursion; 8. Vicky Pollard – Thai Jail; 9. Daffyd Thomas – Mykonos Beach; 10. Lou & Andy – Cockpit Invitation (Guest Star: Steve Coogan); 11. Marjorie Dawes (FatFighters USA) – Florida; 12. Daffyd Thomas – Bar Opening Night; 13. Carol Beer – Fake crying 14. Bubbles Devere – Monte Carlo (Guest star: Ronnie Corbett); 15. Lou & Andy – Plane Crash (Part 1)
33	Episode 2	Matt Lipsey & Geoff Posner	Matt Lucas & David Walliams	30 December 2006	7.18
1. Lou & Andy – Plane Crash (Part 2); 2. Vicky Pollard – Thai Jail Court (Guest star:Dawn French); 3. Dudley & Ting Tong – Honeymoon in Belgium (Guest star:Peter Kay); 4. Bubbles DeVere – Dress Shopping in Klosters; 5. Lou & Andy – Plane Crash (Part 3); 6. Dudley & Ting Tong – Sex Shop; 7. Anne – Vatican; 8. Kenny Craig – Paul McKenna in Portugal; 9. Lou & Andy – Plane Crash (Part 4); 10. Mr. Mann & Roy – Morocco; 11. Prime Minister & Sebastian – White House (Part 1); 12. Marjorie Dawes (FatFighters UK) – American Replacement; 13. Lou & Andy – Plane Crash (Part 5); 14. Dudley & Ting Tong – Porn Film; 15. Prime Minister & Sebastian – White House (Part 2); 16. Lou & Andy – Back Home

=== Little Britain USA (2008) ===
No. overall	Episode	Directed by	Written by	Original release date	UK viewers (millions)
35	Episode 1	Michael Patrick Jann & David Schwimmer	Matt Lucas & David Walliams	28 September 2008 (US); 3 October 2008 (UK)	5.05
1. Lou & Andy – Hotel; 2. Carol Beer – Operation; 3. Ellie Grace – Scout Camp; 4. Marjorie Dawes – Rosie O'Donell; 5. Officer – Erection; 6. Mildred – Drugs; 7. Bing Gordyn – Cub Scout Group; 8. Phyllis Church – Stripper; 9. George & Sandra – Restaurant; 10. Bubbles DeVere – Gambling
36	Episode 2	Michael Patrick Jann & David Schwimmer	Matt Lucas & David Walliams	5 October 2008 (US); 10 October 2008 (UK)	4.60
1. Vicky Pollard – Boot Camp; 2. Carol Beer – Pregnant Woman; 3. Mildred – Racism; 4. Divorced Couple; 5. Marjorie Dawes – Low Fat Options; 6. Harvey Pincher – Relatives; 7. George & Sandra – Zoo; 8. Prime Minister & Sebastian – American President; 9. Phyllis Church – Pooping in Public; 10. Mark & Tom – Sexual Exploits
37	Episode 3	Michael Patrick Jann & David Schwimmer	Matt Lucas & David Walliams	12 October 2008 (US); 17 October 2008 (UK)	4.64
1. Prime Minister & Sebastian – French President; 2. Vicky Pollard – Group Therapy; 3. Cleaner – Man Urinating; 4. American Hunters – Mouse; 5. Dafydd Thomas – Gay Society; 6. Harvey Pincher – Breakfast; 7. Bing Gordyn – Radiator; 8. Lou & Andy – Toy Car Ride; 9. Bubbles DeVere – Seducing the Captain; 10. American Hunters – Wasp; 11. Emily Howard – Artist's Model
38	Episode 4	Michael Patrick Jann & David Schwimmer	Matt Lucas & David Walliams	19 October 2008 (US); 24 October 2008 (UK)	N/A
1. Lou & Andy – US Church; 2. Ellie Grace – Bedroom; 3. Vicky Pollard – Smoking in the Showers; 4. Diner – Familiar Waiter; 5. Carol Beer – Old Lady; 6. Company – Latest Range; 7. American Bank Robbers – Failed Robbery; 8. Prime Minister & Sebastian – Necklace; 9. George & Sandra – Thunder Storm; 10. Mildred – Gay; 11. Marjorie Dawes – Gastric Band; 12. Emily Howard – Sting
39	Episode 5	Michael Patrick Jann & David Schwimmer	Matt Lucas & David Walliams	26 October 2008 (US); 31 October 2008 (UK)	N/A
1. Emily Howard – Arrested; 2. Linda Flint – Dwarf; 3. Mark & Tom – Erections; 4. Vicky Pollard – Escape Plan; 5. Ellie Grace – Tonsils; 6. Starbucks – Locations; 7. Senator White – Homeless Person; 8. Steve & Wendy – Same House; 9. Linda Flint – Lady boy 10. Lou & Andy – Zoo; 11. Phyllis Church – Brick in Window; 12. Bubbles DeVere – Rich Man; 13. Prime Minister & Sebastian – Cheeky Notes
40	Episode 6	Michael Patrick Jann & David Schwimmer	Matt Lucas & David Walliams	2 November 2008 (US); 7 November 2008 (UK)	N/A
1. Ellie Grace – Twins' House; 2. Vicky Pollard – Intensive Care; 3. Senator White – Airport Situation; 4. Marjorie Dawes – Childhood; 5. Carol Beer – Elderly Patient; 6. Emily Howard – Blind Date; 7. George & Sandra – Delayed Flight; 8. Daffyd Thomas – Lesbians on Campus; 9. Bing Gordyn – Student; 10. Harvey Pincher – Nappy; 11. Mark & Tom – Recent Surgery; 12. Lou & Andy – I Don't Need You Anymore (But Does)

== Comic Relief specials ==
=== Comic Relief Special (2005) ===
No. overall	Title	Directed by	Written by	Original release date
25	"Comic Relief Special I"	Unknown	Matt Lucas & David Walliams	11 March 2005
1. Lou & Andy – George Michael; 2. Prime Minister & Sebastian – The Admiral; 3. Judy & Maggie – Scouts; 4. Vicky Pollard – Trisha; 5. Carol Beer – Fun Run; 6. Daffyd Thomas – Sir Elton John Interview; 7. Restaurant – Hubba Bubba; 8. Dennis Waterman – Chitty Chitty Bang Bang; 9. Florence & Emily – Robbie Williams; 10. Lou & Andy – Athletic Ground

=== Comic Relief Special: Comic Relief Does Little Britain Live (2007) ===
No. overall	Title	Directed by	Written by	Original release date
34	"Comic Relief Special II"	Matt Lipsey	Matt Lucas & David Walliams	11 March 2007
1. Lou & Andy – Introduction; 2. Emily & Florence – Plumber (Guest Star: Russell Brand); 3. Vicky Pollard – School Return (Guest Star: Kate Moss); 4. Linda Flint – Three Students (Guest Star: Patsy Kensit); 5. Maggie & Judy – Village Fête (Guest Star: Jonathan Ross); 6. Anne – Stars in Their Eyes (Guest Star: Kate Thornton); 7. Marjorie Dawes – New Member (Guest Star: Chris Moyles); 8. Dennis Waterman – Big Brother (Guest Star: Dennis Waterman); 9. Brian Potter – Guest Appearance (Guest Star: Peter Kay); 10. Des Kaye – Children's Entertainment Show (Guest Stars: David Baddiel & Jeremy Edwards); 11. Daffyd Thomas – The Big Finale (Guest Star: Dawn French)

=== Comic Relief Special (2009) ===
No. overall	Title	Directed by	Written by	Original release date
41	"Comic Relief 2009 Special"	Unknown	Matt Lucas & David Walliams	11 March 2009
1. Ellie Grace – The Sleepover (Guest Star: Robbie Williams); 2. Carol Beer – Customer Popularity Review (Guest Star: Catherine Tate)

=== Comic Relief Special (2015) ===
No. overall	Title	Directed by	Written by	Original release date
42	"Comic Relief, 2015, Little Britain Sketch"	Unknown	Matt Lucas & David Walliams	13 March 2015
1. Lou – Visiting the Church (Guest Star: Stephen Hawking and Catherine Tate)

=== Sport Relief Special (2016) ===
No. overall	Title	Directed by	Written by	Original release date
43	"Sport Relief - 2016: Little Britain’s Emily Howard"	Unknown	Matt Lucas & David Walliams	18 March 2016
1. Emily Howard – England Women (Guest Star: Peter Crouch)
