= Little Britain (TV series) =

British character-based sketch comedy

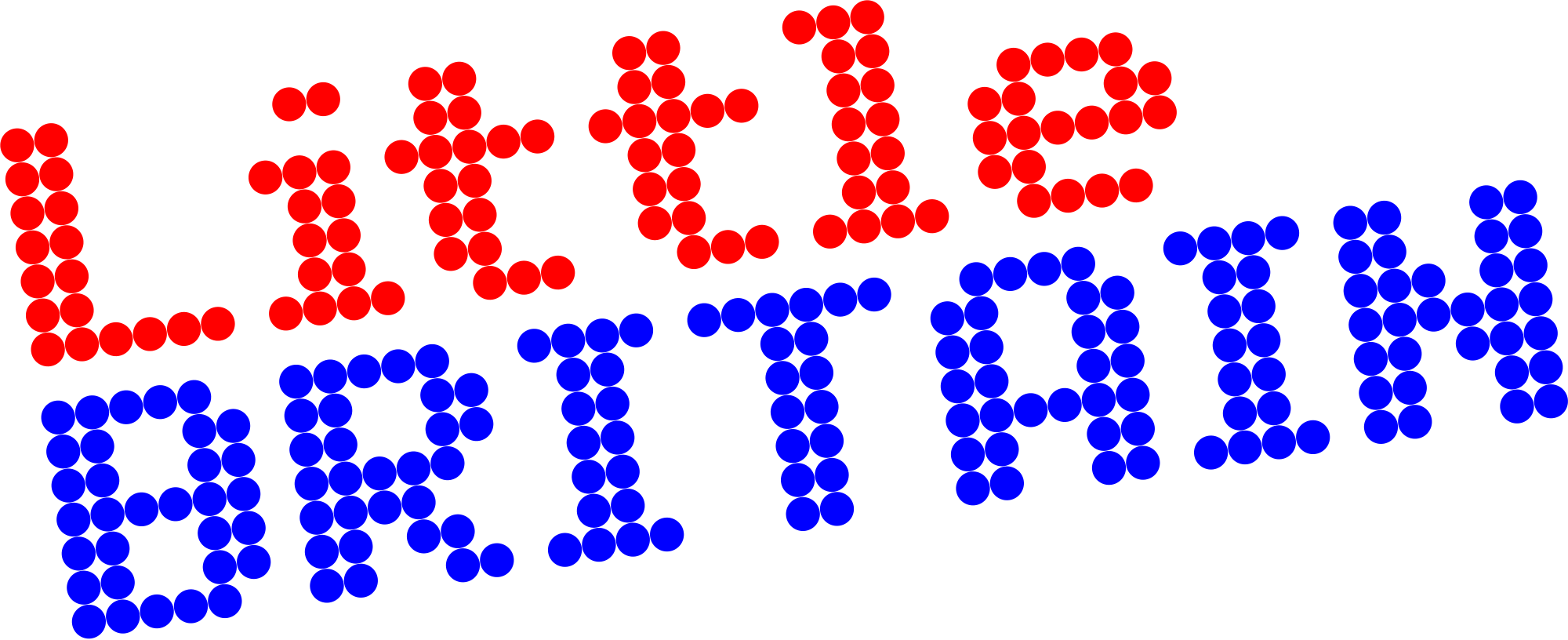
- Genre: Sketch comedy
- Created by: David Walliams; Matt Lucas
- Written by: David Walliams; Matt Lucas
- Starring: David Walliams; Matt Lucas; Anthony Head; Ruth Jones; Charu Bala Chokshi; Stirling Gallacher; Joann Condon; Paul Putner; Sally Rogers
- Narrated by: Tom Baker
- Composer: David Arnold
- Country of origin: United Kingdom
- Original language: English
- No. of series: 3
- No. of episodes: 23 (list of episodes)

Production
- Running time: 30 minutes
- Production company: BBC

Original release
- Network: BBC Radio 4
- Release: 3 August 2000 – 5 March 2002
- Network: BBC Three (2003–2004); BBC One (2005–2006) (Note: Since 2007, there have been several special sketches broadcast on BBC One as part of various Comic Relief telethons.)
- Release: 9 February 2003 – 30 December 2006

Related
- Little Britain USA; Rock Profile Come Fly with Me

Little Britain is a British sketch comedy series that began as a radio show in 2000 and ran as a television series between 2003 and 2006. It was written and performed by David Walliams and Matt Lucas. Financed by the BBC, the radio series was first broadcast on BBC Radio 4, with the initial two television series premiering on BBC Three and the third and final series on BBC One.

The programme consists of sketches involving exaggerated parodies of British people from various walks of life. Each sketch was introduced by a voice-over narration (by Tom Baker) suggesting that the programme was a guide – aimed at non-British people – to British society. Despite the narrator's description of "great British institutions", the comedy arises from the British audience's self-deprecating understanding of themselves or people known to them. Recurring characters included Andy Pipkin who falsely presented himself as requiring the use of a wheelchair to gain the attention of his carer Lou Todd; Daffyd Thomas, who claims to be "the only gay in the village" despite much evidence to the contrary; and Vicky Pollard, presented as a working-class "chav" engaging in anti-social behaviour.

The programme's title was inspired by both Great Britain and the phrase Little Englander, referring to narrow-mindedness and complacent insularity. It is also the name of a London street described by Washington Irving as "a stronghold of true John Bullism". The radio show was trailed as "exploring British life in Britain as it is lived by Britons today in Britain". It spawned a live show, which toured internationally between 2005 and 2007, various specials for the Comic Relief charity marathons, and the HBO-produced Little Britain USA spin-off in 2008. Walliams and Lucas followed Little Britain with another sketch show, Come Fly with Me.

The series was popular and received high viewing figures, receiving 9.5 million viewers following its move to BBC One in 2005. Despite the series's popularity, commentators expressed concern on the impact that the show had on the large numbers of children who watched it, despite being aired after the watershed and on the heavy use of toilet humour, particularly in the second and third series. Criticism was also raised regarding the perceived derogatory manner in which Little Britain depicted racial and ethnic minority groups. In 2017, Lucas stated that he had agreed with the latter criticism. In June 2020, the show was pulled from various UK streaming services due to its use of blackface. In March 2022, the BBC made Little Britain available to view on BBC iPlayer again, with some of the more controversial characters being cut from the original release. It was subsequently removed again following the publication of allegations of sexual misconduct by Walliams in November 2026.

== History ==
=== Radio show ===
Little Britain initially appeared as a radio show produced by Edward Flinn, which ran on BBC Radio 4 from 2000 until 2002.

Radio 4 began a rerun of all nine episodes in February 2004 (which were slightly edited for content to suit the 6:30 pm timeslot). Unusually, this overlapped with a rerun, beginning in mid-March, of the first five programmes on the digital radio channel BBC 7. In June–July 2004, BBC 7 broadcast the remaining four.

It was announced in October 2019 that the series would return for a one-off radio special, titled Little Brexit, on BBC Radio 4 on 31 October 2019.

=== Television series ===
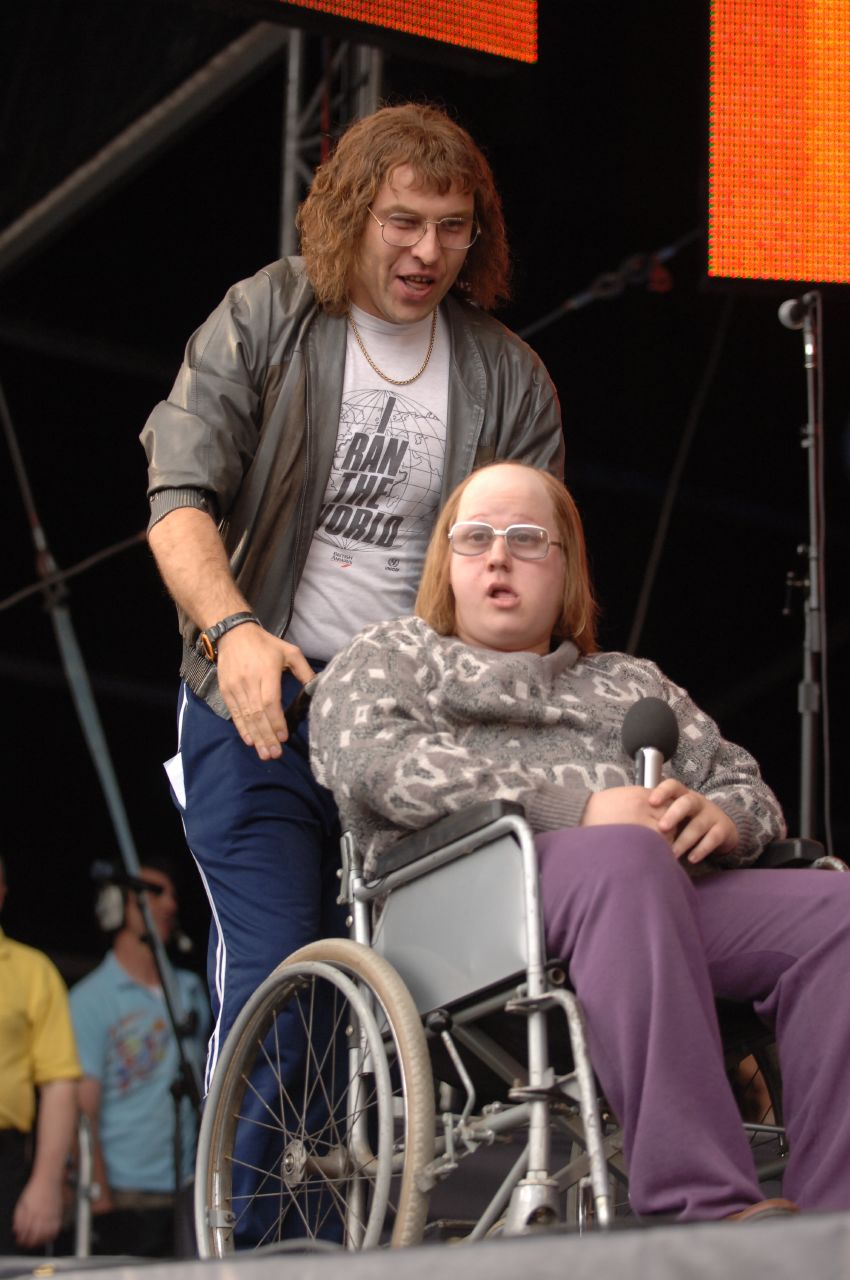
Lou Todd and Andy Pipkin, recurring characters in the series

Like several other BBC comedies (such as Dead Ringers and The Mighty Boosh), Little Britain made the transition from radio to television. All the episodes for the series were filmed at Pinewood Studios. Much of the TV material was adapted from the radio version but with more emphasis on recurring characters and catchphrases.

Series One, 2003

The first TV series was one of the new programmes in the launch line-up for digital channel BBC Three, the replacement for BBC Choice, which launched in February 2003. As a result of its success, the first series was repeated on the more widely available BBC Two. Although reactions were mixed, many critics were enthusiastic, and the programme was commissioned for another run. Part of the series was filmed at Herne Bay in Kent: Emily Howard the Lady, and the Lou and Andy sketches. Every episode of the series ended with a failed world record attempt.

Series Two, 2004

The second series, featuring several new characters, began on BBC Three on 19 October 2004. Its continued popularity meant the repeats moved to BBC One, starting 3 December 2004. The episodes were edited for their BBC One run to remove any material that might have been too offensive for the more mainstream BBC One audience. Every episode of this series ended with a Lou and Andy sketch.

Series Three, 2005

A third series began on 17 November 2005, for the first time on BBC One rather than BBC Three, and ended six weeks later. After its transmission, it was unclear whether there would be another, as many sketches were given dramatic twists and "wrapped up" (see individual character articles for more information). Lucas and Walliams were reportedly in talks for a fourth series with the BBC. Furthermore, they admitted in an interview they preferred to "kill off" certain characters to make way for new ones. Again, Lou and Andy appeared in the last sketch at the end of each episode, bar one.

Little, Little Britain, 2005

In 2005, to raise money for Comic Relief, Walliams and Lucas made a special edition of the show, dubbed Little, Little Britain. The episode included a variety of sketches with celebrities, including George Michael, Robbie Williams and Sir Elton John. This was released on a limited edition DVD and was released in the United States as Little, Little Britain on the Region 1 version of the Little Britain: Series 2 DVD.

Little Britain Abroad, 2006

In 2006, a two-part Christmas special was released, in which characters from the programme were depicted as visiting other countries.

=== Little Britain Live ===
As a success of the television series, Lucas and Walliams created a travelling stage show based on their series.

Comic Relief Does Little Britain Live, 2007

A special live version featuring appearances from celebrities such as Russell Brand and Dennis Waterman was filmed in 2006 and appeared on 2007's Comic Relief show.

=== Little Britain USA ===
In 2007, Lucas and Walliams announced that there would be no more of the British Little Britain, but they taped an American continuation of the programme entitled Little Britain USA, which featured both returning characters from the British series and new American characters. According to Walliams, the new show was "effectively Little Britain series four". The show debuted on HBO at 10:30 pm EST Sunday 28 September 2008, then the following week on BBC One in Britain. It also started airing on The Comedy Network in Canada in January 2010.

=== Specials ===
==== Little Britain Comic Relief Special, 2005 ====
This was the first Little Britain Comic Relief special, with the usual cast and guest appearances from George Michael, Elton John, and Robbie Williams.

==== Comic Relief Does Little Britain Live, 2007 ====
The Little Britain cast returned for a second Comic Relief Special, this time live and with special guests: Russell Brand, Kate Moss, Patsy Kensit, Jonathan Ross, Kate Thornton, Chris Moyles, Dennis Waterman, Peter Kay, David Baddiel, Jeremy Edwards, and Dawn French.

==== Little Britain Comic Relief Special, 2009 ====
A crossover between the UK and USA versions, this featured guest appearances by Catherine Tate and Robbie Williams.

==== Little Britain Comic Relief Sketch, 2015 ====
Walliams reprises the role of Lou Todd for Comic Relief. Guest stars included Stephen Hawking and Catherine Tate. However, Lucas does not feature.

==== Little Britain Does Sport Relief, 2016 ====
This featured Walliams reprising the role of Emily Howard. Lucas did not feature.

==== Little Brexit, 2019 ====
This one-off special was broadcast on 31 October 2019 on BBC Radio 4. The concept was created due to Brexit, the UK's withdrawal from the EU. Lucas and Walliams both returned for this episode.

==== The Big Night In, 2020 ====
The concept was revived for The Big Night In, a 23 April 2020 telethon held during the COVID-19 pandemic, in a skit which had the pair revisiting several characters. Social distancing requirements meant that they appeared in separate video feeds from their own homes, and used improvised costumes.

== Cast and characters ==
As a sketch show, Little Britain features many characters with varying degrees of costume and makeup. Matt Lucas and David Walliams play all the main characters in the show. Tom Baker narrates and Paul Putner, Steve Furst, Sally Rogers and Stirling Gallacher regularly appear as several different characters.

Other regular cast members include Anthony Head as the Prime Minister, Ruth Jones as Myfanwy, and Joann Condon as Pat.

== Broadcast ==
A two-part Christmas special, Little Britain Abroad, was broadcast in December 2006 and January 2007, bringing the total number of episodes to 25. There was also the Little Britain Live show.

In the UK, the series was originally broadcast on BBC Three and BBC One and was aired in repeats on Dave, Gold, and Watch. In the US and Bermuda, the series airs on BBC America. BBC Canada has aired the program from 3 March 2005 to present. UKTV broadcasts the programme in Australia and New Zealand. Comedy Central India broadcast the programme for Indian audiences.

=== Radio ===
Series	Episodes	Originally released	
Series	Episodes	First released	Last released
Pilot		3 August 2000	
1	4	6 March 2001	27 March 2001
2	4	12 February 2002	5 March 2002
Comic Relief Special		31 October 2019	

=== Television ===
Series	Episodes	Originally released	
Series	Episodes	First released	Last released
Pilot		9 February 2003	
1	8	16 September 2003	4 November 2003
2	6	19 October 2004	23 November 2004
3	6	17 November 2005	24 December 2005
LBA	2	25 December 2006	30 December 2006

== Criticism ==
The programme, most notably the second and third series, has been criticised for its negative treatment of racial and ethnic minority groups and its "punch-down" comedic style. Fellow comedian Victoria Wood said that while the sketches amused her, she found them to be "very misogynistic". In 2005, Fergus Sheppard wrote in The Scotsman:

The latest series of the hit BBC comedy Little Britain may be hauling in record viewing figures, but it has also sparked a previously unthinkable chorus of criticism, with claims that the programme had lost its way, trading early ingenuity for swelling amounts of toilet humour in the search for cheap laughs, and becoming increasingly offensive.

The Guardian columnist Owen Jones argued in his book Chavs: The Demonization of the Working Class that Vicky Pollard, a recurring character seen in Little Britain helped to perpetuate unkind stereotypes about working-class people, exacerbated by the fact that both Walliams and Lucas attended public school.

The series became increasingly popular with children, despite being shown after the watershed. There was also criticism from teachers, educators and members of staff that the programme led to inappropriate copycat behaviour in class and in the playground.

While getting more positive reviews during its airing time, the show also received a much more negative retrospective critical reception, especially concerning its depiction of minorities and vulnerable groups. In a 2018 Vice article titled "'Little Britain' Has Not Aged Very Well", Angus Harrison wrote, "What's staggering re-watching Little Britain now is that it only punched down. And it punched down relentlessly, over and over again, in much more brutal fashion than the worst of the 1970s' now blacklisted comedies ever did. [...] The writing process for every sketch seems to have been spinning a wheel of misfortune, landing on a vulnerable subject from the most disadvantaged rung of British society and turning them into a cartoon character. It was a point and laugh job, nothing more."

Speaking in October 2017, Lucas stated that if he were to remake Little Britain he would avoid making jokes about transgender people and would not play the role of a black character, saying, "Basically, I wouldn't make that show now. It would upset people. We made a more cruel kind of comedy than I'd do now... Society has moved on a lot since then and my own views have evolved". He defended decisions that were taken at the time, and explained that he and Walliams deliberately sought to play a very diverse group of people. The pair went on to reproduce some of the characters on the BBC's The Big Night In during the 2020 pandemic where they acknowledged in character that they would not play the characters again.

In June 2020, Little Britain was pulled from BBC iPlayer, Netflix and BritBox, alongside Come Fly with Me, for its use of blackface. A spokesperson for the BBC said: "There's a lot of historical programming available on BBC iPlayer, which we regularly review." On its decision to remove the shows, BritBox added: "Times have changed since Little Britain first aired, so it is not currently available on BritBox." Speaking shortly after the removal, Lucas and Walliams apologised again, saying: "Once again we want to make it clear that it was wrong and we are very sorry."

In March 2022, Little Britain was restored to BBC iPlayer after scenes containing the use of blackface, such as the characters of Ting Tong and Desiree DeVere were removed and a content warning included. In a statement, the BBC said "Little Britain has been made available to fans on BBC iPlayer following edits made to the series by Matt and David that better reflect the changes in the cultural landscape over the last 20 years since the show was first made." In November 2026, the BBC removed the show from its platforms after allegations of inappropriate sexual conduct were made against David Walliams.

== Spin-offs and merchandise ==
"I'm Gay", the song that Matt Lucas's character Daffyd Thomas sang at the end of the Little Britain Live shows, was released as a CD single in Australia in March 2007 and reached number 66 on the ARIA Singles Chart.

Matt Lucas and Peter Kay, in the guise of their characters Andy Pipkin and Brian Potter, re-recorded the song "I'm Gonna Be (500 Miles)" with its creators, The Proclaimers. This version was released as a charity single for Comic Relief on 19 March 2007.

Little Britain: The Video Game was released in February 2007. It featured a variety of characters in mini-games and received very negative reviews, being referred to by some as one of the worst games ever made.

The Russian series Nasha Russia and Ukrainian Fajna Jukrajna are inspired by Little Britain.

In 2010, characters returned for Nationwide Building Society adverts, including Lou and Andy, Vicky Pollard and Eddie (Emily) Howard.

== Little Britain Productions ==
Little Britain Productions is a production company set up by Lucas and Walliams to produce their future television projects, such as Come Fly with Me and The One....

== Home media ==
=== VHS ===
On 11 October 2004, Little Britain The Complete First Series was released on VHS.

VHS video title	Year of release/Cat No. (Single Video)	Episodes	BBFC rating
The Complete First Series	11 October 2004 (BBCV 7577)	Bath of Beans, Tallest Man, Hard-Boiled Egg Eating, Most Cigarettes in a Mouth, Biggest House of Cards, Smallest Ant, Largest Mince Pie, and Most People in a Mini	15

=== DVD ===
Title	Discs	Release date		
Title	Discs	Region 1	Region 2	Region 4
The Complete First Series	2	16 August 2005	11 October 2004	10 November 2004
The Complete Second Series	2	23 May 2006	10 October 2005	3 November 2005
Series One & Two	4	—N/a	14 November 2005	—N/a
The Complete Third Series	2	14 November 2006	11 September 2006	5 October 2006
The Comic Relief Special	1	—N/a	6 November 2006	—N/a
Series One to Three	6	—N/a	13 November 2006	—N/a
Live	1	20 November 2007	13 November 2006	6 December 2006
Abroad	1	20 November 2007	19 November 2007	7 November 2007
The Complete Collection	8	20 November 2007	19 November 2007	5 December 2007
USA Series 1	2	13 January 2009	24 November 2008	29 July 2009
Comic Relief Does Little Britain Live	1	—N/a	26 May 2010	—N/a

== See also ==
- List of fictional prime ministers of the United Kingdom
