= Lou and Andy =

Fictional characters

Lou Todd & Andy Pipkin
- Little Britain character
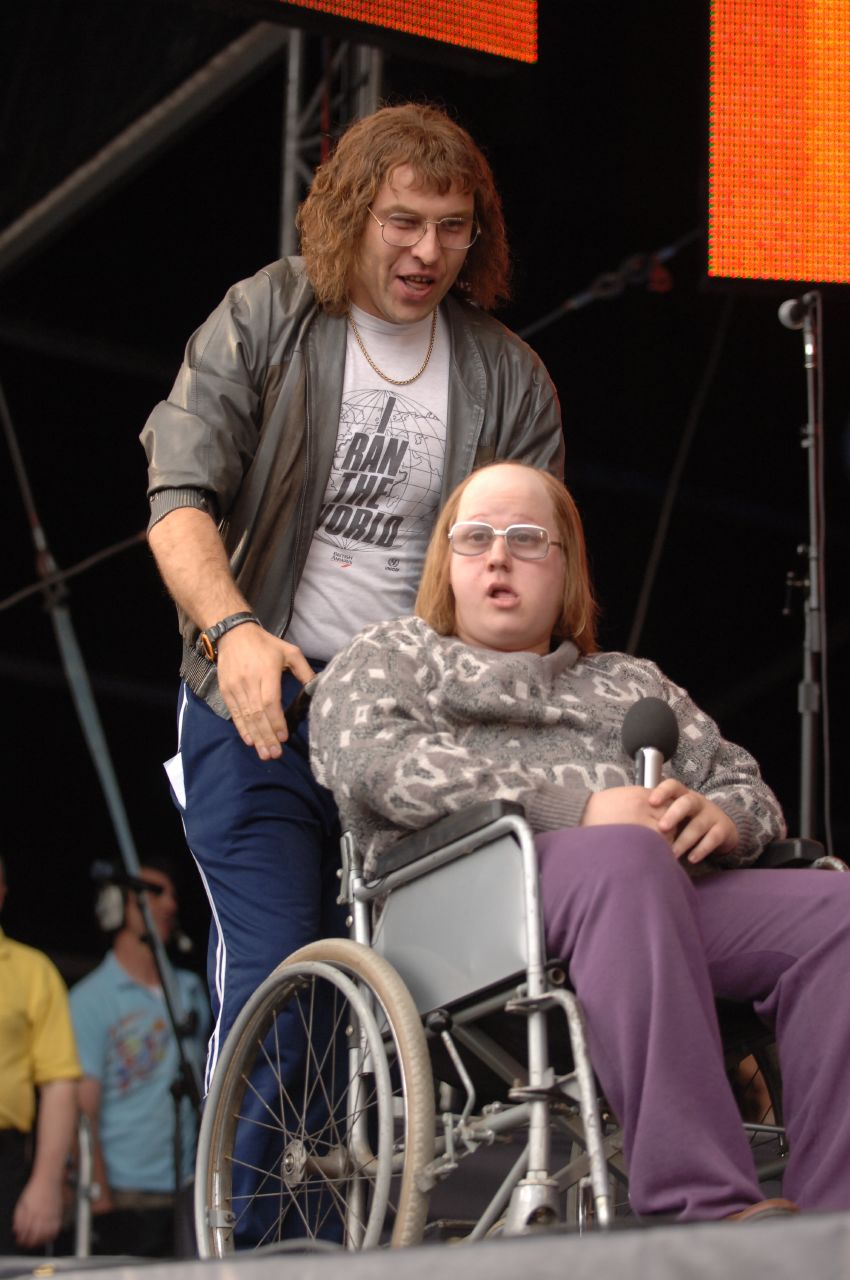
- Created by: David Walliams / Matt Lucas
- Portrayed by: Lou: David Walliams; Andy: Matt Lucas

In-universe information
- Family: Lou: Unnamed father Unnamed mother (deceased); Andy: Declan (brother)
- Nationality: British

Lou Todd and Andy Pipkin are fictional characters from the BBC sketch comedy series Little Britain, played by David Walliams and Matt Lucas respectively. Andy's catchphrases include, "Yeah I know", "(I) Want that one" and "(I) Don't like it", while Lou's catchphrase is "What a kerfuffle!"

Lou is patient, friendly, charitable and incredibly tolerant. He is a full-time carer for his friend, Andy, who – unbeknownst to Lou – feigns the need for a wheelchair. Lou's fashion sense primarily encompasses the 1980s, which is apparent from his general attire. He is typically seen wearing an awkward juxtaposition of trainers, blue tracksuit trousers, a T-shirt with slogans such as "I ran the World" or "Frankie Says RELAX - Don't do it" and a 1970s-style leather jacket with the sleeves pushed up to near the elbow. He speaks with a slight Cockney accent, with a lisp.

Andy is impatient, selfish, has no respect for other sentient beings, appears to be unintelligent, has no interest in the world outside his local area, and is incredibly lazy. He is also dressed mostly in scruffy clothing such as well-worn jogging bottoms and a dirty vest. He speaks with a nasal, slurred voice. He has an unseen or unheard from brother called Declan, and previously had a woman called Maria, who died in one episode, as a caregiver before Lou. Lou mentioned her regularly in the early episodes of Series 1.

Lou and Andy are arguably the most iconic characters in Little Britain, as they have appeared in every episode except the pilot. They were never in the radio shows apart from the 2019 Brexit special, are on most of Little Britain's merchandise and DVD covers and are in most of their charity work. The characters were inspired by Walliams' and Lucas' portrayals of Lou Reed and Andy Warhol on their previous programme, Rock Profile.

== Andy's behaviour ==
=== Requests ===
Andy often asks Lou for unusual things, often demanding them over and over again, usually without even looking at whatever he is asking for. Lou will attempt to talk him out of it, but he is insistent ("Yeah, I know"). He then rejects the item after Lou honours the request. The request is often framed as "I want that one...", and the rejection as "I don't like it", but not always. For example, Andy asks to go to the expensive Royal Opera House for his birthday, but shouts "I don't like it!" once the performance has started.

In another episode, Andy asks if he can wear a Smurf costume to dinner at a "smart restaurant" (Lou's words) but once he is there, wearing a smurf hat and painted completely blue. Andy declares that he "looks a pillock", and asks the waiter "Do you do crisps?". Toilet humour is also a staple of Little Britain's comedy: in one episode, Andy refuses to go to the toilet before getting into Lou's van, after having drunk four pints of beer in a pub, but needs to go as soon as he is in the van.

One of Andy's most expensive demands for Lou is: "I wanna go to Helsinki". Despite Lou's suggestions for other preferable destinations and Andy's previous statement of not liking Finland, Lou books the holiday, but in the next scene we see the plane taking off with Andy's voice over declaring "I want to go to Florida". In the Comic Relief special, Andy requested for George Michael to come to his birthday lunch, but then refused him when he came.

Andys's requests in deleted scenes include:

- To have lots of boiled rice, pilau rice, lemon rice, and coconut rice from an Indian takeaway. As soon as Lou puts all the rice on the plate Andy says "I don't like rice". Lou then proceeds to hit his head against the wall, out of Andy's sight in annoyance. (Series 3 deleted scene)
- To have a tattoo on his face of a spider web. Once the tattooist is finished Andy says "I regret it deeply", instead of "I don't like it". (Series 3 deleted scene)
- To have sex with a Portuguese prostitute in a motel in Phoenix, and then refusing to have anything to do with her. (Little Britain USA deleted scene)

=== Apparent opinions ===
These opinions are usually voiced by Lou as if Andy had said them previously. The comedy arises from the fact that the statement is usually very wise and profound and paints Andy as eloquent and educated off screen, in strong contrast to his ungrammatical speech and apparent lack of intelligence in the sketches. For example: "dark chocolate has a bitter edge to it and lacks the oral ecstasy of its milkier cousin"; "Finland has a maudlin quality to it, rendering it unsuitable as a holiday destination"; "violence is the last bastion of moral cowardice"; "the natural world has a sublime beauty, unrivalled by anything man-made"; "the French can never be forgiven for surrendering to the German war machine and collaborating with their occupiers to set up the Vichy government"; "the only way to see London is via its ancient waterway, which is like a pulsating artery through the heart of this historic city"; and "the sea is a dark and brutal force that has dragged many an innocent to a watery grave".

Andy's statements in deleted scenes include:

- Society is a complex web of inter-reliant structures, requiring universal acceptance and co-operative values. This raises the level of social capital, ultimately enhancing everybody's lives.
- Tattoos are a debasement of the human body, and were nothing more than graffiti over God's handiwork.
- He hates McFly despite Lou reminding him that they came and visited him when he was in hospital with a broken thumb.
- He's not fond of Raphael's religious paintings, despite Lou reminding him that although he admired his Roman period of secular portraiture, it was his work in the early 16th century – while displaying an occasional sentimental naivety – that represented the apotheosis of his artistic achievements.

=== Activity out of his wheelchair ===
Another recurring aspect of the sketches is that Andy often gets out of his wheelchair and performs complex actions while Lou's back is turned. There are several different types of behaviour. The behaviour may include the wheelchair itself, such as when he got out of the new wheelchair Lou bought him, tipped it over and got back into his old one. Another more unusual example is when he tipped his wheelchair over and lay on the ground to make it appear as if Lou's new Polish girlfriend had pushed him. Lou reacts angrily ("you evil Pole!"), this being the first time Lou actually exhibited anger in the series.

Andy's behaviour is sometimes directed towards other wheelchair users. In one episode he pushed a date he didn't like, because she was also in a wheelchair, down some steps. Typically, Andy's behaviour is rather mundane, such as pulling his trousers up by himself or going to the toilet. Occasionally, though, his actions are rather extreme, such as when he went skinny-dipping in a shark-filled tank or when he water-skied behind a Thames cruise boat. A more graphic scene ensued in Little Britain USA when Andy attempted to pet a lion in the zoo but had his left hand chewed off as a result. In the next episode he has both of his hands again. A sketch in Little Britain USA shows Andy on CCTV stealing a toy car ride, which Lou sees. This is the first time Lou has actually seen Andy out of his wheelchair, although Andy is saved because the accompanied police ID sketch showed an African-American suspect, which fools Lou.

In the first of the 2006 Christmas specials Little Britain Abroad Andy and Lou are aboard a plane taking them to Florida when the pilots invite them into the cockpit, but Andy switches off the engines causing the plane to crash and killing all on board except Lou and Andy. He also stood up later in the film to walk up the beach.

In the second Christmas special, a more extreme example of Andy's behaviour is witnessed by the viewers when he is stranded on a "desert island" with Lou. Whilst Lou searches for food to survive on until they find rescue, Andy finds and apparently checks into a nearby hotel where, among other things, he helps himself to food from the buffet table, participates in a Limbo competition, plays tennis, takes scuba diving lessons then returns to his shelter with a cocktail. When he boasts to Lou about what he's done at the hotel, Lou does not suspect anything, but merely believes Andy's suffering hallucinations.

Deleted scenes include:

- Got up and hit a man over the head with chicken who flattened Lou in a Judo class while Lou was polishing his glasses. This is one of the few occasions that he has indicated he views Lou as a friend rather than a slave.
- Stolen the donations to a harvest festival while they were all praying in the church. He had previously requested one of the donations, which Lou had tried to talk him out of taking.
- Altered a Raphael painting (Madonna del Granduca) to make it look like himself and Lou while Lou is asking a painting gallery assistant where he might find paintings Andy would enjoy.

=== Antisocial behaviour ===
Andy's behaviour is often antisocial. For example, he steals an ice cream from a child when Lou is talking to the child's mother and he sneezes into his hands then wipes them on a woman's legs. In another episode Andy causes Lou to crash his car into another car by just repeating "Fine!" even when Lou has already hit the other car. The behaviour is often entirely incongruous to the situation, for example, singing the opening song to The Flintstones while attending church.

This antisocial behaviour is often tied in with his getting out of the wheelchair. In one scene he shouts "Faster! Faster!" while Lou is travelling at 80 mph in order to get home in time for a TV programme; when they are stopped by the police Andy steals the policeman's motorbike and rides off. In Little Britain USA, Andy steals an old woman's mobility scooter. In one scene, Andy grabs a woman's breast while she is talking to Lou. During the Little Britain Abroad series, Andy blows a long raspberry as a message to fellow passengers on a 'plane taking them to Florida, after the captain allows him an opportunity to make an announcement to the cabin.

A particularly notable example involves Andy playing the picture game "You Say We Pay" on the TV programme Richard & Judy after Lou finally manages to get through the 'phone queue. He then ignores the hosts' instructions by literally naming the items shown when the aim of the game is to describe the item shown behind the hosts, who are facing the camera. If they correctly guess what you are describing you get £1,000. Most people win around £6,000. The hosts of the game show then state that he is the only player not to have won anything on the show. He then continues to name things during a commercial break.

Deleted scenes include:

- Stealing food from the church's Harvest hamper while everyone is praying.
- Deliberately dropping sweet wrappers in the National Gallery, London, as well as altering a Raphael painting.

== Andy's other carers ==
In the episodes of series 1, Lou regularly mentioned an unheard and unseen character called Maria, who was his predecessor as Andy's caregiver. Unfortunately, she became too ill to care for Andy, and was taken to a hospital. She later died in the episode which shows Lou and Andy getting prepared for the funeral.

In the final episode of series 3, Lou's mother had died, so Lou had to return to his father's house in the Isle of Wight in order to take care of him and arrange the funeral. As a replacement, Social Services sent Andy the strict, devoutly religious Irish woman Mrs. Mead (Imelda Staunton), who got Andy to clean the flat (stating it was a pigsty). Further ruining Andy's lifestyle, she disabled his television, threw out his chocolate and crisps (replacing his dinner with stew as a main course and a pear as dessert); started holding church services straight after dinner; and thumping his leg with a candle holder, to Andy's dismay. Andy claims he is unable to feel a thing when Mrs. Mead thumps it, but when she goes to the kitchen, he cries out from the pain he was enduring.

Later in the episode, Mrs. Mead takes Andy to Beachy Head, where she says he must learn how to move his wheelchair himself, as well as get a job. With her facing the sea, Andy gets out of his chair and pushes Mrs. Mead off the cliff, killing her. Andy then gets back in his wheelchair, turns round, and begins to wheel himself home.

After the end credits have rolled, Andy hears Lou returning home. Andy grins, then jumps out of his wheelchair to greet him, but then runs back to his chair, realising his mistake.

== On-screen intelligence ==
The series 3 deleted scenes show Andy starting to display his intelligent side on screen:

- After getting a tattoo, Andy says "I regret it deeply", instead of his usual "I don't like it".
- On two occasions, upon being reminded by Lou of one of his pithy off-screen aphorisms, Andy replies "Stop repeatin' everything I say!" or "Stop paraphrasin' me!"

== Scenes for charity ==
In a Comic Relief special in 2005, Lou asks who Andy would like to invite for his forthcoming birthday, with Andy asking for George Michael. After the usual discussion about the possibility of fulfilling Andy's weird wishes, Lou manages to get George to the restaurant where he invited Andy to. Andy, as always, behaves very impolitely, so Lou wants to excuse his behaviour. Before George leaves the restaurant, Andy says: "Tell him that 'Jesus to a Child' aside, I find his output emotionally vapid."

In December 2005, Lou and Andy presented a programme for Comic Relief. This featured Andy asking to open his Christmas presents early, so Lou let him open one. It was a two-piece Balamory jigsaw puzzle which Andy claimed he could not do, so threw it away. He then gave Lou his Christmas present ... a packet of cigars. Only when Lou tells Andy he doesn't smoke, Andy replies with "Yeah I know, there's none in anyway."

Later, Andy, after watching Rachel Stevens and Rowan Atkinson in a spoof of Spiderman, claims that he wants to touch Rachel Stevens's breasts saying that, since he is in a wheelchair, it could be arranged.

Andy later begs Lou for chocolate from the Christmas tree. Andy threatens to tell Social Services that Lou had beat him, so Lou relents, and gets a chocolate. Later he wants another one, so gets out of his wheelchair (while Lou is oblivious), and can't reach the last chocolate on the top of the tree. Andy cuts the top off the tree to get the chocolate. When he sits down in his wheelchair, Andy asks Lou to open it, much to the surprise of Lou.

Also, after watching a short film about poor children, Lou is very moved and sad from the film, but Andy remarks that it was boring.

As part of Red Nose Day 2007 Andy and Lou appeared alongside Brian Potter from Phoenix Nights and the Proclaimers in a special version of "I'm Gonna Be (500 Miles)". The video was later released as a fund raising single for Comic Relief. This reached the number one spot in the UK singles charts and was on Now 66.

For Comic Relief 2015, Lou appeared with Stephen Hawking in the Andy role, along with Catherine Tate as a nun.

== In popular culture ==
- A Dead Ringers sketch in the programme's 2005 election special features a parody of Lou and Andy, with the two replaced by Tony Blair and Gordon Brown respectively. The sketch depicts Brown, in a wheelchair, agreeing to read a speech praising Blair that the latter wrote, but jumping from the wheelchair as soon as Blair had left and reading instead "Blair stinks. Blair is crap. You all know it. Brown for Labour, Brown for Britain, Brown for Prime Minister!" to the House of Commons.
- Lou and Andy both appeared in an episode of Neighbours titled "British Bulldog", broadcast in the UK on 6 September 2007 and 14 June 2007 in Australia. They had no dialogue but were seen in the background of the scene, Lou talking to Harold Bishop, most likely asking him for directions, while Andy, unseen by Lou, played on the arcade racing game and returned to his seat before Lou turned around and helped Andy out of the bar. The next episode shows that the high score on the arcade racing game has been knocked off. However, this was later revealed to be because of Rosetta Cammeniti, and not Andy.

== Criticism ==
The sketches featuring the characters have been criticised for suggesting disabled people may be faking their conditions. The shows producers deny this, claiming they were satirising "do gooders" who treat disabled people as flawless.
