= Samuel Abrahams =

English film director

Samuel Abrahams is a BAFTA nominated English film director who has written and directed across drama, documentary and commercials.

Abrahams' debut feature film Lady, starring Sian Clifford, Laurie Kynaston, Juliet Cowan and Olisa Odele, had its World Premiere at the 69th BFI London Film Festival. Peter Bradshaw for The Guardian awarded Lady four stars, describing the film as "a scuzzier, shroomier B-side to Saltburn". In addition to praising Clifford's "overwhelming firepower of performance", Bradshaw states that the film delivered "laughs and unexpected tenderness" as well as being an "outrageous barnstormer”. Lady had its International Premiere at the 29th Tallinn Black Nights Film Festival in the First Feature Competition, where Abrahams won Best Director.

Abrahams' 2010 short film Connect starring Tuppence Middleton, described by The Guardian as "a bittersweet, elongated moment of romance on a bus, interspersed with a deliciously dark sense of humour" won the Jury Award at Encounters Short Film and Animation Festival and was nominated for a BAFTA for Best Short Film at the 64th British Academy Film Awards.

Samuel's 2011 short film Hold On Me, noted for its original use of dance, premiered at the BFI London Film Festival, won Best Short Film at the London Independent Film Festival, and was nominated for Fujifilm Shorts 2012 for its 35mm cinematography by director of photography Urszula Pontikos. Its visuals have been praised as being, "sumptuous yet intimate, textured and brimming with raw emotion."

In 2009, he directed the Channel 4 Comedy Lab, Hung Out which he co-wrote with a group of friends, loosely based on their lives.

He directed the split screen WWF commercial, The World Is Where We Live and has also directed commercials for brands such as British Airways, Tourism Ireland, and Match.com.
