= Video Killed the Radio Star (film) =

British horror film

- Directed by: Brad Watson
- Screenplay by: Ben Charles Edwards; Kirsty Bell
- Produced by: Ben Charles Edwards; Kirsty Bell
- Starring: Luke Brandon Field; Harriet Cains
- Production company: Dreamtown
- Country: United Kingdom
- Language: English

Video Killed The Radio Star is an upcoming British horror film directed by Brad Watson.

== Premise ==
A Radio DJ in 1979 battles with a demon live on air.

== Cast ==
- Luke Brandon Field
- Harriet Cains

== Production ==
The film is directed by Brad Watson from a screenplay by Ben Charles Edwards and Kirsty Bell and production from Dreamtown. The cast is led by Harriet Cains and Luke Brandon Field.

Principal photography took place in London in July 2024.
