= Savage Flowers =

- Screambox streaming poster
- Directed by: Brad Watson
- Written by: Ben Charles Edwards; Dominic Wells
- Produced by: Kirsty Bell; Ben Charles Edwards
- Cinematography: Dennis Madden
- Edited by: Brad Watson
- Music by: Zeina Nasr; Stefan Smith
- Release date: 7 May 2025 (CIFF)
- Country: United Kingdom
- Language: English

Savage Flowers is a 2025 British thriller film by Dreamtown, directed by Brad Watson from a screenplay by Ben Charles Edwards and Dominic Wells. It premiered at the inaugural Cine International Film Festival (CIFF).

== Cast ==
- Roxanne McKee as Lucy
- Nick Moran as Pa
- Meesha Garbett as Ada
- Olivia-Mai Barrett as Rose
  - Iona Bell as young Rose
- Luke Brandon Field as Jonah
- Joshua Wichard as Benjamin
- Connie Jenkins-Greig as Rebekah
- Victor Hugo as Sam
- Jack McEvoy as Simeon
- Romanie Jija-Wakeham as Iris
- Maddie Mills as Lily
  - Vivienne Rowland as young Lily

== Release ==
Savage Flowers opened the inaugural Cine International Film Festival (CIFF) on 7 May 2025 in Soho, London. The film will be released on Bloody Disgusting's Screambox streaming service in January 2026.
