= List of Doc Martin episodes =

First-run airings of the ITV medical dramedy

Doc Martin is a British television medical comedy drama series starring Martin Clunes in the title role of Dr Martin Ellingham. It was created by Dominic Minghella after the character of Dr Martin Bamford in the 2000 comedy film Saving Grace. The show is set in the fictional seaside village of Portwenn and filmed on location in the village of Port Isaac, Cornwall, England, with most interior scenes shot in a converted local barn.

Doc Martin first aired on ITV on 2 September 2004, with a first series of six episodes. The episode number for the second series increased to eight. This was followed by a TV film and a third series of seven episodes. The next six series aired eight episodes each. Throughout the series, the various characters almost never refer to or address him as "Dr Ellingham". Patients and some of his acquaintances usually just call him "Doc", and everyone else calls him Martin.

While it had been reported in 2017 that the series would end after series 9 in 2019, Martin Clunes clarified that it had been commissioned only as far as that year, thereby not ruling out future plans by the broadcaster. Immediately after airing the finale episode of series 9, ITV issued a terse publicity statement, "Goodbye, Doc! We'll miss you." However, in April 2020, director Nigel Cole confirmed that there would be a tenth series, which aired in 2022 and is the final series (see main article on Doc Martin).

During the course of the programme, 79 episodes of Doc Martin aired over ten series, between 2 September 2004 and 25 December 2022. This total counts the TV film as one episode.

== Series overview ==
Series	Episodes	Originally released		Avg. viewers (millions)
Series	Episodes	First released	Last released	Avg. viewers (millions)
1	6	2 September 2004	7 October 2004	9.32
2	8	10 November 2005	5 January 2006	8.68
TV Film		25 December 2006		5.88
3	7	24 September 2007	5 November 2007	9.12
4	8	20 September 2009	8 November 2009	9.15
5	8	12 September 2011	31 October 2011	10.60
6	8	2 September 2013	21 October 2013	8.97
7	8	7 September 2015	2 November 2015	7.61
8	8	20 September 2017	8 November 2017	7.41
9	8	25 September 2019	13 November 2019	7.10
10	9	7 September 2022	25 December 2022	5.42

== Episodes ==
=== Series 1 (2004) ===
Final Appearance of Lucy Punch as Elaine Denham

No. overall	No. in series	Title	Directed by	Written by	Original release date	UK viewers (millions)
1	1	"Going Bodmin"	Ben Bolt	Dominic Minghella	2 September 2004	9.93
Martin interviews for the post of general practitioner (GP) at Portwenn in Cornwall. Having unwittingly offended local teacher Louisa Glasson (Caroline Catz), he spontaneously diagnoses her glaucoma. Although pleased to renew his acquaintance with his Auntie Joan Norton (Stephanie Cole) with whom he spent holidays as a boy, he is less than enamoured of the other locals he encounters and the state of his predecessor's surgery. He also inadvertently uncovers an affair between a teenager and the wife of Colonel Gilbert Spencer (Richard Johnson), leading to threats of a divorce, a reconciliation and then a punch on his nose. Disillusioned, Martin decides he has made a mistake and plans to return to London. First appearances of Martin Clunes as Martin Ellingham, Caroline Catz as Louisa Glasson, Ian Ncneice as Bert Large, Joe Absolom as Al Large, Stephanie Cole as Joan Norton, Lucy Punch as Elaine Denham and Stewart Wright as Mark Mylow.
2	2	"Gentlemen Prefer"	Ben Bolt	Dominic Minghella	9 September 2004	8.98
Martin's surgery officially opens for business, but patients continue to treat it as a drop-in cafe. Former teacher Roger Fenn (Jeff Rawle) is hoarse and has a lump on his neck, so Martin refers him to a specialist for a biopsy. He is diagnosed with cancer and must have surgery which may cost the former singer his voice. Martin also sacks Elaine (Lucy Punch) as his receptionist for her general attitude and incompetence after she inaccurately takes down the name or phone number of a boy with suspected appendicitis.
3	3	"Sh*t Happens"	Ben Bolt	Dominic Minghella	16 September 2004	8.91
A stomach bug sweeps the village, filling Martin's surgery with patients. Martin appears on the local radio station in an attempt to alert the village to a potential health scare, but his efforts misfire. Bert Large (Ian McNeice) and his son Al (Joe Absolom) have an argument over college and the future of their family businesses. Martin and Bert believe the cause of the epidemic is the origins of the water supply.
4	4	"The Portwenn Effect"	Ben Bolt	Dominic Minghella	23 September 2004	9.31
Louisa buys two tickets to the Portwenn Players Dance and invites Martin. He does not want to go, so Louisa offers the ticket to PC Mark Mylow (Stewart Wright) instead. Peter Cronk (Kurtis O'Brien), a boy at Louisa's school, causes trouble on a wildlife trip and Martin meets Park Ranger Stewart James (Ben Miller), a military veteran with PTSD, who believes he lives with a 6-foot red squirrel named Anthony.
5	5	"Of All the Harbours in All the Towns"	Ben Bolt	Kirstie Falkous and John Regier	30 September 2004	9.45
John Slater (John Alderton), an old flame of Auntie Joan's, returns to the village hoping to rekindle his love affair with her, but Martin discovers he has a life-threatening heart condition. Fifteen-year-old Melanie Gibson (Stephanie Leonidas) has a crush on the doctor after he mends her dislocated shoulder.
6	6	"Haemophobia"	Ben Bolt	Dominic Minghella	7 October 2004	9.31
Martin is forced to confront his fear of blood, first when the town plays a prank on him involving ketchup as a fake injury. Peter Cronk ruptures his spleen, needing an urgent operation. Louisa accompanies the Doc and Peter to the hospital. After they hear Peter is out of the woods, they grab a taxi back to Port Wenn. Louisa tells Martin he is brilliant and they seal their attraction with a kiss – though Martin messes that up, too!

=== Series 2 (2005–2006) ===
No. overall	No. in series	Title	Directed by	Written by	Original release date	UK viewers (millions)
7	1	"Old Dogs"	Ben Bolt	Dominic Minghella and Edana Minghella	10 November 2005	8.86
Louisa's old flame, Danny Steel (Tristan Sturrock), comes to Portwenn hoping to rekindle their romance. He is furious with Martin for interfering with his mother's move to a nursing home. Martin orders a series of brain scans for injury-prone fisherman Eddie Rix (Gerard Horan). Elaine has resigned and moved away with her boyfriend Greg and has been replaced by her cousin, Pauline Lamb (Katherine Parkinson).
8	2	"In Loco"	Ben Bolt	Richard Stoneman	17 November 2005	8.19
Louisa is interviewed for a position as headmistress and crosses Martin by insisting that children with a highly contagious disease should still come to school against the doctor's wishes. Student Peter Cronk stays with Martin after his mother Joy Crock (Mary Woodvine) is hospitalised with serious burns from a deep fryer accident at her fish and chip shop. Bert Large steps in to run the shop for her, only to find his "experience in the catering trade" is a little wayward.
9	3	"Blood is Thicker"	Ben Bolt	Jack Lothian	24 November 2005	9.26
Al suspects that Bert is not his natural father, but after they look at Al's birth certificate, they see Bert listed as the father. Martin diagnoses food poisoning for a rural family with a mysterious unseen mother.
10	4	"Aromatherapy"	Ben Bolt	Dominic Minghella and Edana Minghella	1 December 2005	8.99
Vernon Cooke (Hugh Lloyd) is inexplicably emanating a horrible stench and consults Doctor Ellingham. Local radio host Caroline Bosman (Felicity Montagu) seems to have a serious drinking problem. Julie Mitchell (Angeline Ball) arrives in Portwenn and immediately catches the attention of PC Mark Mylow.
11	5	"Always on My Mind"	Ben Bolt	Richard Stoneman	8 December 2005	8.56
Martin examines Helen Pratt (Jean Trend), but she collapses and dies. Her husband, Phil (Roger Lloyd-Pack), is angry with the doctor and blames him for his wife's death. A feud develops between Phil and Helen's long-time friend, Martin's Aunt Joan, after Phil becomes convinced that Joan knew something secret about him. Joan encourages Martin to explain the circumstances of Helen's death to Phil, having previously been extremely cold and insensitive following her death. Pauline begins training to become a member of the lifeboat crew, flirting with her instructor, Ross (Finlay Robertson), in the process, causing Al to become jealous.
12	6	"The Family Way"	Ben Bolt	Dominic Minghella and Edana Minghella	15 December 2005	8.83
Martin's cold and difficult parents Margaret (Claire Bloom) and Christopher (John Woodvine) come to stay with him. He has not seen them for seven years, and is puzzled as to why they should turn up out of the blue. PC Mark Mylow and Julie Mitchell get engaged. Danny Steel's lung collapses whilst renovating a house and Martin examines a woman with what she claims is a thyroid problem, but the results turn out to be rather different.
13	7	"Out of the Woods"	Minkie Spiro	Jack Lothian	22 December 2005	8.11
Martin treats an emergency case of a youth who, along with his friends, was playing with stinger fish at the beach. PC Mark Mylow plans to spend his stag night sleeping rough in the woods with Al Large, but gets bitten by an adder. The doctor does not have a clue where they are and his only hope lies with the area's park ranger Stewart James.
14	8	"Erotomania"	Minkie Spiro	Dominic Minghella and Edana Minghella	5 January 2006	8.60
Martin tries to persuade Mrs. Tishell (Selina Cadell), the pharmacist, to remove her collar, which she has worn for years. Louisa breaks up with Danny after career disagreements, and she and Martin admit their feelings for each other. PC Mark Mylow has a physical exam in preparation for his marriage to Julie Mitchell (Angeline Ball), who is pregnant with what he believes to be his child. However, Julie lied to Mark about when she conceived, and threatens to sue Martin if he tells Mark about the date of conception. Martin tells Mark that one of his test results shows that he is infertile, so Julie's child cannot be his. A man from the Salvation Army arrives in Portwenn trying to trace a girl named Emma Lewis, who Mark is told by Martin is his girlfriend Julie. She admits to Mark that she was dating him only to cover her real identity.

=== TV film (2006) ===
No. overall	Title	Directed by	Written by	Original release date	UK viewers (millions)
15	"On the Edge"	Ben Bolt	Jack Lothian	25 December 2006	5.88
Martin learns that he is under investigation for rude and condescending behaviour with the end result that he may have to attend a 2-week course to improve his people skills. Pauline advises Martin that he will have to find a new receptionist, as she is returning to university to study nursing. Auntie Joan is accidentally shot in her foot by Colonel Gilbert Spencer, who is excited about the rare birds nesting in the cliffs above her home. Bert Large sees the nestings as a golden opportunity to run guided tours in a borrowed police van. Al Large, meanwhile, decides to strike out on his own as a plumber, to prove his worth to Pauline, whom he asks to move in with him. She discovers he forgot to mail her university application. Louisa's father Terry Glasson (Kenneth Cranham) suddenly re-appears in the village, accompanied by his friend, Jonathan Crosier (Chris O'Dowd). Terry had left the village under a cloud when he was accused of stealing money from the lifeboat fund, but he has always maintained his innocence and Louisa remains his staunchest defender. Things get serious when Jonathan stops taking his medication and hallucinates that his brain is receiving radio communications from an unknown source . He takes Martin, Louisa, Terry and Pauline prisoner, demanding Al pick up a shipment of explosives, so he and Terry can carry out a planned robbery. When Al and Martin rescue an injured bird egg thief from a cliff, Jonathan believes the eggs were transmitting the radio signals.

American PBS affiliates broadcast this in Part 1 and Part 2 episodes. In the Acorn Media compilation, "On the Edge" is included in the series 2 DVD, as part of that series' episodes.

=== Series 3 (2007) ===
No. overall	No. in series	Title	Directed by	Written by	Original release date	UK viewers (millions)
16	1	"The Apple Doesn't Fall" "Tick Tock"	Ben Bolt	Richard Stoneman	24 September 2007	8.10
Martin believes Louisa may be anaemic after she passes out in front of her class. Allison Lane's (Debbie Chazen) daughter Delph (Jaimee Colmer) is treated for hyperactivity, but the cause is later suspected to be her taking her Mum's diet pills. After the horror and shock of discovering his fiancée Julie's secret, Constable Mark Mylow has left — PC Joe Penhale (John Marquez) arrives in Portwenn to replace him, arousing attention from the doc, who discovers him unconscious at the wheel of his police car. Louisa becomes Martin's patient. Titled Tick Tock in American release.
17	2	"Movement" "The Morning After"	Ben Bolt	Nick Vivian	1 October 2007	8.58
Bert Large abandons his plumbing business in favour of running a restaurant, but neglects to get a licence for serving alcohol. Following the restaurant's opening, several cases of food poisoning occur with Louisa being one of the people affected. Poppy (Emily Head) fills in at the doc's office while Pauline takes a class for certification as Martin's lab assistant. Mandie (Daisy Head) sees the doc for a developmental crisis, which he handles with unusual tact. Mick Mabley (Joseph Morgan) becomes Bert's new chef. Titled The Morning After in American release.
18	3	"City Slickers" "Love Thy Neighbor"	Ben Bolt	Richard Stoneman	8 October 2007	8.84
Anthony (Karl Theobald) and Terri Oakwood (Amy Marston), and their undisciplined son Sam (James Cronin) who vandalizes vehicles, move in next door to Louisa causing problems for her, Martin and the local people. PC Penhale has developed agoraphobia. Lonely widow Mrs. Avirell (Eileen Essell) makes repeated visits to Martin's office for a habitual cough. Her cat TomTom has disappeared, and unbeknownst to her, has been sleeping with Sam. Both Sam and Mrs. Avirell are diagnosed with tuberculosis. Titled Love Thy Neighbor in American release.
19	4	"The Admirer" "The GP Always Rings Twice"	Ben Bolt	Jack Lothian	15 October 2007	8.81
Hotel owner Carrie Wilson (Louise Delamere) has her sights on Martin much to Louisa's chagrin. Martin later accidentally runs over and kills Wilson's dog with his car. Joan has an admirer in painter Edward Melville (Justin Salinger), who is 30 years younger than she. Martin walks in on them having sexual intercourse in her home. He and Joan later quarrel over his objections to the relationship. Melville later collapses at Wilson's hotel, diagnosed by Martin as having overdosed on medication prescribed for erectile dysfunction. Al Large returns after a lengthy trip to Africa, telling Martin he was robbed of all his possessions during his trip. Pauline finds Al collapsed on the floor of his apartment. Martin diagnoses him with sleeping sickness, the result of having been bitten by tsetse flies while in Africa. Titled The GP Always Rings Twice in American release.
20	5	"The Holly Bears a Prickle" "Breaking Up Is Hard To Do"	Ben Bolt	Ben Bolt	22 October 2007	9.21
Martin takes Pauline's mother Dawn (Denise Black) off all medication and prescribes a change in diet. Louisa and Martin attend a charity concert together, and when Louisa pulls him beneath a tree for a kiss, he ruins the moment by coldly diagnosing her gesture as mood swing behaviour. Louisa realizes they are going nowhere as a couple, and ends their relationship. Auntie Joan insists Martin can work at being a more understanding personality, but he insists he is unable to change and refuses to, " ... talk rubbish and smile all the time." Bert Large quits buying his produce from Auntie Joan, who believes they had a verbal contract. Pauline's gambling addiction finally comes to a head after she is so distracted that she mixes up patient records, and her scooter is repossessed. Al Large insists to Martin that Pauline fully paid for the scooter with her gambling winnings. After an explosive confrontation in Martin's office with Dawn over Pauline's using her credit card for her gambling, Martin orders her mother out of the office and insists Pauline get professional help with her addiction or be fired from his employ. He makes her return money that Al loaned her to get her scooter back. Louisa's friend Holly (Lucy Robinson) sustains a back injury walking with Louisa. While recuperating at Louisa's apartment, Martin pays a professional visit and awkwardly, following Auntie Joan's advice, tries to express sympathy for the patient. Martin and Louisa argue over his attempt as unfeeling lip service. Martin resuscitates Holly after she collapses on the floor, while Louisa watches in amazement and expresses her admiration for his skills. The episode ends with Martin proposing to Louisa, telling her he cannot imagine life without her. She immediately accepts his proposal. Titled Breaking Up Is Hard to Do in American release.
21	6	"Nowt So Queer" "The Two of Us"	Ben Bolt	Keith Temple	29 October 2007	9.92
Originally aired during the week of Halloween in 2007. The news of Martin and Louisa's engagement spreads like wildfire through Portwenn, and Bert Large asks to cater the wedding. Martin wants to be married in a church wedding. The divorced PC Joe Penhale offers his advice on handling women. Pauline asks to be a bridesmaid. A mysterious respiratory infection breaks out in the village. Martin becomes concerned about patient Beth Sawle (Thelma Barlow) who has a fungal infection in her lungs and lives with her domineering and sinister sister Janet (Irene Sutcliffe), a biochemist who concocts potions and pills in a basement laboratory. Pauline tells Martin that Janet is called "the Black Widow" and is alleged to have murdered her colleagues. Janet says she was fired from her position for, "a difference of opinion over procedure", and does not want Martin snooping around their home. Beth is brought into submission by Janet's controlling personality and threats of the consequences if she does not follow Janet's orders. Pharmacist Mrs Tishell, who is found passed out and slumped over her counter, is awakened by Martin and tells him that Beth has filled no prescriptions with her. When Martin delivers Beth's antibiotics medicine to her home, he and sister Janet, who has been growing mushrooms in her basement, have an argument about her overbearing interference in his medical care for Beth. After he leaves, Janet later takes away Beth's medicine, insisting that Beth take only her concoction brewed from her home-grown mushrooms. Beth invites the letter carrier Dave (Tony Maudsley) in for a cup of tea, and Janet berates Beth for doing so, hinting that she might have Beth put away in a hospital. Bert makes an office visit to Martin for a chronic cough, and says he feels like something has crawled into his ear. Dave later collapses in Martin's office, and Mick Mabley is found unconscious in Bert's restaurant kitchen. Martin tells PC Joe Penhale the epidemic has been caused by spores and fungus. Penhale compares the situation to Invasion of the Body Snatchers. Al Large is concerned about his finances, and his increasing cough spasms. Martin finds the pills Janet is forcing Beth to take, and goes to the basement lab of mushroom cultures and concoctions. He has an argument with Janet and accuses her of being the source of the illness outbreak in Portwenn, calling her a "spooky old bat". While making wedding plans at Bert's outdoor restaurant, Martin gives Louisa nasal strips to keep her from snoring next to him at night. Titled The Two of Us in American release
22	7	"Happily Ever After" "In Sickness and In Health"	Ben Bolt	Jack Lothian	5 November 2007	10.37
On the day of their wedding, Louisa's pregnant bridesmaid Isobel (Amanda Abbington) is hit in the eye with a party popper and has to wear an eye patch. The local florist gets arrested and his shop shuttered. Roger Fenn (Jeff Rawle) is set to give the bride away, and helps Martin select the hymns. Bert Large has to make contingency plans for catering the wedding, after the water pipes burst on the pavement. Martin suggests the vicar the Rev. Counter (David Ryall) has a drinking problem and later catches him with a bottle of whisky and tries to wrestle the bottle out of his hands. The vicar ends up in hospital after falling over and fracturing his hip. Martin asks neighbouring vicar Mr Porter (David Bamber) to be the replacement, even though Porter has become disillusioned and cynical about weddings. Martin pays a high price for his services, having to perform a medical procedure on Porter's pet pig. PC Joe Penhale breaks the door on the florist shop so Auntie Joan can get the flowers for the wedding. Bert and Al's catering tent collapses. Isobel goes into labour outdoors on a hill, and Martin delivers the baby daughter. Louisa and Martin decide not to get married, leaving everybody else waiting in the church. Titled In Sickness and In Health in American release.

=== Series 4 (2009) ===
No. overall	No. in series	Title	Directed by	Written by	Original release date	UK viewers (millions)
23	1	"Better the Devil"	Ben Bolt	Jack Lothian	20 September 2009	8.30
Following the cancellation of their impending nuptials, Louisa has left Portwenn, and Dr. Martin Ellingham takes stock of his life and career. He subsequently applies for a surgeon's position in London. Auntie Joan, accompanied by her neighbour's dog Buddy, drops a pie off for Martin and suggests her friend Barbara (Georgie Glen) can help him with his fear of blood. Much to Martin's annoyance, the dog follows him everywhere. Martin attends to a minor school emergency. Bert Large, who retains a 10% financial interest in the restaurant taken over by his son Al, visits Martin for a check-up. Bert asks Al to fix him up with a date. Bert's date is eager to have sex with him, but Bert wants a fuller relationship than just sexual encounters. Mrs. Tishell's hearing-impaired husband Clive (Malcolm Storry), presumed long-dead by Martin, returns. Barbara has a bicycle accident as she tries to avoid hitting Clive, who was unable to hear her coming up behind him. After Mrs. Tishell pokes him in the ear, drawing blood, he visits Martin, who tells him a specialist can perform an operation to recover his hearing. Martin's ex-girlfriend Dr. Edith Montgomery (Lia Williams) attends to Barbara, and immediately has a disagreement with Martin over the patient's need for an operation. Without clearing it with Montgomery, Martin orders an abdominal scan and saves Barbara from having unnecessary surgery. Pauline is driven to distraction and insomnia by her snoring brother, Adam (Luke Neal), who has moved in with her and sleeps on her sofa. (The closing credits faultily list Neal as having played "Andy"; there is no Andy in this episode.) Martin ascertains that the cause is scarring of the nasal septum after a perforation, which turns out to have been the work of Pauline with a lollipop-stick when Adam was five years old; surgery is not warranted, and Adam will have to live with the scar-tissue. Pauline and Al Large discuss her moving in with him. The episode ends with the return of Louisa and her surprise news: she is pregnant with Martin's child.
24	2	"Uneasy Lies the Head"	Ben Bolt	Ben Bolt	27 September 2009	8.03
When a pregnant Louisa shows up unannounced at Martin's flat, she sees Dr. Edith Montgomery sitting at the kitchen table. He suddenly finds himself struggling to deal with his expectant fatherhood, but Louisa is adamant she does not want Martin involved with the raising of their child. She applies for a job back at Portwenn Primary School, where her replacement headmaster Mr Strain (David Haig) is creating suspicion and public concern over his increasingly erratic behaviour. Strain is renting out Louisa's house, and he becomes convinced that she has returned to reclaim her old position at the school. At the hospital, Louisa ends up under the care of Dr. Montgomery, who is inquisitive about Louisa's motive for her re-appearance in Portwenn . At an awkward visit to Mrs. Tishell, who is snippy about the pregnancy, Louisa runs into Auntie Joan, who makes an offer for Louisa to move in with her. Joan offers to help raise the child, later rebuking Martin for his allowing Louisa to go through the pregnancy alone. Pauline casually mentions that she has seen Louisa, but Martin snaps at her and does not want to discuss the subject. He later has an argument with Louisa for not telling him about the pregnancy. Pauline's Uncle Jimmy (Roger Morlidge) and Aunt Jennie (Clara Salaman) visit Martin after Uncle Jimmy displays erratic public behaviour, owing to his taking excessive doses of a testosterone drug, to overcome what he fears are homosexual tendencies. Uncle Jimmy says he could live with being diagnosed as bi-sexual, just not homosexual. Strain has a visit with Martin, and when his urine sample is blue in colour, Martin realises the schoolmaster is unwell with porphyria, an enzyme deficiency that also afflicted George III. Things take a frightening turn when the schoolmaster takes his school's children to Roscarrock Cove, which has numerous hazardous tide pools. Pauline immediately alerts PC Penhale, who arrives to save the day after Strain pushes Louisa onto the rocks and tries to drown himself and Martin
25	3	"Perish Together as Fools"	Ben Bolt	Richard Stoneman	4 October 2009	8.71
Dr. Martin Ellingham is shocked to find Louisa and Auntie Joan knocking at his door before the surgery has opened. Louisa has had a medical scare and wants Martin's reassurance that everything is fine. He refers her to a clinic where she is assigned to Martin's ex-girlfriend Dr. Edith Montgomery. In order to determine if the fetus is normal size, Louisa must provide the last date she had sex with Martin. Louisa later visits the elderly Mr Routledge (Ewan Hooper), to see if he will be vacating his unit soon, but Martin had previously denied his request to certify his physical needs as qualified to move to a nursing home. Routledge later collapses on the floor while both Louisa and Martin are visiting him. PC Joe Penhale's artistic brother Sam (Martin Marquez) moves in with him. The clinic just having got a notice it is due for a mandatory interior paint job, Pauline hires Sam. When he collapses during the job, Sam is examined by Martin for symptoms of the hereditary Huntington's disease, causing Joe to worry that he also might also have inherited the disease. The medical test results come back negative for Huntington's. Sam is an art forger who collapses in Joe's home while mixing his own lead paint, causing Joe to believe his brother is manufacturing crack cocaine. Martin is called, and informs Joe that his brother is an art forger, not a drug dealer. Pauline loves Al Large, but has become bored with him and is considering a break-up. Al and his father Bert go to great lengths to convince her to keep Al.
26	4	"Driving Mr. McLynn"	Minkie Spiro	Richard Stoneman	11 October 2009	9.21
Louisa is now 7 months pregnant. Martin urges her to slow down after a dizzy spell, but is shocked to learn that Louisa has applied to be her school's headteacher again. Martin does not believe women are capable of balancing a job and raising children at the same time, and tries to discourage her, resulting in an ongoing feud between them. Sally Tadwick (Sara Weymouth) the school secretary has just returned from a vacation in Spain and visits Martin to ask for medication to treat an infection from her new tattoo. Mr. and Mrs. McLynn (Benjamin Whitrow, Phyllida Law) visit Martin to get medical verification for a disabled parking badge for Mr. McLynn, claiming the disability is recent enough to qualify under regulations. Martin refuses and checks with Mrs. Tishell to learn Mr. McLynn has been disabled for seven years. The McLynn's agree to pay for the damage when they crash into Auntie Joan's car, if the police are not informed. Mrs. McLynn has been losing her sight for years owing to macular degeneration, but she drives anyway, and later hits PC Penhale with her car. Al Large does a plumbing job for Louisa to earn enough money to surprise Pauline with a new scooter, resulting in his neglecting to show up for their date because he is working. A group of young girls see Al wringing out his wet tee shirt from Louisa's window, and Pauline overhears them giggling and gossipping that Al and Louisa are having an affair.
27	5	"The Departed"	Minkie Spiro	Jack Lothian	18 October 2009	9.49
Dr. Martin Ellingham is in London to meet Robert Dashwood (Nicholas Le Prevost), who is leading the selection process for the prestigious Imperial College London surgeon's job that Martin has applied for. Martin has misled Dashwood into believing he has finally conquered his debilitating blood phobia. Dr. Edith Montgomery later recommends him to the very youthful therapist Dr Milligan (Paul Ready) to help Martin overcome his blood fear. Martin attends one session and walks out calling it "psycho-analytical claptrap". On Martin's train trip home, Auntie Joan's neighbour Jim Selkirk (Dave Hill) is a fellow passenger seated next to Martin. When he becomes ill, Martin is simply annoyed, until the man dies en route. His widow Mrs. Selkirk (Gwen Taylor) believes she sees and talks to her husband, who keeps telling her to visit Martin. In Martin's office, she believes her husband is sitting next to her. At a visit to pharmacist Mrs. Tishell, she talks to her deceased husband. Joan finds Mrs. Selkirk lying in her sheep pen, where Martin diagnoses her as suffering from lyme disease. Meanwhile, Juliet and Richard Wenn (Sylvestra Le Touzel, Anthony Calf) sue Joan after she traps their highly troublesome child Theo (Andrew Byrne) in her chicken coop. Theo was rescued by Louisa as he screamed for help. Auntie Joan later overhears Burt and Al Large making fun of her as a dangerous woman affected by "the wind on the moors". Theo subsequently develops a mysterious malaise, becoming ill in the classroom. Martin pays a house visit to the Wenn home and sends a medical sample from Theo to the labs. PC Penhale is required to make an official investigation. Subsequent medical reports clear Joan of any blame for Theo's condition, saying the report results confirm that the child is afflicted with amoebiasis, from living in an environment with poor sanitation and hygiene.
28	6	"Midwife Crisis"	Ben Bolt	Ben Bolt	25 October 2009	9.23
Dr. Martin Ellingham meets Portwenn's new midwife, Molly O'Brien (Gemma Craven), who will be looking after Louisa. Martin is dismissive of her profession and irritated by her prejudiced attitude towards him and by her insistence that men are not needed to help pregnant women. Thus the two of them do not hit it off. Molly shows Louisa a home birthing pool, and tries to persuade her to give birth via the home method rather than having the baby in a hospital. Martin arrives just in time to have an argument with the two women over the birthing method of choice. Auntie Joan responds positively when Martin tells her he is taking the surgeon position in London, and urges him to tell Louisa about it. Louisa overhears Edith tell Martin the London position is his for the taking. In the meantime, Bert hires Marigold (Regina Freedman) to work in the restaurant kitchen. She responds by bringing him game to use in the restaurant, which Bert knowingly feeds to his customers. Her husband Michael (Andrew Greenough) becomes deathly ill, Marigold shows some milder, but similar symptoms, and when Bert calls in Martin to look at Michael, the Doc finds spoiled roadkill (the very same game Marigold has been supplying to Bert) in the kitchen cupboard. He determines that they both have toxoplasmosis from eating bad meat.
29	7	"Do Not Disturb"	Ben Bolt	Richard Stoneman	1 November 2009	9.95
Dr. Martin Ellingham seeks out Louisa to talk about his new surgeon's job at Imperial College London, but they are interrupted by Bert Large, who wants to plan a baby shower for her. Joan opens up her house to the public as a B&B, and her first guest is her old friend Ted (David Ross), who has disgusting breath and a constipation issue. Joan takes him to see Martin after he displays symptoms of a heart attack. No cardiac arrest has taken place, but Martin finds a large mass in Ted's abdomen, resulting from his chewing his own hair when he is in stress. Martin and Pauline exchange angry words when she discovers a letter offering him a job at Imperial College London, with Martin incensed that she opened his mail in the first place. He discharges her from his employ, with a letter of reference. Al Large tries in vain to intervene to get a better reference letter for Pauline from Martin. After Pauline refuses to replenish the toilet paper in the bathroom, Martin has her leave immediately. Later, Martin has to come to Pauline's aid after she is stung by a jellyfish. PC Penhale wants to transfer to Metropolitan Police in London to be near Martin. In London, Edith has arranged with the hotel to share a room and bed with Martin, much to his surprise and discomfort with the sneaky situation. Her plans are stalled when Martin believes their room service employee is showing signs of a disease, and tries to alert him. In the hotel kitchen, Martin yells at him across the room, causing a chef to cut off his finger tip, but Martin otherwise saving the room service employee's life. Martin returns home immediately, thereby aborting Edith's plans.
30	8	"The Wrong Goodbye"	Ben Bolt	Jack Lothian	8 November 2009	10.28
Dr. Martin Ellingham and Pauline are surprised by the number of patients coming to see him on the last day before his surgery closes and he moves to London. Martin compliments Pauline on her efficient method of dealing with the surge of last-minute patient appointments, and wishes her luck. Edith tries to convince him that he left the London hotel room because of a fear of intimacy, but he insists it was simply because he was not interested in an intimate relationship with her personally. PC Penhale wants a last drink with Martin, believing the two of them had a close professional relationship. As a going-away gift, Mrs. Tishell gives him a loud yellow sweater with his name in large letters across the front, which he buries in a bin. After a series of mishaps, including the taxi driver crashing his car with Louisa inside it, Louisa goes into labour and the Doc is facing a dilemma; should he move away or stick around to support Louisa and their newborn child? Against Al's misgivings, Bert cooks with his own restaurant's recycled vegetable oil. Despite Martin having fired her, Pauline's services are retained by the new doctor.

=== Series 5 (2011) ===
No. overall	No. in series	Title	Directed by	Written by	Original release date	UK viewers (millions)
31	1	"Preserve the Romance"	Ben Bolt	Ben Bolt	12 September 2011	10.24
Martin Ellingham's plans to resume his career as a consultant in London are put on hold following the birth of the (as yet, unnamed) son he fathered with his now estranged partner, Louisa Glasson. When he returns, he is given the news that Auntie Joan had a heart attack and died at the wheel of her parked car. New doctor Diana Dibbs (Joanna Scanlan) has her husband replace Pauline, who has moved on to a job in Bristol. PC Joe Penhale discovers a lump on his testicle, and goes to see Martin at Louisa's home for a consultation, rather than being examined by a woman. Dr. Dibbs' qualifications as a doctor are questionable, considering that she even misdiagnosed her own type 2 diabetes. When the first patient arrives, she gives him a prescription, but also hands him pills from her handbag, her own personal diabetes pills, rather than his having to wait for Mrs. Tishell to fill the prescription at the pharmacy. She tells him that if he finds no relief, to just take more of the pills. The patient later collapses in Mrs. Tishell's pharmacy. When Martin shows up to confront her, she blocks her door with a chair, and crawls out a window to get away from him. A pursuit ensues, and she collapses on the pavement. To serve the community, Martin resumes his old practice.
32	2	"Dry Your Tears"	Ben Bolt	Richard Stoneman	19 September 2011	10.66
Determined to get to grips with fatherhood, Martin asks Louisa to move into his house so he can help to raise their son. He even suggests that Louisa and 'baby' could move to London with him. Louisa is none too sure about the move to London. Meanwhile, Aunt Joan's sister Ruth Ellingham (Eileen Atkins) turns up at Portwenn for Joan's funeral. Aunt Ruth is a doctor like Ellingham and his father Christopher, but she is a psychiatrist. Aunt Ruth, Aunt Joan, and Ellingham's father Chris were all siblings. Ellingham turns Joan's funeral into a medical warning. PC Penhale takes a mobile call in the middle of the service, and leaves, returning to interrupt with an announcement of a parked car outside. Martin injures a patient by falling on him, after the patient has bent over in the office. At the home of patient Harry Pote, he diagnoses him with brittle bones from taking too many protein shakes and spending time basking under a sun lamp. Aunt Ruth has no intentions of staying, until Martin reveals that Aunt Joan's farm was bequeathed to her. Al Large has been managing the farm until someone else takes over. Ruth reveals that she is dying, having diagnosed herself with Lupus. Martin disagrees and diagnoses her with a simple autoimmune disease. She decides to keep Joan's farm and have Al Large run it for her. Ellingham gets a new receptionist, Morwenna Newcross (Jessica Ransom), an attractive young woman to replace Pauline.
33	3	"Born with a Shotgun"	Ben Bolt	Jack Lothian	26 September 2011	10.37
Morwenna fails to make a good impression on the doc by arriving late on her first day. Her grandfather William Newcross (Peter Vaughan) shares his stash of methamphetamines with her, to make sure she is on time, and bright as a button at work. Sleepless nights are taking their toll on Martin and Louisa, who have not yet chosen a name for their new son. Tempers are frayed as they try to find ways to comfort their constantly wailing baby. Meanwhile, Aunt Ruth is dealing with intruder Michael Dunwich (Andrew-Lee Potts), who has stolen the hub caps from her car for his artistic display. His mother Shirley (Miriam Margolyes) is having abdominal and mental problems, and also believes her son is trying to poison her. Dr. Ellingham's test finds a large amount of arsenic in her system, and alerts Constable Penhale that her son might be trying to harm her. Ellingham determines the arsenic is coming from the old wallpaper in the Dunwich home, and sends her to the hospital. At the end of the day, Ellingham reads a medical magazine to his newborn son.
34	4	"Mother Knows Best"	Ben Bolt	Chris Hurford and Tom Butterworth	3 October 2011	10.43
It is Portwenn Fun Day and the village is buzzing with excitement about this major fundraising event. PC Penhale is in his element rallying the runners and whipping up support. The event sparks culinary rivalry between Bert Large who runs Large's restaurant with son Al, and Mark Briggs the landlord of the Crab and Lobster pub. They are both keen to take advantage of the day to boost their takings by providing food for the runners and spectators. Also, Louisa's mother Eleanor (played by Louise Jameson) arrives unexpectedly. Eleanor is a combative personality who finds fault with Louisa, Martin, and everyone else. Martin and Louisa find their son is sleeping through usual feeds until they find out her mother gave him some of her brew to calm him down. Louisa is not comfortable having her mother around, but Eleanor indicates she will be in town for a while. Louisa and she have an argument about Eleanor's leaving her behind and moving to Spain when Louisa was 11 years old. Mrs. Tishell and Eleanor have a fight over Martin, with Eleanor complaining about Martin and belittling Mrs. Tishell's pharmacy business. Louisa finally throws her mother out of the home she shares with Martin, and tells her she wants her out of Portwenn. Aunt Ruth hires Al full-time as her farm manager.
35	5	"Remember Me"	Paul Seed	Jack Lothian	10 October 2011	10.66
PC Joe Penhale has an unexpected visitor: his ex-wife Maggie Reid (Julie Graham), who appears to have completely forgotten that they split up a couple of years ago. He asks her if she knows the current date, and she says that it is the year 2008 (not the current 2011). Maggie's boyfriend telephones Penhale trying to find her, and Maggie says she does not know him. Penhale is torn between being with her, since he still loves her, or straightening out her seeming lapse of memory of the past few years. He takes her to Large's restaurant, where fellow diner Martin quickly spots that Maggie is showing symptoms of transient global amnesia. Bert and Al Large argue over unpaid bills, and Bert tries unsuccessfully to get Martin to invest in the restaurant. He also visits loan sharks and tries to pawn some of his personal possessions to raise needed funds. After they refuse, he borrows money from them, and lies to Al about straightening out the finances. Louisa's mother Eleanor (Louise Jameson) catches up with her old school friend Paul Hale (John Duttine), a local fisherman, who takes her out on a date. When Addison's disease causes Paul to collapse on his boat, and Martin has to rush to his rescue, Eleanor laughs about his collapse. Morwenna arrives at the surgery with an injured foot and the doctor grimaces at the sight of the blood as he treats the wound. Ellingham notices that Morwenna avoids having a tetanus vaccine and realises she is frightened of needles. PC Penhale warns Martin and Louisa that if they do not register a name for their son soon, the state will be forced to step in. In the end they name their son James Henry Ellingham, after both their grandfathers. Martin registers the name without telling Louisa.
36	6	"Don't Let Go"	Ben Bolt	Chris Hurford and Tom Butterworth	17 October 2011	10.86
In an effort to get Maggie to stay in Portwenn after she gets the all-clear, PC Joe Penhale tries to prove that he is the man for her – and even engineers situations where he can show off his macho side to impress her. Maggie does eventually leave but she and PC Penhale part on good terms, after he realizes her departure is better for both of them. Aunt Ruth finds old photos of Martin as a child. Martin steps in when school caretaker Mr Coley (Brian Pettifer) becomes confused after breathing carbon monoxide and puts the children of the school at risk. Tensions mount between Martin and Louisa as they find themselves unable to agree on anything, including his making decisions about James Henry without discussing with her. Louisa and James move in with her mother.
37	7	"Cats & Sharks"	Paul Seed	Richard Stoneman	24 October 2011	10.92
Mrs Tishell's infatuation for Martin increases, encouraged by his continued separation from Louisa. Bert Large's restaurant business is in financial trouble. He cannot even afford the food and drink for a charity event to raise money for Florence Dingle's (Anne Reid) cat sanctuary. Mrs Dingle is distraught. She desperately needs the money to continue to look after the cats and kittens in her care. Bert is also being chased by loan sharks Alastair Tonken (Alan Williams) and his son Norman (Marcus Cunningham) for the repayment of £1,000 they gave him to clear his debts, warning of repercussions if he does not pay up. Unknown to Louisa, her mother Eleanor prefers to help Bert with his restaurant, so she drops baby James Henry off with teenager Angie Grappy (Angela Terence). After Ruth gives Al £800 to pay for fencing on her farm, he instead uses the money to get Bert out of the clutches of the loan sharks. Together with the £200 Bert already had, they can repay the £1,000 to the loan sharks. However, the sharks say he still owes another £350 for interest and late payment charge. Ruth is upset when Al tells her what he did with her £800, but Al later offers her a percentage of the restaurant profits to repay his debt to her. After Mrs. Dingley collapses, Penhale tends to her while waiting for Martin to arrive. While Martin is tending Mrs. Dingley, Penhale hears Al, Bert and the loan sharks arguing, and orders the Tonkens to leave town and never return. Martin finds out Angie Grappy is tending James Henry when she shows for her own medical care, pushing the baby's pram. He confronts Louisa about Eleanor's being their son's caretaker. Martin, assisted by Morwenna, performs an emergency hernia operation on Louisa's mother Eleanor and saves her life when the ambulance's arrival is delayed.
38	8	"Ever After"	Ben Bolt	Jack Lothian	31 October 2011	10.65
Mrs. Tishell discovers that she can no longer hide her infatuation with Dr. Ellingham and she decides that she must take drastic action, fuelled by a cocktail of drugs that are affecting her judgement. Her husband Clive (Malcolm Storry) shows up and announces his retirement. After a check-up with Martin, Clive learns he has to inject himself every day, to keep his blood from clotting. Louisa's mother Eleanor says she is leaving town for a while. Mrs. Tishell misdispenses eyedrops to PC Penhale causing him to crash his Land Rover. Martin asks Mrs. Tishell to look after James for the day, and to otherwise give her husband Clive his daily injections. Clive Tishell thinks Martin and his wife have been having an affair during his long absence, the thought of which is abhorrent to Martin. She mistakenly thinks that Martin has sent her a covert message through a young couple he has treated, and she vanishes with James to a nearby holiday home. The drugs, for a few hours, cause her to think that James is her and Ellingham's son. Martin, Louisa, Aunt Ruth and PC Penhale chase after her. To coax her out of the locked house, Martin pretends to profess his love for Mrs Tishell and a desire to stay in Portwenn, while actually aiming his remarks at Louisa. James Henry is rescued, Martin and Louisa profess their love, kiss and reconcile.

=== Series 6 (2013) ===
No. overall	No. in series	Title	Directed by	Written by	Original release date	UK viewers (millions)
39	1	"Sickness and Health"	Nigel Cole	Jack Lothian	2 September 2013	9.51
Wedding bells are ringing for the Doc and Louisa, but Martin attends to his patients before the ceremony. The Doc is irritated by PC Penhale, who wrongly presumes he is best man, plus Louisa is late. It seems everyone in the village has turned up for the ceremony. The Reverend has his doubts as to whether Louisa will go through with the wedding, putting Martin on edge. Following the ceremony, Bert Large drops Martin and Louisa off at a honeymoon lodge with no telephone, no noise, and in the middle of nowhere. He also drives off with their luggage. Unfortunately, the fireplace chimney is blocked, causing the room to fill with smoke when Martin lights the fire. Louisa and Martin flee in their wedding clothes, and come across an old man named Bellamy (David Sterne) living in the woods, who points a gun at them. Louisa grabs Bellamy's gun and starts ordering him around. The roof of Bellamy's porch collapses with him underneath, and Martin performs surgery to save his life. Afterwards, Martin and Louisa end up hitching a ride with a lorry driver, finally making it back home. Meanwhile, his aunt Ruth is looking after baby James Henry. The baby refused to eat his dinner and he will not settle, crying continuously. To make matters worse, they have a power cut, and Al Large shows up to try to restore the power, as does PC Penhale. Electrician Mike Pruddy (Felix Scott) arrives to assess the electric problem. Pruddy helps Aunt Ruth to calm the baby.
40	2	"Guess Who's Coming to Dinner?"	Nigel Cole	Ben Bolt	9 September 2013	9.05
Aunt Ruth has been roped into doing a phone-in programme on Radio Portwenn with radio personality Caroline Bosman, and a listener called 'Cliff' (PC Penhale) phones in saying he finds it difficult to make friends. It is Louisa's first day back at school and their new childminder, Mrs Paris (Rosie Ede), is late for work. When she finally does arrive, Martin is dubious about handing James Henry over to this woman who is constantly scratching. Martin diagnosis her as having underarm fungus, from being too overweight. Upset with Martin, she quits. Meanwhile, electrician Mike Pruddy (Felix Scott) has a gift for handling the baby. Martin and Louisa have the head of the school board Dennis Dodds (Richard Cordery) and his wife Karen (Katie Lyons) over, and are accidentally heard over the baby monitor calling them drunks. Bert sees income opportunity by renting out son Al's bedroom to tourists. Al rents a room from Martin's receptionist Morwenna Newcross.
41	3	"The Tameness of a Wolf"	Nigel Cole	Richard Stoneman	16 September 2013	8.36
Two fishermen (Julian Seager and Tony Cottrell) wake the Doc and Louisa at the crack of dawn, having discovered Robert Campbell (Paul Moriarty) unconscious on the beach. Campbell is a former patient of Aunt Ruth's. After being revived by the doctor, Campbell starts asking Martin about his family. Aunt Ruth, who has been giving advice over the radio, tells Martin she believes she has an amorous stalker, but he is not interested. Meanwhile, it is Mike Pruddy's first day looking after James. Louisa is chilly towards him. When she gets to school she cannot help but feel uneasy and sneaks back home to check up on Mike. PC Penhale finds Campbell's car, which it appears Campbell has been sleeping in. Inside are photos and newspaper clippings of Auntie Ruth, as well as diary entries that are alarming signs of an obsession with Ruth. Campbell believes Ruth confessed on the radio that she loves him. Martin arrives in time to rescue her, and he tells Campbell that he has Type 2 diabetes and needs an injection. Bert Large rents a spare room to Jennifer Cardew (Annabelle Apsion), who is Portwenn's chemist in Mrs. Tishell's absence. Martin dislikes Jennifer immediately. Al moves into Morwenna's flat. Ten-year-old student Becky Weed (Lily Laight) writes a newspaper review of Bert's restaurant, mistakenly blaming him for her stomach illness, which Martin diagnoses as an ulcer.
42	4	"Nobody Likes Me"	Paul Seed	Charlie Martin	23 September 2013	8.89
Louisa wants Martin to engage more with James, so she arranges for him to take their baby to a library playgroup, where he has to pair up with a mother and daughter and sing songs. Meanwhile, Al signs up to a dating website, and Morwenna unsuccessfully tries to pair him up with one of her girlfriends. Bert is suspicious when he catches his new boarder, local chemist Jennifer Cardew, in the bathroom with a needle. He forces her to see Doc Martin, who finds out she has been injecting herself with botox. Aunt Ruth moves into a cottage in the village, but soon has a spot of trouble with her grumpy new next door neighbour John Moysey (Ronald Pickup). After her ceiling caves in, Al is brought in for the repair job, necessitating access to Moysey's loft. When he refuses, they enlist the help of PC Penhale, who threatens Moysey with a search warrant and employs the dog always in Martin's office as an official police "sniffer dog". Al and June discover evidence of compulsive hoarding by Moysey. Meanwhile, Martin also investigates the hoarding after Moysey becomes his patient, leading Martin to diagnose scurvy. Since Moysey's wife died, he has been eating only canned foods, and no fruits or vegetables. Mrs Eddy (Vilma Hollingbery) believes she has a melanoma, but Martin says it is a raised infected lymph node, brought on by an infected "Do Not Resuscitate" tattoo. She and her friend Ethel (Carol MacReady) tattooed each other, and are both diagnosed with spending too much time in the sun.
43	5	"The Practice Around the Corner"	Paul Seed	Julian Unthank	30 September 2013	9.17
Mrs. Tishell's return is the talk of the village, and she wears an elastic wrist band as part of her Cognitive Behavioural Therapy. All Martin's family is on edge and remembering the day she flipped and kidnapped baby James. Tishell's obsessive affection for Martin quickly disappears when he refuses to pass her as fit for work. As if he did not have enough on his plate, Martin must also face his fear of blood when tests show that Lorna Gillett (Julia Swift) has a high level of ferritin, owing to her taking iron tablets, and which is placing a strain on her heart and liver. Meanwhile, Penhale hopes to be selected for an elite police squad by taking part in a survival training course with Buddy the dog. Things go horribly wrong when he shoots himself in the foot. By the next day, Penhale has managed to hitchhike back to Martin's clinic in town. During his ordeal, Penhale packed his wound in moss, which in turn resulted in blood poisoning. Al Large has been visiting online dating sites under an alias, and unbeknownst to him, Morwenna has also been at online dating sites under an assumed name. When they separately make dates with their online connections, it turns out they were connecting online with each other. Al breaks up with Morwenna, moving out of his flat and ending up living with Penhale. Bert Large makes a date with local chemist Jennifer Cardew
44	6	"Hazardous Exposure"	Paul Seed	Charlie Martin	7 October 2013	9.09
Penhale and Al adjust to different wake-up times and styles. Penhale is ready to conquer the day, and Al wants more sleep. Al is unhappy living with Penhale, and thinking about how to get out of it distracts him from his daily work with Ruth. Encouraged by Ruth, Al decides to make changes in his life. Martin's sleep patterns make it difficult for Louisa to get a good night's sleep, so upon the advice of Jennifer, she sprinkles lavender around. Martin's mother Margaret Ellingham (Claire Bloom) delivers the news that his father has died. The Pharmaceutical Council, which earlier kept Jennifer on as their watchful eye over Mrs. Tishell, now believe Mrs. Tishell no longer needs the supervision. Bert pops the question to Jennifer, and she agrees to marry him. Ruth finds fault with Al's business proposal. Mike dates Morwenna, but their attempts at conversation do not go well. Malcolm Rayner is struggling with his breathing and Martin asks him if he has ever worked with asbestos. Malcolm is convinced he is dying and gets drunk in the local pub. Penhale locks him up to sleep it off, after Malcolm confirms he installed asbestos in the police stations and "all over town". Penhale sparks pandemonium after he puts up asbestos warnings worded, "every breath could be giving you cancer" throughout the village. Someone tells him it is not asbestos, but breathing cellulose that gives people cancer. Malcolm was not sickened by asbestos exposure, but has a malady called "pigeon fancier's lungs" due to keeping pigeons as his personal pets (and breathing their toxic waste).
45	7	"Listen with Mother"	Nigel Cole	Richard Stoneman	14 October 2013	8.58
Mrs. Tishell finds herself falling in love with Martin all over again, and visits his office with her latest physical complaint, which Martin diagnoses as angina. She has stopped taking all medications he prescribed her, and is on the verge of a heart attack. Martin rejects Louisa's suggestion that they take a small holiday with baby James. He is convinced that something is physically wrong with him following a conversation with his mother Margaret. Aunt Ruth views Margaret's sudden visit as suspicious, calling her "morally bankrupt". Ruth says Margaret damaged Martin by isolating him from friends, while keeping him emotionally distant from herself. Martin has agreed to be the special guest at the school Sports Day, which ends up in disaster, because he discourages participation in sports. He complains he has patients to see, and hands out all the medals before the competitions begin. He leaves and Louisa goes after him to talk to him about what happened. She crosses the street and is hit by a car, and is taken away by an ambulance. She tells Martin that she and James are going to her mother's home in Spain to spend time away from him. Two Royal Military policemen are trying to track down Mike Pruddy for being AWOL (Absent Without Leave) from the army. Pruddy agrees to return to the military. Penhale puts a parking violation "boot" on the military truck, so they cannot move it, giving Pruddy a chance to report back to his base voluntarily.
46	8	"Departure"	Nigel Cole	Jack Lothian	21 October 2013	9.07
Louisa decides to leave for Spain with baby James and says an awkward goodbye to Martin, who becomes teary-eyed and sad that they are leaving. He is so distraught that he cannot concentrate on his medical practice. A patient comes to him for headaches, and he absent-mindlessly inoculates her for rabies. Martin seeks Ruth's advice about his personal life. She tells him all his problems are rooted in being raised by parents who were cold and distant, and advises him that he does not have to be like his parents. Martin finally corners his mother Margaret, who makes up a story about his father's wishes on his dying bed. Martin knows she is lying, and makes her admit that her real motive in visiting him at Portwenn is to get him to give her enough money to buy an apartment in Portugal. He insists she leave his home. When Martin finds the scan of Louisa's brain, he spots a malformation and realises she could have a haemorrhage. Martin gets to the airport, and removes Louisa and James who have already boarded the plane. He takes her immediately to a medical facility. Martin apologizes to her for not being a good husband, and asks for a second chance. He then locks the nervous young doctor in a closet, and performs the procedure himself. Al presents a business plan to Ruth to turn her acreage into a bed and breakfast tourist fishing resort. He is forced to delay a meeting with her, to help Bert with his engagement party. Ruth does her homework and sees that Al has presented a solid business plan, and she agrees to it with the stipulation that Al manage the business and leave her as a silent partner. As a joke, someone has told PC Penhale that Bert's party is a costume party, so he shows up dressed as a New York City policeman, complete with fake moustache. Radio presenter Caroline Bosman (Felicity Montagu) receives an electrical shock that knocks her out. Morwenna calls Martin, but Mrs. Tishell tries to push Morwenna out of the way to revive Caroline, convinced Martin wants her personally to administer CPR. Al borrows a defibrillator kit from the Life Boat Station, and is able to save her life, while Morwenna keeps Mrs. Tishell away.

=== Series 7 (2015) ===
No. overall	No. in series	Title	Directed by	Written by	Original release date	UK viewers (millions)
47	1	"Rescue Me"	Nigel Cole	Jack Lothian	7 September 2015	6.64
With Louisa visiting her mother in Spain to get some perspective on their marriage, Martin knows he needs to try to change for the sake of their relationship, so he endeavours to keep his promise to her to see a therapist. Aunt Ruth arranges an appointment for him with Dr Rachel Timoney (Emily Bevan), but a lifeboat training exercise causes problems for the doctor. Joe Penhale wants to know how much longer Al will live in his flat before moving out to the Bed and Breakfast enterprise. Aunt Ruth rejects Al's idea of naming their resort the play on words "Salmon Enchanted Evening". Al works to get the enterprise up and running, but he is having labour problems. His father Bert is shorthanded with his own business and also is miffed that Al asks for his help only as a last resort. Steve Baker (Daniel Ryan) who was supposed to be helping Al, leaves to work on the lifeboat training. Needing a medical certificate clearance to participate, he gives Martin a sample of Barry's urine instead, which suggests cancer. Martin discovers the deception while examining Barry for another issue. While participating in the lifeboat training exercise as the pilot, Steve has a minor stroke and collapses creating a real-life emergency. In spite of Martin's refusal to allow Morwenna time off for lifeboat training, he finally relents. Morwenna is the only one on the boat with any medical knowledge, and performs a procedure that saves Steve's life. Barry quits working for Steve.
48	2	"The Shock of the New"	Nigel Cole	Julian Unthank	14 September 2015	7.33
Martin begins his therapy sessions with Dr. Rachel Timoney (Emily Bevan). When he indicates his prime objective is to make Louisa happy, the doctor requests to also see Louisa, who arrives home early with baby James. Both she and Martin want to make the relationship work, and Louisa believes it would help if she moved out. Louisa has to find a new babysitter to look after James Henry and reluctantly decides to offer Janice Bone (Robyn Addison) a trial. Aunt Ruth, who is soon leaving for London to interview for a medical position, asks Mrs Tishell for pain medication for her neck. Martin walks in the pharmacy, and she denies to Martin that she might have polymyalgia rheumatica. However, she tests positive for both that and giant cell arteritis. Ruth refuses to admit there is anything wrong, and says she will be in London for 10 days interviewing for a medical position, which frustrates Martin. He eventually talks her out of applying for the London position. Morwenna asks Martin for a 30% pay rise. Al welcomes his first fishing guests Heather and Bruce Merchant, but Heather finds fishing boring. A mouse loose on the property bites Al, and Ruth captures it in a sieve. He offers the Merchants a free lobster meal to compensate for the mouse incident. Penhale is anxious to use his new police issue 50,000-watt Taser electroshock weapon, but Bert questions whether or not it was sent to Penhale by mistake. Bert's lobster supplier fails to deliver sufficient quantity on time, and Bert busies himself trying to talk customers out of ordering lobster. Bert hires Becky and her girlfriends to work for him. Becky accidentally kills the remaining lobsters by putting them in fresh water. When a fight ensues between Bert and the Merchants, Penhale tries to taser Bruce, hitting Heather.
49	3	"It's Good to Talk"	Nigel Cole	Charlie Martin and Jack Lothian	21 September 2015	6.72
Martin decides to move out of the surgery to give Louisa space. He and Louisa agree to couples therapy sessions with Dr Rachel Timoney. Alice Bell and her husband run a pig farm, and Mr. Bell is sidelined by an injury in the pig pen. Alice wants her daughter Ellie to do the farm work, not mess around with her music. Melanie (Rosie Cavaliero) takes over as host of Radio Portwenn, and introduces a new segment on dietary health. Ellie has run away from home, and Melanie takes her to see Martin who diagnoses her with strep throat. Instead of resting her voice, Ellie sings on Melanie's radio show after Melanie encourages her by saying she might be the next Barbara Dickson. Ellie debuts on Radio Portwenn with a song about pigs, but collapses in the middle of her song. Martin performs an emergency operation while Melanie narrates the emergency on the air. After the disastrous lobster fest at Bert's restaurant, he is given notice of foreclosure on his property. He receives a letter from Jennifer who tells him she will not be returning to him. The letter causes him to walk away from the restaurant, not caring what happens to his business or anything else. Aunt Ruth sees him in a somewhat dazed state of mind, leaving town with a suitcase and telling her he does not know where he is going, just that he is leaving. She visits Al and expresses concern for Bert's behaviour. Al shares her concern, but does not know what is going on. He files a missing person report with PC Penhale, who is helping Janice Bone babysit. By the time Al finds Bert, he is starting to lift himself up and return to life.
50	4	"Education, Education, Education"	Charles Palmer	Richard Stoneman	28 September 2015	8.26
Louisa and Martin attend their first therapy session together. Martin allows Louisa's former student 15-year-old Peter Cronk to shadow (assist) Doc Martin at the clinic. Cronk gets on the wrong side of Morwenna, and is dismissed by Martin when he slams a book on the wrist of a woman to flatten a ganglion cyst. Mrs Tishell's husband Clive (Malcolm Storry) has been absent for four years since he believed his wife and Martin were having an affair. Now he has returned and wants to start anew with her. Bert Large has lost everything, his business and his home, and is living out of his van while he figures out a way to get back on his feet. He experiments with making whisky in his van. Meanwhile, he hopes to literally keep off the radar of the eagerly helpful PC Penhale, who tries to impress babysitter Janice Bone with his radar gun. Martin saves the life of student Jessy Bawdin who collapses from Kawasaki disease during a school class outing, after the teacher dismissed her symptoms as not important.
51	5	"Control-Alt-Delete"	Charles Palmer	Julian Unthank	5 October 2015	8.06
Clive Tishell is suspicious of his wife cooking meals she does not feed him. Unbeknownst to him, she leaves the meals on Martin's doorstep. Clive tries to patch things up with her, in hopes they can start their relationship anew. Martin, meanwhile, insists she stop with the door-step meals, as he believes they attract Buddy the dog. Martin resolves to find a vet to have the dog put down. but instead is persuaded to allow Buddy to live with new vet Angela Sim (Caroline Quentin). Buddy makes his way back to Martin's doorstep. Eventually, Mrs. Tishell clears her cupboard of all the prepared meals she has stored away, tossing them into the rubbish. Portwenn newcomer Debbie Sharrock, asks the Doc for a refill of ADHD medication, from another doctor's prescription for her daughter Kelly. Martin refuses until he has been able to see Kelly's notes and make his own diagnosis. After Kelly collapses, Martin examines her and suspects epilepsy instead, sending her for tests. Ruth tells Al she does not want Bert to park on her property forever. Checking up on him, she discovers he is using his van as an unlicensed distillery to manufacture his own whisky. After tasting Bert's brew, Ruth decides not to put a halt to his operation. Penhale makes a hash of asking Janice (Robyn Addison) out. Louisa and Martin's therapy homework is a picnic on the beach, where Martin tells sunbathers to use sun screen and cover up to avoid sunburn. While Louisa and James Henry are trying to share a fun moment digging sand and building a sand castle, Martin criticizes their efforts. Angela believes Buddy the dog is trying to send Martin telepathic messages, and both show up on the beach, where Angela appears to be hallucinating. She has been self-medicating with animal medicine. When Angela resigns to taking Buddy to live with her, he runs away and shows up on Martin's doorstep.
52	6	"Other People's Children"	Ben Gregor	Julian Unthank	19 October 2015	7.82
Louisa helps out her ex-boyfriend Danny when he brings seven children from London to camp on Ruth's farm – supervised by Al and Bert – while she and Martin plan a date at the suggestion of Dr Timoney. Danny tries to seduce Louisa to leave Martin, telling her that she deserves better, but Louisa is not the least bit interested. Martin overhears the conversation. Alexandra Lucas (Kerry Howard) has returned from India and attends the surgery; Martin diagnoses her as suffering from a highly infectious strain of hepatitis and tells her to isolate herself. Martin arranges for teenager Janice to watch James, but plans for the date go awry when youngster Jake from Danny's group goes missing. When Jake is found, Danny callously scolds the child, but Martin realizes Jake's behaviour is a sign of severe illness, and immediately arranges for his hospitalization. Martin later discovers Alexandra acting as the entertainer at James's pirate-themed first birthday party, generating a hepatitis scare that makes all the guests leave very quickly. Mrs. Tishell attempts to rekindle her love life with husband Clive, but he visits Martin for what he believes is erectile disfunction. Without consulting anyone, Clive rubs his chest with testosterone gel in hopes of satisfying his wife, but the gel triggers a heart attack. PC Penhale discovers Bert's unlicensed whiskey distillery that he operates out of his van.
53	7	"Facta Non Verba"	Ben Gregor	Richard Stoneman	26 October 2015	8.04
Dr Timoney suggests that perhaps Martin and Louisa are not meant to be a couple. She asks them to both make a list of why they should stay together, and return for another session with her. Dr. Timoney is later involved in a car accident outside the school. While picking up something from Mrs. Tishell, she gossips about Martin's and Louisa's marriage troubles. Martin believes she might have head damage from the accident, and tells her she needs a CT scan. Louisa is not pleased when her new art teacher Erica Holbrooke (Kelly Adams) wants to try out some alternative ideas on the children. She wants the children to bring in their favourite toys to be stapled up on a board, but the children refuse to allow that to happen to their toys. Erica faints in the classroom. Meanwhile, Martin is annoyed that Erica is his new next door neighbour. Her daughter's violin playing gets on his nerves. Erica is also noisy and accident-prone, repeatedly drops in his home for medical advice. She asks too many personal questions about Martin's and Louisa's status, thinking they are headed for a divorce. Threatened with arrest by PC Penhale if he continues his unlicensed whisky distillery Bert decides to go back to being a handyman, but that also has its drawbacks – his first customer is school teacher Erica. Janice Bone (Robyn Addison) gets cosy with PC Penhale, who is offered a transfer to Exeter in recognition of his hard work. Although he and Janice have not yet got close enough to be a couple, he is quite fond of her and does not want to leave her behind. Janice gives him a kiss, holds his hand, and convinces him to stay. Sigourney Weaver makes a guest appearance as American tourist Beth Traywick. The episode ends with Martin suggesting he and Louisa go their separate ways.
54	8	"The Doctor Is Out"	Ben Gregor	Jack Lothian	2 November 2015	8.03
Mrs. Tishell tells Martin she is going to try to work things out with her husband. Morwenna negotiates with Martin for a payrise. Ruth and Bert offer Al a proposition regarding the whisky sales to be licensed at the B&B. Annie Winton (Gemma Jones) tricks Martin into paying a house call to her terminally ill husband Jim. Martin advises him to follow the hospital's advice. Annie is not satisfied, and holds Martin prisoner at gunpoint. Martin escapes on foot, and flags down a passing motorist, who turns out to be the Wintons' son Clemo, who takes Martin right back to the Winton house. Buddy, the little dog who is always following Martin around, tracks him to the Winton house, and tries to alert PC Penhale. What Dr. Ellingham's friends and family fail to realise is that he is actually trapped up at the Wilton farm, where desperate wife Annie is trying to coerce him into curing her seriously ill husband Jim. Louisa tells marriage therapist Dr. Timoney that she and Martin are discontinuing the sessions. Louisa worries Dr. Timoney's suggestion that she and Martin are not meant to be together might have prompted him to leave Portwenn for good. Calling on Ruth, Morwenna and Janice for help, she tries to track him down, with no luck. PC Penhale drives Louisa up to Winton Farm, where Louisa finds Martin's shoes in the hallway, and discover his car parked outside. They find Martin threatened with his life, unless he operates on Jim. Ruth and Al also arrive at the farm looking for Martin, who is successfully operating on Jim.

=== Series 8 (2017) ===
No. overall	No. in series	Title	Directed by	Written by	Original release date	UK viewers (millions)
55	1	"Mysterious Ways"	Nigel Cole	Jack Lothian	20 September 2017	7.65
PC Joe Penhale, suffering from kidney stones, and Janice Bone, nanny to baby James Ellingham, are set to be married. This is the first wedding that Curate Rosie Edwards (Lucy Briggs-Owen) has ever officiated, but Joe is disappointed and nervous that a vicar is not officiating. Al Large is best man, but Penhale really wanted Martin to be best man. Bert hopes his whiskey enterprise will profit from pre-ceremony festivities. Aunt Ruth demands he provide her with documentation of expenses and sales on their whiskey enterprise, and finds the business is losing money. Wedding guests start fainting after they all drink directly from a bottle of Bert's whiskey they pass around. Martin diagnoses Joe with kidney stones and prescribes medication, but Joe refuses to take, fearing it might hinder the wedding ceremony. During the ceremony, Curate Edwards faints from nervousness. Janice has a change of heart about marrying Joe, and walks out on their wedding, leaving Joe with a broken heart. After successfully rekindling their relationship, Louisa and Martin are living together again, but Louisa finds herself juggling too many responsibilities. Buddy the dog, who has been following Martin around for years, is finally allowed to stay because baby James Henry loves the dog.
56	2	"Sons and Lovers"	Nigel Cole	Richard Stoneman	27 September 2017	7.23
After Janice jilts Joe Penhale at the altar, Martin and Louisa need to find a day care for James. After successfully counselling young student Astrid Trappett, Louisa considers becoming a child counsellor. Ken Hollister (Clive Russell), landlord of the Crab and Lobster (the only pub in town), collapses, and Martin diagnoses him with leptospirosis bacterial infection, caused by the rats infesting his pub basement. Clive Tishell tests the pharmacy's new blood-pressure monitor on Al Large, which reveals Al's excessively high blood pressure. Ruth considers selling her farm. Receipts for the B&B's whiskey enterprise with Bert Large are not going as expected. John Rahmanzai (Art Malik), temporarily in town to scatter his late father's ashes, has an asthmatic attack and is saved by Martin, and also discovers that Ruth had an affair with his father long, long ago.
57	3	"Farewell, My Lovely"	Nigel Cole	Julian Unthank	4 October 2017	7.18
Louisa's stress is compounded when she takes a group of students on a sailing trip and the instructor passes out while they are at sea. Ruth's decision to sell the farm causes trouble for the Large family enterprises. Bert helps Caitlin Morgan (Angela Curran) out at her shop and she lets him sleep in her spare room. Ken Hollister closes the Crab and Lobster due to his health scare and Al suggests that he should take over the management duties, while excluding Bert's participation. To attract Ruth as a business sponsor, Al and Morwenna throw an event that raises £500 to keep the pub open. During the festivities, Clive Tishell drops dead and when Martin and Penhale break the news to his wife Sally she appears to be emotionless.
58	4	"Faith"	Stuart Orme	Colin Bateman	11 October 2017	7.35
Morwenna's missionary parents arrive from Kenya to pay her a surprise visit and are taken aback by her relationship with Al. Someone breaks into the school and vandalizes it. Buddy has a new canine friend, driving the Doc extra crazy. Bert is desperately lonely. Concerned at Morwenna's mum's appearance, Martin finds out from her that she has been diagnosed with terminal liver cancer, but he is concerned that it may be a misdiagnosis. Dan Willis is back from university, acting strangely and suffering from shingles. Mary Rawlings pays a visit to the doc where nothing seems to be wrong. Louisa begins her psychology tutorials.
59	5	"From the Mouths of Babes"	Stuart Orme	Andrew Rattenbury	18 October 2017	7.62
With James teething, Martin and Louisa are desperate for more sleep, and take the advice of Mel Hendy (Rosie Ede) to let James chew on amber beads, but Buddy the dog ends up chewing on the beads, and James gets a bead stuck up his nose. Angela Sim's nephew Toby enrols in Louisa's school. After Toby appears ill, Martin diagnoses him with scarlet fever. Al gets a new customer for the whiskey business but needs Bert's help, because he has no knowledge of how to operate the distillery equipment. Bert overhears Sally Tishell talking to herself in the back room. He advises her to acknowledge Clive's death, and get on with her life, but she shoos Bert away. Ruth also overhears Sally talking to herself, and asks Martin to pay her a visit. Bert is under increasing pressure from Caitlin, his employer/landlady, to take their relationship from strictly professional to something much more intimate. Martin tells artist Walter O'Donnell he is in danger of losing his sight if he does not follow the doctor's orders. PC Penhale shuts down veterinarian Angela Sim's unlicensed goods and services business she has been operating out of the back of her car.
60	6	"Accidental Hero"	Stuart Orme	Julian Unthank	25 October 2017	7.26
James has started biting not only Louisa but also other children at the nursery. Louisa is worried but Martin puts it down to his age. Mature student Tina Collins (Samantha Spiro) is a classmate of Louisa's, giving her a lift to her classes, and has spoken to their lecturer about James' biting. Martin is not impressed and Louisa takes it personally when Martin says there is something wrong with Tina. But Martin is proved correct, when Tina collapses from taking Modafinil, a smart drug, used for treating sleep disorders. Louisa is in the car with Tina driving, Tina loses control and crashes the car. Martin says she almost killed his wife, and she is a menace to the public. Penhale decides to have a police open house to raise community awareness, but local farmer Hannah Butler (Yolanda Kettle) arrives to file a complaint about theft of her sheep. Penhale is feeling so alone, that he asks for a session with Ruth to air his problems. Morwenna leaves the surgery for a weekend away with Al at Hannah's camping site, leaving her friend Emily to stand in for her. Al is nervous to leave Bert running the pub but agrees. Hannah has orf (a viral skin disease which can spread to humans by handling infected sheep and goats) so cannot serve Al and Morwenna any food. They find the yurt very cold and Hannah lends them a leaky paraffin stove; when Al tries to light it he ends up burning down the yurt. Now there's only Emily helping Doc Martin, but she quits. Left on his own, Martin injures himself, tripping over Buddy. With Martin in an inflatable cast, Mrs Tishell insists she help out as receptionist. Local butcher Trevor Dodds (Richard McCabe) arrives for his annual physical. He also has developed Orf, which is highly contagious. Martin enlists the assistance of Penhale to find out the identification of every customer Dodds sold meat to, and to destroy the meat. When Penhale arrives at Dodds' farm, he discovers that Dodds has been stealing Hannah's sheep and her alpaca. When the alpaca tries to escape Dodds is knocked over and severs his femoral artery with a knife, necessitating Martin rush to the rescue. Owing to his injury he has to ask Mrs. Tishell to drive him to Dodds' farm and assist him while he patches up Dodds. Morwenna and Al hitch a ride back to town with Penhale and interrupt Bert's special barbecue as the meat had been supplied by Dodds and is contaminated.
61	7	"Blade on the Feather"	Nigel Cole	Richard Stoneman	1 November 2017	7.25
Morwenna is the Portwenn team captain in the annual gig rowing race against Port Carran. The rival captain, Alice Taylor (Pippa Nixon), has a problem with her leg, and Joe Penhale, acting as race umpire, sends her to see Martin; he diagnoses a Baker's Cyst and proposes to drain the fluid using a needle. Alice has a fear of needles and passes out, hitting her head on the medical tray as she falls. At the sight of the blood, Martin also passes out. Morwenna persuades Al to take the place of one of the Portwenn rowers and Alice passes out again in the middle of the race, spurning Martin's offer of help when the boat reaches shore; it turns out that she has made a formal complaint about his treatment of her and his blood phobia. Chris Parsons (Vincent Franklin) tells him that he will have to cease practising until he has faced a hearing into the incident. Louisa buys a new car from Graham Hendy (Richard Lumsden), the local garage owner and Mel's husband, and announces her intention to stand down as headmistress at the school party that takes place during the gig race. Graham appears drunk, although he denies drinking; Martin diagnoses him as having "auto brewery syndrome" where his gut yeast creates alcohol.
62	8	"All My Trials"	Nigel Cole	Jack Lothian	8 November 2017	7.73
Martin stops practising the week before his hearing, and patients are told they have to attend the surgery at Wadebridge, but some continue to solicit his advice. American tourist Beth Traywick (Sigourney Weaver) returns to the village and asks Mrs. Tishell for help, trying to trace her distant Cornish relations as she fears she may have a hereditary illness. Much to Mrs Tishell's annoyance Beth insists on seeing Martin to discuss her symptoms, and he is able to reassure her without officially treating her as a patient. Chris Parsons, who has given up drinking, is persuaded to try the Large's latest whisky, as a result of which he tries to kiss Louisa before experiencing a shaking fit; fortunately Martin arrives in time to give him appropriate medication. Joe Penhale commissions a bust of himself from Bill Potter (Tom Mothersdale) and as Martin is out of action tries to treat Bill's ganglion by hitting it with a book. Bill's hand turns black as a result and Penhale rushes him to the Castle Hotel, where Martin's hearing is being presided over by Professor Langan (Rupert Vansittart); Martin has to undertake emergency surgery with Langan's help.

=== Series 9 (2019) ===
No. overall	No. in series	Title	Directed by	Written by	Original release date	UK viewers (millions)
63	1	"To the Lighthouse"	Nigel Cole	Jack Lothian	25 September 2019	7.22
Dr Rebecca Hedden (Hermione Gulliford), a representative from the medical council comes to assess Martin and his surgery and shadows him while he is seeing patients. Martin and Louisa discuss whether to have another child. Al finds himself proposing to Morwenna (although he did not realise he was doing so), and she accepts. Mrs Tishell is invited by a male friend on a trip to Godrevy lighthouse where she has an accident resulting in Martin being called out to the lighthouse, where Dr Hedden sustains an electric shock and Martin has to deliver CPR.
64	2	"The Shock of the New"	Nigel Cole	Ash Ditta	2 October 2019	7.21
Martin is forced to do some refresher courses, while Louisa begins a new career. The new headmistress Lorna Argyll (Rosalie Craig) rebuffs Louisa's offer for a handover meeting before collapsing. Morwenna challenges Al regarding whether he really meant to propose, but they agree they want to go ahead with the wedding. She uses him as a guinea-pig for her CPR training and manages to crack one of his ribs.
65	3	"S.W.A.L.K."	Nigel Cole	Julian Unthank	9 October 2019	7.04
Louisa organises a special evening for Martin's birthday, but it does not go to plan because of Al's surprise party. Ruth becomes uncharacteristically forgetful, which causes general anxiety.
66	4	"Paint It Black"	Charles Palmer	Andrew Rattenbury	16 October 2019	7.00
Martin has his second GMC assessment, and Buddy goes missing. Elsewhere, Penhale is upset when his predecessor, Mark Mylow, arrives and tries to take charge.
67	5	"Wild West Country"	Charles Palmer	Alastair Galbraith	23 October 2019	7.11
Someone's been shot! Penhale is keen to work out who is responsible.
68	6	"Equilibrium"	Charles Palmer	Chris Reddy	30 October 2019	6.99
Martin and Louisa have their first fertility appointment, while Penhale responds to a case of vandalism and gets a free surfing lesson.
69	7	"Single White Bevy"	Nigel Cole	Julian Unthank	6 November 2019	6.94
Mrs Tishell sends her work experience girl packing and Martin has to rush Buddy up to Angela. Al is officially moving in with Morwenna, which thrills Caitlin more than Bert.
70	8	"Licence to Practice"	Nigel Cole	Jack Lothian	13 November 2019	7.32
The village prepares for Al and Morwenna's wedding. Ruth shows Louisa that young James is highly gifted and reminds her that, unlike Martin, James has two loving parents. Martin reacts badly to blood during a surgery that is designed to test his control. At the wedding, Louisa reveals to Martin that she is pregnant. He replies that he is not a doctor anymore.

=== Series 10 (2022) ===
No. overall	No. in series	Title	Directed by	Written by	Original release date	UK viewers (millions)
71	1	"I Will Survive"	Nigel Cole	Jack Lothian	7 September 2022	5.19
One year after Al and Morwenna’s wedding, the doc is mending old clocks and getting underfoot, caring for the new baby, Mary Elizabeth, and Louisa is using the surgery for child counselling. Mrs. Tishell tries to convince the doc to go back to work, asking for signatures and stapling her hand to persuade him to treat her. Penhale does his best to issue formal warnings to keep the Doc away from Abigail (Fay Ripley), a woman who is constantly tired and winds up in a car crash on the edge of a cliff. Ruth goes to a serial killer’s convention. Morwenna tries to convince Bert and Al to jointly take over an abandoned caravan park in order to impress her boss at her new job at the local estate agent's. The doc finally realises he wants his job back and admits his mistakes to ultimately get it back.
72	2	"One Night Only"	Philip John	Andrew Rattenbury	14 September 2022	4.75
The realisation that things are getting a bit cramped, with both Martin and Louisa working out of the surgery, sees the two explore new premises, in the form of a house on the other side of town being sold by George Upton (David Hayman), recently widowed, and who has been the object of noise complaints over recent nights and – what Penhale assumes – possible supernatural interference. Al and Bert's attempts to get their caravan site up and running are plagued by difficulties, including Al accidentally being stabbed by his food van colleague, and a worker hired to clear out fly-tipped rubbish continually on the verge of passing out. Morwenna's concern for George winds up with her being enlisted back into her old receptionist job, when the surgery becomes as dysfunctional and chaotic as the new temp, Max.
73	3	"How Long Has This Been Going On?"	Kate Cheeseman	Kevin Cecil	21 September 2022	4.79
The doc encounters park ranger Stewart James on a home visit to a local farmer, and invites him for a long-awaited check-up, where Morwenna coerces Al and Joe into attending one of his survival courses, whose success Stewart is becoming stressed over ensuring, and Al is reluctant based on Stewart's past mental health problems. Stewart's mental state seems to deteriorate as the evening goes on, and Al manages to escape and enlist the doc – who uncovers a link between Stewart's delusions and the local farmer's ailments as he attempts to sell off sheepskins. Pippa, the new headteacher at the local school, is enthusiastic over the – albeit unsanctioned – garden she has set up, when she develops a rash, and her health suddenly declines at an event at the school when many of the children also turn out to have a rash.
74	4	"Everlasting Love"	Philip John	Julian Unthank	28 September 2022	5.45
The doc faces multiple patients whose ailments have been exacerbated based on the advice of a herbalist that has set up shop in the village, and discovers the link between her opposition to modern medicine and a supposed young mother whose baby shows the signs of mumps. Mrs. Tishell is determined to help Irene Moore get back in the water after she is told to avoid her usual morning swim in case it flares up her ongoing migraine issues. An old flame of Martin's from university turns up inviting him to a conference, to Louisa's displeasure – who is already dealing with James' jealousy over the attention baby Mary is receiving. Ruth's return from Mexico sees some attention from Chicken, the family's adopted dog, and the revelation she has developed deep vein thrombosis. Joe deals with guilt over believing he has accidentally poisoned former fiancée Janice in an attempt to woo her back over dinner, when it becomes clear the blame rests with her new fish pedicure sideline.
75	5	"Fly Me To The Moon"	Kate Cheeseman	Chris Reddy	5 October 2022	5.36
Louisa receives a shock when her father Terry turns up at the house, with both her and Martin suspicious of his intentions, having just been released from prison; he confidentially discloses to Martin that it was on compassionate grounds, having been diagnosed with terminal motor neurone disease, although Martin is not convinced that diagnosis is accurate. Meanwhile, he deals with the two squabbling siblings who own the fish shop, in particular why one of them appears to have continuous sea sickness on land, and Ruth's attempts to further help him progress on tackling his blood phobia by leaving it in various forms in numerous places around the surgery, designed to see how he copes with unexpected appearances of it. Al is less than impressed with Bert when he reveals his plans to return to the whiskey distilling business, and his efforts to expel a squatter from a caravan he is trying to sell. Joe tries to act hard to get around Janice.
76	6	"Return to Sender"	Kate Cheeseman	Amy Roberts and Loren Mclaughlan	12 October 2022	5.69
Martin jets off to London to make the keynote speech at a conference he has been invited to, attending to a member of an injured bridal party on the way over, and the behaviour of his ex-girlfriend Sophie. Janice calls upon Joe for help while babysitting for James and Mary.
77	7	"Love Will Set You Free"	Nigel Cole	Jack Lothian	19 October 2022	5.61
All of Portwenn is gossipping about Martin’s Imperial College job offer, but he is as of yet indecisive. Caitlin blames Bert for flooding the pub’s cellar, and an emergency on the rocks with Chris Parsons helps Morwenna make a crucial decision.
78	8	"Our Last Summer"	Nigel Cole	Jack Lothian	26 October 2022	6.07
It is Louisa and Martin's last day in Portwenn and, when Chicken the family dog goes missing, James refuses to leave without him. A former London stockbroker has just taken over Aunt Joan's old farm, mirroring Martin's move in reverse. Martin and Louisa go to look for Chicken at the farm when the new owner reports he has seen the dog there. They find the dog, but cause a cattle stampede. Martin has an accident on a barbed wire fence and is seriously injured. There's no phone signal, so Louisa must fix his wound as best she can, operating with his guidance, and take him to the hospital. When Mrs. Tishell finds the surgery completely empty, she "loses the plot". Martin recovers and he and Louisa decide to remain in Portwenn.
79	9	"Last Christmas in Portwenn"	Nigel Cole	Jack Lothian	25 December 2022	5.95
Christmas arrives and Doc Martin and Louisa take James to see Santa, portrayed by Leonard (Ron Cook) . Martin notices Leonard scratching a rash and closes the grotto, concerned that he may be contagious. Martin hears that his mother has died of a heart attack. Mrs. Tishell, believing that she may have throat cancer, kisses Martin under the mistletoe in her pharmacy, and he storms out in anger, but later returns, discovers she has only GERD, and, incidentally, no longer needs her neck brace. Some "psycho" (Joe Penhale) is leaving birds (three hens, two doves) in Janice's shop (after she tells him her favourite song is "The Twelve Days of Christmas"), which is terrifying her. Louisa works hard to organize a Christmas lantern parade like the ones she remembers from her childhood. On his way to visit Leonard after hearing over the phone that he had seriously cut his leg, Martin crashes his car in the snow and trips over and falls unconscious. He wakes up two hours later, suffering the effects of hypothermia. He hallucinates that he sees his mother, though manages to contact Louisa to relay his situation and makes his way to Leonard's farmhouse. After recovering, Martin concludes Leonard has Coeliac disease based on the rash along with other symptoms and Leonard is not contagious as a result. After tending to Leonard's cut leg they take Leonard's sleigh into Portwenn, and Martin takes James for a ride. Morwenna tells Al that she is pregnant. Joe Penhale proposes to Janice and she accepts. The series ends with Martin's Chinese lantern lighting the Christmas tree on fire.

== Home media ==
Series	Episodes	DVD release		
Series	Episodes	Region 1	Region 2	Region 4
1	6	12 June 2007	31 October 2005	29 March 2006
2	8	28 July 2009	3 April 2006	26 July 2006
TV Film		28 July 2009	29 September 2008	17 October 2007
3	7	2 February 2010	18 February 2008	14 May 2008
4	8	6 July 2010	1 March 2010	29 September 2010
5	8	5 June 2012	5 March 2012	21 March 2012
6	8	10 December 2013	24 March 2014	23 April 2014
7	8	8 December 2015	16 November 2015	27 April 2016
8	8	12 December 2017	13 November 2017	6 December 2017
9	8	10 December 2019	11 December 2019	9 December 2019
10	9	21 March 2023	12 December 2022	
