= Harriet Cains =

British actress (born 1993)

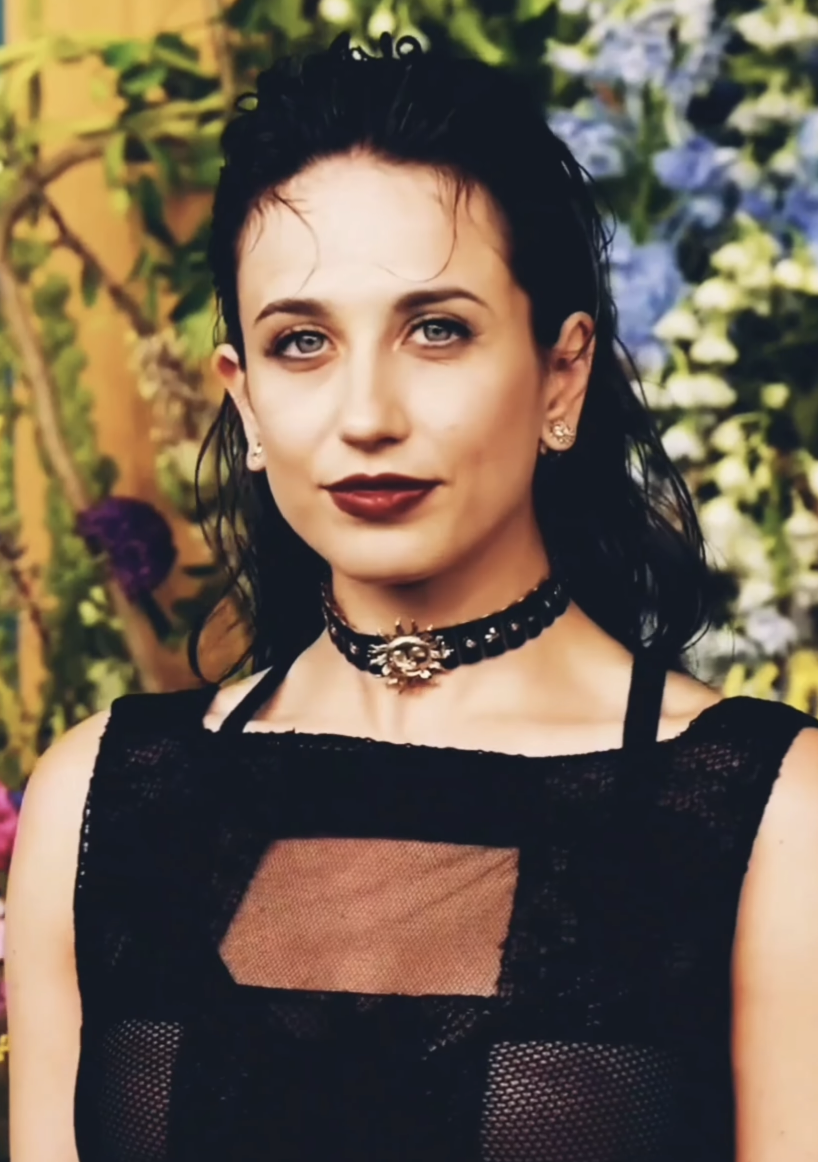
- Cains in 2024
- Born: 17 September 1993 (age 32); Nottingham, England
- Occupation: Actress
- Years active: 2012–present
- Notable work: In the Flesh; Safe House; Bridgerton

Harriet Cains (born 17 September 1993) is an English actress. She is best known for her roles as Jem Walker in the BBC Three series In the Flesh (2013–2014) and Philippa Featherington in the Netflix period drama Bridgerton (2020–present).

== Early life and education ==
Cains is from Nottingham. She took acting classes at a drama club called Circle Up for three years before going on to train at the Television Workshop.

== Career ==
During her time with the Television Workshop, Cains was cast in short films roles as well as Hollyoaks Later. She became aware of auditions in Manchester for the series In the Flesh and she was cast as Jem Walker. To prepare for the role, Cains watched documentaries about post-traumatic stress disorder and anxiety while also talking to people with experience to portray them in a realistic manner.

In 2015, Cains was cast as Louisa Blackwell in Safe House. Since 2016, she has appeared in various supporting roles, including Lizzie Hallum for the crime series Vera and Jade Hopkirk in Line of Duty in early 2017.

At the beginning of July 2017, it was announced that Cains would become a series regular in the second season of the ITV/Netflix series Marcella, as single mum Gail Donovan. The second series began airing in February 2018, with Cains appearing in six episodes.

Cains was a contributing performer of all-female comedy collective Major Labia until 2017.

In 2019, Cains was as cast as Philippa Featherington in the 2020 Shondaland and Netflix period drama Bridgerton, based on the books by Julia Quinn. Cains is set to star opposite Luke Brandon Field in the horror film Video Killed the Radio Star.

== Filmography ==
=== Film ===
Year	Title	Role	Notes
2012	The Love Interest		Short film
2012	Human Beings	Jamie	Short film
2016	Sweet Maddie Stone	Tammy	Short film
2018	Mercury	Bambi	Short film
2025	Saipan	Theresa	Feature Film
TBA	Queer Fear		Short film
TBA	Video Killed The Radio Star	Maddie	Filming

=== Television ===
Year	Title	Role	Notes
2012	Doctors	Sienna Roberts	Episode: "Contact"
2013	Hollyoaks Later	Harriet Gonzalez	4 episodes
2013–2014	In the Flesh	Jem Walker	9 episodes
2015	Safe House	Louisa Blackwell	4 episodes
2016	Vera	Lizzie Hallum	Episode: "The Moth Catcher"
2017	No Offence	Sally Hislop	Episode: "Episode #2.4"
2017	Line of Duty	Jade Hopkirk	Episode: "In the Shadow of the Truth"
2018	Marcella	Gail Davidson	6 episodes
2020	Urban Myths	Kathy Etchingham	Episode: "Hendrix & Handel"
2020–present	Bridgerton	Philippa Featherington/Finch	
2022	The Bastard Son & The Devil Himself	Hazel	Episode: "Episode #1.2"

== Awards and nominations ==
Year	Award	Category	Work	Result	Notes	Ref.
2018	European Short Film Festival of Nice	European Competition: Female Interpretation	Mercury	Won	Shared with Isabella Laughland	
2021	Screen Actors Guild Awards	Outstanding Performance by an Ensemble in a Drama Series	Bridgerton	Nominated		
