= Hung Out =

- Genre: Sitcom
- Created by: Maya Abrahams; Samuel Abrahams; David L.E. Davis; Lucy McCall; Alex McGettigan; James Shakeshaft
- Written by: Maya Abrahams; Samuel Abrahams; David L. E. Davis; Lucy McCall; Alex McGettigan; James Shakeshaft
- Directed by: Samuel Abrahams
- Starring: Emily Bevan; David L. E. Davis; Lucy McCall; Alex McGettigan; James Shakeshaft; Catherine Shepherd
- Composer: Philip Zikking
- Country of origin: United Kingdom
- Original language: English

Production
- Executive producers: Alan Marke; Jim Reid; Matt Tiller
- Producer: Sally Martin
- Cinematography: Ed Rutherford
- Editor: Nigel Williams
- Camera setup: Single-camera
- Running time: 30mins
- Production company: Channel K

Original release
- Network: Channel 4
- Release: 23 April 2010

Hung Out is a British sitcom television pilot that aired in 2010 as part of the Channel 4 series Comedy Lab. The plot of Hung Out centers around two friends, Rob (portrayed by Matt King) and Ryan (portrayed by Alex Kirk), who, following their 20th birthdays, decide to take a break from their routine lives. The series chronicles their adventures and misadventures, often resulting in chaos and hilarity.

== Main cast ==
- Emily Bevan as Anna
- David L.E. Davis as Dave
- Lucy McCall as Lucy
- Alex McGettigan as Alex
- James Shakeshaft as James
- Catherine Shepherd as Maya

== Main characters ==
=== Dave ===
Intelligent and socially awkward, Dave always argues with flatmate James.

=== James ===
James is like a big baby – friendly, but unpredictable when provoked. He owes money to Dave.

=== Alex ===
Alex, attractive and cocky, lacks a defined sense of self.

=== Lucy ===
Lucy considers herself independent but requires external validation.

=== Maya ===
Although Maya considers herself a free-spirited hippy, she appears uptight to others.

== Synopsis ==
Dave and James, who live on one side of the street, decide to make a spreadsheet detailing everything they owe each other. Meanwhile, Lucy and Alex, who live opposite of Dave and James, fall out over plans for Saturday night – ice skating or dinner party. A new girl named Maya moves into Lucy and Alex's flat, but soon questions what she has walked into. The light in the bathroom never works, and assertive control freak Lucy keeps causing trouble.

== Reception ==
- Review from Den of Geek.
