= Lady (2025 film) =

British comedy film

- Theatrical release poster
- Directed by: Samuel Abrahams
- Screenplay by: Samuel Abrahams; Miranda Campbell Bowling
- Produced by: Anna Mohr-Pietsch; Stewart Le Marechal
- Starring: Sian Clifford
- Cinematography: Korsshan Schlauer
- Music by: Jonny Woodley
- Production company: MetFilm Productions
- Distributed by: MetFilm Distribution
- Release dates: 16 October 2025 (BFI); 14 August 2026 (United Kingdom)
- Running time: 95 minutes
- Country: United Kingdom
- Language: English

Lady is a 2025 British satirical mockumentary film directed by Samuel Abrahams. It was written by Abrahams with Miranda Campbell Bowling, and has a cast led by Sian Clifford as the eponymous aristocratic lead character, Lady Isabella.

== Plot ==
Lady Isabella, a narcissistic member of the English aristocracy, hires a camera crew to film a documentary about her life at her large stately home. The director, Sam, struggles with the production when he learns that Isabella brought him in under the false promise of backing from Netflix. During filming, Isabella develops a mysterious condition which begins with her hands becoming invisible. As the invisibility spreads to the rest of her body, she and Sam form a friendship and sexual relationship, consuming alcohol and drugs together, all the while observed from the estate grounds by an inquisitive crow. When Sam learns that his filming has found favour with Netflix, Isabella becomes unhappy with Sam's rough cut and threatens suicide, rowing out into the lake naked and invisible with a shotgun.

After returning to the house, Isabella hosts Stately Stars, a philanthropic talent show event for underprivileged children, but determines to perform and win the contest herself. In a surreal culmination, she dresses in a crow outfit to perform an interpretive dance before doing a striptease to reveal her invisibility before an astounded audience. The next day, Sam and his crew depart the estate. Sam leaves behind storage drives containing the rushes for Isabell to edit herself.

== Cast ==
- Sian Clifford as Lady Isabella
- Juliet Cowan as Becky
- Laurie Kynaston as Sam
- Olisa Odele as Olivier

== Production ==
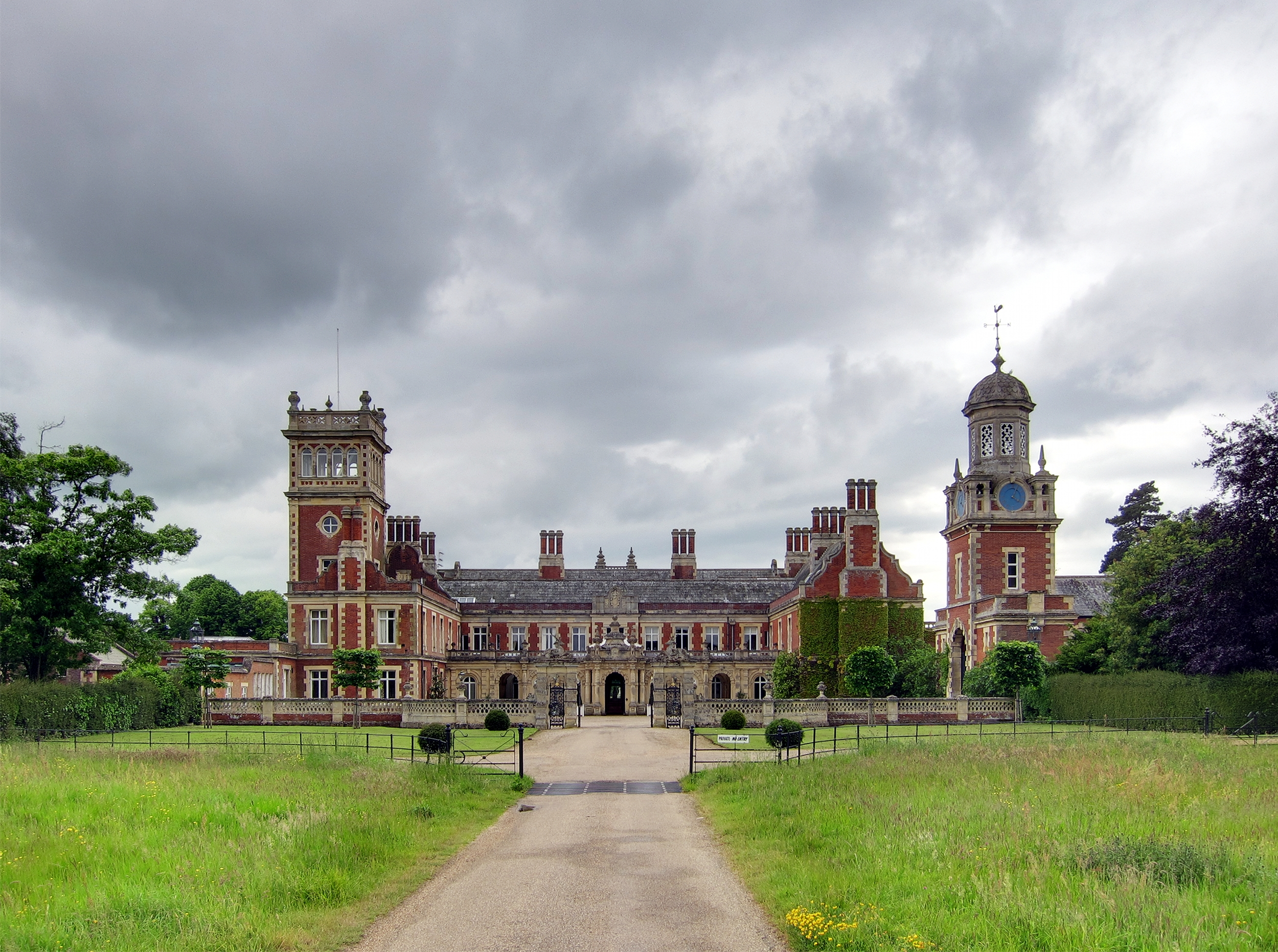
Location filming took place at Somerleyton Hall in Suffolk

The film is directed by Samuel Abrahams in his feature length directorial debut. Abrahams also co-wrote the film alongside Miranda Campbell Bowling. The film is produced by MetFilm Production with Anna Mohr-Pietsch and Stewart Le Marechal as producers. The score is by Jonny Woodley with production design from Agnieszka Dębska and cinematography from Korsshan Schlauer.

The cast is led by Sian Clifford and also includes Juliet Cowan, Laurie Kynaston and Olisa Odele.

Principal photography took place at Somerleyton Hall in Suffolk. First look images from filming were released in April 2025.

== Release ==
The film premiered at the 69th BFI London Film Festival on 16 October 2025. MetFilm Distribution released the film theatrically in the United Kingdom on 14 August 2026.

== Reception ==
Peter Bradshaw for The Guardian awarded the film four stars and praised the performance of Clifford, saying that the film delivered "laughs and unexpected tenderness" as well as being an "outrageous barnstormer”. Likening it to Emerald Fennell's 2023 film, Bradshaw stated that Lady was "like Saltburn on shrooms". Nikki Baughan for Screen Daily also praised the "memorable central performance” from Sian Clifford and the "impressive debut from Abrahams".
