= Safe House (TV series) =

British crime drama television series

- Genre: Crime drama
- Created by: Michael Crompton
- Starring: Christopher Eccleston; Marsha Thomason; Paterson Joseph; Jason Merrells; Nicola Stephenson; Christine Tremarco; Zoë Tapper; Peter Ferdinando
- Music by: Daniel Giorgetti (s. 1); Jon Opstad (s. 2)
- Country of origin: United Kingdom
- Original language: English
- No. of series: 2
- No. of episodes: 8 (list of episodes)

Production
- Executive producers: Jill Green; Paula Cuddy
- Producers: Andrew Benson; Susan Dunn
- Running time: 45 minutes
- Production company: Eleventh Hour Films

Original release
- Network: ITV
- Release: 20 April 2015 – 28 September 2017

Safe House is a British crime drama, broadcast on ITV, with the first series starring Christopher Eccleston and Marsha Thomason as the principal characters, Robert and Katy, who turn their beautiful picturesque guest house in the Lake District into a Safe House after being persuaded by one of Robert's former colleagues.

The first series of Safe House began broadcasting in April 2015, receiving favourable reviews and an impressive viewership. Leading to the development of a second season. Yet, Eccleston didn't return for the second season due to 'confidential' reasons, though it's believed he started working on it. This prompted a new cast and a new filming location, and the series premiered on September 7, 2017. Each series is made up of four episodes, each following a different set of guests who are forced to take refuge at the Safe House, whilst re-telling the story of how they came to arrive in the first place.

The first series was released on DVD on 25 May 2015. The second series was released on 20 November 2017.

== Plot ==
Former police officer Robert (Christopher Eccleston) and his wife, teacher Katy (Marsha Thomason) are approached by one of Robert's former colleagues, Mark (Paterson Joseph), who is looking for a remote location to offer as a safe house to a family who have been forced to go on the run. Robert reluctantly agrees, but finds himself drawn into a game of cat and mouse between a dangerous offender and the family he is trying to protect.

The first series was solely written by creator Michael Crompton, and directed by Marc Evans, known for his work on Hinterland and Collision. The second series was penned by the writing team of Ed Whitmore and Tracey Malone, both known for their work on Silent Witness, while Evans returned to direct.

== Cast ==
=== Main ===
==== Series 1 ====
- Christopher Eccleston as Robert Carmichael, a retired police detective
- Marsha Thomason as Katy Carmichael, Robert's wife and a teacher at the local school
- Paterson Joseph as DCI Mark Maxwell, a former colleague of Robert

==== Series 2 ====
- Stephen Moyer as Tom Broom, an ex-police officer
- Zoë Tapper as Sam Stenham, Tom's partner

=== Recurring ===
==== Series 1 ====
- Jason Merrells as David Blackwell
- Nicola Stephenson as Ali Blackwell
- Peter Ferdinando as Michael Collarsdale
- James Burrows as Sam Blackwell
- Harriet Cains as Louisa Blackwell
- Max True as Joe Blackwell
- Christine Tremarco as DS Becky Gallagher
- Sarah Smart as Megan

==== Series 2 ====
- Sunetra Sarker as DCI Jane Burr
- Gary Cargill as DI Oliver Vedder
- Ashley Walters as John Channing
- Stephen Lord as James Griffin
- Sacha Parkinson as Dani
- Joel MacCormack as Liam Duke
- Jason Watkins as Simon Duke

== Episode list ==
=== Series 1 (2015) ===
No.	Title	Directed by	Written by	Original release date	Viewers (millions)
1	"Episode 1"	Marc Evans	Michael Crompton	20 April 2015	8.44
Still haunted by his inability to save a witness some years earlier, retired policeman Robert and his wife Katy open a hotel in the Lake District and, at the request of his former colleague Mark, they turn it into a safe house. Their first guests are prison warder David Blackwell, his wife Ali and children Louisa and Joe, following the attempted abduction of little Joe at a fairground by a man calling himself Michael, who also stabbed a man to death who tried to intervene. The family has another son, student Sam, whose whereabouts are unclear and who does not seem keen to contact his parents. They fear that Michael will go after him to get to them and their fears appear to be justified.
2	"Episode 2"	Marc Evans	Michael Crompton	27 April 2015	7.24
Mark identifies the attacker as Michael Collersdale, an ex-convict and drug dealer, as the police locate Sam and bring him to the safe house. He tells Robert that he fell into manufacturing drugs but not for Collersdale, whom he does not recognize. David was a warder at a prison where Collersdale served time but also claims not to know him, though Robert is suspicious that David was receiving large money sums - which he explains away. The Blackwells learn their new identities - they are tourists from Manchester - but Collersdale invades their house, discovering associates he can threaten to get to them.
3	"Episode 3"	Marc Evans	Michael Crompton	4 May 2015	6.63
Ali's drug addicted sister Gemma is found dead in her flat after a visit by Collersdale and Robert is not convinced when Ali claims to have lost contact with her a long time ago. Eventually Ali admits that Joe is Gemma's son, adopted by Ali and David because of his mother's addiction, whilst Collersdale, breaking into the Blackwells' house, gets closer to locating them. At the same time Reynolds, who killed his wife Susan, leading to Robert's resignation, plans an appeal - alleging that the police withheld information at his trial. Mark shows Robert a CCTV film of him kissing Susan but Robert claims that it was platonic. Robert now wonders how Reynolds knew where to shoot at him and Susan and suspects a police officer told him.
4	"Episode 4"	Marc Evans	Michael Crompton	11 May 2015	6.78
As Collersdale finally catches up with David and his family, his motive for pursuing them becomes clear and it is down to Robert to save the day, following another attempt to abduct Joe. However, after the family return home, Robert still has an unanswered question regarding the death of witness Susan Reynolds, requiring a visit to her husband in prison and a showdown with the person who betrayed him and Susan.

=== Series 2 (2017) ===
No.	Title	Directed by	Written by	Original release date	Viewers (millions)
5	"Episode 1"	Marc Evans	Ed Whitmore	7 September 2017	5.09
6	"Episode 2"	Marc Evans	Ed Whitmore, Tracey Malone	14 September 2017	4.31
7	"Episode 3"	Marc Evans	Ed Whitmore, Tracey Malone	21 September 2017	4.23
8	"Episode 4"	Marc Evans	Ed Whitmore, Tracey Malone	28 September 2017	3.82
