= In the Flesh (TV series) =

2013 British supernatural drama television series

- Genre: Supernatural; Drama; Horror
- Created by: Dominic Mitchell
- Starring: Luke Newberry; Harriet Cains; Marie Critchley; Steve Cooper; Emmett J Scanlan; Emily Bevan; Stephen Thompson; Wunmi Mosaku; Gillian Waugh; Kevin Sutton; Gerard Thompson; Ricky Tomlinson; Kenneth Cranham; Steve Evets; Karen Henthorn; David Walmsley
- Country of origin: United Kingdom
- Original language: English
- No. of series: 2
- No. of episodes: 9

Production
- Executive producer: Hilary Martin
- Producer: Ann Harrison-Baxter

Original release
- Network: BBC Three; BBC HD (episodes 1 & 2)
- Release: 17 March 2013 – 8 June 2014

In the Flesh is a BBC Three supernatural drama series starring Luke Newberry. Written and created by Dominic Mitchell, the show began airing on BBC Three on 17 March 2013 with the first series consisting of three one-hour-long episodes. Set after "the Rising", which is the show's take on a zombie apocalypse, the drama focuses on a reanimated young man, Kieren Walker, and his return to his local community.

An extended second series of the show, consisting of six one-hour-long episodes, began airing in the United Kingdom on BBC Three on 4 May 2014 and in the United States on 10 May 2014 on BBC America.

In January 2015, BBC Three announced that In The Flesh would not be renewed for a third series due to cuts to its budget for its final year as a linear channel.

== Premise ==
The show, set in the fictional village of Roarton, Lancashire, though filmed in Marsden, West Yorkshire, depicts life several years after "the Rising". This period, in (fictional) 2010, was a time when thousands of people who had died in 2009 suddenly re-animated as mindless, homicidal, brain-eating zombies world-wide.

By the time of the series, normality has begun to return. A full-fledged zombie apocalypse has long since been prevented by armed resistance from the living, especially from armed local militias who patrolled their communities and actively hunted the re-animated. Meanwhile, a scientific solution for the zombie phenomenon has been found, with the development of a medication to restore consciousness to the undead, allowing them to remember their time alive and who they once were.

The surviving undead, not killed by the militias, have been rounded up, forcibly medicated, and entered in a government rehabilitation programme in a plan to reintroduce them to society. They are provided with contact lenses and cosmetics to help them conceal their deceased status, as well as injections of medication to keep them from relapsing into a dangerous or "rabid" state. They are officially referred to as sufferers of Partially Deceased Syndrome (PDS), though anti-zombie hardliners prefer the pejorative term "rotters". Many of the risen are haunted by memories of the atrocities they committed while rabid. In the village of Roarton, PDS sufferers face prejudice from the villagers upon their return.

== Cast ==
- Luke Newberry as Kieren "Kier" or "Ren" Walker, one of the many formerly rabid zombies who has been rehabilitated; he has since returned to his parents' home in the village of Roarton.
- Emily Bevan as Amy Dyer, a PDS sufferer who died of leukaemia at age 21. She meets and befriends Kieren and tries to convince him that their condition is a blessing.
- Harriet Cains as Jemima "Jem" Walker, Kieren Walker's sister and a member of the local militia, the Human Volunteer Force (HVF)
- Marie Critchley and Steve Cooper as Sue and Steve Walker, Kieren and Jemima's parents
- Emmett J Scanlan as Simon Monroe, a charismatic man and eventually Kieren's romantic interest, who has links with the Undead Liberation Army (ULA), he also serves as one of the twelve disciples of the mysterious Undead Prophet
- Stephen Thompson as Philip Wilson, a village councillor who later gets into trouble when he announces his romantic affection for certain PDS sufferers
- Wunmi Mosaku as Maxine Martin, the honourable Victus MP for Roarton
- Kevin Sutton as Gary Kendall, second-in-command and later commanding officer of the HVF Roarton village unit following the death of Bill Macy
- Gerard Thompson as Dean Halton or "Daz", an active member of the HVF
- Ricky Tomlinson as Ken Burton, a local man who initially appears to dislike those with PDS
- Kenneth Cranham as the widowed Vicar Oddie who runs the parish church and known well across the parish itself
- Steve Evets as Bill Macy, a senior member of the HVF and Rick's father
- Karen Henthorn as Janet Macy, Bill's wife and Rick's mother
- David Walmsley as Rick Macy, Kieren's best friend and past romantic interest, a young soldier who was killed by an IED in combat during the war in Afghanistan, and whose reanimated body was recovered by the army early on in the show
- Steve Garti as Duncan Lancaster
- Sandra Huggett as Shirley Wilson, Philip's mother and supporter of PDS sufferers
- Eve Gordon as Frankie King
- Jack North as Rob Carnforth
- Charlie Kenyon as Henry Lonsdale
- Paul Warriner as Tom Russo, Kieren's doctor
- Bryan Parry as Freddie Preston
- Francis Magee as Iain Monroe
- Steven Robertson as John Weston
- Sue Wallace as Maggie Burton
- Linzey Cocker as Haley Preston

== Episodes ==
=== Series 1 ===
No. overall	No. in series	Title	Directed by	Written by	Original release date	UK viewers (millions)
1	1	"Episode 1"	Jonny Campbell	Dominic Mitchell	17 March 2013	668,000
Kieren Walker, one of thousands of individuals affected by Partially Deceased Syndrome (PDS), returns home to Roarton. He has been subjected to months of rehabilitation and medication at a special, defended unit, specifically designed to keep the PDS sufferers in. The government has set an agenda of acceptance and tolerance. However, a cauldron of brutal anti-rotter sentiment is brewing and gaining support, especially within the church.
2	2	"Episode 2"	Jonny Campbell	Dominic Mitchell	24 March 2013	392,000
Kieren feels trapped at home and escapes to his grave, where he is reunited with his old hunting partner Amy Dyer, who persuades him to take a dangerous day trip. He discovers that Rick, his best friend whom he had a romantic interest in and was killed by an IED in Afghanistan, has also risen from the dead and been brought back to Roarton. Although Kieren's parents try to avoid telling him, he finds out and looks for Rick at the local pub with Amy. After an awkward reunion, in which him and Amy are discriminated against for being undead, he finds himself brought along on an impromptu hunting mission in the woods, where the night patrol has reported rabid rotters roaming free. Despite his status as a PDS sufferer, Rick appears determined to ignore this reality and go along with his father's belief that he "isn't like the others." Kieren persuades Rick and the others to hand the "rotters" in for a reward rather than kill them.
3	3	"Episode 3"	Jonny Campbell	Dominic Mitchell	31 March 2013	525,000
Kieren visits the supermarket where he used to hunt, which brings back memories of when Jem spared his life. The siblings then confront their past issues and drop in to see the Lancasters, parents of a girl he killed. Kieren begins to feel better, but must say goodbye to Amy, who is leaving Roarton in search of The Undead Prophet. At the end of the episode, tragedy strikes Kieren after Bill kills Rick, claiming he is not the real Rick, leaving the body leaning against Kieren's garage. Kieren storms in to confront Bill, but ultimately leaves. Bill is then shot by Ken Burton, whose PDS-afflicted wife was murdered by Bill at the end of the first episode.

=== Series 2 ===
No. overall	No. in series	Title	Directed by	Written by	Original release date	UK viewers (millions)
4	1	"Episode 1"	Jim O'Hanlon	Dominic Mitchell	4 May 2014	364,000
Kieren Walker, in the now seemingly PDS-friendly world of Roarton, is keeping his head down, working soul destroying shifts in the Legion pub and squirrelling money into his 'escape fund'. The only problem is that he can't escape himself. In the wider world, tensions are re-igniting. The radical pro-living party, Victus, is whipping up hatred and the Undead Liberation Army is retaliating violently. When Victus MP Maxine Martin enters Roarton, Kieren is dismayed, sensing that danger is encroaching. And when Vicar Oddie violently clashes with her, it seems Kieren's instincts are right. Kieren is also overjoyed by the return of his BDFF (best dead friend forever), Amy Dyer, though his delight is cut short by a tense encounter with Amy's opinionated beau, ULA member Simon. When Amy and Simon reveal the prejudice still bubbling under the surface in Roarton, Kieren knows he needs to leave the village immediately.
5	2	"Episode 2"	Jim O'Hanlon	Dominic Mitchell	11 May 2014	297,000
Kieren's dreams of escape are left in tatters when Maxine imposes an Undead travel ban on Roarton, also introducing stringent measures for PDS Sufferers to pay back their debt to society; Kieren had almost succeeded in leaving for France, but due to Amy (who never bothers to look human) bothering him when he attempted to get a train ticket, he was refused. However, being thrust together with Simon on Maxine's 'Give Back' scheme has its benefits. The two form a connection, and Kieren agrees to go to Simon's Undead party that night, where Simon makes a surprising declaration. Jem is troubled at school. A 19-year-old amongst 16-year-olds, she feels completely alienated, until she's revealed to be an ex-HVF war hero. Jem's reputation soars and she is befriended by the popular girls. However, when a PDS prank goes wrong, resulting in a terrifying rabid in the corridors, Jem is humiliated in front of her classmates. She gravitates towards Gary, finding solace in a world she understands - hunting rabids in the woods. But it's here that disaster strikes, when Jem accidentally shoots and kills an undead classmate.
6	3	"Episode 3"	Damon Thomas	Fintan Ryan & John Jackson	18 May 2014	367,000
Fate throws Kieren and Simon together on the ‘Give Back’ scheme, this time at the doctor’s surgery. Simon reassures Kieren that he’s not leading Amy on, but the pair come to blows when Kieren thwarts his plan to free two caged rabids. Hoping to get Kieren to see things his way, Simon tells him that Maxine's "Give Back" plan is a lie; zombies will be forced to do "free labor" indefinitely, never receiving the certificate that will allow them to be recognized as real citizens again. We also get to know PDS sufferer Freddie Preston. Freddie returned from the grave to find his childhood sweetheart Haley shacked up in their marital home with her new boyfriend Amir. Haley and Amir are allowing Freddie to stay in the spare room until he’s back on his feet. This is not ideal, as Freddie struggles with the notion of ‘till death do us part’ and is determined to win back the woman he loves. When Kieren is thrust into the aftermath of Freddie’s plan, he sees Simon’s views in a different light. Even though he hates the thought of hurting Amy, he can’t help but follow his heart.
7	4	"Episode 4"	Damon Thomas	Fintan Ryan	25 May 2014	112,000
Kieren is conflicted about seeing Simon behind Amy’s back and frustrated by his cult leader persona around the adoring Undead of Roarton. However, Simon proves how much he cares by stepping into Kieren’s world and having Sunday lunch at the Walkers’. Unfortunately, Amy witnesses the loved-up pair en route to Kieren’s house and is crushed by their betrayal. After a positive start, the Sunday lunch descends into chaos. A tipsy and trouble-making Jem and Gary descend on the meal, provoking Kieren into a confession which sends shockwaves around the family - and astounds Simon. Philip can’t reconcile himself with Maxine’s questionable politics and the two go head to head. Seeing Philip as a thorn in her side, Maxine orchestrates his downfall and is delighted when his Undead perversion is publicly revealed. Philip’s political aspirations come tumbling down around him, but a silver lining is provided by an unexpected romantic encounter.
8	5	"Episode 5"	Alice Troughton	Dominic Mitchell	1 June 2014	260,000
Kieren is wrongly accused of freeing rabids held at the hospital and is placed under house arrest with a view to returning him to the Treatment Centre in Norfolk unless he confesses; he is being scapegoated, so someone can be held accountable. With no support from the family (who wrongly believe he has taken on the views of the ULA) he seeks out Simon, but Amy tells him that Simon has gone to the city. Amy continues to date Philip, secretly fearing she may becoming resistant to the drugs that keep her from descending into her rabid state; however, when she begins to feel the rain on her skin, she realises that she is actually coming back to life instead. In the city Simon has received orders from the Undead Prophet to slay Kieren, in the belief that his demise will trigger the second rising; current evidence points to Kieren being the First Risen - the first zombie to rise. Struggling to reconcile this with his feelings for Keiren, Simon remembers his time at Norfolk, where he was the first of the Risen to respond to medical treatment and stop being rabid. However, he learned he had killed his mother while rabid, and his father's rejection of him drove him to join the ULA.
9	6	"Episode 6"	Alice Troughton	Dominic Mitchell	8 June 2014	299,000
Kieren has been locked in his room and awaits transfer to Norfolk under guard but, with Simon returning to lead his followers in a Second Rising, Gary kidnaps Kieren and tries to force Kieren to help find him. At the village fete Amy is transforming into a human while on a date with Phillip. Militant PDS sufferers have a stand-off in the graveyard against Jem and armed townsfolk who had been on a march along the bounds of the town. Gary brings Kieren near the graveyard and forcibly drugs Kieren, turning him rabid and setting him loose, hoping to have Jem shoot him. Kieren tries to tie himself to a gravestone before going rabid and passes out; his sister threatens the militant PDS sufferers with her gun to clear a path to the graveyard and witnesses Kieren waking up rabid. While Jem defensively aims her gun at Kieren, Kieren’s father approaches Kieren. Amidst objections he insists that he won’t be hurt as Kieren struggles against the effects of drugs. Everyone watches anxiously and one of the townspeople points their gun Kieren as he grabs his father’s shirt. Simon watches on conflicted as Kieren fights the urge to hurt his father and the clocktower strikes twelve; however, Simon ultimately rejects his ULA orders and takes a bullet to save Kieren from being shot by the townsfolk. Kieren snaps out of his rabid state, happy he didn't hurt anyone. In the old graveyard Maxine, who had believed Amy to be the real First Risen, murders her shortly after Amy becomes fully human again; Maxine desperately hopes that a Second Rising will revive her late brother. When this fails to trigger another Rising, Maxine has a public breakdown and attempts to murder another PDS sufferer, discrediting herself. However, this gives hope to other PDS sufferers that one day they could fully become human again. Amy is reburied, but that night her body is dug up by government workers wanting to know how she came back to life.

== Reception ==
In the Flesh received generally positive reviews, with praise being given to the series' premise. The Daily Telegraph's Simon Horsford praised Mitchell and called the premise "a clever idea", despite having initial misgivings over the continued use of zombies. Morgan Jeffery, writing for Digital Spy, called the idea a "risk". Comparisons were made between the show and previous shows aired on BBC Three: The Fades and Being Human.

The series launched with 668,000 viewers, the highest of all the episodes. The first episode was rated 3 out of 5 stars by Digital Spy reviewer Morgan Jeffery. Jeffery praised the performance of the actors and the cinematography, particularly highlighting the scene where Ken's wife is shot. However, he noted that there were times when "the two facets of In The Flesh fail to gel effectively". Overall, he believed it may not have "hit its stride" in the first week, but would continue to watch the show for the next two weeks. Den of Geek's Louisa Mellor also highlighted the scene with Ken's wife, and praised the episode. She said the story had a "reflective" feel, which distinguished it from other zombies stories.

The second episode received 392,000 viewers, a significant decrease from the first episode. However, critical response to the episode improved, and Jeffery rated the second episode 4 out of 5. He praised the banter between Kieren and Amy, as well as the appearance of rabid zombies toward the end. Mellor called Amy a "jolt of electricity on screen", and wanted to learn more about the thoughts of Bill Macy. Dave Golder, for SFX, also gave the episode 4 out of 5, and praised the episode's conclusion and rabid PDS sufferers. Golder felt Amy was occasionally "a little bit too broad", but praised her acting when Kieren reveals he killed himself.

525,000 viewers watched the season finale, an increase from the previous episode but still not as high as the first one. Jeffery rated the episode 3.5 out of 5; he praised Cains and her interaction with Newberry, and the death of Rick, but noted that many plots were left unresolved.

== Awards ==
The series won the BAFTA TV Award for Best Mini-Series in May 2014. Series creator Dominic Mitchell was awarded a BAFTA for 'Best Writer - Drama' at the British Academy Television Craft Awards ceremony on 27 April 2014.

The series was nominated for the GLAAD Media Award for Outstanding TV Movie or Limited Series.

== See also ==
- The Returned
- The Cured
