= Ben Charles Edwards =

British film director, producer and writer

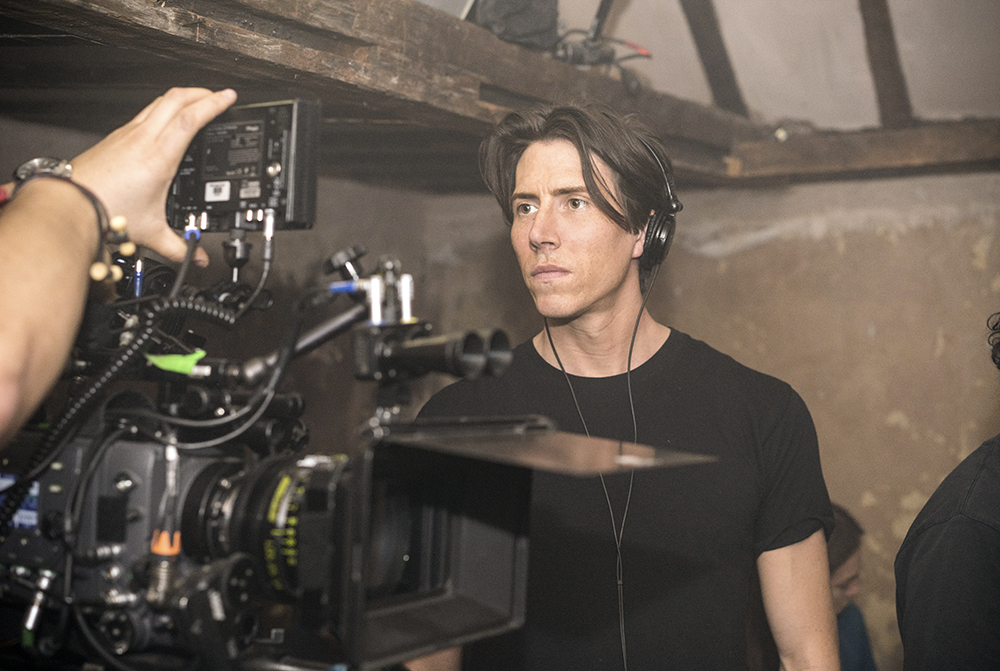
- Born: London, England
- Occupations: Director, writer, producer
- Known for: Quant, Father Of Flies, The Wheels of Heaven aka Devils Play

Ben Charles Edwards is a British film director, producer and writer. Edwards began his career working as a photographer. Upon the release of his feature debut, the British Film Institute remarked that “Charles Edwards has crafted distinctive, admirable work that seems to have emerged from the unseen margins of British cinema.”

He is best known for directing Set the Thames on Fire (2016), Father of Flies (2022), Quant (2021), and Devils Play (2023). Edwards is the co-founder of the auteur-driven production company Dreamtown. In 2025, Edwards co-founded the Cine International Film Festival (CIFF), described as “the Punk Cannes” and “the most exciting thing to happen to London cinema in years.” He has written for the Evening Standard, and his films have received international awards for direction, score, sound design, and feature excellence.

== Career ==
=== Early work ===
Edwards began as a photographer before transitioning into short films and feature films. His early projects include the musical short The Town That Boars Me (2008), the fashion short Giles for Vogue Italia, and the shorts Suzie Lovitt (2012), Dotty (2013), and Animal Charm (2011), featuring actors such as Boy George, Sadie Frost, and Sally Phillips. Dotty earned Sadie Frost the Best Actress award at the Hollywood Independent Film Festival and was shown at 18 international festivals including Raindance.

He later directed Will Nature Make a Man of Me Yet?, also known as Motel Monologues, featuring a female cast performing monologues written for men. The film premiered at the Pompidou Centre and earned nominations for Best Director and Best Picture at the Bokeh Film Festival.

=== Feature films ===
- Set the Thames on Fire (2016)* – Edwards’ feature debut dark fantasy, written by Al Joshua and starring Noel Fielding, Sally Phillips, and Lily Loveless. It was long-listed for British Independent Film Awards and nominated for “Best New Debut Film” at the BFI London Comedy Film Festival.
- Father of Flies (2018)* – A psychological horror starring Camilla Rutherford, Davi Santos, and Nicholas Tucci, with score by Orri Páll Dýrason. It won Best Feature Film at the Buenos Aires International Film Festival and awards for Best Score and Best Sound Design at the Paris International Film Festival.
- A Bird Flew In (2020)* – A black-and-white vérité-style film shot during the 2020 COVID-19 lockdown, starring Derek Jacobi, Jeff Fahey, Morgana Robinson, and Camilla Rutherford. It was among the first UK feature productions to resume post-lockdown and was nominated for Best UK Feature at Raindance.
- Quant (2021)* – Produced by Edwards and directed by Sadie Frost, this documentary about Mary Quant premiered at the BFI London Film Festival.
- The Wheels of Heaven aka Devils Play (2024)* – Starring Mickey Rourke, Gary Stretch, and Geoff Bell, the film—shot in the US, UK, and Bulgaria—explores a young girl's encounter with a boy claiming to be the fallen angel, Lucifer. However, the Devil is not purely evil, more of a cosmic accountant, balancing scales, punishing hypocrisy, and granting mercy when deserved. Described by Edwards as “a tense thriller... a love letter to the Devil,”. The film won two Festival Awards at the 2024 Capri Hollywood Film Festival and a further two awards at the Ischia Global Film Festival 2025.
- Savage Flowers (2024)* – Written and produced by Edwards via Dreamtown; world premiered at CIFF and praised as “incredibly powerful.”
- Video Killed the Radio Star (film) (2025/TBA)* – A 1970s-set horror co-created and produced by Edwards under his Dreamtown banner, starring Harriet Cains and Luke Brandon Field.
- Don't Forget Me (TBA)* – The official Eddie Cochran documentary produced by Edwards profiling stars such as Keith Richards, Sting, Yungblud, Ronnie Wood, and Billy Idol.

== Controversy surrounding The Wheels of Heaven aka Devils Play ==
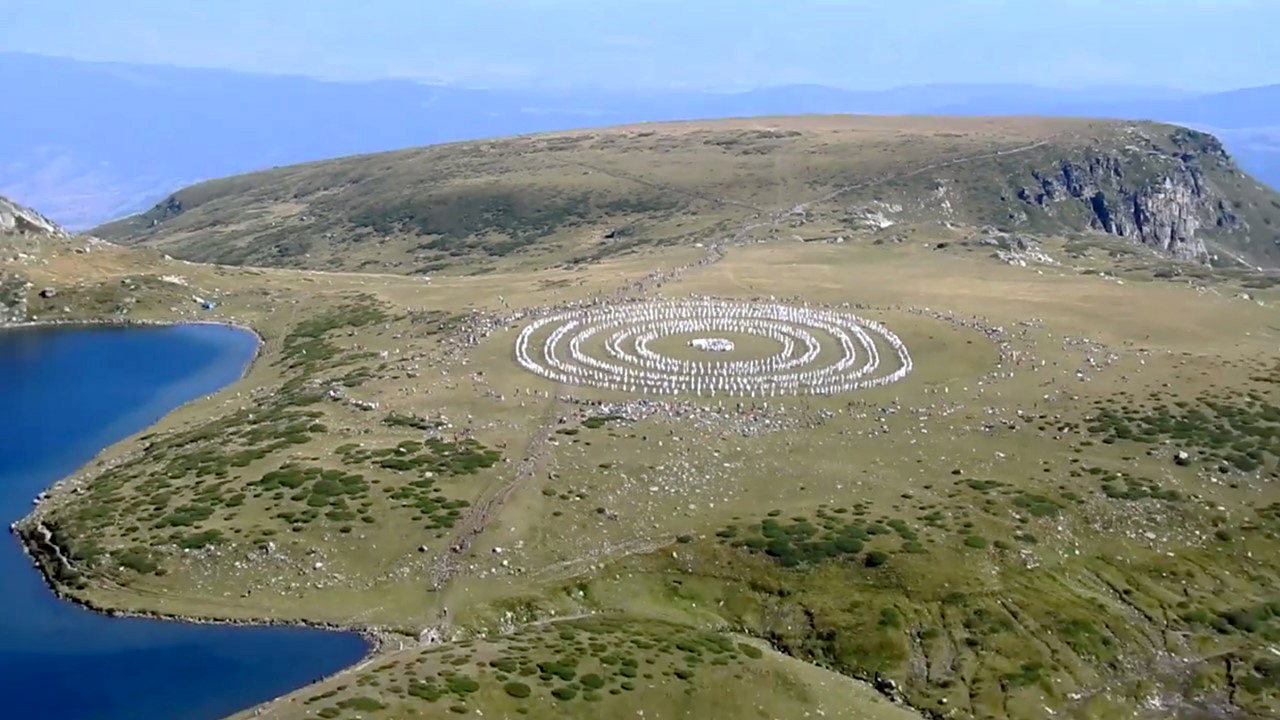
People performing Paneurhythmy in the Rila Mountains, Bulgaria

Upon its release in February 2025, Devil's Play received significant backlash regarding “satanic overtones” from members of the White Brotherhood (followers of Peter Dunov), who objected to both the film's title and the use of paneurhythmy footage shot by Edwards. They claimed that the sacred philosophical dance was portrayed as part of “devil's games”, and that its inclusion in the film occurred without the permission of the Brotherhood's leadership. The original title The Wheels of Heaven had been officially approved for distribution, but the film was marketed and released in Bulgaria under the title Devil's Games, which the Brotherhood described as offensive and in conflict with their spiritual principles.

Although the group initially protested and sought to halt the film's premiere, they later acknowledged that they lacked legal standing to file a lawsuit and that all permissions and uses had been met. Separately, several lawyers submitted a complaint to the National Film Center and the Ministry of Culture, citing violations of the Film Industry Act. Their objection centered on the title change, as well as alleged promotion of violence and religious intolerance through “satanic overtones” and the depiction of cultural and spiritual landmarks, including paneurhythmy, in what they deemed an unacceptable context. The complainants requested that the Ministry of Culture investigate and impose sanctions if the violations were confirmed; while not expecting distribution to be halted, they advised vulnerable audiences to refrain from viewing the film.

=== Journalism ===
In May 2025, Edwards authored Dear Filmmakers: Stop Waiting for Permission in the Evening Standard, advocating for risk-taking in indie film.

He also responded to proposed US 100% tariffs on non-US films, speaking on BBC Radio about how they might diminish global storytelling, and deepened his commentary in Producers and Freelancers Could Be Jobless If Trump Applies Film Tariff.

He also penned Indie Film Isn't Dead—It Just Got Lost in the Algorithm, highlighting CIFF's mission.

=== Cine International Film Festival (CIFF) ===
Edwards co-founded CIFF in 2025. The London-based festival celebrates independent voices and supports emerging filmmakers via a bursary with Goldfinch Academy. It featured jurors such as Asia Argento, Paul Oakenfold, Sadie Frost, and Roger Daltrey, and was praised by the press as “the Punk Cannes”.

== Awards and nominations ==
Year	Festival	Work	Category	Result
2016	British Independent Film Awards	Set The Thames on Fire	Best Debut Feature	Shortlisted
2021	Raindance Film Festival	A Bird Flew In	Best UK Feature	Nominated
2021	Raindance Film Festival (Screamdance)	Father of Flies	Screamdance Award	Nominated
2022	Buenos Aires International Film Festival	Father of Flies	Best Feature Film	Won
2022	Paris International Film Festival	Father of Flies	Best Score	Won
2022	Paris International Film Festival	Father of Flies	Best Sound Design	Won
2022	Director International Film Festival (WDIFF)	A Bird Flew In	Best Feature Film	Won
2022	Roosevelt Island Film Festival	A Bird Flew In	Best International Feature Film	Won
2022	Central Alberta Film Festival	A Bird Flew In	Best Feature Narrative	Nominated
2023	Sevilla Indie Film Festival	A Bird Flew In	Best Feature Film (Silver Award)	Nominated
2024	Capri Hollywood Film Festival	The Wheels of Heaven	Festival Award	Won
2024	Capri Hollywood Film Festival	The Wheels of Heaven	Festival Award	Won
2025	Ischia Global Film Festival	The Wheels of Heaven	Festival Award	Won
2025	Ischia Global Film Festival	The Wheels of Heaven	Festival Award	Won
2025	New York Chelsea Film Festival	The Wheels of Heaven	Best Cinematography	Won

== Filmography ==
- Set the Thames on Fire (2016) – Writer, Director
- Father of Flies (2018) – Writer, Director
- A Bird Flew In (2020) – Producer
- Quant (2021) – Producer
- The Wheels of Heaven AKA Devils Play (2024) – Writer, Director, Executive Producer (in association with Dreamtown)
- Savage Flowers (2024) – Writer, Producer (produced under Dreamtown)
- Video Killed the Radio Star (2025 TBA) – Creator, Producer (produced under Dreamtown)
- Don't Forget Me (TBA) – Producer
