= Dominic Mitchell =

English playwright and screenwriter

- Born: 20 December 1979 (age 46); Lancashire, England, UK
- Occupations: Playwright, screenwriter

Dominic Mitchell is an English playwright and screenwriter. He is the creator and writer of the BBC 3 television series In the Flesh.

== Education ==
Mitchell studied BA (Hons) Film & Video at the Surrey Institute of Art & Design in Farnham (now the University for the Creative Arts).

== Career ==
=== Theatre ===
In 2009 Mitchell won the Papatango script competition with his darkly comic play "Potentials". Whatsonstage.com called it a "sharply observed satire…truly tense with an utterly gripping climax". His short play "No. 30 to Pluto" was joint winner of the Churchill Theatre's new writing competition and was performed on the main stage as part of their 30th Birthday Gala celebrations. In 2023, Mitchell founded his own Manchester theatre company, Halperin and Weston Productions.

=== Television ===
In 2013 he was selected as one of BAFTA's 'Breakthrough Brits'.

In the Flesh first aired on BBC Three on 17 March 2013. The first series comprised three hour-long episodes. An extended second series comprising six hour-long episodes was aired in the United Kingdom from 4 May 2014 and from 10 May 2014 on BBC America. The series was cancelled in 2015 due to funding cuts to BBC Three's budget. He won the Best Writer award at the 2014 BAFTA TV Craft awards for In The Flesh, which went on to win 'Best Mini Series' at the 2014 BAFTA awards. In response to fan interest, Mitchell set up a Go Fund Me page in 2022 to write scripts for a 'third series'.

Mitchell wrote the fifth episode of the HBO science fiction show Westworld with Lisa Joy and was a supervising producer on the show's first season. In 2016, it was announced Mitchell was developing Creature, a horror thriller inspired by Slender Man.
