= Emily Bevan =

English actress (born 1982)

- Born: Emily Grace Bevan; 11 August 1982 (age 44); Shrewsbury, Shropshire, England
- Education: Royal Central School of Speech and Drama
- Occupation: Actress
- Years active: 2004–present

Emily Grace Bevan (born 11 August 1982) is an English actress. She is best known for her roles in The Casual Vacancy and In the Flesh.

== Early life and education ==
Bevan was born in Shrewsbury, Shropshire. Her father was headmaster of a boys' school and mother is a midwife. She is the youngest of four children. She attended the Royal Central School of Speech and Drama and received a Master of Arts degree in classical acting.

== Filmography ==
=== Film ===
Year	Title	Role	Notes
2007	Between the Lines	Anna	Short film
2007	St. Trinian's	Female Inspector	
2009	Life Coach	Dominique	Short film
2010	One Man and His Dog	Announcer	Short film
2010	Timber!	Emily	Short film
2013	It Won't Be You	Bonnie	
2014	The Last Sparks of Sundown	Lucy Fairweather	
2014	Testament of Youth	Convalescent Nurse	
2015	No Strings	Emily	Short film
2016	The Carer	Wanda	
2016	Dawn of the Deaf	Claire	Short film
2016	Crow	Jill	
2016	The Night Before Friday	Isabelle	Short film
2017	Williams	Ginny Williams	
2017	Breathe	Nurse Margaret	
2018	The Short of It	Woman	Short film

=== Television ===
Year	Title	Role	Notes
2010	Hung Out	Anna	
2010	Phoneshop	Amanda	Episode: "Never on a Tuesday"
2012	The Thick of It	Tara Strachan	Episode #4.3
2012	Comedy Blaps	Date Girl	Episode: "Cumbo: Episode 2"
2013	Russell Howard's Good News	Russell's Wife	
2013–2014	In the Flesh	Amy Dyer	9 episodes
2015	The Casual Vacancy	Mary Fairbrother	3 episodes
2015	The Ark	Salit	TV film
2015	Doc Martin	Dr Rachel Timoney	8 episodes
2017	Uncle	Jasmine	Episode: "Dinner, I Hardly Knew Her"
2017	Grantchester	Hilary Franklin	4 episodes
2017	I Live with Models	Diane	Episode: "The Hook-Up"
2020	Soulmates	Adele	Episode: "Watershed"
2021	Midsomer Murders	Naomi Ashworth/Bryony Hayden	Episode: "Scarecrow Murders"
2021	Domina	Herrenia	Episode: "Rise"
2021	Temple	Rebecca	3 episodes
2023	Funny Woman	Edith Mahindra	3 episodes
2023	The Full Monty	Yvonne	2 episodes

=== Theatre ===
Year	Title	Role	Theatre	Location
2004	Swing Fever	Singer	Newcastle City Hall	Newcastle, United Kingdom
2010	Plucker	Alexis	Southwark Playhouse	London, United Kingdom
2011	The Old Man and the Sea	The Sea	Riverside Studios	London, United Kingdom
2015	The Haunting of Hill House	Eleanor	Liverpool Playhouse	Liverpool, United Kingdom

=== Video games ===
Year	Title	Role
2016	Dragon Quest Heroes II	Erinn (English version, voice)
2022	Lego Star Wars: The Skywalker Saga	Voice

=== Audio-book narrator ===
Release year	Book Title	Book Author
2013	Helga's Diary: A Young Girl's Account of Life in a Concentration Camp	Helga Hošková-Weissová
2015	Lockwood & Co., Book 3: The Hollow Boy	Jonathan Stroud
2016	Lockwood & Co., Book 4: The Creeping Shadow	Jonathan Stroud
2017	Lockwood & Co., Book 5: The Empty Grave	Jonathan Stroud
