= Comedy Lab =

British television series

- Genre: Comedy
- Created by: Laurence Rickard; George Sawyer
- Country of origin: United Kingdom
- Original language: English
- No. of series: 12
- No. of episodes: 102 episodes

Production
- Running time: 25 minutes
- Production company: Channel 4

Original release
- Network: Channel 4/E4
- Release: 9 November 1998 – 13 November 2011

Comedy Lab is a British television series which showcases pilots of experimental comedy shows. Series have been aired irregularly on Channel 4 and E4 since 1998.

Several pilots first shown on Comedy Lab have gone on to spawn full series, most notably Trigger Happy TV, Fonejacker, That Peter Kay Thing, Meet the Magoons and FM. It also gave Jimmy Carr his first television appearance in Jimmy Carr's World of…Corporate Videos.

The 2001 series featured the episodes Knife and Wife (featuring Kevin Eldon), Orcadia (featuring Alice Lowe), Daydream Believers: Brand New Beamer (featuring David Mitchell and Robert Webb) and Jimmy Carr's World of…Corporate Videos featuring Jimmy Carr.

The 2008 series featured the episodes Headwreckers (featuring David McSavage), Mr and Mrs Fandango, Olivia Lee's Naughty Bits, Karl Pilkington: Satisfied Fool, Pappy's Fun Club, School of Comedy and Slaterwood.

2010's shows were iCandy, Happy Finish, Penelope Princess of Pets, Jack Whitehall Secret Census, Filth, Moviemash and Hung Out.

The 2011 lineup included: Anna & Katy (featuring Anna Crilly and Katy Wix), Totally Tom (featuring Anna Popplewell) and Rick and Peter (featuring Rick Edwards).

== See also ==
- Comedy Showcase
