= Luke Brandon Field =

English actor

- Born: 21 March 1988 (age 38); Westminster, London, England
- Occupation: Actor
- Years active: 2006–present

Luke Brandon Field (born 21 March 1988) is an English actor. He is known for playing Christoph in Taika Waititi's film Jojo Rabbit (2019), Alberto Falcone in The Flash (2023), and the younger version of Daniel Molloy in the AMC television series Interview with the Vampire (2022–2024).

Field has also been cast as Herman Rarebell, drummer of the German rock band Scorpions, in the biographical film Wind of Change.

== Career ==
Field began acting in the 2000s and appeared in British and American independent film productions before gaining wider recognition through supporting roles in major films.

In 2019, he appeared as Christoph in Taika Waititi's satirical comedy-drama Jojo Rabbit.

=== The Flash ===
In 2023, Field appeared in the DC Extended Universe superhero film The Flash as Alberto Falcone, a member of the Falcone crime family.

The character originated in the comic-book series Batman: The Long Halloween. Field discussed drawing on the comics when developing his interpretation of Falcone, whose appearance in The Flash marked the character's live-action feature-film debut.

=== Interview with the Vampire ===
Field portrayed the younger version of journalist Daniel Molloy in AMC's adaptation of Anne Rice's The Vampire Chronicles, Interview with the Vampire. Eric Bogosian portrays Molloy in the contemporary timeline.

Field first appeared as the younger Daniel during flashbacks to the character's original 1973 interview with the vampire Louis de Pointe du Lac, played by Jacob Anderson. He returned in the second season, in which the circumstances surrounding the original interview became a significant part of the storyline.

Field had a prominent role in the second-season episode "Don't Be Afraid, Just Start the Tape", which reconstructs the 1973 interview and reveals previously suppressed events involving Daniel, Louis and the vampire Armand, played by Assad Zaman.

In preparing to portray the younger version of Bogosian's character, Field studied Bogosian's performance while avoiding a direct imitation. Field and Bogosian independently used musician Lou Reed as an influence when developing their respective versions of Daniel.

Bogosian said that during the casting process he was shown several actors being considered to portray the younger Daniel and recommended Field, whom he considered the strongest candidate. Field subsequently studied aspects of Bogosian's speech and mannerisms while developing the character, while also researching the cultural and political environment of the United States in the early 1970s.

Field described filming "Don't Be Afraid, Just Start the Tape" as an unusually intense experience. Showrunner Rolin Jones encouraged Field, Anderson and Zaman to approach the flashback material like an off-Broadway play, with much of the episode filmed in sequence.

Field did not reprise the role in the third season, The Vampire Lestat. In May 2026, Jones said that Field could potentially return if the series continued beyond its third season.

=== Later work ===
Field was cast opposite Harriet Cains in the horror film Video Killed the Radio Star. Set in 1979, the film follows a pirate radio DJ whose broadcast unleashes a supernatural entity.

In 2025, Field was announced as part of the principal cast of Wind of Change, a biographical film about the German rock band Scorpions. Field portrays drummer Herman Rarebell, alongside Alexander Dreymon as Rudolf Schenker, Ludwig Trepte as Klaus Meine, Ed Speleers as Matthias Jabs, David Kross as Francis Buchholz and Dominic West as the band's manager Doc McGhee.

Production on Wind of Change began at Warner Bros. Studios, Leavesden in England in 2025.

== Selected filmography ==
=== Film ===
Year	Title	Role	Notes
2006	Alien Autopsy	Steve	Uncredited
2011	Lotus Eaters		
2011	Where the Road Meets the Sun	Guy	
2019	Jojo Rabbit	Christoph	
2023	The Flash	Alberto Falcone	
2027	Wind of Change	Herman Rarebell	
TBA	Video Killed the Radio Star	Jim	

=== Television ===
Year	Title	Role	Notes
2022–2024	Interview with the Vampire	Young Daniel Molloy	Recurring role
