= Jon Opstad =

British Composer

Jon Opstad (born 1983) is a British composer. His work spans music for film and television, contemporary dance, concert music and album projects. He has collaborated with other artists, such as Max Richter. Opstad is classically trained, having studied music at Cambridge University, before graduating with an MA in film composition from the National Film and Television School.

In television, Opstad is best known for his scores for dark dramas such as Netflix's Bodies and Black Mirror. His score with Max Richter for Elisabeth Moss thriller The Veil was acclaimed by IndieWire as one of "The Best TV Scores of 2024".

Opstad's 2014 contemporary dance score Ignis was nominated for a British Composer Award (since rebranded as Ivors Classical Awards) for "Best Stage Work". Tracks from Ignis have been used extensively in other productions, with the composition "Ignis IV" featuring in the trailer for Hollywood feature film Ad Astra, a trailer for Amazon Prime series The Lord of the Rings: Rings of Power, and the drama series The Veil. The track "Ignis I" was featured in the opening episode of Paramount drama series The Man Who Fell To Earth.

In 2021, Opstad was featured as an answer to a question on the long-running British TV game show Mastermind, as part of a specialist round on Black Mirror. Opstad has been quoted on his approach to scoring the Black Mirror episodes White Bear and White Christmas in the official book on the series written by Charlie Brooker, Annabel Jones and Jason Arnopp, Inside Black Mirror

In 2015 the WNYC radio show New Sounds, presented by John Schaefer, focussed an episode on Opstad's music. Opstad's music has also featured on BBC Radio 3 programmes Late Junction, In Tune and Unclassified amongst others.

== Filmography ==
=== Television ===
Year	Title	Studio	Notes
2013	Silent Witness (series 16)	BBC	co-composed with Sheridan Tongue
2013	Black Mirror (episode White Bear)	Channel 4/Netflix	
2014	Black Mirror (episode White Christmas)	Channel 4/Netflix	
2015	Cyberbully	Channel 4	
2016	The Murder Detectives	Channel 4	
2016	Louis Theroux: Savile	BBC	
2017	Safe House (season 2)	ITV	
2018	The Woman In White	BBC	
2019	The Feed	Amazon Prime Video	
2020	We Hunt Together	BBC	
2021	Surviving 9/11	BBC	
2022	We Hunt Together (season 2)	BBC	
2022	Trainwreck: Woodstock '99	Netflix	
2023	Bodies	Netflix	
2024	The Veil	FX/Hulu/Disney+	co-composed with Max Richter

=== Film ===
Year	Title	Director	Notes
2010	Uncle David	David Hoyle	co-composed with Richard Thomas
2012	A World Not Ours	Mahdi Fleifel	
2014	Theeb	Naji Abu Nowar	(additional music)
2014	X+Y	Morgan Matthews	(additional music)
2022	Merkel	Eva Weber	

=== Games ===
Year	Title	Studio	Notes
2018-present	Tom Clancy's Rainbow Six Siege	Ubisoft	composer from Year 3 onwards of the game

== Discography ==
=== Albums ===
Title	Album details
Still Picture	Released: 2005; Label: New Canvas Records; Formats: CD, digital
Interpretations	Released: 2007; Label: New Canvas Records; Formats: CD, digital
Ignis	Released 2014; Label: New Canvas Records; Format: digital
Extensions: Music for Computer-Controlled Prepared Piano	Released 2022; Label: Tip Top Recordings; Formats: CD, digital

=== Singles ===
Title	Single Details
Blue Sky, White Clouds	Released 2020; Label: Deutsche Grammophon; Formats: vinyl (as part of Project XII 2020 album), digital

=== Soundtrack Albums ===
Title	Album details
Black Mirror: White Bear (Original Television Soundtrack)	Released: 2013; Label: self released; Format: digital
Black Mirror: White Christmas (Original Television Soundtrack)	Released: 2014; Label: self released; Format: digital
Safe House Series 2 (Original Television Soundtrack)	Released: 2017; Label: Manners McDade; Format: digital
The Woman In White (Original Television Soundtrack)	Released: 2021; Label: Manners McDade; Format: digital
Surviving 9/11 (Original Motion Picture Soundtrack)	Released: 2021; Label: Manners McDade; Format: digital
The Feed (Original Television Soundtrack)	Released: 2021; Label: Studio Lambert; Format: digital
Bodies (Soundtrack from the Netflix Series)	Released: 2023; Label: Netflix Music; Format: digital
The Veil (Original Soundtrack)	Released: 2024; Label: Hollywood Records; Format: digital
