= Amaka Okafor =

British actress

- Born: Sally Amaka Okafor; Birmingham, England
- Education: Liverpool John Moores University
- Years active: 2004–present
- Children: 1

Sally Amaka Okafor is a British actress. She is known for her work in theatre, and her roles in the film Greatest Days (2023) as well as the BBC One series The Responder (2022) and the Netflix series Bodies (2023).

== Early life and education ==
Okafor was born in Birmingham to a Nigerian reggae artist father and an Indian journalist mother, and moved around the UK growing up. She studied theatre devising at Liverpool John Moores University. She began her career touring community theatre in schools, prisons, and churches, and was a member of the Unicorn Theatre ensemble in London for two years.

== Career ==
Originally credited by her full name of Sally Amaka Okafor, she made her West End theatre debut playing Sofia in Florian Zeller's The Son, which transferred from the North London Kiln Theatre to the West End Duke of York's Theatre in October 2019. In 2016 she appeared in Peter Pan at the National Theatre, and played Lady Macduff in Macbeth at the same theatre in 2018. She has appeared at the Royal Court Theatre in Hope Has A Happy Meal (2023), Grimly Handsome (2017), It's All Made Up, The Space Between, and I See You.

She has played Miranda in Unicorn Theatre's The Tempest, Guildenstern in Almeida Theatre's Hamlet, Amal in National Theatre of Scotland's Glasgow Girls, and an official in Hamlet at the Barbican Centre. Her other theatre credits include Nora: A Doll's House (2020), Bird, and After The End (2022).

Okafor's television work has included playing DI Deborah Barnes, a former colleague of the central character, Chris Carson, in the BBC's The Responder. She also appears in BBC drama The Split (2020). Okafor appears as DS Hasan in Netflix's Bodies. Bodies is created by Paul Tomalin, directed by Marco Kreuzpaintner, and based on the graphic novel by Si Spencer and Dean Ormston.

In one of her most prominent roles to date, Okafor stars alongside Aisling Bea, Alice Lowe, and Jayde Adams in Greatest Days, a 2023 cinematic adaptation of Take That's smash-hit stage musical, The Band. Greatest Days portrays a group of school friends reuniting after 25 years. The BFI's review says that Okafor and her co-stars "make the most of the film’s more predictable plotlines and gags". Her other film work includes upcoming UK indie comedy drama Sweet Sue, directed by Leo Leigh.

Okafor is also known for her work in radio drama and audiobooks, portraying Kaz in long-running BBC soap The Archers (a rare, brief, occurrence of a BAME character in this rural soap opera). and Zoe in Mark Ravenhill's adaptation of the Dion Boucicault play, The Octoroon, and appearing in Neil Gaiman's podcast series, The Sandman. She starred as Emily McCoy in Tom Stoppard's 2013 radio play, Darkside, based on Pink Floyd's classic album, The Dark Side of the Moon.

== Recognition ==
Okafor was named a 2023 Screen International Star of Tomorrow.

== Personal life ==
Okafor sings and writes music in her spare time, and has a daughter.
