= I Am Alive and You Are Dead =

I Am Alive and You Are Dead may refer to:

- I Am Alive and You Are Dead (album), a 2009 album by Orphans & Vandals
- I Am Alive and You Are Dead (book), a 1993 biography of Philip K. Dick by Emmanuel Carrère
