= Alan Amsby =

English-born Irish drag queen and cabaret performer

- Born: Alan Amsby; 1937 (age 88–89); Peckham, London, England
- Other name: Mr. Pussy
- Occupations: Drag queen, cabaret performer, wig maker
- Years active: 1960s–present
- Notable work: Before I Forget to Remember (2016)

Alan Amsby (born c. 1937), better known by the stage name Mr. Pussy, is an English-born drag queen and cabaret performer who has been a prominent figure in the Irish entertainment scene since 1969. He is widely regarded as a pioneer of Irish drag, achieving mainstream popularity during a period when homosexuality remained criminalised in Ireland.

== Early life and London career ==
Amsby was born in Peckham, South London, during the Blitz. After leaving school at 15, he worked for Wig Creations, a renowned theatrical firm in London. During his tenure, he styled wigs for Marlene Dietrich and notably helped craft the false moustaches worn by The Beatles for the Sgt. Pepper's Lonely Hearts Club Band album cover in 1967.

He began performing drag at the Royal Vauxhall Tavern in the late 1960s. He adopted the name "Mr. Pussy" after a landlady challenged him to perform, later stating he chose the name because he felt his makeup gave him a feline appearance.

== Career in Ireland ==
In 1969, Amsby was booked for a one-week engagement in Belfast, which was later extended to Dublin. He became a fixture of the Dublin cabaret circuit, holding a long-term residency at the Baggot Inn, which was demolished in 2001. Despite the conservative social climate of 1970s Ireland, Amsby became a household name and a frequent guest on RTÉ's The Late Late Show with Gay Byrne.

In May 1994, he opened Mr. Pussy's Café De Luxe on Suffolk Street, Dublin. The venue was a collaboration between Amsby and several high-profile partners, including Bono, Gavin Friday, and filmmaker Jim Sheridan. The club became a celebrity hotspot, hosting guests such as Naomi Campbell, Van Morrison, and Sean Connery.

== Relationships with contemporary performers ==
Amsby maintained close personal and professional ties with other leading figures of the British and Irish entertainment scenes, most notably Danny La Rue, Paul O'Grady (performing as Lily Savage), Rory O'Neill (performing as Panti Bliss), Thom McGinty (performing as The Diceman), and actor Rory Cowan.

=== Danny La Rue ===
Amsby was a contemporary and friend of Cork-born performer Danny La Rue. While La Rue was famous for his high-glamour "illusionist" style and mainstream success in the UK, Amsby often cited La Rue as a benchmark for the profession's craft. In his memoirs, Amsby recounted the mutual respect between the two, noting that while La Rue found success in the "palaces" of London, Amsby carved out a unique, more subversive niche in the "pubs and clubs" of Dublin.

=== Paul O'Grady ("Lily Savage") ===
Amsby shared a long-standing friendship with Paul O'Grady, whom he met during O'Grady's early years performing as Lily Savage in London's Royal Vauxhall Tavern. O'Grady frequently visited Amsby in Dublin, and the two were known for their shared "razor-sharp" wit and working-class roots.

Following O'Grady's death in 2023, Amsby spoke publicly about their bond, describing O'Grady as a "loyal friend" who never forgot his cabaret origins despite his later television stardom. Amsby noted that O'Grady often sought refuge in Dublin at Amsby's home and clubs to escape the intensity of British tabloid fame.

=== Rory O'Neill ("Panti Bliss") ===
Amsby played a significant role in the early career of Rory O'Neill, better known as the drag queen Panti Bliss. When O'Neill began performing in Dublin in the early 1990s, Amsby was already an established figure in the city's nightlife. O'Neill has frequently cited Amsby as a "mentor and a legend," noting that Amsby's residency at "Mr. Pussy’s Café De Luxe" established a template for the modern Irish drag circuit.

The relationship has been described as a "passing of the torch" from the cabaret-style drag of Amsby's generation to the more politically active drag represented by Panti. Amsby was the guest of honor at the opening of O'Neill's venue, PantiBar, in 2007. In later years, O'Neill has advocated for the recognition of Amsby's historical importance, often referring to him as "the mother of us all" in the context of LGBT history in Ireland. In 2015, O'Neill remarked: "There would be no Panti Bliss without Mr. Pussy. He showed us how to be fabulous and fierce when Ireland was a very different place."

=== Thom McGinty ("The Diceman") ===
Amsby's most enduring and visible friendship within the Dublin street landscape was with the Scottish-born actor and model Thom McGinty, known as "The Diceman." Despite their contrasting performance styles, the two were considered the "twin pillars" of Dublin's alternative culture from the 1970s through the 1990s.

The pair were frequent collaborators in public spectacle, often appearing together at Dublin Pride during an era when such visibility carried significant risk. Amsby often quipped that they were "the only two people in Dublin who could get away with wearing makeup in broad daylight." During McGinty's battle with HIV/AIDS, Amsby remained a devoted confidant and supporter until McGinty's death in 1995. Amsby has since been a primary voice in preserving McGinty's legacy, frequently contributing to documentaries and retrospectives regarding the "Golden Age" of Grafton Street performance.

=== Rory Cowan ===
Amsby has maintained a long-standing personal and professional relationship with actor and entertainer Rory Cowan. The pair first met in the late 1970s while Cowan was working for EMI Records (Ireland). During his tenure as Sales and Marketing Manager at EMI, Cowan took on the professional management of Amsby's drag act, Mr Pussy. Cowan frequently cites Amsby as a "trailblazer" for the LGBT community in Ireland, noting that Amsby's residency at the "Café De Luxe" provided a rare safe space during the 1990s.

The two remain close friends today. In 2022, Cowan joined Rory O'Neill at the National Wax Museum Plus for the unveiling of Amsby's waxwork, where he praised Amsby's cultural resilience, stating: "Alan didn't just perform for Dublin; he changed the DNA of the city's culture.

== Legacy ==
Amsby is frequently cited as the "Grand Dame" of Irish drag and a direct influence on subsequent performers, including Panti Bliss (Rory O'Neill), who wrote the foreword to Amsby's 2016 autobiography. In 2019, he was a guest of honour at the "50 Years of Pride" celebration at the National Concert Hall. In May 2022, Amsby was further honored when a wax figure of his stage persona, Mr. Pussy, was unveiled at the National Wax Museum Plus in Dublin. The figure was officially launched by long-time friend and broadcaster Anne Doyle, who cited Amsby's role in making Ireland a more open and inclusive society. Positioned in the museum's "Grand Hall of Fame," the addition was described by museum curators as a tribute to his status as a pioneer for the LGBTQ+ community and his decades-long career in Irish show business.

== Works ==
=== Film and Television ===
- 1993: In the Name of the Father (Cameo as prisoner alongside Paul O'Grady)
- 1970s–1990s: RTÉ Television and The Late Late Show (Frequent guest)

=== Books ===
- Mr. Pussy: Before I Forget to Remember, Alan Amsby and David Kenny, 2016, New Island Books. ISBN 978-1848405677
