= Diceman =

Diceman may refer to:

- The Dice Man, a 1971 book by George Cockcroft written under the pen name Luke Rhinehart
- Diceman (comics), a 1986 series of five game comics from the creators of 2000AD (and also a character in that series)
- The Diceman (TV series), an adventure travelogue on the Discovery Channel
- Andrew Dice Clay, American comedian and actor
- Richard D. James (Aphex Twin), British electronic musician
- Daisuke Matsuzaka (born 1980), Boston Red Sox pitcher
- Thom McGinty, Scottish-Irish street performer
