= Tom Mothersdale =

English actor

- Education: Rose Bruford College
- Occupation: Actor
- Television: Bodies

Tom Mothersdale is an English stage, television and film actor.

== Biography ==
From Storrington in West Sussex, he became interested in acting whilst at school and went on to study acting at Rose Bruford College.

=== Stage ===
He appeared as Tinker in Sarah Kane's Cleansed at the Royal National Theatre in 2016, and in Robert Alan Evans play in The Woods at London’s Royal Court Theatre alongside Lesley Sharp and Finn Bennett.

He played Elias in Annie Baker's award-winning play John at the National Theatre. He appeared in Headlong production of The Glass Menagerie and portrayed Mercutio in Headlong’s adaptation of Romeo and Juliet. In 2019, he played a mocking myth-teller in Caryl Churchill's Glass. Kill. Bluebeard. Imp.. at London’s Royal Court. In 2019, he played Richard III at the Bristol Old Vic, having previously played the role at Alexandra Palace. Like the character in the play, Mothersdale has scoliosis.

=== Film and television ===
On screen, Mothersdsle appeared in long-running television series Doc Martin, Endeavour and Peaky Blinders. His television credits also include Culprits (2023) and Bodies (2023). In 2024, he could be seen in the BBC One adaptation of Hilary Mantel historical novel Wolf Hall: The Mirror and the Light, portraying Richard Rich, 1st Baron Rich. That year, he was cast in the British horror film Black Noise alongside by Kate Phillips and Aidan Gillen. In 2025, he appeared with Steve Coogan and Harriet Walter in historical drama Brian and Maggie.

== Partial filmography ==
Year	Title	Role	Notes
2014	Peaky Blinders	Sabini Kidnap Gangster	2 episodes
2016	Endeavour	Peter Matthews	1 episode
2017	Doc Martin	Bill Potter	1 episode
2023	Bodies	Gabriel Defoe	8 episodes
2023	Culprits	Right Hand	7 episodes
2024	Wolf Hall: The Mirror and the Light	Richard Rich	6 episodes
2025	Brian and Maggie	David Cox	2 episodes
