= Brian and Maggie =

British television series

- Based on: Why Is This Lying Bastard Lying to Me? by Rob Burley
- Screenplay by: James Graham
- Directed by: Stephen Frears
- Starring: Steve Coogan; Harriet Walter
- Music by: Murray Gold
- Country of origin: United Kingdom
- Original language: English
- No. of series: 1
- No. of episodes: 2

Production
- Executive producers: Sarah Monteith; Delyth Scudamore; Rupert Majendie
- Producer: Dan Winch
- Production company: Baby Cow Productions

Original release
- Network: Channel 4
- Release: 29 January – 30 January 2025

Brian and Maggie is a 2025 Channel 4 dramatisation starring Steve Coogan as Brian Walden and Harriet Walter as Margaret Thatcher.

== Premise ==
The series depicts the final television interview of soon-to-be-outgoing Prime Minister Margaret Thatcher and journalist Brian Walden which took place in 1989, and from which their friendship never recovered.

== Cast ==
- Harriet Walter as Margaret Thatcher
- Steve Coogan as Brian Walden
- Paul Clayton as Bernard Ingham
- Ross Armstrong as John Wakefield
- Tom Mothersdale as David Cox
- Emma Sidi as Sue Richardson
- Karan Gill as Vinay Ahmed
- Simon Paisley Day as Ian Gow
- Paul Higgins as Geoffrey Howe
- Ivan Kaye as Nigel Lawson
- Nick Sampson as Alan Walters
- James Fleet as Ronnie Millar

== Production ==
The series is from Baby Cow Productions. It is directed by Stephen Frears and written by James Graham, with Steve Coogan as television interviewer Brian Walden and Harriet Walter as former British prime minister Margaret Thatcher. It has Sarah Monteith, Delyth Scudamore and Rupert Majendie as executive producers while Dan Winch is series producer. The cast also includes Emma Sidi, Ross Armstrong, Karan Gill and Ivan Kaye.

First look images from the production with Coogan and Walter in character were released by Channel 4 in October 2024. The trailer was released in January 2025 by Channel 4 on YouTube.

== Broadcast ==
The two-part series was broadcast on Channel 4 on 29 and 30 January 2025. The series premiered on 29 January 2025 at 21:00 in GMT time.

== Reception ==
Reviewing the programme for The Guardian, Lucy Mangan awarded Brian and Maggie three stars out of five, observing that while interesting, "in trying to do so much, it does – as you might expect – none of it quite well enough", adding that the original interview itself "does not have iconic cultural status." Rachel Cooke of The New Statesman described the show as "hugely provocative and a touch melancholy" and praised the cast's performances, while the Evening Standard's Martin Robinson hailed Coogan and Walter's "captivating" performances but said that the programme overall lacked tension, giving it three stars out of five. Nick Hilton of The Independent was more positive, awarding it four stars out of five and describing it as "effectively polemical", also highlighting the "loving attention to period detail."
