= Natalie Abrahami =

British theatre, film and opera director

- Education: Christ's College, Cambridge (English Literature)
- Occupations: Theatre, film, and opera director
- Organizations: Young Vic, Hull Truck Theatre, Gate Theatre
- Agent: Rose Cobbe, United Agents
- Notable work: Queen Anne (2015, 2017)
- Awards: James Menzies-Kitchin Trust Award
- Website: www.natalieabrahami.co.uk

Natalie Abrahami is a British theatre, film and opera director.

From 2007–12 she was joint Artistic Director of the Gate Theatre with Carrie Cracknell.Natalie was Associate Director and Genesis Fellow at the Young Vic in London 2013-16 and Associate Artist at Hull Truck Theatre and the Nuffield Theatre, Southampton.

== Career ==
Abrahami attended Ibstock Place School, Roehampton before sixth form at Latymer Upper School in west London. She read English Literature at Christ's College, Cambridge before joining the Royal Court Theatre as a Graduate Trainee and then continuing her training at the National Theatre Studio and the Young Vic. Abrahami was awarded the James Menzies-Kitchin Trust Award for Directors for her production of Samuel Beckett's Play and Not I. Abrahami and Cracknell were awarded a grant from the Paul Hamlyn Breakthrough Fund for Creative Entrepreneurs in 2009 to develop their vision of the Gate Elsewhere, involving co-production, touring and off-site presentations.

Abrahami was nominated for the 2010 Offie for Best Director for How To Be An Other Woman. In 2015 she directed the debut production of Helen Edmundson's play Queen Anne for the Royal Shakespeare Company at the Swan Theatre, later directing its revival at the Theatre Royal Haymarket in 2017.

== Credits ==
Selected directing credits include:

=== Theatre ===
- Abigail's Party by Mike Leigh, Royal Exchange Theatre, 2025, cast includes Tupele Dorgu, Graeme Hawley, and Kym Marsh.
- The Trials by Dawn King, Donmar Warehouse, 2022, cast includes William Gao, Honor Kneafsey, and Joe Locke.
- ANNA created by Ella Hickson, Ben and Max Ringham, Dorfman Theatre, National Theatre 2019, cast includes; Phoebe Fox, Max Bennett, and Diana Quick.
- The Meeting by Charlotte Jones, Minerva Theatre, Chichester, Chichester Festival Theatre, 2018, cast includes: Lydia Leonard, Gerald Kyd and Jean St Clair.
- Machinal by Sophie Treadwell, Almeida Theatre 2018, cast includes: Emily Berrington, Jonathan Livingstone and Kirsty Rider.
- Wings by Arthur Kopit, Young Vic 2017, cast includes Juliet Stevenson and Lorna Brown.
- Queen Anne by Helen Edmundson, Royal Shakespeare Company 2015 and Theatre Royal Haymarket 2017, cast includes: Emma Cunniffe, Romola Garai and Beth Park.
- Ah, Wilderness! by Eugene O'Neill, Young Vic 2015, cast includes: Janie Dee, George MacKay, and Martin Marquez.
- Happy Days by Samuel Beckett, Young Vic 2014 and revived 2015, cast: Juliet Stevenson and David Beames.
- After Miss Julie by Patrick Marber, Classics for a New Climate, Young Vic, 2012, cast: Natalie Dormer, Kieran Bew, and Polly Frame.
- The Kreutzer Sonata by Nancy Harris (adapted from Leo Tolstoy's novella), Gate Theatre (World Premiere 2009) and La MaMa E.T.C, New York 2012, cast: Hilton McRae, Tobias Beer, and Sophie Scott.
- Yerma in a new version by Anthony Weigh – after Federico García Lorca, Hull Truck Theatre and Gate Theatre, World Premiere 2011.
- Pericles by William Shakespeare, Regent's Park Open Air Theatre, 2011.
- A Midsummer Night's Dream by William Shakespeare, Headlong Theatre, Nuffield Theatre, Southampton and Hull Truck and Regional Tour, 2011.
- How To Be An Other Woman by Lorrie Moore (adapted by Abrahami), Gate Theatre, World Premiere 2010.
- Vanya by Sam Holcroft (inspired by Anton Chekhov's Uncle Vanya) Gate Theatre, World Premiere 2009.
- Guardians by Lucy Caldwell HighTide Festival, Halesworth, World Premiere 2009.
- Unbroken by Alexandra Wood (inspired by Arthur Schnitzler's La Ronde) Gate Theatre, World Premiere 2009.
- Women in Love by Mark Ravenhill, site specific production, Pembridge Square, London, 2008.
- The Internationalist by Anne Washburn, Gate Theatre, UK Premiere 2008.
- The Eleventh Capital by Alexandra Wood, Royal Court Theatre Upstairs, World Premiere, Winner of the 2007 George Devine Award 2007.
- Play and Not I by Samuel Beckett, Battersea Arts Centre, 2005.
- Human Rites by Amélie Nothomb, Southwark Playhouse, UK Premiere 2005.

=== Short films ===
- The Roof by Nigel Williams, A Young Vic Film, 2016, cast includes: David Lan, Peter Brook, Natalie Dormer, Noma Dumezweni, Jude Law, Sinead Matthews, Ian McKellen, and Hugh Skinner.
- MAYDAY by Nancy Harris, A Young Vic Film, 2014, cast: Juliet Stevenson, David Beames, and Tanya Moodie.
- Life's a Pitch by Olivia Poulet, A Young Vic Film, 2013, cast includes David Lan, Jane Horrocks, Rory Kinnear, and Eddie Redmayne.

=== Opera ===
- Rusalka (opera) by Antonín Dvořák created with Ann Yee, Royal Opera House, 2023, conductor Semyon Bychkov (conductor), cast includes David Butt Philip, Asmik Grigorian, and Hongni Wu.
- How The Whale Became by Ted Hughes, composer Julian Philips, libretto Ed Kemp, Linbury Studio Theatre, Royal Opera House, 2013.
