= Bodies (2023 TV series) =

British science fiction miniseries

- Genre: Drama; Mystery thriller; Science fiction
- Created by: Paul Tomalin
- Based on: Bodies by Si Spencer
- Starring: Jacob Fortune-Lloyd; Shira Haas; Amaka Okafor; Kyle Soller; Greta Scacchi; Tom Mothersdale; Michael Jibson; Stephen Graham
- Composer: Jon Opstad
- Country of origin: United Kingdom
- Original language: English
- No. of episodes: 8

Production
- Executive producers: Paul Tomalin; Marco Kreuzpaintner; Will Gould; Frith Tiplady
- Producer: Susie Liggat
- Production locations: Yorkshire and the Humber: Kingston upon Hull; Sheffield; York; Leeds, including Versa Studios
- Cinematography: Joel Devlin
- Editor: Johannes Hubrich
- Running time: 55-61 minutes
- Production company: Moonage Pictures

Original release
- Network: Netflix
- Release: 19 October 2023

Bodies is a British science fiction mystery thriller television miniseries primarily written and created for Netflix by Paul Tomalin and directed by Marco Kreuzpaintner and Haolu Wang. It is based on the 2014–15 DC Vertigo graphic novel of the same name, written by Si Spencer and illustrated by Dean Ormston, Tula Lotay, Meghan Hetrick and Phil Winslade. The series consists of eight episodes and premiered on Netflix on 19 October 2023.

The story starts with the appearance of a dead body in Longharvest Lane in the Whitechapel area of London. This same body appears in the same location in four different years – 1890, 1941, 2023 and 2053 – and leads to four investigations by Metropolitan Police detectives that eventually become interlinked, with far-reaching consequences.

== Cast ==
Character	1890	1941	2023	2053
DS Shahara Hasan	—	—	Amaka Okafor	Amaka Okafor
DS Karl 'Charles Whiteman' Weissman	—	Jacob Fortune-Lloyd	—	—
DI Alfred Hillinghead	Kyle Soller	—	—	—
DC Iris Maplewood	—	—	Shira Haas	Shira Haas
Lady Harker (Polly Hillinghead)	Synnøve Karlsen	Greta Scacchi	—	—
The body / Professor Gabriel Defoe	Tom Mothersdale	Tom Mothersdale	Tom Mothersdale	Tom Mothersdale
DCI Daniel (Harker) Barber	—	—	Michael Jibson	—
Elias Mannix / Sir Julian Harker	Stephen Graham	Stephen Graham	Gabriel Howell	Stephen Graham
DCI Calloway	—	Derek Riddell	—	—
Henry Ashe	George Parker	—	—	—
Charlotte Hillinghead	Amy Manson	—	—	—
Commissioner Hayden Harker	—	Michael Shaeffer	—	—
DI Farrell	—	Jonny Coyne	—	—
Maggie	—	—	Alexandra Roach	—
Andrew Morley	—	—	Mark Lewis Jones	—
Elaine Morley	—	—	Kate Ashfield	—
Agatha, Lady Harker	Anna Calder-Marshall	—	—	—
Sarah Mannix	—	—	Natalie Gavin	—
DI Bothroyd	—	—	Kae Alexander	—

== Episodes ==
No.	Title	Directed by	Written by	Original release date
1	"You're Dead Already"	Marco Kreuzpaintner	Paul Tomalin	19 October 2023
In 2023 London, Detective Sergeant Shahara Hasan spots a young Asian man, Syed Tahir, lurking near a far-right demonstration and holding a gun. She chases him and finds a naked, shot corpse in Longharvest Lane. She eventually traces Syed and tries persuading him to surrender but, distraught and protesting innocence, he kills himself. In 1941, a mysterious phone call instructs Detective Sergeant Charles Whiteman to retrieve and dispose of an identical body from Longharvest Lane. He is followed by Farrell, an antisemitic superior, but on the point of finding Whiteman with the body, Farrell is killed in an air-raid. Whiteman is put in charge of investigating the body and Farrell's death, while the caller upbraids him for failure and demands he sabotage the investigation. In 1890, Detective Inspector Alfred Hillinghead investigates the same body in Longharvest Lane. He obtains photographs of the crime scene from gay newspaper photographer Henry Ashe, who was suspiciously nearby. Seeing a man in one of the photos, the coroner brusquely warns Hillinghead against further investigation. In 2053, Detective Constable Iris Maplewood's vehicle detects an electromagnetic anomaly originating from Longharvest Lane. She investigates the now abandoned area, behind a radiation warning sign, and discovers the same man, naked and shot but still alive.
2	"Do You Know Who I Am?"	Marco Kreuzpaintner	Paul Tomalin	19 October 2023
Hasan's team investigates Elias Mannix, a troubled teenage friend of Syed's who was seen with him before the body was found. Hasan interrogates Mannix's adoptive parents, who lure police into a trap which kills her colleague. Mannix's adoptive mother cryptically thanks Hasan for what she will do for Elias, then regrets saying anything and bites her own tongue off. Whiteman frames a local criminal for the crimes, although his superior DCI Calloway remains suspicious. A child who saw Whiteman with the body at Longharvest Lane arrives at his station. Hillinghead is encouraged by his superior to close the case, but does not burn the photo of the man in the glass reflection. He and Ashe reluctantly agree to further investigate the case unofficially. United Britain is ruled by a dystopian junta called The Executive, led by Commander Elias Mannix, who seized power after a devastating bombing in 2023. Maplewood is blocked from investigating but illegally has her estranged brother identify the man she found via his DNA as the living Gabriel Defoe, a quantum gravity professor. Mannix requests that she look into Defoe's association with a terror group named Chapel Perilous.
3	"All in Good Time"	Marco Kreuzpaintner	Paul Tomalin	19 October 2023
Hillinghead and Ashe identify the man in the photo as stockbroker Sir Julian Harker, who strongly resembles Mannix. Harker invites Hillinghead to one of his mother's seances, where Hillinghead is drugged by the Harkers and photographed in a compromising position with Defoe's corpse. Hillinghead warns Ashe that Harker is plotting something and the two sleep together. Later Hillinghead returns to Longharvest Lane and carves his name and the three-pronged symbol in the base of a wall. The child, Esther, attempts to blackmail Whiteman. The organisation instructs him to kill her. Whiteman cannot bring himself to kill Esther, so he fakes her death and hides her in his flat. Elias Mannix is arrested and tells Hasan that his adoptive parents have knowledge of future events, including of an explosion they claim he will carry out. Back in Longharvest Lane, Hasan notices Hillinghead's name carved in the wall. Mannix informs Maplewood that the identical body found is Defoe's but from two days in the future, as his organisation Chapel Perilous has been able to create time travel which threatens the Executive's power. He instructs her to follow Defoe.
4	"Right Up the Wazoo"	Marco Kreuzpaintner	Danusia Samal	19 October 2023
Ashe notices a fingerprint Harker left on Hillinghead's spectacles, meaning they can still link him to the body via other prints Hillinghead had found on Longharvest Lane. Whiteman and Esther escape to an air raid shelter during a bombing, where Whiteman is assailed by and kills a fellow policeman who had been following him. The woman who has been calling Whiteman from the organisation is revealed to be Polly, Hillinghead's now elderly daughter, and poisons Esther. Hasan discovers archive case files from Hillinghead and Whiteman's investigations, as well as links between Mannix's adoptive parents, the Morleys, as well as the Harker family. Hasan breaks into Harker's abandoned home, where Andrew Morley speaks cryptically about being part of a large group on an inevitable path, whose roles are to change the world and future. Morley then locks Hasan in an underground room. Maplewood takes Defoe to her apartment to protect him from his forthcoming murder. They talk over wine about free will and his research into naked singularity. He attempts to escape but Maplewood catches him, only to be tasered by her neighbour Lorna, revealed to be Defoe's fellow member of Chapel Perilous.
5	"We Are One Another's Ghosts"	Haolu Wang	Paul Tomalin	19 October 2023
Hillinghead brings Harker in for questioning about Defoe's body, but Harker blackmails him with the compromising photographs, telling him to frame Ashe for the murder. Whiteman secures DCI Calloway's help in finding Polly, discovering she is Managing Director of Harker Bank. Whiteman abducts Polly, threatening her with Russian roulette until she confesses to killing Esther. Calloway arrests both of them for murder but is then killed by Polly's son Hayden, the Commissioner of Police. After learning that Elias' fingerprints match Julian Harker's, Hasan tracks down Elias' birthmother, Sarah Mannix. She learns that DCI Barber is Harker's great-grandson and Elias' father. Barber disappears after taking Elias from HM Prison Feltham. Hasan finds a 1941 recording addressed to her from Harker, confirming that she will help him bomb London. At the Chapel Perilous base, an older Hasan shows Maplewood "the Throat" – Defoe's time-travel device. They explain Mannix intends to travel back to the 1800s so he can start the cult to manipulate events that culminate in the 2023 bombing and his rise to power. Preferring the security of current society, Maplewood facilitates a raid that kills most of Chapel Perilous and leads Mannix to the Throat.
6	"The World Is Yours"	Haolu Wang	Danusia Samal & Paul Tomalin	19 October 2023
Hillinghead informs Ashe that he will be convicted for Defoe's death, but Ashe refuses to flee. Hillinghead signs a false confession, tells his family of his sexuality and is arrested. Polly maintains his innocence. An elderly Harker makes recordings addressed to others. Whiteman refuses Hayden's offer of joining the conspiracy and kills Polly and Julian in revenge for Esther's death. He is arrested, convicted and sentenced to death by hanging. Hasan informs SO15 of the bomb. DI Bothroyd accompanies her to Harker Bank where they find a vault containing a nuclear bomb. Hasan meets Barber and Elias, who holds the detonator. Bothroyd kills Barber. Later, Hasan takes Elias to his mother, but she shuns him. Pushed over the edge, Elias changes his mind and calls a number Barber gave him, which triggers the explosion. Defoe and Hasan are brought to Maplewood and Mannix. Hasan shoots Mannix in the leg but is wounded. Mannix forces Defoe to set the Throat to 1890, and he enters, arriving naked in 1890 with the mark from the bodies' wrists on his wrist. Defoe chases after him and Maplewood reluctantly shoots his eye as he enters the portal, thus causing the dead bodies in 1890, 1941, 2023, and 2053 to appear.
7	"Catch Me If You Can"	Haolu Wang	Paul Tomalin & Danusia Samal	19 October 2023
In 1889, Mannix adopts the identity of Sir Julian Harker, an aristocrat who supposedly died in Mandalay during the Third Anglo-Burmese War. Lady Harker agrees to go along with the deception as Mannix promises fortune, family and prestige. In 1890, Harker is photographed by Ashe. He purchases the bank and oversees construction of the bomb vault, grows his cult and romances Polly. When Hillinghead is arrested, Harker has him killed on his way to HM Prison Pentonville, after which he marries Polly and sires a son, Hayden. Polly is brought into the conspiracy, learning from her husband that he is from the future and they are family. Maplewood has secretly rescued Hasan, who is being treated at her brother's flat. From reading Defoe's notes, she predicts that Defoe will also have time travelled four days into the future; the trio rescue him. The group plans to have Maplewood travel to 1890 and sow doubt in Harker.
8	"Know You Are Loved"	Haolu Wang	Paul Tomalin	19 October 2023
Maplewood manages to tell Hillinghead about Harker's past and Hillinghead's impending death. Hillinghead tells Harker he knows the latter is Elias Mannix and that he will die alone and unloved. The confrontation changes the timeline, as the shaken Harker becomes cold and distant. He tells an anxious Polly that she is bound by the time loop and their relationship deteriorates. In 1941, a regretful Harker makes a secret last recording advising Elias against the plan. After Whiteman kills Polly, Harker persuades him to get the recording to Hasan. Whiteman hides the recording in a framed photograph before being killed by Hayden's officers. Hasan travels back to 2023 and finds the recording left by Whiteman. She informs her younger self of the second trigger. Older Hasan then plays Harker's new recording for Elias to hear and he does not detonate the bomb. Sarah embraces Elias, who disappears from existence along with older Hasan as the loop is undone. The detectives live new lives free from the loop's tragedy. In the alternative 2023, Hasan takes a black cab driven by Maplewood, who indicates she knows Hasan. The letters KYAL appear on the side of a skyscraper.

== Production ==
=== Development ===
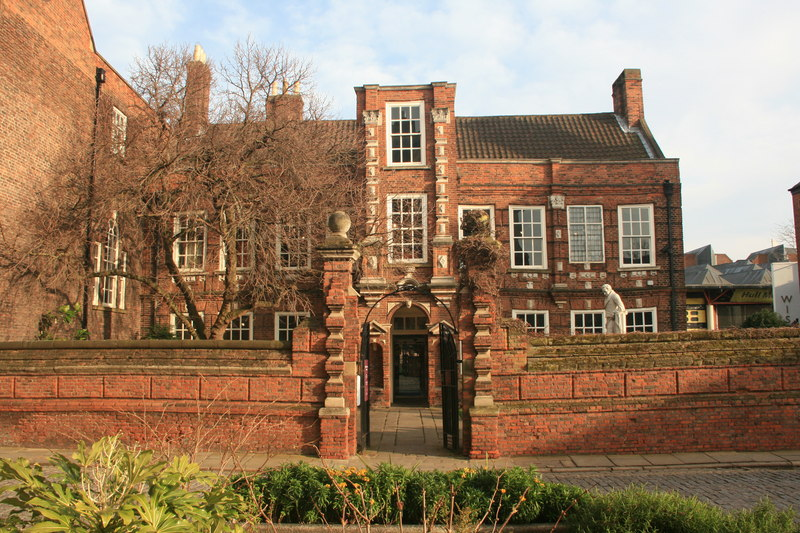
Wilberforce House in Kingston upon Hull stood in for the fictional Harker House in London.

The series was announced in February 2022 with Paul Tomalin set as creator and executive producer. Moonage Pictures was set to produce. Danusia Samal also serves as a writer. The score was provided by Jon Opstad

=== Casting ===
In July 2022, Shira Haas, Jacob Fortune-Lloyd, Amaka Okafor, Kyle Soller, and Stephen Graham were cast as the four lead protagonists (Metropolitan Police detectives) and the lead antagonist, respectively.

=== Filming ===
Filming began on 16 May 2022. Joel Devlin was the cinematographer.

Many scenes were filmed in the Museums Quarter of Kingston upon Hull, making use of the Victorian buildings in the city centre, including the fictional Harker House being filmed at Wilberforce House. Other scenes were filmed in York, on board Hornblower Cruises' boats and at the City Cruises Boatyard. Many of the futuristic scenes were filmed at the University of Leeds and at Sheffield's Little Kelham and Park Hill developments. Scenes in the fictional Longharvest Lane were filmed at Wentworth Woodhouse, near a minor side entrance in the northwest corner of the house, a section normally unseen by the public. Studio filming was carried out at Versa Studios, in Leeds. The series was completed on 21 October 2022.

== Reception ==
On the review aggregator website Rotten Tomatoes, 82% of 28 critics' reviews are positive, with an average rating of 6.8/10. The website's consensus reads: "Anchored by the indispensable Stephen Graham, Bodies' multiple twisting time strands coalesce into one satisfying binge." Metacritic, which uses a weighted average, assigned the film a score of 65 out of 100, based on 7 critics, indicating "generally favorable" reviews.

The Irish Independent notes a recurrence of motifs, words (such as 'Know you are loved') and names (such as 'Harker' and 'Mannix'), akin to the 2012 film Cloud Atlas. (Note: Note that Cloud Atlas suggests a form of reincarnation, while Bodies is about time travel)
