= Orphans & Vandals =

English indie rock band

- Origin: London, England
- Genre: Indie rock
- Years active: 2007–2010
- Past members: Al Joshua; Raven; Gabi Woo; Quinta; Francesca

Orphans & Vandals was an English indie rock band based in London. The band was formed by Al Joshua (guitar, harmonica, vocals, toy piano) after breaking up his moderately successful first band The Lost Revue in 2006, with Raven (bass guitar, backing vocals, harmonium), Gabi Woo (drums, percussion, backing vocals, harmonium, glockenspiel), Quinta (strings, percussion) and Francesca Simmons (strings, percussion) were the other three band members. Quinta and Francesca left the band shortly after the release of their debut album. The album, I Am Alive and You Are Dead, was released in the UK in April 2009. The band received critical acclaim from various media outlets including BBC Radio 6 Music, NME and PopMatters.

Their song "Mysterious Skin", which is over ten minutes long, includes a melodious and lyrical depiction of an orgasm and a reference to a homosexual sex act. Nonetheless, 6 Music allowed them to perform it on air as part of a live session for the Tom Robinson Show on 18 July 2008. Robinson stated that "the BBC has never banned Orphans And Vandals or their music".

In 2015, Al Joshua resurfaced with new solo material, some of which he wrote for the soundtrack of the upcoming film Set the Thames on Fire, which he also wrote.

Francesca Simmons releases material under the name Madame Česki.
