= Dan McCulloch =

British film producer and writer

- Born: United Kingdom
- Occupation: Writer, producer

Dan McCulloch is a British film and television producer and writer.

== Career ==
He co-wrote the episode They Keep Killing Suzie for the science fiction series Torchwood in 2006. The episode title, a reference to the Avengers episode "They Keep Killing Steed", was originally announced as only "They Keep Killing" in order to conceal Suzie's death before the first broadcast of "Everything Changes". He co-wrote it with Paul Tomalin. McCulloch later worked as a producer on films, such as The Stronger (2007) and Tony (2009), as well as on television series including the Inspector Morse prequel Endeavour and Indian Summers. He serves as an executive producer on the adaptation of Philip Pullman's epic trilogy His Dark Materials for BBC One.
