= Max Bennett (actor) =

English actor

- Born: 24 November 1984 (age 41); Leytonstone, London, England
- Education: The Latymer School; Queens' College, Cambridge; École Jacques Lecoq
- Occupation: Actor
- Years active: 2004–present

Max Bennett (born 24 November 1984) is an English actor. On television, he is best known for playing Monk Adderley in Poldark on the BBC, and Robert Southwell in Will for TNT. On film, he is best known for playing David in the Freddie Mercury biopic Bohemian Rhapsody, and Brown in Guy Ritchie's crime caper The Gentlemen. He has worked extensively in London theatre, with leading roles in the West End, as well as for the Donmar Warehouse, Royal Court, Young Vic, Shakespeare's Globe and the National Theatre.

== Early life ==
Bennett was born in Leytonstone, London, and attended The Latymer School in Edmonton, where he was Head Boy and played the title role in Hamlet in his final year. He trained with the National Youth Theatre, appearing in their production of The Master and Margarita at the Lyric Hammersmith. Bennett studied Modern and Medieval Languages (French and Italian) at Queens' College, Cambridge. Whilst there, he performed with the Footlights and the Marlowe Society and was named in Varsity's 'Talent 100' as "without doubt the most sought-after actor in Cambridge". He trained at the École Jacques Lecoq in Paris.

== Career ==
Bennett's first professional role was in film, while he was still living in Paris. He appeared opposite Jean Dujardin in the 2007 French comedy 99 Francs, following this up with another cameo the following year, in Saul Dibb's The Duchess, starring Keira Knightley.

After spending a year establishing a stage career, including a role in Samuel West's 2008 production of Waste at the Almeida that The Times named as one of its "Productions of the Decade", in 2009 Bennett won second prize in the Ian Charleson Awards for two performances: as Frank in George Bernard Shaw's Mrs. Warren's Profession and as Claudio in Measure For Measure.

Leading roles followed, notably as Ferdinand in 2011's Luise Miller in Michael Grandage’s critically acclaimed Donmar Warehouse production. Bennett played the tragic hero opposite Felicity Jones. The Arts Desk wrote, "Max Bennett is terrific as the hotheaded young Ferdinand, very fit in his hussar’s uniform". Soon afterwards, Bennett began filming on Joe Wright's film adaptation of Anna Karenina, released in 2012.

He then began his association with the Royal Court, appearing in Dominic Cooke's 2012 production of In Basildon by David Eldridge, before joining the cast of Posh, as it transferred to the West End later that year. After another Donmar Warehouse production, he returned to the Royal Court in 2013 for A Time To Reap, where he brought "a thrilling sense of danger" as Piotr.

After more film and television roles, Bennett appeared as Greg in 2013's hit West End revival of Alan Ayckbourn’s comedy Relatively Speaking at the Wyndham's Theatre, the Telegraph remarking he "memorably captures the confusion of the gawky young innocent abroad".

He followed this by playing Edmund opposite Frank Langella in the Chichester Festival Theatre production of King Lear, which transferred to the Harvey Theatre of New York's Brooklyn Academy of Music in 2014. The Hollywood Reporter wrote "excelling on the villainous side is Max Bennett as Edmund", Variety noting "he’s a fantastic actor. Vocally assured and quick on his feet, he claims the stage with total assurance. But it’s not all for show. There’s an intelligence to his delivery that makes every word of every line of every speech perfectly understandable."

He was back on the London stage later in 2014, playing the lead in 'Tis Pity She's a Whore at the Sam Wanamaker Playhouse at Shakespeare's Globe, the acclaimed production courting controversy as Transport for London banned its posters. Bennett's first leading role in film followed, playing Sal in "weirdly warming, visually affecting fable" Set the Thames on Fire.

More television was next for Bennett, with a 2015 stint on CTV’s medical drama, Saving Hope, before an episode of ITV’s Endeavour in 2016. He went back to working with classical text, but still on the small screen, appearing as John Talbot in the BBC/NBC mini-series The Hollow Crown, which starred Benedict Cumberbatch. Bennett then played Coottsey in Mike Bartlett's BBC film King Charles III in 2017, after their previous collaboration on 2015's Young Vic production of Bartlett's play Bull.

Bennett took on a series regular role in Craig Pearce and Shekhar Kapur's Will released on TNT in 2017. He played Jesuit poet, priest and martyr Robert Southwell, Shakespeare's cousin in the show and the most wanted man in England, "a messianic, charismatic leader bent on fomenting Catholic rebellion".

In 2017, it was announced that Bennett would be joining the cast of the fourth series of the BBC’s Poldark, as "unscrupulous society figure" Monk Adderley, a "psychopath with a death wish", according to The Guardian, "played brilliantly by Max Bennett". The Telegraph described him as "seized by the kind of malign competitive lust not seen on screen since Dangerous Liaisons".

The following year saw Bennett appear in the record-breaking and multi-award-winning Freddie Mercury biopic Bohemian Rhapsody, playing David, Mary Austin's new partner following her split from Freddie.

In 2019, a return to the stage followed for Bennett as he appeared in ANNA at the National Theatre, Ella Hickson's sound-led collaboration with Ben and Max Ringham, directed by Natalie Abrahami. Playing "sinister boss Christian", The Stage's five-star review found him "tall and threatening with bright blond hair and a voice that could cut glass".

Bennett was on the big screen again in 2020, playing privileged junkie Brown in Guy Ritchie's The Gentlemen.

== Filmography ==
=== Film ===
Year	Title	Role	Notes
2007	99 Francs	Salaud #1	
2008	The Duchess	Lord Walter	
2012	The Sweeney	Symes	
2012	Anna Karenina	Petritsky	
2013	The Numbers Station	Intern at Hospital	
2015	Set the Thames on Fire	Sal	
2015	Moth	Matthew	Short film
2016	The Rain Collector	Captain Fitzwilliam Wilmington	Short film
2016	The Family		Short film
2017	King Charles III	Coottsey	TV film
2018	This Damnation	Manny	Short film
2018	Bohemian Rhapsody	David	
2019	The Gentlemen	Brown	
2021	Censor	Mike Shepherd	

=== Television ===
Year	Title	Role	Notes
2013	Big Bad World	Sandy	Episode: "Series 1, Episode 5"
2015	Midsomer Murders	Kevin Paynton	Episode: "A Vintage Murder"
2015	Saving Hope	Dr. Patrick Curtis	Recurring role, 4 episodes
2016	Endeavour	Gideon Finn	Episode: "Arcadia"
2016	The Hollow Crown	John Talbot	Episode: "Henry VI Part I"
2017	Will	Robert Southwell	Series regular, 9 episodes
2018	Poldark	Monk Adderley	Recurring role, 4 episodes
2021	Leonardo	Cesare Borgia	Recurring role, 2 episodes

=== Theatre ===
Year	Title	Role	Director	Venue	Notes
2004	The Master and Margarita	Elgar-Delius	John Hoggarth	Lyric Theatre, London	with National Youth Theatre
2007	Cymbeline	Iachimo	Trevor Nunn	Cambridge Arts Theatre, Cambridge	with The Marlowe Society
2008	Finisterre	James	Max Webster	Theatre503, London	
2008	The Herbal Bed	Jack Lane	Caroline Leslie	Salisbury Playhouse, Salisbury	
2008	Romeo and Juliet	Benvolio/Friar John	Tamara Harvey	Theatre of Memory, London	
2008	Thyestes	Thyestes	Libby Penn	Battersea Arts Centre, London	
2008	Waste	Walter Kent	Samuel West	Almeida Theatre, London	
2009	Measure for Measure	Claudio	Jamie Glover	Theatre Royal, Plymouth	also, UK tour
2009	Mrs. Warren's Profession	Frank Gardner	Michael Rudman	Comedy Theatre, London	
2010	Danton's Death	Marie-Jean Hérault de Séchelles	Michael Grandage	Royal National Theatre, London	
2010	Fabrication	Son	Lucy Bailey	The Print Room, London	
2011	Luise Miller	Ferdinand	Michael Grandage	Donmar Warehouse, London	
2011	A Midsummer Night's Dream	Demetrius/Tom Snout	Natalie Abrahami	Various locations	with Headlong
2012	In Basildon	Tom	Dominic Cooke	Royal Court Theatre, London	
2012	Posh	Harry Villiers	Lyndsey Turner	Duke of York's Theatre, London	
2012	The Promise	Marat	Alex Sims	Donmar Warehouse, London	
2013	King Lear	Edmund	Angus Jackson	Chichester Festival Theatre, Chichester & Brooklyn Academy of Music, New York City	
2013	Relatively Speaking	Greg	Lindsay Posner	Wyndham's Theatre, London	also, UK tour
2013	A Time to Reap	Piotr	Caroline Steinbeis	Royal Court Theatre, London	
2014	'Tis Pity She's a Whore	Giovanni	Michael Longhurst	Sam Wanamaker Playhouse, London	
2015	Bull	Tony	Clare Lizzimore	Young Vic, London	
2019	Anna	Christian Neumann	Natalie Abrahami	Royal National Theatre, London	
2023	Macbeth	Macbeth	Abigail Graham	Shakespeare's Globe, London	
2025	A Knight's Tale The Musical	Chaucer	Rachael Kavanaugh	Manchester Opera House	

== Awards and nominations ==
Year	Award	Category	Production(s)	Result
2009	Ian Charleson Awards	Best classical stage performance by an actor aged under 30	Mrs. Warren's Profession and Measure for Measure	Second Prize
