= Chéries-Chéris =

LGBTQ film festival in France

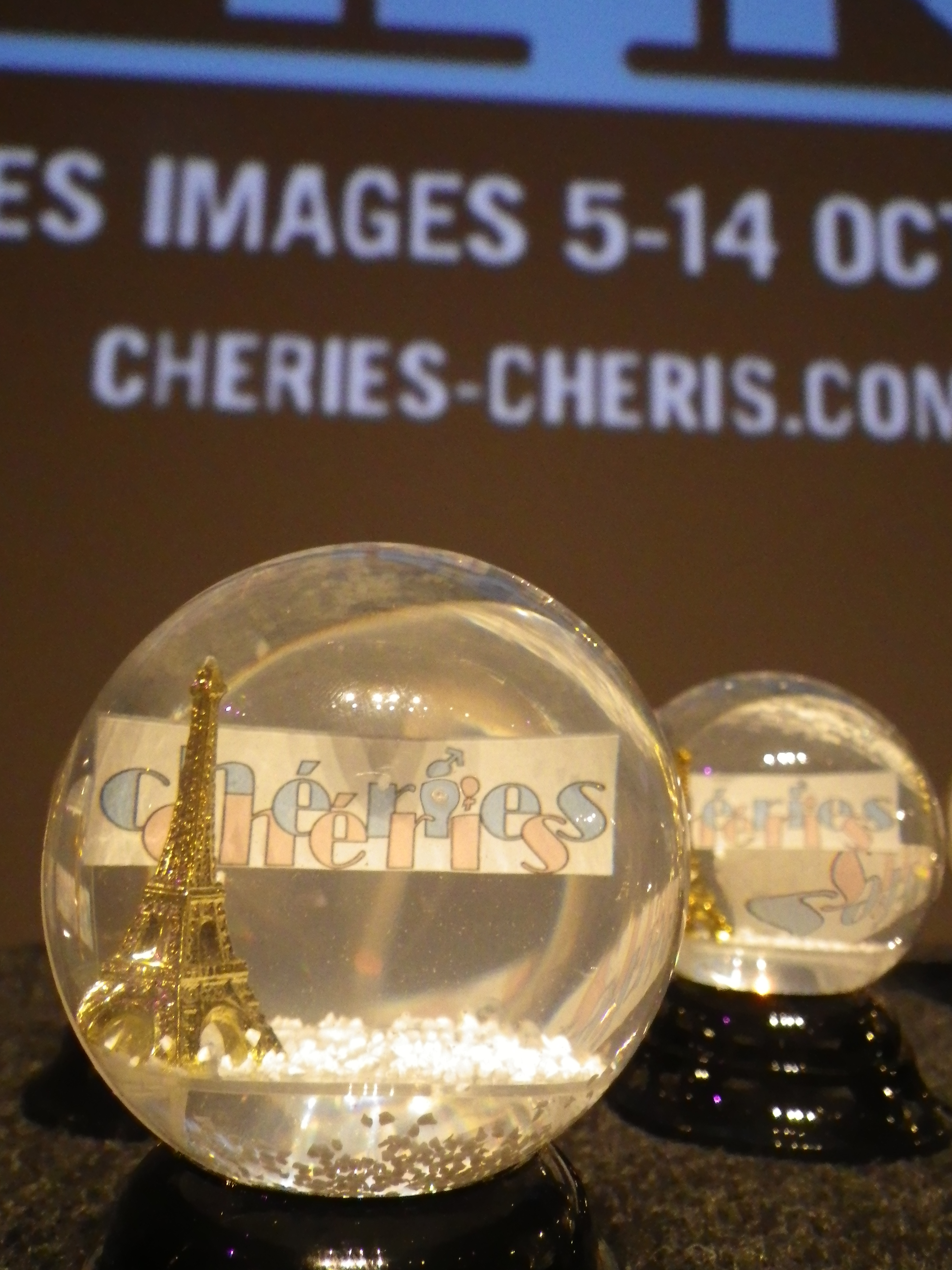
- Location: MK2 Beaubourg and MK2 Quai de Loire / Quai de Seine, Paris
- Founded: 1994
- Language: French
- Website: cheries-cheris.com

Chéries-Chéris (Festival du Film Lesbien, Gay, Bi, Trans & ++++ de Paris) is an annual international LGBT film festival held in Paris in October or November. Original titled "Festival of Gays and Lesbians of Paris", it was founded in 1994 by Yann Beauvais, Philip Brooks, Élisabeth Lebovici, and Nathalie Magnan. The festival is supported by the Ministry of Culture and the Direction régionale des affaires culturelles of Île-de-France.

From 2006 to 2009, the Canal + Short Film Award was announced. In 2010, the prize was extended to the Grand Prix, Prix d'Interpretation, Grand Prix Chéries du film documentaire, Pink TV for Documentary Prize, the Grand Prix of the Festival and the Pink TV for Short Film and a Special Mention award.

== Grand prix ==
Year	Film	Director(s)	Production country	Ref
2010	Uncle David	David Hoyle, Gary Reich, Mike Nicholls	United Kingdom	
2011	Romeos	Sabine Bernardi	Germany	
2012	Facing Mirrors	Negar Azarbayjani	Iran	
2013	Noor	Guillaume Giovanetti, Cagla Zencirci	France, Pakistan	
2014	The Smell of Us	Larry Clark	France	
2015	Where There Is Shade (De l'ombre il y a)	Nathan Nicholovitch	France	
2016	The Ornithologist (O Ornitólogo)	João Pedro Rodrigues	Portugal	
2017	Call Me by Your Name	Luca Guadagnino	Italy, France	
2018	The Harvesters (Die Stropers)	Etienne Kallos	South Africa	
2019	Lingua Franca	Isabel Sandoval	Philippines, United States	
2020	Dry Wind (Vento seco)	Daniel Nolasco	Brazil	
2021	Great Freedom (Große Freiheit)	Sebastian Meise	Austria, Germany	
2022	Joyland	Saim Sadiq	Pakistan	
2023	The Summer with Carmen	Zacharias Mavroeidis	Greece	
