= Nathalie Magnan =

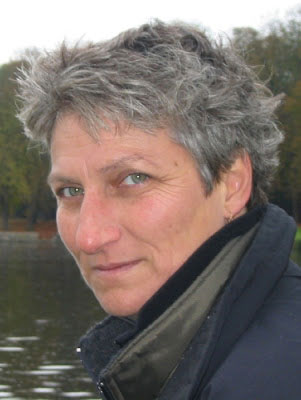
Nathalie Magnan in the 90s

Nathalie Magnan (29 November 1956 – 15 October 2016) was a media theoretician and activist, a cyber-feminist, and a film director. She taught at both universities and art schools, and is known for initiating projects linking Internet activism and sailing with the Sailing for Geeks project. She also co-organised the Los Angeles Gay and Lesbian Film Festival in 1984. She died at home of breast cancer.

== Education ==
After graduating with a Bachelor of Art degree at the Paris Nanterre University, she continued her studies in the United States and obtained a Master of Fine Arts at the Visual Studies Workshop in Rochester, New York, where she met Catherine Lord, Mario Biagioli, Skuta Helgason and Lisa Bloom. She obtained a Qualifying Exam at the University of California, Santa Cruz, where she met Teresa de Lauretis, who was working in the Women Studies department. In History of Consciousness, she met James Clifford and Donna Haraway, who took her as her assistant.

== Teaching ==
She started her teaching career as lecturer at the California State University, Northridge and Chapman University, where she taught an introductory class on photography during the 1984–85 school year. She was assistant professor at the University of California, Santa Cruz from 1986 to 1990, where she taught media studies, cultural studies and the history of photography.

Upon returning to France, she sought to share her American experiences in her teachings, films, publications and events that she organised and participated in.

In 1998 she became a full professor at the École nationale supérieure d'art in Dijon. In 2007, Paul Devautour invited her to come teach at the École nationale supérieure d'art in Bourges, where she taught until 2012. One of her classes entitled, Genre, which she gave in association with Giovanna Zapperi, was thought of as a space for pedagogical innovations within which she organised a lecture series with C. Lord, Paul Preciado, Shu Lea Chang, Yann Beauvais, Patrick Cardon.... In 2012, she invited A-LI-CE6 (Claire Fristot) to give a VJing workshop. She established links and exchanges with Luang Prabang (Entr'écoles, 2008 and 2010) and with the University of California, Irvine (CRUde1 in the US and CRUde2 in France). In Bourges, she created collaborations with Emmetrop and also with Bandits Mages. Her teachings focus on the analysis and critique of media on a feminist, queer and postcolonial point of view. More than transmitting knowledge, she wants to create a method, a trans-disciplinary process that leads to the conquest of autonomy.

== Media theory ==
A media theorist and activist, she published two books translated from English and German into French : La Vidéo : entre art et communication, followed by Connexions : arts, réseaux, médias, with Annick Bureaud. She managed the French distribution lists Nettime and CEDAR, the coordination of all French art schools.

Nathalie Magnan took part in a number of events of all kind, related to several parts of her expertise. In 2000, Isea, the international symposium on electronic arts, was organized in Paris. Not a single woman was invited. A hundred women met at Ensba on Nathalie Magnan's initiative and were welcomed by Mathilde Ferrer - together, they held an Isea counter-event. Every woman had 5 minutes to talk about her work. This is the first time that these women gained some public notoriety.

== Activism ==
=== Public access television ===
In the US, she took part in public access televisions and tactical media. She made several movies with the collectives Paper Tiger Television and Deep Dish TV, including The Gringo in Mañanaland.

=== Cyberfeminism ===
Magnan is one of the French pioneers of cyberfeminism. She created the website Cyberféminismes.org. In 1999, she was invited to the Canalweb show Les Pénélopes, to talk about cyberfeminism. In 2000, she organised the ISEA off event in Paris. The same year, she took part in the creation of a women's TV show for the local Aubervilliers television, called SixSex, as well as a show on the dangers of tampons on women.

In 2001, she was part of the Very Cyberfeminist International festival in Hamburg. In 2002, she translated and published the Cyborg Manifesto by Donna Haraway, which she then published in 2007. She organized a presentation of women artists active in the digital world, Openmic cyberfem, at the Maison des Métallos, and organized Gender Changer Academy workshops for ZELIG: a week of workshops, demos, meetings, and debates on the subject of communication, networks, open source software and Internet activism. She created the Chiennes de Garde website and managed this feminist online forum until 21 June 2003.

In 2008, she organized the Femmes et Réseaux (Women and Networks) meeting in Paris with Isabelle Arvers and Anne Roquigny. She talked about Feminism and Cyberfem at the Master of Advanced Studies of the Zurich University of the Arts in 2009, and in March 2010 in Paris.

On 7–8 March 2015 she was part of the Wikipedia Art+Feminism Editathon in Paris. On 6 June she talked about tactical media during Performing Opposition in Aubervilliers.

=== Sailing for Geeks ===
Nathalie Magnan invented the concept of Sailing for geeks, combining cybertechnologies and the rigorous logic of sailing. Sailing for geeks 1 is held in Finland, at Isea 2004, and Sailing for geeks 2, in 2005, lead people to explore sailing conditions in the Gibraltar detroit, to meet people trying to escape the Moroccan coast and come to Europe.

Her last public interventions are held in 2015. On 21 November 2015 she talked about Blackmarket for Useful knowledge and Non Knowledge at the Musée de l'Homme.

=== Gay and lesbian activism ===
Nathalie Magnan was a co-organiser of the Los Angeles Gay and Lesbian Film Festival in 1984. In the 1990s, she took part in the New Queer Cinema festival at the Paris American Center. In 1994, she co-founded the Paris Gay and Lesbian Film Festival, and she was its president in 2001 and 2002. In December 1995, she joined Lesborama to come to the Lille festival Questions de genre – 100 ans de cinéma gai et lesbien – 10 ans de prévention, which is the first Gay Night at Canal+.

In 1992, she wrote for the periodical Gai Pied.

== Productions ==
=== Publications ===
- La vidéo : entre art et communication, Paris, Ensba, 1997
- Connexion, art, réseaux, médias, Paris, Ensba, 2002, 642 p. (ISBN 2-84056-079-8), with Annick Bureaud
- Donna Haraway, Manifeste cyborg et autres essais : Sciences - Fictions - Féminismes; anthologie établie par Laurence Allard, Delphine Gardey et Nathalie Magnan, Paris, Exils, 2007, 333 p.
- Donna Haraway (trad. Marie Héléne Dumas, Charlotte Gould, Nathalie Magnan), « MANIFESTE CYBORG: SCIENCE, TECHNOLOGIE ET FÉMINISME SOCIALISTE À LA FIN DU XXe SIÈCLE », www.cyberfeminisme.org, 2002

=== Articles in collaborative books and scientific periodicals ===
- Art, Hack, Hacktivisme, culture jamming, médias tactiques in ART++, David-Olivier Lartigaud, ed. HYX and Laboratoire des arts et des médias, Paris, France, 2011
- 15 ans de création artistique sur internet, WJ-Spots #1 in Musiques et cultures digitales, hors série #3, Anne Roquigny ed., September 2009
- Pour une pratique politique du code dans Arts numériques, Tendances, Artistes, Lieux et Festivals, Anne-Cécile Worms ed., M21 édition, September 2008
- Al Jazeera English : An Interview with Hassan Ibrahim, inTactics in Hard Times : Space and Practice of New Media, MIT Press, 2008
- Second Life, un genre de gouvernance, inSecond Life, un autre monde possible, Agnès de Cayeux and Cécile Guibert eds., Les Petits matins, 2007
- Présentation du Manifeste Cyborg in Mouvements No. 45/4, May–August 2006
- Au commencement était le réseau, in Power, Villette numérique, 2004
- Cinéma pornographique lesbien, in Dictionnaire des cultures gays et lesbiennes, Didier Eribon ed., Larousse, 2003
- Cultural Jamming / Media Tactics in Through the 'net studies in Johen Gerz' Anthologie of Art, Salon Verlag, 2003
- La Télévision comme moyen artistique et outil démocratique de participation, with Jean-Christophe Royoux, Radiotemporaire, École du Magasin, 2002
- Rethinking Female Experience(s), coll, in n.paradoxa, international feminist art journal, KT publication, vol 10, London, July 2002
- Not working Chiennes de garde, in Very Cyberfeminist International, a reader on OBN (Old boys network) Conference, Helene Von Oldenburg, Claudia Reiche eds., b_books, Berlin, 2002
- Groupes tendances mouvements de l'art contemporain, Mathilde Ferrer, Marie-Hélène Colas-Adler, Jeanne Lambert Cabrejo eds, ENSb-a, 2001
- Cartographie subjective et momentanée des cyberféministes, in Femmes & Art au XXe siècle : le temps des défis, Lunes, special issue No. 2, 2000
- Cartographie subjective et momentanée des cyberféministes, in Synesthésie No. 9
- A personal map of the resistance movement in France, in Next 5 Minutes 3 : The Art of Campaigning, Amsterdam, 1999,
- Tactiques media et Cyber guerilla, in Blocnotes, April–May 1996,
- Access for Others : Alter (Native) Media Practice, with DeeDee Halleck, in Visual anthropology Review, University of California, Berkeley, Spring 1993,
- The Same difference : On Lesbian Representation, with Martha Gever, in Stolen Glances : Lesbians takephotographs, Tessa Boffin and Jean Fraser eds, Pandora, Londons, 1991
- Don't just watch it, Make it, or Stratégies de représentation telles que les pratiquent les collectifs vidéo US dans les années 1990, in Dénonciation, catalogue for a collection by Béatrice Simonot and Liliana Albertazzi, eds. La Différence / GNAC-Usine Fromage, Rouen, 1991
- Vidéo résistance à l'heure des satellites, in Le Monde diplomatique, mai 1991, republished in Cartes sur Câble, Belgium, and in Média Mensonges et Démocratie, May 1991, and in the minutes of the CRAC Valence symposium Guerres et Télévision, Collection 25 Images secondes, 1991
- Deconstructing Difference, with Martha Gever, Screen, Londres, Winter 1987
- Sciences humaines et faits de société, catalogue for the Cnc, Images de la culture, co-writer.

=== Filmography ===
- Il n'y a pas de fumée sans feu, et en plus c'est vrai, Canal+, 24', 1996
- Un homme sur deux est une femme, La Huit, 5', 1996
- Internautes, Canal+, 13', 1995
- Lesborama, Canal+, 30', 1995
- Dee Dee Halleck, El Gringo in Mañanaland, 1994, with Dee Dee Halleck
- High Tech Baby, Deep Dish TV, 30', Spring season 1994, with Kathy High. She is the director for French scenes.
- L'Eprouvante éprouvette, G. Production, 34', 1991
- Avez-vous vu la guerre ?, 45', 1991, with Canal déchaîné
- Martha Rosler reads the case of Baby SM, or, Born to be sold, 27', 1988, with Paper Tiger TV, New York
- Donna Haraway reads the National Geographic of Primates, 27', 1987, with Paper Tiger TV, New York
