= Set the Thames on Fire =

- Directed by: Ben Charles Edwards
- Written by: Al Joshua
- Based on: Characters by Al Joshua
- Produced by: Anna Smith-Tenser; Sadie Frost; Emma Comley; Andrew Green
- Starring: Michael Winder; Max Bennett; Noel Fielding; Sally Phillips; Sadie Frost; Lily Loveless; David Hoyle
- Cinematography: Sergio Delgado
- Edited by: Darren Baldwin
- Music by: Al Joshua
- Production company: Blonde to Black Pictures
- Release dates: 30 September 2015 (Test Screening/Raindance Film Fest); 8 January 2016 (Palm Springs International Film Festival); 21 April 2016 (BFI Southbank)
- Running time: 83 minutes
- Country: United Kingdom
- Language: English

Set the Thames on Fire is a 2015 British science fiction fantasy comedy-drama film directed by Ben Charles Edwards in his directorial debut, based on characters created by Al Joshua. The film stars Michael Winder and Max Bennett, alongside an ensemble cast featuring Noel Fielding, Sadie Frost, Sally Phillips, David Hoyle, and Lily Loveless. Its title is a reference to a line in the song "Anywhere I Lay My Head" by Tom Waits.

== Plot ==
Art is a down-on-his-luck lowlife pianist, whose life has stalled in a grief filled frozen moment – shipwrecked on the lonesome shore of his own life. Sal is a cracked pinball machine; full of energy, light and fun but out of control and dangerously chaotic. Having escaped from Bedlam Psychiatric Hospital, Sal is an easy-going, sweet natured imp of the perverse and agent of trouble.

The two boys meet whilst working as the help at a vile cocktail party for the rich and corrupt. The boys make a connection, finding refuge in each other – the only shipmates on a drunken boat, tossed about on a stormy London sea. At the cocktail party, the elegant and sophisticated Colette reads the dangerously paranoid Impresario's tarot cards, predicting the demise of the old, bloated and corrupt. This sets in motion a series of strange events that may connect together like a great unseen plan, or may simply be the random coincidences of an uncaring universe.

The boys become caught up in the cogs as they turn, like two rats caught in the machinery of Big Ben, as the cogs drags them ever nearer a terrifying climax. A confrontation between two different natures – the Impresario's relentless "progress" of greed and brutality, and the boys’ urge for freedom, friendship and beauty. And ever present in the background is the dark and powerful Thames – representing the forces of nature, chance and instinct – but who will it back in this battle of heart and imagination versus bestial brutality?

== Cast ==
- Michael Winder as Art
- Max Bennett as Sal
- Noel Fielding as Dickie
- Sally Phillips as Colette
- Sadie Frost as Mrs Hortense
- Lily Loveless as Emily
- Gerard McDermott as The Impresario
- David Hoyle as The Magician

== Production ==
The film entered production in May 2014 in London, England.

== Release ==
The film was selected to premiere in competition at the Palm Springs International Film Festival on 8 January 2016. Receiving its UK premiere to a sold-out audience at the BFI Southbank, London on 21 April 2016.

Set the Thames on Fire received its UK cinema release at selected PictureHouse and EveryMan cinemas September 2016.

== Critical reception ==
Following the film's British theatrical release, film magazine Little White Lies awarded 4 stars, expressing that "This surprisingly touching tragicomedy revolves around love and friendship, and it’s a gem of low-budget British cinema that ignores discussing the political issues that come with societal collapse, instead focussing on something more emotive and soulful." continuing with "this is not just surrealism for the sake of it. It’s bonkers, but with a point. Far from being pure dystopian tragedy, Set the Thames on Fire is a weirdly warming, visually affecting fable about needing a mate when the whole world has gone to crap".

Following the film's first American screening at the Palm Springs Film Festival, The Hollywood Reporter described the film as "brimming with visual invention" and "director Ben Charles Edwards' background as a painter is evident in the lurid whimsy of his dark-comic 'Agony in Three Acts', and fans of Terry Gilliam will appreciate the sick and twisted fantasy details of the feature". With other critics writing "Set the Thames on Fire follows the fine tradition of quirky out-there movies like Brazil, A Clockwork Orange, Delicatessen, and The Cook, the Thief, His Wife & Her Lover" and "An absolute must see experience, and certainly the most interesting film I saw at the festival".

The film has also been listed as one of the "Top London Films To See In 2016" by the Londonist.

Following the UK festival premiere at the BFI Southbank, critical response was positive, with film review site Dirty Movie making it a four star "dirty gem", stating in their opinion: "it resonates with the absurdist play 'Waiting for Godot' by Samuel Beckett". Hey U Guys said that the film is "visually enticing with solid special effects and an enchanting score", with Smokescreenlondon adding that the "kaleidoscopic vision of the capital is a striking feast for the eyes". The Velvet Onion concluded that the film is "Beautifully-imagined and uncomfortably visceral" and "an astonishing achievement for a debut".

Time Out then-editor Dominic Wells transcribed the proceedings on his culture blog "London, Hollywood": "The BFI Southbank (was) an unexpectedly conventional setting in which to see one of the most original, daring and visually ravishing British debuts in years". Wells surmised his round up of the event by saying: "when so many low-budget British films re-tread the same old gangster, horror or kitchen-sink clichés, it's incredibly refreshing to see one that aims for the stars. This is one of the most startlingly original and ravishing films to come out of Britain since Ben Wheatley".

== Awards and nominations ==
To date, Set The Thames on Fire has been nominated for The Discovery Award for Best New Debut Film at the BFI London Comedy Film Festival 2016. The film was also long-listed for the British Independent Film Awards 2016 for "Outstanding Achievement In Craft".
