= I Am Alive and You Are Dead (album) =

Studio album by Orphans & Vandals
- Released: April 27, 2009
- Genre: Indie rock

I Am Alive and You Are Dead is the debut album by Orphans & Vandals, released on 27 April 2009 in the UK. The name is a quotation from Philip K. Dick's novel Ubik.

== Track listing ==
1. "Strays"
2. "Mysterious Skin"
3. "Argyle Square"
4. "Liquor on Sunday"
5. "Incognito"
6. "Metropes"
7. "Christopher"
8. "Terra Firma"
9. "Head on with Tears"
