= Royal Vauxhall Tavern =

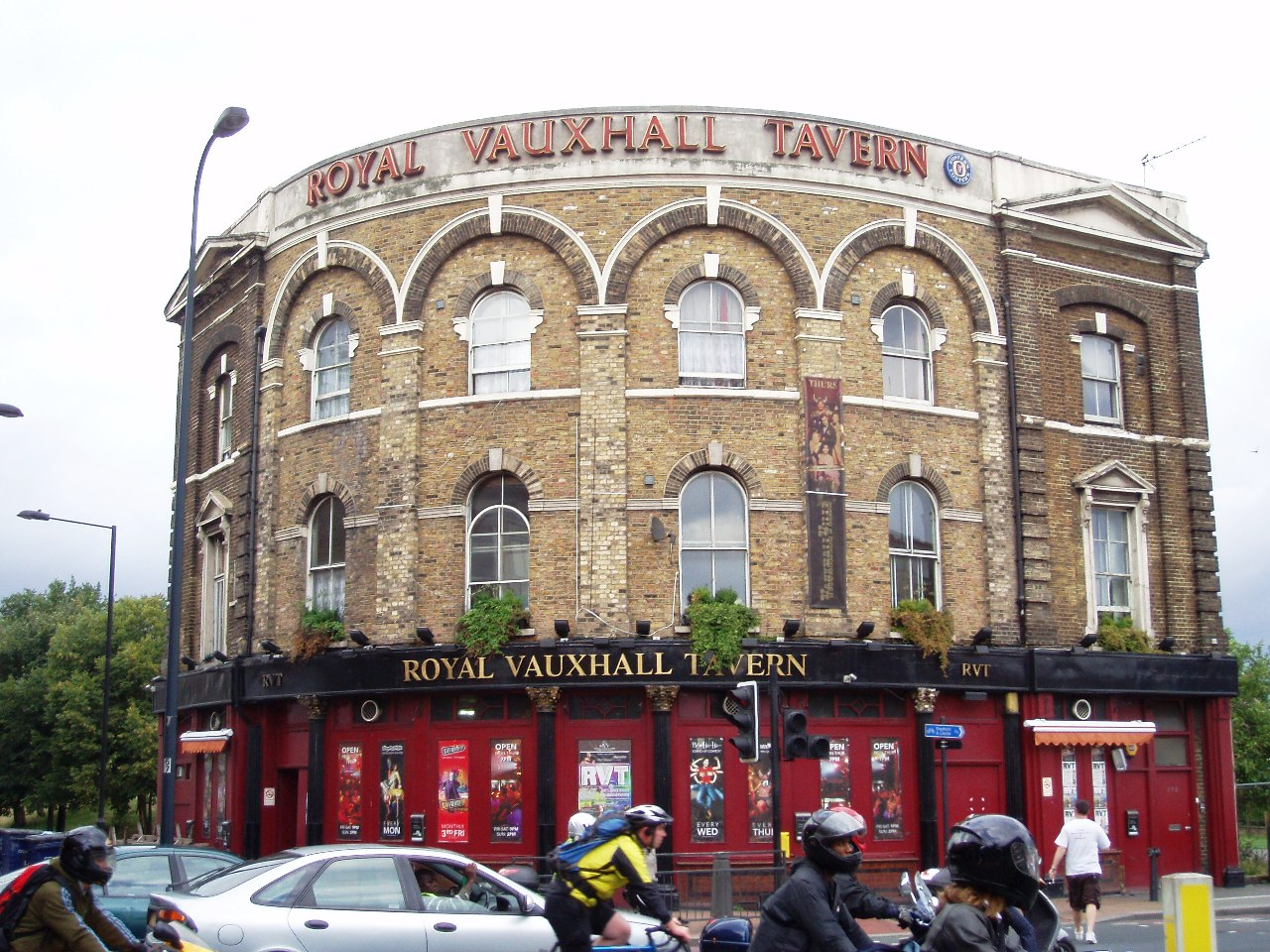
- The Royal Vauxhall Tavern in 2008

- Location within London Borough of Lambeth

General information
- Location: Vauxhall; London, SE11; United Kingdom
- Coordinates: 51°29′11″N 0°07′19″W
- Opened: 1863; 163 years ago

Website
- http://www.vauxhalltavern.com/
- Listed Building – Grade II

The Royal Vauxhall Tavern is a Grade II listed Gay entertainment venue in Vauxhall, London. It is also known as the RVT. It is South London's oldest surviving queer venue.

== History ==
The RVT was built between 1860 and 1862 at Spring Gardens, Kennington Lane, on land which was originally part of the Vauxhall Pleasure Gardens. Although sometimes reported to have started life as a music hall, the venue was in fact constructed as a public house and has always served that function. After the Second World War, returning servicemen and local gay men were reportedly attracted to the venue, which held shows by female impersonators (drag shows).

By 1975, the Royal Vauxhall Tavern had two bars around a kidney-shaped bar which doubled as a stage for the drag artists to dance along in their stilettos from the tiny apron stage at one end. Prior to the cabaret starting the bar would be cleared of glasses and drinks and the staff would clean the bar ready for the drag to dance along with it in their heels. The public bar attracted local workers and had a dartboard whilst the lounge attracted the local gay community. Notable acts from this era include "Carla" with her Barbra Streisand impersonation, "Jackie Sh*t" with her political tombola and "The Great Lee Paris" on a Saturday night with Land of Hope and Glory.

The RVT survived local redevelopment throughout the 1970s and 1980s and maintained its independence as a gay venue. Many of London's top drag artists performed there, including Hinge and Bracket and Regina Fong. Diana Dors also appeared there. Lily Savage, the drag persona of Paul O'Grady, was a regular performer for eight years, with shows four times per week. The RVT was also the venue where O'Grady's long-time friend and contemporary, Alan Amsby (known as Mr. Pussy), began his drag career in 1968. Amsby moved to Ireland the following year, becoming the country's pioneering drag and cabaret performer in a career now spanning fifty-seven years.

In 1987, the premises were raided by officers wearing rubber medical gloves to investigate allegations of drunken behaviour, despite no such complaints being made by Vauxhall residents. Junior minister Douglas Hogg said the surgical gloves were worn to prevent "infection by hepatitis B or AIDS as a result of accidental injury from any drugs paraphernalia", including poppers (amyl nitrite). In 1980s Britain, HIV/AIDS was considered by some to be a "gay plague"; this raid has been seen by LGBT historians as an example of increased discrimination and harassment of gay men during this era. 11 people were arrested, including Savage, who was performing that day. During the raid, she quipped that the gloved officers had arrived to "help with the washing up".

According to Cleo Rocos in her memoir The Power of Positive Drinking, Diana, Princess of Wales, visited the RVT in the late 1980s, disguised as a man and accompanied by Rocos, Freddie Mercury and Kenny Everett. Rocos stated that revellers did not notice Diana because their attention was focused on Mercury, Everett and Rocos. Mercury’s close friend and personal assistant, Peter Freestone, has stated that Mercury was not involved in this outing and never met the Princess.

In 2005, the Royal Vauxhall Tavern was taken over by gay businessmen Paul Oxley and James Lindsay. With a new lighting and sound system, the venue opened seven nights a week and maintained its popularity. In November 2014 the RVT was sold to property developers in a multimillion-pound commercial deal. Lindsay was retained and appointed by the new business owners. The community campaign group RVT Future was formed soon afterwards to defend the venue's continued use as a site of LGBTQ community and culture.

Following an application by RVT Future, the RVT was made a Grade II–listed building on 8 September 2015, becoming the UK's first building to be listed in recognition of its importance to LGBTQ community history. The campaign was supported by the then Mayor of London, Boris Johnson, and the actors and entertainers Ian McKellen and Paul O'Grady, among many others.

The RVT was featured as a location in the 1970 film Goodbye Gemini, 2007's Clapham Junction, 2014's Pride, 2016's Absolutely Fabulous: The Movie and 2023's All of Us Strangers.

== Events ==
=== Bar Wotever ===
Bar Wotever was a weekly cabaret and performance night every Tuesday but that has now ceased to run.

=== Sunday Social ===
Sunday Social is a Sunday afternoon event which combines drag performers and DJs.

=== Duckie ===
Duckie is an avant garde club night which used to be hosted by Amy Lamé every Saturday night at the RVT, starting in the mid 1990s. According to the venue, Duckie provided "queer heritage, performance art and honky-tonk". The event's disc jockeys, known as "The Readers Wifes" [sic], play Britpop, disco, hi-NRG, easy listening, glam rock, rock, contemporary pop, new romantics and punk. Duckie had its last night at the RVT in 2022. It still runs a regular event hosted by Azara Meghie at the Eagle in Vauxhall.

=== Beefmince ===
Beefmince is a twice-monthly Friday (now Saturday) night club night.

=== Anthem ===
Anthem is an in-house bi-monthly Friday night club night featuring trance and euro tracks and mixes but following the “retirement” of its promoter no longer runs.

=== David Hoyle ===
The performance artist David Hoyle intermittently hosts an avant-garde cabaret show.

=== Push The Button ===
Push The Button is a club night hosted on the last Friday of every month, playing pop music from 1990 to present day.

== Awards ==
The Royal Vauxhall Tavern won the Fringe Report best venue in 2010, and London Best Cabaret Venue 2012.

== See also ==
- List of LGBTQ bars
