= Paul Tomalin =

British television screenwriter

- Born: United Kingdom
- Occupation: Screenwriter

Paul Tomalin is a British television screenwriter.

== Career ==
Tomalin served as story editor on Shameless in 2009 on the sixth series, as well as wrote an episode. He wrote the Torchwood episode "They Keep Killing Suzie" (2006), with Dan McCulloch. With Paul Abbott, he contributed to police procedural drama No Offence, and then wrote for the second series of the period crime drama series The Frankenstein Chronicles designed as a re-imagining of Mary Shelley's 1818 novel Frankenstein.

In 19 October 2023, Bodies was released by Netflix. The miniseries was created and primarily written by Tomalin, and is based on DC Vertigo graphic novel of the same name by Si Spencer.

In August 2026, it was announced that he would adapt Stephen King's short story Crouch End for miniseries, which was ordered by Amazon Prime Video.
