= David Hoyle (performance artist) =

British entertainer

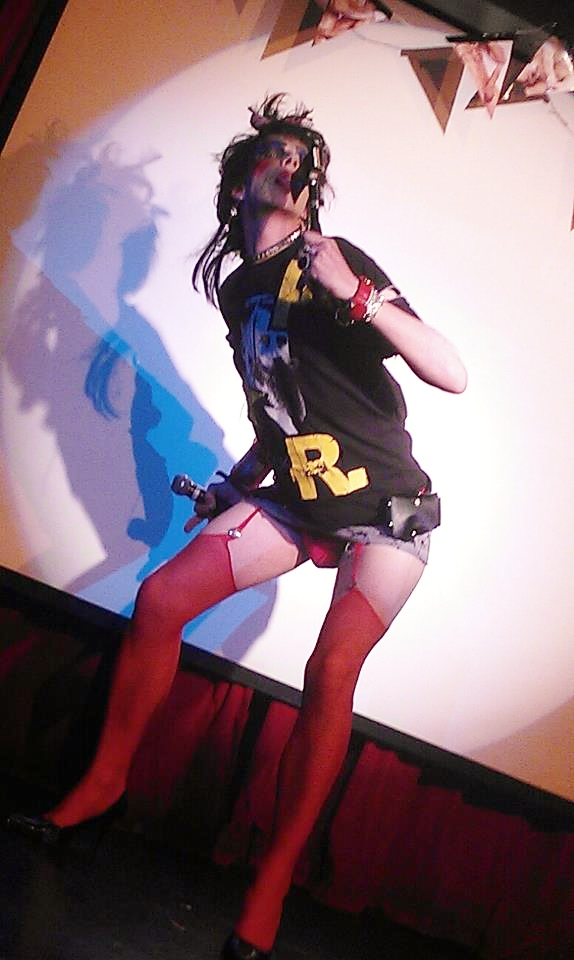
- Hoyle licking an axe at his Pandrogyna show, held at the Royal Vauxhall Tavern in 2012.
- Born: David Hoyle; 19 September 1962 (age 64); Blackpool, Lancashire, England
- Occupations: Performance artist, actor, comedian
- Years active: Early 1990s–present

David Hoyle (born 19 September 1962) is an English performance artist, avant-garde cabaret artist, singer, actor, comedian and film director. His performances combine disparate elements, from satirical comedy to painting, surrealism and striptease, much of which is aggressive comedy in nature. Hoyle's work has often focused on themes in the LGBTQ community, attacking what he sees as dominant trends in "bourgeois Britain and the materialistic-hedonistic gay scene". According to The Guardian his performances have led him to become "something of a legend" on the London cabaret circuit.

Born into a lower-middle-class background in Layton, Blackpool, Lancashire, Hoyle was bullied for his homosexuality as a child, leading to a mental breakdown aged fourteen. He began performing at a local working men's club before moving to London and then Manchester. There he began performing at gay clubs in the early 1990s, eventually developing the character known as The Divine David, an "anti-drag queen" who combined "lacerating social commentary" with "breathtaking instances of self-recrimination and even self-harm." Taking his character to television, he appeared on the BBC's Comedy Nation (1998) and produced two shows for Channel 4, The Divine David Presents (1998) and then The Divine David Heals (2000). That year, he brought an end to The Divine David character, performing a farewell show at Streatham Ice Arena entitled The Divine David on Ice.

Retreating from his public appearances, Hoyle returned to his home in Manchester where he suffered from a mental breakdown that lasted several years. In 2005 he returned to television, appearing as the character Doug Rocket on Channel 4 sitcom Nathan Barley, and the next year he returned to the stage, performing as himself in a show entitled David Hoyle's SOS. Over the next few years he continued with a string of shows, most of which were held at the Royal Vauxhall Tavern in London, and which included Magazine (2007), Dave's Drop-In (2009), Licking Wounds (2010) and Lives (2011). In 2010 he also released his own feature film, Uncle David, in which he both directed and starred.

== Early life ==
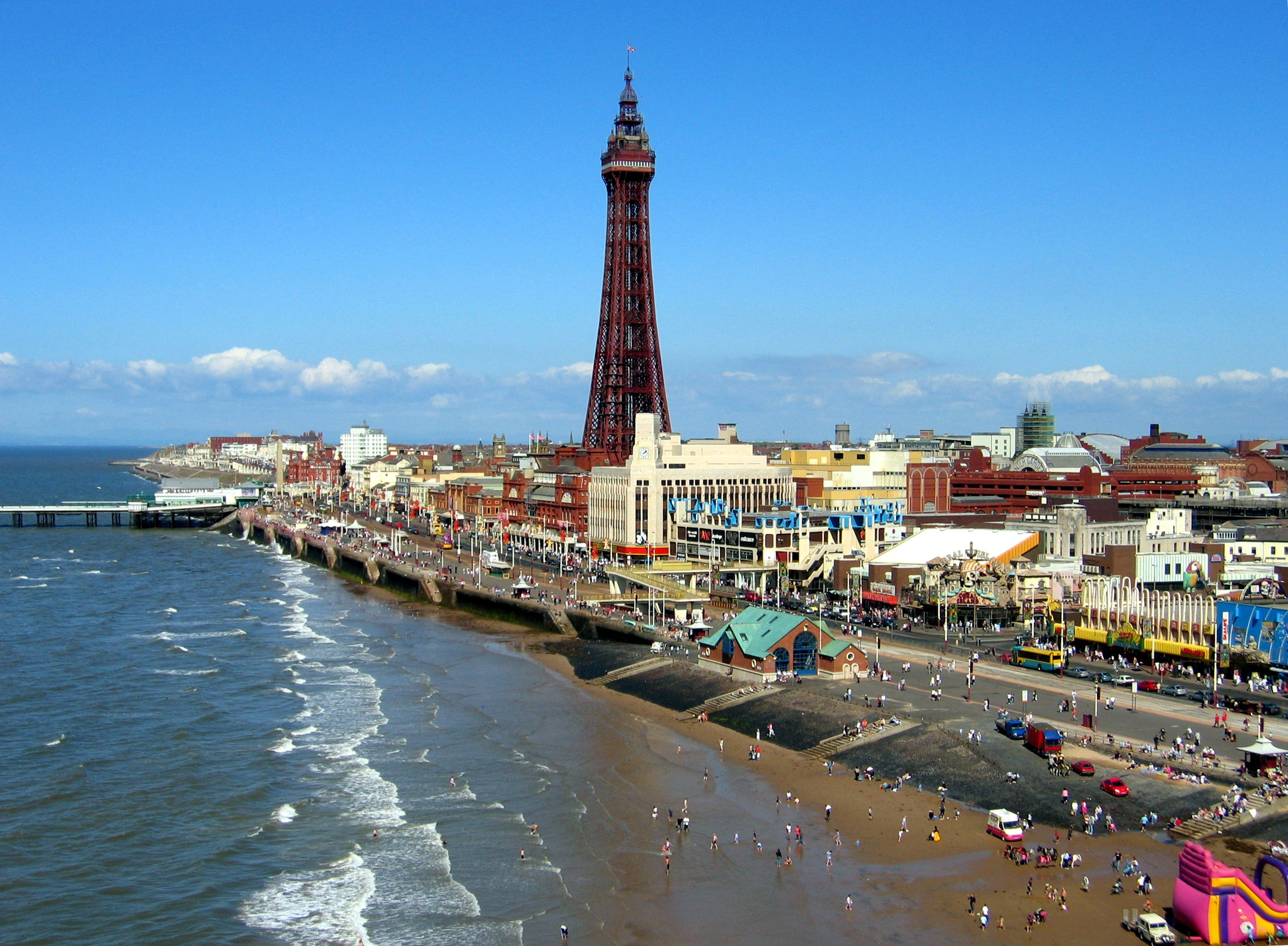
Blackpool, the coastal town in north-west England where Hoyle grew up.

Hoyle found it difficult growing up gay in Blackpool, later telling a reporter from The Times that people found out about his sexuality whilst at secondary school. He was subsequently bullied, and felt that going to school was "like walking to your death on a daily basis. Knowing that you were going to get assaulted, knowing that you didn't have anybody to talk to." Although the teachers knew of the bullying that he faced, they did nothing to stop it, believing that "by subjecting me to violence it would make me heterosexual." The stress led him to suffer a mental breakdown when he was fourteen, although the doctors who treated him "pathologised my natural behaviour and tried to give me tablets for it", something which he thought caused him even greater suffering.

Hoyle's family were Anglican, and he sang in the local church choir, however he had a problem with those Christians who were "very quick to seize on the Bible to condemn you". His parents recognised his sexuality, but had difficulty accepting it, although Hoyle has remarked that they did so out of "kindness and concern" for how he would develop as an adult. Hoyle gained some relief from the persecution he faced however by visiting the comedians and performers that used to appear at Blackpool every summer, such as Ken Dodd and Dorothy Squires, and he particularly adored the circus, later relating that "I thought its performers were the most glamorous people. Beyond beautiful."

It was when he was seventeen that he first went out on to the gay scene, but was put off when the first thing that anyone said to him was "you're not fuckable." It was around the same time that he began performing in the Belle Vue, a pub in Blackpool, where he did comedy routines whilst in the character of Paul Munnery-Vain (the name being a pun on pulmonary vein), the illegitimate offspring of the Duke of Edinburgh and Dorothy Squires. He found that many of the punters enjoyed his performances, although was unnerved that some of them made sexual advances toward him.

Aged twenty-one, he then left Blackpool and moved south to London, where he began to actively socialise in the city's gay scene. Here he temporarily gained a job playing the role of hunchbacked butler Riff-Raff in a stage production of The Rocky Horror Show, although was forced to quit when his alcohol and illegal drug intake got out of control. He would later comment that in London during these years he had "a lovely time. It was like going out for a night and it carried on for three years." However, it was during the 1980s that the HIV/AIDS epidemic hit the gay population and with little education or medical treatments, several of his friends' contracted and died of the virus; "people started to drop like flies. In our early twenties, we were losing our friends similarly to people of pension age." Partly because of the epidemic, Hoyle decided to leave London, moving back up north and settling down in Manchester.

== Career ==
=== The Divine David: 1990–2000 ===
David Hoyle first came to prominence through the clubbing scene around Manchester's Gay Village in the early 1990s, when club nights introduced performance elements to add to their experience. Hoyle was the host and compere at Manchester's Paradise Factory nightclub, and was also involved in the early days of the superclub Manumission, when it started as a club night in Manchester. He came to the notice of a London audience via his weekly performances at Duckie, from 1995 onwards. Soon after, Louise Gray published the first national press interview with Hoyle ('David versus Goliath', 29 November 1996). He also performed at the Queer Up North festival and the Leeds conceptual art club 'Freakshow'. Hoyle began appearing as a character whom he called 'The Divine David', which would later be described by reporter Ben Walters as "a sort of anti-drag act caustically lamenting the narcissism of the gay mainstream... through song, dance, painting and whatever else took his fancy." Other elements of his performance included pole dancing, mural painting and even striptease. Meanwhile, Hoyle had begun indulging in large quantities of alcohol and illegal drugs, leading to a "lot of near-death experiences".

Aside from his performances as the Divine David, Hoyle also acted in various other roles; in 1998, he appeared prominently in the music video for Faith No More's cover of "I Started a Joke", whilst that same year, he also appeared as a cameo in Todd Haynes's film Velvet Goldmine playing Freddi, a member of Brian Slade's entourage.

Hoyle appeared regularly as The Divine David in the BBC's sketch show Comedy Nation (1998) and achieved national prominence with his 1998 arts TV show The Divine David Presents on Channel 4, also under his stage persona. This was followed a year later by the series The Divine David Heals.

In 2000, Hoyle publicly killed off the Divine David in a show entitled The Divine David on Ice which was held at Streatham Ice Rink in London; at the end of the show, the character died to the soundtrack David Bowie's "Rock 'n' Roll Suicide". Commenting on the reason for killing off The Divine David, Hoyle would relate that:

In a way the Divine David became the patron saint of decadence and nihilism and all the rest of it, and it's hard for that not to affect your own actions... As much as I used to say, "Oh yes, you have to be very sure of your identity to be doing all this business," I don't think I actually was. If you're used to creating aliases and camouflage and all that sort of palaver, eventually you have to peel it all away and work out who you are.

Temporarily abandoning his career and retreating to his Manchester home, he spent several years in a period of reflection, later relating that he spent much of this time simply staring at his wallpaper, "just rocking to and fro, you know, the days merging, the seasons coming and going." Suffering a nervous breakdown, Hoyle gained most of his satisfaction from helping out his neighbours at their local housing association-backed communal garden, finding that being amongst plants aided his mental recovery.

=== Nathan Barley and a return to the stage: 2005–2008 ===
Emerging from five years as a recluse, in 2005 Hoyle appeared in the Channel 4 sitcom Nathan Barley, written by television satirists and comedians Charlie Brooker and Chris Morris. In Nathan Barley, which only ran for one series, Hoyle played an ageing popstar named Doug Rocket, a founding member of a band named The Veryphonics (thereby being a parody of David A. Stewart, the founding member of 1980s synthpop band Eurythmics).

"If it is a comeback then it's David Hoyle who's coming back, not the Divine David. I'm convinced that the Divine David's definitely got rigor mortis. Even though I died on ice, I think the body's gone in the lime pit... At 43 I just thought, well, maybe you should just try being David Hoyle, see how it goes."

— David Hoyle, 2006

In 2006 he finally returned to the stage, taking part in the It's Queer Up North festival, during which he constructed a garden inside Manchester's Contact Theatre. His garden project was a success, with the run having to be extended to meet demand. In June of that year he also appeared in a one-off informal show at Bush Hall, London, entitled When David met Justin and during which he chatted and shared music with transgender American cabaret performer Justin Bond.

He subsequently met theatre director Sarah Frankcom, who helped him to produce a show known as David Hoyle's SOS, which toured the UK in 2006. Considering it to be his most autobiographical show to date, Hoyle told a reporter that it was inspired by his childhood growing up in Blackpool, commenting that "you've got all that showbusiness seaside stuff going on" in it.

In 2007, Hoyle launched a new ten-part show at the Royal Vauxhall Tavern in London, produced by fellow avant-garde performer Duckie, entitled Magazine. Each week, Hoyle would deal with a different subject, examining such topics as immigration, crime and punishment, dogging, HIV/AIDS, women's issues and alcoholism. In doing so he hoped that he could get his audience thinking about intellectual topics, stating that "All I can provide with Magazine is a microcosm of a macrocosm... But at the Royal Vauxhall Tavern the truth will be revealed and it will be a shared experience and there will be a mass lifting of consciousness. That's all I can say." For the performance dealing with HIV/AIDS, Hoyle screened a short film of his own HIV test that was taken earlier that day, the first which he had had in twenty years. The result came out negative, but as reporter Lyn Gardner remarked, "had it been positive, I am certain he would still have shown us the clip." That same year, Hoyle also worked with the experimental theatre troupe Victoria.

=== Continuing stage work and the Avant Garde Alliance: 2009 ===
In 2009, Hoyle also opened a new show named Dave's Drop-in Centre at the Royal Vauxhall Tavern in London. Describing the show to a reporter, he commented that it was "loosely inspired by a psychiatric daycare centre, and all the activities that go on, from occupational therapy to hobbies to empowerment, group catharsis." Spread over a series of six Thursday nights, in each show Hoyle collaborated with a different performer to explore a variety of topics; for instance with burlesque comedian Fancy Chance he dealt with nationalism and immigration whilst with Dickie Beau he looked into the theme of childhood.

"We really need to celebrate our very vibrant LGBTQ community here in this particular geo-political zone. There's far too little homosexuality on television... on the radio, in CDs and DVDs. We need to be showing films that promote homosexuality 24 hours a day, on every channel,... and I'm talking quite biological films, that really show what goes on."

— Part of David Hoyle's election pledges, 2009.

In October–November 2009, Hoyle presented a piece of performance art at London's Chelsea Theatre as a part of their SACRED season. Entitled Theatre of Therapy and directed by Nathan Evans, it involved Hoyle interviewing audience members whilst sitting on a couch that once belonged to pioneering psychoanalyst Sigmund Freud (1856–1939) when the latter had lived in Hampstead, North London. Describing the use of such an artefact, Hoyle told a journalist that "The couch will be electrically charged with the vibration of Freud's voice. I plan to have a relationship with it."

In 2009, Hoyle publicly proclaimed that he was intending to stand for election as a member of parliament in the Vauxhall constituency in south London. Standing as a representative of the Avant-Garde Alliance Party, he proclaimed that, should he come into power, he would advocate killing local priests and other authority figures to bring about "a new way, a new way of being, a new way of living, a new way of responding. No longer are we going to look to others to tell us how to be." These "pseudo-faux-adult parental figures", Hoyle claimed, "have had a jolly good run for their money and it's now time for them to fuck off". He further went on to advocate polygamy and encouraged more sex (including "inter-species love [and] inter-generational sex"), believing that it would cut crime rates. Furthermore, he argued for an overhaul of the workplace system, encouraging people to adopt a "spiritual dimension" to their jobs, and called for the abolition of the arms trade, with weapons factories being converted into social housing.

=== Uncle David and further stage work: 2010–2012 ===
In 2010, Hoyle premiered his first feature film, Uncle David, which he had both directed and starred in, at the London Lesbian and Gay Film Festival. Set in and around a caravan park in the Isle of Sheppey in Kent, Uncle David featured Hoyle in the title role as a man living with his adolescent nephew (played by Ashley Ryder, a "boyish porn actor" who had collaborated with Hoyle in some of his stage shows). The film explored the relationship between the two characters, with the action unfolding over a couple of days, with one reviewer writing that "Suspense and dread accumulate as the low-key naturalism and the characters' obvious affection for one another play-off against the enormity of what looms ahead." In November of that year, Hoyle and Ryder were awarded a shared Best Actor Award for their roles in the film at Chéries-Chéris, Paris Gay, Lesbian, Trans, Film Festival. Meanwhile, in December of that year he filmed a special Christmas message for the socially liberal newspaper The Guardian. In the run up the 2010 United Kingdom general election Hoyle announced his support for fellow queer-identified figure David Joseph Henry running against Hazel Blears in Salford and Eccles (UK Parliament constituency) by hosting the "Hazel Must Go" campaign's Launch Party standing for the Trade Unionist and Socialist Coalition.

"The songs collectively tell some sort of story: from okay to devastation and back again. They illustrate a life lived – not an easy life, and I've sure been good at attracting trouble, perhaps both real and imagined. That is the beauty of song – uniting the fantasy with the grim reality, a Hadron Collider of emotion. However, there's also a sense of reflection, pausing to perhaps embrace a different tempo for what remains of my life."

— David Hoyle discussing Unplugged, 2011

In August 2011, Hoyle produced his first musical show, Unplugged, at London's Soho Theatre, during which he sang a medley of songs, some of which were covers and others which were his own creation. Directed by regular Hoyle collaborator Nathan Evans, the music was directed by Michael Roulston, and included a series of songs that had a "personal connection" to him; covers of Nine Inch Nails's "Hurt", New Order's "True Faith", Joseph McCarthy's "You Made Me Love You (I Didn't Want to Do It)", Stephen Sondheim's "Losing My Mind" and Tony Christie's "How Can I Entertain?", as well as a new song, "A Return to Trauma". Journalist Paul Vale of The Stage noted that it was "something of a departure" from Hoyle's earlier work, and that he was "almost sanitised" in his behaviour, providing "a healthy dialogue with his audience", discussing his "progressive views on education and a tongue-in-cheek dissection of avant-garde performance art, but mostly the chit-chat is either friendly or amiably abusive." Whilst noting that "Hoyle's anecdotes and wit were in full flow from the start", the reporter Jamie Fisher of the Pink Paper was more critical, noting that many would be "put off by his reliance on lavatorial humour and random avant-garde style", believing that he was destined to appeal "to a cult audience only".

In December 2012 Hoyle returned to the Soho Theatre with a stage show collection of songs written with Richard Thomas, covering a variety of topics raging from 'Gays in the Military' to the scandals of the BBC over the ages. Merrie Hell covers the dark side of the Christmas holidays set against melodies disjointed from the reality of subject covered within the show, with Thomas, who scored Jerry Springer: The Opera, helping bring levity alongside reflection and filthy humour.

=== 2020s: Aviva Studios Residency and Mugler ===
In 2024, Hoyle had a retrospective residency at Aviva Studios at Factory International in Manchester.

In 2026, Hoyle appeared in a series of short videos explaining “How to wear Mugler” at the invitation of Miguel Castro Freitas, since 2025 the creative director of Mugler.

== Personal life ==
"I would ban capitalism – the cruellest, most insulting system any so-called civilisation could choose to impose upon itself. I would declare every sentient being legally equal, i.e. plankton is equal to someone educated at Eton. And every new born individual would be issued with a global share portfolio which they may then choose to re-invest in their own education."

— David Hoyle discussing his political views, 2009

A supporter of LGBTQ rights, Hoyle has stated that should he ever be in a position of political power, "I would remove anyone who's vaguely homophobic to a concentration camp outside the M25, where they could keep each other company until such time as it was deemed appropriate for them to be dispatched." Nonetheless, Hoyle remains critical of the mainstream gay culture in Britain, believing it to be "off-the-peg" and generic, and describing it as "the biggest suicide cult in history". In his work he has attempted to fight against the idea that gay people are, "not socialist, not political, not left-field, just as pathetic and ridiculous as anybody else, that we couldn't give a fuck about anything as long as we can listen to Kylie and go shopping."

Hoyle suffers from mental breakdowns, something which he blames on his abusive childhood. He often raises the issue of mental health in his performances, relating that, "It's one of the last great taboos. People who would rush to help someone with a broken leg run away when someone has a mental health problem." Hoyle is also a painter, often reflecting his own life in his work; one of his works was for instance titled, "Hi, I'm David and 48 and Returning to Psychiatric Help Which is in the Public Interest". His character, Doug Rocket in Nathan Barley mentions nervous breakdowns when talking about the fictional group The Veryphonics. Rocket says, "It induced the first of many nervous breakdowns, all of which I've chosen to ignore."

== Filmography and resume ==
=== Live shows ===
Title	Year	Held	Notes	
The Divine David on Ice	2000	Streatham Ice Arena, London		
David Hoyle's SOS	2006–07	Royal Exchange Theatre, Manchester; Soho Theatre, London		
SOS	2007	Sydney Opera House, Studio, Sydney		
Magazine	2007	Royal Vauxhall Tavern, London	Six different shows, each one performed on a Thursday.	
Magazine Reprint	2007	Royal Vauxhall Tavern, London	A repeat of Magazine.	
Dave's Drop-In	2009	Royal Vauxhall Tavern, London	Six different shows, each one performed on a Thursday.	
David Hoyle's Aural Assault	24 September 2009	Royal Vauxhall Tavern, London	Four different shows, each one performed on a Thursday.	
David Hoyle's Licking Wounds	07, 14, 21, 28 January and 4 February 2010	Royal Vauxhall Tavern, London	Five different shows, each one performed on a Thursday.	
Slurry	01, 08, 15, 22, 29 September and 6 October 2010	Royal Vauxhall Tavern, London	Six different shows, each one performed on a Thursday.	
David Hoyle's Lives	06, 13, 20, 27 January and 03, 10 February 2011	Royal Vauxhall Tavern, London		
David Hoyle's Lives 2	26 May and 02, 09, 16, 23, 30 June 2011	Royal Vauxhall Tavern, London		
Unplugged	6–20 August 2011	Soho Theatre, London		
David Hoyle's Winter Warmer	17, 24 November and 01, 08, 15, 22 December 2011	Royal Vauxhall Tavern, London	Featuring two guest performers each week, including Al Pillay & Andi Fraggs.	
Pandrogyna	2012	Royal Vauxhall Tavern, London	Featuring two guest performers each week.	
The Ugly Spirit	2012	National Tour and culminating at Queen's Hall Southbank, London	Produced by Fittings Multimedia Arts for Cultural Olympiad	Lead Artist and performer
Merrie Hell	2012	Soho Theatre, London	Written with Richard Thomas.	
Guiding Light	2013	Royal Vauxhall Tavern, London	Featuring guest performers each week and an appearance from Pam.	
Heavenly Voices	2013	Royal Vauxhall Tavern, London	Featuring a musical act each week.	
Gender Trouble with David Hoyle	2013	City of Women Festival, Ljubljana, Slovenia	Featuring guests Lois Weaver, Mara Vujic, Lucy Hutson and Katy Baird.	

=== Filmography ===
Title	Year	Role	Notes
Velvet Goldmine	1998	Freddi	Feature film
Uncle David	2010	Uncle David	Directed and starring Hoyle.
The Psychiatrist	2013	Dr Rosenburg	Unreleased
Set the Thames on Fire	2015	The Magician	Dir Ben Charles Edwards
"Spent the Day in Bed" music video	2017	Dancer	Dir Sophie Muller

=== Television credits ===
Title	Year	Role	Notes
The Divine David Presents	1998	The Divine David	Produced for Channel 4.
The Divine David Heals	2000	The Divine David	Produced for Channel 4.
Nathan Barley	2005	Doug Rocket	Produced for Channel 4.

- Magazine: The Reprint (2007) – a DVD with some of these performances has been published by Duckie
- "David's Debatables" (2007 – ) monthly column for GT(Gay Times) Magazine since 2007
- "This Is My Fucking Truth" – Performance at the Project Arts Centre, Dublin on 26 June 2009 as part of the Dublin LGBTQ Pride Festival 2009.
- Pride London 2009 – Appearance on the stage in Leicester Square, featuring a duet with Boy George, "Spoiling it for the Others"
- Gay Icons at the National Portrait Gallery – Promenade Performance with Escalator Finale 11 September 2009
- David Hoyle's Aural Assault – Four Thursdays in September 2009.
- Rules and Regulations – an art Installation as Artist in Residence at Battersea Arts Centre, 25 and 26 Sep 2009
- Nobody Got The Z-Man's Back – Spoken word piece on the life and career of former professional wrestler Tom Zenk, 25 January 2011, Northampton Derngate.
- Revelations (2012) – a DVD comprising the short films of David Hoyle and Nathan Evans published by Live Art Development Agency

== Reviews and press ==
- 2007

Timeout London, Interview by Ben Walters: ’Magazine‘ star David Hoyle plans to raise our consciousness through dogging'

- 2008

Gavin Butt: ‘Hoyle’s Humility’, (interview with David Hoyle), in Dance Theatre Journal, Vol. 23, No. 1, 2008.

- 2009

The Skinny, Posted by Paul Mitchell: David Hoyle – Still Really Rather Divine

The Times, Interview by Nancy Durrant: Comedian David Hoyle is no drag

Gay Icons Performance at the National Portrait Gallery

The Independent, Interview by Nancy Groves: Observations: Freud family sofa's takes a starring role in Theatre of Therapy
