= Thom McGinty =

Scottish-Irish actor and street mime (1952–1995)

- McGinty as The Diceman
- Born: Thomas McGinty; 1 April 1952; Glasgow, Scotland
- Died: 20 February 1995 (aged 42); Dublin, Ireland
- Cause of death: Complications of AIDS
- Other name: The Diceman
- Occupations: Actor, model, street artist
- Years active: 1976–1995

Thomas McGinty (1 April 1952 – 20 February 1995), known as The Diceman, was a Scottish-Irish actor, model, and street artist specialising in mime. Born in Scotland of Irish parentage, McGinty spent much of his life and career in Ireland, where he became a landmark living statue and one of the country's most popular street performers. He appeared in various plays and films, and through his work promoted political causes including gay rights in Ireland; he has been dubbed a "gay icon". He died in 1995 at age 42, from complications of AIDS.

== Life and career ==
Thomas McGinty was born in the outskirts of Glasgow on 1 April 1952, to Thomas and Mary McGinty (née O'Hara), both of whom had previously lived in Ireland. Thom was of Scottish-Irish nationality: at least one of his parents were of Irish origin – Mary was born in Baltinglass, County Wicklow – which granted him Irish citizenship. He had a brother and two sisters; the family would holiday each summer in Mary's hometown.

McGinty served as an altar boy and considered becoming a priest. Instead, he studied accountancy at Strathclyde University, but dropped out. He was a member of Strathclyde Theatre Group in the early 1970s before moving to Ireland in 1976 to work as a nude model at the National College of Art and Design. The name "The Diceman" came from one of McGinty's employers, The Diceman Games Shop, which was located first in an arcade on Grafton Street, Dublin, and then on South Anne Street.

He specialised in standing in the street – stock still, in complete silence, and in costume – for long periods of time like a living statue. He remained still until someone placed money at his feet. At that point, he would perform a wide wink in a pantomime style to acknowledge the person.

When the Gardaí (police) told him to move along for causing an obstruction in the street when crowds gathered to watch him, McGinty developed what he called a "zen walk", an extremely slow-motion walk that was really immobility in motion. Most of his costumes were exuberant and fanciful, and he appeared in such guises as the framed Mona Lisa, or Dracula, or as a light bulb, teapot, or clown.

On the subject of posing in the street, McGinty stated in an Out magazine interview in 1988: "It does have its drawbacks. Some people treat you as if you really were inhuman. Apart from kicking, punching, burning and other unprintable things they might do to you, people stand there discussing the hairs in your nose, the pimple protruding through the make-up or whether the beer belly is a cushion or an advanced pregnancy. You wouldn't want to be vain in this occupation but masochistic tendencies would help. I now operate with a minder."

He was charged with breach of the peace and with wearing a costume which could offend public decency, on 15 June 1991, for a street performance in which he wore nothing but a skimpy loin cloth that failed to cover his buttocks. McGinty called himself a "stillness artist" and "a human statue".

His first public performances in Dublin were as the "Dandelion Clown" at the Dandelion Market, a former bohemian market on St. Stephen's Green. During the 1980s and early 1990s, he became well-known and popular for performances on Grafton Street where he worked as a mime artist or otherwise performed in costume, to advertise the Diceman shop. When that went out of business, he was hired to advertise various other establishments, including Bewley's café, and he also promoted political causes through his work such as gay rights, the Birmingham Six, and human rights in Tibet. He lived for a time in the early 1980s in Baile Éamon behind Spiddal in County Galway where he formed The Dandelion Theatre Company.

In 1989, he appeared in the Gate Theatre production of Oscar Wilde's Salome, directed by Steven Berkoff, which transferred to the Edinburgh Festival and then to South Carolina. McGinty performed in The Maids by Jean Genet, and worked also in France, Holland, Germany, Russia, Spain, and Switzerland. He acted in two films, The Metal Man (1989) and Corkscrew (1990). He was a guest, twice, on the television chat programme, The Late Late Show, in the mid-1980s and again in 1994.

McGinty was considered an honorary Dubliner despite his Glasgow accent and origins. Hot Press dubbed him "Ireland's most famous street performer and an integral part of Grafton Street life for well over a decade". The Irish Independent labelled McGinty a "Dublin institution", as well as a "gay icon"–a viewpoint echoed by The Irish Times.

== Death and tributes ==
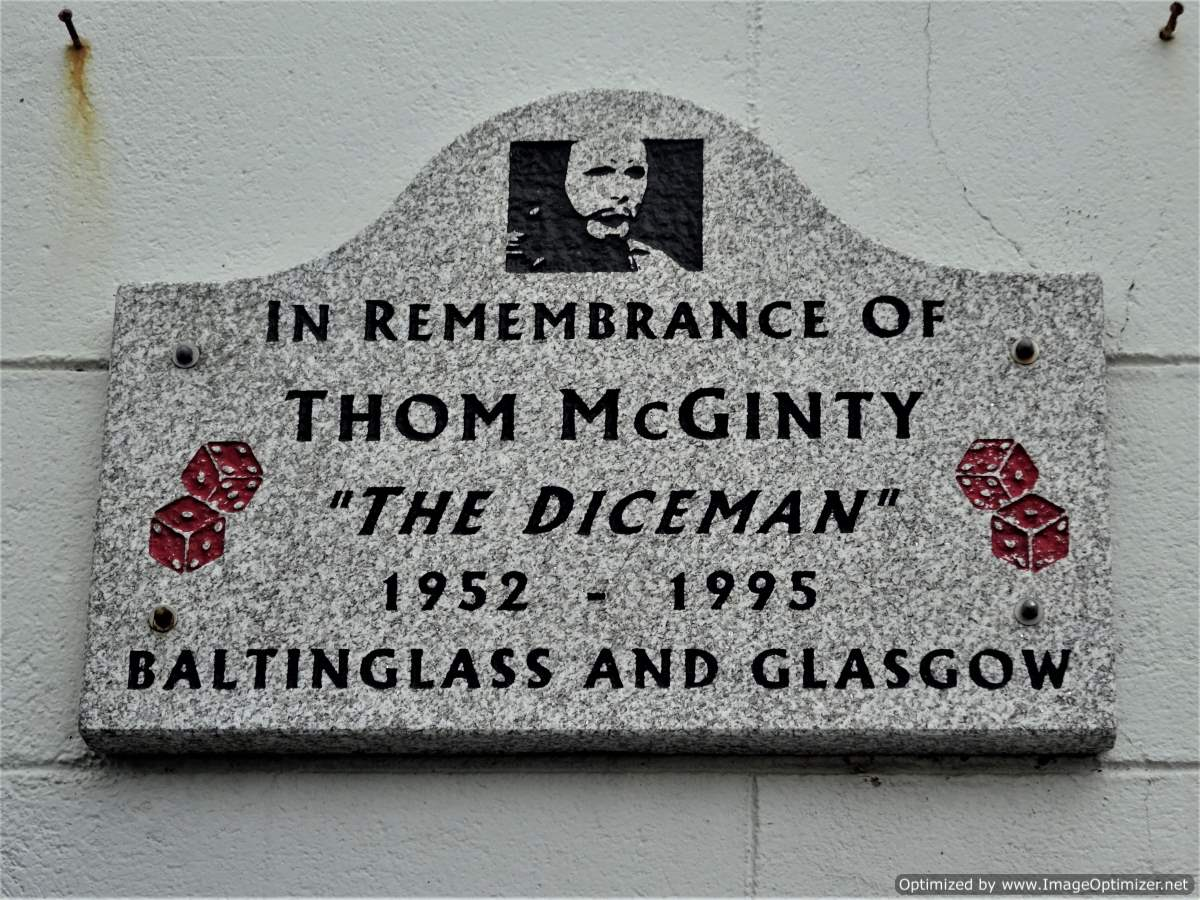
Plaque in Baltinglass

McGinty was diagnosed with HIV in 1990. At Halloween 1994, a tribute and benefit event was held in his honour at the Olympia Theatre at which he was crowned High King of Ireland, and money was raised to buy medicines, and to pay for his funeral. Two weeks later, he openly discussed his struggle with AIDS on The Late Late Show, an appearance considered by TheJournal.ie to have been "a brave move at a time when few people were prepared to admit in public that they had caught the AIDS virus".

McGinty died on 20 February 1995 after a sudden decline, aged 42. His coffin was carried the length of Grafton Street by his friends past a large crowd, and was accompanied by long and sustained applause. In 1997, the Lord Mayor of Dublin, Brendan Lynch, renamed a corner of Meeting House Square in Temple Bar as "The Diceman's Corner", where a plaque commemorates him. There was a tribute to McGinty in May 2001 when an exhibition of twenty of his most creative and colourful costumes, made mostly by Aidan Bradley and Kathy Kavanagh, was held during a music festival in Dublin Castle.

Two poems about McGinty appeared in 2002: one called Diceman by Liam O'Meara, and the title poem of Paula Meehan's collection, Dharmakaya, is also about him.

McGinty, McGinty, your number's up —
You winked, oh! you winked at death:
Rather you had blinked.

— Liam O'Meara, Diceman

become a still pool
in the anarchic flow, the street's
unceasing carnival
of haunted and redeemed.

— Paula Meehan, Dharmakaya, for Thom McGinty

The poet Brendan Kennelly wrote a tribute to McGinty in the course of which he said, "Thom McGinty's magic has to do with his ability to mesmerise his audience, to lure them out of their busy city selves and to take them away into that land of perfect stillness where marvellous dreams are as normal as Bewley's sticky buns." Actor Alan Stanford proposed in 2005 that Grafton Street should have a statue of the performer. A song called "Diceman" was released by Rocky de Valera and the Gravediggers in 2007. A plaque in memory of McGinty was unveiled at the Baltinglass courthouse during the Baltinglass Street Festival on 27 August 2010. There is another plaque dedicated to him in Tralee, on the footpath in Denny Street at the corner of Castle Street where he performed during the Rose of Tralee festival.
