= Joseph Kramer (disambiguation) =

Joseph Kramer or first-name variants thereof may refer to:

- Joey Kramer (born 1950), American drummer for the band Aerosmith
- Josef Kramer (1906–1945), executed Nazi war criminal
- Josef Krämer (1879–1946), German gymnast and athlete
- Joseph Kramer (sexologist) (born 1947), American sexologist and filmmaker
- Joseph Kramer, owner of Millersburg Ferry in Pennsylvania in 1866
- Joseph Kramer, founder of Kramer Electronics headquartered in Tel Aviv, Israel
- Joseph Kramer, interpreter of Taoist sexual practices that underlie Yoni massage

== See also ==
- Joey Cramer (born 1973), Canadian actor
- Joe Kraemer (born 1964), American professional baseball pitcher
- Joe Kraemer (composer) (born 1971), American composer and conductor
- Joel Kramer (born 1955), American professional basketball player
- Joseph Kramm (1907–1991), American playwright, actor, and director
