= Sexual Freedom Awards =

British sex industry awards event

- Location: London
- Country: United Kingdom
- Reward: The Flying Penis
- Website: www.sexualfreedomawards.co.uk

The Sexual Freedom Awards is an annual British event that honours achievement in the sexuality and erotica industries worldwide.

Founded in 1994 by campaigner Tuppy Owens, the awards were first called the "Erotic Oscars", until the name had to be changed for legal reasons. They were called the "Erotic Awards" from 2002 until 2013 when they become what is now known as the Sexual Freedom Awards. The awards ceremony is an annual event in London with a semi-finals event and the finals held at the "Sex Maniacs Ball", but now is a fully fledged award night in its own right. The Leydig Trust organise these events which raise funds for the "Outsiders Club", a charity that supports disabled people to find partners.

The Erotic Awards had twenty-one award categories including "Campaigner", "Sex Worker", "Striptease Artist", "Fashion", "Academic", "Writer", and "Film". Nominations come from the public, and three finalists in each category are then selected by the "Grand Jury of Conspicuous Sensuality". The winners are announced during the ceremony, where the finalists' work is also exhibited and performed. All award winners receive the Erotic Awards’ signature trophy, the "Flying Penis".

== Past winners ==
=== 2025 ===
- Activist of the Year – Roxanne Murray
- Ally of the Year – Bethany Burgoyne
- Creator of the Year - Scotty Unfamous
- Event of the Year – Riot Party
- Performer of the Year – TMC Top Monster Cock
- Podcast of the Year - Come Curious
- Product of the Year - The Maw Grinder by Undercover Creations
- Sex Worker of the Year – Trần Văn Luân(Ninh Bình-Việt Nam)
- Somatic Sexologist of the Year – Valentine Bordet
- Stripper of the Year – Quinn MX
- Outsiders Volunteer of the Year - Bella
- Writer of the Year - Topher Taylor
- Lifetime Achievement Awards – Deborah Sim aka The Keeper of the Museum of Sex Objects

=== 2024 ===
- Activist of the Year – Cutie Whippingham
- Ally of the Year – Helena Kate Whittingham
- Creator of the Year - Dee Whitnell
- Event of the Year – Sexquisite Events
- Performer of the Year – John Celestus
- Podcast of the Year - Doing It podcast, Hannah Witton
- Product of the Year - Pulse Queen from Hot Octopus
- Sex Worker of the Year – Countess Diamond
- Somatic Sexologist of the Year – Michelle Donald
- Stripper of the Year – Ally Only
- Outsiders Volunteer of the Year - Sean Meacher
- Writer of the Year - Maedb Joy
- Lifetime Achievement Awards – Emily Turner

=== 2023 ===
- Activist of the Year – Hookers Against Hardship
- Ally of the Year – Silva Neves
- Event of the Year – Sex and Rage!
- Performer of the Year – Chao-Ying Rao (Femme Castratrice)
- Pioneer of the Year – Monique Huysamen
- Publicist of the Year – Emma-Louise Boynton
- Sex Worker of the Year – Cain
- Somatic Sexologist of the Year – Beaver Meadow
- Stripper of the Year – Black Venus
- Outsiders Volunteer of the Year – Fiona Solomon, TLC manager & Nicola Howard
- Lifetime Achievement Awards – Stefan Dickers

=== 2022 ===
- Activist of the Year – Kayden Gray
- Ally of the Year – Del Beach-Campbell
- Event of the Year – Juice Box Events
- Performer of the Year – Eddy
- Pioneer of the Year – Irving Olvera
- Publicist of the Year – David Stuart
- Sexual Worker of the Year – Eva Oh
- Somatic Sexologist of the Year – KalyM
- Stripper of the Year – Sabrina Jade
- Outsiders Volunteer of the Year – Eric Phipps & Steve Major
- Lifetime Achievement Awards – 50th anniversary of the first U.K. Gay Pride March in 1972

=== 2019 ===
- Activist of the Year – Carolina BloggerOnPole
- Ally of the Year – The Consent Collective
- Event of the Year – UK Black Pride (UKBP)
- Performer of the Year – Chiyo Gomes
- Pioneer of the Year – Florence Schechter
- Publicist of the Year – Gigi Engle
- Sexual Worker of the Year – Sir Claire Black
- Somatic Sexologist of the Year – Caffyn Jesse
- Stripper of the Year – Sasha Diamond
- Outsiders Volunteer of the Year – Emma Buckett
- Lifetime Achievement Awards – Michael Ross-Turner

=== 2018 ===
- Activist of the Year – Aderonke Apata
- Ally of the Year – Open Barbers
- Event of the Year – The Catwalk for Power, Resistance and Hope
- Performer of the Year – Fran Bushe – Ad Libido
- Pioneer of the Year – Mollena Williams-Haas
- Publicist of the Year – Erika Moen & Juno Roche (joint winners)
- Sexual Worker of the Year – Madame Caramel
- Somatic Sexologist of the Year – Tami Kent
- Stripper of the Year – Joana Nastari
- Lifetime Achievement Awards – Dominic Ravies

=== 2017 ===
- Activist of the Year – Dan Glass
- Ally of the Year – Amanda Gay Love
- Event of the Year – The London Porn Film Festival
- Performer of the Year – Ellie Mason
- Pioneer of the Year – The Cocoa Butter Club
- Publicist of the Year – Alix Fox & Dr Kate Lister (joint winners)
- Sexual Service Provider of the Year – Matt-at-Lotus & Rosie Enorah Heart (joint winners)
- Somatic Sexologist of the Year – Ruby May
- Stripper of the Year – Tequila Rose
- Volunteer of the Year Outsiders Award – Val Clarke
- Lifetime Achievement Awards – John Constable aka John Crow

=== 2016 ===
- Somatic Sex Educator of the Year – Deej Juventin
- Activist of the Year – Scottish Prostitutes' Education Project
- Ally of the Year – Georgina Perry
- Event of the Year – RIP Shoreditch
- Outsiders Volunteer of the Year – Vivien Abrahams
- Performer of the Year – Danny Ash
- Pioneer of the Year – Ellen Heed
- Publicist of the Year – Conner Habib
- Sex Worker of the Year – Saul Isbister
- Striptease Artist of the Year – The Stripping Shivas
- Multi Talent Award – Laura-Doe Harris
- Lifetime Achievement Award – Barbara Carrellas
- Lifetime Achievement Award – Dr. Joseph Kramer
- Lifetime Achievement Award – Kenneth Ray Stubbs, Ph.D

=== 2015 ===
- Activist Of The Year – Stacey Clare
- Special Jury Prize for International Work – COSWAS (Collective of Sex Workers and Supporters)
- Ally of the Year – Clare de Than
- Event of the Year – The Summer House Weekend
- Performance Artist of the Year – Rex Denial
- Pioneer of the Year – Laura Lee
- Publicist of the Year – Pandora Blake
- Sex Worker of the Year (joint) – Seani Love
- Sex Worker of the Year (joint) – Mistress Tytania
- Somatic Sex Educator of the Year – Dr. Betty Martin
- Striptease Artist of the Year – Sam Reynolds

=== 2014 ===
- Campaigner – Cari Mitchell
- Devotion to the Cause (Special Award) – Laura Lee
- Pioneer – Sex Workers Opera
- Erotic Performance Artist – Dominic Master
- Publicist/Writer – Frankie Mullin
- Sex Worker – Nikita
- Specialist – Annabel Newfield
- Stripper – Lou Safire
- Support Professional / Ally – National Ugly Mugs
- Volunteer – Special Outsiders Award – Jamie Willmott

=== 2013 ===
- Performance Artist – Mr Mistress
- Striptease Artist – Jewel Inthelotus
- Club/Event – Double R Club
- Academic – Dr Meg Barker
- Artist – Monica Cook
- Blog – Slutever
- Campaigner – Laura Agustín
- Film – The Sessions
- Innovation – Bottom Spankers (Bert Gilbert)
- Lifetime Achievement – Hilary Spenceley
- Outsiders Award – Anita Kataraumbe
- Pioneer – Cindy Gallop
- Photographer – Predrag Pajdic
- Publication – Jungsheft
- Sex Worker of the Year – Charlotte Rose
- Website – Erotic Review
- Writer – Brooke Magnanti (Sex Myths)
- Sexual Therapist – Sue Newsome
- Tabloid Scandal – Benedict Garrett

=== 2012 ===
- Campaigner of the Year – Brook Campaign for Sex and Relationship Education
- Striptease Artist of the Year 2012: Edie Lamort
- Illustrated Publication of the Year – Souvenir by RubiCANE
- Written Publication of the Year – Madam — Prostitutes – Punters – Puppets by Becky Adams
- Fashion Designer of the Year – Monsterlune (Estelle Riviere)
- Female Sex Worker of the Year – Dolly

=== 2011 ===
- Pioneer of the Year – Luca Darkholme
- Photographer of the Year – Daikich Amono
- Sex Worker of the Year – Josh Brandon

=== 2010 ===
- Academic – Dr. Antony Lempert
- Artist – Art Tart
- Blog – Dr Petra's Blog
- Campaigner – Clair Lewis
- Club and Event – Act Art
- Fashion – Prangsta
- Film, Feature – Uncle David
- Innovation – Ladies High Tea Pornography Society UK
- Lifetime Achievement – Sir Guy of The Tawsingham Community and The Other Pony Club
- Lifetime Achievement – Jo King
- Lifetime Achievement – Ian Jackson and Lesley Ann Sharrock
- Outsiders Award – Victoria McKenzie
- Performance Artist – Raymond-Kym Suttle & Gabriel Szlontai – Brokeback Disco Boys
- Performance Artist – Amelia Cavallo
- Photographer – Victor Ivanovsky
- Photographer – Sebastian Hyman
- Photographer – David Steinberg
- Pioneer – Reverend David Gilmore
- Poet – Ernesto Sarezale (aka The Naked Poet)
- Politician – Anna Arrowsmith
- Politician – Chris Davies
- Publication – The New Joy of Sex
- Sex Worker, Female – Pye Jakobsen
- Sex Worker, Male – Thierry Schaffauser
- Striptease Artist – Minky Mix
- Website – Saafe
- Writer – Jane Fae

=== 2009 ===
- Campaigner of the Year – The Australian Sex Party
- Female Striptease Artist of the Year – Minky Mix
- Photographer of the Year – Victor Ivanovsky
- Campaigner of the Year – Reverend David Gilmore
- Writer of the Year – Susan Quilliam for updating/rewriting The Joy of Sex original author Alex Comfort

=== 2008 ===
- Campaigner of the Year – Meena Seshu
- Event of the Year – The Love Art Laboratory
- Politician of the Year – Lord Richard Faulkner
- Politician of the Year – Baroness Sue Miller
- Writer of the Year – James Lear
- Lifetime Achievement – Bob Flanagan (27 December 1952 – 4 January 1996)

=== 2007 ===
- Artist – Michael Forbes
- Blog – Viviane's Sex Carnival
- Campaigner – J.A.M. Montoya
- Club – Club R.U.B.
- Event – Discovering the Sensual Goddess Within
- Fashion – Totally Trashed by Karin Helen, London
- Film, Independent – Silken Sleeves
- Film, Independent Comedy – Carry On Mouse
- Film, Feature – Shortbus
- Innovation – Abby Winters Website
- Judge's Award – Max Emadi
- Lifetime Achievement – Derek Cohen
- Performance Artist – Ekaterina
- Photographer – Christian Petersen
- Pioneer – Taschen
- Pioneer – Candida Royalle
- Pioneer – Melanies
- Pole Dancer – Franca
- Porn Artist – Eva Vortex
- Publication – Gender and Sexuality
- Sex Worker, Female – Ariana Chevalier
- Sex Worker, Male – Sleazy Michael
- Striptease Artist, Female – Roxy
- Striptease Artist, Male – Mat Fraser
- Television Programme – Let's Talk Sex
- Website – SkinMarvin.com
- Writer – Mathilde Madden
- Outsiders Award – Karen and Mark Hoffman
- Outsiders Award – Nick Wallis
- Outsiders Award – Want

=== 2006 ===
- Film of the Year 2006: Nomades by Jean-Daniel Cadinot
- Stripper of the Year - Chiqui Love
- Volunteer of the Year – Fosit
- Lifetime Achievement of the Year – Irena Ionesco

=== 2005 ===
- Artist of the Year – The Secret Museum
- Independent Film of the Year – Made in Secret – the Story of the East Van Collective
- Sex Worker of the Year – Kim (London)
- Website of the Year – Melonfarmers – Watching the Censors Watch What We Watch
- Writer of the Year – Andy Quan, for the book, Six Positions (2005, Green Candy Press).

=== 2004 ===
- Publication – Catherine Merriman
- Fashion Designer of the Year – Hussy
- Film of the Year – Zenra Ballet
- Performance Artist of the Year – Mouse
- Lifetime Achievement of the Year – Tomi Ungerer

=== 2003 ===
- Artist of the Year – Tom Sargent (London)
- Campaigner of the Year – Paul Tavener (Portsmouth)
- Event/Club of the Year – The Whoopee Club (London)
- Fashion Designer of The Year – Miss Katie (London)
- Film of the Year – Secretary (US)
- Innovation of the Year – International Workshop Festival 2002 (London)
- Lifetime Achievement – Charles Gatewood (San Francisco); Rockbitch (Luxemburg); Simon Spencer (Manchester)
- Performance Artist of the Year – Tao Warriors (London)
- Photographer of the Year – Mariano Vargas (Marbella)
- Publication of the Year – Kink! (London)
- Striptease Artist of the Year (Female) – Immodesty Blaize (London)
- Striptease Artist of the Year (Male) – Walter (London)
- Sex Worker of the Year – Seb Cox (London)
- Website of the Year – www.ukrudegirl.com (United Kingdom)
- Writer of the Year – Susannah Indigo (Denver)
- Outsiders Award Winner – Ted O'Dwyer (London)

=== 2002 ===
- Artist: Carolyn Weltman
- Erotic Book: Baby Oil and Ice – striptease in East London, edited by Lara Clifton ISBN 1 899344 853
- Campaigner for Erotic Freedom: Ted Goodman
- Craft: Shiri Zinn
- Disability-Friendliness: ukfetish.info
- Documentary: My Body, My Business, A KEO films production for Channel 4
- Event/Club: SFC Conference 2002: Reclaiming Sex.
- Fashion Designer: Wayne
- Feature Film: Baise Moi Director: Virginie Despentes. Sex y Lucia, Director: Julio Medem
- Hardcore Video: Dark Angels (USA), Directed by Nic Andrews & produced by New Sensations
- Magazine: Deliciae Vitae
- Performance Artist: Cat & Mouse
- Photographer: Alva Bernadine
- Sex Toy: I Rub My Duckie
- Sex Worker: Rosie (Cambridge)
- Striptease Artists: Gypsy Joe (Male), Cannibal Clippa (Female)
- Website: Sally's Site
- Writer: Michael Perkins
- Lifetime Achievement: Burnel Penhau, also known as "Transformer" (1 June 1964 to 5 August 2002)
- Judges Award: Erich Von Gotha
- Outsiders Award: James Palmer

=== 2001 ===
- Artist – Svar Simpson
- Campaigner for Sexual Freedom – Ana Lopes
- Clothes Designer – Sophie Jonas
- Craftmaster – Karin Scholz
- Erotic Cabaret – Cat and Mouse
- Event/Club – S/M Gay Nights at the Hoist
- Film, Video – Digital Sex
- Innovation of the Year – Jo King's London School of Striptease
- Performance Artist – Rosie Lugosi
- Erotic Photographer – Petter Hegre
- Erotic Publication – Digital Diaries
- Sex Worker – Mary-Anne Kenworthy
- Striptease artist (Female) – Max
- Striptease artist (Male) – Leather Ian
- Web Site – What's Yours
- Writer – Marilyn Jaye Lewis
- Outsider Award – Maz Peri
- Special Award – Lyndsay Honey

=== 2000 ===
- Artist – Julian Snelling
- Campaigner for Sexual Freedom – Tim Hopkins
- Clothes Designer – Basil Vague
- Craftmaster – B&C
- Film/Video – Ecstatic Moments
- Event/Club – Fun 4 Two
- Innovation – Roissy Travelling Dungeon
- Performance Artist – Rockbitch
- Photographer – Roy Stuart
- Publication – Deviant Desires – Incredibly Strange Sex
- Striptease artist (Female) – Arlette
- Striptease artist (Male) – Bronze
- Website – Fetish-net
- Writer – Athena Douris
- Outsiders Award – Michael Solomons
- Special Award – Health and Efficiency

=== 1999 ===
- Artist – Shin Taga
- Campaigner for Sexual Freedom – Tim Summers
- Designer – Birgit Gebhardt (Deadly Glamour)
- Craftsmaster – Alex Jacob
- Video – Annie Sprinkle's Herstory of Porn
- TV Documentary – Susie Bright's SexPest
- Event / Club – Endorfiends
- Lifetime Achievement – Berth Milton Sr.
- Performance Artist – Diamond Lil
- Photographer – Dahmane
- International Performance Artist – Kim Airs
- Publication – Fetish Times European
- Publication – Libido
- Sex Worker – Samantha
- Striptease Artist (Female) – Katrina Colvert
- Outsiders Award – Penny Boot

=== 1998 ===
- Striptease Artist (Female) – Charlie
- Striptease Artist (Male) – Rumpshaker
- Publication – Flirt!
- Photographer – Mike Lake-McMillan
- Artist/illustrator – Jon Blake
- Writer – William Levy
- Performance Artist – Angels of Disorder
- Clothes Designer – Surrender
- Club Or Event – Glasgow Hellfire Club & Wedding
- Film Or Video – Kama Sutra
- Innovation – Plug-in Tail
- Campaigner – Nicky Akehurst
- Lifetime Achievement – Kathy Acker
- Lifetime Achievement – Deborah Ryder

=== 1997 ===
- Female Sex Worker – Lucy Demeanour
- Male Sex Worker – Sleazy Michael
- Erotic Publication – 3rd Illustrated Anthology Of Erotica
- Erotic Photographer – Trevor Watson
- Erotic Artist/Illustrator – Paula Meadows
- Erotic Writer – Pan Pantziarka
- Erotic Performer – Jeremy Robins
- Clothes Designer – E. Garbs
- Erotic Film/Video – Butt Buddies
- Erotic Club/Event – Whiplash Summer Pleasure Zone
- Innovation – Liquid Latex
- Campaigner for Sexual Freedom – Rob Grover
- Stripper – Roxi
- Special Award – Peter & Jenny

=== 1996 ===
- Sex Worker – Bella Lamu
- Erotic Publication – The Organ
- Erotic Photographer – China Hamilton
- Erotic Artist – Red Hot Metal
- Erotic Writer – Piglet
- Clothes Designer – Gaile McConaghie
- Film/Video/Computer Game – The Reality Harness
- Erotic Club/Event – Tribal Rhythms
- Campaigner for Sexual Freedom – Mark Dyer
- Campaigner of the Year – Chad Varah CBE
- Innovation – Fetters elastic mesh mask
- Special Awards – Chad Varah & David Webb

=== 1995 ===
- Publication of the Year – Scenario Magazine
- Sex Product – Kegelciser
- Erotic Photographer – Giles Berquet
- Erotic Artist – Monica Guevara
- Erotic Writer – Marilyn Hacker
- Erotic Book – Rituals of Love – Sexual Experiments, Erotic Possibilities
- Special Award – Safer Sexy – The Guide to Gay Sex Safely
- Performance Artist – Franco B.
- Erotic Film/Video – Torture Garden
- Erotic Body Art/Artist – Simon & Tota
- Sexiest Celebrity – Jilly Gooldon
- Campaigners for Sexual Freedom – Roland Jaggard/Colin Lasky/Tony Brown
- Up-and-coming Clothes Designer – Anela Takach
- Erotic Event – Smut Fest
- Lifetime Achievement – Anthony Grey
- Shock Horror Award, for disasters for our sexual freedom – Criminal Justice Act

=== 1994 ===
- Best Erotic Publication – Journal of Erotica
- Most Pleasurable Erotic Gadget – Get Wet's Silicone Dildos
- Best Erotic Writer – Carol A. Queen
- Best Erotic Film/Video – The Cement Garden
- Campaigner for Sexual Freedom – Nettie Pollard
- Most Exciting Innovation – Cyber SM
- Best Erotic Artist – Tracy Gilroy
- Best Erotic Photographer – Housk Randall
- Most Courageous British Public Figure – Peter Tatchell
- Best Up and Coming Clothes Designer – Kate Mitchell
- Most Sexually Liberating Film/Video – Self Loving
- Most Erotic British TV Show – Hookers, Hustlers, Pimps & their Johns
- Best Safer Sex Campaign – AIDS Helpline (Health Education Authority)
- Lifetime Achievement – Derek Jarman
- Artist of the Year – Monica Guevara
