= Yoni massage =

Type of tantric erotic massage

An abstract stylized representation of the vulva hand-gesture (sometimes also known as the "Yoni sign" or "Yoni mudra")

Yoni massage or yonic massage, derived from the word Yoni, a representation of the vulva which symbolizes the goddess Shakti, is a type of Tantric full-body massage. It primarily focuses on the labia, clitoris, G-spot, uterus, the breasts, the anus and other erogenous zones. Yoni massage is the female equivalent of a Lingam massage. The massage is viewed as therapeutic and is sometimes used as a method of relieving tension, pain, or general discomfort of the vagina. It has been claimed by some practitioners to be helpful to achieve fertilisation, although there is no scientific support for this claim.

Contrary to some beliefs, the purpose of Yoni massage is not solely to achieve orgasm, although it commonly occurs during Yoni massage. This is presumably because of the higher rate of achieved orgasm during masturbation, compared to sexual intercourse. Due to the stimulation of the vulva, its clitoris, G-spot and if desired also the anus build-up, and combined and constant stimulation to the erogenous zones during the massage, achieving orgasm via Yoni massage is probable.

Yoni massage is sometimes offered in regular massage parlors, as well as parlors specializing in Tantric massage. Yoni massage is a fairly new branch within massage therapy, and is based on the interpretation of Taoist sexual practices by Joseph Kramer. It was originally a form of sex magic, and this is still somewhat incorporated in Yoni massage today.

== Practice ==
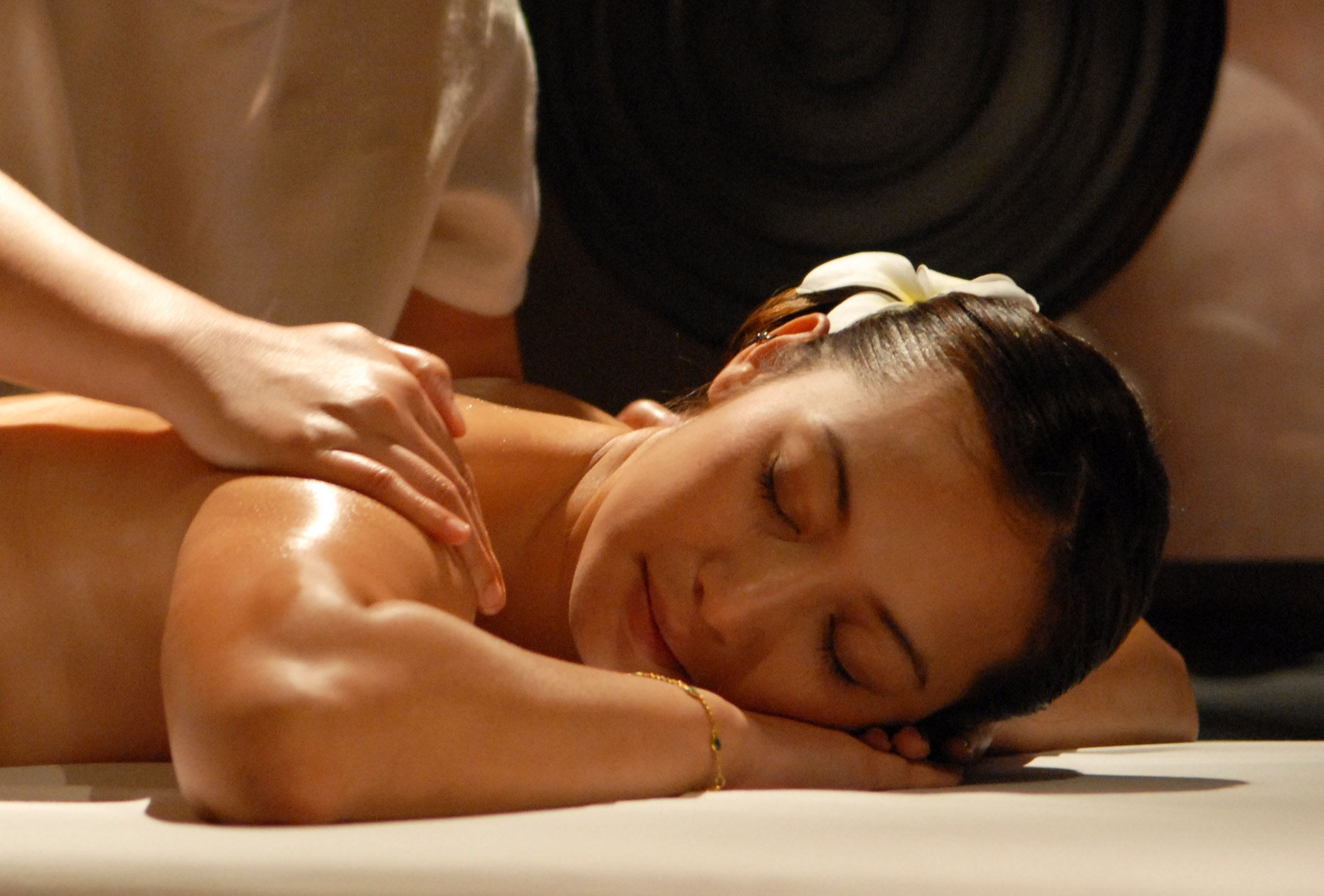
Relaxing back massage

A Yoni massage consists of the masseuse, called the giver, and the receiver of the massage, called the Shakta. The receiver is almost always naked, whilst the giver is clothed. The Yoni massage consists of several steps, slowly and gradually providing a build-up to the eventual vaginal stimulation. The massage begins with the receiver lying on her stomach, exposing the other side of the body, called the Yang side. After the massage of her entire rear body and buttocks, the receiver turns around, lying on her back, and the masseuse massages the Yin side. The massage continues, slowly transforming from whole body massage, to breast massage, to stimulation of the vulva, and finally deep vaginal stimulation. Massage oil, like in many other forms of massage, is not only used, but is also an essential part of the massage, to provide a sufficient amount of lubrication.

Depending on the training and preferences, the touches take place in many different variations, of which only a selection is shown here in the photographic representation on a vulva model. Unlike the silicone model, the vulva is usually still closed at the beginning and is touched only from the outside. During sexual arousal, which is enhanced by the warm oil, it slowly opens.

Practitioners use hands, and may use Yoni eggs to stimulate the pelvic floor. Yoni eggs are egg-shaped and are usually made from some sort of stone, such as jade.

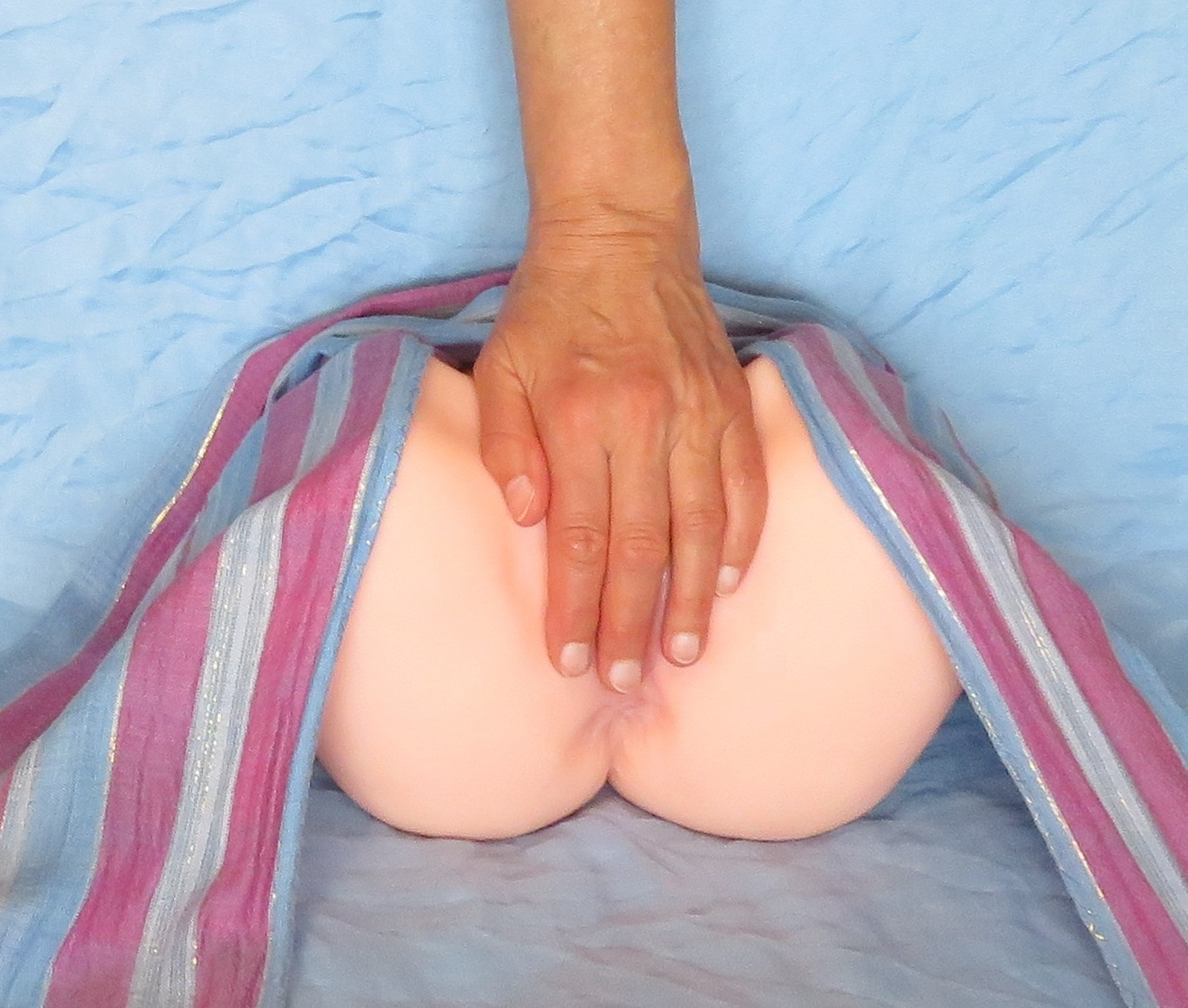
1. Placing the warm hand on the entire vulva

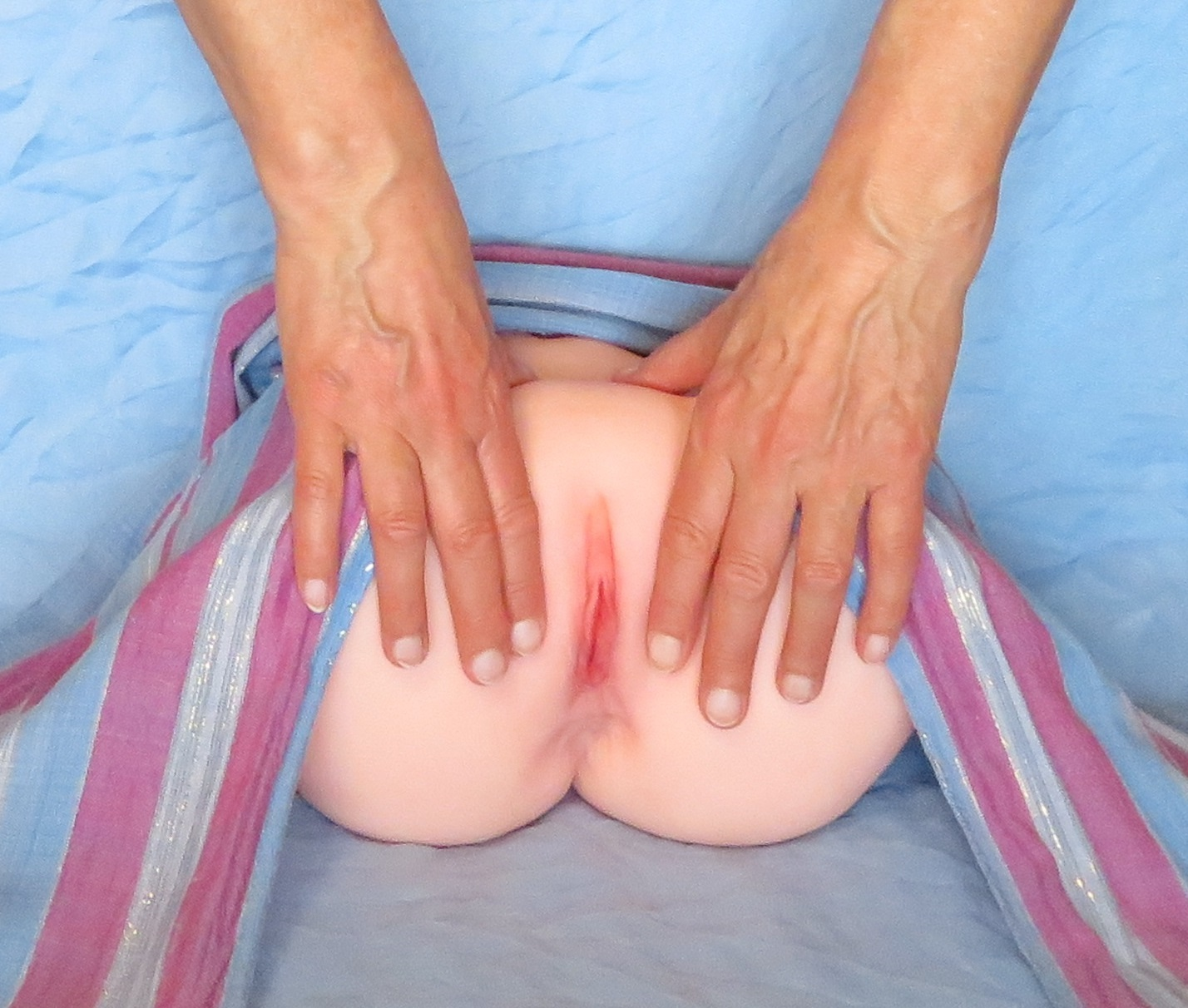
2. Stroking the bend between the vulva and the thigh

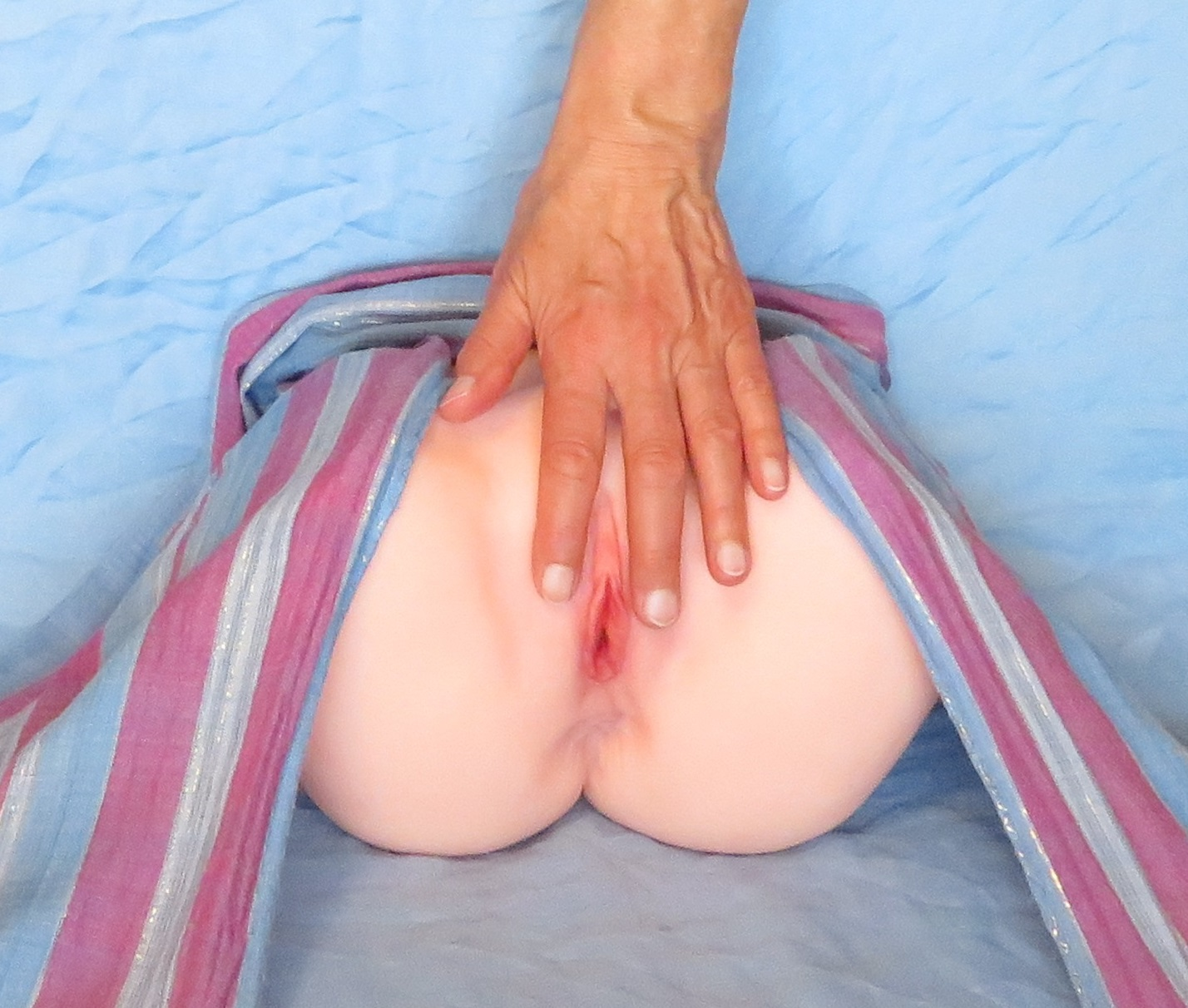
3. Stroking the labia majora lengthwise

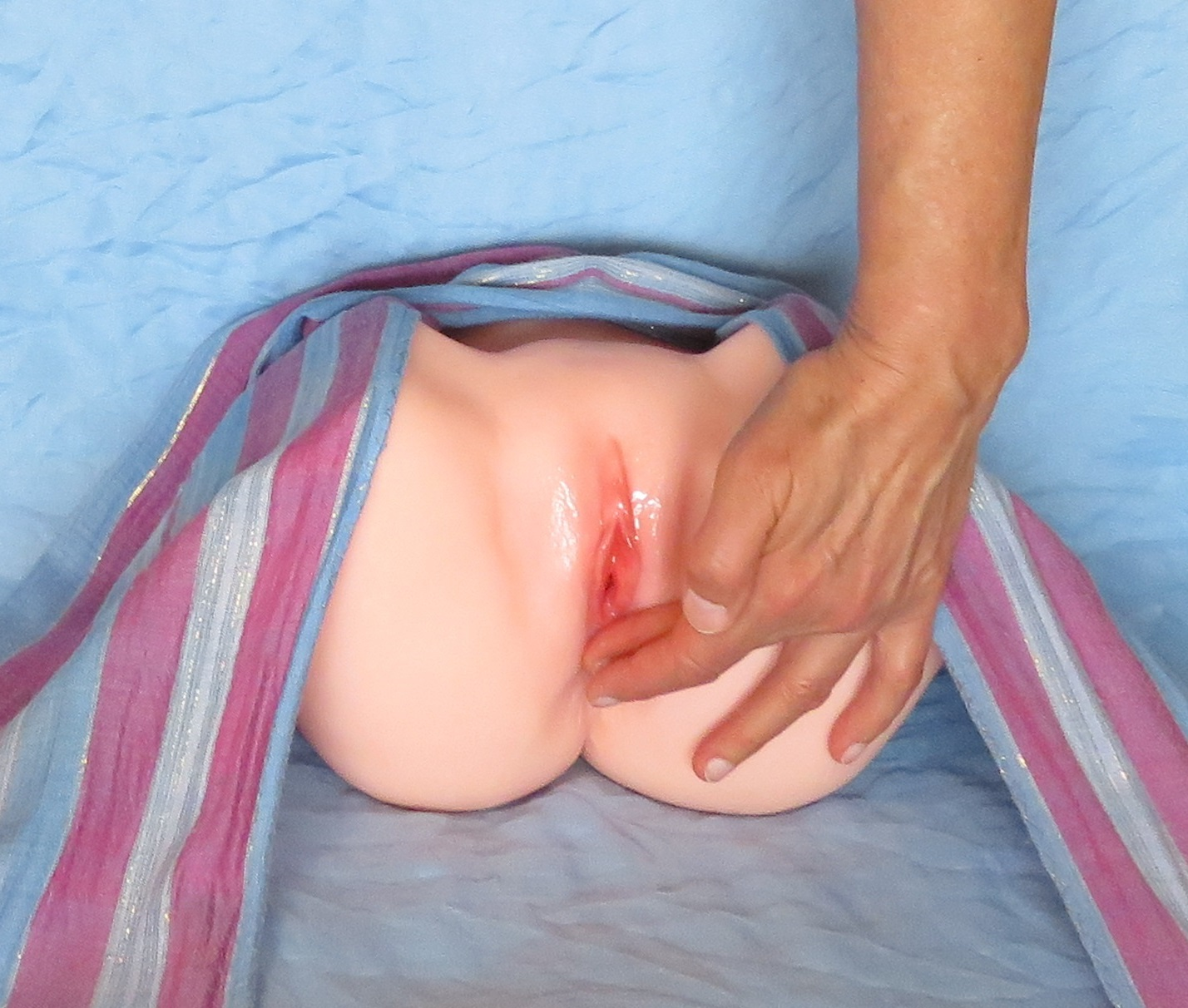
4. Gentle perineal massage

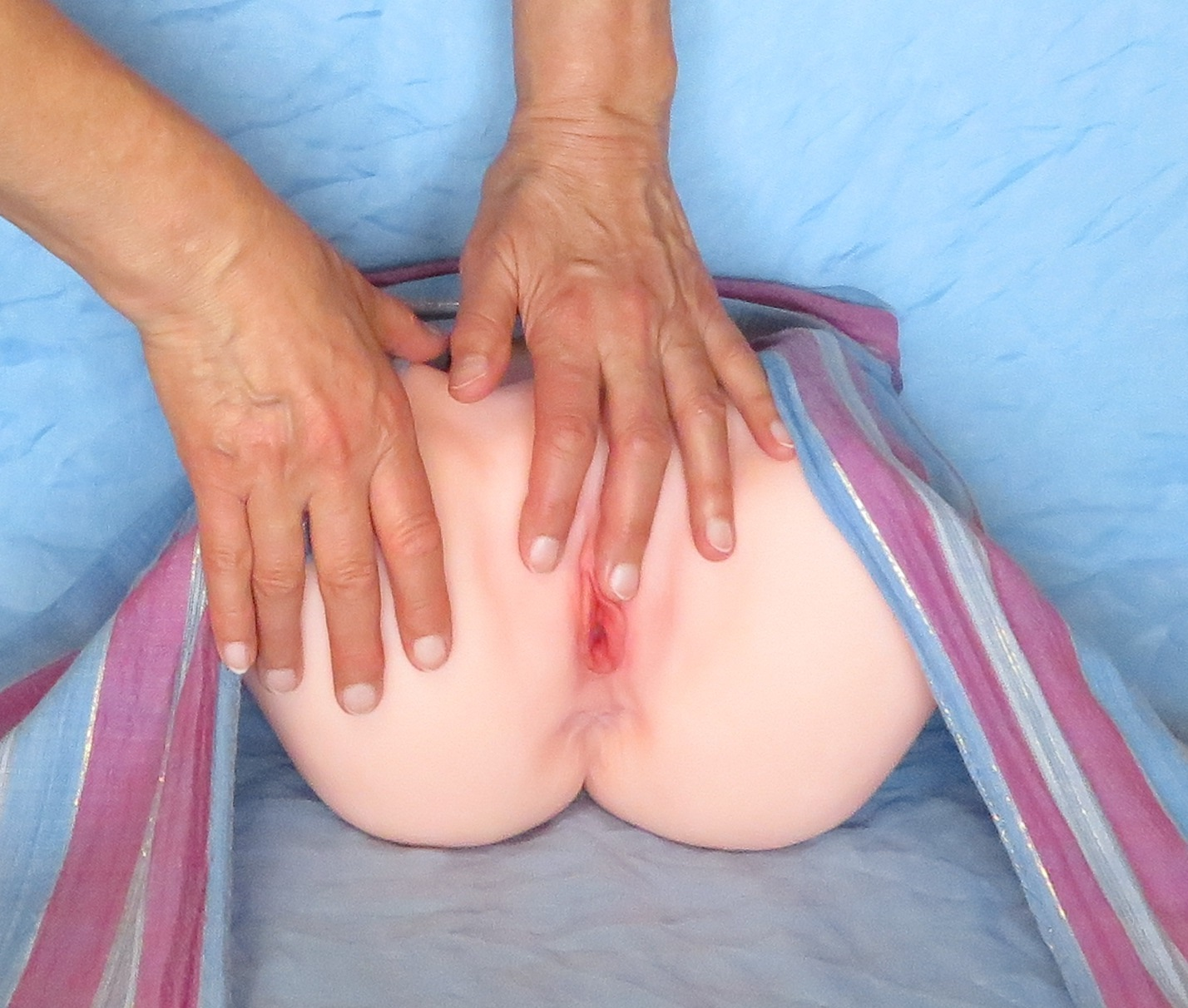
5. Stroking the clitoral glans

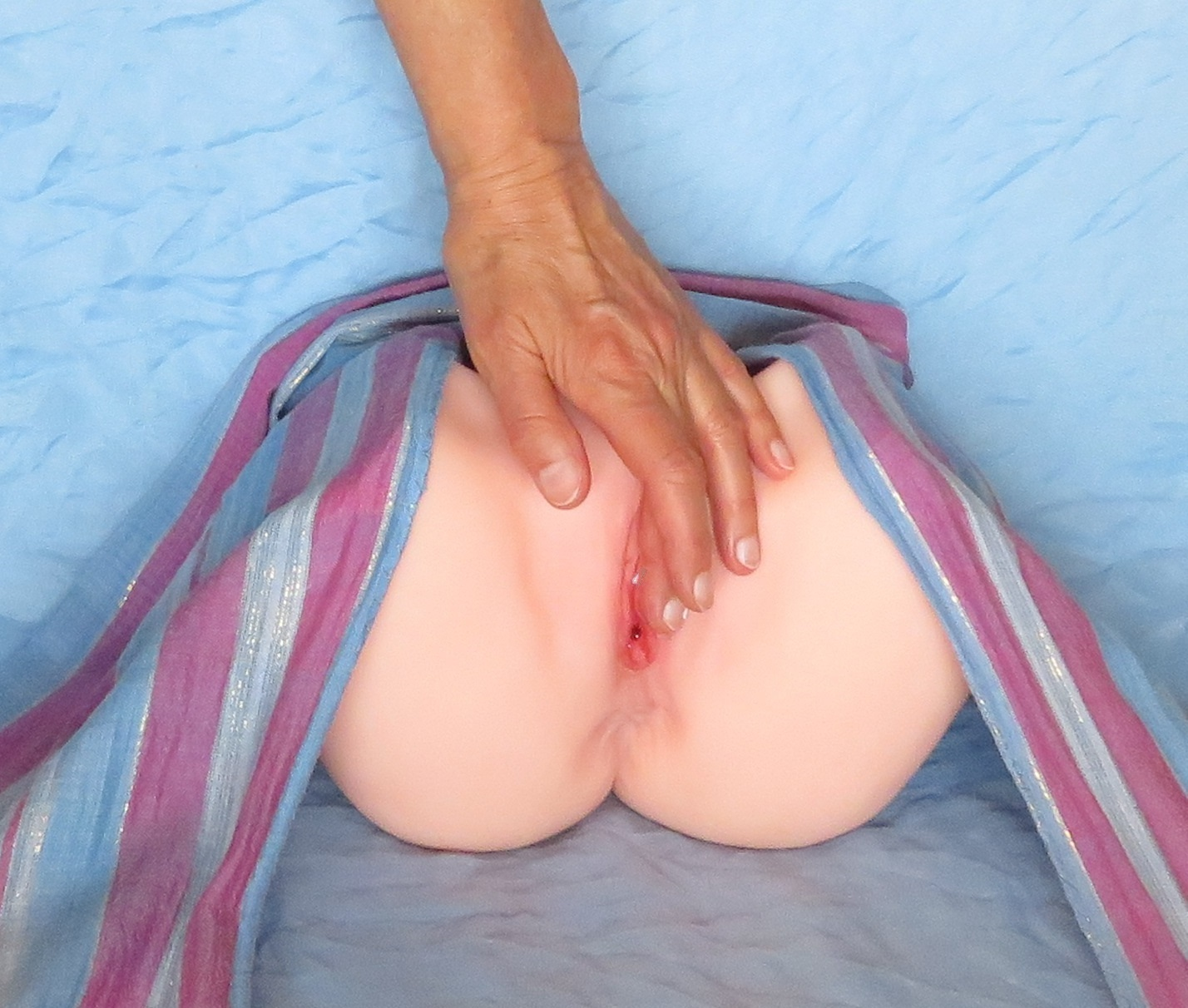
6. Stroking the labia minora

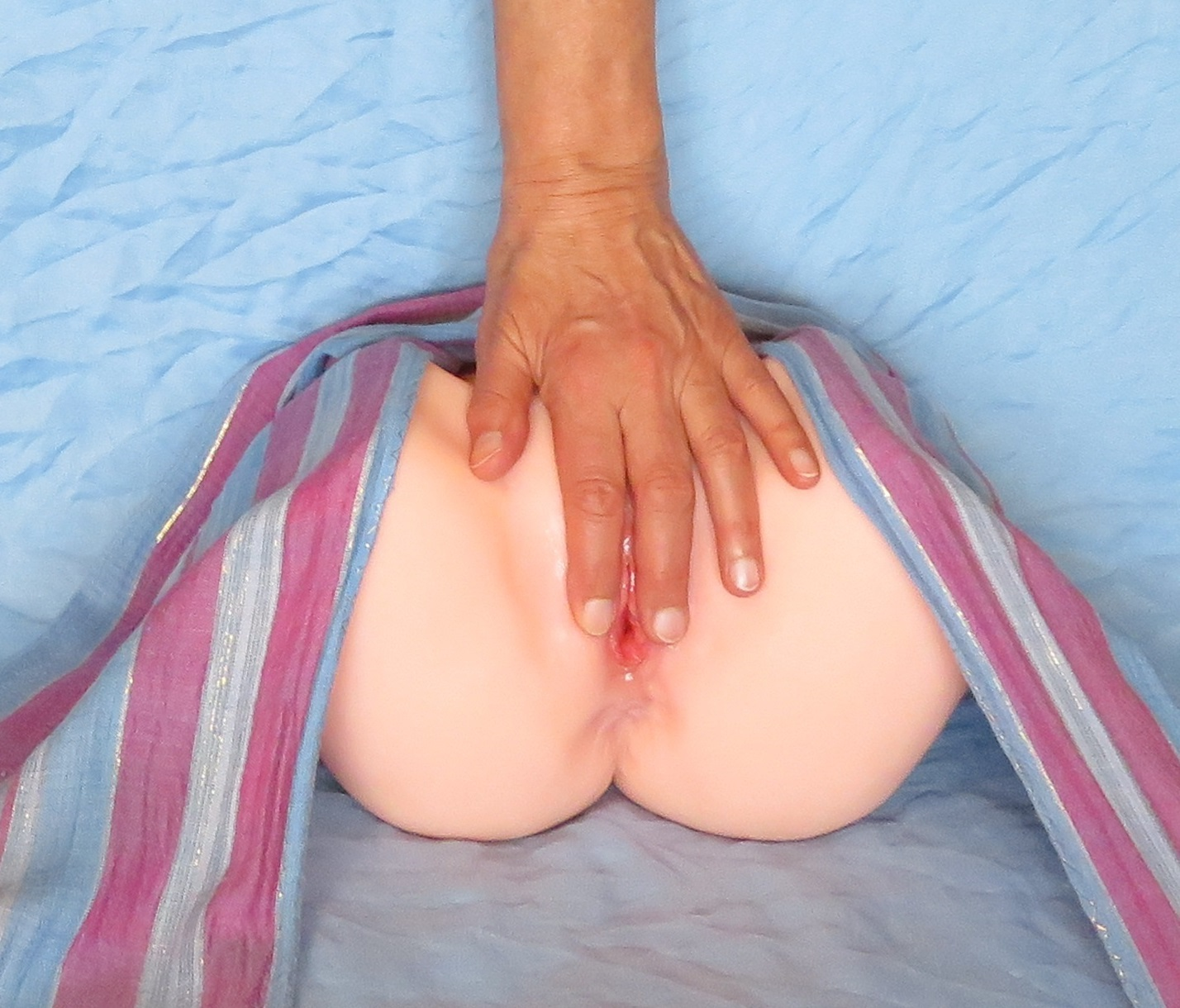
7. Stroking the labia minora

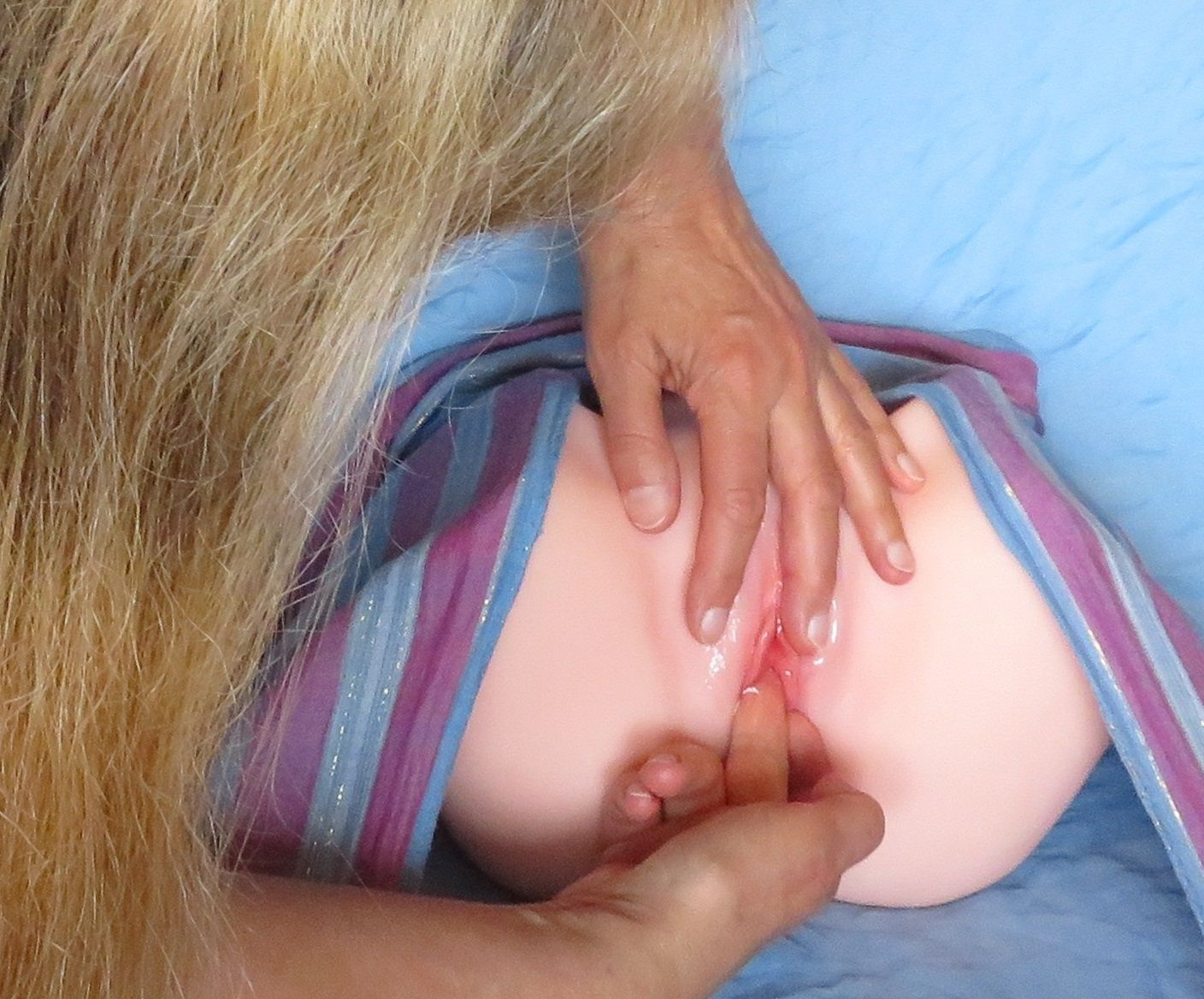
8. Penetration to the G-spot with further clitoral glans stimulation.

For the massage of the mucous membranes, a water-based, medically tested personal lubricant can be used as an alternative to oil. Applying the personal lubricant to the labia minora and to the clitoral glans enables pain-free, pleasure-inducing touches and massage strokes. Before penetrating the vagina, the finger must be moistened with the lubricant for the same reason. Figure 8 shows one of the techniques that are most likely to give the woman an orgasm.
