= Tantric massage =

One of two distinct types of massage

Tantric massage is a form of bodywork that may incorporate principles derived from Tantra, a spiritual tradition with roots in ancient India. Interpretations of tantric massage vary: some view it primarily as a form of erotic massage, while others approach it as a meditative or spiritual practice, which may not necessarily be pleasurable and can involve deep emotional or energetic processes. While tantric massage may include focused attention on erogenous or intimate areas of the body, its broader purpose is often described as the cultivation of awareness, connection, energetic flow and energetic system charge.

The term Tantra originates from esoteric teachings that developed in both Hindu and Buddhist contexts in the Indian subcontinent. In the Buddhist tradition, tantric teachings are traced back to Shakyamuni Buddha (circa 5th century BCE), with later formalizations emerging in texts and practices across India, Tibet, and Southeast Asia during the first millennium CE.

== Tantric massage as an erotic practice ==
In contemporary usage, the term "tantric massage" is frequently applied to services that are, in essence, erotic massages. These practices often incorporate elements such as sensual touch, breathwork, and stimulation of erogenous zones, including the yoni (yoni massage) or the lingam (lingam massage) and anal massage. While occasionally framed within a narrative of energy release or healing, their primary objective is the induction of physical pleasure and sexual gratification, often culminating in orgasm or ejaculation. This approach is commonly categorized under neotantric interpretations and diverges significantly from both traditional tantric teachings and modern spiritual applications of tantric massage.

Practitioners of erotic-style tantric massage typically focus on physical stimulation, and the sessions are tailored to deliver immediate sensory pleasure. Such massages do not necessarily require formal training in energy work or psychology and are often marketed toward male clients. While these experiences may offer stress relief or temporary emotional uplift, they lack the meditative and transformative depth found in spiritually-oriented tantric massage.

== Tantric massage as a spiritual practice ==
In contrast, tantric massage as a spiritual practice emphasizes meditative awareness, energetic transformation, and emotional release. Rooted in principles developed during the neotantric movement of the late 20th century, whose very beginnings were in the end of the 19th century, this form of bodywork is not designed to induce arousal or climax. Instead, it is a structured method for guiding vital energy—particularly sexual energy—through the body, often via the chakras. The practice seeks to balance feminine (Shakti) and masculine (Shiva) energies within the recipient, promoting psychophysical well-being.

Spiritual tantric massage is sometimes conducted by trained professionals, such as psychologists, sexologists, or somatic therapists, who understand the psychological and energetic dynamics involved. Techniques may include conscious touch, mouth breathing, and subtle body manipulations. Sensitive areas may be involved in the process (e.g., during yoni or lingam mapping, which is a sort of pelvic acupressure), but their inclusion serves purposes of emotional integration and trauma release—not pleasure. In this context, orgasm may occur but is never the intended goal. The primary focus is on deep relaxation, expanded consciousness, and spiritual insight. During spiritual tantric massage the person that receives the practice often cries with a positive sense of liberation. Several scientific studies have already documented promising therapeutic outcomes associated with this approach, particularly in the treatment of psychosomatic disorders, sexual dysfunction, and trauma-related conditions.

Multiple sources indicate that tantric massage is a modern development originating in Europe toward the end of the 20th century. While some accounts trace its emergence to the 1980s, others suggest it began as early as the 1960s. Despite drawing inspiration from traditional tantric philosophies, tantric massage itself is not an ancient practice and does not have roots extending back thousands of years.

A tantric massage client, or receiver, is not a giver. It is their responsibility to accept the massage and yield to the rediscovering of senses, feelings, and emotions. As people come to resolve issues related to relationships, self-esteem, and sexual life, the process is designed to combine a sense of well-being with deep relaxation.

Tantra massage is based on ideas taken from the work of Wilhelm Reich, Carl Jung, Carl Rogers and Alexander Lowen. Other sources of inspiration included the work of Mantak Chia, Joseph Kramer – who developed the "Lingam massage" (origin of the word Lingam is Sanskrit in which it means organ) and "Taoist Erotic Massage" – and Annie Sprinkle, who developed the "Yoni massage".

== See also ==
- Bodywork
