= Kate Bornstein =

American author, playwright, performance artist, and gender theorist

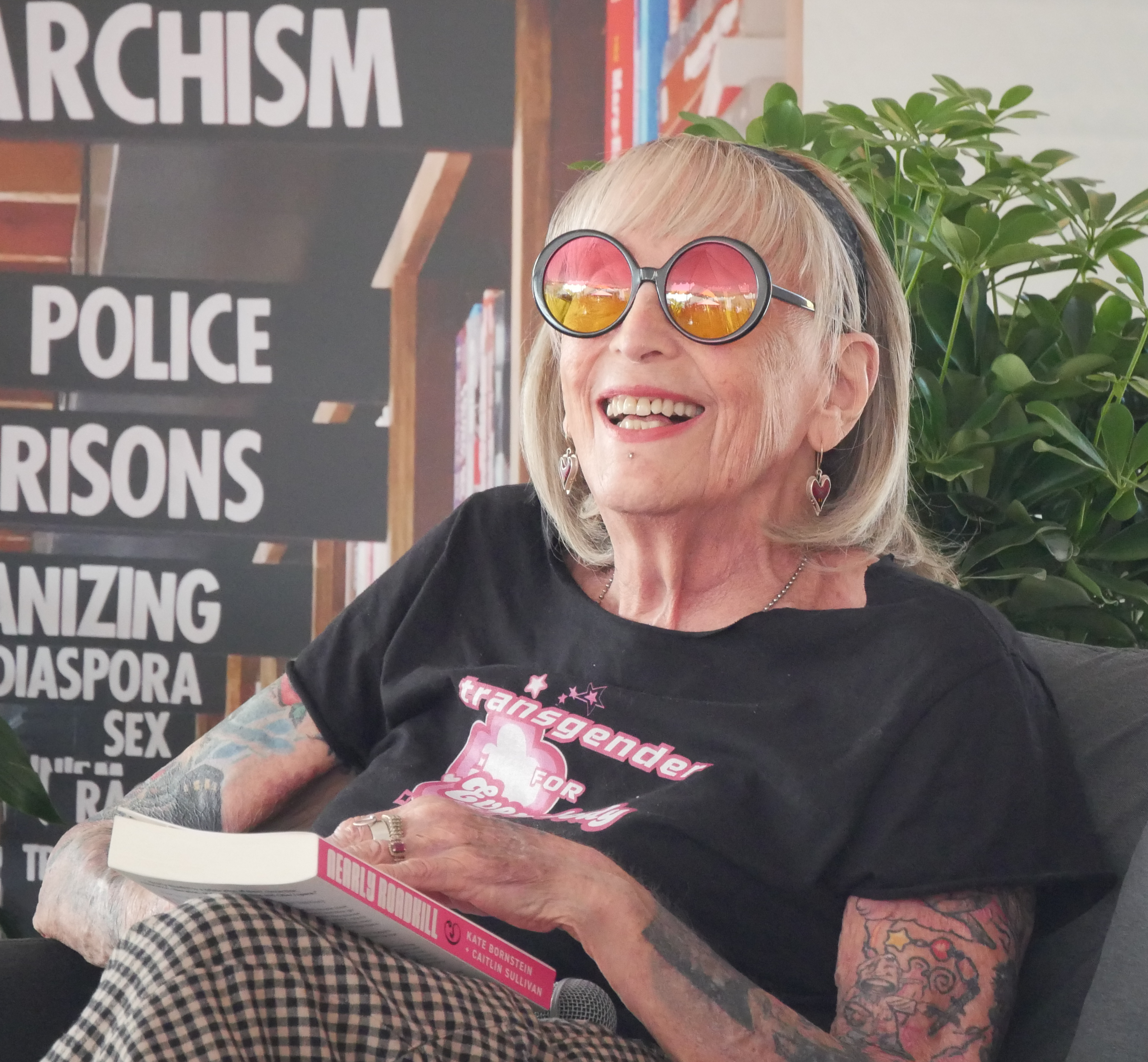
- Bornstein at the 2025 Baltimore Book Festival
- Born: March 15, 1948 (age 78); Neptune City, New Jersey, U.S.
- Education: Brown University (BA)
- Occupations: Performance artist; author
- Partner: Barbara Carrellas
- Website: katebornstein.com

Katherine Vandam Bornstein (born 15 March 1948) is an American author, playwright, performance artist, actor, and gender studies theorist. As a transgender pioneer since the 1980s, Bornstein's reflections on sex and gender nonconformity have influenced various spheres of queer culture. She (Note: Bornstein uses she/her and they/them pronouns; this article uses she/her for consistency.) has stated "I don't call myself a woman, and I know I'm not a man". Bornstein now identifies as non-binary, and has also written personal accounts of having anorexia, surviving PTSD, and being diagnosed with borderline personality disorder.

== Early life and education ==
Bornstein grew up just outside of Asbury Park, New Jersey, in an upper middle-class Conservative Jewish family of Russian and Dutch descent. Bornstein studied Theater Arts with John Emigh and Jim Barnhill at Brown University, graduating in 1969. She then attended Brandeis for graduate school in acting, but left when she joined the Church of Scientology.

== Scientology ==
Bornstein joined the Church of Scientology in 1970. She found herself drawn to Scientology because thetans are genderless beings. However, she recounted that during her time in the church, Scientologists claimed they could "cure [her] of what they described as an unhealthy obsession with wanting to be a woman", and they embodied homophobia and transphobia. She also stated that she believed Scientology was a way she could help "save the world", a mission many hippies at the time pursued. Bornstein eventually would serve on a ship with L. Ron Hubbard and eventually become a high-ranking lieutenant in the Sea Org. While serving in this position, she secretly bought porn magazines from Lee Brewster. She would also purchase women's clothes to wear while staying in hotels and later discard them. Bornstein later became disillusioned and formally left the movement in 1982. By doing so, she was deemed a suppressive person, which prevented her from contacting her daughter.

== Career ==
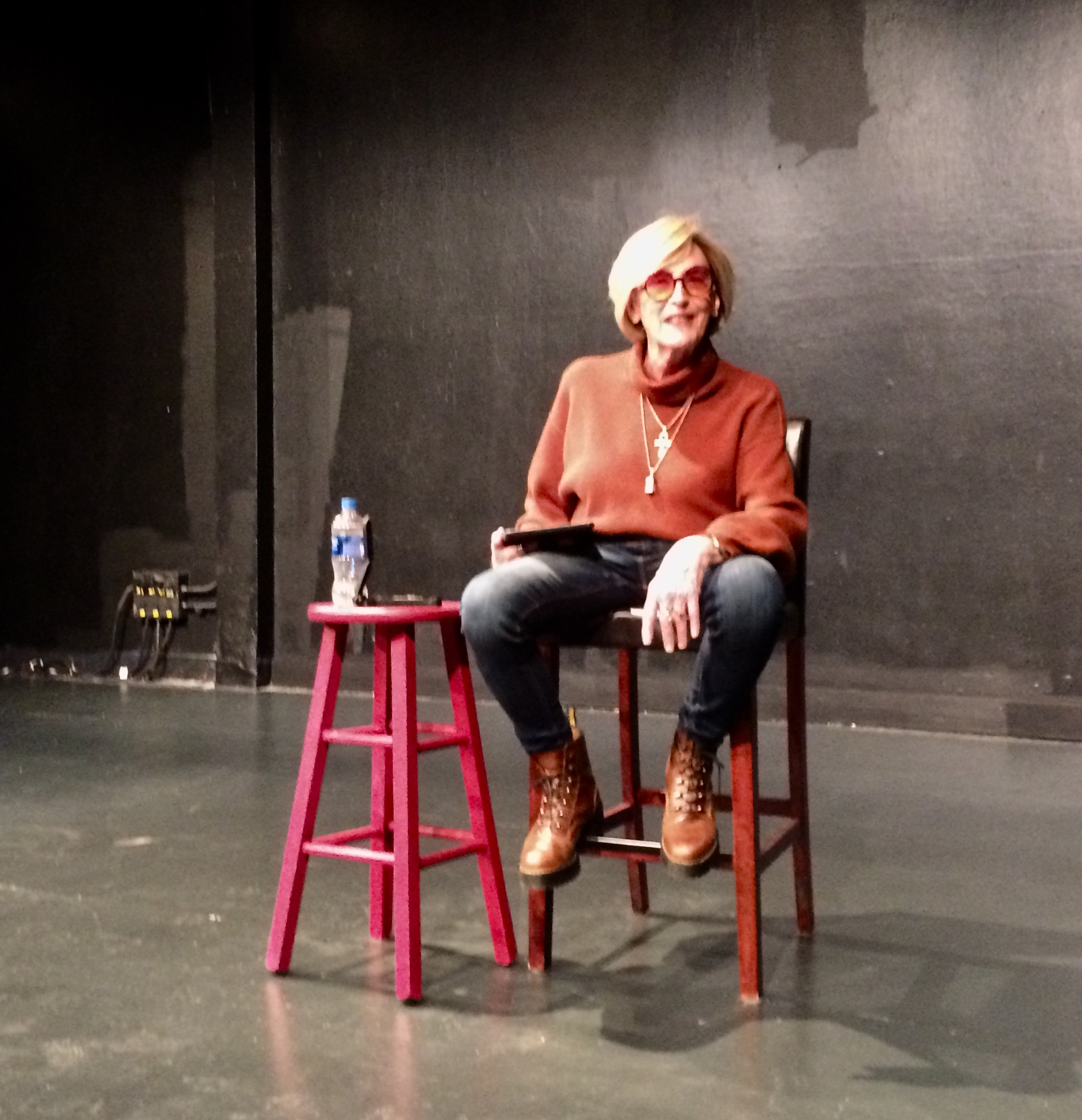
Bornstein at SUNY New Paltz in October 2018

Bornstein settled into the lesbian community in San Francisco, and wrote art reviews for the gay and lesbian paper The Bay Area Reporter. Over the next few years, she began to identify as neither a man nor a woman.

=== Theatre ===
While living in Philadelphia in the early 1980s, Bornstein co-founded Order Before Midnight, then labeled a women's theater company. After moving to San Francisco, she worked with Theatre Rhinoceros and Outlaw Productions. At a conference on women and theater in 1988, she performed a trio of monologues exploring gender via roles she had performed throughout her career. In 1989, she joined her first San Francisco show, playing the Judge in The Balcony, produced by Theatre Rhinoceros.

In 1989, Bornstein created a theatre production in collaboration with Noreen Barnes, Hidden: A Gender, based on parallels between their own life and that of the intersex person Herculine Barbin. Bornstein studied Barbin's memoirs, which were edited by Michel Foucault, in shaping the play. She originally envisioned it as a single-person performance of multiple characters, but it expanded to include three roles, with Bornstein as Doc Grinder, a narrator and foil, Justin Vivian Bond playing Barbin, and Sydney Erskine playing Herman/Kate Amberstone. They first performed in San Francisco before performing at a festival in Seattle and going on tour.

In the 1990s, Bornstein wrote and starred in solo performances focused on gender and her own trans identity: The Opposite Sex Is Neither, and Virtually Yours. Her next two works remained focused on identity, as well as community and the concept of sanity. In 1998, she wrote Strangers in Paradox, whose subject was the medicalization of trans people that cast them as mentally ill and dangerous, a perspective that held for centuries in Western medicine. She and her partner Barbara Carrellas also developed Too Tall Blondes in Love, which then toured nationally during the 2000s. Other single-person performances Bornstein created include Hard Candy and y2kate: gender virus 2000, which involved monologues, slam poetry, and lecture.

Bornstein made her Broadway debut in July 2018 in the play Straight White Men. She has since created several performance pieces, some of them one-person shows.

=== Writing ===
==== Gender Outlaw ====
Bornstein published Gender Outlaw: On Men, Women, and the Rest of Us in 1994. With a range of evidence and writing modes, they argue that gender is a cultural construct, not an inherent and rigid binary. The book contains theory and autobiography, as well as performance excerpts, personal photos, interviews, and exercises for the reader. Kirkus Reviews gave the book a positive review for its charismatic tone and incisive questioning of the predominant gender ideology of the time. The Lesbian Review of Books praised it as a "'must-read' for anyone, inside or outside the academy, who has ever been baffled by the workings of our sex/gender system". It has been critiqued for its lack of examination of race and class: the book does not interrogate how they affect Bornstein's experiences or explore the theory of their intersection with gender in forming oppressive hierarchies.

Gender Outlaw has become part of the queer studies canon. It was an influential work in building visibility and inclusivity for trans and non-binary people in the U.S., along with other 1990s works like Ann Fausto-Sterling's Myths of Gender, Leslie Feinberg's Transgender Warriors, and Bornstein's later My Gender Workbook. Bornstein gave talks at college campuses for two decades following the publication of Gender Outlaw, speaking on the same topics under that name.

==== My Gender Workbook ====
My Gender Workbook, first released in 1997, was designed to help readers "go on a little journey [...] through previously unexplored and underexplored areas of gender, identity, sexuality, and power". The book is focused on gender-bending exercises, but also contains comics, the play Post Hard: An Online Play in One Act, autobiographical elements from Bornstein, and writing from over 300 people. On the book's inside cover, the book begins with a fill-in the blank: "My Name is ____ and this is MY Gender Workbook".

Along with Bornstein's Gender Outlaw, this book helped build visibility and inclusion of trans and non-binary voices in U.S. media. Publishers Weekly stated it was "a classic of modern transgender theory and literature and, alongside Bornstein's other work, has influenced an entire generation of trans writers and artists". In 2013, Bornstein released an updated workbook titled My New Gender Workbook, which has new content and expanded sections on sexuality and intersectionality. Publishers Weekly gave the revised edition a starred review.

==== Nearly Roadkill ====
In 1996, Bornstein and Caitlin Sullivan published the speculative fiction novel Nearly Roadkill: An Infobahn Erotic Adventure. It is a cyberpunk romance, covering themes of surveillance, targeted advertising, cybersex, online identities, the gender binary, gender expression, trans exclusion and feminism. Bogi Takács, writing for Reactor, claims this may be the first speculative fiction novel with a trans author and trans characters. Nearly Roadkill is also notable for being one of the earliest publications to use the neopronouns "ze/hir" to describe one of its characters, which helped popularize the use of gender-neutral pronouns.

Bornstein and Sullivan had met at a queer writer's conference and began exchanging letters, eventually switching to email and chat rooms. Bornstein recounted later that the freedom of expressing themself over text online enabled them to "be as outrageously queer" as they wanted and not disabled or filtered. Both authors' experiences online inspired the book, which they wrote by sending individual chapters to each other. In a similar manner, the book is an epistolary novel, taking the form of emails and chat logs.

As the internet was relatively unknown, many of the technologies they used in the book had to be extensively explained. Bornstein and Sullivan also explained gender "ad nauseum". The book was edited and re-released in September 2025 as The Nearly Roadkill Reboot under the title Nearly Roadkill: Queer Love on the Run, in which explanations are simplified for more familiar audiences and the story's framing is changed to center the setting in the 1990's for current times.

==== Hello, Cruel World ====
Bornstein published Hello, Cruel World: 101 Alternatives to Suicide for Teens, Freaks, and Other Outlaws in 2006. She wrote the book informed by her own experiences with suicidal ideation. It was meant as a practical guide for teenagers, providing over 100 options for readers to "choose life over death". Examples include calling a suicide hotline and rescuing animals. Some alternatives are provided with caveats about their risks, like using drugs. Bornstein had begun writing the book after she had fallen into depression after witnessing the September 11 attacks and being unsatisfied with the, in her opinion, unhelpful and harmful advice in the available suicide prevention books. The book was partially inspired by 1001 Ways to Live Without Working by Tuli Kupferberg (1961). Hello, Cruel World was a Lambda Literary Award Finalist for LGBT Nonfiction and Honor book for Stonewall Children's and Young Adult Literature.

In April 2025, the book was republished with 20 additional alternatives as Hello, Cruel World: 101+ Alternatives to Suicide for Teens, Freaks, and Other Outlaws: Second Edition. The re-release was motivated by rising hostility towards the trans community and disagreements in the LGBT community.

==== Gender Outlaws ====
Bornstein edited Gender Outlaws: The Next Generation in collaboration with S. Bear Bergman. The book builds on Gender Outlaw, with five parts exploring transgender themes. It incorporates essays, comics, and poems, on tragic and funny subjects, and explores the advantages and disadvantages of gender nonconformity and transgender identity. There are around 50 writers included in the collection, and Bornstein said she was very proud of how each shared and welcomed each other's varying worldviews on gender and sexuality, identifying in ways Bornstein "never dreamed of" when she first wrote Gender Outlaw.

Gender Outlaws received a positive review from The Gay & Lesbian Review. The work won the Lambda Literary Award for LGBT Anthology and was a finalist in the Transgender Nonfiction category. It also won a Special Nonfiction Publishing Triangle Award in 2011.

==== A Queer and Pleasant Danger ====
In 2012 Bornstein published their memoir, A Queer and Pleasant Danger: The True Story of a Nice Jewish Boy Who Joins the Church of Scientology and Leaves Twelve Years Later to Become the Lovely Lady She Is Today. The book describes Bornstein's childhood; experience with Scientology; then recovery and therapy; negotiation of sexuality and gender; and S&M experiences. This would be her first public account of some of these experiences, especially in discussing Scientology. Bornstein stated that they were too scared to talk about Scientology, which had a reputation for legal retaliation against people who speak critically of the church, until seeing enough people talk publicly following South Park's episode on Scientology. They described their eventual motivation in speaking up within the memoir as an attempt to reconnect with their daughter, who was still a Scientologist.

=== Later work ===
In 2014, Bornstein was the subject of Sam Feder's documentary, Kate Bornstein is a Queer and Pleasant Danger, which was shown at film festivals. Bornstein was featured in the reality television series I Am Cait.

== Reception ==
Bornstein is a major cultural icon, influencing the social and political representation of transgender identity. Aperture referred to her as a "gender outlaw" and Salon.com labeled her a "legendary pioneer in gender theory". She has been a prominent voice on gender for decades, speaking across art forms and on talk shows, working to break apart myths about trans people and show audiences possibilities outside the gender binary. Scholar Madelyn Detloff credits Bornstein's work with translating complex topics in queer theory to share them with larger mainstream audiences, and doing it in a way that can transform the rules and roles that had seemed to bind her audience.

Some of Bornstein's perspectives have elicited controversy. This has been a reaction to many of her books upon publication, although later opinion shifted, labeling them as trailblazing. From some in the trans community, she has been protested and labeled transphobic. One attitude condemned her refusal to identify inside the gender binary. Another criticized her comments about the permissibility of private women's spaces that exclude trans women, which she apologized for when called out by Riki Wilchins. Bornstein amended this perspective to call for a respectful dialogue on the topic of lesbian separatist exclusion of trans women, which Emi Koyama critiqued as a philosophy that hurts marginalized women for the sake of the privileged, one that reinforces the culture "in which white middle-class women's oppression against women of color and working class women are trivialized or tolerated".

== Personal life ==
Before joining Scientology, Bornstein explored Essene asceticism and faiths other than the Judaism of their childhood, including the Amish church, the Baháʼí Faith, Zen Buddhism and pagan witchcraft. Bornstein married and had a child while a Scientologist.

Bornstein never felt comfortable with the belief of the day that all trans women are "women trapped in men's bodies". She recounted in 2018 that after she left Scientology, she "came to terms with what I had been living with all my life: that I am not a man". At that time, many gender identities and gender-related terms, including non-binary, had not reached cultural consciousness. The only three roles Bornstein was aware of were "drag queen", "cross-dresser", and "transsexual", and the doctors she spoke to stated that her two choices for gender identification were man or woman. She did not identify as a man, but the only other option was to be a woman, a reflection of the gender binary, which required people to identify according to only two available genders.

Bornstein also recounted how sexuality and gender were linked in the minds of the medical establishment at the time, with heterosexuality assumed. She underwent gender-affirming surgery in 1986 and was denied care twice because "in order to qualify for surgery I had to say I was attracted to men, that I wanted to get married and that my regret was that I’d never be able to give birth".

Bornstein described the 1980s, a period when she came out and began her writing career, as a very lonely period, where she built her community with performance artists like Holly Hughes rather than the gay and lesbian community. She was also dealing with her experiences in Scientology: after she left, she was diagnosed with PTSD and had night terrors for over 15 years. As Bornstein transitioned, they looked to role models like Tula, who published the 1982 book I am a Woman, and Wendy Carlos, the first trans person to graduate from Brown University. Bornstein also saw Christine Jorgensen and Renée Richards in the media, but felt less connection to them. Bornstein later took inspiration from Lou Sullivan, who was one of the first trans men to come out as gay: both lived in San Francisco's Mission District and spoke about sexuality and gender.

Annie Sprinkle introduced Bornstein and her longtime partner, Barbara Carrellas, at a show in San Francisco in 1997. As of 2012, Bornstein lived with Carrellas in New York City, with three cats, two dogs, and a turtle. In August 2012, Bornstein was diagnosed with lung cancer. She had surgery which initially seemed successful, but in February 2013 it was found that the disease had returned. Laura Vogel, a friend of Bornstein's, launched a GoFundMe campaign on March 20 to help fund subsequent treatment. In December 2015, Bornstein announced that they had been cancer-free for two years.

In a 2018 interview, Bornstein described themself as a "non-binary femme-identified trans person". She stated that "[her] expression, [her] great joy, is walking through the world like a little old lady". At the time, Bornstein described herself as having a non-binary identity and feminine gender expression. Speaking to the LGBTQ&A podcast in July 2021, Bornstein talked about how her view of gender evolved during the COVID-19 pandemic, "Gender became inconsequential to me while I was in quarantine and grappling with old age...This is where you really need to be letting go of shit. I'm letting go of the ability to be cute, in certain ways. I'm too old for that. My face is sagging, my boobs are sagging. Boy, oh boy. They're down to my waist and you let go of that as being necessary to your gender."

In 2024, after Bornstein began theorizing about gender in four dimensions, she explained her gender as a continuum with different identities at different points along spacetime. She explained: "I don't have a gender identity anymore, but I do have a favored gender expression. Girl is fun for me, girl is great. Girl doesn't quite work when you're 76 years old, though. If I were to name a gender that I enjoy these days, it would be little old lady."

== Books ==
- Bornstein, Kate (1994). Gender Outlaw: On Men, Women, and the Rest of Us. New York City: Routledge. ISBN 978-0679757016.
- Sullivan, Caitlin; Bornstein, Kate (1996). Nearly Roadkill: An Infobahn Erotic Adventure. New York City: High Risk Books. ISBN 978-1852424183.
- Bornstein, Kate (1998). My Gender Workbook: How to Become a Real Man, a Real Woman, the Real You, or Something Else Entirely. Illustrations by Diane DiMassa. New York City: Routledge. ISBN 978-0415916721. — winner of a 1999 Firecracker Alternative Book Award
- Bornstein, Kate (2006). Hello, Cruel World: 101 Alternatives to Suicide for Teens, Freaks, and Other Outlaws. New York: Seven Stories Press. ISBN 9781583227206.
- Bornstein, Kate; Bergman, S. Bear, eds. (2010). Gender Outlaws: The Next Generation. Berkeley, California: Seal Press. ISBN 9781580053082.
- Bornstein, Kate (2012). A Queer and Pleasant Danger: A Memoir. Beacon Press. ISBN 9780807001653. OL 25139467M.
- Bornstein, Kate (2013). My New Gender Workbook: A Step-by-Step Guide to Achieving World Peace Through Gender Anarchy and Sex Positivity. New York: Routledge. ISBN 978-0415538657.
- Bornstein, Kate (2016). Gender Outlaw: On Men, Women, and the Rest of Us (Revised and Updated). New York: Vintage Books, a division of Penguin Random House LLC. ISBN 978-1-101-97461-2.
- Bornstein, Kate (2025). Hello, Cruel World: 101+ Alternatives to Suicide for Teens, Freaks, and Other Outlaws: Second Edition. New York: Triangle Square Books for Young Readers. ISBN 9781644214435.
- Bornstein, Kate; Sullivan, Caitlin (2025). Nearly Roadkill: Queer Love on the Run. New York: Generous Press, an imprint of Simon & Schuster. ISBN 9798991642859.
