= Kramer Electronics =

Israel-based manufacturing company

- Native name: קרמר אלקטרוניקה בע"מ
- Company type: Private limited company
- Industry: Audiovisual
- Founded: 1981; 45 years ago in Israel
- Founder: Joseph Kramer
- Headquarters: Tel Aviv, Israel
- Number of locations: 20
- Area served: Europe; Middle East; East Asia; Southeast Asia; Oceania; North America
- Key people: Gilad Yron (CEO)
- Products: Presentation technology; Streaming media; Video walls; Ethernet extenders; HDMI tools; Video routers
- Revenue: US$200 million (2021)
- Number of employees: 700 (2021)
- Parent: Fortissimo Capital
- Website: kramerav.com

Kramer Electronics is an Information and communications technology company that designs, manufactures and distributes network-based devices and networking cables for professional video over IP and audio over IP. Products are commonly used for Video Conferencing, Education Technology and Closed-circuit television. Customers' include commercial enterprises and institutions such as universities, courts and local authorities. Kramer devices facilitate online control and enable hybrid (mixed local and remote) and BYOD (bring your own device) use cases. Kramer were wholly owned and managed by founder Joseph Kramer until 2021, when they were bought by the Israeli private equity fund Fortissimo Capital.

== History ==
Kramer Electronics was founded in 1981 by Joseph Kramer, who has a PhD in pharmaceutical biology and was working in research and development at a company that manufactured headphones. His employer went out of business and Kramer foresaw the significance of video, then in its infancy, and used his previous employer's distribution channels to start selling video products of his own design.

=== Acquisition of Sierra Video ===
In 2003, Kramer Electronics bought Sierra Video, a company that manufactures Broadcast Routing equipment which expanded the Kramer product offering into large format routing products for composite video, RGBHV video and SDI and HD-SDI signals as well as audio signals.

=== Acquisition of UC Workspace ===
In February 2022, it was announced Kramer has acquired the hybrid collaboration meeting room application provider, UC Workspace.
