= Aderonke Apata =

Nigerian LGBTQ activist and asylum seeker (born 1967)

- Born: 20 January 1967 (age 59); Nigeria
- Occupation: African Rainbow Family Charity CEO
- Known for: LGBT activism, former asylum seeker
- Awards: LGBT Positive Role Model Award, Activist of the Year from the 24th Sexual Freedom Awards

Aderonke Apata (born 20 January 1967) is a Nigerian LGBTQ activist, former asylum seeker and barrister. She received widespread media attention due to her asylum case in the United Kingdom. Apata is the founder of the African Rainbow Family, an LGBTQ charity.

== Biography ==
Aderonke Apata was born on 20 January 1967 in Nigeria. Apata first became aware that she was lesbian at the age of 16. Due to Apata's family suspecting she was a lesbian as well as due to Apata's husband's family suspecting her of being a lesbian and having an affair, she was arrested after police found her engaging in homosexual acts in her apartment and was taken to a sharia court, where Apata was sentenced to death by stoning for adultery and witchcraft. However, the sentence was stopped when a person acting as counsel raised a legal technicality. Before being taken to court, she was sent to a prison where she was placed in an open jail cell with other inmates.

Apata fled Nigeria to London, United Kingdom where she first claimed asylum on religious grounds in 2004 due to her coming from a Christian family, but having married a Muslim man in a sham arrangement in an attempt to cover up her long-term relationship with another woman. After her two initial appeals for asylum were rejected, she was forced to live on the streets in Manchester to avoid deportation. In October 2012, she spent a week in solitary confinement at Yarl's Wood Immigration Removal Centre as punishment for leading a peaceful demonstration at the centre. During this time, she says she received poor legal advice, so decided to research immigration law herself.

In 2012, after Apata was caught working as a care manager with a fake visa, she again tried to apply for asylum, fearing returning to Nigeria and being persecuted for her sexuality. This asylum claim and another asylum claim were rejected in 2014 and on 1 April 2015 respectively because the Home Office (HO), a UK ministerial department, did not believe she was a lesbian due to her previously being in a relationship with a man and having children with that man. In 2014, Apata said that she would send an explicit video of herself to the Home Office to prove her sexuality. This resulted in her asylum bid gaining widespread support, with multiple petitions created in response, which gained hundreds of thousands of signatures combined. Later, she also came close to being deported back to Nigeria, but was told on her drive to the airport that her flight to Nigeria had been cancelled.

On 8 August 2017, after a thirteen-year legal battle (during which she partly represented herself in court) and after a new appeal from Apata was scheduled for late July, she was granted refugee status in the United Kingdom by the Home Office. The asylum permit Apata had been given would only last for five years, but she would be able to apply for permanent residence in the UK afterwards.

In 2018, Apata started her formal legal training with a law conversion course. On 13 October 2022, Apata was called to the bar.

== Personal life ==
In Nigeria, Apata had a girlfriend after graduating and they lived together in an apartment.

In 2005, Apata was diagnosed with Post-traumatic stress disorder (PTSD) and attempted to commit suicide when she was in prison facing deportation. In 2012, Apata's former female partner was killed in a vigilante incident. Apata's brother and three-year-old son were also killed in vigilante incidents.

As of 2015, Apata was engaged to Happiness Agboro, who had previously been granted refugee status in the United Kingdom based on her sexuality. As of 2017, Apata resides in the UK.

== Awards and honours ==
- LGBT Positive Role Model Award from the 3rd National Diversity Awards (2014)
- Activist of the Year from the 24th Sexual Freedom Awards (2018)
