= Dan Glass (activist) =

British queer activist & author

- Born: 1980s London
- Occupations: Queer activist & author
- Years active: 2000s - now
- Known for: LGBTQ+ activism, HIV/AIDS advocacy, queer public history, and direct action activism
- Website: https://www.theglassishalffull.co.uk/

Dan Glass is a British healthcare and human rights activist, author and community organiser.

Glass is the founder of Queer Tours of London, author of United Queerdom: From the Legends of the Gay Liberation Front to the Queers of Tomorrow and Queer Footprints - A Guide to Uncovering London’s Fierce History. He gained attention for a 2008 stunt in which he superglued himself to Gordon Brown, Prime Minister of Britain.

Alongside ACT UP London's archive, his own campaigning archive can be found at the Bishopsgate Institute in London.

== Early life and education ==
Glass was raised in London with grandparents who survived the Holocaust. Glass is gay and lives with HIV. He has cited the influence of the Pink Triangle from the Nazi Holocaust used to identify homosexuals and the "Silence = Death" slogan.

== Literary career ==
Glass' debut book United Queerdom: From the Legends of the Gay Liberation Front to the Queers of Tomorrow was published in 2020. The book blends autobiography, movement history, theory and cultural critique. Themes in United Queerdom include history, critiques of assimilation and commercialisation in mainstream Pride culture, anecdotes and reflections on Glass' own life, and the role of protest.

In May 2023, Pluto Press published Queer Footprints: A Guide to Uncovering London’s Fierce History. In collaboration with artist Mark Glasgow, the book is a narrative guide to London's queer history utilising walking routes and storytelling.

== Activism and campaigns ==
Glass' activism has included campaigns to protect LGBTQ+ spaces and climate activism, including where he "glued himself to the UK prime minister." Glass organised an anti-UKIP cabaret protests and critiques of far-right politics. He has also been outspoken about commercialisation of Pride and intersectional activism.

Amnesty International UK describes Glass' activism as a revival of the queer community's fight against stigma and exclusion.

== Recognition ==
- Lifetime Achievement Award from The Rainbow Tree
- Named BBC Greater Londoner for founding Queer Tours of London
- Recognised as one of Attitude magazine’s “campaigning role models for LGBTQI youth
- Listed by The Guardian as a "UK youth climate leader"
- Won 2017 Activist of the Year at the Sexual Freedom Awards
