= Barbara Carrellas =

American author and sex educator

- Occupation: Sex educator
- Known for: Tantric sex workshops and education
- Partner: Kate Bornstein
- Website: BarbaraCarrellas.com

Barbara Carrellas is an author, sex educator, performance artist, and certified sexologist accredited through the American College of Sexologists. She facilitates workshops in which participants explore sexuality through a holistic approach that includes practices like erotic breathwork and Tantra, and she has lectured at various institutions, including the Museum of Sex in New York City, Vassar College, Barnard College, and the Chicago Art Institute. She is known for her "breath and energy orgasm" techniques, which she says are "orgasms you can have using your imagination and your breath". Carrellas learned the technique during the height of the AIDS epidemic as a way for people to orgasm without physical contact. Such techniques, she says, offers a way for "people to have more safer-sex options".

Carrellas spent five years in the 1990s living in Australia but currently resides in New York City and lives with her partner, Kate Bornstein. In 2010, she appeared on the Canadian television show Sex Matters, and in the TLC show Strange Sex.

In November 2016, Carrellas was given an honorary Lifetime Achievement Award at the London-based Sexual Freedom Awards for her contributions to the field of sexuality spanning several decades.

== Influences and techniques ==
During the late 1980s, Barbara Carrellas began teaching Sacred Sex workshops with Annie Sprinkle and Linda Montano. Carrellas says that tantra can be a bridge between different sexual practices, and she calls this "neo-tantra". She has specifically developed her brand of sacred sex in order to make tantra accessible to people who "felt left out" of such sexuality, such as transsexual and transgender individuals. In 2017, she collaborated with sex educator Joseph Kramer to create the film Transcendent Bodies—The Erotic Awakening Massage for Trans and Gender Non-Conforming Bodies. She has regularly worked with the LGBTQ and BDSM community. She maintains that breathing and being vocal are key to enjoying sex, and that many people are culturally discouraged from doing this as they are first learning to be sexual.

== Books ==
- Luxurious Loving: Tantric Inspirations for Passion and Pleasure, 2006, ISBN 1-59233-237-4
- Urban Tantra: Sacred Sex for the Twenty-First Century, 2007, ISBN 1-58761-290-9
- Urban Tantra Essentials: A Bedside Guide to Erotic Massage, Conscious Breath, and Sacred Sex, 2011, ISBN 1-58761-071-X
- Ecstasy is Necessary: A Practical Guide, 2012, ISBN 1-4019-2847-1

== See also ==
- Sex magic
