= Lingam massage =

Massage technique of male genitalia

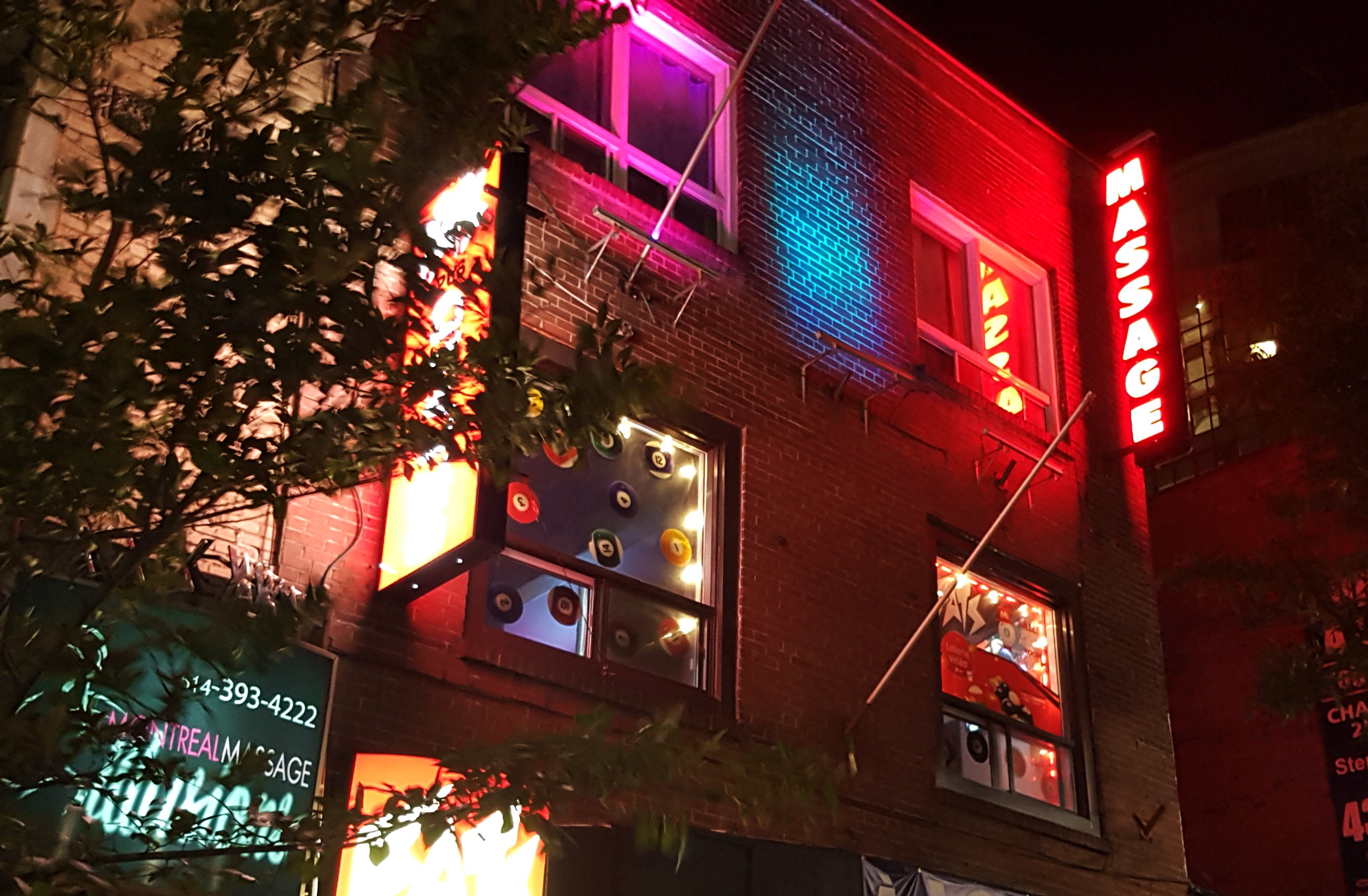
A massage parlor in Montreal, Canada

A lingam massage (Sanskrit: लिङ्ग, phallus) is a type of tantric massage that primarily focuses on the male genitalia. It is the male equivalent of a Yoni massage. Although sexual in nature, the goal of the massage is not to experience an orgasm. According to Tara Suwinyattichaiporn, M.D., the aim of the massage is "...arousal and the connection between two people while focusing on erogenous zones." Massage oils are frequently used in order to reduce friction and increase sensation. Lingam massage may also allow the recipient to experience multiple orgasms.

== Practice ==
After creating the appropriate ambiance, massage oil is put on the masseur's or masseuse's hands. The massage begins with massage focused on the areas surrounding the penis, such as the lower abdomen, upper and inner thighs. The hands are moved slowly across the skin. Then, the testicles or the perineum are massaged. Finally, beginning with the bottom of the shaft, and ending at the head, the penis is massaged as well. Following this, the prostate may be massaged as well. In order for the orgasm to be more long-lasting and intense, a high level of sexual arousal is maintained for some time, before allowing the receiver to ejaculate.
