= Linda Montano =

American artist (born 1942)

- Born: Linda Mary Montano; January 18, 1942 (age 84); Saugerties, New York
- Education: College of New Rochelle; Maryknoll Sisters (novice); University of Wisconsin (sculpture)
- Known for: Performance art
- Awards: ARTIES Award, 1st Annual Performance Art Award, Franklin Furnace (1986); Susan B. Anthony Award, Window for Peace (February 1988); Bessie Award for Innovative Artists (Seven Years of Living Art, 1992); Best Performance Artist (Chronogram, 2000)

Linda Mary Montano (born January 18, 1942) is an American performance artist.

== Early life ==
Born in Saugerties, New York, Montano was raised in a devoutly Roman Catholic household, partly Irish and partly Italian, surrounded by artistic activity. Both her parents played in an orchestra. Linda's fascination with Catholic ritual and desire to do humanitarian service led her to join the novitiate of the Maryknoll Sisters after one year studying at the College of New Rochelle. After two years with the order, however, Montano was suffering from severe anorexia, and she left to return to her former college, from which she graduated in 1965 as a sculptor.

== Work ==
=== Performance art ===
During the rest of the 1960s, Montano continued to study and began performing, and by 1971, she was devoting herself exclusively to performance art. Around this time she married the photographer Mitchell Payne. During this period, Montano drifted away from the Catholic Church. But despite this loss of faith, she consistently acknowledged the influence of her strict Catholic upbringing on her work: for instance, in how the discipline of convent life and her family's loyal work ethic made her able to carry out extremely disciplined performances in her later career. Montano's first major performance, Chicken Woman (1972), was based on her MFA sculpture show at the University of Wisconsin, Madison. There, she exhibited nine live chickens in three 8-foot (2.4 m) by 16-foot-long (4.9 m) minimalist chicken wire cages on the roof of the art building. It was titled "The Chicken Show" from 1969.

Montano moved to San Francisco in 1970 with her husband, Mitchell Payne. There, she established herself with performances like "Handcuff" (1973 with Tom Marioni), where she was physically tied to other artists, and "Three Day Blindfold" (1974), where she lived for three days blindfolded and had to find her way around. The accidental death of her by-then-ex-husband by gunshot wound led to further exploration of art as a healing modality. In her video/performance "Mitchell's Death" (1977), Montano outlines the story: receiving the call, remembering their relationship, waves of care provided by her romantic partner, composer and musician Pauline Oliveros, deciding to attend the funeral. Montano, face covered in acupuncture needles, intones the events in a monk-like drone. Of this decision to sing, Montano would later ask, "Don't singing words go to a more sensitive part of the brain than do spoken words?"

She continued her art-theology dialogue by living in a Zen monastery for three years and to Ananda Ashram in the 1980s where she studied with Dr. Ramamurti Mishra for over 30 years. His influence and appreciation of her vision encouraged both her art and life. Upon meeting Taiwanese performance artist Tehching Hsieh, they performed a collaboration whereby the two artists were bound to each other by a length of rope 24 hours a day for a whole year (from July 4, 1983, to July 3, 1984). During the late 1980s Montano began teaching Sacred Sex workshops with Annie Sprinkle and Barbara Carrellas with whom she also created MetamorphoSex (later changed to The Art of Love at Montano's suggestion), a "workshop, sex magic ritual and theatre performance rolled into one" which was first performed in Texas in 1995.

=== Seven Years of Living Art ===
Montano's work investigates the relationship between art and life through intricate, life-altering ceremonies, some of which last for seven or more years. She is interested in the way artistic ritual, often staged as individual interactions or collaborative workshops, can be used to alter and enhance a person's life and to create the opportunity for focus on spiritual energy states, silence and the cessation of art/life boundaries.

From 1984 onwards, Montano did another ambitious project titled "Seven Years of Living Art", in which she lived in her home in Kingston wearing strictly monochromatic clothing, spent a portion of every day in a coloured room, and listened to a designated tone, all of which corresponded to the energetic qualities of a specific chakra. She changed color every year, and after the project was finished followed it up with "Another Seven Years of Living Art", in part to memorialise her mother, Mildred Montano, who died in 1988 of colon cancer. This time, she did not use the colors, but aimed to focus on the same chakras. From 1998, Montano has given cycles to other artists: MIchelle Bush, Barbara Carrellas, SC Durkin, Koosil-Ja Hwang, Vernita N'Cognita, Esther K. Smith, Krista Kelly Walsh, with satellite projects by Victoria Singh & Kurtis Champion, Steven Reigns and Elizabeth Stephens & Annie Sprinkle hoping to give three cycles to three artists, each dating up to 2019. After this, Montano focused upon freelance teaching of performance art, caring for her increasingly ill father, Henry, and counseling people again practicing "Art/Life Counseling", a technique she used for seven years at The New Museum where curator Marcia Tucker had built a private room and allowed Montano to counsel people once a month in the window installation which was painted the same color that Montano wore for that year. At that time (1984–1991), Montano used tarot, palm and psychic readings as tools of discovery, as well as attentive listening so that she could respond to the questions of her clients with the intention of finding the most creative ways to respond to their problems and difficulties. (Montano still practices "Art/Life/Laugher Counseling" but without the assistance of tarot, palm, or psychic readings which are forbidden by her current practice of Catholicism).

=== The Art/Life Institute ===
Founded by Montano herself, the Art/Life Institute offers residency to aspiring performance artists in Kingston for Performance Artists, where Montano worked on and performed her works. She also wrote The Art/Life Institute Handbook, which included performance exercises that drew from her own work as well as that of others. The handbook was intended to make performance art a tool accessible to anyone. Montano's work has questioned the boundaries between life and art, and the institute and the artist's other Art/Life counseling perpetrated the dissolution of these boundaries by attempting to bring performance to all people and all aspects of life. For those not able to complete a residency at the institute, Montano even has a "Virtual Residency" available online with tasks that similarly designed to make performance more natural and accessible to anyone.

=== Return to Catholicism ===
The influence of her father led Montano to return to Catholicism and ultimately to church attendance. Since 2005, she has gathered and taken prayer requests to more than ten Catholic pilgrimage sites throughout the world. Montano also meets with others in Catholic churches for 3-hour silent retreats, re-seeing the concept of endurance from new Catholic eyes. Since returning, Montano has made numerous videos exploring the faith, including Father Lebar: Catholic Priest and Exorcist; Saint Teresa Of Avila By Linda Mary Montano, and currently Mother Teresa of Calcutta. She also performs three-hour endurances, lip-syncing as Paul McMahon and Bob Dylan.

Montano donated her archive to the Fales Library and Special Collections at NYU in 2013.

In 2016, Montano created Dad Art Performance/Healing Collage, which she described as "an opportunity for a willing community to see, learn about, interact with and experience aesthetically/performatively the old age, sickness and death of my father Henry Joseph Montano as life/art."

"Dad Art, An Interactive Performance about Life and Death and Love" was presented by Defibrillator Gallery at Zhou B Art Center, 1029 W 35th St., Chicago, IL 60609 on November 11, 2018. A number of local artists and the audience collaborated on the 3-hour performance piece, which was dedicated to Pauline Oliveros.

== Other ==
In 1975, Montano met Pauline Oliveros, who eventually became her romantic partner. The titles of Oliveros' pieces Rose Moon and Rose Mountain refer to Montano having gone by Rose Mountain at one time.

== Videography ==
- Characters: Learning to Talk (1978) 45 min
- Mitchell's Death (1978) 22 min
- Primal Scenes (1980) 11 min
- Anorexia Nervosa (1981) 60 min
- On Death and Dying (1982) 22 min
- Sharada, Wife of Ramakrishna (with Andy Cockrum and Chris Erlon) (1995) 23 min
- Seven Spiritual Lives of Linda M. Montano (with Andy Cockrum and Chris Erlon) (1996) 13 min
- Seven Stages of Intoxication (with Andy Cockrum and Chris Erlon) (1996) 34 min
- Father Lebar: Catholic Priest and Excorcist (2008)
- Saint Teresa Of Avila By Linda Mary Montano
- Mother Teresa of Calcutta
