= Mathilde Madden =

Mathilde Madden, pen name of Mathilda Gregory, is a British erotica author and journalist at The Guardian. Her novel Equal Opportunities is about a female sadist who sexually dominates a man left using a wheelchair after an accident. Her other novels include Mad About the Boy, about women paying men for sex and Peep Show, about a female voyeur who likes to spy on gay men. On writing erotica, Madden says, "if you write erotica, you end up with your own tailor-made fun. My own work, because I’ve written it, touches every one of my hot buttons." She currently lives in Brighton and has two children.

Her novel The Silver Crown was subjected to legal scrutiny when Pelican Bay State Prison, California withheld a copy from an inmate convicted of attempted murder, Andres Martinez, on grounds that the book was "obscene and likely to incite violence" and contained "descriptions of explicit sexual conduct." In May 2013, an appeals court affirmed the prisoner's right to read the book.

== Works ==
Paranormal urban fantasy erotica novels:

- The Silver Collar (2007)
- The Silver Crown (2007)
- The Silver Cage (2008)

Erotica novels:

- Peep Show (2005)
- Mad About the Boy (2005)
- Equal Opportunities (2006; Erotic Award-winner)

Audio Plays:

- Doctor Who audio play Wet Walls for Short Trips - Volume 3 (2011)
