= Charles Muir =

American Tantra teacher

Charles Muir is a tantra teacher described as "one of the originators of the modern tantra movement" in the United States. His first book was Tantra: The Art of Conscious Loving (1989). He developed the "sacred spot massage" method.
