= Presentation technology =

Tools used for conveying information

Presentation technology consists of tools used to assist in conveying information during a presentation.

When a speaker is verbally addressing an audience, it is often necessary to use supplementary equipment and media to clarify the point. If the audience is large or the speaker is soft-spoken, a public address system may be employed.

At a basic level, visual content can be provided by drawing directly onto a blackboard or whiteboard during the presentation. At a more advanced level, flip charts, slide projectors, and overhead projectors can be used for displaying prepared content. The use of prepared material often results in a neater and more accessible presentation.

Laser pointers or sticks are often used to highlight a particular point of interest within a slide or image. Many manufacturers produce devices that provide remote control over electrical presentation equipment, thus allowing the speaker to move around the stage freely and to activate systems when they are required.

Occasionally still images do not provide enough information to convey the message clearly. For example, the presenter may attempt to describe a complex mechanical movement, in which case animation or video may provide the clearest method of delivery.

Software presentation programs combined with digital projectors are frequently used because they provide a visually pleasing presentation and combine multiple media into a single device.

Presentations are often used in the business world, where careful attention is paid to the design of the presentation.
