= Neotantra =

Western interpretation of Tantra

Neotantra, navatantra (Sanskrit: नव, nava 'new'), or tantric sexuality, is a Western new religious movement partially based on Eastern spiritual traditions of Tantra. It includes both New Age and other modern Western interpretations of traditional Hindu and Buddhist tantras with an emphasis on their sexual elements. Some of its proponents refer to ancient and traditional texts and principles, and many others use tantra as a catch-all phrase for sacred sexuality, and may incorporate unorthodox practices. In addition, not all of the elements of Indian tantric practices are used in neotantra, in particular the reliance on a guru.

As interest in Tantra has grown in the West, its perception has deviated from the Tantric traditions. It was seen as a "cult of ecstasy", combining sexuality and spirituality to change Western attitudes towards sex. Hence for many modern readers tantra is now synonymous with "spiritual sex" or "sacred sexuality", a belief that sex should be recognized as a sacred act capable of elevating its participants to a higher spiritual plane. As tantric practice became known in Western culture, which has escalated since the 1960s, it has become identified with its sexual methods in the West.

== Practitioners ==
Sir John George Woodroffe, also known by his pseudonym Arthur Avalon, was a British Orientalist whose work helped to unleash in the West a deep and wide interest in Hindu philosophy and Yogic practices. Alongside his judicial duties he studied Sanskrit and Hindu philosophy and was especially interested in Hindu Tantra. He translated some twenty original Sanskrit texts and published and lectured prolifically on Indian philosophy and a wide range of Yoga and Solo Tantra topics. Woodroffe's The Serpent Power – The Secrets of Tantric and Shaktic Yoga, is a source for many modern Western adaptations of Kundalini yoga practice. It is a philosophically sophisticated commentary on, and translation of, the Satcakra-nirupana ("Description of and Investigation into the Six Bodily Centres") of Purnananda (dated around AD 1550) and the Paduka-Pancaka ("Five-fold Footstool of the Guru"). The term "Serpent Power" refers to the kundalini, an energy said to be released within an individual by meditation techniques.

Pierre Bernard was a pioneering American yogi, scholar, occultist, philosopher, mystic, and businessman. He claimed to have traveled to Kashmir and Bengal before founding the Tantrik Order of America in 1905. He eventually expanded to a chain of tantric clinics in places such as Cleveland, Philadelphia, Chicago, and New York City. Bernard is widely credited with being the first American to introduce the philosophy and practices of yoga and tantra to the American people. Many teachers of this version of tantra believe that sex and sexual experiences are sacred acts, which are capable of elevating their participants to a higher spiritual plane. They often talk about raising Kundalini energy, worshiping the divine feminine and the divine masculine, activating the chakras.

Guru Bhagwan Shree Rajneesh, later known as Osho, used his version of tantra in combination with breathing techniques, bio-energy, yoga, and massage in some of the groups at his ashram. He is the author of many books on meditation, taoism, buddhism, and mysticism, and at least six on tantra. One of them is Tantra, The Supreme Understanding, in which he unpacks the verses of the "Song of Mahamudra", by Tilopa. In addition out of his discourses on the Vigyan Bhiarav (or Vijnaya-bhairava), the 112 practices for enlightenment resulted in the much longer The Book of Secrets.

Charles Muir is a tantra teacher described as "one of the originators of the modern tantra movement" in the United States. His first book was Tantra: The Art of Conscious Loving (1989). He developed the "sacred spot massage" method.

== Criticisms ==
Georg Feuerstein, a German Indologist who also trained in tantra, writes in the epilogue of his book Tantra: Path of Ecstasy:

Many are attracted to Neo-Tantrism because it promises sexual excitement or fulfillment while clothing purely genital impulses or neurotic emotional needs in an aura of spirituality. If we knew more about the history of Tantra in India, we would no doubt find a comparable situation for every generation." He goes on to say, "Today translations of several major Tantras are readily available in book form... This gives would-be Tantrics the opportunity to concoct their own idiosyncratic ceremonies and philosophies, which they can then promote as Tantra.

Responding to criticism of modern Western Tantra, Geoffrey Samuel, a historian of Indian and Tibetan Tantra writes:

'Tantra' as a modern Western sexual and spiritual practice, however complex and contested its origins in Asia, was and is more than a fringe phenomenon of the 1960s and 1970s counterculture. On the contrary, it took up themes of considerable depth and significance within Western culture, and synthesized them creatively with borrowings from Buddhist and Hindu sources. Its slow but steady growth since the 1970s suggests that its potential has not yet been exhausted, and I would contend that to dismiss it as an empty and superficial expression of the “spiritual logic of late capitalism” is to miss the possibility of a development of real value.

According to author and critic of religion and politics Hugh Urban:

Since at least the time of Agehananda Bharati, most Western scholars have been severely critical of these new forms of pop Tantra. This "California Tantra" as Georg Feuerstein calls it, is "based on a profound misunderstanding of the Tantric path. Their main error is to confuse Tantric bliss [...] with ordinary orgasmic pleasure".

Urban says he does not consider this wrong or false, but "simply a different interpretation for a specific historical situation."

== See also ==
- Chuluaqui-Quodoushka – American pretendian and New Age figure
- Edging – Orgasm control technique
- Erotic massage – Massage of erogenous zones for sexual arousal or orgasm
- Huanjing bunao – Retrograde ejaculation in Daoism
- Neoshamanism – New forms of shamanism
- Plastic shaman – Fraudulent spiritual practitioner
- Karezza – Sexual practice
- Eroto-comatose lucidity – Sex magic technique
- Neoshamanism – New forms of shamanism
- Plastic shaman – Fraudulent spiritual practitioner
- Sex magic – Magic involving sexual activity
- Venus Butterfly – Sexual technique
