= Joseph Kramer (sexologist) =

Somatic sex educator

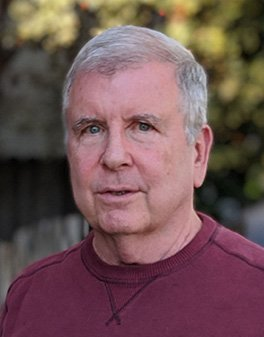
- Joseph Kramer in 2020
- Born: May 20, 1947 (age 79); St. Louis, Missouri, United States
- Website: eroticmassage.com

Joseph Kramer (born 1947) is an American sexologist, filmmaker and somatic sex educator. He is the founder of the Body Electric School and of sexological bodywork.

== Life and work ==
Kramer was born in St. Louis, Missouri. After finishing high school, he entered the Jesuit order where he spent ten years studying, teaching and preparing to become a Catholic priest. Although he left the Jesuits before ordination, Kramer found his vocation as a teacher. His early work focused on weaving together sexuality and spirituality.

In 1976, after leaving the Jesuits, Kramer moved to New York City to integrate his call to be a teacher, his Catholicism and his recent identification as a gay man. He became the head of the religion department at Convent of the Sacred Heart, an elite, all-girls Catholic school and continued to practice his religion through DignityUSA, a group for gay Catholics. He was eventually fired from his teaching position at the Convent of the Sacred Heart for being gay.

Kramer then moved to Berkeley, California, where he finished his Master of Divinity (M.Div.) degree at the Santa Clara University Jesuit School of Theology, graduated from massage school, and began practicing as a massage therapist. To disseminate his somatic teachings, he founded two institutions: the Body Electric School of Massage and Rebirthing in Oakland (approved to train professionals by the State of California in 1984), and Sexological Bodywork in San Francisco (approved as a profession by the State of California in 2003).

== The Body Electric School ==
Responding to the fear of sex among gay and bisexual men during the AIDS crisis, Kramer began developing and teaching Taoist erotic massage classes in 1986 as a safe way to sexually connect with others. Because of the presence of HIV in semen, Kramer included the Taoist sexual practice of semen retention as a crucial element of this massage.

In the Taoist erotic massage, the masseurs genitally stimulated the receivers for more than an hour with thirty different caresses, vibrations, tugs and even pauses. Those receiving were also guided in fast breathing that constantly changed speeds and rhythms. The novelty of the touch and of the paced breathing helped the receivers to stay focused on their bodily sensations. Habits of going off into erotic fantasy or self judgment were ignored as men immersed themselves in sustained sexual arousal. The touch portion of the massage ended with a Big Draw, where the receivers clenched all the muscles of their bodies and held their breath for thirty seconds, then relaxed into a fifteen-minute period of quiet often marked by joy, peacefulness, wonder and clarity.

In 1992 in collaboration with his intimate, Annie Sprinkle, Kramer began offering Taoist erotic massage classes to both men and women. Together Kramer and Sprinkle put the massage instruction on film: Fire on the Mountain in 1992, and Fire in the Valley in 1995. Because his earlier films had not dealt directly with gender diversity, in 2017 he commissioned and helped Barbara Carrellas to create Transcendent Bodies - The Erotic Awakening Massage for Trans and Gender Non-Conforming Bodies. Much of Kramer's work has been producing, directing and teaching erotic touch through film. He presently offers more than sixty hours of online streaming education for the public as well as for neotantra teachers, sex educators, sex workers, and erotic bodyworkers.

In the midst of the AIDS crisis, Kramer also recognized the need for an erotic healing profession that offered pleasurable touch to both the living and the dying. The Body Electric began training men as sexual healers, erotic bodyworkers and hedonic midwives to the dying. Kramer named these men committed to erotic service “sacred intimates.” This profession is now practiced by thousands of men and women worldwide. Their commitment, in the words of sacred intimate Don Shewey, is to “help people to wake up to the joy of life in a body.”

== Sexological bodywork ==
Because sacred intimates and other practitioners offering Taoist erotic massage did not have legal status in the United States, Kramer approached the Institute for the Advanced Study of Human Sexuality in San Francisco about offering a professional training for sexological bodyworkers. In 2003, after a thorough investigation by the California Bureau of Private Postsecondary Education, sexological bodywork was approved as a legal profession in California.

Kramer helped to found and is on the faculty of three sexological bodywork schools: the Institute of Somatic Sexology in Australia, the School of Somatic Sexology in the UK, and the Instituto Latino Americano de Sexologia Somática in Brazil. He also helped start schools in Germany and Canada. Kramer created the core sexological bodywork curriculum used in these schools and helps to upgrade the training materials each year. Sexological bodywork was featured in Gwyneth Paltrow's Netflix series, “Sex, Love and Goop” (2021), bringing new levels of attention to the profession.

== Filmography ==
- 1992 Fire on the Mountain: Male Genital Massage
- 1995 Fire in the Valley: Female Genital Massage
- 1996 Evolutionary Masturbation: An Intimate Guide to the Male Orgasm
- 1996 Uranus: Self Anal Massage for Men
- 2002 The Best of Vulva Massage
- 2004 Anal Massage for Relaxation and Pleasure
- 2005 Anal Massage for Lovers
- 2008 The Best of Penis Massage
- 2009 Lovers Getting Started with Erotic Massage
- 2011 Soft Cock Erotic Massage
- 2012 Erotic Nothingness: Allowing Sex to Have Its Way with Us
- 2017 Transcendent Bodies: Erotic Awakening Massage for Trans and Gender Non-Conforming People
