= Marjorie =

Marjorie is a female given name derived from Margaret, which means pearl. It can also be spelled as Margery, Marjory or Margaery. Marjorie is a medieval variant of Margery, influenced by the name of the herb marjoram. It came into English from the Old French, from the Latin Margarita (pearl). After the Middle Ages this name was rare, but it was revived at the end of the 19th century.

Short forms of the name include Marge, Margie, Marj and Jorie.

== People ==
- Marjorie, Countess of Carrick (also Margaret) (1253–1292), mother of Robert the Bruce
- Marjorie (singer) (1965–2024), Finnish singer
- Marjorie Abbatt (1899–1991), English toy maker and businesswoman
- Marjorie Acker (1894–1985), American artist
- Marjorie Agosín (1955–2025), American writer, activist, and professor
- Marjorie Alessandrini (1946–2014), French journalist
- Marjorie Allen Seiffert (1885–1970), American poet
- Marjorie Anderson (1913–1999), British actress and BBC radio broadcaster
- Marjorie Ogilvie Anderson (1909–2002), Scottish historian and paleographer
- Marjorie Anthony Linden (1935–2013), Canadian broadcaster and media executive
- Marjorie Arnfield (1930–2001), English landscape artist
- Marjorie May Bacon (1902–1988), British painter
- Marjorie Bailey (born 1947), Canadian sprinter
- Marjorie Baker, British photographer
- Marjorie Barnard (1897–1987), Australian writer, critic, and librarian
- Marjorie Barrett, English badminton player
- Marjorie Barretto (born 1974), actress and politician from the Philippines
- Marjorie Barrows, American woman magazine editor, book compiler and author
- Marjorie Batchelor, American mathematician
- Marjorie Bates (1882–1962), British painter
- Marjorie Bean (died 2001), first Bermudian woman to be appointed to its Legislative Council
- Marjorie Beaucage (born 1947), Métis filmmaker
- Marjorie Beebe (1908–1983), American actress
- Marjorie Bell (1906–2001), British electrical engineer and factory inspector
- Marjorie Bell Chambers (1923–2006), American educator, historian and politician
- Marjorie Bennett (1896–1982), Australian actress
- Marjorie Bentley, American dancer
- Marjorie Benton Cooke, American monologist, playwright and novelist
- Marjorie Best (1903–1997), American costume designer
- Marjorie Bick (1915–2013), Australian biochemist and environmental scientist
- Marjorie Adele Blackistone Bradfield (1911–1999), American librarian
- Marjorie Blackwood (born 1957), Canadian tennis player
- Marjorie Blamey (1919–2019), English painter and illustrator
- Marjorie Blankstein (née Rady), Canadian fundraiser, community activist, and volunteer
- Marjorie Bloch, Irish painter
- Marjorie Bonner (19th century actress), American actress
- Marjorie Bonner (Ziegfeld Follies), American dancer and actress
- Marjorie Boulton (1924–2017), British writer in English and Esperanto
- Marjorie Bowen (1885–1952), British author
- Marjorie Bradford Melville (born 1929), former Roman Catholic nun and peace activist
- Marjorie Bransfield, American actress
- Marjorie Brown (politician), British politician and first woman Lord Mayor of Birtmingham
- Marjorie Brown (1911–2000), American businesswoman and owner of the Boston Celtics
- Marjorie Browne (1910–1990), British actor
- Marjorie Lee Browne (1914–1979), African-American mathematics educator
- Marjorie Bruce or Marjorie de Brus (1296–1316), eldest daughter of Robert the Bruce, King of Scots
- Marjorie Frances Bruford (1902–1958), British artist
- Marjorie V. Butcher (1925–2016), American mathematician
- Marjorie Byrnes (born 1960), American politician
- Marjorie Cameron (1922–1995), American artist, occultist, and actress; wife of rocket pioneer Jack Parsons
- Marjorie Carpréaux (born 1987), Belgian basketball player
- Marjorie Harris Carr (1915–1998), American conservationist
- Marjorie Carroll (1932–2020), Canadian politician
- Marjorie Constance Caserio (1929–2021), American chemist
- Marjorie Sewell Cautley (1891–1954), American landscape architect
- Marjorie Celona (born 1981), American-Canadian writer
- Marjorie Chambers (1906–1989), New Zealand nurse
- Marjorie Elizabeth Jane Chandler (1897–1983), English paleobotanist
- Marjorie Chávez, Ecuadorian politician
- Marjorie Chibnall (1915–2012), English historian, medievalist and Latin translator
- Marjorie Clapprood (born 1949), Massachusetts politician and talk show host
- Marjorie Clark (1909–1993), South African track and field athlete
- Marjorie Clarke, American environmental scientist
- Marjorie Cohn (born 1948), American professor of law
- Marjorie Kowalski Cole (1953–2009), American author
- Marjorie Margaret Conley (1931–1959), Australian operatic soprano
- Marjorie Conrad (born 1988), French-American model and filmmaker
- Marjorie Content (1895–1984), American photographer
- Marjorie Cooper (1902–1984), Canadian politician
- Marjorie Corbett (1912–1995), British actress
- Marjorie Corcoran (1950–2017), American particle physicist
- Marjorie Cottle (1900–1987), British motorcycle sports rider
- Marjorie Cotton (1913–2003), Australian children's librarian
- Marjorie Courtenay-Latimer (1907–2004), South African museum official who in 1938 publicized the existence of the coelacanth
- Marjorie Cox Crawford, Australian tennis player
- Marjorie Critten, Miss Missouri in 1958
- Marjorie Crocombe (1930–2022), author and academic from the Cook Islands
- Marjorie Curry Woods, American historian of English literature
- Marjorie Dannenfelser, American anti-abortion activist, president of the Susan B. Anthony List
- Marjorie Davis, Canadian surgeon
- Marjorie Daw (actress) (1902–1979), American film actress of the silent era
- Marjorie de Sousa (born 1980), Venezuelan model and actress
- Marjorie Deane (1914–2008), British financial journalist and author
- Marjorie Deanne (1917–1994), American film actress
- Marjorie Deans (1901–1982), British screenwriter
- Marjorie Decker, American politician
- Marjorie Delassus (born 1998), French canoeist
- Marjorie Dence (1901–1966), British actress and theatre manager
- Marjorie Devaney (1931–2007), American mathematician, electrical engineer and computer scientist
- Marjorie Ruth Dilley (1903–1989), American political scientist
- Marjorie Housepian Dobkin (1922–2013), American author and professor of English
- Marjorie Dodd, American tennis player and golfer in the early 20th century
- Marjory Stoneman Douglas (1890–1998), American journalist
- Marjorie Drawbell British artist
- Marjorie Dunn, British horn player
- Marj Dusay (1936–2020), American actress
- Marjorie K. Eastman, American author and US Army veteran
- Marjorie Eaton (1901–1986), American actress and artist
- Marjorie Edgar, American folklorist
- Marjorie Esa (born 1934), Inuk artist
- Marjorie Estiano (born 1982), Brazilian actress and singer
- Marjorie Evans (c. 1850–1907), Scottish artist
- Marjorie Evasco (born 1953), Filipino poet
- Marjorie Eyre (1897–1987), English opera singer
- Marjorie Farquharson (1953–2016), Scottish political scientist and human rights worker
- Marjorie Fielding (1892–1956), British stage and film actress
- Marjorie Finlay (1928–2003), American opera singer and television personality
- Marjorie Fitzgibbon (1930–2018), Irish-American sculptor and actor
- Marjorie Flack (1897–1958), American artist and writer of children's picture books
- Marjorie Fleming (1803–1811), Scottish child writer and poet
- Marjorie Fowler (1920–2003), American film editor
- Marjorie Franklin (1887–1975), British psychoanalyst
- Marjorie Fulton (1909–1962), American violinist
- Marjorie Gaffney (1897–1963), British actress and screenwriter
- Marjorie Garber (born 1944), American author and professor
- Marjorie Gardener, British nurse educator and administrator
- Marjorie Gateson (1891–1977), American character actress in films of the 1930s and 1940s
- Marjorie Gestring (1922–1992), American springboard diver and Olympic gold medallist
- Marjorie Gladman (1908–1999), American tennis player
- Marjorie Godfrey (1919–2003), Indian politician
- Marjorie Goetschius, American composer, pianist, cellist and singer
- Marjorie Gordon (1893–1983), English actress and singer
- Marjorie Gould Drexel (1891–1955), American heiress and socialite
- Marjorie Graves (1884–1961), British civil servant, Conservative politician and writer
- Marjorie Grene (1910–2009), American philosopher
- Marjorie Grice-Hutchinson (1909–2003), English economist
- Marjorie Gross (1956–1996), Canadian television writer and producer
- Marjorie Gubelmann (born 1969), American businesswoman, owner and CEO of Vie Luxe International
- Marjorie Guthrie (1917–1983), American dancer and dance teacher
- Marjorie Gwynne, Australian artist
- Marjorie Hahn (born 1948), American mathematician and tennis player
- Marjorie Haines (1928–2014), American equestrian
- Marjorie Halpin (1937–2000), U.S.-Canadian anthropologist
- Marjorie Hanna, Canadian baseball player
- Marjorie Hannan, American actress
- Marjorie Happy, American politician
- Marjorie Harness Goodwin, American anthropologist
- Marjorie Harris (born 1937), Canadian non-fiction writer
- Marjorie Silliman Harris (1890–1976), American philosopher
- Marjorie Hall Harrison (1918–1986), British astronomer
- Marjorie L. Harth, American art historian
- Marjorie Hasler (1887–1913), Irish suffragette
- Marjorie Hayward (1885–1953), British violinist
- Marjorie Wong Hee (1905–1981), American Hawaiian painter, teacher
- Marjorie Heins, American lawyer, activist, writer, and founder of the Free Expression Policy Project
- Marjorie Henzell (born 1948), Australian politician
- Marjorie Herrera (born 2001), Salvadoran chess player
- Marjorie Herrera Lewis, American sports journalist and novelist
- Marjorie Hesse, Australian pianist and composer
- Marj Heyduck (1913–1969), American newspaper reporter, columnist and editor and radio show host
- Marjorie Hill (1886–1909), American, a founder of Alpha Kappa Alpha sorority
- Marjorie Hill Allee (1890–1945), American author
- Marjorie Hollond, American-born British economist and academic administrator
- Marjorie Holt (1920–2018), Republican U.S. Congresswoman for Maryland
- Marjorie Hood (1913–2006), American baseball player
- Marjorie Hooker (1908–1976), American mineralogist and petrologist
- Marjorie G. Horning (1917–2020), American biochemist and pharmacologist
- Marjorie Hoshelle (1918–1989), American actress
- Marjorie Maitland Howard (1898–1983), modeler, sculptor and book illustrator
- Marjorie Hoy (1941–2020), American entomologist and geneticist
- Marjorie Hughes (1925–2025), American singer in the Frankie Carle Orchestra
- Marjorie Hulsizer Copher (1892–1935), American dietitian
- Marjorie Hume (1900–1976), English film actress
- Marjorie Husain, Pakistani artist and critic
- Marjorie Husted (1892–1986), American home economist who helped develop the brand character Betty Crocker
- Marjorie Incledon, British artist
- Marjorie Ingall, American non-fiction writer
- Marjorie Jackson-Nelson (born 1931), Governor of South Australia and Australian athlete
- Marjorie Jacobs (1915–2013), Australian historian
- Marjorie Johnson (1919–2025), American baker, the "Blue Ribbon Baker" from Minnesota
- Marjorie Joyner (1896–1994), African American inventor and businesswoman
- Marjorie Kane (1909–1992), American film actress
- Marjorie Keller (1950–1994), American experimental filmmaker, author, activist, and film scholar
- Marjorie Kellogg (1922–2005), American author
- Marjorie B. Kellogg, American writer, author of Dragon Quartet
- Marjorie Kennedy (1915–2002), librarian
- Marjorie Pitter King (1921–1996), American politician from Washington
- Marjorie Korringa, igneous petrologist, volcanologist and structural geologist
- Marjorie Lajoie (born 2000), Canadian ice dancer
- Marjorie F. Lambert (1908–2006), American anthropologist and archaeologist
- Marjorie Lane (1912–2012), American singer and Broadway performer of the 1920s and 1930s
- Marjorie Lansing (1916–1998), American political scientist
- Marjorie Larney (born 1937), American athlete
- Marjorie Lawrence (1907–1979), Australian soprano
- Marjorie McKenzie Lawson (1912–2002), first black female judge in Washington D.C.
- Marjorie Leeming (1903–1987), Canadian tennis player, badminton player and teacher
- Marjorie Lees, American neuroscientist and academic
- Marjorie Lewty (1906–2002), British author of romance novels
- Marjorie Liddy, Australian indigenous elder and artist
- Marjorie Linklater (1909–1997), Scottish campaigner of the arts and environment
- Marjorie Linton (1917–1994), Canadian backstroke and freestyle swimmer who competed in the 1932 Summer Olympics
- Marjorie Liu (born 1979), American author of paranormal romance and urban fantasy novels and comic books
- Marjorie Lord (1918–2015), American television and film actress
- Marjorie Luesebrink (1943–2023), American teacher and author of hypermedia fiction
- Marjorie Lynch (1920–1977), American politician
- Marjorie Lynn (1921–2016), American singer
- Marjorie Oludhe Macgoye (1928–2015), English/Kenyan novelist, essayist and poet
- Marjorie Magner, American business executive
- Marjorie Magri (born 1986), Venezuelan actress and model
- Marjorie Main (1890–1975), American character actress
- Marjorie Margolies (born 1942), American women's rights activist and educator, member of the U.S. House of Representatives
- Marjorie Mars (1903–1991), British actress
- Marjorie Marvell (born 1938), Australian cricketer
- Marjorie Matthews (1916–1986), American Bishop of the United Methodist Church
- Marjorie Maxse (1891–1975), British political organiser and the first female chief organization officer of the Conservative Party
- Marjorie Mayans (born 1990), French rugby union player
- Marjorie McIntosh (historian) (born 1940), American historian of Great Britain
- Marjorie Batchelder McPharlin (1903–1997), American puppeteer and authority on puppet theater
- Marjorie McQuade (1934–1997), Australian swimmer
- Marjorie Meinel (1922–2008), American astronomer
- Marjorie Merryman (born 1951), American composer, author, and music educator
- Marjorie Mestayer (1880–1955), New Zealand museum curator and conchologist
- Marjorie Mikasen (born 1959), American painter
- Marj Mitchell (1948–1983), Canadian curler
- Marjorie Monaghan (born 1964), American actress
- Marjorie Montgomery (1912–1991), American child dancer and actress
- Marjorie Moreman (1902–1987), British artistic gymnast
- Marjorie Morgan (1915–2007), Canadian writer and author
- Marjorie Morrill (1908–2009), American tennis player
- Marjorie Mountain, Australian tennis player
- Marjorie Murray (1924–2010), British administrator
- Marjorie Mussett (1922–2004), British biologist and endocrinologist
- Marjorie Ann Mutchie (born 1939), American actress
- Marjorie Naylor, New Zealand artist
- Marjorie Nelson (1923–2010), American actress
- Marjorie Ngwenya (born 1979), British-born Zimbabwean-raised actuary
- Marjorie Nichols (1943–1991), Canadian journalist and writer
- Marjorie Nicholson (1914–1997), British socialist activist
- Marjorie Hope Nicolson (1894–1981), American literary scholar
- Marjorie Noël (1945–2000), French pop singer, represented Monaco in the 1965 Eurovision Song Contest
- Marjorie O'Connell, American paleontologist
- Marjorie Oelrichs (1908–1937), American socialite
- Marjorie Okell (1908–2009), track and field athlete from Great Britain
- Marjorie Olmstead, American physicist
- Marjorie Ann Orbin (born 1961), American murderer
- Marjorie Organ (1886–1930), American cartoonist
- Marjorie Ozanne (1897–1973), Guernsey author in Guernésiais, bird hospital founder
- Marjorie Paget, Marchioness of Anglesey (1883–1946), British writer on art, illustrator and member of the peerage
- Marjorie Parker (died 1991), Australian civic and political activist
- Marjorie Patterson (1891–1948), American novelist
- Marjorie Paxson (1923–2017), American journalist and editor
- Marjorie Pease (1861–1950), British politician
- Marjorie Pebworth (1910–1967), American politician
- Marjorie Peel, Scottish amateur golfer
- Marjorie Perloff (1931–2024), Austrian-born U.S. poetry critic
- Marjorie Peters (1918–2016), American baseball player
- Marjorie Pickthall (1883–1922), Canadian writer born in England
- Marjorie Pieper (1922–2008), baseball player
- Marjorie Pierce (1900–1999), American architect
- Marjorie Pigott (1904–1990), Japanese-Canadian artist
- Marjorie Pizer (1920–2016), Australian poet
- Marjorie Pollard (1899–1982), British field hockey player and writer
- Marjorie Pollitt, British teacher and communist activist
- Marjorie Merriweather Post (1887–1973), American socialite and the founder of General Foods, Inc.
- Marjorie Powell, first woman admitted to Lincoln's Inn
- Marjorie Powell Allen, American philanthropist
- Marjorie Pratt, Countess of Brecknock (died 1989), British peeress
- Marjorie Priceman (born 1958), American author and illustrator of children's books
- Marjorie Proops (1911–1996), British newspaper columnist and agony aunt
- Marjorie Pyles Honzik (1908–2003), American psychologist
- Marjorie Quarton, Irish novelist
- Marjorie Quennell (1884–1972), British historian, illustrator and museum curator
- Marjorie Rackstraw (1888–1981), educationist and social worker
- Marjorie Rambeau (1889–1970), American film and stage actress
- Marjorie Kinnan Rawlings (1896–1953), American author
- Robert and Marjorie Rawlins, American philanthropists and patrons of the arts, particularly music
- Marjorie Rendell (born 1947), federal judge and former First Lady of Pennsylvania
- Marjorie Reynolds (1917–1997), American film actress
- Marjorie Rhodes (1897–1979), British actress
- Marjorie Rice (1923–2017), American amateur mathematician
- Marjorie Riordan (1920–1984), American actress and psychologist
- Marjorie Ritchie (1948–2015), Scottish animal researcher and animal surgeon
- Marjorie Roloff Stetten (1915–1983), American biochemist
- Marjorie Rosen, American author, journalist and screenwriter
- Marjorie Rowland Clarke, American artist and sculptor
- Marjorie Rusche (born 1949), American composer
- Marjorie Ryerson, American politician
- Marjorie Sagne (born 1985), Swiss swimmer
- Marjorie Scardino (born 1947), American-British CEO of Pearson PLC
- Marjorie Schick (1941–2017), American jewelry artist and academic
- Marjorie Schwarzer (born 1957), American museum writer and educator
- Marjorie Senechal, American mathematician
- Marjorie Shapiro, American experimental physicist
- Marjorie W. Sharmat (1928–2019), American children's writer
- Marjorie Sherlock, British painter
- Marjorie Shostak (1945–1996), American anthropologist
- Marjorie Shuler, American publicist and author
- Marjorie Lynette Sigley (1928–1997), British artist, writer, actress, teacher, choreographer, theatre director and television producer
- Marjorie Silcoff, Canadian actress, a cast member on the Canadian sketch comedy TV series You Can't Do That on Television
- Marjorie Simmins (born 1955), Canadian writer, journalist and teacher
- Marjorie Simpson (1924–2003), Australian architect
- Marjorie Sinclair, Baroness Pentland (1880–1970), daughter of Sir John Campbell Hamilton-Gordon
- Marjorie Smith (born 1941), American politician
- Marjorie Parker Smith (1917–2009), American champion ice skater in dance and figure skating competitions
- Marjorie Spock (1904–2008), American environmentalist, author and poet
- Marjorie Stapp (1921–2014), American actress
- Marjorie Stedeford, Australian singer
- Marjorie Steel (1904–1985), British medical social worker
- Marjorie Stewart (1912–1988), British actress
- Marjorie Stinson (1895–1975), American aviator, pilot instructor and stunt pilot
- Marjorie McKenney Stone (born 1923), American military machinist
- Marjorie Stopford, English Girl Guide leader
- Marjorie Strider (1934–2014), American painter, sculptor and performance artist
- Marjorie Hewitt Suchocki (born 1933), American author and emerita professor of theology
- Marjorie Sweeting (1920–1994), British geomorphologist specialising in karst phenomena
- Marjorie Sykes (1905–1995), British educator
- Marjorie Tallchief (1926–2021), American ballerina
- Marjorie Taylor (1912–1974), British actress
- Marjorie Taylor (Jamaican politician) (died 2017), Jamaican politician
- Marjorie Ann Teodoro (born 1981), Filipino politician
- Marjorie Thomas (1923–2008), British opera and oratorio singer
- Marjorie Thompson (1954–2014), American biologist
- Marjorie Thomson (1913–2012), Scottish actress
- Marjorie Thorpe, Trinidadian academic and former diplomat
- Marjorie Tipping (1917–2009), Australian historian
- Marjorie Torrey (1888/91–1964), American illustrator and writer
- Marjorie Townsend (1930–2015), American electrical engineer
- Marjorie Tuite (1922–1986), American feminist activist
- Marjorie Turnbull (born 1940), American politician
- Marjorie Siksi'naaq Tutannuaq (1917–1989), Inuk artist
- Marjorie Velázquez (born 1981), American politician
- Marjorie Vilchez (born 1978), Peruvian volleyball player
- Marjorie Villis (1891–1981), British actress
- Marjorie Vincent (born 1964), American journalist
- Marjorie Vinson (1905–2000), British-born Falkland Islander teacher
- Marjorie van Vliet (1923–1990), American aviator
- Marjorie J. Vold (1913–1991), American chemist
- Marjorie Wallace (born 1954), American actress, television host and beauty queen
- Marjorie Wallace (charity executive) (born 1943), British journalist
- Marjorie Wallace (artist) (1925–2005), Scottish artist working in South Africa
- Marjorie Wang, Iranian-American neurosurgeon
- Marjorie Van de Water (1900–1962), American sociologist
- Marjorie Weaver (1913–1994), American actress
- Marjorie Welish (born 1944), American poet and artist
- Marjorie Westbury (1905–1989), English radio actress and singer
- Marjorie Wheeler-Barclay, American historian
- Marjorie Whitaker (1895–1976), English writer
- Marjorie White (1904–35), Canadian film and stage actress
- Marjorie M. Whiteman (1898–1986), American lawyer
- Marjorie Whylie (born 1944), Jamaican musical artist
- Marjorie Wilkes (born 1889), American librarian, inker, and comic book letterer
- Marjorie Williams (1958–2005), American journalist
- Marjorie Williams (astronomer) (1900–1983), American astronomer
- Marjorie Williamson (1913–2002), English physicist
- Marjorie Willison, Canadian gardener
- Marjorie Wilson (born 1951), British geologist
- Marjorie Wintermute (1919–2007), American architect
- Marjorie Wood (1882–1955), British actress
- Marjorie Curry Woods, American historian of English literature
- Marjorie Woodworth (1919–2000), American actress
- Marjorie Woolcock (1898–1965), Australian painter and sculptor
- Marjorie Woollacott, American neuroscientist
- Marjorie Muir Worthington (1900–1976), American writer
- Marjorie Wright (disambiguation), several people
- Marjorie Yang (born 1952), Hong Kong businesswoman
- Marjorie Yates (born 1941), British actress
- Marjorie Zatz (born 1955), American sociologist
- Marjorie Ziegler (1956-2018), Environmental activist and writer from Hawaii
- Marjorie Zier (1909–1952), American actress
- Marjorie Ziff (1929–2023), British philanthropist

== Fictional characters ==
- Cheryl Marjorie Blossom, an Archie Comics and Riverdale TV show character
- Lady Marjorie Bellamy, from the British TV drama series Upstairs, Downstairs
- Marj Brasch, on the New Zealand soap opera Shortland Street
- Marjorie Dean, protagonist of a series of books for girls by Josephine Chase
- Marjorie Bouvier "Marge" Simpson, in The Simpsons franchise
- Margaery Tyrell, in the A Song of Ice and Fire series of epic fantasy novels

== See also ==
- Margery (disambiguation)
- Marjoribanks, a Scottish surname
- Marjory
