= Marjorie Bonner =

Marjorie Bonner may refer to:

- Marjorie Bonner (19th century actress) (died 1895), American actress
- Marjorie Bonner (Ziegfeld Follies) (1893–1979), American dancer and actress
- Margerie Bonner (1905–1988), American actress billed as Marjorie, scriptwriter, and novelist
