= Paying the Price (1927 film) =

1927 film directed by David Selman

- Directed by: David Selman
- Screenplay by: J. Grubb Alexander
- Story by: Dorothy Howell
- Produced by: Harry Cohn
- Starring: Marjorie Bonner; Priscilla Bonner; John Miljan; George Hackathorne
- Cinematography: George Meehan
- Production company: Columbia Pictures
- Release date: April 5, 1927 (US)
- Running time: 6 reels
- Country: United States
- Language: Silent (English intertitles)

Paying the Price is a 1927 American silent drama film directed by David Selman, which stars Marjorie Bonner, Priscilla Bonner, John Miljan, and George Hackathorne. The screenplay was written by J. Grubb Alexander from a story by Dorothy Howell.

== Cast list ==
- Marjorie Bonner as Gordon daughter
- Priscilla Bonner as Gordon daughter
- John Miljan as Michael Donovan
- George Hackathorne as Basil Payson
- Mary Carr as Mrs. Gordon
- Eddie Phillips
- William Welsh as Thomas Gordon
- William Eugene as Minister

== Preservation ==
This is a surviving film (Library of Congress, Columbia Pictures).
