= Honzík =

Honzík (feminine: Honzíková) is a Czech surname. It is a diminutive of Honza, which is a pet form of the name Jan (derived from its German form Hans). Notable people with the surname include:

- David Honzík (born 1993), Czech ice hockey player
- Marjorie Pyles Honzik (1908–2003), American developmental psychologist

== See also ==
- Honza, Czech archetypal stock character
- Samuel Honzek (born 2004), Slovak ice hockey player
