= Van de Water =

Van de Water is a Dutch toponymic surname meaning "from the water". Variants are Van de Waeter, Van der Water and Van der Wateren. People with this name include:

- Abraham van de Water (1879–1938) Dutch military
- Charles F. Van de Water (1872–1920), American (California) Republican politician
- Frederic Franklyn Van de Water (1890–1968), American journalist and fiction writer
- George Roe Van De Water (1854–1925), American Episcopalian priest
- Jacobus van de Water (1643–aft.1673), Dutch mayor of New Amsterdam
- Marjorie Van de Water (1900–1962), American science writer and journalist
- Ruth Van de Water, American theoretical particle physicist
- Silvester van der Water (born 1996), Dutch football winger

== See also ==
- Van De Water Glacier, part of the near-extinct Carstensz Glacier in New Guinea, named after Abraham van de Water (1879–1938), who in 1913 was the first European to reach this "eternal" snow in this mountain range.
