= Water Music (disambiguation) =

Water Music is a 1717 composition by George Frideric Handel.

Water Music may also refer to:

- Water Music (Telemann) (Hamburger Ebb und Fluth), a a1723 orchestral suite by Georg Philipp Telemann
- Water Music, a 1952 performance piece by John Cage
- Water Music (novel), a 1982 novel by T. C. Boyle
- Water Music, a 2003 photography book by Marjorie Ryerson
- Water Music, a 2016 album by Capella de la Torre
- Shuidiao Getou (water melody), a traditional Chinese melody
