= 1976 Chess Olympiad =

1976 Chess Olympiad may refer to:

- 22nd Chess Olympiad, the official FIDE Olympiad held in Haifa, Israel, from 26 October to 10 November 1976
- Against Chess Olympiad, an unofficial Olympiad held in Tripoli, Libyan Arab Republic, from 24 October to 15 November 1976
