= Salvador Infante =

Salvadoran chess player (born 1951)

Personal information
- Born: Salvador Infante Meyer; 4 November 1951 (age 74)

Chess career
- Country: El Salvador
- Title: FIDE Master (1997)
- Peak rating: 2235 (July 1997)

Salvador Infante Meyer (born 4 November 1951) is a Salvadoran chess player. He has won the Salvadoran Chess Championship four times (1982, 1985, 1994 and 1995). He was also part of the Salvadoran team which won the gold medal at the 1976 Against Chess Olympiad in Tripoli.

== Publications ==
- Infante Meyer, Salvador (17 September 2025). El Ajedrez en El Salvador 1946 – 2010 (in Spanish). San Salvador: Universidad Dr. Andrés Bello. ISBN 978-99961-65-66-5.
