= Marj (disambiguation) =

Marj is a city in Libya.

Marj may also refer to:

== Places ==
- Marj, Iran, a village in Kerman Province
- Marenj, also Romanized as Mārj, a village in Kurdistan Province, Iran
- Marj, Lebanon, a village in tha Beqaa Governorate in Lebanon
- Marj District, a district of Libya

== People ==
- Marj Carpenter (1926–2020), American reporter and Moderator of the General Assembly of the Presbyterian Church (USA), the church's top position
- Marj Dusay (1936–2020), American actress
- Marj Heyduck (1913–1969), American newspaper reporter, columnist and editor and radio show host
- Marj Mitchell (1948–1983), Canadian curler

== Fictional characters ==
- Marj Brasch, on the New Zealand soap opera Shortland Street

== See also ==
- Marjorie
- Marge (disambiguation)
