= Sonia Zepeda =

Salvadoran chess player (born 1981)

Personal information
- Born: Sonia Guadalupe Zepeda Cortéz; 26 January 1981 (age 45) San Salvador, El Salvador

Chess career
- Country: El Salvador
- Title: Woman International Master (2007)
- FIDE rating: 2066 (January 2012)
- Peak rating: 2136 (July 2009)

Sonia Guadalupe Zepeda Cortéz (born 26 January 1981) is a Salvadoran chess player. Zepeda was taught to play chess by her father Rafael Zepeda (peak Elo rating 2069). Her younger sister Lorena Zepeda is also a chess player. Sonia Zepeda was trained by International Master Héctor Leyva.

She has won the Salvadoran Women's Chess Championship 5 times (1997, 1998, 1999, 2000 and 2009) and has won the Central American Women's Chess Championship twice. She has been a part of the El Salvador national chess team for four Olympics.
