= Salvadoran Chess Championship =

Chess competition

The chess championship of El Salvador is organized by the Salvadoran Chess Federation (Spanish: Federación Salvadoreña de Ajedrez), and was first held in 1946. FIDE Master Boris Pineda has won the title a record eight times. A separate Salvadoran Women's Chess Championship has also been held annually since 1992.

== National championship winners ==
Year	National champion
1946	Antonio Salazar
1947	Antonio González
1952	Juan Serrano
1954	Benjamin Oliva
1955	Juan Serrano
1958	Benjamin Oliva
1959	Donato Pineda
1960	Donato Pineda
1961	Benjamin Oliva
1962	Juan Serrano
1963	Helios Quintanilla
1964	Jaime Soley
1965	Juan Serrano
1966	Atilio Mojica
1967	Benjamín Rojas
1968	Benjamín Rojas
1969	Atilio Mojica
1970	Leonardo Mena
1971	Antonio Grimaldi
1972	Atilio Mojica
1973	Antonio Grimaldi
1974	René Grimaldi
1975	Boris Pineda
1976	Boris Pineda
1977	Boris Pineda
1978	René Grimaldi
1979	Manuel Velásquez
1980	Manuel Velásquez
1982	Salvador Infante
1984	Eduardo Vásquez
1985	Salvador Infante
1987	René Grimaldi
1989	René Grimaldi
1990	Roberto Camacho
1991	Boris Pineda
1992	Boris Pineda
1994	Salvador Infante
1995	Salvador Infante
1996	Boris Pineda
1997	Roberto Camacho
1998	Boris Pineda
1999	Héctor Leyva
2000	Héctor Leyva
2001	Lemnys Arias
2002	Carlos Burgos
2003	Boris Pineda
2004	Carlos Burgos
2005	Héctor Leyva
2006	Lemnys Arias
2007	Lemnys Arias
2008	Héctor Leyva
2009	Héctor Leyva
2010	Héctor Leyva
2011	Oscar Velásquez
2012	Gustavo Aguilar
2013	Daniel Arias
2014	Carlos Burgos
2015	Carlos Burgos
2016	Ricardo Chávez
2017	Jorge Giron
2018	Lemnys Arias
2019	Lemnys Arias
2020	Lemnys Arias
2021	Ricardo Chávez
2022	Jorge Girón

== Women's championship winners ==
Year	Women's champion
1992	Reyna Chávez
1993	Reyna Chávez
1994	Brenda Cienfuegos
1995	Brenda Cienfuegos
1996	Brenda Cienfuegos
1997	Sonia Zepeda
1998	Sonia Zepeda
1999	Sonia Zepeda
2000	Sonia Zepeda
2001	Lorena Zepeda
2002	Lorena Zepeda
2003	Nayda Avalos
2004	Lorena Zepeda
2005	Lorena Zepeda
2006	Lorena Zepeda
2007	Lorena Zepeda
2008	Ada Castañeda
2009	Sonia Zepeda
2010	Marcela Aguilar
2011	Bera Hernandez
2012	Gabriela Avelar
2013	Ingrid Sanchez
2014	Ingrid Sanchez
2015	Ingrid Sanchez
2016	Marjorie Herrera
2017	Judith Santos
2018	Andrea Ortez
2019	Marjorie Herrera
2020	Andrea Ortez
2021	Angie Garcia
2022	Andrea Ortez
