= Marge (disambiguation) =

Marge is a feminine given name.

Marge may also refer to:

- Marge (cartoonist), pen name of American cartoonist Marjorie Henderson Buell (1904–1993), creator of Little Lulu
- Margarine, called marge in Britain and Australia
- Tropical Storm Marge (disambiguation), various tropical storms and typhoons
- La Marge (English: The Margin (novel)), a 1967 novel by André Pieyre de Mandiargues
  - La Marge (English: The Margin (film)), a 1976 French erotic film adaptation of the novel starring Sylvia Kristel
- Marge Records, a French jazz record label, now renamed Futura Marge

== See also ==
- Marj (disambiguation)
