= World Youth Day 2008 =

International Catholic youth event

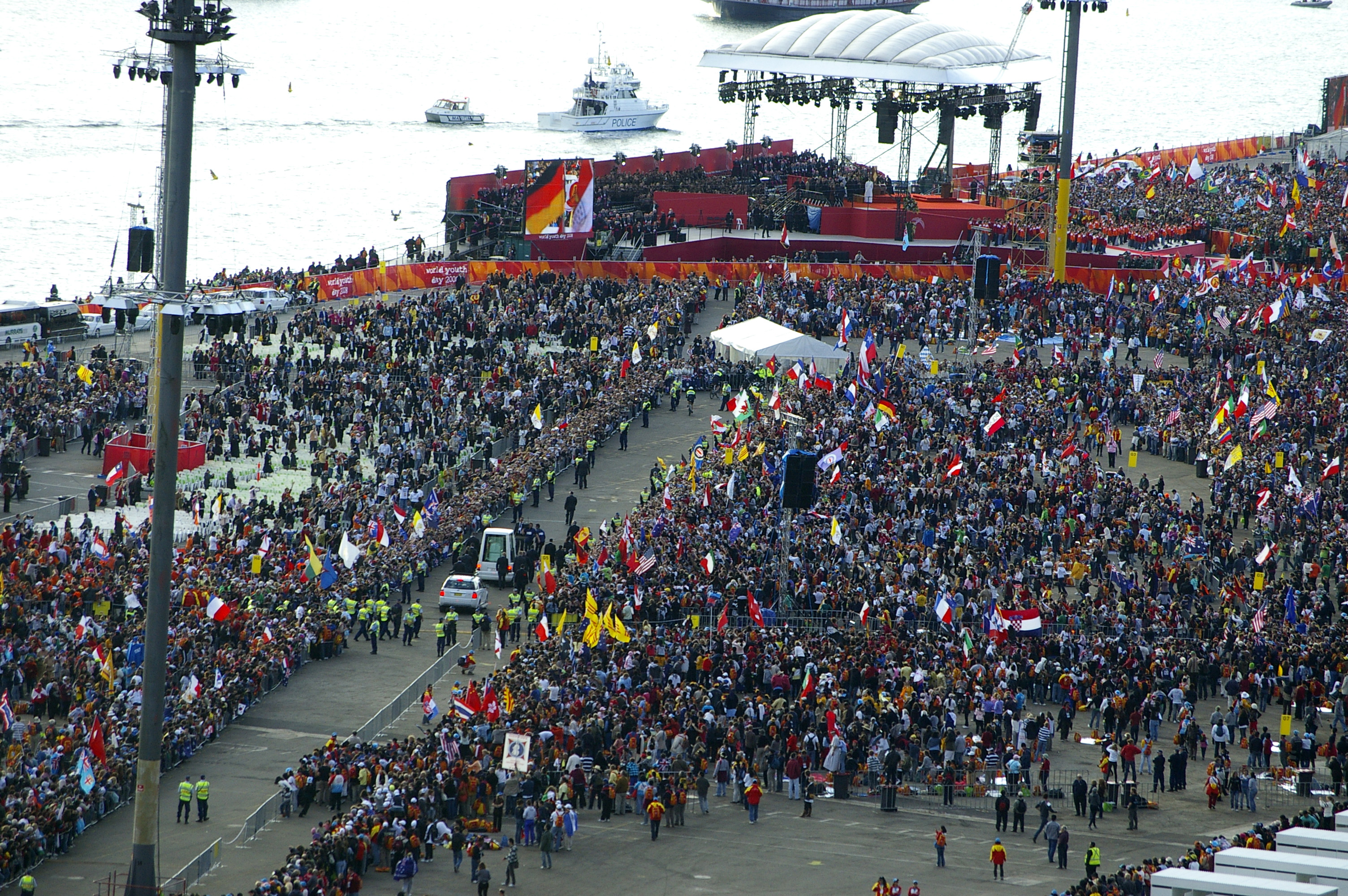
- Date: 15 July 2008- 20 July 2008
- Location: Sydney, New South Wales, Australia; 33°54′39″S 151°13′49″E
- Type: Youth festival
- Theme: You will receive the power when the Holy Spirit comes upon you (Acts 1:8)
- Organised by: Catholic Church
- Participants: Pope Benedict XVI
- Previous: 2005 Cologne
- Next: 2011 Madrid

World Youth Day 2008 was a Catholic youth festival that started on 15 July and continued until 20 July 2008 in Sydney, Australia. It was the first World Youth Day held in Australia and the first World Youth Day in Oceania. This meeting was decided by Pope Benedict XVI, during the Cologne World Youth Day of 2005. The theme was "You will receive power when the Holy Spirit comes upon you" (from Acts 1:8).

About 500,000 young people from 200 countries attended during the week, and more than 1,000,000 came for the weekend. They were joined by about 600 bishops and cardinals, as well as by 6,600 reporters.

== Schedule of events ==
The festivals of WYD began on 1 July 2007, when a large 3.8-meter-high wooden cross and a large 15-kilogram icon of the Virgin Mary arrived in Sydney to travel around the country. The relay-style event, known as the Journey of the Cross and Icon (or JCI for short) saw the cross and icon go on a pilgrimage around the dioceses of Australia, engaging with a variety of Catholic parishes and communities.

The WYD Cross was entrusted to the youth of the world by Pope John Paul II in 1984 as a sign of peace and hope. The Pope told the young people of the world to take it around the world as "a symbol of Christ's love for humanity". In 2004, Pope John Paul II commissioned the large icon of the Virgin Mary to accompany the cross' pilgrimage. It is a symbol intended to represent Mary's maternal love for young people. From the announcement of the host World Youth Day, the cross and icon travel ceremonially around the world similar to the Olympic torch relay.

In the week preceding the main event, many young Catholic pilgrims spent time in different parts of Australia and New Zealand, staying with a local parish as part of the Days in the Dioceses program. After their stay, they travelled to Sydney for the Opening Mass of the week-long main event.

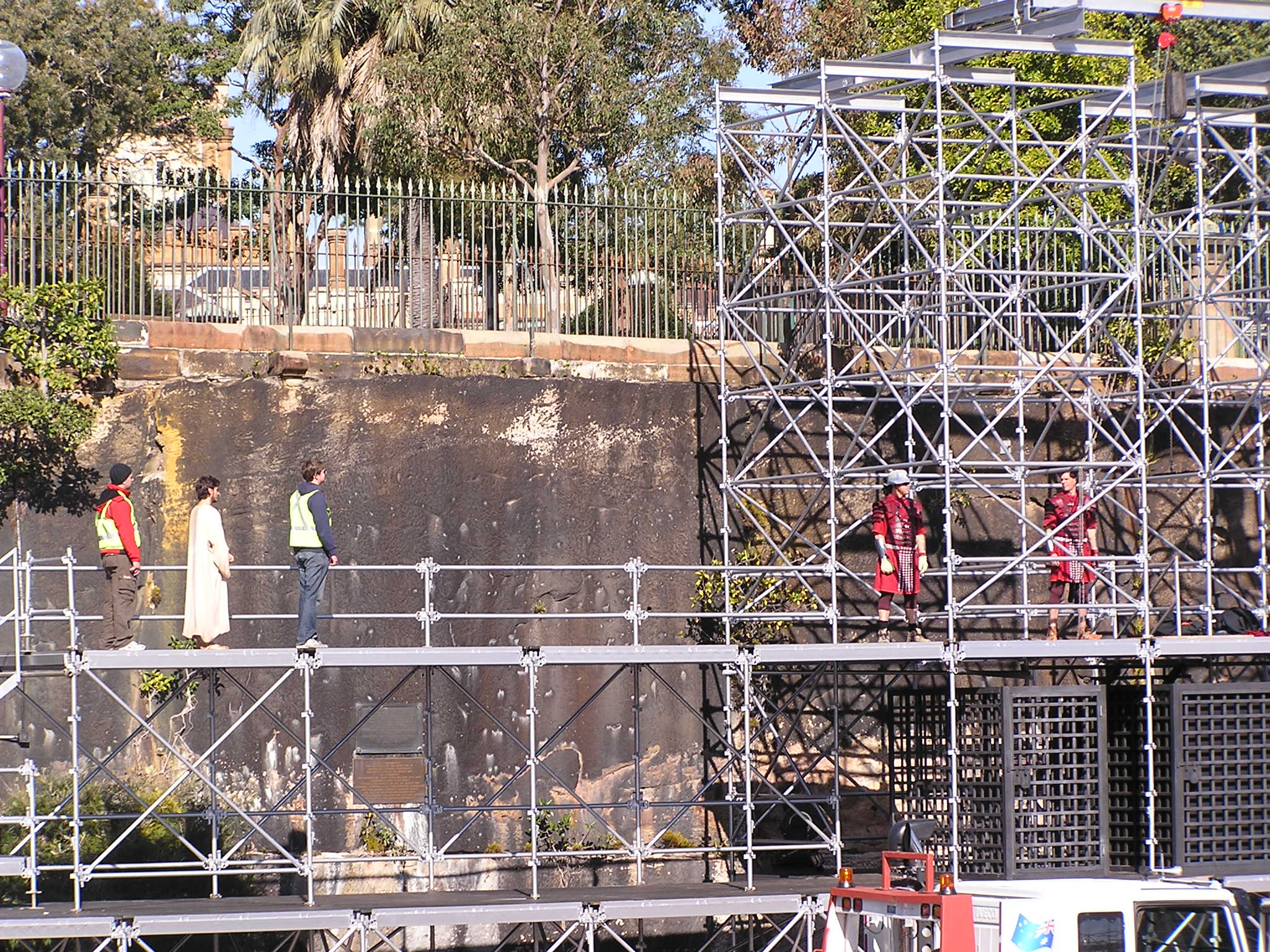
Rehearsal for Stations of the Cross on 12 July near the Sydney Opera House

The Pope arrived at Sydney on 13 July at Richmond Air Force Base in North Western Sydney on a special Alitalia flight. Until 17 July he stayed in the Opus Dei centre, called Kenthurst Study Centre, 30 km from Sydney.

On 15 July, World Youth Day 2008 began with the Opening Mass celebrated by Cardinal George Pell, the Archbishop of Sydney, at Barangaroo. This was followed by a concert.

Each morning from 15 to 17 July, Catechists were held in approximately 300 locations. Pilgrims received teachings from a bishop and also celebrated Mass. In the afternoons, pilgrims journeyed into the city and attend the Youth Festival consisting of a series of art exhibitions, concerts, seminars and conferences.

On 17 July 2008, 500,000 attendees from around the world were present at Barangaroo to welcome Pope Benedict XVI on a day dubbed Super Thursday by the press. The Pope actually arrived on 14 July, but only appeared in public for the first time on the 17th. The event involved the Pope travelling around Port Jackson in a "boatacade" where pilgrims lined the shores to see him. However, there were many disappointed spectators in places like the Botanic Gardens and Circular Quay who did not actually see the Pope because of where he was sitting on the boat. The Sydney Children's Choir and Gondwana Voices performed at the event. The Pope then spoke extensively to the pilgrims and greeted them in five foreign languages. In order to let the pilgrims see him better the Pope was driven around Barangaroo through the crowds in his Popemobile.

Dear young people, let me now ask you a question... How are you using the gifts you have been given, the "power" which the Holy Spirit is even now prepared to release within you? What legacy will you leave to young people yet to come? What difference will you make?

— Pope Benedict XVI

On 18 July, there was a live re-enactment of the Stations of the Cross at major city landmarks with an estimated 270,000 participants. Around 500 million people around the world followed the stations on television.

On 19 July, around 235,000 pilgrims embarked on a 10-kilometre pilgrimage walk, beginning at the Mary MacKillop Chapel in North Sydney, over the Sydney Harbour Bridge and across the city to attend an overnight vigil before the Mass at Randwick Racecourse.

Approximately 250,000 pilgrims slept overnight at Randwick, and about 300,000 to 400,000 participants attended the Final Mass celebrated by Pope Benedict XVI on Sunday 20 July.

Pope Benedict continued a tradition of Australian Papal Masses at Randwick Racecourse, following in the footsteps of John Paul II and Paul VI. At the conclusion of the final mass the Pope announced that the 2011 World Youth Day would be held in Madrid, Spain.

=== Web 2.0 ===
WYD 2008 was the first World Youth Day to take full advantage of telecommunications, with Pope Benedict sending text messages to the pilgrims during the week. Each pilgrim who registered for WYD had the option of providing a mobile phone number to which the Pontiff's message would be sent at the beginning of each day.

TEXT MESSAGES FROM POPE BENEDICT XVI TO WYD2008 PILGRIMS
Date	Papal Message
TUE 15 July	Young friend, God and his people expect much from you because you have within you the Fathers supreme gift: the Spirit of Jesus –BXVI
WED 16 July	The Holy Spirit gave the Apostles and gives you the power boldly to proclaim that Christ is risen! –BXVI
THU 17 July	The Holy Spirit is the principal agent of salvation history: let him write your life history 2! –BXVI
FRI 18 July	The spirit impels us 4ward 2wards others; the fire of his love makes us missionaries of God's charity. See you tomorrow nite –BXVI
SAT 19 July	Dear friend, you must be holy & you must be missionary: never separate holiness from mission –BXVI

It also saw the launch of a new registration social networking site called xt3.com, with the aim to connect young Catholics before, during and after World Youth Day 2008.

On 8 September, a final message was sent via SMS to WYD2008 pilgrims registered on Xt3.com, marking 50 days after the closing Mass:

Dear Friends,
Fifty days ago we were together for the celebration of Mass. Today I greet you on the birthday of Mary, Mother of the Church. Empowered by the Spirit and courageous like Mary your pilgrimage of faith fills the Church with life! Soon I am to visit France. I ask you all to join me in praying for the young people of France. May we all be rejuvenated in hope!

=== Food ===
Pilgrims were served a traditional Australian menu. Over the six-day event, 3.5 million meals were served. To cater for the masses, 210,000 slices of bread, 425,000 chocolate bars, 200,000 meat pies and 300,000 servings of Weet-Bix Crunch were ordered. "We want to provide pilgrims with a good feed and a little bit of an Australian taste," WYD director of services Geoff Morris said; "We have tried to do that by including some of our more iconic items such as Tim Tams, Weet-Bix Crunch, Vegemite, lamingtons and good old baked beans". Organisers also held a "Big Aussie BBQ", which saw 200 barbecues lit up simultaneously across Sydney.

There's nothing immoral with a little commercialism. Our way of life is built on commercialism, on trade, on industry, on finance and people have got a right to make a living out of doing a good thing, which is spreading Christ's message in a modern way.

— Cardinal George Pell

=== Souvenirs ===
Pilgrims and the public were able to buy 470 different products including papal mementos such as special WYD rosary beads, Pope Benedict XVI baseball caps and rugby jerseys. Sydney's Catholic Archbishop Cardinal George Pell said that the Church was not looking to make a profit.

Any remaining merchandise was given to Catholic charities and surplus clothing was sent overseas to developing nations.

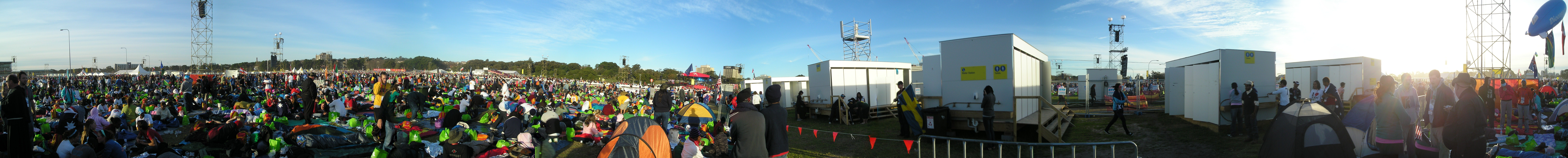
Panoramic image of crowd at vigil on 19 July

== Attendance ==
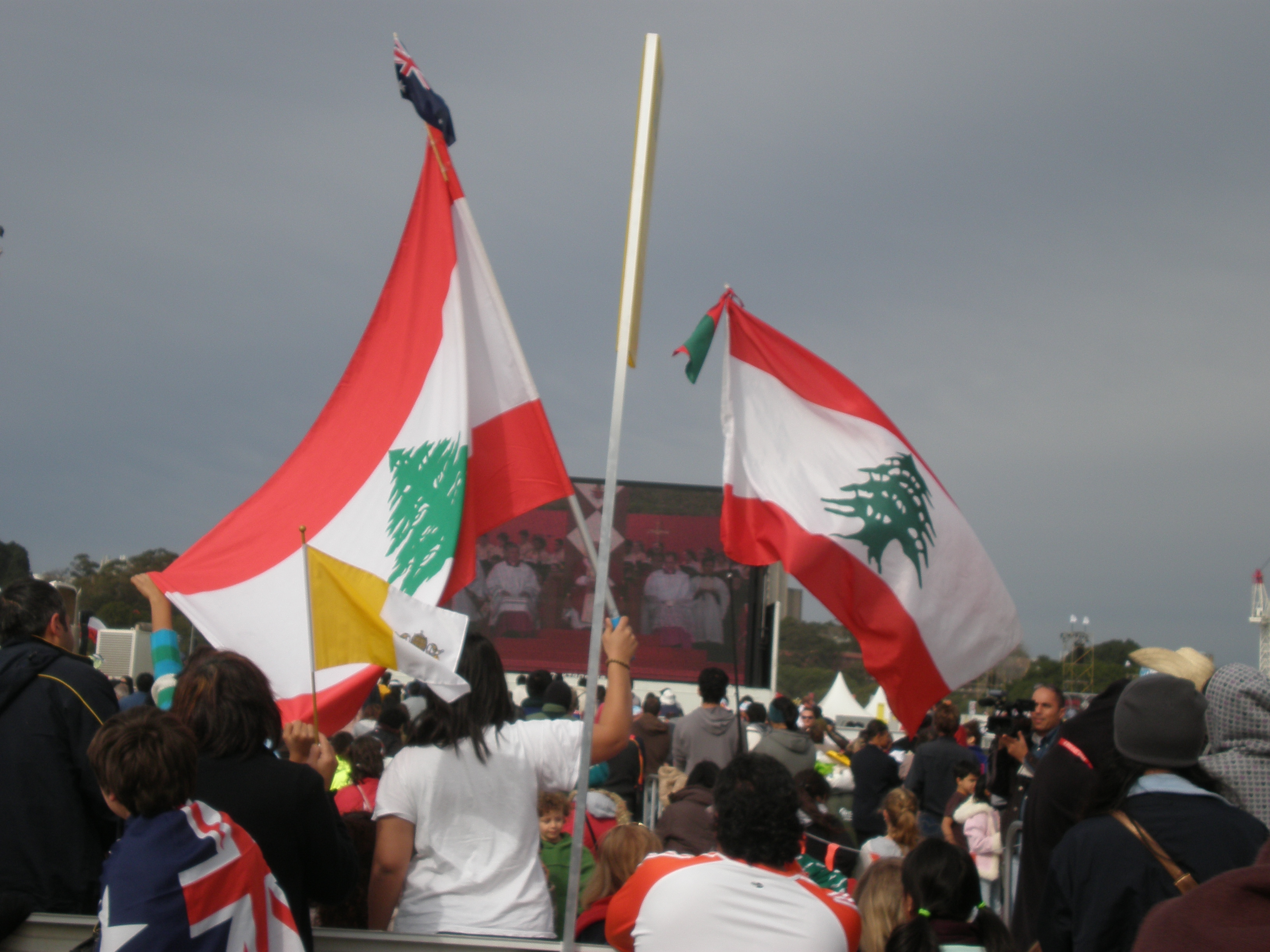
Lebanese wave their country's flag at the 2008 World Youth Day

World Youth Day organizers revised the expected number of attendees downwards during the lead-up to the event. In October 2007, the Catholic Archbishop of Sydney, George Pell, claimed that "over half a million" people would attend the final mass at Randwick. The World Youth Day site later claimed likely attendance of "up to" half a million. Similarly, the projected number of overseas attendees was 150,000 people in 2006. This was later altered to a projection of "over 125,000" people from overseas. 65,000 visas were granted as of 12 days before the start of the event.

Around 500,000 welcomed the pope to Sydney and 270,000 watched the Stations of the Cross. More than 300,000 pilgrims camped out overnight in preparation for the Final Mass. The final attendance reported by Reuters was up to 300,000, however World Youth Day's Chief Operating Officer Danny Casey and other media reported over 400,000 attendees.

== Marjorie's Bird ==
Marjorie Dunn Liddy, a Tiwi Islands woman who was raised by Catholic nuns on Melville Island painted a white dot bird on a navy background which became the image for the World Youth Day 2008. The image is commonly known as Marjorie’s Bird, although Liddy calls it The Day The Holy Spirit Visited Marjorie And Her People, her people being a reference to all Australians.

Liddy had never painted before she created this image which was included on the back of the chasubles for the papal Mass. Liddy tells the story of being touched by the Holy Spirit after a day of fishing which provided the inspiration for the image.

== Official song ==
"Receive the Power", an original song written by Guy Sebastian and Gary Pinto, was chosen in May 2007 as the official anthem for World Youth Day 2008.

"Receive the Power" was played extensively throughout the six days of World Youth Day and also in the television coverage which went around the world. Sebastian performed at the concert after the Opening Mass which officially welcomed Pope Benedict XVI to Australia. Sebastian and Paulini also performed both the English and international versions at the Final Mass at Randwick Racecourse on 20 July. An estimated 400,000 people attended the mass. Sebastian and Paulini were invited to perform "Receive The Power" at the Pope's farewell and thank you to volunteers on 21 July.

== Indulgences ==
The Pope announced that pilgrims at World Youth Day 2008 and those from around the world who pray for the "spiritual goals of this meeting and for its happy outcome" would be able to receive indulgences. In Roman Catholic teaching an indulgence is believed to erase the temporal punishment (time spent in purgatory) which results from sin.

Two types of indulgences were available:

- plenary (full) indulgence – for attendees
- partial indulgence – for those who pray

== Controversies around the World Youth Day ==
=== Public funding ===
Some were concerned regarding the NSW state government's public funding of $129 million and the federal government's funding of $55 million. Some described it as a "promotional event" for the Catholic Church.

However the Sydney Chamber of Commerce estimated that World Youth Day would generate $230 million of economic activity and the NSW state government claimed that it would have a direct economic benefit over $150 million. In addition to direct benefits the state government said that the coverage of World Youth Day overseas was worth at least $1 billion. These gains would offset and exceed the government's expenditure on World Youth Day.

=== Use of Randwick Racecourse ===
The Final Mass held at Southern Cross Precinct (named specifically for the event) drew 350,000 pilgrims.

The use of the Randwick Racecourse for the event was criticised and legally challenged by the racing industry in Sydney. Industry representatives argued that alternative sites, such as the Sydney Olympic Park at Homebush Bay, were more suitable venues. However, the NSW and federal governments and the event organisers insisted that Randwick Racecourse was the only location suitable for an event of such scale.

The World Youth Day committee initially offered to pay an agreed settlement to the racing industry. However, after some complaints, the federal and the New South Wales state government stepped in and jointly pledged $42 million in compensation to the racing industry – more than triple the previously agreed upon amount. In exchange, the industry relocated its operations to the Warwick Farm and Rosehill Gardens racecourses, with infrastructure at these sites and at Randwick to be upgraded as part of the compensation package. In addition, the Australian Jockey Club's lease at Randwick was to be extended by 50 years.

Despite some earlier concerns the final mass left the turf in good condition. The Randwick Project Steering Committee chief Hugh Martin stated that he was "very pleased with the state of the track" and an Australian Jockey Club spokesman noted that the "track seems to have held up well."

=== World Youth Day legislation ===
The Parliament of New South Wales passed the World Youth Day Act 2006 especially for the event. The regulations made under this act however had been the source of some controversy, mainly in the operation of various provisions of the World Youth Day Regulation 2008 within hundreds of so-called "declared areas" across Sydney. These areas included over 40 city locations, including popular tourist spots the Sydney Opera House and the Sydney Harbour Bridge, as well as at numerous public transport stations and schools.

The most significant and contentious amendments to the regulations were announced by the Deputy Premier John Watkins on 25 June 2008 and came into effect on 1 July 2008. People entering or exiting declared areas would have been subject to being searched, including vehicles or baggage, if so requested. According to The Australian, this may have included either general clothing inspections, partial strip searches, or even arrest. The regulations would have been enforced by police, with the Rural Fire Service and the State Emergency Service having enforcement power over some provisions. These authorisations were especially controversial, as such granted enforcement powers are normally available only to police. The new powers also caused concern to those organisations, which did not consider enforcement to be their role.

Of the most contentious of the regulations, a maximum fine of A$5,500 was able to be imposed for causing 'annoyance or inconvenience' to WYD participants. This was challenged in the Federal Court of Australia on the grounds of violating the implied constitutional freedom of political communication and/or exceeding the regulation making power of the World Youth Day Act 2006 (NSW). The Full Court agreed with the latter argument, declaring Clause 7(1)(b) regarding the specific prohibition of causing "annoyance to participants in a World Youth Day event" invalid.

=== Protest groups ===
A number of activist groups protested against the Catholic Church on World Youth Day. Various atheist and secular groups cooperated to form the NoToPope Coalition for WYD. The coalition rallied against the church's stances on same-sex marriage, abortion and contraception. Additionally, groups representing some victims of sexual abuse protested prior to WYD. On Saturday, the day of the pilgrimage walk, approximately 100 protesters positioned themselves on a street corner to chant slogans and wave banners at the over 200,000 pilgrims walking to Randwick. A strong police presence controlled the protesters.

Protest organisers had planned to use t-shirts with anti-Catholic slogans such as "Religion harms us by privileging faith over reason", "Badly needed community services were robbed to pay the Pope" and "107 Catholic clergy convicted".

There were very few physical confrontations between the pilgrims and protesters, with some initiated by the protesters throwing condoms at the pilgrims. Police arrested one Australian pilgrim for attacking a protester. A Sydney small business owner alleged that he received an anonymous threat against him and his family for producing "annoying" t-shirts.

=== Controversy over comments by Bishop Anthony Fisher ===
WYD coordinator Bishop Fisher told journalists the latest controversy was detracting from the massive Catholic youth festival underway in Sydney. "I think most of Australia was enjoying, delighting in the beauty and goodness of these young people... rather than dwelling crankily, as a few people are doing, on old wounds."

Anthony and Christine Foster spoke out on the bishop's comments, labelling them "very insensitive". Their daughters Emma and Katherine were raped by priest Kevin O'Donnell leading to Emma's suicide at the age of 26, while her sister Katherine drank heavily before being left disabled when hit by a drunk driver in 1999. Advocates for Survivors of Child Abuse director Michael Salter was outraged by Bishop Fisher's comments, saying, "The Catholic Church has a lot to learn about the burden of clergy abuse on the lives of victims, and those who care for them."

Bishop Fisher later said he had been misquoted by media representatives who, according to him, had been the people he had called "cranky" and not the victims.

=== Transport concerns ===
An additional 4,000 train and 3,400 bus services were commissioned for the event. There were 400 road clearways and 300 road closures. Threats to strike on 17 July in the heart of the celebrations, made by disgruntled rail workers, were withdrawn following negotiations with the state government.

Following World Youth Day, the NSW Premier Morris Iemma gave the transport systems' performance a 10-out-of-10 rating. He stated that special events such as WYD proved that decent public transport was possible and was considering implementing some of the strategies used for the event on an ongoing basis. Former Roads and Traffic Authority director Ken Robinson said that the public transport system ran smoothly during World Youth Day due to better coordination between different transport authorities, whilst NSW transport minister John Watkins noted that public transport for the week worked "tremendously well."

=== Apology, meeting with victims and criticisms ===
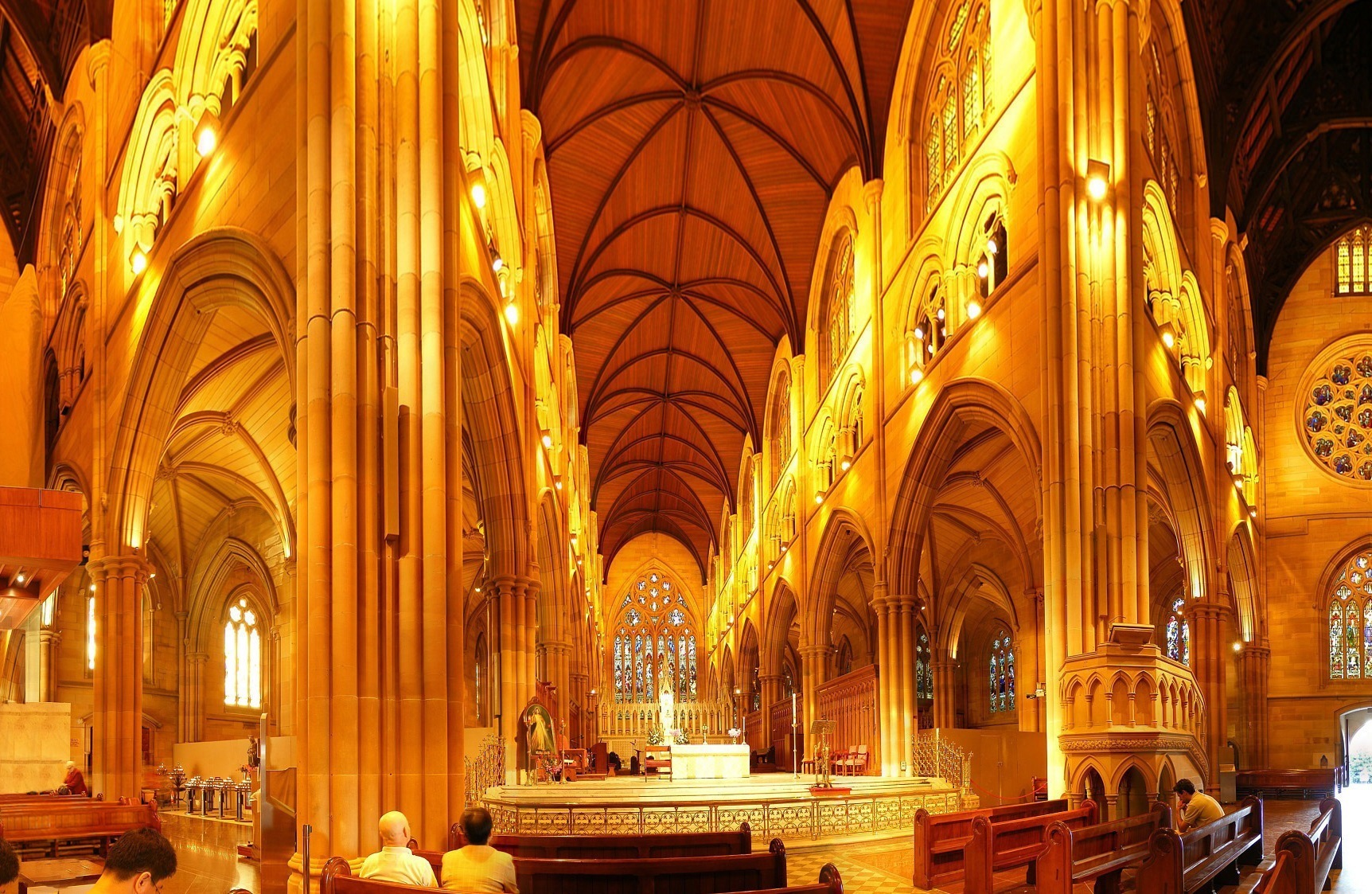
St. Mary's Cathedral, Sydney, Australia, the Pope's residence during World Youth Day 2008.

On 19 July 2008, in Sydney's St. Mary's Cathedral, Pope Benedict XVI made a historic full apology for child sex abuse by priests and clergymen in Australia. Before a congregation of 3,400, he called for compensation and demanded punishment for those guilty of the "evil": "Here I would like to pause to acknowledge the shame which we have all felt as a result of the sexual abuse of minors by some clergy and religious in this country. I am deeply sorry for the pain and suffering the victims have endured and I assure them that, as their pastor, I too share in their suffering." The Pope added: "Victims should receive compassion and care, and those responsible for these evils must be brought to justice. These misdeeds, which constitute so grave a betrayal of trust, deserve unequivocal condemnation. I ask all of you to support and assist your bishops, and to work together with them in combating this evil. It is an urgent priority to promote a safer and more wholesome environment, especially for young people." On 21 July, before flying out of Australia Pope Benedict met with a group of four victims of sexual abuse at St. Mary's Cathedral in Sydney, listened to their stories and celebrated mass with them. Broken Rites, the support group representing Australian victims, criticised the meeting as hand-picked: "I'm afraid that what they've done is selected victims who have agreed with what the church's policies are".

Broken Rites said: "Sorry may be a start but we want to see a lot more. We want the victims to be treated fairly, we don't want them to feel that they have been shut out, we don't want them to be re-abused by church authorities." It reported that there were 107 Catholic priests and religious brothers sentenced in Australian courts on sex charges, and that in 2002, Australian bishops had already apologised for past abuses.

The then NSW Premier Morris Iemma said he hoped "it would be a sign of righting the wrongs of the past and of a better future and better treatment by the church of the victims and their families."

== Departure ==
The Pontiff departed from Sydney Airport on 21 July 2008. Before boarding a chartered Qantas Boeing 747-400 at Sydney Airport's Hangar 96, he thanked Prime Minister Kevin Rudd, Governor General Major General Michael Jeffery, newly appointed Ambassador to the Holy See Tim Fischer, and Cardinal George Pell. The Pontiff left Australia after the farewell message of thanks by Rudd: "Today I announce that for the first time Australia will have a resident Ambassador to the Holy See in Rome. And today I announce that the Government will be recommending to his Excellency the Governor General the appointment of the former Deputy Prime Minister of Australia the Honourable Tim Fischer as Australia’s first resident Ambassador to the Holy See."
