= Elizabeth Kugmucheak Alooq =

Inuk artist

- Born: 1943 (age 82–83)
- Known for: Drawing, printmaking
- Movement: Baker Lake printmaking

Elizabeth Kugmucheak Alooq (born 1943) is an Inuk artist who lives in Baker Lake, Nunavut. She is the daughter of Marjorie Siksi'naaq Tutannuaq who was also an Inuk artist from Baker Lake.

Alooq was among the Baker Lake printmaking wave of the 60s and 70s. She draws mainly animals and nature with narratives.

Her work is included in the collections of the McMichael Canadian Art Collection and the Winnipeg Art Gallery.
