= Perth Theatre =

Theatre in Perth, Scotland

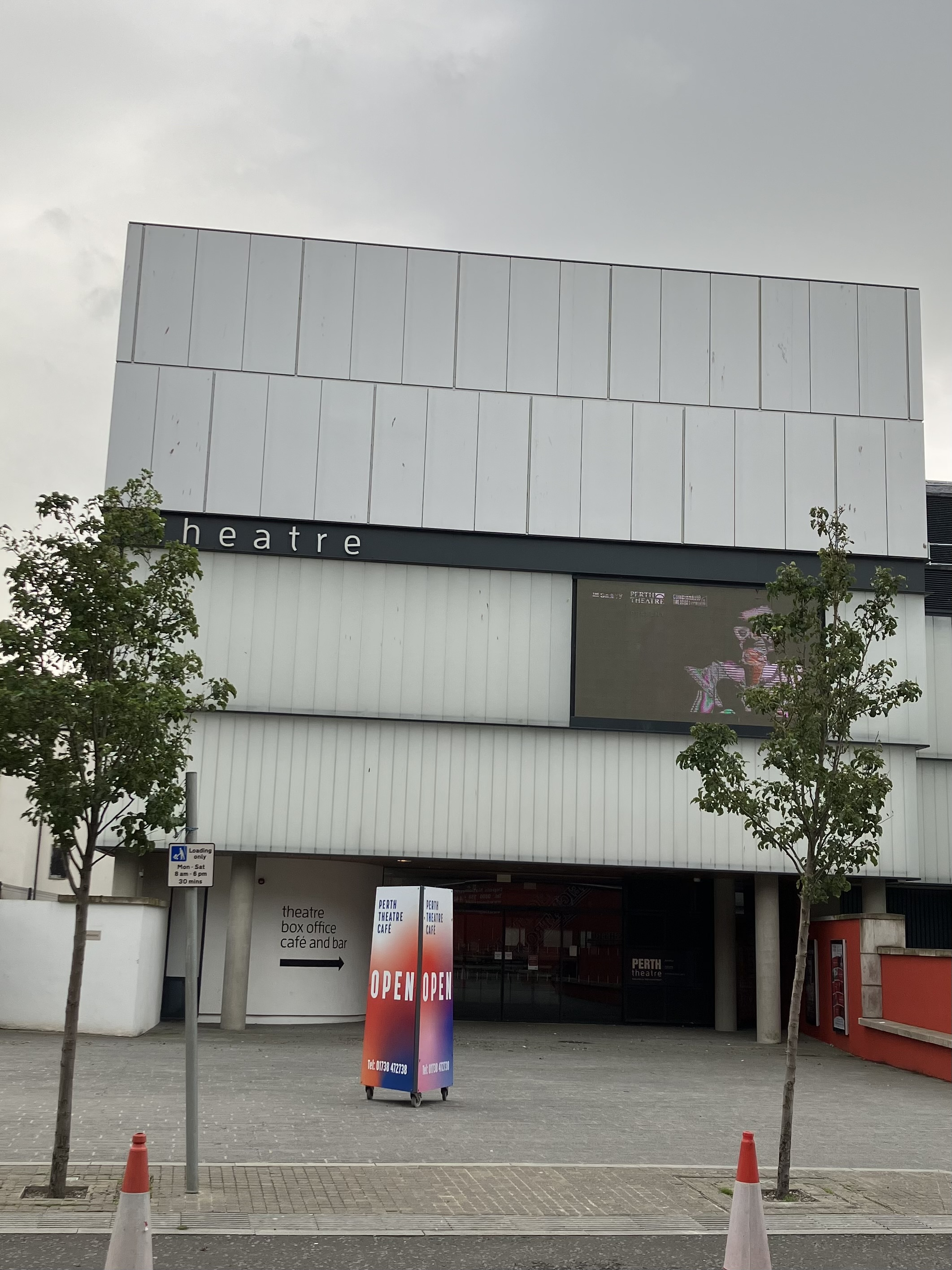
- Entrance to Perth Theatre, September 2023
- Interactive map of Perth Theatre
- Address: New Entrance; Mill Street; Traditional Entrance; 185 High Street; Perth, Scotland
- Coordinates: 56.3970°N 3.4318°W
- Owner: Perth & Kinross Council
- Capacity: 500 (Victorian Auditorium)
- Type: Theatre
- Designation: Category B listed

Construction
- Opened: 1900 (126 years ago)
- Years active: 1900 onwards
- Architect: William Alexander

Website
- horsecross.co.uk/perth-theatre

Perth Theatre is an entertainment venue in Mill Street, Perth, Scotland. It opened in 1900 and was extended in the 1980s.

The building is category B listed by Historic Environment Scotland, and is operated by the charitable organisation Horsecross Arts, alongside sister venue Perth Concert Hall.

== History ==
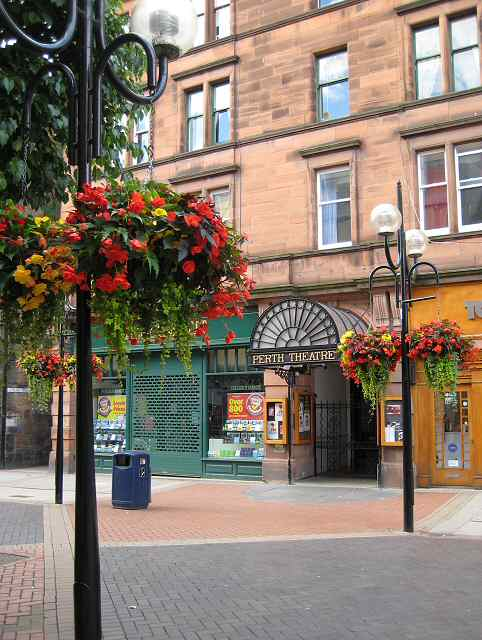
The High Street entrance to the theatre

The theatre opened on Perth High Street in 1900 (replacing a previous one, built in 1820, that stood at the northeastern corner of Atholl and Kinnoull Streets), and was planned to seat 950 in the auditorium, with pit, two balconies and boxes. It was created by the Perth Theatre & Opera House Co Ltd and designed by Dundee's City Architect William Alexander. It is similar in style and layout to his design of Her Majesty's Theatre, Dundee, but on a smaller scale. The foundation stone was laid in 1899 by actor George Alexander. The founding lessee was JH Savile, who owned Paisley Theatre, and in 1909 bought the Perth theatre outright. The Savile family continued to run the theatre until 1935, staging drama, opera, musicals, pantomime, revues and variety. JH Savile also founded his own Repertory Companies in Paisley and Perth.

In 1935, Perth Theatre was sold to a new company created in London, the Perth Repertory Theatre Ltd., by Ernest Dence in support of his actress daughter Marjorie Dence, who succeeded as owner in 1937 on his death. Marjorie Dence and actor David Steuart co-founded their new venture, the Perth Repertory Company, whose annual and highly acclaimed work covered nine months of repertory in and around Perth with three months of touring of the Highlands & Islands, to the Northern Isles, and to the lowland towns of the Borders. In the first year alone 51 plays were produced. Perth Theatre hosted the first Scottish Theatre Festival in 1939 and again in 1945.

In her will, Dence gave first option to buy the theatre to the Scottish Committee of the Arts Council, which did so and transferred it to Perth City Council. Joan Knight was appointed as artistic director in 1968, continuing the repertory company and mentoring performers and would-be-directors. During her 26-year tenure at Perth Theatre, she oversaw a major rebuilding programme in 1981 and 1985, adding a restaurant, studio theatre, rehearsal room, more dressing rooms and a workshop facility. Knight was known locally as Perth's "Queen of Theatre" and received an OBE for services to theatre in 1985.

In 2005, Perth Theatre's sister venue, Perth Concert Hall, was launched under the direction of the Jane Spiers, first CEO of Horsecross Arts. She also began fundraising for the theatre's restoration and major redevelopment for which Richard Murphy, architects, were appointed by the Council in 2008. Demolition of the theatre's 1980s extension began on 19 April 2016. The restoration was carried out by Robertson Group and was completed in September 2017.

== Notable figures ==
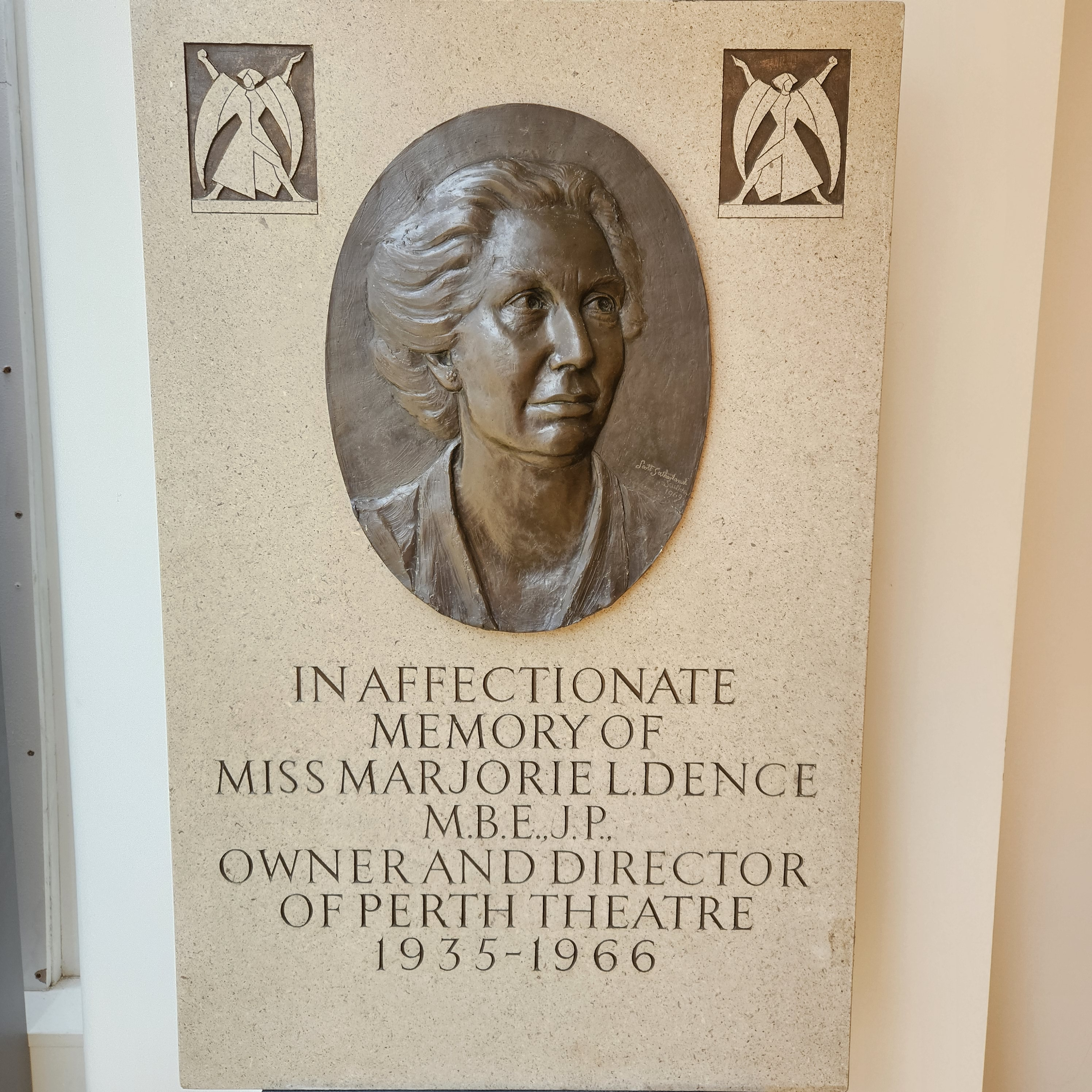
Marjorie Dence Plaque in Perth Theatre hallway

Throughout its history, a number of star acts performed at Perth Theatre, including Bessie Love.

== Perth Youth Theatre ==
Established in 1966 by Brian Howard and Catherine Robins, Perth Youth Theatre was the first theatre-based youth theatre group in Scotland. Perth Youth Theatre has trained young people in acting and stage craft for 50 years. Perth Youth Theatre Alumni included Colin McCredie, Ewan McGregor and Rhod Sharp.

What happened to us there – boys and girls – was profound, and often profoundly funny. In the children's show, the name of which I cannot remember, I played my first custard pie scene with Stuart Cosgrove. It used a lot shaving foam and Stuart usually came off better. We didn't know who we would become, but few of us had doubts that we would become something.

— Rhod Sharp, 2015

== See also ==
- List of listed buildings in Perth, Scotland
