= Boris Pineda =

Salvadoran chess player (1958–2021)

Personal information
- Born: 28 November 1958
- Died: 11 October 2021 (aged 62) San Salvador, El Salvador

Chess career
- Country: El Salvador
- Title: FIDE Master (1998)
- Peak rating: 2320 (January 1998)

Boris Pineda (28 November 1958 – 11 October 2021) was a Salvadoran engineer and chess player who is considered the most successful player in the history of El Salvador. The National Institute of Sports of El Salvador named him "Chess Player of the 20th century".

== Career ==
"Science, art, game or sport? Well, they say that chess is too much of a sport to be a science and too much of a science to be a mere sport. And they are right, there is a systematization of knowledge that allows it to be classified as a science, but it has too much game to be seen as such. Physically, a chess game is like a three hour math test..."

— Boris Pineda describing chess

He won the Salvadoran Chess Championship a record 8 times (1976, 1977, 1978, 1991, 1992, 1996, 1998 and 2003). He was also the only Salvadoran chess player ever to win two medals worldwide: a team gold medal at the Against Chess Olympiad held in Tripoli in 1976, and an individual silver at the 29th Chess Olympiad held in Novi Sad in 1990. He also received the recognition of "Sportsman of the Year" by the Circle of Sport Informers (CID) in 1975, and the " Espiga Dorada" in 1990 and 1994.
