= Ridha Belkadi =

Tunisian chess player (1925–2012)

Personal information
- Born: 1925 Tunis, Tunisia
- Died: December 2012 (aged 87)

Chess career
- Country: Tunisia
- Title: International Master (1974)
- Peak rating: 2350 (January 1975)

Ridha Belkadi (Arabic: رضا بلكادي; 1925-2012) was a Tunisian chess International Master (IM, 1974).

== Chess career ==
From the beginning of 1960s to the beginning of 1980s, Ridha Belkadi was one of the leading Tunisian chess players. He was the number 1 player prior to emergence of Slim Bouazis.

Belkadi played for Tunisia in the Chess Olympiads:

- In 1960, at first board in the 14th Chess Olympiad in Leipzig (+3, =2, -4),
- In 1962, at first board in the 15th Chess Olympiad in Varna (+8, =5, -4),
- In 1966, at first board in the 17th Chess Olympiad in Havana (+8, =5, -5),
- In 1968, at first board in the 18th Chess Olympiad in Lugano (+8, =5, -5),
- In 1970, at second board in the 19th Chess Olympiad in Siegen (+6, =5, -7),
- In 1972, at first board in the 20th Chess Olympiad in Skopje (+6, =10, -5),
- In 1974, at second board in the 21st Chess Olympiad in Nice (+4, =9, -2),
- In 1978, at second board in the 23rd Chess Olympiad in Buenos Aires (+5, =4, -3),
- In 1980, at second board in the 24th Chess Olympiad in La Valletta (+2, =4, -4).

Ridha Belkadi played for Tunisia in the European Team Chess Championship preliminaries:

- In 1973, at second board in the 5th European Team Chess Championship preliminaries (+0, =1, -1).

In 1976 in Tripoli Belkadi played for Tunisia and won team silver medal in the unofficial Chess Olympiad.

Belkadi was awarded the FIDE International Master (IM) title in 1974, and International Arbiter (IA) title in 1982.
