= Marjorie Korringa =

Igneous petrologist, volcanologist, and structural geologist

Marjorie Kitchel Korringa (née Whallon; 8 August 1943 - 8 September 1974) was an igneous petrologist, volcanologist, and structural geologist. She is chiefly known for her research on active fault systems as a critical part of decision-making for the location of oil pipelines and nuclear reactors.

== Early life and education ==
Korringa was born on August 8, 1943, in Richmond, Indiana to Robert Edward and Dorothy (Curme) Whallon. She graduated in 1960 from high school in Averill Park, New York. Graduating cum laude, she obtained a Bachelor of Arts in geology from Radcliffe College in Cambridge, Massachusetts in 1964. Later, she worked in the geology department at Harvard University as a laboratory analyst, learning the key tools necessary for petrologic research. In 1972, Korringa received her PhD in geology from Stanford University. Her dissertation focused on the volcanic occurrences involved in the linear vent region of an ash-flow sheet in Nevada called Soldier Meadow Tuff.

== Career and research ==
She began her career at the University of Nevada as a geological consultant to Professor David B. Slemmons, who conducted research in earthquake geology and engineering. Slemmons and Korringa discovered two large ash-flow sheets in the Eureka Valley Tuff near Bridgeport, California, along with a smaller overlying unit of ash-flow tuff. This finding confirmed the suggested correlation of the volcanic rock quartz latite in this area.

At the University of Nevada, she also worked with Donald C. Noble regarding volcanic petrology in North America and Peru. This is where her interest in active faults and landslides started. In 1970, Noble, Korringa, and other colleagues evaluated mafic, andesitic, and silicic lavas, and ash-flow and air-fall tuff in northwestern Nevada. Through potassium-argon dating, they found that the majority of the volcanic eruptions had occurred between 14.5 and 16 million years ago. They also determined the oldest ash-flow unit in the area to be about 24 million years old. By finding these ages, they were able to establish that the volcanism took place in the Miocene Epoch. In Mono County, California, they evaluated strontium and lead isotopic data, finding that the obsidian from Glass Mountain was the result of fractional crystallization. Noble and Korringa continued their research by studying calcium variations in whole-rock and glass samples from Quaternary lavas in Crater Lake, Oregon.

Korringa joined Woodward-Clyde Consultants, a civil, geotechnical and environmental engineering and construction firm, where she researched active faulting. In the Alyeska fault study for the Trans-Alaska Pipeline System, she was the central, leading participant. She co-authored numerous reports for the company, her most noteworthy being the Alyeska fault study's "Basis for Pipeline Design for Active-Fault Crossings for the Trans-Alaska Pipeline." In the two years that Marjorie worked with Woodward-Clyde Consultants, she became chairman of the Geology-Seismology-Geophysics Planning Committee. She was headed for significant managerial responsibility, as she "influenced almost every phase of their geologic practice." She was also part of the Auditing Committee of the Seismological Society of America.

By the time of her death in 1974, she had a principal role in designing the extent of evaluation, along with the photo geological interpretation of imagery, for three projects at Woodward-Clyde: the study of a nuclear-reactor project in California, a nuclear-reactor siting in Italy, and the Managua earthquake and its faults for the Nicaraguan government.

== Personal life ==
Korringa was fond of the outdoors and often enjoyed backpacking, hiking, and camping. She was a member of the environmental organization the Sierra Club and attempted to preserve numerous natural areas. She was especially active in the Sierra Club's efforts to establish a Redwood National Park. At a hearing in 1986 in Crescent City, California, she advocated for the establishment of the park. She encouraged the committee to increase the maximum acreage for the park, and spoke of the ecological, economic, and recreational benefits of its formation for future generations. She stressed that if the committee did not act soon to protect the land, a significant amount of it would quickly be logged and destroyed. After the lobbying of Congress, the bill creating Redwood National Park, now called Redwood National and State Parks, was signed on October 2, 1968, by President Lyndon Johnson.

Korringa was married twice, and was single at the time of her death.

== Death ==
On September 8, 1974, Korringa was aboard TWA Flight 841 that crashed between Athens and Rome, into the Ionian Sea. The detonation of a hidden bomb on board brought the plane down about half an hour after leaving Athens, as determined by the National Transportation Safety Board. She had presented a paper on active faults at the International Symposium on Recent Crustal Movements in Zurich a few days prior. She had paid a brief visit to her parents, who lived on Crete, before taking the TWA flight for Rome, where she was to take part in a nuclear-reactor siting study for the Italian government. Her body was never recovered.

== Legacy ==
A year after Korringa's death, The Marjorie K. Korringa Scholarship Fund was established at Stanford University. The scholarship's purpose was to promote further geologic learning and interest in her most prominent fields of research, namely volcanic petrology and active fault systems. The funding allowed the next generation of women going into both undergraduate and graduate geology programs to extend and build upon Korringa's initial studies.

Along with Korringa's applied geologic efforts that enhanced Woodward-Clyde's productivity and economic results, her extensive philosophical and theoretical evaluations, in the form of laboratory and field studies, contributed to the growth of academic geology.

== Selected publications ==
Publications as selected in Korringa's memorial.

Author	Title	Year	Journal, volume, pages
Noble, D.C., Drake, J.C., Whallon, M.K.	Some preliminary observations on compositional variations within the pumice- and scoria-flow deposits of Mount Mazama	1969	Proceedings of the Andesite Conference; Portland, Oregon Dept. Geology and Mineral Industries. Bull. 65, p. 157-164
Korringa, M.K., Noble, D.C.	Ash-flow eruption from a linear vent area without caldera collapse	1970	Geological Society of America Abstracts with Programs, v. 2, no. 2, p. 108-109
Korringa, M.K., Noble, D.C.	Feldspar-liquid partition coefficients for Sr and Ba based on a Rayleigh fractionation model	1970	Geological Society of America Abstracts with Programs, v. 2, no. 7, p. 598-599
Noble, D.C., McKee, E.H., Smith, J.G., Korringa, M.K.	Stratigraphy and geochronology of Miocene volcanic rocks in northwestern Nevada	1970	U.S. Geological Survey Professional Paper 700-D, p. D23-D32
Korringa, M.K., Noble, D.C.	Distribution of Sr and Ba between natural feldspar and igneous melt	1971	Earth and Planetary Science Letters, v. 11, p. 147-151
Noble, D.C., Korringa, M.K., Hafety, Joseph.	Distribution of calcium between alkali feldspar and glass in some highly differentiated silicic volcanic rocks	1971	American Mineralogist, v. 56, p. 2088-2097
Korringa, M.K.	Vent area of the Soldier Meadow Tuff, an ash-flow sheet in northwestern Nevada [PhD dissertation]	1972	Stanford University, 105 p. (available on microfilm)
Korringa, M.K., Noble, D.C.	Genetic significance of chemical, isotopic, and petrographic features of some peralkaline salic rocks from the island of Pantelleria	1972	Earth and Planetary Science Letters, v. 17, p. 258-262, doi:10.1016/0012-821X(72)90284-1
Korringa, M.K.	Linear vent area of the Soldier Meadow tuff, and ash-flow sheet in northwestern Nevada	1973	[https://doi.org/10.1130/0016-7606(1973)84<3849:LVAOTS>2.0.CO;2 Geological Society of America Bulletin, v. 84, no. 12, p. 3489-3866]
Noble, D.C., Hedge, C.E., McKee, E.H., Korringa, M.K.	Reconnaissance study of the strontium isotopic composition of Cenozoic volcanic rocks in the northwestern Great Basin	1973	[https://doi.org/10.1130/0016-7606(1973)84<1393:RSOTSI>2.0.CO;2 Geological Society of America Bulletin, v. 84, no. 4, p. 1393-1406]
Noble, D.C., Slemmons, D.B., Korringa, M.K., Dickinson, W.R., Al-Rawi, Yehya, McKee, E.H.	Eureka Valley Tuff, east-central California and adjacent Nevada	1974	[https://doi.org/10.1130/0091-7613(1974)2<139:EVTECA>2.0.CO;2 Geology, v. 2, no. 3, p. 139-142]
Brogan, G.E., Cluff, L.S., Korringa, M.K., Slemmons, D.B.	Active faults of Alaska	1974	Geological Society of America Abstracts with Programs, v. 6, no. 7, p. 959

== See also ==
- Women in geology
