= Marjorie Schwarzer =

American museologist

Marjorie Schwarzer (born 1957) is an American museum educator and author of the 2020 museum textbook Riches, Rivals and Radicals: A History of Museums in the United States. She is a prolific writer on issues impacting museums, especially those in the United States but also in the United Arab Emirates and other developing nations. She has authored numerous reviews, articles and books about museums. From 1996 to 2011, she was professor and chair of Museum Studies at John F. Kennedy University, California and she taught at University of San Francisco from 2012 to 2020. The first edition of Riches, Rivals and Radicals: 100 Years of the Museum in America was published in 2006 to celebrate the 100th anniversary of the American Alliance of Museums. The book was the basis for public television show of the same title.

== Early life ==
Marjorie Schwarzer was born in 1957 in Boston. She spent her early years in Buffalo, New York. After graduating from Washington University in St. Louis in 1978 with a degree in art history and French, Schwarzer earned her MBA at University of California, Berkeley and began her museum career. After a brief stint at the San Francisco Museum of Modern Art, she served as associate director of Development at Boston Children's Museum and Director of Education at Chicago Children's Museum before returning to Northern California in 1995 where she served as professor and chair of the Museum Studies department at John F. Kennedy University until she joined the University of San Francisco to help found a graduate museum studies program with a focus on social justice.

In 2003, she was awarded the Harry Morrison Award for Outstanding Teaching at JFKU. In 2008 she accepted the CAMMY award on behalf of JFKU from the California Association of Museums for leadership in the museum field, and in 2018, she was awarded a lifetime achievement award from the Western Museums Association.

== Personal life ==
She lives in Oakland, California with her husband, the architectural historian Mitchell Schwarzer.

== Selected publications ==
- Riches, Rivals and Radicals: 100 Years of Museums in America (Washington, D.C.: American Association of Museums, 2006). Winner, Excel Award (Silver) for Professional Book of the Year. Adapted for nationally televised public television special of same title. (2007 Platinum Aurora Award for best educational television documentary of the year). Third edition, 2020.
- What Students Need to Know: Graduate Training in Museum Studies (Washington, D.C.: American Association of Museums, 2001).
- "Museum Studies at a Crossroads", Museum, January/February 2012.
- "Soft Diplomacy in the United Arab Emirates", Museum, July/August 2011.
- "Lessons from the Great Depression", Museum, May/June 2009.
- "Shotgun Wedding: The new California Academy of Sciences African Hall", exhibition critique (2009), Exhibitionist, Volume 28, no. 1.
- "Museum Studies" and "Museum Careers", (2009) chapters in Encyclopedia of Library Information (Taylor & Francis).
- "Literary Devices: Period Rooms as Fantasy and Archetype", Curator (October 2008)
- "Civic Discourse: Can We Really Talk?"] Museums and Social Issues 2:2 (Fall 2007), co-editor with Judy Koke and Kris Morrissey
- "Broadcasting Dialogue: Citizen Journalism, Public Radio and Museums"], Museums and Social Issues 2:2 (Fall 2007)
- "Gender in the Temple: Women and Leadership in Museums", Museum News 85: 3 (May–June, 2007). Revised and reprinted in Gender and Museums, ed. Amy Levine, Routledge
- "Looking Back: 11 Touchpoint Exhibitions of the 20th Century", Exhibitionist (April 2006).
- "Turnover at the Top: Are Directors Burning Out?" Museum News 81:3 (May–June 2002)
- "Art and Gadgetry: The Future of the Museum Visit" Museum News 80:4 (July–August 2001)
- "Now Boarding: Airport Museums and the Global Audience" Museum News 80:3 (May–June 2001)
- "Decoding the Tech Museum of Innovation", Exhibitionist (journal of National Association of Museum Exhibitors) (Spring 2000), .
- "The Mouse in the Museum: Technology Training and Museum Studies Programs", Spectra 26 (Journal of Museum Computer Network) (Summer 1999), 18–19.
- "Schizophrenic Agora: Mission, Market and the Multi-tasking Museum," Museum News 78 (November–December 1999), 40–47.
- "Dealing with Prejudice and Discrimination in a Museum Environment", in Gail Lord and Barry Lord, Museum Management Handbook, (London: Stationery Office, 1997, reprinted 2002).
- "Helping Visitors in Potent Exhibits", Hand-to-Hand 8.1 (Spring 1994).
