= Marjorie Liddy =

Australian indigenous elder and artist

- Born: 17 October 1932; Tiwi Islands, Northern Territory, Australia
- Died: 23 August 2016 (aged 83)
- Other names: Aunty Marjorie
- Occupations: artist, indigenous elder
- Known for: Design of image used for World Youth Day 2008

Marjorie Liddy (17 October 1932 – 23 August 2016) was an Indigenous Australian elder and artist from the Tiwi Islands in the Northern Territory. She designed the image approved by the Vatican that became the international symbol of World Youth Day 2008.

== Early life and education ==
Marjorie Dunn Liddy was born on 17 October 1932. She was a Tiwi Islands woman who was raised by Catholic nuns on the Garden Point Mission, Pirlangimpi on Melville Island in the Northern Territory. The mission had been founded in 1941 by the Roman Catholic Missionaries of the Sacred Heart as a home for mixed-blood children, including those stolen from their indigenous families in other parts of the Northern Territory.

== Career ==
Liddy designed the image that was widely used in Pope Benedict XVI's visit to World Youth Day 2008 in Sydney. Commonly known as Marjorie's Bird, the image was used on the back of chasubles worn at the Papal Mass. Liddy herself called the image "The Day the Holy Spirit Visited Marjorie and Her People", with "her people" intended to mean all the people of Australia. Liddy was part of a group of indigenous women who formed a guard of honour for the Pope at World Youth Day. Liddy had not painted before she created the image, which was a white dot bird on a navy background. She told the story of being touched by the Holy Spirit in an interview on Melbourne Community Television's "Spirit of Life" program. Returning from fishing with her son, an arrangement of the stars provided the inspiration for the image. Archbishop Christopher Prowse wrote that after what he believes was a kind of apparition, Liddy was encouraged to paint what she saw in the night sky by her priest and bishop.

In 2006, Liddy provided illustrations for a book authored by Denise Kelly.

In 2012, a photograph titled "Aunty Marjorie Liddy" by Fiona Basile was the winner of the Best Original Photograph, awarded by the Australasian Religious Press.

== Personal life ==
Liddy was the mother of 12 children. She died on 23 August 2016. She was on her way to the Tiwi Islands after having attended an ordination service in Melbourne.
