= Marjorie Curry Woods =

American historian of English literature

Marjorie Curry Woods is an American historian of English literature, currently the Jane and Roland Blumberg Centennial Professor at and University Distinguished Teaching Professor at University of Texas at Austin.
