= Marjorie L. Harth =

American art historian

Marjorie L. Harth is an American art historian whose research interests include 19th-century French art and museum studies. She is an emeritus art history professor at Pomona College in Claremont, California, and was the director of the Pomona College Museum of Art from 1981 to 2004.

== Early life ==
Harth attended Smith College before earning a doctorate at the University of Michigan.

== Career ==
Harth was the director of the Pomona College Museum of Art at Pomona College from 1981 to 2004. During her tenure, the museum significantly expanded its operations, including renaming itself from a gallery to a museum in 2001. In 2003, her chair was endowed and named the Herbert S. Rempel Directorship.
