= Marjorie O'Connell =

American palaeontologist

Marjorie O'Connell Shearon
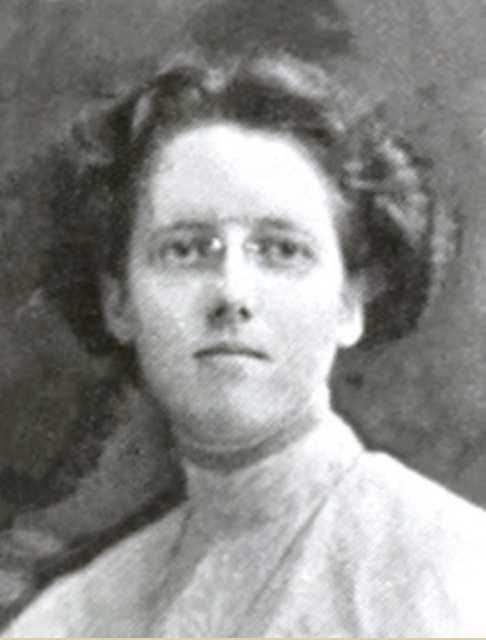
- Born: August 15, 1890; Newark, New Jersey
- Died: 1974 (aged 83–84); Washington, D.C.
- Education: Columbia University
- Occupation: Paleontologist

Marjorie O'Connell Shearon (August 15, 1890 – 1974) was a palaeontologist from Newark, New Jersey. She earned a master's degree and a PhD from Columbia University. She wrote numerous scientific articles and named various species of ammonite fossils as Marjorie O'Connell, her maiden name before she married William Shearon in 1927.

== Early life and education ==
O'Connell was born in Newark, New Jersey on August 15, 1890. Her family moved to New York City when she was an infant, where she attended the Ethical Culture Fieldston School on scholarship. After 15 years, she graduated in 1908 at the age of 17. O'Connell went on to attend Barnard College, also on scholarship. At the age of 22, she went to Columbia University to study paleontology for her graduate degree. She received her Master's in 1912 and her PhD in 1916 where she wrote her dissertation on The Habitat of the Eurypterida, a species of sea scorpions. She acted as curator in Paleontology at Columbia University between 1914 and 1916, where she lectured to graduate students. O'Connell was awarded a $1,000 Sarah Berliner Fellowship in Science for one year post-doctoral research at the American Museum of Natural History. Over the years, she held both volunteer and paid positions.

== Personal life ==
The summer following her freshman year, she began an affair with her geology professor, Amadeus Grabau that would continue throughout her graduate studies and for two years after. Grabau promised that he would leave his estranged wife, writer Mary Antin, and marry Marjorie when she finished her doctorate. Upon discovering that he was still visiting Antin and reluctant to divorce, Marjorie ended the affair in 1918 and Grabau left for China in the fall of 1920. In her later life, she wrote about the love she had for Grabau and how she regretted not marrying him and going to China with him.

In 1918, she met Barnum Brown through the American Museum of Natural History. Shearon worked on the ammonite fossils that he brought back from Cuba. Brown was a big support to her during her breakup with Grabau, and she wrote numerous letters to him in 1920 that were mostly about her daily life and work.

By 1922 at age 32, her interests in palaeontology were declining and she left her position with the museum following a dispute about an entry in Encyclopædia Britannica. Marjorie began a solo hike cross-country from New York City to St. Louis. She would return to New York in 1924.

In 1923, she met William Shearon and worked with him in real estate. They would marry in 1927. He left his wife for her; however, he did not want any children as he already had three. They later bought a house and moved to Long Island, New York.

Following her husband's death in 1960, Marjorie started an affair with Rufus B. Robins, whom she knew from her work with the American Medical Association. Her letters to him, along with those sent to Barnum Brown, offered some of the only insight into her relationship with Grabau. All of her writing appears to allude to Marjorie having feelings for both Brown and Robins.

== Fossils research ==
O'Connell named multiple fossils during her time in the field of paleontology.

- Horn coral genus Siphonophrentis (1914)
- Foraminifera species Orbitoides kempi (1915)
- Ammonite species Perisphinctes cubanensis (1920)
- Ammonite species Perisphinctes delatorii (1920)
- Ammonite species Perisphinctes plicatiloides (1920)
- Ammonite species Ochetoceras canaliculatum burckhardti (1920)
- Ammonite species Aptychus cristobalensis (1921)
- Ammonite species Aptychus cubanensis (1921)
- Ammonite species Aptychus pimientensis (1921)
- Ammonite species Ochetoceras vicente dentatum (1922)

== Scientific publications ==
- Distribution and Occurrence of the Eurypterids, which appeared in The Bulletin of the Geological Society of America (1913),
- Revision of the Genus Zaphrentis, appearing in the Annuals of New York Academy of Science (1914)
- Description of Some New Siluric Gastropods, appearing in the Bulletin of Buffalo Society of Natural Sciences (1914)
- The Habitat of Eurypterida, appearing in The Bulletin of the Buffalo Society of Natural Sciences (1916)

She also wrote two papers published in the Bulletin of the American Museum of Natural History:

- The Jurassic Ammonite Fauna of Cuba (1920).
- Phylogeny of the Ammonite Genus Ochetoceras (1922).

O'Connell also wrote New species of ammonite opercula from the Mesozoic rocks of Cuba (1921) using specimens collected by Barnum Brown and wrote Correlation of Jurassic Formations of Western Cuba (1922) with Brown.

O'Connell was a frequent collaborator on articles with others, often Amadeus W. Grabau. Works by Grabau that Shearon contributed to include:

- Principles of Stratigraphy (1913),
- Were the graphite shales, as a rule, deep or shallow water deposits (1917),
- A Textbook of Geology Part I General Geology (1920),
- A Textbook of Geology Part II General Geology (1921).

O'Connell also contributed to The Mayari Iron-Ore Deposits with J.F. Kemp.

== Life after ending her palaeontology career ==
In 1924, she moved to New York and worked for Macy's Depositors' Account Department before resigning in 1929 following the stock market crash. She worked for the New York Opera Comique, Inc. until 1934 when the Great Depression forced them to close. Her experience working various jobs continued with positions at the State Welfare Department, the Emergency Relief Bureau, and when she moved to Washington, D.C., O'Connell began working with the WPA Bureau of Research & Statistics, then the Social Security Board's new Bureau of Research & Statistics. Marjorie was employed here from 1936 until 1941 when she resigned, citing ideological differences due to what she deemed a "socialist" movement to nationalize medicine in the United States. She started working for the Public Health Service until resigning in 1945 due to the same ideological differences. Her work against universal health insurance continued nationwide and internationally. She published a weekly newsletter American Medicine and the Political Scene, later named Challenge to Socialism from 1947 until 1966.

In 1967, she published William J. Cohen: The Pursuit of Power. One of her last notable efforts within politics at this time involved her testimony against Abe Fortas during his Supreme Court confirmation hearings, where she accused him of communist ties.
