= Marjorie Ruth Dilley =

American political scientist (1903–1989)

- Born: January 26, 1903; Roseville, Illinois
- Died: October 28, 1989 (aged 86)
- Education: University of Colorado Boulder; University of Washington
- Awards: King's Medal for Service in the Cause of Freedom
- Scientific career
- Fields: Political science
- Workplaces: College of Puget Sound; Connecticut College

Marjorie Ruth Dilley (January 26, 1903 – October 28, 1989) was an American political scientist. She was a professor of government at Connecticut College from 1935 until 1969. She was the inaugural chair of the department of government at Connecticut College. Her research focused on the colonial politics and history of East Africa.

== Education and positions ==
Dilley was born on January 26, 1903, in Roseville, Illinois. She attended the University of Colorado Boulder, where she completed an A.B. degree in 1923. After graduating, she lived in New Mexico and Colorado, working as a high school teacher in both states. She then attended graduate school at the University of Washington, completing an M.A. degree in 1928, and a PhD in 1934. In the 1932–1933 school year, Dilley studied at the London School of Economics with Harold Laski and Bronislaw Malinowski, where she was classmates with Jomo Kenyatta. Her PhD dissertation was entitled British policy in Kenya Colony.

From 1930 to 1932, Dilley was a member of the faculty at the College of Puget Sound. In 1935, Dilley joined the department of history and government at Connecticut College. When the government department became a separate department in 1946, Dilley became the chair of it. She was a visiting professor twice at Makerere University; in the 1958–1959 school year she was the first in Smith-Mundt Visiting Professor of Government there, and in 1962–1963 she was a Fulbright lecturer. Dilley retired in 1968.

== Work ==
Dilley studied the colonial politics of East Africa, particularly British colonialism in Kenya. In 1937, Dilley published her PhD dissertation thesis in the form of a book, also called British policy in Kenya Colony. The book was republished in 1966. British policy in Kenya Colony described the policy of the British Empire towards Kenya during the period in which Kenya was a colony of Britain, and largely focused on the personalities and behaviors of British settlers in Kenya. For this reason, the book was praised for being one of the first analyses to turn a critical eye towards British colonial activity in East Africa, and was viewed by the Colonial Office as highly critical of their policies, but was also critiqued for eliding and largely omitting the actions and preferences of the Kenyan people. The fact that she wrote the book in England and America without ever visiting Kenya was described both as a benefit and a detriment, leading to a deeply researched volume that also lacked any detailed discussion of the victims of colonization. The book was also particularly noted for making substantial evidence available from the library of the Colonial Office when direct evidence of Britain's colonial activities was lacking, particularly in America.

During World War II, Dilley worked on welfare and relief efforts for the children of Bristol, England, for which she was awarded the King's Medal for Service in the Cause of Freedom by King George VI. Dilley died on October 28, 1989.
