= Marjorie Simpson (architect) =

Australian architect (1924–2003)

Marjorie Constance (White) Simpson (17 June 1924 – 27 January 2003) was an Australian architect, the first female Life Fellow of the Royal Australian Institute of Architects in South Australia, awarded in 1993 for her extensive contribution to architecture.

== Early life ==
Born Marjorie Constance White in New South Wales on 17 June 1924, she was daughter to an architect Charles Arthur Mortimer White, and younger sister to architect, A.G.M. White (b.1914).

In 1941, at the age of 17, she enrolled in the (non-diploma) architectural course at Sydney Technical College. During her 6 years of study she worked on several architectural projects with her mentor Eric M. Nicholls, including a small factory for Coty's Cosmetics, a Manly coffee shop, a baby health clinic and several houses.

== Career ==
Marjorie White became a registered architect in New South Wales in 1949. The same year she married fellow architect Peter Simpson (1924–1992) changing her surname to Simpson. She began working as an architect for the Commonwealth Department of Works in Sydney in 1950.

While working at the Department of Works she moved to Adelaide in 1951 to work on the design and documentation of the Woomera Rocket Range. The project was predicted to last only 6 months but subsequently took four years to complete. In this time Marjorie designed and built a home in Adelaide.

In 1954 the Simpsons travelled overseas, touring Europe by car. They briefly settled in London where Marjorie worked for Sir Thomas Bennett & Son's office from 1955 to 1956.

On her return to Adelaide in 1956 she worked on projects for the S.A. Brewing Company. Simpson became the Director of the Small Homes Service (later the Architects Advisory Service) of South Australia in 1957, putting great effort into resurrecting the Small Homes Service which had been predicted to fail not long before she was elected as Director. The service was intended to promote better design in South Australian housing. She gave regular talks on ABC radio, and wrote articles.

In 1969 Simpson and Simpson architectural firm was formed and she remained there as a partner till her retirement in 1989.

== Recognition ==
The Marjorie Simpson Award for Small Project Architecture is awarded as part of the Australian Institute of Architects’ SA Architecture Awards.

The Peter and Marjorie Simpson Collection is held at the Architecture Museum, University of South Australia.
