= Marjorie Dence =

British actress and theatre manager (1901–1966)

Marjorie Dence MBE
- Born: 14 June 1901; Teddington, England
- Died: 23 August 1966 (aged 65); Perth, Scotland
- Education: London
- Occupations: Theatre manager and actor
- Known for: First female theatre owner in Scotland, owner and manager of Perth Theatre

Marjorie Lillian Dence (14 June 1901 – 23 August 1966) was a British actress and the first female theatre manager and owner in Scotland. She owned and managed Perth Theatre from 1934 until her death in 1966. She left the theatre to the city of Perth in her will for the initial outlay of £5000. Dence and her business partner David Steuart founded the Perth Repertory Company, the first professional theatre company led by a woman in Scotland. They also created Scotland's first Theatre Festival. Dence received an MBE in 1952 for Services to the Festival of Britain.

== Early life ==
Dence was born in Teddington on 14 June 1901. Her parents were Annie Eleanor Searle and Ernest Martin Dence (d. 1937) who was a brass-founder and company director.

Dence attended the University of London where she joined the local dramatic society. There she met fellow actor David Steuart, who went on to become her creative and business partner. They were both members of the Lena Ashwell Players.

== Theatre career ==
Dence's management career began when she asked her father to buy the theatre in Perth, after she saw it advertised for £4,000 in The Stage. Dence's parents appointed her as manager and she and David Steuart found another £1,000 to refit the theatre. Dence appointed the new theatre's company and in 1935 they staged their first play The Rose without a Thorn by Clifford Bax. This was followed by 18 plays in weekly repertory.

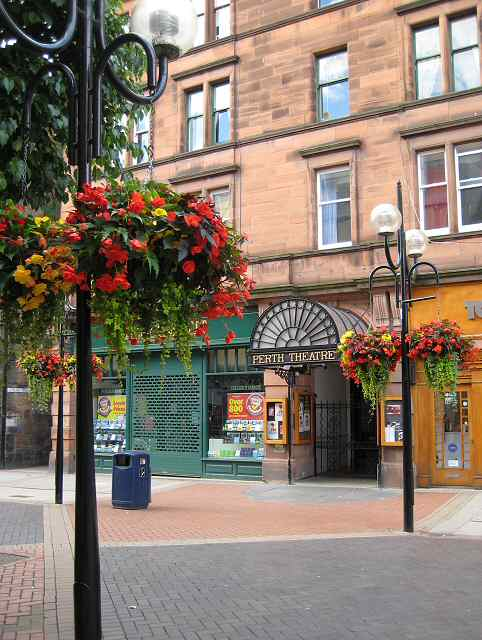
Perth Theatre in 2008

Dence and Steuart created the Perth Repertory Company, which was the first professional theatre company in Scotland led by a woman. In 1937 her father died and she became the owner of the theatre. Finances were slim and the theatre closed for three months in 1937 and 1938 but the following year they created Scotland's first Theatre Festival just before the second world war started.

During World War II the theatre was organised and staffed by the company. The actors lived in the theatre and they undertook all the jobs necessary to keep the theatre running. When the theatre made a profit, those profits were shared equally with the company.

Dence was also a Justice of the Peace. She was made an MBE in 1952 for Services to the Festival of Britain.

== Death and legacy ==
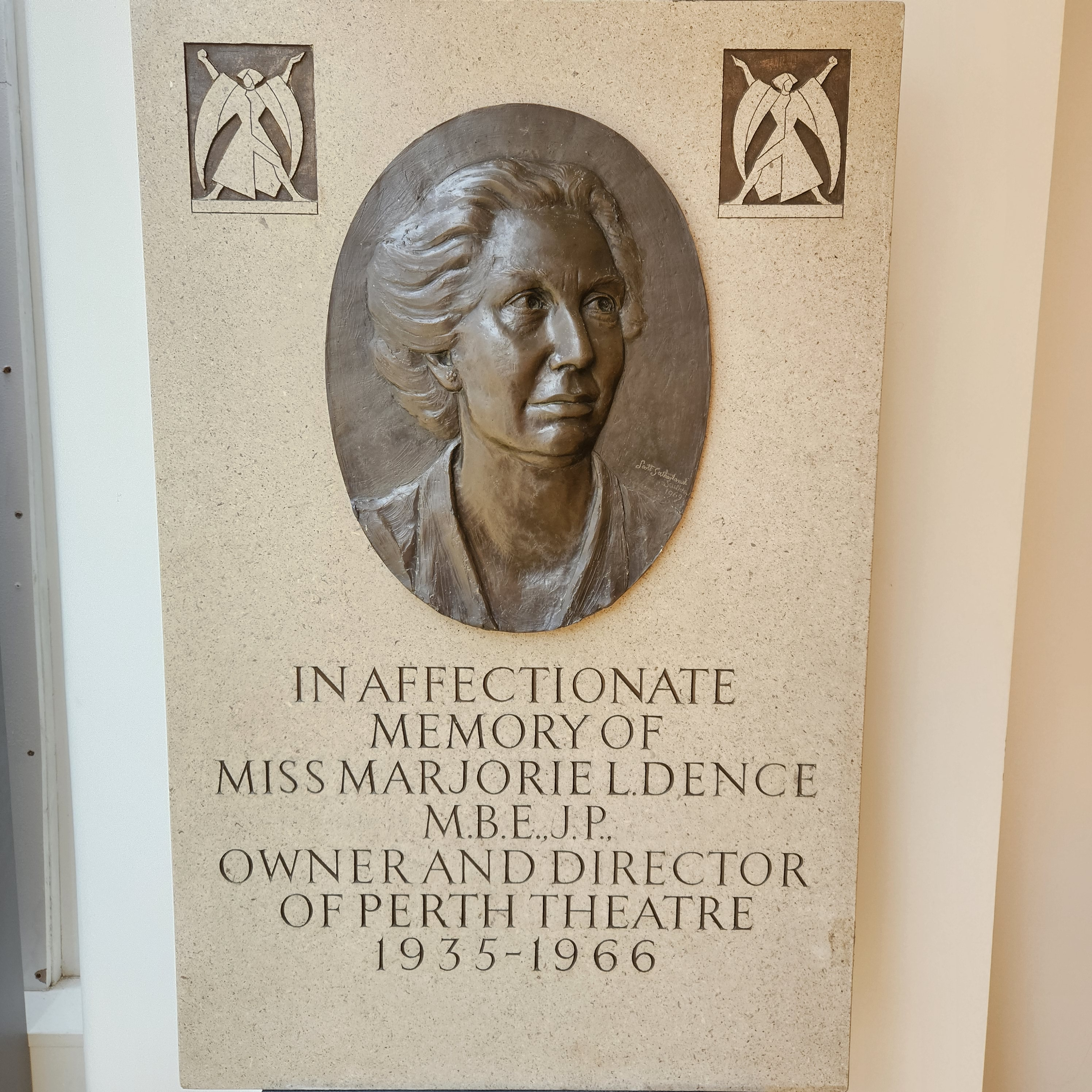
Plaque commemorating Marjorie Dence displayed in Perth Theatre

Dence died in Perth on 23 August 1966. Under the terms of her will the theatre was offered to the city of Perth for the fixed price of £5,000. This was equal to the original investment in the 1930s.

There is a plaque in Perth Theatre's foyer recording Dence's contribution to the city.

In 2022, the Raise the Roof project created a series wire sculptures of notable Perth women, including Dence. The Wire Women project was part of the VisitScotland Year of Stories, with community groups, creatives and cultural organisations sharing the stories of women.

Dence was No 17 of 20 wire sculptures set out in a trail around Perth city centre. The Dence sculpture was situated outside the Theatre's High Street entrance but was subject to vandalism whilst it was sited there.
