= Marjorie Esa =

Inuk artist

- Born: 1934 (age 91–92)

Marjorie Esa (born 1934) is an Inuk artist known for her drawings and stone carvings. She was born in the Nuqsarhaarjuk camp and lives in Baker Lake, Nunavut.

Her work is included in the collections of the Winnipeg Art Gallery the National Gallery of Canada and the Art Gallery of Guelph.
