= Marjorie Woollacott =

American neuroscientist

Marjorie Woollacott is an American neuroscientist, author, and Emeritus Professor of Human Physiology at the University of Oregon. She is known for her interdisciplinary research in neuroscience, motor control, rehabilitation, meditation, and consciousness studies. She served as chair of the Human Physiology Department at the University of Oregon and currently serving as the Research Director for the International Association for Near-Death Studies and President of the Academy for the Advancement of Postmaterialist Sciences.

== Education ==
Woollacott graduated magna cum laude from the University of Southern California, where she was inducted into Phi Beta Kappa. She earned her Ph.D. in neuroscience from the University of Southern California in 1973 and later received a Master of Arts in Asian Studies from the University of Oregon in 2005.

== Academic and research career ==
Woollacott spent over thirty years on the faculty at the University of Oregon, where she became a member of the Institute of Neuroscience. She also held joint academic appointments internationally, including positions at the University of Umeå in Sweden and the National Center for Scientific Research (CNRS) in Marseille, France.

Her personal narrative of spiritual awakening is featured in the archives of the Academy for the Advancement of Postmaterialist Sciences, which documents transcendent experiences reported by scientists.

She has investigated changes in attentional performance and neural networks resulting from mental training practices such as meditation and Tai Chi. She has studied the development of balance and attention in children, including those with motor impairments like cerebral palsy and Down syndrome. Woollacott has also examined age-related decline in balance, with a focus on improving mobility and independence among older adults and patients with neurological conditions such as Parkinson's disease and stroke. Her work includes designing assessment and rehabilitation strategies to enhance postural control and attentional capacity, particularly through the use of integrative therapies.

In addition to her work in neuroscience and rehabilitation, Woollacott has conducted studies on the development of musical performance skills and the effect of internal mental states on physical performance. She is the co-author, with Anne Shumway-Cook, of the widely used textbook Motor Control: Translating Research into Clinical Practice, which is now in its sixth edition as of 2021.

=== Consciousness and Spiritual Research ===
Woollacott has made contributions to the emerging field of consciousness studies. Her 2015 book Infinite Awareness: The Awakening of a Scientific Mind presents a synthesis of her scientific work and personal experiences with meditation and spiritual practice. The book explores non-local consciousness and the interface between Western neuroscience and Eastern philosophical traditions. It has received awards, including the Parapsychological Association Book Award, the Eric Hoffer Book Award, and the Nautilus Book Award.

Her academic writings in this area include collaborations with scholars such as Ben Williams, with whom she co-authored the paper "Conceptual Cognition and Awakening: Insights from Non-dual Śaivism and Neuroscience. This work explores the links between brain activity, language, self-awareness, and expanded states of consciousness, using insights from both neuroscience and the 10th-century Kashmiri philosopher Utpaladeva.

Woollacott's work also focuses on near-death experiences, extra-sensory perception, quantum entanglement, and the role of brain activity in shaping consciousness. She advocates a top-down view of consciousness, suggesting that awareness exists beyond the physical brain and is filtered by neural mechanisms. Her interests also align with panpsychism and postmaterialist models of the mind.

== Awards ==
In 2005, she was named Senior Scholar in Motor Development by the North American Society for the Psychology of Sport and Physical Activity (NASPSPA). In 2009, she received the Distinguished Lecturer Award from the Department of Health Professions at the University of Wisconsin-La Crosse and was invited as a Senior Scientist to the Max Planck Institute for Human Development in Berlin. In 2017, she was awarded the Oen Fellow Award by Luther College in Iowa, where she delivered a public lecture and led class discussions on her book Infinite Awareness.

== Selected publications ==
=== Journals ===
- Zsolnai, Laszlo; Miller, Lisa; Woollacott, Marjorie; Bermudez, Julio (2025-07-09). "Spirituality in Professional Higher Education". Journal of Human Values 09716858251352086. doi:10.1177/09716858251352086. ISSN 0971-6858.
- Woollacott, Marjorie; Weiler, Marina (2025-03-14). "Neural filters to conscious awareness and the phenomena that reduce their impact". International Review of Psychiatry. 37 (2): 174–188. doi:10.1080/09540261.2025.2478907. ISSN 0954-0261. PMID 40627511.
- Barton, Jeb; Woollacott, Marjorie (2025). "Eight insights we've gleaned from enlightened masters". Explore. 21 (1) 103096. doi:10.1016/j.explore.2024.103096. PMID 39689464.
- Woollacott, Marjorie; Shumway-Cook, Anne (2023). "Spiritual awakening and transformation in scientists and academics". Explore. 19 (3): 319–329. doi:10.1016/j.explore.2022.08.016. ISSN 1878-7541. PMID 36100544.
- Woollacott, Marjorie; Roe, Chris A.; Cooper, Callum E.; Lorimer, David; Elsaesser, Evelyn (2022). "Perceptual phenomena associated with spontaneous experiences of after-death communication: Analysis of visual, tactile, auditory and olfactory sensations". Explore. 18 (4): 423–431. doi:10.1016/j.explore.2021.02.006. PMID 33642208.
- Woollacott, Marjorie H.; Kason, Yvonne; Park, Russell D. (2021). "Investigation of the phenomenology, physiology and impact of spiritually transformative experiences – kundalini awakening". Explore. 17 (6): 525–534. doi:10.1016/j.explore.2020.07.005. PMID 32753262.
- Woollacott, Marjorie; Peyton, Bettina (2021). "Verified account of near-death experience in a physician who survived cardiac arrest". Explore. 17 (3): 213–219. doi:10.1016/j.explore.2020.03.005. PMID 32245708.
- Woollacott, Marjorie; Shumway-Cook, Anne (2020). "The Mystical Experience and Its Neural Correlates". Journal of Near-Death Studies. 38 (1): 3–25. doi:10.17514/JNDS-2020-38-1-p3-25 (inactive 3 August 2025). ISSN 0891-4494.
- Schwartz, Gary E.; Woollacott, Marjorie; Schwartz, Stephan A.; Baruss, Imants; Beauregard, Mario; Dossey, Larry; Kafatos, Menas; Miller, Lisa; Mossbridge, Julia; Radin, Dean; Tart, Charles (2018). "The Academy for the Advancement of Postmaterialist Sciences: Integrating Consciousness into Mainstream Science". Explore. 14 (2): 111–113. doi:10.1016/j.explore.2017.12.006. PMID 29475815.
- Woollacott, Marjorie; Shumway-Cook, Anne (2002). "Attention and the control of posture and gait: a review of an emerging area of research". Gait & Posture. 16 (1): 1–14. doi:10.1016/s0966-6362(01)00156-4. ISSN 0966-6362. PMID 12127181.
- Shumway-Cook, A.; Woollacott, M.; Kerns, K. A.; Baldwin, M. (1997-07-01). "The Effects of Two Types of Cognitive Tasks on Postural Stability in Older Adults With and Without a History of Falls". The Journals of Gerontology Series A: Biological Sciences and Medical Sciences. 52A (4): M232–M240. doi:10.1093/gerona/52a.4.m232. ISSN 1079-5006. PMID 9224435.

=== Books ===
- Woollacott, Marjorie; Lorimer, David; Schwartz, Gary E., eds. (2024). The playful universe: synchronicity and the nature of consciousness. Postmaterialist Sciences series. Battle Ground, WA: AAPS Press. ISBN 978-1-7354491-7-3.
- Woollacott, Marjorie (2015). Infinite Awareness: The Awakening of a Scientific Mind. Pim van Lommel. Lanham, MD: Rowman & Littlefield Publishers. ISBN 978-1-4422-5033-8.
- Shumway-Cook, Anne; Woollacott, Marjorie H. (2007). Motor control: translating research into clinical practice (3rd ed.). Philadelphia: Lippincott Williams & Wilkins. ISBN 978-0-7817-6691-3.
- Woollacott, Marjorie H.; Shumway-Cook, Anne, eds. (1989). Development of posture and gait across the life span. Growth, motor development, and physical activity across the life span (1st ed.). Columbia, S.C: University of South Carolina Press. ISBN 978-0-87249-629-3.
- Woollacott, Marjorie H. (2018-08-06), "Meditation, Neurobiological Changes, Genes, and Health", Nutrition and Integrative Medicine, Boca Raton : Taylor & Francis, 2018.: CRC Press, pp. 423–437, doi:10.1201/9781315153155-17, ISBN 978-1-315-15315-5
