= Marjorie Wright =

Marjorie Wright may refer to:

- Margie Ann Wright (born December 28, 1952), a college softball coach
- Marjorie Wright (architect) (died 1949), architect in Syracuse, New York, and daughter of architect Gordon Wright
