= Marjorie Herrera =

Salvadoran chess player (born 2001)

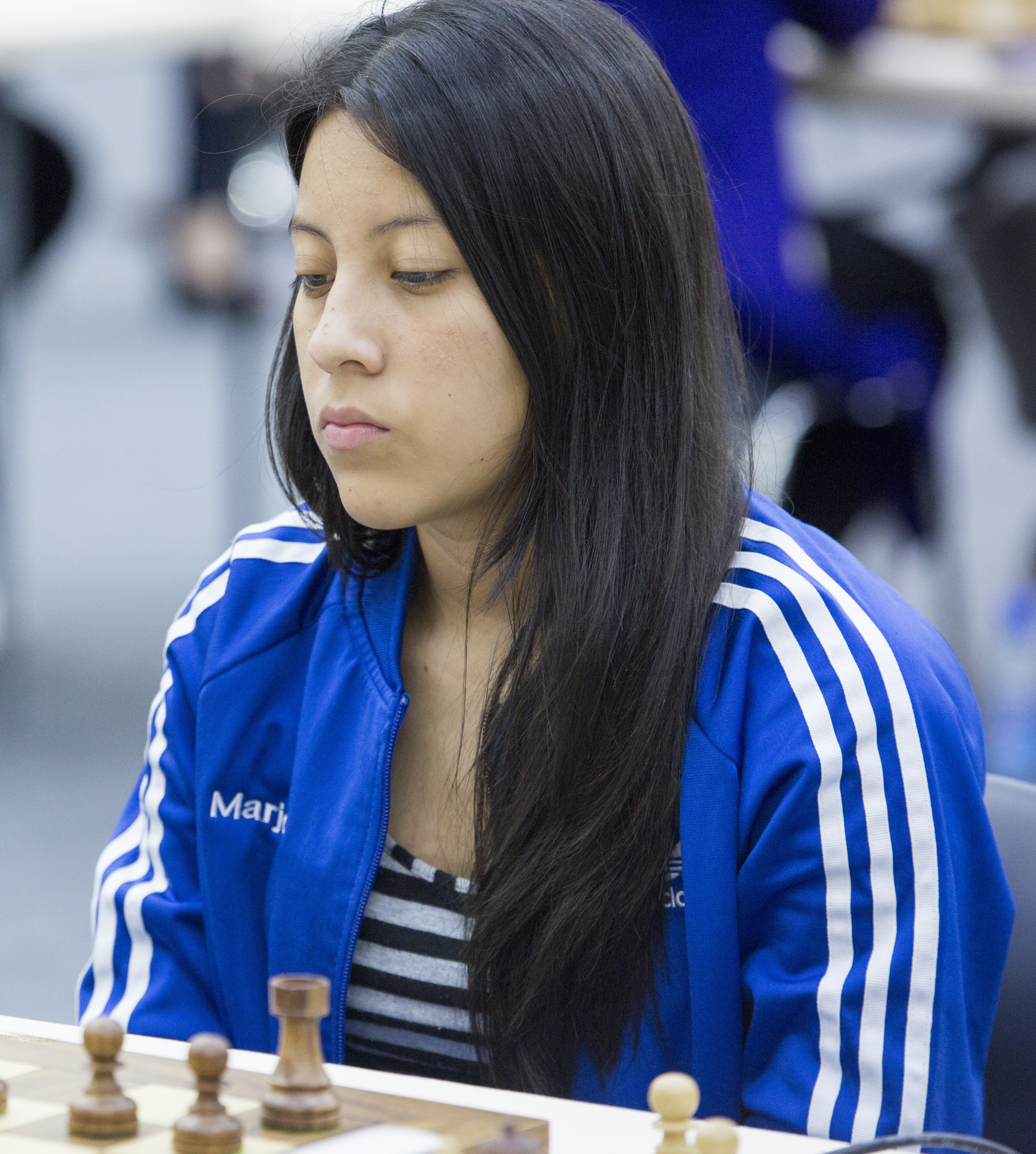
- Herrera at the 42nd Chess Olympiad, 2016

Personal information
- Born: Marjorie Armida Herrera Pérez; 22 January 2001 (age 25) San Salvador, El Salvador

Chess career
- Country: El Salvador
- Title: Woman Candidate Master (2016)
- FIDE rating: 1740 (March 2023)
- Peak rating: 1891 (September 2019)

Marjorie Armida Herrera Pérez (born 22 January 2001) is a Salvadoran chess player. She competed in the 42nd Chess Olympiad in 2016, held in Baku, at the age of 15. She has won the Salvadoran Women's Chess Championship twice (2016 and 2019).

== Awards ==
- Notable Athlete from El Salvador, Awarded by the Legislative Assembly of El Salvador (Outstanding career, 2014)
