= Marjorie Siksi'naaq Tutannuaq =

Inuk artist (1917–1989)

- Born: 1917
- Died: 1989 (aged 71–72)
- Known for: Printmaking
- Children: Elizabeth Kugmucheak Alooq

Marjorie Siksi'naaq Tutannuaq (1917–1989) was an Inuk artist who lived in Baker Lake, Nunavut (in the Northwest Territories during her lifetime).

Her work is included in the collections of the National Gallery of Canada and the Winnipeg Art Gallery.

Her daughter, Elizabeth Kugmucheak Alooq (born 1943), is a Baker Lake artist who creates drawings and prints.
