= Against Chess Olympiad =

International chess competition

- Dates run: 24 October – 15 November 1976
- Competitors
- Teams: 38 (Open)
- Nations: 34 (Open)
- Venue: Beach Hotel Tripoli
- Location: Tripoli, Libya

Team medalists
- Open: (gold) El Salvador; (silver) Tunisia; (bronze) Pakistan

The Against Chess Olympiad (Arabic: الأولمبياد الضَاد الشطرنج al-Awlambayād aḍ-ḍādi ash-Shatranji) was arranged as an alternative to the official 22nd Chess Olympiad, held in Haifa, Israel, almost simultaneously. This unofficial Olympiad took place in Tripoli, Libyan Arab Republic from October 24 to November 15, 1976.

== Background ==
When FIDE decided to award the hosting of the 1976 Olympiad to Israel, it caused considerable controversy, as several countries, including the Soviet Union and all of the Arab nations, did not recognize the state of Israel. After FIDE refused to change the venue, the Soviet team boycotted the tournament in Haifa in protest, as did all the Soviet satellite states in the Eastern Bloc, and the Arab member nations of FIDE.

The Arab nations held their own Olympiad in Tripoli at the same time as the official one. In the promotion material, this event was called the Against Israel Olympiad, but it has later become known by the politically less volatile name Against Chess Olympiad. This implies that the tournament was against chess itself, which is not correct; the intended meaning was Chess Anti-Olympiad (analogous to antipope).

While the unofficial Tripoli Olympiad was a highly charged political event, the actual chess played was on quite a different level. None of the major chess nations, Eastern or Western, came to Libya, meaning the field consisted of the Arab states, a number of minor chess nations, and some that were not members of FIDE at the time. No Grandmasters were present, and very few International Masters attended.

While most Arab countries and some other countries from around the world participated in the event, the Soviet Union and its allies did not despite also boycotting the FIDE-organised Olympiad. The Philippines, Italy, and Uruguay were the only nations to send teams to both Olympiads, and none of them won any medals at either event.

== Results ==
Thirty-four teams played a 13-round Swiss system tournament. In a somewhat surprising outcome, the completely unknown Salvadoran team, which included 17-year-old talent Boris Pineda, took home the gold medals. Silver and bronze went to Tunisia and Pakistan, respectively.

#	Country	Points	Players
1	El Salvador	38½	A. Grimaldi, R. Grimaldi, Infante, Camacho, Pineda, Velásquez
2	Tunisia	36	IM Bouaziz, IM Belkadi, Drira, Sbia
3	Pakistan	34½	IM Farooqi, Ali, Ahmad, Mirza, Mohiuddin, Mazhar Hussain

#	Country	Points
4	Iraq	33½
5	Italy	32½
6	Turkey	32½
7	Afghanistan	29½
8	Nicaragua	27½
9	Panama	27½
10	Bangladesh	27
11	Sri Lanka	27
12	Portugal	27
13	Algeria	26½
14	Morocco	26½
15	Philippines	26½
16	Kenya	26
17	Uruguay	26
18	South Yemen	26
19	Trinidad and Tobago	25½
20	Malta	25½
21	North Yemen	25½
22	Madagascar	25½
23	Lebanon	25
24	Libya	24½
25	Jordan	24½
26	Uganda	24½
27	Kuwait	24½
28	United Arab Emirates	20½
29	Mauritius	20
30	Palestine	18½
31	Mauritania	18½
32	Gambia	18
33	Oman	18
34	Somalia	7

== See also ==
- 22nd Chess Olympiad (Haifa 1976)
