= Marjorie Van de Water =

American sociologist (1900–1962)

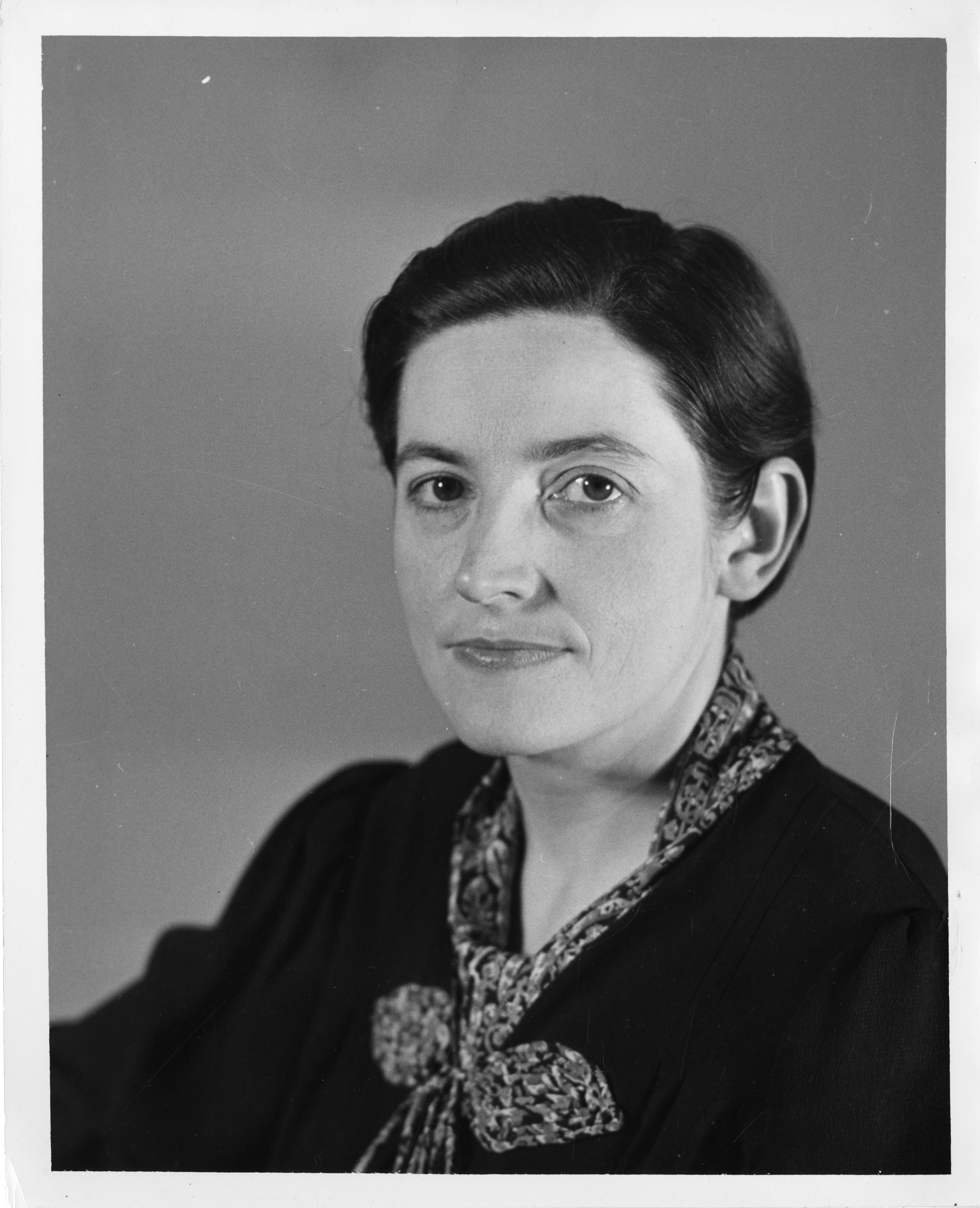
- Born: 1900
- Died: August 2, 1962 (aged 61–62)
- Citizenship: American
- Occupations: Writer, journalist

Marjorie Van de Water (1900 – August 2, 1962) was an American writer and journalist focusing on the advances in psychology and sociology. She wrote for The Daytona Beach News-Journal as well as the Science Service among many publications. She won several journalism awards.

== Early life ==
Before joining Science Service, Van de Water's interests had vacillated between work in science and writing. When she was a teenager, a local newspaper accepted and printed her first news stories. Despite this early success, her interest in writing was initially "eclipsed by a thirst for scientific work." She worked for two years in the laboratories of the National Bureau of Standards and then at the National Research Council and U.S. Civil Service Commission, where she developed psychological tests and worked on related research projects about personality or intelligence. One project, for example, involved the creation of a standardized National Intelligence Test for school children. Eventually, Van de Water returned to writing, first through editorial work for an educational magazine and then as a free-lance writer. When she was hired as a full-time staff member at Science Service in November 1929, she found an opportunity to pursue both of her major interests.

== Contributions ==
Van de Water attended nearly all meetings of the American Psychological Association from 1931 onward as well as many regional psychology conferences. She frequently reported on new developments in psychology, such as research on personality and the role of "social stimulation" in individual development.

She also made efforts to raise awareness of the use of psychology knowledge, particularly in wartime. In this effort, she co-edited "Psychology for the Fighting Man (1943) and Psychology for the Returning Serviceman (1945). The circulation for Fighting Man was 500,000, a wartime best seller. During World War II, she wrote numerous daily press pieces on similar topics, spoke on the "Adventures in Science" radio program, and prepared a series of six feature articles on "morale protection," arguing that such "psychological armor" was vital to national defense.

== Awards ==
In 1959, the American Psychological Foundation (AFP) honored Van de Water with their Science Writer's Prize "for her career of distinguished popular interpretation of science." Noted in particular was her interpretation of psychology as it related to wartime issues.
