= Marjorie Bonner (19th century actress) =

American actress

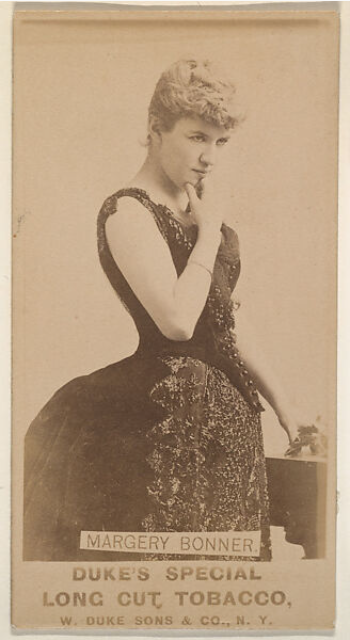
Actress Marjorie Bonner (misspelled "Margery") cigarette card c.1888

Marjorie Bonner (c.1862–14 Nov 1895), the stage name of Catherine F. Goodwin, was a 19th-century American theatre actress. She came from a performing family that included her sisters, the actresses Maude and Myra Goodwin, and her brother, the comedian George Richards.

== Career ==
Bonner's appearance was likened to that of Lily Langtry, and she was called "The New Jersey Lily." She often played second to actress Margaret Mather.

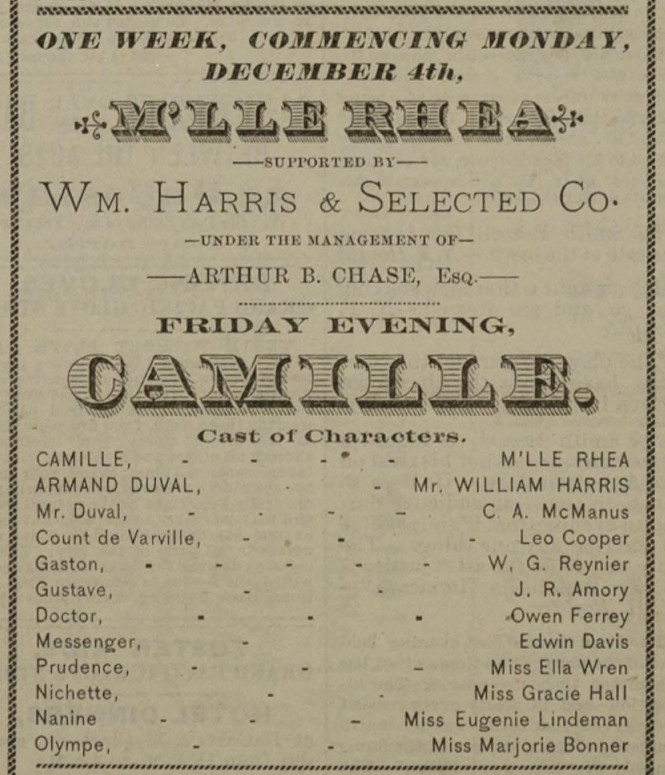
The cast of Camille starring Hortense Rhéa, with Marjorie Bonner as Olympe.

In 1883, she was a member of the Hortense Rhéa company. Monte Cristo was presented by the National Theatre in December. Actor James O'Neill performed the leading role, with Frederic De Belleville playing Noirlier. The female characters were of lesser significance in the play, but were rendered convincingly by Bonner, Eugenie Blair, and Annie Boudinot.

In 1885, Bonner acted the part of Cicely Blaine, the heroine in The Galley Slave, adapted from the writing of Bartley Campbell. Over the play's run, Bonner and her co-star A.G. Enos developed a dislike for one another. During one performance, he flubbed some lines, and he felt her reaction was disrespectful. After the curtain call, he screamed and cursed at her, even threatening to slap her. Bonner grabbed a hammer and chased him around the theatre, swinging wildly for his head. Enos managed to escape into a dressing room unharmed. Bonner threatened to leave the production, but the situation was smoothed over.

In July 1887, it was announced that Bonner would play Ophelia in Joseph Haworth's production of Hamlet; six weeks later, she left the company, stating that they breached their contract by giving that and other roles she was promised to different actresses.

Her final performance before retiring at the age of 30 was in an outdoor production of William Shakespeare's As You Like It in Saratoga, NY.

== Personal life ==
While performing with Effie Ellsler's company in 1885, fellow actor Charles Mason Mitchell fell in love with Bonner. When she rejected him, he allegedly either threatened or attempted suicide with laudanum. Mitchell survived and went on to become one of Theodore Roosevelt's Rough Riders and an American Consul in five countries.

It was reported that Bonner left the industry to get married, but the relationship with this unnamed man fell apart before the wedding.

Bonner's younger sister, the actress Myra Goodwin, died on 15 October 1892, of heart failure. Goodwin had been an invalid and off the stage for two years. She was 22 years old.

== Death ==
Bonner was found dead in her room at a New York City boarding house on November 15, 1895, the apparent victim of a morphine overdose the previous evening. While she had been working as a costumer since she retired from the stage, there was evidence that she was in financial straits and had been drinking to excess. She was 33 years old at the time of her death.
