= Marjorie Ryerson =

American politician

Marjorie Ryerson is an American editor, photographer, and politician. She represented the Orange-Washington-Addison district in the Vermont House of Representatives from 2013–2017. She is a member of the Democratic Party.

Ryerson earned her MFA at the University of Iowa Writers' Workshop. She worked as an editor and photojournalist for a publications including The Times Argus, The Boston Globe, The Burlington Free Press, and others. From 1991 until 2005 she taught photography and non-fiction writing at Castleton State College. In 2001, she was named a Vermont State Colleges Faculty Fellow. The same year she took a sabbatical to work on books. During this time, she published a photography book, Water Music, featuring her photographs of water along with quotes from musicians. In 2013, she was appointed to fill the Orange-Washington-Addison District seat in the Vermont House of Representatives vacated by the death of Larry Townsend. Her appointment made the Vermont legislature the fourth in the United States to have a majority of seats held by women. She was re-elected without opposition in 2014 and left office at the end of her term in January 2017.
