= Marjorie Pyles Honzik =

American psychologist

- Born: May 14, 1908
- Died: June 16, 2003 (aged 95)
- Citizenship: American
- Spouse: Charles H. Honzik
- Children: Eleanor Honzik Christensen (b. 1938) and Elizabeth Honzik Conlisk (b. 1941)
- Awards: G. Stanley Hall Award for Distinguished Contributions to Developmental Psychology (1983)

Academic background
- Education: University of California, Berkeley

Academic work
- Institutions: Mills College; University of California, Berkeley

Marjorie Knickerbocker Pyles Honzik (born 1908, d. 2003) was a developmental psychologist known for her longitudinal research on children's mental abilities, behavioral problems, and health outcomes.

Honzik received the American Psychological Association G. Stanley Hall Award for Distinguished Contributions to Developmental Psychology in 1983. She was elected Fellow of the American Association for the Advancement of Science in 1984.

== Biography ==
Honzik was born in Johannesburg, South Africa, to an American family on May 14, 1908. She expressed interest in infant and child development from an early age; her interests were formed by observations of cross-cultural differences in the treatment of children in African and European families.

Honzik moved to California in 1927 to attend University of California, Berkeley, where she obtained her bachelor's degree in Psychology in 1930. She also obtained her Master of Arts at University California, Berkeley in 1933. After a two-year fellowship at the National Child Research Center in Washington, DC, she returned to her studies at Berkeley, where she completed a PhD in Psychology in 1936. While in graduate school, she married a fellow student, Charles H. Honzik, who studied maze learning in rats.

Honzik spent most of her career employed as a research assistant at the Institute of Child Welfare, Berkeley. As described by Elliot Turiel, the Institute was a place where women were able to find positions in psychology during a time when women were not hired as faculty. Honzik's research, funded by the National Science Foundation, included a 50-year study of parenting. From 1952-1960, Honzik taught at Mills College as a lecturer in Child Development. Honzik remained affiliated with the University of California, Berkeley until her retirement in 1980.

== Research ==
Honzik's research explored human development over the lifespan. Several of her most influential papers aimed to measure growth in the mental abilities of infants over the first year of life through brain development and changes in observable behaviors. She conducted pioneering work investigating developmental outcomes of infants with perinatal conditions, such as anoxia (oxygen deficiency). Honzik conducted a landmark longitudinal study of parenting behaviors in relation to their children's mental abilities, assessed from age 21 months to 30 years. This study was one of the first to document gender differences in the environmental factors associated with mental growth over time.

Honzik co-authored, with J. W. Macfarlane and L. Allen, a widely cited monograph, published in 1954 and titled A developmental study of the behavior problems of normal children between 21 months and 14 years. Their study aimed to determine frequencies of a wide variety of behavioral problems in a normative sample. These included sleep disturbances, nail biting, speech problems, lying, stealing, selfishness, shyness, and many other potentially problematic behaviors.

Honzik co-edited the book Present and past in middle life, published in 1981. This volume reported longitudinal research findings from the Oakland Growth Study (ages 11 to 50), and the Berkeley Guidance Study (ages birth to age 42). The topics covered included the development of personality, intelligence, and health from adolescence through middle age. Other collaborative research focused on adolescent health and personality in relation to midlife health outcomes, and linked teenage personality traits, i.e., having "a calm, controlled personality" to later health. In this study, Honzik and her colleagues documented gender differences in developmental trajectories. For women, but not for men, measures of health taken in adolescence were predictive of health ratings in middle age.

== Representative publications ==
- Honzik, M. P. (1957). Developmental studies of parent-child resemblance in intelligence. Child Development, 28(2), 215-228.
- Honzik, M. P. (1967). Environmental correlates of mental growth: Prediction from the family setting at 21 months. Child Development, 38(2), 337-364.
- Honzik, M. P., Hutchings, J. J., & Burnip, S. R. (1965). Birth record assessments and test performance at eight months. American Journal of Diseases of Children, 109(5), 416-426.
- Honzik, M. P., Macfarlane, J. W., & Allen, L. (1948). The stability of mental test performance between two and eighteen years. The Journal of Experimental Education, 17(2), 309-324.
- Werner, E. E., Honzik, M. P., & Smith, R. S. (1968). Prediction of intelligence and achievement at ten years from twenty months pediatric and psychologic examinations. Child Development, 39(4),1063-1075.
