= Marjorie Bonner (Ziegfeld Follies) =

American actress and dancer

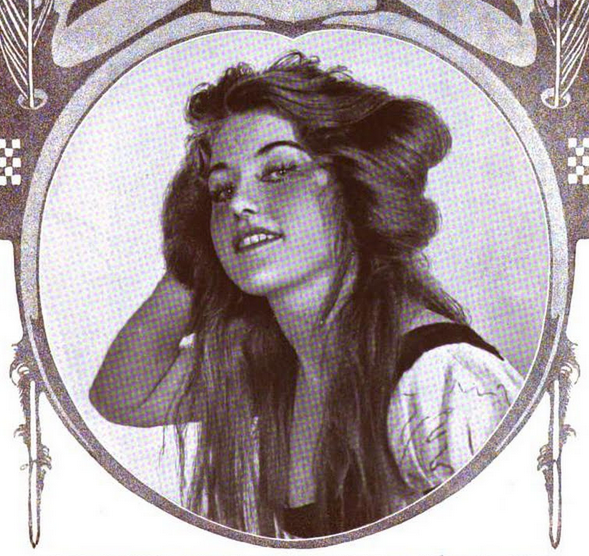
- Majorie Bonner circa 1908
- Born: Marjorie Daw Collins; February 23, 1893; Brooklyn, New York, U.S.
- Died: February 16, 1979 (aged 85); Tampa, Florida, U.S.
- Occupations: Dancer, actress
- Spouse: William H. Power (1908–1942; his death)

Marjorie Bonner (February 23, 1893 – February 16, 1979) was an American dancer and actress who was a member of the Ziegfeld Follies of 1908. Produced by Florenz Ziegfeld, the Follies were presented in June 1908, at the Jardin de Paris, atop the New York Theatre.

She was born as Marjorie Daw Collins in Brooklyn (before NYC was consolidated). She appeared on stage in A Parisian Model (1906–1908), Miss Innocence (1909), A Winsome Widow (1912), and later appeared in a few silent films.

== Personal life ==
She married William H. Power on November 14, 1908 in Cincinnati, Ohio, and they would often appear on stage together.

Bonner reportedly made money from investing in oil stocks. In 1911, it was reported that "Miss Marjorie Bonner, a member of the Anna Held Miss Innocence company, bears the distinction of being the richest chorus girl In the world. While touring Texas seven years ago with Anna Held in The Little Duchess, Miss Bonner invested a small amount of money in Beaumont oil stock. Recently she closed out her holdings at a net profit of $40,000, which she now possesses, in addition to a tidy bank roll accumulated In the past few years. As Miss Bonner has not as yet taken to the automobile habit, and is not a liberal dispenser of money, she is referred to by other members of the organization as "Hetty Greely".

== Death ==
Widowed in 1942, she died in Tampa, Florida on February 16, 1979, and was buried at the Royal Palm Memorial Gardens in West Palm Beach, Florida.
