= Margery (disambiguation) =

Margery is a hamlet in Banstead Downs, Surrey.

Margery may also refer to:

- Margery (name)
- Margery Hill, a hill towards the northern boundary of the Peak District National Park, South Yorkshire
- Margery & Gladys, 2003 British drama
- Margery Austin (schooner), (1918–1919)

== See also ==
- Margery Daw (disambiguation), character, nursery rhyme, books
- 4064 Marjorie (2126 P-L), a main-belt asteroid discovered in 1960
- Marjorie
- Marjory
