= Margery Daw =

Margery Daw may refer to:

- "See Saw Margery Daw", a nursery rhyme
- Margery Daw (Shakugan no Shana), a character in the light-novel series Shakugan no Shana (2002- )
- Margery Daw, a character from the 1881 comic operetta Uncle Samuel
- Saint Margery Daw, a Cornish folk-tale; as (for example) anthologised in Peter and the Piskies: Cornish Folk and Fairy Tales
- Margey Daw (1916), a play by George D. Parker

== See also ==
- Marjorie Daw (disambiguation)
- Marjorie Dawes, a fictional character in Little Britain
