= Marjorie Daw =

Marjorie Daw may refer to:

- "Marjorie Daw" (short story), an 1869 American short story by Thomas Bailey Aldrich
- Marjorie Daw (actress) (1902–1979), American film actress

== See also ==
- "See Saw Margery Daw", a nursery rhyme
- Marjorie Dawes, a fictional character on the television show Little Britain
