= Marjory =

Marjory is a female given name, a variant spelling of Margery or Marjorie. It is sometimes shortened to Marj.

Notable people with the name include:

- Marjory Allen, Baroness Allen of Hurtwood (1897–1976), English landscape architect and promoter of child welfare
- Marjery Bryce (1891–1973), British suffragette and actor
- Marjory Cheney (1880–1967), American politician
- Marjory Cobbe, English midwife granted a pension in 1469 for attending the wife of King Edward IV
- Marjory Stoneman Douglas (1890–1998), American journalist, writer, feminist and environmentalist
- Marjory Gengler (born 1951), American tennis player
- Marjory Gordon (1931–2015), emeritus professor of nursing at Boston College
- Marjory Kennedy-Fraser (1857–1930), Scottish singer, composer and arranger
- Marjory LeBreton (born 1940), leader of the Government in the Canadian Senate
- Marjory Mecklenburg (born 1935), American government administrator and activist opposed to legal abortion
- Marjory Mills (1896–1987), New Zealand embroiderer and businesswoman
- Marjory Newbold (1883–1926), Scottish socialist and communist
- Marjory Saunders (1913–2010), Canadian archer
- Marjory Shedd (1926–2008), Canadian badminton player
- Marjory Stephenson (1885–1948), British biochemist
- Marjory Wardrop (1869–1909), English scholar and translator of Georgian literature
