= Margery (name) =

Margery is a female given name derived from Margaret, which can also be spelled as Marjorie, Margaery, Margery or Marjory. From the Old French, the Middle English forms of Margaret equally derive from the Greek for pearl. Margery, Marjorie and Marjory in the 14th century became a medieval softened translation of French and Church Latin versions of Margaret. After the Middle Ages this name was rare, but it was revived at the end of the 19th century.

Short forms of the name include Marge and Margie.

== Middle Ages and Renaissance (Tudor) period ==
- Margery Arnold (fl. mid 14th century), English landowner
- Margery Baxter, early English church disempowerment activist (Lollard), sentenced to Sunday floggings in 1429
- Margery Brews (d.1495), English love letter writer
- Margery Byset or Margaret/Margery Bissett and variations, turn of 15th century protagonist of the noble Bissett family of Ireland
- Margery de Burgh, 13th century Norman-Irish noblewoman
- Margery Golding, or Margaret, Countess of Oxford, verbally Lady de Vere, wife of John de Vere, 16th Earl of Oxford
- Margery Guinet (d. 1544), English silkwoman to the Tudor Court
- Margery of Hedsor, early 14th century redeemed wayward nun of Burnham Abbey
- Margery Jourdemayne, "the Witch of Eye", executed in 1441 in England
- Margery Kempe, early 15th century English Christian mystic, known for writing what is considered to be the first autobiography in the English language
- Margery Wentworth, later Lady Margaret Seymour, English courtier, grandmother to King Edward VI

== Post-Tudor era ==
- Margery Allingham, British murder mystery and crime fiction novelist
- Margery Anneberg (1966–1981), American museum founder, jeweler and gallerist
- Margery Beddingfield (1742–1763), British criminal
- Margery Beddow, American actress, dancer, director and choreographer
- Margery Booth, British-German opera singer; British spy
- Margery Bronster, Attorney General of Hawaii
- Margery Corbett Ashby, British Liberal politician, feminist and internationalist
- Margery Clinton, Scottish ceramics artist of reduction lustre glazes
- Mina "Margery" Crandon, American 20th century physical medium and illusionist
- Margery Cuyler, American children's book author
- Margery Deane, American author
- Margery Eagan, American columnist with the Boston Herald, talk radio host
- Margery Edwards, Australian artist: spiritual abstract expressionist who worked with mixed media
- Margery Fish, English gardener and gardening writer, specialising in informal cottage gardens
- Margery Fisher, British literary critic and academic
- Margery Fry, British prison reformer
- Margery Gardner, actress; 1946 murder victim
- Margery Greenwood, Viscountess Greenwood (née Spencer), British aristocrat
- Margery Hinton, British Olympic swimming medalist
- Margery Mason, English actress and director
- Margery Maude, English actress
- Margery Manners, British variety performer
- Margery Palmer McCulloch, Scottish literary scholar, author and critic
- Dame Margery Perham, British historian of, and writer on, African affairs
- Margery Ruth Morgenstern Krueger, real name of Jayge Carr, American science fiction and fantasy author
- Margery Sharp, English writer, author of The Rescuers and sequel adapted by Disney
- Margery Saunders, British film editor
- Margery Ward, NDP politician in Ontario
- Margery Williams (Bianco), children's author
- Margery Wilson, American actress and silent movie director
- Margery Wren (1850–1930), English murder victim

== See also ==
- Margery (disambiguation)
- Marjorie
- Marjory
- Margaery Tyrell, character from A Song of Ice and Fire
