= Margaret Alcorn =

New Zealand interior decorator

- Born: 11 July 1868; Hokitika, New Zealand
- Died: 1 November 1967 (aged 99); Wellington, New Zealand
- Known for: Opening and managing "Liberty Wellington" shop in Wellington, New Zealand
- Relatives: Mary Alcorn, sister

Margaret Andrews Alcorn (11 July 1868 – 1 November 1967) was an interior decorator and business owner in Wellington, New Zealand.

== Early life ==
Alcorn was born in Hokitika on the West Coast of New Zealand's South Island in 1868 to Samuel Wesley and Jane Alcorn (born Andrews). Samuel and Jane had emigrated to Dunedin from Ireland, married there in 1865, and then moved to the West Coast. She had one older sibling, Mary and six younger siblings: Ethel, Olive, Winifred, John, William and Kathleen. Samuel was a draper in Hokitika but in 1874 the family moved to Wellington. Samuel bought property in the city on Lambton Quay opposite the department store Kirkcaldie & Stains. He opened a draper shop downstairs and the family lived upstairs.

The drapery business was successful, and the Alcorn children enjoyed a prosperous household with a governess and private schools. This life changed dramatically, however, in 1877 when a fire in the shop destroyed the business and killed a younger daughter of the family, Winifred, aged four. The family moved to Ashburton and the children attended school there. Margaret became a dressmaker after finishing her schooling.

== Business ==
In 1895 some of the Alcorn family moved back to Wellington. Margaret started studying art and design at the Wellington Technical School, and also became the librarian there. In 1902 she won a class prize in design, and in 1903 she won the South Kensington National Book Prize in an art competition run from London. Alcorn's winning entry was of stencilling on fabric, a skill taught by Maud Kimbell, who became a life-long friend of Margaret's.

In 1906, Alcorn and her sister Mary opened a shop in the new Kennedy Building on Lambton Quay, Wellington called "Liberty's Wellington", specialising in art furniture and furnishings, and started selling goods they imported themselves from Liberty department store in London. The sisters also offered professional advice and design ideas for their customers' homes.

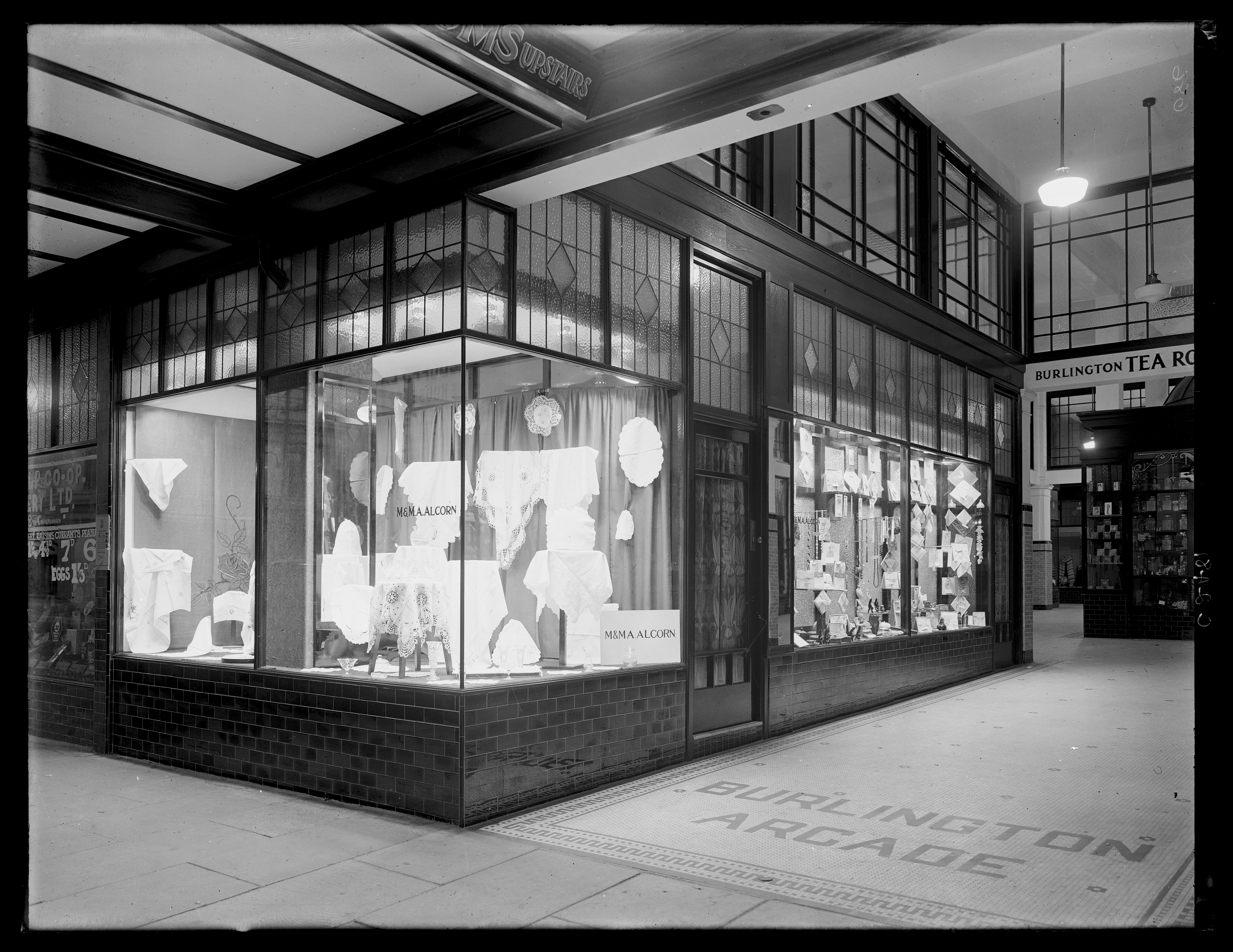
Window display at "Liberty's Wellington", ca 1932

Margaret had a long involvement with the business of Arthur Riley, who had been the principal of the Wellington Technical College when she had studied there, and whose premises were also in the Kennedy Building. Margaret was Riley's company secretary, accountant and later a company director. Riley's importing business is still in operation: Arthur D. Riley & Co. Ltd.

In the early 1920s the Alcorns' shop expanded into larger premises further along Lambton Quay, taking over Thomas Pringle's embroidery shop and business. At this time the Alcorns also hired a local artist and embroiderer, Marjory Mills, to design embroidery patterns for their shop.

After Mary died in 1928, Margaret managed the shop alone, including opening a second shop in Burlington Arcade (pictured). The shops struggled to survive during the Great Depression and the business went into liquidation in 1934. Although Margaret did not legally need to clear the business's debts, she took in boarders until they were paid.

Margaret died at her home in Oriental Bay in 1967 and is buried in a family plot at the Bolton Street Cemetery.
