= Little Britain Live =

Live tour, 2005–2007

- Tour by David Walliams and Matt Lucas
- DVD cover
- Start date: 24 October 2005
- End date: 9 March 2007
- Legs: 2
- No. of shows: 211 in UK & Ireland; 32 in Australia; 243 Total

Little Britain Live is a stage show based on the television sketch series Little Britain, performed by its stars, David Walliams and Matt Lucas, and directed by Jeremy Sams. Supporting characters are played by Paul Putner and Samantha Power (with Anthony Head and Ruth Jones in certain performances). As in the television show, Tom Baker is the narrator, although his lines are pre-recorded. The show toured the United Kingdom and Ireland from October 2005 until December 2006, and Australia from January–March 2007.

== Development ==
In an interview in the show's program, Walliams and Lucas state that they had always wanted Little Britain to be a radio programme, a television series and live stage show.

After production of the third series of the television show, the duo settled down to write and plan the show. In rehearsals, the sketches were tweaked, re-ordered and re-written in order to accommodate the rapid costume and make-up changes required by the principal performers. To remove the need for stagehands to make set and prop changes, an elaborate stage floor was designed with track lines for the props. Sets were projected onto the background of the stage, with computer-animated transitions designed by video and lighting designer Willie Williams.

Certain sketches required elaborate technical mechanisms, such as the vomit machine for the Judy and Maggie "Village Fete" sketch, and oversized props for the Dennis Waterman sketch.

During the show's UK run, several sketches were rewritten to improve the pacing, or removed in cases where the sketch was the same as the television series.

== Performances ==
The show's run began at the Portsmouth Guildhall in Portsmouth, Hampshire, on 23 October 2005. The show toured for 49 performances in 18 cities: Bournemouth, Southend, Plymouth, Sheffield, Manchester, Nottingham, Glasgow, Edinburgh, Newcastle, Liverpool, Oxford, Bristol, Ipswich, Birmingham, Blackpool, Brighton and ending in Manchester on 20 December.

Walliams and Lucas took a month off, before resuming the UK tour and returning to the previously-toured cities. A month-long residency at the Hammersmith Apollo in London in October and November 2006 followed, with two shows at the Brixton Academy. There were 3 live shows in Ireland during the summer of 2006, shown at the Point Theatre in Dublin. The show was eventually seen by nearly one million people on its UK tour from November 2005 to December 2006. Little Britain Live toured Australia in early 2007. Initial bookings were made in Sydney, with other cities added as ticket sales soared. Eventually the show sold out six performances in Melbourne and Brisbane, seven in Sydney and Perth, and two in Adelaide. Performances were also held in Canberra, Newcastle and Wollongong.

== Show order ==
=== Act 1 ===
- Lou and Andy – "Welcome"
- Emily Howard and Florence Rose – "Plumber"
- Carol Beer – "Disneyworld"
- Dudley Punt and Ting Tong – "Dudley in Hospital"
- Kenny Craig – "Engagement Ring"
- Ray McCooney – "Paying the Bill"
- Vicky Pollard – "Assembly"
- Des Kaye – "Hide the Sausage"
- Maggie Blackamoor and Judy Pike – "Village Fete"

=== Act 2 ===
- Anne – "Stars in Their Eyes" – "Whitney Houston's The Greatest Love of All" (guest star Natalie Brown)
- Bubbles DeVere – "Bank"
- Sir Norman Fry – "Press Statement"
- Mr Mann – "Roy's Paint Shop"
- Linda Flint – "Chewbacca", "Blind Dave", "Fiddler on the Roof"
- Dennis Waterman – "Celebrity Big Brother"
- Marjorie Dawes – "Game for New Members", "Audience Weigh-in"
- Mrs Emery – "Greengrocer"
- Sebastian Love and Michael – "Separation"

=== Encore ===
- Daffyd Thomas – "I'm Gay" song

=== Variations ===
Anthony Head (as the Prime Minister) and Ruth Jones (as barmaid Myfanwy) reprised their roles for certain performances, also appearing as backup dancers during Daffyd's song. Head appeared in three performances in Birmingham (5–6 May, 9 December), two in Blackpool (8–9 May), during the show's London run, Cardiff (7 December), Melbourne (30 January – 2 February) and Sydney (3–5 February). Jones appeared in Blackpool (and hence on the DVD), Cardiff, and during the London run.

A special version of the stage show featuring several celebrity guests was performed at the Hammersmith Apollo in London on 22 November 2006, and was shown by the BBC on 16 March 2007 as part of Comic Relief. Celebrity performers included Kate Moss as Vicky Pollard's sister Katie, Dawn French as lesbian barmaid Myfanwy, and the real Dennis Waterman who appeared to sing the Minder "feem toon" with his pint-sized counterpart. The show also featured cameo appearances from Russell Brand, Patsy Kensit, Kate Thornton and DJ Chris Moyles.

Several sketches are adjusted to reflect local content, such as the locality referred to as a 'shithole' by travel agent Carol Beer (Preston in Blackpool, Bolton in Manchester, Wolverhampton or Chelmsley Wood in Birmingham, Derby in Nottingham, Strabane in Belfast, Shepherd's Bush in London, Broadmeadows in Melbourne, Elizabeth in Adelaide, Balga in Perth, Ipswich in Brisbane, Sunderland in Tyne and Wear, Dapto in Wollongong and Charnwood in Canberra), or retail outlets frequented by Vicky Pollard. In Australia, Lucas and Walliams were assisted by local comedians such as Gina Riley and Jane Turner (creators of Kath & Kim) for Melbourne references and Andrew Denton for Sydney.

The Des Kaye and Marjorie Dawes sketches include audience participation, with members of the audience invited on-stage to take part in a game of 'Hide the Sausage' with Des, or participate in a 'weigh-in' with Marjorie.

== Tour dates ==
Date	City	Country	Venue
UK & Ireland
24 October 2005	Portsmouth	England	Portsmouth Guildhall
25 October 2005	Portsmouth	England	Portsmouth Guildhall
26 October 2005	Portsmouth	England	Portsmouth Guildhall
27 October 2005	Bournemouth	England	Windsor Hall
28 October 2005	Bournemouth	England	Windsor Hall
29 October 2005	Bournemouth	England	Windsor Hall
30 October 2005	Bournemouth	England	Windsor Hall
1 November 2005	Westcliff-on-Sea	England	Cliffs Pavilion
2 November 2005	Westcliff-on-Sea	England	Cliffs Pavilion
3 November 2005	Plymouth	England	Plymouth Pavilions
4 November 2005	Plymouth	England	Plymouth Pavilions
5 November 2005	Plymouth	England	Plymouth Pavilions
7 November 2005	Sheffield	England	Sheffield City Hall
8 November 2005	Sheffield	England	Sheffield City Hall
9 November 2005	Sheffield	England	Sheffield City Hall
10 November 2005	Manchester	England	Carling Apollo Manchester
11 November 2005	Manchester	England	Carling Apollo Manchester
12 November 2005	Manchester	England	Carling Apollo Manchester
14 November 2005	Nottingham	England	Nottingham Royal Concert Hall
15 November 2005	Nottingham	England	Nottingham Royal Concert Hall
16 November 2005	Nottingham	England	Nottingham Royal Concert Hall
17 November 2005	Glasgow	Scotland	Clyde Auditorium
18 November 2005	Glasgow	Scotland	Clyde Auditorium
20 November 2005	Edinburgh	Scotland	Edinburgh Playhouse
21 November 2005	Newcastle	England	Newcastle City Hall
22 November 2005	Newcastle	England	Newcastle City Hall
23 November 2005	Newcastle	England	Newcastle City Hall
24 November 2005	Liverpool	England	Liverpool Empire Theatre
25 November 2005	Liverpool	England	Liverpool Empire Theatre
26 November 2005	Liverpool	England	Liverpool Empire Theatre
28 November 2005	Oxford	England	New Theatre Oxford
29 November 2005	Oxford	England	New Theatre Oxford
30 November 2005	Bristol	England	Bristol Hippodrome
1 December 2005	Bristol	England	Bristol Hippodrome
2 December 2005	Bristol	England	Bristol Hippodrome
3 December 2005	Bristol	England	Bristol Hippodrome
5 December 2005	Ipswich	England	Regent Theatre
6 December 2005	Ipswich	England	Regent Theatre
7 December 2005	Birmingham	England	NIA Academy
8 December 2005	Birmingham	England	NIA Academy
9 December 2005	Birmingham	England	NIA Academy
10 December 2005	Birmingham	England	NIA Academy
12 December 2005	Blackpool	England	Opera House Theatre
13 December 2005	Blackpool	England	Opera House Theatre
14 December 2005	Brighton	England	Brighton Centre
15 December 2005	Brighton	England	Brighton Centre
16 December 2005	Cardiff	Wales	Cardiff International Arena
17 December 2005	Cardiff	Wales	Cardiff International Arena
18 December 2005	Cardiff	Wales	Cardiff International Arena
19 December 2005	Cardiff	Wales	Cardiff International Arena
20 December 2005	Manchester	England	Manchester Evening News Arena
25 January 2006	Newcastle	England	Newcastle City Hall
26 January 2006	Newcastle	England	Newcastle City Hall
27 January 2006	Glasgow	Scotland	Clyde Auditorium
28 January 2006	Glasgow	Scotland	Clyde Auditorium
29 January 2006	Glasgow	Scotland	Clyde Auditorium
31 January 2006	Sheffield	England	Sheffield City Hall
1 February 2006	Sheffield	England	Sheffield City Hall
2 February 2006	Sheffield	England	Sheffield City Hall
3 February 2006	Manchester	England	Carling Apollo Manchester
4 February 2006	Manchester	England	Carling Apollo Manchester
5 February 2006	Edinburgh	Scotland	Edinburgh Playhouse
6 February 2006	Edinburgh	Scotland	Edinburgh Playhouse
8 February 2006	Newcastle	England	Newcastle City Hall
9 February 2006	Newcastle	England	Newcastle City Hall
10 February 2006	Manchester	England	Carling Apollo Manchester
11 February 2006	Manchester	England	Carling Apollo Manchester
12 February 2006	Manchester	England	Carling Apollo Manchester
14 February 2006	Nottingham	England	Nottingham Royal Concert Hall
15 February 2006	Nottingham	England	Nottingham Royal Concert Hall
16 February 2006	Nottingham	England	Nottingham Royal Concert Hall
17 February 2006	Bournemouth	England	Windsor Hall
18 February 2006	Bournemouth	England	Windsor Hall
19 February 2006	Bournemouth	England	Windsor Hall
21 February 2006	Plymouth	England	Plymouth Pavilions
22 February 2006	Plymouth	England	Plymouth Pavilions
28 February 2006	Liverpool	England	Liverpool Empire Theatre
1 March 2006	Liverpool	England	Liverpool Empire Theatre
2 March 2006	Liverpool	England	Liverpool Empire Theatre
3 March 2006	Liverpool	England	Liverpool Empire Theatre
4 March 2006	Liverpool	England	Liverpool Empire Theatre
6 March 2006	Portsmouth	England	Portsmouth Guildhall
7 March 2006	Portsmouth	England	Portsmouth Guildhall
8 March 2006	Portsmouth	England	Portsmouth Guildhall
9 March 2006	Brighton	England	Brighton Centre
10 March 2006	Brighton	England	Brighton Centre
11 March 2006	Brighton	England	Brighton Centre
13 March 2006	Manchester	England	Carling Apollo Manchester
14 March 2006	Manchester	England	Carling Apollo Manchester
15 March 2006	Manchester	England	Carling Apollo Manchester
16 March 2006	Manchester	England	Carling Apollo Manchester
17 March 2006	Manchester	England	Carling Apollo Manchester
18 March 2006	Manchester	England	Carling Apollo Manchester
21 March 2006	Blackpool	England	Opera House Theatre
22 March 2006	Blackpool	England	Opera House Theatre
23 March 2006	Birmingham	England	NIA Academy
24 March 2006	Birmingham	England	NIA Academy
25 March 2006	Birmingham	England	NIA Academy
26 March 2006	Birmingham	England	NIA Academy
28 March 2006	Bristol	England	Bristol Hippodrome
29 March 2006	Bristol	England	Bristol Hippodrome
30 March 2006	Bristol	England	Bristol Hippodrome
31 March 2006	Bristol	England	Bristol Hippodrome
1 April 2006	Bristol	England	Bristol Hippodrome
3 April 2006	Brighton	England	Brighton Centre
4 April 2006	Brighton	England	Brighton Centre
5 April 2006	Brighton	England	Brighton Centre
6 April 2006	Brighton	England	Brighton Centre
7 April 2006	Brighton	England	Brighton Centre
8 April 2006	Brighton	England	Brighton Centre
11 April 2006	Liverpool	England	Liverpool Empire Theatre
12 April 2006	Liverpool	England	Liverpool Empire Theatre
13 April 2006	Sheffield	England	Hallam FM Arena
14 April 2006	Birmingham	England	NIA Academy
15 April 2006	Birmingham	England	National Indoor Arena
16 April 2006	Nottingham	England	Nottingham Arena
18 April 2006	Bristol	England	Bristol Hippodrome
19 April 2006	Bristol	England	Bristol Hippodrome
20 April 2006	Bristol	England	Bristol Hippodrome
21 April 2006	Bristol	England	Bristol Hippodrome
22 April 2006	Bristol	England	Bristol Hippodrome
24 April 2006	Oxford	England	New Theatre Oxford
25 April 2006	Oxford	England	New Theatre Oxford
26 April 2006	Oxford	England	New Theatre Oxford
27 April 2006	Nottingham	England	Nottingham Royal Concert Hall
28 April 2006	Nottingham	England	Nottingham Royal Concert Hall
29 April 2006	Newcastle	England	Telewest Arena
30 April 2006	Newcastle	England	Telewest Arena
2 May 2006	Glasgow	Scotland	Scottish Exhibition and Conference Centre
3 May 2006	Glasgow	Scotland	Scottish Exhibition and Conference Centre
4 May 2006	Birmingham	England	NIA Academy
5 May 2006	Birmingham	England	NIA Academy
6 May 2006	Birmingham	England	National Indoor Arena
8 May 2006	Blackpool	England	Opera House Theatre
9 May 2006	Blackpool	England	Opera House Theatre
10 May 2006	Manchester	England	Manchester Evening News Arena
11 May 2006	Nottingham	England	Nottingham Arena
12 May 2006	Nottingham	England	Nottingham Arena
13 May 2006	Nottingham	England	Nottingham Arena
14 May 2006	Sheffield	England	Hallam FM Arena
20 September 2006^{[A]}	Dublin	Ireland	Point Theatre
21 September 2006^{[A]}	Dublin	Ireland	Point Theatre
22 September 2006^{[A]}	Dublin	Ireland	Point Theatre
23 September 2006^{[A]}	Dublin	Ireland	Point Theatre
24 September 2006	Belfast	Northern Ireland	Odyssey Arena
25 September 2006	Belfast	Northern Ireland	Odyssey Arena
26 September 2006	Belfast	Northern Ireland	Odyssey Arena
28 September 2006^{[A]}	Dublin	Ireland	Point Theatre
3 October 2006	London	England	Hammersmith Apollo
4 October 2006	London	England	Hammersmith Apollo
5 October 2006	London	England	Hammersmith Apollo
6 October 2006	London	England	Hammersmith Apollo
7 October 2006	London	England	Hammersmith Apollo
9 October 2006	London	England	Hammersmith Apollo
10 October 2006	London	England	Hammersmith Apollo
11 October 2006	London	England	Hammersmith Apollo
12 October 2006	London	England	Hammersmith Apollo
13 October 2006	London	England	Hammersmith Apollo
14 October 2006	London	England	Hammersmith Apollo
16 October 2006	London	England	Hammersmith Apollo
17 October 2006	London	England	Hammersmith Apollo
18 October 2006	London	England	Hammersmith Apollo
19 October 2006	London	England	Hammersmith Apollo
20 October 2006	London	England	Hammersmith Apollo
21 October 2006	London	England	Hammersmith Apollo
23 October 2006	London	England	Hammersmith Apollo
24 October 2006	London	England	Hammersmith Apollo
25 October 2006	London	England	Hammersmith Apollo
26 October 2006	London	England	Hammersmith Apollo
27 October 2006	London	England	Hammersmith Apollo
28 October 2006	London	England	Hammersmith Apollo
30 October 2006	London	England	Hammersmith Apollo
31 October 2006	London	England	Hammersmith Apollo
1 November 2006	London	England	Hammersmith Apollo
2 November 2006	London	England	Hammersmith Apollo
3 November 2006	London	England	Hammersmith Apollo
4 November 2006	London	England	Hammersmith Apollo
6 November 2006	London	England	Hammersmith Apollo
7 November 2006	London	England	Hammersmith Apollo
8 November 2006	London	England	Hammersmith Apollo
9 November 2006	London	England	Hammersmith Apollo
10 November 2006	London	England	Hammersmith Apollo
11 November 2006	London	England	Hammersmith Apollo
14 November 2006	Edinburgh	Scotland	Edinburgh Playhouse
15 November 2006	Edinburgh	Scotland	Edinburgh Playhouse
16 November 2006	Aberdeen	Scotland	Press & Journal Arena
17 November 2006	Aberdeen	Scotland	Press & Journal Arena
18 November 2006	Aberdeen	Scotland	Press & Journal Arena
21 November 2006	London	England	Hammersmith Apollo
22 November 2006	London	England	Hammersmith Apollo
23 November 2006	London	England	Carling Academy Brixton
24 November 2006	London	England	Carling Academy Brixton
25 November 2006	London	England	Carling Academy Brixton
26 November 2006	Manchester	England	Carling Apollo Manchester
27 November 2006	Manchester	England	Carling Apollo Manchester
28 November 2006	Leeds	England	Grand Theatre
29 November 2006	Leeds	England	Grand Theatre
30 November 2006	Leeds	England	Grand Theatre
1 December 2006	Leeds	England	Grand Theatre
2 December 2006	Leeds	England	Grand Theatre
3 December 2006	Liverpool	England	Liverpool Empire Theatre
5 December 2006	Cardiff	Wales	Cardiff International Arena
6 December 2006	Cardiff	Wales	Cardiff International Arena
7 December 2006	Cardiff	Wales	Cardiff International Arena
8 December 2006	Bournemouth	England	Windsor Hall
9 December 2006	Birmingham	England	National Indoor Arena
11 December 2006	London	England	Hammersmith Apollo
13 December 2006	London	England	Hammersmith Apollo
14 December 2006	London	England	Hammersmith Apollo
15 December 2006	London	England	Hammersmith Apollo
16 December 2006	London	England	Hammersmith Apollo
Australia
30 January 2007	Melbourne	Australia	Vodafone Arena
31 January 2007	Melbourne	Australia	Vodafone Arena
1 February 2007	Melbourne	Australia	Vodafone Arena
2 February 2007	Melbourne	Australia	Vodafone Arena
3 February 2007	Sydney	Australia	Hordern Pavilion
4 February 2007	Sydney	Australia	Hordern Pavilion
5 February 2007	Sydney	Australia	Hordern Pavilion
7 February 2007	Sydney	Australia	Sydney Entertainment Centre
8 February 2007	Sydney	Australia	Sydney Entertainment Centre
10 February 2007	Adelaide	Australia	Adelaide Entertainment Centre
11 February 2007	Adelaide	Australia	Adelaide Entertainment Centre
13 February 2007	Sydney	Australia	Hordern Pavilion
14 February 2007	Sydney	Australia	Hordern Pavilion
16 February 2007	Brisbane	Australia	BCEC Great Hall
17 February 2007	Brisbane	Australia	BCEC Great Hall
18 February 2007	Brisbane	Australia	BCEC Great Hall
19 February 2007	Brisbane	Australia	BCEC Great Hall
20 February 2007	Brisbane	Australia	BCEC Great Hall
21 February 2007	Brisbane	Australia	BCEC Great Hall
23 February 2007	Newcastle	Australia	Newcastle Entertainment Centre
24 February 2007	Newcastle	Australia	Newcastle Entertainment Centre
25 February 2007	Wollongong	Australia	WIN Entertainment Centre
26 February 2007	Canberra	Australia	AIS Arena
27 February 2007	Melbourne	Australia	Vodafone Arena
28 February 2007	Melbourne	Australia	Vodafone Arena
3 March 2007	Perth	Australia	Challenge Stadium
4 March 2007	Perth	Australia	Challenge Stadium
5 March 2007	Perth	Australia	Challenge Stadium
6 March 2007	Perth	Australia	Challenge Stadium
7 March 2007	Perth	Australia	Challenge Stadium
8 March 2007	Perth	Australia	Challenge Stadium
9 March 2007	Perth	Australia	Challenge Stadium

Festivals and other miscellaneous performances
^{A} Bulmers International Comedy Festival

Cancellations and rescheduled shows

23 February 2006	Cardiff, Wales	Cardiff International Arena	Rescheduled to 6 December 2006
24 February 2006	Cardiff, Wales	Cardiff International Arena	Rescheduled to 7 December 2006
25 February 2006	Cardiff, Wales	Cardiff International Arena	Cancelled
26 February 2006	Cardiff, Wales	Cardiff International Arena	Cancelled
28 November 2006	Bournemouth, England	Windsor Hall	Rescheduled to 8 December 2006

== Official releases ==
=== DVD ===
The 9 May performance at the Blackpool Opera House was recorded and released on DVD in the UK (Region 2) and Australia (Region 4). The UK DVD was released on 13 November 2006 in a standard edition format and a special edition format (which included a miniature tour programme).

Also included on the DVD released in Australia (6 December 2006) and in the UK was 'Little Britain's Big Swim' which featured David Walliams swimming the English Channel.

=== "I'm Gay" single ===
Daffyd Thomas's song "I'm Gay" was recorded in a studio and released as an Internet-only single on the UK and Australian iTunes Stores.

== Comic Relief does Little Britain Live ==
This is a night of Little Britain Live with celebrity guests such as Kate Moss and Peter Kay. £3 from each DVD sale goes to Comic Relief. A live Little Britain show was made for Comic Relief at the Hammersmith Apollo on 22 November 2006, and featured many guest artists and celebrities. This version was released in March 2007 and televised as part of Comic Relief: The Big One. It was later included as a bonus feature on the Little Britain Abroad DVD.

Guest artists included:

- Kate Moss as Vicky Pollard's twin sister.
- Dawn French as Myfanwy in the Daffyd Thomas sketch.
- Russell Brand as a cross-dressing plumber who comes out to "fellow cross dresser", Emily Howard.
- Jonathan Ross as the celebrity guest that Judy vomits on at the village fête.
- Chris Moyles as an overweight victim of Marjorie's Fat Fighters club.
- Dennis Waterman as himself, complaining about his portrayal in the Dennis Waterman sketch, then proceeds to sing the theme tune to Minder.
- Peter Kay as wheelchair-using Brian Potter.
- David Baddiel as a member of the audience brought onstage.
- Jeremy Edwards as a molested contestant of Des Kaye's "Hide the Sausage" game
- Patsy Kensit as a girl with hairy armpits who went to seek advice from Linda Flint.
- Kate Thornton as the presenter of Stars in Their Eyes, introducing Anne.
