= Mary Alcorn =

New Zealand Interior designer

- Born: 30 March 1866; Hokitika, New Zealand
- Died: 5 March 1928 (aged 61); Wellington, New Zealand
- Known for: Opening and managing "Liberty Wellington" shop in Wellington, New Zealand
- Relatives: Margaret Alcorn, sister

Mary Alcorn (1866–1928) was an interior designer and business owner in Wellington, New Zealand.

== Early life ==
Alcorn was born in Hokitika on the West Coast of New Zealand's South Island in 1866 to Samuel Wesley and Jane Alcorn (born Andrews). Samuel and Jane had emigrated to Dunedin from Ireland, married there in 1865, and then moved to the West Coast. She had seven younger siblings: Margaret, Ethel, Olive, Winifred, John, William and Kathleen. Samuel was a draper in Hokitika but in 1874 the family moved to Wellington. Samuel bought property in the city on Lambton Quay opposite the department store Kirkcaldie & Stains. He opened a draper shop downstairs and the family lived upstairs.

The drapery business was successful, and the Alcorn children enjoyed a prosperous household with a governess and private schools. This life changed dramatically, however, in 1877 when a fire in the shop destroyed the business and killed a younger daughter of the family, Winifred, aged four. The family moved to Ashburton and the children attended school there. Mary worked as a shop assistant after finishing her schooling.

Mary had a great love of music; she played the piano at concerts such as a Wakanui fundraising concert in 1893 and also sang in the church choir at the Ashburton Wesleyan Church. She and her sisters were also accomplished seamstresses, winning prizes at school competitions for their lacework, embroidery and crewelwork.

== Business ==
In 1906, Alcorn and her sister Margaret opened a shop in the new Kennedy Building on Lambton Quay, Wellington called "Liberty's Wellington", specialising in art furniture and furnishings, and started selling goods they imported themselves from Liberty department store in London. The sisters also offered professional advice and design ideas for their customers' homes.

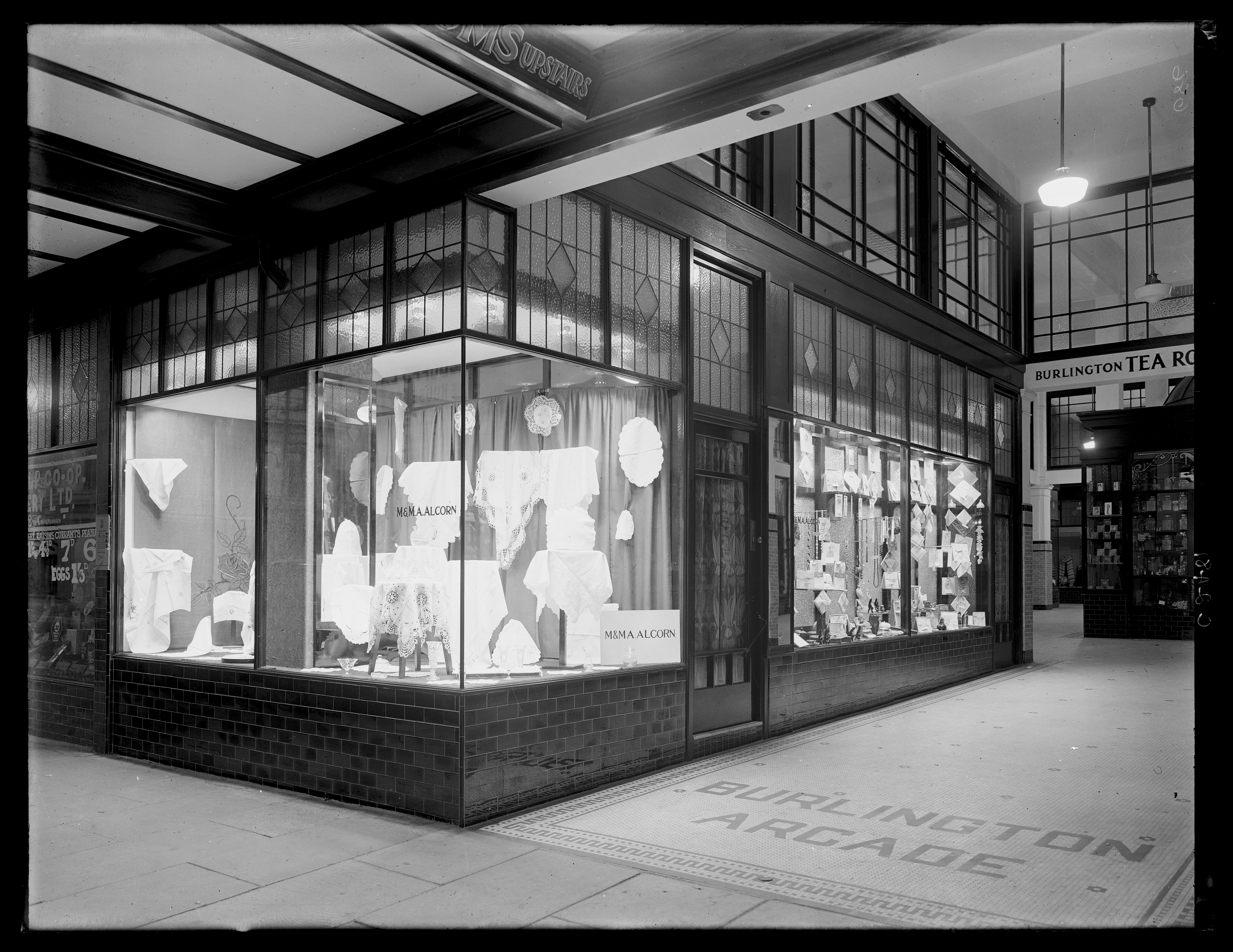
Window display at "Liberty's Wellington", ca 1932

Mary and Margaret lived in Oriental Bay and Mary cycled to the shop each day, which was not a common way for women to travel at the time. Mary extended the business by travelling to England and Europe in 1913 to select goods for the shop herself. She visited potters in Florence and pewter works in Birmingham, and also visited Royal Doulton and Wedgwood pottery firms as well as making several visits to Liberty's.

In the early 1920s the Alcorns' shop expanded into larger premises further along Lambton Quay, taking over Thomas Pringle's embroidery shop and business. At this time the Alcorns also hired a local artist and embroiderer, Marjory Mills, to design embroidery patterns for their shop.

Mary died in 1928 and is buried in a family plot at the Bolton Street Cemetery.

Mary's sister Margaret opened a second shop in Burlington Arcade (pictured) after Mary's death, and managed both shops until they failed in the 1930s due to the Depression.
