= Marjory Mills =

New Zealand embroiderer, artist

- Born: 11 November 1896; Wellington, New Zealand
- Died: 22 May 1987 (aged 90); Dannevirke, New Zealand
- Known for: Watercolour artist, embroidery pattern designer, successful business owner
- Awards: Life member of the New Zealand Academy of Fine Arts

Marjory Hinemoa Mills (11 November 1896 – 22 May 1987) was a New Zealand embroiderer who was an artist and business owner.

== Early life ==
Mills was born in Wellington, New Zealand on 11 November 1896. Her parents were Thomas, a journalist, and Elizabeth (born Huggins). By 1920 the family had moved to Feilding as her father had purchased the local newspaper. Mills continued her schooling at Feilding District High School. Mills' mother taught her embroidery as a child, and she also had lessons with her art tutor's wife, a graduate of the Royal School of Needlework, London.

== Later life ==
In the 1920s, Margaret Alcorn and Mary Alcorn hired Mills to design embroidery patterns for their shop on Lambton Quay, Wellington, called "Liberty's Wellington". Mills had a team of assistants who printed her patterns onto fabric for sale.

The Alcorns' shops went into liquidation during the Great Depression of the 1930s, and Mills went into business on her own. She and a friend, Irene Esau, opened a needlework shop in Palmerston North in 1934, and in 1938 Mills returned to Wellington to open a small embroidery shop in Cable Car Lane. The business was successful, providing not only needlework supplies but also lessons.

In 1952 Mills sold the lease of her shop and went overseas - firstly to England, where she studied art for two years at Saint Martin's School of Art, London, then to Europe for a year's travelling. While overseas, her art work was exhibited at the Imperial Gallery of Art, the Society of Women's Artists, and the Royal Society of Painters in Water Colours.

On her return to Wellington, Mills opened a needlework shop and ran it successfully until the early 1970s, when she again gave up business for art. She moved to Blenheim and taught watercolour painting there with a friend, Brenda Narbey. In 1974 the two artists went to Italy on a painting trip, exhibiting their work in Wellington on their return.

In 1981 Mills moved to Dannevirke to be nearer family. In 1983, she damaged her right hand in an accident and it was amputated. Nevertheless, she learnt to paint and embroider with her left hand and continued with both interests.

Mills died in Dannevirke on 22 May 1987, and was buried at Mangatera Cemetery.

== Recognition ==
Mills was made a life member of the New Zealand Academy of Fine Arts in 1983.
