= Margery Austin (schooner) =

History

Canada
- Name: Margery Austin
- Port of registry: Saint John, New Brunswick, Canada
- Launched: 1918
- Completed: 1918
- Fate: On January 2, 1919 the Margery Austin ran aground, off Apple River near the Apple River Light, on voyage from Alma, New Brunswick to Saint John, New Brunswick.

General characteristics
- Tonnage: 112
- Propulsion: Sail

Margery Austin was a Canadian schooner from New Brunswick built in 1918. On January 2, 1919, the Margery Austin was on voyage from Alma New Brunswick, to Saint John, Brunswick, when she ran aground off the Apple River in Nova Scotia.
