= Margery Deane =

American writer

Margery Deane was the pen name of Marie J. Davis Pitman (née Davis 1850–1888), was an American writer.

== Biography ==
Marie was born in Hartwick, New York on March 17, 1850. She was the daughter of Lucius D. Davis, of Newport, Rhode Island, "Daily News", was educated by private tutors, and in 1866 married Theophilus T. Pitman. She died in Paris, France, on November 30, 1888.

== Works ==
Under her pen-name was "Margery Deane", and Marie wrote children's stories and sketches of travel, and was the Newport correspondent of the Boston Transcript and other journals. She co-authored Wonder-World stories: from the Chinese, French, German, Hebrew, Hindoostanee, Hungarian, Irish, Italian, Japanese, Russian, Swedish, and Turkish, published by G.P. Putnam's Sons, in 1877, and the author of a travel book, European Breezes published by Lee and Shepard in 1880.
