= Marjory Cobbe =

First English midwife recorded in written history

Marjory Cobbe (sometimes written as Margaret or Margery) was an English midwife active in the 15th century. She was the first midwife to be recorded by name in English written history.

== Career in midwifery ==
Cobbe spent her recorded life in Stafford and Devon. She was a midwife and attendant to Queen Consort of England, Elizabeth Woodville, wife of King Edward IV, in the latter half of the 15th century.

It was common for nobility at the time to retain midwives as personal attendants who also provided support on matters related to women's health, although their training was often poor and informal. In her 1938 chronicle, Kate Campbell Hurd-Mead assessed that midwives of the time, including Cobbe, would have nonetheless been "better educated for practical obstetrical work" than male practitioners, owing to the comparatively lesser priority given to women’s health. Biographer Elizabeth Jenkins further suggests it is possible that Cobbe was unusually educated for the era, owing to her background: her husband John may have been the same John Cobbe who was appointed to a commission to decide a land dispute in Kent in February 1468.

On 15 April 1469, Cobbe and her husband John were granted an annual pension of £10 for Cobbe's attendance on Queen Consort of England, Elizabeth Woodville, wife of Edward IV. This sum, which was ordered to come from the revenues of the county of Stafford, was granted to Cobbe one month after the birth of Cecily of York.

Historian Arlene Okerlund suggests this grant indicates Cobbe was a "trusted" attendant of Elizabeth who offered "long-term and dedicated" service to the queen. Jenkins and journalist Sarah Gristwood similarly interpret this provision of a pension as evidence of Elizabeth placing personal trust in, or reliance upon, Cobbe. Jenkins further posits that the timing of the pension suggests Cobbe had been in Elizabeth's retinue since at least the 1467 birth of Mary of York.

Edward's reign was briefly interrupted between 2 October 1470 and 11 April 1471, when he was deposed by Henry VI. Elizabeth Woodville, pregnant with her sixth child, sought sanctuary in Westminster Abbey. On 2 November 1470, Cobbe likely delivered Elizabeth's son Edward (later Edward V), with the assistance of royal physician Domenico de Serigo.

== Later life ==
Cobbe was recorded as still being in Elizabeth's service in 1473. By this time, her husband had died; she was recorded as a widower on that year's rolls of Parliament. When Cobbe's pension was renewed on 8 November 1475, now to be met by revenues of Devon, she was recorded as a widow.

== In popular culture ==
- The 1973 historical fiction novel The King's Grey Mare by Rosemary Hawley Jarman depicts a fictionalised portrayal of Marjory Cobbe (named Margaret Cobbe), and her service to Queen Elizabeth Woodville.
- Cobbe appears as a supporting character in Sharon Kay Penman's 1982 historical novel, The Sunne in Splendour.
- Cobbe is portrayed as a well-known wet nurse in the 2015 historical fiction novel Rebellion by Livi Michael.
