= List of Little Britain characters =

This is a list of characters for the British television and radio sketch show Little Britain and its American spin-off, Little Britain USA.

== Overview ==
Key
Characters that appear for only one sketch are not listed in the table

Character	Little Britain					Little Britain USA
Character	Pilot	1	2	3	Abroad	Little Britain USA
Peter Andre	—N/a	Recurring	—N/a	—N/a	—N/a	—N/a
Anne	—N/a	Recurring	Recurring	Recurring	Recurring	—N/a
Carol Beer	—N/a	—N/a	Recurring	Main	Recurring	Main
Maggie and Judy	—N/a	—N/a	Main	Recurring	Recurring	—N/a
Sir Bernard Chumley	—N/a	Recurring	—N/a	—N/a	—N/a	—N/a
Phyllis Church	—N/a	—N/a	—N/a	—N/a	—N/a	Recurring
Mr. Cleeves						
The Coach						
Counsellor						
Kenny Craig	—N/a	Recurring	Recurring	—N/a	Recurring	—N/a
Marjorie Dawes	Main	Main	Main	Main	Main	Main
Ellie-Grace Day	—N/a	—N/a	—N/a	—N/a	—N/a	Main
Bubbles DeVere	—N/a	—N/a	Recurring	Main	Main	Recurring
Desiree DeVere	—N/a	—N/a	—N/a	Main	—N/a	—N/a
Roman DeVere	—N/a	—N/a	—N/a	Main	—N/a	—N/a
Michael Dinnery	—N/a	—N/a	Recurring	—N/a	—N/a	—N/a
Mrs Emery						
Linda Flint	—N/a	—N/a	Recurring	Main	—N/a	Recurring
Sir Norman Fry	—N/a	—N/a	—N/a	Recurring	Recurring	Recurring
Gary and Jason	Main	Recurring	—N/a	—N/a	—N/a	—N/a
George and Sandra	—N/a	—N/a	—N/a	—N/a	—N/a	Recurring
Edward and Samantha Grant	—N/a	Recurring	—N/a	—N/a	—N/a	—N/a
Emily Howard	Main	Main	Main	Main	—N/a	Main
Ian and Ian	Main	Main	—N/a	—N/a	—N/a	—N/a
Des Kaye	—N/a	Recurring	—N/a	—N/a	—N/a	—N/a
Dr Lawrence	—N/a	Recurring	Recurring	Recurring	Recurring	—N/a
Leonard	—N/a	—N/a	—N/a	Recurring	—N/a	—N/a
Liz and Clive	—N/a	Recurring	—N/a	—N/a	—N/a	—N/a
Sebastian Love	Main	Recurring	Main	Main	Recurring	Main
Lou and Andy	—N/a	Main	Main	Main	Main	Main
Mr Mann	Main	Recurring	Main	Recurring	Main	—N/a
Margaret	Main	Recurring	Main	Recurring	Main	—N/a
Mark and Tom	—N/a	—N/a	—N/a	—N/a	—N/a	Recurring
Dame Sally Markham	—N/a	Main	—N/a	—N/a	—N/a	—N/a
April May and Neville Maddox	—N/a	Recurring	—N/a	—N/a	—N/a	—N/a
Ray McCooney	—N/a	Main	—N/a	—N/a	—N/a	—N/a
Denver Mills	—N/a	Recurring	—N/a	—N/a	—N/a	—N/a
The Minstrels	—N/a	Recurring	—N/a	—N/a	—N/a	—N/a
Myfanwy	Main	Main	Main	Main	Recurring	Recurring
Pat and Don	—N/a	—N/a	—N/a	Recurring	—N/a	—N/a
Sandra and Ralph Patterson	—N/a	Recurring	—N/a	—N/a	—N/a	—N/a
Sid Pegg						
Piano Player	—N/a	Recurring	—N/a	—N/a	—N/a	—N/a
Gerald Pincher						
Harvey Pincher	—N/a	—N/a	Recurring	—N/a	—N/a	Recurring
Vicky Pollard	Main	Main	Main	Main	Main	Main
Jeremy Rent	Main	Recurring	Main	—N/a	—N/a	—N/a
Florence Rose	—N/a	—N/a	Main	Recurring	—N/a	—N/a
Roy	Main	Recurring	Main	Recurring	Main	—N/a
Robert	Recurring	—N/a	Recurring	—N/a	—N/a	—N/a
Michael Stevens	Main	Recurring	Main	Main	Recurring	—N/a
Daffyd Thomas	Main	Main	Main	Main	Recurring	Recurring
Dudley and Ting Tong	—N/a	—N/a	—N/a	Main	Recurring	—N/a
Viv Tudor	—N/a	—N/a	Recurring	—N/a	—N/a	—N/a
Matthew Waterhouse	—N/a	Main	—N/a	—N/a	—N/a	—N/a
Dennis Waterman	Main	Recurring	Main	—N/a	—N/a	—N/a
Mildred	—N/a	—N/a	—N/a	—N/a	—N/a	Recurring
Bing Gordyn	—N/a	—N/a	—N/a	—N/a	—N/a	Main
Senator White	—N/a	—N/a	—N/a	—N/a	—N/a	Recurring

== A ==
=== Alan ===
Alan
- Little Britain character
- Portrayed by: David Walliams

Appearances: Series 3
Alan works for the Donkey Hospice in the town of Achingballs. After contributors give him some money, he blatantly places stickers on embarrassing body parts, such as the genital region or breasts and on someone's rear in a deleted scene. He makes one appearance in Series 3.

=== Peter Andre ===
Peter Andre
- Little Britain character
- Portrayed by: David Walliams

Episodes: Radio Show; Series 1, episodes 4 and 5
Catchphrase: "I love you, Anne" and "I need you, Anne"
Peter Andre is a Royal correspondent for the BBC who gets sacked after first making surreal and false claims about the Royal Family (such as Prince Charles having magical powers, describing the Queen as "The Main One" and mistaking Princess Eugenie for her mother, Sarah, Duchess of York) and then professing his love for Princess Anne through song. He later attempts to enter a royal garden party to give her some drawings, despite being scruffy and without trousers, and is turned away by police. The character's name is a reference to the singer. There are also two deleted scenes in which Peter Andre appears backstage at the Royal Variety Performance (impersonating Keith Harris and Orville the Duck) and at a drug rehab centre.

=== Anne ===
Anne
- Little Britain character
- Portrayed by: David Walliams

Appearances: Starting in Series 1
Catchphrase: "Eh-eh-ehhh!"

Anne is a patient at the Steven Spielberg Hospital in Little Bentcock, where she is being trained for integration into society. She is severely mentally challenged, except when answering calls on her mobile phone, when she converses in a completely coherent and polite manner. Unfortunately for her psychiatrist, Dr. Lawrence, who is almost always accompanied by Dr. Beagrie, she displays poor progress when observed.

She often resorts to extreme behaviour, such as licking or stroking the faces of other people, or destroying things around her. Anne likes poo. She painted a picture out of poo and wrote "Merry Xmas" in poo. Anne has worked at a library (where she earns £5 but then, much to the doctor's surprise, intentionally drops the money into a drain), at a bowling alley and as a pianist in a restaurant; she takes a keen interest in amateur dramatics and home decoration. Her character is similar to that of Mr Doggy's owner.

Anne has appeared in all series and had a Stars in Their Eyes sketch for Little Britain Live. In Little Britain Abroad, Anne met the Pope and went to the Louvre in Paris, from where she stole the Mona Lisa. She also licked the Pope's face, and exposes herself to him. She did not, however, appear in Little Britain USA. She is 39 years old.

=== Ashraf The Horse Whisperer ===
Ashraf The Horse Whisperer
- Little Britain character
- Portrayed by: Matt Lucas

Appearances: Series 3 episode 5

Ashraf is an Indian man working at the local computer shop. He has an unusual way of using a horse to help customers with their IT problems.

== B ==
=== Mrs B ===
Mrs B
- Little Britain character
- Portrayed by: David Walliams

Appearances: Series 2 episode 5
Catchphrase: "Fetch", "Good boy"

Every time she goes out to give refreshment to the builders who are doing work on her garden, she gives them biscuits as if they were a dog. This is by throwing them on the floor or making them do tricks in order to get the biscuit.

=== Bank robbers ===
Bank robbers
- Little Britain USA character
- Portrayed by: David Walliams and Matt Lucas

The bank robbers make an appearance in Little Britain USA. The two appear to be very skillful bank robbers, having a quick and simple manner of robbing a bank, with one going in and demanding money while the other drives the getaway vehicle, and a very secluded hideout. However, it becomes clear that the two are actually too timid to rob the bank properly, with the one played by Lucas getting only a handful of desk pens and the one played by Walliams a desk marker saying "Position closed" on the second attempt, rather than money.

=== Carol Beer ===
Carol Beer
- Little Britain character
- Portrayed by: David Walliams
In-universe information
- Occupation: Bank clerk; Travel agent; Hospital receptionist; Holiday rep (Little Britain Abroad)

Appearances: Starting in Series 2
Catchphrase: "Computer says no.... (coughs)" as well as offering bizarre substitutes to requests.

Carol Beer is a perpetually disillusioned woman who works in a number of jobs that require a very close relationship with her computer, such as a bank clerk, a travel agent or a hospital receptionist. When approached with a reasonable request, such as opening a bank account, a holiday to America or making an appointment, she will type the information into her computer. Upon discovering that the request cannot be met, she will answer with a deadpan "Computer says no."

As a travel agent, she would then follow up her refusal with an offer of a strange, and often unhelpful substitute, of the kind that the customer is very unlikely to agree to, such as when the client asked for a flight to Orlando, "I've got a flight to Guildford" or when asked for a cruise for two people, "There is one place left. Would one of you be prepared to swim alongside?". When she does occasionally offer a helpful alternative, for example, when the recipient wants a flight to Toronto, and she offers a flight to Vancouver, she will make it unhelpful by saying the flight is taxiing now.

Carol is unwilling to use any human initiative beyond checking her computer to help her customers further, and will instead cough in their face to get them to go away. Occasionally, she will amuse herself by being extra unhelpful, such as cancelling a customer's flight plan when he requests a vegetarian option, or telling a child wanting to go to Disney World that the "Mickey Mouse" will just be a man in a suit, finding new ways of swearing in front of children and getting away with it, coughing right in their faces, or just being rude. Another of her trademarks is that, whenever a customer reveals an aspect of their personal lives, such as when a man comments that it's been a while since he saw his daughter, or a couple comment that they have been married for thirty years, she will shrug her shoulders and mutter "Oh."

In Little Britain Abroad, Carol was a rep for a holiday to Spain. When a woman became nauseous, and she and her husband got off the coach for fresh air, Carol drove off without them. When the same couple wished to book an excursion, Carol didn't allow them to go to the concert, said there was one place left on the boat trip and asked if they would be prepared to swim alongside. She also told them they were too old to go to the monastery. They then complained about Carol, saying that she'd been rude and unhelpful. Carol was furious when she discovered this. After Carol pretended to cry, they agreed to withdraw the complaint, and she called them "dirty shitters". In a deleted scene, she does a karaoke cover of "I'm So Excited" by the Pointer Sisters, where she just repeats the chorus, and the woman loses her temper with her, despite having been more patient than her husband.

Carol Beer appears in Little Britain USA, in which she is the receptionist at a hospital. Her most recent escapades involved offering a child named Danielle Lloyd for double-hip replacement, saying that there is "only one Danielle Lloyd" using the hospital, verbally abusing and annoying a pregnant woman and her husband, and denying an injured patient an X-ray. In her final sketch, she tells an elderly patient that he's listed as deceased, and getting frustrated by his slow walking, eventually shouting "Oh, for fuck sake". The patient then gives Carol the middle finger after being ordered to move faster.

In the 2009 Comic Relief for Red Nose Day, comedian Catherine Tate stars as Carol's boss, Dawn, who is evaluating Carol to see if she makes standards to keep her job during a credit crunch.

Carol was considered to appear in Lucas and Walliams' new comedy Come Fly with Me, working as a check-in manager for Flylo Airlines, but was rejected as David Walliams did not want it to be a spinoff of Little Britain.

=== Letty Bell ===
Letty Bell
- Little Britain character
- Portrayed by: David Walliams

Appearances: Series 3 episode 3
Catchphrase: "I love me froggies" and "KILL IT"

Letty appears in only one sketch in Series 3, in which she appears to have an obsession for frogs ("froggies") as her house has in it many frog-related novelties, plus she loudly admits it. The sketch shows her birthday. When her friends present her with a real frog, she strangely reacts with fear and bludgeons it to death with a rolling pin. Originally intended as a recurring character, she also appears in several deleted scenes from Series 3. Letty also appears in the Little Britain video game. In a deleted scene, she lives in a small village called "Slut".

=== Len Boothe ===
Len Boothe
- Little Britain character
- Portrayed by: David Walliams

Appearances: Series 1 episode 7
Catchphrase: "It was just (near a certain location) that my wife, Eileen, first (did something of a sexual nature)"

Len Boothe appears in just one episode of Series 1. He works as the voice-over man on tours of his hometown of Pove. Whenever the tour bus passes a location, i.e. the blacksmiths, the church, the "Hanging Judge" pub, or the Roman bridge, he tells the people a little bit about the place, and then also says something about what his wife Eileen did to him there. They've been married at least 32 years, and the details become more vulgar as the tour proceeds:

- Church: First kiss.
- Pub: Touched her breasts.
- Blacksmiths: Performed oral sex.
- Bridge: Went up the "wrong-un".

In Series 1 Deleted Scenes, Len is working on the bus tours. He has a French woman on the bus, presumably Matt Lucas, who keeps needing to sit down when she and her husband get off the bus. She repeats this when the passengers get back on. The woman had the same appearance as Bubbles DeVere.

=== Boris the Babysitter ===
Boris the Babysitter
- Little Britain character
- Portrayed by: David Walliams

Appearances: Radio Show; Series 1, episode 8
Catchphrase: "Your baby is fine"

Appearing in Episode 8 of Series one, Boris is an intense, but well-meaning Russian man who works as a babysitter. In his appearance, he babysits the son of a couple who are about to go out for a work function. Due to his intimidating appearance and behaviour, the couple are nervous about leaving their baby with him. They decide to take their chances and leave.

Despite their worries, Boris turns out to be a great babysitter, spending his time teaching the baby to play the Balalaika, showing it the silent film The Battleship Potemkin, playing with Stalin and Lenin puppets and dancing around with it on his shoulders. The couple return to find the baby sound asleep with Boris playing his Balalaika to it.

Boris leaves, still acting strangely, and responding to the question "did you have to change him?" with "No, is still the same baby.". The baby then says to the couple "Comrade Stalin salutes you!". Throughout the sketch, Boris mentions having a deceased mother called Piet'kà (Russian: Петька, the informal form of the name Peter) and an evil brother called Josef.

=== PCs Bryce and Rawlinson ===
PCs Bryce and Rawlinson
- Little Britain character
- Portrayed by: David Walliams and Matt Lucas

Appearances: Series 2 episode 3
Catchphrase: "We must have the wrong house!"

PCs Bryce and Rawlinson appear in Series 2 episode 3, in which they are trying to give some sad news to a Mrs. Harris, whose husband has died in a car accident. In the first sketch, they give the news to the wrong Mrs. Harris, and then laugh hysterically when they learn that they've made a mistake. When they give the news to the real Mrs. Harris, they laugh at the memory of their faux-pas. They then decide it's appropriate to share this with the bereaved Mrs. Harris.

=== Maggie Blackamoor and Judy Pike ===
Maggie Blackamoor
- Little Britain character
- Portrayed by: David Walliams

Judy Pike
- Little Britain character
- Portrayed by: Matt Lucas

Appearances: Starting in Series 2
Catchphrase: Maggie: "Who made this?" Judy: "Maggie, NO!"

Maggie and Judy are two ladies from the Women's Institute who judge certain foods at different voluntary or charitable events in the village of Pox. They keenly partake in refreshments provided by their hosts, but when informed that anyone involved in its preparation is either from a non-white ethnic background or is related to someone of this description, has no home or is not entirely heterosexual, for example, when she finds out some marmalade was made by someone called Sanjana Patel, Maggie proceeds to vomit copiously, often on someone else, as Judy looks on, horrified.

Maggie's vomiting is frowned upon by Judy, who often shouts at her to stop, even though she is foolish enough to tell her who made it, or even give it to her in the first place. This portrayal of vomiting strongly emulates the Monty Python's The Meaning of Life sketch, presenting an immensely fat man named Mr Creosote who vomits uncontrollably at a very alarming rate (Part VI: The Autumn Years).

Generally, Maggie's own habit causes her to become quite cautious when eating some things. These bouts of racism/homophobia are contradicted in Little Britain Abroad when Maggie and Judy holiday together in Italy and Maggie suggests they kiss. She vomits the moment she learns this is lesbian behaviour. They both vote Conservative, and Maggie chairs the local Conservative Association, yet both believe that women should not have the right to vote.

Series 3 showed them in a variety of different locations instead of the usual village fairs or church events, such as Maggie visiting Judy at home and Maggie recovering in hospital after a kidney transplant, and vomiting it out again after learning that the donor was called "Mrs. Banerjee". In one Little Britain sketch, Maggie's dog vomits instead of its owner, on a Chinese dog. They were main characters in Series 2, but became recurring in Series 3.

Prior to the third series, The National Federation of Women's Institutes objected to this depiction. The BBC replaced the Women's Institute logo and changed the dialogue in subsequent showings of the programme.

== C ==
=== Sir Bernard Chumley ===
Sir Bernard Chumley
- Little Britain character
- Portrayed by: Matt Lucas

Appearances: Radio Show; Series 1, episodes 3, 5 and 7
Catchphrases: "Yes, I heard it, Kitty!"

Sir Bernard Chumley is a faded actor living in Sandi Toksvig House who looks after his sister, Kitty (evidently against his own will), who is disabled after an accident. Bernard is adamant that he isn't responsible for her disability, often telling guests of his innocence even if he hasn't been asked, implying that he had been responsible for her disability.

In the first sketch in which he appears, Bernard invites a young actor who has written to him (Christian Coulson) over to his flat. He then attempts to seduce him, implying that he is homosexual. This is supported by the fact that he has many photographs of young male actors stuck to his wall. Throughout this sketch, he offers the young man various finger foods. He also says that he found the incident in which his sister lost the use of her legs amusing, and insists that he didn't cause the accident.

In his second sketch, he is visited by his local Meals on Wheels, who are bringing Kitty her daily meal. When talking about how nice the food was, he talks in the first person before hastily adding: "Kitty said" or "She added". As the lady is leaving, he tells her that the food is "a bit dry" and she catches him in the act of eating the food.

In his final sketch, undertakers come to his door to take away the body of Kitty, who has apparently died. However, they then discover she is not really dead and he begs them to "take her anyway". They refuse and he unhappily continues to take care of her.

The character of Chumley is probably the oldest Little Britain character, having appeared in a live-stage show in the early 1990s, his own six-part television series in the late 1990s called Sir Bernard's Stately Homes, and a cameo in Shooting Stars.

=== Phyllis Church ===
Phyllis Church
- Little Britain USA character
- Portrayed by: David Walliams

Appearances: Little Britain USA episodes 1, 2 and 5
Catchphrase: (in a Mr Doggy voice) "If you love me, you'd do it!" and in a Mr Doggy voice, ends every sketch with "You are one crazy bitch!"

Phyllis Church, is an American woman who owns a Cavalier King Charles Spaniel called Mr Doggy. She often likes to talk to Mr. Doggy, then imitates replies from him using a deep voice. For effect, the camera will zoom onto him when she imitates his replies until later, when it becomes clear that Phyllis is providing them herself. "He" orders her to do naughty or anti-social things such as stripping in public and standing in a trash bin, defecating in the park like her dog or throwing a brick through a shop window.

Phyllis and "Mr Doggy" carry on a dialogue as she resists and "he" repeats "his" request, then "he" finally states "if you love me, you'd do it". At the end of each of her sketches she is caught in the act, berated by "Mr Doggy" and she is often arrested by the police. Her character is similar to that of Anne.

=== Mr. Cleeves ===
Mr. Cleeves
- Little Britain character
- Portrayed by: Matt Lucas

Appearances: Series 1

Mr Cleeves is a traditional-looking yet eccentric teacher at Kelsey Grammar school, a reference to actor Kelsey Grammer. Mr Cleeves sets the pupils strange tasks such as finding "the square root of Popeye" and "Edward II divided by Henry V = Hydrogen Peroxide". He also asks for complete silence during a test, which is later revealed to be a test on crisps, but then he does loud things himself, like playing the saxophone, vacuuming the classroom and setting off fireworks.

He has trouble with reading, like when he can't pronounce the words in Great Expectations, he says "Shall we just watch the video?", has a habit of making the boys in his class read aloud at random times, even in mid-word, writes his name (Mr Cleeves) as "Mr Wells" and his subject (Biology) as "French" and very roughly throws the exercise books at his pupils. It is implied that he deliberately marks correct answers as wrong.

He introduces strange new pupils into his class such as a dog, a boy from the 17th century and an adult. The school itself is bizarre as it arranges trips to the moon for only £5 entry fee, pilfers £36 million during small car park jumble sales, has recreational and lunch periods only a few seconds long and has a robot for a careers advisor, which claims that there will be no jobs for human beings in the future. A major character in Series 1, Mr Cleeves made his last appearance in the programme in episode 8.

=== The Coach ===
The Coach
- Little Britain USA character
- Portrayed by: Davenia McFadden

Appearances: Little Britain USA episodes 2, 4, 5 and 6

The Coach works in Wilderness Lodge Boot Camp where Vicky Pollard is sent to after burning down Disneyland. She is interrupted by Vicky during Roll Call. Rather than reacting with annoyance, she patiently waits for her to finish before claiming that she hasn't a clue what Vicky has said. Vicky stays behind to express concern over one of the girls being possibly lesbian. She is told to "run" by the coach.

The next sketch involving the coach, she catches Vicky smoking in the bathroom while ordering the other girls to bed. Vicky mentions a girl stealing an eyeliner pencil, and drawing on the wall of a big fat woman with a penis and writing the coach's name on it. Vicky's hair then caught fire (she had hidden the cigarette in her hair) which made the coach very worried.

Next, she catches Vicky trying to escape, mentioning that she takes attempts to escape very seriously. She increases Vicky's sentence by another six months, mentioning that she was due to be released the next day. In the last sketch, Vicky goes to hospital and loses her voice after jumping off the chapel roof. The coach appears to be very caring for Vicky, though Vicky reacts by telling her to "get off me you dirty [lesbian]".

=== Counsellor ===
Counsellor
- Little Britain character
- Portrayed by: David Walliams

Appearances: Series 2

The Counsellor made several appearances in Little Britain Series 2, in which he is always seen in his office, talking to patients. Upon his patients leaving, he disregards the rule of confidentiality and promptly picks up his telephone and calls his friend, to whom he then relates what the patient has just told him and insults the patient. He also makes a few appearances in the Deleted Scenes. The Series 2 Script Book names him as "Dr Lowe".

=== Kenny Craig ===
Kenny Craig
- Little Britain character
- Portrayed by: Matt Lucas

Appearances: Radio Show; Appeared in first 2 series
Catchphrase: "Look into my eyes, look into my eyes, the eyes, the eyes, not around the eyes, don't look around the eyes, look into my eyes [snaps fingers], you're under." (After dialogue relating to situation), "3, 2, 1... [snaps fingers], you're back in the room"

Kenny Craig is a stage hypnotist who often uses his powers purely for his own ends, such as beating his mother in a game of Scrabble (by playing the non-existent word "cupboardy", which, according to him, meant "cupboard-like" and hypnotising her into believing it is a real word), getting dates from and seducing women and gaining or avoiding spending money.

In most of the early series, Kenny Craig sketches are based on him hypnotising one or more people into doing things or accepting as fact a ridiculous premise, some of whom aren't really hypnotised, but were merely playing along. He may use his powers to get out of an awkward situation, such as hypnotising everyone present when he accidentally damages a man's car.

His powers appear to improve as the series progresses. In later episodes he manages feats such as putting on a hypnosis show – in which he does nothing but hypnotise the audience into believing they have actually witnessed an incredible hypnosis show before sitting back to read a book for an hour, Andy McNab's Bravo Two Zero, finally taking them out of their trance at the timetabled end of the show. In a deleted scene, he attempts to get a job entertaining a dinner party, by faxing the employer a picture of his face and trying to hypnotise him over the phone, which doesn't work.

In Little Britain Abroad, while holidaying in Portugal, he is hypnotised by Paul McKenna (who does this in Kenny's trademark "Look into my eyes..." style) into losing his powers of hypnosis, living on the street and digging through dustbins to find a half-eaten box of KFC. He made an appearance in Little Britain Live, but not in the USA adaption of the programme. He appeared in a deleted scene on the LBUSA DVD, using his hypnosis to get a woman in a supermarket to agree to go out with him, go to his show and then make love with him at a motel.

=== Latymer Crown ===
Latymer Crown
- Little Britain character
- Portrayed by: Matt Lucas

Appearances: Radio Series, Pilot Episode and Series 1 Deleted Scenes.

Latymer Crown is a masseur who works on a patient of hers called Jonathan, a very stress prone patient. Latymer tries to relax Jonathan by using the strangest methods, like telling gruesome stories and thoughts, screaming a horrible lullaby and playing blood curdling music which she found relaxing, but others find tense.

In one episode, she attempts to make Jonathan relax by using the following mental image. "I'd like you to think of a gang of children throwing stones at a pensioner. He's weeping softly, softly weeping, the children are lifting him, and putting him into a wheelie bin. This is being pushed down a hill and the children have let go." She is then surprised that Jonathan is not relaxed.

== D ==
=== Barbara Dawes ===
Barbara Dawes
- Little Britain character
- Portrayed by: David Walliams
In-universe information
- Siblings: Marjorie Dawes

Barbara is the sister of Fat Fighters weight loss instructor Marjorie Dawes. She attends Marjorie's group in one episode, but is not fat.

=== Marjorie Dawes ===
Marjorie Dawes
- Little Britain character
- Portrayed by: Matt Lucas
In-universe information
- Occupation: Weight loss instructor
- Siblings: Barbara Dawes

Appearances: Radio Show; Starting in Series 1
Catchphrases: "Oh, man, I love the cake!", "Dust?", "Oh, man, you is fat!", "'ave we got any neeew members?", "It's not easy, is it?", "Hello, Fatties!", "Do it again", "But YOU are sumin' else!", "Man, you fat, you fatty fatty fatty!", "Say it again?", "Ska-roo you!"

Marjorie Dawes is a woman who runs a branch of a weight loss group called "Fat Fighters" (a group similar to real-life Weight Watchers), despite weighing approximately 15 stone 8½ pounds (99 kg) herself. She is notoriously rude and mean-spirited, especially towards the members of Fat Fighters, of whom she hypocritically makes fun for being fat. Her sketches featured guest appearances from Vanessa Feltz (who called her a "total cow", prompting Marjorie to spit at her in rage) and Derek Martin in Series Two and Three respectively.

The regular members include Pat, Paul, Tania (the oldest member of the group), several unnamed members and an Indian woman named Meera. In Series 2, Pat and Paul start a relationship and the two get married. It is implied in a Series 1 episode that Marjorie had had a brief sexual encounter with Paul, after which she berates him for it.

One trademark of the sketches is that Marjorie pretends not to hear or understand what Meera says, needing another member, usually Tania, to interpret, or mishearing it as something else. Other trademark actions of hers are misspelling "chocolate" (spelling it "choclit", "choglud" or "chucklet"), and blatantly overeating despite attempts to hide it, and avoiding the subject of her own weight whenever it comes under scrutiny – such as shouting at her superior at Fat Fighters Head Office.

She even tried to pretend her trolley (which was full of food that is high in fat) was someone else's when she ran into Paul in her local supermarket, and later when Meera turns out to be the cashier. In one sketch from Series 3, Marjorie had a fake tan that went wrong and made her skin orange. This causes her members to take revenge and be mean to her by suggesting orange-coloured or flavoured binge foods such as "Paul: Terry's Chocolate Orange, Tania: Tango, Meera: marmalade (which Marjorie writes as conserves) and Pat: satsumas". Marjorie then calls Pat a fat cow.

In the final episode of series 3, all the Fat Fighters attendees desert the group en masse after finally growing tired of Marjorie's hurtful remarks and poor weight loss advice. Marjorie is shocked at this.

Marjorie appeared in Little Britain Abroad, where she went on an exchange to America and attended a meeting in Texas. A new member of the group was the local sheriff, who was less tolerant of Marjorie's rudeness and, after being pushed too far in a matter of minutes after being called "Boss Hogg", arrested her. Meanwhile, Marjorie's Texan counterpart, Blanche Chuckatuck (portrayed by David Walliams) took Marjorie's group in the UK. Although Blanche Tuckatuck was much more polite, more kind and gave more helpful weight-loss advice than Marjorie, she had one serious flaw – she was a member of the Ku Klux Klan. Like Marjorie, she was also racist to Meera and pretends not to understand her. The narrator, in his voiceovers, expresses contempt towards people who are overweight, much like Marjorie's own contempt.

Marjorie returns to America in Little Britain USA and a new aspect of her personality is shown – she is also homophobic, as seen when Rosie O'Donnell attends a meeting and gets her own taste of Marjorie's medicine. As with Meera in the UK series, she pretends not to understand a Mexican member of the group, whom she also refers to as an illegal immigrant and that Marjorie believes is from the Philippines. She appeared in four of the episodes and a deleted scene in which she convinces Slimmer of the Year Lisa Warren (Sarah Chalke) that her donuts are low-calorie, because she insulted her.

Marjorie made several TV appearances in other shows before Little Britain, most notably, appearing as the mother of George Dawes, the overgrown baby who was resident drummer and scorekeeper on Shooting Stars, also played by Lucas. George Dawes is not mentioned in any version of Little Britain. She also made an appearance at the marriage of David Walliams and Lara Stone.

Marjorie's name is a reference to the nursery rhyme, See Saw Margery Daw.

=== Ellie-Grace Day ===
Ellie-Grace Day
- Little Britain USA character
- Portrayed by: Matt Lucas

Appearances: Little Britain USA episodes 1, 4, 5 and 6
Catchphrase: "I love you more than [something nice]", repeats twice until "I love you more than [something vulgar]".

Ellie-Grace is a caricatured "sweet" little American school girl who appears regularly in Little Britain USA. When parting with her mother for any particular reason, such as a trip to a brownie camp or having her tonsils removed, they will share love sentiments, or their "I love you more than" game. While these will start off with "nice" things, she innocently comes up with vulgar ones that are often sex-related, for example, "I love you more than transsexual porn", much to the horror of her mother.

In their final sketch they visit a friend's house. As they are parting, Ellie-Grace, who has been warned by her mother not to come up with any vulgar love sentiments, pressures her mother into sharing one more round, which she reluctantly complies with. Just as it looks fine, when Ellie-Grace's sentiments turn out not to be vulgar, her mother accidentally comes up with one herself. This then traumatizes Ellie-Grace and her friends, who are then comforted by her friends' mother.

The two appeared alongside Robbie Williams in the Little Britain Comic Relief sketch for Red Nose Day 2009. Williams played Ellie's best friend Candy-Marie in a sketch which parodies The Exorcist.

=== Bubbles DeVere ===
Bubbles DeVere
- Little Britain character
- Portrayed by: Matt Lucas

Appearances: Since Series 2
Catchphrase: "Call me Bubbles, darling; everybody does!", (clapping hands) "Champagne! Champagne for everyone!", "'Ello, dahlin!", "Why don't you take a photo? It'll last longer!"

Bubbles DeVere is a bald and morbidly obese woman, who permanently takes up residency at Hill Grange Health Spa in Trump. She has a habit of taking her clothes off, primarily to obstruct any attempt to get her to pay off her tremendous debts and cost of living, but also because she believes she is exceptionally beautiful.

In Series 2, the owner of the spa, Mr. Hutton (Walliams) tries frequently to get her to pay for the increasing cost of her stay at the spa to no avail. Bubbles is prepared to go to any lengths to avoid doing so, including hiding so long in a tanning bed that she burns her entire body the colour of charcoal. Bubbles seeks to emulate the upper classes. She mispronounces many English words à la française and is unable to pronounce "v" in certain words ("diworce"). It is also frequently implied she is some kind of debutante, despite being 43 years old and divorced.

In Little Britain Abroad, she travels to Monte Carlo to stay with Ronnie Corbett, whom she believes to be one of her oldest friends, in spite of the fact he does not know her. She later visits a boutique at a ski resort in Klosters to borrow a dress for a dinner party, but ends up ruining the dress upon wearing it. In the same sketch, to show off to the shop assistant, she pretends to be phoned by novelist Jilly Cooper.

In Little Britain USA, she travels on a cruise ship, racking up huge debts in the casino, revealing that she is also a gambling addict. Each time she loses a bet, she gambles everything on the roulette wheel, including her earrings, her clothes and even her wig. She later tries to seduce the captain of the cruise ship to talk him out of her paying gambling debts, only to be kicked out. Later in her third and final appearance, she was put off the ship but swam back, revealing that she is a champion swimmer, and tries to seduce a rich man.

She appeared in Little Britain Live, in which she attempts to seduce a bank manager to avoid paying her credit card debt of £180,000.

=== Desiree DeVere ===
Desiree DeVere
- Little Britain character
- Portrayed by: David Walliams

Appearances: Since Series 3
Catchphrase: "Baby" (as opposed to Bubbles' "Dahlin" and usually pronounced "bebby", "babby" or "bubby")

Desiree (pronounced "de-zee-ray") is the rival of Bubbles and the new wife of Bubbles' ex-husband, Roman. Desiree, like Bubbles, is an obese woman, larger even than Bubbles, who frequently appears naked, wears only a small silver dress and is bald, though, like Bubbles, she wears a wig. She is a lot more spiteful than Bubbles.

Roman enjoys watching the two of them wrestling naked. He divorced Bubbles because she lost an amount of weight. She is believed to be former Miss Botswana and an ex-Olympic Showjumper. On one occasion, when she bends over to search for her wig, Bubbles remarks, referring to Desiree's anus, "Oh, it's like the Black Hole of Calcutta!", to which Desiree replies "How dare you make personal remarks about my a-hole!".

=== Roman DeVere ===
Roman DeVere
- Little Britain character
- Portrayed by: Rob Brydon

Appearances: Since Series 3

See Desiree DeVere, above

Roman DeVere is the husband of Desiree DeVere, and the ex-husband of Bubbles DeVere. He gets frustrated when Bubbles tries to interrupt his and Desiree's honeymoon. He appears to have some sort of a fetish for fat women as he enjoys seeing Bubbles and Desiree wrestle in the nude, and in one sketch, got an erection after seeing Bubbles naked, getting a slap from Desiree on it due to a believed sex scandal.

=== Michael Dinner ===
Michael Dinner
- Little Britain character
- Portrayed by: David Walliams

Appearances: Series 2, Episodes 4 and 5

Michael Dinner, also known as The Posh Diner, is a man who is always seen in a restaurant. In each of his sketches he is approached by a waiter and gruffly orders posh dishes, before ordering something basic or mass-market (such as Um Bongo, Hubba Bubba or Monster Munch) as the waiter walks away. Michael appeared on the Comic Relief episode and in the deleted scenes of the second series. His name is a reference to film director Michael Winner and was revealed in the Little Britain Top Trumps cards.

=== The Divorced Couple ===
The Divorced Couple
- Little Britain character
- Portrayed by: Matt Lucas and David Walliams

Appearances: Little Britain USA episode 2

Making one appearance in the U.S version of the show, a couple are divorcing because of the wife's homosexuality. As they are packing her belongings into boxes, the husband discovers numerous books, toys and essentials that suggest her homosexuality that she kept hidden from him. At the end of the sketch he accidentally uncovers a book of his entitled "Sir Ian McKellen's book of men's bottoms", indicating that he is homosexual as well.

=== Mr Doggy ===
Mr Doggy
- Little Britain character
- Species: Dog

Mr Doggy is the dog owned by Phyllis Church.

=== Doug ===
Doug
- Little Britain character
- Portrayed by: Matt Lucas

Appearances: Series 2
Catchphrase: "Stay where you are!" and "50 words for cocaine! Go!"

Doug makes only one appearance in the entire series. He was shown to be giving firm and very tough lectures at a drug rehabilitation centre, while kindly telling them that he will help them overcome their habits.

During the entire appearance, a lady in the rehab tries to leave, insisting she is at the wrong lecture, but he refuses her request each time. He made several more appearances in the Deleted Scenes of Series 2, in which his mother appears at his lecture and indicates that his supposed drug addictions are all made up and he has never actually done hard drugs. A more polite version of Doug appears in a deleted Peter Andre sketch from Series 1.

== E ==
=== Mrs Emery ===
Mrs Emery
- Little Britain character
- Portrayed by: David Walliams

Appearances: Since Series 3
Catchphrase: "Oh, 'ello, dear!", as well as urinating uncontrollably

Mrs Emery is a friendly old lady who is never one to back out of a nice long chat. Her sketches typically show her in some public place such as a library, supermarket or post office, and meeting someone with whom she is familiar or acquainted and starting chatting to them. While conversing, she then starts urinating uncontrollably, much to the shock of the person in question.

She is oblivious to her constant urinating and always believes the mess she leaves behind is the result of a pipe leak or someone else's behaviour. In her final sketch, a doctor, after examining her leg, and seeing her uncontrollable urinating, asks her if she has anything else wrong with her, which she denies. Her sketches attracted controversy soon after the launch of the third series when they were criticised by the UK incontinence charity Incontact.

=== Eileen and Janet ===
Eileen and Janet
- Little Britain character
- Portrayed by: David Walliams and Matt Lucas

Appearances: Series 1, Episode 5

Eileen and Janet appear only in one episode in Series 1. In their sketch, Eileen (Lucas) is consoling her sister, Janet (Walliams), who has recently lost her husband, Ivor. Throughout the sketch, a mention of certain and sometimes very simple things, such as a visit to the shops, reminds Janet of Ivor and makes her start sobbing, while Eileen patiently consoles her. At the end of the sketch, she firmly reminds her sister that they had decided not to talk about Ivor's death. They originally appeared in the radio show.

The characters appear in the Series 1 DVD extra "What does Britain mean to you?".

== F ==
=== Linda Flint ===
Linda Flint
- Little Britain character
- Portrayed by: David Walliams
In-universe information
- Occupation: University counsellor

Appearances: Since Series 2
Catchphrases: "Martin, it's Linda", "How can I describe him/her?", "That's right" or "That's it – [insulting epithet]"

Linda is a university counsellor who always has a student in her office asking for something, usually course-related. Linda calls a man named Martin, unseen and unheard to the audience, to grant the request and is asked to describe the student in question. While she often begins with complimentary or basic descriptions, such as the colour of the hair or skin, good personalities or what they're wearing, she will then use descriptions that mock the student's culture or appearance or anything about them outstanding, such as a mole on their upper lip or their lack of hair, and using an insulting epithet to describe them, such as "big fat lesbian", "ching-chong Chinaman", "Ali Bongo", "Fatty Fatty Boom Boom", "the Oompa Loompa", "Magnum, P.I.", and "BALDY!" after the kinder words fail, much to the shock of the students in question.

Her office is decorated with counter-cultural and Communist paraphernalia, a bust of Lenin and several Soviet flags.

In the last episode of Series 3, all of the students she had insulted in Series 2 and 3 came to tell her they wanted to place a formal complaint about her. When she called Martin to sort it out, she referred to them as "the whole cast of Fraggle Rock". The tables were turned on her in a Little Britain Abroad deleted scene when her Australian counterpart, Germain, remarked that she had greying hair, smelt a bit musky, needed a shave and was on the wrong side of menopause ("The dried up old witch"), sending Linda out in tears.

She appears in deleted scenes in which she names a boy with half his right arm missing "Handy Andy" and a student with an upturned nose a "pig", though she made no comments to Martin about the latter.

=== Sir Norman Fry ===
Sir Norman Fry MP
- Little Britain character
- Portrayed by: David Walliams
In-universe information
- Occupation: Conservative MP

Appearances: Since Series 3
Catchphrase: "As far as I'm concerned, that is the end of the matter. Thank you."

Sir Norman Fry is a Conservative MP who seems to be traditional, and has a wife, Camilla (Matt Lucas), and two children. He is always issuing statements to the press regarding embarrassing situations in which he has apparently been caught. His statements are written and delivered in an ineffective attempt to make his misadventures sound innocent and justifiable, using phrases such as "on entering the room, my clothes accidentally fell off" or "I followed the gentlemen into the toilet cubicle to discuss foreign policy", and to cover up his apparent homosexual urges, since all of his statements refer to encounters with other men.

He always makes his statements outside his country manor, with his wife and children present, and will proceed to kiss his wife after finishing his statements. Although initially supportive, his wife grows irritable as he issues more and more statements, and she eventually walks away without even giving him a chance to kiss her.

An American counterpart of Sir Norman Fry, Republican Party Senator White, appears in episodes 5 and 6 of Little Britain USA. Fry is somewhat similar to the Viz character Baxter Basics.

== G ==
=== Gary and Jason ===
Gary
- Little Britain character
- Portrayed by: Matt Lucas
In-universe information
- Mother: Maureen
- Sisters: Julie

Jason
- Little Britain character
- Portrayed by: David Walliams

Appearances: Radio Show; Series 1, episodes 1, 2, 7 and 8
Catchphrase: Jason: "Heellloooo..."

Gary and Jason are two working-class friends who always visit Gary's grandmother, on whom Jason has a crush. Jason always tries to play on to Gary's grandmother, be it by performing the Heimlich maneuver on her or seeing her to the bathroom or wiping her spillings and sucking her toes, the latter of which horrifies Gary to the point of ordering him out of her house.

When Jason later visited Gary's grandmother, he was aroused by seeing her kissing her sister, which was further enhanced by her offering a sandwich, which he interpreted as the sex position. A sketch is included in the deleted scenes on the Series 2 DVD, where Jason is having sex with Gary's grandmother. This sketch was originally planned for the TV series, but Matt Lucas and David Walliams censored themselves by not showing it.

=== George and Sandra ===
George
- Little Britain USA character
- Portrayed by: David Walliams

Sandra
- Little Britain USA character
- Portrayed by: Matt Lucas

Appearances: Little Britain USA episodes 1, 2, 4 and 6
Catchphrase: George: "Come on, you cunt, you've ruined my life, I really am now just waiting for you to die! Help me out here, you boring old cow."

George and Sandra are a middle-aged English couple celebrating their 40th wedding anniversary in the United States. However, their marriage has deteriorated to the point that they often remain in an awkward silence which George tries to break in the best tone he can give. When this doesn't work, he comments on how he dislikes her.

In their second sketch he compares their current relationship to that of a pair of primates in a zoo which they visit on a daytrip. Sandra remains motionless and completely silent, uttering only one word throughout the entire series, "ornithophobic" which she used to remind George of her fear of birds. In the last of their sketches, they return to the United Kingdom and, when George leaves for their aeroplane, Sandra shows no sign of wanting to follow.

=== Bing Gordyn ===
Bing Gordyn
- Little Britain USA character
- Portrayed by: David Walliams

Appearances: Little Britain USA
Catchphrases: "I went to the Moon!"

Bing Gordyn is the eighth and second to last man to walk on the Moon. As he has a moustache, he likes to call himself as "the first man with a moustache to walk on the moon". He is exceedingly bitter about the fact that he is largely unknown to the general public, as opposed to Neil Armstrong. In his first appearance, speaks to a Boy Scout troop about the moon, but when they show a lack of interest and the questions turn to other astronauts like Armstrong and Buzz Aldrin, he lashes out at the boys, asking them if they'd ever done anything important like walk, or in the case of one wheelchair-using boy, roll on the moon.

In his second sketch, he arranges plumbers and other handymen to his house to try and impress them about his exploits, but always fails to do so. In his final sketch, he pulls out a shotgun on a university student writing an essay on the theory of the faked moon landings. For once, he mentions the negative details of his trip, "It was real cold, the food was horrible, I threw up in my helmet!", before chasing him out of his house and yelling "I went to the goddamn Moon!"

He is similar to the character Denver Mills, as they both are Walliams characters and both hold major achievements that nobody else cares about.

In real life, twelve men walked on the Moon. The eighth was the late James Irwin, the second to last was Harrison Schmitt.

=== Edward and Samantha Grant ===
Edward Grant
- Little Britain character
- Portrayed by: David Walliams
In-universe information
- Occupation: Teacher

Samantha Grant
- Little Britain character
- Portrayed by: Helen Coker

Appearances: Radio Show; Series 1, episodes 5 and 7

Edward Grant is a schoolteacher married to his ex-pupil Samantha. Their marriage had not gone down at all well with Samantha's parents in the early days, but they now claim that they share an ordinary marriage just like any other.

However, Edward behaves as though Samantha were still a school pupil, saying things such as "the bell is a signal for me, not for you" upon the doorbell ringing and "you copied it from Nigella!" upon Samantha's revelation that she used a Nigella Lawson sorbet recipe. In their final sketch, Edward tells Samantha that he will be out the next day and that another teacher will be covering for him, much to her shock. They appear in a few sketches in the Series 1 deleted scenes, but Edward had a different appearance compared to his sketches in the TV Series.

== H ==
=== Eddie (Emily) Howard ===
Emily Howard
- Little Britain character
- Portrayed by: David Walliams
In-universe information
- Other names: Eddie Howard

Appearances: Radio Show; Since Series 1
Catchphrase: "I'm a lady! That's what I am, a lady! I do lady things!" and sometimes ending long statements with "... and shit."

Emily, whose real name is Eddie Howard, is an awkward and very unconvincing transvestite. He has only ever been acknowledged as a woman once in the entire series. The man in question then caught her in the male bathroom of the pub he was at. Rather than trying to be like a modern woman, Emily wears outdated Victorian frocks and his behaviour follows that of the outdated Victorian stereotype, talking in an exaggeratedly high-pitched voice, with an equally high-pitched nervous laugh, using the word 'lady' as an adjective for almost everything, and feigning a lack of strength, which only makes him even less convincing.

He is in the habit of using French words in normal conversation. Most sketches involving Emily revolve around performing stereotypically male behaviour, such as fixing a car or playing football, in spite of his appearance, or exaggerated attempts to persuade others he is a woman and to allow him to perform exclusively female behaviour, e.g. entering a women's changing room. From the second series onwards, Emily has best friend Florence/Fred as a companion and is teaching him how to pretend to be like a lady.

Emily appears alone in Little Britain USA. In his first sketch, he attempts to become a model for an art class, but is forced to pose with no clothes on, thus being forced to admit he is not a lady. He also meets Sting, and sings and kisses him. In his third sketch, he is arrested and, due to the seriousness of the situation, Eddie Howard is forced to admit he's a male, much to his frustration. It is revealed Eddie has a wife and three kids, one of whom is named Tommy. In his final sketch, he blind-dates another man, who accidentally drives off with his wig. Though Emily is one of the series' primary characters, neither Emily nor Florence appeared in Little Britain Abroad.

Emily appeared in a sketch for Sport Relief 2016 where he trains Peter Crouch on how to be a lady.

== I ==
=== Ian and Ian, The Record Breakers ===
Ian
- Little Britain character
- Portrayed by: David Walliams and Matt Lucas
In-universe information
- Occupation: World record attempters

Appearances: Series 1

At the end of each show in Series 1, they try to set a world record, but end up not meeting the requirements or not having essential things. For example, they want to set the record for the world's tallest man, but then realise that wearing an excessively tall top hat does not count. They want to set the record for the largest baked bean bath, but then realise they need more than one tin of baked beans to fill the bath. On one occasion, they lost their subject when trying to break the record for the world's smallest ant.

Each attempt usually takes place in an empty auditorium, showing that they are largely unpopular record attempts. The next sketch shows that they were making the world's largest meat pie, but did not get an oven big enough to bake it. Their last sketch was the record for the most people in a Mini, but they could only fit four people in the car.

== J ==
=== Jason ===
See Gary and Jason, above.

=== Jane and Rod ===
Jane
- Little Britain character
- Portrayed by: Matt Lucas
In-universe information
- Husband: Rod
- Daughters: Katie

Rod
- Little Britain character
- Portrayed by: David Walliams
In-universe information
- Wife: Jane
- Daughters: Katie

Appearances: Series 1 episode 2

Jane and Rod have a daughter who is in a coma, and use their motionless child as a decoy to get celebrities to meet them. David Soul visits them in the first skit, but they only appear to be interested in him and not their child. In the next skit Les McKeown visits them to sing them some of his songs, which they say their child wants to hear despite being motionless.

They appear in a Series 1 deleted scene, going through a list of celebrities due to visit them.

== K ==
=== Des Kaye ===
Des Kaye
- Little Britain character
- Portrayed by: David Walliams
In-universe information
- Occupation: Children's TV host Retail employee

Catchphrase: "Wicky Woo!", "Top of the morning, where's me breakfast?" (as Croc O'Dile)
Appearances: Radio Show; Series 1, and Little Britain Live

Des Kaye is a one-time children's TV host who works in a DIY store. He is in denial and has not come to terms with the fact he is no longer on TV. He is often seen pestering the other members of staff with his puppet called Croc O'Dile, and his frequent sayings of "wicky woo". The Series 1 DVD contains a deleted scene showing Des visiting a children's hospital and accidentally unplugging a patient's life support machine while trying to play some cheerful music on a tape recorder.

He appears on the radio series, and the best of Little Britain Radio show 2-disc set. According to the Radio series, he was sacked from his "Fun Bus" show because of gross indecency, saying "Are you telling me you've never had a wank in the toilet?". One of the new employees at DIY universe where Des was working at the time claims that he and his sister watched the show during its run, and revealed that a girl lost an eye on the show.

Des Kaye made an appearance on the live show, making him one of only two characters to have had their last appearance on the show in series 1, the other being Ray McCooney. The act involved Des driving around in what is presumably a miniature fun bus and angrily throwing lollipops at the audience. He then proceeds to play a game called "Hide the Sausage", which involves him taking two men from the audience at random, asking them to hide a large sausage on a random body part, and then molest the contestant who he thinks has the sausage until a loud siren goes off.

=== Reverend Jesse King ===
Reverend Jesse King
- Little Britain character
- Portrayed by: Matt Lucas

Catchphrase: "Hallelujah!"
Appearances: Series 2, episode 6

Reverend Jesse King is a Black American preacher on a foreign exchange with the vicar of a small village church in Britain. He states that he is "from the ghetto", loudly encourages the congregation to "fight the power", and attempts to cure a man's cough using faith healing. When this fails, he gives the man some cough sweets instead.

== L ==
=== Dr Lawrence ===
Dr Lawrence
- Little Britain character
- Portrayed by: Matt Lucas
In-universe information
- Occupation: Doctor

Catchphrase: "Have you met Anne, by the way?"
Appearances: Every sketch with Anne in it.

Dr Lawrence is the Doctor in charge of Anne's progress. He rarely makes a fuss about Anne's childish behaviour and is only seen being angry at her once, when she was going to chuck his daughter's guinea pig out the window, which she did moments later.

=== Leonard ===
Leonard
- Little Britain character
- Portrayed by: David Walliams

Appearances: Series 3, episodes 2 and 6

Leonard is a man who works in a retirement home. He goes to great lengths to ensure comfort for certain inhabitants, mainly himself.

=== Officer Lindsay ===
Officer Lindsay
- Little Britain character
- Portrayed by: Matt Lucas
In-universe information
- Occupation: Retired police officer

Appearances: Radio Show; Series 1, episode 2

Officer Lindsay appears only once in Series 1. He is a retired police officer in the town of Scoffage, who gives driving lessons. After persuading his student to drive at law-breaking speeds, he promptly pulls the car over, goes to the driver's window and interrogates the student for speeding as if he were still a policeman. Lindsay drives a brown Austin Allegro on which he has crudely painted the word "Police", he also wears a policeman's uniform, claiming all his other clothes were in the wash.

=== Liz and Clive ===
Liz
- Little Britain character
- Portrayed by: David Walliams

Clive
- Little Britain character
- Portrayed by: Matt Lucas

Appearances: Radio Show; Series 1, episodes 2, 4 and 8

Liz and Clive are a middle-aged couple who spend a lot of time eating in their local Chinese restaurant. Throughout these sketches, Liz loudly and endlessly claims that she had been a bridesmaid at Mollie Sugden's wedding, which angers and annoys Clive, especially when Liz makes him listen to her rather than talk to an old classmate of Paul McCartney's (the man is played by Ted Robbins, McCartney's real-life cousin).

In the final sketch involving these characters, Liz is still endlessly ranting about being Sugden's bridesmaid when Sugden comes to the restaurant, causing Liz to suddenly get agitated and try to leave. Clive then approaches Sugden (with Liz trying almost physically to stop him) and she denies any knowledge of Liz, as her friend Helen had been her only bridesmaid and she doesn't know anyone called Liz. At this point, Liz suddenly stabs and kills her with a knife, revealing that she had been fabricating her claims of being Sugden's bridesmaid.

=== Sebastian Love ===
Sebastian Love
- Little Britain character
- Portrayed by: David Walliams
In-universe information
- Occupation: Aide to the Prime Minister of the United Kingdom

Catchphrase: "Whateva!'", "Whaaaa(t)!?", "Yes, Prime Minister", "No, Prime Minister", "Bitch!"
Appearances: Radio Show; Throughout entire series

Aide to the Prime Minister, Sebastian holds a badly-concealed homosexual crush on his boss. Wildly jealous of anyone who takes the attention of the PM, Sebastian does everything in his power to bring the attention back to himself. He often "accidentally" finds himself in sexually suggestive positions with his boss, who is usually very patient with (and largely oblivious to or tacitly accepting of) his advances. He is also very defensive of his boss when he comes under fire from the press or general public (for instance, when some people present a petition saying that they want the PM to resign, he tears it up and throws it in their faces without showing it to anyone). In the finale of Series 2, he tries to kiss the PM but is at first unsuccessful and weeps. When questioned if he has a crush on his boss, he denies it, then kisses his boss. He believes that his feelings for the PM are mutual, as he occasionally seduces other men to make the PM jealous.

David Walliams has said that Sebastian Love was inspired by Peter Mandelson. By the time of Little Britain USA, Sebastian has risen to the post of PM, and has transferred his affections to the new US president and his jealousy to the first lady. In the Little Brexit radio special, Sebastian is depicted as an aide to Boris Johnson, gleefully mocking his personal appearance before resigning.

=== Lou and Andy ===
Lou Todd
- Little Britain character
- Portrayed by: David Walliams
In-universe information
- Occupation: Carer

Main Article: Lou and Andy

Andy Pipkin
- Little Britain character
- Portrayed by: Matt Lucas

Catchphrase: Andy: "I want that one...", "I don't like it", "I look a pillock", "Yeah, I know!"; Lou: "Bit of a kerfuffle!" "Are you sure?"
Appearances: Throughout entire series

Lou Todd is Andy Pipkin's carer but is often taken advantage of by Andy in various ways, although deep down Andy loves Lou. These include Andy's demanding things then rejecting them when they are done for him (or when they are given to him), and Andy's ability to walk and perform complex physical activities while out of his wheelchair while Lou is not looking.

Andy is often dismissive and unkind to other characters, and kills Lou's replacement, Mrs Mead, by pushing her off a cliff when she becomes too strict for him. The pair are the longest serving members of the cast of characters having appeared in every episode except the TV pilot and the radio series.

The names come from two characters in a Rock Profile sketch, supposedly Lou Reed and Andy Warhol.

== M ==
=== Mr Mann ===
Mr Mann
- Little Britain character
- Portrayed by: David Walliams

Appearances: Radio Show; Since Series 1

Mr Mann is a customer who shops in a store (which varies in the merchandise it sells from episode to episode) run by Roy. He would usually ask for ridiculously specific items in the shop (such as "a painting of a disappointed horse" in Series 3 Episode 2). Roy would then call to his unseen wife in the back room, Margaret, for assistance. Mr Mann appeared in only one episode in the first series, but was a regular character in the second and third series. He is typically dressed in a grey raincoat, dark striped tie and black trousers. These sketches are some of the more traditional in the series, relying upon word play and surrealism. Early versions of the sketch feature Roy being unable to provide Mr Mann with his request due to it being too specific, and attempting to provide him with a substitute, which he may refuse for a trivial reason which is important to him.

In later sketches, Roy became accustomed to his requests and was sometimes able to provide them. Mr Mann himself does not have any catchphrase (while Roy and Margaret do) and often delivers comedic content by making ludicrous suggestions to resolve a problem (such as asking whether a long-dead writer would be prepared to re-write his book and cut out all the "Os" to make the book shorter). In Little Britain Abroad, he visits a shop in Morocco with a Moroccan counterpart of Roy and asks for Pirate Memory Games, which was the first thing he ever asked for at Roy's shop in the British version, but is promptly evicted. When requesting a David Baddiel costume for a fancy dress party, although Roy manages to improvise a costume for him, Mr Mann rejects it as he "looked nothing like [David Baddiel]" despite looking like the spitting image of him when he emerged from the changing room (played by Baddiel himself).

In one episode, he asks for "a record of James Last playing Nelly Furtado's hits on a banjo with a picture on the cover of James with his hands open showing stigmata" and Roy has the exact record he asked for.

In another episode, Mr Mann asks for a book and is being very specific about it, then asks if he's being too specific and Roy tells him that he is. He then asks "have you got any books?", to which Roy replies "Well, yes, we've got hundreds of them." Mr Mann says "I'll take them, please," and proceeds to buy the store's entire inventory, despite claiming to be blind.

Walliams appears in a cameo in the film Run Fatboy Run as a character similar to Mr Mann.

=== Margaret ===
Margaret
- Little Britain character
- Portrayed by: Stirling Gallacher (Voiceover)
In-universe information
- Occupation: Shop owner

Appearances: Margaret is always off-screen, but she has been included since Series 1
Catchphrase: See Roy below

Margaret and her husband, Roy, own a shop frequented by Mr Mann. She is unseen throughout all the series and helps Roy when he calls to her from behind the counter. She usually takes a long time to reply whenever Roy calls out to her. One episode reveals that she is unseen because she has no arms or legs.

=== Mark and Tom ===
Mark and Tom
- Little Britain USA character
- Portrayed by: David Walliams/Matt Lucas
In-universe information
- Occupation: Bodybuilders

Appearances: Little Britain USA
Mark and Tom are stereotypical American bodybuilders with enormous muscles, tiny penises and a tendency to boast to each other about their most recent workouts and sexual encounters. Despite talking about being with other women, they are shown to have homoerotic tendencies toward each other and often frolic about naked to the eyes of everyone in the locker rooms (which gives them erections at one point). They never mention their names onscreen making it hard to find out which is which, and in the last of their sketches they have had operations which gives the one played by Lucas a long tube of a penis and the one played by Walliams a woman's genitalia.

=== Dame Sally Markham ===
Dame Sally Markham
- Little Britain character
- Portrayed by: Matt Lucas
In-universe information
- Occupation: Author

Appearances: Series 1
Catchphrases: "The End", "How many pages?"

Dame Sally Markham is a wealthy, famous romantic novelist, whose preferred method of writing involves dictating her novel to her secretary (Miss Grace, played by David Walliams) to type out, while lying on her sofa with her pet Bichon Frise and a box of chocolates. This is a reference to the novelist Dame Barbara Cartland, whose preferred writing method was dictation in similar circumstances.

Unlike Cartland's novels, however, Dame Sally's stories typically fall well short of the required length, and she will use drastic (and often illegal) methods in an effort to lengthen them, such as having the characters over-extend their interjections (such as "Yahoooooooooooo"), integrating excerpts from the radio, plagiarizing extracts from Lady Chatterley's Lover, or having Miss Grace type the entire Bible into her novel. In one instance, when she tried to lengthen it using her own imagination, she barely got past 76 pages and could not think of anything else to write, so she decided to pause with it and start a new one, which consisted only of title (The Lady in Mauve), Chapter One and "The End".

As well as having bizarre ways of lengthening her books, Dame Sally also has some rather peculiar topiary designs outside her house, such as a hand pulling the middle finger, a penis and some breasts.

=== April May and Neville Maddox ===
April May
- Little Britain character
- Portrayed by: David Walliams
In-universe information
- Occupation: Paramedic

Neville Maddox
- Little Britain character
- Portrayed by: Matt Lucas
In-universe information
- Occupation: Paramedic

Appearances: Radio Show and Series 1

April and Neville are two workers for Saint Tom Ambulance, who, in their first appearance, are shown to go into an opera house to help a man who's having a stroke. April always offers the victims various candy mints (which replace the required medical paraphernalia in her bag).

In one clip April gets Neville dismissed, by shifting the blame of having the mints to him. At the start of the final radio episode April met a fellow volunteer named Roy who used cigarettes. The two of them argued over each other's methods until they agreed on menthols when a woman collapsed. They can sometimes be found standing outside of theatrical agent Jeremy Rent's office watching a mime artist.

=== Mildred and Connor ===
Mildred and Connor
- Little Britain USA character
- Portrayed by: David Walliams and Matt Lucas

Appearances: Little Britain USA
Catchphrases: "We didn't know any different!"
Mildred is a "stereotypical Grandma" with a strong Deep South accent. She and her grandson Connor often chat about uneasy issues concerning what Connor has heard of or been involved in, such as drug testing, racism and homosexuality. Mildred then reveals certain strange details of her past, such as drug habits or homosexuality or incidents involving racism. When talking about drugs, she speaks to Connor as if he should've known better, but defends herself when mentioning her own experiences, claiming that "we didn't know any different." When mentioning all the drug habits she's ever had, she claims to be 28 years old (right after Connor comments that, despite her drug habits, she seems rather healthy and well-aged). In another sketch, she recalls a black man running for mayor and winning, only to be shot when it was discovered he was also Jewish. In their final sketch, Connor admits to being gay, only to be called a "faggot" by Mildred after initially implying she was tolerant towards homosexuals.

=== Ray McCooney ===
Ray McCooney
- Little Britain character
- Portrayed by: David Walliams
In-universe information
- Occupation: Hotel owner

Appearances: Radio Show; Series 1 and Little Britain Live
Catchphrase: "A-Yeeeees!", "Ye know too much!", "Maybe I did and maybe I didn't"

Scottish owner of a hotel who speaks and acts like an Elizabethan fantasy character, even though he is often seen speaking and behaving perfectly normally. He answers questions from customers in a diffident manner using riddles, "spells", and a (intentionally badly dubbed) flute, which he refers to as a "piccalillo". He also refers strangely to ordinary objects, such as the radio, which he calls the "talking noisy box". His eccentric behaviour often annoys and confuses his guests. However, in his final appearance, two officers from the Inland Revenue service used it against him, tricking Ray into making overdue tax payments. His hotel is opposite IKEA.

In the pilot episode, this character's name was "Roy" and his appearance was that of a chef at the "Aberdoone Stook Hoose" (Aberdeen Steak House). He also played a metal flute rather than his "Piccalillo".

It is said in the series 2 script book that since series 2, Ray has been continually wandering around asking people why he isn't in the second (or third) series.

The name is a tribute to farce writer Ray Cooney.

=== Mrs. Mead ===
Mrs. Mead
- Little Britain character
- Portrayed by: Imelda Staunton

Appearances: Series 3 Episode 6

Mrs. Mead was a typical devout Irish Catholic woman, who was Andy's temporary caretaker, when Lou went to the Isle of Wight following the death of his mother (to look after his father and arrange his mother's funeral). Andy was "badly" treated by Mrs. Mead; who didn't fall for his ruse, and had to clean the house (which in Mrs. Mead's opinion, was a "pig sty"). She hit him thrice, to prove he couldn't feel anything in his legs. Behind her back he yelled in pain.

She also made him eat some "disgusting" stew, and as an alternative to a choc ice, he had to eat a pear for pudding. Mrs. Mead forbade Andy from watching "Des and Mel". For their own "entertainment", she sang Onward, Christian Soldiers which Andy strongly disliked.

Mrs. Mead then took Andy to a cliff, where he had to wheel himself. She told him that she thought Lou had been too soft with him, and told him that he had to do cooking and cleaning, no more TV or chocolate and crisps. When she was telling him he needed a job, Andy was tired of her unfair treatment, and killed Mrs. Mead by pushing her off the cliff. Though her intentions were well meaning, she took it too far and made it like she was going to live with Andy forever, even though she knew Lou was to return the following day.

=== Denver Mills ===
Denver Mills
- Little Britain character
- Portrayed by: David Walliams
In-universe information
- Occupation: Silver medallist

Appearances: Radio Show; Series 1, episodes 3, 5 and 6

Denver Mills is a former silver medallist (gold medallist in the radio drama) in the 400 metres at the 1984 Los Angeles Olympics, who now acts as a guest speaker at various events. His speeches are always politically or factually incorrect, confusing and often offensive to the audience, such as his speech at a police dinner "...maybe being an Olympic athlete isn't so different from being a police officer. First of all, we both get a lot of practise running after black guys". In a typical sketch, he will be on his way to give his speech, but upon learning a detail in his speech is considered offensive, confusing or is not factually correct, he will proceed to throw a page of his speech away, until he is left with his greeting and dismissal. Once, he found out he would not only be meeting people with leprosy, but also hugging them, and, suddenly reluctant to do his speech, he threw himself out of the car after a discussion about lepers. He regularly goes on about his achievements, but gets little response for it.

Mills' US equivalent is Bing Gordyn, the eighth man to walk on the moon and the first to do so with a moustache. The two are both Walliams characters, both have had some amazing achievement that they go on about, but fail to receive praise for.

In reality the medal Mills is said to have won was actually won by the late Ivorian athlete Gabriel Tiacoh.

=== The Minstrels ===
The Minstrels
- Little Britain character
- Portrayed by: David Walliams and Matt Lucas

Played By: David Walliams and Matt Lucas
Appearances: Series 1, Episodes 1 and 3

The Minstrels are two minstrels who are constant targets of quasi-racial discrimination. They are refused a room at a bed and breakfast, and are criticized in radio broadcast by a government official. One of the cut sketches shows the Minstrel played by David Walliams being denied a job to which he replies, "Is it because I'm a minstrel?"

=== Myfanwy ===
Myfanwy
- Little Britain character
- Portrayed by: Ruth Jones
In-universe information
- Occupation: Barmaid

Appearances: Radio Show; Since Series 1, in most of the sketches with Daffyd Thomas in them

Myfanwy is the barmaid of a local pub (called "The Scarecrow and Mrs. King") and best friend to Daffyd Thomas and often serves him Bacardi and Coke. She is very keen to help him find a gay partner, even going as far as to close her bar so he can have a gay night (which she promptly regrets because he orders all the gays who turn up to leave).

In later episodes, it is shown that she is in a homosexual relationship and about to enter into a civil partnership with Rhiannon. In Little Britain Abroad, Myfanwy opens a gay bar on Mykonos in Greece, but it does not fare well because Daffyd does not hand out flyers to the locals. It is also revealed in Little Britain Abroad that she speaks almost perfect Greek. At the end of Series 3, she is seen walking with Daffyd to the train station and she cries when he tries to leave for London.

Her name is a reference to the series' producer, Myfanwy Moore.

== N ==
=== Narrator ===
Narrator
- Little Britain character
- Portrayed by: Tom Baker

Appearances: Unseen. Narrates every episode
Catchphrase: Opens every episode with "Britain, Britain, Britain!" or something similar, such as "Brighton, Brighton, Brighton" and closes every episode with a mispronounced "goodbye" (e.g., "good-tie" or "good bile"). The closest he ever came to saying it the right way was when he said "goodbyes".

The narrator opens and closes every episode and provides a voice-over between many of the sketches to introduce the upcoming characters, announcing the time in a ridiculous manner, such as "nought o'clock", announcing an impossible time or date, such as "one two o'clock" or "It's a crisp morning in Octember", or replacing the hour with a person's name, such as "half past Oliver" and also fictitious names for locations around Britain, such as villages called "Bruise", "Achey Balls", and the "Mike McShane Estate". He will also give directions to certain places such as a McDonald's in a very strange location and "a town just southeast of Northwestshire".

The narrator delivers comedic monologues in many voice-overs by making unorthodox claims about Britain, its people or its history (such as "we invented the cat"), stating the obvious (such as "Here are some facts about Britain you may not know. 1. Britain is a country, 2. Britain is called Britain, 5. Britain."), or by breaking the fourth wall, such as saying Anthony Head is not the real Prime Minister and he's "that guy out of Buffy". He will also make ironic statements (such as in Little Britain Abroad: "I went to Mykonos once. I loathed it...Too many gays! My boyfriend and I got the first flight home!" He also mentions in one episode that he was born without genitals.) Sometimes he would make very strange comments about a location such as "the children of Britain are notoriously stupid and must attend school" and "if you have a verucca you would like to share, then go to your local swimming pool".

He often makes surreal statements, such as "I must go now because I am about to reach orgasm", or "I do love an election... in fact, I'm having one right now", at the end of one of the episodes. At the end of one episode, shorter than the others, he remarked: "This show has ended a little earlier than usual, because a man is trying to take my clothes off, and I must ask him why".

Also, during the Marjorie Dawes sketches, he expresses much contempt for overweight people, such as calling them "vermin", or expressing a desire to have them arrested, removed from the country, spat on or shot dead. However, in one such sketch he states that he would strangle the overweight people himself, but he can't because he's "too fat". In an Emily Howard sketch, he says that he is wearing a beautiful dress that belonged to his father; he routinely introduces Emily as "rubbish [or not very good, or some similar phrase] transvestite Emily Howard".

In the final episode he says "Brighton, Brighton, Bri... oh wait, Britain, Britain, Britain!". At the end he says that Little Britain is the best show ever and says he is "some kind of god that must be worshipped as such".

=== Newsagent ===
Newsagent
- Little Britain character
- Portrayed by: Matt Lucas

Appearances: Series 2 episode 4

The Newsagent made only one appearance in Series 2. In the sketch, set in an ordinary British off-license, a customer (portrayed by David Walliams) comes in and, being the only other person in the shop, is forced to do his shopping under the gaze of the newsagent, who attempts to make conversation by commenting on each of the items that the customer takes (for instance "Thirsty?" upon the customer taking a drink from the fridge, or "Hoping to write letter to friend or relative?" upon the customer taking a notebook). At the end of the sketch, after a few moments of awkward dithering, the customer reaches up to the top shelf of the magazine racks, where the pornographic ones are kept, prompting the shopkeeper to ask; "Planning a wank?" Embarrassed, the customer changes his mind and instead goes to pay for the items he has taken. The opening scene of the sketch shows that he allows a maximum of 200 students in his shop at one time.

== P ==
=== Pat and Don ===
Pat
- Little Britain character
- Portrayed by: David Walliams

Don
- Little Britain character
- Portrayed by: Matt Lucas

Appearances: Series 3, episodes 2 and 3

Catchphrase: Pat: "Don, don't have that", Don: "I'll have one of those, my friend."

Pat and Don are a couple who eat at a local Indian restaurant, which has an unusually fast service. The dishes are delivered as soon as the couple is finished ordering, and even so, the waiter will sometimes apologise for the delay.

Don always orders the spiciest dish offered to him, saying with enthusiasm that he loves his food spicy. However, he often finds the dish a little too hot for his tastes and it then causes him to spout catchphrases from a variety of 1970s and 1980s TV shows such as "Super match game, super match game, super match game", "Godzilla, doo doodle doo, Godzilla doo doodle doo, Godzilla doo doodle doo and Godzooky" and "Mr Spencer!" Pat clearly only likes mild food.

=== Sandra and Ralph Patterson ===
Sandra Patterson
- Little Britain character
- Portrayed by: David Walliams

Ralph Patterson
- Little Britain character
- Portrayed by: Adam Donkin
In-universe information
- Occupation: Actor

Appearances: Series 1, episodes 4, 6 and 7

Sandra Patterson is a stage mother who is unusually determined for her son Ralph (which she pronounces as "Raif", a reference to Ralph Fiennes) to get into acting. She is also very boastful and nasty to whoever she comes across. Unfortunately, her son never gets a part and, every time he fails, Sandra loses her temper and usually takes it out on whoever is nearby, unfortunately, often her son.

They appeared in the radio series under the names of Sandra and Olivier Laurence, a play on the name of the actor Laurence Olivier. She goes to such lengths to get him parts, that she pretends it's his birthday, that he's dying, and even threatening to "tell 'em you touched him!".

=== Pedro ===
Pedro
- Little Britain character
- Portrayed by: David Walliams

Appearances: Series 2, The Comic Relief Special

Pedro is the Spanish, cross-dressing boyfriend of Dewi, Daffyd's brother.

Pedro was with Dewi when he came out to Daffyd as gay, and Daffyd was shocked to find out Pedro was a man, and was gay also. Pedro appeared in Comic Relief, acting as room service when Daffyd was interviewing Elton John. Pedro's character was likely based on David Walliams' impersonation of Ricky Martin.

=== Sid Pegg ===
Sid Pegg
- Little Britain character
- Portrayed by: David Walliams

Appearances: Series 3, episodes 4 and 5
Catchphrases: "Wife, [name of food], go!", "Britain fights back! (fist in air)"

Sid Pegg is a nosy and rude Neighbourhood Watch leader who takes his job very seriously. As there is no real crime in his area, his meetings can be about anything from the Gipsy Kings (whom he believes to be the "actual kings of the Gypsy") to the fact that a gang of "yobs" have kicked an empty can of Lilt down the road. He will frequently call out commands to his wife preparing dinner, in the format of "Wife, [name of food], go!". He has a moustache similar to that of Nazi leader Adolf Hitler, and a photograph of Winston Churchill in his living room where the meetings take place. When asking for assistance from other members of the watch, he always chooses Lloyd, a short man who appeared on The Weakest Link (a fact Sid continually mentions).

=== Piano Player ===
Piano Player
- Little Britain character
- Portrayed by: David Walliams
In-universe information
- Occupation: Pianist

Appearances: Series 1, episodes 1, 3, 6 and 8

The Piano Player is an unnamed man who plays at the Uncle Albert Hall. He pauses during his recitals to say or do mindless things, such as checking where his shopping bag is, to read a text message and to tell someone that he forgot to set the video and ask when Sainsbury's closes, before resuming the recital as if nothing had happened. The actual pianist was Simon Callaghan, now a professional classical musician, who was studying at the Royal College of Music at the time.

An American counterpart (also played by Walliams) appears in a deleted scene of the US adaptation of the show. He is seen reading out of a porn magazine, which is causing him to play a faster tempo.

=== Judy Pike ===
See Maggie Blackamoor and Judy Pike, above.

=== Gerald Pincher ===
Gerald Pincher
- Little Britain character
- Portrayed by: Matt Lucas
In-universe information
- Wife: Celia Pincher
- Sons: Harvey Pincher

Appearances: Series 2, episodes 1, 2, 4, and 6; Little Britain USA, episode 2, 3 and 6
Catchphrase: "Come on, Harvey!"

Gerald Pincher is the father of Harvey Pincher. He is a crusty, conservative, upper class Brit, yet he is also warm and friendly. In Series 2 he has mousy brown hair and in Little Britain USA he has red hair. He appears to be unperturbed by Harvey's infantile desire for his mother's breast milk ('bitty'). In Little Britain USA he is seen changing Harvey's diaper. He appears to be interested in the Battle of Culloden. In Series 2 it is revealed that Gerald does not approve of vegetarianism; when informed about the need for a vegetarian option at Harvey and Jane's wedding he responds "Oh, bloody vegetarians! String up the lot of them, I say!". In Little Britain USA he expresses his dislike of modern art, "Hope they don't have too much of that "modern art"!"

=== Harvey Pincher ===
Harvey Pincher
- Little Britain character
- Portrayed by: David Walliams
In-universe information
- Father: Gerald Pincher
- Mother: Celia Pincher
- Wife: Jane Pincher

Appearances: Series 2
Catchphrase: "I want bitty!" or simply "Bitty!"

Harvey Pincher can be best described as a 25-year-old upper-class mummy's boy. He insists on "bitty" (breast milk) from his mother Celia (played by Geraldine James) even though he is an adult – much to the dismay of his prospective wife and her parents, so when they were speaking and they saw the "bitty", they would start stuttering and speaking rather slowly.

The sketches follow his engagement to Jane, through to their wedding day, which he interrupts near the end, saying "Bitty" instead of "I Do", gesturing for his mother to come up so he can have some of her breast milk. His parents do not seem even remotely perturbed by his behaviour.

Harvey Pincher and his parents (without his new wife) return in Little Britain USA, visiting some American relatives, who are equally shocked by his breast-feeding. In their final sketch, Harvey's mother Celia overhears the relatives insulting them behind their back about the breast-feeding and is offended. It is also revealed that Harvey is burped by Celia, wears a nappy and Gerald changes him.

=== Andy Pipkin ===
See Lou Todd and Andy Pipkin

=== Vicky Pollard ===
Vicky Pollard
- Little Britain character
- Portrayed by: Matt Lucas
In-universe information
- Mother: Shelly Pollard

Played by: Matt Lucas
Appearances: Radio Show; Starting in Series 1
Catchphrases: "Yeah, but no, but yeah, but... (and sometimes repeats this a few times)", "... or sumthin' or nuffin'", "I wasn't even supposed to be there, so SHUT up!", "Don't be giving me the evils!", "Oh my God! I sooo can't believe you just said that!", "Yeah, well, (s)he ain't got nuffin' to do with it, anyway, so just leave him/her out of it!" as well as coming up with gossip unrelated to her situation which usually ends with "Anyway, don't listen to him/her cos [further unrelated gossip]".

Vicky Pollard is a teenage girl who is intended to be a parody of chavs living in the West Country at the time Matt Lucas was studying at the University of Bristol. When challenged about something, she comes up with gossip that has nothing whatsoever to do with whatever problem she is in at the time, although she claims to be "getting there". She also speaks very quickly which, together with the gossip she comes up with, usually confuses or agitates the person in question. She dresses in a dirty, pink-coloured Kappa tracksuit. Her place of residence throughout the series was a fictitious town called Darkley Noone, which is shown to be in Bristol. For instance, she refers to places within the Bristol area, such as Fishponds, the Broadmead Shopping Centre and Wookey Hole (which is actually just outside Wells, but is a short drive from Bristol). She also speaks with a strong Bristolian accent and a lisp, for instance pronouncing "borstal" as "borthtal".

Vicky Pollard went to school in the first series. In the first and second series, she was accused of shoplifting, became pregnant (and swapped the baby for a Westlife CD) and was sentenced to borstal where she bit someone called Jackie Hayes (a counterpart of Vicky played by Walliams). In the third series, she works for a sex hotline and pretends she is a lesbian with three girlfriends named "Ferrero", "Rocher" and "Twix", was hired to babysit and had a wild party in the house while the parents were away and tried to get money from a forged lottery ticket. In Little Britain Abroad she was shut in a Thai prison for smuggling heroin and her mother, Shelly Pollard (played by Dawn French), made an appearance in court saying that Vicky got into a bad crowd at the age of three. Vicky was sentenced to 10 years for this offence (her mother gets 20 for annoying the judge). Her black boyfriend, Jermaine, made a brief cameo appearance in a sketch in Series 2.

In Comic Relief does Little Britain Live, supermodel Kate Moss played Vicky's twin sister "Katie Pollard", and declared that Vicky was the "pretty one" and Katie was the "easy one". She is shown in various episodes to be a chav girl seeking to get pregnant to get a council house: – in one episode, she is shown enviously referring to an acquaintance of hers who is only 9 years old, but has a council house of her own and 3 children. On the episode where she takes a job at a sleazy sex hotline, she is shown pushing along 6 daughters in buggies all dressed identically to her, whilst in the babysitting episode, she also mentions that she has 6 children of her own. She often says "I have 6 babies by 7 different blokes."

In Little Britain USA, she is sent to boot camp in Utah after being thrown out of Disney World for beating up the Aristocats and setting fire to the Peter Pan ride. She enrages the coach, jabbering away during rollcall and refusing to follow orders. This behaviour continues until the other girls run off to get their first assignments and Vicky stays behind to express concern over one of the girls being possibly lesbian. She is told to "run" by the coach. In another sketch, she smokes in the bathroom and her hair catches fire (she is saved by the concerned coach). In her final sketch in the series, she is in hospital on life support after jumping off the church roof. The coach is shown to be very caring towards her.

== R ==
=== Rachel and Nicola ===
Rachel
- Little Britain character
- Portrayed by: David Walliams

Nicola
- Little Britain character
- Portrayed by: Matt Lucas

Appearances: Series 2, episode 6

Rachel (Walliams) and Nicola (Lucas) are two single women looking for love, who go to lunch together and keep track of dates and potential boyfriends by exchanging Polaroid photos of the men's genitals.

=== Jeremy Rent ===
Jeremy Rent
- Little Britain character
- Portrayed by: Matt Lucas
In-universe information
- Occupation: Agent

Appearances: Radio Show; Since Series 1
Catchphrase: "I'll tell um you're busy."

Jeremy is Dennis Waterman's theatrical agent who, while on the phone, at the slightest hint of disagreement, shouts the last word and hangs up the phone.

He often struggles to get Dennis to agree to take conventional acting roles, whereas Dennis is only interested in writing and singing theme tunes. In one sketch, the usual appearance of regular sized things being huge to Dennis is swapped so when Jeremy gives Dennis a pen, it appears regular size to him and when he gives it back, the pen is gigantic to Jeremy.

=== Robot careers advisor ===
Robot careers advisor
- Little Britain character
- Portrayed by: David Walliams (Voiceover)
- Species: Robot
In-universe information
- Occupation: Careers advisor

Appearance: Series 1

The robotic careers advisor, who works in the same Kelsey Grammar school as Mr. Cleaves, makes one appearance. In it, a student, who is very realistic about his career opportunities in the future, comes into his office to discuss his desire to become a caterer or engineer. However, the robot reveals to him just how realistic his career opportunities are – according to the robot, there will be no jobs for humans in the future. Somewhat confused, the boy leaves with a booklet explaining everything the robot has said, a warning over his untucked shirt and a reminder that the advisor is a robot.

=== Florence Rose ===
Florence Rose
- Little Britain character
- Portrayed by: Matt Lucas
In-universe information
- Other names: Fred Brown

Florence Rose is an aspiring transvestite and companion of Emily. He is even less convincing as a transvestite than Emily, in that he deliberately keeps his moustache; at one point being referred to as "a short fat bloke with a moustache" whilst attempting to purchase a dress.

Emily is teaching Florence how to be a lady in the second series, during which she regularly makes mistakes. In the last episode of Series 3 it is revealed that he is married and his real name is Fred. Their Nationwide advertisement gives his full name as "Fred Brown".

=== Roy ===
Roy
- Little Britain character
- Portrayed by: Matt Lucas
In-universe information
- Occupation: Shop owner

Appearances: Radio Show; Since Series 1, in all sketches with Mr Mann
Catchphrase: Roy's catchphrase is a conversation with his wife:

Roy: (Following Mr Mann's request) "Oh, I'm not sure; Margaret will know. [turns to the back of the store] Margaret! Margaret!"
Margaret: (after a long pause) "Yes?"
Roy: "There's a gentleman here looking for [then repeats Mr Mann's request, often verbatim]."
These lines are usually followed by Margaret saying she is unsure, though she always has an alternative which Roy may have in stock, much to his own surprise, although Mr Mann may then refuse for some trivial reason.

Roy owns a store (that sells different items each episode) where Mr Mann always shops. His wife Margaret helps run the store but is never seen. He has stated that he hates Mr Mann because of his specific requests, and is sometimes shown to be reluctant to serve him. On one occasion, when Mr Mann complained about a picture he had just purchased, Roy's response was "Get out or I will strangle you". The long pause between Roy's calling to Margaret and her response was referenced in one sketch when, as soon as Roy had called to Margaret, he and Mr Mann both sat down, to read their books while waiting for her response.

=== Robert ===
Robert
- Little Britain character
- Portrayed by: Matt Lucas
In-universe information
- Occupation: Chancellor of the Exchequer

Appearances: Series 1 Episode 6, Series 3 Episode 6

Robert is the Chancellor of the Exchequer to the prime minister, Michael Stevens. He is, according to the prime minister, very distant to him and this makes the prime minister think that he does not like his policies. This, in turn, causes Robert to stand in the leadership elections. However, in the last episode of Series 3, when the prime minister resigns, it is announced that Robert will be the new prime minister, which leaves Sebastian, the prime minister's aide (who has always taken a dislike to Robert, calling him "fat and Scottish") in tears.

He is based on Gordon Brown, who at the time was in the same position.

== S ==
=== Michael Stevens ===
Michael Stevens
- Little Britain character
- Portrayed by: Anthony Head
In-universe information
- Other names: Prime Minister
- Occupation: Prime Minister of the United Kingdom

Played by: Anthony Head

Appearances: Since Series 1, in all but one scene with Sebastian Love

The prime minister and the object of Sebastian's affection. Based heavily on the then real-life British prime minister Tony Blair, there are several references to the political scene of the time. Michael has a tumultuous relationship with Sebastian, playing on Blair's strained relationship with Peter Mandelson.

One scene depicts the prime minister conducting difficult talks with the president of the United States, where the president tries to compel the prime minister to follow his position, referring to Blair's following of the policy of the Bush administration on the then-ongoing war with Iraq. There is also an episode which depicts the revelation of the prime minister's extramarital affair many years earlier, playing on John Major's affair with Edwina Currie.

He "retires" at the end of Series 3, to Sebastian's horror, which is alluding to the long expected and much anticipated handover of Tony Blair to his chancellor, Gordon Brown, which took place in real life two years after the prime minister retired in the series.

David Walliams stated that Anthony Head got the role because "next to Steve Martin, he's the only man I'll ever turn gay for."

== T ==
=== Mr. T look-alike ===
Mr. T look-alike
- Little Britain character
- Portrayed by: Matt Lucas

Appearances: Series 2, Episode 3

One of the few characters based on a real person, the sketch involved a Mr. T look-alike, complete with gold chains and mohawk, who claimed to have never heard of the muscle-bound star or even seen The A-Team, despite the fact he also drank milk and drove a van identical to the one from the show.

=== Daffyd Thomas ===
Daffyd Thomas
- Little Britain character
- Portrayed by: Matt Lucas
In-universe information
- Brothers: Dewi Thomas

Played by: Matt Lucas

Appearances: Radio Show; Series 1 onward
Catchphrases: "Everybody knows I'm the only gay in the village", "Homophobe!", "Bacardi and Coke, please, Myfanwy", "I don't think so", "I'm gay! Get over it!", "Gay Rights... For Gays!"

Daffyd /ˈdæfɪð/ Thomas, who lives in the small Welsh village of Llanddewi Brefi, is a self-proclaimed gay man who dresses in a vast variety of tight PVC and latex rubber clothing and proudly proclaims that he is "the only gay in the village".

In fact, there is a huge gay community in his village and the surrounding area, but he refuses to acknowledge or associate with them. Instead, he frequently proclaims his homosexuality as a means to draw attention to himself, and has almost no (if any) homosexual experience, appearing instead to be more terrified by the thought of it than having any desire to seek it out – in Little Britain USA he exclaims "I can't have sex with a man, I'm gay!". There is only one sketch in which he seemed to admire a handsome man he thought was gay. He secretly longs to be victimised for his supposed homosexuality and often brands anyone who speaks to him as homophobic, even if all they said was "Hello".

Daffyd is frequently shown to be very ignorant, and prone to making offensive and politically incorrect statements about other homosexuals. He claims that "lesbians don't count" and tells another that she is "far too attractive" to be a lesbian. He spends most of his time in the village pub talking to barmaid and best friend Myfanwy, played by Ruth Jones. Myfanwy, who is later revealed to be in a lesbian relationship herself with girlfriend Rhiannon, is eager to help him with his apparent disengaged love life, and encourages him to meet other gay men or groups, all of whom he rejects or insults. She continues to try to help him despite his repeated bluntness. Many sketches end with him leaving his local pub after claiming that his village is completely homophobic.

He also has a habit of organising gay-related events, such as a gay society, and then refusing other gays entry, by simply declaring that they are not genuinely gay. He has a mother, played by Ruth Madoc, and father who are not bothered by his self-proclaimed homosexuality, much to his chagrin. They in fact have many gay relatives. In Little Britain Abroad, he is shocked to learn from Myfanwy that his mother is in love with her aunt, and he even has a gay brother named Dewi, played by James Corden, who has a Spanish boyfriend named Pedro. In the final episode of Series 3, he decides to leave Llandewi Brefi for London because he felt he was an out gay man. He decided not to go, because he learnt from Myfanwy what a gay man could do in London.

In one episode of Little Britain series 3, Daffyd is seen trying to become an MP, representing his own political party, the "Gay Rights for Gays Party". If he wins the local election, he claims he would turn Llanddewi Brefi Park into a 24-hour gay cruising zone, merely by adding statues of Colin and Justin, and that he would demolish the Llanddewi Brefi Home of Retirement and replace it with a gay sauna. Most people seem to back Daffyd. The elderly lady in the sketch reveals she is a lesbian herself, causing Daffyd to faint.

In Little Britain Abroad, he ruins the opening night of Myfanwy's gay bar on Mykonos in Greece because he hands out fliers to a 5-year-old tourist girl and a Greek nun instead of to other gay people, though the nun later reveals herself to be a lesbian. He is also noticeably curious about what being homosexual is actually like when he questions a homosexual (Walliams) on a Mykonos beach.

Daffyd appears in Little Britain USA, in which he attends an American university and claims to be "the only gay on campus". In his first appearance, a gay student (Walliams) hijacks Daffyd's "Gay society" stand, feeling that he could do a better job at running it than Daffyd. He then starts admitting more gay people while Daffyd looks on in shock. This is the first time that another gay person has taken over his attempt to prove the fact that he is the only one. He later discovers that he is not the "only gay on campus" when he confronts two lesbians who are living next door for making too much noise when he is trying to sleep.

He appears in the deleted scenes, in which he protests to his English lecturer about the apparent lack of gay writers in their syllabus. He handcuffs himself to a desk and swallows the key, only to discover that they have been studying Truman Capote and Tennessee Williams, two famous gay writers.

=== Dudley and Ting Tong ===
Dudley Punt
- Little Britain character
- Portrayed by: David Walliams

Ting Tong Macadangdang
- Little Britain character
- Portrayed by: Matt Lucas

Appearances: Since Series 3
Catchphrase: Ting Tong: "Pwease, Mr. Dudwey!", "My name Ting Tong, Ting Tong Macadangdang.", "Did you have good time?"
Dudley: "Maybe just... ONE more night..."

Dudley Punt ordered a Thai bride from a magazine. However, Ting Tong Macadangdang is quite the opposite of the slim, beautiful bride Dudley was expecting. He is not very happy about this, but for sex, he continues to let her stay "one more night". Dudley is very sarcastic and has a West Midlands accent. Ting Tong, on the other hand, is very loud and claims not to be able to understand Dudley a lot of the time, and refers to him as "Mister Dudwey".

The sketches generally involve Dudley and Ting Tong's relationship blossoming, only for Ting Tong to reveal a secret about herself. Dudley would then order her out. She would then try to convince him through various methods to let her stay, to which he always gives in. Ting Tong has many secrets: it is revealed she is a lady-boy, born Tong Ting Macadangdang. She admitted that she comes from Tooting in London, not from a remote Thai village called Pong Pong, as she'd originally claimed.

Ting Tong eventually invited her entire family to live in Dudley's home, turned it into a Thai restaurant and forced him to spend Christmas Eve standing on his porch, waiting for it to close. Later, in Little Britain Abroad, after finally getting married, they go on a honeymoon to Belgium, where they stay with Dudley's brother, who has married a beautiful Russian bride called Ivanka (which is actually not a Russian given name) who claims to be 18 years old. During this sketch, Dudley flirts with Ivanka, which makes Ting Tong jealous, so she plays Dudley and his brother a pornographic video Ivanka starred in, revealing she is not a virgin as she originally claimed.

=== Toilet Cleaner ===
Toilet Cleaner
- Little Britain USA character
- Portrayed by: Matt Lucas
In-universe information
- Occupation: Cleaner

Appearances: Little Britain USA Episode 3
Catchphrase: "I don't look at penis"

The toilet cleaner is a one off in Little Britain USA. She seems to look at penises. Despite repeatedly denying that she looks at penises, she says to a man "Sorry about your penis".

=== Viv Tudor ===
Viv Tudor
- Little Britain character
- Portrayed by: Matt Lucas
In-universe information
- Occupation: Manager

Appearances: Series 2
Catchphrase: "Ohhhh, he was gorgeous!"

A recurring character in Series 2, Viv Tudor is the manager of a jewellery shop. In her first appearance, the police are at her shop, investigating a recent break-in. When the police sergeant (David Walliams) asks her to describe the robbers, she is only capable of saying "Ohhhh, he was gorgeous!", not helping the investigation.

In her final appearance, Viv is at the police station, where six possible robbers are given an identity parade. She claims that the final suspect was the robber, and says that they're "Ohhhh, gorgeous!"

== W ==
=== Warren ===
Warren
- Little Britain character
- Portrayed by: Matt Lucas

Appearances: Series 3, episode 4

Warren appears in a hospital, apparently on his deathbed. Throughout the sketch, he goes quiet and appears to be dead. However, as the family begin to mourn, he speaks again to reveal himself as still alive, and "still waiting". Towards the end of the sketch, he appears to die, as he does not speak for a long time.

As his family starts to mourn, he gets out of bed and announces he needs to use the toilet, shocking the family. He also appears in deleted scenes from series 3, still waiting to die. It is obviously a long time since the last sketch and the family is preparing to leave. As they say goodbye and tell the nurses to call if anything happens, Warren calls "Stay where you are..."

=== Matthew Waterhouse ===
Matthew Waterhouse
- Little Britain character
- Portrayed by: David Walliams
In-universe information
- Occupation: Inventor

Appearances: Radio Show; Series 1, episodes 4, 5, 6 and 7
Catchphrase: "Here's one for ya!; "Got another one!"; (slaps his hand on the desk) "How's that for starters?"

Matthew Waterhouse is an inventor who presents very silly and crazy ideas for musicals, board games, impersonators and cereals, with a sketch on each subject, and usually barges into the person's office uninvited.

Several examples of his ideas are breakfast cereal "Sugar Poofs: Real gay men frosted with sugar." or kissogram "John McCarthy-o-gram: I come in, handcuff myself to the radiator and talk about my time as a hostage in the Lebanon!". The character's name is a reference to the actor of the same name who played the character of Adric in the television science-fiction series Doctor Who in the early 1980s.

=== Dennis Waterman ===
Dennis Waterman
- Little Britain character
- Portrayed by: David Walliams
In-universe information
- Occupation: Actor

Appearances: Radio Show; Series 1 and 2 and Little Britain Live
Catchphrase: "Oooh, that's nice!" "I'll do it! Long as I get to write the theme tune, shing the theme tune..." "Gonna write the theme tune, sing the theme tune..."

Dennis Waterman is a very small actor who, unfortunately, always rejects proposed parts, insisting that he should "write the theme tune, sing the theme tune" every time, much to the chagrin of his theatrical agent, Jeremy Rent. However, when he is offered to reprise a role in a TV series in which he gets to "write the theme tune, sing the theme tune", he responds "No thanks, I've moved on." His small size is seen when Jeremy hands him a small object, such as a 50p coin or a letter, that turns out to be larger than Dennis. His full height is seen in his final appearance – a minute figurine that looks similar to him is used.

He bears little resemblance to the real Dennis Waterman, except that his "theme tunes" are based on the Minder theme tune that Waterman sang himself (among others), but didn't write. The character is inspired by Lucas and Walliams having met Waterman at an awards ceremony and been surprised to see that he was shorter than he appeared to be during fight scenes in Minder and The Sweeney. The real Dennis Waterman was quoted as saying "I did watch it, but I never saw that bit. I just saw a lot of some bloke dressed up as a woman".

The Little Britain Live stage show included a mock ad-lib sequence in which Lucas and Walliams question the logic of their caricature, which in fact bears little resemblance to Waterman. In a special recording of the sketch for Comic Relief 2007, Waterman himself appears on stage and confronts the two, forcing them to admit that in voice and appearance, there is no resemblance. He is forced to concede that he has often written and sung the "theme tune" of programmes in which he has appeared.

=== Whitelaw ===
Whitelaw
- Little Britain character
- Portrayed by: David Walliams

Appearances: Series 1 episode 6
Catchphrase: "Do you know if anyone died in it?"

Whitelaw appears only once in the entire Series, at her local charity shop. She is seen to browse through the clothes rack, and when she finds something she likes, she always asks the shopkeepers if anyone died in the clothes she is holding.

When Whitelaw finds some pale blue silk pyjamas, the assistant keeper (Matt Lucas) says that, just the day before, an elderly lady came in with her husband's clothes, saying he died in his sleep. Whitelaw then buys them.

== Deleted scenes characters ==
Many characters from deleted scenes never got an appearance in the series, either due to time constraints, lack of laughs from the audience or due to a sometimes offensive story.

=== Bus Passenger ===
Played by: Matt Lucas
Appearances: Series 3 Deleted scenes

A man with the appearance of a Beanie from the town of Frottage is generally seen on a bus on its way to Dung market centre. He likes to blurt out tunes at random, to the annoyance of the person sitting next to him.

=== Stewie and Dale ===
Played by: Matt Lucas and David Walliams respectively
Appearances: Series 3 Deleted Scenes

Stewie and Dale are two Scottish men working in their local supermarket. Whenever he sees a random person at a certain area of the shop, Dale will say that the person is a celebrity (he has said Whoopi Goldberg, Danny DeVito, and Macaulay Culkin), then Stewie will prove him wrong.

=== Barry Edwards ===
Played by: David Walliams Appearances: Radio show; Series 1 Deleted Scenes

Barry Edwards' sketch consists of him with a new answerphone. When he tries to enter the "please call me back" message, he tries many different ways of saying "Hi, this is Barry. I'm sorry I can't answer your call; please call me back", including a serious tone, an excited and zany tone, a quiet, ominous whisper, an impersonation of Sir Ian McKellen and a faux Welsh accent, but each time ends up dissatisfied with the result and recording a new message. His final message is an incoherent whine, which he ultimately settles on.

=== Eugene ===
Played by: David Walliams
Appearances: Series 2 Deleted Scenes
Catchphrase: "Correct", "Incorrect", "Does that smell?", "Is it smelling?"

Eugene appears in three clips of the deleted scenes. He is a musician, who plays nothing more than a triangle, and speaks with a South African accent. He is irrationally sensitive and always answers with the words "Correct" for positives and "Incorrect" for negatives. In each clip, he vandalizes colleagues' instruments for minor things that affected him.

In his appearances, he: bends a flute because the owner in question trod on his toes; flattens the brass section's instruments because one of them said his lunchbox smelled, and saws a double bass in half because the owner was reading his Daily Express. After that occasion, he is fired from the orchestra, which results in him igniting petrol all over the orchestra, proclaiming "I am correct, they are incorrect!".

=== Roland ===
Played by: David Walliams
Appearances: Series 2 Deleted scenes
Catchphrase: "Is it Pornoo...?"
Roland is a farm boy with a love of pornography, or "Pornoo" as he calls it. His suggestions for almost any question he is asked is types of pornography, much to the concern of his family. The start of his sketches often sees him putting women's clothing on a pig. At the end of each sketch, he will take something off the kitchen table before returning to his room.

=== Ruth and her Mother ===
Played by: Matt Lucas and David Walliams
Appearances: Series 2 deleted scenes
Catchphrase: Ruth: "Muuuummmm!" Mother: "Meet me in the back in 5 minutes!"

Ruth is a girl who works in a motorway cafe with her mother. Her mother tries to get her daughter to fall in love with someone. She first makes her daughter do a dance in front of the customer, then later, makes her have sex with them.

=== Shy Hotel Guest ===
Played by: David Walliams
Appearances: Little Britain USA Deleted scenes
Catchphrases: "Pass it under the door, please", "Pervert...!"

Appearing in 2 deleted scenes, the Hotel Guest is never seen in person as he doesn't like to show his face, having his treatments and breakfasts slid under the door in unusual fashions. When the person he is addressing attempts to catch a glimpse of him under the door, he will shout "What are you lookin' at, you pervert!?". It is revealed in the second sketch that he has a third ear, the most likely explanation for his hate of other people seeing him.

=== Kim and Jill ===
Played by: Matt Lucas and David Walliams
Appearances: Series 2 Deleted scenes
Catchphrase: "He's handy, is he?"

Jill is a young woman who enjoys dating men of certain professions to exploit their skills and giving her free upgrades, while she and her mother Kim laze about in the sun before they finish their work and she dumps them afterwards. Jill dates handy men like a plumber, a Sky electrician and an elderly Sikh gardener. The first two lightly accept her rejection but the very last is more eager, prompting Jill to actually ask him if she can "throw him in a pond".

=== Douglas Stirling ===
Played by: David Walliams
Appearances Series 1 Deleted scene
Catchphrase: Oh, so it's "The warmth of the sun reminded them that they were alive", [suggests a ridiculous ending]

Douglas Stirling is an author who is seen at a restaurant, meeting up with a potential publisher, played by Stirling Gallacher. He has written a masterpiece of nearly 700 pages, up until the last line which reads "Anyway, readers, I must go now, as my Mum is calling me for my tea". The publisher encourages him to change this line, although Douglas doesn't understand what is wrong with it. He then suggests other ridiculous endings, such as "The warmth of the sun reminded them that they were alive, ok bye" or "I've got to go now, as Graham Norton is just starting. Lots of love, Douglas". Douglas reluctantly agrees to remove the last line, to the publisher's relief, only for her to discover a new problem: the first line reads "Dear Mum".

=== Benjy ===
Played by: David Walliams
Appearances Series 2 Deleted scenes
Catchphrase: "My black friends"
Benjy is a white man with an unusual obsession with Black British men, whom he refers to as his "Black friends". Only one sketch featuring him was made, in which he is seen to host a party whose invitees consist solely of this demographic. He is uncomfortable when one of the invitees brings along a White British friend of his, played by Lucas, and only admits him after getting an absolute reassurance that the friend is not a racist. Throughout the sketch, he is seen to make constant politically incorrect remarks, to the discomfort of his party guests.
