= See Saw Margery Daw =

Traditional song

Nursery rhyme
- Published: c. 1765

"See Saw Margery Daw" is an English language nursery rhyme, folk song and playground singing game. The rhyme first appeared in its modern form in Mother Goose's Melody, published in London in around 1765. It has a Roud Folk Song Index number of 13028.

== Lyrics and melody ==
A common modern version is:

See Saw Margery Daw,
Johnny shall have a new master;
He shall earn but a penny a day,
Because he can't work any faster.

The name Jacky is often replaced with Johnny or Jack.

The melody commonly associated with the rhyme was first recorded by the composer and nursery rhyme collector James William Elliott in his National Nursery Rhymes and Nursery Songs (1870).

In an episode of Gomer Pyle USMC, Gomer sang this song while showing another Marine how to rake.

The lyrics are also sung in the Bluey episode "Seesaw".

== Meaning and origin ==
The seesaw is one of the oldest 'rides' for children, easily constructed from logs of different sizes. The words of "See Saw Margery Daw" reflect children playing on a see-saw and singing this rhyme to accompany their game. No person has been identified by the name Margery Daw and so it is assumed that this was purely used to rhyme with the words 'seesaw'. One possibility is Margery Tawney, a widow owed money for repayment of a debt owed her late husband. During Wat Tyler's rebellion in 1381, she was afforded an audience with Richard II, but later her elder son was beaten to death, thus a 'see-saw' in her own life.

The rhyme may have its origins as a work song for sawyers, helping to keep rhythm when using a two-person saw. In his 1640 play The Antipodes, Richard Brome indicated the connection between sawyers and the phrase "see saw sacke a downe". The game of see-saw in which two children classically sit opposite each other holding hands and moving backwards and forwards first appears in print from about 1700.

The Opies note that "daw" means "a lazy person", but in Scots it is "an untidy woman, a slut, a slattern" and give this variant of "Margery Daw" from Cornwall:

See-saw, Margery Daw,
Sold her bed and lay on the straw;
Sold her bed and lay upon hay
And pisky came and carried her away.
