= Olwen Fouéré =

Irish actress and writer (born 1954)

- Born: 2 March 1954 (age 72); Galway, Ireland
- Occupation: Actor

Olwen Fouéré (born 2 March 1954) is an Irish actress and writer/director in theatre, film and visual arts. She was born in Galway, Ireland to Breton parents Yann Fouéré and Marie-Magdeleine Mauger. In 2020, she was listed at number 22 on The Irish Times list of Ireland's greatest film actors.

== Career ==
Fouéré works in English and French, and has made numerous appearances at the Abbey Theatre, the Gate Theatre in Ireland, the Royal National Theatre in England, the Bouffes du Nord in Paris, at Brooklyn Academy of Music New York, Sydney Theatre Company Australia and Shakespeare Theatre Company. In 1980 she formed Operating Theatre, an avant-garde theatre company with composer Roger Doyle. She later established an artistic entity called TheEmergencyRoom for the development of her ongoing projects which have included the creation of her internationally acclaimed RIVERRUN (her adaptation of the voice of the river in James Joyce's Finnegans Wake); her staging of Lessness by Samuel Beckett (Barbican, Galway International Arts Festival and Project Arts Centre, Dublin); her translation and production of Danse, Morob, written for her by the French writer Laurent Gaudé and her translation and performances of Sodome, My Love (in association with Rough Magic) also by Laurent Gaudé; a film project co-directed by Kevin Abosch from a script by Anne Enright titled Cassandra:fragments of a playscript.

== Stage ==
Play	Role	Director	Author	Venue	Company	Year
The President	The First Lady	Tom Creed	Thomas Bernhard	Gate Theatre, Dublin and Roslyn Packer Theatre	Gate Theatre and Sydney Theatre Company	2024
iGirl	Sole performer	Catriona McLaughlin	Marina Carr	Abbey Theatre, Dublin		2021
The Last Season	Winter	Danielle Micich	Sydney Festival Carriageworks	Force Majeure		2021
Unwoman III	Unwoman (solo)	The Rabble	-	Dublin Fringe Festival and Melbourne	-	-
Blood Wedding	Mother	Yaël Farber	Frederico Garcia Lorca adaptation by Marina Carr	Young Vic Theatre, London		2019
Nous, l’Europe, Banquet des Peuples	Ensemble	Roland Auzet	Laurent Gaudé	Festival d’Avignon		2019
Ballyturk	3	Enda Walsh	Enda Walsh	Abbey Theatre 2017 and St Ann's Warehouse, New York	Landmark Theatre Productions and Galway International Festival	2017, 2018
What if Women Ruled the World?	The President	-	Yael Bartana	Manchester International Festival at Aarhus and Volksbuhne Berlin	-	-
Salome	Nameless Woman	-	Yaël Farber	-	Shakespeare Theatre Company Washington DC and National Theatre, London	-
Left Behind: Songs of 1916 Widows	Narrator	-	Simon O’Connor and Michelle O’Rourke	-	National Concert Hall, Dublin	-
The Fever	-	-	Fintan O’Toole	-	Belfast Festival	-
Death at Intervals	Death	Kellie Hughes	-	-	Galway International Festival / Dublin Theatre Festival	-
Embodied	Performer	Megan & Jessica Kennedy	-	Junk Ensemble Production	-	-
Riverrun	Solo performance	Olwen Fouéré (with co-director Kellie Hughes)	Olwen Fouéré	TheEmergencyRoom/ Galway International Arts Festival and international tour	-	-
The Importance of Being Earnest	Dr. Chausuble	Antony McDonald	Composer: Gerald Barry	NI Opera	-	-
A Tender Thing	Juliet	Selina Cartmell	-	Siren Productions	-	-
Maria de Buenos Aires	El Duende	Conor Hanratty	-	-	Cork Opera House	-
The Rite of Spring/Petrushka	the Cailleach	Michael Keegan-Dolan	-	English National Opera andSadler's Wells	-	-
The Taming of the Shrew	–	–	–	–	–	–
The Broken Heart	–	Mark O'Rowe	–	Various	Abbey Theatre World Tour	2011
Terminus	A	Mark O'Rowe	Mark O'Rowe	Various	Abbey Theatre World Tour	2011
The Rehearsal, Playing the Dane	Gertrude	Gavin Quinn	William Shakespeare	–	Pan Pan theatre	–
Medea	sole Chorus	Selina Cartmell	translated by Robin Robertson	–	Siren productions	–
Sodome, My Love	Celle de Sodome	Laurent Gaudé	Lynne Parker (translated by Olwen Fouéré)	Project Arts Centre, Dublin	–	–
The Rite of Spring	the Cailleach	Michael Keegan-Dolan	–	London Coliseum	Fabulous Beast and ENO	–
Under Glass (The Test Tube)	–	Suzy Willson and Paul Clark	Alice Oswald	–	Clod Ensemble	–
Paula Spencer, La Femme Qui Se Cognait Dans Les Portes	solo	Michel Abécassis	Roddy Doyle (translated by Ian Monk and Isabelle D. Phillippe)	Théatre de l'Eveil tour including Bouffes du Nord, Paris, and Project Arts Centre, Dublin	–	–
Woman and Scarecrow	Woman	Selina Cartmell	Marina Carr	Abbey Theatre	–	–
The Bull	Maeve	Michael Keegan-Dolan	–	Dublin Theatre Festival 2005, Barbicanbite 2007, speilzeiteuropa08	Fabulous Beast	–
Catastrophe	The Assistant	Selina Cartmell	Samuel Beckett	Barbican	Gate Theatre Beckett Festival	–
Titus Andronicus	Tamora	Selina Cartmell	Shakespeare	Project Arts Centre, Dublin	Siren Productions	–
Here Lies	Antonin Artaud	Selina Cartmell	–	Galway Arts Festival 2005, Dublin and Paris 2006	Operating Theatre	–
A Cry from Heaven	Ness	Olivier Py	Vincent Woods	Abbey Theatre, Dublin	–	–
The Plough and the Stars	Mrs Gogan	Ben Barnes	Seán O'Casey	Abbey Theatre, Barbicanbite and Cork Opera House	–	–
The Playboy of the Western World	Widow Quinn	Ben Barnes	John Millington Synge	Abbey Theatre (USA Tour)	–	–
Passades	self and explorer	Selina Cartmell	–	Lee's Cash 'n Carry, Dublin	Operating Theatre	–
La Musica	Woman	Selina Cartmell	Marguerite Duras	SS Michael and John, Dublin	Siren Productions	–
The House of Bernarda Alba	Augustine	Martin Drury	Federico Garcia Lorca, trans. Sebastian Barry	Abbey Theatre, Dublin	–	–
Macbeth	Lady Macbeth	Michael Barker-Caven	Shakespeare	Dublin and Irish tour	Second Age	–
Lessness	solo	Judy Hegarty-Lovett	Samuel Beckett	Gare StLazare Irl	Kilkenny Arts Festival, Cottesloe Theatre, Dublin Fringe Festival	–
Bailegangaire	Dolly	Tom Murphy	Tom Murphy	Abbey Theatre, Dublin	–	–
Chair	solo	Johnny Hanrahan	Operating Theatre	Peacock Theatre, Dublin	Operating Theatre	–
The Playboy of the Western World	Pegeen Mike	Niall Henry	John Millington Synge	Abbey Theatre, Dublin	–	–
Peer Gynt	Solveig	Conal Morrison	Henrik Ibsen (trans. Frank McGuinness)	Royal National Theatre, London	–	–
Romeo and Juliet	Lady Capulet	Tim Supple	Shakespeare	Royal National Theatre, London	–	–
The Tempest	Ariel	Conal Morrison	Shakespeare	Abbey Theatre, Dublin	–	–
Life Is a Dream	Rosaura	Calixto Bieto	Caldéron de la Barca (translated by John Clifford)	Edinburgh Festival '98, Barbican '99, BAM,'99	–	–
The Wake	Mary Jane	Patrick Mason	Tom Murphy	Abbey Theatre and Edinburgh Festival	–	1988–1999
By the Bog of Cats (World Premiere)	Hester Swane	Patrick Mason	Marina Carr	Abbey Theatre (Dublin Theatre Festival '98)	–	1988
Angel/Babel	solo	Leon Ingulsrud	Operating Theatre	Project@the mint, Dublin	Operating Theatre	1999
Lady Windermere's Fan	Mrs Erlynne	Alan Stanford	Oscar Wilde	Gate Theatre Dublin and Charleston Spoleto Festival	Company	1997–1998
The Electrocution of Children	Margot	Brian Brady	Chris Lee	Abbey Theatre, Dublin	–	–
Fair Ladies at a Game of Poem Cards	Empress and Moon	John Crowley	Chikamatsu Montsaemon, trans. Peter Oswald	Royal National Theatre	–	–
Play and Come and Go	–	Bairbre Ni Chaoimh	Samuel Beckett	Gate Theatre and Lincoln Center, New York	–	–
Double Helix	Bickerstaffe	John Crowley	–	Peacock Theatre, Dublin	–	–
Six Characters in Search of an Author	Mme. Pace	John Crowley	Luigi Pirandello, trans. Tom Kilroy	Abbey Theatre, Dublin	–	–
Slaughter City	Cod	Ron Daniels	Naomi Wallace	–	Royal Shakespeare Company, The Pit	–
The Mai (World Premiere )	The Mai	Brian Brady	Marina Carr	Abbey Theatre, Dublin	Company	Year
Old Times	Anna	Kevin Billington	Harold Pinter	Gate Theatre, Dublin	Gate Theatre Pinter Festival	–
Sheep's Milk on the Boil	The Inspector of Wrack	Tom Hickey	Tom Mac Intyre	Abbey Theatre, Dublin	–	–
Hamlet	Hamlet	Michael Sheridan	Shakespeare	Project Arts Centre, Dublin	–	–
The Tempest and Macbeth	Ariel and Lady Macduff	Michael Bogdanov	Shakespeare	World tour	English Shakespeare Company	–
The Cherry Orchard	Varya	Michael Bogdanov	Anton Chekhov	Gate Theatre, Dublin		
Salome	Salomé	Steven Berkoff	Oscar Wilde	Gate Theatre '88; Edinburgh Festival '89; Spoleto '90		1988, 1989, 1990
The Master Builder	Hilde Wangel	Paul Unwin	Henrik Ibsen	Bristol Old Vic, Bristol		1989
Dancing at Lughnasa	Agnes	Patrick Mason	Brian Friel	Phoenix and Garrick Theatre, London	–	–
The Master Builder	Hilde	Paul Unwin	Henrik Ibsen, trans. Michael Meyer	Bristol Old Vic	-	-
Bajazet	Atalide	Peter Eyre	Racine, trans. Allan Hollinghurst	Almeida Theatre, London	-	-
Cathleen Ni Houlihan & The Cuchulainn Cycle	Cathleen and Aoife	Jim Flannery	William Butler Yeats	Abbey Theatre, Dublin	-	-
Peer Gynt	Solveig and Anitra	Patrick Mason	Henrik Ibsen, trans. Frank McGuinness	Gate Theatre, Dublin	-	-
Les Liaisons Dangereuses	La Presidente de Tourvel	Ben Barnes	Christopher Hampton (after Laclos)	Gate Theatre, Dublin	-	
Uncle Vanya	Sonya	Paul Unwin	Anton Chekhov	Gate Theatre, Dublin	-	-
Fool for Love	May	Ray Yeates	Sam Shephard	Abbey Theatre, Dublin	-	-
Innocence	Caterina	Patrick Mason	Frank McGuinness	Gate Theatre, Dublin	-	-
The Playboy of the Western World	Pegeen Mike	Garry Hynes	John Millington Synge	Druid Theatre New York Tour '86	-	-
The Pantagonal Dream	solo	David Heap	Sebastian Barry	Damer Theatre, Dublin	Operating Theatre	-
The Diamond Body	solo	Brendan Ellis	Aidan Mathews	Dublin, Bush Theatre London '84, Avignon Festival’86, Glasgow Mayfest '87	Operating Theatre	-
The Antigone	Antigone	Michael Scott	Aidan Mathews	Project Arts Centre, Dublin	-	
The Old Woman Broods	Kazimierz Braun	-	Tadeusz Rosewicz	Project Arts Centre, Dublin	-	-
Extremities	Marjorie	Julian Plunkett-Dillon	William Mastrosimone	Project Arts Centre, Dublin	-	-
The Morning After Optimism	Anastasia	Michael Scott	Tom Murphy	Project Arts Centre, Dublin	-	-
Three Bunches of Blood and a Lump of Fog	-	Michael Scott	Sean MacCarthy	Project Arts Centre, Dublin	-	-
Three Sisters	Irina	Stephen Rea	Anton Chekhov, trans. Brian Friel	Field Day 1981	-	-
Twelfth Night	Viola	Christopher Fitzsimon	Shakespeare	Irish Theatre Company	-	-
Withering Hypes and Bubblegum	-	Thom MacGinty	-	-	Grapevine touring company	-
The Glass Menagerie	Laura	Paul Brennan	Tennessee Williams	Gate Theatre, Dublin	-	-
Riders to the Sea	Kathleen	Brendan Ellis	John Millington Synge	Players Theatre, Dublin	-	-
Not I	solo	Brendan Ellis	Samuel Beckett.	Focus Theatre, Dublin	-	-
The Fall of the House of Usher	Madeleine	Peter Sheridan	Steven Berkoff (from Edgar Allan Poe)	Project Arts Centre, Dublin	-	-
The Hostage	Teresa	Sean Treacy	Brendan Behan	Project Arts Centre and Eblana Theatre, Dublin	-	-
Marat/Sade	Charlotte Corday	Michael Sheridan	Peter Weiss	Project Arts Centre, Dublin	-	-
Famine	Maeve	Tom Murphy	Tom Murphy	Project Arts Centre, Dublin	-	-
Dev	Mrs DeValera	Peter Sheridan	-	Project Arts Centre, Dublin	-	-
The Risen People	Annie	Jim Sheridan	James Plunkett	Project Arts Centre, Dublin	-	-
A Month in the Country	Vera	Mary Elizabeth Burke-Kennedy	Turgenev	Focus Theatre, Dublin	-	-
Endgame	Nell	Sean Treacy	Samuel Beckett	APE Theatre company, Dublin	-	-

== Filmography ==
=== Film ===
Year	Title	Role
2011	This Must Be the Place	Mary's mother
2012	The Other Side of Sleep	Maggie
2015	The Survivalist	Kathryn
2017	Beast	Theresa Kelly
2018	Mandy	Mother Marlene
2018	Fantastic Beasts: The Crimes of Grindelwald	Melusine
2019	Animals	Maureen
2019	Sea Fever	Ciara
2020	Zone 414	Royale
2021	She Will	Jean
2022	Texas Chainsaw Massacre	Sally Hardesty
2022	The Northman	Ashildur Hofgythja
2022	Joyride	Sideline Sue
2023	All You Need Is Death	Rita Concannon
2023	Catching Dust	Copperhead
2023	Falling Into Place	Judy
2024	Sunrise	Ma Reynolds
2024	Tarot	Alma Astryn
2024	The Watchers	Madeline Kilmartin
2025	The Actor	Old Lady Track
TBA	The Last Girl	Dottie Evans

=== Television ===
Year	Title	Role	Notes
1984	A Painful Case	Mary Sinico	Television film
1985	The Irish R.M.	Miss Malone	Episode: "In the Curranhilty Country"
1986	Screen Two	Young Nun	Episode: "Time After Time"
1987	When Reason Sleeps	Celia Dunbar	Episode: "The Scar"
1990	Hard Shoulder	Ella Burke	Television film
1996	Ballykissangel	Sister	Episode: "Fallen Angel"
1998	The Ambassador	Television interviewer	Episode: "A Cluster of Betrayals"
2010	Above Suspicion	Mrs Hughes	Episode: "The Red Dahlia: Part 1"
2018	Nightflyers	Constance Brighthead	Episode: "The Sacred Gift"
2020	Brassic	Margaret	Episode: "The Intruder"
2020	Cursed	Yeva	2 episodes
2022	Derry Girls	Sheila	Episode: "The Haunting"
2022	The Crown	Oonagh Shanley-Toffolo	Episode: "No Woman's Land"
2024	The Tourist	Niamh Cassidy	6 episodes
2024	Halo	The Mother	4 episodes

== Visual arts ==
Olwen Fouéré features in several works by artist James Coleman which continue to be shown internationally. Their first collaboration So Different and Yet... was created in 1980. She worked with artist Andrew Duggan on "unravel_róis" on Inis Oirr, Dublin Biennial and University of Lyon. She collaborated with artist Jesse Presley Jones representing Ireland at the Venice Biennale 2017 on a film installation 'Tremble Tremble'.

== Honours ==
Olwen Fouéré was conferred with an Honorary Doctorate (Doctor of Philosophy - Honoris Causa) from Dublin City University in April 2016

== Awards ==
- The Irish Times Theatre Awards Special Tribute 2013 for outstanding achievement and contribution to theatre in Ireland.
- The Herald Archangel Award 2014 for "riverrun" and her outstanding contribution to the Edinburgh Festivals.
- 'Best Actress' in the Irish Times/ESB theatre awards 2011 for "Sodome, My Love" by Laurent Gaudé produced by Rough Magic in association with TheEmergencyRoom
- 'Samuel Beckett Award' at the Dublin Theatre Festival for her role as Hester Swane in the world premiere of "By the Bog of Cats" by Marina Carr at the Abbey Theatre 1998.
- 'Best Actress' at the Dublin Theatre Festival 1982

== Nominations ==
- IFTA nomination for 'Best Supporting Actress' in 'The Survivalist' by Stephen Fingleton
- 'Best Actress' in the Irish Times Theatre Awards 2013 for 'riverrun' by TheEmergencyRoom
- 'Best Actress' in the Harvey Awards 1985 for 'The Diamond Body' by Operating Theatre.
- 'Best Actress' in the Irish Times/ESB Theatre awards 1999 for 'By the Bog of Cats' by Marina Carr
- 'Best Actress' in the Irish Times/ESB Theatre awards 2000 for 'Angel/Babel' by Operating Theatre
- 'Best Actress' in the Irish Times Theatre Awards 2006 for 'Titus Andronicus' directed by Selina Cartmell.

== Publications ==
She has contributed to a number of publications on contemporary theatre and performance including:

- The Dreaming Body, edited by Melissa Sihra and Paul Murphy;
- Women in Irish Drama, edited by Melissa Sihra
- Actors Voices: the people behind the performances, edited by Patrick O'Kane
- The Theatre of Marina Carr, edited by Cathy Leeney and Anna McMullan
- Theatre Talk, edited by Lilian Chambers, Ger Fitzgibbon and Eamonn Jordan
- Operating Theatre 1980–2008

== Documentary ==
A documentary of a year in her life, "Theatre in the Flesh" directed by Dara McCluskey, was produced for RTÉ's Arts Lives series in 2005.
