= Belphegor (disambiguation) =

Belphegor is the name of a demon.

Belphegor may also refer to:

== Literature and arts ==
- Belfagor arcidiavolo, a novella by Niccolò Machiavelli written between 1518 and 1527
  - Belphégor (La Fontaine), one of La Fontaine's Fables (1693), adapted from the Machiavelli novella
  - Belfagor, a 1923 Italian opera by Ottorino Respighi, based on the Machiavelli novella
- Belphégor (novel), a 1927 horror novel by Arthur Bernède, and works based on the novel:
  - Belphégor (1927 film), a film by Henri Desfontaines
  - Belphegor, or Phantom of the Louvre, a 1965 French television mini-series
    - Belphegor (comics), comic sequel of the miniseries
  - Belphegor, Phantom of the Louvre, a 2001 French film
  - Belphegor (TV series), a 2001 French animated TV series
- The Curse of Belphegor, a 1966 Franco-Italian film

== Popular music ==
- Belfegore, an early 1980s German gothic new wave band
- Belphegor (band), an Austrian blackened death metal band est. 1991

== Fictional characters ==
- Belfaygor of Bourne, a character in Jack Pumpkinhead of Oz
- Belphegor, a character from the anime/manga Reborn!
- Baalphegor, a female archdevil, consort of Mephistopheles —ruler of the Eighth Layer of Hell— in Dungeons & Dragons.

== Technology ==
- Citroën Belphégor, the popular moniker of a line of French trucks
- PZL M-15 Belphegor, an agricultural jet biplane
- SNCAC NC.3021 Belphégor, French high altitude research aircraft

== Other ==
- Nirodia belphegor, butterfly species

== See also ==
- Belphegor's prime, a palindromic prime number
