= L'École Internationale de Théâtre Jacques Lecoq =

School of physical theatre

Coordinates: 45.4781°N 9.2276°E

École internationale de théâtre Jacques Lecoq
- Type: Theatre school
- Established: 1956
- Location: Avignon, France
- Founder: Jacques Lecoq
- Website: ecole-jacqueslecoq.com

École internationale de théâtre Jacques Lecoq is a school of physical theatre previously located on Rue du Faubourg-Saint-Denis in the 10th arrondissement of Paris. In May of 2023 the school announced its departure from Paris and relocation to Avignon, where its next season training would commence that autumn.

Founded in 1956 by Jacques Lecoq, the school offers a professional and intensive two-year course emphasizing the body, movement and space as entry points in theatrical performance and prepares its students to create collaboratively. This method is called mimodynamics. The school's graduate list includes renowned figures of stage such as Philippe Gaulier of École Philippe Gaulier (who was also an instructor at École Jacques Lecoq), Ariane Mnouchkine of Théâtre du Soleil, Steven Berkoff, and Simon McBurney of Théâtre de Complicité, among others.

== Overview ==
The Lecoq program lasts for two years. Ninety students from all over the world are accepted in the first year, and out of these, thirty will be accepted into the second year. Classes are conducted in French.

=== Two-year program ===
The first year focuses upon observing movement dynamics in the world and in doing so, rediscovering life anew. In the words of Jacques Lecoq:

To mime is to literally embody and therefore understand better. A person who handles bricks all day long reaches a point where he no longer knows what he is handling. It has become an automatic part of his physical life. If he is asked to mime the object, he rediscovers the meaning of the object, its weight and volume. This has interesting consequences for our teaching method: miming is a way of rediscovering a thing with renewed freshness…

His method, called mimodynamics and involving corporeal movement, is not miming in the traditional sense, as the spoken word is involved. The focus and the goals of mimodynamics are widely different from those of miming.

Aside from observing the world anew through the study of natural elements, materials, animals, words, sounds and colours, students also discover themselves anew with the Neutral Mask, an exercise which reveals their habits and tendencies and teaches stage presence.

The second year focuses on exploring major dramatic territories, such as melodrama, buffoon, tragedy, Commedia dell'arte clowning and so on.

=== Classes ===
In general, each day students have three sessions:

1. Movement analysis
    - This includes physical preparation – learning and analysing 20 essential movements, acrobatics, juggling, stage combat, etc.
1. Improvisation
2. Autocours
    - Each Friday, students are asked to work in groups to prepare for a performance upon a certain theme related to their other classwork. The process of collaborative directing is often frustrating at first, but allows students to engage with each other creatively. In this way, students get to know each other extremely well, and also learn to work with others to create a piece of work.

=== Laboratory of Movement (LEM) ===
In addition to the two-year professional course the school also offers LEM, a course which studies space and rhythm through scenography.

== Notable alumni ==
- Isaac Alvarez – choreographer, mime, actor, pedagogue, founder of Théâtre du Moulinage
- Adriana Arango – Colombian actress, writer and producer
- Philippe Avron – actor
- Joey Batey – actor and musician
- Steven Berkoff – playwright and actor
- Kate Brooke – screenwriter
- Chris Channing – performance artist and theatre maker
- Leah Cherniak – Canadian playwright and director
- Salim Daw – Palestinian actor
- Avner Eisenberg – performer and teacher
- Isla Fisher – comedian and actor
- Giovanni Fusetti – theatre pedagogue, founder of Helikos, Florence, Italy
- Philippe Gaulier – clown, teacher and founder of École Philippe Gaulier
- Dean Gilmour – actor and director
- Chris Harris – English pantomime dame, director and writer
- Charlotte Hope – actor
- Sophie Hunter – director
- Toby Jones – actor
- William Kentridge – artist
- Kani Kusruti – actress
- Beejan Land – actor
- Victoria Legrand – singer, musician, member of the band Beach House
- Sergi López – actor
- Alex McAvoy – actor
- Simon McBurney – actor, director and founder of Théâtre de Complicité
- Gates McFadden – actor and choreographer
- Ariane Mnouchkine – director, writer and founder of Théâtre du Soleil
- Adrian Pecknold – founder of Canadian Mime Theatre
- Richard Pochinko – clown, teacher at the Theatre Resource Centre and creator of the Canadian Clowning/Pochinko Clowning Technique
- Yasmina Reza – playwright
- Geoffrey Rush – actor
- Toby Sedgwick – director/actor, choreographer of War Horse
- Julie Taymor – film and Broadway theatre director
- Ayse Tashkiran – movement director and author on movement
- Suzy Willson – director and co-founder of Clod Ensemble

== Sources ==
- Lecoq, Jacques. (2000) The Moving Body. London: Methuen.
- Lecoq, Jacques. A comprehensive overview of his pedagogy, originally published as Le Corps poétique in French
