= Jacques Lecoq =

French theatre pedagogue (1921–1999)

- Born: 15 December 1921; Paris, France
- Died: 19 January 1999 (aged 77); Paris, France
- Occupations: Theatre director, teacher, Practitioner
- Years active: (1945–1999)
- Organization: École internationale de théâtre Jacques Lecoq
- Spouse: Fay Lees

Jacques Lecoq (15 December 1921 – 19 January 1999) was a French stage actor and acting movement coach. He was best known for his teaching methods in physical theatre, movement, and mime which he taught at the school he founded in Paris known as École internationale de théâtre Jacques Lecoq. He taught there from 1956 until his death from a cerebral hemorrhage in 1999.

Jacques Lecoq was known as the only noteworthy movement instructor and theatre pedagogue with a professional background in sports and sports rehabilitation in the twentieth century.

== Life ==
As a teenager, Lecoq participated in many sports such as running, swimming, and gymnastics. Lecoq was particularly drawn to gymnastics. He began learning gymnastics at the age of seventeen, and through work on the parallel bars and horizontal bar, he came to see and understand the geometry of movement. Lecoq described the movement of the body through space as required by gymnastics to be purely abstract. He came to understand the rhythms of athletics as a kind of physical poetry that affected him strongly. Following many of his exercise sessions, Lecoq found it important to think back on his period of exercise and the various routines that he had performed and felt that doing so bettered his mind and emotions. In 1937 Lecoq began to study sports and physical education at Bagatelle college just outside of Paris. He received teaching degrees in swimming and athletics. In 1941, Lecoq attended a physical theatre college where he met Jean Marie Conty, a basketball player of international caliber, who was in charge of physical education in all of France. Conty's interest in the link between sport and theatre had come out of a friendship with Antonin Artaud and Jean-Louis Barrault, both well-known actors and directors and founders of Education par le Jeu Dramatique ("Education through the Dramatic Game"). While Lecoq still continued to teach physical education for several years, he soon found himself acting as a member of the Comediens de Grenoble. While Lecoq was a part of this company he learned a great deal about Jacques Copeau's techniques in training. One of these techniques that really influenced Lecoq's work was the concept of natural gymnastics. This company and his work with Commedia dell'arte in Italy (where he lived for eight years) introduced him to ideas surrounding mime, masks and the physicality of performance. During this time he also performed with the actor, playwright, and clown, Dario Fo.

He was first introduced to theatre and acting by Jacques Copeau's daughter Marie-Hélène and her husband, Jean Dasté.

In 1956, he returned to Paris to open his school, École Internationale de théâtre Jacques Lecoq, where he spent most of his time until his death, filling in as international speaker and master class giver for the Union of Theatres of Europe. The school was eventually relocated to Le Central in 1976. The building was previously a boxing center and was where Francisco Amoros, a huge proponent of physical education, developed his own gymnastic method. Lecoq chose this location because of the connections he had with his early career in sports. The school was also located on the same street that Jacques Copeau was born.

Lecoq trained and later taught alongside Philippe Gaulier of École Philippe Gaulier. Gaulier was an initially a student at École Internationale de théâtre Jacques Lecoq, before becoming an instructor alongside Lecoq for over a decade.

== Teaching style/method ==
Lecoq aimed at training his actors in ways that encouraged them to investigate ways of performance that suited them best. His training was aimed at nurturing the creativity of the performer, as opposed to giving them a codified set of skills. As students stayed with Lecoq's school longer, he accomplished this through teaching in the style of ''via negativa'', also known as the negative way. This teaching strategy basically consists of only focusing his critiques on the poorer or unacceptable aspects of a student's performance. Lecoq believed that this would allow students to discover on their own how to make their performances more acceptable. Lecoq did not want to ever tell a student how to do something "right." He believed that was supposed to be a part of the actor's own experience. The goal was to encourage the student to keep trying new avenues of creative expression. Many actors sought Lecoq's training initially because Lecoq provided methods for people who wished to create their own work and did not want to only work out of a playwright's text.

His training involved an emphasis on masks, starting with the neutral mask. This neutral mask is symmetrical, the brows are soft, and the mouth is made to look ready to perform any action. Lecoq believed that this mask allowed his students to be open when performing and to fully let the world affect their bodies. This is because the mask is made to seem as if it has no past and no previous knowledge of how the world works. This is supposed to allow students to live in a state of unknowing in their performance. The aim was that the neutral mask can aid an awareness of physical mannerisms as they get greatly emphasized to an audience whilst wearing the mask.

Once Lecoq's students became comfortable with the neutral masks, he would move on to working with them with larval masks, expressive masks, the commedia masks, half masks, gradually working towards the smallest mask in his repertoire: the clown's red nose. The larval mask was used as a didactic tool for Lecoq's students to escape the confines of realism and inject free imagination into the performance. The mask is essentially a blank slate, amorphous shape, with no specific characterizations necessarily implied. The expressive masks are basically character masks that are depicting a very particular of character with a specific emotion or reaction. The mask is automatically associated with conflict.

The last mask in the series is the red clown nose which is the last step in the student's process. Because this nose acts as a tiny, neutral mask, this step is often the most challenging and personal for actors. Lecoq believed that every person would develop their own personal clown at this step. He believed that to study the clown is to study oneself, thus no two selves are alike. Three of the principal skills that he encouraged in his students were le jeu (playfulness), complicité (togetherness) and disponibilité (openness).

The French concept of 'efficace' suggesting at once efficiency and effectiveness of movement was highly emphasized by Lecoq. Lecoq viewed movement as a sort of zen art of making simple, direct, minimal movements that nonetheless carried significant communicative depth. Lecoq emphasizes that his students should respect the old, traditional form of commedia dell'arte. But Lecoq was no period purist. He believed commedia was a tool to combine physical movement with vocal expression. He emphasized the importance of finding the most fitting voice for each actor's mask, and he believed that there was room for reinvention and play in regards to traditional commedia dell'arte conventions.

One of the most essential aspects of Lecoq's teaching style involves the relationship of the performer to the audience. Lecoq thus placed paramount importance on insuring a thorough understanding of a performance's message on the part of its spectators. In this way Lecoq's instruction encouraged an intimate relationship between the audience and the performer. Lecoq's pedagogy has yielded diverse cohorts of students with a wide range of creative impulses and techniques.

In collaboration with the architect Krikor Belekian he also set up le Laboratoire d'Étude du Mouvement (Laboratory for the study of movement; L.E.M. for short) in 1977. This was a separate department within the school which looked at architecture, scenography and stage design and its links to movement.

Lecoq wrote on the art and philosophy of mimicry and miming. Therein he traces mime-like behavior to early childhood development stages, positing that mimicry is a vital behavioral process in which individuals come to know and grasp the world around them. Lecoq also wrote on the subject of gesture specifically and its philosophical relation to meaning, viewing the art of gesture as a linguistic system of sorts in and of itself. Lecoq classifies gestures into three major groups: gestures of action, expression, and demonstration.

In 1999, filmmakers Jean-Noël Roy and Jean-Gabriel Carasso released Les Deux Voyages de Jacques Lecoq, a film documenting two years of training at École internationale de théâtre Jacques Lecoq. The documentary includes footage of Lecoq working with students at his Paris theatre school in addition to numerous interviews with some of his most well-known, former pupils.

== Notable students ==
- Annabel Arden, actress
- Hilary J. Bader, screenwriter
- René Bazinet, actor, mime, and clown act creator of Cirque du Soleil
- Steven Berkoff, theatre director, actor and writer
- Malachi Bogdanov, theater director and writer
- Luc Bondy, theatre and opera director
- Peter Bramley, actor, teacher, theatre director, founder of Pants on Fire
- Julian Chagrin, British-Israeli actor and mime
- Chris Channing, performer, designer, and theatre maker
- Avner Eisenberg - performer ("Avner the Eccentric"), teacher
- Isla Fisher, actress
- Oliver Foot and Andrew Simon, co-founders of the Footsbarn Theatre
- Philippe Gaulier, teacher, actor, pedagogue, master-clown
- Toby Jones, actor
- Beejan Land, actor
- Simon McBurney, actor, director, and founding artistic director of Théâtre de Complicité
- Gates McFadden, actress, choreographer
- Ariane Mnouchkine, theater director and founder of Théâtre du Soleil
- Yasmina Reza, playwright and director
- Geoffrey Rush, actor
- Sylvaine Strike, writer, actress, theatre director, co-founder of Fortune Cookie Theatre Company
- Julie Taymor, director, designer, and choreographer
- Suzy Willson, director and founder of Clod Ensemble
- Paola Colletto, teacher, theatre director, pedagogue
- Rodrigo Malbrán, teacher, director and founder of escuela internacional del gesto y la imagen la mancha

== Educational programs ==
- l'École Internationale de Théâtre Jacques Lecoq - Paris

== Publications ==
- Le Theatre du Geste (1987)
- Le Corps Poetique (1999)
