= Peter Bramley (director) =

English actor and theatre director

Peter Bramley (Doncaster, England) is an actor, director and theatre maker. He held the post of Head of Movement at Rose Bruford College, a drama school in Kent, for 12 years. He is the artistic director of theatre company Pants on Fire.

Bramley trained in drama at Doncaster College and Royal Holloway University, before going to train at the L'École Internationale de Théâtre Jacques Lecoq in Paris. During Bramley's second year at the school in 1999 Jacques Lecoq died, making him one of the final ever students to have trained with Lecoq himself. In addition, Bramley has trained with both the Gardzienice company in Poland and Song of the Goat, and has an MA in theatre practices.

As a teacher, Peter Bramley has worked in many leading Uk Drama schools, including Central School of Speech and Drama, LAMDA and LIPA, and has given workshops internationally at Yale University, the Moscow Arts Theatre School in Russia, DAMU Prague, Institut del Teatre Barcelona, Spain, and for the Jerwood Programme at Glydbourne Opera.

In 2010 Bramley's highly acclaimed production of Ovid's Metamorphoses won the Carol Tambor Best of Edinburgh Award and the Whatsonstage.com Editors Prize. In January 2011 the production transferred to the Off-Broadway Flea Theater in New York, and has since toured extensively.

Peter is the artistic director of the Arjac Arts and Cultural Centre, a residential retreat venue for singers, actors, writers and artists in South West France.
