= Palazzo Pisani Moretta =

Palace in Venice, Italy

Coordinates: 45°26′10″N 12°19′46″E

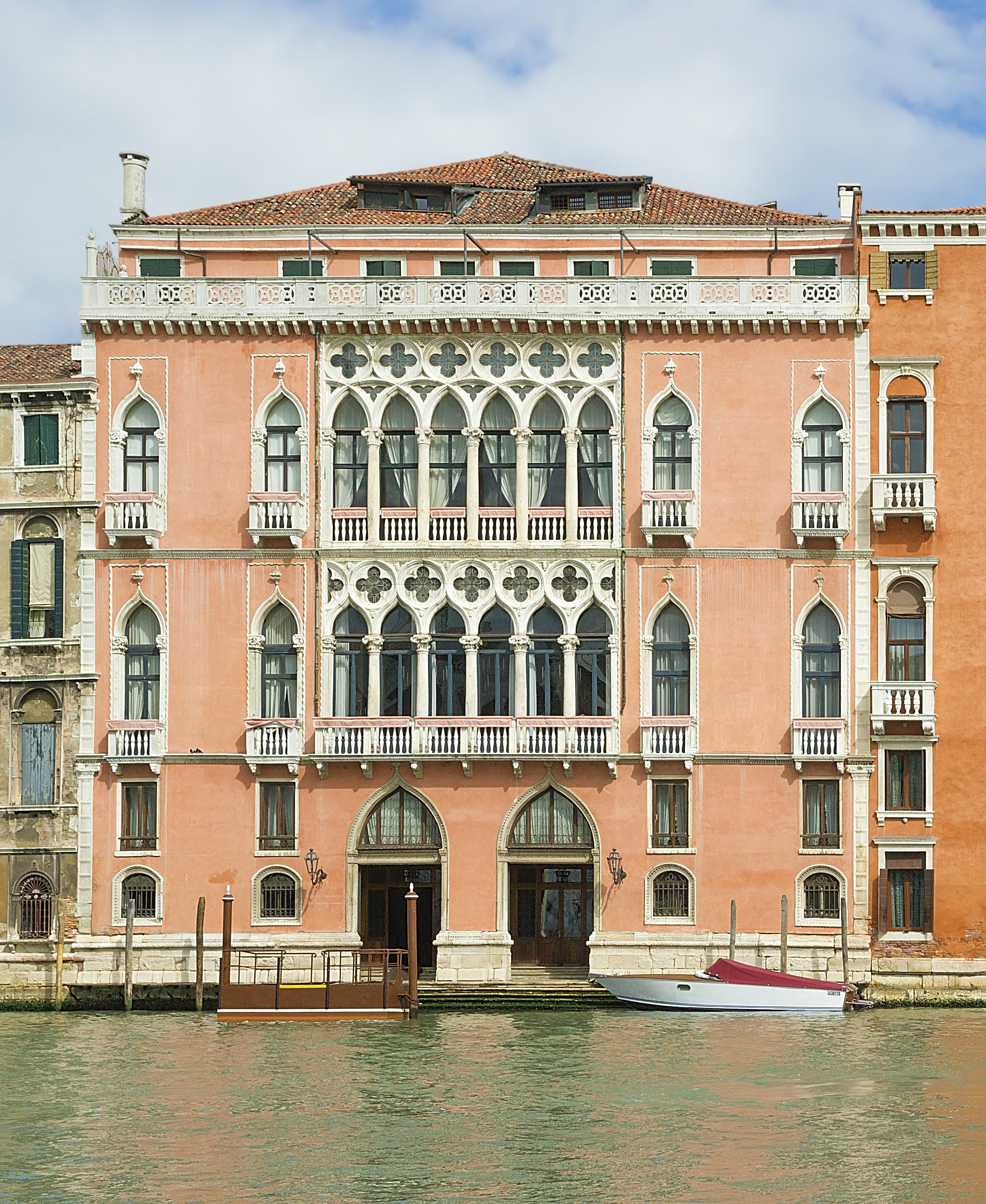
Palazzo Pisani Moretta – Face on Grand Canal

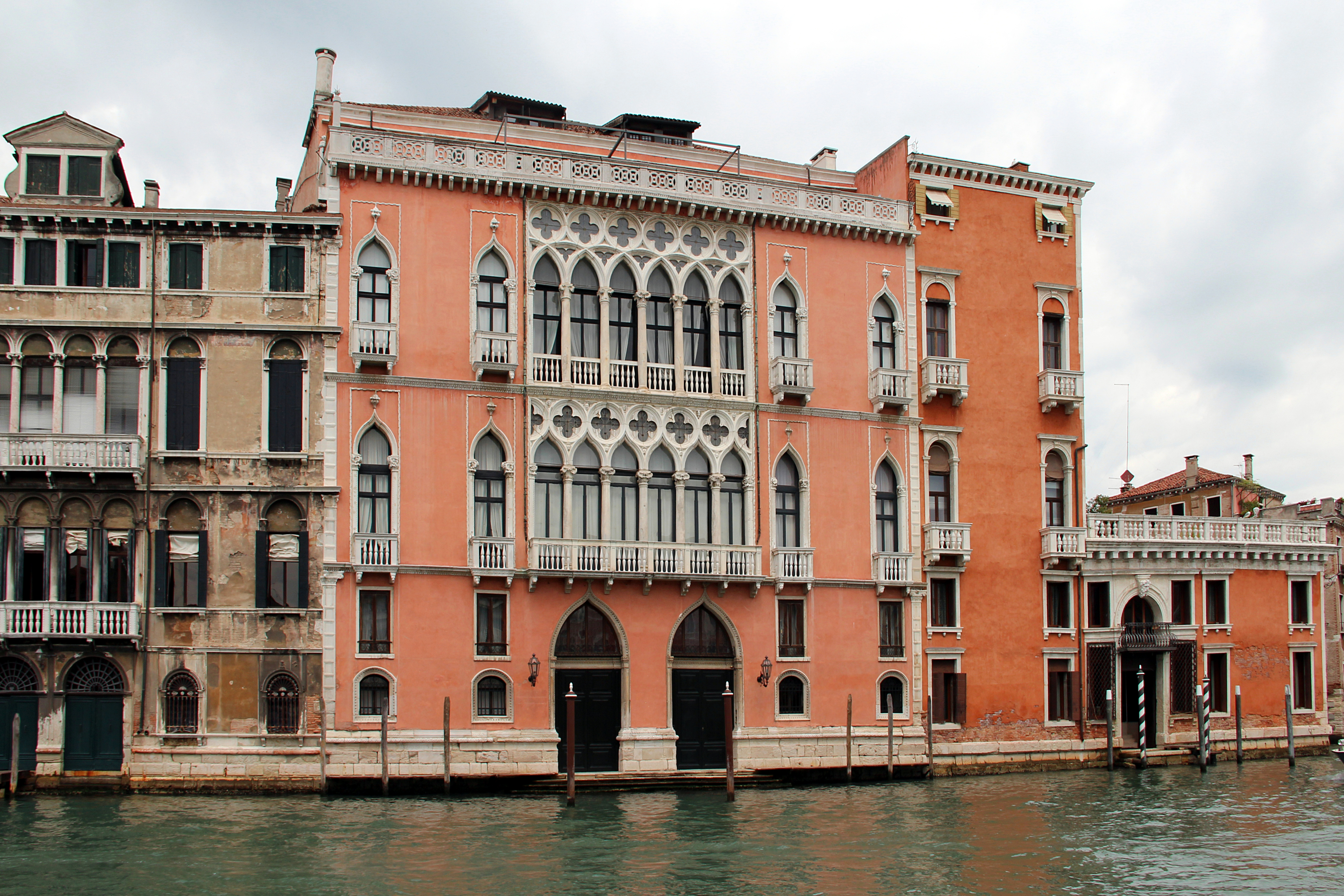
The palazzo Pisani Moretta by the Canal Grande.

Palazzo Pisani Moretta is a palace situated along the Grand Canal in Venice, Italy (in the sestiere of San Polo), between Palazzo Tiepolo and Palazzo Barbarigo della Terrazza.

== History ==
The Bembo family commissioned the construction of the palace in the 15th century. In 1596, the owners of the adjacent Palazzo Barbarigo della Terrazza—located to the north—built a long wing against the palace's northern wall. In 1629, the Bembo palace passed to a branch of the Pisani family. The name "Pisani Moretta" originated from a corruption of the name of the family patriarch, Almorò Pisani. Following the death of Francesco Pisani Moretta—the family's last male heir—in 1737, the property was inherited by his daughter, Chiara. She married a member of the Pisani dal Banco family and commissioned Andrea Tirali to remove the external staircase and construct a salon. She also engaged the most prominent painters of the era to create the interior decorations.

Her son, Vettor, married a commoner named Teresa Dalla Vedova; they had a son together, Pietro, whom Vettor never legitimized. In 1793, Giovanni Filippo Barbarigo (1773–1843)—the sole heir to the neighboring palazzo—married Chiara Maria Pisani Moretta (1773–1840), the heiress of Palazzo Pisani Moretta. The couple likely resided on the second floor; this would explain why Chiara, through her paternal inheritance, acquired a wing on the second floor of Palazzo Pisani Moretta and had it structurally connected to Palazzo Barbarigo della Terrazza via a passageway spanning the Calle Corner. In March 1793, Alvise Barbarigo commissioned the architect Gian Antonio Selva to construct a small oriel window over the Ramo Barbarigo, with its exterior resting against the wall of the Pisani-Moretta palace. In this way, the two structures became increasingly intertwined.

In 1843, the widowed and childless last representative of his family branch named his cousin, Nicolò Antonio Giustinian da San Pantalon, as his heir. Pietro, however, successfully sued to claim both the property and the title of Conte. However, he died as early as 1847. The heiress, a daughter, married Giusti del Giardino. In 1962, the palazzo passed to the Sammartini family, who rented it out for festivities and congresses, particularly during Carnival, when it hosted an annual masquerade ball Il Ballo del Doge.

Although the property had been on the market for some time, a planned sale to a Hong Kong magnate for 43 million euros fell through in 2018. Finally, in May 2025, the Belgian fashion designer Dries Van Noten purchased the building (for alleged 36 million euros) for his newly established cultural foundation, which he runs with his long-time partner Patrick Vangheluwe. As early as April 2026, the Fondazione Dries Van Noten opened its headquarters with an inaugural exhibition, The Only True Protest Is Beauty, showcasing the foundation’s program through an eclectic mix of fashion, art, and craftsmanship. The intention is to create a "home for craftsmanship" that—apart from temporary exhibitions—would house "artist residencies, cultural events, and workshops dedicated to ancient Venetian techniques".

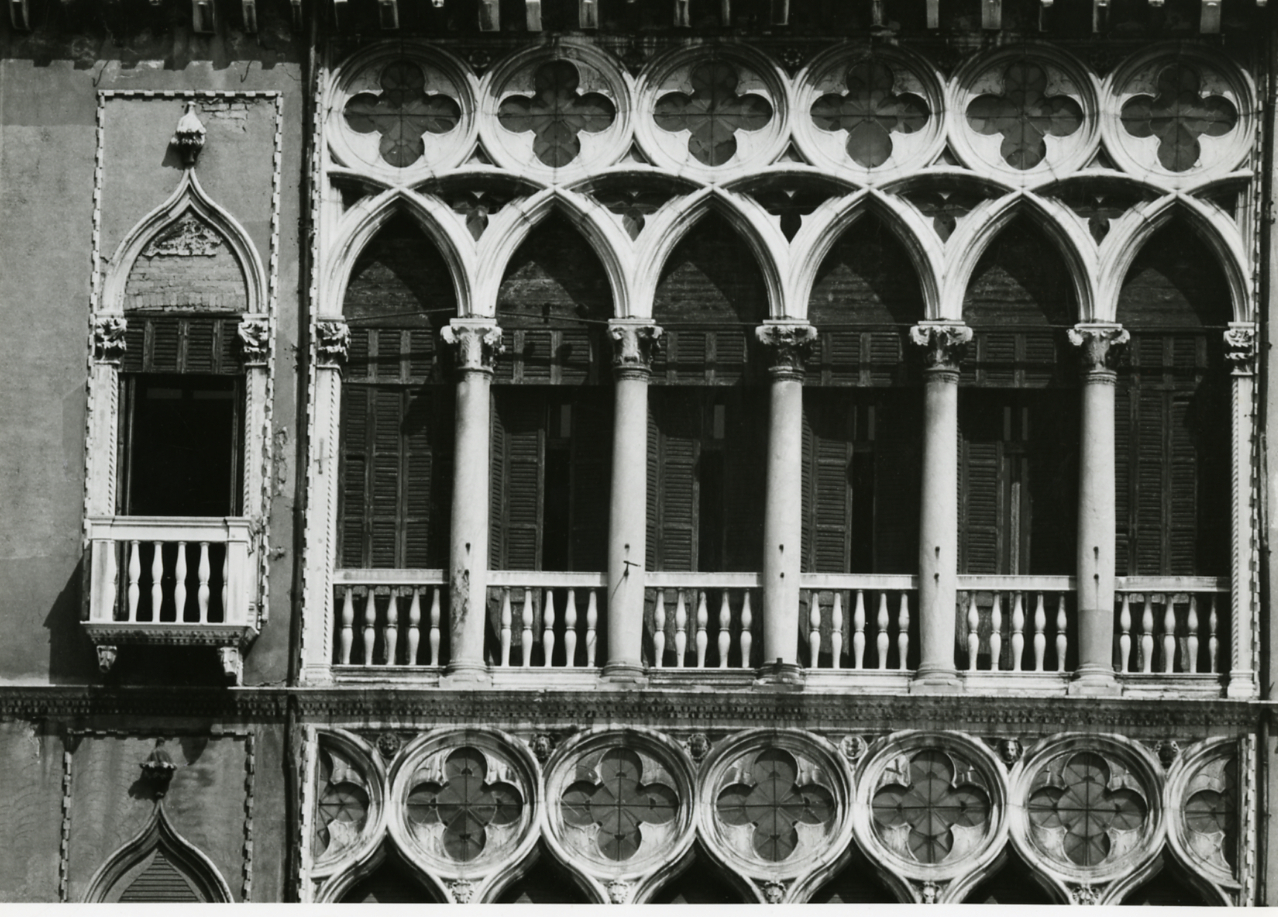
Details. Photo by Paolo Monti, 1969

== Description ==
The palace's façade exemplifies the Venetian Gothic style in a Mannerist form (fiorito). The ground floor (piano terra), featuring both land and water entrances, supports the mezzanine level, above which rise the two piani nobili (main floors). Apart from the Palazzo Cavalli-Franchetti, only the Pisani Moretta palace features a six-light mullioned windows on the second piano nobile where the quatrefoils of the tracery are positioned above pointed arches formed by semicircular arches. The ogival arches flanked by two single windows are similar to those of the Doge's Palace. The ground floor has two central pointed arched doorways opening on to the canal. The land entrance connects the building to the Ramo Pisani e Barbarigo, a narrow alley that also provides pedestrian access to the Palazzo Barbarigo.

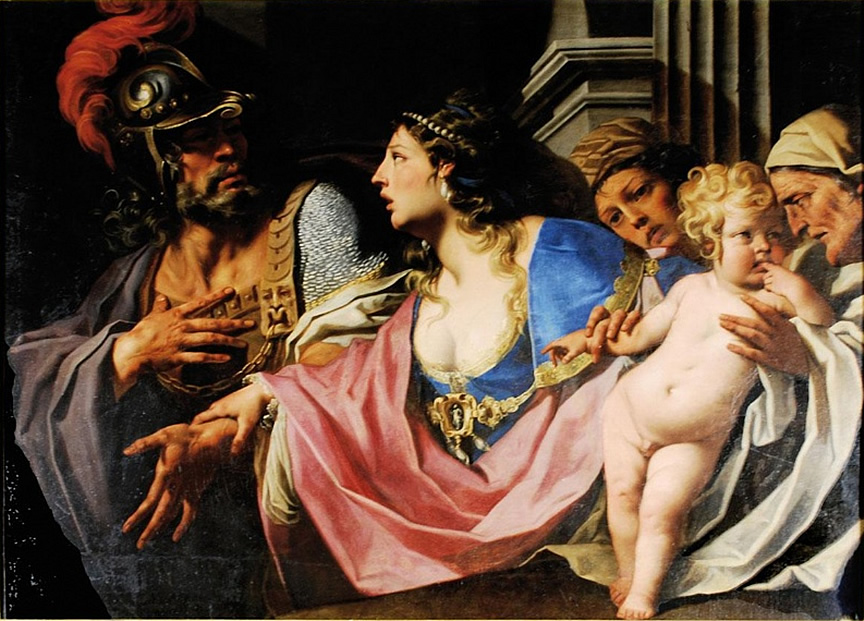
Commiato di Ettore da Andromaca by Luca Ferrari (1605–1654)

=== The interior and its fittings ===
The interiors are designed in Baroque, Rococo and Neoclassical styles, dating predominantly from the 18th century. During renovations around 1770, the Gothic open staircase in the building's rear courtyard—which originally led to the second piano nobile via two intermediate landings—was removed. Furthermore, the palazzo was extended to include a roof terrace and an additional attic story.

The first piano nobile is organized around a 24-meter-long portego (central hall) adorned with frescoes by Jacopo Guarana (1720–1808), including Luce che sconfigge le tenebre ("Light Defeating Darkness") and Apollo con le ore del mattino ("Apollo with the Hours of the Morning"). Two of the adjoining rooms house works by Giambattista Tiepolo (L'incontro tra Venere e Marte ["The Meeting of Venus and Mars"], 1743) and Pietro Longhi. The secondo piano nobile houses the current ballroom. Originally, works by Giuseppe Angeli, Gaspare Diziani, Giambattista Piazzetta, and Costantino Cedini were also located there.

The palace once housed, among other things, Paolo Veronese's monumental painting The Family of Darius before Alexander, which was viewed here by Goethe in 1786 (diary entry from October 8 of that year) and acquired by the National Gallery in London, in 1857, where it now hangs. The palace is said to have housed a ceiling painting called The Chariots of Aurora by Giovanni Antonio Pellegrini (1675–1741), which was restored and installed in the Library of George Vanderbilt's Biltmore House in Asheville, North Carolina, in the United States.
