= Chris Channing =

English performer (born 1962)

Christopher (Chris) Channing (born 14 April 1962) is an English performer, designer and director of theatre, physical-theatre and of theatrically styled dance-based events. He has been based in Britain, France and Italy.

== Early life ==
Channing was born in Preston, Lancashire, England, and grew up on the Moray Firth coast of Scotland.

At age 13 he became a resident student at the Royal Ballet School. His direct contemporaries at the school included Alessandra Ferri and Jonathan Cope, choreographers Michael Clark and Russell Maliphant, actress Caroline O'Connor, director of the Royal Ballet Kevin O'Hare, and academic Deborah Bull. He graduated in 1980, aged 18.

== Biography ==
=== UK ===
In 1980 he joined the Northern Ballet Theatre. Under artistic director, Robert de Warren, and choreographers, André Prokovsky, Geoffrey Cauley, Michael Pink and Christopher Gable, he danced in the corps de ballet and as a soloist until the end of the summer 1984.

After leaving the Northern Ballet Theatre, Channing worked as a freelance commercial dancer in feature films, live events and television with choreographers Arlene Phillips, David Taguri and Gillian Gregory.

He later worked as an actor, choreographer and stage designer at important region theatres including the Liverpool Everyman, York Theatre Royal, The Contact Theatre in Manchester, The Manchester International Festival of Expressionism, and the Dundee Rep Company and in fringe, community and prison based work.

During the academic year 1990/1991 he attended the Blackpool and The Fylde College at Lytham St Annes and completed the General National Vocational Qualification Teacher/Training Qualification: Certificate in Counselling Skills in the Development of Learning.

=== Paris ===
In autumn 1992 Channing moved to Paris to study at L'École Internationale de Théâtre Jacques Lecoq, at École Philippe Gaulier and with Ariane Mnouchkine at Théâtre du Soleil.

He appeared in, and created numbers & shows for the theatre/variety shows at 'Piano dans la Cuisine' and 'Scaramouche'. He worked in close collaboration with Philippe Planquois, the artistic director of cabaret-restaurant 'Chez Madame Arthur' on numbers and production ideas both within the 'Madame Arthur' shows and for outside events.

During his time in Paris he started to work as an independent performer producing his own work.

=== Italy ===
Channing moved to Castelvetro di Modena, Emiia Romagna, Italy in Autumn 1994 and was based there until 2017.

He directs and devises physical-theatre shows and performances in the worlds of theatre, performance, recital, circus, fine arts, corporate events and arts-festivals. He writes theatre scripts and adaptations and translates opera and pop songs. As artistic director or event consultant he has taken performance teams to Africa, Turkey, Saudi Arabia, Dubai, Croatia, France and Austria.

He was the artistic director and curator of six editions of the 'International Biennale of the Absurd', including 'The International Competition for the Arts in Absurdity'.

For ten years he specialised in 'Living Paintings' as performance art and theatre. With the 'Living Paintings' performances he was also a guest on some 50 television programmes.

He is master of ceremonies (and staging collaborator) annually at Il Ballo del Doge (The Doge's Ball) in Venice.

He was master of ceremonies at the 70th birthday party of tenor Luciano Pavarotti.

Channing was defined by critic and curator Alberto Masoni as "...One of the artists who manages best to blend or fuse the artistic experiences of theatre, mime, music and visual arts".

== Schools and training ==
=== Theatre: UK & France ===
- Royal Ballet School, London, 1975 - 1980. Age 13 - 18
- L'École Internationale de Théâtre Jacques Lecoq, Paris, 1992- 1993. Age 30 - 31
- École Philippe Gaulier, London, 1993 - 1994. Age 31 -32
- Théâtre du Soleil with Ariane Mnouchkine, closed workshop. August-November 1994.

=== Non theatre ===
Blackpool and The Fylde College, 1990/1991. GNVQ Teacher/Training Qualification:
"Certificate in Counselling Skills in the Development of Learning", covering among other practices:

- Carl Rogers: Person Centred Therapy
- Fritz Perls: Gestalt Therapy
- Albert Ellis: Rational Emotive Therapy
- Eric Berne: Transactional Analysis
- George Kelly: Personal Constructs

== UK theatre performer ==
- Northern Ballet Theatre
  - Paradise Lost. Choreographer Geoffrey Cauley. Role: Serpent / Nuba Tribesman.
  - A Midsummer Night's Dream. Choreographers Robert de Warren and Geoffrey Cauley. Role: Francis Flute / Thisbe.
- Italian Tour with a British cast (Clive Carter, Anita Dobson, David Cardy, Martin Duncan). Dir Hugh Wooldridge
  - The Rocky Horror Show. 1984. Understudy Frank'n'furter, Riff Raff & Brad Majors
- UK tour
  - The Rocky Horror Show. 1984-5. Role: Riff Raff.
- London fringe
  - Leonardo the Musical. 1984. Role: Niccolò Machiavelli.
- York Theatre Royal
  - James and the Giant Peach by Roald Dahl. Musical by Herbert Chappell. Directors Andrew McKinnon and Tim Supple. Musical director Charles Miller. 1985. Role: The Centipede.
  - Stags and Hens by Willy Russell. Director Ian Forrest.
- Dundee Repertory Theatre. August 1985 to March 1987.
  - Annie. Director Robert Robertson. Role: Rooster
  - Sailor Beware. Director Alan Lyddiard. Role: Daphne Pink. This all-male production was set on a British Army base during the Suez Crisis of 1956.
  - Moby Dick—Rehearsed. A two-act drama by Orson Welles. Director Alan Lyddiard. Role: Quee Queg.
  - Treasure Island. Director Robert Robertson. Role: Blind Pew.
  - The Threepenny Opera. Director/Designer Neil Murray.
  - The Snow Queen. Director/Designer Neil Murray. Adapted by Stuart Paterson. Role: title role.

== UK theatre design ==
Designer of set, costume and lighting.

- Cracked Actors Company. 'Rule 43' by Kevin Fegan. Two British theatre tours and a tour of 25 prisons. 1989.
- Liverpool Everyman Theatre at the Unity. Hard Times by Charles Dickens. Director Noreen Kershaw. 1991
- Liverpool Everyman. Example, a play about the crime and hanging of the teenager Derek Bentley. 1991<
- Manchester Green Room/Lancaster Literary Festival. Dorothy Parker. Tiptoe through the Tombstones by Richard Gallagher. 1991
- Manchester Green Room. Not About Heroes by Stephen MacDonald. A play about World War I poets Siegfried Sassoon and Wilfred Owen at Craiglockhart Hospital.

== UK other arts work ==
Liverpool 2008 DaDaFest in Liverpool City of Culture. Channing conceived and directed Horizontal Heroines: Sleep, Death and Madness in Opera, Poetry and Popular Music. Themed recital. Soprano/performer Denise Leigh. Accordion/piano Stefano Andrusyschyn.

Manchester 1992 He was a venue designer for the 'Manchester International Festival of Expressionism'.

== Work in France ==
He devised a theatrical combination of dance and enigmatic mime for small restaurant cabaret-theatres such as, 'Piano dans La Cuisine ', 'Scaramouche ' and 'Chez Madame Arthur', the historic dinner-show painted by Toulouse-Lautrec and frequented by Jane Avril, which was under the artistic direction of Philippe Planquois. He staged Planquois' fashion collection catwalks at various events and together they worked on concepts and numbers for Planquois' himself who in turn made new numbers for Channing’s own cabaret acts. The late Philippe Planquois was the basis for Charles Aznavour's song "What Makes a Man/Comme ils disent".

A street performance as the Mona Lisa, performed by the steps of the Musée d'Orsay was the inspiration for a series of 10 different Living Paintings he created for festivals, galleries and private entertainments after moving to Italy. It also financed his flat near the Marais and gave him the stability he needed to move to Italy.

== Italy performances ==
- Living paintings performances
  - Leonardo da Vinci - Mona Lisa
  - Vincent van Gogh - A self-portrait, the performance compiles various elements of V. Gogh's self-portraits from 1887/8 and uses 'The Starry Night' 1889 as a background.
  - Vincent van Gogh - Portrait of the postman of Arles, Monsieur Roulin
  - Pablo Picasso - Au Lapin Agile (At the Lapin Agile)
  - Leonardo da Vinci - Lady with an Ermine
  - René Magritte - The Son of Man
  - Georges Braque - Portrait of a Man, in the cubist style explored and developed by Braque and Picasso during the 1910s
  - Henri Matisse - Green Stripe (Portrait of Madame Matisse)
  - Caravaggio (Michelangelo Merisi) - Young Sick Bacchus
  - Henri de Toulouse-Lautrec - The Englishman at the Moulin Rouge, a portrait of William T. Warrener, the English painter

The Matisse, Caravaggio and Toulouse Lautrec performances were all created as commissions for RAI television.

The Leonardo 'Lady with Ermine' was commissioned by actress Ottavia Piccolo as a parlour performance on her birthday.

These performances were seen, in their pure form or adapted for clients or atmosphere, at private parlour events, at corporate events (BMW, Selfridges, Samsonite, Rolex, Agent Provocateur) in seminar/educational settings and gala evenings, in galleries and museums and as television guests:
Leonardo da Vinci Museum of Science, Milan, The Uffizi Galleries, Florence, United Nations Climate Summit, Milan, Museum of Fine Arts, Budapest, The Verona Arena (Private party for Zeffirelli), Castle Ambrass, Innsbruck (Portrait exhibition opening), Dress Circle book-shop, London (Book press-launch), Louvre Museum, Paris (Art prize prize-giving). And at arts festivals in Croatia, Switzerland, Austria, Brazil, Sicily.

=== Performances. character pieces ===
  - Faun - a self-contained performance based on the 'exhibition 'and explanation of a rare beast.
  - The Guardian Angel - a figure 3 m (9.8 ft) high with a 3.5 m (11 ft) wingspan, made from white cotton rags.
  - Medieval Beggar - a performance of physical and vocal comedy based on the dancing grotesques in the paintings of Bosch and Bruegel.

=== Installations, one-off performances and commissions ===
- No Flying Tonight - performance commissioned by Breza Festival, Osijek, Croatia. Installation. The performer is placed within a tightly woven white elastic net 10 m^{2} (110 sq ft). Each corner is anchored to a taut elastic rope tied-off above the level of the performer's head. Inside the net the performer is naked but for a small and ragged pair of fairy wings tied to his shoulders with broad dirty elastics; his eyes and armpits are smudged in red. The danced captivity alternates between submission and fight, resulting in the elastic ropes and the net become tighter, higher, more confining and more sculptural.
- If I Want to Drown That's My Business - installation. A man underwater held upright by a giant jellyfish. The performer's upper body, wearing just an Elizabethan neck-ruff, emerges from the centre of collaged seascape suspended from elastic rope. The performance is marked by the continuous tears of the drowned man.
- Untitled (Silence of the Lambs) - a performance based on the Jame 'Buffalo Bill' Gumb character in the novel Silence of the Lambs who is making himself a "lady-suit". Hanging above the performer is a washing line on which are pegged pieces of skin from various body parts, all made of latex (breasts, buttocks, genitalia or both sexes, stomach, scalp, face and generalised squares of skin). There is a full-length mirror and hundreds of pieces of white sticking plaster. The performance consists of trying out the body parts in various combinations and not strictly in anatomically correct positioning. Between trials the parts are all removed but the sticking plaster always remains.
- Observation Tank - a commission from Diego della Palma for the international cosmetics trade fair, CosmoProf, Bologna. Three naked performers in a glass enclosure, 6 by 10 m (20 by 33 ft), with tree trunks stripped of their bark to reveal, in the wood the tracks of parasitical insects.
- Aphonic - an interactive performance made for the opening of a photographic exhibition of work by Sergio Smerieri in Milan and repeated for 'Poesia Festival', Emilia-Romagna 2010. Channing stands on a slowly revolving plinth and is naked but for a pair of 1950s Y-front underwear. The guests at the gallery use coloured marker pens to draw and write on the head, body and underwear of the performer.
- Benozzo Gozzoli - performance commissioned by the Benozzo Gozzoli Museum, Castelfiorentino, Province of Florence. A living sinopia placed in a Gozzoli Tabernacle and reliving the emotions of his life story over the course of a day.

== Italian theatre ==
=== As performer / director / designer ===
- The Little Withinsight House (original title: Tectus ad Spectrum) - contemporary theatre. A four-sided structure. An installation. A 'hut' containing a live performance in interaction with a hand-made film. Miniatures are projected as human size. There are flames, puppets, drawings, tears (rips), etc. and Channing himself appears filmed in miniature or in gigantic proportions in interaction with his live self. The performance is viewed through holes in three of the hut's walls. Each viewing hole is in the centre of a small autobiographical or historical element (a photograph, a letter, an object or a toy) specific to the performer. The film and its accompanying live interaction trace autobiographical themes.
- Mona Lisa in Delirium Totus - theatre show. The creation, life, death and triumphal return of a cultural monster. Freely inspired by the myth of Orpheus and Mary Shelley's Frankenstein. An ironic discourse on the lack of, and search for, an identity in the space made by an excess of the same. The piece traces the story of high and popular art.
- Italy for Beginners - a theatre show made in collaboration with Francesco Bifano of Slava's Snow Show. A clown duo - one intellectual and one stupid – an historian and his assistant explaining Italy, its history and its connections with the new world. The show uses puppets, quick change, masks, music, and interrupted exposition. Episodes include: Christopher Columbus and the Queen of Spain, Ellis Island and immigration, ’O sole mio and Dean Martin, country music and tarantella, the Statue of Liberty and Julius Caesar, the Mona Lisa and Michelangelo's David.
- Something like a Life - theatre show. A life danced in 15 minutes. The performer emerges from a suspended cotton sack wearing leather shoes, a business suit, a shirt and a tie. The clothes are completely cutaway all around the body between the chest and hips revealing a pink surgical corset.

=== As director / choreographer / designer ===
- MeRememberMe / MiRicordandoMi - created for the physical performer Patrizia Marcato. A show in which the fictional former Paris variety star, Victoria MaBel, comes upon her old acrobatic-dance apparatus (a 2 m (6 ft 7 in) fixed hoop) under a dust sheet and relives several of her successful numbers.
- Spettri dell'animo (Shadows in the Soul) - from the novel A Christmas Carol by Charles Dickens. Adapted, designed and directed by Chris Channing for a company of ten actors. Staged in the disused Church of St Frances in San Giovanni in Persiceto, Bologna. From Christmas Eve to the 31 December at midnight every night. The show is a promenade production following Ebenezer Scrooge (and his bed) around the empty building.
- Healing Hearts - the Balcony Scene from Shakespeare's Romeo and Juliet with additional texts by Dante Alighieri, Cecco Angiolieri and other 13th century vulgarians. Set in a psychiatric hospital. Romeo is ill. Juliet is his therapist. She and a chorus of ghosts from his past, represented as pregnant and baby cradling nurses, take him through his first day of treatment.
- Babar the Little Elephant by Francis Poulenc. For the Arena del Sole, Bologna. Narrator - Alessandro Bergonzoni. Chris Channing - stage director and lighting design (Orchestral players all individually lit). Aikoros Orchestra / Maestro Fabio Marco Brunelli.
- Memories and Obsessions - a dance-theatre piece using ten performers: five dancers and five actresses. Direction, choreography and design by Chris Channing. Original music score by Andrea Montalbano. The piece uses dance, mime and vocal and physical acting as well as recorded speech and soundscapes to create a collage of images and atmospheres. It is based on archive records and photographs of the hysterics, "mad women" and women committed for "social reasons" to mental asylums and similar institutions during the 18th and 19th centuries. Performed originally in a sunken pit of a stage surrounded on all sides by the audience.
- One Long Scandal (The Music of Revolution). The Story of Rock 'n' Roll. A theatre show performed by 30 young adults between the ages of 16 and 30. Devised and written on a commission from ten collaborating town councils. The story of rock 'n' roll… Really the story of the development of popular music from the point of view of the scandal created by each music style and associated dance craze: from the waltz through to psychedelic rock, via the can-can/ ragtime/ jazz/ blues/ country and western/ rock 'n' roll/ progressive rock. Characters include a master of ceremonies/narrator, 'rock' himself, a poet, the guardian of moral values. A six piece band, vocal soloists, backing singers and a dancing / mime chorus.

== Collaborations ==
- Matteo Bianchi - contemporary Italian poet. Chris Channing has translated two volumes of his work.
- Giardino Barocco (Baroque Garden) - Chris Channing is artistic director and creator of the concept behind Henry White's white-effect, period costume, performance project.
- Moonlight Invasion (Invasioni Lunari) by Francesca Krnjak. Chris Channing collaborated on the realisation of this project creating choreography, the make-up design and costume designs
- The Doge's Ball, properly called, 'Il Ballo del Doge'. Proprietor and creator: Antonia Sautter. Chris Channing is Master of Ceremonies, and sometime staging collaborator, at this annual Venice event and at other regular Venetian events under the same banner.
