= Du rififi chez les femmes =

- Directed by: Alex Joffé
- Written by: Alex Joffé; José Giovanni; Gabriel Arout; James-Jacques Mage; Auguste Le Breton
- Produced by: James-Jacques Mage
- Starring: Nadja Tiller; Robert Hossein; Silvia Monfort; Roger Hanin
- Cinematography: Pierre Montazel
- Edited by: Léonide Azar
- Music by: Louiguy
- Distributed by: Cinédis
- Release date: 20 May 1959 (France)
- Running time: 110 minutes
- Countries: France; Italy
- Language: French

Du rififi chez les femmes ("The Riff Raff Girls") is a French-Italian film directed by Alex Joffé and released in 1959.

== Plot ==
In Brussels, rival criminal gangs confront each other. One is led by Vicky, proprietor of a nightclub on a barge; the other by Bug, who wants to reign over the lucrative nightlife business. Vicky and her gang, who are planning a bank raid, are going to see their plans confounded by Bug. In effect, he is being manipulated by a police officer who forces him to help break up a drug trafficking deal in return for keeping his residence in Belgium. Bug and Yoko will strongly compromise the bank raid, believing that it is linked to the drugs.

== Book ==
The film is based on the Auguste Le Breton novel, Du rififi chez les femmes, published in 1957 and reprinted in 2010.

== Production ==
- Director: Alex Joffé
- Screenplay: Alex Joffé, José Giovanni, Gabriel Arout, James-Jacques Mage and Auguste Le Breton from his novel Du rififi chez les femmes (1957, Presses de la Cité)
- Dialogue: Auguste Le Breton
- Music: Louiguy
- Song: Rififi, words by Charles Aznavour and music by Louiguy, sung by Nadja Tiller
- Director of photography: Pierre Montazel
- Camera Operator: Alain Douarinou
- Sound: Joseph de Bretagne
- Editing: Léonide Azar
- Set Design: Rino Mondellini
- Costumes: Pierre Balmain
- Stills photographer: Walter Limot
- Country: France, Italy
- Filming:
  - Language: French
  - Interiors: Studios de Boulogne-Billancourt (Hauts-de-Seine)
  - Exteriors: Brussels
- Producer: James-Jacques Mage
- Director of production: Jacques Plante
- Production companies: Les Productions de l'Étoile, Dismage, Transalpina, Technostampa
- Distribution company: Cinedis
- Aspect ratio: black and white — 35 mm — 1:37.1 — monaural
- Genre: Crime film
- Length: 110 min
- Release date: 20 May 1959

== Cast ==
- Nadja Tiller : Vicky
- Robert Hossein : Marcel Point-Bleu
- Silvia Monfort : Yoko
- Roger Hanin : Bug
- Pierre Blanchar : "Le Pirate"
- Françoise Rosay : Berthe
- Jean Gaven : James
- Eddie Constantine : Williams
- Georges Rigaud : "Le Marquis"
- Daniel Emilfork : Luigi
- Wayne Van Voorhes : Chicago, the Sicilian
- André Cellier : the transporter
- Denise Clair : Prune
- Michel Galabru
- Lucien Raimbourg
- Maurice Garrel
- Carlo Campanini
- Tiberio Murgia
- René Alone
- Isaac Alvarez
- Léopoldo Francès
- Liliane de Kermadec
- Claude Piéplu
- Anne-Marie Coffinet
- André Berthomieu
- Yves Barsacq
- Don Ziegler
