= Belphégor (novel) =

1927 novel by Arthur Bernède

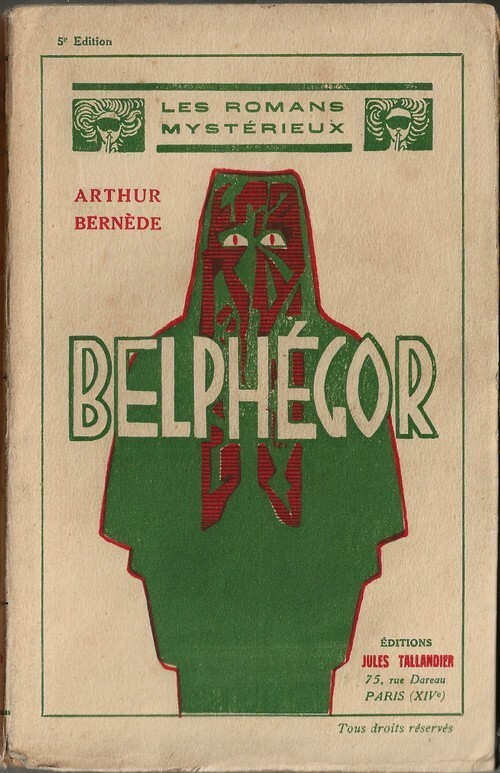
- French cover.
- Author: Arthur Bernède
- Language: French
- Publication date: 1927
- Publication place: France

Belphégor (English title The Mystery of the Louvre) is a 1927 crime novel by French writer Arthur Bernède, about a "phantom" which haunts the Louvre Museum, in reality a masked villain trying to steal a hidden treasure.

It was simultaneously adapted for the silent screen by Bernède as a 220-minute movie serial, directed by Henri Desfontaines and starring René Navarre as Chantecoq, Bernède's fictional detective who captures the phantom with the aid of his daughter Collette, and Elmire Vautier as the villainous Belphégor. The film also featured Lucien Dalsace, Michèle Verly (as Colette) and Genica Messirio. Critic Troy Howarth writes that the plot of both the novel and the film was inspired by earlier French serials such as Fantomas (1913), Les Vampires (1915) and Fritz Lang's Dr. Mabuse, the Gambler (1922).

== Adaptations ==
Belphégor inspired several other adaptations, including an eponymous 1965 French television series starring Juliette Gréco in a leading role (but without Chantecoq) and a 1965 daily comic strip sequel to the TV series drawn by Julio Ribéra which appeared in France-Soir,

Additionally, it was adapted into a children's animated television series that aired in 2000 on France 2's DKTV.cool block in France. It was also adapted into a 2001 film starring Sophie Marceau which was the first adaptation to actually be filmed inside the Louvre, and a 2001 French-Canadian animated television series which consisted of 26 episodes. In 2025, another television series will premiere on HBO Max in December 2025.

The 1967 film La Malédiction de Belphégor has nothing to do with Bernède's version and was only made to cash in on the 1965 French television series' popularity.

== Editions ==
- 1927, J. Tallandier
- 1929, World Wide Publishing Co., Inc. (English)
- 2001, Fayard, ISBN 2-213-60909-8
- 2001, Hachette, ISBN 2-01-321875-3
- 2012, Black Coat Press, (adapted into English by Jean-Marc Lofficier & Randy Lofficier ISBN 978-1-61227-110-1)
- 2019, Independently Published (translated into English by Chris Amies ISBN 979-8668736225)
