= Isaac Alvarez =

French actor and mime (1930–2020)

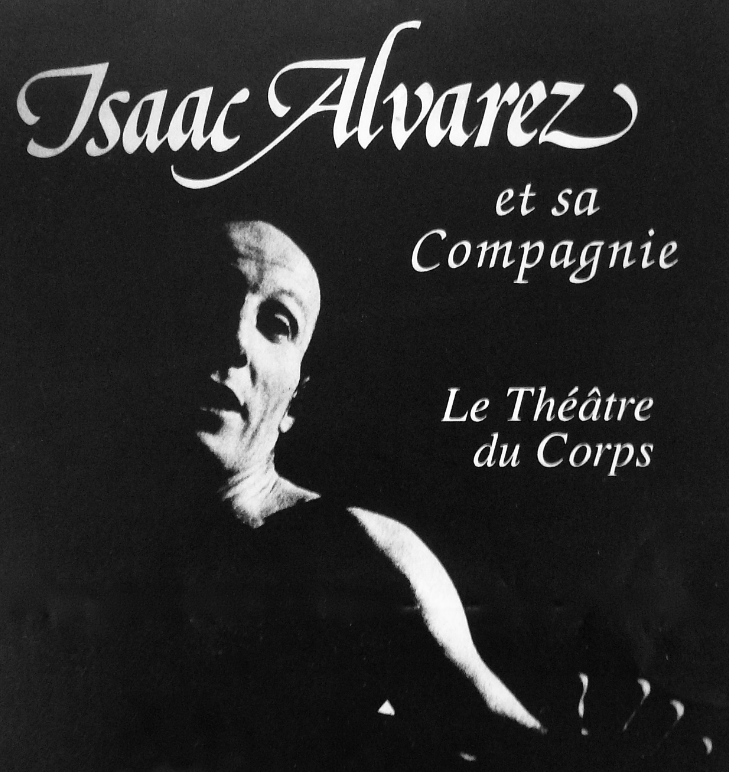
- Alvarez at the Théâtre du Moulinage
- Born: 26 July 1930; Alexandria, Kingdom of Egypt
- Died: 3 November 2020 (aged 90); Aubenas, France
- Occupations: Actor; Mime

Isaac Alvarez (26 July 1930 – 3 November 2020) was a French actor, mime, and choreographer. He founded the École du théâtre du mouvement in Paris in 1956 alongside Jacques Lecoq. In 1981, he founded the Théâtre du Moulinage in Lussas.

== Biography ==
During World War II, Alvarez was subjected to Nazi Germany's concentration camps. Upon his release, he would enter the world of theatre, following after Charles Dullin. He met Jacques Lecoq in the 1950s, and they founded the École du théâtre du mouvement in 1956, which would become the École internationale de théâtre Jacques Lecoq.

Alvarez acted in theatrical productions, films, and television series. He collaborated with Jean-Luis Barrault for The Siege of Numantia, which was performed in 1965 at the Chorégies d'Orange.

Alvarez traveled across France to teach with the Comédiens-mimes de Paris. He would teach a young Philippe Decouflé in his acting workshops. In 1981, he founded the Théâtre du Moulinage, which doubled as a theatre and an acting school. After the theatre closed its doors in 2008, Alvarez worked with the Teatro Instabile in Aosta, Italy.

Isaac Alvarez died in Aubenas on 3 November 2020 at the age of 90.

== Creations ==
- Vie à Pablo Neruda (1978)
- Mémoire en blanc
- Le Rire et l'Oubli
- Sacerdoce pour un caoutchouc
- Les Chevaliers du naufrage
- Au candélabre des pas perdus
- Passeport pour l'éphémère (1989)
- À bâtons rompus (1990)

== Theatre ==
- Le Gisant (1958)
- Compagnie Jacques Lecoq (1959)
- Les Bâtisseurs d'empire (1959)
- Hamlet (1960)
- Le Monstre Turquin (1964)
- Les Bâtisseurs d'empire (1966)

== Directed Plays ==
- The Siege of Numantia (1965)
- Protée (1969)

== Filmography ==
- La Belle Équipe (1958)
- Julie la Rousse (1959)
- Du rififi chez les femmes (1959)
- Cyrano de Bergerac (1960)
- Etudes aux Allures et Les Trois Soldats (1961)
- Le Perroquet du fils Hoquet (1963)
- Belphegor, or Phantom of the Louvre (1965)
- Les Compagnons de Baal (1968)
