= Belphegor, or Phantom of the Louvre =

TV mini-series

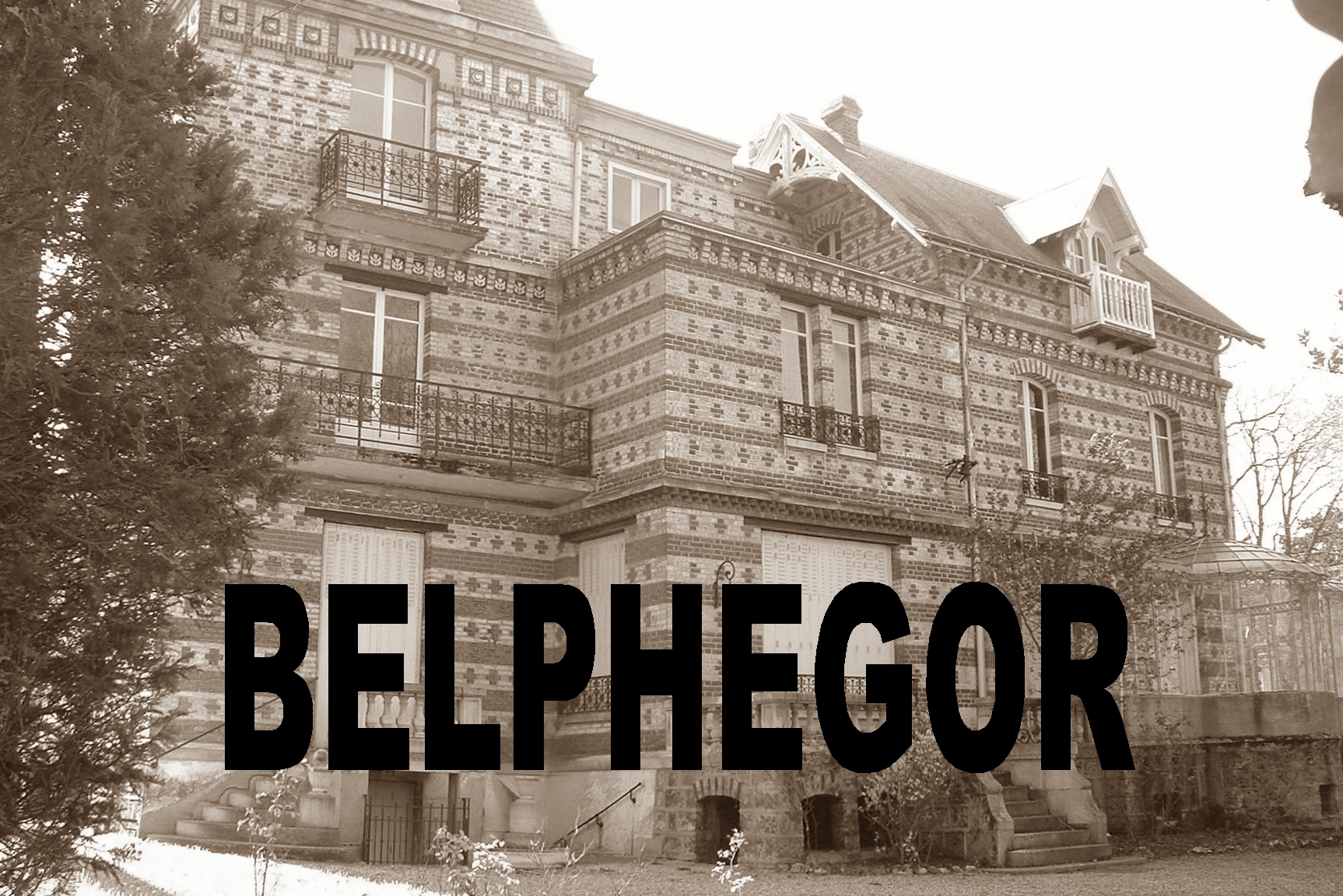
- Also known as: Le Fantôme du Louvre (Quebec)
- French: Belphégor ou le Fantôme du Louvre
- Genre: Thriller
- Based on: Belphégor by Arthur Bernède
- Screenplay by: Claude Barma; Jacques Armand
- Story by: Jacques Armand (dialogue)
- Directed by: Claude Barma
- Presented by: Jean Topart
- Starring: Juliette Gréco; Isaac Alvarez; Yves Rénier; Christine Delaroche; René Dary; François Chaumette; Sylvie; Paul Crauchet; Marguerite Muni
- Composer: Antoine Duhamel
- Country of origin: France
- Original language: French
- No. of seasons: 1
- No. of episodes: 4

Production
- Executive producer: Robert Paillardon
- Production location: Europe
- Cinematography: Jacques Lemare
- Editor: Marcelle Lioret
- Camera setup: Single-camera
- Running time: 290 minutes
- Production company: Société Nouvelle Pathé Cinéma

Original release
- Network: ORTF
- Release: March 6 – March 27, 1965

Related
- Belphégor (1927); The Curse of Belphegor (1967); Belphegor, Phantom of the Louvre (2001)

Belphegor, or the Phantom of the Louvre is a 1965 French television miniseries directed by Claude Barma, based on the 1927 novel by Arthur Bernède. It consists of four 70-minute episodes.

== Plot ==
A mysterious phantom appears in the Musée du Louvre in Paris at night. The guards are unable to catch it. A student, André Bellegarde obstinately tries to find out more about the strange creature by himself. He seems to be more effective in doing so than the local police led by commissaire Menardier. Bellegarde does cooperate with the police, too, but he mostly goes his own way investigating Belphégor's activity. A secret society is in the background. Bellegarde, in the meantime, is involved in two romances and cannot decide which woman to dedicate himself as the case gets more and more serious and criminal and threads meet.

== Cast ==
- Juliette Gréco as Laurence / Stéphanie Hiquet
- Isaac Alvarez as Belphégor
- Yves Rénier as André Bellegarde
- Christine Delaroche as Colette Ménardier
- René Dary as Commissaire Ménardier
- François Chaumette as Boris Williams
- Sylvie as Lady Hodwin
- Paul Crauchet as Le gardien Gautrais
- Marguerite Muni as Louise Gautrais
- René Alone as Doublet
- Yves Bureau as Ménard
- Jacky Calatayud as L'enfant

== Legacy ==
Danish filmmaker Lars von Trier has credited Belphegor and David Lynch's television series Twin Peaks as inspirations for his miniseries The Kingdom.
