= Avner the Eccentric =

American performer and magician

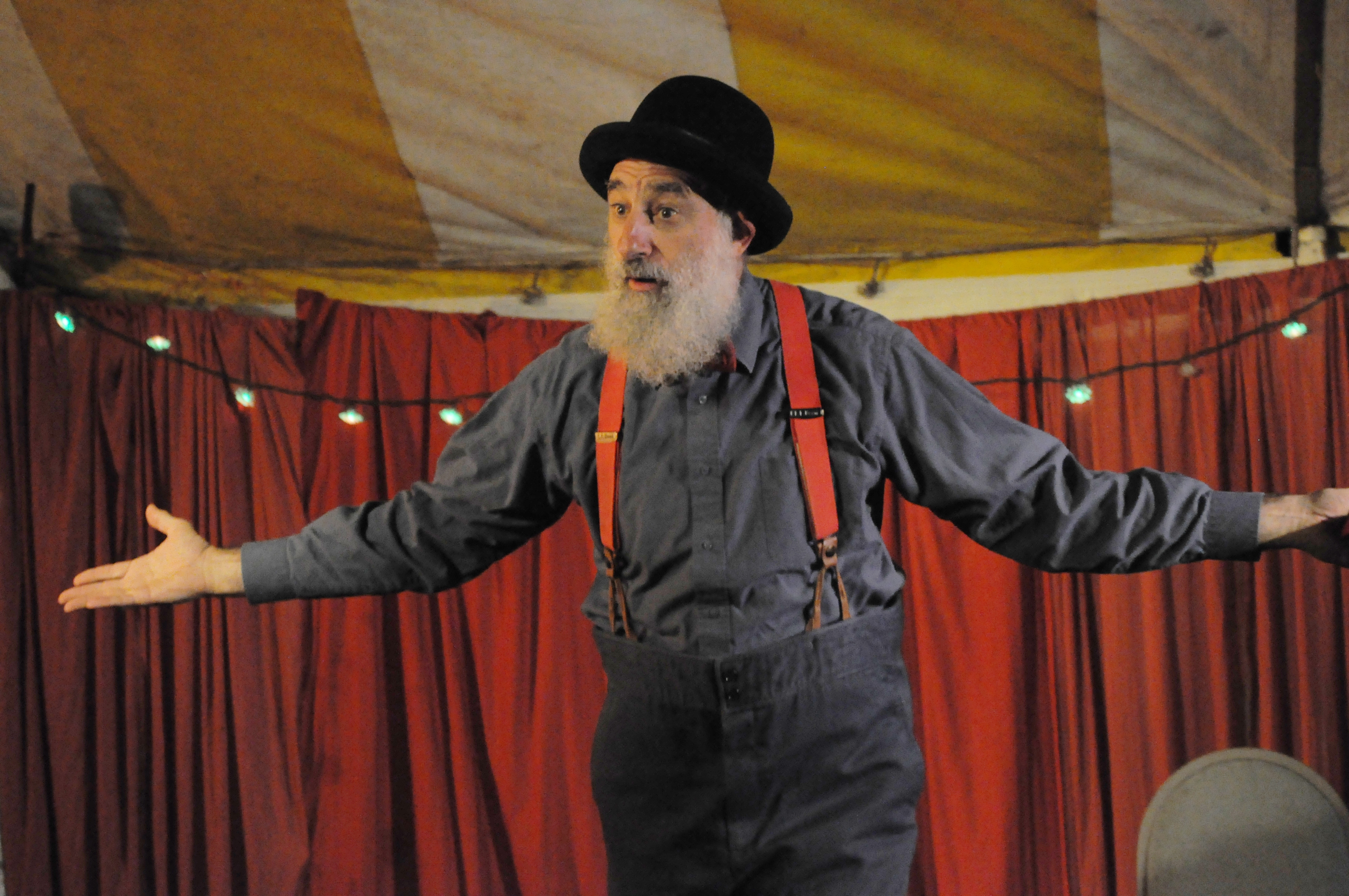
- Avner in 2012
- Born: Avner Eisenberg; 26 August 1948 (age 77); Atlanta, Georgia, United States
- Occupations: Clown, performance artist, mime, juggler and sleight of hand
- Website: avnertheeccentric.com

Avner Eisenberg, also known by his stage name "Avner the Eccentric" (born August 26, 1948) is an American vaudeville performer, clown, mime, juggler, and sleight of hand magician. John Simon described him in 1984 as "A clown for the thinking man and the most exacting child."

Born in Atlanta, Georgia, Avner went to four different universities with a variety of tentative majors; he ultimately received a theater degree from the University of Washington in 1971. He then studied mime in Paris under Jacques Lecoq, interrupting those studies to spend some time as a puppeteer. Returning to the U.S., he taught at Carlo Clementi's Dell'Arte International School of Physical Theatre in California.

He performed at Renaissance fairs and on stages, before playing the title role in the 1985 film The Jewel of the Nile, a film that also featured his fellow vaudevillians The Flying Karamazov Brothers. In a review of that film, Janet Maslin singled out Avner for praise: "Avner Eisenberg very nearly steals the film…" Roger Ebert, on reviewing the film, also singled Eisenberg out as "a true comic discovery".

Other notable roles have included a self-titled 1984 Broadway show, an appearance in a 1987 Lincoln Center production of Shakespeare's The Comedy of Errors, and the principal role Srulik the ventriloquist in the 1989 Broadway play Ghetto. He has also played both Vladimir and Estragon in productions of Samuel Beckett's Waiting for Godot, costarred with his wife, Julie Goell, in the world premiere of Zoo of Tranquility, and portrayed Robert Crumb in Comix.

He has performed his wordless solo act at numerous festivals, including the Edinburgh Festival, Israel Festival, Festival of American Mime, and the International Festival du Cirque in Monte Carlo. In 2004 he sold out the Theatre Fontaine in Paris for three months.

In addition to his performing, he is certified as an Ericksonian Hypnotist and NLP Master Practitioner, and has taught workshops on silent theater skills as a therapeutic tool for students and professionals in health care, education and counseling, as well as teaching theater workshops. He also sits on the board of directors of the Etz Chaim Synagogue (Portland, Maine). As of 2009, he lives on an island in Maine.
