= Juliette Gréco =

French singer and actress (1927–2020)

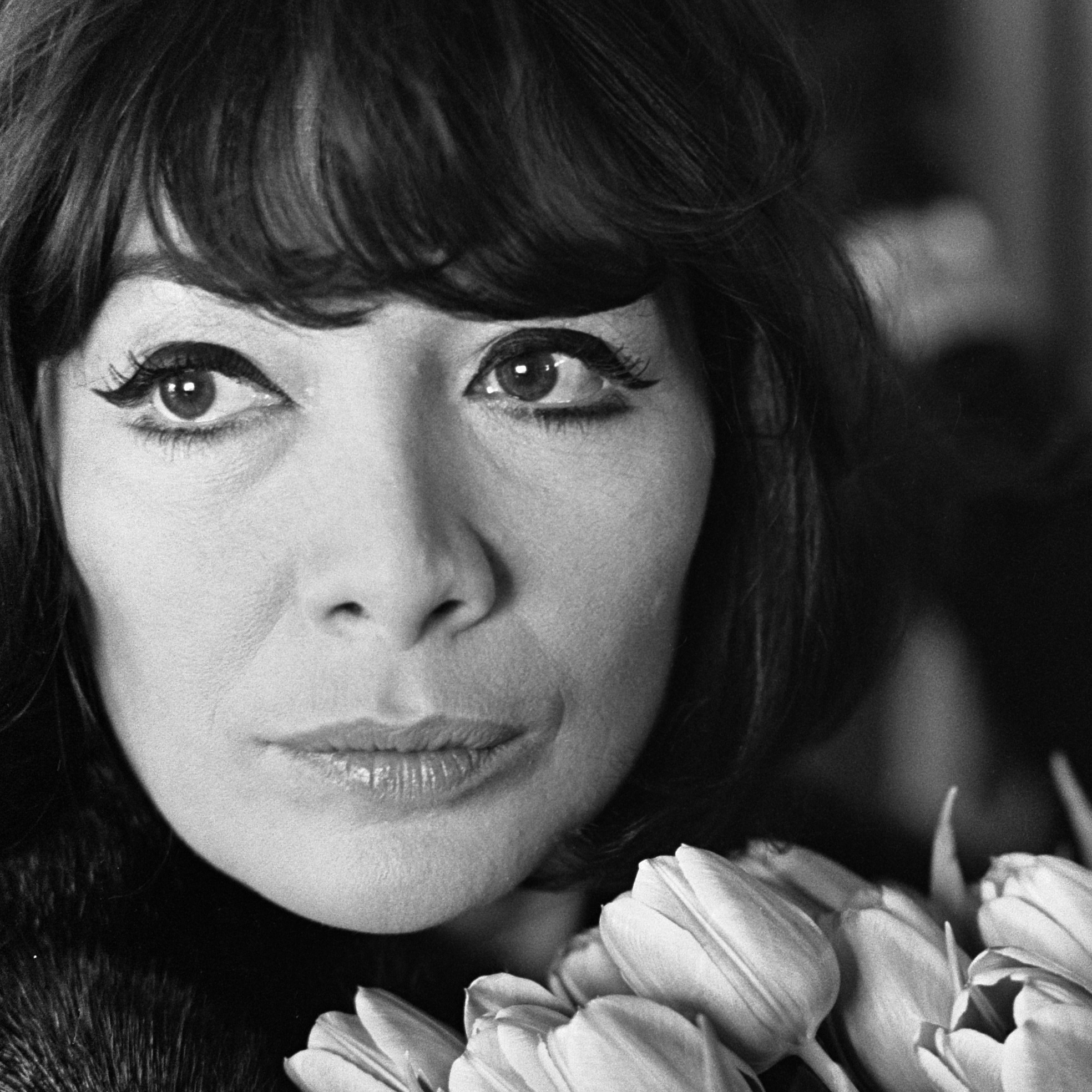
- Gréco in 1966

Background information
- Born: 7 February 1927; Montpellier, France
- Died: 23 September 2020 (aged 93) Ramatuelle, France
- Genres: Chanson; cabaret
- Occupations: Singer; actress
- Years active: 1946–2016
- Labels: Philips; Barclay; RCA Victor; Disques Meys
- Spouses: Philippe Lemaire (m. 1953; div. 1956); Michel Piccoli (m. 1966; div. 1977); Gérard Jouannest (m. 1988; died 2018)

Juliette Gréco (French: [ʒyljɛt ɡʁeko]; 7 February 1927 – 23 September 2020) was a French singer and actress. She often sang tracks with lyrics written by French poets such as Jacques Prévert and Boris Vian, as well as singers like Jacques Brel and Charles Aznavour. Her 60-year career concluded with her final worldwide tour titled "Merci", which was held between 2015–16.

As an actress, Gréco played roles in films by French directors such as Jean Cocteau and Jean-Pierre Melville.

== Early life ==
Juliette Gréco was born in Montpellier, France, to an absent Corsican father, Gérard Gréco; her mother Juliette Lafeychine (1899–1978) was from Bordeaux. Her lineage hails in part from Greece. She did not receive love from her mother in her childhood and suffered from her harsh comments due to being an unwanted child, such as "You ain't my daughter. You're the child of rape". She was raised by her maternal grandparents in Bordeaux with her older sister Charlotte. After the death of her grandparents, her mother took them to Paris. In 1938, she became a ballerina at the Opéra Garnier.

When World War II began, the family returned to the southwest of France. Gréco was a student at the Institut Royal d'éducation Sainte Jeanne d'Arc in Montauban. The Gréco family became active in the Resistance, and her mother was arrested in 1943. The two sisters decided to move back to Paris but were captured and tortured by the Gestapo, then imprisoned in Fresnes Prison in September 1943. Her mother and sister were deported to Ravensbrück while Juliette, being only 16, remained in prison for several months before being released. After her release, she walked the eight miles back to Paris to retrieve her belongings from the Gestapo headquarters. Her former French teacher and her mother's friend, Hélène Duc, decided to take care of her.

In 1945, Gréco's mother and sister returned from deportation after the liberation of Ravensbrück by the Red Army. Gréco moved to Saint-Germain-des-Prés in 1945 after her mother moved to Indochina, leaving Gréco and her sister behind.

== Bohemian lifestyle ==
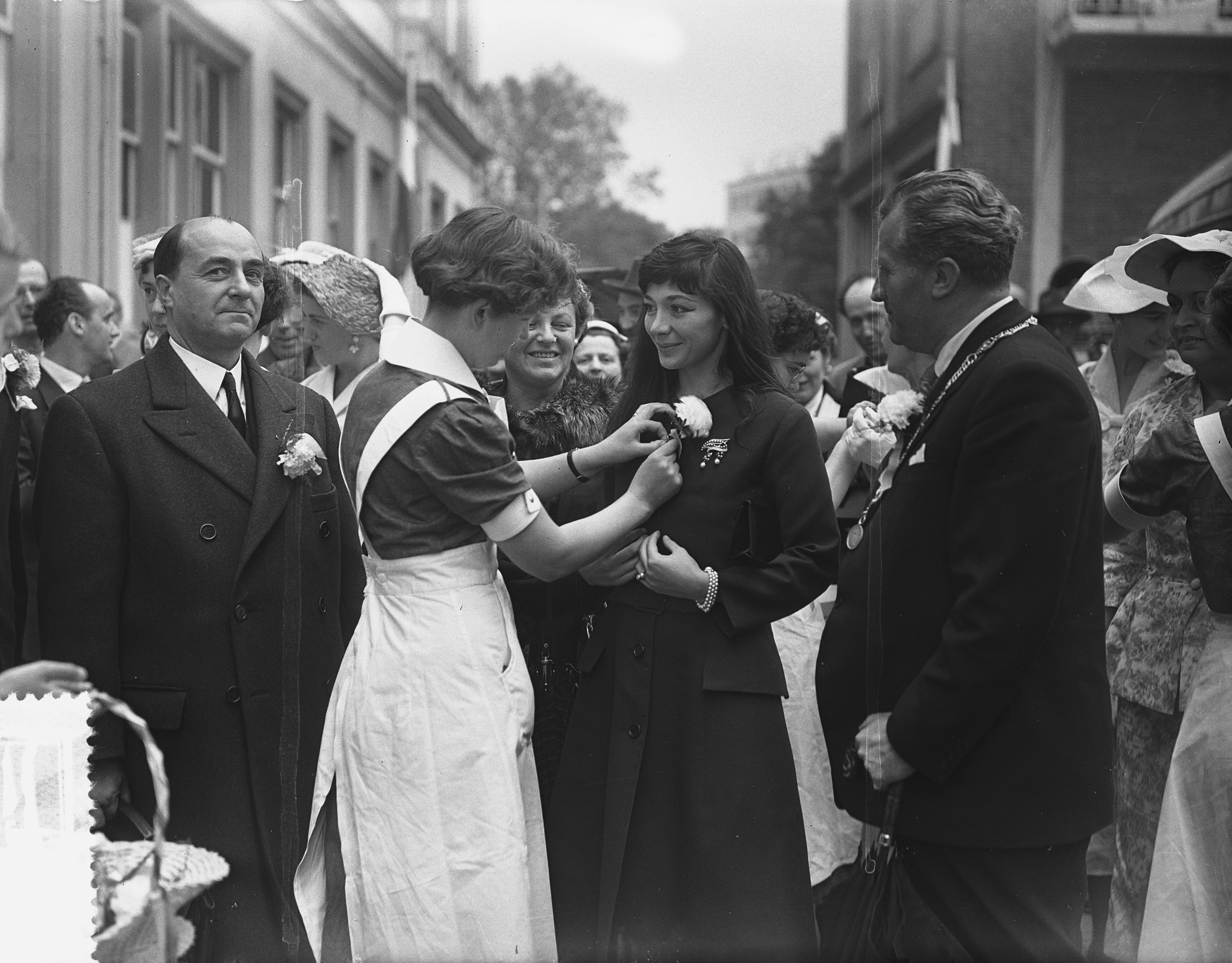
Gréco in 1955

Gréco became a devotee of the bohemian fashion of some intellectuals of post-war France. Duc sent her to attend acting classes given by Solange Sicard. She made her debut in the play Victor ou les Enfants au pouvoir in November 1946 and began to host a radio show dedicated to poetry.

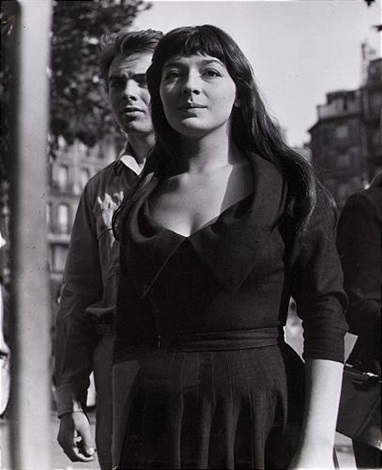
Gréco and Erskine Caldwell photographed by Emmy Andriesse in 1948

Her friend Jean-Paul Sartre installed her at the Hotel La Louisiane and commented that Greco had "millions of poems in her voice". She was known to many of the writers and artists working in Saint-Germain-des-Prés, such as Albert Camus, Jacques Prévert and Boris Vian, thus gaining the nickname la Muse de l'existentialisme.

Gréco spent the post-Liberation years frequenting the Saint-Germain-des-Prés cafes, immersing herself in political and philosophical bohemian culture. As a regular at music and poetry venues like Le Tabou on Rue Dauphine, she was acquainted with Jean Cocteau, and was given a role in Cocteau's film Orphée (1950).

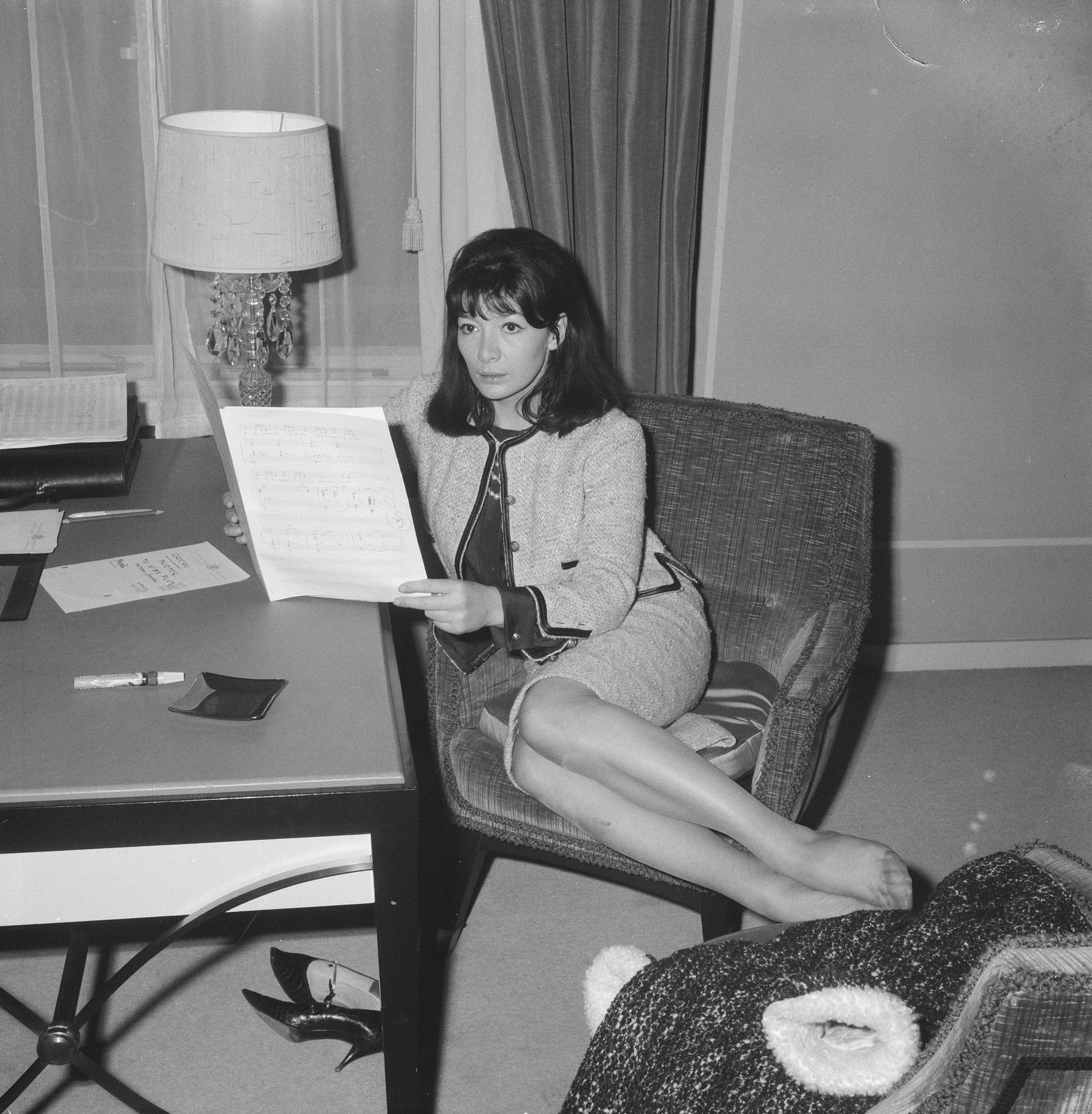
Gréco in Amsterdam, 1962

She made her debut as a cabaret singer in the Parisian cabaret Le Bœuf sur le toit in 1949, performing the lyrics of a number of well-known French writers; Raymond Queneau's "Si tu t'imagines" was one of her earliest songs to become popular.

== Film career ==
She made her film debut in Les frères Bouquinquant (1947) and appeared in several French films. When Darryl F. Zanuck saw her photo in Time, she was offered a role in The Sun Also Rises (1957), and it led to other Hollywood-financed films.

== Personal life ==
Gréco married three times: actor Philippe Lemaire (1953–1956), actor Michel Piccoli (1966–1977), and pianist Gérard Jouannest (1988–2018; his death). With Lemaire, she had a daughter, Laurence-Marie (1954–2016), who died from cancer at age 62.

In the year leading up to his death in January 1949, Gréco was the lover of married racing driver Jean-Pierre Wimille and suffered a miscarriage after his death. According to Spanish writer Manuel Vicent, Juliette Gréco was Albert Camus's lover. She also was in relationships with French singer Sacha Distel and Hollywood producer Darryl F. Zanuck. In 1949, she began an affair with the American jazz musician Miles Davis; in 1957, they decided to always be just lovers because their careers were in different countries and his fear of damaging her career by being in an interracial relationship, and they ultimately remained friends until his death in 1991. Gréco also dated U.S. record producer Quincy Jones. According to Jones' autobiography, Davis was irritated with him for years when he found out.

Gréco had three rhinoplasties: in Paris in 1953 and 1956, and in London in 1960.

In September 1965, Gréco attempted suicide by an overdose of sleeping pills. She was found unconscious in her bathroom and taken to the hospital by Françoise Sagan.

Gréco lived between Paris and Saint-Tropez. A leftist, she supported François Mitterrand in the 1974 presidential election, and was an initial investor in Minute, when it was mainly non-political and focused on the entertainment world.

Gréco died on 23 September 2020 at the age of 93.

== Legacy ==
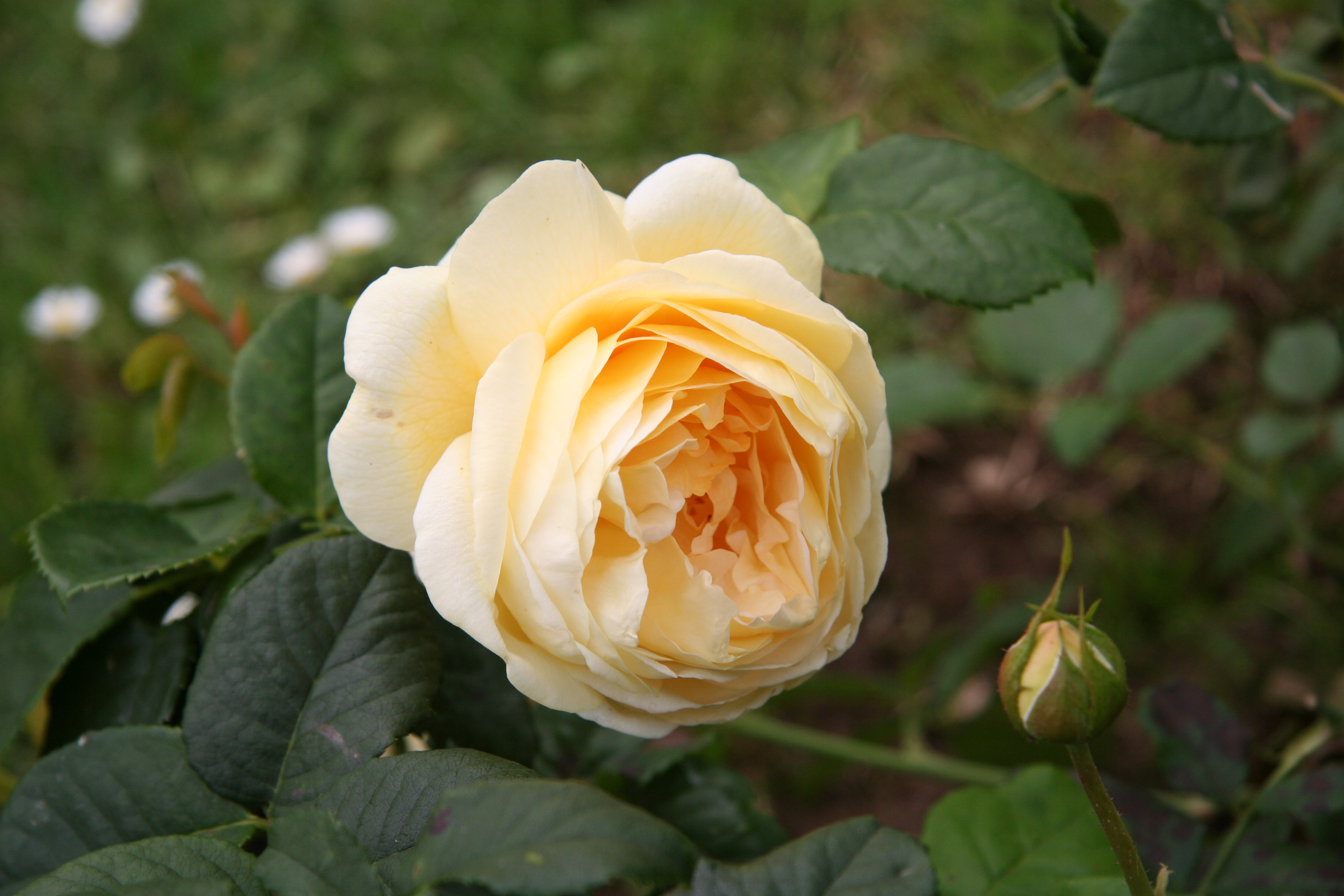
The "Juliette Gréco" rose at the Roseraie de Bagatelle

Gréco was portrayed by actress Anna Mouglalis in the film Gainsbourg: A Heroic Life (2010).

Jean-Paul Sartre based the singer in his trilogy The Roads to Freedom (Les chemins de la liberté) on Gréco.

An allusion to Gréco is made by English singer Ray Davies in the song "Art School Babe" from his album Storyteller.

"Michelle" by the Beatles was inspired by Gréco and the Parisian Left Bank culture. Paul McCartney said of the song: "We'd tag along to these parties, and it was at the time of people like Juliette Greco, the French bohemian thing. They'd all wear black turtleneck sweaters, it's kind of where we got all that from, and we fancied Juliette like mad. Have you ever seen her? Dark hair, real chanteuse, really happening. So I used to pretend to be French, and I had this song that turned out later to be 'Michelle'."

John Lennon wrote in Skywriting by Word of Mouth: "I'd always had a fantasy about a woman who would be a beautiful, intelligent, dark-haired, high-cheek-boned, free-spirited artist à la Juliette Gréco."

Marianne Faithfull said of Gréco: "When I was a young girl, Juliette Gréco was my absolute idol...She's my role model for life. If I want to be anybody, I want to be Juliette Gréco."

In 1999, a rose was named after her by Georges Delbard under the name of "Juliette Gréco".

On 23 September 2021, "Place Juliette Gréco" was inaugurated in Paris. It can be found beside the Church of Saint-Germain-des-Pres, in the 6th arrondissement of Paris.

For the Dior Fall/Winter 2023-2024 collection, Maria Grazia Chiuri paid tribute to Gréco.

== Decorations ==
- Commander of the Legion of Honour (2012): Officer (2002); Knight (1984)
- National Order of Merit (2015): Commander (2006); Officer (1999)
- Commander of the Order of Arts and Letters (2016)

== Autobiographies ==
- 1982: Jujube (published in French), Stock
- 2012: Je suis faite comme ça, Flammarion

== Notable songs ==
- 1950: La Rue des Blancs-Manteaux written by Jean-Paul Sartre and composed by Joseph Kosma.
- 1950: Si tu t'imagines: written by Raymond Queneau and composed by Joseph Kosma.
- 1950: La Fourmi: written by Robert Desnos and composed by Joseph Kosma.
- 1951: Je suis comme je suis: written by Jacques Prévert and composed by Joseph Kosma.
- 1951: Les Feuilles mortes: from the movie Les Portes de la nuit, written by Jacques Prévert and composed by Joseph Kosma.
- 1951: Sous le ciel de Paris: from the movie Sous le ciel de Paris : written by Jean Dréjac and composed by Hubert Giraud.
- 1951: Je hais les dimanches: written by Charles Aznavour and composed by Florence Véran.
- 1953: La Fiancée du pirate: extract from L'Opéra de quat'sous.
- 1954: Coin de rue: written and composed by Charles Trenet.
- 1955: Chanson pour l'Auvergnat: written and composed by Georges Brassens.
- 1957: Musique Mécanique: written by Boris Vian and composed by André Popp.
- 1957: La Complainte du téléphone: written by François Billetdoux and composed by André Popp.
- 1959: De Pantin à Pékin: written by Pierre Delanoë and composed by André Popp.
- 1959: Il était une oie : written and composed by Serge Gainsbourg.
- 1960: Il n'y a plus d’après : written and composed by Guy Béart.
- 1961: On n'oublie rien : written by Jacques Brel.
- 1961: Jolie Môme: written and composed by Léo Ferré.
- 1961: C'était bien (Le P'tit bal perdu): written by Robert Nyel and composed by Gaby Verlor.
- 1961: Le Temps passé : written and composed by Georges Brassens.
- 1961: Chandernagor: written and composed by Guy Béart.
- 1962: Accordéon: written and composed by Serge Gainsbourg.
- 1962: Paris Canaille : written and composed by Léo Ferré.
- 1963: La Javanaise : written and composed by Serge Gainsbourg.
- 1966: Un petit poisson, un petit oiseau : written by Jean-Max Rivière and composed by Gérard Bourgeois.
- 1967: Déshabillez-moi : written by Robert Nyel and composed by Gaby Verlor.
- 1970: Les Pingouins : written and composed by Frédéric Botton.
- 1971: La Chanson des vieux amants : written by Jacques Brel and composed by Gérard Jouannest.
- 1971: J'arrive: written by Jacques Brel and composed by Gérard Jouannest.
- 1972: Mon fils chante: written by Maurice Fanon and composed by Gérard Jouannest.
- 1977: Non monsieur je n'ai pas vingt ans: written by Henri Gougaud and composed by Gérard Jouannest.
- 1983: Le Temps des cerises: written by Jean Baptiste Clément and composed by Antoine Renard.
- 1988: Ne me quitte pas : written and composed by Jacques Brel.
- 2006: La Chanson de Prévert: written and composed by Serge Gainsbourg.
- 2009: Le Déserteur: written and composed by Boris Vian.

== Filmography ==
- 1947: The Bouquinquant Brothers (by Louis Daquin) – Une religieuse
- 1948: Ulysse ou les mauvaises rencontres (Short, by Alexandre Astruc)
- 1949: The Sinners (by Julien Duvivier) – Rachel
- 1950: Orphée (by Jean Cocteau) – Aglaonice
- 1951: Sans laisser d'adresse (by Jean-Paul Le Chanois) – La chanteuse
- 1952: The Green Glove (by Rudolph Maté) – Singer
- 1953: When You Read This Letter (by Jean-Pierre Melville) – Thérèse Voise
- 1953: Saluti e baci (by Maurice Labro and Giorgio Simonelli) – Herself
- 1953: Boum sur Paris (by Maurice de Canonge) – Juliette Gréco
- 1956: Elena and Her Men (by Jean Renoir) – Miarka, la gitane
- 1956: La Châtelaine du Liban (by Richard Pottier) – Maroussia
- 1956: Man and Child (by Raoul André) – Nicky Nistakos
- 1957: The Sun Also Rises (by Henry King) – Georgette Aubin
- 1957: C'est arrivé à 36 chandelles (by Henri Diamant-Berger) – Herself
- 1957: Œil pour œil (by André Cayatte)
- 1958: The Naked Earth (by Vincent Sherman) – Maria
- 1958: The Roots of Heaven (by John Huston) – Minna
- 1958: Bonjour tristesse (by Otto Preminger) – Herself
- 1959: Whirlpool (by Lewis Allen) – Lora
- 1960: Crack in the Mirror (by Richard Fleischer) – Eponine / Florence
- 1961: The Big Gamble (by Richard Fleischer) – Marie
- 1962: Where the Truth Lies (by Henri Decoin) – Myriam Heller
- 1963: Canzoni nel mondo (by Vittorio Sala) – Herself
- 1964: The Chase (by Michel Boisrond) – Une invitée au spectacle de Sylvie Vartan
- 1964: Love at Sea (by Guy Gilles) – L'actrice du film
- 1965: Uncle Tom's Cabin (by Géza von Radványi) – Dinah
- 1967: The Night of the Generals (by Anatole Litvak) – Juliette
- 1967: Le Désordre à vingt ans (Documentary, by Jacques Baratier) – Herself
- 1973: Le Far West (by Jacques Brel)
- 1975: Lily aime-moi (by Maurice Dugowson) – Flo
- 1999: Lettre à mon frère Guy Gilles, cinéaste trop tôt disparu (Documentary, by Luc Bernard) – Herself
- 2001: Paris à tout prix (Documentary, by Yves Jeuland) – Herself
- 2001: Belphégor, le fantôme du Louvre (by Jean-Paul Salomé) – Woman in the cemetery
- 2002: Jedermanns Fest (by Fritz Lehner) – Yvonne Becker

== TV show ==
- 1965: Belphegor, or Phantom of the Louvre

== Theatre ==
- 1946: Victor ou les Enfants au pouvoir (by Roger Vitrac at the Théâtre de la Gaîté-Montparnasse)
- 1955: Anastasia (by Marcelle Maurette at the Théâtre Antoine)
- 1964: Bonheur, impair et passe (by Françoise Sagan at the Théâtre Édouard VII)

== Sources ==
- Antony Beevor and Artemis Cooper. Paris After the Liberation, 1944–1949. London: Penguin, 1994. pp. 315–320.
- Boggio, Philippe. Boris Vian (pp. 152–154)
- Davis, Miles, Miles (pp. 126–127)
