= Il Ballo del Doge =

Venetian masquerade ball

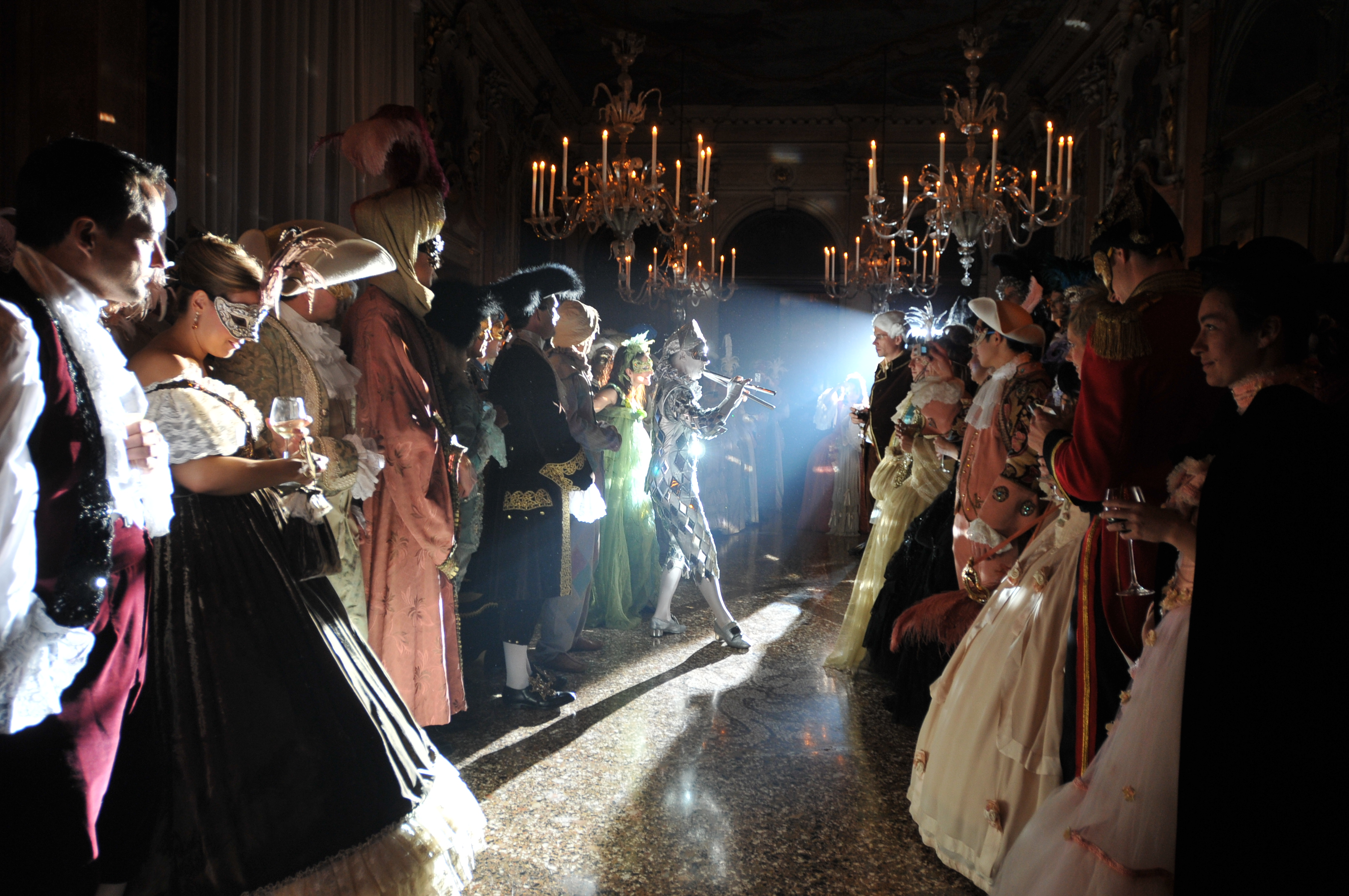
A scene from Il Ballo del Doge

Il Ballo del Doge ("The Doge’s Ball") is a Venetian masquerade ball, one of the many events held annually during the Carnival of Venice. The ball itself is held in the 15th-century Venetian palace of Palazzo Pisani Moretta, situated on the Grand Canal in Venice. The ball's name derives from the title of the elected heads (Doge, "Duke" in English) who ruled Venice up until the fall of the Venetian republic in the 18th century. Every year the ball is attended by around four hundred guests dressed in period costume and masked.

The event is a reconstruction of an 18th-century masquerade ball and includes a meal of Venetian cuisine. Over the years the entertainment has included performances by opera singers, musicians, burlesque artists and characters from the Commedia dell'Arte.

== History ==
Il Ballo del Doge began in Venice in 1994, and takes place every year in Venice during the Carnival. Every edition of Il Ballo del Doge has a different theme. The inventor, Antonia Sautter, is a fashion designer and luxury events manager both in Venice and internationally. Attendees throughout the years defined it as the most sumptuous, refined and exclusive masquerade event in the world, and one of the one-hundred things everyone should do at least once in their lifetime. Il Ballo del Doge has been described by Vanity Fair as "one of the most exclusive parties in the world." Guests have included members of European, Middle Eastern and Asian royal families, celebrities, and leaders in international business and finance.

== See also ==
- Venetian Festival
