= Suzy Willson =

British director and choreographer (born 1970)

- Born: 1970 (age 55–56); Northwood, Middlesex, England
- Education: University of Manchester; École internationale de théâtre Jacques Lecoq
- Occupations: Director and choreographer

Suzy Willson (born 1970) is a British director and choreographer. Willson is co-artistic director of London-based performance company Clod Ensemble.

== Early life and education ==
Willson was born in Northwood, Middlesex, in 1970. She graduated with a degree in drama from Manchester University before going on to study at L'École Internationale de Théâtre Jacques Lecoq.

== Career ==
Willson founded London-based performance company Clod Ensemble in 1995 with composer Paul Clark and has directed all of their productions to date.

Her body of work "defies categorisation" and crosses the boundaries of theatrical and choreographic practice, working with different combinations of dancers, musicians, actors and independent performers. Her productions take place in traditional theatres and dance houses, but also in found spaces and outdoor locations. Her performance work sometimes takes inspiration from medical themes and explores ways of seeing, thinking about and experiencing the human body.

Recent works include: Placebo – a piece in which seven dancers explore the placebo effect commissioned by The Place; choral lament Silver Swan in Tate Modern’s Turbine Hall (2011); Red Ladies – a piece for 18 identically dressed women performed across an entire city (locations include London with Southbank Centre, Porto with Serralves Museum, Margate, with Turner Contemporary); An Anatomie in Four Quarters – a site specific performance originally created for the entire auditorium of Sadlers Wells, London (2012) and Under Glass – a piece in which all the performers are in glass boxes and jars (Sadlers Wells 2009–2017), which won a Total Theatre Award for Physical / Visual Theatre in 2009.

Willson’s work is an advocate for role of the arts in healthcare education She is a regular contributor to journals and books on both performance and medicine (see selected journal articles and book chapters below) and an Honorary Professor at Barts and The London School of Medicine and Dentistry.

Willson pioneered the award-winning Performing Medicine programme which encourages people working in healthcare to appreciate the choreographic, non-verbal and spatial dimensions of care. Performing Medicine has been cited as an example of best practice in the 2017 report from the All Party Parliamentary Group on Arts, Health and Wellbeing.

== Selected journal articles and book chapters ==
- Willson, Suzy, and P. Jaye (2017), "Arts based learning for a Circle of Care", Lancet 390: 642–643
- Willson, Suzy (2007), "Drama for doctors", Lancet 369: 1782
- Willson, Suzy (2006), "What can the arts bring to medical training", Lancet 368: S15–S1
- Willson, Suzy (2016), "Moving Medicine", in Routledge Companion to Jacques Lecoq, edited by Mark Evans and Rick Kemp (London: Routledge).
- Willson, Suzy (2016), "An Anatomie in Four Quarters: Rehearsal Notes", in Performance and the Medical Body, edited by Alex Mermikides and Gianna Bouchard (New York: Bloomsbury Methuen Drama)
- Willson, Suzy (2014), "Clod Ensemble: Performing Medicine", Performance Research: A Journal of the Performing Arts 19.4: 31–37.
