= George Washington Vanderbilt =

George Washington Vanderbilt may refer to:

- George Washington Vanderbilt, son of Cornelius Vanderbilt who died during the American Civil War
- George Washington Vanderbilt II (1862–1914), American art collector
- George Washington Vanderbilt III (1914–1961), American yachtsman and scientific explorer

== See also ==
- George Washington Vanderbilt House
- Vanderbilt family
