= CosmoProf =

Series of beauty and cosmetics trade shows

Cosmoprof is a series of beauty and cosmetics trade shows that occur in locations around the world. The flagship event in Bologna has been in existence since 1967 and draws 2,300 exhibitors from seventy countries and more than 170,000 visitors.

== Flagship Event in Bologna ==
It generally happens in the middle of March, along Cosmopack, a packaging cosmetic trade show. All the cosmetics specialities are represented within more than 20 halls: Makeup, haircare, skincare, etc.

There are 2 special halls: "Country Pavilion", that gathers rock star companies from every countries, and "Prime", that gathers rising stars from all the industry.
