= Belphegor, Phantom of the Louvre =

2001 film by Jean-Paul Salomé

- Theatrical release poster
- Directed by: Jean-Paul Salomé
- Written by: Jean-Paul Salomé; Danièle Thompson; Jérôme Tonnerre
- Produced by: Alain Sarde; Christine Gozlan
- Starring: Sophie Marceau; Michel Serrault; Frédéric Diefenthal; Julie Christie
- Cinematography: Jean-François Robin
- Edited by: Suzy Elmiger
- Music by: Bruno Coulais
- Distributed by: BAC Films
- Release date: 4 April 2001 (France)
- Running time: 97 minutes
- Country: France
- Language: French
- Budget: FRF105,000,000 (estimated)
- Box office: Europe Admissions : 3,783,892

Belphegor, Phantom of the Louvre (French: Belphégor – Le fantôme du Louvre) is a 2001 French fantasy film directed by Jean-Paul Salomé. It stars Sophie Marceau, Michel Serrault, Frédéric Diefenthal, and Julie Christie. It was written by Salomé, Danièle Thompson, and Jérôme Tonnerre. The 2001 film is about a mummy's spirit that possesses a woman (Marceau) in the Louvre. Belphegor, Phantom of the Louvre was filmed on location at the Musée du Louvre, the first feature film to be shot in part inside the world-famous museum.

== Source material ==
This adaptation was loosely based upon the 1927 Arthur Bernède horror novel Belphégor, which had appeared in concert with a film serial version of the story. A television miniseries had appeared in 1965. Juliette Gréco, who was the original Belphégor in the television miniseries, makes a cameo appearance as the woman in the cemetery

== Plot ==
A rare collection of artifacts from an archeological dig in Egypt are brought to the famous Musée du Louvre in Paris. While experts are using a laser scanning device to determine the age of a sarcophagus, a spirit escapes and makes its way into the museum's electrical system. Museum curator Faussier (Jean-Francois Balmer) brings in noted Egyptologist, Glenda Spender (Julie Christie), to examine the findings, and she announces that the mummy inside the coffin was actually the evil spirit Belphegor.

Meanwhile, Lisa (Sophie Marceau), a young woman who lives across the street from the museum, follows her runaway cat into the Louvre after closing time. She accidentally receives an electrical shock that transfers the stray spirit into her body. Soon Lisa is disguising herself as Belphegor and making off with the rare Egyptian treasures on display at the museum, convinced that they are rightfully hers. When Belphegor proves more than a match for the Louvre's security forces, renowned detective Verlac (Michel Serrault) is brought out of retirement to find out why the museum's Egyptian collection has been shrinking.

== Cast ==
- Sophie Marceau as Lisa / Belphegor
- Michel Serrault as Verlac
- Frédéric Diefenthal as Martin
- Julie Christie as Glenda Spender
- Jean-François Balmer as Bertrand Faussier
- Patachou as Geneviève
- Lionel Abelanski as Simonnet
- Françoise Lépine as Suzanne Dupré
- François Levantal as Mangin
- Jacques Martial as Félix
- Philippe Maymat as Bob
- Pierre Aussedat as Pierre Desfontaines
- Laurent Bateau as Louvre warden
- Matteo Vallon as Cemetery employee
- Jean-Claude Bolle-Reddat as Cemetery warden
- Juliette Gréco as Woman in the cemetery

== Reception ==
=== Critical response ===
Critical reception for Belphegor, Phantom of the Louvre has been mostly negative. Justin Felix from DVD Talk gave the film a mixed two and a half out of five stars, writing, "Belphegor: Phantom of the Louvre is modestly entertaining, despite some very familiar plot elements and so-so CGI work." Chris Parry from eFilmCritic awarded the film two out of five stars, panning the film's acting, special effects, screenplay, and familiar premise. Steve Barton from Dread Central rated the film two and a half out of five stars, writing, "For all that it has going for it in the acting department, Belphégor Phantom of the Louvre comes up on the short side of the fence nearly everywhere else. It's a decent little time killer, but you'll ultimately start forgetting about it even before the end credits run."
