= Paul Clark (composer) =

Composer based in London

Paul Clark is a composer based in London.

== Early life and education ==
Clark was born in West Kirby in 1968. He studied classical guitar with Lee Sollory.

== Career ==
Clark co-founded Clod Ensemble with director Suzy Willson in London in 1995. He has co-created all the company’s productions to date and written critically acclaimed scores for each – ranging from totally acoustic works, to multi speaker installations.

With Clod Ensemble, recent works include dance theatre piece On The High Road (Southbank Centre's Queen Elizabeth Hall, 2019); Silver Swan (Tate Modern Turbine Hall, 2011), an acapella piece for seven classical singers; An Anatomie in Four Quarters (Sadler’s Wells, Wales Millennium Centre in Cardiff and The Lowry, Salford 2012–2016) which features electronics, live orchestral music and a rock band; and It’s a Small House and We’ve Lived in It Always, a blues-inspired collaboration with Split Britches. Clark also composed music for Clod Ensemble's Under Glass (Sadler’s Wells, London 2009-2017), a surround-sound installation and winner of the 2009 Total Theatre Award for Physical and Visual Theatre.

He has written music for and with artists including Manchester Camerata, Osterreichisches Ensemble fur Neue Musik, Caoimhín Ó Raghallaigh, Welsh National Opera, Opera North, Sinfonia Cymru, Annie Whitehead, Renee Fleming, Danger Mouse, Mark E Smith and Melanie Pappenheim. Clark has written dozens of scores for theatre in the UK and internationally including for director Katie Mitchell for whom he has written more than twenty scores, including Cleansed (National Theatre, London) and Wunschkonzert (Schauspiel Koln), and Irish company Gare St Lazare with whom he created Here All Night using texts by Samuel Beckett (Lincoln Center for the Performing Arts in New York, Brighton Festival and touring 2013-18). He wrote the score for the National Theatre’s production of The Cat In The Hat, which is now licensed by Music Theatre International and has toured across the U.S.. In Spring 2019, Clark composed the score for Norma Jeane Baker of Troy featuring Renee Fleming and Ben Wishaw, as part the inaugural season at The Shed, New York.

In 1998, Clark was awarded a fellowship from The Arts Foundation for opera composition.

In TV and film, Clark composed music for Simon Amstell's television show Grandma’s House, which aired on BBC Two in 2010. He has collaborated with Arnaud Desplechin, John Michael McDonagh, Emily Young and Christine Gernon, and wrote the music for the David Sedaris audiobook Squirrel Seeks Chipmunk. Clark's other works include The Weather Man (Opera North), Liebeslied/My Suicides (ICA/Genesis Foundation), and many multimedia events, including the 500th anniversary of Hampton Court Palace.
