= Clod Ensemble =

Performance company in London, United Kingdom

Clod Ensemble is a performance company and registered charity based in London, UK. Founded in 1995 by director Suzy Willson and composer Paul Clark, the company creates performances, workshops and other events in the UK and internationally.

== Artistic work ==
Each production has a unique visual identity and distinctive musical score, ranging from acoustic work to multi-speaker installations. Performances take place in theatre spaces, festivals, galleries and public spaces including Sadler's Wells, Tate Modern's Turbine Hall, Serralves Museum Porto and Public Theatre New York. Their work explores the relationship of music and movement, bodies and spaces. Performances sometimes draw on medical themes and the complex relationship we have with our bodies and the medical profession.

Selected performances include Silver Swan, featuring a choir of seven unaccompanied singers, Under Glass, where performers are contained within glass cases, from a jam jar to a test tube; An Anatomie in Four Quarters in which the audience cut a path through the auditorium of a large theatre; MUST, a collaboration with New York performance artist Peggy Shaw; and Red Ladies, in which a chorus of identically dressed women transform, celebrate and interrupt the familiar streets of a city.

They run a programme of education and participation projects in schools, higher education institutions and NHS Trusts. Their award-winning Performing Medicine project delivers courses, workshops and events which draw on techniques and ideas in the arts to provide training to medical students and healthcare professionals. Performing Medicine was cited an example of best practice in the 2017 report from the All-Party Parliamentary Group on Arts, Health and Wellbeing.

They are recipient of a Sustaining Excellence Grant from Wellcome Trust and are an Arts Council England National Portfolio Organisation.

== List of productions ==
Direction and Choreography by Suzy Willson. Music by Paul Clark.

Title	First Performance	Revivals	Notes
Feast During the Plague	1995, Battersea Arts Centre, London		
Musical Scenes	1995, Battersea Arts Centre, London	1996, Battersea Arts Centre, London. HaDivadlo Theater, Brno-střed, Czech Republic.	
Metamorphoses	1996, Battersea Arts Centre, London	UK Tour including Oxford Playhouse.	Text by Peter Oswald.
The Overcoat	1998, Battersea Arts Centre, London	UK Tour	Referenced in: Drawing attention to the significant: exploring the functions of music in The Overcoat (1998) by Millie Taylor
Silver Swan	1999, Battersea Arts Centre, London	Victoria & Albert Museum, London (2002). McEwan Hall, Edinburgh (2005). The Linbury Studio, Royal Opera House. Turbine Hall, Tate Modern, London (2012).	Based on two 17th Century songs by William Lawes and John Smith. Referenced in: An Inventory of Falling by Suzy Willson
Lady Grey	1999, Purcell Room, Southbank Centre, London		
It's a Small House and We Lived in it Always	1999, Purcell Room, Southbank Centre, London	International Touring Double Bill Double Agency with Miss Risqué, including La Mama Experimental Theatre Club, New York (2002).	A collaboration with Split Britches.
Miss Risqué	2001, Nuffield Theatre, Lancaster University	International Touring (see above)	A collaboration with Split Britches.
For One Night Only	2002, Battersea Arts Centre, London		A selection of short pieces including Wrestling, Trapeze and Egg&Spoon.
Kiss My Echo	2002, Battersea Arts Centre, London		
Greed	2003, Battersea Arts Centre, London	UK and international tour including Bristol Old Vic	
Red Ladies	2005, Trafalgar Square, London as part of British Architecture Week (outdoor interventions). 2006, Hackney Empire (Theatrical Demonstration).	UK and international revivals 2005 – 2024 including: Hastings in association with Coastal Currents Arts Festival (2015). Margate in association with Turner Contemporary and Margate Theatre Royal (2014). Porto and at the Serralves Museum, Portugal. (2008). Institute of Contemporary Arts, London (2008). Warwick Arts Centre (2006). Raphael Gallery, Victoria & Albert Museum, London (2024)	Text by Peter Oswald. Referenced in: Red Ladies: Who are they and What do they Want? by Suzy Willson and Helen Eastman.
Must	2007, Wellcome Collection, London	UK and international tour, including Public Theater, New York as part of Under the Radar Festival	Written by Peggy Shaw & Suzy Willson. Performed by Peggy Shaw. Referenced in: A Menopausal Gentleman: The Solo Performances of Peggy Shaw by Jill Dolan and Queering the Temporality of Cancer Survivorship and Jackie Stacey & Mary Bryson.
Under Glass	2009, Sadler's Wells - off-site at Village Underground, London	UK and international tour 2009 – 2019	Village Text by Alice Oswald. Winner of Total Theatre Award for Visual Theatre 2009. Referenced in: The Pain of Specimenhood by Gianna Bouchard.
An Anatomie in Four Quarters	2009, Sadler's Wells, London	Wales Millennium Centre, Cardiff (2013) The Lowry, Salford (2016)	Referenced in: Clod Ensemble: Performing Medicine by Suzy Willson.
Zero	2013, Sadler's Wells, London	UK Tour (2013) Clod Ensemble Studios, London (2025)	
The Red Chair	2015, Live at LICA, Lancaster	England tour (2015) Scotland tour (2017)	Written and performed by Sarah Cameron. Published by Methuen Publishing. Winner Argus Award
Snow	2018, Kings Place, London as part of Noh Reimagined Festival		Text by Suzy Willson & Peggy Shaw.
Placebo	2018, The Lowry, Salford	UK Tour (2018) including The Place, London	Including My Lonely Lungs monologue written with Peggy Shaw. Design by Art School.
On The High Road	2019, Queen Elizabeth Hall, Southbank Centre, London	UK Tour (2019)	Including Madam Wu monologue written with Peggy Shaw.
This is My Room	2021, The Rose Lipman Building, Hackney, London		Musical contributions by Manchester Collective and Damsel Elysium.
The Black Saint and the Sinner Lady	2023, Shoreditch Town Hall, London as part of EFG London Jazz Festival.	Barbican Centre, London (2024)	Collaboration with Nu Civilisation Orchestra. Original music by Charles Mingus, Paul Clark , Peter Edwards and Romarna Campbell. Shortlisted for 2024 Sky Arts Awards.

== Other Productions ==
Title	First Performance	Revivals	Notes
Pierrot Lunaire	1998, Battersea Arts Centre, London	1999, Battersea Arts Centre, London	Music by Arnold Schoenberg. Translation by Alice Oswald.
Songs for the Dead	2000, Battersea Arts Centre, London	2001, Battersea Arts Centre, London	Including music by Purcell, Schnittke, Paul Clark, Elliot Carter and Ligeti.
Swing Night	2006, Battersea Town Hall, London	2012, Stoke Newington Town Hall as part of London Creativity and Wellbeing Week	With Gordon Campbell Big Band
