= Barry Ward (actor) =

Irish actor

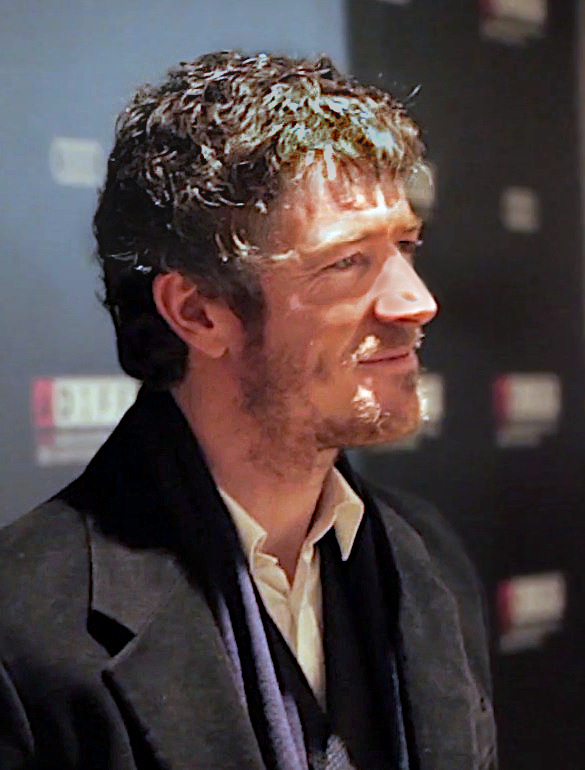
- Ward at the 2016 Dublin International Film Festival
- Born: Dublin, Ireland
- Education: Maynooth University
- Occupation: Actor
- Years active: 1994–present
- Children: 1

Barry Ward is an Irish actor. He began his career in the RTÉ/BBC series Family (1994) and Plotlands (1997), and the film Sunburn (1999). His films since include Jimmy's Hall, Blood Cells (both 2014), Extra Ordinary (2019), and Dating Amber (2020), the latter of which won him an IFTA.

On television, he is more recently known for his roles in the RTÉ series Rebellion (2016), Taken Down (2018) and Clean Sweep (2023), the Sky Atlantic series Britannia (2017–2019) and Save Me (2018–2020), and the BBC series The Capture (2019).

== Early life and education ==
Ward grew up in Blanchardstown, a northwestern suburb of Dublin. He went to school at St Declan's College in Cabra. He studied English and Philosophy at NUI Maynooth.

== Career ==
Ward made his television debut as a child actor aged 14, starring as John Paul Spencer in the 1994 BBC One and RTÉ One miniseries Family. He made his stage debut the following year in Buddleia at the Dublin Theatre Festival and London's Donmar Warehouse. He returned to television in the 1997 period drama Plotlands as Fionn Mulligan, also on BBC One. He made his feature film debut in Pip Broughton's Soft Sand, Blue Sea in 1998. He then starred alongside Cillian Murphy and Paloma Baeza in the comedy-drama film Sunburn in 1999.

In 2014, Ward played the titular role of James Gralton in Ken Loach's biographical film Jimmy's Hall, which premiered at the 67th Cannes Film Festival, and Adam in Luke Seomore and Joseph Bull's drama film Blood Cells, which premiered 71st Venice International Film Festival. He also appeared in the film Shooting for Socrates, and then starred alongside Liam Cunningham and Brendan Gleeson in the 2015 crime thriller film Pursuit.

In 2016, Ward had roles as Arthur Mahon in the RTÉ historical drama miniseries Rebellion and Dr Patrick Spencer in the third series of the BBC Two crime drama The Fall. He portrayed DUP politician Ian Paisley Jr in Nick Hamm's The Journey, and appeared in Mateo Gil's science fiction film Realive. The following year, he starred in the film Maze, and as Sawyer the first series of the Sky Atlantic series Britannia.

This was followed by a main role as Matt in the RTÉ Two crime drama Taken Down, and a recurring role as Barry McGory in the Sky Atlantic drama Save Me. He played Charlie Hall in the first series of the BBC One thriller The Capture, in 2019 and starred in the horror comedy film Extra Ordinary. For his performance in the 2020 film Dating Amber, Ward won the IFTA Award for Best Supporting Actor. Also in 2020, he played DI Steve McCusker in the ITV miniseries Des and Mike Walker in the Netflix series White Lines. He portrayed Thomas Cromwell in the Channel 5 series Anne Boleyn in 2021.

== Personal life ==
Ward lives in East London.

== Filmography ==
=== Film ===
| Year | Title | Role | Notes |
|---|---|---|---|
| 1998 | Soft Sand, Blue Sea | Trevor | |
| 1998 | Lipservice | Darren O Murchu | Short film |
| 1999 | Sunburn | Robert Fiske | |
| 1999 | Dilemmas | | Short film |
| 2000 | The Claim | Young Dillon | |
| 2001 | Watchmen | Ray | Short film |
| 2008 | Danger High Voltage | Mick | Short film |
| 2010 | The Tenement Ghost | The Groom | |
| 2011 | The Opening | Mick | Short film |
| 2012 | Songs for Amy | Rory Jarvis | |
| 2013 | The Fallen | Anthony | Short film |
| 2014 | Jimmy's Hall | James Gralton | |
| 2014 | Shooting for Socrates | Jimmy Quinn | |
| 2014 | Bypass | New Supplier | |
| 2014 | Blood Cells | Adam | |
| 2015 | L'accabadora | Albert | |
| 2015 | The Survivalist | Forager | |
| 2015 | Pursuit | Diarmuid | |
| 2015 | Insulin | The Pharmacist | Short film |
| 2016 | The Truth Commissioner | Michael Madden | |
| 2016 | Realive | Dr. West | |
| 2016 | The Journey | Ian Paisley Jr. | |
| 2017 | My Father, My Blood | Cillian | Short film |
| 2017 | Maze | Gordon Close | |
| 2017 | Take Me Swimming | Thady | Short film |
| 2018 | Time Traveller | John Paul | Short film |
| 2019 | Extra Ordinary | Martin Martin | |
| 2019 | The Yearning | Mick | Short film |
| 2019 | Lily Meets Charlie | Charlie | Short film |
| 2019 | Taxi | Henry | Short film |
| 2020 | Dating Amber | Ian | |
| 2022 | The Ulysses Project | Leopold Bloom | |
| 2022 | Burial | Tor Oleynik | |
| 2023 | Sunlight | Leon | |
| 2023 | That They May Face the Rising Sun | Joe Ruttledge | |
| 2024 | Restless | Kevin | |
| 2025 | Salvable | Paddy | |
| 2025 | On the Sea | Jack | |
| 2026 | Everybody Digs Bill Evans | Harry Evans Junior | |

=== Television ===
Key
| † | Denotes television productions that have not yet been released |

| Year | Title | Role | Notes |
|---|---|---|---|
| 1994 | Family | John Paul Spencer | Miniseries; main role |
| 1997 | Plotlands | Fionn Mulligan | Miniseries; main role |
| 2005 | ShakespeaRe-Told: Macbeth | Roddy | Television film |
| 2007 | Silent Witness | Ashley Harris | 2 episodes |
| 2008 | The Bill | Jez Jenkins | Episode: "Shadow Stalker" |
| 2008 | City of Vice | Patrick Jones | Miniseries; 1 episode |
| 2009 | Psych Ward | Jimmy Murphy | Main role |
| 2013 | Coming Up | Slick Rick | Episode: "Call it a Night" |
| 2016 | Rebellion | Arthur Mahon | Main role; miniseries (4 episodes) |
| 2016 | The Fall | Dr. Patrick Spencer | 4 episodes |
| 2017 | The End of the F***ing World | Leslie | 2 episodes |
| 2017–2019 | Britannia | Sawyer | Main role, series 1; guest, series 2–3 |
| 2018 | Taken Down | Matt | Main role |
| 2018–2020 | Save Me | Barry McGory | 9 episodes |
| 2019 | Gomorrah | Patrick | 1 episode |
| 2019 | The Capture | Charlie Hall | 6 episodes |
| 2020–2021 | Feel Good | Arnie Rivers | 2 episodes |
| 2020 | White Lines | Mike Walker | 7 episodes |
| 2020 | Des | DI Steve McCusker | Miniseries; 3 episodes |
| 2021 | Anne Boleyn | Thomas Cromwell | Miniseries; 3 episodes |
| 2022 | Pistol | John's Dad | Episode: "Track 5: Nancy and Sid" |
| 2022–2024 | Bad Sisters | Fergal Loftus | 12 episodes |
| 2023 | Clean Sweep | Jason Mohan | 6 episodes |
| 2024 | Protection | DS Paul Brandice | 6 episodes |
| 2025 | Trespasses | Victor McIntyre | 4 episodes |
| TBA | Grown Ups † | Johnnie | |

=== Music videos ===
| Song | Year | Artist | Notes |
|---|---|---|---|
| "The Golden Sands" | 2014 | Ultan Conlon | |

== Stage ==
| Year | Title | Role | Notes |
|---|---|---|---|
| 1995 | Buddleia | The Boy | Dublin Theatre Festival / Donmar Warehouse, London |
| 2000 | Down the Line | Johnny | Abbey Theatre, Dublin |
| 2000 | A Quiet Life | Gary | Abbey Theatre, Dublin |
| 2004 | Take Me Away | Kev | Project Arts Centre, Dublin Fringe Festival |
| 2008 | Lay Me Down Softly | Dean | Abbey Theatre, Dublin |

== Awards and nominations ==
| Year | Award | Category | Work | Result | Ref |
|---|---|---|---|---|---|
| 2016 | IFTA Awards | Rising Star Award | —N/a | Nominated | |
| 2016 | IFTA Awards | Best Lead Actor in a Drama | Rebellion | Nominated | |
| 2018 | IFTA Awards | Best Supporting Actor in a Film | Maze | Nominated | |
| 2020 | IFTA Awards | Best Lead Actor in a Film | Extra Ordinary | Nominated | |
| 2021 | IFTA Awards | Best Supporting Actor in a Film | Dating Amber | Won | |
