= 13th Irish Film & Television Awards =

Annual Irish media awards ceremony

13th IFTA Film & Drama Awards
- Date: 9 April 2016
- Site: Mansion House, Dublin (Film Awards)
- Hosted by: Deirdre O'Kane (Film Awards)

Highlights
- Best Film: Room
- Best Direction: Lenny Abrahamson; Room
- Best Actor: Michael Fassbender; Steve Jobs
- Best Actress: Saoirse Ronan; Brooklyn
- Most awards: Room (7)
- Most nominations: An Klondike (9)

Television coverage
- Channel: TV3 (highlights 10 April)

The 13th IFTA Film & Drama Awards took place at the Mansion House on 9 April 2016 in Dublin, honouring Irish film and television released in 2015. Deirdre O'Kane hosted the film awards ceremony. Irish Film Board Rising Star nominees were announced a week prior to the ceremony, on 31 March.

== Film Awards ==
The nominations for the IFTA Film & Drama Awards were announced on 14 March 2016.

=== Film categories ===
Best Film

- Brooklyn
- My Name Is Emily
- Room
- Sing Street
- The Survivalist
- Viva

Director in Film

- Lenny Abrahamson - Room
- Paddy Breathnach - Viva
- John Carney - Sing Street
- John Crowley - Brooklyn
- Stephen Fingleton - The Survivalist

Script Film

- John Carney - Sing Street
- Emma Donoghue - Room
- Simon Fitzmaurice - My Name Is Emily
- Mark O'Halloran - Viva
- Johnny O'Reilly - Moscow Never Sleeps

Actor in a Lead Role in a Feature Film

- Colin Farrell - The Lobster
- Michael Fassbender - Steve Jobs
- Domhnall Gleeson - Ex Machina
- Barry Keoghan - Mammal
- Martin McCann - The Survivalist

Actress in a Lead Role in a Feature Film

- Eva Birthistle - Swansong
- Ruth Bradley - Pursuit
- Orla Brady - The Price of Desire
- Evanna Lynch - My Name Is Emily
- Saoirse Ronan - Brooklyn

Actor in a Supporting Role in a Feature Film

- Sean T. Ó Meallaigh - The Callback Queen
- Jack Reynor - Sing Street
- Domhnall Gleeson - Brooklyn
- Owen Roe - Pursuit
- Michael Smiley - My Name Is Emily

Actress in a Supporting Role in a Feature Film

- Jane Brennan - Brooklyn
- Gemma-Leah Devereux - Get Up and Go
- Olwen Fouéré - The Survivalist
- Siobhan O'Kelly - An Klondike
- Ger Ryan - The Callback Queen

George Morrison Feature Documentary

- A Doctor's Sword - Bob Jackson and Gary Lennon
- The Land of the Enlightened - Morgan Bushe and Bart Van Langendonck
- Mom and Me - Ken Wardrop
- Older Than Ireland - Alex Fegan, Garry Walsh and Colm Nicell
- The Queen of Ireland - Ailish Bracken, Katie Holly and Conor Horgan

Short Film

- Change in the Weather
- Ernestine and Kit
- The Great Wide Open
- How Was Your Day?
- Love is a Sting
- Stutterer

Animation

- A Coat Made Dark - Jack O'Shea
- Geist - Daniel Spencer
- Tea with the Dead - Susan Broe
- Unhinged - Tom Caulfield

=== International categories ===
International Film sponsored by American Airlines

- The Revenant
- Spotlight
- Mad Max: Fury Road
- Ex Machina

International Actor

- Matt Damon - The Martian
- Leonardo DiCaprio - The Revenant
- Jacob Tremblay - Room
- Bryan Cranston - Trumbo

International Actress

- Brie Larson - Room
- Cate Blanchett -Carol
- Rachel Griffiths - Mammal
- Charlotte Rampling - 45 Years

=== Television Drama categories ===
Best Drama

- An Klondike
- Game of Thrones
- Penny Dreadful
- Rebellion
- Vikings

Director Drama

- Anthony Byrne - Ripper Street
- Neasa Hardiman - Happy Valley
- Daithí Keane - An Klondike
- Brian Kirk - Penny Dreadful
- Aisling Walsh - An Inspector Calls

Script Drama

- Marcus Fleming - An Klondike
- Lisa McGee - Indian Summers
- Billy Roche - Clean Break
- Colin Teevan - Rebellion

Actor in a Lead Role in Drama

- Barry Ward - Rebellion
- Dara Devaney - An Klondike
- Colin Farrell - True Detective
- Aidan Turner - Poldark
- Stephen Rea - Dickensian

Actress in a Lead Role Drama

- Caitriona Balfe - Outlander
- Ruth Bradley - Rebellion
- Elaine Cassidy - No Offence
- Sarah Greene - Rebellion
- Catherine Walker - Critical

Actor in a Supporting Role in Drama

- Ned Dennehy - Dickensian
- Liam Cunningham - Game of Thrones
- Moe Dunford - Vikings
- Robert O'Mahoney - An Klondike
- Stephen Rea - War and Peace

Actress in a Supporting Role in Drama

- Michelle Fairley - Rebellion
- Sarah Greene - Penny Dreadful
- Paula Malcomson - Ray Donovan
- Ruth Negga - Agents of S.H.I.E.L.D.
- Victoria Smurfit - Once Upon a Time

== Special awards ==
=== Rising Star Award ===
- Stephen Fingleton (Director/Writer — Magpie, The Survivalist)
  - Rebecca Daly (Director/Writer — Mammal, The Other Side of Sleep)
  - Alex Fegan (Documentarian — The Irish Pub, Man Made Men, Older Than Ireland)
  - Barry Ward (Actor — The Fall, Jimmy's Hall, Pursuit, Rebellion, The Truth Commissioner)

=== Lifetime Achievement ===
IFTA Outstanding Contribution to Cinema Award

- Liam Neeson

Irish Diaspora Award

- Roma Downey
