= Francis Magee =

Irish-Manx actor (born 1959)

- Born: 7 June 1959 (age 67); Dublin, Ireland
- Occupation: Actor
- Years active: 1993–present

Francis Magee (born 7 June 1959) is an Irish actor. He portrayed Liam Tyler in British soap opera EastEnders from 1993 to 1995. He has also appeared in numerous television shows and feature films, including The Calling (2000); Layer Cake (2004); Sahara (2005); No Angels (2004–2006); City of Vice (2008); 1066 The Battle for Middle Earth (2009); "Men Against Fire", an episode of Black Mirror (2016); Into the Badlands and Absentia (both 2019); White Lines (2020); and Kin (2022–2023).

== Early life ==
Born in Dublin, Ireland, and raised on the Isle of Man, Magee worked as a fisherman for eight years, before pursuing a career as an actor. Magee worked as a courier for Concord(e) Despatch in Belsize Park, and enrolled to study acting at the Poor School in King's Cross, London. During the 1980s, he was the lead singer of Isle of Man-based band Joe Public and Reading-based band Jo Jo Namoza.

== Career ==
His career started by portraying the villain character Liam Tyler in British soap opera EastEnders from 1993 to 1995. He played the role of Victor Rodenmaar in the Nickelodeon TV series House of Anubis. In 2004, he played a regular role as short tempered Leslie McManus in Channel 4's nurse drama No Angels, for three seasons until 2006. In 2008, he played Saunders Welch in City of Vice.

In 2011, Magee played Yoren, a member of the Night's Watch, in the first and second seasons of Game of Thrones on HBO. He played electronic musician The Orgazoid in an episode of Peep Show. He also appeared in the 2013 Magners television advert "Now is a Good Time".

In 2016, he appeared in "Men Against Fire", an episode of the anthology series Black Mirror.

In 2023, he played Bren Kinsella in the Irish gangster family series Kin, alongside Aidan Gillen and Maria Doyle Kennedy.

== Filmography ==
=== Film roles ===
Year	Film	Role	Notes
1995	The Hurting	Wease	
1998	Still Crazy	Hockney	
1998	Written in Blood	Dr. McRayer	
2000	The Calling	Carmac	
2000	Undertaker's Paradise		
2002	Butterfly Man	Joey	
2003	I'll Sleep When I'm Dead	Algar / Foreman	
2004	Layer Cake	Paul "The Boatman"	
2005	Sahara	Fuse Cutter	
2008	The Crew	Dermot	
2009	The Last Breath	Paul Kelvin	Short film
2009	London River	Inspecteur anglais	
2009	Perrier's Bounty	Hank	
2010	Cemetery Junction	Mr. Pearson	
2010	Brighton Rock	Pavement Photographer	
2011	If You Have No Place to Cry	Luis	Short film
2013	Hammer of the Gods	Ulric The Chronicler	
2014	Jimmy's Hall	Mossie	
2014	Glory Days	Jake Murphy	
2014	Good People	Ben Tuttrle	
2014	Blood Cells	Cormac	
2014	Locust	Alan Dwyer	Short film
2016	Rogue One: A Star Wars Story	Jav Mefran	
2017	The Last Lighthouse Keeper	Tom	Short film
2017	Take the Shot	Don	Short film
2017	Justice League	Ancient King of Men	
2017	Bless Me Father	Michael	Short film
2018	The Dig	Murphy	
2018	I Made This for You	Dad	
2018	Winterlong	Francis	
2019	Beasts	Arthur	Short film
2019	Extinction		Short film
2020	Pedro	Comandante Talbot	
2021	Zack Snyder's Justice League	Ancient King of Men	
2021	The Tide	Skipper	Short film
2021	As A Prelude to Fear	DCS Barnbrook	
2021	My House	Don	
2024	The Damned	Skuli	
2025	Rose of Nevada	Murgey	
2026	Wrath of the Gods	Tulloch	

=== TV roles ===
Year	Title	Role	Notes
1993–1995	EastEnders	Liam Tyler	19 episodes
1994	99-1	Balaclava	Episode: "The Cost of Living"
1994	Time After Time	Villain	Episode: "Working with Conviction"
1994	Moving Story	Scurve	Episode: "Last Stand at Laurel Way"
1996	A Touch of Frost	Rod Bainbridge	Episode: "Deep Waters"
1996–2005	Heartbeat	Ken Rawson / Stannard	2 episodes
1997	Where the Heart Is	Joe Bevan	Episodes: "Things Fall Apart"
1997	Drover's Gold	Irish	
1997	Painted Lady	Driver	
1997–2008	The Bill	David Crossley / Leo Durkin / Peter Lewis / Arty Shanks / Rod Tiernan / Clive Newton	6 episodes
1998–2014	Casualty	Frankie Lee / Jake Lincoln / Gavin /Tony Norris	5 episodes
1999	All the King's Men	Able Seaman	TV film
2000	Britannic	Reilly	TV film
2000	The Mrs Bradley Mysteries	Castries	Episode: "The Rising of the Moon"
2000	Don Quixote	Ginesillo de Parapilla	TV film
2000	The Knock	Davis	Episode: 5.1
2000–2011	Doctors	DI Lorenzo Morris / Ken Middlemiss / Arnie Lynch / Bobby Jones	
2001	Cold Feet	Daz	Episode: 4.2
2001	In a Land of Plenty	Trevor Michaels	Episode: 1.1
2001	The Bombmaker	O'Keefe	TV film
2001–2008	Holby City	Barry Carter / Barry Hughes	2 episodes
2002	Stranded	Pickles	TV film
2002	Ultimate Force	Lofty	Episode: "The Killing House"
2002	Lenny Blue	Connor	TV film
2003	Buried	Felix 'Ronaldo' Carver	2 episodes
2003	Footballers' Wives	DC Simmonds	Episode: 2.3
2003	Down to Earth	Davey	Episode: "All Together Now"
2003	In Deep	Ronnie Sharkey	2 episodes
2003	Born and Bred	James Falkner	Episode: "The Miracle of Ormston"
2003	Alibi	Sgt. Powell	TV film
2003	Family	Pat Bishop	2 episodes
2003	Holy Cross	Flag Man	TV film
2004	Bad Girls	Rob Skelton	3 episodes
2004	Shadow Play	Mr. Trimby	2 episodes
2004	Hustle	Journalist	Episode: "The Last Gamble"
2004	The Royal	Alex Heath	Episode: "No Room for Ravers"
2004–2006	No Angels	Mr. Leslie McManus	24 episodes
2005	Trafalgar Battle Surgeon	Dr. William Beatty	TV film
2005	Waking the Dead	Gordon Christie	Episode: "Subterraneans: Part 1"
2005	The Slavery Business	Captain Rollins	Episode: "How to Make a Million from Slavery"
2006	Murphy's Law	Detective Chief Superintendent Warren	3 episodes
2006	A Harlot's Progress	James Dalton	TV film
2006	Pulling	Eileen's Bloke	Episode: 1.6
2006–2007	New Street Law	Frank Halcroft	5 episodes
2007	Peep Show	The Orgazoid	Episode: "Handyman"
2007	Gina's Laughing Gear	Trevor Mullet	Episode: "Trevor Island"
2008	Survivors	Callum Brown	Episode: 1.1
2008	City of Vice	Saunders Welch	5 episodes
2008	Honest	Quentin	2 episodes
2009	1066 The Battle for Middle Earth	Ordgar	2 episodes
2009	True Horror	Vlad the Impaler / Scribe	2 episodes
2010	Worried About the Boy	Jerry O'Dowd	TV film
2010	Inspector George Gently	Chief Constable Lilley	Episode: "Peace and Love"
2011	Zen	Giulio / Avel Vasko	Episode: "Vendetta"
2011	Midsomer Murders	Smudgepot	Episode: "The Night of the Stag"
2011	The Body Farm	Barney Quinn	Episode: 1.6
2011	The Fades	Dr. Tremlett	5 episodes
2011–2012	Game of Thrones	Yoren	7 episodes
2011–2013	House of Anubis	Victor Rodenmaar Jr.	144 episodes
2012	Misfits	Dan Woolaston	
2012	DCI Banks	Arthur Jameson	2 episodes
2013	Touchstone of Ra	Victor Rodenmaar Jr.	TV special
2013	The Bible	King Saul	2 episodes
2013	Strike Back	O'Riordan	Episode: "Shadow Warfare: Part 5"
2014	Damo and Ivor	Bricko	
2014	WPC 56	Brendan McCormack	Episode: "Cry, Cry, Cry"
2014	In The Flesh	Iain Monroe	2 episodes
2014	Ripper Street	Davies	Episode: "Whitechapel Terminus"
2015	A.D. The Bible Continues	Levi	6 episodes
2015	Death in Paradise	Stevie Smith	Episode: "Swimming in Murder"
2015	Outlander	Crenshaw	2 episodes
2015	X Company	Thierry	Episode: "Kiss of Death"
2015	No Offence	Shane Mercy	Episode: 1.6
2015	Casanova	Balbi	TV film
2015	The Bastard Executioner	Absolon	5 episodes
2016	Black Mirror	Parn Heidekker	Episode: "Men Against Fire"
2016	The Coroner	George James	Episode: "The Foxby Affair"
2016	Of Kings and Prophets	Lahmi	Episode: "Lest I Sleep the Sleep of Death"
2016	The Musketeers	Hubert	Episode: "The Hunger"
2017	The Frankenstein Chronicles	Spence	Season 2; 3 episodes
2017	Loaded	Rocky	Episode: "Leon's Teacher"
2017–2018	Witless	Willy Whelan	9 episodes
2017–2019	GameFace	Marcella's Dad	2 episodes
2018	Humans	Tex	Episode: 3.6
2018	Death and Nightingales	Mickey Dolphin	3 episodes
2019	The Witcher	Yurga	Episode: "Much More"
2019	Into the Badlands	Magnus	4 episodes
2019	Absentia	Lester Nowicki	3 episodes
2019	Brassic	Big Joe Blane	Episode: 1.3
2019	Britannia	Rork	3 episodes
2020	White Lines	Clint Collins	9 episodes
2022–2023	Kin	Bren Kinsella	9 episodes
2024	The Tourist	Frank McDonnell	Main role (series 2)

=== Video games ===
Year	Title	Voice Role	Notes
2015	Bloodborne: The Old Hunters	Befuddled Villager / Nightmare Hunters	
2016	Dragon Quest Heroes II	Torneko	English version
2018	Sea of Thieves	Stitcher Jim	
2022	Dying Light 2	Cillian	English version
2023	Dragon Quest Monsters: The Dark Prince	Torneko	English version
