= Stuart Griffiths (photographer) =

British photographer and writer

Stuart Griffiths (born 1972) is a British photographer and writer living in Hastings, East Sussex. He published photographs from his time in the Parachute Regiment in The Myth of the Airborne Warrior (2011) and wrote about that period and later in Pigs' Disco (2013). Griffiths has had a solo exhibition, Closer, at MAC, Birmingham and his work is held in the collection of the Imperial War Museums.

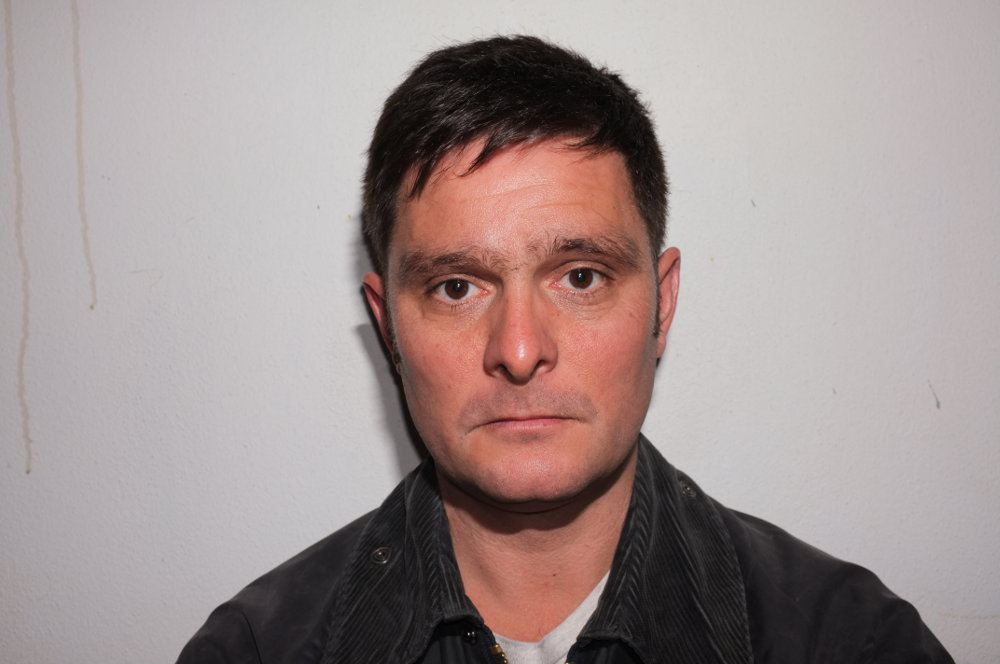
Griffiths in 2014

== Life and work ==
Griffiths is from North West England. He was born in Manchester and grew up on its outskirts. The family later moved to Warrington where he spent his teenage years.

He joined the British Army at age 16, spending five years in the Parachute Regiment, deployed as part of Operation Banner in Northern Ireland. He left in 1993, aged 21 and moved to Brighton, East Sussex. In 1993/94 he attended outdoor illegal rave / free parties around Brighton, which he photographed. From 1994 he studied for a BA in Editorial Photography at the University of Brighton, graduating in 1997. In 2000, Griffiths was homeless and jobless in London, sleeping in doorways until moving into an ex-forces hostel in east London. While living at the hostel he worked as a paparazzi photographer.

In the late 2000s, Griffiths worked on stories about gangs in Liverpool, first with Graham Johnson and later with other journalists.

The 2009 documentary film Isolation, directed by Luke Seomore and Joseph Bull, follows Griffiths as he journeys through England encountering ex-soldiers experiencing the physical and emotional scars of life after the Army. The film premiered at the Edinburgh Film Festival then toured the UK at Picturehouse Cinemas.

The photographs of The Myth of the Airborne Warrior (2011) "were taken on a compact Canon secreted in his webbing while he was serving as a paratrooper with the British Army in Northern Ireland in the late Eighties and early Nineties." Sean O'Hagan, in The Guardian, wrote that "The photographs ... often look snatched or have been taken from a distance so that the housing estates and streets of tribally divided, working-class Belfast look even bleaker and more threatening than they are. He captures his fellow paras at rest and at play ... The small book has little context save for Griffiths's own first-person text, which has been heavily edited in black marker to highlight the most shocking anecdotes in direct contrast with the mundanity of the images. ... An odd little book, then, of one soldier's wilfully unprofessional but curiously revealing photographs – but an evocative one for that very reason."

Pigs' Disco (2013) contains writing with accompanying photographs and illustrations. It "juxtaposes the grim and gritty reality of life as a British soldier stationed in Northern Ireland during the Troubles with images of the nascent rave scene and drug use in the British Army", as well as of later life in Brighton.

He currently lives in Hastings, East Sussex and works full-time with East Sussex Veterans Hub, dealing with veterans' alcohol and substance misuse issues.

== Publications ==
=== Books by Griffiths ===
- The Myth of the Airborne Warrior. Brighton and Hove: Photoworks, 2011. Photographs and text by Griffiths, and ephemera. Edited and with a short essay by Gordon MacDonald. ISBN 978-1-903796-45-0. Edition of 500 copies.
- Pigs' Disco. London: Ditto, 2013. Text, photographs and illustrations by Griffiths. ISBN 978-0-9567952-5-0.

=== Books with contributions by Griffiths ===
- Basics Creative Photography No. 2: Context and Narrative. By Maria Short. AVA Academia, 2011. ISBN 9782940411405.
- Fieldstudy 18: Closer. London: Photography and the Archive Research Centre, 2013. Edited Val Williams.
- Northern Ireland 30 Years of Photography. By Colin Graham. Belfast: Belfast Exposed; Metropolitan Arts Centre, 2013. ISBN 978-0-9561766-1-5. Published on the occasion of an exhibition.
- Portraits of Violence: War and the Aesthetics of Disfigurement. Corporealities: Discourses Of Disability. By Suzannah Biernoff. University of Michigan Press, 2017. ISBN 978-0472130290.
- Seaside Photographed. Thames & Hudson, 2019. By Val Williams and Karen Shepherdson. ISBN 9780500022061. Published on the occasion of an exhibition.
- Masculinities, Liberation Through Photography. London: Prestel, 2020. Edited by Alona Pardo. ISBN 9783791359519. Published on the occasion of an exhibition.

== Film and television documentary appearances ==
- Isolation (2009) – 76 mins, directed by Luke Seomore and Joseph Bull
- "Broken Covenant", People & Power series (Al Jazeera English, 2009) – 30 mins

== Exhibitions ==
=== Solo exhibitions ===
- Closer, London College of Communication, London, 2013; MAC, Birmingham, 2013; Sussex Coast College, Hastings, 2014. Curated by Val Williams.

=== Group exhibitions ===
- Seaside: Photographed, Turner Contemporary, Margate, 2019; John Hansard Gallery, University of Southampton, Southampton, 2020; Newlyn Art Gallery, Penzance, 2021. Curated by Val Williams and Karen Shepherdson. Included Griffiths' photographs of the 1990 rave scene in Brighton.

== Collections ==
Griffiths' work is held in the following permanent collection:

- Imperial War Museums, UK: 42 prints (as of May 2021)
