= April Brooks =

April Brooks may refer to:

- April Brooks (born 1987), real name of American professional wrestler AJ Lee
- April Brooks, fictional character in the British television series Emmerdale
