= Really Gone =

Really Gone may refer to:

- "Really Gone", a 2005 single by Ultan Conlon
- "Really Gone", a 2018 song by Chvrches from Love Is Dead
