= City of Vice =

2008 British historical crime drama television series set in Georgian London

- Genre: Crime drama
- Written by: Clive Bradley; Peter Harness
- Starring: Ian McDiarmid; Iain Glen
- Country of origin: United Kingdom
- Original language: English
- No. of series: 1
- No. of episodes: 5

Production
- Running time: 60 minutes (inc. adverts)
- Production companies: Touchpaper Television and Hardy & Sons

Original release
- Network: Channel 4
- Release: 14 January – 11 February 2008

City of Vice is a British historical crime drama television series set in Georgian London and first screened on 14 January 2008 on Channel 4.

== Premise ==
The series mixes fiction with fact following the fortunes of the famous novelist Henry Fielding (Ian McDiarmid) and his brother John (Iain Glen). Henry and John Fielding were magistrates of Westminster and the men who created the modern police force in Britain through the Bow Street Runners. The series was written by Clive Bradley and Peter Harness, whose scripts were nominated for a Writers' Guild of Great Britain Award for Best Series, 2008. It was directed by Justin Hardy and Dan Reed. The historical consultant was Hallie Rubenhold.

== Other information ==
The show uses authentic historical research to tell the story of the two men battling to create a police force, 75 years before Robert Peel founded the Metropolitan Police. Henry Fielding's memoirs and contemporary sources such as the Old Bailey Sessions Papers have been used to provide historical accuracy to the series, whilst other historical figures such as the Duke of Newcastle (Sam Spruell) and the Fieldings' collaborator Saunders Welch (Francis Magee) appear as characters.

The series uses innovative mapping sequences to follow the narrative and characters' progress, wherein John Rocque's map of 1746 is seen from above, becomes firstly 3D and ultimately merges with film sequences of the next scene to pick up the narrative tale.

The series won the Royal Television Society Judges' Award, 2008.

== Episodes ==
Episode One

(Written by Peter Harness. Directed by Justin Hardy.) The Fielding brothers investigate an attempted murder of a prostitute found raped and horrifically mutilated in a bagnio. The episode references Harris's List of Covent Garden Ladies.

Episode Two

(Written by Clive Bradley. Directed by Dan Reed.) The Reverend Erasmus Cavendish is found murdered and the evidence leads to an infamous Molly house on Saffron Hill, a brothel and rendezvous for London's gay men, where William Flynn is named as the prime suspect. It also turns out that Mr. Daniel Carne, one of the Bow Street Runners, is a closet homosexual and sodomite (at the time a crime punishable by death). Mr. Carne must choose between sin (and living a life with his secret homosexual lover) and redemption. Mr. Carne is eventually discovered to be with his lover who also turns out to be the Reverend's killer. Daniel is summarily relieved of his duties as one of the Bow Street Runners. Tom is found guilty and hanged. The episode references Macaroni (fashion).

Episode Three

(Written by Peter Harness. Directed by Dan Reed.) The Bow Street Runners investigate a burglary in Mayfair, the search leading to the shanty towns of Covent Garden, known as the Seven Dials, and a gang of Irish immigrant criminals.

Episode Four

(Written by Clive Bradley. Directed by Justin Hardy.) The gang leader, ironically named Tom Jones, is broken out of jail by his Irish gang, who shoot several prison guards in the process. The Bow Street Runners then travel to the Seven Dials to re-arrest Jones. Henry Fielding accompanies them to make sure Jones is apprehended, but is taken hostage by the gang. The Runners must decide if they're prepared to make a deal with the criminal elements of London to ensure his release. We also learn of how John Fielding, the Magistrate's half-brother became blind ("his sight was poor, but a quack's remedy blinded him.")

Episode Five

(Written by Clive Bradley. Directed by Justin Hardy.) Henry's narrative returns to the situation before the creation of the Runners. While lobbying the Duke of Newcastle to obtain his support for the venture, Henry investigates a secretive trade in child prostitutes. The UK DVD release of the series has this as the first episode.

== Reception ==
City of Vice launched with 2.7 million viewers and an 11% share in the 9 p.m. hour on Channel 4. The first episode of City of Vice was relatively well received in the British press, The Times describing it as "an antidote to the current spate of twee costume dramas" and "more likely to resonate with cynical modern audiences". The Guardian described it as looking "gravelled for cash" but compensating with "documentary direction and Ian McDiarmid's voice, as rich as a liqueur."

== DVD release ==
Contender Entertainment Group released the complete series on DVD in Region 2 (UK) on 18 February 2008. This release has been discontinued and is now out of print.

Entertainment One released the complete series on DVD in Region 1 on 10 June 2008.

== Bow Street Runner – the game ==
Bow Street Runner was an online game in five parts to accompany the series. Like the television series the game attempts to be historically accurate. The player takes control of a "Bow Street Runner" and has to solve several crimes by collecting clues, consulting witnesses and visiting several places in Georgian London. Each character is played by an actor (e.g. John Fielding is played by Julian Glover). The game itself is accompanied by several minigames which simulate various activities like picking locks or shooting. The game was produced by Brighton-based company Littleloud, and won a BAFTA in November 2008.
