= Leo Regan =

Irish filmmaker

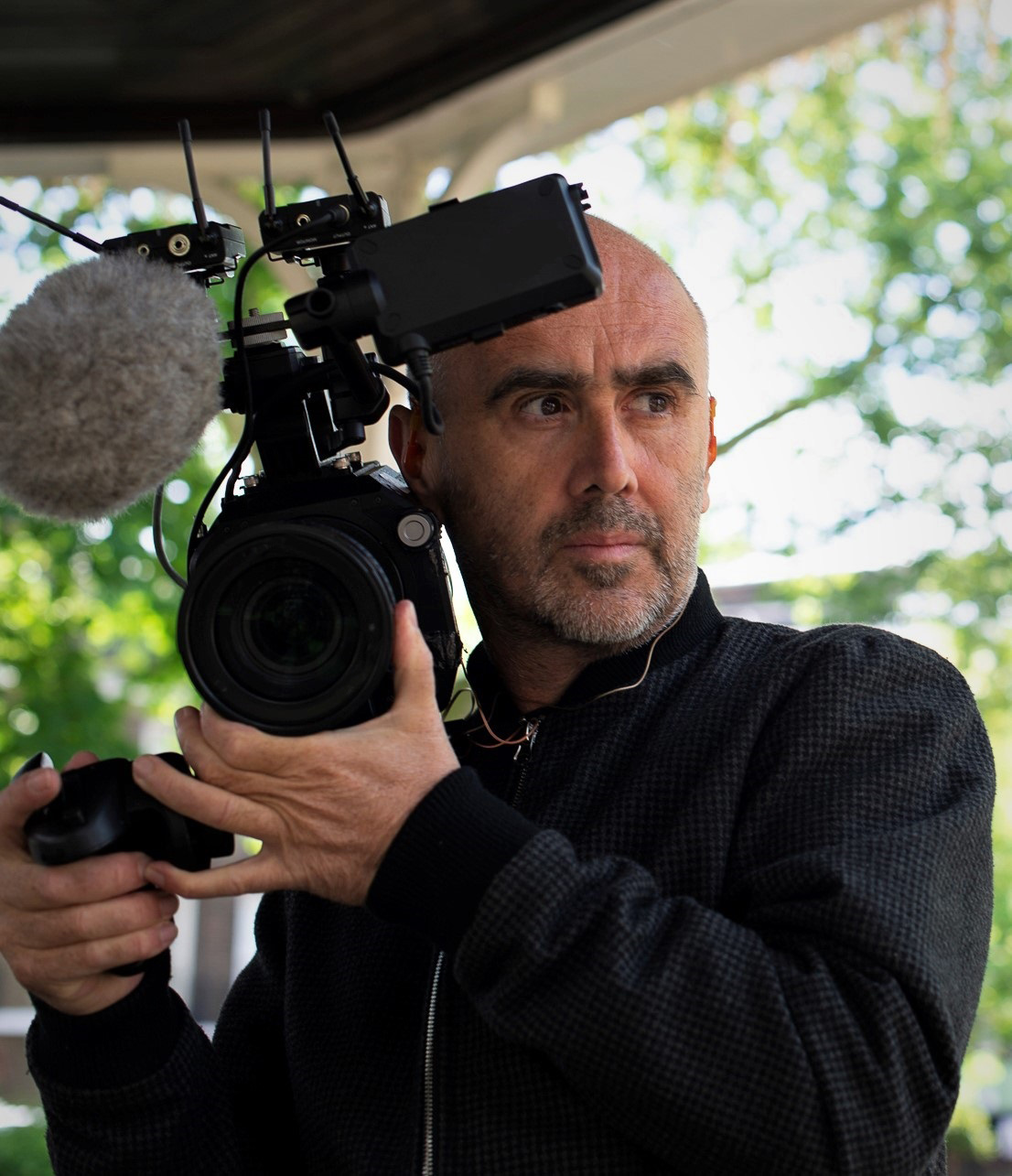
- Occupation: Filmmaker
- Awards: Director's Guild Outstanding Directorial Achievement 2005, BAFTA Flaherty Documentary Award 2001

Leo Regan is an Irish filmmaker and author. Initially working as a photojournalist, Regan began his career with the book Public Enemies (1993). He later became involved in documentary filmmaking, and in 2001 won a BAFTA for his documentary 100% White.

== Early life and career ==
Regan was born in 1963, and grew up in Dublin, Ireland.

He began his career as a photo journalist with the book Public Enemies, which explores the lives of British far-right skinheads in the 1990s.

In 2001, Regan turned his attention to documentary film making and won the BAFTA Flaherty Documentary Award at the (2001) 54th British Academy Film Awards for his documentary 100% White. A 2002 review in Modern Times credited Regan's "single crew films" as going "back to observational basics – a good lesson in the current British climate of gimmicky constructed documentaries".

In 2005, he received an award from the Directors Guild of Great Britain for his TV drama Comfortably Numb.

In 2023, Regan released the last of a trilogy of films on his friend and collaborator Lanre Fehintola. The independent feature documentary "My Friend Lanre" premiered at Sheffield Docfest in 2023, and was later screened at Curzon Cinema, Cork Film Festival, and Docs Ireland (2024)

== Filmography ==
- My Friend Lanre(2023)
- A Very Dangerous Doctor (2011)
- The Doctor Who Hears Voices (2008)
- Scars (2006)
- Comfortably Numb (2004)
- Battlecentre (2001)
- Cold Turkey (2001)
- 100 Per Cent White (2000)
- Don't Get High on Your Own Supply (1998)

== Books ==
- Public Enemies (1993)
- Taken Down In Evidence: Ireland From the Back of a Police Car (1995)
