= Jimmy's Hall =

2014 film by Ken Loach

- Film poster
- Directed by: Ken Loach
- Screenplay by: Paul Laverty
- Produced by: Rebecca O'Brien
- Starring: Barry Ward; Simone Kirby; Jim Norton; Francis Magee; Aisling Franciosi; Andrew Scott; Brían F. O'Byrne
- Cinematography: Robbie Ryan
- Edited by: Jonathan Morris
- Music by: George Fenton
- Production companies: Sixteen Films; Element Pictures; Why Not Productions; Wild Bunch; Film4
- Distributed by: Entertainment One (United Kingdom and Ireland); Le Pacte (France)
- Release dates: 22 May 2014 (Cannes); 30 May 2014 (United Kingdom)
- Running time: 106 minutes
- Countries: United Kingdom; Ireland; France
- Language: English

Jimmy's Hall is a 2014 drama film directed by Ken Loach. The film tells the story of the deportation to the United States in 1933 of Irish Communist Jimmy Gralton, who led the Revolutionary Workers' Group, a precursor of the Communist Party of Ireland, in County Leitrim. It stars Irish actor Barry Ward, along with Simone Kirby, Jim Norton and Denise Gough. The title refers to a rural dance hall built by Gralton in his home town Effrinagh.

It was selected to compete for the Palme d'Or in the main competition section at the 2014 Cannes Film Festival.

== Plot ==
In 1932, after ten years of living in the United States, Jimmy Gralton returns to his home in native Ireland to help his mother run the family farm.

A new government is in power ten years after the end of the Irish Civil War, an act which leads to Jimmy reestablishing a community centre for young people to dance, study or talk, drawing on his experience with jazz music during his time in the US. The hall becomes popular, which arouses opposition in the town, particularly the Church in the form of Father Sheridan, who denounces the music and dancing at the hall as lewd and licentious.

Jimmy and his mother, with whom he is living and who is also sympathetic to Communism, attempt to prevent an eviction of a family who are displaced from their home. Jimmy's activism brings him to the attention of the Gardaí. This starts a chain of events which ends in Jimmy's deportation from Ireland for sedition. As he holds an American passport, he is exiled back to States. During a rally protesting his expulsion, Jimmy's mother decries the lack of a fair trial. Gralton was the first and only Irish person in history to ever be deported from Ireland.

== Critical response ==
Jimmy's Hall garnered generally positive critical reception. Review aggregation website Rotten Tomatoes gives the film a score of 76% from 104 reviews. The site's consensus states: "Benefiting from a talented cast and sensitive work from director Ken Loach, Jimmy's Hall offers period drama rich with relevant sociopolitical themes." Metacritic gave the film a weighted average score of 63 out of 100, based on reviews from 24 critics, indicating "generally favorable reviews".

Scott Foundas of Variety called it: "A minor-key but eminently enjoyable work by a master craftsman."

== Musical ==
In 2017, Dublin′s Abbey Theatre presented a musical adaptation of the film. It returned to the Abbey in 2018 and toured nationwide.
