= Taken Down =

Irish soap opera

- Genre: Crime drama
- Country of origin: Ireland
- Original language: English
- No. of series: 1

Production
- Running time: 50 minutes (excluding ad breaks)
- Production company: Raidió Teilifís Éireann

Original release
- Network: RTÉ One
- Release: 4 November 2018

Taken Down, is an Irish crime drama series starring Aissa Maiga, Lynn Rafferty, Brian Gleeson, Orla Fitzgerald and Barry Ward. It ran for one season on RTÉ2.

The series follows Inspector Jen Rooney (Lynn Rafferty) and her team investigating the refugee community after a Nigerian girl is killed.

== Reception ==
The Irish Times called the series a "solemn drama".
