= Restless (2024 film) =

- UK theatrical release poster
- Directed by: Jed Hart
- Written by: Jed Hart
- Produced by: Benedict Turnbull; Iain Simpson; Jens Nielsen; Sophie Ede; Harri Kamalanathan
- Starring: Lyndsey Marshal; Aston McAuley; Barry Ward; Kate Robbins; Denzel Baidoo; Ciara Ford
- Cinematography: David Bird
- Edited by: Anna Meller
- Production companies: HAUS Pictures; Village Films
- Distributed by: Thunderbird Releasing
- Release dates: 9 June 2024 (Tribeca Film Festival); 4 April 2025 (United Kingdom)
- Running time: 89 minutes
- Country: United Kingdom
- Language: English
- Box office: $60,697

Restless is a 2024 British thriller dark comedy drama film directed and written by Jed Hart, in his feature directorial debut. The film premiered at the Tribeca Film Festival on 9 June 2024 and also played at Glasgow Film Festival 2025, where it was nominated for the Audience Award. Restless also played at Manchester Film Festival, where it won Best UK Feature Film, and Best Actress, won by Lyndsey Marshal. The film was released theatrically in the United Kingdom on 4 April 2025.

== Plot ==
A mild-mannered care worker's peaceful existence is disturbed when an intimidating party animal moves into the house next door, a property that her parents inhabited for decades before their recent passing. Subjected to endless sleepless nights, she is gradually drawn into an escalating war of attrition that will test her resolve and her sanity to the limit.

== Cast ==
- Lyndsey Marshal as Nicky
- Aston McAuley as Deano
- Barry Ward as Kev
- Kate Robbins as Jackie
- Denzel Baidoo as Clarkey
- Ciara Ford as Marley

== Release ==
Restless premiered at the Tribeca Film Festival on 9 June 2024. The film was released in the United Kingdom and Ireland on 4 April 2025. Quiver Distribution released the film on digital in the United States on 23 May 2025.

== Reception ==
On the review aggregator website Rotten Tomatoes, 94% of 35 critics' reviews are positive.
