= Philomena McDonagh =

- Occupation: Actress/writer
- Years active: 1979–2010

Philomena McDonagh (also known as Phylomena McDonagh) is an English actress and writer best known for her roles as art teacher June Summers in Grange Hill and Carol Nelson in ITV soap opera Emmerdale. McDonagh acted in Phil Young's play "Crystal Clear" at the Wyndham's Theatre in London, England with Anthony Allen and Diana Barrett in the cast. Phil Young was also director. She has also written films and for television, notably the film adaptation of Far from the Madding Crowd.

== Career ==
=== Acting ===
McDonagh first appeared in acting in 1975, in play for today, playing Nurse O'Malley. She was credited as Phylomena McDonagh. In 1979, she played June Summers the art teacher in the children's drama series Grange Hill. In the same year, she appeared in Angels as Sister Moran. In 1980, she appeared in a short sketch called The Errand. She also appeared in BBC2 Playhouse in Happy, as Barbara. She appeared on stage in 1983 in the female lead in Phil Young's play Chrystal Clear as Thomasina, a girl who has been blind since birth, and falls in love with Richard, a man whose relationship is failing with Jane, his current girlfriend. In 1987, she played her first of two appearances in The Bill, as Mrs. Bradford in "Domestics". She appeared again two years later as Janet Watson in "Woman In Brown". In 1991, McDonagh joined the cast of the ITV soap opera Emmerdale as Carol Nelson, a girl who Archie Brooks falls for and dates. They split up later. In 2010, after a seventeen-year break from acting, she appeared in Little Crackers.

=== Writing ===
McDonagh has written films and television. Her first work was the film adaptation of Chrystal Clear in 1988, which she had appeared in five years previously. Her next work was ten years later, the film adaptation of the novel Far from the Madding Crowd. In the same year, she wrote the film King's Girl. In 2005, she wrote an episode of Agatha Christie's Poirot.

== Filmography ==
=== Television ===
Year	Title	Role	Notes
1975	Play for Today	Nurse O'Malley	credited as "Phylomena McDonagh"
1979	Grange Hill	Miss June Summers	9 episodes
1979	Angels	Sister Moran	2 episodes
1980	The Errand	Girl	Short film
1980	BBC2 Playhouse	Barbara	
1981	The Dick Emery Show		
1981	World's End	Finnish Girl	2 episodes
1983	Don't Wait Up	Marie-Claire	
1984	Play for Today	Julia	Episode: "Talk To Me"
1986	Brookside	Jerry Martin	
1987	The Bill	Mrs Bradwell	
1988	Crystal Clear	Thomasina	TV movie
1989	The Bill	Janet Watson	
1991–1993	Emmerdale	Carol Nelson	191 episodes
2010	Little Crackers	Staff Member	

=== Film ===
Year	Title	Role
1983	Ascendancy	Mary
1984	Still Life	Linda
1984	The House	Maid
1989	Resurrected	Ileen Clausen
1992	The Dying of the Light	Maureen Deveruex

=== Theatre ===
Year	Title	Role
1983	Crystal Clear	Thomasina

== Writing Credits ==
Year	Title	Notes
1988	Crystal Clear	
1998	Far From The Madding Crowd	
1998	King Girl	
2002	Daddy's Girl	
2005	Agatha Christie's Poirot	1 Episode: After The Funeral
