= Sunburn (1999 film) =

- Film poster
- Directed by: Nelson Hume
- Written by: Nelson Hume; Mark Edgington
- Produced by: Jean Doumanian
- Starring: Cillian Murphy; Paloma Baeza; Barry Ward; Ingeborga Dapkunaite
- Release date: 1999
- Running time: 89 minutes
- Countries: United States; Ireland
- Language: English

Sunburn is a 1999 comedy-drama film directed by Nelson Hume and starring Cillian Murphy, Paloma Baeza, and Barry Ward. The film is about a group of young Irish people who spend the summer in the United States.

== Cast ==
- Cillian Murphy as Davin McDerby
- Paloma Baeza as Aideen Higgins
- Barry Ward as Robert Fiske
- Ingeborga Dapkunaite as Carolyn Kramer
- Sinead Keenan as Margaret
- Aidan Kelly as Raymond McDerby
- Michael Liebman as Billy Conlin

== Reception ==
The film has received positive reviews with Variety saying 'Nelson Hume's assured feature debut is spot-on in its portrayal of work-and-play summers of young students visiting the U.S.'.

== Plot ==
Davin, a young Irish man has gathered money for an abortion, when his girlfriend tells him she's not getting one, she's changed her mind, and she walks away. Elsewhere, a young high-strung man, Robert, stops at an arcade to say goodbye to his disinterested friends on his way to America. Davin is nearby and hears about the program for young Irish youth spending summer in America.

Davin packs for America and leaves on a bike. He encounters his younger brother while sneaking out the house who asks for his Adidas Predators, to which Davin agrees. He manages to get onto the bus, where a video informs about the jobs many Irish youth get during their summer at Long Island. Robert recognizes Davin on the bus, and talks about fishing being a well paying job. Davin teases Robert about not knowing much about fishing. They lie to a fisherman about having experience and they are hired.

A young woman with a large group of friends, Aideen gets a job as a dispatcher for a cab company.

Meanwhile, Davin realizes the fishing trip is two weeks, jumps off at the port, leaving Robert to deal on his own. While boxing at a club, a friend tells Davin about introducing a guy that can get around immigration, Billy. Distracted by Aideen, who arrived with the immigration guy, Davin gets punched. After the fight, Aideen and Davin have a conversation and she tells him she works with Billy. Davin recognizes her as the dispatcher, "queen of the airways". Davin meets Veronica, Aideen's roommate.

Billy tells Davin about his New York friends that can help him and asks what his family thinks of him not going back. Davin replies he doesn't care, and they joke about American beer.

On the boat, the fishermen tease Robert and send him off with worthless seaweed to sell. A woman, Carolyn offers to buy it as fertilizer. On the job, Aideen receives a call for Veronica, when there are no available drivers and Billy offers to go himself. On his way back, Robert finds his roommate is Davin, who expresses the importance of not telling anyone back home about him. Robert delivers the seaweed in a cab, and helps the woman add it to her garden.

At a party, Davin and Aideen have a drink together. Aideen knows he's not going back home and promises to keep his secret, she asks why. He tells her Ireland isn't for dreams or the "pursuit of happiness". He asks if she's slept with Billy and she laughingly tells him to fuck off. Davin introduces her to Robert, who Aideen knows as the one with the seaweed. He has gotten a job with the woman he sold the seaweed to. Aideen and the cab driver tease him about the woman and his potential crush.

At a bar, where Davin works as a bartender, he gets a call from Ireland, from the mother of his child, Margaret. At the same time, Billy gets him a list of people to call for immigration. Davin asks Robert for money to send to Margaret. Davin realizes his family already gave her money, and uses Robert's money to buy a car. Robert and Davin have an argument.

Aideen gets jealous about Billy and Veronica. She meets at Davin's bar and they have a drink. Carolyn and Robert grow closer. Aideen and Davin spend more time together. After a night out, Davin's roommates kick him out because he hasn't been paying rent. Aideen delivers a message to him from Davin's ex-girlfriend, and finds out about the baby. Everyone celebrates Robert's birthday at Carolyn's house, unfortunately she returns in time to see the party being held without her permission. They are kicked out and Robert is hurt by the breaking of his relationship with Carolyn. Aideen blames Davin's lack of responsibility citing his immaturity about his baby.

With the end of the summer approaching, Davin returns Robert's money and apologizes. They go golfing and discuss Carolyn, Robert reveals his feelings for her. Davin offers to drive Robert to see Aideen at the airport. He meets at her place and tries to convince her to stay, while she tries to convince him to return to Ireland to make arrangements about his baby; although he tells her he intends to provide regular financial support, he refuses to go back. The car breaks down when Davin's driving them to the airport. Davin and Aideen kiss, and as Davin watches Aideen leave, he finally decides to go home, calling out, "I'm coming with you!" and begins running after her.
