= Far from the Madding Crowd (1998 film) =

- Written by: Thomas Hardy; Philomena McDonagh
- Directed by: Nicholas Renton
- Starring: Paloma Baeza; Nathaniel Parker; Jonathan Firth; Nigel Terry
- Music by: John Keane
- Country of origin: United Kingdom
- Original language: English
- No. of episodes: 4

Production
- Producer: Hilary Bevan Jones
- Running time: 56 minutes
- Production company: Granada Television

Original release
- Network: ITV
- Release: 6 July – 27 July 1998

Far from the Madding Crowd is a 1998 drama television film adaptation of Thomas Hardy's 1874 novel of the same name.

== Cast ==
- Nathaniel Parker as Gabriel Oak
- Jonathan Firth as Frank Troy
- Nigel Terry as Mr Boldwood
- Paloma Baeza as Bathsheba Everdene
- Natasha Little as Fanny Robin
- Sean Gilder as Joseph Poorgrass
- Linda Bassett as Maryann Money
- Robin Soans as Henery Fray
- Sarah Tansey as Soberness Miller
- Victoria Alcock as Temperance Miller
- Elizabeth Estensen as Mrs Coggan
- John Boswall as Timothy

== Critical reception ==
Will Joyner of The New York Times wrote a positive review of the adaptation: "Strangely, and to its great credit, this new Far From the Madding Crowd, which was produced by Granada Television in Britain and WGBH-TV in Boston, does not simply survive the viewer's tendency to compare and second-guess; it thrives upon it. At almost every turn of the deliciously gradual tale of romantic chaos, the new version is just as visually striking as the 1967 film -- some of the locations are virtually identical -- and is more naturally rendered dramatically, with a rough language truer to Hardy's blend of poetry and rural speech."
