= Isolation (2009 film) =

- Directed by: Luke Seomore; Joseph Bull
- Release date: June 2009
- Country: United Kingdom

Isolation is a documentary film by Luke Seomore and Joseph Bull completed in 2009.

== Summary ==
The atmospheric documentary centers around the life of Stuart Griffiths, an ex-Paratrooper, who has since become a renowned social photographer. He journeys through England encountering ex-soldiers, experiencing the physical and emotional scars of life after the Army.

The film premiered at the Edinburgh film festival in June 2009.
