= Paloma Baeza =

Mexican-British actress and director

- Born: 1 May 1975 (age 51); London, England, United Kingdom
- Occupations: Actress, director
- Years active: 1994–present
- Spouse: Alex Garland
- Children: 2

Paloma Baeza (born 1 May 1975) is a Mexican-British actress and director. Her 2017 film Poles Apart won the BAFTA Award for Best Short Animation in 2018.

== Biography ==
Baeza was born in London and spent her childhood in Mexico. Her Mexican father and her British mother were musicians who met in the UK. In 1975, when Baeza was five months old, her parents married in London and they moved to Mexico City. They divorced nine years later.

She returned to the UK with her mother in 1985, when she was nine. She began taking acting classes and appeared very early in the London theatres and British television productions. She studied English and Performing Arts at the University of Bristol.

Baeza has acted in a number of films and television programmes, including the 1998 film Far from the Madding Crowd playing the leading role of Bathsheba Everdene, and the 2008 BBC production The Passion as Mary Magdalene. She has also performed on stage, including Navy Pier in 2000 and The Flight Into Egypt in 1996.

Baeza directed a short feature film Watchmen in 2001, which she wrote with actor Cillian Murphy, who also starred. She directed the TV film The Window in 2006. Baeza decided to study animation at the National Film and Television School. For her graduation project, she made the stop-motion short film Poles Apart, which won the BAFTA Award for Best Short Animation in 2018. In 2018, she began directing a CG/live-action film, The Toymaker's Secret, written by her husband Alex Garland. She is also working on a project on the life of Frida Kahlo.

== Personal life ==
Baeza is married to novelist and filmmaker Alex Garland; they have a son and a daughter.

== Filmography ==
=== Film ===
Year	Title	Role	Notes	Ref(s)
1995	A Kid in King Arthur's Court	Princess Katey		
1997	The Longest Memory	Lydia	TV film	
1998	Far from the Madding Crowd	Bathsheba Everdene	TV film	
1999	Like Clockwork	Helen	Short film	
1999	Sunburn	Aideen Higgins		
2001	All Forgotten	Mashenka	Alternative title: "Lover's Prayer"	
2001	That Sinking Feeling	Girl	Short film	
2002	The Escapist	Valerie Hopkins		
2002	The Project	Irene Lloyd	TV film	
2006	Scars	Sophia	TV film	
2007	Sunshine	Capa's Sister		
2022	The House	N/A	Directorial debut; Segment: III - Listen again and seek the sun	

=== Television ===
Year	Title	Role	Notes
1994	Mud	Phillipa	Series regular, 6 episodes
1994	Screen Two	Paula	Episode: "Look Me in the Eye"
1995	Joseph	Dinah	Miniseries, 2 episodes
1996	No Bananas	Rose Grant	Series regular, 10 episodes
1996	The Tenant of Wildfell Hall	Rose Markham	Miniseries, 2 episodes
1997	The Odyssey	Melanthe	Miniseries, 2 episodes
1997	Bramwell	Emmaline O'Neill	Recurring role, 2 episodes
1998	The Vanishing Man	Helen Neath	Episode: "Spooks"
1998	The Magical World of Disney	Sandy	Episode: "A Knight in Camelot"
1999	A Touch of Frost	Rachel Darrow	Episode: "Private Lives"
2000	Anna Karenina	Kitty	Miniseries, 4 episodes
2001	Rebel Heart	Ita Feeney	Miniseries, 4 episodes
2001	Waking the Dead	Anna Maitland	Episode: "Every Breath You Take"
2001	The Way We Live Now	Hetta Carbury	Miniseries, 4 episodes
2008	The Passion	Mary Magdalene	Miniseries
2008	Spooks	Elizaveta Starkova	Recurring role, 3 episodes

== Directing credits ==
- Watchmen (short film, 2001)
- The Window (TV film, 2006)
- The Odds (short film, 2009)
- Poles Apart (short film, 2017)
- The House (Netflix film, 2022)*
- The Toymaker's Secret (TBA)

*Paloma Baeza only directed the third and last part of The House’s collection of short stories.

== Awards ==
- BAFTA Award for Best Short Animation – Poles Apart (2018)
