= Pursuit (2015 film) =

- Theatrical film poster
- Directed by: Paul Mercier
- Written by: Paul Mercier
- Produced by: Anne Gately
- Starring: Ruth Bradley; Barry Ward; Brendan Gleeson; Liam Cunningham
- Release date: 18 September 2015
- Running time: 95 minutes
- Country: Ireland
- Language: English

Pursuit is a 2015 Irish crime thriller film written and directed by Paul Mercier. The film stars Ruth Bradley, Barry Ward, Liam Cunningham and Brendan Gleeson among an ensemble cast of Irish actors.

== Plot ==
Pursuit is a modern-day gangland retelling of the ancient Irish legend of The Pursuit of Diarmuid and Gráinne. Gráinne is daughter of a major crime boss and is promised in marriage Fionn, one of his lieutenants, to help cement an alliance. However, she's in love with Fionn's bodyguard Diarmuid, and her actions set off a wild chase across the country.

== Cast ==
- Ruth Bradley as Gráinne
- Barry Ward as Diarmuid
- Brendan Gleeson as Searbhán
- Owen Roe as Mr. King
- Liam Cunningham as Fionn

== Release ==
Pursuit premiered at the 28th annual Galway Film Fleadh on July 10, 2015. It was screened for Irish President Michael D. Higgins on September 9, 2015. It went on general release in IMC Cinemas across Ireland on September 18, 2015.

Pursuit received its network premiere on TV3 on March 20, 2016.
