= Ruth Bradley =

Irish actress

- Born: Dublin, Ireland
- Occupation: Actress
- Years active: 1996–present

Ruth Bradley is an Irish actress. She is best known for playing Emily Merchant in Primeval (2011) and Karen Voss in Humans (2015–18). She has also had recurring roles in Legend (6 episodes, 2006), The Innocence Project (8 episodes, 2006–07), Plus One (6 episodes, 2009) and Love/Hate (seasons 1 and 2). Awards she has won include the IFTA Award for Best Supporting Actress in 2007, for her role in Stardust, and a Best Actress award at the Milan International Film Festival 2010 for her starring performance in the film In Her Skin. She is also known for playing Emma Flyte in Slow Horses (seasons 4-6).

== Early life and education ==
Ruth Bradley was born in Dublin, Ireland, to actress Charlotte Bradley. Bradley lived in Newfoundland, Canada from shortly after birth until she was five. She enrolled in Trinity College Dublin to study drama and languages, but dropped out after three weeks and moved to London to pursue acting full-time at the age of 18.

She is the older sister of actress Roisín Murphy.

== Career ==
Bradley voiced the pink Power Ranger in the Irish-language version of Power Rangers. Bradley's first screen appearances were in 2002 in Ultimate Force (as Georgia Gracey) and Sinners (as Angela).

She had recurring roles in The Clinic (3 episodes, 2003), Love Is the Drug (4 episodes, 2004), Legend (6 episodes, 2006), The Innocence Project (8 episodes, 2006–07), Plus One (6 episodes, 2009) and Love/Hate (seasons 1 and 2).

She presented at the 4th Irish Film and Television Awards in 2007. She won the IFTA Award for Best Supporting Actress in 2007 for Stardust. In 2009, Bradley starred in the film In Her Skin, the true story of an Australian teen who goes missing and is later found to have been murdered by her childhood friend (played by Bradley). Bradley won a Best Actress award at the Milan International Film Festival 2010 for her performance.

In late 2010, she filmed the female lead in the Irish monster movie Grabbers, which opened in August 2012 and later screened worldwide.

She had a recurring role as Emily Merchant in the fourth and fifth series of the ITV science fiction show Primeval.

She played companion Molly O'Sullivan in the Doctor Who audio drama Dark Eyes.

She appeared as DI Karen Voss in the Channel 4/AMC science fiction series Humans from 2015.

In autumn 2019, she played Angie in the dark and comic BBC series Guilt.

== Acting credits ==
Key
†	Denotes works that have not yet been released

=== Film ===
Year	Film	Role	Notes
2006	Flyboys	Laura	
2008	Alarm	Molly	
2009	In Her Skin	Caroline Reid Robertson	
2009	Love	Sal	Short
2012	Grabbers	Garda Lisa Nolan	
2013	The Sea	Claire	
2013	Breakfast Wine	Lady	Short
2015	Pursuit	Gráinne	
2016	Holidays	Elizabeth Cullen	Segment: "Saint Patrick's Day"
2016	The Flag	Charlie	
2017	Daphne	Tracey	
2019	The Informer	Cat	
2022	The Wonder	Maggie Ryan	
2023	Embers	Amy	

=== Television ===
Year	Title	Role	Notes
2002	Ultimate Force	Georgia Gracey	Episode: "The Killing of a One-Eyed Bookie"
2002	Sinners	Angela	TV film
2003	The Clinic	Moya Cassidy	3 episodes
2004	Love Is the Drug	Brenda	Recurring role
2005	The Golden Hour	Erin Cooper	1 episode
2005	Showbands	Maggie	TV film
2006	Legend	Jacinta	Recurring role
2006	Stardust	Antoinette Keegan	Mini-series
2006–2007	The Innocence Project	Beth McNair	Recurring role
2007	Comedy Showcase	Laura	Episode: "Plus One"
2009	Plus One	Laura	Recurring role
2009	Rásaí na Gaillimhe	Garda Aoife Ní Chaoimh	Recurring role
2010–2011	Love/Hate	Mary Treacy	Recurring role
2011	Primeval	Emily Merchant	Recurring role
2012	Titanic	Mary Maloney	Mini-series
2012	Threesome	Julie	Episode: "Alice's Friend"
2012	Beauty and the Beast: A Dark Tale	Grace	TV film
2013	Big Thunder		TV film
2013	Horizon	Laura	TV film
2015–2018	Humans	Karen Voss	Series regular
2016	Rebellion	Frances O'Flaherty	Mini-series
2016	The Fall	Wallace	5 episodes
2017	Electric Dreams	Yaro Peterson	Episode: "Human Is"
2018	The Split	Lauren Brooker	1 episode
2018	Agatha and the Truth of Murder	Agatha Christie	TV film
2019–2023	Guilt	Angie Curtis	Recurring role; 5 episodes
2021	Endeavour	Sarah Sellars	Episode: "Striker"
2021–2023	Ted Lasso	Ms. Bowen	Recurring role; 5 episodes
2023–2024	Concordia	Thea Ryan	Main role
2023	The Gold	Isabelle Cooper	Recurring role; 4 episodes
2024–2026	Slow Horses	Emma Flyte	

=== Stage ===
Year	Title	Role	Venue	Notes
1996	Buddleia	Daughter	Donmar Warehouse, Covent Garden, London	
2002	Sive	Sive	Olympia Theatre - Dublin, Glór Music Centre - Ennis, Cork Opera House - Cork & Town Hall Theatre - Galway	with Druid Theatre Company
2009	The Playboy of the Western World	Pegeen Mike	Abbey Theatre, Dublin	
2019	This Beautiful Village	Liz	Abbey Theatre, Dublin	

== Awards and nominations ==
Year	Award	Category	Work	Result	Ref.
2007	Irish Film and Television Awards	Best Actress in a Lead Role in Television	Legend	Nominated	
2007	Irish Film and Television Awards	Best Actress in a Supporting Role in Television	Stardust	Won	
2010	Irish Film and Television Awards	Best Actress in a Lead Role in Television	Rásaí na Gaillimhe	Nominated	
2011	Irish Film and Television Awards	Best Actress in a Lead Role in Film/Television	Love/Hate	Nominated	
2011	Milano International Film Festival Awards	Best Actress	In Her Skin	Won	
2013	Irish Film and Television Awards	Best Actress in Film	Grabbers	Won	
2016	Irish Film and Television Awards	Best Actress in a Lead Role - Film	Pursuit	Nominated	
2016	Irish Film and Television Awards	Best Actress in a Lead Role - Drama	Rebellion	Won	
2017	Irish Film and Television Awards	Best Actress in a Supporting Role - Drama	Humans	Nominated	
2020	Irish Film and Television Awards	Best Actress in a Supporting Role - Drama	Guilt	Nominated	
