= Luke Seomore =

British film director and musician

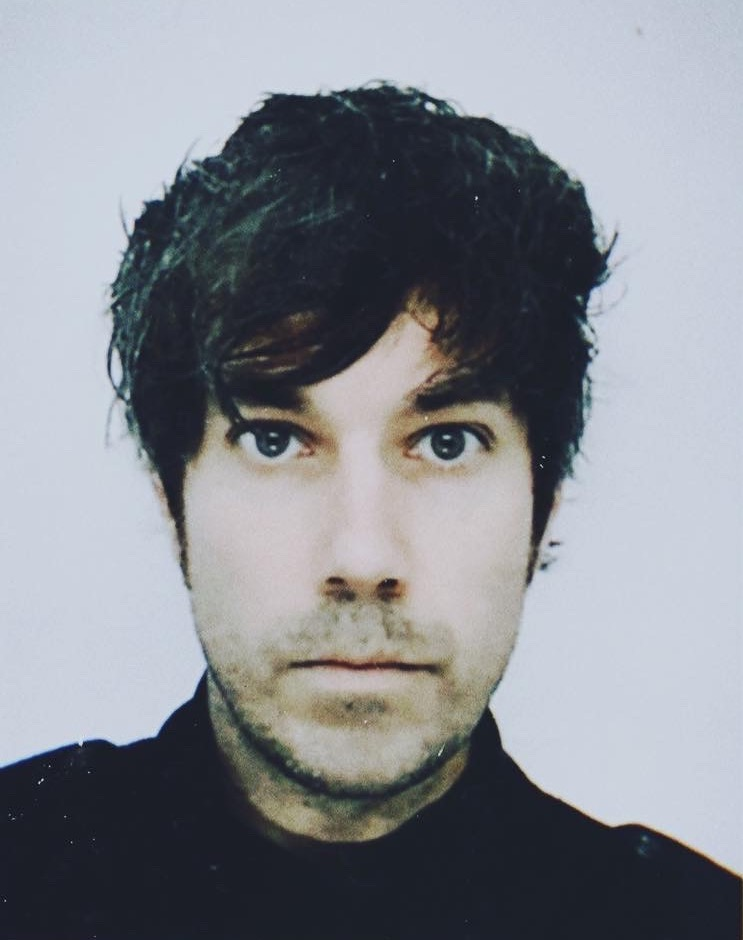
- Born: Essex, England
- Occupations: Film director, musician,
- Years active: 2005–present
- Website: blessedaretheheartsthatbend.bandcamp.com

Luke Seomore is an English film director, and musician, part of a critically acclaimed filmmaking duo working alongside English director Joseph Bull. He often performs and writes under the moniker ‘Blessed are the Hearts that Bend'. Seomore's work includes music videos, Feature films, television and art installations. They write and direct their films together, while Seomore composes original soundtracks. Their debut feature Blood Cells premiered at 71st Venice International Film Festival in 2014.

== Career ==
Their feature documentary Isolation premiered at Edinburgh International Film Festival in 2009. The film received numerous positive reviews, The Guardian wrote that Isolation was 'a beautifully attuned piece of work' while Sight and Sound wrote 'The film replicates this chaos by introducing a potent clash of poetry and magic realism in between the naturalistic interviews.' and Little White Lies proclaimed it was one of the three best British films at EIFF, describing the documentary had a 'visually stunning aesthetic that is absolutely riveting, a vital and important documentary that stays with you long after it has finished'.

The film also caught the attention of English film director Ken Loach, who described the film as 'important document of the experiences of ex-soldiers through the eyes of someone who knows.’ Dazed & Confused magazine commissioned a discussion between Seomore and Loach, to celebrate the release of Route Irish.

Seomore composed the film's entire score and a live soundtrack version of the film premiered at Branchange Film festival in Jersey. After Jersey the film backed by live score (additional musicians Michael Garrad and David Stephens) sold out two dates at The Roundhouse and one date at the Barbican.

In July 2010 Picturehouse Cinemas released Isolation nationwide. The film toured throughout the UK, a live score was performed at each screening by Seomore alongside musicians Michael Garrad and David Stephens.

== Music videos ==
The duo have produced numerous music videos and documentaries for such acts as, Four Tet, Steve Reid, Tricky (who described them as 'genius'), Liquid Liquid, Wild Beasts (shot in a blizzard, where Seomore contracted frostbite), Duffy, British Sea Power and The Last Shadow Puppets whom Alex Turner and Miles Kane hired to document the making of their album 'Age of the understatement'

== Filmography ==
- Lost & Found: Jim Lee (short) (2005)
- Isolation (2010)
- The First Dead Lies (short) (2012)
- Blood Cells (2015)

== Moving Image Art ==
- Forgotten Landscapes (2009) (Installation)
