= The Survivalist (2015 film) =

- Theatrical release poster
- Directed by: Stephen Fingleton
- Written by: Stephen Fingleton
- Produced by: David Gilbery; Wayne Marc Godfrey; Robert Jones
- Starring: Martin McCann; Mia Goth; Olwen Fouéré
- Cinematography: Damien Elliott
- Edited by: Mark Towns
- Production company: The Fyzz Facility
- Distributed by: Bulldog Film Distribution
- Release dates: 18 April 2015 (Tribeca Festival); 12 February 2016 (United Kingdom)
- Running time: 103 minutes
- Country: United Kingdom
- Language: English
- Budget: £1 million
- Box office: US$56,971

The Survivalist is a 2015 British post-apocalyptic science fiction thriller film written and directed by Stephen Fingleton. It stars Martin McCann, Mia Goth and Olwen Fouéré.

Set after a catastrophic global population collapse, the film centres on a solitary man defending his woodland cabin and vegetable plot whose precarious routine is disrupted by the arrival of a mother and daughter, forcing uneasy bargains and escalating violence.

The screenplay was developed through Northern Ireland Screen's New Talent Focus scheme and appeared on the Hollywood Black List and the Brit List of unproduced screenplays. The film premiered at the Tribeca Film Festival in 2015 and later screened at the BFI London Film Festival. It was released in the United Kingdom on 12 February 2016, followed by a limited theatrical release in the United States in 2017. The Survivalist received critical acclaim and won the Douglas Hickox Award at the 2015 British Independent Film Awards.

== Plot ==
After a catastrophic global population collapse, an unnamed man, known only as the Survivalist, lives alone in woodland. He protects a small cabin and vegetable plot with traps and alarms, surviving by hunting, foraging and farming.

Two strangers arrive: Kathryn, an older woman, and her daughter Milja. At gunpoint, Kathryn attempts to trade jewellery and seeds for food. When he refuses, she offers Milja for sex in exchange for provisions. The Survivalist accepts and allows them to remain on the condition that the arrangement continues. Over time, the three establish an uneasy domestic routine, but mistrust grows as supplies diminish. Privately, Kathryn and Milja consider killing the Survivalist to conserve food, and Milja secretly removes ammunition from his shotgun.

Milja is later abducted by a drifter while bathing. The Survivalist tracks them, but when he attempts to reload his gun he discovers the missing ammunition and is shot in the stomach. He manages to kill the drifter with a knife and escapes with Milja. Milja and Kathryn bring him back to the cabin, remove the bullet and cauterise the wound. As infection develops, Kathryn argues they should let him die, but Milja insists they nurse him until he recovers.

Soon afterwards, a group of raiders arrives at night and attempts to force entry. The trio remains silent until the men leave, but the cabin and plot are ransacked and much of the food is taken. As hunger worsens, Milja realises she is pregnant. Kathryn again urges killing the Survivalist, claiming there is only enough food for two, and Milja prepares to poison him with mushrooms. Instead, Milja poisons Kathryn. As she dies, Kathryn asks the Survivalist to cut her wrists and bury her; he complies.

The Survivalist later tells Milja about his brother, whom he abandoned during a theft from other survivors in order to escape. While foraging, they see the raiders have returned. The Survivalist decides they must flee, but first seeks to recover a cache of stored seeds. The raiders return and begin dismantling the cabin; Milja slips inside to retrieve the seeds and alerts the men as she escapes. The pair is pursued into the woods and separated. The Survivalist distracts the raiders and is killed.

Milja continues alone until she reaches a guarded, fortified compound. She surrenders her belongings at the gate and is told the community will vote on whether to admit her. Noticing her pregnancy, a guard asks what she will name the baby; Milja replies, "If it's a boy…"

== Cast ==
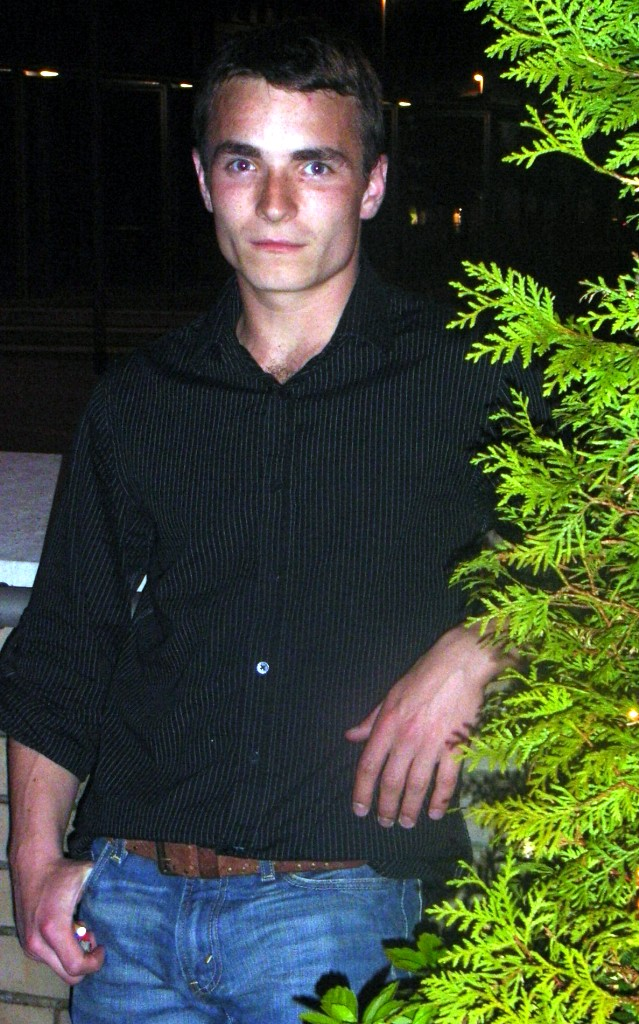
Martin McCann, who plays the Survivalist

- Martin McCann as The Survivalist
- Mia Goth as Milja
- Olwen Fouéré as Kathryn
- Andrew Simpson as The Gaunt Man
- Douglas Russell as The Snatcher
- Kieri Kennedy as The Woman in the Photograph

== Production ==
=== Development ===
Writer-director Stephen Fingleton developed The Survivalist through Northern Ireland Screen's New Talent Focus scheme, from a screenplay that had appeared on the 2012 Hollywood Black List and topped the 2013 Brit List. In February 2014, production company The Fyzz Facility produced Fingleton's short film Magpie as an introduction to the feature's world.

The film was produced by The Fyzz Facility, Northern Ireland Screen and the British Film Institute, in association with Goldcrest Post Production; producers included Wayne Marc Godfrey, Robert Jones and David Gilbery. Fingleton said he structured the screenplay so that it contains no dialogue for the first 17 pages. Mia Goth described a rehearsal table workshop where the cast crossed out anything the film "didn't need". Fingleton said the screenplay's inclusion on the Hollywood Black List increased its credibility with potential cast members, and that he was encouraged to attach a more recognisable star to make the project "bigger", but he remained committed to casting Martin McCann in the lead role.

=== Filming ===
Principal photography began in June 2014, with filming in Northern Ireland. Actor preparation included survival training: McCann said he attended a course with Survival NI and learned skills such as skinning a rabbit.

To reflect the characters' starvation, the cast followed restrictive diets under the guidance of a nutritionist. Goth said the actors were limited to roughly 900–1,000 calories a day, and that she camped outdoors for much of the shoot, including five weeks sleeping outside. McCann also described being on a low-calorie diet during production, alongside time spent in the film's forested locations.

=== Cinematography and post-production ===
Cinematographer Damien Elliott shot primarily on an Arri Alexa Plus, aiming to work with very low light levels for scenes set inside the cabin, lit largely by practical sources such as a stove fire and oil lamps; some material in tight spaces used a Blackmagic Cinema Camera. Elliott said most of the film was shot using Angénieux Optimo zoom lenses, with Zeiss Super Speeds used for specific sequences.

Editing began on location, with editor Mark Towns working from a suite set up in a caravan; Goldcrest handled most post-production in London, with the grade completed at Goldcrest New York by colourist John Dowdell. Fingleton chose not to use a conventional musical score, stating that music would be scarce in a world without electricity, and instead prioritised sound design. He later said that most onscreen sounds were re-recorded in post-production and that the film was mixed in mono to create a heightened aural perspective.

== Release ==
The Survivalist premiered at the Tribeca Film Festival in 2015, where writer-director Stephen Fingleton received a special jury mention for Best New Narrative Director. The film later screened at the BFI London Film Festival in October 2015.

Bulldog Film Distribution acquired the UK rights and aimed for a Q1 2016 theatrical release. It was released in the United Kingdom in cinemas and on demand on 12 February 2016. According to The Numbers, the film received a limited theatrical release in the United States on 19 May 2017 via IFC Midnight, followed by a home media release on 3 October 2017 through Shout! Factory.

=== Commercial performance ===
The film received a limited theatrical release. In the United Kingdom, The Numbers reported an opening weekend gross of US$13,444 from 27 theatres and a total UK box office gross of US$33,973. Box Office Mojo reported additional box office receipts from Norway, bringing the film's worldwide gross to US$56,971.

=== Critical reception ===
On the review aggregator website Rotten Tomatoes, 96% of 47 critics' reviews are positive. The website's consensus reads: "The Survivalist's deliberate pace pays gripping dividends with a tautly told post-apocalyptic drama that offers some uniquely thought-provoking twists." Metacritic, which uses a weighted average, assigned the film a score of 80 out of 100, based on 10 critics, indicating "generally favorable" reviews.

Reviewers frequently highlighted the film's stripped-back approach—lean dialogue, close observation of routine, and escalating tension—as well as its emphasis on moral compromise in a resource-scarce world. Mark Kermode described it as a "stripped-down exercise in cinematic exposition", told "through gesture and action rather than dialogue", and singled out its nature-forward soundscape (with no music guiding audience response). Peter Bradshaw likewise praised the film's "gritty realism and flair", calling it an "overwhelmingly tense and brutal thriller" and pointing to the shifting power dynamics between its three leads.

Several critics focused on performances and craft. Tara Brady, writing in The Irish Times, praised the film's "pitilessly and commendably economic" storytelling and described a "triumvirate of splendid actors", also noting Damien Elliott's "stealthy tracking shots" through the surrounding wilderness. Time Out called it an "ambiguous, effective" debut, arguing that the unclear specifics of the collapse ultimately work in the film's favour while it studies how trust and loyalty warp under pressure.

A minority of critics gave mixed reviews. Katie Walsh of the Los Angeles Times wrote that the "incredibly spare" screenplay can feel "achingly slow" (though punctuated by sudden violence), and suggested the film is at times "too restrained" with "cryptic resolutions", even as she found it "riveting" and "morally confounding". Writing for Little White Lies, David Jenkins described the film as "extremely well put together" and suggested it marked its director as a talent to watch, but stated that it lacked originality; he concluded it was not "quite the full article".

Eric Kohn of IndieWire characterised it as a riveting survival drama, comparing its stripped-down premise to a rural Mad Max scenario.

=== Analysis ===
Scholars have situated The Survivalist within contemporary ecocinema and post-apocalyptic discourse. In Transformations, Wood Roberdeau describes the film as a forest-bound "microcosm" in which global ecological collapse is refracted through domestic routine and spatial confinement. He argues that the film's attention to gardening, hunting and perimeter maintenance foregrounds the "scalar aesthetics" of the Anthropocene, compressing planetary crisis into intimate, everyday labour. Roberdeau also notes that the opening credits' graphic juxtaposing population growth with oil depletion frames the narrative within resource exhaustion and environmental limits. Drawing on Heidegger, Levinas and Derrida, he interprets the shifting dynamics between the three protagonists as an exploration of dwelling, hospitality and hostility under conditions of scarcity, while ecofeminist themes emerge in the gendered symbolism of seed offerings and sexual exchange.

Writing in Aesthetic Investigations, Dror Pimentel interprets the film as an ethical parable structured around sacrifice and responsibility. He contends that the Survivalist's abandonment of his brother and eventual self-sacrifice frame survival as inseparable from moral compromise, and that Milja's arrival at a fortified community presents hospitality as conditional rather than redemptive.

== Accolades ==
Awards and nominations received by The Survivalist
| Award | Year | Category | Recipient(s) | Result | Ref(s). |
|---|---|---|---|---|---|
| British Academy Film Awards | 2016 | Outstanding Debut by a British Writer, Director or Producer | Stephen Fingleton | Nominated | |
| British Independent Film Awards | 2015 | Douglas Hickox Award | Stephen Fingleton | Won | |
| British Independent Film Awards | 2015 | Most Promising Newcomer | Mia Goth | Nominated | |
| Dublin Film Critics' Circle Awards | 2016 | Best Irish Film | Stephen Fingleton | Nominated | |
| Imagine Film Festival | 2016 | Méliès d'Argent | Stephen Fingleton | Won | |
| Irish Film Awards | 2016 | Best Actor in a Lead Role – Film | Martin McCann | Nominated | |
| Irish Film Awards | 2016 | Best Film | Stephen Fingleton | Nominated | |
| Irish Film Awards | 2016 | Best Actress in a Supporting Role – Film | Olwen Fouéré | Nominated | |
| Irish Film Awards | 2016 | Best Director – Film | Stephen Fingleton | Nominated | |
| Irish Film Awards | 2016 | Rising Star Award | Stephen Fingleton | Won | |
| Méliès International Festivals Federation | 2016 | Méliès d'Or | Stephen Fingleton | Nominated | |
| Sitges Film Festival | 2015 | Citizen Kane Award for Best Directorial Revelation | Stephen Fingleton | Won | |
| Tribeca Film Festival | 2015 | Best New Narrative Director – Special Jury Mention | Stephen Fingleton | Won | |
| Tribeca Film Festival | 2015 | Best Narrative Feature | Stephen Fingleton | Nominated | |
| Zurich Film Festival | 2015 | Best International Feature Film | Stephen Fingleton | Nominated | |
