= List of Emmerdale characters introduced in 1991 =

The following is a list of characters that first appeared in the British soap opera Emmerdale in 1991, by order of first appearance.

== Paula Barker ==
Paula Barker
- Emmerdale character
- Portrayed by: Judy Brooke
- First appearance: 14 February 1991
- Last appearance: 28 May 1991
- Introduced by: Stuart Doughty

Paula Barker is a classmate of Mark Hughes (Craig McKay), who has a crush on her. Mark begins dating Paula but they suffer a setback when Paula has a heated confrontation at a family dinner with Mark's stepfather Joe Sugden (Frazer Hines) who is feuding with her father, an avid rambler, over right of way. Following a disastrous camping trip with Mark's sister Rachel Hughes (Glenda McKay), Mark and Paula split up.

== Alice Bates ==
Alice Bates
- Emmerdale character
- Portrayed by: Kimberly Hewitt (1991–1994); Rachel Tolboys (1994–2001)
- Duration: 1991–1999, 2001
- First appearance: 14 February 1991
- Last appearance: 12 December 2001
- Introduced by: Stuart Doughty (1991); Steve Frost (2001)
In-universe information
- Father: Nick Bates
- Mother: Elsa Chappell
- Grandfathers: Malcolm Bates
- Grandmothers: Caroline Bates; Elizabeth Pollard
- Uncles: Michael Feldmann
- Aunts: Kathy Glover

Alice Bates made her first appearance on 14 February 1991. She was played by two actresses: Kimberley Hewitt from 1991 to 1994 and by Rachel Tolboys from 1994 to 1999, with a reappearance in 2001. Hewitt made her final appearance on 9 June 1994, with a recast Alice first seen portrayed by Tolboys on 14 June 1994, just one episode later.

Alice was born to Nick Bates and Elsa Feldmann. Nick and Elsa were due to get married but Elsa went into premature labour and Zoe Tate delivered the baby at Mill Cottage. Elsa struggled to adapt to life as a mother and so on Christmas Eve 1991, she left Nick, taking Alice with her. Struggling to cope, Elsa later gave Alice to Nick, saying that Alice prevented her from having a social life. In December 1993, a plane crashed in the village. Alice's dad Nick was out with his friend, Archie Brooks, and Alice's live-in childminder. That night, Nick and Archie got a babysitter, Ruth Jameson, who left Alice alone just before the plane came down. Archie was killed but Nick survived. Alice was feared dead but was pulled out of the rubble of what had been her home a few days later. Nick spent several weeks in hospital and Alice went to stay with Elsa, who tried to make the arrangement permanent, claiming that Nick and Archie were lovers and that they neglected Alice, putting her in danger. The court didn't agree and Nick was awarded custody and Elsa left the area.

Nick is sent to prison for accidentally shooting a poacher. Alice went to live with Nick's sister, Kathy, who desperately tried to contact Elsa but was shocked to discover she'd moved to Australia without telling anyone. Realising she was all Alice had left and just how selfish and uncaring Elsa was, Kathy took custody of Alice. However, later that year, Kathy and Alice started getting threats from the family of the man Nick had killed. Nick and Kathy's mother, Caroline, came to Emmerdale and wanted to take Alice to Scarborough. However, Kathy was determined to fulfil Nick's wish of having Alice with her. Despite Kathy's best efforts to protect Alice from what Nick had done, she was forced to tell Alice the truth when Sarah Sugden told her that Alice had been telling people that Nick was in Australia, leading to Robert Sugden attempting to tell her that Nick was in prison.

Alice is approached by a mysterious woman, who claims to be Nick's girlfriend. The woman, Karen, keeps coming to see Alice and tells Kathy that when Nick gets released, they and Alice will be moving to Boston. Kathy was annoyed at Karen for getting Alice's hopes up about Nick being released, knowing there was very little chance he would get off. Kathy went to see Nick who confirmed that what Karen was saying was true and that even if he went to prison, he wanted Karen to take Alice. A couple of weeks later, Nick was sentenced to 10 years in prison and Karen left for Boston alone. Kathy, meanwhile, was left to tell Alice, then aged just six, that her dad was not coming home and it would just be the two of them from now on. Kathy, who had grown very close to Alice, was relieved that she could keep Alice, but was upset at the thought of her brother spending so long in prison.

Alice is looked after by 14-year-old Emma Cairns. Emma takes Alice to the playground; however, while she was chatting to friends, Alice disappeared. The whole village searches for her but to no avail. Meanwhile, Jack Sugden returns from a weekend in Sheffield and, while stopping at a service station to call his wife Sarah, Jack spots Alice being led away by Karen. Jack was able to save Alice and returned her to the village while Karen is arrested for child abduction and perverting the course of justice. Alice is knocked over by a dog. The owner of the dog, Doug Hamilton, seemed taken with Kathy and asked her out to dinner as a way of compensation for frightening Alice. After a few dates, Kathy was shocked to find out that Doug was married. Doug then asked Kathy and Alice to come on holiday with him.

Kathy's boyfriend, Biff Fowler, proposed to her. Alice got on extremely well with Biff and was excited about the wedding. However, on the day, Biff couldn't go through with it and jilted Kathy before leaving Emmerdale for good on his motor-bike. Kathy and Alice were left devastated by Biff's departure. Kathy and Alice came home from school and found Elsa waiting for them. Elsa told Kathy that she was married to an Australian man named Brett and he had a son, Shane, and Elsa wanted to get to know Alice. Alice was worried that Elsa would try and take her away but Kathy assured her that this wouldn't happen.

On their first visit, Alice was hostile to Elsa, choosing to play in her room instead and Kathy was suspicious when Elsa asked if she could collect Alice from school the next day. Alice began asking Kathy why her mother had left and Kathy wondered how much she should tell Alice, then aged eight. Elsa and Alice went for a pizza after school and they began to bond. When they got home, Kathy was upset when Alice asked to see Elsa the next day. Kathy agreed to meet Elsa to discuss Alice but things didn't go well when Elsa revealed that she wanted Alice to live with her. The next day, Kathy visited Nick and told him that Elsa was back and he begged her to keep Elsa away, saying that he was depending on her. Elsa later angered Kathy by showing Alice pictures of Australia and told her she had a step-brother, Shane. Alice found Kathy and Elsa having a blazing row and ran off, clearly upset by what she'd witnessed. Elsa later told Alan Turner that she was beginning to wonder if fighting for custody was the right thing to do as Alice seemed perfectly happy where she was.

Elsa was considering going home until she heard Betty gossiping about Kathy's recent troubles, causing her to change her mind. Kathy was devastated when Nick told her that Elsa had visited and convinced him that Alice would be better off with her so Kathy told Alice that Elsa wanted to take her away so Alice refused to see Elsa. A welfare officer came to speak to Kathy and Elsa about Alice's future and told them that if they could not agree, then a judge would decide. The welfare officer granted Elsa visitation rights and so Elsa decided to take Alice on holiday to London for a few days.

When Alice returned, Kathy lost her temper when she told her what a great time she'd had. Meanwhile, Elsa told Alan that she thought it was only a matter of time before Alice agreed to go and live with her. Alice became upset when she overheard Kathy talking about her feelings for Elsa was and turned to Alan. Meanwhile, Elsa's husband and stepson arrived and Alice enjoyed getting to know them. Alice particularly enjoyed spending time with Shane, who was only a couple of years older than her. However, after a few weeks, they needed to go home, upsetting Alice. After seeing this, Kathy agreed that Alice should go too. The next day Kathy asked Alice if she would like to go with Elsa but Alice asked if Kathy wanted her to go, forcing her to fight her feelings. Alice seemed enthusiastic about living with her mum but as the day progressed and the thought of leaving Kathy and Emmerdale hit Alice, she told Kathy that she didn't want to leave. That night when Elsa and Brett arrived to collect Alice. Elsa thanked Kathy for everything she had done over the last few years and told her she was welcome to visit whenever she wanted. Before Alice left, she gave Kathy one of her teddies and told her to cuddle it when she felt sad. Kathy then said a tearful goodbye to Alice as she left.

Kathy visits Alice in Australia, having not seen her in nearly two years. She brings Alice home with her and Kathy tells her boyfriend, Andrew, that she was concerned for her niece's safety and brought her back without Elsa's knowledge. The following day, the seriousness of her actions hit Kathy and she was forced to contact a solicitor to find out her legal position. She told the solicitor that she feared Alice was being mistreated. However, her hopes were dashed when she was told that without evidence of abuse, she could face charges of child abduction. It was not long before Elsa arrived in Emmerdale and she demanded to know why Kathy had taken her daughter. Kathy was not prepared to give Alice up without a fight and so disappeared with her again.

Kathy headed to the Sugden's farm with Alice and asked Jack not to tell anyone where she was. Alan Turner assured Elsa that Kathy would return Alice soon but Elsa was not convinced and wanted to call the police. The following day, Alan heard the Sugden children talking in the shop and realised that Kathy and Alice were at the farm. Turner felt it was his duty to tell Elsa where her daughter was. Elsa headed up to the farm to have it out with Kathy but was stunned when Alice, upset after visiting Nick in prison, told Elsa that she hated her and didn't want to be with her. Elsa was left with no option but to return to the B&B to think things over. The following day, Kathy took Alice to see Elsa and they agree that Alice's happiness is what matters and it isn't too late to put things right. Elsa insisted that she and Alice were returning to Australia, making Kathy realise that she had no choice but to let Elsa take Alice. Despite wanting to return to Australia, Alice was upset at the prospect of leaving Kathy again and tried to convince her to move to Australia. Although Kathy initially insisted it wasn't practical, she eventually realised that there was little keeping her in Emmerdale and decided to make the move to Australia, much to Alice's delight. Kathy told Elsa of her plans, who agreed that it sounded like a good compromise. On 12 December 2001, Kathy waved Elsa and Alice off as they headed back to Australia, knowing she would see them soon. Kathy tied up loose ends in the village and on 20 December 2001, left to join Alice in Sydney.

== Rick ==
Rick
- Emmerdale character
- Portrayed by: Julian Griffin
- Duration: 1991–1992
- First appearance: 27 August 1991
- Last appearance: 13 August 1992
- Introduced by: Stuart Doughty
In-universe information
- Occupation: Student

Rick, played by Julian Griffin, is a student at the University of Leeds. When Rachel Hughes arrives to survey her student accommodation ahead of the Academic Year, she is surprised to see him there as she only expected to find her schoolfriend, Alison Nelson there. Rachel initially considers Rick rude when he does not shake Rachel's stepfather Joe Sugden's hand or make eye contact. Alison explains that Ric lives in the flat next door and only shares the communal kitchen and is blind, much to Rachel's embarrassment. Rick introduces Joe and Rachel to his guide dog, Vaughn, and all agree to go to the pub.

A few weeks later, Rick helps Rachel move in and cooks her a meal. Rick meets Rachel's friend Elsa Feldmann who visits the city on day trip and they get along well. The following summer, Rick visits the village for a few days and meets several of Rachel's friends at the Woolpack. Alan Turner asks Rick to take Vaughn outside unaware that he is a guide dog but apologises and offers free drinks. Michael Feldmann, Rachel's ex-boyfriend spots Rick and assumes that Rachel has been seeing him and argument ensues. At the end of the visit, Rick announces he is going to Canada for a year.

== Carol Nelson ==
Carol Nelson
- Emmerdale character
- Portrayed by: Philomena McDonagh
- Duration: 1991–1993
- First appearance: 26 September 1991
- Last appearance: 25 November 1993
- Introduced by: Stuart Doughty
In-universe information
- Husband: Derek Nelson (divorced)
- Daughters: Lorraine Nelson

Carol Nelson was played by Philomena McDonagh. She first appeared in 1991 as a new barmaid at the Woolpack pub and in 1992 was joined by her daughter Lorraine. Carol was a good barmaid, but frequently overstepped the mark – for example, taking over the food service without landlord Alan Turner's (Richard Thorp) permission whilst he was away – and was rather too fond of gossiping.

Carol's sometimes judgemental nature eventually caused seriously problems when she made a complain to social services that Alice Bates wasn't being looked after properly, angering Alice's father Nick. However, Carol found herself the subject of judgement and gossip when Lorraine confessed her father, Carol's ex-husband, had been sexually abusing her. Carol was devastated, but Lorraine was upset that her mother seemed more worried about the potential scandal. Carol eventually realised she owed it to her daughter to support her, whatever other people might say.

Eventually Carol began to irritate Alan, and he considered sacking her. Fortunately, Carol decided to leave of her own accord when Lorraine needed to be closer to Lorraine's college in Skipdale. Carol left Beckindale on 25 November 1993, with Alan even giving her a good reference to help her find a new job in a local pub.

== Alex ==
Alex
- Emmerdale character
- Portrayed by: Guy Scantlebury
- Duration: 1991–1992
- First appearance: 31 October 1991
- Last appearance: 25 June 1992
- Introduced by: Stuart Doughty

Alex, played by Guy Scantlebury, is a friend of Chris Tate who arrives for Chris' wedding to Kathy Merrick. As part of Alex's best man duties, he takes Chris off for a bachelor party and attends the wedding. Alex returns to following March after being relocated to Leeds. Alex pursues Lynn Whiteley, who is uninterested him. Alex continues pursuing Lynn until she publicly chastises him in the Woolpack for pestering her.

Several weeks later, Chris lets Alex stay with him and Kathy for a while but within two months their friendship begins to deteriorate, with Chris and Alex coming to blows. The final straw comes when Alex sides with Kathy who refuses to go out for a meal with Chris because she is tired. An angry Chris then orders Alex to leave.

== Others ==
| Character | Date(s) | Actor | Circumstances |
|---|---|---|---|
| Gary Lipman | 3 January – 21 March | Nick Orchard (6 episodes) | Gary is a representative of Skipdale Breweries who offers to buy out Amos Brearly's half of The Woolpack. |
| April Brooks | 29 January – 19 April 1991 | Anna Keaveney | The estranged mother of Archie Brooks. She came to the village claiming she wanted to make up things with Archie, but in reality she wanted to con him in order to pay her boyfriend's court fine. After discovering this, Archie gave her the money and told her to leave the village. |
| Tracy aka Miss "Skipdale Breweries" | 21 March 1991 | Jayne Ashbourne | A local celebrity who attended to the re-opening of The Woolpack. Her entrance goes off with a misfire when she is trapped in the barrel and has to be freed by Skipdale Brewery rep Gary Lipman (Nick Orchard). Seth Armstrong (Stan Richards) talks her into letting him distribute coupons for one free pint, much to the irritation of landlord Alan Turner (Richard Thorp) when he and Bill Middleton (Johnny Caesar) cash in their coupons. |
| Instructor | 16–25 April | Nadja Zee (2 episodes) | An aerobics instructor who runs classes in the village hall. |
| Alison Nelson | 18 April 1991; 27 August – 28 November 1991; 12–24 March 1992 | Rachel Egan (7 episodes) | A schoolfriend of Rachel Hughes who attends the University of Leeds. Alison shows Rachel the campus and Rachel then decides to enrol. Several months later, Rachel is accepted to the university and moves with Alison and Rick, a fellow student. |
| Louise | 4 June – 3 December 1991 | Tricia Penrose | A friend of Elsa Feldmann. They meet at evening classes in Hotten but frequently skip lessons to go to the Black Bull pub and participate in Karaoke. |
| Duffy | 4–9 July | David J Nicholls (2 episodes) | An ice cream man who works for Hotten Ices. He and his associate threaten Archie Brooks, who is also selling ice cream outside of Connelton Primary off of their patch and assault him with ice cream. However, with the help of Mark Hughes and his classmates from Hotten Comprehensive, Archie is able to gain revenge against Duffy when Mark prints some two for one special offer leaflets for Hotten Ices, prompting Duffy to drive away when he sees a group of children coming. |
