= James Gralton =

Irish socialist politician (1886–1945)

Personal details
- Born: 17 April 1886 Effrinagh, County Leitrim, Ireland
- Died: 29 December 1945 (aged 59) Bellevue Hospital, New York City, United States
- Party: Communist Party of Ireland; Fianna Fáil
- Nickname(s): Jim, Jimmy

Military service
- Branch/service: Irish Republican Army (1919–1922); British Army; U. S. Navy
- Unit: Royal Irish Regiment
- Battles/wars: Irish War of Independence

James Gralton (17 April 1886 – 29 December 1945) was an Irish socialist leader who became a United States citizen after emigrating in 1907 and, later, the only Irishman ever deported from independent Ireland.

== Biography ==
=== Early life ===
James Gralton was born on 17 April 1886 in the townland of Effrinagh in Kiltoghert parish, about six miles from Carrick-on-Shannon in County Leitrim. His parents were Micheal Gralton and Alice Campbell. There were four girls and three boys in the family: Winnie, Mary Ann, Alice and Maggie Kate were the girls, and the boys were Jimmy, Charles and a little boy who died young. Gralton was reared on a small farm of about twenty-five acres of bad land, which was surrounded by some good land. The people were too poor to buy fertiliser for the crops so they had to burn some of the topsoil, and this left the land poor and shallow. He received his only formal education at Kiltoghert national school, which he left at the age of 12 to go work as a grocery boy in Carrick-on-Shannon.

=== Adult life ===
Gralton later went to work in Dublin as a bartender before joining the British army, serving first in the Royal Irish Regiment. However, after being disciplined for refusing to serve with his regiment in India, he deserted and spent some time working in the Liverpool docks and Welsh coalmines.

Gralton emigrated to the United States in 1907, where he was granted US citizenship after briefly joining the US Navy. He later worked around as a taxi-driver and barman. As Gralton became more absorbed in American culture and society he came to feel that Irish society was insular and conservative in comparison and also became unsure about some of the aspects of Irish Nationalism. Instead, c. 1919 Gralton joined the newly founded Communist Party USA, as well as setting up his own James Connolly clubs.

In 1922 Gralton returned to Ireland and Leitrim to fight in the Irish War of Independence. Gralton raised funds for the newly created Irish Republican Army as well as recruiting and training volunteers himself. As he did this, Gralton tried to instil in those recruits some of his social and political views. Around the same time Gralton built on his own land a Pearse–Connolly memorial hall with the aid of local volunteer labour, which was used to provide educational classes for young school-leavers and social events. The circle which gravitated around the hall included Republicans, farmers, and trade unionists, and the hall was also used as a Dáil Court (a judicial system run by Sinn Féin to counter the British court system). There in the Dáil court, local farmers settled land disputes.

Following the signing of the Anglo-Irish Treaty, Gralton came to be viewed with suspicion, particularly by members of the National Army, who arrested him for taking forceful possession of disputed land. After his release and shortly after the start of the Irish Civil War, Gralton once again returned to the United States. While there he joined the Leitrim Republican Club of New York in 1927.

=== Political activism in Leitrim ===
Following the death of his brother Charles, Gralton returned home again to County Leitrim to take over his farm and look after his parents. Gralton once again took up political activity. He ran the county's branch of the Revolutionary Workers' Group, a predecessor of the Communist Party of Ireland. Gralton reopened his old hall in Effrinagh and once again started to organise free events and spread his political views. Around the same time he joined Fianna Fáil. However, he didn't last long in the party and was expelled for his radical views. In August 1932 he rejoined the IRA.

As a "convinced communist and atheist", being expelled from Fianna Fáil and joining the IRA, Gralton was developing a reputation as an agitator in Leitrim. Local priests became to speak out against him and his hall, denouncing it as a "den of prostitution" and communism. This led to violent protests against these dances, which culminated in a shooting incident. In December 1932, the hall was burnt down.

Following this, on 9 February 1933, he was served with a deportation order to return the United States of America, on the basis that he was an alien. Gralton went on the run while demanding a fair trial and received support from the Dublin based Revolutionary Workers Group. Some Republicans such as Peadar O'Donnell and George Gilmore came to his aid, but others did not. The local IRA unit opposed his deportation but took little active measures to stop it. There has even been speculation it was members of the local IRA themselves who burnt down Gralton's hall, seeing him as too radical even for the IRA. The IRA in 1933 did not wish to be identified as communist, particular as the Cumann na nGaedheal party were trying to use red scare tactics against both Fianna Fáil and the IRA. The IRA army council forbade the socialists Frank Ryan and Mick Price from campaigning in Leitrim on Gralton's behalf. Peadar O'Donnell travelled to Drumsna, County Leitrim for a public meeting in support of Gralton but was violently attacked by locals led by the parish priest. Another group of socialists led by Hanna Sheehy-Skeffington came down from Dublin to support Gralton. However BJ Maguire, a Fianna Fáil TD for Leitrim–Sligo, came out against Gralton for "propagating English ideas". Local members of Fianna Fáil and trade unions were divided over Gralton.

In August 1933 Gralton was caught by the authorities and deported to the US from Galway.

=== Exile in New York ===
In October 1933 Gralton stood unsuccessfully as a candidate for the Communist party in the 13th district of Manhattan, New York. As a member of the New York based Irish Workers Club, Gralton ran courses, spreading the teachings of James Connolly.

Shortly before his death from stomach cancer, in New York on 29 December 1945, he married Bessie Cronogue (d. 1975), a woman from Drumsna, near where he had been brought up.

== Jimmy's Hall ==
It was announced in April 2014 that Jimmy's Hall, a film by British filmmaker Ken Loach based on the life of Gralton, had been selected for competition at the 2014 Cannes Film Festival. It was released on 30 May 2014. This film was partially filmed in Drumsna, near Gralton's birthplace in Effrinagh.

In 2017, Dublin's Abbey Theatre presented a musical adaptation of the film. It had its world premiere in Carrick-on-Shannon in advance of its run at the Abbey.

== Campaign for apology ==
In 2015, a campaign was launched to exonerate Gralton by officially rescinding the deportation order and offering an apology to his family. A motion to support this campaign was passed by Leitrim and Sligo County Councils and the campaign was extended throughout Ireland. An online petition was launched on 23 December 2015 by the then-Mayor of Sligo, Councillor Thomas Healy.

On 3 September 2016 President of Ireland Michael D. Higgins said the only deportation of an Irishman from Ireland was "wrong and indefensible". President Higgins unveiled a memorial to Gralton at Effrinagh, on the site where the hall once stood. The stone edifice, which tells the story of Gralton's life as a labour campaigner, was partially funded by the trade union movement.

== Musical tributes ==
- Singer-songwriter Tim O'Riordan wrote a song, Gralton, to celebrate Gralton's life. It was recorded on his 2018 album Taibhse.
- Singer/songwriter Mick Blake wrote a tribute to Gralton entitled "The Lonely Lanes of Leitrim".

== Further resources ==
- O'Suilleabhain, Cormac (2019). Leitrim's Republican Story 1900-2000. Third edition. pp. 225–228. ISBN 978-0-9930265-3-9
- O'Farrell, Padraic (1996). Tales for the telling: true life stories of Irish 'scandals'. Collins Press. pp. 41–56. ISBN 978-1-898256-16-8.
- Deported - The Gralton Story, a film by Michael Carolan ('See it etc. via YouTube)
