= Blood Cells (film) =

2014 British film

- Directed by: Luke Seomore, Joseph Bull
- Written by: Luke Seomore Joseph Bull, Ben Young
- Produced by: Ben Young, Samm Hailay
- Starring: Barry Ward; Hayley Squires
- Cinematography: David Procter
- Edited by: Darren Baldwin
- Music by: Luke Seomore
- Production company: Third Films
- Distributed by: Picturehouse cinemas
- Release dates: September 2014 (Venice Film Festival); 30 June 2015 (United Kingdom)
- Running time: 86 minutes
- Countries: United Kingdom; Italy

Blood Cells is a 2014 British drama film directed by Luke Seomore & Joseph Bull. The script was written by Luke Seomore, Joseph Bull and Ben Young. The film stars Barry Ward, Hayley Squires, Chloe Pirrie, Jimmy Akingbola and Francis McGee.

It premiered at 71st Venice International Film Festival in 2014. It received its UK premiered in 2015 at Edinburgh International Film Festival and was nominated for the Best British Feature Film and Best Performance in a British Feature Film.

== Overview ==
Adam has lived a rootless existence since his family's farm was destroyed by the Foot-and-mouth disease epidemic of 2001. His life imploded and he abandoned his family after a single devastating incident. He has spent the years since on the nomadic fringes of British society, cycling through transitory jobs and transitory relationships, adrift from his family and past. When his younger brother Aiden reaches out to him to announce the birth of his first child−Adam is about to become an uncle−there is an ultimatum attached: come home now, or never come home again. Adam embarks on a journey home that is at once tortured and exhilarating, a panoramic tour through the broken and beautiful margins of Britain. As eruptions from his secret past begin to emerge, Adam struggles to break free from an exile that must now end before it swallows him for good.

== Cast ==
- Barry Ward as Adam
- Hayley Squires as Hayley
- Francis McGee as Cormac
- Jimmy Akingbola as Debo
- Chloe Pirrie as Lauren
- Keith McErlean as Keith

== Release ==
The film was released through Picturehouse cinemas on 30 June 2015.

== Reception ==
Blood Cells received critical acclaim. On review aggregator website Rotten Tomatoes, the film holds a 100% rating, an average score of 7.3/10. Kevin Maher at The Times give the film 4/5 stars and stated 'is a ridiculously accomplished film…it signals the arrival of future film-making heavyweights'
