= Scars (2006 film) =

2006 film directed by Leo Regan

Scars is a United Kingdom docu-drama from Channel 4 Television which aired on Channel 4 on 3 July 2006. It is also repeated at various times on Channel 4's sister channel, More4 as well as on Channel 4. Scars is a recreation of a series of interviews done over about a year with Chris, a man with a violent, dangerous past who, now with wife and child, talks about his regret for the pain he has caused to his victims, how his personality was moulded by his violent father, and his fears for his young son.

Jason Isaacs stars as Chris, and is interviewed by Leo Regan (as himself).
