= Effrinagh =

Townland in County Leitrim, Ireland

Effrinagh Ifreannach
- Townland
- Location in Ireland
- Coordinates: 53°58′26″N 7°59′35″W
- Country: Ireland
- Province: Connacht
- County: County Leitrim

Area
  - Total: 1.31 km^{2} (0.51 sq mi)
- Time zone: UTC+0 (WET)
  - Summer (DST): UTC-1 (IST (WEST))

Effrinagh (in Irish: Ifreannach) is a townland in County Leitrim, Ireland. Effrinagh is a place about five miles east of Carrick on Shannon. It is dotted with lakes and traversed by boreens (from the Irish bóithrín, meaning a small road). James Gralton came from Effrinagh, where he built his Pearse-Connolly Hall before he was deported to New York City.
