= Ultan Conlon =

Irish singer-songwriter (born 1980)

Ultan Conlon (born 1980) is an Irish singer-songwriter. He is a native of Loughrea. Conlon has performed live with John Martyn, Mary Coughlan, Lisa Hannigan, Mark Geary, Roesy, Sabrina Dinan, David Kitt, and the Four of Us. Conlon plays and teaches classical guitar.

== Career ==
He and fellow Galwegian, John Conneely, formed the group UltanJohn in 2003. His 2005 single, "Really Gone", featured John Martyn. His song, "Ring Out The Old" featured in the British film, The Beholder. Conlon shared the stage with Eddi Reader, Jackson Browne and Shelby Lynne.

His first studio album, "Bless Your Heart", was released in October 2009. In 2012, Conlon was a composer for the soundtrack for the film Songs For Amy. His sophomore record Songs of Love So Cruel dropped in 2013.

A review posted on Blogcritics described Conlon's 2018 album, Last Days of the Night Owl, as "an elegantly striking album, full of nuanced floating colors and velvety energy, along with the appealing voice of Ultan Conlon".

Conlon's fourth record There's a Waltz (2020) was produced by Grammy Award-winner Sean Watkins (Nickel Creek). Conlon met Watkins in LA in 2016, performing with him at Largo, a nightclub where Sean and Sara Watkins hosted the Watkins Family Hour. Watkins brought several musicians on board to accompany Conlon, including Don Heffington (drums); Sebastian Steinberg (bass, double bass); Gabe Witcher (fiddle); Rich Hinman (pedal steel); Sara Watkins (backing vocals); and Tyler Chester (B3, piano).

== Reception ==
"Sparks of the Night" was the first single and the official video was premiered by Americana UK where they said that Conlon's "clear, melodic vocal brings Roy Orbison to mind". The album received airplay in Ireland on RTÉ Radio 1 and the BBC in the UK. Hotpress Magazine described There's a Waltz as "a winning collection...songs of substance told with intelligence and wry observation". On the week of 17 April 2020, RTÉ Radio 1 made Conlon's There's a Waltz their album of the week.
