= Saunders Welch =

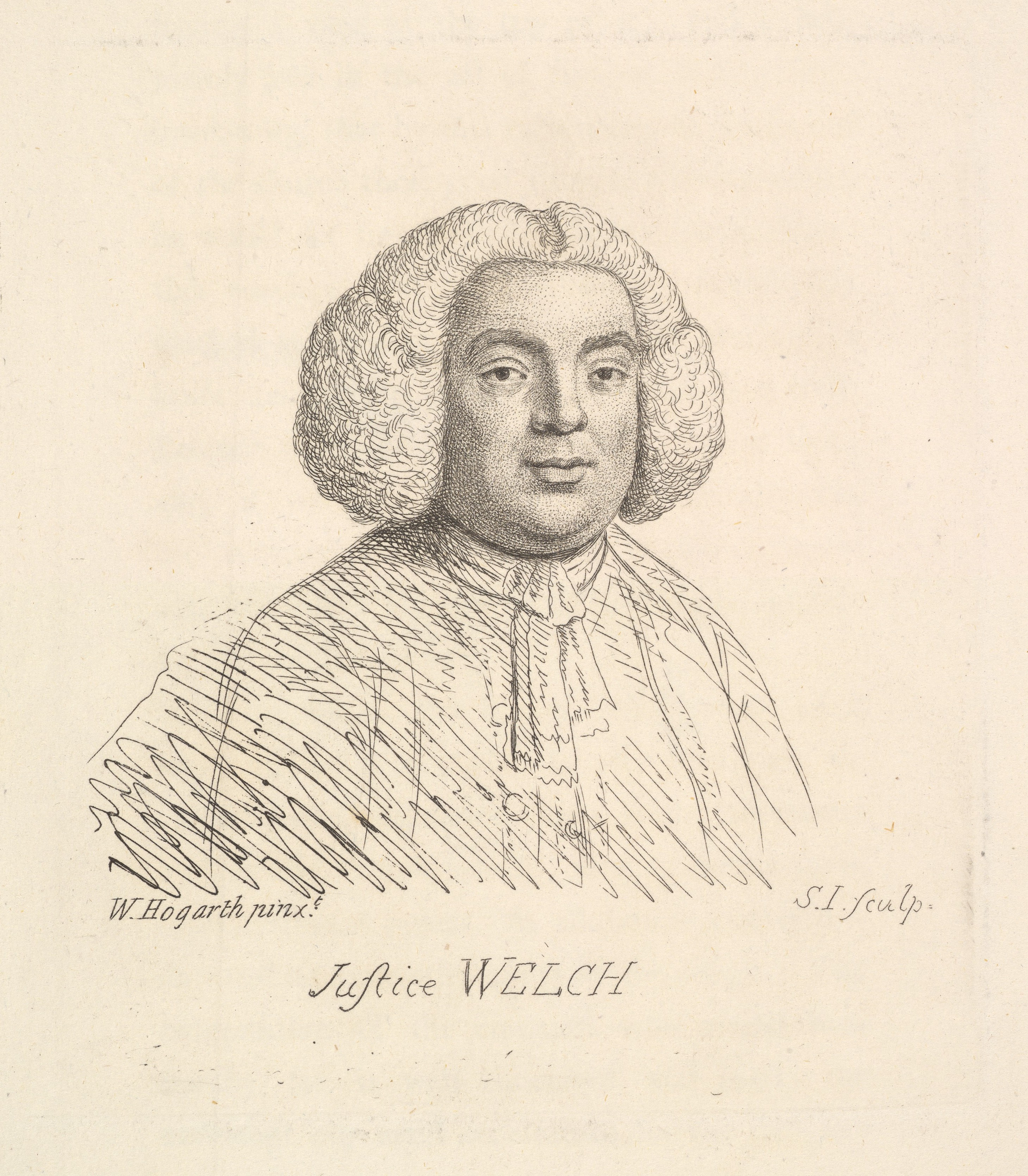
Justice Welch, a 1794 etching by Samuel Ireland after a painting by William Hogarth (Metropolitan Museum of Art, 17.3.756-2320)

Saunders Welch (2 February 1711 – 1 October 1784) was an 18th-century English businessman, justice of the peace for Middlesex, and policing pioneer.

== Life ==
He was born in Aylesbury and educated in the town's workhouse. An early biography of the sculptor Joseph Nollekens (husband to Welch's daughter Mary) stated that Welch was apprenticed to a trunk-maker in St Paul's Churchyard in the City of London, though another 1820s memoir refers to his receiving an inheritance and being "in person, mind and manners, most perfectly a gentleman". By 1734 he was living on Broad St Giles in the parish of St George's Bloomsbury and running a grocery, probably from his home, moving into a bigger residence on the corner of Bow Street (now known as Museum Street) around 1739. He began moving in artistic circles and is said to have modelled for the foot and leg of Roubiliac's statue of Handel. and subscribing to several religious, artistic and literary works from 1740 onwards. He also became involved in the Society for the Encouragement of Arts, Manufactures, and Commerce and the British Lying-In, Lock, Foundling, Madgdalen, Middlesex and St George's Hospitals.

He also became active in local politics, becoming a churchwarden (1743) and vestryman (1745) for the parish as well as high constable of Holborn (1746–1755) and member of the Middlesex commission of the peace (1755–1756). In these roles he frequently collaborated with the Fielding brothers Henry and John, with whom he shared an office at Bow Street Court. In 1749 he not only established the Universal Register Office (effectively an employment agency) with them but also led the first group of organized thief-catchers under the brothers' new policing system (later known as the Bow Street Runners) and assisted the brothers in suppressing a riot in which a mob gutted three brothels. Welch selected his men from former constables, discharged at the end of their year in office, who were prepared to receive legal training and carry on the work.

After Henry's death Welch fell out with John, leaving the Bow Street office and from the 1760s onwards joining the rota of magistrates at a new "rotation office" on Litchfield Street, attended all one winter by Welch's friend Samuel Johnson, who was portrayed there in Thomas Rowlandson's 1774 satirical print A Rotation Office. Struggles to make that office self-funding eroded his previously robust health, with the office stagnating by 1775. Welch spent two or more years in Italy for his health, finally dying at Taunton Deane in Somerset in 1784, though his body was brought back to the St George's Churchyard in Bloomsbury. His will left his daughter Mary twenty volumes of sermons by John Tillotson and a small sum of money to Johnson, as well as a lump sum to his other daughter Ann equivalent to the £200 annual income and £200 in jewels settled on Mary at the latter's marriage in 1772.

== Works ==
In 1754 Welch published An essay on the office of constable. With rules and cautions for the more safe and effectual discharge of that duty, republished four years later in an expanded edition with a new "Introduction containing some Conjectures for fixing the Original of that Office in England; and certain Historical Anecdotes concerning the Rise and Progress of the Society of Thief-Takers, and the evil Consequences naturally resulting from an Institution of that Kind". In 1758 he also published A proposal to render effectual a plan, to remove the nuisance of common prostitutes from the streets of this metropolis.
