= Damien Molony =

Irish actor

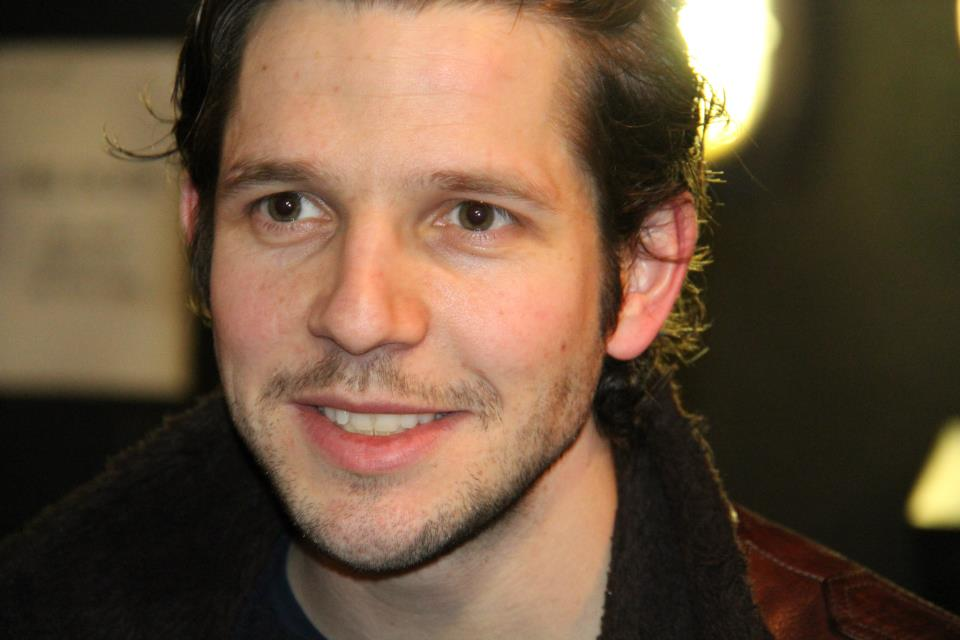
- Molony in March 2013
- Born: 21 February 1984 (age 42); Johnstownbridge, County Kildare
- Occupation: Actor
- Years active: 2007–present
- Children: 2

Damien Molony is an Irish actor. He is best known for his television roles as Hal Yorke in BBC Three's Being Human, DC Albert Flight in the BBC's Ripper Street, DS Jack Weston in Channel 5's Suspects, Jon in Channel 4's GameFace and Dylan in Sky One Original comedy Brassic.

== Early life ==
Molony studied at Clongowes Wood College in Clane, Kildare, west of Dublin, followed by Trinity College in Dublin, where he completed a degree in business and politics and became involved in the acting society. He soon moved to London to attend Drama Centre London.

== Career ==
After graduating in 2011, Molony co-starred as Giovanni in a production of the John Ford play 'Tis Pity She's a Whore at the West Yorkshire Playhouse, directed by Jonathan Munby. He won the second prize in the 2011 Ian Charleson Awards for his performance.

Molony's casting as vampire Hal in the BBC Three series Being Human brought him his first television credit. In an interview with SFX magazine, Molony revealed that when approaching the role of Hal he did research on drug addicts and alcoholics. He has previously starred in the short film When the Hurlyburly's Done, filmed in Germany.

After the filming of series 4 of Being Human, in January 2012 Damien played the lead role of Motl Mendl in the National Theatre production of Travelling Light alongside Sir Antony Sher. Following a long run at the Lyttelton Theatre, the play toured England and was broadcast in cinemas worldwide with National Theatre Live. He returned to the National Theatre in January 2015 to play Spike in Sir Tom Stoppard's The Hard Problem, which ran until 17 May 2015 and also had a worldwide broadcast via NT Live, on 16 April 2015. Both plays were directed by the then Artistic Director of the National Theatre, Sir Nicholas Hytner.

The fifth and final series of Being Human was screened in February–March 2013. At the same time Molony starred in the play "If You Don't Let Us Dream, We Won't Let You Sleep" at the Royal Court Theatre.

Damien's television slate grew when in the same year he joined the cast of Victorian BBC show Ripper Street in series 2 as Detective Constable Albert Flight. He appeared in 7 of 8 episodes on BBC One in the UK and BBC America. The crime drama was set in London's Whitechapel in the period following the Jack the Ripper murders.

Molony returned to theatre, alongside William Gaminara in the play The Body of an American by Dan O'Brien in January–February 2014 at the Gate Theatre (London) about the conversation of a war photographer and a struggling playwright.

The actor then landed the role of Detective Sergeant Jack Weston in innovative crime procedural Suspects. The drama, shot in a documentary style using fly-on-the-wall filming techniques, premiered in the UK February 2014. The show ran for five series, the last airing August 2016, with a new cast line-up and a change in format and Molony taking centre stage in a six part story. All five series of the show have also reached American audiences via streaming service Acorn TV.

Molony was cast as Robert Putnam in an HBO pilot, The Devil You Know, created by Jenji Kohan and directed by Gus Van Sant in 2015, alongside Eddie Izzard and Karen Gillan. Set in 17th century New England and focusing on the Salem witch trials, the drama was filmed in Boston USA, but was not picked up by the network.

Damien's first role in a feature film was as the character Ross in Kill Your Friends, adapted from the novel by John Niven, set in the music industry in the Britpop era. The film's theatrical premiere via Altitude Films took place in the UK and Europe November 2015, followed by a US release with Well Go USA in April 2016.

His second feature film Tiger Raid, shot in the deserts of Jordan, saw him star in a leading role alongside Brian Gleeson and Sofia Boutella. A dark thriller about a tiger kidnapping in Iraq, the film had its world premiere at Tribeca International Film festival April 2016, with a UK premiere at the Edinburgh International Film Festival in June and a UK DVD and VOD release 17 October 2016.

Appearing alongside Irish talent Aidan McArdle and Adam Fergus, Molony's next TV project was in RTÉ One crime drama Clean Break, which aired in Ireland September 2015.

He next starred alongside Phoebe Waller-Bridge in her first TV comedy Crashing as the character Anthony. The series premiered January 2016 on Channel 4 in the UK and later in the year internationally, via streaming platforms.

Damien also returned to the stage in 2016, appearing in No Man's Land alongside Ian McKellen, Patrick Stewart and Owen Teale. Directed by Sean Mathias, the production toured the UK from August, before a run a Wyndham's Theatre in London until 17 December, with a National Theatre Live broadcast to cinemas worldwide 15 December.

On 21 February 2017 Molony was announced as cast in comedy sitcom GameFace, written by Roisin Conaty who also stars as the lead character Marcella. He played Marcella's long-suffering driving instructor Jon. The six episode first series aired October to November 2017 on UK TV channel E4 and became available in the US, Australia and New Zealand shortly after via on demand platforms.

Molony appeared on stage with Sir Ian McKellen for a second time in 2017, playing Edmund in Chichester Festival Theatre production of King Lear for a short run from 22 September to 28 October.

He appeared as Bourke Cockran in his next feature film The Current War, directed by Alfonso Gomez-Rejon which world premiered at the Toronto International Film Festival on 9 September 2017. Originally set for a theatrical released on 24 November 2017, the film's cinema outing was delayed to July 2019 in the UK and October in the US, after sexual misconduct allegations were made against Harvey Weinstein, shortly followed by a DVD release.

Opening the new year in 2018, Molony starred opposite Jessie Buckley in two major BBC Radio 3 productions, adaptations of the plays 'Tis Pity She's a Whore by John Ford and The Effect by Lucy Prebble. He then played the title role in BBC Radio 4 Drama Judas, which aired every day in the week leading up to Easter. Written by Lucy Gannon, the drama told the story of disciple Judas Iscariot from his own perspective in the days leading up to the death of Jesus.

From 20 June 2018, Damien appeared in BBC Radio 4 World War 1 serial drama Home Front, playing the new character Hardy Walsh introduced in series 14, 'Needs Must When The Devil Drives'.

Damien made his first appearance in a web series in October 2018, guest starring in episode 1 of Right Now, Robert Cawsey's new online comedy based on Grindr hook-ups.

August 2018 Molony was announced as cast in new Sky One comedy TV series Brassic, co-created by Joe Gilgun and Danny Brocklehurst, starring alongside Michelle Keegan and Gilgun, as the character Dylan. Production on series 1 began in September 2018, filming completed in December, post-production completed 22 February 2019. The series premiered August 2019. A second series was announced on the same day.

A second series of GameFace was announced by Channel 4 June 2018, but Damien was only revealed as appearing in the new series when show writer Roisin Conaty published behind-the-scenes of him during filming, from March to April 2019. Series 2 aired 17 July 2019 Channel 4 in the UK and reached audiences in the US via Hulu shortly after.

In 2019, Molony also appeared in two short films with film festival premieres; Keep Breathing, a crowdfunded project written by and starring Emmeline Hartley, which is inspired by the Me Too movement and has a sexual consent theme and The Fabric Of You, an animated short, written and directed by Josephine Lohoar Self, world premiering at the 2019 Edinburgh International Film Festival. Both films had a wide release on Vimeo during 2021.

It was announced in July 2019 that Damien had joined the cast of BBC / Sister legal drama The Split for series 2, with Molony in the role of new character Tyler Donaghue. The series premiered on 11 May 2020 on BBC One in the UK, shortly followed by a release in the United States on Sundance TV, 15 May 2020.

In 2020 Damien also appeared in Brassic series 2, which premiered on SKY in the UK in May. Ahead of the second series, Sky announced a third had also been commissioned, at their Up Next 2020 showcase event. Filming for series 3 began in October 2020 and took place during the pandemic, with a premiere date of 6 October in the UK.

A third and final series of The Split was announced and began production in June 2021, with Damien confirmed to return as Tyler Donaghue.

It was announced in July 2021 that Damien would be appearing in the third series of Channel 4 drama anthology series On The Edge, in "gut-wrenching" horror Cradled.

In 2022, Molony appeared in the third series of Derry Girls on Channel 4.

Molony plays the titular role of Jersey detective Jim Bergerac in the UKTV 2025 series Bergerac, a reboot of the 1980s BBC series.

== Personal life ==
As of 2019, Molony resides in London and is married with a son and a daughter.

Molony began regularly donating blood in 2012, after someone close to him needed blood during their cancer treatment. As part of National Blood Week in 2013, he was interviewed in the summer edition of Blood Donor Magazine and appeared on the front cover as his Being Human character Hal Yorke, with the headline "a blood addict giving blood". He has since raised awareness of the importance of blood donation and campaigned to motivate others via his Twitter page. After completing his 13th donation in February 2017, he encouraged others to consider donating in order to "save lives, burn calories, [and] feel really proud".

== Filmography ==
Key
†	Denotes works that have not yet been released

=== Film ===
Year	Title	Role	Notes
2009	Making Rosebud	William West Junior	Short
2010	When the Hurlyburly's Done	Jacob	Short
2012	National Theatre Live: Travelling Light	Motl Mendl / Nate Dershowitz	
2015	National Theatre Live: The Hard Problem	Spike	
2015	Kill Your Friends	Ross	
2016	National Theatre Live: No Man's Land	Foster	
2016	Tiger Raid	Paddy	
2017	The Current War	Bourke Cockran	
2019	Keep Breathing	Adrian	Short
2019	The Fabric of You	Michael (voice)	Animated Short

=== Television ===
Year	Title	Role	Notes
2012–2013	Being Human	Hal Yorke	Series regular; 14 episodes
2013	Ripper Street	Det. Const. Albert Flight	Series regular; 7 episodes
2014–2016	Suspects	DS Jack Weston	Series regular; 23 episodes
2015	Clean Break	Danny Dempsey	Miniseries; 4 episodes
2015	The Devil You Know	Robert Putnam	Miniseries; episode: "Pilot"
2016	Crashing	Anthony	Series regular; 6 episodes
2017–2019	GameFace	Jon	Series regular; 12 episodes
2018	Right Now	Jamie	Episode: "Jamie"
2019–2023	Brassic	Dylan Golding	Series regular; 31 episodes
2020–2022	The Split	Tyler	Series regular; 11 episodes
2021	On the Edge	Lenny	Miniseries; episode: "Cradled"
2022	Derry Girls	Gabriel	Episode: "The Affair"
2023	The Great	Nikolai Shostakich	Episode: "Once Upon a Time"
2024	Daddy Issues	Fergal	Episode: "Sugar Daddies"
2024	Say Nothing	Stephen Rea	Miniseries; 2 episodes
2025	Safe Harbor	Callum McGowan	5 episodes
2025	Unforgotten	Father Luke Ryan	2 episodes
2025–2026	Bergerac	Jim Bergerac	Series regular; 12 episodes
2026	Two Weeks in August	Dan	Miniseries; 8 episodes

=== Theatre ===
Year	Title	Role	Theatre	Location	References
2007	Riders to the Sea	Bartley	Touring	Ireland	
2008	A Vampire Story	Mint	Riverbank Arts Centre, Kildare Youth Theatre	Kildare	
2011	'Tis Pity She's a Whore	Giovanni	West Yorkshire Playhouse	Leeds	
2012	Travelling Light	Motl	Lyttelton Theatre	London	
2012	First Person Shooter	Reading	WordTheatre, Latitude Festival 2012	Suffolk, England	
2013	If You Don't Let Us Dream, We Won't Let You Sleep	Jason	Royal Court Theatre	London	
2014	The Body of an American	Dan	Gate	London	
2014	Heart Strings: Bittersweet Love Stories	Readings	WordTheatre, St. James Theatre	London	
2014–2015	The Hard Problem	Spike	National Theatre	London	
2016	No Man's Land	Foster	Wyndham's Theatre	London	
2017	King Lear	Edmund	Chichester Festival Theatre	Chichester	
2019	Voices from the American Heartland	Readings	WordTheatre, Brasserie Zédel	London	
2021	Stories by Brian Doyle	Readings	WordTheatre	Live Stream	
2026	Copenhagen by Michael Frayn	Heisenburg	Hampstead Theatre	London	

=== Audio ===
Year	Title	Type	Role	References
2013	The Commitments	BBC Radio 4 Drama	James Clifford	
2013	The Hill Bachelors	BBC Radio NI Drama	Paulie	
2013–2016	Poetry Please	BBC Radio 4 Reading	Several Readings	
2014	Raven	Audiobook	Reader	
2015	Me and the Devil	BBC Radio 4 Reading	Reader	
2017	Bottle Man	BBC Radio 4 Reading	Reader	
2018	Tis Pity She's a Whore	BBC Radio 3 Drama	Giovanni	
2018	The Effect	BBC Radio 3 Drama	Tristan Frey	
2018	Judas	BBC Radio 4 Drama	Judas	
2018	Home Front	BBC Radio 4 Serial Drama	Hardy Walsh	

== Awards and nominations ==
Year	Award	Category	Work	Result
2007	All-Ireland One Act Drama Festival	Best Overall Performance	Riders to the Sea	Won
2011	Spotlight Prize	Best Actor/Actress	CDS drama schools	Nominated
2011	Ian Charleson Awards 2011	Ian Charleson Award	Tis Pity She's A Whore, West Yorkshire Playhouse	Won
2013	SFX Awards 2013	Best Actor	Being Human	Nominated
2014	Offie	Best Male Actor	The Body Of An American	Nominated
2016	National Television Awards 2016	Drama Performance	Suspects	Nominated
2020	Midlands Movie Awards	Best Actor in a Leading Role	Keep Breathing	Won
