= Hard problem =

Hard problem may refer to:

- The Hard Problem, a 2015 play by Tom Stoppard
- Hard problems, in computational complexity theory
- Hard problem of consciousness, explaining why we have qualitative phenomenal experiences
