= Tiger Raid =

- Directed by: Simon Dixon
- Written by: Simon Dixon, Mick Donnellan, Gareth Coulam Evans
- Produced by: Gareth Coulam Evans
- Starring: Brian Gleeson; Damien Molony; Sofia Boutella
- Cinematography: Si Bell
- Edited by: Nick Esdaile, Dan Roberts
- Music by: Dean Valentine
- Production companies: Dixon Baxi Evans; Samson Films; Cinepeak; Bankside Films
- Release dates: 17 April 2016 (Tribeca Film Festival); 7 October 2016 (United Kingdom)
- Running time: 92 minutes
- Countries: Ireland, United Kingdom
- Language: English

Tiger Raid is a 2016 Irish-British drama film directed by Simon Dixon and written by Simon Dixon, Mick Donnellan and Gareth Coulam Evans.

== Plot ==
Two Irish soldiers of fortune, Joe and Paddy, are working for a private security crew in the Middle East, whose boss is a man called Dave. Their next mission is to kidnap Shadha, the daughter of a powerful man. During this mission more and more about Joe's and Paddy's past is revealed. The men trust each other less and less. The situation becomes even more complicated when Paddy realizes that Shadha is his former big love. Now he not only needs to finish his mission, but has to protect Shadha from his partner, who tries to rape and kill the girl.

When Joe finds out that Shadha is more important to Paddy than his job, Joe knocks Paddy unconscious and talks with the girl to try to find out more about Paddy's past. Shadha tells Joe that she loved Paddy but she did not want to see him again. Paddy had choked and drugged her to keep her down and she only had loved him because she did not want to only feel helpless and trapped.

Joe wakes Paddy and tells him that Shadha hates him, however Paddy replies that Shadha is the only woman he has ever cared for. Joe reveals that he had killed Ruby, the only person he had ever loved before, because he had to do it. Joe adds that Paddy has to make the same sacrifices for Dave, by killing Shadha. Paddy replies that he would never kill Shadha for Dave. Paddy later says that he would kill Dave by the moment he comes to the place. However, Paddy is never able to kill Dave as Shadha shoots Paddy first, just when Joe reveals he loves Paddy. Shadha leaves and Joe sees a vision of Ruby. Ruby tells Joe that they all pay and that it is time to end it.

== Cast ==
- Brian Gleeson as Joe
- Damien Molony as Paddy
- Sofia Boutella as Shadha
- Rory Fleck Byrne as Ruby
- Evan Khader as Security Guard
- Majid Rahan as Militia Man
- Murtada Dakhel as Militia Man
- Khaled Sabbagh as Militia Man

== Overview ==
Tiger Raid is an adaptation of Mick Donnellan's stage production Radio Luxembourg. It is a Dixon Baxi Evans production. The international rights are handled by Bankside Films. Tiger Raid was filmed primarily in the Jordanian desert during the summer 2014. It was filmed at the Valley of Jordan, close to the border to the Iraq were the action in the film took place. Much of the crew was Jordanian. The lead actors are Brian Gleeson as Joe, Damien Molony as Paddy and Sofia Boutella as Shadha. The film was the debut film of director and writer Simon Dixon.

== Release ==
Tiger Raid premiered in spring 2016 at the Tribeca Film Festival in New York. After this it was shown at several other film festivals and in autumn 2016 it was released in Irish and British cinemas. On 17 October 2016, a British DVD was published.

== Critical reception ==
Hannah Wales praises the "stellar performances" of the three main actors Brian Gleeson, Damien Molony and Sofia Boutella, as well as the dialogue and the "remarkable" scripts. Stefan Pape thinks that Tiger Raid "is enriched by its war-torn backdrop, with a certain intensity injected into proceedings, and an overriding sense of desolation that adds to the tone. The narrative does go round in circles however and needless to say by the close of play tedium has well and truly taken over – but as debuts go, Dixon has presented a feature that could well signal the start of a prosperous career in film."
