= Bainne =

- Directed by: Jack Reynor
- Story by: Jack Reynor
- Starring: Will Poulter
- Release date: 13 July 2019 (Galway Film Festival)
- Running time: 18 minutes
- Country: Ireland
- Language: Irish

Bainne (Irish pronunciation: [ˈbˠan̠ʲə]; "Milk") is a 2019 Irish short film directed by Jack Reynor and starring Will Poulter. It is Reynor's directorial debut.

== Plot ==
During the waning year of the Great Irish Famine, a young, gaunt farmhand survives by tending livestock on the estate of an absent landlord. Scarcity has hardened him, as the hunger, repeated losses, and the indifference of his overseers have stripped away much of his empathy. Each morning he milks a single surviving cow, guarding the yield as his sole means of staving off death.

One pre-dawn, the farmhand notices a hooded female figure slipping into the cowshed. Convinced someone is stealing the milk, he pursues her through mist-shrouded fields. The woman moves almost silently, leaving no clear footprints, and appears untroubled by the cold. When he finally confronts her, she cups a tin vessel of milk close to her chest but does not attempt to flee. Her presence deeply unsettles him—she seems neither alive nor a spectre.

Later, while keeping watch, he discovers her again. She lingers at the cow’s flank, coaxing the animal gently while humming a lullaby in Irish. Though enraged at first, the farmhand hesitates; the woman’s emaciated appearance reminds him of his own deprivation. A storm gathers as the two share a wordless standoff. Lightning briefly illuminates her hollowed features and distant gaze, suggesting she may be a famine victim long dead.

Haunted by the encounter, the farmhand dreams of parched fields, skeletal cattle, and children crying out for sustenance. The next morning, instead of chasing her away, he allows the figure to draw milk freely. She looks to him, smiling with gratitude for his newfound kindness. As she recedes into the fog, her form blurs, leaving only a faint echo of her lullaby.

The farmhand stands in the doorway of the cowshed, the vessel of milk half full, torn between clinging to survival and an emerging sense of solidarity. Though the famine persists, he recognises the encounter rekindles a flicker of humanity: an unspoken acknowledgment that life—however fragile—carries meaning beyond possession.

== Cast ==
- Will Poulter
- Kelly Thornton
- Toni O’Rourke
- Steve Wall

== Production ==
The film was shot entirely at Reynor's home in Ireland.

== Release ==
Bainne premiered at the Galway Film Festival in Ireland on July 13, 2019.
