= Kelly Thornton =

Irish actress (born 1997)

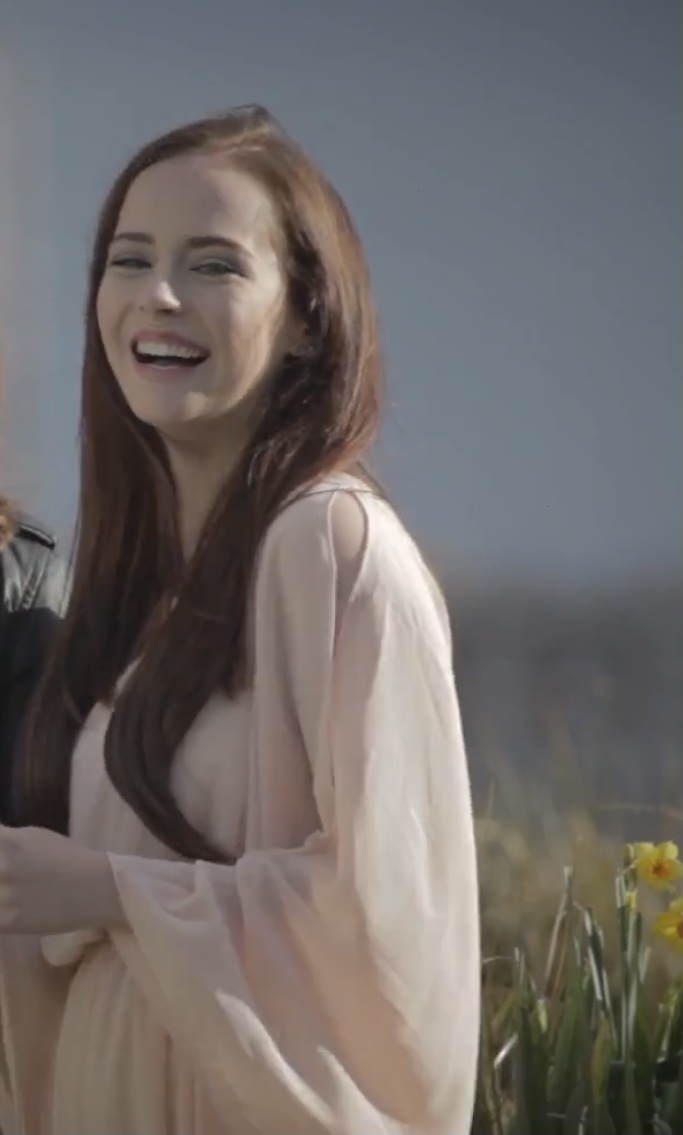
- Thornton at the 2016 Dublin International Film Festival
- Born: 13 April 1997 (age 28); Dublin, Ireland
- Occupation: Actress
- Years active: 2011–present
- Notable work: Life's a Breeze (2013); Clean Break (2015)
- Height: 5 ft 4 in (163cm)
- Awards: Bingham Ray New Talent Award (2013)

Kelly Thornton (born 13 April 1997) is an Irish actress who began her career as a child actress. She is best known for her roles as Corrina Mallon in the RTÉ drama Clean Break (2015) and Emma in the film Life's a Breeze (2013), which earned her an IFTA nomination for Best Actress.

== Early life and education ==
Thornton is from Terenure, a suburb in South Dublin and attended St Louis High School, Rathmines. She has a younger sister Robyn. She was discovered when she was 14 whilst shopping on Grafton Street with her friends by a casting director who invited her to audition.

== Career ==
Thornton made her screen debut in the 2013 Irish comedy film Life's a Breeze. She played the role of Emma, the main protagonist, alongside fellow Irish actors Pat Shortt and Fionnula Flanagan. The film was screened in the Contemporary World Cinema section at the 2013 Toronto International Film Festival. Thornton earned an IFTA nomination for her role, as well as receiving the Bingham Ray New Talent Award at the 2013 Galway Film Fleadh.

In late 2013, Thornton made her Irish television debut, featuring in the fourth series of the popular RTÉ Television drama Love/Hate, playing the part of Kellie in a single episode appearance. Her sister Robyn had a guest role in the drama. In 2015, Thornton got her biggest role to date, starring as Corrina Mallon in the four-part RTÉ drama Clean Break. The series, directed by Gillies MacKinnon and Damien O’Donnell, told the story of Frank Mallon, Corrina's father and a car dealer. Struggling to make ends meet, Frank kidnaps the family of his local bank manager and consequently finds himself involved with some notorious local criminals. A second series of the show has yet to be announced by RTÉ.

The same year, Thornton played the lead role of Molly in the Irish short film Battle. The film was written and directed by Megan K. Fox and told the story of a "teenager finding strength and happiness in music in the face of her battle with depression". This film would later be the focus of an episode of Beyond the Lens in 2016.

Thornton gained further recognition for her part in the 2016 film Sing Street, playing the role of Ann Lawlor, the older sister of the main protagonist Conor. Set in mid-1980s inner-city Dublin, Sing Street follows the story of Conor "Cosmo" Lawlor, a teenager who is forced to move schools, from a private fee-paying school to the non-fee-paying Synge Street CBS.

In October 2016, Thornton was featured in the music video for Don't Mind Me by Irish alternative rock band Walking on Cars.

Thornton has since starred in three short films: Inside I'm Racing in 2017, Jack Reynor's Bainne opposite Will Poulter and Ciarán Dooley's Twin, both in 2019.

== Filmography ==
=== Film ===
Year	Title	Role	Notes
2013	Life's a Breeze	Emma	
2015	Battle	Molly	Short film
2016	Sing Street	Ann Lawlor	
2017	Inside I'm Racing	Katie	Short film
2019	Bainne		Short film
2019	Twin	Ava	Short film
2023	Flora and Son	Heart	

=== Television ===
Year	Title	Role	Notes
2013	Love/Hate	Kellie	1 episode
2015	Clean Break	Corrina Mallon	Main cast, miniseries
2016	Beyond The Lens	Molly	1 episode

=== Music videos ===
Year	Title	Artist	Role
2016	"Don't Mind Me"	Walking on Cars	Girl
2021	Fall Into Me	Forest Blakk	Love Interest

== Awards and nominations ==
Award	Year	Category	Nominated work	Result	Ref.
Galway Film Fleadh	2013	Bingham Ray New Talent Award	Life's a Breeze	Won	
Irish Film & Television Awards	2014	Best Lead Actress - Film	Life's a Breeze	Nominated	
