= Jafaris =

Irish rapper, singer and songwriter

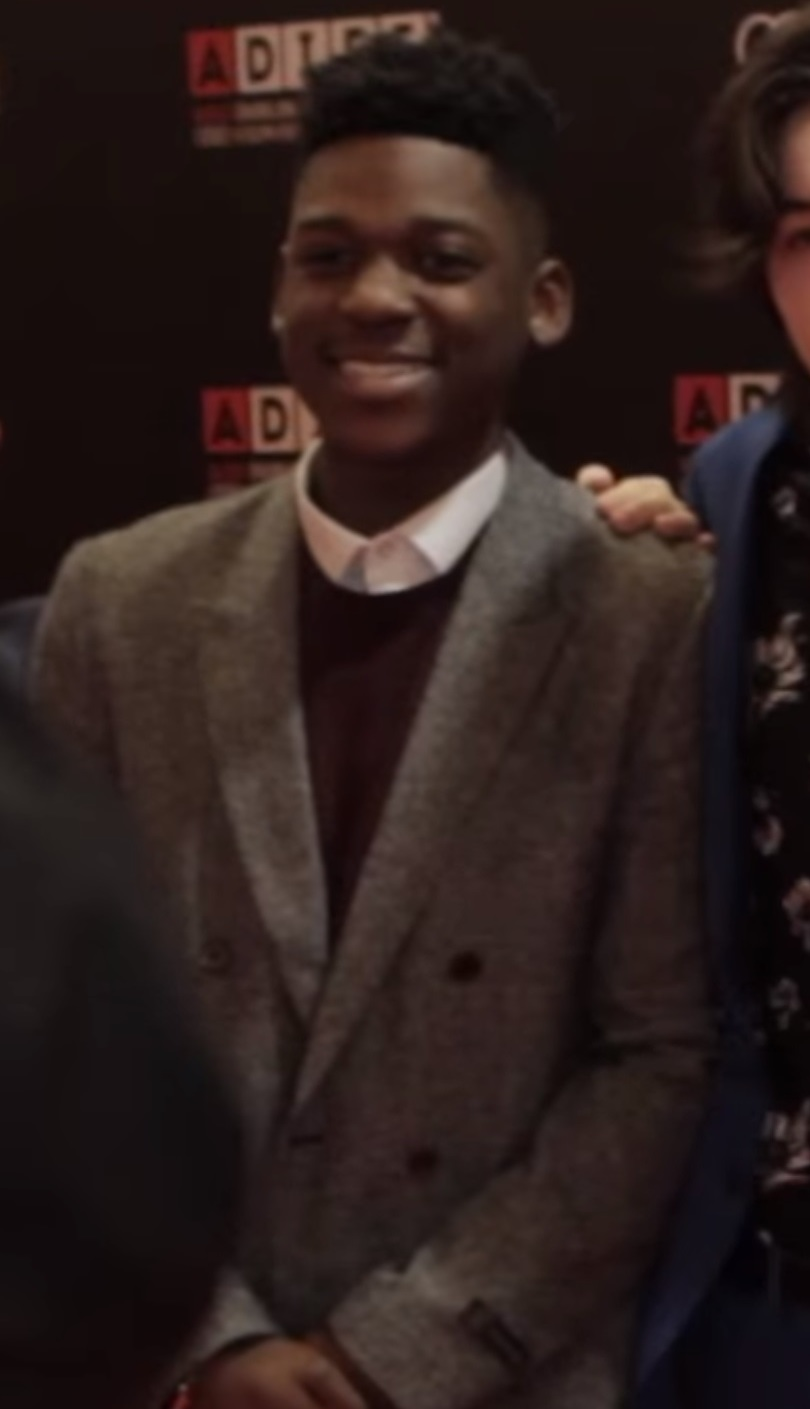
- Chamburuka at the 2016 Dublin International Film Festival

Background information
- Born: Percy Chamburuka; 19 February 1995 (age 31); Zimbabwe
- Origin: Tallaght, Dublin, Ireland
- Genres: Hip hop, Irish hip hop
- Occupations: Rapper; singer; songwriter; actor
- Years active: 2016–present
- Label: Diffusion Labs
- Website: jafarismusic.com

Percy Chamburuka (born 19 February 1995), known professionally as Jafaris, is an Irish rapper, singer and songwriter. He began his career as an actor in the comedy-drama film Sing Street (2016), before making his professional solo musical debut with the EP Velvet Cake (2017). Jafaris rose to prominence with his debut studio album Stride (2019), which was later nominated for the Choice Music Prize.

== Early life ==
Percy Chamburuka was born on 19 February 1995 in Zimbabwe. At the age of six, he moved to Tallaght, Dublin, where he was raised and attended Old Bawn Community School. He began training as a dancer at age 10 and stopped at approximately age 16 or 17. He was already "on course for a career as a dancer" when he became interested in singing and songwriting at the age of 15.

== Career ==
=== 2015–2016: Sing Street and Diffusion Lab beginnings ===
In 2015, Chamburuka began touring with Irish rap duo Hare Squead and performing under the stagename Jafaris, which he had developed through a random name generator application. It was also during this time that he began working with and through Diffusion Labs, which has been described as "a 'collaborative hub' which functions as a label and studio, and enlists writers, musicians and in-house producers." Later in 2017, Jafaris would be considered "one of its core acts". Chamburuka made his acting debut playing the role of Ngig in the musical coming-of-age comedy-drama film Sing Street (2016). The film would later be an upset nominee for the Golden Globe Award for Best Motion Picture – Musical or Comedy at the 74th Golden Globe Awards.

=== 2017–2018: Solo debut with Velvet Cake ===
Jafaris released his debut single, "Love Dies", alongside its own music video in February 2017. The song was described as a "vocal-lead cut of hazy R&B" which was "mightily impressive". On 21 April 2017, Jafaris released his debut EP Velvet Cake. To support its release, he performed at festivals such as Forbidden Fruit, and Hard Working Class Heroes. Jafaris also performed with the RTÉ National Symphony Orchestra as part of the Story of Hip Hop at Electric Picnic in 2017 and then again in 2018. He represented Ireland at the Eurosonic Festival in 2018.

=== 2019–present: Stride ===
Jafaris independently released his debut studio album, Stride, on 8 March 2019, with support from the preceding singles "Found My Feet", "Time" and "Invisible". It was well-received by local critics, and ended up being shortlisted for the Choice Music Prize which is annually awarded to the Irish Album of the Year. Jafaris featured on British singer Joy Crookes' single "Early" in October 2019. The single debut atop the UK's Asian Music Top 40 chart, before the two artists subsequently performed it on Later... with Jools Holland in November 2019. Jafaris released the singles "Glue" and "Haunted" in 2020, which supported his second EP I Love You But I'm In A Bad Mood which was released on 6 November 2020.

== Discography ==
=== Studio albums ===
List of studio albums, with release date and label shown
Title	Details	Peak chart positions
Title	Details	IRL
Stride	Released: 8 March 2019; Label: Self-released; Format: CD, LP, digital download, streaming	76

=== Extended plays ===
- Velvet Cake (2017)
- I Love You But I'm In A Bad Mood (2020)

=== Singles ===
==== As lead artist ====
Title	Year	Album
"Love Dies"	2017	Non-album single
"Found My Feet"	2018	Stride
"Time"	2019	Stride
"Invisible"	2019	Stride
"Glue"	2020	I Love You But I'm In A Bad Mood
"Haunted"	2020	I Love You But I'm In A Bad Mood

==== As featured artist ====
Title	Year	Peak chart positions	Album
Title	Year	UK Asian	Album
"Early" (Joy Crookes featuring Jafaris)	2019	1	TBA

== Filmography ==
=== Film ===
Year	Title	Role	Notes
2016	Sing Street	Ngig	
2017	One Bite	Jake Fleetwood	Short film; lead role

=== Television ===
Year	Title	Role	Notes
2019	Later... with Jools Holland	Himself	Episode dated 7 November 2019

== Awards and nominations ==
Organization	Year	Category	Nominated work	Result	Ref.
Choice Music Prize	2019	Irish Album of the Year	Stride	Nominated	
