= Sing Street =

2016 film by John Carney

- Theatrical release poster
- Directed by: John Carney
- Screenplay by: John Carney
- Story by: John Carney; Simon Carmody
- Produced by: Anthony Bregman; Martina Niland; John Carney
- Starring: Lucy Boynton; Maria Doyle Kennedy; Aidan Gillen; Jack Reynor; Kelly Thornton; Ferdia Walsh-Peelo
- Cinematography: Yaron Orbach
- Edited by: Andrew Marcus; Julian Ulrichs
- Music by: Gary Clark; John Carney
- Production companies: Likely Story; FilmWave; Distressed Films; Cosmo Films; Merced Media; PalmStar Entertainment
- Distributed by: Lionsgate (United Kingdom and Ireland); The Weinstein Company (United States)
- Release dates: 24 January 2016 (Sundance); 17 March 2016 (Ireland); 15 April 2016 (United States); 20 May 2016 (United Kingdom)
- Running time: 106 minutes
- Countries: Ireland; United Kingdom; United States
- Language: English
- Budget: $4 million
- Box office: $13.6 million

Sing Street is a 2016 coming-of-age musical comedy-drama film written and directed by John Carney from a story by Carney and Simon Carmody. Starring Lucy Boynton, Maria Doyle Kennedy, Aidan Gillen, Jack Reynor, Kelly Thornton and Ferdia Walsh-Peelo, the story revolves around a teenage boy who forms a band to impress a girl in 1980s Dublin. It is an international co-production of Ireland, the United Kingdom and the United States.

The film had its world premiere at the Sundance Film Festival on 24 January 2016. It was released in Ireland on 17 March 2016, in the United States on 15 April and in the United Kingdom on 20 May. The film received positive reviews from critics, grossed $13.6 million worldwide on a $4 million budget, and was nominated for Best Motion Picture – Musical or Comedy at the 74th Golden Globe Awards.

== Plot ==
In 1985, 15-year-old Conor Lalor lives in inner-city South Dublin with his parents, Robert and Penny, and two older siblings, Brendan and Ann. Since his parents constantly argue, Conor writes music as a way to cope with his troubled home life. Due to recent financial difficulties, Robert and Penny announce that Conor will be transferred from his private school to Synge Street, a public Christian Brothers school.

On his first day at Synge Street, Conor is reprimanded by Brother Baxter, the stern school principal, for not wearing the mandatory black shoes, despite Conor's pleas that he cannot afford new shoes. After Baxter orders him to remove his brown shoes, Conor paints the shoes black. An encounter with school bully Barry introduces Conor to Darren, a budding entrepreneur. Conor then meets and becomes smitten with Raphina, a 16-year-old aspiring model who lives across the street from the school. In an effort to impress Raphina, he decides to form a band and recruits her for a music video. Darren agrees to manage his band and introduces him to multi-instrumentalist Eamon.

They are soon joined by keyboardist Ngig, drummer Larry and bassist Garry, naming their band Sing Street. The band practises in Eamon's living room, playing covers until Brendan, a music enthusiast, encourages Conor to develop the band's own style. Conor writes original songs with Eamon, describing themselves as "futurists". Sing Street films their first music video wearing outlandish costumes; Raphina acts as ingénue and makeup artist. Conor wears makeup to school the next day, and Baxter forcibly removes it.

Raphina gives Conor the nickname "Cosmo", which she says is more in keeping with his new band's image. She tells him about her plans to leave for London soon with her older boyfriend, Evan, with whom she has an on-and-off relationship. After spending the day filming a music video for a new song, Conor and Raphina kiss. At school, he stands up to Barry.

As Conor and Raphina grow closer, he takes her out to Dalkey Island in his grandfather's motor cruiser. There, they view the car ferry leaving Dún Laoghaire for the United Kingdom. Meanwhile, Robert and Penny inform the family that they are getting legally separated and selling the house, as Penny has fallen in love with her boss and plans to move in with him, while Robert intends to get himself an apartment.

Sing Street prepares to film a Back to the Future-inspired music video for their new song in the school gym, but Conor is disheartened when Raphina fails to show up, only to find that she has left for London without telling him. A few days later, Raphina returns to Dublin, explaining to Conor that Evan abandoned her in London after they had a fight. When Raphina laments that her life now involves "hanging out with a 15-year-old schoolboy", Conor distances himself from her.

An opportunity arises for the band to play at an end-of-term dance at school. Conor offers Barry the chance to be the band's roadie and escape his abusive family. For their encore at the school dance, Sing Street performs a new song mocking bullies like Baxter while distributing homemade masks of Baxter's face to the audience. Raphina arrives as the band is playing to an excited crowd. After the dance, Conor and Raphina reconcile.

Later that night, Conor and Raphina persuade Brendan to drive them to Dalkey, so the pair can escape in the motor cruiser and travel to London, bringing with them Raphina's headshots and Conor's demo tapes and videos. Before leaving, Conor says goodbye to his sleeping mother. As the three arrive at the harbour at dawn, Conor and Brendan embrace. Conor and Raphina sail out to sea, following the ferry across the rough Irish Sea to a new life in London. Brendan watches them disappear into the distance and cheers, overjoyed that his younger brother has moved on to greater things.

== Cast ==
- Lucy Boynton as Raphina: a 16 year old aspiring model who becomes acquainted with Conor and the members of Sing Street
- Maria Doyle Kennedy as Penny: Conor, Brendan, and Ann's mother and Robert's wife
- Aidan Gillen as Robert: Conor, Brendan, and Ann's father and Penny's husband
- Jack Reynor as Brendan: Conor's older brother
- Kelly Thornton as Ann: Conor's older sister
- Ferdia Walsh-Peelo as Conor: a 15 year old Irish student at Synge Street and the band's lead vocalist and guitarist
- Ian Kenny as Barry: a student at Synge Street who bullies Conor but eventually becomes the band's roadie
- Ben Carolan as Darren: the band's manager and cameraman
- Percy Chamburuka as Ngig: the band's keyboardist
- Mark McKenna as Eamon: a multi instrumentalist and the band's guitarist
- Don Wycherley as Brother Baxter: the principal of Synge Street
- Conor Hamilton as Larry: the band's drummer
- Karl Rice as Garry: the band's bassist
- Lydia McGuinness as Miss Dunne: an art lecturer at Synge Street

== Production ==
=== Development ===
In February 2014, it was announced that John Carney would be directing the film, from a screenplay he wrote about a boy starting a band in order to impress a girl. Carney would produce through his Distressed Films banner, along with Anthony Bregman through his Likely Story Banner, Kevin Frakes for PalmStar Media, and Raj Brinder Singh for Merced Media Partners, with Paul Trijbits and Christian Grass for FilmWave. The film is a semi-autobiographical depiction of Carney's upbringing in Dublin.

=== Casting ===
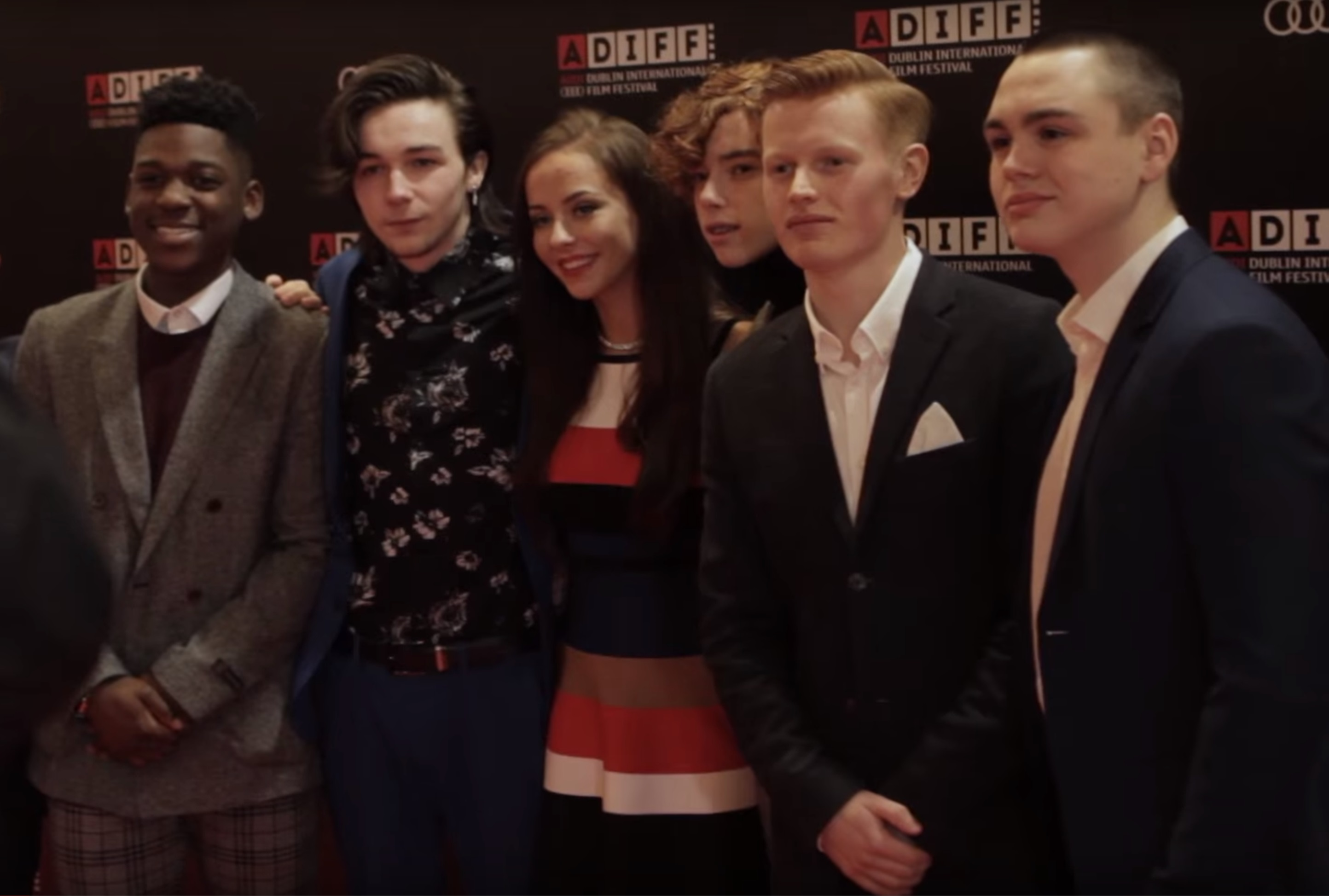
Cast of Sing Street at the 2016 Dublin International Film Festival. Left to right: Percy Chamburuka, Mark McKenna, Kelly Thornton, Ben Carolan, Ian Kenny, Conor Hamilton.

In a July 2014 interview, Carney announced he would be casting unknown actors in the film. The unknown actors turned out to be Ferdia Walsh-Peelo, Ben Carolan, Mark McKenna, Percy Chamburuka, Conor Hamilton, Karl Rice and Ian Kenny. In September 2014, it was announced that Aidan Gillen, Maria Doyle Kennedy and Jack Reynor had joined the cast of the film, portraying the role of Conor's father, mother and brother respectively.

=== Filming ===
Principal photography began in September 2014 in Dublin and concluded on 25 October 2014. Its namesake school, Synge Street CBS, was among the shooting locations for the film.

=== Music ===
Much of the original music by the band "Sing Street" was composed by Danny Wilson frontman Gary Clark, with Carney, Ken and Carl Papenfus of the band Relish, Graham Henderson and Zamo Riffman also receiving writing credits. Adam Levine co-wrote (with Carney and Glen Hansard) and sings on the track "Go Now".

The film also features music of the period from the Cure, a-ha, Duran Duran, the Clash, Hall & Oates, Spandau Ballet, the Blades and the Jam.

==== Soundtrack ====
The soundtrack album was released by Decca Records on 11 March 2016.

== Release ==
In February 2014, it was announced that FilmNation Entertainment had been selected to sell international rights to the film. In May 2014, it was announced The Weinstein Company had acquired U.S. distribution rights to the film, for $3 million.

Sing Street had its world premiere at the Sundance Film Festival on 24 January 2016. The film screened at the Dublin Film Festival on 18 February 2016, and at South by Southwest on 11 March 2016. The film was released by Lionsgate in Ireland on 17 March and in the United Kingdom on 20 May 2016. It was released in the United States on 15 April 2016.

=== Home media ===
The film was released on DVD and Blu-ray in the United Kingdom on 8 August 2016.

Limited edition 4K Ultra Blu-ray/Blu-ray combo pack and VHS are both scheduled to be released online through Lionsgate Limited on August 11, 2026.

== Reception ==
=== Box office ===
Sing Street grossed $13.6 million worldwide.

In the United States, the film made $63,573 from five theatres on its opening weekend, an average of $13,796 per venue.

=== Critical response ===
On the review aggregator website Rotten Tomatoes, the film holds an approval rating of 95% based on 214 reviews, with an average rating of 8/10. The website's critics consensus reads, "Sing Street is a feel-good musical with huge heart and irresistible optimism, and its charming cast and hummable tunes help to elevate its familiar plotting." On Metacritic, the film has a weighted average score of 79 out of 100 based on 38 critics, indicating "generally favorable" reviews. Audiences polled by PostTrak gave the film a 96% overall positive score and an 85% "definite recommend".

Guy Lodge of Variety gave the film a positive review, writing, "Perched on a tricky precipice between chippy kitchen-sink realism and lush wish-fulfilment fantasy, this mini-Commitments gets away with even its cutesiest indulgences thanks to a wholly lovable ensemble of young Irish talent and the tightest pop tunes—riffing on Duran Duran and the Cure with equal abandon and affection—any gaggle of Catholic schoolboys could hope to write themselves. Given the right marketing and word of mouth, this Weinstein Co. release could Sing a song of far more than sixpence."

In The Observer, Mark Kermode gave the film four out of five stars, writing: "When it comes to capturing the strange, romantic magic of making music, few modern film-makers are more on the money than John Carney." He added, "The bittersweet, 'happy sad' drama that follows has drawn inevitable, if misguided, comparisons with The Commitments, yet tonally this is closer to the teen spirit of Todd Graff's 2009 film Bandslam...or even Richard Linklater’s sublime School of Rock. As Carney has proved previously, he knows how to straddle the line between the sound in the room and the sound in your head – a sequence that segues from bedroom composition to living room rehearsal (with tea and biscuits) to full studio production perfectly negotiates the space between kitchen-sink realism and musical fantasy in which this lovely, lyrical movie casts its spell". Kermode concluded by saying, "Happy sad indeed. I laughed, I cried, I bought the soundtrack album."

=== Accolades ===
Award	Date of ceremony	Category	Recipient(s)	Result	Ref(s)
Austin Film Critics Association	28 December 2016	Best Film	Sing Street	10th Place	
Critics' Choice Awards	11 December 2016	Best Song	"Drive It Like You Stole It" – Gary Clark	Nominated	
Dorian Awards	26 January 2017	Unsung Film of the Year	Sing Street	Nominated	
Empire Awards	19 March 2017	Best Soundtrack	Sing Street	Nominated	
Golden Globe Awards	8 January 2017	Best Motion Picture – Musical or Comedy	Sing Street	Nominated	
Golden Tomato Awards	12 January 2017	Best Limited Release 2016	Sing Street	4th Place	
Golden Tomato Awards	12 January 2017	Best Musical/Music Movie 2016	Sing Street	2nd Place	
Houston Film Critics Society	6 January 2017	Best Original Song	"Drive It Like You Stole It" – Gary Clark	Nominated	
Irish Film & Television Awards	9 April 2016	Best Film	Sing Street	Nominated	
Irish Film & Television Awards	9 April 2016	Best Director	John Carney	Nominated	
Irish Film & Television Awards	9 April 2016	Best Script	John Carney	Nominated	
Irish Film & Television Awards	9 April 2016	Best Actor in a Supporting Role	Jack Reynor	Won	
Irish Film & Television Awards	9 April 2016	Best Original Score	Gary Clark and John Carney	Nominated	
Irish Film & Television Awards	9 April 2016	Best Sound	Robert Flanagan	Nominated	
Irish Film & Television Awards	9 April 2016	Best Costume Design	Tiziana Corvisieri	Nominated	
Irish Film & Television Awards	9 April 2016	Best Makeup & Hair	Sing Street	Nominated	
London Film Critics' Circle	22 January 2017	British/Irish Film of the Year	Sing Street	Nominated	
London Film Critics' Circle	22 January 2017	Young British/Irish Actor of the Year	Ferdia Walsh-Peelo	Nominated	
London Film Critics' Circle	22 January 2017	Technical Achievement	John Carney and Gary Clark (music)	Nominated	
National Board of Review	4 January 2017	Top 10 Independent Films	Sing Street	Won	
San Diego Film Critics Society	12 December 2016	Best Original Score	Sing Street	Won	
St. Louis Gateway Film Critics Association	18 December 2016	Best Soundtrack	Sing Street	Won	
St. Louis Gateway Film Critics Association	18 December 2016	Best Song	"Drive It Like You Stole It" – Gary Clark	Nominated	

== Stage adaptation ==
Sing Street, like Carney's film Once, was adapted for stage as a musical, also called Sing Street. The screenplay was adapted by Enda Walsh (who also wrote the book for the musical Once) and the production was directed by Rebecca Taichman. The show premiered at New York Theatre Workshop on 16 December 2019 after extensive workshops. The musical was set to premiere at the Lyceum Theatre in previews on 26 March 2020 and officially on 19 April. but it suspended its production due to the COVID-19 pandemic. Nevertheless, a cast recording featuring the original Broadway cast was released on 22 April 2020.
