= Suspects (TV series) =

- Main cast (Series 5: The Enemy Within)
- Genre: Crime fiction Police procedural
- Created by: Darren Fairhurst; Steve Hughes; Paul Marquess
- Starring: Damien Molony; Clare-Hope Ashitey; Fay Ripley; James Murray; Lenora Crichlow; Perry Fitzpatrick; Cassie Bradley
- Country of origin: United Kingdom
- Original language: English
- No. of series: 5
- No. of episodes: 23

Production
- Producers: Mary Hare; Kara Manley; Paul Marquess
- Running time: 45 minutes (approx. per episode)
- Production company: Newman Street

Original release
- Network: Channel 5
- Release: 12 February 2014 – 31 August 2016

Suspects is a British police procedural television series that aired on Channel 5 from 12 February 2014 to 31 August 2016. The series follows members of the Metropolitan Police as they investigate murders, assaults, and other crimes across London.

Most of the show's dialogue is improvised in order to make it seem natural. The actors have a detailed story document and perform from there. The show is filmed within Brownall House the former Tower Hamlets Council offices on Cambridge Heath Road, London. The building exterior also features in ITV's comedy series The Job Lot.

== Premise ==
Set in a London police station, Suspects follows DI Martha Bellamy, DS Jack Weston, and DC Charlie Steele in their investigations of crimes across London. Each episode features a different case, including murders, attempted murders, missing persons, drug overdoses, child abuse, and sex crimes. While sequential episodes do not follow a story arc – each consisting of a standalone case – cases in series two and five are split across multiple episodes. As such, episodes generally focus on the details of the case at hand rather than the private lives of the investigators.

== Cast ==
- Fay Ripley as Detective Inspector Martha Bellamy (Series 1–4)
- Damien Molony as Detective Sergeant Jack Weston
- Clare-Hope Ashitey as Detective Constable Charlotte "Charlie" Steele
- Lenora Crichlow as Detective Sergeant/Inspector Alisha Brooks (Series 5)
- Perry Fitzpatrick as Trainee/Detective Constable Gary Roscoe (Series 5)
- James Murray as Detective Chief Inspector Daniel Drummond (Series 5)
- Vauxhall Jermaine as CID James Tanner (Series 1)
- Jack Greenlees as Justin Marecroft (Series 1–2)

== Production ==
Unlike most police procedural television series, actors improvised their dialogue from scene to scene based on characterisation and a detailed plot description rather than a rehearsed script. The main cast's characterisation process included a police workshop with a retired police officer, where they learned interview techniques, police terminologies and general day-to-day lingo. Improvised dialogue and fly on the wall filming were employed to facilitate genuine character reactions and make investigations appear realistic. Shooting time was limited to two and a half days per episode, leaving only 18 minutes on average for the filming of each scene.

== Episodes ==
=== Series 1 (2014) ===
The first series, consisting of five episodes, aired from 12 February to 12 March 2014 and was subsequently released on DVD on 1 September 2014.

No. overall	No. in series	Title	Directed by	Written by	Original release date
1	1	"Alone"	John Hardwick	Claire Fryer	12 February 2014
When a toddler is reported abducted from her home, her family come under immediate suspicion.
2	2	"Calling Card"	John Hardwick	Jake Riddell	19 February 2014
The detectives unravel a complex case of assault and drug abuse at an East London nightclub.
3	3	"Hard Target"	Craig Pickles	Jake Riddell	26 February 2014
The hunt for a rapist gets complicated when his latest victim is the wife of a senior police officer.
4	4	"Sensitivity"	Craig Pickles	Jake Riddell	5 March 2014
The team investigate an apparent drug overdose of a euthanasia campaigner.
5	5	"Eyes Closed"	Craig Pickles	Claire Fryer	12 March 2014
The stabbing of a schoolgirl in a notorious London park uncovers an organised paedophile ring.

=== Series 2 (2014) ===
The second series aired from 20 August to 28 August 2014. It consists of two 2-part stories, each originally aired on consecutive days in the same week.

No. overall	No. in series	Title	Directed by	Written by	Original release date
6	1	"Nobody Else (Part One)"	Craig Pickles	Kathrine Smith	20 August 2014
The team investigate when a barrister is found bound and gagged in his own home, having been the victim of a vicious attack.
7	2	"Nobody Else (Part Two)"	Craig Pickles	Kathrine Smith	21 August 2014
When the body of a student is discovered on Crowford Common, the team realise that they have a serial attacker on their hands.
8	3	"Vigilante (Part One)"	Fiona Walton	Hilary Frankland	27 August 2014
A known vigilante who has a penchant for tracking down and exposing paedophiles is attacked and left for dead on a towpath.
9	4	"Vigilante (Part Two)"	Fiona Walton	Jack Riddell & Claire Fryer	28 August 2014
When the leader of the paedophile ring is found dead, the team realise that time is running out to find the killer.

=== Series 3 (2015) ===
The third series, consisting of four episodes, aired from 13 January to 21 January 2015.

No. overall	No. in series	Title	Directed by	Written by	Original release date
10	1	"The Artist"	Craig Pickles	Claire Fryer	13 January 2015
The team investigate the brutal attack and subsequent death of popular art teacher Abigail Lincoln at the college where she worked. Initial suspicion falls on the college caretaker, who has a conviction for stalking and assaulting a former girlfriend, and with whom Abigail had recently argued. However, it soon transpires that Abigail held information on an inappropriate relationship between a pupil and a member of staff. When headteacher Rory O'Hanlon's fingerprints are found on the weapon used to attack Abigail, it soon transpires that he was having a sexual relationship with pupil Melissa Parker. Jack also discovers O'Hanlon is connected to several unsolved murders.
11	2	"Victim"	John Hardwick	Claire Fryer & Tom Lazenby	14 January 2015
The team investigates the case of a badly burned young woman, Sian Jenkins, who is found dumped two years after she was reported missing. DNA underneath her fingernails is discovered to be that of a fellow missing person, Josie Wilson, who disappeared in 2005 at the age of eight. Jack suspects that Sian's father, Neil, may have had a part to play in her disappearance after evidence suggests that he accosted a young homeless girl, during his rounds as a charity worker. Martha, however, isn't convinced, and soon evidence suggests that Josie's father, Mike, may be the abductor, and the discovery of a baby in his cellar unravels a string of horrific events.
12	3	"Safe from Harm"	Craig Pickles	Claire Fryer	20 January 2015
The team investigate a petrol-bomb attack in which 19-year-old Asif Khan is badly injured. His father, Jamaal, has been involved in a bitter row with reprobate property developer Gregor Forrester, and old enemy of Jack and Martha's, who has so far managed to elude conviction. Fingerprint evidence suggests that a familial relative of David Eboda, Forrester's right hand-man and former ex-cop and mentor to Jack, is the personal responsible for the attack, but a full DNA profile of Forrester's son, Zak, identifies him as the culprit, and reveals that he is Eboda's son, not Forrester's. When Zak mysteriously disappears, Jack decides to press Eboda to lead him to the truth.
13	4	"Connections"	John Hardwick	Claire Fryer	21 January 2015
The body of a young girl is found naked and severely wounded on a patch of wasteground, leading Charlie to suspect the victim is Mandy Grainger, whose parents reported her missing earlier in the day. When the victim is identified as male – Jez Collins, a pre-op transgender man – the team suspect that he may have been Mandy's boyfriend. With Mandy still missing, the team discover evidence which links both victims to a house party the previous night, but when Jack interviews homeowner Emily, she denies all knowledge of the pair. When it transpires that Mandy is also in the process of change from girl to boy, the focus of the investigation soon turns towards Mandy's father.

=== Series 4 (2015) ===
The fourth series, consisting of four episodes, aired from 25 November to 16 December 2015.

No. overall	No. in series	Title	Directed by	Written by	Original release date
14	1	"AWOL"	John Hardwick	Kathrine Smith	25 November 2015
The team investigate when a father stages a protest in an attempt to persuade the army into opening a search for his missing son, who has disappeared since returning from a tour of Afghanistan. Initial suspicion falls on three of his army colleagues who he was drinking with on the night he disappeared, but when one of them is involved in a hit-and-run, the team discover that a secret affair was taking place within the confines of the regiment. With none of the suspects willing to grass on their comrades, the team lead a manhunt for a missing satellite navigation system, which could lead them to the location where they suspect the missing man's body has been buried.
15	2	"Revenge"	Sylvie Boden	Sarah-Louise Hawkins	2 December 2015
When convicted killer Dean Price is found dumped on wasteground, having been attacked in the same way as his victim, Alex Wojnar, the team realise that they may be dealing with a case of revenge. Wojnar's sister becomes the initial suspect in the attack, but when the team uncover Price's phone in his brother's house, they realise that Price may not have been guilty of murder. When DNA evidence reveals that Wojnar's sister's husband was present at the scene of his murder, family loyalties become divided, and following some frank confessions, the team soon uncover that Price's nephew may have been responsible for the attack of which his uncle was sentenced. Guest starring Joe Absolom.
16	3	"Ricochet"	Craig Pickles	Jake Riddell	9 December 2015
The team investigate when a local community leader is shot outside the boxing club which he runs for disadvantaged youths.
17	4	"Rough Justice"	John Hardwick	Jackie Malton	16 December 2015
When an elderly widow is brutally attacked in her own home on a notorious London estate, the team set out to find her attacker.

=== Series 5 (2016) ===
The fifth and final series, consisting of six episodes, aired from 3 August 2016 to 31 August 2016. Main cast member Fay Ripley was unable to reprise her role as DI Martha Bellamy due to her filming commitments for the new series of Cold Feet. Because of this, her character, Bellamy, is found dead in the first episode of the series, having been fatally shot. Three new cast members were introduced to the main cast with the initial premise of investigating her murder: Lenora Crichlow as DS Alisha Brooks, James Murray as DCI Daniel Drummond, and Perry Fitzpatrick as TDC Gary Roscoe. Unlike prior seasons, all six episodes focus on an ongoing story arc entitled The Enemy Within.

No. overall	No. in series	Title	Directed by	Written by	Original release date
18	1	"The Enemy Within (Part 1)"	Fiona Walton	Steve Baillie	3 August 2016
The murders of Martha Bellamy and her husband, Adrian, leaves Jack and Charlie devastated. A new team of officers, including DCI Daniel Drummond, DS Alisha Brooks and DC Gary Roscoe are drafted in to help with the investigation. However, it soon appears that there is more to the case than first meets the eye – leaving Jack in a compromising position and putting Charlie's safety on the line. Drummond, however, is also not as clean cut as he first makes out, agreeing to ensure evidence against one of the prime suspects in the murder, Mo Jones, is covered up in return for nothing further being mentioned about the uncompromising relationship between himself and Mo.
19	2	"The Enemy Within (Part 2)"	Craig Pickles	Jake Riddell	10 August 2016
When the girl featured in the video used to blackmail Adrian Bellamy is found washed up on the banks of the river Thames, suspicion immediately falls on Stan Turner, but he claims he has an alibi for the time of the murder. Jack is shocked to discover that Rose has a daughter, Lucy, and when Rose breaks the bombshell that Lucy is Jack's child, he is forced to re-evaluate his role in the investigation. DCI Drummond warns Stan not to get involved in any further trouble, as he will not be able to keep bailing him out. Jack and Charlie's suspicions are raised, however, when Drummond reputes them for chasing up the forensics on the gun used to shoot Martha and Adrian.
20	3	"The Enemy Within (Part 3)"	Craig Pickles	Hilary Frankland	17 August 2016
Gary and Charlie interview a young victim of rape, Kia Hopkins, who claims to have been attacked a party whilst in the company of Lucy Harris. The investigation leads Gary to the premises of an old acquaintance, Archie, whom he knew well from his days on the beat. Jack's attempt to hide the fact that Lucy is his daughter begins to irritate Charlie, forcing her to spill the beans to Drummond, who forces Jack to take a back seat. When it transpires that Kia's foster brother may have been one of the boys who raped her, Archie is left devastated. DNA evidence links local yob CJ Willis to the attack, but when CJ himself is stabbed, the investigation takes a surprising turn.
21	4	"The Enemy Within (Part 4)"	Steve Hughes	Kathrine Smith	24 August 2016
As the search for Lucy Harris gets underway, Jack is warned to distance himself from the investigation. Suspicion immediately falls on club bouncer Gus Adebayo, who is seen on CCTV arguing with Lucy just an hour before she disappeared. Meanwhile, a young man comes into the station claiming to be Lucy's boyfriend. Gary interviews the boy, and suspects he may have been the victim of sexual abuse. When his father arrives to sit in on the soft interview, Gary discovers the boy is Mo Jones' son. When the boy accuses his uncle, Stan Turner, of abuse, the team's pursuit leads them to a rooftop confrontation between Mo and Stan – which disastrously ends in tragedy.
22	5	"The Enemy Within (Part 5)"	Steve Hughes	Emma Goodwin	31 August 2016
Following an anonymous tip-off to Crimestoppers, the investigation into the eight-year-old disappearance of student Sarah Kramer is re-opened following the discovery of a body in the back garden of a residential property in East London. Gary interviews the former SIO, Ed Goddard, who claims that Sarah was a police informant and was involved in an illicit relationship with Drummond, who was her police handler. Ed's revelations further fuel his suspicions about Drummond, which leads Jack to discover that Alisha has been running an undercover operation to uncover Drummond's corrupt activities for the past few years. However, a discovery leads her into dangerous territory.
23	6	"The Enemy Within (Part 6)"	Fiona Walton	Jake Riddell	31 August 2016
As the net closes in on Drummond, Charlie uncovers CCTV footage which implicates Drummond's son Luke in the attack on Alisha. Jack and Gary find the stolen evidence bags, and forensic analysis leads to concrete proof that Drummond was involved in the burial of Sarah Kramer's body. Alisha and Jack interview Sarah's father, who is certain he was responsible for her death, but inform him that Mo Jones has lied to him for the past eight years, and that he in fact strangled her after he hit her head, which ultimately caused her death. With Mo in custody, Drummond decides to end the ordeal once and for all by giving Mo a piece of broken glass to commit suicide in his cell.

== Dutch and German remakes ==
In October 2016, it was announced that Suspects would be getting a German remake. The company UFA produced the remake for RTL Television.

In March 2017, a Dutch remake of Suspects was released in the Netherlands on Videoland, produced for RTL Netherlands.
