= WordTheatre =

Non-profit organization, founded 2003

WORDTheatre
- Industry: Theatre
- Founded: 2003
- Headquarters: Los Angeles, California, United States of America
- Products: Productions
- Members: Cedering Fox - Founder & Artistic Director; Kirsty Peart Co-Founder of WORDTheatreUK
- Website: https://wordtheatre.org

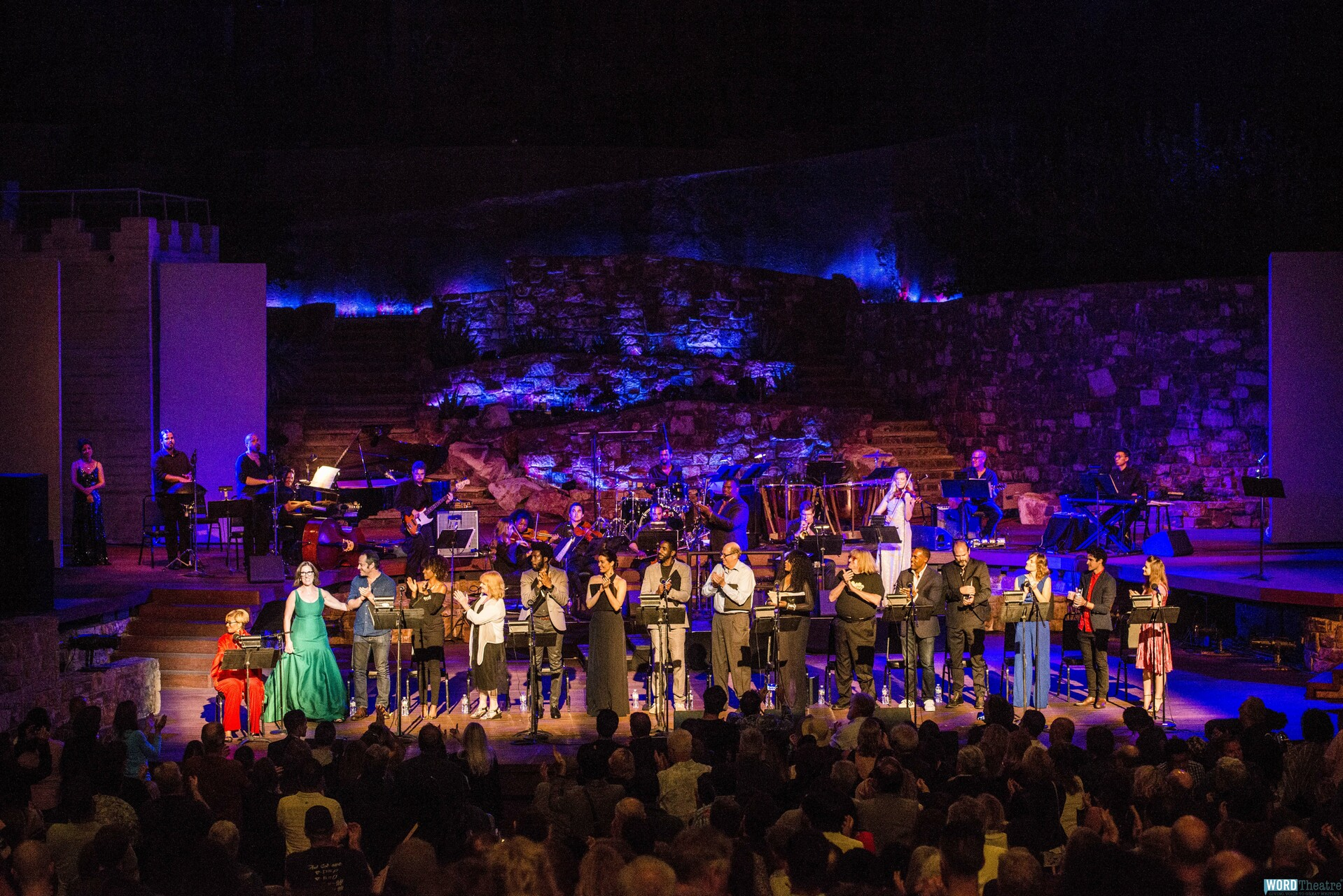

WORDTheatre is a non-profit organization founded in 2003 that champions literature by staging live readings of contemporary short stories and curating original themed productions in Los Angeles, New York, and London.

Their mission is to foster curiosity and connection through bespoke performances that entertain, enlighten and inspire.

WORDTheatreUK was recognized with charitable status by the UK Charity Commission in the fall of 2023.

== History ==
WORDTheatre was founded in 2003 by Cedering Fox, producer, theatre director, and voiceover artist who still serves as the organization's Artistic Director. Fox is the daughter of the Swedish-American award-winning poet, writer, and artist Siv Cedering. In 1989, Fox was asked to partner with Darrell Larson, on The Great Writers Series: Literary Evenings at The Met in Los Angeles. The series featured authors Sam Shepard, Peter Matthiessen, James Ellroy and actors Ed Harris, Holly Hunter and Bill Pullman, among others, and ran for three years. It was broadcasting weekly on NPR’s KCRW. The station then hired Fox to direct seven and a half hours of Isak Dinesen stories performed by an all-star cast and scored by composer Jonathan Sacks. Realizing her passion for the form, Fox launched WORDTheatre in 2003 at the Canal Club in Venice, California. Later that year, WORDTheatreUK debuted in London with co-founder and creative partner, Kirsty Peart, herself a writer of animation for film and television. Their ongoing collaboration has resulted in hundreds of bespoke productions in the US and the UK.

From 2010 to 2016 WORDTheatre was associated with the UK’s Sunday Times EFG Private Bank Short Story Award, “the world’s richest short story prize,” with performers reading the six shortlisted stories to live audiences annually in London, England. WORDTheatre also headlined the Literary Arena at the Latitude Festival for seven consecutive years. In 2013, WORDTheatre debuted its original space exploration-themed production, "In the Cosmos", with a 44-piece orchestra at Wilderness Festival, UK, which was labeled by MTV as the “Most Dynamic And Extravagant Act.” "In the Cosmos" was restaged to acclaim at The Ford Amphitheater in Los Angeles on August 26, 2017. Beginning in 2015 WORDTheatre created a show centered around the history of Jazz with James Pearson on piano which was presented at the London Jazz Festival. The show has evolved and been presented most recently to great acclaim at The Ford Amphitheater in July 2023 where it was titled Jazz Re-Evolution. In 2016 WORDTheatre performed H.G. Wells’ The Time Machine at the famous Southbank Centre in London with actors Christopher Eccleston, Emma Hamilton, and Nikki-Amuka Bird. In 2018 WORDTheatre debuted The Odyssey at Southbank Centre with Danny Sapani as Odysseus and Marianne Jean-Baptiste as Penelope. The show was based on the first female translation of The Odyssey translated by Emily Wilson and adapted by Claire Alfree. Beginning in 2020 and all throughout the pandemic WORDTheatre continued to hold events through virtual live streams, with events often being an author Q&A with a virtual performance, authors such as Richard Bausch, and Petina Gappah, Kamila Shamsie, Kit de Waal, and Guy Ware participated. Since 2021, in person events started up again in London, Los Angeles and New York to celebrate authors around the world. In 2023, WORDTheatre celebrated their 20-year anniversary with fundraisers for WORDTheatre Campus held in Los Angeles, London, and New York. Actors like Brenda Strong, Cassidy Freeman, Carla Gugino, James Cromwell, Juliet Stevenson, Ian Hart, Rhashan Stone, Michael Boatman, and Ron Perlman were among the performers with authors such as Lore Segal, David Means, Sidik Fofana, and Joyce Carol Oates in attendance.

Collaborations with MacArthur 'Genius' grant recipient John Edgar Wideman have resulted in several notable productions including 2012's 'Storytales' at the John Anson Ford Theater featuring such notable actors as Sterling K. Brown, Lorraine Toussaint, Keith David, Marla Gibbs, Brent Jennings, Omar Dorsey, and Nicki Micheaux, to name a few; and the John Edgar Wideman Experience which was staged in two different incarnations at Pittsburgh's August Wilson Theater in 2017 and the Hall of Liberty in Los Angeles in 2018. In May of 2025, selections from Wideman's oeuvre were presented at The Players in Manhattan with actors such as Chris Chalk, Carmen Ejogo and Myra Lucretia Taylor presenting his work in performance. In 2022 the work of Randall Kenan was celebrated at the Brooklyn Center for Fiction in New York. In 2024 Randall Kenan was honored again at the event Black Folk Could Fly: On the Wings of Randall Kenan held in Los Angeles.

In 2024, WORDTheatre began a dedicated Author • Actor Series in Manhattan. Sponsored by Randy & Jane Sinisi and Phiphen Studios | Post New Jersey, the series is held at The Players, a private social club in Gramercy Park. These events feature short fiction by selected authors, performed by actors such as Carla Gugino, Tim Blake Nelson, Mary Beth Peil, Lou Diamond Phillips and more. The authors are present to participate in post-performance Q&As. The next installment of this series will take place on the evening of October 15th and will feature works by authors Ben Shattuck, Peter Orner & Marisa Silver.

In September of 2024, WORDTheatre was commissioned by ALOUD, a public programming series of the Library Foundation of Los Angeles, to create a show highlighting censored literature during National Banned Books Week. WORDTheatre worked with ALOUD again in February of 2025, where they curated, cast, and presented segments from Walter Mosley’s latest novel, Been Wrong So Long It Feels Like Right in performance. Both events were held at the Mark Taper Auditorium at the Los Angeles Central Library in Downtown Los Angeles.

In April of 2024, WORDTheatre brought author George Saunders to the Moss Theater in Santa Monica, where his short fiction was brought to life by actors Alex Borstein, Eli Brown, Kimmy Shields, Jason Butler Harner & Chris Gorham. In September of 2024, WORDTheatre returned to the Moss Theater to present A WORDTheatre® Tribute to Langston Hughes: Stories, Poems, Jazz & the Blues. The evening featured a pre-performance reception with food trucks, beverages, and music, along with voter registration and information booths ahead of the 2024 Presidential Election. An abridged version of the show was performed for high school students from the LA area at The Huntington Library in San Marino, CA in March of 2025.

WORDTheatre regularly hosts readings at the William Turner Gallery at Bergamot Station, Santa Monica. In August of 2024, they presented Somos Los Angeles: Chicano Hearts featuring writers Luis J. Rodriguez, Estella Gonzalez & Daniel Olivas, and actors Richard Cabral, Diana Maria Riva & Remy Ortiz. In April of 2025, WORDTheatre presented An Evening with Ben Shattuck & His Stories, which featured Michael Provost, Jason Butler Harner, JoBeth Williams & Barrett Foa in performance of Shattuck's short fiction.

== Authors ==
Since 2003, WORDTheatre has showcased the works of contemporary short story authors. It brings to life the works of authors such as George Saunders, Jacqueline Woodson, Sidik Fofana, Marisa Silver, Charles Baxter, Brian Doyle, Ben Shattuck, TC Boyle, Tobias Wolff, Tim O'Brien, Richard Bausch, John Edgar Wideman, Pamela Painter, Percival Everett, Pam Houston, Hanif Kureishi, Hilary Mantel, Manuel Munoz, Ben Loory, Dana Johnson, Julie Orringer, Joyce Carol Oates, Ha Jin, Edith Pearlman, and Anthony Doerr to mainstream live audiences.

== Venues ==
WORDTheatre has performed in venues including the Royal Festival Hall and Queen Elizabeth Hall on South Bank, the St James Theatre, The Arts Club in London and Chatsworth House in Derbyshire; Soho House, The Geffen Playhouse, The Broad, the Grammy Museum, the Microsoft Lounge, the Ford Amphitheatre, in Los Angeles, The Center for Fiction in Brooklyn, The Players in Manhattan, and the East Hampton's Guild Hall.

WORDTheatre has also participated in festivals such as The London Literature Festival in London, the Wilderness Festival in Oxfordshire (UK), the Words and Wickets Festival at the Wormsley Cricket Grounds in High Wycombe (UK), The Latitude Festival in Suffolk (UK), and The LA Times Festival of Books in Los Angeles.

== Writer’s retreat ==
Annually WORDTheatre hosts a Writers Workshop & Retreat. For the first 10 years it was held in Edale, England (United Kingdom) and in 2022 it moved to Sommières France.

Previous leaders of the workshops were:

- 2011 Ron Carlson
- 2012 Dan Chaon
- 2013 David Means
- 2014 Andre Dubus III
- 2015 Richard Bausch
- 2016/2017 Pamela Painter
- 2018 Margaret McMullan
- 2019 Peter Orner
- 2021 Ron Carlson
- 2022 Dan Chaon
- 2023 Jill McCorkle
- 2024 Bernice McFadden
- In 2025, the workshop will be led by Pam Houston.

== Talent ==
WORDTheatre is known for performances by well-known stage, film, and television actors, including Alfred Molina, Alfre Woodard, Alex Borstein, Amanda Seyfried, Amber Tamblyn, Angela Bassett, Belinda Stewart-Wilson, Bellamy Young, Ben Miller, Bill Nighy, Bill Pullman, Brent Jennings, Brendan Fraser, Carmen Ejogo, CCH Pounder, Chris Cooper, Colman Domingo, Connie Britton, Craig T. Nelson, Christina Pickles, Damian Lewis, Damien Molony, Darren Criss, David Soul, Dohn Norwood, Ed Harris, Elisabeth Moss, Elizabeth McGovern, Emily Watson, Evanna Lynch, Forest Whitaker, Gary Dourdan, Gemma Chan, Gina Bellman, Griffin Gluck, Hannah Waddingham, Harriet Walter, Ian Hart, James Franco, Jason George, Jeff Goldblum, Jessica Capshaw, Jackson Rathbone, JK Simmons, Jing Lusi, Julianna Margulies, Juliet Stevenson, Justina Machado, Kevin McKidd, Linda Cardellini, Lou Diamond Phillips, Mark Ruffalo, Mary Beth Peil, Mayim Bialik, Minnie Driver, Maria Bello, Myra Lucretia Taylor, Rhashan Stone, Robert Pine, Olivia Williams, Sarah Paulson, Sharon Stone, Sterling K. Brown, Tony Shalhoub, Tracee Ellis Ross, Tracie Thoms, Xander Berkeley, Zachary Quinto and Zahn McClarnon.

== Charitable Works ==
In addition to championing contemporary literature through live and recorded performances, WORDTheatre brings its signature programming into underresourced schools through the program WORDTheatre Campus. The initiative consists of coordinated school visits in Los Angeles & London, and a password-protected website with recordings from live events, supplemented with educational materials. The site is offered to educators at under resourced schools for free.

Many of the same actors and authors who perform at WordTheatre's main events volunteer their time to participate in the WTC program, including JK Simmons, Bellamy Young, Toni Trucks, Jason Isaacs, Sterling K Brown, and Ryan Michelle Bathe. In 2015 WordTheatre expanded the WTIS program internationally to also include under-resourced schools in the United Kingdom.

WORDTheatre is also known for their benefit work, curating and performing original themed productions for charities such as Autism Speaks, NARSAD, the One Billion Rising movement dedicated to ending rape and violence against women, Anaphylaxis and The Parkinsons Appeal for Parkinsons disease in the UK.

WORDTheatre began staging bi-annual benefits for the Pushcart Prize, honoring literary excellence, in East Hampton, New York, in 2006.

== Membership ==
WORDTheatre is a member driven organization, with two contributing tier levels. Members of WORDTheatre receive certain perks such as discounted tickets, preferred seating at live performances, and invitations to exclusive events.

== Podcast ==
WORDTheatre releases professional recordings of stories read at their live events on their podcast, WORDTheatre Weekly. The featured author is often featured on the podcast.

== WORDTheatreUK ==
WORDTheatreUK, which gained official recognition by the UK Charity Commission in the fall of 2023, produces literary events under the artistic direction of the Cedering Fox, with creative consultation by Kirsty Peart.

WORDTheatreUK works with editor Nicholas Royle, editor of the Best British Short Stories annual collection, to select the prizewinning works that are most suited for performance. The 2024 edition of the series was held at Ladbroke Hall in Notting Hill, London, and featured stories by authors Leone Ross & Ben Tufnell, among others, performed by actors Ray Panthaki, Tallulah Greive and more. The 2025 installment will take place at the Crazy Coqs in Piccadilly on 20th September.

WORDTheatre, WORDTheatreUK’s parent company, has a longstanding relationship with Dame Harriet Walter. Walter’s 2024 book, She Speaks! What Shakespeare’s Women Might Have Said, was brought to life through WORDTheatreUK’s one-night-only, sold-out show at The Old Vic on 6 March 2025, titled Harriet Walter & Friends: What Shakespeare’s Women Might Have Said. Walter also performed in WORDTheatreUK’s original production in support of Ocean Rising of the Schmidt Ocean Institute and Nekton, The Ocean: Our Liquid Universe, which debuted at the Wilderness Festival on 3rd August, 2025.

Like WORDTheatre, WORDTheatreUK has a schools outreach program, where actors go into under resourced secondary schools and demonstrate the art of performance. Following the success of Harriet Walter & Friends, a handful of performers from the event including Leah Harvey, Olivia Williams and Harriet herself, visited the Thomas Tallis School and performed excerpts from the show, followed by participatory exercises with female-identifying students centered around finding their voice.
