= Clean Break (TV series) =

2015 Irish TV series

- Genre: Crime fiction Drama
- Written by: Billy Roche
- Directed by: Gillies MacKinnon; Damien O'Donnell
- Starring: Aidan McArdle; Damien Molony; Adam Fergus
- Composer: Adrian Corker
- Country of origin: Ireland
- Original language: English
- No. of series: 1
- No. of episodes: 4

Production
- Executive producer: John Chapman
- Producers: Emma Burge; John Chapman; James Flynn; Suzanne McAuley
- Cinematography: Peter Robertson; Anna Valdez-Hanks
- Editor: Grainne Gavigan

Original release
- Network: RTÉ One
- Release: 27 September – 18 October 2015

Clean Break is an Irish drama television series commissioned by RTÉ One and produced by Octagon Films. The four-part series premiered on 27 September 2015.

== Synopsis ==
Frank is a car dealer running out of fiscal rope. He kidnaps the local bank manager's family, which gets him into serious trouble.

== Plot ==
Frank has money troubles. The bank manager, Desmond Rane, informs him that his house, his car dealership, and a piece of land Frank and his wife had purchased with the notion of building a resort will all imminently be repossessed. Frank's wife currently lives on the Isle of Man and their daughter, Corinna will have to leave Frank and go live with her if the properties are taken away.

Working with two local criminals, Frank makes plans to kidnap Rane's daughter and wife. He also hires a local boxer, Danny Dempsey, to assist in the kidnapping by keeping everything on an even keel and making sure nobody gets hurt. Danny's initially reluctant but soon signs on.

The job goes ahead, and overall seems to work out well. Then, Rane's daughter, Jenny, recognizes Danny. The other kidnappers hear her say his name. So, they try to kill Danny, who gets shot but manages to escape and begins to seek hiding places around the town. The kidnappers take the money and set the family free.

However, a short time later everyone suspects that Danny has committed the crime. The kidnappers tell Frank that he only gets his part of the money when he brings Danny to them. Frank realizes that they might kill Danny. He also finds out that the boxer is his daughter's boyfriend. Corrina is angry that her father asked Danny to take part in the crime. She finds out where he is hiding but refuses to share this information with her father. The kidnappers however know about Corrina's and Danny's relationship and they want to use her to get to him.

In the end it turns out that the kidnapping wasn't Frank's idea, but Desmond Rane's. Frank suspects this, having seen Desmond's name in the kidnapper's contact book during a raid of the kidnapper's hideout, but he's not 100% certain. However, the bank manager kills Noel, the kidnapper who not only is the only person who knows of Rane's involvement, but also is the only one who knows where two bags of the ransom money are buried. Rane pretends to have acted in self-defence. The police find evidence that suggests Frank was the brains behind the abduction. Frank gets arrested. Danny leaves town on a trawler, and Corrina finally goes to live with her mother.

Next we see of Desmond Rane, he's calling a live hurling game. He's in possession of one bag of the ransom money. He has got away with his crime. Only his daughter knows what has really happened, but he's convinced, for now, that she won't tell anyone. He uses the money to buy a valuable and unique stamp. He gazes at his prize stamps and begins singing.

== Overview ==
The series was written by Billy Roche and directed by Gillies MacKinnon and Damien O'Donnell. The story plays in the town Wexford. The series stars Aidan McArdle, Damien Molony and Adam Fergus. Billy Roche began writing the series in 2010. The production of the series started in November 2014.

== Cast ==
- Aidan McArdle as Desmond Rane
- Damien Molony as Danny Dempsey
- Adam Fergus as Frank Mallon
- Simone Kirby as Annette Rane
- Amybeth McNulty as Jenny Rane
- Kelly Thornton as Corrina Mallon
- Ned Dennehy as Noel Blake
- Sean McGinley as Ben
- Seán Duggan as Ernie
- Marie Mullen as Mrs. Rane
- Phelim Drew as Detective Tom Burke
- Jimmy Smallhorne as Sammy

== Nominations ==
Irish Film & Television Award

- 2016: Best Drama Script (Billy Roche)

Writers Guild of Ireland: ZeBBie Awards

- 2016: Best Television Script (Billy Roche, for episode four)
