= Mick Donnellan =

Irish playwright, noir novelist, screenwriter, creative writing teacher and journalist

Mick Donnellan (born c. 1980) is an Irish playwright, noir novelist, screenwriter, creative writing teacher and journalist.

== Profile ==
Later, he established a theatre company Truman Town Theatre, whose plays are written, directed, and produced by Donnellan. Donnellan's plays for the company include Sunday Morning Coming Down, Shortcut to Hallelujah, which became known as the Ballinrobe Trilogy.

The company toured a fourth play, Velvet Revolution, which created interest in Donnellan's work among the film industry. His fifth play Radio Luxembourg was immediately optioned by London film company Dixon/ Baxi/ Evans and adapted as Tiger Raid for the screen.

== Works ==
=== Books ===
- El Niño
- Fisherman's Blues (2014)
- Mokusatsu (sequel to El Niño) (2019)

=== Plays ===
- Sunday Morning Coming Down
- Shortcut to Hallelujah
- Gun Metal Grey
- Velvet Revolution
- Radio Luxembourg

=== Screenplays/produced films ===
Tiger Raid (adapted from Radio Luxembourg) (2016)
