= GameFace =

- Title card for episode 1
- Genre: Sitcom
- Created by: Roisin Conaty
- Written by: Roisin Conaty
- Directed by: Andrew Chaplin
- Starring: Roisin Conaty; Caroline Ginty; Nina Toussaint-White; Damien Molony; Dustin Demri-Burns
- Country of origin: United Kingdom
- Original language: English
- No. of series: 2
- No. of episodes: 12 + pilot

Production
- Executive producers: Ben Farrell; Roisin Conaty
- Producer: Charlotte Lewis
- Camera setup: Single-camera
- Running time: 22 minutes
- Production company: Objective Fiction

Original release
- Network: Channel 4
- Release: 23 April 2014
- Network: E4
- Release: 12 October – 9 November 2017
- Network: Channel 4
- Release: 17 July – 14 August 2019

GameFace is a British sitcom created by, written by and starring Roisin Conaty. The pilot aired on Channel 4 on 23 April 2014. The first series began on E4 on 12 October 2017 and ended with the second series on Channel 4 on 14 August 2019. The show followed Marcella's (Conaty) life as she takes life coaching and attempts to find acting work.

== Plot ==
Marcella Donoghue is trying to make it as an actress and is generally struggling through life. She is finding it hard to get acting parts and has a string of short-term jobs which she dislikes. She cannot find love since having broken up with her boyfriend of 12 years. She is in serious debt, and is living in a house share. In the meantime she spends most of her time with her life coach – attempting to find solutions to her problems – and her driving instructor.

== Cast ==
- Roisin Conaty as Marcella
- Caroline Ginty as Caroline
- Nina Toussaint-White as Lucie
- Dylan Edwards as Billy, Marcella's brother
- Damien Molony as Jon, Marcella's driving instructor
- Dustin Demri-Burns as Simon, Marcella's ex-boyfriend
- Karl Theobald as Graham, Marcella's therapist
- Pauline McLynn as Moira, Marcella's mother
- Francis Magee as Michael, Marcella's father
- Tiff Stevenson as Tania, Simon's wife
- Alistair Green as Skinny Pig, Marcella’s brother’s friend

== Production ==
GameFace originated as a series of Channel 4's Comedy Blaps videos, titled Roisin Conaty: Onwards and Onwards. In April 2014, a full 22 minute-pilot aired on Channel 4. On 1 October 2015, GameFace was picked up by E4 for a full series of 6 episodes. On 8 June 2018, a second series of 6 episodes was announced by E4. It began broadcasting on Channel 4 on 17 July 2019.

The name Marcella was chosen for the protagonist because it is Conaty's middle name.

== Episodes ==
Series	Episodes	Originally released	
Series	Episodes	First released	Last released
1	6	12 October 2017	9 November 2017
2	6	17 July 2019	14 August 2019

=== Series 1 (2017) ===
No. overall	No. in season	Title	Directed by	Written by	Original release date
1	1	"Hero, Warrior, Fireman, Liar"	Andrew Chaplin	Roisin Conaty	12 October 2017
A boozy night has some disastrous consequences for Marcella – including a ruined children's party, a lot of missed calls from her ex-boyfriend and an unwanted houseguest.
2	2	"Wild"	Andrew Chaplin	Roisin Conaty	12 October 2017
Marcella's ex-boyfriend, Simon, re-enters her life with some startling news and further surprises arrive in the shape of his new wife, Tania.
3	3	"Onion"	Andrew Chaplin	Roisin Conaty	19 October 2017
Marcella's drug addict brother, Billy, is coming out of rehab and it is not long before their sibling squabbles start up again.
4	4	"Spider"	Andrew Chaplin	Roisin Conaty	26 October 2017
Marcella is thrilled to get a role in a film but her joy is short lived when her actions inadvertently cause the lead actress to have a meltdown. With filming cancelled she spends a giddy evening with Jon.
5	5	"Skint"	Andrew Chaplin	Roisin Conaty	2 November 2017
Marcella needs to tell her family about Billy's drug problem but cannot bring herself to dent her mother's faith in her golden boy. Finding her hot-headed father as unhinged as usual she reluctantly turns to Simon for help.
6	6	"Conch"	Andrew Chaplin	Roisin Conaty	9 November 2017
A hungover and guilt-ridden Marcella has to face a date with Jon, while haunted by flashbacks from the night before – only to be called away thanks to Billy.

=== Series 2 (2019) ===
No. overall	No. in season	Title	Directed by	Written by	Original release date
7	1	"Prank"	Andrew Chaplin	Roisin Conaty	17 July 2019
Marcella takes her driving test and goes on a date with Jon.
8	2	"Pickle"	Andrew Chaplin	Roisin Conaty	24 July 2019
Marcella deals with the fallout of her date with Jon. She meets Simon and confronts him about his wife's behaviour. Her life coach talks to her about her lack of work so she visits her agent, Pam. Marcella and Lucy are meant to be going to an awards ceremony where Cal has won an award for her work but they are worried...and is Jon ever going to call her back?
9	3	"Gritty"	Andrew Chaplin	Roisin Conaty	31 July 2019
With her friends all seemingly moving forward with their lives and relationships, Marcella begins to feel like she is being left behind, and she decides to open up to her life coach about her feelings. However, her luck is about to change when she gets news of a big audition. Meanwhile, Marcella's parents have something to tell her and Billy.
10	4	"Something About a Hat"	Andrew Chaplin	Roisin Conaty	7 August 2019
Marcella stars in a TV advert, but the part is more than she bargained for. At a session with her life coach, student Frances cross-examines Marcella on what she'll do with the advert money. Marcella celebrates her good luck with margaritas forgetting she has signed up for a creative writing class. Lucy and Caroline are going to Billy's housewarming party but Marcella says she won't go because Simon will be there...
11	5	"Strange Plants"	Andrew Chaplin	Roisin Conaty	14 August 2019
Marcella goes to stay in a country cottage to write and clear her head. She's atoning for her drunken behaviour at Billy's party. Whilst at the cottage, Marcella encounters a horse, a spider, and a surprise visitor.
12	6	"Wolf"	Andrew Chaplin	Roisin Conaty	14 August 2019
Jon invites Marcella to the art exhibition he is taking part in, where she finds out something which throws all her future plans into question. Marcella spends time with her friends Caroline, Lucy, her brother Billy, and her ex Simon, and realises that if life took her elsewhere she would miss them all.

== Reception ==
Fiona Sturges for The Guardian gave it a positive review, saying "The English standup has created a big-hearted comedy that manages to make depression and loneliness funny". Natalie Golding for Telly Binge gave it four stars saying, "E4 have clearly invested in the production, as Marcella’s surprisingly elaborate daydreams play out. Layering up her personality and backstory through throwaway comments and flashbacks, GameFace shows a sly cleverness that never gets in your face."

== Awards and nominations ==
Chortle Awards

- 2017: Best TV (nomination)

British Comedy Guide Awards

- 2017: Best New TV Sitcom (nomination)

I Talk Telly Awards

- 2017: Best New Comedy (nomination)
- 2017: Best Comedy Performance (Roisin Conaty, Award)

New York Festivals Awards

- 2017: Comedy (Bronze Award)

Royal Television Society Craft & Design Awards

- 2018: Director - Comedy Drama/Situation Comedy (Andrew Chaplin, Nomination)
- 2018: Editing - Entertainment and Comedy (Charlie Fawcett, Nomination)
