= Life's a Breeze =

2013 Irish film directed by Lance Daly

- Directed by: Lance Daly
- Written by: Lance Daly
- Produced by: Lance Daly; Macdara Kelleher
- Starring: Fionnula Flanagan; Pat Shortt
- Cinematography: Lance Daly
- Edited by: Shimmy Marcus
- Distributed by: Wildcard Distribution
- Release date: 19 July 2013
- Running time: 83 minutes
- Country: Ireland
- Language: English

Life's a Breeze is a 2013 Irish comedy film directed and written by Lance Daly. It was screened in the Contemporary World Cinema section at the 2013 Toronto International Film Festival.

== Synopsis ==
A family of middle-aged children decides to clean out years of accumulated stuff from their elderly mother's residence – without her knowledge. So, one morning, they task (by bribing) her teenage granddaughter to take the cranky old lady out for the day. Upon returning in the early evening, and after the family shows her all the new household items and furniture, and how clean the place now is, retired school teacher Nan informs them all that she had stored 50 years of savings (from pension income, renting the basement apartment, what she had previously inherited, and, as she puts it, “whatever your Dad didn’t drink”) in her mattress, amounting to almost a million euros.

Stunned, the family launches an all-out search for the mattress, which was presumably hauled away to the dump. Complications arise, and hilarity ensues.

== Cast ==
- Fionnula Flanagan as Nan
- Pat Shortt as Colm
- Eva Birthistle as Margaret
- Kelly Thornton as Emma
- Philip Judge as Michael
- Lesley Conroy as Annie
- Brian Gleeson as Hawk Man
- Barry Keoghan as Pizza Guy
