= Adam Fergus =

Irish film, television and stage actor

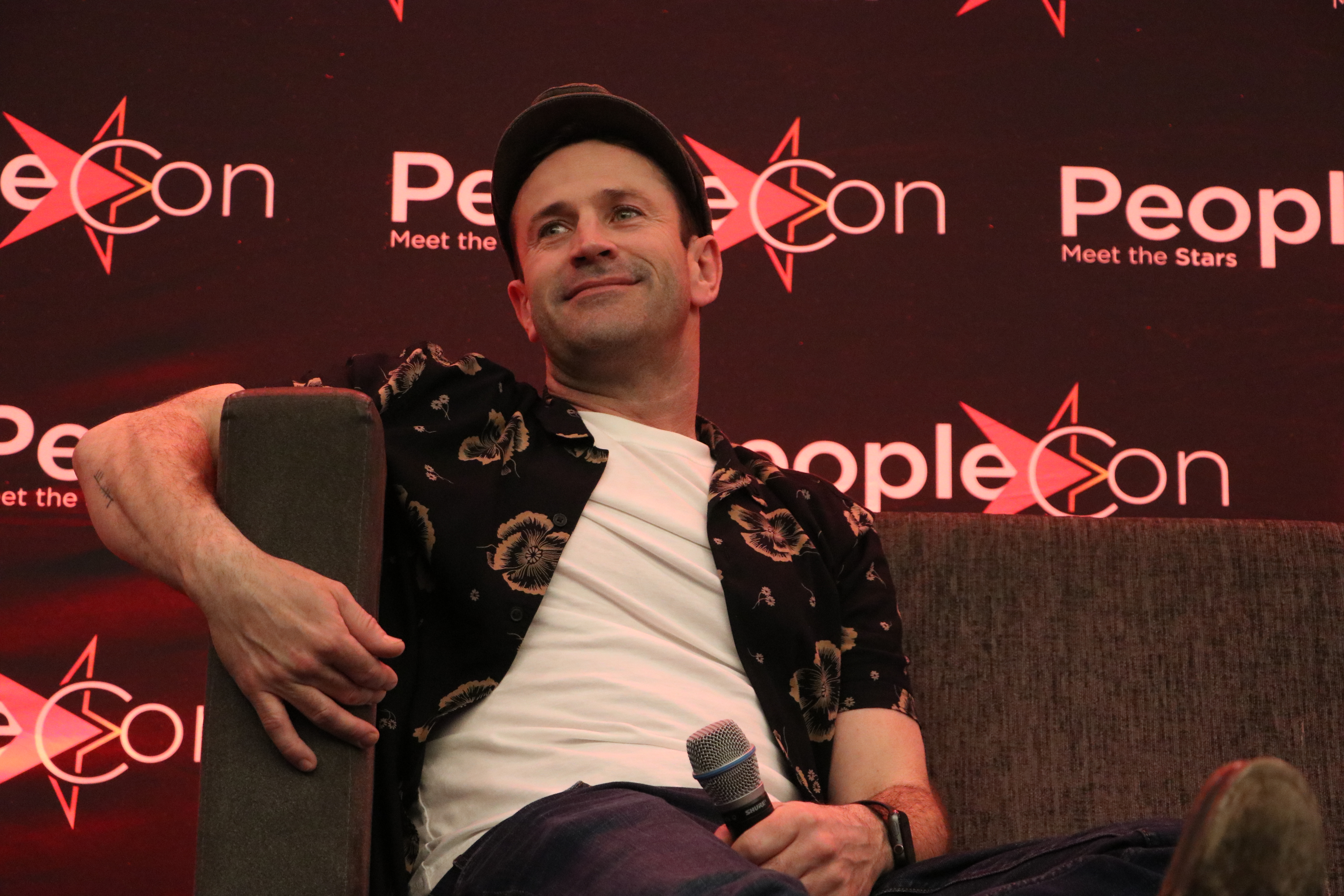
- Adam Fergus at DarkLight Con 4 by People Convention.
- Born: 24 September 1979 (age 46); Drogheda, Ireland
- Occupation: Actor
- Years active: 2004–present
- Spouse: Hayley Erin (m. 2020)
- Children: 2

Adam Fergus is an Irish actor.

== Early life ==
Born in Drogheda, Ireland on September 24, 1979, and growing up in the nearby village of Laytown, Adam is the son of a nurse and a recruitment specialist. He attended Clongowes College before going to University College Dublin, and was part of the 'Dramsoc' (Imperial College Dramatic Society). After achieving an honours degree, he then attended the Gaiety School of Acting, Dublin in 2003.

== Career ==
His film and television credits include roles in the television series Proof, The Clinic, Trouble in Paradise and Clean Break, and the films Inside I'm Dancing, Happy Ever Afters, Satellites and Meteorites, and The F Word. He had a starring role as an Irish Canadian in the Canadian comedy-drama series Being Erica. Adam began appearing on the CW series Supernatural in its twelfth season as Mick Davies, a member of the British Men of Letters.

His stage roles have included productions of Les Liaisons Dangereuses at the Gate Theatre, Dublin, The Home Place, A Midsummer Night's Dream, Great Expectations, Kilt and The Illusion.

== Personal life ==
Adam married American actress Hayley Erin in 2020, after announcing their relationship in 2019. They have twin girls together born in 2021.

== Filmography ==
Year	Film	Role	Other notes
2004	Inside I'm Dancing	Declan	
2007	Grandpa Speak to Me in Russian	Father John Creagh	
2008	Satellites & Meteorites	Daniel	
2009	Happy Ever Afters	Arthur	
2009	The Garden	Brian	(Short)
2010	A Weekend in Venice	Dave	(Short)
2012	Dublin in Pieces	Manager / Mark	
2013	What If	Rolf	also known as The F Word
2016	I.T.	Sullivan	
2019	Mama Bear	Sergeant	short film
2019	The Professor and the Madman	Alfred Minor	
2020	The Call of the Wild	James	
2020	Why Not Choose Love: A Mary Pickford Manifesto	Owen Moore	(post-production)
Year	Television series	Role	Other notes
2004	Proof	Reporter	TV series, 2 episodes
2007	Trouble in Paradise	Seamus Doogan	TV series, 2 episodes
2008	The Clinic	Robert	TV series, 2 episodes
2010-2011	Being Erica	Adam Fitzpatrick	TV series, 24 episodes
2011	XIII: The Series	Brendan	TV series, 1 episode
2013	Love/Hate	Detective Garda Ger	TV series, 3 episodes
2014	RanDumb: The Adventures of an Irish Guy in LA	Adam	(TV movie)
2015	Clean Break	Frank Mallon	TV series, 4 episodes
2015	Scandal	Prince Richard	TV series, 1 episode
2016	Her Dark Past	Marcus Crowe	(TV movie)
2016	Roots	Sir Eric Russell	TV Mini-Series, 2 episodes
2016-2017	Supernatural	Mick Davies	TV series, 6 episodes
2018	Striking Out	David King	TV series, 1 episode
2018-2024	Lykkeland	Ed Young	TV series, 23 episodes
2022	Primal	Celtics Chief (voice)	TV series, Episode: "Shadow of Fate"
2023	Haunted Harmony Mysteries: Murder in G Major	Inspector O'Reilly	(TV movie)
2023	Clean Sweep	Philip Whelan / Charlie Lynch	TV series, 6 episodes
2025	Public Domain	Sherlock Holmes (voice)	Animated pilot
