= The Hard Problem =

2015 play by Tom Stoppard

The Hard Problem is a play by Tom Stoppard, first produced in 2015. The title refers to the hard problem of consciousness, which Stoppard defines as having "subjective First Person experiences"; he notes the strangeness in the illusion of consciousness in which, clearly, you have to be conscious to experience.

== Plot ==
Hilary is a college student at Loughborough University. She discusses with her tutor, Spike, the paradoxes encountered when trying to explain human consciousness, moral sense, altruism, and parental sacrifice. Do humans act predictably, like computers, calculating risks and benefits, or do they act unpredictably, according to each person's innate sense of what is "good"? In either case, is their behavior a product of Darwinian struggle, sometimes disguised as compassion or altruism, or can it spring from the soul in a relation with God? Hilary is somewhat defiantly in the latter camp — Spike is astonished to learn that she prays each night before going to sleep.

Hilary's faith in God and her obsession with "goodness" stem from the fact that she got pregnant as a teenager and gave her baby girl Catherine up for adoption. Her prayers always have to do with ensuring that her daughter is safe and happy. Hilary feels that if she leads a morally correct life, she can make up for her previous mistakes and ensure her daughter's happiness.

Hilary applies for a job at the Krohl Institute for Brain Science. At the interview, she meets another job candidate, Amal, who seems to share Spike's view of human beings as innately self-interested. Both Hilary and Amal get hired to work at Krohl. Five years later, Amal uses a statistical model of market fluctuations to correctly predict the stock market crash of 2009. But his timing is off, which causes the Krohl companies significant losses, which, in turn, earns Amal a firestorm of invective and a major demotion from analyst to computer drudge.

Jerry Krohl, the founder of the company, has an adopted daughter named Cathy, who is about the same age that Hilary's daughter Catherine would be. This brings the "hard problem" into focus: are Catherine and Cathy the same girl, and if so, what can explain this statistically improbable coincidence? Is it purely luck, or a miracle brought about by supernatural aid (e.g. Hilary's prayers)?

Whether compassion is disguised self-interest deployed instinctively as an evolutionary strategy, or whether it can exist as unalloyed self-sacrifice, becomes a major part of the "hard problem". Hilary and her assistant Bo, a math genius, design an experiment to test this. Cathy and 95 other children at her school are tested for how much compassion each child displays toward a woman they witness supposedly being subjected to electric shocks. Bo analyzes the data and concludes that younger children show more native compassion than older children, who presumably have been taught to be comfortable with cruelty. Bo's hard work seems to show an unselfish desire to please Hilary — or is Hilary right in suspecting that Bo is sexually attracted to her, and therefore has a more selfish motive for working so hard?

Hilary goes on a business trip to Venice and is randomly assigned to room at the hotel with Spike, whom she has not seen for eight years. Again, this raises the question of whether their lives are being guided by pure chance, or some kind of providence. Spike and Hilary argue again, this time over whether inert matter can create consciousness. In bed, Hilary asks Spike to join her in praying for her daughter. But in spite of the temptation to please her, Spike remains true to his principles and refuses. He hears Hilary crying in the shower.

After returning from Venice, Hilary hosts a party to celebrate the printing of the paper she and Bo co-wrote. It's a disastrous party. Spike behaves rudely, Hilary burns the food, and Amal, now Bo's boyfriend, belittles the paper. Worse, Bo reveals to Hilary that she fudged the data to make it come out the way she knew Hilary wanted — because she (Bo) is in love with Hilary. Hilary's joy at having science "prove" that humans are natively nice is shattered. The problem of whether "goodness" is what it seems, or whether it can always be analyzed as a self-enhancing tactic, remains "hard".

Because Krohl's daughter Cathy was one of the subjects in the experiment, Hilary is able to verify that Cathy was adopted and that her birthdate as well as her name correspond to those of her daughter. Jerry has known this for some time, and in the last scene he displays his personal compassion by inviting Hilary to visit them at any time to see her daughter. Hilary is grateful but thinks such visits should be deferred until Cathy/Catherine is older. The play ends with Jerry and Cathy leaving Hilary's apartment. Hilary looks happy, and Jerry comes back to give Hilary Cathy's ID pass with her picture on it. She looks at it for a moment, then quickly stuffs her few belongings into a bag and exits.

== Productions ==
The first production was at the National Theatre, London, in 2015. It was directed by Nicholas Hytner (his last work at the National Theatre) with the following cast:

- Elaine – Kristin Atherton
- Jerry – Anthony Calf
- Cathy – Hayley Canham
- Bo – Vera Chok
- Leo – Jonathan Coy
- Julia – Rosie Hilal
- Cathy – Daisy Jacob
- Spike – Damien Molony
- Ursula – Lucy Robinson
- Amal – Parth Thakerar
- Hilary – Olivia Vinall
- Cathy – Eloise Webb

The production received mixed reviews, varying from "stimulating...rich" by Michael Billington of The Guardian and "elegantly interpreted" from The Standard's Henry Hitchings to "major disappointment" from Dominic Cavendish of The Daily Telegraph.

Philadelphia's Wilma Theater produced the US premiere in January and February 2016. The play was directed by Blanka Zizka, with the cast that featured Sarah Gliko (Hilary), Ross Beschler (Spike) and Shravan Amin (Amal).

The Midwest saw a production in 2017 at the Court Theater in Chicago. A production played Off-Broadway at the Mitzi E. Newhouse Theater in 2018.

Russian Academic Youth Theatre produced the Russian language premiere, which opened in February 2019 under the title The Problem (Russian: Проблема).
