= Roisin Conaty =

London-born Irish actor, comedian and writer (born 1979)

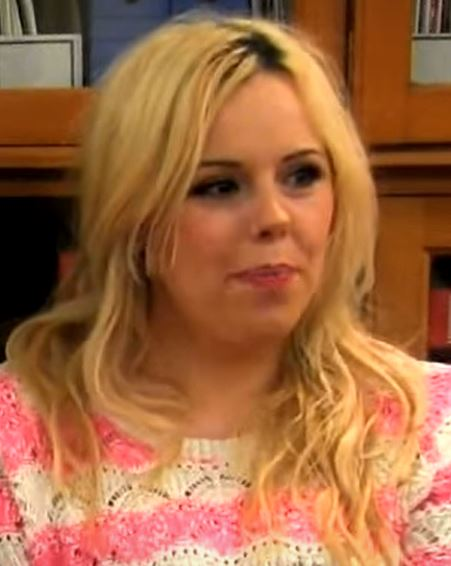
- Conaty in 2012
- Born: 25 March 1979 (age 47); Camden, London, England
- Occupations: Comedian, actress, writer
- Years active: 2004–present
- Website: roisinconaty.com

Roisin Marcella Conaty (/ˈroʊʃiːn ˈkɒnəti/ ROH-sheen KON-ə-tee; Irish: Róisín Ó Connachtaigh; born 25 March 1979) is a British and Irish comedian, actress, and writer. She won the Best Newcomer Award at the Edinburgh Festival in 2010 for her show Hero, Warrior, Fireman, Liar. She played Jo in the Channel 4 sitcom Man Down from 2013 to 2017. In early 2014, the pilot of the sitcom GameFace, of which she is the creator, writer, lead actress and executive producer, aired on Channel 4. The first full series aired in 2017 on both E4 and Hulu in the US. The second series aired on Channel 4 and Hulu in July 2019. Conaty won the Heat magazine's "Unmissables Comedian of the Year" award in 2019. She played Roxy in the first two seasons of the Netflix comedy-drama series After Life.

== Early life ==
Conaty was born in the Camden area of London, to Irish parents, and considers herself an Irish Londoner. Her mother was a nurse from Dromcolliher, County Limerick, while her father was an Aer Lingus employee from Virginia, County Cavan. She grew up in Camden with her younger sister, Siobhán, and spent summers in Ireland. She studied film at Middlesex University and had several office jobs before starting her comedy career at the age of 24.

== Career ==
=== Comedy ===
In 2010, Conaty won the Best Newcomer Award at the Edinburgh Festival for her show Hero, Warrior, Fireman, Liar. In April 2011, she performed her show at the Melbourne Comedy Festival. She followed that show up with Lifehunter in 2013.

In November 2010, she appeared on series 3, episode 4 of Russell Howard's Good News. Other stand-up performances include "The Angina Monologues", alongside Victoria Wood, Jo Brand, Andi Osho, Isy Suttie and Katy Brand for Sky Television, Russell Howard's Stand Up Central on Comedy Central and Live at the Apollo in December 2015. In 2016, she was a guest on the Jonathan Ross Show.

Conaty has appeared on a number of panel shows, including Have I Got News for You, 8 Out of 10 Cats Does Countdown, Insert Name Here, A League of Their Own, Would I Lie to You?, Hypothetical, and Room 101. She starred in the BBC Three version of Impractical Jokers.

Conaty was one of the original cast of comedians in series 1 of Taskmaster on Dave. Taskmaster creator and co-host Alex Horne when reflecting on her performance in the tasks said that she was "the worst. But also one of my favourites."

Conaty appeared on The Big Fat Quiz Of Everything broadcast on 7 January 2021 on a team with Rob Beckett.

In March 2025, she was co-host of the first series of LOL: Last One Laughing UK, alongside Jimmy Carr.

=== Acting ===
Conaty played Jo in the Channel 4 sitcom Man Down, alongside Greg Davies, from 2013 to 2017; she also appeared in Ricky Gervais's mockumentary film David Brent: Life on the Road.

In 2014, she wrote and starred in the pilot of her sitcom GameFace, in which she plays a struggling actress named Marcella. The pilot aired on Channel 4 in April 2014, following which a full series was commissioned, which premiered on E4 in October 2017. The second series debuted in July 2019.

Between 2019 and 2020, Conaty featured in the Netflix comedy-drama series After Life as Daphne / 'Roxy'.

== Selected filmography ==
| Year | Title | Role | Notes |
|---|---|---|---|
| 2011–2024 | Have I Got News for You | Herself | Panellist; 14 episodes |
| 2012–2014 | Impractical Jokers UK | Herself | 12 episodes (series 1 & 2). Also writer (2014) |
| 2013–2017 | 8 Out of 10 Cats | Herself | Panellist; 9 episodes (series 16–20) |
| 2013–2017 | Man Down | Jo | 26 episodes (series 1–4) |
| 2014 | GameFace | Marcella | Television film. Pilot for series. Also writer |
| 2014–2022 | The Great British Bake Off: An Extra Slice | Herself | 6 episodes |
| 2014–2026 | 8 Out of 10 Cats Does Countdown | Herself | Contestant; 26 episodes |
| 2015 | Taskmaster | Herself | Contestant; 6 episodes (series 1) |
| 2016 | David Brent: Life on the Road | Cat | Mockumentary comedy film |
| 2017–2019 | GameFace | Marcella | 12 episodes (series 1 & 2). Also creator, writer & exec. producer (2017) |
| 2019–2020 | After Life | Daphne / 'Roxy' | 10 episodes (series 1 & 2) |
| 2020 | Richard Osman's House of Games Night | Herself | Contestant; 5 episodes (series 1) |
| 2023 | The Cleaner | 'Her' | Episode: "The Dead End" |
| 2024 | Funny Woman | Greta | 2 episodes (series 2) |
| 2025 | Badjelly | Mudwiggle (voice) | 10 episodes |
| 2025–present | LOL: Last One Laughing UK | Herself | Co-host with Jimmy Carr; 16 episodes (series 1 & 2, HS) |
| 2026 | Zero Stars | Herself | Co-host with Sara Pascoe |
| 2026 | Death Valley | Karen Hughes | Episode: #2.2 |

| Preceded by Jonny Sweet | if.comedy award for Best Newcomer; 2010 | Succeeded by Humphrey Ker |
