= Brassic series 1 =

Brassic
- Series 1
- Starring: Joe Gilgun; Michelle Keegan; Damien Molony; Tom Hanson; Aaron Heffernan; Ryan Sampson; Parth Thakerar; Steve Evets; Ruth Sheen; Anthony Welsh; Dominic West
- No. of episodes: 6

Release
- Original network: Sky One
- Original release: 22 August – 19 September 2019

Series chronology
- Next → Series 2

The inaugural series of Sky One comedy-drama television series Brassic began broadcasting on 22 August 2019. Throughout the series, the directing credits rotated between Daniel O'Hara and Jon Wright: O'Hara directed the first three episodes whereas Wright directed the second half. The programme was created by Joe Gilgun, who also portrays the lead role of Vinnie O'Neill, and Danny Brocklehurst, who also wrote five episodes of the first series.

Brassic follows the lives of Vinnie (Gilgun) and his five friends as they live their lives in the fictional northern English town of Hawley. The working class group commit various crimes to keep money in their pockets, but as they get older some of them wonder if there's more to life away from the town. The rest of the main cast includes Michelle Keegan, Damien Molony, Tom Hanson, Aaron Heffernan, Ryan Sampson, Parth Thakerar, Steve Evets, Ruth Sheen, Anthony Welsh and Dominic West.

== Cast ==
=== Main ===
- Joe Gilgun as Vincent "Vinnie" O'Neill
- Michelle Keegan as Erin Croft
- Damien Molony as Dylan
- Tom Hanson as Leslie "Cardi" Titt
- Aaron Heffernan as Ashley "Ash" Dennings
- Ryan Sampson as Tommo
- Parth Thakerar as Jehan "JJ" Jovani
- Steve Evets as Farmer Jim
- Ruth Sheen as Kath
- Anthony Welsh as Jake
- Dominic West as Dr. Chris Coxley

=== Supporting ===
- Jude Riordan as Tyler Croft
- Archie Kelly as Shirley Paslowski
- John Weaver as Carl Slater
- Tim Dantay as Vinnie's Dad
- Joanna Higson as Sugar
- Tadhg Murphy as Gary
- Bronagh Gallagher as Carol Dennings
- Ramon Tikaram as Terence McCann
- Neil Fitzmaurice as Mr. Bishop

== Episodes ==
No. overall	No. in series	Title	Directed by	Written by	Original release date
1	1	"Episode 1"	Daniel O'Hara	Danny Brocklehurst	22 August 2019
After a day involving a cross-country car chase, a Shetland pony, a jar of chloroform and a pigeon named Nigel, Vinnie and his crew become tangled up with a local crime boss who sets out to make an example of them.
2	2	"Episode 2"	Daniel O'Hara	Danny Brocklehurst	22 August 2019
Needing cash for stripper Big Sandy's funeral, the lads decide to rob her boss's safe - but plans go awry when they get trapped in a sewer.
3	3	"Episode 3"	Daniel O'Hara	Danny Brocklehurst	29 August 2019
Ash gets challenged to a bare-knuckle fight against a rival traveller. But Vinnie suspects foul play when Ash winds up in hospital after the brawl.
4	4	"Episode 4"	Jon Wright	Danny Brocklehurst	5 September 2019
Vinnie and the lads take desperately needed money from a disgruntled woman who hires them to kill her ex-husband's prized koi carp collection, but Tommo ends up being kidnapped.
5	5	"Episode 5"	Jon Wright	Alex Ganley	12 September 2019
Vinnie's plan to carry out an audacious raid on a rival grower's weed farm is sabotaged when Erin's diabolical brother Ronnie turns up on the run from prison.
6	6	"Episode 6"	Jon Wright	Danny Brocklehurst	19 September 2019
Vinnie is horrified to discover that the boot of a car he has spontaneously nicked contains antiques stolen from McCann, who tells Vinnie to find the thief.

== Marketing ==
The series' official trailer was released by Sky One on 13 August 2019, and was shown on the network in the days prior to its premiere.

== Release ==
=== Broadcast ===
Brassic debuted on Sky One on 22 August 2019.

Internationally, the programme has been aired in France, from 16 September; Spain, from 24 September through internet streaming; Germany, from 1 January 2020 through internet streaming; Australia from 25 February 2020, Canada, Russia and the United States. In Russia, it is titled as Без гроша.

=== Home media ===
All episodes are available to be viewed through the Sky Go and Amazon Video apps. The entire boxset is also available on NOW TV and Virgin Media in the United Kingdom.

On 27 August 2019, it was announced that the complete first series would release to DVD on 30 September.

== Critical response ==
Series 1 of Brassic received generally positive reviews from critics within the United Kingdom. Creator and lead actor Joe Gilgun has been praised for his performance as Vinny O'Neill, with review aggregator website Rotten Tomatoes commented, "Joseph Gilgun is wonderfully expressive as Vinnie, his volatile features continually scrunching together and apart like the top of a drawstring bag."
