= Brassic series 2 =

Brassic
- Series 2
- Digital download cover
- Starring: Joe Gilgun; Michelle Keegan; Damien Molony; Tom Hanson; Aaron Heffernan; Ryan Sampson; Parth Thakerar; Steve Evets; Anthony Welsh; Dominic West; Ramon Tikaram; Bronagh Gallagher
- No. of episodes: 6

Release
- Original network: Sky One
- Original release: 7 May – 11 June 2020

Series chronology
- ← Previous; Series 1

The second series of Sky One comedy-drama television series Brassic began broadcasting on 7 May 2020. Joe Gilgun, Michelle Keegan, Damien Molony, Tom Hanson, Aaron Heffernan, Ryan Sampson, Parth Thakerar, Steve Evets, Anthony Welsh and Dominic West reprised their roles from the first series, while Ramon Tikaram and Bronagh Gallagher joined the main cast. The second series consisted of six episodes, which were broadcast on a weekly schedule, though all episodes were prematurely released entirely on the premiere date through the Sky television streaming service. The series concluded on 11 June 2020.

Brassic follows the lives of Vinnie (Gilgun) and his five friends who live in the fictional northern English town of Hawley. The working class group commit various crimes in order to survive, but as they get older, some of them begin to wonder whether they wouldn't be better off away from town. The second series follows up from the previous series, in which Vinnie faked his own death in order to avoid torture from "businessman" Terence McCann (Ramon Tikaram).

== Cast ==
=== Main ===
- Joe Gilgun as Vincent "Vinnie" O'Neill
- Michelle Keegan as Erin Croft
- Damien Molony as Dylan
- Tom Hanson as Leslie "Cardi" Titt
- Aaron Heffernan as Ashley "Ash" Dennings
- Ryan Sampson as Tommo
- Parth Thakerar as Jehan "JJ" Jovani
- Steve Evets as Farmer Jim
- Anthony Welsh as Jake
- Dominic West as Dr. Chris Coxley
- Ramon Tikaram as Terence McCann
- Bronagh Gallagher as Carol Dennings

=== Supporting ===
- Joanna Higson as Sugar
- Jude Riordan as Tyler Croft
- Archie Kelly as Shirley Paslowski
- Tim Dantay as Vinnie's Dad
- Claude Scott-Mitchell as Sara
- Steve Garti as Chinese Dan
- Amit Dhut as Calvin
- Tadhg Murphy as Gary
- Oliver Wellington as Aaron
- John Weaver as Carl Slater
- Neil Fitzmaurice as Mr. Bishop

== Episodes ==
No. overall	No. in series	Title	Directed by	Written by	Original release date
7	1	"The Circus"	Saul Metzstein	Danny Brocklehurst	7 May 2020
The gang try to lure Vinnie out of hiding with a new business plan – robbing the local circus.
8	2	"A Nice Day Out"	Saul Metzstein	Danny Brocklehurst	14 May 2020
After striking a deal with McCann, Vinnie is tasked with collecting someone – an apparently simple task that soon goes disastrously wrong.
9	3	"Antique Hunters"	Saul Metzstein	Danny Brocklehurst	21 May 2020
Erin attends a disastrous dinner party with Jake's family while Tommo hatches a plan to steal some erotic furniture to reinvigorate the Rat & Cutter.
10	4	"The Intruder"	Jon Wright	Alex Ganley	28 May 2020
Suffering from insomnia, Vinnie decides to have a chilled night in at the local pub, but things take a sinister turn when a stranger breaks in.
11	5	"The Festival"	Jon Wright	Danny Brocklehurst	4 June 2020
Ordered by McCann to sell all the weed they have grown, the lads decide to throw a music festival in Jim's field.
12	6	"Stealing a Wedding"	Jon Wright	Danny Brocklehurst	11 June 2020
When a close friend gets engaged, Vinnie is determined to throw them the best wedding he can muster, and so decides to steal one.

== Marketing ==
On 24 April 2020, Sky One released the second series' trailer, briefly showing the events that would occur and announcing its release date of 7 May.

== Release ==
=== Broadcast ===
The series began broadcasting on 7 May 2020. Due to the COVID-19 pandemic, the United Kingdom entered into an emergency lock-down; many journalists then urged people to watch the programme, referring to it as "an essential lockdown binge-watch".

== Critical response ==
Critics that are registered to review aggregator website Rotten Tomatoes have praised the second series, in particular for its humour and for bringing happiness in a negative time during the COVID-19 pandemic.
