= Brassic =

British television comedy drama series (2019–2025)

- Genre: Comedy drama; Crime
- Created by: Joe Gilgun; Danny Brocklehurst
- Written by: Danny Brocklehurst; Alex Ganley; Danielle Ward; Ava Pickett; Tom Melia; Laurence Rickard
- Starring: Joe Gilgun; Michelle Keegan; Damien Molony; Tom Hanson; Aaron Heffernan; Ryan Sampson; Parth Thakerar; Steve Evets; Ruth Sheen; Anthony Welsh; Dominic West; Ramon Tikaram; Bronagh Gallagher; Tadhg Murphy; India Mullen; Joanna Higson; Neil Ashton; Rachid Sabitri; Bhavna Limbachia; Muzz Khan; Camille Cottin; Dean Lennox Kelly; Darren Cahill; Rowan Robinson; Tallulah Haddon
- Opening theme: Money (That's What I Want) by Barrett Strong
- Composer: Christoph Bauschinger
- Country of origin: United Kingdom
- Original language: English
- No. of series: 7
- No. of episodes: 50 (list of episodes)

Production
- Executive producers: Danny Brocklehurst; Joe Gilgun; David Livingstone; Jon Mountague; Rebekah Wray-Rogers
- Producers: Juliet Charlesworth; Mike Noble; Jim Poyser
- Cinematography: Richard Stoddard; Alex Veitch
- Editors: Rachel Hoult; Annie Kocur
- Running time: 39–71 minutes
- Production company: Calamity Films

Original release
- Network: Sky One (series 1–2); Sky Max (series 3–7)
- Release: 22 August 2019 – 30 October 2025

Brassic is a British comedy-drama television series created by Joe Gilgun and Danny Brocklehurst for Sky One. It premiered on 22 August 2019 and concluded on 30 October 2025, after seven series consisting of 50 episodes. Starting with the third series, following the shutdown of Sky One, the show was moved to Sky Max. It is the joint longest-running scripted series on Sky alongside Trollied. Primary cast members include Gilgun, Michelle Keegan, Damien Molony, Tom Hanson, Aaron Heffernan, Ryan Sampson, Parth Thakerar, and Steve Evets.

The title is an alternative spelling of "boracic" as in boracic lint, a medical dressing, the name of which is rhyming slang for "skint" (having no money).

== Premise ==
The series follows the lives of Vinnie O'Neill and his gang of friends in the fictional English town of Hawley. The group commits various petty crimes to earn money, but as they grow older, some of them start to wonder if there is more to life outside their hometown and if they can put their criminal pasts behind them.

== Cast and characters ==
=== Main ===
- Joe Gilgun as Vincent "Vinnie" O'Neill: The emotionally intelligent and street-smart leader of a gang of amateur criminals, who struggles with mental health issues, including bipolar disorder and depression. Zack Pierce (guest series 1–4), Ben Hackett (guest series 2), and Reuven Walker (guest series 6) portray a young Vinnie during flashbacks.
- Michelle Keegan as Erin Croft: The independent and open-minded emotional core of Vinnie's gang, who seeks a better life beyond Hawley for her young son. Chloe Anais Hunt (guest series 5) portrays a young Erin during flashbacks.
- Damien Molony as Dylan Golding (series 1–4; guest series 5): Vinnie's book-smart best friend and Erin's boyfriend who acts as the gang's schemer. Joseph Riley (guest series 2), George Kent (guest series 6), and Hugh McQueen Shelley (guest series 7) portray a young Dylan during flashbacks.
- Tom Hanson as Leslie "Cardi" Titt (series 1–6; guest series 7): An insecure but kind-hearted member of Vinnie's gang who finds comfort in caring for his pet pigeon, Nigel.
- Aaron Heffernan as Ashley "Ash" Dennings: An Irish amateur boxer and the muscle of Vinnie's gang.
- Ryan Sampson as Thomas "Tommo" Schaftner: A free-spirited entrepreneur who acts as the wild card of Vinnie's gang. Alfie Corbett (guest series 5) portrays a young Tommo during flashbacks.
- Parth Thakerar as Jehan "JJ" Jovani: The owner of a motor workshop and the technical brains of Vinnie's gang.
- Steve Evets as Farmer Jim: An eccentric and ill-tempered farmer who lets Vinnie's gang grow their cannabis plants in a bunker on his farm.
- Ruth Sheen as Kath (series 1): The pub landlady of The Crows Nest that the gang frequents.
- Anthony Welsh as Jake (series 1–2): Erin's classmate and friend at college.
- Dominic West as Dr. Christopher "Chris" Coxley: Vinnie's general practitioner with whom he develops a close bond.
- Ramon Tikaram as Terence McCann (series 2–3; recurring series 1, 6; guest series 5): A local career criminal and businessman who Vinnie steals from.
- Bronagh Gallagher as Carol Dennings (series 2–6; guest series 1, 7): Ash's older sister who shows an interest in Cardi after joining Vinnie's gang.
- Tadhg Murphy as Gary Cullen (series 3–4; guest series 1–2, 5): The local undertaker who has an artificial eye and collects unique body parts from corpses.
- India Mullen as Samantha "Sam" (series 3): A barmaid who becomes close with Vinnie.
- Joanna Higson as Mary "Sugar" Jones (series 4–7; recurring series 2–3; guest series 1): A former stripper and Erin's best friend, who manages The Rat & Cutter strip club, and joins Vinnie's gang.
- Neil Ashton as David "Davey" MacDonagh (series 5–7; recurring series 4; guest series 3): A career criminal who forms a rivalry with Vinnie, hoping to take over his cannabis business.
- Rachid Sabitri as Mustaffa "Manolito" Calvo (series 5–6; guest series 4): A drug lord with an online cannabis distribution network and a collector of exotic animals.
- Bhavna Limbachia as Meena (series 5–7; guest series 4): JJ's cousin who takes over as the local undertaker and joins Vinnie's gang.
- Muzz Khan as Adyan Khan (series 5): A petty criminal who seeks out Vinnie's gang with a job proposition, and later joins them.
- Camille Cottin as Fiona Frank (series 5): A psychotherapist whom Vinnie is referred to by Dr. Coxley.
- Dean Lennox Kelly as Curtis Plum (series 6–7; guest series 5): An eccentric ratcatcher with a severe hoarding disorder hired by Vinnie's gang.
- Darren Cahill as Michael "Mick" Dennings (series 7; recurring series 6; guest series 1–3): Ash and Carol's youngest brother, who later joins Vinnie's gang.
- Rowan Robinson as Alison "Ally" (series 7): Jim's estranged daughter and the leader of Hawley's newest criminal gang.
- Tallulah Haddon as Fay (series 7): Ally's girlfriend and member of her gang.

=== Supporting ===
- Jude Riordan as Tyler Croft (series 1–6): Erin and Vinnie's young son.
- Archie Kelly as Shirley "Goldilocks" Paslowski: A Polish farmer and Jim's neighbour.
- John Weaver as Carl Slater (series 1–3, 5–7): A police officer, later detective inspector, and Vinnie's childhood arch-enemy. Oliver Akers (series 2) portrays a young Carl during flashbacks.
- Tim Dantay as Vinnie's Dad (series 1–2, 4): Vinnie's unnamed alcoholic drifter father.
- Neil Fitzmaurice as Mr. Bishop (series 1–4, 7): One of Tommo's clients who often clashes with his ex-wife Daffne.
- Debbie Rush as Daffne Bishop (series 1, 3, 5, 7): Mr. Bishop's ex-wife.
- Gerard Jordan as Niall Dennings (series 1–3, 6): One of Ash and Carol's brothers.
- Steven Hartley as Russell Hardwick (series 1, 3, 5): The rich owner of a golf course in Hawley.
- Carl Rice as Ronnie Croft (series 1–3, 5, 7): Erin's estranged ex-convict brother. Billy Winter (series 5) portrays a young Ronnie during flashbacks.
- Nikhil Parmar as Steven McCann (series 1, 3, 6): Terance's son, who tries to distance himself from his criminal father.
- Claude Scott-Mitchell as Sara (series 2): Dylan's girlfriend after he ends his relationship with Erin.
- John Thomson as Colin Popov (series 2): A struggling circus clown.
- Steve Garti as "Chinese" Dan (series 2–5, 7): A fence in Hawley.
- Amit Dhut as Calvin (series 2–5, 7): Dan's bodyguard.
- Bill Paterson as Tony Tillerton (series 2): An associate of Terence who Vinnie's gang is hired to collect.
- Oliver Wellington as Aaron (series 2): Jake's brother who takes an unhealthy interest in Erin.
- Jeff Rawle as Mr. Bates (series 2): Vinnie, Dylan, and Carl's former history teacher turned thief.
- Ed Gaughan as Gideon (series 2–3, 6): Vinnie's kind-hearted middle-aged friend.
- Hannan Ahmed as Sarim (series 2, 5–6): JJ's criminal cousin who takes part in cocaine smuggling.
- Chris Lew Kum Hoi as Hoskins (series 3): A detective partnered with Carl.
- Greg Wood as Barry MacDonagh (series 3–5): Davey's silent but intimidating brother.
- Niamh Cusack as Clodagh Dennings (series 3): Ash and Carol's aunt.
- Mark O'Halloran as Francis Dennings (series 3–5): Ash and Carol's uncle.
- Juliet Cowan as Elizabeth "Liz" Jones (series 3, 5–7): Sugar's alcoholic mother who becomes a bartender at The Crows Nest.
- Tom Bennett as Ringo (series 4, 6): Babs' husband and a guitarist in an amateur rock band.
- Mali Harries as Barbara "Babs" (series 4, 6): Ringo's temperamental and sex-crazed wife.
- Ruth Madeley as Ciara Marie (series 4–5): A self-proclaimed psychic who runs a shop in Hawley.
- Darci Shaw as Amy (series 4): A young woman who seeks out Erin, claiming to be her half-sister.
- Lee Mack as Eddie Braithwaite (series 5): The driver of a car carrier trailer who is kidnapped by Vinnie's gang.
- Samantha Power as Donna MacDonagh (series 5–6): Davey and Barry's sister who rejoins their criminal operation after she's released from prison.
- Dan Skinner as Phillip "Phil" Brilliance (series 5): A crazed ventriloquist who speaks through his puppet.
- Johann Heske as Hans Fischer (series 5–7): A German teenager who travels to England to meet Tommo, his biological father.
- Annette Badland as Rhoda Dennings (series 5): Ash and Carol's great-grandmother.
- Greg Davies as Richard "Dick" Dolphin (A Very Brassic Christmas): The owner of the Winter Wonderland tourist attraction and one of Edie's former students.
- Imelda Staunton as Edie Barnes (A Very Brassic Christmas): Dr. Coxley's elderly aunt whom Vinnie is charged with caring for over Christmas.
- Liza Tarbuck as Beatrice Ebden (series 6): Jim's ex-girlfriend, with whom he seeks to reconnect.
- Dylan Baldwin as Joey Kittens (series 6–7): A powerful cross-dressing criminal associate of the MacDonaghs and Fay's uncle.
- Elizabeth Berrington as Paloma (series 6): Cardi's mother, who disappears from Hawley for months at a time.
- Harry Taurasi as Bruno Hodge (series 7): A psychopathic former student at Vinnie, Erin, and Ronnie's school. Jacob Haw-Wells (series 7) portrays a young Bruno during flashbacks.
- Craig Kelly as Matthew "Matty" Ravenscroft (series 7): Curtis's best friend and a former DJ known as the "Wizard of E".
- Kulvinder Ghir as Farid Jovani (series 7): JJ's father, who secretly lives with a second family.

== Episodes ==
Series	Episodes	Originally released		
Series	Episodes	First released	Last released	Network
1	6	22 August 2019	19 September 2019	Sky One
2	6	7 May 2020	11 June 2020	Sky One
3	8	6 October 2021	24 November 2021	Sky Max
4	8	7 September 2022	26 October 2022	Sky Max
5	8	28 September 2023	16 November 2023	Sky Max
5	Special	21 December 2023		Sky Max
6	7	26 September 2024	7 November 2024	Sky Max
7	6	25 September 2025	30 October 2025	Sky Max

== Production ==
=== Development ===
Joseph Gilgun and Danny Brocklehurst devised a new comedy television series for Sky One, entitled Brassic, in which Gilgun would portray the lead role, whereas Brocklehurst would write the episodes' stories and scripts. After Gilgun was announced as the series lead, Michelle Keegan, Damien Molony, Tom Hanson, Aaron Heffernan, Ryan Sampson and Parth Thakerar joined the main cast. while Dominic West and Bronagh Gallagher joined in supporting roles. The first series' trailer was released by Sky One in August 2019. Brassic premiered in the United Kingdom on 22 August 2019, with the first series consisting of six episodes, broadcast weekly. Prior to the series premiere, it was renewed for a second series, with producers optimistic that it would be critically reviewed positively.

On 24 April 2020, Sky released the second series' trailer, confirming that it would begin broadcasting on 7 May that year. It was confirmed that it would also broadcast six episodes with all of them becoming available to be streamed through NOW TV from its premiere date, though would officially be broadcast on a weekly basis through Sky. Prior to series 2 commencing its broadcast, Sky recommissioned the series for an expanded third series, consisting of eight episodes.

=== Filming ===
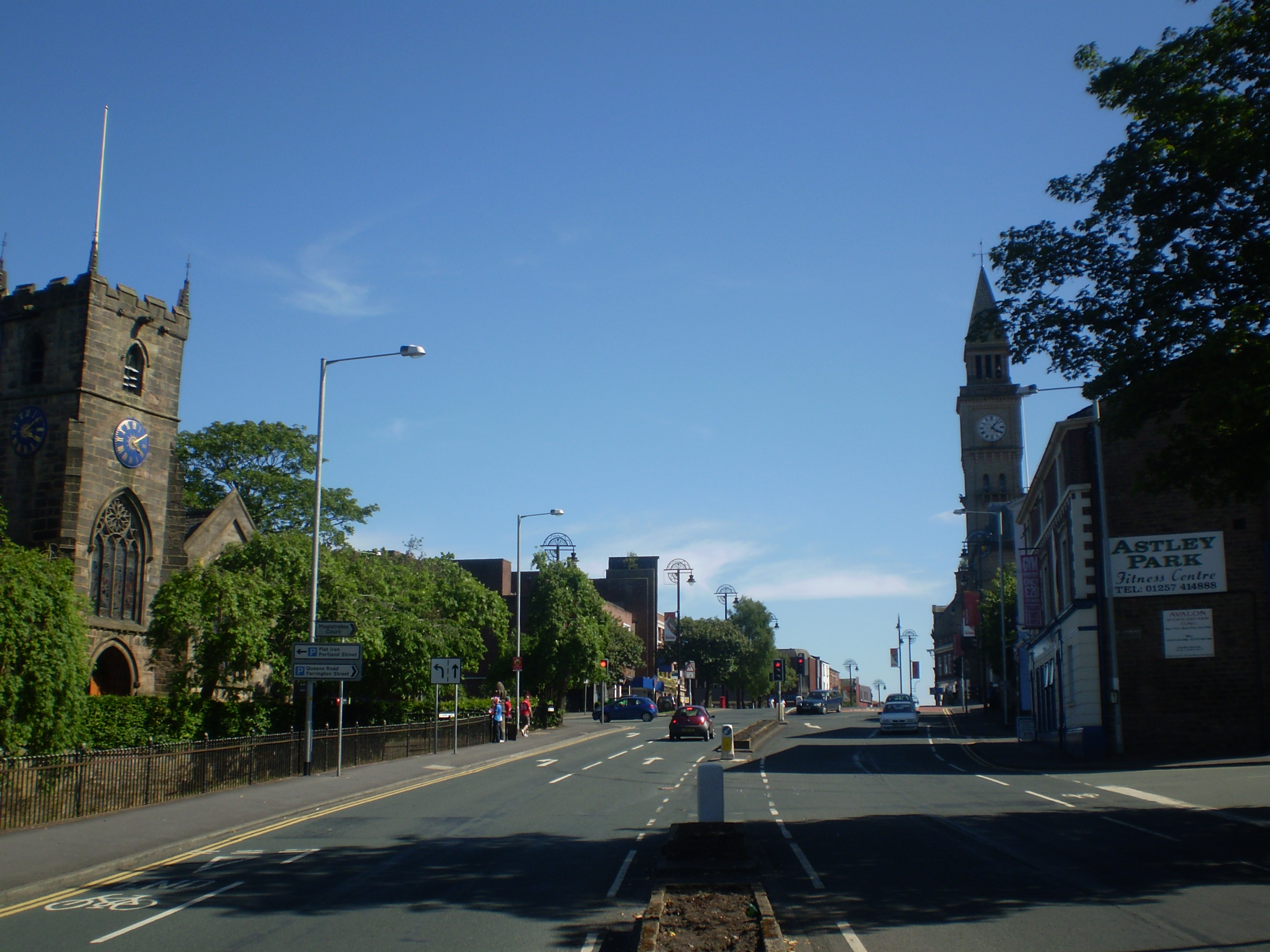
The programme's setting is based on Joe Gilgun's hometown of Chorley.

The programme is set in the fictional town of Hawley, which is inspired by Gilgun's experience of growing up in Chorley. Regarding the setting, location manager Jonathan Davies stated, "We were given the scripts and a few of us had a meeting with Joe [Gilgun] to talk through the feel and look of the show and to talk about which direction to go in. It's a very collaborative process to build a world that fits with the story and script. People want to feel like they're being transported into that real world of Brassic."

The first two series of Brassic were filmed in the Lancashire town of Bacup. Filming of the first series began in September 2018, with a fan tweeting, "As if Michelle Keegan is filming in Bacup, love her". The filming location surprised locals, as not many were informed about the programme filming there and who the cast members were, with one local stating, "There were quite a few people including myself watching and it was causing a few traffic problems as people kept stopping. Michelle Keegan was there surrounded by security guards and there was a Mercedes van ready to take her away when she was done". Further filming locations included some scenes being filmed in Bolton, the Crows Nest pub scenes are filmed in The Star and Garter public house near Manchester Piccadilly station whereas the inaugural episode's notable car-chase opening scene was shot in West Yorkshire. Yacht journey was filmed at the sea near Llandudno.

On the day of the programme's premiere, Gilgun revealed that filming for the second series had already begun prior to the first series airing, with them supposedly having a previously confidential agreement with Sky weeks before. Filming continued through the entire autumn of 2019, with all previous filming locations from series 1 continuing, and locations also expanding across the North West of England.

Gilgun revealed in an interview that the cast and crew had caused controversy during filming, when they were "kicked out" of a circus after a single day of filming, which resulted in the crew having to film the remaining scenes in a car park; Gilgun later stated that the circus were unaware of the number of cast and crew that the production team were going to bring.

== Release ==
The first series consists of six episodes and premiered on 22 August 2019.

Before the first series had aired, it was announced that the show had been renewed for a second series, which premiered on 7 May 2020.

In February 2020, the show was renewed for an expanded third series consisting of eight episodes; which premiered on 6 October 2021 having moved to Sky Max following the shutdown of Sky One.

In August 2021, the show was renewed for a fourth series, which premiered on 7 September 2022.

In August 2022, the show was renewed for a fifth series which premiered on 28 September 2023, and was followed by a Christmas special titled A Very Brassic Christmas on 21 December 2023.

In April 2023, the show was renewed for a sixth series, which premiered on 26 September 2024.

In June 2024, the show was renewed for a seventh series, making it the joint longest-running scripted series on Sky alongside Trollied. In January 2025, the show was confirmed to end with the seventh series that premiered on 25 September 2025.

=== International broadcast ===
Internationally, the show has been aired in France, from 16 September 2019; Spain, from 24 September 2019 through streaming; Germany, from 1 January 2020 through streaming; Australia from 25 February 2020, Canada, Russia and the United States. In Russia, the show is titled as Голяк.

In August 2024, the first four series were released on Netflix.

=== Home media ===
All episodes are available to be viewed through the Sky Go and Amazon Video apps. The entire series is also available on NOW TV and Virgin Media in the United Kingdom. On 31 July 2020 all episodes became available in the U.S. via Hulu.

On 27 August 2019, it was announced that the complete first series would release to DVD on 30 September.

== Reception ==
=== Critical response ===
Lucy Mangan of The Guardian, reviewing the series, gave it four out of five stars, saying: "It is a hilarious, warm, brutal melange that works because it has heart without sentimentality and authenticity without strain."

Creator and lead actor Joseph Gilgun has been praised for his performance as Vinnie O'Neill, with review aggregator website Rotten Tomatoes commenting, "Joseph Gilgun is wonderfully expressive as Vinnie, his volatile features continually scrunching together and apart like the top of a drawstring bag."

=== Accolades ===
Year	Award	Category	Nominee(s)	Result	Ref.
2019	RTS Craft & Design Awards	Costume Design - Entertainment & Non Drama	Orla Smyth-Mill	Nominated	
2019	RTS Craft & Design Awards	Picture Enhancement	Matt Brown	Won	
2020	RTS Programme Awards	Writer - Comedy	Danny Brocklehurst	Nominated	
2020	Writers' Guild of Great Britain Awards	Best TV Situation Comedy	Danny Brocklehurst	Won	
2020	Broadcasting Press Guild Awards	Best Comedy	Brassic	Nominated	
2020	TV Choice Awards	Best Comedy	Brassic	Nominated	
2020	RTS Craft & Design Awards	Design - Titles	Titles Team	Nominated	
2021	RTS Programme Awards	Comedy Series	Brassic	Nominated	
2021	RTS North West Awards	Best Performance in a Comedy	Joseph Gilgun	Won	
2021	BAFTA TV Awards	Male Performance in a Comedy Programme	Joseph Gilgun	Nominated	
2022	BAFTA TV Awards	Male Performance in a Comedy Programme	Joseph Gilgun	Nominated	
2023	RTS Programme Awards	Comedy drama Series	Brassic	Won	
2023	BAFTA TV Awards	Male Performance in a Comedy Programme	Joseph Gilgun	Nominated	
2024	BAFTA TV Awards	Male Performance in a Comedy Programme	Joseph Gilgun	Nominated	

== See also ==
- Television in the United Kingdom
