= Sorted (TV series) =

2006 British drama series

- Genre: Drama
- Written by: Danny Brocklehurst; Steve Lightfoot; Richard Stoneman
- Directed by: Iain B. MacDonald; Marc Jobst
- Starring: Neil Dudgeon; Will Mellor; Hugo Speer; Cal MacAninch; Dean Lennox Kelly; Mark Womack
- Opening theme: "Bang Bang You're Dead" by Dirty Pretty Things
- Composer: John Lunn
- Country of origin: United Kingdom
- Original language: English
- No. of series: 1
- No. of episodes: 6

Production
- Executive producer: Sally Haynes
- Producer: Steve Lightfoot
- Cinematography: Nick Dance
- Running time: 60 minutes
- Production company: BBC Studios

Original release
- Network: BBC One; BBC HD
- Release: 18 July – 22 August 2006

Sorted is a six-part BBC television drama series that follows the personal and professional lives of several postmen. It was first broadcast in 2006 on BBC One and BBC HD. The series was created by Danny Brocklehurst, whose previous credits including Clocking Off, The Stretford Wives and Shameless. The series, set in Manchester but filmed in Stockport, and stars Neil Dudgeon, Will Mellor, Hugo Speer, Cal MacAninch and Dean Lennox Kelly.

The series achieved an average of four million viewers throughout its run, and was the only BBC drama series that year that achieved stronger ratings for its final episode than its first. Despite this – and the largely good critical response – the BBC announced in October 2006 that it would not recommission the programme. The name of the series has a double meaning – postal workers 'sort' mail for delivery and "sorted" is a common British slang word for accomplishment or good order.

== Production ==
Producer Steve Lightfoot said of the series; "The warmth, wit and camaraderie of these very ordinary blokes ensures they can see each other through whatever life throws at them. It's very real, with powerful, emotional storylines which will hook viewers in to their world. The sorting office is where the boys come together at the start of every day. They're a tight knit group, but with their shift finishing in the afternoon, there's plenty of time to see what they get up to away from the Post Office. There are storylines which run through the series but each episode focuses in on one of the six."

Writer Danny Brocklehurst noted; "What this was supposed to be was very much in that Clocking Off or The Lakes kind of vein of telling stories about people who actually – other than in soaps – don't make it onto television that often. It's about ordinary, working-class lives. I wanted to tell stories with dignity and humanity and truth about ordinary people, and even though the stories are not always life and death, they are really important to those characters. I think that there's not enough of that type of telly on these days. People want to sit down at the end of the day and watch something that they see a bit of themselves in."

"It's been really refreshing [to write a series starring predominantly male characters] because you can tap into that side of you that you understand – because obviously I am a man! I've never really written blokey blokes before in this kind of way. There are thousands of postmen in the UK – they're part of everyone's lives. I interviewed a lot of postmen just to try and get a flavour of the world and to try and really understand it and how it all works. I knew nothing about this before, even though I have an uncle who's a postman, but I got told some funny little stories about things that happened; one of which made it into the show – the battle of the radios in the first episode. That's from real life."

== Cast ==
- Hugo Speer – Charlie King
- Neil Dudgeon – Harry Goodwin
- Cal MacAninch – Radge
- Dean Lennox Kelly – Dex
- Will Mellor – Barmpot
- Mark Womack – Jack
- Eva Pope – Kathy
- Nina Sosanya – Nancy
- Tracy-Ann Oberman – Amy
- Maria Doyle Kennedy – Roisin
- Josephine Butler – Abigail
- Mark Fountain – Aiden
- Julian Walsh – Hancock
- Katie Ross – Jess

== Episodes ==
No.	Title	Directed by	Written by	Original release date	UK viewers (millions)
1	"Harry's Story"	Iain B. MacDonald	Danny Brocklehurst	18 July 2006	4.19
Harry is distraught when his wife Kathy is put in a coma following a car accident. Matters are further complicated when he discovers anonymous love letters addressed to her.
2	"Radge's Story"	Iain B. MacDonald	Danny Brocklehurst	25 July 2006	3.95
Single dad Radge tries to repair his foundering relationship with his son Ryan, whose unhappiness is manifesting itself in unruly behaviour at school. When Ryan expresses a wish to move in with Uncle Phil and his boyfriend, 36-year-old Radge realises he has to be grown up enough to reopen old wounds and tell the boy the truth about his mother.
3	"Dex's Story"	Marc Jobst	Richard Stoneman	1 August 2006	4.00
Dex decides to propose to Amy after his Catholic beliefs get in the way of their living arrangements. Meanwhile, comatose Kathy's health deteriorates, as she struggles with pneumonia, and Charlie's affair comes back to haunt him, the lads learn his secret.
4	"Jack's Story"	Marc Jobst	Danny Brocklehurst	8 August 2006	3.97
Canteen-girl Nancy grows closer to Jack, offering him a place to stay when his bedsit floods, much to Barmpot's disappointment. But it soon becomes clear that the quiet newcomer has a dark past. Harry warns Charlie to stay away from Kathy, now that she is out of her coma, and decides to give his marriage another try.
5	"Charlie's Story"	Iain B. MacDonald	Steve Lightfoot	15 August 2006	4.20
Charlie resumes his affair with Kathy, but a business offer from Abigail leaves him questioning where his loyalties lie. A pool competition brings Jack closer to the group, and best man Barmpot struggles for original ideas when he is tasked with organising a wild night for Dex's stag do – that doesn't include strippers.
6	"Barmpot's Story"	Iain B. MacDonald	Danny Brocklehurst	22 August 2006	4.84
When Barmpot witnesses an armed robbery, he recognises one of the men involved and decides to speak to the police. Charlie attempts to save his marriage to Abigail, and Kathy tries to turn things around with Harry, hoping she can think of a plan to stop him leaving her for Roisin.
