= Neil Ashton =

Neil Ashton may refer to:

- Neil Ashton (actor) (born 1969), English actor
- Neil Ashton (footballer) (born 1985), English football manager and former player
