= List of Brassic episodes =

British comedy-drama

Brassic is a British comedy-drama television series, created by Joe Gilgun and Danny Brocklehurst. The first two series aired on Sky One and starting with the third series it moved to Sky Max. The first series premiered on 22 August 2019, and the seventh and final series concluded on 30 October 2025.

During the course of the series, 50 episodes of Brassic were released over seven series.

== Series overview ==
Series	Episodes	Originally released		
Series	Episodes	First released	Last released	Network
1	6	22 August 2019	19 September 2019	Sky One
2	6	7 May 2020	11 June 2020	Sky One
3	8	6 October 2021	24 November 2021	Sky Max
4	8	7 September 2022	26 October 2022	Sky Max
5	8	28 September 2023	16 November 2023	Sky Max
5	Special	21 December 2023		Sky Max
6	7	26 September 2024	7 November 2024	Sky Max
7	6	25 September 2025	30 October 2025	Sky Max

== Episodes ==
=== Series 1 (2019) ===
No. overall	No. in series	Title	Directed by	Written by	Original release date
1	1	"Episode 1"	Daniel O'Hara	Danny Brocklehurst	22 August 2019
2	2	"Episode 2"	Daniel O'Hara	Danny Brocklehurst	22 August 2019
3	3	"Episode 3"	Daniel O'Hara	Danny Brocklehurst	29 August 2019
4	4	"Episode 4"	Jon Wright	Danny Brocklehurst	5 September 2019
5	5	"Episode 5"	Jon Wright	Alex Ganley	12 September 2019
6	6	"Episode 6"	Jon Wright	Danny Brocklehurst	19 September 2019

=== Series 2 (2020) ===
No. overall	No. in series	Title	Directed by	Written by	Original release date
7	1	"The Circus"	Saul Metzstein	Danny Brocklehurst	7 May 2020
8	2	"A Nice Day Out"	Saul Metzstein	Danny Brocklehurst	14 May 2020
9	3	"Antique Hunters"	Saul Metzstein	Danny Brocklehurst	21 May 2020
10	4	"The Intruder"	Jon Wright	Alex Ganley	28 May 2020
11	5	"The Festival"	Jon Wright	Danny Brocklehurst	4 June 2020
12	6	"Stealing a Wedding"	Jon Wright	Danny Brocklehurst	11 June 2020

=== Series 3 (2021) ===
No. overall	No. in series	Title	Directed by	Written by	Original release date
13	1	"The Great Bull Semen Heist"	Melanie Ann Oliver	Danny Brocklehurst	6 October 2021
14	2	"Gideon's Mum's Funeral"	Melanie Ann Oliver	Danny Brocklehurst	13 October 2021
15	3	"The Ransom"	Melanie Ann Oliver	Alex Ganley	20 October 2021
16	4	"Classic Cars"	Melanie Ann Oliver	Danny Brocklehurst	27 October 2021
17	5	"Parenthood"	George Kane	Danny Brocklehurst	3 November 2021
18	6	"The Keithy Problem"	George Kane	Alex Ganley	10 November 2021
19	7	"Bees"	George Kane	Danielle Ward	17 November 2021
20	8	"The Shack"	George Kane	Danny Brocklehurst	24 November 2021

=== Series 4 (2022) ===
No. overall	No. in series	Title	Directed by	Written by	Original release date
21	1	"Getting There"	John Hardwick	Danny Brocklehurst	7 September 2022
22	2	"Day at the Dogs"	John Hardwick	Danny Brocklehurst	14 September 2022
23	3	"Lost in the Woods"	John Hardwick	Alex Ganley	21 September 2022
24	4	"Exotic Zoo"	John Hardwick	Danny Brocklehurst	28 September 2022
25	5	"Amy"	Richard Stoddard	Danielle Ward	5 October 2022
26	6	"Saint Erin (Murder Mystery)"	Richard Stoddard	Danielle Ward	12 October 2022
27	7	"An Unexpected Guest"	Richard Stoddard	Alex Ganley	19 October 2022
28	8	"Davey's House"	Richard Stoddard	Danny Brocklehurst	26 October 2022

=== Series 5 (2023) ===
No. overall	No. in series	Title	Directed by	Written by	Original release date
29	1	"Eddie"	Richard Stoddard	Danny Brocklehurst	28 September 2023
30	2	"Missing Body"	Richard Stoddard	Danny Brocklehurst	5 October 2023
31	3	"Hans"	Richard Stoddard	Danny Brocklehurst	12 October 2023
32	4	"Sweet Sixteen"	Richard Stoddard	Ava Pickett	19 October 2023
33	5	"Ratcatcher"	Ruth Carney	Danielle Ward	26 October 2023
34	6	"Caravan of Courage"	Ruth Carney	Alex Ganley	2 November 2023
35	7	"Albert"	Ruth Carney	Alex Ganley	9 November 2023
36	8	"The Manolito Problem"	Ruth Carney	Danny Brocklehurst	16 November 2023
Special
37	–	"A Very Brassic Christmas"	John Hardwick	Danny Brocklehurst	21 December 2023

=== Series 6 (2024) ===
No. overall	No. in series	Title	Directed by	Written by	Original release date
38	1	"Stolen FA Cup"	Ben Gregor	Danny Brocklehurst	26 September 2024
39	2	"That Night"	Ben Gregor	Alex Ganley	3 October 2024
40	3	"Blast from the Past"	Ben Gregor	Danny Brocklehurst	10 October 2024
41	4	"Naked Cult"	Richard Signy	Tom Melia	17 October 2024
42	5	"Heartbreak"	Richard Signy	Ava Pickett	24 October 2024
43	6	"The Mark"	Richard Signy	Danny Brocklehurst; Danielle Ward	31 October 2024
44	7	"Two Funerals and a Wedding"	Richard Signy	Danny Brocklehurst	7 November 2024

=== Series 7 (2025) ===
No. overall	No. in series	Title	Directed by	Written by	Original release date
45	1	"The Bishops"	Jordan Hogg	Danny Brocklehurst	25 September 2025
46	2	"Once Upon a Time in Düsseldorf"	Leon Lopez	Danny Brocklehurst	2 October 2025
47	3	"Skool Reunion"	Jordan Hogg	Ava Pickett	9 October 2025
48	4	"The Wizard of E"	Leon Lopez	Danny Brocklehurst	16 October 2025
49	5	"Halloween Heist"	Theresa Varga	Laurence Rickard	23 October 2025
50	6	"The Carvery"	Theresa Varga	Danny Brocklehurst	30 October 2025
