= Reckoning (TV series) =

Australian produced television series

- Genre: Drama; Thriller; Crime
- Created by: David Hubbard
- Written by: David Hubbard; David Eick; Thompson Evans; Katrina Cabrera Ortega; Ryan Mottesheard
- Directed by: Shawn Seet; Peter Andrikidis; Jennifer Leacey
- Starring: Sam Trammell; Aden Young; Simone Kessell; Laura Gordon; Gloria Garayua; Jacqueline McKenzie; Mitzi Ruhlmann; Toby Schmitz
- Composer: Roger Mason
- Countries of origin: Australia; United States
- Original language: English
- No. of seasons: 1
- No. of episodes: 10

Production
- Executive producers: David Eick; David Hubbard; David Maher; David Taylor
- Producers: Ryan Mottesheard; Diane Haddon
- Production location: Australia
- Cinematography: Bruce Young
- Editor: Nicole La Macchia
- Running time: 42 minutes
- Production companies: Playmaker Media; 2 Wise Men Productions

Original release
- Release: 1 October 2019

Reckoning is an Australian crime thriller television limited series developed for Sony Pictures Television Networks' AXN. It received a direct-to-series order of 10 episodes on 2 May 2018. Production started in early July 2018.

== Premise ==
When a teenager goes missing and a serial killer is suspected after five years of being dormant, two fathers find themselves set on a course of mutual destruction that threatens to consume every part of their quiet, suburban community.

== Cast ==
=== Main ===
- Sam Trammell as Leo Doyle
- Aden Young as Detective Sergeant Mike Serrato
- Simone Kessell as Paige Serrato
- Laura Gordon as Candace Doyle
- Gloria Garayua as Detective Cyd Ramos
- Jacqueline McKenzie as Linda Swain
- Mitzi Ruhlmann as Amanda Serrato
- Toby Schmitz as John Ainsworth

=== Recurring ===
- Milly Alcock as Sam Serrato
- Ed Oxenbould as Paxton Doyle
- Finn Little as Jake Serrato
- Anthony Phelan as Dr. Arlon Doyle
- Diana Glenn as Tori McGrath
- Robert Mammone as Chief Randy Sosa
- Paula Arundell as Sheriff Woller
- Di Smith as Dotty Doyle
- Sean Barker as Edgar Harris
- Nic English as Brad
- Claude Scott-Mitchell as Gretchen McGrath
- Kasia Stelmach as Iris Swan
- Eduardo Santos as Officer Clifton
- Andrea Demetriades as Valerie
- Ritchie Singer as Dr Chaudhary
- John Batchelor as Detective Purcell
- Lani Tupu as Dr Horatio Cabrera
- Josh Quong Tart as Dr Hartman

== Production ==
While the series' story takes place in Northern California, shooting and post-production were done in Sydney, New South Wales, Australia through incentives offered by the Made in NSW International Footloose Fund. The drama was produced by Playmaker Media, an Australian leader in premium scripted content. Sony Pictures Television Distribution handled worldwide sales of the series, with international release via the AXN pay channel.

== Release ==
The series was released on the Netflix streaming service on 1 May 2020.

== Reception ==
Film critic John Serba, questioned the originality of the show saying "It just doesn't offer enough original fodder to lure us into a 10-episode binge." Serba concludes his review describing how "the premise is too contrived and the characters too familiar to render it more than just another rote serial killer story."
