= Os (Fringe) =

- Fringe episode
- Episode no.: Season 3 Episode 16
- Directed by: Brad Anderson
- Written by: Josh Singer; Graham Roland
- Production code: 3X6116
- Original air date: March 11, 2011

Guest appearances
- Alan Ruck as Dr. Crick; Jorge Garcia as Kevin; Jeff Sanca as Koenig; Tom Stevens as Michael Crick; Greyston Holt as Vince; Nelson Wong as Scott Watts

Episode chronology
← Previous "Subject 13"	Next → "Stowaway"
- Fringe season 3

"Os" is the 16th episode of the third season of the American science fiction drama television series Fringe, and the 59th episode overall. The episode centered on the Fringe team's investigation into a series of robberies of the element osmium, which they connect to a scientist (Alan Ruck) who is able to defy the laws of physics.

"Os" was written by Josh Singer and Graham Roland, while Brad Anderson served as director. Along with Ruck, the episode also guest-starred Jorge Garcia in a brief cameo as a security guard.

When the episode first aired in the United States on March 11, 2011, it drew an estimated audience of 3.76 million viewers and earned a 1.5/5 rating among adults aged 18 to 49. Reviews were largely favourable, with several critics praising Ruck's casting as a scientist whose only goal is to help his son.

== Plot ==
The Fringe team is called to the scene of a robbery of a metal depository; the body of one of the thieves, shot by a security guard, inexplicably floats off the ground, while a second culprit has gotten away. They find that the thief has taken off with a supply of osmium, one of the densest elements, and an autopsy later reveals that the dead thief's body is filled with the metal. Tracking a security card on the body, they enter a warehouse where they find the second culprit, dead, along with the bodies of several more people, all of them paraplegic. Walter (John Noble) notes that the physical properties of osmium (both gravitational and thermal) have been reversed, and by melting the osmium collected from the first victim using liquid nitrogen, they detect the presence of the rarer element lutetium, typically only present in meteorites.

Recognizing that the local science museum has a display of meteorites, the Fringe team is able to secure Dr. Crick (Alan Ruck), the man behind the osmium injections, and another paraplegic who has taken Dr. Crick's injections as they attempt to steal the display. With Dr. Crick in custody, Walter learns that the man had worked in aerospace to find an alloy for fighter craft. He happened upon the combination of the osmium-lutetium alloy that generated a material lighter than air, and sought to refine a permanent solution to give his own paraplegic son the ability to walk, having promised the same to those that had died from earlier, lethal doses of the alloy.

Walter, who has lamented to Nina Sharp (Blair Brown) his need to have William Bell (Leonard Nimoy) back to make himself whole, realizes that the only reason the osmium-lutetium alloy became lighter than air was due to his own transgression into the parallel universe that has started to break down the laws of reality. To reverse those effects, Walter intends to use the idea of "soul magnets", microscopic devices that can be ingested by a person to call forth the soul of another. Walter believes Bell had arranged for someone in the prime universe to be his vessel, and rings the bell that Bell had bequeathed to Nina, believing it to be the instrument that will activate the soul magnets and call forth Bell.

Simultaneously, Peter (Joshua Jackson) has decided to open up to Olivia (Anna Torv) and shows her the five data discs from the shapeshifters he killed after the doomsday device weaponized him. As he discusses it with her, Olivia hears the sound of the bell. She turns to face Peter, revealing herself to now be possessed by Bell.

== Production ==
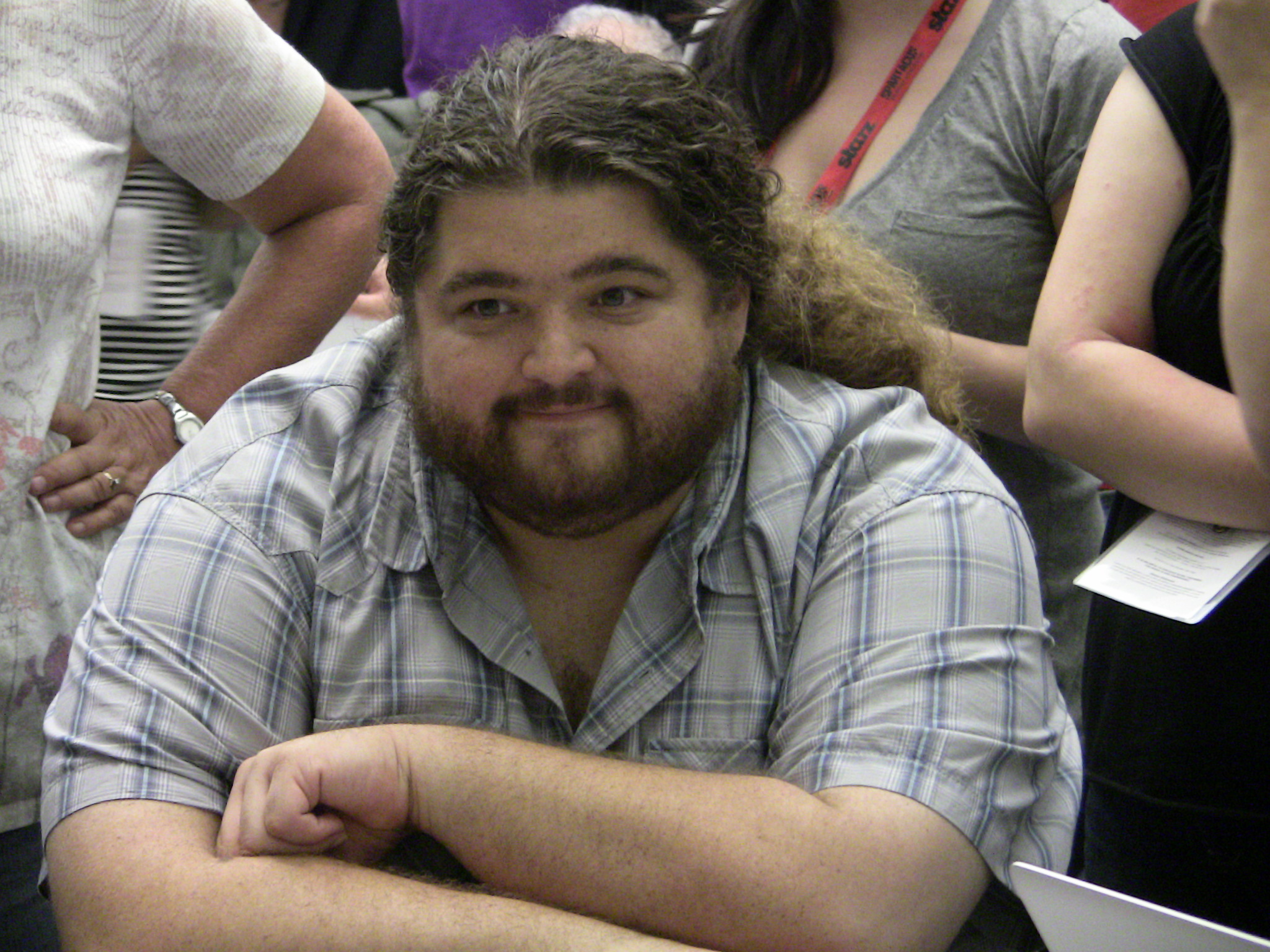
Jorge Garcia, known for his character Hugo "Hurley" Reyes in Lost, made a cameo appearance in "Os".

The episode was co-written by co-executive producer Josh Singer and executive story editor Graham Roland, while former Fringe producer Brad Anderson directed it.

The return of the William Bell character to the series was inspired by Leonard Nimoy from earlier seasons. In his first appearance on Fringe in the first season finale, "There's More Than One of Everything", Nimoy requested that a bell be placed on his desk so that his character would be able to ring it as a play on the character's name. When the writers considered how to bring Bell back for the third season, they recalled this mannerism, and wrote it into the larger mythos, being the means by which Bell's mind emerged from Olivia's at the end of this episode.

On March 3, Entertainment Weekly reported that actor Jorge Garcia would be making a cameo appearance in an upcoming Fringe episode. Garcia, who previously starred as Hugo "Hurley" Reyes from J.J. Abrams' Lost, appears as a Massive Dynamic guard that is smoking a bong with Walter at the start of the episode. Alan Ruck guests as Dr. Crick, the person behind the floating bodies. Ruck was approached by the show's producers having envisioned him for the role. Ruck described the character, "He is no dummy... and he stumbled on to something and he is trying to figure out a way to use it. Ultimately he would like to use it for good, but in so doing he causes a lot of damage. So I guess you can say he's obsessed. And this particular point in time where the episode of Fringe starts, time is fleeting and he's just... under the gun." On his character's possible reappearance, Ruck commented, "I think not... Technically yes [he could come back], but probably not."

As with other Fringe episodes, Fox released a science lesson plan in collaboration with Science Olympiad for grade school children, focusing on the science seen in "Os", with the intention of having "students learn about meteorites and ways of finding them."

== Reception ==
=== Ratings ===
On its first broadcast, "Os" maintained a 1.5/5 rating share for adults between the ages of 18 and 49 as with several previous episodes, with an estimated 3.76 million viewers. In the 18–49 demographic, Fringe was the second most watched show in its time slot, after CSI: NY. Time shifted viewing increased the episode's ratings among adults by 53 percent to a 2.3 ratings share. This was the largest increase in time shifting viewing for the week among network shows.

=== Reviews ===
Reviews of the episode were generally positive. Ken Tucker from Entertainment Weekly praised guest actor Alan Ruck's "sustained, understated" performance, and also called Olivia being revealed as Bell's vessel "a clever development," especially praising actress Anna Torv's imitation of Nimoy's voice rather than "doing the obvious thing and hav[ing] her lip-synch Nimoy reading the lines." The A.V. Club's Emily VanDerWerff graded the episode with a B−, explaining that unlike Tucker, she thought the idea of "soul magnets" was "just so goofy that it's almost too much for me to handle". VanDerWerff also felt there wasn't much of a connection between the episode and the ongoing storyline "until the show tries to force one in a way that doesn't feel as elegant as the show usually makes this stuff feel". She did however praise Ruck as "well-cast," and wrote the episode "very nearly managed" to parallel Walter's "desperate measures to the desperate measures of other men also trying to save themselves or their children through science," which the reviewer considered the strongest asset of the show.

"There are a lot of great ideas, and there are a lot of terrible ones, but the show's consistent, rock solid execution keeps it from embarrassing itself too much. It's only as I sit down to write about it now that I realize how dangerously close this episode came to being utterly ridiculous. And to a degree, that's what's so great about Fringe this season: It walks the line between perfect and ridiculous so well and walks it with such a straight face that it almost deserves points just for trying."

— The A.V. Club critic Emily VanDerWerff

Writing for the Los Angeles Times, critic Andrew Hanson referred to audiences' Friday night plans away from television when he commented the episode was "better than any movie you're going to see in the theater right now". Hanson thought the mystery produced "surprises around every corner". IGN's Ramsey Isler rated the episode 8.0/10, explaining he enjoyed the "classic Fringe" opening scene, the "decent [acting] job" by Ruck, and John Noble's performance; he also thought the script was "very clever [as] it reveals surprising story elements with innovative tricks". Isler wasn't sure what to make of the Bell-Olivia plot twist however, commenting that "this new William Bell thing is either going to end up as the best plot device of the season, or the cheesiest thing in recent sci-fi history".

Billy Grifter from Den of Geek was slightly disappointed with the "mad scientist" storyline as he felt it had been done before, but found several redeeming qualities: Alan Ruck's performance and the last five minutes featuring Noble and Blair Brown, and Torv with Joshua Jackson. Grifter thought the Noble-Brown scene was "actually very funny," praising the two actors' performances, and added that this humor made the following Torv-Jackson scene's impact "even greater". Referring to Torv's "passable" Nimoy impression, Grifter concluded that "the strength of Fringe is that it can take a rather light and fluffy premise, like the one in "Os", and embellish it with wonderful character moments and a genuine surprise or two".
