= Stowaway (Fringe) =

- Fringe episode
- Episode no.: Season 3 Episode 17
- Directed by: Charles Beeson
- Story by: Akiva Goldsman; Jeff Pinkner; J. H. Wyman
- Teleplay by: Danielle Dispaltro
- Production code: 3X6117
- Original air date: March 18, 2011

Guest appearances
- Nicholas Carella as Jim; Paula Malcomson as Dana Gray; Seth Gabel as Lincoln Lee; Jason Poulsen as Brian; Catherine Lough Haggquist as Lucy

Episode chronology
← Previous "Os"	Next → "Bloodline"
- Fringe season 3

"Stowaway" is the 17th episode of the third season of the American science fiction drama television series Fringe, and the 60th episode overall. It followed the Fringe team's investigation into a woman, Dana Gray (Paula Malcomson), who repeatedly but unsuccessfully tries to commit suicide. Meanwhile, Olivia continues to serve as the host for William Bell, to the dismay of most of her other team members.

The episode's story was written by Akiva Goldsman, Jeff Pinkner, and J. H. Wyman, while Danielle Dispaltro contributed its teleplay. Charles Beeson served as the director. Along with Malcomson, "Stowaway" featured a guest appearance by previous Fringe actor Seth Gabel. Though Leonard Nimoy had recently retired, the writers still had storylines involving his character, leading to their decision to have Bell possess Olivia's body.

"Stowaway" first aired in the United States on March 18, 2011 to an estimated 3.8 million viewers and a 1.3 ratings share for adults aged between 18 and 49. This was the series' lowest ratings share for adults up to that point. Reviews of the episode were generally positive, as multiple critics praised Anna Torv's Nimoy impression as well as Joshua Jackson's reaction to it.

== Plot ==
Following from "Os", Olivia's (Anna Torv) body has been possessed by William Bell. Though he promises that no harm will come to Olivia while he seeks a suitable host for his mind, Broyles (Lance Reddick) demands that Bell leave Olivia in 48 hours. Bell begins searching local hospitals for a host.

They are alerted to eyewitness accounts of a woman who, after jumping with another man from a high roof and crashing onto a taxi parked below, simply walked away. As the Fringe team investigates, they are approached by another FBI agent, Lincoln Lee (Seth Gabel), who identifies the woman as Dana Gray (Paula Malcomson). Dana, who had been struck by lightning twice, was killed eighteen months earlier along with her family during a robbery of their home, but she apparently was able to walk away from the morgue. Since then, she has appeared to commit suicide with several others, but always managing to walk away. Walter (John Noble) and Bell, in studying Dana's blood samples, find that her body may have been altered by several past lightning strikes, making her incapable of dying.

Peter (Joshua Jackson) and Lincoln find that Dana worked as a suicide hotline operator, and in investigating her belongings, find that she appears to have a strong desire to take her soul to heaven or hell. Lincoln comes to believe that Dana may be looking for a way to have her soul "stow away" with that of another to join her family in the afterlife, and used the suicide hotline position to find those who are close to committing suicide.

Another man is found dead by a self-inflicted bullet wound, though Dana was seen leaving his apartment. Evidence in his apartment points to the construction of a bomb, and the Fringe team suspects that Dana knows its location and may be hoping to exploit an event which will kill several people simultaneously in order to increase her own chances of death. Peter calls her, using caller ID spoofing to disguise his number as that of her late husband, and the signal allows authorities to pinpoint her location to a commuter train. The train is stopped and searched, while Dana leaves on her own with the bomb, moving it far enough away from the train. The bomb soon explodes, and when Peter and Lincoln search, they find Dana's body nearby, finally dead, and the only fatality from the explosion.

Peter returns home where Walter has invited Bell to stay the evening. Bell explains that he believes that Dana was finally able to die after serving a purpose—saving the lives of the people on the train. (Note: In the middle of the episode Dana had visited a nun who had procured for Dana a (fictitious) rare and very obscure religious book. The nun related one prominent story from the book about a dead man named Azrael who had been a great sinner and was accordingly trapped in Purgatory. Twenty angels felt compassion for the man and went to Purgatory to carry him to Heaven. They appealed to God to allow the man into Heaven and God permitted this on the basis that their innocence overweighed the man's sins.) When church bells go off nearby, Olivia's personality slips through momentarily. Bell regains control, but expresses new-found fear that his possession of Olivia's body has become more complicated than he thought.

== Production ==
"The idea came from still having story to tell for the character. One of the themes of our show is balance and harmony and the idea that there are two sides to everything. That’s a seed we planted in season one – William & Walter are Lennon & McCartney. They bring out the best in one another and are not complete without the other."

— Executive producer Jeff Pinkner on their decision to bring back William Bell in Olivia's body.

The episode's teleplay was written by Danielle Dispaltro, while the story was contributed by consulting producer Akiva Goldsman and co-showrunners Jeff Pinkner and J.H. Wyman. Supernatural veteran Charles Beeson directed. The episode was shot in early February 2011.

Despite previous guest actor Leonard Nimoy's recent retirement, the writers still had plot lines concerning his character William Bell. Some months prior to the airing of "Stowaway", Nimoy and others had noted that Bell's character would return to Fringe. Anna Torv, who portrays Olivia, was not aware that her character would be channeling Bell until just prior to filming of the episode, and stated of the role, "This is not one I had been asking for!" To prepare, Torv sought advice from her fellow star John Noble, as both as a friend and because Noble's character, Walter, had spent the most time with Bell. She took further advice from the show's dialect coach and reviewed footage of Nimoy's previous work, though eventually she decided to jump right into the role. Noble later commented "I think the solutions she came up with – taking the essence of the man, playing with the eyebrows, simulating the voice — were really smart. We had a lot of fun doing it."

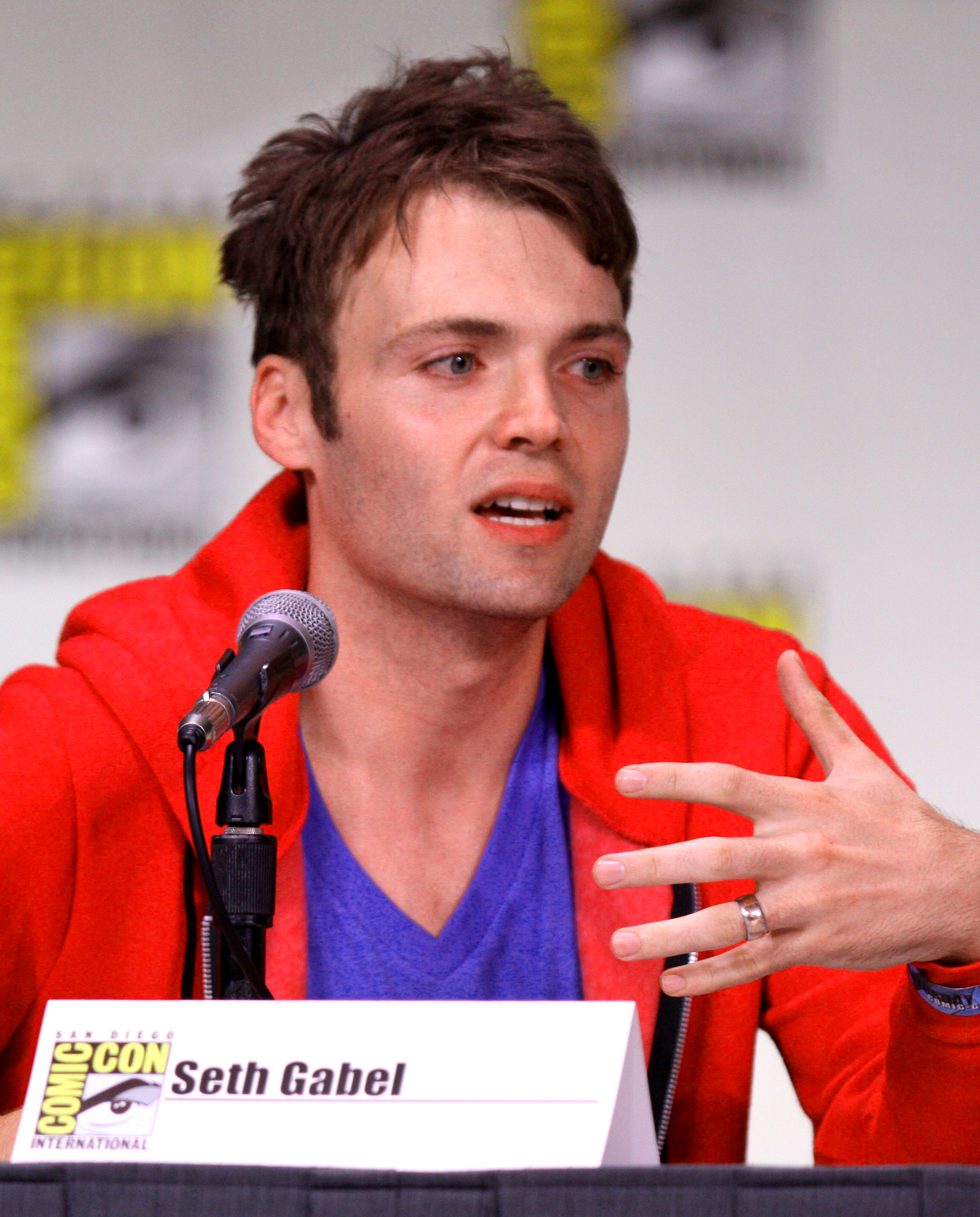
Actor Seth Gabel portrayed the prime universe version of his character Lincoln Lee.

Executive producers J.H. Wyman and Jeff Pickner were both impressed with Torv's take on the role, with Wyman stating that it "just transcended all our expectations", while Pinkner noted that Nimoy himself was "the most proud and most impressed" with the outcome. Actor Joshua Jackson found her performance "so creepy". He explained, "In the episodes, you see I can barely look at her. I think it ended up being a good way to play Peter’s reaction to Olivia, but it was born out of the fact that when that voice came out of her, I was like: ‘Oh, that’s just wrong!'" Pinkner confirmed in an interview with TVLine that Bell's appearance would last for "a couple" episodes, and also warned that "cohabitation is not as benign as William assumes it is", a reference to problems Bell would soon have in Olivia's body. The possessed state of Olivia has led viewers to refer to her as "Bellivia".

"Stowaway" featured a guest appearance by actress Paula Malcomson, her first and only time on the show to date. Guest actor Seth Gabel had previously played just one version of character Lincoln Lee, who existed as the head of Fringe division in the parallel universe. "Stowaway" marked the first appearance of the character from the prime universe. Gabel described his prime universe character as someone who works for the FBI, "but has no idea about Fringe Division. He's more of a desk jockey [who] eventually comes to believe there is much more than reality suggests". Executive producer Jeff Pinkner described Lincoln's introduction as "insanely fun -- the characterization Seth has created just makes you smile". Gabel also indicated the new character would likely return for more episodes.

As with other Fringe episodes, Fox released a science lesson plan in collaboration with Science Olympiad for grade school children, focusing on the science seen in "Stowaway", with the intention of having "students learn about magnetism and how magnets can be created and demagnetized."

== Reception ==
=== Ratings ===
"Stowaway" was watched by an estimated 3.8 million viewers with a 1.3 ratings share among those 18-49 on its first broadcast. It fell 13 percent in this ratings share from the previous week's episode. This was the lowest viewership for the show in the 18–49 adult demographic, though this has been partially attributed to the onset of daylight saving time and the NCAA Tournament. For that night, Fringe helped the Fox network finish in first place among the adult demographic, but it placed in third among total viewers. Time shifted viewing increased the episode's ratings among adults by 57 percent to a 2.2 ratings share. This was the largest increase in time shifting viewing for the week among network shows.

=== Reviews ===
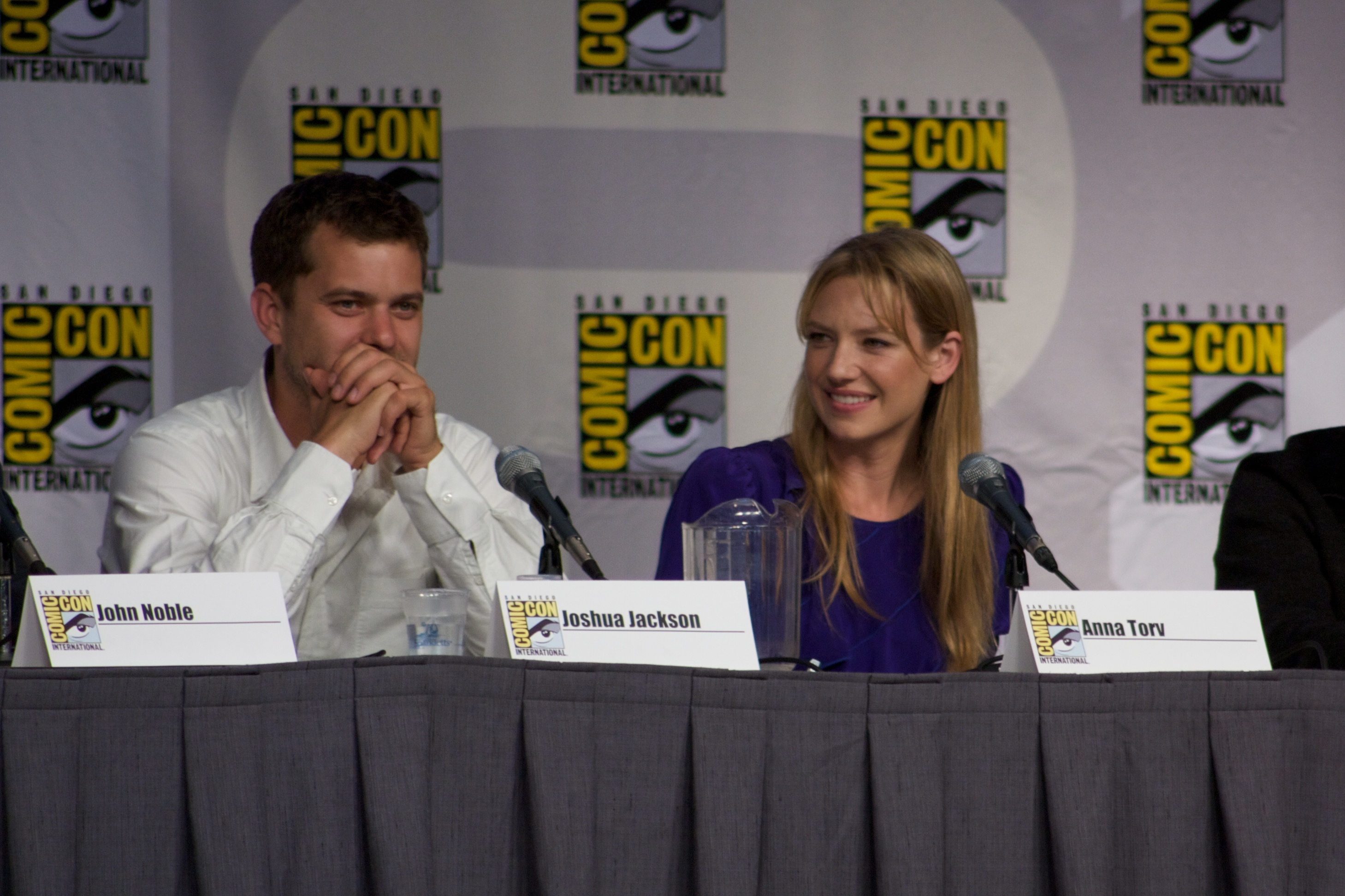
Joshua Jackson and Anna Torv's performances were mostly praised by critics.

Television critics' reviews for "Stowaway" were mostly positive. Writing for Entertainment Weekly, Ken Tucker thought Anna Torv's Nimoy impression was "aces, very wry and amusing," and also praised Joshua Jackson's acting in response to it. Like Tucker, Noel Murray from The A.V. Club also praised Torv and Jackson's performances, and graded the episode with a B+, explaining it "was an effective episode despite all its metaphysical mumbo-jumbo [because] Dana's predicament was a legitimately tense one... As she stepped on the train, I didn't know if she was planning to save the passengers or send their souls a-scattering... the suspense itself was palpable". Murray however admitted that "if the "villain" weren't so sympathetic, or if the action weren't so breathless, or if I didn't find the Bellivia material so funny, I'd probably be annoyed by the wacky way the Fringe writers have found to bring William Bell back." Andrew Hanson of the Los Angeles Times noted of Torv that her "cadence of her words was dead on, and his/her interactions with everyone else in Fringe Division were pitch perfect." He praised other facets of the episode, including how "the weekly mysteries unfold like origami", and that introducing the prime's version of the Lincoln character allowed the audience "to see all the weirdness of Fringe through fresh eyes".

SFScope columnist Sarah Stegall also lauded Torv's performance, noting that the actress "captures Nimoy's staccato delivery, her growling voice, even his trick eyebrow. Not since Zachary Quinto played a young Spock in Star Trek a couple of years ago have I seen anyone so perfectly sound and move like Nimoy." Stegall did express a wish that the characters not try to explain every case (such as the one in the episode) out of a belief that their explanations were often absurd; this observation led Stegall to praise the new character of Lincoln however, as she believed, like Hanson, that the series has "been needing an Everyman in this mix for awhile, someone for whom immortality is not a commonplace." Charlie Jane Anders of io9 was critical of the episode, remarking that "the whole 'soul magnets' thing, which had seemed to be a throwaway comment a few episodes ago, is turning out to be sort of a weak plot device. And the whole bodily-possession storyline is just perhaps one level of wackiness too far for me. I also had the feeling that this might finally be the acting challenge that was beyond Anna Torv's considerable abilities, as her Leonard Nimoy impression quickly started to grate on my nerves."
