= Bring Them Down =

2024 Irish drama film

- Theatrical release poster
- Directed by: Christopher Andrews
- Screenplay by: Christopher Andrews
- Story by: Christopher Andrews; Jonathan Hourigan
- Produced by: Ivana MacKinnon; Jacob Swan Hyam; Ruth Treacy; Julianne Forde; Jean-Yves Roubin; Cassandre Warnauts
- Starring: Christopher Abbott; Barry Keoghan; Nora-Jane Noone; Paul Ready; Aaron Heffernan; Conor MacNeill; Susan Lynch; Colm Meaney
- Cinematography: Nick Cooke
- Edited by: George Cragg
- Music by: Hannah Peel
- Production companies: Mubi; Screen Ireland; Tailored Films; Wild Swim Films; Frakas Productions
- Distributed by: Mubi
- Release dates: 8 September 2024 (TIFF); 7 February 2025 (United Kingdom, Ireland, and United States)
- Running time: 106 minutes
- Countries: Ireland; United Kingdom; United States; Belgium
- Languages: English; Irish
- Box office: $568,114

Bring Them Down is a 2024 thriller film written and directed by Christopher Andrews (in his feature directorial debut), starring Christopher Abbott, Barry Keoghan, Nora-Jane Noone, Paul Ready, Aaron Heffernan, Conor McNeill, Susan Lynch, and Colm Meaney.

The film premiered at the Toronto International Film Festival on 8 September 2024. Its UK premiere was at the London Film Festival. It was released in theatres worldwide on 7 February 2025, by Mubi.

== Plot ==
Michael is a shepherd who lives with his father Ray in rural Ireland. Years prior, Michael caused a car accident in response to his mother telling him she was leaving the family. The crash killed her and heavily wounded his girlfriend, Caroline. In the present day, Caroline is married to Michael's neighbour and fellow shepherd Gary. The family is experiencing financial trouble and after a storm destroys a bridge that links their house to the main road, Gary and Caroline argue about his debt and inability to pay for the repairs. Their son Jack steals two of Michael’s rams to resell to help with his father's finances. Jack lies to Michael and Gary, claiming that he had found the two rams dead on their property and that he had no choice but to dispose of them. Michael later finds his rams for sale at the local livestock market and confronts Gary in a rage, who coldly refuses to return them. Driving home, Gary and Jack angrily chase and taunt Michael, but swerve into a tree, totalling their truck. Michael comes to their rescue and brings them home, only for an ungrateful Gary to threaten Michael and keep his livestock. At home, Gary and Jack argue about the stolen rams and Gary orders Jack to kill them. Jack does not and leaves with his cousin Lee instead. Michael keeps the encounter a secret from his father.

Against his father's wishes, Michael retrieves the flock from the hill and brings them down to the farm. Jack and Lee steal a van and drive to Michael’s farm at night with the plan to steal sheep's legs to sell on the black market. Lee pressures a reluctant Jack into cutting the legs from the sheep while alive, senselessly injuring them and leaving them to bleed out. Michael returns to the farm after carrying a stray and injured lamb down from the mountain. Discovering his mutilated flock, Michael spots and unsuccessfully chases after the van, believing it is Gary's hired builder's. In the chase, Michael's dog Mac attacks Jack, who stabs him with his pocket knife. To end their suffering, Michael is forced to slaughter all of his injured sheep and his beloved dog. Michael tells Ray what happened, who angrily commands him to "bring me the head" of the culprit. Armed with a shotgun, Michael stalks Gary, hiding in his pickup truck overnight and into the next day, when Gary drives to his builder's camper van. Michael fails to bring himself to shoot Gary despite having multiple opportunities. After Gary leaves, the builder, who Michael believes injured his sheep, spots Michael and tries to escape. In the struggle, Michael shoots the builder who in turn shoots Michael in the ear. In defence, Michael pushes him into a pile of bricks which fall, killing him. Michael proceeds to behead the builder and pack his head in a gravel bag to bring to his father.

A bloody and injured Michael walks to Gary's home where Caroline helps him with his wounds. Caroline recognizes the knife Michael retrieved from his injured dog as Jack's, leading Michael to realize that Jack is responsible for the horrors on the farm. Caroline and Jack drive him to his home along with the bagged head, unbeknownst to them. They drive past the slaughtered sheep, which shocks and devastates Caroline. They arrive to find Ray on the ground outside the home, seeming to have passed out. Caroline fails to get a signal when she tries to call emergency services. Despite Jack's pleas, Caroline decides to leave to get a doctor, leaving Jack alone with Michael and Ray. Ray opens the bag, which is revealed to contain the severed head. Michael tells Ray that he has fulfilled his demand of bringing him a head, although admits that this was the "wrong" head. Terrified, Jack flees and Michael harrowingly chases him up the mountain. When Michael catches up to him, Jack tricks and stabs him, while apologizing for what he's done. The two wrestle over the knife and Jack accidentally stabs himself in the process. Michael comforts Jack and carries him back home, where Caroline confronts him with a rifle after discovering the severed head. Michael apologizes to Caroline for the car crash, who puts the gun down and drives Jack away. A dazed and bleeding Michael steps into his home.

== Cast ==
- Christopher Abbott as Michael O'Shea
  - Youssef Quinn as young Michael
- Barry Keoghan as Jack
- Colm Meaney as Ray O'Shea
- Nora-Jane Noone as Caroline
  - Grace Daly as young Caroline
- Paul Ready as Gary
- Aaron Heffernan as Lee
- Susan Lynch as Peggy O'Shea
- Conor MacNeill

== Production ==
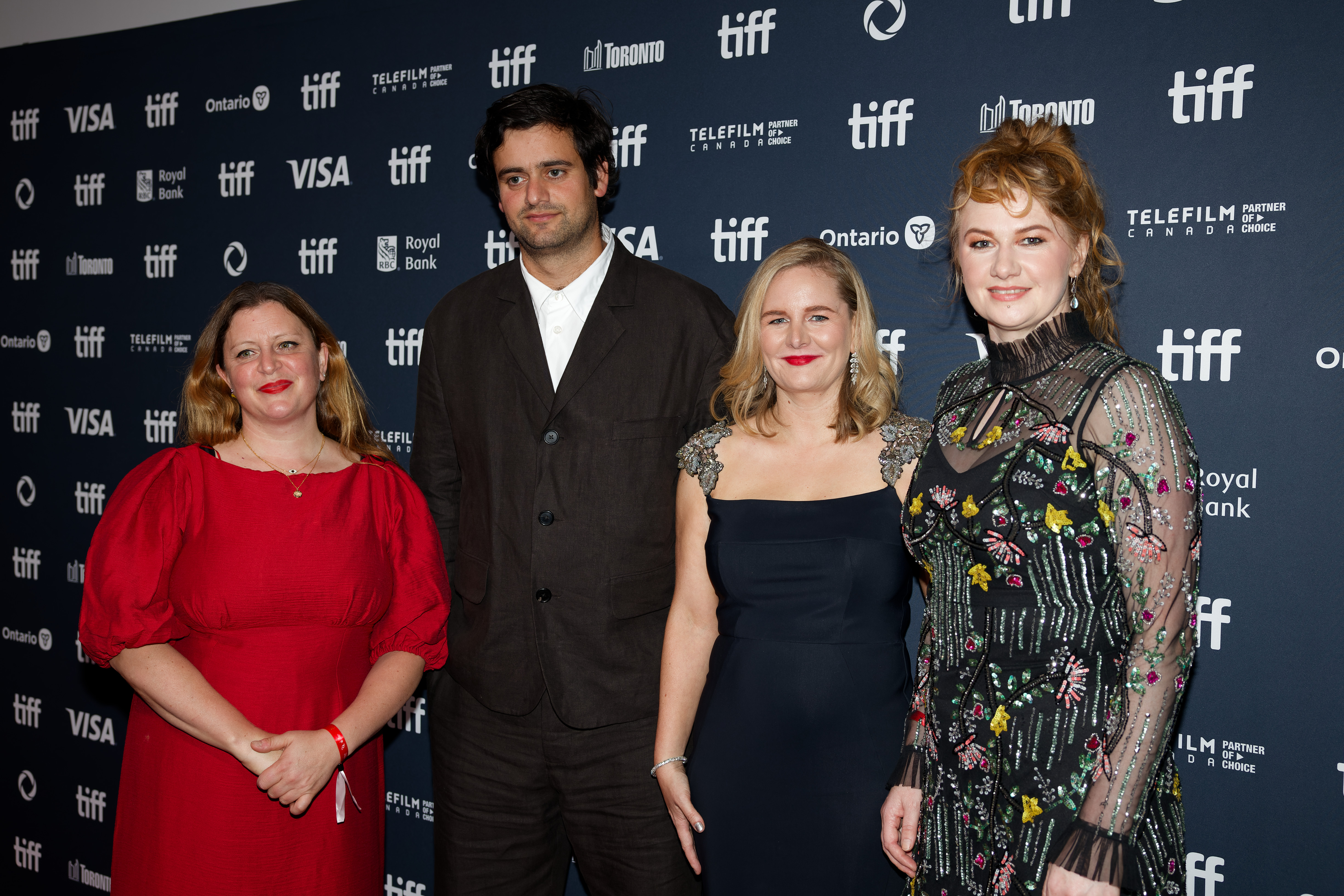
Producers at the 2024 Toronto International Film Festival.

Funding for the film came from Mubi with additional funding from Screen Ireland, the Broadcasting Authority of Ireland and the UK Global Screen Fund which is financed by the UK government's Department for Digital, Culture, Media and Sport and administered by the BFI. It is a European co-production with producers Ivana MacKinnon of the UK's Wild Swim Films; UK Producer Jacob Swan Hyam; Ruth Treacy and Julianne Forde of Ireland's Tailored Films and Jean-Yves Roubin and Cassandre Warnauts of Belgium's Frakas Productions.

=== Casting ===
Barry Keoghan and Christopher Abbott replaced Paul Mescal and Tom Burke in the cast in February 2023.

=== Filming ===
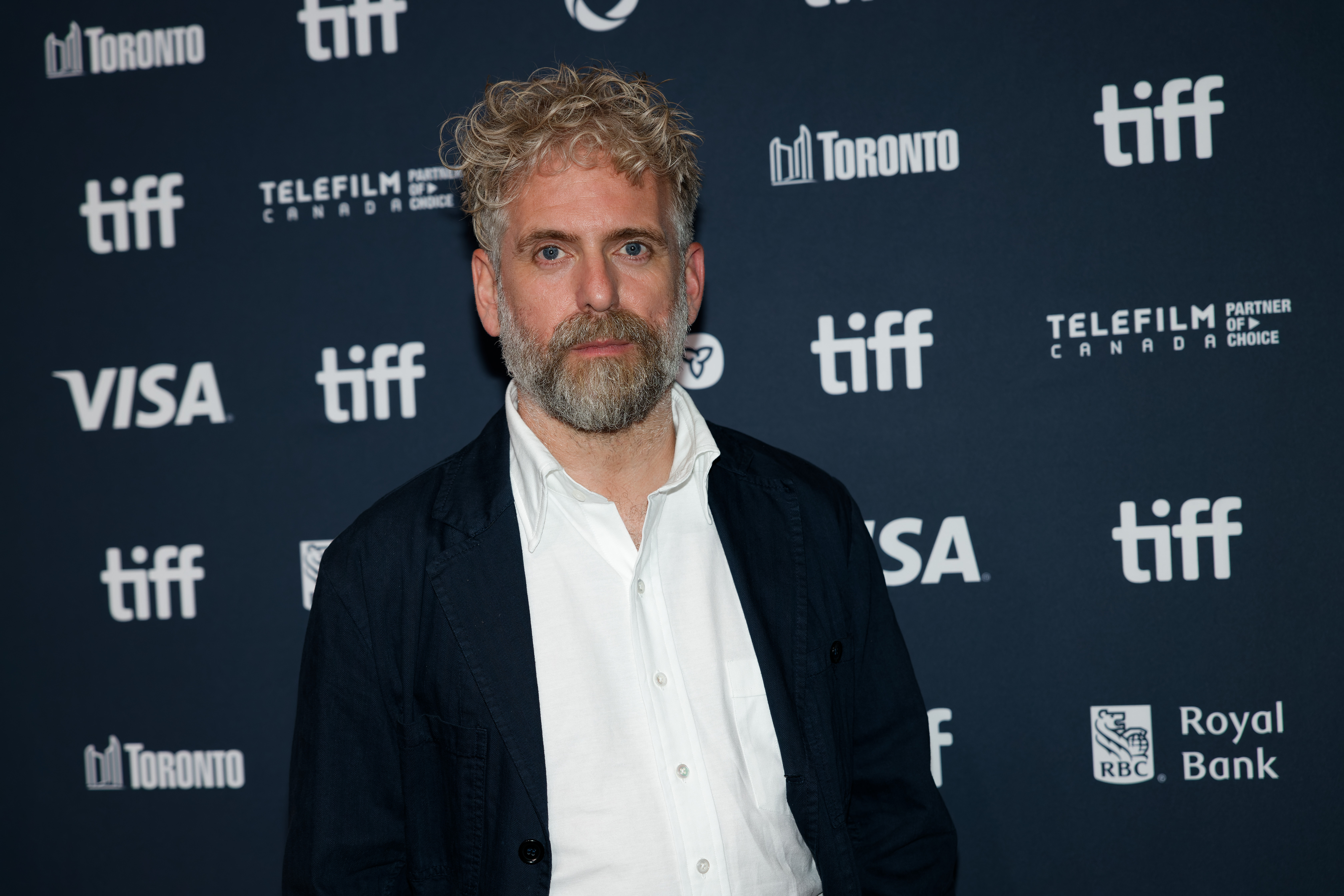
Christopher Andrews

Principal photography took place in Ireland in February 2023.

== Release ==
Bring Them Down had its world premiere at the Toronto International Film Festival on 8 September 2024.

It was released in cinemas on 7 February 2025.

== Reception ==
On the review aggregator website Rotten Tomatoes, 90% of 93 critics' reviews are positive. The website's consensus reads: "By withholding clear heroes or easy villains in its tale of a destructive neighborly feud, Bring Them Down stands out as an exceptionally nuanced exercise in vengeance." Metacritic, which uses a weighted average, assigned the film a score of 63 out of 100, based on 26 critics, indicating "generally favorable" reviews.

Matt Zoller Seitz of RogerEbert.com gave the film three out of four stars and wrote, "For all its ferocious focus, this is a relatively quiet movie that embraces its smallness. It doesn't come at us as a teacher with a lesson, but more like a hard man in a pub who's drunk just enough to loosen up and get a bit vulnerable, but not so much that he gets self-conscious and needs to direct his misery outward and pick fights with other patrons."

=== Accolades ===
Bring Them Down won Best Film at Fantastic Fest, the Fipresci Prize at the Mannheim-Heidelberg Festival and Best Screenplay at the Rome Film Festival.

Andrews won Best Debut Director at the British Independent Film Awards in November 2024, where the film was also nominated for Best Debut Producer.
