= Come Home (TV series) =

British television drama

- Genre: Drama
- Written by: Danny Brocklehurst
- Directed by: Andrea Harkin
- Starring: Christopher Eccleston; Paula Malcomson
- Composer: Murray Gold
- Country of origin: United Kingdom
- Original language: English
- No. of series: 1
- No. of episodes: 3

Production
- Executive producer: Nicola Shindler
- Producer: Madonna Baptiste
- Running time: 60 mins.

Original release
- Network: BBC One
- Release: 27 March – 10 April 2018

Come Home is a three-part British television drama, written by Danny Brocklehurst, starring Christopher Eccleston and Paula Malcomson. It is about a family thrown into chaos when the mother mysteriously walks out. It aired on BBC One from 27 March to 10 April 2018.

== Synopsis ==
In Northern Ireland, Greg Farrell is a working father who struggles to care for his three children, after his wife Marie, suddenly, leaves her family behind.

== Cast ==
- Christopher Eccleston as Greg Farrell
- Paula Malcomson as Marie
- Anthony Boyle as Liam
- Séainín Brennan as Janet
- Brandon Brownlee as Davey

== Episodes ==
No.	Title	Directed by	Written by	Original release date	UK viewers (millions)
1	"Episode 1"	Andrea Harkin	Danny Brocklehurst	27 March 2018	5.54
2	"Episode 2"	Andrea Harkin	Danny Brocklehurst	3 April 2018	4.81
3	"Episode 3"	Andrea Harkin	Danny Brocklehurst	10 April 2018	4.80

== Reception ==
Lucy Mangan of The Guardian awarded the first episode four stars out of five. James Jackson of The Times also gave it four stars. Sean O'Grady from The Independent praised the acting and writing but felt the ending was lacklustre.
