= The Stretford Wives =

2002 British television film

The Stretford Wives is a British drama film made by the BBC. It was first broadcast on BBC One in August 2002. It was written by Shameless writer Danny Brocklehurst and directed by Peter Webber.

== Plot ==
The film revolves around the lives of three sisters – played by Fay Ripley, Claire Rushbrook, and Lindsey Coulson – who live in Stretford, Greater Manchester, England.

== Cast ==
- Fay Ripley as Donna Massey Brent
- Claire Rushbrook as Elaine Massey Simmons
- Lindsey Coulson as Lynda Massey Richards
- Rita Tushingham as Marilyn Massey
- Mark Frost as Billy Brent
- Joe Dixon as Dave McCarthy
- Adrian Rawlins as Frank Foster

== Reception ==
=== Critical reception ===
It won critical acclaim from The Times and The Independent, although reviews in some local papers were not so favourable.

=== Viewership ===
The programme was watched by 5.7 million viewers.

== Home media ==
It has not been released on DVD or Blu-ray.
