= Neil Ashton (actor) =

British television actor

- Born: Neil Smith; 11 December 1969 (age 56); Kendal, Westmorland, England
- Education: Kirkbie Kendal School
- Occupation: Actor
- Writing career
- Period: 1990s–present

Neil Smith (born 11 December 1969), known by the stage name Neil Ashton, is an English actor known for his wide-ranging, often comic, performances in television programmes, notably Channel 4's It's A Sin and Sky's Brassic.

== Life and education ==
Ashton grew up as Neil Smith in Kendal, Cumbria, living above a newsagents on Highgate in the town. After leaving school, he became a fashion editor for teen magazine Just Seventeen.

His notable television performances include 'Grizzle' in It's A Sin and Davey MacDonagh in Brassic. He has worked several times with screenwriter and Doctor Who showrunner Russell T Davies. Ashton's lifetime nickname has been 'Nelly' and this was the name of the character he played in Davies' Cucumber.

== Personal life ==
Ashton took his stage surname from an area of Preston, the town where his mother was born.
