= Paula Malcomson =

Actress from Northern Ireland (born 1970)

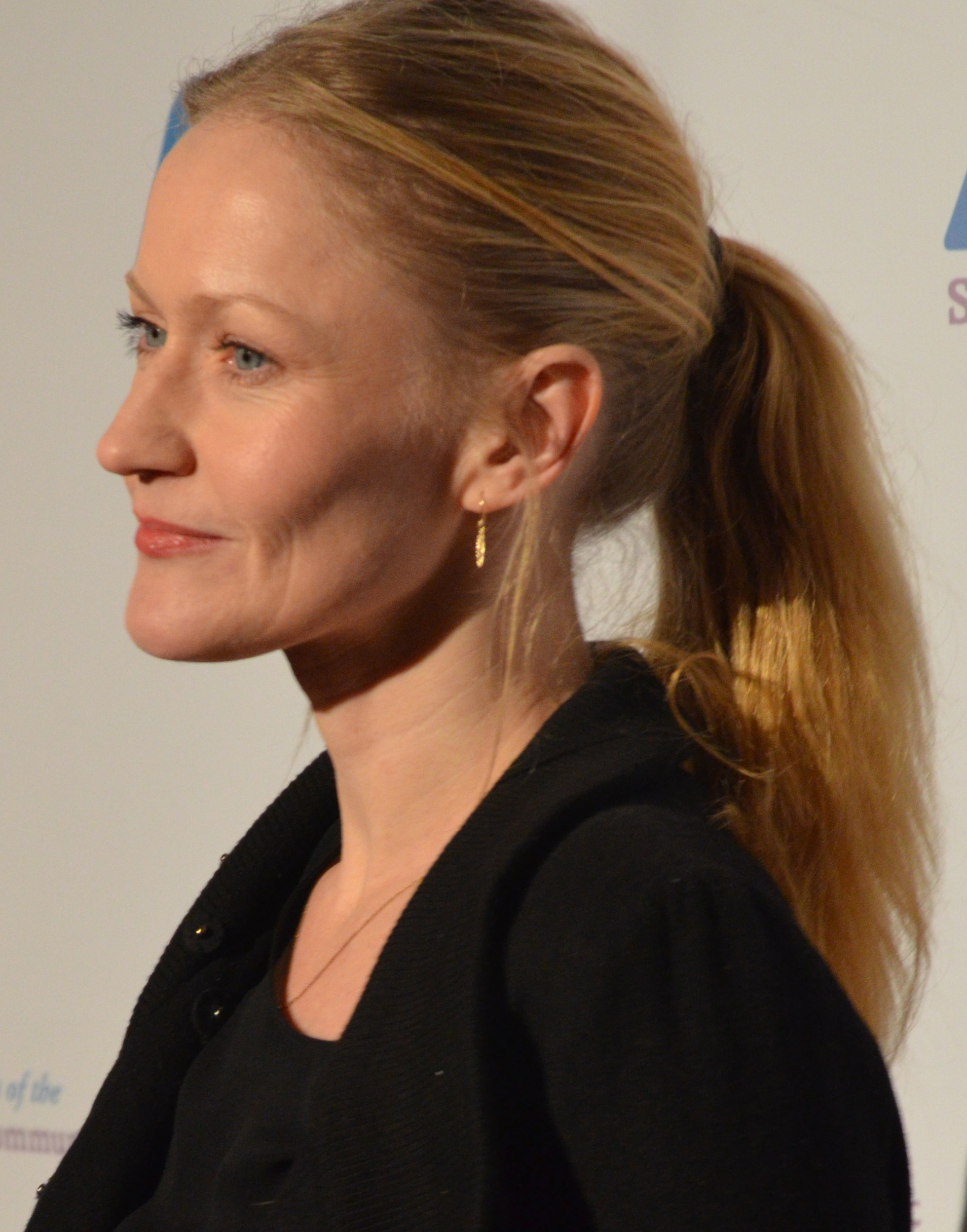
- Malcomson in 2013
- Born: 1 June 1970 (age 56); Belfast, Northern Ireland
- Other name: Paula Williams
- Occupation: Actress
- Years active: 1992–present

Paula Malcomson (born 1 June 1970) is an actress from Belfast, Northern Ireland. She is sometimes credited as Paula Williams. She is known for playing Trixie in Deadwood (2004–2006), Maureen Ashby in Sons of Anarchy (2010), and Asterid Everdeen in The Hunger Games film series (2012–2015).

== Career ==
Malcomson starred as Trixie in the HBO series Deadwood and Colleen in ABC's Lost. She played the role of Amanda Graystone in the Battlestar Galactica spin-off series Caprica, on the Sci Fi Channel, as well as the role of Maureen Ashby on the FX series Sons of Anarchy. She played the long-suffering Abby Donovan, wife of the title character in the Showtime series Ray Donovan.

In March 2011, Malcomson guest starred in the Fringe episode "Stowaway". She played Mrs. Everdeen in the film adaptation of The Hunger Games, mother of the main character Katniss Everdeen.

== Filmography ==
=== Film ===
Year	Title	Role	Notes
1992	Another Girl Another Planet	Bartender	
1993	Tombstone	Allie Earp	
1996	Dunston Checks In	Bellman No. 4	
1998	Trance	Bartender	
1998	The Rocking Horse Winner	Jesse's Mother	Short film
1999	The Auteur Theory	Siobhan Meehan	
1999	The Green Mile	Marjorie Detterick	
2000	Hamlet	Marcella	
2001	A.I. Artificial Intelligence	Patricia in Mirrored Room	
2003	Quintessence	Ruth	Short film
2003	June & Orlando	June	Short film
2007	The Death Strip	Helene	Short film
2007	Nonplussed	Jenn	Short film
2008	A Woman in the West	Marion Faber	Short film
2009	Morning After	Kat McKinley	Short film
2012	The Hunger Games	Mrs. Everdeen	
2013	The Hunger Games: Catching Fire	Mrs. Everdeen	
2014	The Hunger Games: Mockingjay – Part 1	Mrs. Everdeen	
2015	The Hunger Games: Mockingjay – Part 2	Mrs. Everdeen	
2015	A Christmas Star	Paula	
2017	All Summers End	Mrs. Stevens	
2017	Axis	Gráinne (voice)	
2017	Feed	Samantha Grey	
2017	The Cured	Dr. Lyons	
2017	Battlecreek	Tallulah	
2018	We Have Always Lived In the Castle	Helen Clarke	

=== Television ===
Year	Title	Role	Notes
1999	Profiler	Jean Stanley	Episode: "Blind Eye"
2000	The Practice	Suzie Greene	Episode: "Settling"
2000	Strong Medicine	Trish	Episode: "Pre-Existing Conditions"
2000	Baby	Julia	Television film
2001	UC: Undercover	Sasha	Episode: "Zero Option"
2002	Star Trek: Enterprise	Madeline Reed	Episode: "Silent Enemy"
2003	NYPD Blue	Carla Whitford	Episode: "Marine Life"
2003	Six Feet Under	Woman in Bar	Episode: "I'm Sorry, I'm Lost"
2004–2006	Deadwood	Trixie	36 episodes
2006	Lost	Colleen Pickett	2 episodes
2006–2007	ER	Meg Riley	8 episodes
2007	Cold Case	Marlene Bradford	Episode: "A Dollar, a Dream"
2007	John from Cincinnati	Jerri	5 episodes
2007	Criminal Minds	Beth Jacobs	Episode: "Seven Seconds"
2008	Law & Order: Special Victims Unit	Susan Ross	Episode: "Retro"
2009	CSI: Crime Scene Investigation	Amanda / Emma	Episode: "Disarmed and Dangerous"
2009–2010	Caprica	Amanda Graystone	18 episodes
2010	The Event	Madeline Jackson	3 episodes
2010	Sons of Anarchy	Maureen Ashby	10 episodes
2011	Lie to Me	Louise Lightman	Episode: "Funhouse"
2011	Private Practice	Hillary Loveman	Episode: "Home Again"
2011	Fringe	Dana Gray	Episode: "Stowaway"
2011	Law & Order: LA	Jill Jennings	Episode: "Benedict Canyon"
2011	Prime Suspect	Noelle Tanner	Episode: "Carnivorous Sheep"
2012	Archer	Janelle (voice)	Episode: "Bloody Ferlin"
2013–2017	Ray Donovan	Abby Donovan	59 episodes
2017	Broken	Roz Demichelis	4 episodes
2018	Krypton	Charys-El	Episode: "Pilot"
2018	Come Home	Marie Farrell	3 episodes
2018	Lore	Mary Webster	Episode: "Mary Webster: The Witch of Hadley"
2019	Law & Order: Special Victims Unit	Stella Russell	Episode: "Part 33"
2019	Deadwood: The Movie	Trixie	Television film
2019	Watchmen	Renee	Episode: "Little Fear of Lightning"
2022	Redemption	Colette Cunningham	Lead role
2023	Lawmen: Bass Reeves	Mabel Underwood	Episode: "Part III"
2024	Parish	Rose Parish	6 episodes
2024	Mayor of Kingstown	Anna Fletcher	3 episodes
2025	Death by Lightning	Franny Scoville	Upcoming miniseries
2026	The Good Daughter	Judith Heller Pinkman	Limited Series
