= Claude Scott-Mitchell =

Australian actress

- Born: 5 January 1997 (age 29); Canberra, Australia
- Years active: 2008–2010; 2018–present

Claude Scott-Mitchell (born 5 January 1997) is an Australian actress based in London. She is known for her roles in the film The Dry (2020) and the series Hotel Portofino (2022–2023) and The Last Anniversary (2025).

== Early life ==
Scott-Mitchell was born in Canberra and grew up in the Marrickville suburb of Sydney's Inner West. She is from an artistic family, her father Michael a stage production designer and her mother a model. She attended the Newtown High School of the Performing Arts.

== Career ==
Scott-Mitchell began her career as a child actress on stage, appearing in Elke Neidhardt's 2008 Opera Australia production of Don Giovanni and Sergei Tcherkasski's production of Flight at the Parade Theatre in 2010.

Scott-Mitchell resumed her career in 2019 with a small role as Gretchen McGrath in the miniseries Reckoning. She made her film debut the following year playing a young version of Genevieve O'Reilly's character in Robert Connolly's The Dry, an adaptation of the novel by Jane Harper. She also had a recurring role that year in series 2 of the Sky One comedy-drama Brassic as Sara, a love interest of Dylan (Damien Molony).

Scott-Mitchell joined the main cast as Rose Drummond-Ward in the period drama Hotel Portofino, which premiered on BritBox in 2022. Later that year, she starred alongside Richard Roxburgh in The Tempest at the Roslyn Packer Theatre, for which she received a Sydney Theatre Award nomination.

In 2025, Scott-Mitchell played Grace in The Last Anniversary, a television adaption of the Liane Moriarty novel, with The Guardian describing her performance as "excellent".

== Filmography ==
=== Film ===
Year	Title	Role	Notes
2020	The Dry	Young Gretchen	

=== Television ===
Year	Title	Role	Notes
2019–20	Reckoning	Gretchen McGrath	2 episodes
2020	Brassic	Sara	Series 2
2021	Baptiste	Laura Chambers	1 episode
2022–2023	Hotel Portofino	Rose Drummond-Ward	Main role
2025	The Last Anniversary	Grace	Main role

== Stage ==
Year	Title	Role	Notes
2008	Don Giovanni	Ensemble	Opera Australia, Sydney
2010	Flight	Olga	Parade Theatre, Sydney
2022	The Tempest	Miranda	Roslyn Packer Theatre, Sydney

== Awards and nominations ==
Year	Award	Category	Work	Result	Ref.
2023	Sydney Theatre Awards	Best Supporting Performer in a Mainstage Production	The Tempest	Nominated	
