= Aaron Heffernan =

Irish actor (born 1990)

Aaron Doyle-Heffernan
- Born: Aaron Doyle-Heffernan; 23 February 1990 (age 36)
- Education: Trinity College Dublin
- Occupation: Actor
- Years active: 2005–present
- Children: 1

Aaron Doyle-Heffernan (born 23 February 1990) is an Irish actor known for his roles in Love/Hate, Brassic, Obsession: Dark Desires and War of the Worlds.

== Early life ==
Heffernan grew up in Dublin, Ireland. His father, David, is a radio producer and his mother Tina is a model. He is of Dominican descent through his mother. Heffernan has two older brothers: Simon, a personal trainer and online coach, and Jesse, a hip hop artist. His first cousin is model Thalia Heffernan.

He studied drama and classics at Trinity College Dublin.

== Career ==
In 2012, he co-founded the Collapsing Horse Theatre Company with fellow student and actor Jack Gleeson.

== Filmography ==
=== Film ===
Year	Title	Role	Notes
2005	Harry Potter and the Goblet of Fire	Dragon Handler	Uncredited
2013	Alan Partridge: Alpha Papa	Danny's Posse	
2014	Poison Pen	Kurt	
2018	Metal Heart	Alan	
2018	Dublin Oldschool	Aaron	
2018	Solo: A Star Wars Story	Imperial Mudtrooper	
2018	The Titan	Corporal Zane Gorski	
2019	Supervized	Flynn	
2023	Femme	Oz	
2023	The Inventor	Crowd	Voice role
2024	Bring Them Down	Lee	
2026	Cold Storage	Mike	

=== Television ===
Year	Title	Role	Notes
2013–2014	Love/Hate	Detective Gavin	6 episodes
2016	Obsession: Dark Desires	Ramon	Episode: "Beauty in the Bronx"
2016–2018	Mum	Ryan	3 episodes
2017	The Fear	The Fear	Miniseries
2017	Into the Badlands	Dury	Episode: "Chapter XII: Leopard Stalks in Snow"
2018	The Looming Tower	Marine	Episode: "9/11"
2018	Women on the Verge	Facilitator	Episode #1.5
2019	This Time with Alan Partridge	Gino	Episode #1.3
2019–2021	War of the Worlds	Ash Daniel	Main role
2019–2025	Brassic	Ash Dennings	Main role
2022	Atlanta	DeMarco	Episode: "White Fashion"
