= Danny Brocklehurst =

English screenwriter and playwright (born 1971)

- Born: June 1971 (age 55); Hyde, England
- Occupations: Screenwriter; playwright; journalist

Danny Brocklehurst (born June 1971) is an English screenwriter, playwright, and former journalist. He has won both BAFTA and Royal Television Society writing awards. He was featured in the writers' section of Broadcast magazine's Hot 100 in 2007. His 2024 Netflix drama Fool Me Once is the sixth most successful Netflix show of all time. In November 2024, The Hollywood Reporter named him as one of their "'top 50 most powerful producers".

In 2024, Brocklehurst was included in the Radio Times 100 list of the most powerful people in British television.

== Early life ==
Brocklehurst was born in Hyde, Cheshire, in June 1971. He grew up in a working-class home and had several jobs before entering the media. From 1993, he worked as a journalist for several years, freelancing for The Guardian, City Life, and Manchester Evening News while serving as a senior feature writer for The Big Issue.

He is related to the paralympian Sarah Storey.

== Writing ==
=== Television work ===
Brocklehurst left journalism to become a full-time screenwriter. He cited Tony Marchant, Jimmy McGovern, and Alan Bleasdale as his writing inspirations. In a Creative Times feature in 2010, he wrote that Our Friends in the North was his favourite drama of all time. He wrote several episodes of the BAFTA award-winning series Clocking Off, as well as the two-part BBC film The Stretford Wives. With Shameless, he won a BAFTA for series one, co-wrote series two with Paul Abbott and became lead writer on series three. He left prior to the fourth series.

His series Sorted, a BBC postal drama starring Hugo Speer, aired in 2006. In 2007, Brocklehurst wrote a film about the Fathers4Justice campaign for producers Harbour Pictures. His Company Pictures produced four-part ITV drama, Talk To Me, starring Max Beesley, Laura Fraser, Adrian Bower, Kate Ashfield and Emma Pierson.

He has written episodes of both Jimmy McGovern's The Street and crime drama Accused for BBC One. In 2011 he wrote a three-part BBC drama, Exile, starring John Simm and Jim Broadbent. It received an average of 5.5 million viewers and an audience appreciation score of 90%.

In 2011 it was announced that Brocklehurst would write a new HBO drama, Dirty, with Andrea Arnold attached to direct. This project was subsequently developed with Sharon Horgan and Amazon. In August 2013, BBC One announced a new drama, Ordinary Lies, written by Brocklehurst.

The Driver, starring David Morrissey was announced in January 2014, a three-part drama about a taxi driver who takes a job driving for a criminal. Shown on BBC One, it co-starred Ian Hart, Claudie Blakely, and Colm Meaney. It was co-created by Jim Poyser and made by Red Productions and Highfield Pictures. In January 2015, US network Showtime announced they were developing a remake of the drama.

In February 2014, HBO announced a project called A Teacher, which would be co-written by Brocklehurst and Hannah Fidell, and executive produced by Mark Duplass. The show, a drama about a teacher/student relationship, based on the film of the same name, did not get made by HBO but was picked up by FX. In 2017 Netflix made Safe starring Michael C. Hall, written by Brocklehurst and Harlan Coben.

Come Home, a three-part BBC drama, aired in April 2018, starring Christopher Eccleston and Paula Malcomson. The Stranger, also co-written with Coben, debuted on Netflix in January 2020, starring Richard Armitage, Stephen Rea and Jennifer Saunders. The first series of Brassic premiered on Sky in 2019 and was recommissioned for five additional series. It is Sky's most successful comedy since 2012.

His Netflix series Stay Close was the highest rated UK series of 2022.

In May 2022, the BBC and STAN commissioned a new series created by Brocklehurst, Ten Pound Poms, a drama about the British citizens who migrated to Australia after the Second World War, with filming commencing in Australia shortly after. Ten Pound Poms was the highest rating new BBC drama of 2023.

In 2024, his drama Fool Me Once became a smash Netflix hit. The series was number one in 75 countries and is currently the 6th most successful English language Netflix show of all time.

Parish, the American version of his hit UK show The Driver aired on AMC in 2024, starring Giancarlo Esposito.

Brocklehurst was named in the Radio Times Top 100 in 2024, of most influential people in television.

=== Film ===
In film, he adapted the Whitbread nominee novel Buddha Da (as Jimmy Buddha); and wrote The Railway Children Return for Studio Canal, a sequel to the 1970 film, The Railway Children, itself based on the E. Nesbit novel.

=== Theatre ===
Brocklehurst has written three award-winning plays, My Eight Times Table, Nobody and Loaded (transferred to Radio Four), as well being story adviser and book co-writer of the West End (and national touring) musical Never Forget. His play Casual Ties was a Royal Exchange hit in 2014. It is a dissection of modern relationships.

=== Radio ===
Brocklehurst has written extensively for radio. His detective series Stone for Radio 4 is in its ninth series. It stars Hugo Speer as Detective Inspector John Stone and every episode features a morally complex crime. It has been described as "gritty" (The Guardian), "hard hitting" (The Times), and "realistic in a way radio drama rarely is" (The Observer).

He wrote a play about Margaret Thatcher's mutually assured destruction policy in the 1980s, The End of The World, a thriller about a man who seems to have ceased to exist, Nobody, an Australian set examination of greed, Loaded and a single drama about an eighty-year-old woman who admits to a series of brutal murders, Mary Shane.

He has appeared as a regular commentator on Radio 4 and 5Live.

Brocklehurst wrote the podcast Ecstasy: The Battle Of Rave that features David Morrissey, Monica Dolan, Ian Hart, Meera Syal and Ade Edmondson. It is half drama, half documentary.

=== Music ===
In 2013, Brocklehurst co-wrote the Mint Royale song "Ring".

== Filmography ==
Production	Episodes	Broadcaster
Clocking Off	series 2–4, 5 episodes (2001–2003): (BAFTA nomination)	BBC One
Linda Green	Writer, 3 episodes (2001–2002)	BBC One
The Stretford Wives	Television film (2002)	BBC One
Shameless	series 1–3, 8 episodes (2004–2006): (BAFTA winner)	Channel 4
Sorted	4 episodes (2006)	BBC One
Talk to Me	Creator (2007)	ITV
The Street	1 episode (2007)	BBC One
Shameless	1 episode (2011)	Showtime
Accused	2 episodes (2010–2012): Accused 2 – (BAFTA nomination, best Mini-series, International Emmy nomination Best Drama Series)	BBC One
Exile	3 episodes (2011): (BAFTA nomination)	BBC One
The Driver	Creator, writer (2014): RTS best drama nomination.	BBC One
Ordinary Lies	Creator, writer (2015–2016)	BBC One
The Five	Writer (2016)	Sky One/Netflix
In the Dark	Creator, writer, executive producer (2017)	BBC One
Safe	Writer (2018)	Netflix
Come Home	Creator, writer, executive producer (2018): Winner of RTS best writer and best drama awards.	BBC One
Brassic	Creator, writer, executive producer (2019–2025): BAFTA nominated 2020	Sky One/Sky Max
The Stranger	Writer, executive producer (2020)	Netflix
A Teacher	Executive producer (2020)	FX on Hulu
Stay Close	Writer, executive producer (2021)	Netflix
No Return	Creator, writer, executive producer (2022)	ITV1
Ten Pound Poms	Creator, writer and executive producer (2023–2025)	BBC One/Stan
Fool Me Once	Writer and executive producer (2024)	Netflix
Missing You	Executive producer (2025)	Netflix
Lazarus	Creator, writer, executive producer (2025)	Amazon Prime Video
Run Away	Writer and executive producer (2026)	Netflix
The Woods	Writer and executive producer (TBA)	Netflix

== Awards ==
=== BAFTA ===
BAFTA TV Award

Year	Series	Category	Result
2001	Clocking Off	Best Writer	Nominated
2002	Shameless	Best Series	Won
2002	Clocking Off	Best Drama Series	Nominated
2006	Shameless	Best Writer	Nominated
2011	Exile	Writer, actor	Nominated
2020	Brassic	Writer	Nominated

In 2011 he was nominated for three Writers Guild Awards for Exile and Accused and Brassic, for which he won.

=== Royal Television Society ===
RTS Television Award

Year	Series	Category	Result
2001	Clocking Off	Best Writer	Nominated
2002	Shameless	Best Series	Won
2006	Shameless	Best Writer	Nominated
2015	The Driver	Best Serial	Nominated
2018	Come Home	Writer, best drama	winner
2020	Brassic	Writer	nominated
