= April Pearson =

English actress

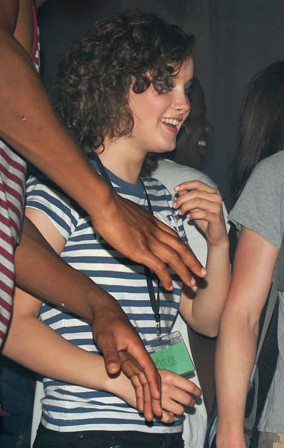
- Pearson at a Skins party in 2007
- Born: April Janet Pearson; 23 January 1989 (age 37); Bristol, England
- Education: Colston's Girls' School; Bristol Old Vic Young Company
- Occupations: Actress; writer; producer
- Years active: 1998–present
- Spouse: Jamie Patterson (m. 2017)
- Children: 1

April Janet Pearson (born 23 January 1989) is an English actress. Born and brought up in Bristol, Pearson was drawn to acting from a young age and appeared in local theatre productions as a child. She made her acting debut in 1998 at the age of nine on the British medical drama series Casualty, and earned wider recognition in her breakthrough role as teenager Michelle Richardson in the E4 teen drama series Skins (2007–2008), for which she was nominated for the Golden Nymph Award for an Outstanding Actress in a Drama Series at the Monte-Carlo Television Festival.

She later made her film debut when cast in Jon Wright's comedy horror slasher film Tormented (2009). Pearson followed this with her Bristol Old Vic debut as Jemma in Catherine Johnson's Suspension (2009); the production centering around the Clifton Suspension Bridge and the nearby Avon Gorge Hotel, and as Callie in Rachel Sternberg and Jemma Wayne's Negative Space (2009), in which she received praise for both performances.

Her transition to horror and independent films began with the 2016 horror film Fractured, then followed by Caught (2017), for which she garnered critical acclaim for playing Mrs. Blair, one half of the antagonistic couple. Her role of Amy in Dark Beacon (2017) earned her two Best Actress awards at American Horror and Upstate NY Horror film festivals. She followed this by her portrayal of Isla Crane in Edgar Wallace's The Case of the Frightened Lady at the Theatre Royal, Windsor, in which she received praise for her performance.

== Early life ==
Pearson was born and raised in Bristol. She attended Colston's Girls' School in the Montpelier area of Bristol, where in 2007 she was appointed head girl, and was a member of the Bristol Old Vic Young Company. Both of her parents had previously worked in the television industry, with her father still being involved in the British medical drama series Casualty.

== Career ==
=== Early career and Skins (1998–2008) ===
Pearson joined a theatre group, located in Bristol, becoming one of its founding members at three years of age. Throughout her youth, she starred in various plays with both her drama group and whilst at school. At the age of 9, Pearson made her television debut with a minor role in the British medical drama series Casualty in 1998. Pearson was a student at Colston's Girls' School in 2006 when she was cast in the television teenage-drama Skins. Casting director Jane Ripley and Adam Smith travelled to Colston's Girls' School to hold auditions, wherein Ripley asked Pearson whether she wished to audition after watching her drama class. The programme was a success and ran for seven series, only two of which Pearson appeared in. Her performance was well received; the character was popular, and Pearson garnered widespread attention. She stated that the amusing nature of simply playing someone who's very different from her in person was what drew her to playing Richardson in Skins. After the release of the first season, Pearson stated that being recognised was rather strange, though remarked that, "I try to be nice to everyone and hope they keep watching the show." Skins won the British Academy of Film and Television Arts (BAFTA) Philip Audience Award, and Pearson was nominated for the Golden Nymph Award for Best Actress in a Drama Series. Of her time on Skins, Pearson spoke of how she learnt to cope on a set and how to act in the working world, to which she added: "I owe the position I am in now to Skins and I'm so happy and proud that it has done so well."

=== Tormented and Bristol Old Vic debut (2009–2012) ===
Pearson briefly appeared as Karen Shevlin an episode of the British medical drama series Casualty. She later made her feature film debut as sadistic schoolgirl Natasha Cummings, in Jon Wright's comedy horror slasher film Tormented (2009). She reunited with her Skins co-star Larissa Wilson, and starred opposite Alex Pettyfer, Tuppence Middleton and Georgia King. In an interview with The Evening Standard's Andy Barker, she stated, "I don't want to pigeon-hole myself this early on. I enjoy every genre."

Later in 2009, Pearson returned to theatre starring in Catherine Johnson's Suspension (2009) at the Bristol Old Vic. Michael Billington wrote, in his review for The Guardian, "You sense a bond of buried affection between James Lailey's guilt-ridden Gerry and [Pearson] as the bridling bride-to-be. In fact, all the performances from director Heather Williams's largely Bristol-based cast are good." Metro described it as "a fantastic success – for Johnson, the cast and crew, for Bristol Old Vic and for Bristol, the star of the show." Paul Callan of The Daily Express wrote: "Down in the hotel Jemma panics with her pre-wedding nerves and the (very pretty) [Pearson] gives us all too recognisable Big Day nerves. She has a fine sense of comic timing and is a perfect foil for the overpowering Anita, her Sherman Tank of a mother." Additionally, in the autumn, she portrayed kidnapped teenager called Callie in Rachel Sternberg and Jemma Wayne's Negative Space (2009). The Evening Standard spoke highly of Pearson's performance, in which they wrote: "The star, emphatically, is [Pearson], gamine and effulgent as Callie. Pearson is 20, but proves unsettlingly convincing as a girl not much more than half her age." In 2011, Pearson returned to Casualty to star as Grace Fitch, whilst starring in David Allain's short film Will You Marry Me? (2011). In 2012, Pearson co-starred in Jen Moss' dark comedy-drama short film My Brother's Keeper (Or How Not To Survive The Apocalypse), playing the role of Jess, who is looking after her well-meaning but dim-witted brother during a zombie apocalypse. Moss would later be awarded the Best Writer and Director Awards at the Viscera Film Festival. Of Pearson's performance as Jess, Bloody Disgusting remarked that the dynamic between Alex Esmail and Pearson is both "touching and funny".

=== Theatre return and collaboration with Jamie Patterson (2013–2015) ===
She later reunited with Skins co-creator Bryan Elsley in 2013, in which she briefly appeared as Liz in Dates. She also appeared in television programmes Casualty, and Comedy Feeds, before appearing in a minor role in the Giles Foster's television film Unknown Heart (2014). Pearson also appeared as Gen in Circle of Truth, a short film shot by David Allain which explored some of the challenges that people with multiple sclerosis face when deciding whether or not to disclose their diagnosis to their colleagues. The film's inception came about when Shift.ms, a charity and social network for people with Multiple Sclerosis, contacted producer Jess Gormley. Alongside Pearson, Circle of Truth featured Ashley Thomas, Nathan McMullen, Lauren Socha, Simon Day, Justin Edwards, and Nicholas Burns. In April 2014, Pearson co-starred opposite Ben Peel in Greg Zinger's romantic comedy short film The Engagement (2014), which focused on the difficulty of making marital commitment. In her second feature-film, Pearson portrayed Beth Prince, a young woman in search of her happy ever after, in Jamie Patterson's romantic comedy Home for Christmas (2014). The film was based on Cally Taylor's novel of the same name, and co-starred Lucy Griffiths, Karl Davies, Derren Nesbitt, and Shirley Jaffe. Later that year, Pearson reunited with David Allain to reprise her role of Gen in short film Working It Out, in which her character interviews other people with multiple sclerosis about their experiences of employment. The soundtrack was provided by The Maccabees, and Pearson co-stars alongside Gabriel Bisset-Smith and Preeya Kalidas.

In January 2015, she starred in the music video for The Wombats' single, "Greek Tragedy", in which Pearson plays an obsessed Wombats fan. In the first half of 2015, Pearson played Lexi in Neil Jones's critically panned action film Age of Kill (2015). In the same year, Pearson starred in Nick Gillespie's psychological horror film Tank 432 (2015). Although the film was critically panned, praise was given to its cast. Emilie Black of Cinema Crazed praised Pearson's Annabella, whilst writing "it was nice to see a female character not in need of saving, who is just one of the guys, in a film involving a military-style team and tough guys." Frank Scheck of The Hollywood Reporter acknowledged that "Several talented performers are wasted in the morass." Ben Robins of The National Student wrote: "Even the cast, a who’s who of largely forgotten-about (but still entirely reliable) British talent, from Rupert Evans to Michael Smiley and Skins’ [Pearson], seemed like a stab in the right direction." Chuck Wilson wrote, in his review for The Village Voice, "Trapping his cast in a tight space is daring, but Gillespie hasn't given his six good actors, among them Evans and Gordon Kennedy, much to say beyond shouted variations on the word “fuck.”" In 2015, Pearson returned to theatre to perform on stage in Threesome at the Brighton Fringe, and then the Edinburgh Festival Fringe. The production received favourable reviews, with particularly strong praise for Pearson and her co-stars; "Pearson, meanwhile, carries the part of the confident, daring and over-sexed third party to the limits – but successfully so. The dialogue is fast and furious, and with pacy interactions, the three actors together create a thoroughly watchable story".

=== Transition to horror and independent films (2016–present) ===
In 2016, Pearson starred in Fractured, about a couple whose peaceful getaway weekend goes awry, where she reunited with Home for Christmas's Karl Davies and director Jamie Patterson. The cast of Fractured also included Louisa Lytton, Jordan Metcalfe and Calvin Dean. British horror genre website Love Horror wrote: "Pearson and Davies are well suited to their characters, convincingly performing the loving couple that are being pursued." For her work in Fractured, Pearson received the Best Actress Award from the British Horror Film Festival. She also starred as Gemma in Mdhamiri Á Nkemi's short film Cuttings (2016), in which her character returns to her family home after a recent death to discover buried family truths in an uncovered archive of home video.

Pearson reunited with Patterson once again for Caught (2018), in which she plays Mrs. Blair, alongside Cian Barry's Mr. Blair, respectively. The story follows a journalist couple who invite a man and woman, Mr & Mrs Blair, into their idyllic village home. The film also stars Mickey Sumner, Ruben Crow, Regan Elizabeth Brown, Dave Mounfield and Aaron Davis. Pearson received critical acclaim by critics for her performance as Mrs. Blair. William of All Horror spoke most highly of Pearson's performance as Mrs. Blair, with him writing, "[Pearson] deserves some kind of award for her nearly wordless, but not silent performance. She lets the audience know with her eyes and grunts that this skin-suit is barely containing some other life-form that is dying to tear you apart, but cannot until she gets these irritating photographs from the couple." Frank Scheck of The Hollywood Reporter also spoke highly of such a thing, in which he stated: "[...] Caught delivers plenty of terrifying moments, thanks to the highly committed performances by the central quartet [...]". Noel Murray of the Los Angeles Times noted praise of the performances, remarking that "Caught hits the usual beats, but with an unusually strong cast and original characters." Jeannette Catsoulis praised the cast, in her review for The New York Times, by stating "As played by [Barry] and [Pearson] [...], the interlopers are a weird, disgusting delight, easily dominating the movie and their ineffectual hosts." Bobby LePire of Film Threat Bobby LePire wrote, "What cannot be overlooked is the animalistic qualities of Mrs. Blair.", in which he later concludes that "[...] the acting serves the unnerving atmosphere perfectly [...]". Brad Miska of Bloody Disgusting acclaimed the performances of Barry and Pearson, with Miska stating, "There's plenty of tension, with the performances by [Barry] and [Pearson] carrying the entire film on their backs, not to mention an escalation of terror [...]". Mike Sprague of JoBlo.com praised Pearson's characterisation, in which he wrote, "[Pearson's] arc throughout the movie is my favorite thing about the piece, and I'm sure it will be yours as well." Film at Lincoln Center described both Barry and Pearson's Mr and Mrs. Blair as being "played perfectly".

Pearson's next appeared in Corrie Greenop's horror thriller Dark Beacon (2017). She played Amy Wilcock, who loves the married Beth Gadbsy with a fierce and tragic passion. The resulting performance was positively received; Sol Harris of Starburst concluded, "Pearson and Lynne Anne Rodgers do an admirable job working with the material that they’re given and attempting to carry the vast majority of the film on their own - not to mention child actor, Kendra Mei [...]". Jon Dickinson of Scream wrote that, "In a post-Skins appearance, April Pearson is great in the lead role as Amy. She is the voice of reason when things start to get spooky." April McIntyre of HeyUGuys praised Pearson by stating, "[Pearson] has emerged from a post-Skins hibernation with a strong and nuanced performance as Amy [...] Matched perfectly with Beth's spiralling psychosis, together they complement each other with an effective balance of wanting, sheer terror and anxiety." For her work in Dark Beacon, Pearson received the award for Best Actress from American Horror Film Festival and the Upstate NY Horror Film Festival.

The following year, it was announced that Pearson would portray Isla Crane in Edgar Wallace's The Case of the Frightened Lady. Response to Pearson's performance in The Case of the Frightened Lady was met with enthusiasm; Vikki Stephenson of Young Perspective wrote, "[Pearson] proved adept as a terrified Isla (the secretary of the house) [...] These performances result in an ultimately enjoyable and engaging show." Alison Brinkworth, writing for Behind The Arras, described her as adding "youthful vibrancy", while Rebecca Lipkin described, in her review for The Arbuturian, Pearson as "charismatic". Albeit praise for Pearson's performance, critics highlighted the underwritten characterisation of Pearson's Isla Crane.

She reunited with Skins co-creator Bryan Elsley for the third time, in which she briefly appeared as Polly in Kiss Me First. Pearson also starred as Lily in Patterson's critically acclaimed comedy-drama Tucked (2018), the estranged daughter of Derren Nesbitt's Jackie. In 2018, Pearson co-wrote and starred in Patterson's independent comedy-drama film Tracked, in which a young couple try to save their failing relationship by interrailing around Europe together. The film premiered at the Raindance Film Festival, wherein Pearson and co-star Chris Willoughby's performances were praised, as well as Edouard Fousset's cinematography. In 2020, she also appeared as Katy in supernatural rom-com short film One Year Later, with whom she co-starred alongside starring Simon Weir, Mark Wood, and Rhys-Teare Williams. She was also amongst the first to sign up for George Webster's British science fiction comedy Star Dogs, wherein she played Cass Rio. Pearson also appeared as Abi in Matthew Leutwyler and Anton Laines' Disconnected, which was a weekly, experimental drama series shot by the actors and produced remotely, in the United States, India, United Kingdom, and Rwanda, while under countrywide quarantine orders due to the COVID-19 pandemic. In March 2021, she appeared in an episode of the BBC soap opera Doctors as Chloe Shapley.

Pearson stars as Eva in Adam Oldroyd's black comedy directorial debut Sideshow, alongside Anthony Stewart Head, Les Dennis, and Nathan Clarke. Additionally, she reunited with director Jamie Patterson in the romantic crime film God's Petting You, and in the psychological thriller The Kindred.

== Personal life ==
Pearson was involved in Channel 4's "Lost for Words" campaign, a season of campaigning programmes to get children reading, in which she reads aloud from Kasper in the Glitter by Philip Ridley. She's an admirer of Spanish cinema and the works of Pedro Almodóvar, while speaking highly of Malorie Blackman's Noughts and Crosses series. She's based in Brighton. In 2014, Pearson founded the Laboratory Theatre Company with film director Jamie Patterson. The Laboratory Theatre is a production company dedicated to blending theatre and film. Pearson began a relationship with Patterson, after they met on the set of the Home for Christmas (2014). Pearson and Patterson were married in 2017. Since 2020, Pearson has hosted a casual celebrity interview-based podcast called Are you Michelle from Skins?; the first episode being recorded on 6 July and broadcast on Instagram. She listed her idols as including Bernadette Peters, Nicole Kidman, Julie Walters, and Judi Dench. On 8 December 2021, Pearson announced she was pregnant with her first child.

She resides in Brighton.

== Filmography ==
=== Film ===
Key
†	Denotes films that have not yet been released

Year	Title	Role	Director	Notes
2009	Tormented	Natasha Cummings	Jon Wright	
2014	Home for Christmas	Beth Prince	Jamie Patterson	
2015	Age of Kill	Lexi	Neil Jones	
2015	Tank 432	Annabella	Nick Gillespie	
2016	Fractured	Rebecca	Jamie Patterson	Also producer
2017	Caught	Mrs. Blair	Jamie Patterson	
2017	Dark Beacon	Amy Wilcock	Coz Greenop	
2018	Tucked	Lily	Jamie Patterson	
2018	Tracks	Lucy	Jamie Patterson	Also writer and makeup designer
2021	Sideshow	Eva	Adam Oldroyd	
2021	The Kindred	Helen Tullet	Jamie Patterson	Also executive producer
2022	God's Petting You	Advisor Sue	Jamie Patterson	

=== Television ===
Year	Title	Role	Notes
1998	Casualty	Girl	Episode: Internal Inferno: Part 1 Episode: Internal Inferno: Part 2
2007–2008	Skins	Michelle Richardson	Main cast; 19 episodes (seasons 1–2); Nominated – Golden Nymph Award for Outstanding Actress - Drama Series (2008)
2008	Casualty	Karen Shevlin	Episode: "To Thine Own Self Be True"
2011	Casualty	Grace Fitch	Episode: "Starting Out"
2013	Dates	Liz	Episode: "Mia & David"
2013	Comedy Feeds	Kate	Episode: "Bamboo"
2013	Casualty	Amy Godley	Episode: "The Memory of Water"
2014	Unknown Heart	Secretary	Television film
2015	Suspicion	Angie	Episode: "Designing Murder"
2018	Wars	Aida	TV series
2018	Kiss Me First	Polly	Episode: "Make it Stop"
2020	Star Dogs	Cass Rio	Television film
2020	Disconnected	Abi	Miniseries; also contributing writer
2021	Doctors	Chloe Shapley	Episode: "Fifty-Fifty"

=== Short film ===
Year	Title	Role	Notes
2007	Skins: Secret Party	Michelle Richardson	Directed by Owen Harris (Note: The Skins "mini-sode" was broadcast after the conclusion of the first series, bridging the gap between the first and second series. It was directed by Owen Harris, with the short featuring the characters organising a party, with live music from Foals. Filming took part in a cavernous old church in Bristol and was broadcast on Myspace.)
2007	Unseen Skins	Michelle Richardson	Directed by Nicholas Hoult; 5 episodes (Note: The Skins series was a variety of short online specials that ran in conjunction with the main series, featuring new young writers and directors. Pearson first appeared in I Mostly Do on 26 January 2007, which was directed by Nicholas Hoult, and subsequently at least four episodes afterwards, including: "A Friend In Need", "Careers Advice II", "The Cat & The Duck", and "Michelle's Looking for a Date".)
2007	Skins: The Lost Weeks	Michelle Richardson	3 episodes (Note: The Skins:The Lost Weeks were broadcast after the conclusion of the first series, bridging the gap between the first and second series.)
2011	Will You Marry Me?	Anja	
2012	My Brother's Keeper (Or How Not To Survive The Apocalypse)	Jess	
2014	Circle of Truth	Gen	
2014	The Engagement	Kate	
2014	Working It Out	Gen	Sequel to Circle of Truth
2016	Cuttings	Gemma	
2020	One Year Later	Katy	
2022	Flipit: Sticky Party	Ruby	

=== Music videos ===
Year	Artist	Title
2015	The Wombats	"Greek Tragedy"

== Theatre ==
Year	Title	Role	Notes
2009	Suspension	Jemma	Bristol Old Vic, Bristol
2009	Negative Space	Callie	New End Theatre, London
2015	Threesome	Lucy	Brighton Fringe, Brighton (Note: After its various runs at Brighton Fringe and the Edinburgh Festival Fringe in 2015, Threesome was transferred to Union Theatre, London from 3 May, to 14 May 2016, and later returned to the Union Theatre from 14 March, to 25 March 2017.)
2018	The Case of the Frightened Lady	Isla Crane	Theatre Royal, Windsor (Note: After opening at the Theatre Royal, Windsor on 10 January 2018, The Case of the Frightened Lady was followed by a nationwide tour.)

== Awards and nominations ==
Year	Awards	Category	work	Result	Ref.
2008	Monte-Carlo Television Festival	Outstanding Actress - Drama Series (Golden Nymph)	Skins	Nominated	
2016	British Horror Film Festival	Best Actress (Haunted Award)	Fractured	Won	
2017	British Horror Film Festival	Best Supporting Actress (Jury Prize)	Caught	Won	
