= Cally Taylor =

English writer

Cally Taylor, also known as C.L. Taylor, is an English crime author. Under the name Cally Taylor she wrote romantic comedies published by Orion Publishing Group and as C.L. Taylor, she publishes psychological thrillers through HarperCollins. On 16 July 2024, she was awarded an honorary degree of Doctor of Letters from the University of Northumbria in Newcastle-on-Tyne

== Early life and education ==
Taylor was born in Worcester and obtained her degree in psychology from the University of Northumbria in Newcastle-on-Tyne. After graduating, she moved to London for two years and then spent 13 years in Brighton, where she began to write. She worked as a graphic designer, web developer, instructional designer. She now lives in Bristol, with her partner and their son, and writes full-time.

== Career ==
Taylor first began writing short stories in 2005. In 2006, she won two short story competitions, the Helen Mullin Awards and the Bank Street Writers competition, and was also runner-up in the Woman's Own short story competition. She has had numerous stories published in women's magazines and newspapers including the Sunday People and the Sunday Express.

Taylor's debut novel, Heaven Can Wait, won the Pink Thong Award for Best Debut in the Chicklit Club 2009 awards and was the first book ever to score ten out of ten in the club's rating system.

Her second novel, Home For Christmas, was made into a film by JumpStart Productions, directed by Jamie Patterson, and starring Lucy Griffiths, April Pearson, Karl Davies, Derren Nesbitt, Amanda Piery and Shirley Jaffe.

Her first psychological thriller, The Accident, sold over 150,000 copies in the UK alone and reached number 3 in the Amazon UK Kindle Chart. The BookSeller magazine named The Accident 'One of the Top Ten Bestselling Debuts of 2014'.

The Lie ranked at number 5 in the Sunday Times Bestseller charts in the first full week of publication and remained in the top 20 for five weeks. It also reached the number one spots on Amazon Kindle, Kobo, Google Books, iBooks and Sainsbury ebooks and took the number 2 spot below The Girl on the Train in The Bookseller Official E-Book Sales Ranking for May 2015. The Lie was shortlisted for two Dead Good Books Reader Awards in 2015: Most Recommended Read and Most Exotic Location. The Lie has been optioned for TV by The Forge.

The Missing was ranked at number 6 in the Sunday Times bestseller chart and sold over 100,000 paperbacks within a year of publication.

The Escape went to number 2 in the Sunday Times bestseller chart and won the Dead Good Books Hidden Depths Award for Most Unreliable Narrator.

The Fear reached number 6 in the Sunday Times bestseller chart.

Sleep, her first hardback, hit number 4 in the Sunday Times original fiction chart and was selected as a Richard and Judy Book Club pick. In July 2019, Cally appeared on the Sara Cox show on ITV alongside actor Ross Kemp and the Kaiser Chiefs' frontman Ricky Wilson.

Taylor's novels have been published in the UK and US and translated into over twenty-five languages including Chinese, Russian, Hungarian, German, Portuguese, Spanish, Taiwanese, French, Italian, Polish, Indonesian, Croatian, Norwegian, and Czech.

Taylor is represented by Madeleine Milburn, formerly of Darley Anderson Literary, TV and Film Agency, and now head of Madeleine Milburn Literary, TV and Film Agency.

== Bibliography ==
=== Romantic comedies ===
- Heaven Can Wait (2009)
- Home For Christmas (2011)

=== Psychological thrillers ===
- The Accident (2014)
- The Lie (2015)
- The Missing (2016)
- The Escape (2017)
- The Fear (2018)
- Sleep (2019)
- Strangers (2020)
- Her Last Holiday (2021)
- The Guilty Couple (2022)
- Every Move You Make (2024)
- It's Always The Husband (2025)
- Notes on an Obsession (2027)

=== Young adult thrillers ===
- The Treatment (2017)
- The Island (2021)

=== Short Story Collections ===
- Secrets and Rain (2012)
- Tell Them No Lies (2023)
