= Shirley Jaffe =

Shirley Jaffe may refer to:

- Shirley Jaffe (artist) (1923–2016), American abstract painter
- Shirley Jaffe (actress) (1934–2022), British actress
