= Unwelcome (film) =

2023 film by Jon Wright

- Theatrical release poster
- Directed by: Jon Wright
- Written by: Mark Stay
- Story by: Mark Stay; Jon Wright
- Produced by: Piers Tempest; Peter Touche
- Starring: Hannah John-Kamen; Douglas Booth; Jamie-Lee O'Donnell; Colm Meaney; Kristian Nairn
- Cinematography: Hamish Doyne-Ditmas
- Edited by: Zsófia Tálas
- Music by: Christian Henson
- Production companies: Ingenious Media; Tempo Productions
- Distributed by: Warner Bros. Pictures
- Release date: 27 January 2023
- Running time: 104 minutes
- Countries: Ireland; United Kingdom
- Language: English
- Box office: $258,938

Unwelcome is a 2023 British folk horror film directed by Jon Wright, co-written by Wright and Mark Stay. The film stars Hannah John-Kamen, Douglas Booth, Jamie-Lee O'Donnell, Colm Meaney and Kristian Nairn.

Unwelcome was released in Ireland and the United Kingdom on 27 January 2023, by Warner Bros. Pictures.

== Plot ==
Young couple Jamie and Maya live together in London. After learning that Maya is pregnant, Jamie celebrates with her only for them to be attacked by a gang of hoodlums. Maya is left unharmed. In the aftermath of the assault, Jamie and Maya take the opportunity to move to an idyllic new home in rural Ireland, inherited from Jamie's great-aunt Maeve after her death.

The house requires some work, prompting them to hire the local Whelan family as builders. They are troubled by a warning from Niamh, an old friend of Jamie's aunt, that they should leave an offering of liver at a door of the house's back garden every night for the Red Caps that live in the forest, but accept it as a harmless superstition.

As Jamie and Maya spend more time in the house, they are troubled to learn that Maeve lost a child herself, a daughter who disappeared when the girl was barely two years old, and the body was never found. Niamh tells Maya an old story that the baby was lost as part of a deal with the Red Caps to save the life of the child's father who later dies, but Maya wonders if the child was killed in a fit of post-partum depression.

The Whelans soon prove themselves to be violent and disturbed; younger children Aisling and Killian often steal minor items from the house, and older son Eoin is often beaten by "Daddy" Whelan. At one point, Maya is lured into the wood by a dog, where she finds a stone shrine to the Red Caps. While trying to return to the house, she finds Eoin, who talks about the abuse he receives from his father, but when she offers him comfort Eoin tries to assault her, only for him to be dragged away by what Maya later identifies as the Red Caps.

That night, Jamie has a confrontation with Aisling and Killian in the pub about what happened to their brother, while Maya is visited by a Red Cap that presents her with Eoin's head in a plastic bag. When Jamie returns the two are shocked at this proof that the Red Caps are real, but the house is then attacked by the Whelans, seeking answers about Eoin's disappearance. Maya is caught with Eoin's head while trying to escape as Jamie distracts Daddy Whelan at the front door, forcing Maya to flee into the woods to ask the Red Caps for help with a promise to give them anything. In response to Maya's appeal, the Red Caps come to the house and fight with the Whelans, killing all three as Maya gives birth.

Once the baby has been checked at the hospital, their first night back at the house sees the baby being taken by the Red Caps as payment for their help. Maya follows them to the shrine where she discovers an elderly woman who she realises is the lost daughter of Jamie's aunt, kept by the Red Caps. Refusing to let them keep her daughter and to take her instead, Maya then kills one of the Red Caps and crushes the old woman's skull with her bare hands. This makes the Red Caps revere her. She and her daughter return to the house and Jamie watches in horrified awe as Maya is "baptised" with the blood and skull of the dead woman, apparently being proclaimed as the new "Mother Redcap".

== Cast ==
- Hannah John-Kamen as Maya
- Douglas Booth as Jamie
- Jamie-Lee O'Donnell as Aisling
- Colm Meaney as Daddy Whelan
- Kristian Nairn as Eoin
- Niamh Cusack as Niamh
- Chris Walley as Killian
- Paul Warren as Redcap Mr Sniff
- Rick Warden as Redcap Chief
- Ania Marson as Mother Redcap

== Production ==
Wright was inspired by the Grimm Fairytales and stories from his own Irish grandfather. Wright described it as a "home invasion movie" and pitched it as "Gremlins meets Straw Dogs". John-Kamen and Booth were announced on the production in October 2020 when it was originally called "Little People". Meaney, O'Donnell, Walley and Nairn were also an announced then. The film is produced by Cornerstone films and Peter Touche and Piers Tempest and Jo Bamford's Tempo Productions. The film comes from Warner Bros UK and was based on an original screenplay by Mark Stay. It has prosthetics by Shaune Harrison with Paul Catling on creature design and the visual effects supervisor Paddy Eason who all worked together on Wright's previous film Grabbers.

== Release ==
Unwelcome was released in Ireland and the United Kingdom on 27 January 2023, in the United States on 10 March 2023, and on digital on 14 March 2023 by Warner Bros. Pictures. It was previously scheduled for 4 February 2022, before being moved up to 28 October 2022, then to its current release date.

== Reception ==
On the review aggregator website Rotten Tomatoes, Unwelcome holds an approval rating of 63% based on 46 reviews with an average rating of 5.8/10. The site's consensus reads: "Unwelcome's tonal and pacing issues prevent this rural horror outing from reaching its full potential, but it's still frequently fun".

Little White Lies reviewed the film as saying "Anyone who has seen director Jon Wright's previous boozy creature comedy Grabbers might expect Unwelcome to resemble the madcap chaos of Gremlins or Ghoulies, [but] the tone is more sober...the psychological and the supernatural similarly abut one another as two sides of the same divide". And said there were "vivid metaphors for the trauma which sufferers can negotiate only at a costly price...Straw Dogs and Wrong Turn meet Irish folk horror". Ellen E Jones evoked Straw Dogs in The Guardian but likened it to "Straw Dogs meets Fraggle Rock. Unwelcome eschews tasteful ambiguity in favour of polyfoam beasties that could have scuttled straight off the set of a lost Jim Henson classic." Jones added "the script by Wright and Mark Stay weaves in enough anxieties, both contemporary and primal, to sustain suspense even amid the silliness. It adds up to an enjoyably unpretentious Irish-ish folk horror." John Nugent in Empire said "In the CGI era, practical effects are fast becoming a lost cinematic art. On that basis alone, then, we should be grateful for Unwelcome...this is a film that benefits greatly from the practical execution of its puckish perils, a glorious hark back to an era when tiny imps really did look like they could scratch your eyes out."
