= Mark Stay =

English screenwriter and novelist (born 20th century)

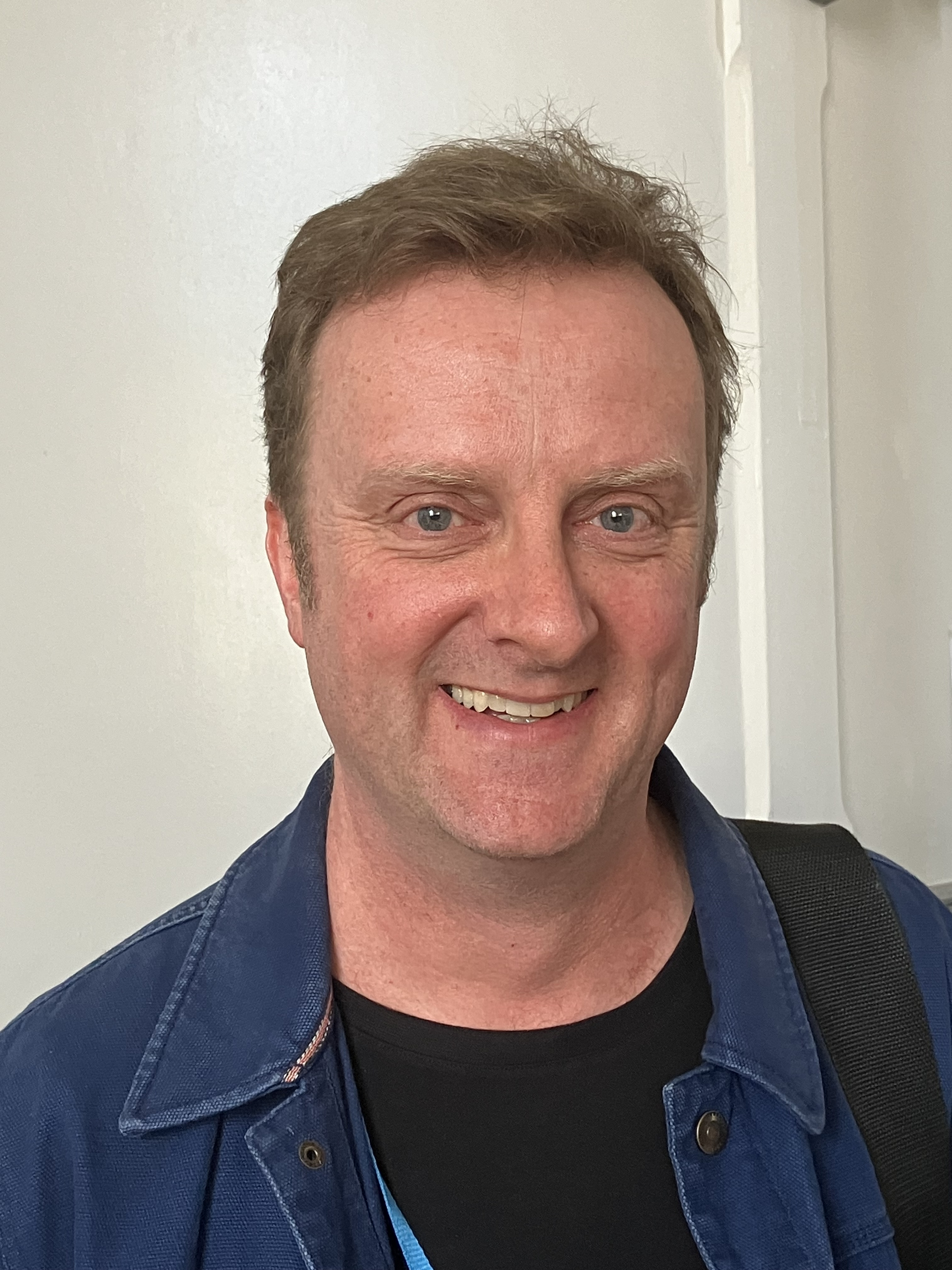
- Stay in 2014
- Born: London
- Occupations: Screenwriter, novelist
- Known for: Robot Overlords, The Bestseller Experiment
- Website: markstaywrites.com

Mark Stay is an English screenwriter and novelist, best known for his collaborations with Jon Wright. He also co-hosts the writing podcast The Bestseller Experiment.

== Biography ==
Born in London, Stay worked in retail and then in publishing. He would write in his spare time, eventually publishing novels such as The Witches of Woodville series from Simon & Schuster , praised by the Irish Independent as 'extremely funny, full of imagination, verve and typical English ‘home counties’ wit', as well as The End of Magic Trilogy from Unbound. His first screenplay, Eddie’s Dead, was chosen for the Film London Microwave scheme, and he was selected for Vipers Nest, a creative collective for commercial-orientated emerging filmmakers.

Meeting Wright in 2006, Stay co-wrote with him the 2014 science fiction adventure film Robot Overlords starring Ben Kingsley and Gillian Anderson. Stay would also write the film's novelisation. The book included extra scenes and bonus material not included in the film. It was published in the UK on 12 February 2015, and Stay wrote a satirical piece for The Guardian about surviving the story's robot occupation.

Reuniting with Wright, Stay co-wrote Unwelcome, a fantasy horror film starring Hannah John-Kamen. The monsters in the film were based on creatures from Anglo-Scottish folklore called Redcaps. Stay and Wright finished and sold the screenplay at the start of the 2020 COVID-19 lockdown. Unwelcome was released in Ireland and the United Kingdom on 27 January 2023, and in the United States on 10 March 2023. Stay would also sell a treatment to production company Moonriver TV, a prequel to the Jules Verne novel Twenty Thousand Leagues Under the Seas, that became the 2024 Disney+, later Amazon Prime Video, television series Nautilus.

Stay now lives in Kent with his wife Claire Burgess.
