= Tormented (2009 British film) =

- Original release poster
- Directed by: Jon Wright
- Written by: Stephen Prentice
- Produced by: Tracy Brimm; Kate Myers; Cavan Ash; Arvind Ethan David
- Starring: Alex Pettyfer; April Pearson; Dimitri Leonidas; Calvin Dean; Tuppence Middleton; Peter Amory; Geoff Bell
- Cinematography: Trevor Forrest
- Edited by: Matt Platts-Mills
- Music by: Paul Hartnoll
- Production companies: Pathé; BBC Films; Forward Films; Screen West Midlands; Slingshot
- Distributed by: Warner Bros. Pictures
- Release date: 22 May 2009
- Running time: 91 minutes
- Country: United Kingdom
- Language: English
- Box office: $1.3 million

Tormented is a 2009 British black comedy slasher film directed by Jon Wright, written by Stephen Prentice, and starring Alex Pettyfer, April Pearson, Dimitri Leonidas, Calvin Dean and Tuppence Middleton. The plot centres on a group of students being stalked and murdered by the ghost of a bullied teenager. The film was released on 22 May 2009 in the United Kingdom by Warner Bros. Pictures and was produced by BBC Films, Pathé, Slingshot Studios, Forward Films, and Screen West Midlands. It received mixed reviews from critics.

== Plot ==
Head girl Justine Fielding is escorted out of Fairview High School by the police, as other pupils look on.

Five days earlier, Justine is reading the eulogy at the funeral of unpopular, asthmatic student Darren Mullet. Mullet's equally unpopular friend, Jason Banks, is (literally) thrown out of the church by the sadistic P.E. teacher after calling Justine a hypocrite because he did not really know him. Later, Justine agrees to go to a party with Alex, organised by his popular friends, Bradley, Tasha, Khalillah, Sophie and Marcus.

When Justine arrives at the party, the DJ, Jez, egged on by Tasha, raps unflatteringly about her, before being thrown out of the party by Bradley. Bradley, Tasha, Khalillah, Marcus and Sophie all receive insulting text messages from Mullet's number. Later, Alex and Justine go to a bedroom and make out, only to be pranked by Bradley, wearing a clown costume and pretending to attack them with a chainsaw. Later, the 'in-crowd' toast Mullet. Justine admits that she did not know who he was. Jez goes to the cemetery and urinates on Mullet's grave. He is stabbed with a wooden crucifix by Mullet's ghost.

At school, Bradley threatens Nasser, the leader of the school's emo clique, about removing a website he had put up about Mullet. Justine drops her old friends Helena and Emily to hang out with the popular crowd. She finds a teddy bear (stolen from Mullet's grave) in her locker and, assuming it is from Alex, agrees to go on another date with him. Jason tells her that Mullet was in love with her and hands her his suicide note. In the school's recording studio, Mullet's ghost forces Nasser to listen to music at top volume through his headphones, rendering him permanently deaf.

Bradley and Marcus assault Jason, who they believe to be sending the text messages, but they are interrupted by another message, which Jason could not have sent. The P.E. teacher arrives, lets the bullies go and gives Jason detention. Later, Justine confronts Jason. He denies forging the suicide note, and tells her that Mullet killed himself because of bullying by the popular students, including vicious texts and a website that Bradley's gang created about him. Alex's friends tell her she cannot hand the note to the police, because it accuses Justine of hating him, thus supposedly implicating her in his death. The girls attack Justine's former friend Helena in the toilets; Tasha smashes her phone after accusing her of sending the messages. After swimming practice, Sophie tells Justine that she should sleep with Alex that night, but goes back into the swimming pool to retrieve her watch. She is attacked and drowned by Mullet's ghost.

Mullet's ghost brings flowers for Justine, but, after seeing her have sex with Alex, tears the badge from her uniform, and re-arranges her fridge magnets, calling her a "dirty slut". During football training Marcus becomes hysterical after seeing Mullet's ghost, and the P.E. teacher sends him off for a shower. Mullet's ghost then whips him with a towel, almost popping one of his eyes out its socket. He fights Mullet off with a cricket bat and gets outside, but is impaled through the skull upon an iron fence by the ghost. Later on, the gang have an argument at Bradley's house about who killed their friends, ending in Tasha fighting Justine and throwing her into the swimming pool.

Justine demands that Alex shows her the website, where she tearfully witnesses the in-crowd bullying Mullet. Justine realises that Alex was the leader of the bullies, and watches Alex make fun of her as well, calling her the rare species of animal "Head Girlus, Frigidus Bitchus". Justine also realises she could have helped Mullet, but she ignored his pleas because he interrupted a conversation about her going to Oxford University. She tells Alex that their relationship is over.

After trying to dig up Mullet at the cemetery, Bradley breaks down and cries over the death of his friends. Tasha consoles him and they have sex in the car, but Mullet drags him out and rips off his penis, causing him to bleed to death. Tasha escapes and runs into an open grave, where Mullet decapitates her with a shovel.

Next day, Justine tells Jason, who is in the Art Room, that she was responsible for Mullet's death. He tells her that it was his fault, because he was scared of being bullied, so he told Bradley that Mullet fancied her. After she leaves the room, Mullet jams two pencils up Jason's nose and slams his head against the table, killing him. Justine vainly begs her old friends Helena and Emily to take her back, telling them that her new friends, including Alex, were all horrible.

Khalillah tells Justine that she received a text message from Tasha (who she does not know is dead) to meet in the Art Room. There Mullet places a plastic bag over Khalilah's head, before cutting off her hands with the guillotine. Justine and Alex arrive at the Art Room and find the bodies of Jason and Khalillah, and are attacked by Mullet. They stab him with a screwdriver and head to the common room, where Mullet nails Alex's hand to the floor with the screwdriver. Justine stops him, but he begins to choke her to death. She takes Mullet's inhaler and throws it across the room, telling Alex to break it. He does, and the ghost begins to die. Justine tells Alex to leave, but he finds Mullet's other inhaler, which Alex had hidden from Mullet when he was alive. Mullet then uses it, restoring his strength, and stabs Alex in the throat with the screwdriver before disappearing. The police arrive, having found Justine's badge near the bodies of Bradley and Tasha. She is led out into the police vehicle, arrested for the murders that Mullet had committed.

== Cast ==
- Tuppence Middleton as Justine Fielding
- Alex Pettyfer as Bradley
- April Pearson as Natasha Cummings
- Dimitri Leonidas as Alexis
- Calvin Dean as Darren Mullet
- Georgia King as Sophie
- Mary Nighy as Helena
- Olly Alexander as Jason Banks
- James Floyd as Nasser
- Sophie Wu as Mei Lei
- Hugh Mitchell as Tim
- Larissa Wilson as Khalilah
- Ruby Bentall as Emily
- Tom Hopper as Marcus
- Peter Amory as Head Teacher
- Geoff Bell as Games Teacher
- Ben Lloyd-Hughes as Jez
- Roger Ashton-Griffiths as Mr. Humpage
- Thaddeus Griffin as Petchy
- Sandra Dickinson as Miss Swanson

== Production ==
=== Development and filming ===
On 5th July 2008, Jon Wright would be confirmed to direct a British comedy horror and slasher film titled Tormented (with a script written by Stephen Prentice) which would be announced to be released in cinemas on 22 May 2009 in the UK on 5th January of the following year. Cavan Ash, Tracy Brimm, Arvind Ethan David and Kate Myers produced the film with the budget of £703,000 and Stephen Prentice wrote the film. It was announced that Alex Pettyfer, April Pearson, Dimitri Leonidas, Georgia King, Larissa Wilson, Calvin Dean, Tom Hopper, Tuppence Middleton, Mary Nighy, Olly Alexander, Sophie Wu, Hugh Mitchell, James Floyd, Peter Amory, Ruby Bentall and Geoff Bell would star in the movie with Warner Bros. distributing it in the UK on Pathe behalf after the two companies struck a theatrical distribution deal while IFC Films acquired US distribution rights to the film. Paul Hartnoll would compose the music for the movie. BBC Films, Pathé and Forward Films co-produced the film. The film was shot largely at both Bishop Vesey's Grammar School in Sutton Coldfield and Streetly School in Birmingham (both of which are located in the West Midlands of England) starting on 4th August 2008 and lasting through 6th September 2008.

== Soundtrack ==
- Dead In Love - Desert Sessions
- What Planet You On? – Bodyrox ft. Luciana
- Lesbian Roadkill - Tantric Dwarf
- Ride – The Vines
- Outtathaway! - The Vines
- Don't Be Afraid – Keaton Henson
- Dew Climbs - Lunz
- Monster Hospital – Metric

== Release ==
The film was released in the UK on 22 May 2009. The world premiere took place on 19 May at the Empire Cinema, Leicester Square followed by a national premiere at Cineworld in Birmingham on 21 May 2009. Originally acquired for U.S. distribution by Paramount Vantage, IFC Films took over after the former shut down. The film ran on the IFC Festival 2009 on 21 September 2009. The film's budget was under £1 million ($1.5 million). IFC Films released the film in the US via on-demand service in late October 2009.

=== Home media ===
The DVD was released in the UK on 28 September 2009.

== Reception ==
The film has received mixed reviews from critics. It holds a 69% rating and an average rating of 5.7 on Rotten Tomatoes from 27 reviews with the consensus stating, "It relies too heavily on American slasher cliches, but Tormented is a timely, funny and even somewhat touching entry in the high school horror genre". Total Film magazine described the film as "A slasher for the Skins generation" and goes on to say "Tormented catches the spirit of the times without being too try-hard. Quips and snogging take precedence over scares, but its commentary on new technology’s power to intimidate is chillingly apt." and awarded the film 3 stars out of 5. Empire called it "cynical, gruesome fun" and "consistently funny" and awarded the film 4 stars out of 5. Sky Movies also awarded the film 4 stars out of 5. In the news awarded the film 9 out of 10, and Real awarded the film 5 stars.

== See also ==
- List of ghost films
