= Robot Overlords =

2014 British science fiction film

- Theatrical release poster
- Directed by: Jon Wright
- Written by: Mark Stay; Jon Wright
- Produced by: Justin Garak; Ian Floots; Steve Milne; Piers Tempest
- Starring: Ben Kingsley; Gillian Anderson; Callan McAuliffe; Ella Hunt; James Tarpey; Milo Parker; Craig Garner; Tamer Hassan; Roy Hudd; Geraldine James
- Cinematography: Fraser Taggart
- Edited by: Matt Platts-Milss
- Music by: Christian Henson
- Production companies: Isle of Man Film; Pinewood Pictures; Umbra Telegraph; BFI; Tempo Productions; Wasted Talent; British Film Company; Embankment Films; Invizible; Northern Ireland Screen
- Distributed by: Signature Entertainment
- Release dates: 18 October 2014 (LFF); 27 March 2015 (United Kingdom)
- Running time: 90 minutes
- Country: United Kingdom
- Language: English
- Budget: $21 million
- Box office: $991,329

Robot Overlords (originally titled Our Robot Overlords) is a 2014 British independent science fiction film, starring Callan McAuliffe, Ben Kingsley and Gillian Anderson. The film is directed by Jon Wright and produced by Piers Tempest. The estimated budget was $21 million.

== Plot ==
Not long after the invasion and occupation of Earth by an extraterrestrial race of powerful robots wanting human knowledge and ingenuity, humans are confined to their homes. Leaving without permission would be to risk their lives. Monitored by the electronic implants in their necks, the robot sentries are able to track the movement of humans in order to control them. If any person attempts to exit their home, they are given warnings by the robot sentries to return to their home. If he or she does not comply within ten seconds, they are annihilated on sight.

In a rural town in England, a teen going by the name of Sean Flynn (Callan McAuliffe) is seeking his father, who went missing not long after the robots invaded, sending out hand-drawn lost posters hidden in tennis balls and fruit. Later, Nathan, a friend of Sean's, is seen attempting to repair his PlayStation, when Connor, a young boy, accidentally shocks Nathan, while a girl named Alexandra watches. The group discovers that Nathan's implant has been turned off by the electrical shock, and then perform the same procedure on each other to stay outside without being tracked down. The group enters a local museum before Sean suggests that they go look for his father, Danny (Steven Mackintosh) at the school, where the files on all the people are kept. They discover that Danny is still alive, having been moved to a hotel, but are then caught and brought to a room with a deep scanner after their implants reboot. Here, Robin Smythe (Ben Kingsley), a collaborator with the robots, asks them how they turned off their implants. When they refuse to answer, Sean's uncle is brought in, and receives a black implant, before being subjected to a deep scan, a painful process that searches through all of a person's mental faculties before rendering them unable to eat, causing them to die in a few days. When the children still refuse to answer, Sean is also given a black implant before being subjected to a deep scan. In the midst of it, Sean insults Smythe, causing him to accidentally interrupt the deep scan, allowing Sean to escape the deep scanner alive. A few seconds later, Connor, who had been left outside, bursts in with a makeshift fireworks launcher and frees the other children. The children hide in a bowling alley, where they turn off their implants once again before running to the hotel. When a large robot walks by, the four children hide next to a doorway, where Sean inadvertently controls the robot.

The children then meet Monique, a woman who wants to know how to turn off the implants. In exchange, the boys meet Swanny, who has had his implant removed by a watchmaker, and also tells the children to go to a Stone Circle. However, an announcement reveals that Sean's mother, Kate, has been taken prisoner in the area headquarters, a castle. With Monique's help, the children successfully get to the castle. However, they are caught by a large robot. Sean then discovers that he can take control of the robots because of his black implant, after discovering that the large robot responds to his movement.

Meanwhile, Smythe is speaking with Kate about how he and she could live together before an alarm goes off. Smythe leaves to go see what has happened. A few moments later, Kate tricks a young guard into giving her the keys to the door. Meanwhile, outside, Sean appears to have been caught by the large robot, with Smythe scolding him. Sean then turns the large robot's weapon on Smythe and his team, forcing them to drop their weapons, which are picked up by the other children. Kate suddenly dashes by on a horse, causing Smythe and his team to follow. This opens the line of fire for two "clankers", insectoid robots armed with laser weapons, which destroy the large robot, forcing Sean to hide behind it. One of the clankers then jumps down and prepares to fire at Sean, before Sean takes control of the robot and uses it to destroy the other, before commanding the clanker to deactivate. The children then track down Kate, before heading to the Stone Circle, deciphering a message written in graffiti to find the location of a human camp, an old tin mine. Meanwhile, Smythe is told by Mediator 452, a recurring character in the film, that a large number of deep scanners are arriving and that Smythe will be the first to be scanned if Sean is not captured by the time that they arrive. Sean and his friends are seen arriving at the human camp, where Sean is reunited with his father. The small group has their implants removed.

The next day, the robots descend on the community seeking Sean, who is quickly discovered to be missing. Sean is seen reinstalling his black implant, before mentally controlling a robot craft that rams and destroys the Cube, the local robot mothership, halting the invasion. He narrowly escapes the impact. Smythe tries to escape, but due to the mothership being destroyed the robots do not recognize him as a collaborator and annihilate him. Meanwhile, Sean interfaces with a damaged Mediator, a robot in human form, and mentally sends commands to end the invasion of the Earth, destroying the robots and their craft. The film ends with jubilation as the local population celebrates in town. In the closing scene, Sean looks up at the stars, sensing that the robots will be back. Sean gives a determine look that if and when they do, he'll be waiting.

== Cast ==
- Callan McAuliffe as Sean Flynn
- Ben Kingsley as Robin Smythe
- Gillian Anderson as Kate
- James Tarpey as Nathan
- Milo Parker as Connor
- Ella Hunt as Alexandra
- Craig Garner as Mediator 452
- David McSavage as Donald
- Geraldine James as Monique
- Tamer Hassan as Wayne
- Steven Mackintosh as Danny
- Jonathan McAndrew as VC Teen
- Roy Hudd as Morse Code Martin

== Production ==
The film began principal photography in Wales, the Isle of Man and Northern Ireland, with shooting to include Carrickfergus Castle. Music for the film's end credits is provided by Matan Zohar.

== Release and reception ==
The film was released on 27 March 2015 in the United Kingdom and grossed only £4,147 across 30 sites in its weekend debut. The film was released in the United States on 3 July 2015. Den of Geek referred to the film as a "beguiling homespun invasion tale". Television drama producer Tony Wood described Robot Overlords as "a great British sci-fi brand in the tradition of classics such as 'Quatermass' and 'Doctor Who' — packed with special effects and rebellious excitement." Empire noted that "unlike its titular villains, it's sleek and it never malfunctions." The Guardian compared the film to another well known British science fiction franchise, saying it "plays like a slightly-more sweary episode of Doctor Who." The Telegraph branded it quintessentially British, with its many "plucky" characters, but found the plot to be thin and the robot overlords clumsy and harking back to earlier sci-fi movies: like a "rusty Dr Who episode" with Dalek invasions of Bedfordshire quarries.

On review aggregator website Rotten Tomatoes, the film received an approval rating of 61% based on 18 reviews, with an average rating of 5.7/10. On Metacritic, the film has a weighted average score of 47 out of 100 based on 7 critics, indicating "mixed or average reviews".

== Home media ==
Robot Overlords was released internationally on DVD and Blu-ray in August 2015.

== Novel ==
Victor Gollancz Ltd acquired the rights to publish a novel based on the film. The book, written by scriptwriter and co-creator of the movie Mark Stay, included extra scenes and bonus material not included in the film. It was published in the UK on 12 February 2015 and an audiobook version is read by Rupert Degas.

== Video game ==
Iglu Media created a game called Robot Warlords that is based on Robot Overlords. An action and strategy game, Robot Warlords includes elements of the movie, such as film clips. Available for both iOS and Android, players must flee from robot invaders, dodging attacks and various obstacles.

== TV series ==
London based production company Buccaneer Media signed an agreement to create a television series that will be set in a "parallel universe" to the film. "This series will really expand the canvas of the robot occupation, and we are aiming to make an explosive show that the U.K. will be very proud of," said the film's producer Piers Tempest, whose company Tempo Productions plans to co-produce the series with Buccaneer. As of 2021, there have been no further developments about it.
