= The Salvation (film) =

2014 film by Kristian Levring

- Danish promotional poster
- Directed by: Kristian Levring
- Written by: Anders Thomas Jensen; Kristian Levring
- Produced by: Sisse Graum Jørgensen
- Starring: Mads Mikkelsen; Eva Green; Eric Cantona; Mikael Persbrandt; Douglas Henshall; Michael Raymond-James; Jeffrey Dean Morgan; Jonathan Pryce
- Cinematography: Jens Schlosser
- Edited by: Pernille Bech Christensen
- Music by: Kasper Winding
- Production companies: Zentropa Entertainments 33; Forward Films; Spier Films; Danish Film Institute; Nordisk Film & TV Fond; Film i Väst
- Distributed by: Nordisk Film (Denmark); Warner Bros. Pictures (United Kingdom); Universal Pictures (South Africa, Eastern Europe and Latin America)
- Release dates: 17 May 2014 (Cannes); 22 May 2014 (Denmark)
- Running time: 92 minutes
- Countries: Denmark; United Kingdom; South Africa
- Languages: English, Danish, Spanish
- Budget: €10.5 million
- Box office: $44,903

The Salvation is a 2014 Danish Western film directed by Kristian Levring and written by Anders Thomas Jensen and Levring. The film stars Mads Mikkelsen, Eva Green, Jeffrey Dean Morgan, Jonathan Pryce, Eric Cantona, Mikael Persbrandt, Douglas Henshall and Michael Raymond-James.

== Plot ==
Following the Second Schleswig War of 1864, Danish war veterans Jon and his brother Peter emigrate to the United States from Denmark and settle somewhere between the Mississippi River and the Rocky Mountains. Seven years later, in 1871, Jon's wife, Marie and his 10-year-old son, Kresten, arrive. After they all meet, Jon and his family board a stagecoach bound for their small residence while Peter stays behind. Their coach is also boarded by recently released criminals, Paul and Lester. Following a tense struggle, the criminals throw Jon out of the moving coach after which they rape and kill Jon's wife. They also kill his son and the stagecoach driver and guard.

With great effort, Jon catches up to the coach to find his family murdered. Enraged, he kills the two convicts. Unbeknownst to Jon, Paul is the brother of Henry Delarue, a notorious gang leader and land baron. Upon hearing the news, Delarue kills three innocent citizens of Black Creek, the town that reports the deaths to him. He also forces the townspeople to cooperate and find his brother's killer. Delarue was once an army colonel who fought Native Americans. At one point, he is stated to have once been a good man before he became twisted by war.

After burying his wife and son, Jon decides to leave the town with Peter and sells his land to Keane, Black Creek's mayor and undertaker. Before they can leave, Jon and Peter are captured by the town sheriff and minister, Mallick. As Jon sits in his cell, Mallick tells him that his death will buy the town more time while he tries to inform higher authorities of Delarue's actions. Meanwhile, it is revealed that Delarue is working with the Standard Atlantic Oil Company and, with the help of Mayor Keane, had been acquiring Black Creek and its surrounding land, which is rich with untapped crude oil. Unknown to Mallick, the company managed to intercept his message for help and prevent it from reaching the authorities. Delarue's now widowed sister-in-law Madelaine, who is mute, acts as his accountant and suffers sexual and physical abuse from him.

The next morning, Jon is escorted to Delarue's base, an abandoned town, and is tied to a post and left in the sun. In Black Creek, Peter breaks out of jail and kills several of Delarue's henchmen. He cuts Jon free, and the pair ride off while being pursued by Delarue and his remaining men. Realizing Jon is too weak to carry on, Peter conceals him and leads the gang away, and is eventually caught and killed. Taking advantage of Delarue's absence, Madelaine steals his cash and boards a train. However, the train is intercepted, and she is captured. Delarue tells his men to kill Madelaine after they are done raping her.

Jon roams the countryside, looking for water and shelter. He stumbles across a small residence belonging to Mrs. Whistler, whose husband was killed by Delarue. Jon takes shelter in her house to recover from his wounds while Mrs. Whistler and her children flee. After returning to town, he confronts and kills Mayor Keane for his deception. At the general store, he arms himself and reluctantly accepts the help of Voichek, the young storekeeper whose grandmother was killed by Delarue.

Jon uses diversions and guerrilla tactics to kill Delarue's henchmen one at a time. Voichek is killed and inadvertently sets fire to the hotel where Madelaine is being held, enabling her to escape. Delarue finds and wounds Jon. Just as he is about to kill Jon, Madelaine shoots Delarue twice, and Jon finishes him with a shot to the head. Sheriff Mallick and his deputies arrive at the scene and thank Jon. When they try to arrest Madelaine, Jon orders them to leave and states that he will be taking her with him. The pair leave together, and the film then reveals that the land is ultimately taken over by the oil company.

== Cast ==
- Mads Mikkelsen as Jon, the Royal Danish Army combat veteran of the Second Schleswig War, Wild West homesteader, and the protagonist of the film
- Eva Green as Madelaine, Delarue's mute, widowed, and severely battered sister-in-law
- Jeffrey Dean Morgan as Henry Delarue, a former Union Army Colonel in the American Civil War, and native American fighter and now a corrupt and homicidal gang leader and land pirate.
- Eric Cantona as The Corsican, Delarue's main enforcer
- Mikael Persbrandt as Peter, Jon's brother
- Douglas Henshall as Sheriff Mallick
- Michael Raymond-James as Paul Delarue
- Jonathan Pryce as Mayor Keane
- Alex Arnold as Voichek
- Nanna Øland Fabricius as Marie, Jon's wife
- Toke Lars Bjarke as Kresten, Jon and Marie's son
- Sean Cameron Michael as Lester
- Carl Nel as Stagecoach Whip
- Sivan Raphaely as Mrs. Delgado
- Grant Swanby as Joe No Legs
- Robert Hobbs as Silvertooth
- Adam Neill as Mr. Bradley
- Langley Kirkwood as Man with Beard

== Production ==
Principal photography began on 8 April 2013 in Johannesburg, South Africa.

== Reception ==
On review aggregator website Rotten Tomatoes, The Salvation has a rating of 72% based on 78 reviews, with an average rating of 6.4/10. The site's critical consensus reads, "It's all but impossible to add anything new or fresh to the traditional Western, but – thanks in no small part to Mads Mikkelsen's performance – The Salvation comes close." On Metacritic the film has a score of 64 out of a 100 based on 19 critics, signifying "generally favorable reviews".

In The Observer, Jonathan Romney found that the film "tips its Stetson to John Ford and Sergio Leone with bold widescreen visuals – daytime shots in which even the sun looks sunbaked, prairie nightscapes resembling ink-soaked denim", but added "it never transcends reverent pastiche, down to the hackneyed sounds of Morricone-style guitars". Romney concluded, "Best reason to see The Salvation: its chief varmint, played with ornery glint and bristling whiskers by Jeffrey Dean Morgan, who has the sleepy-eyed malignity of vintage western heavy Jack Elam".
