= The Bestseller Experiment =

Literary podcast

The Bestseller Experiment is a podcast by two writers, Mark Stay and Mark Desvaux, who each week discuss different aspects of writing and publishing with guests from the publishing industry, such as other authors, editors, or marketing experts.

== Premise ==
The two Marks challenged themselves to write and publish a bestselling novel within a year. The first year of the podcast followed their progress with the novel that became Back to Reality, and how they marketed the book. This was published as an ebook on 13 October 2017 and achieved bestseller status in ten Amazon Kindle categories worldwide.

The podcast continued, with the aid of support from Patreon subscribers, and in 2019 the two Marks set themselves another goal, to sell 10,000 copies of the book before Glastonbury 2019 (the Glastonbury Festival appears in Back to Reality).

== Notable episodes ==
EP00, the first, teaser podcast, went out on 14 October 2016.

In a poll of listeners, EP22 (otherwise known as The Great Bollocking) was voted readers' favourite. The interviewee was author Ben Aaronovitch who, on discovering that the two Marks had written an outline 50,000 words long, gave them an epic rant about stopping outlining and getting writing.

The most shared episode was EP06, in which Breaking Bad actor Bryan Cranston said he would move to Canada if Donald Trump became president.

== Awards/media coverage ==
The Guardian newspaper published an article in November 2016, outlining the challenge and their approach. They got another mention in May 2017, in an article discussing Amazon's bestseller lists. They have also been mentioned in the Independent, and their episode with Bryan Cranston (see above) got worldwide coverage.

The podcast was shortlisted for the Futurebook Podcast of the year 2018, although it didn't win, and in 2018 was mentioned by BuzzFeed as a podcast to listen to.
