= Forward Films =

British film production company

Forward Films is a British-based film production company founded by producers Tracy Brimm and Kate Myers. So far they have produced the feature films Tormented starring Alex Pettyfer and Tuppence Middleton, Skeletons starring Jason Isaacs and in 2011 they completed filming on their third feature film, the Irish monster movie Grabbers starring Richard Coyle, Russell Tovey and newcomer Ruth Bradley.

== Filmography ==
- The Salvation (2014)
