= The Kindred (2021 film) =

British horror film

- Directed by: Jamie Patterson
- Written by: Christian J. Hearn
- Produced by: Stephen Jarvis; Tracy Jarvis
- Starring: April Pearson; Samantha Bond; James Cosmo; Patrick Bergin; James Dreyfus; Blake Harrison; Robbie Gee
- Edited by: David Fricker
- Music by: Moritz Schmittat
- Release date: 2021
- Running time: 94 minutes
- Country: United Kingdom
- Language: English

The Kindred is a 2021 British psychological horror film written by Christian J. Hearn and directed by Jamie Patterson that stars April Pearson, Samantha Bond, James Cosmo, Patrick Bergin, James Dreyfus, Blake Harrison and Robbie Gee. It was released on 26 August 2021.

== Synopsis ==
Haunted by spirits after her father's suicide, an amnesiac woman discovers that he may have murdered her children.

== Reception ==
On the review aggregator website Rotten Tomatoes, the film has an approval rating of 64%, based on 14 reviews, with an average rating of 5.9/10.
