= Howl (2015 film) =

- Film poster
- Directed by: Paul Hyett
- Written by: Mark Huckerby; Nick Ostler
- Produced by: Harsh King; Martin Gentles
- Starring: Ed Speleers; Sean Pertwee; Holly Weston; Shauna Macdonald; Elliot Cowan; Rosie Day; Calvin Dean; Duncan Preston; Ross Mullan
- Cinematography: Adam Biddle
- Edited by: Agnieszka Liggett
- Music by: Paul E. Francis
- Distributed by: Starchild Pictures; Pathé
- Release dates: 5 August 2015 (Fantasy Filmfest); 16 October 2015 (United Kingdom)
- Running time: 92 minutes
- Country: United Kingdom
- Language: English
- Budget: $1.9 million
- Box office: $477,656

Howl is a 2015 British horror film directed by Paul Hyett and starring Ed Speleers, Sean Pertwee, Holly Weston, Shauna Macdonald, Elliot Cowan, Rosie Day, Calvin Dean, Duncan Preston and Ross Mullan.

== Plot ==
Alpha Trax train guard Joe Griffin is forced by his supervisor into an extra shift on an overnight passenger train scheduled to depart London at midnight after the scheduled guard calls in sick. Also working on the train is Ellen, who runs the tea-trolley. A few miles before reaching the final station, Eastborough, the train makes an emergency stop in a remote forested area. The driver leaves the train to check the situation and finds a dead deer stuck to the wheels. As he struggles to remove it, a creature emerges from the woods and attacks and kills him. The remaining passengers - standoffish Kate, assertive Adrian, bookish Matthew, streetwise Billy, teenager Nina, slobbish Paul, and elderly couple Ged and Jenny - are frustrated to learn that an emergency team will not be able to reach the train for hours due to a storm having downed trees all along the line. The group convinces a reluctant Joe and Ellen into letting them off the train to attempt to walk to Eastborough instead. Joe and Ellen find the driver's eviscerated body as they walk through the woods. As they rush everyone back to the train, the creature pursues them and bites Jenny's leg.

As the others bandage Jenny's wound, Joe tries to call for help again but receives no response, and none of the passengers have cell phone reception due to a broken antenna on the train's roof. Billy, an aspiring engineer, determines that the fuel lines are damaged and leaking, and thinks the train could get moving again if repaired. The creature tries to force its way into the cabin but can not penetrate the metal roof or double-paned windows. When it climbs up on the train's roof, the cell phone reception comes back and Nina's phone rings. When she moves into a less secure area of the car to answer it, the creature smashes through the window and pulls her out.

The remaining passengers barricade themselves in another car, using the train's onboard power tools to reinforce the windows and doors with metal grates. Paul separates from the group to use the toilet and is killed when the creature breaks through the bathroom roof. It then breaks through the makeshift barricades, and attacks the group, but they band together and manage to kill it. Matthew recognizes the creature as a werewolf. Reasoning that someone bitten by a werewolf will become one, Adrian tries to kill Jenny, who is becoming disoriented, coughing up blood, and spitting out her teeth. Joe knocks Adrian unconscious, then has the others tie him up along with Jenny.

As a pack of three more werewolves converge on the train, drawn by the other's death cries, Billy and Joe attempt to exact repairs. As Joe and Ellen monitor the console, Matthew keeps watch outside while Billy attempts to patch the leaking fuel line. Matthew then hears Nina calling for help in the forest and goes to find her. He soon discovers Nina being eaten alive by a werewolf, and he is attacked and killed himself. As Billy completes his repairs and the train begins to move again, one of the werewolves grabs Kate and Adrian kicks her out of the open door to protect himself and she is killed by the pack.

Jenny eventually fully transforms into a werewolf and kills Ged, then attacks Adrian, but Joe kills her, saving Adrian. Eventually the fuel line begins leaking again and the train stops once more, allowing the werewolves to catch up and board the train. Adrian traps Joe and Ellen to cover his own escape, leaving them to die. Billy arrives and tries to fight off the werewolves with a makeshift torch, but is killed, and Joe and Ellen flee into the forest pursued by the pack. Realizing they will not make it, Joe stays behind to buy Ellen time, and although he fights bravely, he is overwhelmed and bitten while Ellen safely makes it to the Eastborough station on foot. Shortly after, Adrian, who has been stumbling through the woods, is found by the pack and attacked and killed by the newly transformed Joe.

== Cast ==
- Ed Speleers as Joe, the train guard
- Holly Weston as Ellen, the tea-trolley worker
- Sean Pertwee as Train Driver Tony
- Shauna Macdonald as Kate, a divorced mom, frazzled and having a rough evening.
- Elliot Cowan as Adrian, confident businessman with few morals.
- Amit Shah as Matthew, a passenger engrossed in a novel.
- Sam Gittins as Billy, an engineering student.
- Rosie Day as Nina, an inconsiderate train passenger.
- Duncan Preston as Ged, a senior citizen who is married to Jenny.
- Ania Marson as Jenny, a senior citizen who is married to Ged.
- Calvin Dean as Paul, a drunken football yob
- Brett Goldstein as David, Joe's new Supervisor
- Ryan Oliva as Scar Werewolf
- Robert Nairne as Hunchback Werewolf
- Ross Mullan as Blonde Werewolf

== Production ==
Howl was directed by Paul Hyett, previously known for his effects collaborations with fellow British horror film director Neil Marshall.

== Release ==
The film had no theatrical release but was shown at several international film festivals before its release on home video. Howl premiered at Fantasy Filmfest, which was held in Germany on 5 August 2015. It was subsequently shown at FrightFest in the United Kingdom on 31 August, and Popcorn Frights Film Festival in the United States on 3 October. The DVD was released on 26 October.

== Reception ==
The film has a 63% rating on Rotten Tomatoes based on 16 reviews.

Kate Muir of The Times negatively likened the film to Snakes on a Plane, giving it two out of five stars and calling the werewolves unconvincing.

Luiz H. C., one of the critics of horror film magazine and website Bloody Disgusting, rated it three-and-a-half out of five stars and, although he criticized the use of CGI, said that it was unexpectedly entertaining. Pat Torfe, also of Bloody Disgusting, gave the film four out of five stars and said that it was the best werewolf film since Dog Soldiers, though it plays it safer than that film.

Kim Newman of Empire gave the film three out of five stars and said that it is "an unashamed B-movie, but fun". Mark Kermode of The Observer wrote, "Engagingly sympathetic portrayals of stoical working women and harassed railway guards keep us on side as the action rattles through familiar generic junctions." Hannah McGill of The List wrote, "The black humour hits home without breaking the tension, while the gore – as one might expect given Hyett's background in makeup effects – is grimly convincing." Garry McConnachie of The Daily Record criticized what he felt were annoying characters and a failed opportunity to make use of a confined setting. However, called Howl "thoroughly entertaining" and praised Hyett's direction and Speleers's acting.

Mark McConnell of paranormal magazine Fortean Times gave the movie 8 out of 10, saying: "The film's climax made me wonder if it wasn't the director's exploration of interpersonal relationships between men and women that made me want to watch it a second time. Hats off to Hyett, who has taken the mundane British Rail journey and turned it into a feast of bloody horror."
