= Kevin Lehane =

Irish screenwriter

Kevin Lehane is an Irish screenwriter. In 2009, his speculative screenplay Grabbers was listed on the Brit List and in late 2010 it began production marking his feature film debut. In 2013, he was nominated for a Writers' Guild of Great Britain Award for Best First Feature and an IFTA Award for his script to Grabbers at the 10th Annual Irish Film and Television Academy awards.
