= Calvin Dean =

British actor (born 1985)

- Born: 21 May 1985 (age 41); Truro, Cornwall, England
- Occupation: Actor
- Years active: 2007–present

Calvin Dean (born 21 May 1985) is an English screen and stage actor.

== Early life ==
Dean was born in Truro, Cornwall. He grew up in Polruan, Cornwall, attending Polruan Primary School and later Fowey Community College. His mother, Lorraine, worked as a teaching assistant and nanny, and his father, Graham, worked for a local harbour commissioner and was a lighthouse keeper. He heard about the National Youth Theatre while in secondary school. After successfully auditioning, he stayed with the company from 2001 to 2005. During this time, he appeared in productions including The Threepenny Opera, Murder in the Cathedral and Hanging Around at the National Theatre. From 2004 to 2007, he trained at the Mountview Academy of Theatre Arts in London, graduating with a BA (Hons) in Acting.

== Career ==
Dean made his professional debut in The Duchess (2008), opposite Keira Knightley. He played Darren Mullet, his first lead role, in the comedy-horror film Tormented (2009). Dean received critical acclaim for his performance in Tormented. Sky Movies said: "Best of the bunch is Dean as the put-upon Darren Mullet, imbuing his tragic monster with a touch of Boris Karloff pathos in the online clips of his living torment, and coming across quite menacing when returning to slice up his victims."

Dean's television credits include the Neil Gaiman penned "Cyberman" episode of Doctor Who alongside Warwick Davis, Tamzin Outhwaite, and Jason Watkins. This was the first time Dean and Matt Smith had worked together since being members of The National Youth Theatre together in 2003. Dean's other credits include Demons, Casualty, The Sarah Jane Adventures, Law & Order: UK and the BBC drama Dancing on the Edge written and directed by Stephen Poliakoff.

Dean starred in Kneehigh Theatre's Fup in 2016, Simon Harvey's adaptation of a novel by Jim Dodge, it received a four star rating from The Times, and was performed at the Lost Gardens of Heligan in Cornwall in 2016. Dean will return to the Kneehigh in 2018 for a UK tour of Fup.

Dean won Best Actor at the Eindhoven Film Festival, Brussels Short Film Festival and the Hyperwave Film Awards in Los Angeles for his work in the short film Make Aliens Dance.

Dean appears in the Russell T. Davies Channel 4 drama It's a Sin and plays young Ted in the BBC drama Strike.

== Filmography ==
Filmography
Year	Title	Role	Notes
2008	The Duchess	Devonshire House Servant	Film
2008	Casualty	Michael Treaver	TV
2008	Demons	Mouse Man	TV
2009	Just For The Record	Crackers	Film
2009	The Sarah Jane Adventures	Chris (Slitheen)	TV
2009	Playstar	Chris	Film
2009	Suicide Kids	Subzero	Lead
2009	Tormented	Darren Mullet	Lead
2011	Law & Order: UK	Barry	TV
2012	Dancing On The Edge	Frank	TV
2012	Passengers	Rog	Lead
2013	TeamXtreme	Slimpossible Leader	TV
2013	Don't Move	Graham	Short Film
2013	Doctor Who	Ha-Ha	TV (Series 7, Episode 12)
2015	Howl	Paul the drunken football lout	Film
2015	Fractured	Errol	Film
2018	Make Aliens Dance	Murphy	Film
2018	Trauma	Dave Saunders	TV
2021	It's a Sin	Clifford	TV
2022	Elden Ring	Boc/Nomadic merchant 2	Video game
2022	Strike	Young Ted	TV

== Awards and nominations ==
Year	Award	Category	Work	Result
2018	Brussels Short Film Festival	Best Actor	Make Aliens Dance	Won
2018	Eindhoven Film Festival	Best Actor	Make Aliens Dance	Won
2019	Hyperwave Film Awards	Best Actor	Make Aliens Dance	Won
