= Grabbers =

2012 Irish-British monster film by Jon Wright

- Theatrical film poster
- Directed by: Jon Wright
- Written by: Kevin Lehane
- Produced by: Tracy Brimm; Kate Myers; Martina Niland
- Starring: Richard Coyle; Ruth Bradley; Russell Tovey
- Cinematography: Trevor Forrest
- Edited by: Matt Platts-Mills
- Music by: Christian Henson
- Production companies: Forward Films; UK Film Council; Irish Film Board; Limelight; High Treason; Nvizible; Samson Films
- Distributed by: Sony Pictures Home Entertainment (United Kingdom); Element Pictures (Ireland)
- Release date: 23 January 2012 (Sundance)
- Running time: 94 minutes
- Countries: United Kingdom; Ireland
- Language: English
- Budget: $5.3 million
- Box office: $440,821

Grabbers is a 2012 monster horror comedy film directed by Jon Wright and written by Kevin Lehane. A co-production of Ireland and the United Kingdom, the film stars Richard Coyle, Ruth Bradley, Bronagh Gallagher and Russell Tovey among an ensemble cast of Irish actors.

Grabbers premiered at the Sundance Film Festival in 2012, and received mostly positive reviews upon release.

== Plot ==
Ciarán O'Shea (Richard Coyle), an alcoholic Garda is assigned to a new partner, Lisa Nolan (Ruth Bradley), a workaholic. His resentment only grows when Nolan, seeking to impress her superiors, volunteers for temporary duty at a remote Irish island.

After discovering mutilated whale corpses, the quiet community slowly comes to realise that they're under attack by bloodsucking tentacled aliens creatures which they dub "Grabbers".

Paddy (Lalor Roddy), the town drunk, inexplicably survives an attack. Local marine ecologist, Dr. Smith (Russell Tovey), theorizes that his high blood alcohol content proved toxic to the Grabbers, which survive on blood and water.

O'Shea contacts the mainland, but an oncoming storm prevents any escape or help. The group also realizes rising water levels will allow the remaining large male Grabber to invade the island. To prevent panic and chaos, Nolan and O'Shea organize a party at the local pub, intending to keep the island's residents safe but unaware of the danger. Brian Maher (David Pearse), the pub owner, offers free drinks, attracting locals to the party. While people get drunk, O'Shea volunteers to stay sober to coordinate the town's defenses.

In a squad car outside, a drunken Nolan reveals to O'Shea that she has come to the island to escape the shadow of her more-favoured sister. She also admits having feelings for O'Shea despite turning down his advances earlier.

When the large grabber arrives, a drunken Smith leaves the pub to get a picture, believing his inebriated state will protect him. However, the monster throws him into the air and kills him. Nolan and O'Shea escape to the pub, where they try to protect the townspeople. While trying to reassure people, Nolan drunkenly reveals the danger they are in. The panicked islanders retreat to the second level of the pub, and baby grabbers take over the first floor. Nolan accidentally sets the pub on fire while trying to sneak out, but she and O'Shea manage to draw the attention of the adult grabber.

O'Shea and Nolan drive to a construction site, pursued by the creature. They plan to strand the monster on dry land, depriving it of water. Before they can successfully set a trap, the monster attacks O'Shea, injuring him. Nolan uses the heavy construction equipment pinning the creature at the base of a pit. It grabs O'Shea, but he dumps a bottle of Paddy's poitín into its mouth, sickening it and causing it to release him. Nolan ignites nearby explosives with a flare gun, killing the Grabber.

As the storm clears up, O'Shea throws away his flask, and the two return to town. Unknown to anyone, more Grabber eggs buried on the beach are about to hatch.

== Cast ==
- Richard Coyle as Garda Ciarán O'Shea
- Ruth Bradley as Garda Lisa Nolan
- Russell Tovey as Dr. Smith
- Lalor Roddy as Paddy Barrett
- David Pearse as Brian Maher
- Bronagh Gallagher as Una Maher
- Pascal Scott as Dr Jim Gleeson
- Ned Dennehy as Declan Cooney
- Clelia Murphy as Irene Murphy
- Louis Dempsey as Tadhg Murphy
- Stuart Graham as Skipper
- Micheál Ó Gruagáin as Father Potts
- Darran Watt as Tommy (Islander)

== Release ==
The film premièred at the 2012 Sundance Film Festival and played at the Edinburgh International Film Festival in June 2012. The film continued its festival run across the world screening at Karlovy Vary International Film Festival, Taormina Film Fest, Fantasia Film Festival, PIFAN, Sitges, Toronto After Dark Film Festival, Strasbourg European Fantastic Film Festival, London FrightFest Film Festival and held its Irish première in July 2012 as the opening film of the 24th Galway Film Fleadh.

== Reception ==
=== Critical response ===
On Rotten Tomatoes the film has an approval rating of 72% based on reviews from 32 critics, with an average rating of 6.23/10. On Metacritic it has a score of 62 out of 100 based on reviews from 12 critics, indicating "generally favorable reviews".

Damon Wise of Empire film magazine described it as "a romantic but surprisingly scary monster movie that feels like a lost Amblin flick, shaken and stirred with a dash of The Guard. ... a finely crafted tribute to a long-lost style of filmmaking [that] stands up in its own right too." Matt Glasby of Total Film rated it 3/5 stars and called it "a bright, breezy Irish monster mash boasting gorgeous cinematography, appealing performances and great SFX". Gareth Jones of DreadCentral rated it 4/5 stars and said, "it is one hell of a good time that offers plenty of laughs, excellent characters and performances, and big slimy monsters." Jordan Hoffman of US cable channel IFC summed the film up as "a delightful romp", while Upcoming Movies gave it four stars and called it a "fun, monster movie roller coaster" with a "mix of laughs and scares". The Daily Telegraph's Robbie Collin called it a "cherishable Irish B-picture ... with an unimprovable premise".

Kim Newman of Screen Daily said of the film: "Kevin Lehane's smart script is canny enough to sidestep the expectations of fans who might think they know how films like this are supposed to play out, while the monsters are as well-realised as anything in far more costly productions." Donald Clarke of The Irish Times said, "Grabbers has an atmosphere all its own: the humour is earthy without being patronising; the action sequences are both absurd and properly exciting." Peter Bradshaw of The Guardian rated the film 3/5 stars and described it as "a likable and technically impressive comedy-horror" that is "fantastically silly, often funny". Sam Adams of The A.V. Club rated the film B− and criticized the film's climax as "a letdown" and "cheap imitation" compared to the first half's "sharp-edged parody". Marc Mohan of The Oregonian rated it C− and called it "a one-dimensional, one-joke film." In a negative review for Variety, Dennis Harvey called the film polished and watchable, but criticized the writing as "pretty tepid, middlebrow stuff". Nigel Andrews of the Financial Times rated it 1/5 stars and said, "For a horror comedy it needed some comedy and some horror."

=== Accolades ===
At the Edinburgh International Film Festival, it was announced as one of the "Best of the Fest" of the 2012 line-up. At the Strasbourg European Fantastic Film Festival, it won the Audience Prize for Best Film, and at NIFFF, it won two awards: the Audience Award for best film and the Titra Film Award.

The film picked up two 2014 Fangoria Chainsaw Award nominations for Best Script for Kevin Lehane and Best Creature/FX for Shaune Harrison and Paddy Eason. It was also nominated for a Writers' Guild of Great Britain Award for Best First Feature for Kevin Lehane as well as for four IFTAs at the 2013 Irish Film and Television Awards. Bronagh Gallagher for Best Supporting Actress, Kevin Lehane for Best Feature Script, producers David Collins and Martina Niland of Samson Films, alongside Forward Films and High Treason Productions were nominated for Best Film and Ruth Bradley was nominated and won for Best Actress.
