= Jon Wright =

Film director from Northern Ireland

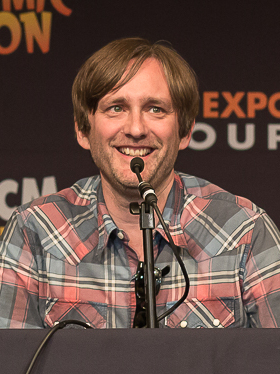
- Wright on the Robot Overlords panel at MCM London Comic Con
- Born: United Kingdom
- Occupations: Film director; television director; screenwriter

Jon Wright is a Northern Irish television and film director and screenwriter, known for his work in the horror and science fiction genres.

== Career ==
Wright is known for directing the British low budget horror comedy Tormented starring Alex Pettyfer and the Irish monster movie Grabbers. He directed and co-wrote the science fiction adventure film Robot Overlords starring Ben Kingsley. The estimated budget was $21 million. The film began principal photography in Wales, the Isle of Man and Northern Ireland.

Reuniting with Mark Stay, Wright then co-wrote and directed Unwelcome, a fantasy horror film. Wright was inspired by the Grimm fairytales and stories from his own Irish grandfather. Wright described it as a "home invasion movie" and pitched it as "Gremlins meets Straw Dogs". The film uses many of the same production members as his previous film Grabbers. Unwelcome was released in Ireland and the United Kingdom on 27 January 2023, in the United States on 10 March 2023, and on digital on 14 March 2023 by Warner Bros. Pictures. It was previously scheduled for 4 February 2022, before being moved up to 28 October 2022, then to its eventual release date.

Wright has also directed multiple episodes of television, beginning with Ordinary Lies. He then worked on series such as The Good Karma Hospital, Our Girl, Brassic and most recently, The Wayfinders.
