= Shirley Jaffe (actress) =

British actress (1934–2022)

- Born: 1934; Hendon, England
- Died: 12 October 2022 (aged 87–88)
- Occupation: Actress
- Years active: 1954–2022
- Television: Little Britain; The First Lady; Emergency-Ward 10

Shirley Matilda Jaffe (born Shirley Matilda Jacobs; 1934 – 12 October 2022) was a British actress. She trained at the Central School of Speech and Drama, before embarking on a career on stage and screen, most famously appearing in Stanley Kubrick's A Clockwork Orange. After a lengthy break raising a family, she returned to professional acting in 2002.

== Life and career ==
Shirley Matilda Jacobs was born in Hendon in 1934. She trained at the Central School of Speech & Drama in 1954, and among other jobs was in the first British Theatre in the Round Company at Scarborough with Stephen Joseph and later Alan Ayckbourn, and in the last year of long running TV serial Emergency Ward 10 as Nurse Angela Foster.

Her film career began in 1970 as a maid in Peter Sasdy's Taste the Blood of Dracula. In 1971 she made a brief appearance in Stanley Kubrick's film A Clockwork Orange. Some sources erroneously identify her as the Billy Boy's gang victim, but she played a nurse who helps administer the first round of Ludovico's treatment to Alex (Malcolm McDowell). Skybreak, the home she then shared with her husband Tony, was also featured in the film, as the interior location for the scene in which Alex's gang attacks a writer and his wife (played by Patrick Magee and Adrienne Corri) in A Clockwork Orange was Shirley's last film appearance for close to 35 years.

Jaffe appeared on television in Michael Jackson's Earth Song music video, and as a Greek nun in Little Britain Abroad. She directed and acted in plays in Brighton, Edinburgh, The West End and Helsinki festivals and most recently played Irene in award-winning British feature Ambleton Delight. She was nominated for a Star award in the Brighton Fringe for her performance as "Nana" in the new musical, Here Comes the Bride.

Jaffe died on 12 October 2022.

== Filmography ==
Films
Year	Title	Role	Note
2020	A Safe Place	Margaret	
2018	Nurse Shirley Foster	Shirley Foster	Short
2017	Autumn Patrol	Church Woman	Short
2014	Home for Christmas	Mrs. Blackstick	
2014	Bloom	Old Woman	Short
2009	Ambleton Delight	Irene Phillips	
1971	A Clockwork Orange	Nurse	
1970	Taste the Blood of Dracula	Hargood's Maid	
1956	The Secret Tent	Girl in remand home	Uncredited
1954	The Passing Stranger		Uncredited

Television
Year	Title	Role	Note
2017	Safeguarding of Vulnerable Adults	Margarert	Episode: SOVA 1
2006	Little Britain		Episodes: Little Britain Aboard: Part 1, Little Britain Abroad: Part 2
1977	Secret Army	Mrs. Schliemann	Episode: Radishes with Butter
1973	Softly Softly: Task Force	Miss Daniels	Episode: Interrogation
1969	The First Lady	Miss Sims	Episode: I'm Talking About Us
1966–1967	Emergency–Ward 10	Nurse Foster	Episodes: Heaven Is a Little Farther, A Family Likeness, Second Sight, Hide Me Hide Me, A Step in the Right Direction, Go West Young Man
