= Gina Costigan =

Irish actress (born 1984)

- Born: 21 March 1984 (age 42); Dublin, Ireland
- Education: Queens University Belfast (B.A.); Royal Academy of Dramatic Art
- Occupation: Actress
- Years active: 1994 – present
- Parents: John Costigan (father); Maria McDermottroe (mother)

Gina Costigan (born 21 March 1984) is an Irish actress of stage and screen. She appeared in the original Broadway companies of Jez Butterworth's The Ferryman (2018) and Martin McDonagh's Hangmen (2022), and starred as Grace Hardy in the 2023 UK national tour of Brian Friel's Faith Healer.

Her film appearances include Veronica Guerin (2003), Becoming Jane (2007) A Terrible Beauty (2013), Halal Daddy (2017) and My Sailor, My Love (2023). On television, she’s had guest and recurring roles on Fair City (2007), Vikings (2019-2020), Harry Wild (2022), Kin (2023), and Law & Order: SVU (2024-2025).

In 2019, Costigan was named to The Irish Echo's 40 Under 40 for emerging Irish talent. She frequently appears in both English and Irish language roles.

== Early life and education ==
Born in Dublin, Ireland, Costigan is the daughter of theatre producer John Costigan and actress Maria McDermottroe. Raised primarily in Dún Laoghaire, she attended a Gaelscoil.

She made her professional stage debut as a child performer in the 1994 revival of James Plunkett's The Risen People at The Gaiety Theatre, directed by brothers Peter and Jim Sheridan. At the time, the production was the most expensive in the history of the Dublin Theatre Festival. In 1997, she appeared as Jenny in Brian Ó Riagáin's Irish-language play Buille an Phíce at the Andrews Lane Theatre.

Costigan later earned a B.A. (Hons) from Queen's University Belfast's School of Arts, English and Languages before studying acting at the Royal Academy of Dramatic Art.

== Career ==
=== 2003-2013: Early stage & screen work ===
During the 2000s and early 2010s, Costigan began working extensively in Irish theatre, frequently appearing in both English and Irish-language productions. Her stage work during this period included two national tours of Máiréad Ní Ghráda's An Triail with Aisling Ghéar Theatre Company (2008, 2012), as well as premieres of new plays at Project Arts Centre, Smock Alley Theatre, and the Town Hall Theatre. In 2003, Costigan made her screen debut as Molly, the girlfriend of Irish crime figure John Traynor in Joel Schumacher's Veronica Guerin, appearing opposite Cate Blanchett and Ciarán Hinds. The film received eight nominations from the Irish Film & Television Academy. In 2007, she had a recurring role as Diane Sutton on the RTÉ drama series Fair City and appeared as Caroline Austen in Julian Jarrold's Becoming Jane, starring Anne Hathaway. Costigan would later note in a profile with Hot Press, that the majority of her role in the film "ended up on the cutting room floor." From 2011 through 2012, Costigan starred in the world premiere of Isobel Mahon's Billy the Boat Loves Angelina at Liberty Hall Theatre and the The New Theatre, Dublin. In a review for The Irish Times, drama critic Peter Crawley noted "Costigan gives an assured performance while portraying a menacing figure with admirable bite." During this period, she continued to alternate between theatre and screen work, appearing in Keith Farrell's Irish-language docudrama Áille an Uafáisy, as well as Gráinne Curistan's Les Impossibles at the Edinburgh Festival Fringe.

=== 2014-2019: Broadway & Off-Broadway ===
In 2013, Costigan moved to New York City to study at the New York Conservatory for Dramatic Arts. She subsequently began working in New York theatre, making her Off-Broadway debut as Hen in Eileen Connolly's Daughter of the Waves at the New York Musical Theatre Festival. She later appeared in the world premiere of Honor Molloy's Crackskull Row at the Irish Repertory Theatre, followed by Teresa Deevy's The Suitcase Under the Bed at the Mint Theater Company. Both productions were named Critics' Picks by The New York Times. In a review for the latter, Stanford Friedman of New York Theatre Guide noted "Gina Costigan, as Mrs. Stims, shines the brightest." In 2018, Costigan appeared opposite Academy Award-winner Hayley Mills in the U.S. premiere of Isobel Mahon's Party Face at New York City Center. For their respective performances, Costigan and Mills were both nominated for Best Actress at the 2018 1st Irish Awards. Tim Teeman of The Daily Beast noted "Gina Costigan’s excellent performance is the layered heart of the play." The same year, she was cast in the original Broadway company of Jez Butterworth's The Ferryman, understudying the roles of Caitlin and Mary Carney. The production later won the Tony Award for Best Play. During this period, Costigan had recurring roles on the television series The Marvelous Mrs. Maisel on Amazon Prime Video (2017), and Vikings on the History Channel (2019-2020), as well as a supporting role in the feature film Halal Daddy (2017). In 2019, she was named to The Irish Echo's 40 Under 40 for emerging Irish talent.

=== 2020-present: Later stage & screen work ===
In 2020, Costigan appeared in Joe Crilly's On McQuillan's Hill at the Finborough Theatre in London, England. The production received critical acclaim, earning five stars from the Morning Star and four stars from The Stage. In a review for The Arts Desk, drama critic Rachel Halliburton noted "In a play distinguished, not least, by its strong female characters, it is Gina Costigan’s Loretta who particularly shines." During the COVID-19 pandemic, she portrayed Molly Bloom in The Ulysses Project, a digitally produced adaptation of Ulysses featuring more than 75 performers. The film was later screened by the Irish Film Institute, as part of their Bloomsday Centennial celebration. In 2022, Costigan joined the original Broadway company of Martin McDonagh's Hangmen. The production was nominated for the Tony Award for Best Play. Shortly thereafter she portrayed the titular role in Seán Ó Muireagáin's Luaithríona, an Irish language panto adaption of Cinderella at Cultúrlann McAdam Ó Fiaich in Belfast. In 2023, Costigan starred as Grace in the UK national tour of Brian Friel's Faith Healer. In a review for Plays International & Europe, drama critic Jeremy Malies noted "There is no distance whatsoever between actor and her lines in Gina Costigan’s wonderful performance. My heart leapt out to Grace as Costigan skillfully dismantled the character’s natural reticence." In 2025, she starred as Kate Mundy in Brian Friel's Dancing at Lughnasa at the Asolo Repertory Theatre directed by Joe Dowling. In 2026, she appeared as Ann Putnam in Arthur Miller's The Crucible at The Gaiety Theatre. Her recent screen work has included guest and recurring appearances in various television series, including Atlanta on FX, Harry Wild on Acorn TV, Kin on RTÉ, and Law & Order: Special Victims Unit on NBC, as well as supporting roles in the feature films My Sailor, My Love (2022) and TWIG (2024).

In addition to acting, Costigan has worked extensively as a voice artist for advertising campaigns including Guiness, Ryanair, Volkswagen, Marks & Spencer, and Electric Picnic, among others.

== Acting credits ==
=== Film ===
Year	Title	Role	Notes	Ref.
2003	Veronica Guerin	Molly		
2006	The Front Line	Garda		
2007	Becoming Jane	Caroline Austen		
2009	Swansong: Story of Occi Byrne	Nurse		
2013	A Terrible Beauty	Bridget Grace		
2013	Black Ice	Sister		
2016	The Board	Siobhann	Short film	
2017	Halal Daddy	Magda		
2018	Kryptonights	Beth		
2019	Brittany Runs a Marathon	Drunk Woman		
2020	Flesh Is Heir To	Agent Kerrigan		
2022	The Ulysses Project	Molly Bloom		
2022	My Sailor, My Love	Joyce		
2023	Suspicious Minds	Lola	Short film	
2024	TWIG	Ange's Mother		
2024	The Friend	Jocelyn		

=== Television ===
Year	Title	Role	Notes	Ref.
2007	Fair City	Diane Sutton	3 episodes	
2017	The Marvelous Mrs. Maisel	Officer Judy	2 episodes	
2019-2020	Vikings	Runa	3 episodes	
2020	I Know This Much Is True	Mrs. O'Meara	Episode: "Five"	
2021	Halston	Doctor	Episode: "Critics"	
2022	Atlanta	Karen	Episode: "White Fashion"	
2022	Harry Wild	Jenny Doyle	Episode: "A Corpse in My Soup"	
2023	Kin	Betty Duggan	Episode: "2.8"	
2024	Say Nothing	Lily	Episode: "Evil Little Maniacs"	
2024-2025	Law & Order: Special Victims Unit	Virginia Becker	2 episodes	

=== Stage ===
Year	Title	Role	Playwright	Venue	Ref.
1994	The Risen People	Street child	James Plunkett	The Gaiety Theatre	
1997	Buille an Phíce	Jenny	Brian Ó Riagáin	Andrews Lane Theatre	
2008	The Countess and the Lesbians	Countess Markievicz/Grace	Carolyn Gage	Dublin Gay Theatre Festival	
2009	An Triail	Mailí	Máiréad Ní Ghráda	Aisling Ghéar Theatre Company (National Tour)	
2009	Walnuts Remind Me of My Mother	Áine	Elizabeth Moynihan	Focus Theatre	
2009	Facebreak	Tara Costello	Gina Costigan	Dublin Gay Theatre Festival	
2010	Face to Face With the Enemy	Kristine	Judy Klass	Town Hall Theatre	
2010	Ghost Stories	Various	Isobel Mahon	Mill Theatre Dundrum	
2011	The Rainbows End	Wilhelmina	Leslie Lalor	Mill Theatre Dundrum	
2011	Billy the Boat Loves Angelina	Sandra Smith	Isobel Mahon	Liberty Hall	
2012	Billy the Boat Loves Angelina	Sandra Smith	Isobel Mahon	New Theatre, Dublin	
2012	The Muse Unbidden	Hilary	Roger Gregg	Smock Alley Theatre	
2012	Bun Go Barr	Pamela	Órna Ní Choileáin & Aodán Ó Coileáin	Aisling Ghéar Theatre Company	
2012	Les Impossibles	Actor 3	Gráinne Curistan	Edinburgh Festival Fringe	
2013	An Triail	Mailí	Máiréad Ní Ghráda	Aisling Ghéar Theatre Company (National Tour)	
2014	Daughter of the Waves	Hen	Eileen Connolly	New York Musical Theatre Festival	
2015	The Bacchae	Chorus	Euripides	Gorilla Repertory Theatre Company	
2015	The Seedbed	Hannah	Bryan Delaney	New Jersey Repertory Company	
2016	Crackskull Row	Dollie Moorigan	Honor Molloy	The Cell Theatre	
2017	Crackskull Row	Dollie Moorigan	Honor Molloy	Irish Repertory Theatre	
2017	The Suitcase Under the Bed	Jil/Mrs. Stims	Teresa Deevy	Mint Theater Company	
2018	Party Face	Mollie Mae	Isobel Mahon	New York City Center	
2018-2019	The Ferryman	Caitlin/Mary Carney (u/s)	Jez Butterworth	Bernard B. Jacobs Theatre, Broadway	
2019	The Valley Of The Squinting Windows	Brigid Byrne / Mary Essie / Mrs. McGoldrick / Miss Mckeon	Brinsley MacNamara	Mullingar Arts Centre	
2020	On McQuillan's Hill	Loretta Maline	Joe Crilly	Finborough Theatre	
2022	Hangmen	Alice/Shirley (u/s)	Martin McDonagh	John Golden Theatre, Broadway	
2022	Luaithríona	Luaithríona	Brothers Grimm & Seán Ó Muireagáin	Aisling Ghéar Theatre Company	
2023	Faith Healer	Grace Hardy	Brian Friel	London Classic Theatre (National Tour)	
2025	Dancing At Lughnasa	Kate Mundy	Brian Friel	Asolo Repertory Theatre	
2026	The Crucible	Ann Putnam	Arthur Miller	The Gaiety Theatre	

=== Radio ===
Year	Title	Role	Author	Broadcaster	Ref.
2021	The Long Wet Grass	Woman	Seamus Scanlon	The Cell Theatre	
2021	Paddy Goes to Petra	Air Hostess	Aine Ryan	Near FM	
2021	Black Cherry	Leonie	Krystal Sweedman	Near FM	

== Awards and nominations ==
Year	Associations	Category	Work	Result	Ref.
2018	1st Irish Awards	Best Actress	Party Face	Nominated	
2019	The Irish Echo	40 Under 40	The Ferryman	Honored	
