= Party Face =

2018 play by dramatist Isobel Mahon

- Promotional poster
- Written by: Isobel Mahon
- Original language: English
- Subject: Mental health, Family, Celtic Tiger
- Genre: Comedy
- Setting: Dublin, Ireland

Premiere
- Date premiered: 2 November 2017
- Place premiered: Town Hall Theatre (Ireland); New York City Center (United States)
- partyfaceplay.com

Party Face (also known as Boom?) is a play by Isobel Mahon. Originally premiering at the Town Hall Theatre in Galway, on 2 November, 2017. Directed by Caroline FitzGerald, the cast featured Maria McDermottroe, Isobel Mahon, Karen Egan, Claudia Carroll, and Rosemary Henderson. The production subsequently transferred to The Gaiety Theatre in Dublin on 26 March, 2018.

Party Face made its U.S. premiere at New York City Center on 11 January, 2018, running Off-Broadway through 8 April, 2018. Directed by Amanda Bearse, the cast featured Academy Award-winner Hayley Mills, Gina Costigan, Brenda Meaney, Allison Jean White, and Klea Blackhurst. The play won Best Production at the 2018 1st Irish Awards.

Set in Dublin, Party Face depicts a woman named Mollie Mae as she hosts a party in her newly renovated kitchen. However, what starts as a friendly gathering quickly spirals into chaos as deep-seated issues, secrets, and personal struggles come to the surface.

== Cast and characters ==
Characters	Town Hall Theatre (2017)	New York City Center (2018)	Gaiety Theatre (2018)
Mollie Mae	Isobel Mahon	Gina Costigan	Isobel Mahon
Carmel	Maria McDermottroe	Hayley Mills	Maria McDermottroe
Maeve	Karen Egan	Brenda Meaney	Karen Egan
Chloe	Claudia Carroll	Allison Jean White	Claudia Carroll
Bernie	Rosemary Henderson	Klea Blackhurst	Rosemary Henderson

Mollie Mae
The host of the party and the central character. She is wife and mother, whose husband is an architect and who lives in a beautiful home. She has recently been discharged from a mental health facility and is attempting to present a perfect front, despite inner turmoil.
Carmel
Mollie Mae’s overbearing and perfectionist mother. She is obsessed with appearances and maintaining a bourgeois image of family and success.
Maeve
Mollie Mae’s confident and straight-talking sister, who harbors unexpressed insecurities of her own.
Chloe
Mollie Mae’s posh friend and neighbor who serves as an outsider perspective, sometimes providing comic relief but also blunt honesty.
Bernie
A friend of Carmel's that possesses a more alternative and free-spirited approach to life, contrasting with the other characters.

== Plot ==
The play follows Mollie Mae, a woman who has recently been discharged from a mental health facility. She hosts a party in her newly renovated kitchen, hoping for a fun and lighthearted evening. However, as the guests arrive—including her perfectionist mother, her anxious sister, and an unexpected outsider—the event quickly descends into chaos. As the night progresses, secrets are revealed, tensions flare, and the characters’ carefully constructed facades begin to crack. Beneath the witty banter and comedic exchanges, Party Face delves into serious themes such as depression, self-worth, and the unrealistic expectations society places on women. The play balances humor with heartfelt moments, ultimately delivering a message about authenticity, self-acceptance, and the importance of support systems in overcoming personal struggles.

== Production history ==
=== Town Hall Theatre, Galway ===
The play premiered under the title Boom? at the Town Hall Theatre in Galway on November 2, 2017. The production was produced by Jan Warner Productions and directed by Caroline FitzGerald. The original cast included Isobel Mahon as Mollie Mae, Maria McDermottroe as Carmel, Karen Egan as Maeve, Claudia Carroll as Chloe, and Rosemary Henderson as Bernie.

=== The Gaiety Theatre, Dublin ===
The original Town Hall Theatre production later transferred to The Gaiety Theatre in Dublin, under the title joint Boom? or Party Face. The production had a sold-out run from March 26–31, featuring the original cast.

=== New York City Center, Off-Broadway ===
The play debuted Off-Broadway at New York City Center Stage II the following year, under the title Party Face. The production was directed by Amanda Bearse, and ran from January 11 to April 8, 2018. The cast included Gina Costigan as Mollie Mae, Academy Award-winner Hayley Mills as Carmel, Brenda Meaney as Maeve, Allison Jean White as Chloe, and Klea Blackhurst as Bernie. The design team included Jeff Ridenour (scenic), Lara Dawn de Bruijn (costumes), Joyce Liao (lighting), and Damien Figueras (sound). Producers included Robert Driemeyer, Morgan Sills and Jane Warner. The production competed as part of Origin Theatre's 1st Irish Festival, winning awards for Best Production and Best Actress, for Mills.

== Reception ==
The play received mixed reviews from critics and audiences in both Ireland and the United States. The Off-Broadway production currently holds a score of 73% on the review aggregator Show-Score, based on 220 reviews. Tim Teeman of The Daily Beast wrote

"Slight but charming. The play errs on the side of mild rather than biting; it feels a gentle, rather than searing, deconstruction of a family crisis... Costigan’s excellent performance is the layered heart of the play... Meaney is also great as the protective Maeve... By the end, everyone’s 'party faces' turn out to be the most unnecessary masks, and that missing chunk of kitchen, expensive as it was, begins to look like the best kind of design trend."

In a more negative review, Alexis Soloksi of The New York Times observed "An unlikely comedy...What's strange about the play, which is written in a realistic style, is how implausible it all seems... Each character is made to move and speak in ways that contradict even a passing knowledge of human behavior and reap only sporadic laughs... There are glimmers of a state-of-the-nation play here, in which shiny surfaces mask the dissatisfaction underneath... The actresses appear to be enjoying themselves. At least someone is having a good time."

Similarly, David Gordon of TheaterMania wrote "Despite taking place in present-day Dublin, Party Face feels out of touch with contemporary sensibilities and seems to be on the wrong side the ongoing conversation about women's rights. Mahon traffics in stereotypes... That Bearse has directed television is very apparent throughout. The character work is broad and unnatural, and perhaps a director with more stage experience could have coaxed performances that were more multifaceted out of this company."

== Awards ==
Year	Association	Category	Recipient	Result	Ref.
2018	1st Irish Awards	Best production	New York City Center	Won	
2018	1st Irish Awards	Best Director	Amanda Bearse	Nominated	
2018	1st Irish Awards	Best Actress	Hayley Mills	Won	
2018	1st Irish Awards	Best Actress	Gina Costigan	Nominated	
2018	1st Irish Awards	Best Design	Jeff Ridenour, Lara Dawn de Bruijn, Joyce Liao, & Damien Figueras	Nominated	
