= Maria McDermottroe =

Irish actress (born 1952)

- Born: 1952 or 1953 (age 73–74); Sligo, Ireland
- Education: Abbey Theatre School
- Occupation: Actress
- Years active: 1971–present
- Known for: Killinaskully (2004-2009); Glenroe (1995-2000); Angela's Ashes (1999); The Dead (1987); Equus (1978)
- Spouse: John Costigan
- Children: Gina Costigan

Maria McDermottroe (Irish: Máire Nic Dhiarmata Ruadh; born 1952 or 1953) is an Irish actress, known for her work across screen and stage. She portrayed Molly Ivors in John Huston's 1987 film The Dead, based on the James Joyce novella of the same name, and Bridey Hannon in Alan Parker's 1999 film Angela's Ashes, based on Frank McCourt's best-selling memoir of the same name. Her other film credits include The Boxer, Trojan Eddie, Bogwoman, Saltwater, Veronica Guerin, The Blackwater Lightship, and The Winter Lake.

On television, McDermottroe is best known for playing Venetia Crosby on the long-running RTÉ drama serial Glenroe (1995-2000), and Mrs. Gilhooley on the RTÉ comedy series Killinaskully (2004-2009), for which she was nominated for the Golden Nymph Award for Best Actress at the 2009 Monte-Carlo Television Festival. Her numerous guest appearances include roles on ScreenPlay, Family, The Governor, Proof, Foreign Exchange, Mattie, Taken Down, Smother, and Nova Jones.

A veteran of the theatre, McDermottroe has appeared in over 50 professional stage productions, including 16 productions with the National Theatre of Ireland. Her stage career began with Hilton Edwards and Micheál Mac Liammóir at the Gate Theatre in the 1970s. It was there that she became the first Irish woman to appear nude on stage for her portrayal of Jill Mason in the Irish premiere of Equus by Peter Shaffer.

== Life and career ==
McDermottroe was born in Sligo town in the 1950s, one of four children (including writer/director Conor) of Eddie and Nora McDermottroe. Her first theatre role was in a production of The Merchant of Venice featuring Micheál Mac Liammóir and Hilton Edwards. She married John Costigan, future Executive Director of Dublin's Gaiety Theatre, in 1979, having first met in 1977. They have two children including writer Nora Costigan and actress Gina Costigan. They live in Dún Laoghaire.

Her character in Glenroe was introduced in 1995, as Venetia, the matriarch of the Crosby family. Venetia later divorced and married divorcé Dick Moran. In Pat Shortt's rural sitcom, Killinaskully, McDermottroe portrayed Mrs. Gilhooley, known for repeatedly not being "in the habit of repeating" herself, She played crime figure John Gilligan's wife in 2003's Veronica Guerin, a film in which her daughter Gina Costigan portrayed the wife of criminal figure John Traynor. In 2010, McDermottroe's performance in an Eska Riada production of Frank McGuinness's one-woman play Baglady in the Focus Theatre, was described by Jesse Weaver of Irish Theatre Magazine as a "measured, taught, and ultimately arresting ... portrait of an identity nearly dissolving itself".

In 2017, she played Carmel in Isobel Mahon's Boom?. Her film credits include John Huston's The Dead, John Erman's The Blackwater Lightship, and The Winter Lake. She was named "Best Actress", at the 2023 Milan Gold March Awards, for her role in The Carer.

== Filmography ==
=== Film ===
Year	Title	Role	Notes	Ref.
1979	Silver Apples of the Moon	Moira	RTÉ TV Movie	
1987	The Dead	Molly Ivors		
1990	Dear Sarah	Mrs. Moore		
1991	Crossed Lines	Katie	Short film	
1994	Widows' Peak	Penitent		
1996	Trojan Eddie	Rosy		
1997	Bogwoman	Annie		
1997	The Boxer	Betty		
1998	This Is My Father	Mrs. Maney		
1999	Angela's Ashes	Birdie Hannon		
2000	Saltwater	Headmistress		
2001	The Bombmaker	Miss O'Mara		
2001	Give Up Yer Aul Sins	Peig Cunningham	Animated short	
2003	Veronica Guerin	Geraldine Gilligan		
2004	The Blackwater Lightship	Madge Kehoe		
2005	Bumble's Burden	Ma	Short film	
2006	Secret of the Cave	Mrs. MacIntyre		
2008	Situations Vacant	Mother		
2009	Swansong: Story of Occi Byrne	Sister Benedict		
2016	In View	Monica		
2017	Halal Daddy	Lorraine		
2019	Saving Grace	Grace	Short film	
2020	The Winter Lake	Tessie		
2020	Post Love	Cathy	Short film	
2022	Haven	Carmel	Short film	
2023	The Martini Shot	Ethel		
2024	The Carer	Moira McNamara	Short film	

=== Television ===
Year	Title	Role	Notes	Ref.
1985	Fortycoats & Co.	The Lilter	Episode: “Fortycoats and the Monster Mystery”	
1989–1990	ScreenPlay	Angela	2 episodes	
1994	Family	Niamh	Episode: "Charlo"	
1995	The Governor	June Fisher	2 episodes	
1995–2000	Glenroe	Venetia	Main role	
2002	Give Up Yer Aul Sins	Peig Cunningham	Main role	
2004	Proof	Mrs. Erskine	Episode: "#1.2"	
2004	Foreign Exchange	Mrs. Murphy	Episode: "Hostel"	
2004–2008	Killinaskully	Mrs. Gilhooley	Main role	
2011	Mattie	Mary Elizabeth Carr	2 episodes	
2018	Taken Down	Irene	2 episodes	
2022	Smother	Imelda	3 episodes	
2022–2023	Nova Jones	Granny Nova	2 episodes	
2023	Drama on Newstalk	Maria	Episode: "Changing Coasts"	

=== Theatre ===
Year	Title	Role	Playwright	Venue	Ref.
1971	Hall of Healing	Patient	Sean O'Casey	Abbey Theatre	
1971	The Shadow of a Gunman	Mrs. Henderson	Sean O'Casey	Abbey Theatre	
1977	The Devil's Disciple	Essie	George Bernard Shaw	Gate Theatre	
1977	The Merchant of Venice	Jessica	William Shakespeare	Gate Theatre	
1977	Equus	Jill Mason	Peter Shaffer	Gate Theatre	
1977	Major Barbara	Jenny Hill	George Bernard Shaw	Gate Theatre	
1978	Equus	Jill Mason	Peter Shaffer	Gate Theatre	
1978	Bedroom Farce	Kate	Alan Ayckbourn	Gate Theatre	
1978	Proxopera	Ensemble	Benedict Kiely & Peter Luke	Gate Theatre	
1979	Crooked in the Car Seat	Irene Murphy	Brian Lynch	Dublin Theatre Festival	
1980	Cop-Out	Nell	David Hayes	Dublin Theatre Festival	
1980	Zoz	Mrs. Connie Curran/Girl	Joe O'Donnell	Dublin Theatre Festival	
1980	The Chastitute	Heather/Trudy/Julia	John B. Keane	Cork Opera House	
1981	Kill	Therese Fitzackerly	Hugh Leonard	Dublin Theatre Festival	
1984	Hedda Gabler	Thea Elvstead	Henrik Ibsen	Gate Theatre	
1988	St. Stephen's Green: Or, The Generous Lovers	Marina	William Philips	Abbey Theatre	
1988	Carthaginians	Sarah	Frank McGuiness	Abbey Theatre	
1991	The Threepenny Opera	Vixen	Frank McGuiness / Bertolt Brecht	Gate Theatre	
1992	Carthaginians	Maela	Frank McGuinness	Druid Theatre Company	
1992	Dancing at Lughnasa	Kate	Brian Friel	Abbey Theatre	
1993	Dancing at Lughnasa	Kate	Brian Friel	Abbey Theatre (International Tour)	
1993	Dancing at Lughnasa	Kate	Brian Friel	Abbey Theatre (National Tour)	
1994	The Bird Sanctuary	Tina	Frank McGuiness	Abbey Theatre	
1994	The Broken Jug	Martha Reck	Heinrich von Kleist / John Banville	Abbey Theatre	
1994	Seachange	Woman	John Banville	Project Arts Centre	
1994	The Risen People	Mrs. Hennessey	James Plunkett	Gaiety Theatre	
1995	Philadelphia, Here I Come!	Lizzy Sweeney	Brian Friel	Abbey Theatre	
1996	The Invisible Mending Company	Cissy	Philip Davison	Abbey Theatre	
1999	Moll	Moll	John B. Keane	Gaiety Theatre	
1999	Kevin's Bed	Pauline	Bernard Farrell	Abbey Theatre	
2002	For the Pleasure of Seeing Her Again	Nana	Michel Tremblay	Abbey Theatre	
2003	The Late Henry Moss	Conchalla	Sam Shepard	Abbey Theatre	
2004	Portia Coughlan	Marianne Scully	Marina Carr	Abbey Theatre	
2006	True West	Mother	Sam Shepard	Abbey Theatre	
2010	Boss Grady's Boys	Mrs. Molloy	Sebastian Barry	Gaiety Theatre	
2011	The Glass Menagerie	Amanda Wingfield	Tennessee Williams	Town Hall Theatre	
2011	Baglady	Baglady	Frank McGuiness	Focus Theatre	
2012	Payback!	Kitty	Maria McDermottroe / Marion O'Dwyer	Fishamble: The New Play Company	
2014	A Skull in Connemara	Maryjohnny Rafferty	Martin McDonagh	Gaiety Theatre	
2015	The Field	Mrs. McCabe	John B. Keane	Gaiety Theatre	
2017	The Chastitute	Aunt Jane	John B. Keane	Gaiety Theatre	
2017	Boom	Carmel	Isobel Mahon	Dunamaise Arts Centre	
2017	Boom	Carmel	Isobel Mahon	Gaiety Theatre	
2018	A Skull in Connemara	Maryjohnny Rafferty	Martin McDonagh	Town Hall Theatre	
2018	A Skull in Connemara	Maryjohnny Rafferty	Martin McDonagh	Olympia Theatre	
2019	The Valley of the Squinting Windows	Marse Prendergast	Brinsley MacNamara / Michael Scott	Mullingar Arts Centre	

== Awards ==
Year	Association	Category	Work	Result	Ref.
2009	Golden Nymph Awards	Best Actress	Killinaskully	Nominated	
2022	Dublin International Film Festival	Best Female Actor	Post Love	Nominated	
2023	Toronto International Women's Film Festival	Best Actress	Haven	Won	
2024	Northeast Film Festival	Best Ensemble	The Martini Shot	Won	
2024	Beaufort International Film Festival	Best Ensemble	The Martini Shot	Won	
2024	Cobb International Film Festival	Best Ensemble	The Martini Shot	Won	
2024	Milan Gold Awards	Best Actress (March)	The Carer	Won	
