= Crilly =

Crilly may refer to:

== Organisations ==
- Crilly Airways, British former airline

== People ==
- Anna Crilly (born 1975), English actress and comedian
- Chris Crilly, Canadian musician and composer
- Daniel Crilly (1857–1923), Irish Member of Parliament and author
- Joe Crilly (1962–2017), Irish playwright
- Mark Crilly (born 1980), Scottish footballer and football manager
- Michael Crilly (born 1983), English amateur footballer and motocross rider
- Rob Crilly (born 1973), British-Irish journalist
- Sarah Crilly (born 1991), Scottish footballer
- Tommy Crilly (1895–1960), English footballer

== Fictional characters ==
- Father Ted Crilly, the title character of the TV situation comedy Father Ted

== Places ==
- Crilly Hill, hill in the Queen Maud Mountains, Antarctica

== See also ==
- Crilley, a surname
