= A Terrible Beauty (2013 film) =

- Theatrical release poster
- Directed by: Keith Farrell
- Written by: Keith Farrell
- Produced by: Dave Farrell; Stephen Rooke
- Starring: Hugh O'Conor; Owen McDonnell; Rick Burn; Karen Ardiff; Megan Cassidy; Gina Costigan
- Cinematography: Colm Whelan
- Edited by: Daithi Connaughton
- Music by: Steve Lynch
- Production company: Tile Films Ltd.
- Distributed by: TG4; Screen Ireland
- Release date: 16 February 2013 (Ireland)
- Running time: 97 minutes
- Country: Ireland
- Language: Irish

A Terrible Beauty (also known as Áille an Uafáis) is a 2013 Irish language docudrama, written and directed by Keith Farrell. The film chronicles the men and women of the 1916 Easter Rising and subsequent Irish War of Independence. The film premiered in competition at the Dublin International Film Festival, and was subsequently distributed by TG4. The cast includes Hugh O'Conor, Owen McDonnell, Rick Burn, Karen Ardiff, Megan Cassidy, and Gina Costigan.

The film was nominated for three Irish Film and Television Awards, including Best Irish Language Programme, Director of Photography, and Best Specialist Factual Programme.

== Plot ==
A Terrible Beauty is the story of the Easter Rising in Dublin in 1916, leading to the massacre of 15 young men and boys following the shoot-out at Mount Street Bridge. The film explores the story of the British soldiers who thought they were being sent to France to fight in the Great War, and were surprised to find themselves in Dublin. It also tells the story of the Irish volunteers and the citizens of Dublin, who became caught up in the fighting.

== Cast ==
- Hugh O'Conor as Lt. Arthur Dickson
- Owen McDonnell as Ned Daly
- Rick Burn as Jack Shouldice
- Karen Ardiff as Sarah Hughes
- Megan Cassidy as May Cullen
- Gina Costigan as Bridget Grace

== Reception ==
The film received mostly positive reviews. Steve Martin of The Irish Post commended the film for its vivid recreation of the "claustrophobic chaos of gun battle," drawing parallels to classics like The Wild Bunch and The Battle of Algiers. However, he noted that the film offers limited insight into the complexities of the rebel fighters and omits mention of groups like the Irish Citizen Army.

Film Ireland Magazine highlighted the film's focus on the personal stories of ordinary soldiers from both sides, describing it as a "surprisingly tender and tragic portrayal" that effectively uses first-hand accounts to present authentic voices from the conflict.

Rick Cogan of the Chicago Tribune gave the film 3.5/4 stars, writing "It is about bullets flying and bodies falling, but it will capture you on a deeply personal level." Conversely, Drew Hunt of the Chicago Reader observed, "The balance of the film trades in more traditional documentary tropes -- archival footage, commentary from actual historians -- which contribute to its severe identity crisis."

== Awards ==
| Year | Association | Category | Nominee | Result | Ref. |
|---|---|---|---|---|---|
| 2013 | Dublin International Film Festival | Best Irish Feature Film | Keith Farrell | Nominated | |
| 2013 | Celtic Media Festival | Best Feature | Keith Farrell | Nominated | |
| 2015 | Irish Film & Television Academy | Best Irish Language Programme | Keith Farrell | Nominated | |
| 2015 | Irish Film & Television Academy | Director of Photography | Colm Whelan | Won | |
| 2015 | Irish Film & Television Academy | Best Specialist Factual Programme | Keith Farrell | Nominated | |
