= Stuart Graham (actor) =

Northern Irish actor (born 1967)

- Born: 31 August 1967 (age 59); Belfast, Northern Ireland, UK
- Education: University of Ulster
- Occupation: Actor
- Years active: 1990–present
- Children: 2

Stuart Graham (born 31 August 1967) is a film, television, and stage actor, born and brought up in Northern Ireland.

== Life ==
Born in Belfast and educated at the University of Ulster, where he took a degree in media studies, Graham trained for an acting career at a drama school in London. In 1990 he played a minor part in a revival of Berenice at the Cottesloe Theatre, Lambeth, and in 1991 appeared at the Dublin Theatre Festival in a production of Michael Collins Big Fella! by the Praxis Theatre Laboratory of Greenwich, playing the part of Eoin O'Duffy.

Most of Graham's stage work has been in Dublin and Belfast, while in film and television he has worked in both Irish and British productions, specialising in playing Irishmen. However, his leading roles have included the part of the Englishman Howard Carter in Egypt (2005).

In 2000, Graham directed the premiere of Gary Mitchell's play, Marching On, at the Lyric Theatre, Belfast.

In an interview in 2011, Graham commented

...if you are simply a jobbing actor, in order to have any sort of longevity in the industry, you have to hand over control of your life.

In April 2017, he appeared in The Ferryman at the Royal Court Theatre, ahead of a transfer to the Gielgud Theatre in the West End.

== Filmography ==
=== Film ===
Year	Title	Role	Notes
1992	The Bargain Shop	Packy	
1996	Michael Collins	Thomas Cullen	
1997	The Butcher Boy	Priest at College	
1997	The Informant	Det. Astley	
1999	One Man's Hero	Corporal Kenneally	
1999	Misery Harbour	John Wakefield	
2003	Song for a Raggy Boy	Brother Whelan	
2003	Goldfish Memory	Larry	
2006	Small Engine Repair	Burley	
2008	Hunger	Raymond Lohan	
2010	The Whistleblower	McVeigh	
2010	Parked	George O'Regan	
2011	Christopher and His Kind	Passport Officer	
2011	Hideaways	Sergeant	
2011	Tinker Tailor Soldier Spy	Minister	
2012	Grabbers	Skipper	
2012	Shadow Dancer	Ian Gilmore	
2012	Jump	Doctor	
2012	Milo	Brand Mulder	
2013	Made in Belfast	Driver	
2013	A Belfast Story	Crony	
2015	The Hallow	Contractor Paul Williams	
2015	A Patch of Fog	Tom Breslin	
2016	In View	Donny	
2017	Mary Shelley	Publisher	
2017	The Foreigner	Detective Inspector Donald Greig	
2017	Bad Day for the Cut	Trevor Ballantine	
2017	The Cured	Cantor	
2021	Wolf	Jacob's Father	
2022	Aisha	Francis Manning	
2025	The Occupant	Archie	

=== Television ===
Year	Title	Role	Notes
1993	ScreenPlay	Alex Mallie	Episode: "Love Lies Bleeding/L'Inconnue de Belfast"
1995	The Governor	Stephen / Steven Wolton	2 episodes
2000	In Defence	DI Paul Howard	Episode #1.1
2000	The Sins	Gavin Blackwell	Episode: "Anger"
2001	Shockers	Carl Gatliss	Episode: "Cyclops"
2002	Sunday	RUC Interrogator #2	Television film
2002	As the Beast Sleeps	Kyle	Television film
2002	Outside the Rules	Derek Bloor	TV series
2002	Silent Witness	DS Tony Ashton	2 episodes
2003	The Commander	Phil Vos	Television film
2003	Waking the Dead	Fin Dawley	2 episodes
2004	Proof	Andrew O'Hara	4 episodes
2004	Pulling Moves	JJ Diamond	2 episodes
2004	Omagh	Victor Barker	Television film
2004	Steel River Blues	Bill McGlinchy	6 episodes
2005	The Commander: Blackdog	Sergeant Phil Vos	Television film
2005	Egypt	Howard Carter	2 episodes
2005	The Clinic	Dr. Richard McKenna	9 episodes
2007	Waterloo Road	Russell Millen	Episode #2.7
2007	Rough Diamond	Rory Dillane	Episode #1.6
2007	Single-Handed	Johnny Mallon	3 episodes
2007	The Bill	Sgt. Billy McAndrew	Episode: "Line of Fire: Part 2"
2008	10 Days to War	Beattie	Episode: "Our Business is North"
2009	Occupation	Vicar	Episode #1.3
2009	Scapegoat	Dr. Rossiter Lewis	Television film
2010	Jack Taylor	Tim Caffrey	Episode: "The Pikemen"
2011	Christopher and His Kind	Passport Officer	Television film
2011	Brendan Smyth: Betrayal of Trust	Detective	Television film
2011	Hidden	Barry Fissell	Episode #1.3
2012	Save Our Souls: The Titanic Inquiry	Captain Lord	Television film
2013	Scúp	Nick	Episode: "Tribute"
2013	The Great Train Robbery	The Ulsterman	Episode: "A Robber's Tale"
2013–2016	The Fall	DCI Matthew Eastwood	13 episodes
2014	Our World War	Father Brookes	Episode: "Pals"
2015	6Degrees	Mr. Morrow	3 episodes
2015	The Frankenstein Chronicles	Forrester	5 episodes
2016	Thirteen	Angus Moxam	5 episodes
2016	The Secret	Dave Stewart	2 episodes
2017	Vera	Alan Marston	Episode: "Broken Promise"
2017	The Last Post	Ronnie Carter	2 episodes
2018	The Interrogation of Tony Martin	DS Newton	Television film
2020, 2022	Professionals	Dr. Abraham Geller	3 episodes
2021–2022	Smother	Denis Ahern	8 episodes
2021, 2023	The Wheel of Time	Geofram Bornhald	2 episodes
2022	Harry Wild	Ray Tiernan	8 episodes
2022	The Window	Billy Burdett	2 episodes
2022	North Sea Connection	Quinn	6 episodes
2023	Dalgliesh	DI Doyle	2 episodes

== Stage ==
- Berenice (1990) at the Cottesloe Theatre, Lambeth (a Royal National Theatre production)
- Michael Collins Big Fella! (1991) at the St George's Theatre, Dublin (Praxis Theatre Laboratory of Greenwich, at Dublin Theatre Festival, 1991)
- The Silver Tassie (1994) at the Almeida Theatre, London
- Alternative Future (1994) at the Old Museum Arts Centre, Belfast
- In a Little World of Our Own (1997) at the Abbey Theatre, Dublin
- As the Beast Sleeps (1997) at the Abbey Theatre, Dublin
- Carthaginians (1999) at the Lyric Theatre, Belfast
- Force of Change (2000) at the Royal Court Theatre, Kensington
- A Number (2007) at the Peacock Theatre, Dublin
- Pump Girl (2008) at the Queen's Drama Studio, Belfast
- The Painkiller (2011) at the Lyric Theatre, Belfast
- The Ferryman (2017) at the Royal Court Theatre and Gielgud Theatre, London
