= Shane Quigley Murphy =

Irish actor from Dublin

- Born: Ballinteer, Dublin, Ireland
- Occupation: Actor
- Television: Fair City

Shane Quigley Murphy is an Irish actor from Ballinteer, Dublin. He is best known for his role as Gareth Boyle in the Irish soap opera, Fair City, for which he has starred in since 2022.

== Career ==
=== Television ===
Quigley Murphy has appeared in several television series. In 2017, he appeared as 'Patrick' in the drama series, Outlander. In 2021, he appeared as 'Thespin Pilot Obsidian' in the Apple TV+ series, Foundation. Later that year he played ‘Dean Fearon’ in the first season of the RTÉ television crime drama series Kin. In 2022, he starred as Aelfrun in the Netflix series, Vikings: Valhalla. In late 2022, Quigley Murphy joined the cast of, Fair City, playing the character, Gareth Boyle. Since his first appearance he has featured in some of the programme's most talked-about storylines.

=== Film ===
Quigley Murphy played a leading role in Kill Your Lover directed by Alix Austin and Keir Siewert which premiered at the Brooklyn Horror Film Festival on October 12, 2023.

=== Theatre ===
In 2016, Quigley Murphy had a role in Circle of Fifths directed by Matt Lenton at the Royal Conservatoire of Scotland. In December 2018, he played the role of Little John in the Mill Theatre Dundrum production of Robin Hood. In May 2019, Quigley Murphy starred as Lennox & Starveling/Fairy/Moth in Shakespeare's Rose Theatre's production of Macbeth and A Midsummer Night's Dream. Later that year he starred as 'The Beast' in the Mill Theatre Dundrum production of Beauty and the Beast.

=== Video games ===
In 2020, Quigley Murphy voiced the main playable character in the Ubisoft’s video game Watch Dogs: Legion directed by Clint Hocking and Kent Hudson.

== Other work ==
=== Dancing with the Stars ===
On 4 December 2023, Quigley Murphy was announced as one of the celebrities taking part in the seventh season of the Irish version of Dancing with the Stars.

== Filmography ==
Year	Film/Television	Role	Notes
2011	The Modern Man Makes a Sandwich	Thieving Gorging Fool	Short film
2015	Jesse Functions	Tommy	
2016	Immortalised	Stephen Cassidy	
2016	True Value	Russell	Short film
2017	Outlander	Patrick	
2021	Foundation	Thespin Pilot Obsidian	
2021	Kin	Dean Fearon	
2022	Vikings: Valhalla	Aelfrun	
2022–	Fair City	Gareth Boyle	
2023	Kill Your Lover	Axel	
