= Ballinteer =

Southern suburb of Dublin, Ireland

Ballinteer Baile an tSaoir
- Suburb
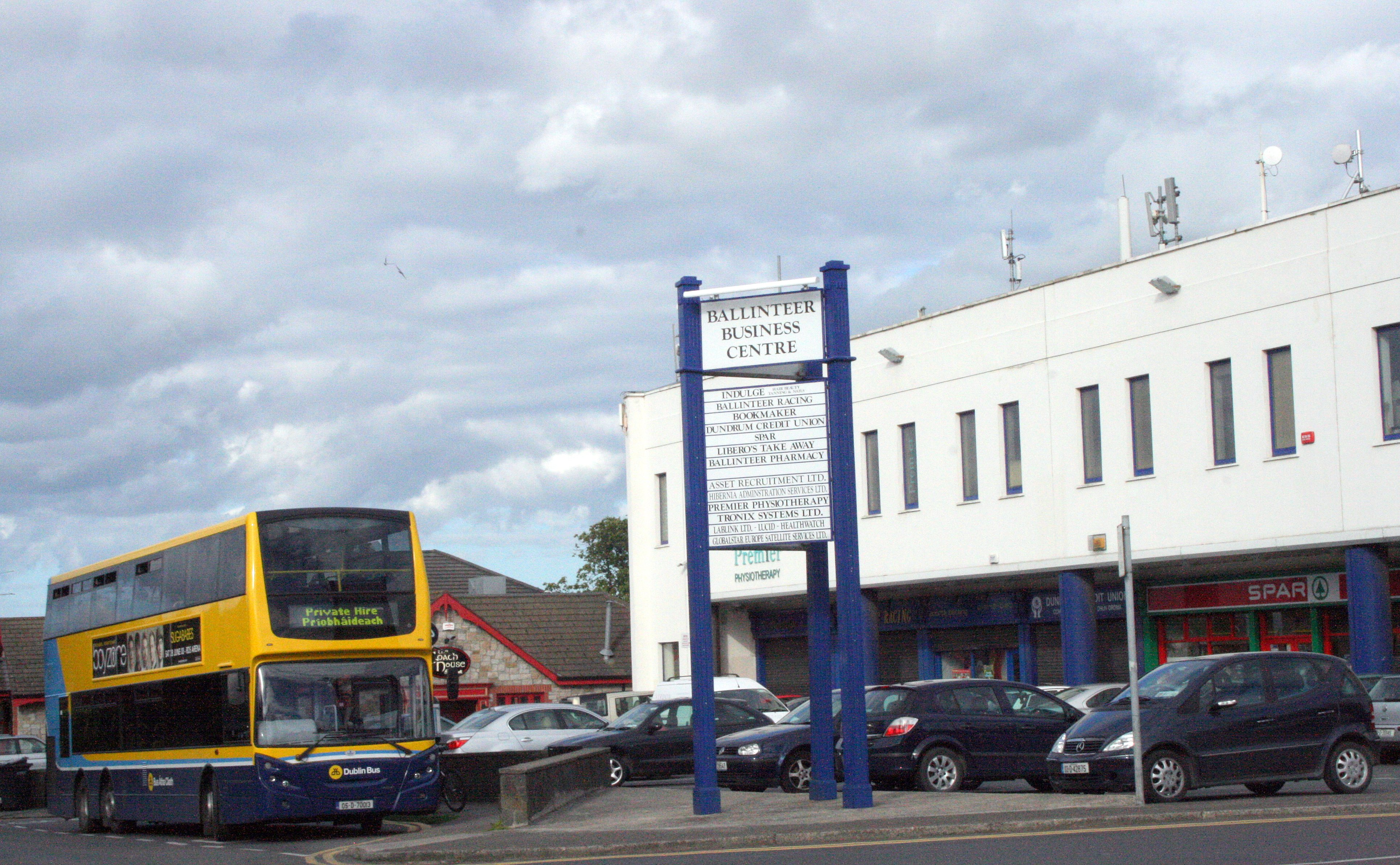
- Ballinteer Avenue, Coach House pub area

- Location in Dublin Ballinteer (Ireland)
- Coordinates: 53°17′N 6°16′W
- Country: Ireland
- Province: Leinster
- County: County Dublin
- Local government area: Dún Laoghaire–Rathdown

Population (2022)
  - Electoral divisions: 15,659
- Time zone: UTC±0 (WET)
  - Summer (DST): UTC+1 (IST)
- Eircode routing key: D16
- Telephone area code: +353(0)1

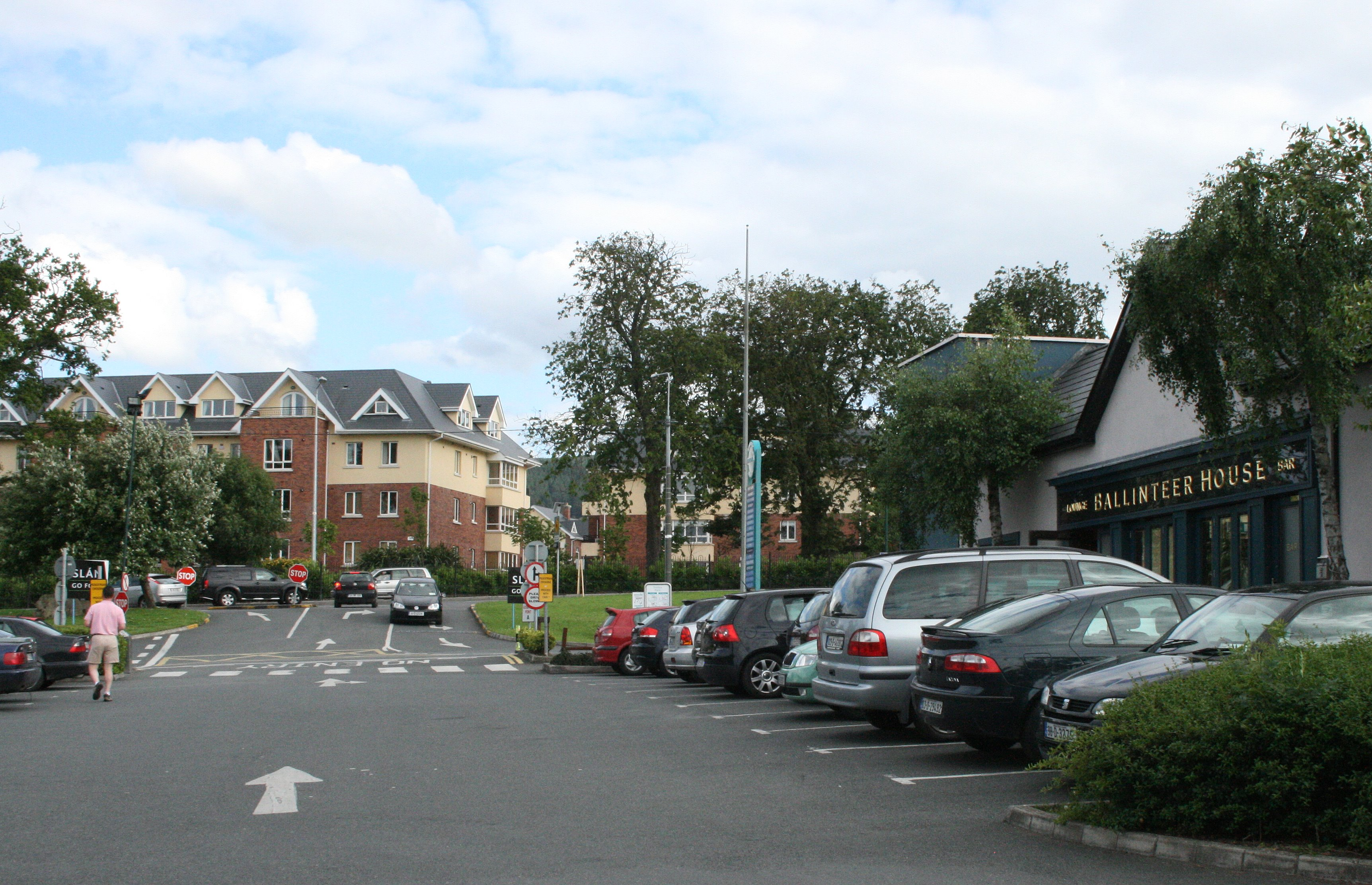
Off Ballinteer Avenue in the Ballinteer Neighborhood Centre

Ballinteer (Irish: Baile an tSaoir, meaning 'Town of the Stonemason') is a small southside suburb of Dublin, located in Dún Laoghaire–Rathdown, within the traditional County Dublin in Ireland. It was extensively developed from the late 1960s onwards. The population of all electoral divisions labelled as Ballinteer was 15,659 as of the 2022 census.

== Geography ==
Ballinteer is located approximately 10 km (6 mi) from the city centre. To the west is Rathfarnham, to the east is Sandyford and Stepaside, to the south are the Dublin Mountains, and to the north is Dundrum. Ballinteer also borders 120 hectares (300 acres) Marlay Park.

== History ==
Ballinteer originally consisted of some housing roads off Ballinteer Avenue (Mayfield Terrace, Ballinteer Gardens, and Ballinteer Park), built between the 1920s and 1950s, and locally referred to as Old Ballinteer. Ludford Estate, off Ballinteer Road, was built in the late 1960s, followed by Ballinteer Drive, Grove, Crescent, Close. The latter four roads were originally called Lissadel Estate when built in the late 1960s and early 1970s. Woodpark estate was built along the Southern side of Ballinteer Avenue which included a new shopping area with a public house. The sprawling estate of Broadford was built between the mid-1970s and early 1980s along with the ex-council estate Hillview. The most recent estate, Ballintyre, built adjacent to Woodpark upper end, all the way to the end of Ballinteer Avenue, began construction in 2005 and was finished in mid-2008. Ballinteer Avenue also retains a large Catholic Church, large supermarket with second public house and boys and girls primary schools (Our Lady's Girls National School & Our Lady's Boys National School).

== Amenities ==
Ballinteer has a range of shops and businesses including a mid-size supermarket located along Ballinteer Avenue. Also located here is a post office, a real estate and two public houses. Every New Year's Day, the two public houses play a game of soccer in nearby Marlay Park. Marlay Park is a large open parkland, with a craft centre near the old "big house"; the park hosts major concerts every year. Aside from St. Enda's, Dodder Park and Bushy Park (see above) and small green spaces, the area also hosts two golf clubs.

== Transport ==
Dublin Bus routes 14, 14c, 16, 16c, 16d, 116, S6, and S8 all serve Ballinteer.

However recently, at the end of November 2023, the 175 and 75/75a buses were taken off service, causing huge issues for the public, including students who previously availed those buses to directly go to UCD and Dun Laoghaire colleges.

== Education ==
Primary schools in the area include St. Attracta's Junior National School, St. Attracta's Senior National School, Our Lady's Boys' National School, Our Lady's Girls' National School, Scoil Naithí, and Ballinteer Educate Together National School.

Secondary schools serving Ballinteer include Ballinteer Community School and Wesley College.

== Sports ==
Ballinteer St. Johns is the local GAA club.

Broadford Rovers soccer club, established in 1978, is based at Stonemason's Way. Its facilities include two dressing rooms and two AstroTurf football pitches. The senior teams and seven-a-side teams play at Broadford Park on Saturdays and Sundays. The middle teams (under elevens to under eighteens) play at nearby Marlay Park. Broadford has produced players like Glen Fitzpatrick (Saint Patrick's Athletic), Richard Sadlier who played for Millwall, and Ian Daly who plays for Irish Premier Division Side St Patrick's Athletic F.C.

== People ==
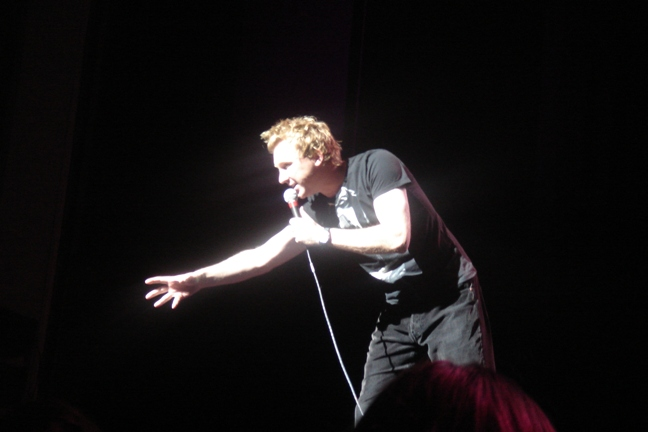
Comedian Jason Byrne, who is from Ballinteer

- Jason Byrne, comedian
- Derek Daly, former racing driver
- David Gillick, 400m Irish record holder
- Coman Goggins, Dublin inter-county Gaelic footballer
- Jimmy Gopperth, rugby player
- David Kitt, an Irish musician
- Tom Kitt, Fianna Fáil TD and former Government Chief Whip
- David Malone, Paralympian, gold medal swimmer
- Danny O'Donoghue, lead singer of The Script
- Shane Quigley Murphy, Fair City actor
- Richard Sadlier, former Republic of Ireland soccer international
- Carly Smithson, singer, lived here until she moved to the United States

== See also ==
- List of towns and villages in Ireland
