= Crilley =

Crilley is an Irish surname. It is a spelling variation of Crilly, which is itself an Anglicized version of the Gailge patronymic Mac Raghailligh (son of Raghailleach).

Notable people with this surname include:

- Frank William Crilley (1883–1947), American diver
- Mark Crilley (born 1966), American manga artist
- Willie Crilley (1903–1955), Scottish footballer

== See also ==
- Crilly (disambiguation)
