= Twig (film) =

- Theatrical release poster
- Directed by: Marian Quinn
- Written by: Marian Quinn
- Based on: Antigone by Sophocles
- Produced by: Ruth Carter; Tommy Weir; Patrick O'Neill
- Starring: Sade Malone; Brian F. O'Byrne; Ghaliah Conroy; Donncha Tynan
- Cinematography: Declan Quinn
- Edited by: Tony Cranstoun
- Music by: Gerry Leonard
- Production companies: Blue Ink Films; Janey Pictures
- Distributed by: Wildcard Distribution
- Release date: 24 June 2024 (Ireland)
- Running time: 105 minutes
- Country: Ireland
- Language: English
- Budget: €1,800,000 (estimated)
- Box office: $12,173

Twig is a 2024 Irish drama film written and directed by Marian Quinn. A contemporary adaptation of Sophocles' Antigone, the film premiered as the opening title of the 2024 Dublin International Film Festival. The film would go on to screen at the Woodstock Film Festival, where it was nominated for the Gigantic Pictures Award for Best Feature Narrative. The cast includes Sade Malone, Brian F. O'Byrne, Ghaliah Conroy, and Donncha Tynan.

== Plot ==
A woman dreams of escape from a divided Dublin. Her brother's gangland feud traps the people in a culture of fear, surveillance and containment. When tragedy strikes, she seeks to do the right thing, stand up to King Leon and face her fate.

== Cast ==
- Sade Malone as Twig
- Brian F. O'Byrne as Leon
- Ghaliah Conroy as Issy
- Donncha Tynan as Eamon
- Susan McKeown as Teresa
- Kate Stanley Brennan as Eunice
- Jade Jordan as Irene
- Emmet Farrell as Buttsie
- Jack Meade as Jason
- Justin Daniels Anene as Paulie
- Kwaku Fortune as Eddie
- Naoise Kelly as Mikayla
- Jimmy Smallhorne as Joe Handles
- Gail Fitzpatrick as Bessie
- Áine Flanagan as Ange
- Gina Costigan as Ange's Mother
- Morgan C. Jones as Undertaker
- Shauna Higgins as Natalie
- Gemma Kane as Ronnie Farrell
- John Dalessandro as Taxi Driver
- Sorcha Curley as Neighbor
- Georgina McKevitt as Eunice's Friend

== Reception ==
The film received mixed to positive reviews; Many reviewers lauded Sade Malone's portrayal of Twig and Quinns's vision as a filmmaker.

Alan Hunter of Screen International noted "There is no lack of ambition in Twig, as writer/director Marian Quinn attempts to transpose Thebian tragedy to the streets of modern Dublin. Her contemporary version of ’Antigone’ doesn’t always hit the mark, although it retains some of the impact of Sophocles’ tale of internecine conflict, lone wolf defiance and bloodshed."

Declan Burke of The Irish Examiner awarded the film 3/5 stars, noting "Twig is occasionally too literal as it attempts to graft Greek tragedy onto a contemporary Irish setting — the dialogue, especially, is a little on the nose as the characters stomp around declaring their intentions. And yet the blend of old and new is also strikingly effective: the sight of quasi-fascistic armed guards enforcing an autocrat’s diktats is a chillingly timeless one."

Chris Wasser of The Irish Independent was more critical of the film, noting "A modern remix of Sophocles’s Antigone, Twig tells a familiar tale with a contemporary twist, and this moody, atmospheric film longs to be taken seriously. Sadly, its theatrical roots get in the way of a promising crime yarn.Overwritten and largely suspenseless, Twig feels like a clunky stage play pretending to be a film, and that’s a shame. Malone, however, is a force of nature, a beguiling lead in an unsteady presentation. She deserves to be huge."

== Awards ==
Year	Association	Category	Nominee	Result	Ref.
2024	Dublin International Film Festival	Best Irish Feature Film	Marian Quinn	Nominated	
2024	Woodstock Film Festival	Gigantic Pictures Award for Best Feature Narrative	Marian Quinn	Nominated	
