= Art Malik =

British actor (born 1952)

- Born: Athar ul-Haque Malik; 13 November 1952 (age 73); Bahawalpur, Punjab, Pakistan
- Education: Bec School
- Alma mater: Guildhall School of Music and Drama
- Occupation: Actor
- Years active: 1978–present
- Spouse: Gina Rowe (m. 1980)
- Children: 2

Athar ul-Haque Malik (Urdu: اطہر الحق ملک; born 13 November 1952), known as Art Malik, is a British actor. He achieved international fame in the 1980s through his starring and supporting roles in assorted British television serials and films. His breakout role was as Hari Kumar in the television serial The Jewel in the Crown (1984), which earned him a British Academy Television Award nomination for Best Actor.

Malik starred as Zubin Khan on the BBC One medical drama Holby City (2003–2005), Francesc Gacet on Borgia (2011–2014), and Bunny Latif on Homeland (2014–2020). He is also well-known for his roles as Kamran Shah in the James Bond film The Living Daylights (1987) and the villain Salim Abu Aziz in the action comedy film True Lies (1994).

== Early life and education ==
Malik was born Athar ul-Haque Malik on 13 November 1952 in Bahawalpur, Pakistan, the son of Zaibunisa and Mazhar ul-Haque Malik, a doctor who worked as an ophthalmic surgeon in Britain. When his father got a job as a surgeon in Moorfields Eye Hospital, Malik was brought to London in 1956, aged three. From the age of eleven, he attended Bec School in Tooting.

Following an unsatisfactory stint of business studies and a term studying acting at The Questors Theatre, he won a scholarship to Guildhall School of Music and Drama. Before long, he was working with The Old Vic and Royal Shakespeare companies.

== Career ==
In 1982, five years after leaving Guildhall, Malik was cast as Hari Kumar in the Granada Television production of The Jewel in the Crown, based on Paul Scott's Raj Quartet.

In 1987, he played Kamran Shah, an Afghan mujahideen leader who allies with James Bond and leads a raid against Soviet invaders in the 007 film The Living Daylights.

Malik played the role of the son of an Indian mobster in the 1992 film City of Joy and, in 1993, narrated Salman Rushdie's Haroun and the Sea of Stories on BBC television's Jackanory.

In 1994, Malik played his first big screen villain, Salim Abu Aziz, a stereotypical Islamist, opposite Arnold Schwarzenegger in True Lies. Malik accepted the role, which he described as "a hoot", at a time when he had been 14 months without work and was being pursued by the Inland Revenue for £32,000. Following his appearance in True Lies, Malik was offered several roles in other action films, but turned them down, later explaining, "I didn't want to do action movies that weren't as good." He instead accepted a role in the film Clockwork Mice. Malik took a lead role of Nirad Das in the premiere in Guildford and West End production of Tom Stoppard's 1995 play Indian Ink.

In 1999, Malik played the supporting role of Olympos, the court doctor to Cleopatra, Queen of Egypt, in the ABC miniseries Cleopatra.

In 2001, he narrated the television documentary Hajj: The Journey of a Lifetime for broadcast on BBC Two and in 2002 he narrated the three part television mini-series The British Empire in Colour for TWI/Carlton Television.

He also played Milkha Singh's father in the 2013 Hindi language film Bhaag Milkha Bhaag, his first appearance in a film produced in India. Malik had a starring role in Tom Fontana's historical television series Borgia, which ran from 2011 to 2014.

In 2014, Malik played Bunran "Bunny" Latif, a retired Pakistani general in season four of Homeland, returning in the same role in season eight in 2020.

In 2017 he appeared in the first series of Bancroft.

Malik appeared in the second episodes of both series 8 of the show Doc Martin in 2017 and series 11 of Doctor Who, "The Ghost Monument" in 2018.

== Personal life ==
By Malik's account, the sudden success he enjoyed in 1984 resulted in his excessive drinking. "I was surrounded by people who admired me and I took all of that home with me" he said when interviewed in 2003. "I paid lots of attention to my ego, and not enough to my spirit. It was totally unhealthy, like an illness". The result was a strain on his marriage, leading to his wife leaving him. He also ran up high bills on his credit card, and by 1993 he owed £55,000 to the bank and £32,000 to the Inland Revenue, and was on the verge of being declared bankrupt when he got the lucrative part of Salim Abu Aziz, a terrorist, in James Cameron's True Lies. He and his wife reunited.

Malik played a big role in fundraising for relief work for victims of the Gujarat earthquake in 2001, and also appeared on the DEC Pakistan Floods Appeal advertisement in 2010. He lives with his wife Gina Rowe, a fellow student at the Guildhall, whom he married in 1980. They have two daughters, Jessica and Keira. Although from a Muslim background, and having insisted that his character on Holby City should be a Muslim, Malik describes himself as "not a practising Muslim. I'm probably an apostate, and liable for any right-minded Muslim fundamentalist to put me on a list of people to stamp out".

== Filmography ==
=== Film ===
Year	Title	Role	Notes
1979	Arabian Adventure	Mamhoud	
1980	Richard's Things	Dr. Mustag	
1984	A Passage to India	Ali	
1985	Underworld	Fluke	
1987	The Living Daylights	Kamran Shah	
1992	Turtle Beach	Kanan	
1992	City of Joy	Ashok Ghatak	
1992	Year of the Comet	Nico	
1992	Hostage	Khalim	
1994	Uncovered	Alvaro	
1994	True Lies	Salim Abu Aziz	
1995	Clockwork Mice	Laney	
1995	A Kid in King Arthur's Court	Lord Belasco	
1997	Booty Call	Akmed	Uncredited
1998	Side Streets	Bipin Raj	
2001	Tabloid	Philip Radcliffe	
2002	Out Done	Inspector Harrison	
2003	Tempo	George Maldonado	
2004	Fakers	Foster Wright	
2006	Nina's Heavenly Delights	Raj Khanna	
2008	Dean Spanley	Swami Nala Prash	
2008	Franklyn	Tarrant	
2010	The Wolfman	Singh	
2010	Sex and the City 2	Shiekh Khalid	
2011	Everywhere and Nowhere	Uncle Mirza	
2011	Ghosted	Ahmed	
2012	John Carter	Zodangan General	
2013	Bhaag Milkha Bhaag	Sampuran Singh	
2013	Diana	Samundar	
2016	The Infiltrator	Akbar Bilgrami	
2016	Mirzya	Suchitra's father	
2017	Halal Daddy	Amir Aziz	
2023	The Little Mermaid	Grimsby	
2024	The Glassworker	Tomas Oliver	
2025	Hamlet	Claudius	
2025	The Woman in Cabin 10	Dr. Robert Mehta	
2026	Fortitude †	Ian Fleming	Upcoming film

=== Television ===
Year	Title	Role	Notes
1978	Mixed Blessings	Fred	Episode: "The Loneliness of the Long Term Unemployed"
1978	The Professionals	Doctor	2 episodes
1979	ITV Playhouse	Dave	Episode: "The Reaper"
1981	Crown Court	Aziz Ul Haque	Episode: "Freedom to Incite: Part 1"
1982	The Gentle Touch	Turk	Episode: "Be Lucky Uncle"
1983	Bergerac	Ravi Chavan	Episode: "A Miracle Every Week"
1983	Chessgame	Farouk	Episode: "Digging Up the Future"
1984	The Far Pavilions	Zarin	2 episodes
1984	The Jewel in the Crown	Hari Kumar	6 episodes
1984	Minder	Shamy	Episode: "What Makes Shamy Run?"
1985	The Black Tower	Julius Court	5 episodes
1986	Harem	Tarik Pasha	Television film
1986	West of Paradise	Sam McBride	Television film
1986	The Deadly Recruits	Farouk	Television film
1986	Death Is Part of the Process	Indres	Television film
1988	Hothouse	Dr. Ved Lahari	7 episodes
1989	After the War	Jerome LeBlanc	2 episodes
1989	Shadow of the Cobra	Charles Sobhraj	2 episodes
1990	Stolen	Salim	6 episodes
1990	Boon	Alex Cavendish	Episode: "The Tender Trap"
1991	The Storyteller: Greek Myths	Orpheus	Episode: "Orpheus & Eurydice"
1992	Covington Cross	Salim	Episode: "Revenge"
1993	Jackanory	Reader	Episode: "Haroun and the Sea of Stories"
1993	Age of Treason	Pertinax	Television film
1994	The Wimbledon Poisoner	Karim Jackson	2 episodes
1996	Kavanagh QC	Ashok Prasad QC	Episode: "Job Satisfaction"
1996	Peak Practice	Mr. Hussain	Episode: "Heart and Soul"
1997	Turning World	Shams	3 episodes
1997	Path to Paradise: The Untold Story of the World Trade Center Bombing	Ramzi Yousef	Television film
1998	Big Women	Jemal	Episode: "Well, I'm Sorry"
1998	Colour Blind	Hassan	2 episodes
1998, 2015	Goodness Gracious Me	Various	2 episodes
1998–1999	Unfinished Business	Tam	7 episodes
1999	Vicious Circle	Harrison	Television film
1999	The Seventh Scroll	Taita	3 episodes
1999	Life Support	Dr. Kamran Blake	6 episodes
1999	Cleopatra	Olympos	2 episodes
2000	In the Beginning	Ramesses II	2 episodes
2000	Second Sight: Hide and Seek	Faiz Ahmed	Television film
2001	Hotel!	Radochek Zeigler	Television film
2001	Messiah	D.C.S. Emerson	2 episodes
2001	The Real Shirley Bassey	Narrator	Television film
2002	Fun at the Funeral Parlour	Duke of Hypnotism	Episode: "A Pocket Full of Gravel"
2002	Murder in Mind	Paul Asher	Episode: "Flashback"
2003	Messiah 2: Vengeance Is Mine	D.C.S. Emerson	2 episodes
2003–2005	Holby City	Zubin Khan	94 episodes
2005	The English Harem	Saaman "Sam" Sahar	Television film
2006	The Gil Mayo Mysteries	Marcus Illingworth	Episode: "Late of This Parish"
2006	Dalziel and Pascoe	Aahil Khan	Episode: "A Death in the Family"
2006	The Path to 9/11	Colonel Raymond Malik	2 episodes
2008	10 Days to War	Abdul Aziz al-Hakim	Episode: "$100 Coffee"
2008	Doctor Who: The Eighth Doctor Adventures	Abbot Absolute	Episode: "The Skull of Sobek"
2009	Lewis	Professor Hamid Jassim	Episode: "Allegory of Love"
2010	Agatha Christie's Poirot	Sir Bartholomew Strange	Episode: "Three Act Tragedy"
2010	Ben Hur	Sheikh Ilderim	2 episodes
2010	The Nativity	Nicolaus	4 episodes
2010–2012	Upstairs Downstairs	Mr. Amanjit Singh	9 episodes
2011–2014	Borgia	Francesc Gacet	32 episodes
2012	Masterpiece Mystery	Sir Bartholomew Strange	Episode: "Poirot XI: Three Act Tragedy"
2013	New Tricks	Jonathan Epstein	Episode: "The Little Brother"
2014–2020	Homeland	Bunny Latif	7 episodes
2015	Arthur & George	Rev Shapurji Edalji	3 episodes
2015	Undercover	Raffi	Episode #1.6
2016	Indian Summers	Maharajah	2 episodes
2016	Cold Feet	Eddie Zubayr	7 episodes
2017	Sherlock	Prison Governor	Episode: "The Final Problem"
2017	Doc Martin	John Rahmanzai	Episode: "Sons and Lovers"
2017	Bancroft	Alan Taheeri	4 episodes
2018	The Woman in White	Erasmus Nash	5 episodes
2018	Doctor Who	Ilin	Episode: "The Ghost Monument"
2019	Silent Witness	Arthur Pujari	Episode: "Betrayal"
2019	The Feed	President Quan	3 episodes
2020–2025	Man Like Mobeen	Uncle Khan	6 episodes
2020	Penance	Fr. Tom Hayes	all 3 episodes
2024	Renegade Nell	Henry Taplow	1 episode
2024	The Famous Five	Sir Lincoln Aubrey	Episode: "The Eye Of The Sunrise"
2026	VisionQuest	Simon Moorhouse	Episode #3: Reboot
