= Secret of the Cave (2006 film) =

- Film poster
- Directed by: Zach C. Gray
- Produced by: David George; Benjamin Keith; Mark Thomas; Thomas L. Wentworth
- Starring: Kevin Novotny; Patrick Bergin; Joseph Kelly; Niall O'Brien; Niamh Finn; Maria McDermottroe
- Music by: John Carta
- Distributed by: First Look Studios
- Release dates: October 20, 2006; September 4, 2007 (DVD)
- Running time: 88 minutes
- Language: English

Secret of the Cave is a 2006 student film by the School of Visual Art and Design at Southern Adventist University. The film is an adaptation of the 1920 children's story of the same name by Arthur S. Maxwell (also known as Uncle Arthur). It was released on DVD in September 2007 and is distributed by First Look Studios in conjunction with Carmel Entertainment.

== Plot ==
The film follows a young American boy named Roy Wallace (Kevin Novotny) who spends his summer in a tiny fishing village on the coast of western Ireland. After a short while, unexplainable events and deeds begin to occur and rumors of ghosts sweep the village. All these things are pointing to something mysterious that is going on in a nearby cave. Roy sets out to disprove the rumor and decides to explore the cave with his new, teenage local friends Oscar (Gareth O'Connor) and Abbey (Niamh Finn). Roy faces his fears and discovers the secret of the cave.

== Cast ==
- Kevin Novotny as Roy Wallace
- Patrick Bergin as Patrick Wallace
- Joseph Kelly as Peter McDonald
- Niall O'Brien as Uncle Wallace
- Niamh Finn as Abbey
- Maria McDermottroe as Mrs. MacIntyre
- Noelle Brown as Aunt Mary
- Sean Murphy as Pastor
- Gareth O'Connor as Oscar
- Jim Roche as Edmund

== Book ==
The film is based on the 1920 children's book of the same name by Arthur S. Maxwell (also known as "Uncle Arthur"). The book has sold more than 142,000 copies worldwide in English, Spanish, Portuguese, Icelandic, Danish, and Swedish.

The film differs from the book in a few ways, due mostly due to the fact that the book was set in 1920s and the film was set in the 2000s. The book has Roy's two local friends as male, teenage brothers. The film has them as brother and sister. In the film, Roy, the main character, is from America, whereas the book suggests that Roy is from Europe. The story is set in Scotland, while the film uses Ireland as a backdrop, and adds Abbey as a "strong female counterpart to Roy."

== Reception ==
Madelyn Ritrosky, writing for Entertainment Magazine Online, described the Secret of the Cave as a "fun, mysterious, adventurous family film that the entire family can enjoy." Richard Propes of Independent Critic gave the film a B− (2.5 stars), praising the production design, cinematography and some of the performances in the film, but noting the film's "easygoing pace" as a "hard sell for American audiences". The film won the 2006 Crystal Heart Award from the Heartland Film Festival in Indianapolis, Indiana. The Crystal Heart Award was presented to the crew and cast from the Secret of the Cave at the festival award gala by Jon Voight. It was also nominated as one of five films to receive Grand Prize for Best Dramatic Feature Award at the film festival. The film has received the Dove Foundation "Family-Approved" seal. The film's website is a 2006 W3 Server Award winner.

== Behind the scenes ==
According to one of the film's producers, Secret of the Cave took three and a half years to produce. The film's website lists the shooting locations as Achill Island, County Mayo, Ireland. The island on which the film was shot has a broadband connection faster than most other rural parts of Ireland. About 11 miles of raw footage was shot. The cave, a central part of the film, was not discovered until 2 or 3 days before the scheduled shoot. It was discovered by a crew member, walking during a break.
