= Dunamaise Arts Centre =

Arts centre and theatre in Portlaoise, County Laois, Ireland

- Amharclann Dhún Másc
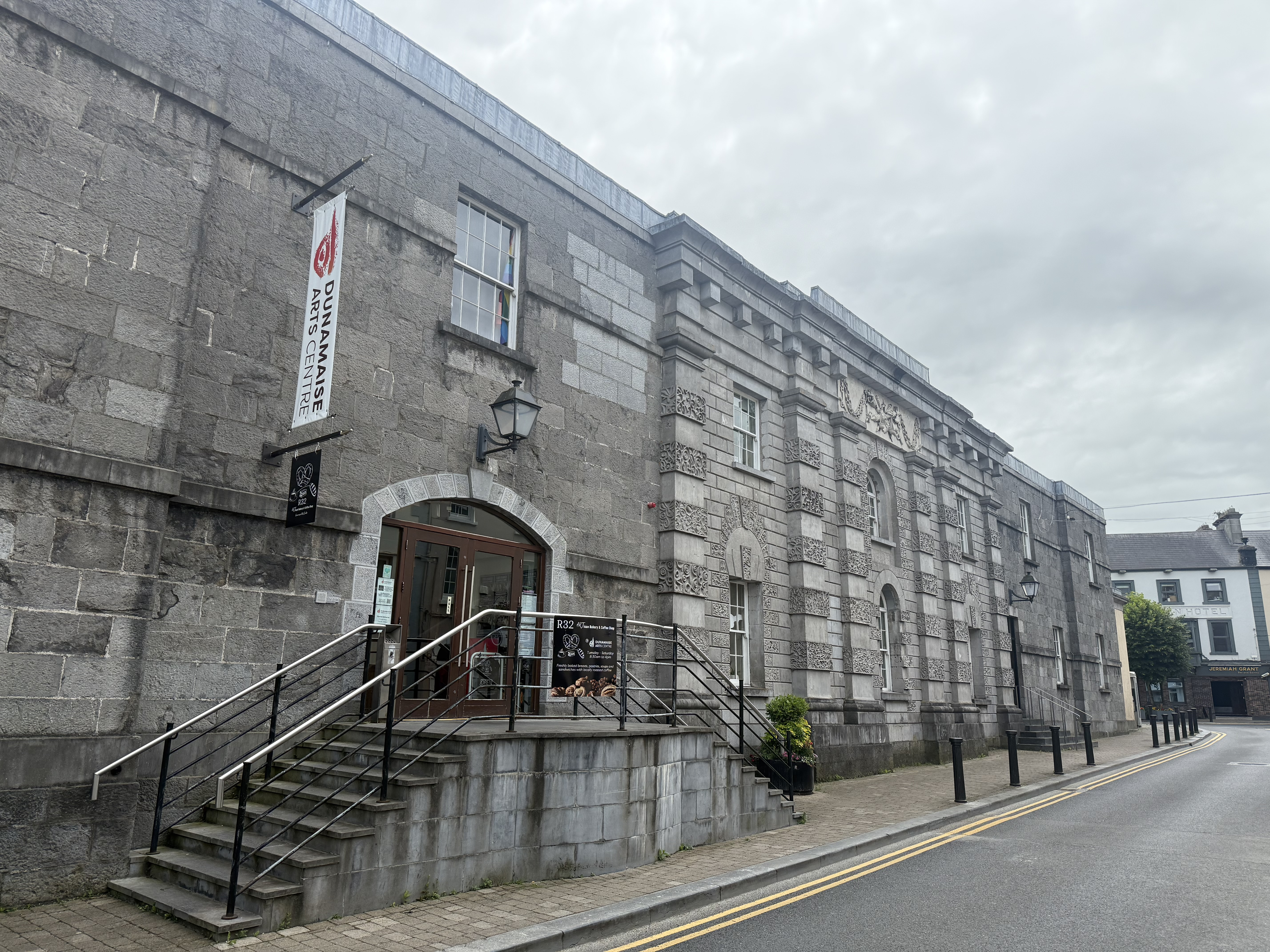
- Dunamaise Arts Centre

- Location within Ireland
- Former names: Maryborough Gaol
- Address: Church Street
- Location: Portlaoise, County Laois, Ireland
- Coordinates: 53°02′04″N 7°18′00″W
- Owner: The Laois Arts Theatre CLG, t/a Dunamaise Arts Centre
- Capacity: 238
- Public transit: Bus: Laois Shopping Centre stop (bus route 735); Rail: Portlaoise railway station
- Parking: City Park @ Church Street

Construction
- Opened: May 1999
- Architect: Richard Harman

Website
- dunamaise.ie

Dunamaise Arts Centre is a multidisciplinary arts centre and theatre on Church Street in Portlaoise, County Laois, Ireland. Established by Laois County Council, it opened in May 1999 in a converted eighteenth-century county gaol.

The centre contains a 240-seat theatre and cinema, visual-art gallery, workshop and meeting spaces, bar and café facilities. Its programme includes professional touring theatre, music, dance, film and visual art alongside performances and projects by local community organisations.

The premises are owned by Laois County Council, while the centre is operated by the charitable company The Laois Arts Theatre Company CLG. Its principal public funders are Laois County Council and the Arts Council.

== Building history ==
The arts centre incorporates the surviving portions of Portlaoise's former county gaol. The National Inventory of Architectural Heritage dates the neo-classical building to about 1789 and attributes it to Richard Harman, who had worked as James Gandon's clerk of works at the Custom House in Dublin.

The original gaol was a seven-bay, two-storey building over a concealed basement, with a three-bay central breakfront. Its limestone façade incorporates giant Doric pilasters, rusticated stonework and unusual vermiculated decoration. The National Inventory of Architectural Heritage rates the surviving building as being of regional importance for its architectural, artistic, historical, scientific and social interest.

The gaol was superseded by a new county prison on the Dublin Road in about 1830. The surviving Church Street building subsequently had other civic uses. Much of the old gaol interior was eventually removed, although its principal façade, part of the rear and north elevations and some roof timbers survived the conversion into the arts centre.

The adjoining courthouse and former gaol form what the National Inventory of Architectural Heritage describes as one of the principal historic architectural groupings in central Portlaoise.

== Development of the arts centre ==
Plans to provide a dedicated arts venue in Portlaoise preceded the centre's eventual opening by more than a decade. In a 2009 retrospective, the centre's then director Louise Donlon recalled that Laois County Council had identified the former gaol as a possible arts centre after vacating the building in 1984. Architectural plans and costings were subsequently prepared before national capital funding for regional arts infrastructure became available.

The project became one of the first arts venues developed under the Government's Cultural Development Incentive Scheme (CDIS), an initiative associated with Minister for Arts Michael D. Higgins which sought to improve arts infrastructure outside the major metropolitan centres. The Irish Times subsequently put the CDIS contribution to the Dunamaise project at approximately €1.3 million.

Funding for the development also came from Laois County Council and arts-development sources. The design and construction project was led by Milligan Reside & Larkin Architects, with M. Glennon Ltd as the principal contractor.

The conversion retained the historically important stone façade while creating a modern theatre and arts complex behind it. Archaeological work during the redevelopment uncovered human remains predating the conversion; the finds were believed to relate to the site's earlier judicial and prison use.

== Opening ==
The Dunamaise Theatre and Centre for the Arts, as it was described at the time, formally opened on 4 May 1999. The opening was performed by Síle de Valera, then Minister for Arts, Heritage, Gaeltacht and the Islands.

Contemporary coverage in The Irish Times described the project as filling a longstanding gap in cultural provision in the rapidly growing town. At opening, the venue was described as containing a purpose-built 220-seat theatre with retractable seating, two exhibition areas, workshop and meeting rooms, a restaurant and bar.

The first programme included appearances by the Abbey Theatre, Fishamble and Belfast's Big Telly Theatre Company, as well as readings, music and exhibitions. The venue also became a base for the Bealtaine literature festival in Laois.

== Facilities ==
The principal auditorium is now described as having 240 seats. It has a proscenium stage measuring approximately 12.8 metres (42 ft) wide by 7.9 metres (26 ft) deep, with a grid height of approximately 7 metres (23 ft).

The auditorium is used for theatre, music, dance, cinema, rehearsals, recordings, conferences and other events. Its seating can be reconfigured for different uses.

The centre also includes a visual-art gallery, a mezzanine space accommodating smaller performances and workshops, meeting and creative spaces, a theatre bar and café.

== Programming ==
Dunamaise operates principally as a receiving venue, presenting touring professional productions alongside locally produced work. Its programme encompasses theatre, music, dance, film, visual art and multidisciplinary work.

Companies and organisations to have presented work at the centre include the Abbey Theatre, Gate Theatre, Druid Theatre Company, Fishamble, Ballet Ireland and the RTÉ National Symphony Orchestra. Musicians who have appeared there include The Chieftains, Christy Moore, Paul Brady, Sharon Shannon, Josh Ritter, Martin Hayes and Jack Lukeman.

The centre also screens Irish and international films in collaboration with organisations including [[access>CINEMA]] and the Irish Film Institute.

Its visual-arts programme includes solo and group exhibitions, community projects, workshops, artists' talks and professional-development events.

== Community role ==
Community participation formed part of the centre's remit from its establishment. In 2009, Donlon described local amateur theatre and musical groups as an integral part of Dunamaise rather than simply hirers of the building. She noted that the local musical society, which had ceased operating during the 1980s when it lacked a suitable venue, re-formed when Dunamaise opened in 1999.

Local organisations using the centre have included Laois Open Door Theatre, Fourth Wall Theatre, Portlaoise Musical Society, Portlaoise Panto and community choirs.

The centre also supports artist residencies, commissions and development projects. Its activities include programmes for young people, schools and community organisations and schemes intended to support professional artists based in Laois and the wider Midlands.

== NASC network ==
Dunamaise is a member of NASC, a network of regional Irish performing-arts venues formed in 2006 to collaborate on programming and touring productions. Other members include An Grianán Theatre in Letterkenny, Pavilion Theatre in Dún Laoghaire, Town Hall Theatre, Galway, Siamsa Tíre in Tralee, glór in Ennis, Backstage Theatre in Longford and the Lime Tree Theatre in Limerick.

The network was created to allow regional venues to pool programming, marketing and technical expertise and to make larger-scale touring productions more viable outside Dublin.

== Organisation and funding ==
Dunamaise Arts Centre is operated by The Laois Arts Theatre Company CLG, a company limited by guarantee and registered charity. Its board serves on a voluntary basis.

The property itself remains in the ownership of Laois County Council. The centre receives annual support from the council and the Arts Council, supplemented by ticket income, venue hire, fundraising, sponsorship and other revenue.

An Arts Council report in 2003 described Dunamaise as one of the first venues developed under the Cultural Development Incentive Scheme and noted that its Arts Council funding was then based on a joint funding arrangement with Laois County Council.

== 25th anniversary ==
Dunamaise celebrated its 25th anniversary in 2024 with a programme of performances and visual-art events. Anniversary events included an exhibition of new work by Swedish-Irish artist Cecilia Danell and performances involving Irish musicians including Lisa Hannigan, Gemma Hayes and Paul Noonan.

== See also ==
- Portlaoise
- Rock of Dunamase
- Culture of Ireland
- Theatre in Ireland
