= Vicious Circle (1999 film) =

- Genre: Crime drama
- Written by: Kieran Prendiville
- Directed by: David Blair
- Starring: Ken Stott; Gerard McSorley; Andrew Connolly; John Kavanagh; Art Malik; Michelle Fairley; Michael Liebmann; Norman Rodway
- Composer: Stephen McKeon
- Country of origin: United Kingdom
- Original language: English
- No. of episodes: 1

Production
- Executive producers: Robert Cooper; Kevin Menton; Nigel Warren-Green
- Producer: Sue Austen
- Production locations: Aberdeenshire, Scotland
- Cinematography: Fred Tammes
- Editor: Melanie Adams
- Running time: 100 minutes
- Production company: BBC Northern Ireland

Original release
- Network: BBC1
- Release: 9 February 1999

Vicious Circle is a single British television crime drama film, written by former Tomorrow's World presenter Kieran Prendiville, that first broadcast on BBC1 on 9 February 1999. Based loosely on The General by Irish journalist Paul Williams, Vicious Circle follows notorious Irish criminal Martin Cahill as he undertakes a high stakes jewellery robbery, stealing loot worth more than a million pounds. The film was directed by David Blair.

The film was released on DVD via Just Entertainment in the Netherlands in 2004, but this remains the only home video release to date.

== Production ==
When questioned about the film's similarities to The General and Ordinary Decent Criminal, producer Sue Austen emphasised; "Ours isn't just the Martin Cahill story. It's a story about a Dublin gangster coming up against an IRA operative and a policeman, both of whom we've invented, and the three of them constantly circling each other. It doesn't deal with any of the events of his earlier life. We start at the time of the O'Connor's raid, and go straight down the line with an exciting piece of drama. We've compressed the events, going through the whole Kilakee episode, up to his death and our other characters' reaction to it."

== Reception ==
James Rampton from The Independent gave the film a positive review, writing; "Ken Stott has just the right screen presence for the role of Cahill. He brings a sense of wordless menace to the character without making him a cardboard cut-out baddie. He makes Cahill a man who cares deeply for his pigeons and at the same time is capable of cold-bloodedly nailing a traitor's hands to the floor."

== Cast ==
- Ken Stott as Martin Cahill
- Gerard McSorley as Crowley
- Andrew Connolly as Detective Declan Finney
- John Kavanagh as IRA Chief Charlie Rice
- Art Malik as Harrison
- Michelle Fairley as Frances
- Michael Liebmann as Barry
- Norman Rodway as Hagarty
- Luke Griffin as Molloy
- Cathy White as Tina
- Tommy O'Neill as Gene
- Pat Ainscough as Arthur
- Stuart Dunne as Niall
- Owen O'Gorman as Austin
- Breffni McKenna as Clive
- Pat Kinevane as Pat
