= Halal Daddy =

2017 Irish-French film

- Directed by: Conor McDermottroe
- Screenplay by: Conor McDermottroe; Mark O'Halloran
- Produced by: Hermann Florin; Ailish McElmeel
- Starring: Sarah Bolger; Colm Meaney; David Kross; Art Malik
- Cinematography: Mel Griffith
- Edited by: Alexander Dittner; Constantin von Seld
- Music by: Matthias Weber
- Release date: June 26, 2017 (Edinburgh)
- Running time: 95 minutes
- Countries: France; Ireland; Germany
- Language: English

Halal Daddy is a 2017 Irish-German-French comedy film featuring Sarah Bolger, Colm Meaney, David Kross and Art Malik.

== Plot ==
Raghdan Aziz, a young British-Indian Muslim man, has moved out of his strict parents' home in Bradford, England to live with his aunt and uncle in Sligo, Ireland. He enjoys spending time with his girlfriend Maeve and his two best friends Derek and Omar. Then his father Amir arrives, with a plan to turn a local abattoir into a halal butcher's shop.

== Cast ==
- Sarah Bolger as Maeve Logan
- Colm Meaney as Martin Logan
- Art Malik as Amir Aziz
- David Kross as Jasper
- Jerry Iwu as Neville
- Mark O'Halloran as Omar
- Nikesh Patel as Raghdan Aziz
- Paul Tylak as Jamal Aziz
- Deirdre O'Kane as Doreen Murphy
- Gina Costigan as Magda
- Stephen Cromwell as Derek
- Maria McDermottroe as Lorraine
- Donal O'Kelly as Leonard

== Reception ==
The film has a 43% approval rating on Rotten Tomatoes based on seven reviews, with an average rating of 6/10. Paul Whitington of the Irish Independent awarded the film two stars. Hilary A. White of the Sunday Independent awarded it three stars. Sarah McIntyre of RTÉ.ie gave the film four stars out of five. Donald Clarke of The Irish Times gave it three stars out of five.
