= A Belfast Story =

- Directed by: Nathan Todd
- Written by: Nathan Todd
- Produced by: John Todd
- Starring: Colm Meaney
- Cinematography: Peter Holland
- Edited by: John Wright
- Music by: Nick Glennie-Smith; Mac Quayle
- Release date: 20 September 2013
- Running time: 99 minutes
- Country: Northern Ireland
- Language: English

A Belfast Story is a 2013 Northern Irish crime thriller film written and directed by Nathan Todd in his feature directorial debut. It stars Colm Meaney as an unnamed Belfast detective investigating the murders of former IRA members in the years following the Troubles. The supporting cast includes Malcolm Sinclair, Tommy O'Neill, Paddy Rocks and Damien Hasson.

== Plot ==
In post-Troubles Belfast, an unnamed Protestant detective nearing retirement is assigned to investigate a series of violent murders targeting former members of the IRA. He is partnered with the younger officer Damien. The detective has little sympathy for the victims, having spent much of his career confronting republican violence and having lost his daughter in an IRA attack.

The killings raise fears that Belfast could return to sectarian conflict. The Chief Constable attempts to contain the investigation, while First Minister Owen McKenna becomes concerned that the violence could expose the past connections of senior political and police figures to paramilitary organisations.

As the number of victims increases, the detective suspects that the murders are not part of a renewed paramilitary campaign but a personal act of revenge. The investigation forces him to confront the difference between legal justice and retribution for crimes committed during the Troubles.

== Cast ==
- Colm Meaney as the Detective
- Malcolm Sinclair as the Chief Constable
- Tommy O'Neill as First Minister Owen McKenna
- Paddy Rocks as Eammon
- Damien Hasson as Damien
- Maggie Cronin as Sinead
- Susan Davey as the First Minister's aide
- Gordon Mahon as Killer 1
- Patrick Buchanan as Killer 2
- Stuart Graham as a crony
- Ian Beattie as Colum
- Tim McGarry as the PS bomber
- Michael O'Flaherty as the chip-shop bomber
- Richard Clements as the narrator

== Reception ==
The film received negative reviews and has a 14% "Rotten" rating on Rotten Tomatoes.

Stephen Dalton of The Hollywood Reporter wrote in his review, "Nathan Todd attempts something similar in his debut feature, a murder mystery with political overtones, but his inexperience lets him down badly." He also added, "not even [Meaney's] heavyweight gravitas can save A Belfast Story from its weak script, sluggish pacing and one-dimensional characters."

Steve Rose of The Guardian gave the film 2 stars out of 5 and wrote, "the plot scatters too many pieces about, putting the film's star off screen for long stretches."

Kevin Harley of GamesRadar+ praised Meaney, the Belfast locations and the film's attempt to complicate the morality of the killings. He nevertheless found that its slow pacing and overwritten dialogue weakened the drama.

A review in The Irish News regarded the premise as ambitious but criticised the film's exposition, limited use of female characters and handling of Northern Irish geography and politics. The review identified the animated opening sequence, the score and scenes featuring Tim McGarry as its stronger elements.

== Controversy ==
A month before its release, the film garnered controversy in Great Britain for the filmmakers' publicity stunt of sending a nail bomb kit to the media to promote the film. Nathan Todd later issued an apology.
