= Swansong: Story of Occi Byrne =

- Theatrical release poster
- Directed by: Conor McDermottroe
- Written by: Conor McDermottroe
- Produced by: Hermann Florin; Edwina Forkin; Tom Maguire
- Starring: Martin McCann; Jodie Whittaker; Gerard McSorley; Marcella Plunkett; Bríd Brennan; Owen Roe; Ian McElhinney
- Cinematography: Alexander du Prel
- Edited by: Mairéad McIvor
- Music by: Dirk Busshart; Carl Carlton; Markus Löhr
- Production companies: Screen Ireland; Zanzibar Films; Florin Film-und Fernsehproduktion
- Distributed by: StudioCanal UK
- Release dates: 11 July 2009 (Galway Film Fleadh); 10 September 2010 (Ireland)
- Running time: 90 minutes
- Country: Ireland
- Language: English
- Budget: $1.8 million

Swansong: Story of Occi Byrne is a 2009 Irish drama film written and directed by Conor McDermottroe. An international co-production between Ireland and Germany, the film premiered in competition at Galway Film Fleadh. The cast includes Martin McCann, Jodie Whittaker, Gerard McSorley, Marcella Plunkett, Bríd Brennan, Owen Roe, and Ian McElhinney.

The film received six nominations from the Irish Film and Television Academy, including Best Film, Best Script for McDermottroe, Best Actor for McCann, and Best Supporting Actress for Plunkett.

== Plot ==
Austin 'Occi' Byrne is brought home to Ireland from London, where he was born after his mother failed to have an abortion. He spends his childhood with his alcoholic mother, being bullied by his peers, and feeling isolated much of the time. Although he doesn't know who his father is, he is certain that someday the father will return and meet him. Later Occi spends years in a mental institution, and when the place is forced to close down, he finds work as a fisherman. While at sea, a death occurs on his trawler. Occi makes it safely back onto land, but things are not exactly looking up for him there either.

== Cast ==
- Martin McCann as Occi Byrne
- Jodie Whittaker as Bridget Byrne
- Gerard McSorley as Michael Byrne
- Bríd Brennan as Theresa Byrne
- Marcella Plunkett as Mary Duggan
- Ian McElhinney as Skip
- Maria McDermottroe as Sister Benedict
- Conor Mullen as Brother Cornelius
- Rúaidhrí Conroy as Ned Foley
- Owen Roe as Doctor Scanlon
- Gina Costigan as Nurse

== Reception ==
The film received mixed to positive reviews; Many reviewers lauded Martin McCann's portrayal of Austin 'Occi' Byrne and McDermottroe's potential as a filmmaker.

In a Review for RTÉ, film critic Harry Guerin awarded the film 3/5 stars, writing "There are goose bumps aplenty watching Belfast man Martin McCann in 'Swansong...', a film which delves into some of the most disturbing aspects of Irish society and what we have done to each other." Guerin would go on to note "Conor McDermottroe's first film as a director is hampered a little by a tight budget (sometimes things move too fast) and two plot developments which don't feel right (one the fate of Occi's fisherman friend, the other the identity of his father). Those aside, however, McDermottroe shows himself to be a filmmaker of real promise who can move from heart-warming to chilling and depict the remedial influence of relationships and cruelty towards the weakest with equal power."

Paul Whitington of The Irish Independent offered similar observations, praising the ensemble of actors, while questioning McDermottroe's "succession of Irish literary clichés."

== Awards ==
| Year | Association | Category | Nominee | Result | Ref. |
|---|---|---|---|---|---|
| 2009 | Galway Film Fleadh | Best Irish Feature Film | Conor McDermottroe | Runner-up | |
| 2010 | Camerimage | Golden Frog | Conor McDermottroe | Nominated | |
| 2010 | Munich Film Festival | Best International Film | Conor McDermottroe | Nominated | |
| 2011 | Irish Film & Television Academy | Best Film | Conor McDermottroe | Nominated | |
| 2011 | Irish Film & Television Academy | Best Script | Conor McDermottroe | Nominated | |
| 2011 | Irish Film & Television Academy | Best Actor | Martin McCann | Won | |
| 2011 | Irish Film & Television Academy | Best Supporting Actress | Marcella Plunkett | Nominated | |
| 2011 | Irish Film & Television Academy | Best Costume Design | Joan O'Clery & Susan Scott | Nominated | |
| 2011 | Irish Film & Television Academy | Best Makeup & Hair | Nina Ayoub & Gill Brennan | Nominated | |
