= Veronica Guerin (film) =

2003 film by Joel Schumacher

- Theatrical poster
- Directed by: Joel Schumacher
- Screenplay by: Carol Doyle; Mary Agnes Donoghue
- Story by: Carol Doyle
- Produced by: Jerry Bruckheimer
- Starring: Cate Blanchett; Gerard McSorley; Ciarán Hinds; Brenda Fricker
- Cinematography: Brendan Galvin
- Edited by: David Gamble
- Music by: Harry Gregson-Williams
- Production companies: Touchstone Pictures; Jerry Bruckheimer Films
- Distributed by: Buena Vista Pictures Distribution
- Release dates: 8 July 2003 (Ireland); 1 August 2003 (United Kingdom); 8 October 2003 (United States)
- Running time: 98 minutes
- Countries: Ireland; United Kingdom; United States
- Language: English
- Budget: $17 million
- Box office: $9.4 million

Veronica Guerin is a 2003 biographical crime film directed by Joel Schumacher from a screenplay by Carol Doyle and Mary Agnes Donoghue. The film stars Cate Blanchett, Gerard McSorley, Ciarán Hinds, and Brenda Fricker. Its plot focuses on Irish journalist Veronica Guerin, whose investigation into the drug trade in Dublin led to her murder in 1996, at the age of 37. The film is the second to be inspired by Guerin's life, following When the Sky Falls (2000).

Veronica Guerin was released by Buena Vista Pictures Distribution in Ireland on 8 July, in the United Kingdom on 1 August and in the United States on 8 October, grossing $9.4 million at the box office against a budget of $17 million. Despite receiving mixed reviews from critics, the film earned eight nominations from the Irish Film & Television Academy, while Blanchett was nominated for the Golden Globe Award for Best Actress in a Motion Picture – Drama.

== Plot ==
Veronica Guerin, a neophyte crime reporter for the Sunday Independent, becomes aware of how much Dublin's illegal drug trade is encroaching upon the lives of its working class, especially the children, and vows to expose the men responsible.

Guerin begins by interviewing the pre-pubescent addicts who "shoot up" on the street or in abandoned sections of the Dublin housing estates. Her investigation requires her to establish a relationship with trafficker John Traynor, who provides her with a great deal of information about the criminal underworld. Traynor is willing to assist Guerin but is not above misleading her in order to protect himself from Dublin mob boss John Gilligan. Notably, he manages to convince her that Gilligan's rival Gerry Hutch, a gangster known as "The Monk", is running heroin. Guerin pursues Hutch, wasting time and resources before discovering that he has no involvement in drugs.

Guerin and her family soon become targets: a bullet is fired through their window and Guerin is shot in the leg by a gunman on her own doorstep. Despite being urged by her loved ones to halt the investigation, Guerin personally confronts Gilligan and is harshly beaten, with Gilligan threatening to rape and kill her son if she doesn't back off. Rather than press charges, which would necessitate her removal from the story, Guerin forges ahead with the investigation.

On 26 June 1996, Guerin appears in court to respond to parking tickets and speeding penalties that she had ignored. She is given a nominal fine of IR£100. En route home, she calls her mother and then her husband to report the good news. She is speaking to her office while stopped at a traffic light on the Naas Dual Carriageway when two men riding a motorcycle pull up beside her. The driver breaks the window of her car and shoots her six times. The two flee and dispose of the bike and gun in a nearby canal.

Guerin is mourned by her family, friends, associates and the country. Her violent death results in the establishment of the Criminal Assets Bureau, and Gilligan, along with several of his men, are tried and sentenced to lengthy prison terms. The epilogue states that "Veronica Guerin's writing turned the tide in the drug war. Her murder galvanised Ireland into action. Thousands of people took to the streets in weekly anti-drug marches, which drove the dealers out of Dublin and forced the drug barons underground. Within a week of her death, in an emergency session of the Parliament, the Government altered the Constitution of the Republic of Ireland to allow the High Court to freeze the assets of suspected drug barons."

== Cast ==
- Cate Blanchett as Veronica Guerin
- Gerard McSorley as John Gilligan
- Ciarán Hinds as John Traynor
- Brenda Fricker as Bernie Guerin
- Don Wycherley as Chris Mulligan
- Gina Costigan as Molly, Traynor's Girlfriend
- Barry Barnes as Graham Turley
- Simon O'Driscoll as Cathal Turley
- Emmet Bergin as Aengus Fanning
- Charlotte Bradley as Anne Harris
- Mark Lambert as Willie Kealy
- Garrett Keogh as Tony Gregory
- Maria McDermottroe as Geraldine Gilligan
- Alan Devine as Gerry Hutch
- Gerry O'Brien as Martin Cahill
- Gabrielle Reidy as Frances Cahill
- Paul Roe as Tommy Mullen
- David Herlihy as Peter "Fatso" Mitchell
- Darragh Kelly as Terry Fagan
- Colin Farrell as Tattoed Boy

== Production ==
The film was shot on location in Dublin and in Naas in County Kildare, with some scenes also being shot near Newtownmountkennedy in County Wicklow.

Colin Farrell makes an appearance as a heavily tattooed young man Guerin briefly engages in conversation about a football match.

== Critical reception ==
Veronica Guerin received mixed reviews from critics. On Rotten Tomatoes, it has an approval rating of 53% based on 142 reviews, with an average rating of 5.9/10. The site's consensus states: "Cate Blanchett gives another great performance in a movie that doesn't shed much light on its title character." On the review aggregator website Metacritic, the film had an average score of 55 out of 100, based on 33 reviews from film critics, indicating "mixed or average reviews".

A. O. Scott of The New York Times called the film "a flat-footed, overwrought crusader-against-evil melodrama, in which Ms. Blanchett's formidable gifts as an actress are reduced to a haircut and an accent. Neither Mr. Schumacher nor Jerry Bruckheimer ... is famous for subtlety, and you expect a movie like this to sacrifice a measure of nuance to be appropriately rousing and emphatic. But the filmmakers have succeeded in making Guerin's fascinating story tedious and formulaic, and in making a real-life drama seem as phony as mediocre television ... [T]he storytelling is so clumsy that very little intrigue develops. Nor does much genuine emotion, a defect that Mr. Schumacher tries to overcome with clever editing and loud, swelling music. Veronica Guerin is disappointing in its lazy glibness; it wastes a somber and heroic story that could have made a fine movie."

Roger Ebert of the Chicago Sun-Times gave it three stars out four and noted: "Cate Blanchett plays Guerin in a way that fascinated me for reasons the movie probably did not intend. I have a sneaky suspicion that director Joel Schumacher and his writers ... think of this as a story of courage and determination, but what I came away with was a story of bone-headed egocentrism ... The film ends with the obligatory public funeral, grateful proles lining the streets while type crawls up the screen telling how much Guerin's anti-drug crusade accomplished. These are standard prompts for us to get a little weepy at the heroism of this brave martyr, but actually I think Blanchett and Schumacher have found the right note for their story."

Mick LaSalle of the San Francisco Chronicle observed, "The film's success hinges on its avoidance of cliché – including ... the lovable anti-heroine – and what emerges is an arresting portrait of a fascinating and somewhat mysterious personality. Congratulations to director Joel Schumacher and screenwriter Carol Doyle for not including the typical Hollywood scene, which usually comes right before the climax, in which the protagonist sums up why she's willing to sacrifice all ... Aside from one lapse into sentimentality ... Joel Schumacher has crafted a smart, brisk thriller. More than that, he's given us a compelling character study and a celebration of a kind of modern woman who just did not exist a few generations ago: competent, professional, living on a cell phone, working into the night."

Peter Travers of Rolling Stone rated the film two out of four stars and commented, "Cate Blanchett is the spark that keeps this well-meaning but by-the-numbers biopic going."

Derek Elley of Variety stated, "It's slickly packaged, looks good in widescreen and toplines Cate Blanchett, but producer Jerry Bruckheimer and helmer Joel Schumacher ... seem boxed in by the very recent story and by the challenge of making a driven, rather foolhardy newspaperwoman into a sympathetic figure. So they have taken an accessible, generic approach to the material, treating it as a star vehicle, with Blanchett, who's in almost every scene, driving the [picture] (though in one of her most actorly and emotionally least convincing [performances])."

Peter Keough of the Boston Phoenix wrote that the film "is based on falsehoods" and added, "But this is a Jerry Bruckheimer movie directed by Joel Schumacher, and shameless exploitation and cheap sentiment take precedence over difficult truths. Instead of a genuine tale of courage, folly, and corruption, this is a crude cartoon of good versus evil that includes Blanchett's worst performance and a conclusion that is one of the more repulsive pieces of emotional pornography since Bruckheimer's Pearl Harbor. Ciarán Hinds brings a touch of class and authenticity with his redolent portrayal of Guerin's underworld contact, John Traynor, but Guerin deserved better, and audiences do too."

Philip French of The Observer called the film "a gripping thriller" "directed by Joel Schumacher at his least mannered" and "produced with uncharacteristic restraint by the leading action movie producer, Jerry Bruckheimer."

== Accolades ==
Cate Blanchett was nominated for the Golden Globe Award for Best Actress – Motion Picture Drama but lost to Charlize Theron in Monster, and the Empire Award for Best Actress, which she lost to Uma Thurman in Kill Bill, Vol. 1.

Irish Film & Television Award nominations went to Ciarán Hinds, Gerard McSorley, and Brenda Fricker for their performances, Brendan Galvin for Best Cinematography, Joan Bergin for Best Costume Design, and Dee Corcoran and Ailbhe Lemass for Best Hair/Make-Up. The film won the UGC Cinemas Audience Award for Best Irish Film.

Joel Schumacher won the Solidarity Award at the San Sebastián International Film Festival.

== Home media ==
The Region 2 DVD was released on 26 January 2004, and the Region 1 DVD was released two months later on 16 March. It is in anamorphic widescreen format with audio tracks in English and French and subtitles in Spanish. Bonus features include commentary by Joel Schumacher; commentary by screenwriters Carol Doyle and Mary Agnes Donoghue; Public Mask, Private Fears, which includes cast and crew interviews; A Conversation with Jerry Bruckheimer; a deleted scene recreating Guerin's speech to the Committee to Protect Journalists; and historical footage of Guerin's speech.

== See also ==
- When the Sky Falls
