= In View (film) =

2016 Irish film

- Theatrical film poster
- Directed by: Ciarán Creagh
- Written by: Ciarán Creagh
- Produced by: Dave Byrne; Ciarán Creagh; Ferdia Doherty; Simon James Doyle
- Starring: Caoilfhionn Dunne; Ciarán McMenamin; Stuart Graham; Maria McDermottroe; Gerard McSorley; Joe McKinney
- Cinematography: David Grennan
- Edited by: Tony Cranstoun
- Release date: March 1, 2016 (Ireland)
- Running time: 93 mins.
- Country: Ireland
- Language: English

In View is a 2016 Irish drama film, written and directed by Ciarán Creagh. It stars Caoilfhionn Dunne, Ciarán McMenamin, Stuart Graham, Maria McDermottroe, Gerard McSorley, and Joe McKinney. It premiered in Ireland in 2016.

== Synopsis ==
Tormented by guilt over the death of her family, Ruth comes to decide that by donating her organs she will placate her utter self-loathing.

== Cast ==
- Caoilfhionn Dunne as Ruth
- Ciarán McMenamin as Denis
- Stuart Graham as Donny
- Maria McDermottroe as Monica
- Gerard McSorley as Séamus
- Joe McKinney as Greg
- Joe Mullins as Magella
- Will O'Connell as Michael O'Brien
- Michael Glenn Murphy as Norman

== Reception ==
Paddy Kehoe of RTÉ rated the film 4/5 stars, calling it "an eviscerating portrait of a female garda in free-fall" and lauding Caoilfhionn Dunne for her "powerful performance". Donald Clarke of The Irish Times stated that it feels "psychologically authentic" and also praised Ciarán Creagh's "brave first feature".

Roe McDermott of Hot Press called Dunne's performance "extraordinary", and applauded Creagh for exploring "the topic of suicide in Ireland". And Niall Murphy of Scannain gave the film a 3.6/5, echoing sentiments about Dunne and extending the appreciation for the supporting cast.
