= Gerard McSorley =

Irish actor (born 1950)

- Born: 1 January 1950 (age 76); Omagh, County Tyrone, Northern Ireland
- Occupation: Actor
- Years active: 1979–present
- Spouse: Ann Harrison Richie (divorced)
- Children: 3

Gerard McSorley (Irish: Gearóid Mac Somhairle; born 1 January 1950) is an Irish theatre, television and film actor.

== Early life ==
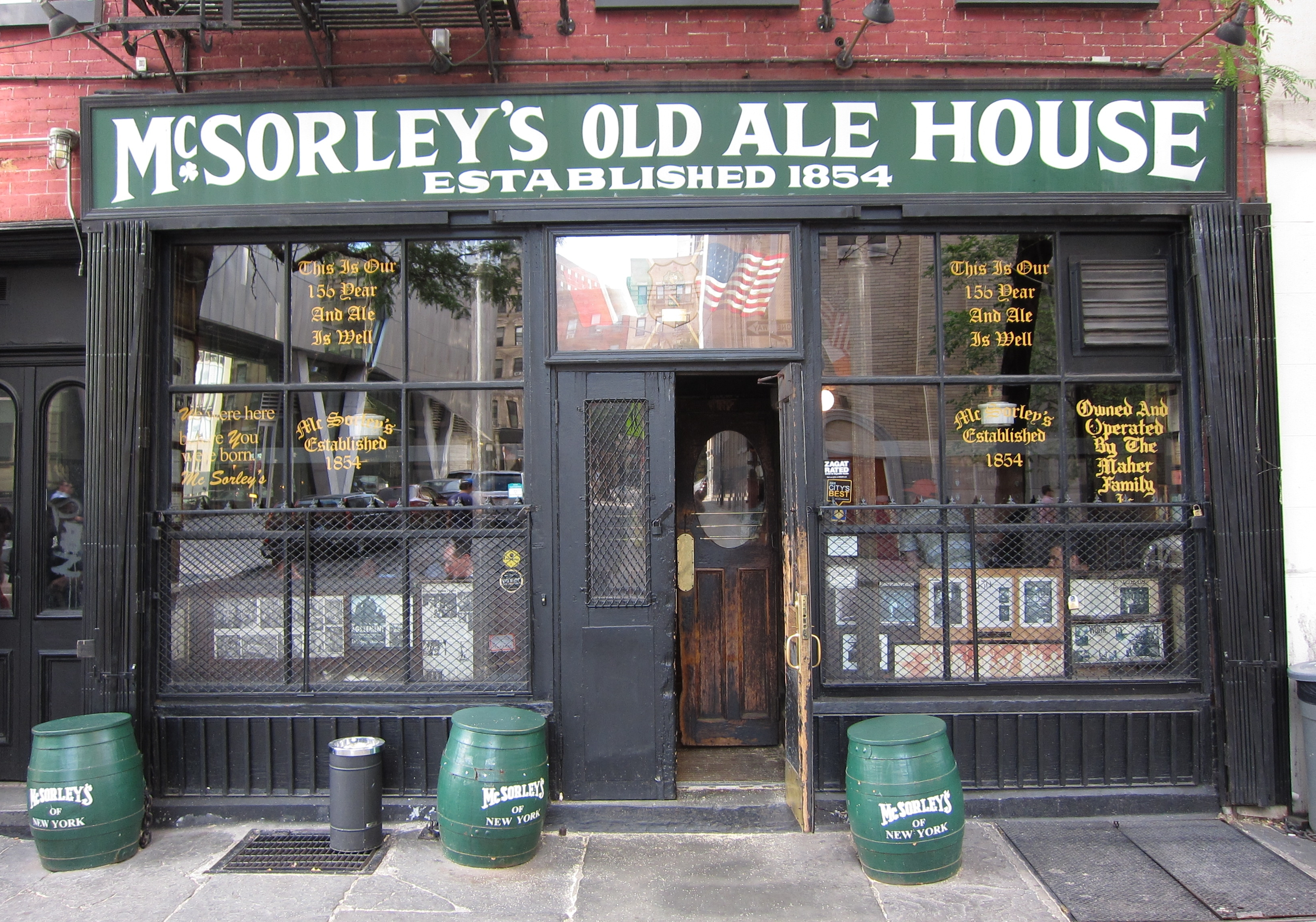
McSorley's Pub, in New York, was opened by an ancestor of Gerard McSorley

He was born in the County Tyrone town of Omagh and, after attending a Christian Brothers school in his hometown, he attended St. Columb's College in Derry. He then attended Queen's University, Belfast, where he was taught by Seamus Heaney. He resides in Gweedore, County Donegal. He is a descendant of John McSorley, who opened McSorley's Old Ale House, the oldest operating pub in New York City.

== Career ==
He spent much of his early career working in theatre, notably at the Abbey Theatre in Dublin. After playing Michael Evans in the original West End and Broadway productions of Brian Friel's play Dancing at Lughnasa in the early 1990s, McSorley started to attract more TV and movie roles. He has appeared in many Hollywood movies including Braveheart (in which his character "Cheltham" was decapitated by William Wallace at the battle of Stirling) and In the Name of the Father.

One of his most celebrated performances was his lead role in Omagh, a feature-length television drama depicting the effect of the Omagh bombing on the residents of the town. He is also known for playing the mysterious "Father Todd Unctious" in the Christmas special episode ("A Christmassy Ted") of the Channel 4 sitcom Father Ted. His film credits include The Constant Gardener, and he was also cast as Queenan in The Departed but had to pull out (Martin Sheen took over the role). McSorley most recently played the role of Robert Aske in the Showtime historical drama The Tudors. He appeared in the 2010 movie Robin Hood, directed by Ridley Scott and starring Russell Crowe.

== Legal issues ==
In November 2019, McSorley was arrested for a breach of the peace. He was also charged with damaging property in a cell at Letterkenny Garda Station. A warrant was issued for his arrest the following month after he failed to appear in court.

== Filmography ==
=== Film ===
- SOS Titanic (1979, TV Movie) – Martin Gallagher
- Angel (1982) – Assistant
- Withdrawal (1982, Short) – Gerry
- Taffin (1988) – Ed
- In the Name of the Father (1993) – Detective Pavis
- Widows' Peak (1994) – Gaffney, Lawyer
- Moondance (1994) – Fr. McGrath
- Words Upon the Window Pane (1994) – Abraham Johnson
- An Awfully Big Adventure (1995) – George
- Braveheart (1995) – Cheltham
- Nothing Personal (1995) – Cecil
- Michael Collins (1996) – Cathal Brugha
- Some Mother's Son (1996) – Fr. Daly
- The Serpent's Kiss (1997) – Mr. Galmoy
- The Butcher Boy (1997) – Psychiatrist #2
- The Boxer (1997) – Harry
- Dancing at Lughnasa (1998) – Narrator (voice)
- Felicia's Journey (1999) – Felicia's Father
- Agnes Browne (1999) – Mr. Aherne
- Angela's Ashes (1999) – Father Gregory
- Ordinary Decent Criminal (2000) – Harrison
- On The Edge (2001) – Rachel's Father
- Do Armed Robbers Have Love Affairs? (2001, Short) – Eddy
- Bloody Sunday (2002) – Chief Supt. Lagan
- The Wayfarer (2003, Short) – Nat
- Dead Bodies (2003) – Gordon Ellis
- Veronica Guerin (2003, Nominated for a 2003 Irish Film and Television Award for Best Supporting Actor) – John Gilligan
- The Halo Effect (2004) – O'Grady
- Omagh (2004, TV Movie, Won a 2004 Irish Film and Television Award for Best Actor) – Michael Gallagher
- Inside I'm Dancing (2004) – Fergus Connolly
- The Constant Gardener (2005) – Sir Kenneth Curtiss
- Middletown (2006, Nominated for a 2007 Irish Film and Television Award for Best Supporting Actor) – Bill Hunter
- The Front Line (2006) – Detective Insp. Harbison
- Tell It to the Fishes (2006, Short) – Jack
- Hesitation (2007, Short) – Paul
- Anton (2008, Nominated for a 2009 Irish Film and Television Award for Best Supporting Actor) – Detective Lynch
- Mr Crocodile in the Cupboard (2008, Short) – Harry Dunn
- Rip & the Preacher (2008) – Preacher
- Wide Open Spaces (2009) – Hingerty
- Swansong: Story of Occi Byrne (2009) – Michael Byrne
- Town Creek (2009) – Mr. Marshall
- Robin Hood (2010) – Baron Fitzrobert
- War Horse (2011) – Market Auctioneer
- Bayonet (2012, Short) – Sean O'Brennan
- In View (2016)
- Lift (2016) – Granddad Eddy
- Penance (2018) – Murray

=== TV roles ===
- Play for Tomorrow (1982) – John Bingham
- The Irish R.M. (1984) – Thomay Foley
- Bergerac (1985) – Doctor
- Lapsed Catholics (1987) – Mal Nevin
- The Rockingham Shoot (1987) – Garda Casey
- Act of Betrayal (1988) – Brendon
- The Investigation: Inside a Terrorist Bombing (1990) – Paddy Mcllkenny
- Shakespeare: The Animated Tales (1994) – Iago
- The Hanging Gale (1995) – Coulter
- The Governor (1995) – Harry Reynolds
- Kidnapped (1995) – Shuan
- Runway One (1995) – Manning
- A Christmassy Ted (1996) – Father Todd Unctious
- Making the Cut (1998)
- Vicious Circle (1999) – Crowley
- Teenage Cics (2006) – Principal Scannel
- Damage (2007) – Defence Counsel
- Striapacha (2008)
- The Tudors (2009) – Robert Aske
- The Savage Eye (2009) – Various
