= Gorilla Repertory Theatre Company =

American Theatre Company

The Gorilla Repertory Theater Company, also known as Gorilla Rep, is an environmental theater company based out of New York City. Best known for its perennial production of A Midsummer Night's Dream, Gorilla Rep brings plays to parks all over New York City. The company was founded in 1989 by artistic director Christopher Carter Sanderson.

Gorilla Rep's repertoire consists primarily of the works of William Shakespeare and other classics, with occasional works by modern playwrights. Most of Gorilla Rep's productions are performed outdoors, in various parks in New York City, with local environmental features worked into the staging of the show. From scene to scene, both actors and audience change location, with the actors running to the next setting and the audience following behind.

== Reviews of plays ==
- Gorilla Rep's Hamlet outdoors, reviewed: Hamlet Outdoors
- Gorilla Rep's Hamlet indoors reviewed: Hamlet Indoors
- Gorilla Rep's Macbeth reviewed: Macbeth
- Gorilla Rep's Alice in Wonderland reviewed: Alice in Wonderland
- Gorilla Rep's Cherry Orchard reviewed: Cherry Orchard
