= Tommy Crilly =

English footballer

Personal information
- Full name: Thomas Crilly
- Date of birth: 20 July 1895
- Place of birth: Stockton-on-Tees, England
- Date of death: 18 January 1960 (aged 64)
- Place of death: Derby, England
- Height: 5 ft 9 in (1.75 m)
- Position: Full back

Senior career*
Years	Team	Apps	(Gls)
?–1919	Stockton		
1919–1922	Hartlepools United	85	(1)
1922–1927	Derby County	197	(0)
1928–1932	Crystal Palace	116	(1)
1933–1934	Northampton Town	46	(1)
1935–1937	Scunthorpe & Lindsey United		
Total		444	(3)

Managerial career
- 1935–1937: Scunthorpe & Lindsey United (player-manager)
- * Club domestic league appearances and goals

Thomas Crilly (20 July 1895 – 18 January 1960) was an English professional footballer who played in The Football League for Hartlepools United, Derby County, Crystal Palace, Northampton Town. He also played for Stockton and Scunthorpe & Lindsey United.

== Playing career ==
Crilly was born in Stockton-on-Tees, England and began his playing career with local team Stockton F.C., before signing for Hartlepools United (then playing in the North Eastern League) in 1919. He was ever present in his first two seasons and missed only one game when Hartlepools were elected to the Third Division North in 1921–22. In 1922, Crilly and teammate Harry Thoms moved, along with manager Cecil Potter, to Derby County. He made over 200 appearances, in total, for Derby and helped the club achieve promotion to the First Division, before moving to Crystal Palace in 1928 (again at the same time as Thoms). He was a regular in the sides that finished Third Division South runners up in 1929 and 1931. In 1933 he moved to Northampton Town, where he became club captain between then and 1935 when he moved to become player-manager of Scunthorpe & Lindsey United.

== Later career ==
Crilly left Scunthorpe in 1937 and became a publican in Derby. He also assisted with coaching Derby County junior players during The Second World War.

Crilly died in Derby on 18 January 1960.
