= Jane Austen's family and ancestry =

Genealogy of English novelist Jane Austen

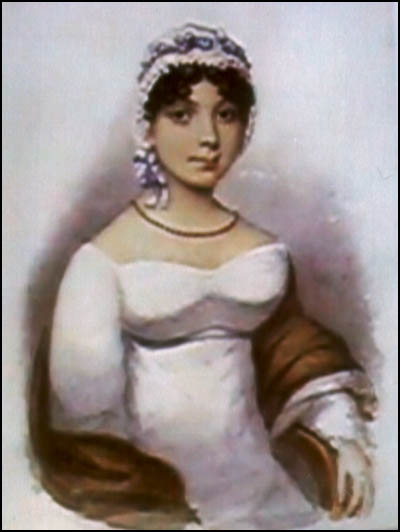
Portrait of Cassandra Austen, Jane's sister and closest friend

Jane Austen's parents, George (1731–1805), an Anglican rector, and his wife Cassandra (1739–1827), were descended from families of the English landed gentry. George was descended from wool manufacturers who had risen to the lower ranks of the gentry, and Cassandra was a member of the Leigh family of Adlestrop and Longborough, with connections to the Barons Leighs of Stoneleigh Abbey in Stoneleigh, Warwickshire. (Note: The Barony of Stoneleigh became extinct in 1786. At the death of the last member of this branch of the family in 1806, Stoneleigh Abbey passed to Cassandra's cousin Thomas. The Barony was eventually revived in 1839 when Cassandra's nephew, Chandos Leigh was created Baron Leigh.) They married on 26 April 1764 at old St Swithins church Walcot in Bath. From 1765 to 1801 (for much of Jane's life), George was a rector of Anglican parishes in Steventon, Hampshire and a nearby village. Irene Collins estimates that when George Austen took up his duties as rector in 1764, Steventon comprised no more than about thirty families. From 1773 to 1796, he supplemented his income by farming and teaching three or four boys at a time (who boarded at his home).

The Austens raised a large family of six boys and two girls:

- James (1765–1819)
- George (1766–1838)
- Edward (1767–1852)
- Henry Thomas (1771–1850)
- Cassandra Elizabeth (1773–1845)
- Francis William (Frank) (1774–1865)
- Jane (1775–1817)
- Charles John (1779–1852)

Jane's sister Cassandra was an artist who, like Jane, did not marry. She was Jane's closest friend and confidante throughout her life.

James (matriculated 1779, BA 1783, MA 1788) and Henry (matriculated 1788, BA 1792, MA 1796) were both educated at St John's College, Oxford, as their father had been. Together they edited a literary magazine, The Loiterer. An accomplished poet, James was ordained as an Anglican clergyman, succeeding his father as rector of Steventon.

Of her brothers, Jane felt closest to Henry, who became a militia officer, then a banker, then (after his banking firm failed) an Anglican clergyman. Henry was also his sister's literary agent. Henry's large circle of friends and acquaintances in London included bankers, merchants, publishers, painters and actors and he provided Jane with a view of social worlds not normally visible from a small parish in rural Hampshire. He married their first cousin (and Jane's close friend), Eliza de Feuillide, who was the daughter of their father's sister, Philadelphia Austen Hancock.

George was sent to live with a local family at a young age because, according to Austen biographer Le Faye, he was "mentally abnormal and subject to fits"; he may also have been deaf and mute.

Charles and Frank served in the navy, both rising to the rank of admiral.

Edward was adopted by his fourth cousin, Thomas Knight, inheriting Knight's estate and taking his name in 1812.

== Family trees ==
Austen, her parents and her siblings
Her siblings, nieces and nephews

Austen's ancestry

8. John Austen IV (1665–1704)
4. William Austen MD (1701–1737)
9. Elizabeth Weller (1675–1721)
2. Rev. George Austen (1731–1805)
10. Sir George Hampson Bart. MD (d. 1724)
5. Rebecca Hampson (1710–1733)
11. Mary Coghill
1. Jane Austen (1775–1817)
12. Theophilus Leigh (1647–1725)
6. Rev. Thomas Leigh D.D. (1696–1764)
13. the Hon. Mary Brydges (1670–1703)
3. Cassandra Leigh (1739–1827)
14. John Walker MD (1675–1726)
7. Jane Walker (1704–1768)
15. Jane Perrot (1675–1709)
