= Karen Ardiff =

Irish actor and writer

- Occupations: Actor; writer

Karen Ardiff is an Irish actor and writer.

== Biography ==
Karen Ardiff was born in Dublin and attended Trinity College, Dublin's Samuel Beckett Centre. She has worked as an actress on stage and television as well as in Evelyn and Brooklyn. She has written, In Skagway, her first play, which was produced by Guna Nua Theatre company and won the Irish Playwrights and Screenwriters Guild Best New Play Award as well as the Stewart Parker/BBC Northern Ireland Award. Her first novel The Secret of my Face came out in 2007.
