= Claudia Carroll =

Actor

- Born: c.Feb 1967; Dublin, Ireland
- Occupations: Writer, Actress
- Writing career
- Pen name: Claudia Carroll
- Genre: Romance Novels

Claudia Carroll (born c. 1969) is an Irish author and actress. She has been a regular on the RTÉ One soap opera Fair City.

== Life and work ==
Born in Dublin where she still lives, Carroll was educated in University College Dublin, the College of Music in Dublin and of the Gaiety School of Acting. She plays the character of Nicola Prendergast on the Irish TV soap Fair City appearing in the role for fourteen years. While she was working Carroll was also writing her first novel in her dressing room. That book was published in 2004. Eventually she left the show in 2007 and focused on her writing although she has made guest appearances of her character.

== Bibliography ==
=== Novels ===
- He Loves Me Not...He Loves Me 2004
- Remind Me Again Why I Need A Man 2005
- The Last Of The Great Romantics 2005
- I Never Fancied Him Anyway 2007
- Do you want to know a secret 2008
- If This is Paradise, I Want My Money Back 2009
- Personally I Blame My Fairy Godmother 2010
- Will You Still Love Me Tomorrow? 2011
- A Very Accidental Love Story 2012
- Me and You 2013
- Love Me or Leave Me 2014
- Meet Me In Manhattan 2015
- All She Ever Wished For 2016

=== Short stories ===
- All I Want For Christmas (with others) 2012
- The Perfect Escape: Romantic short stories to relax with (with other writers) 2013
- Single, Forty and Fabulous!: A Love...Maybe Valentine eShort 2015
- Love...Maybe: The Must-Have Eshort Collection (with others) 2015
- In A New York Minute 2015

=== Others ===
- REMEMBRANCE WRITING 101 The Easy Way to Write and Share the Stories of Your Life, A Guidebook 2011
