= Bogwoman =

- Promotional poster
- Written by: Tom Collins
- Directed by: Tom Collins
- Starring: Rachael Dowling; Peter Mullan; Sean McGinley; Noelle Brown
- Music by: Fiachra Trench
- Country of origin: Ireland
- Original language: English

Production
- Producers: Tom Collins; Martha O'Neill
- Cinematography: Peter Robertson
- Editor: Mary Finlay
- Running time: 84 minutes

Original release
- Release: 13 June 1997

Bogwoman is a 1997 Irish drama film directed by Tom Collins and starring Rachael Dowling, Peter Mullan, Sean McGinley, Noelle Brown. It follows the story of Maureen, a woman born in the boglands of County Donegal who moves across the border to the Bogside to marry a Derry (Northern Ireland) man.

== Etymology of title ==
"Bogwoman" is a play on a term of abuse shouted at a Derry woman by the British Army; The word has been used to describe women that live in the Provisional Irish Republican Army stronghold of the Bogside in Derry.
