= Plays International & Europe =

British theatre magazine

Plays International & Europe is a British online theatre magazine carrying reviews, interviews and features with photographs on theatre in London and the UK as well as internationally, with an emphasis on other European countries and the United States. The online Plays International & Europe succeeds the paper magazine version as of January 2022. It is edited by Jeremy Malies based in the UK.

== History ==
The origins of Plays International & Europe go back to the monthly magazine Plays and Players first published in 1953 as part of the Hansom Books Seven Arts Group of magazines, providing regular reviews of theatrical events in Great Britain. The editor of Plays and Players for many years between 1963 and 1975, Peter Roberts, in 1984 became editor of a magazine modeled on the same format called Plays International, which continued the tradition of publishing theatre reviews alongside photographic illustrations of the shows and actors involved.

In 2016 the magazine, then in its 31st volume, was taken over by the Theater Research Institute of Europe, based in Luxembourg. Its title was amended to Plays International & Europe, retaining the same ISSN number, and it changed from monthly/bi-monthly to quarterly publication. Dr Dana Rufolo, a Luxembourgish-American author and contributor to the magazine, took over the position as editor-in-chief and sought to make the magazine more critical in outlook and politically engaged. She continued to write as a theatre critic for the magazine as well and reported on theatre festivals in Europe, such as the International Meetings of the Theatre in Cluj (Cluj Theatre Festival 2018-2023) or the Festival de Almada in Portugal, for which she obtained the Prémio Carlos Porto-Imprensa Especializada for reporting on the Festival of Almada in October 2019.

In 2022 the magazine was relaunched as a purely digital edition with open access under the same website. Ownership and editorship of the online magazine passed into the hands of Jeremy Malies, a British theatre critic who had written for Plays International since its inception and who lives in the UK. In addition to being a reviewer, Malies had been a desk editor working closely with Rufolo and her team when the magazine was owned by TRIE asbl. Most of the critics already engaged with writing for Plays International & Europe have continued to write for Malies' online magazine. Critics writing reviews for the magazine include academics, authors, and contributors to British and international media. Malies has conducted many interviews with notable directors for the magazine. These include the late Sir Michael Boyd, David Lan, Barrie Rutter, Rupert Goold and Phyllida Lloyd. He covers the Edinburgh Festival Fringe and Edinburgh International Festival every year as well as festivals in Brighton.

== Publications ==
Plays International & Europe is quoted in academic and general theatre anthologies, such as Rewriting the Nation: British Theatre Today by Aleks Sierz, and A Director’s Theatre, by Robert Cohen.

An editorial discussing the consequences of the 2020 pandemic for the theatre world was translated for a Romanian theatre magazine, and the issues raised by the pandemic as reflected in the Autumn 2020 issue of Plays International & Europe were reviewed in a specialized article.

There are numerous references to the antecedent magazine Plays and Players in the books The Best of Plays and Players 1953-1968, and The Best of Plays and Players 1969-1983, both edited by Peter Roberts. It is also referenced in other anthologies, such as Modern British Playwriting: the 60s: Voices, Documents, New Interpretations by Steve Nicholson.
