= Joe Crilly =

Irish playwright

- Born: 1962
- Died: 2017 (aged 54–55); Perpignan, France
- Occupation: Playwright

Joseph Crilly (1962–2017) was an Irish playwright. Hailing from Derrymacash in County Armagh, he lived for more than three decades in London, where he variously worked as an actor, journalist and social worker. He was arts editor of the Irish Post in the 1990s.

He is best known for his trilogy of plays on Ulster: Second-Hand Thunder (1998), its companion piece On McQuillan's Hill (2000) and Kitty & Damnation (2009). The three have been published together as The Crilly Trilogy. On McQuillan's Hill, which was originally staged at the Lyric Theatre, Belfast was revived at the Finborough Theatre in 2020, directed by Jonathan Harden. The production received critical acclaim, including five stars from the Morning Star and four stars from The Stage. The Finborough production was an English premiere, and marked the twentieth anniversary of the play's Belfast debut. Following strong reviews, the four week run sold out.

In May 2017, Crilly killed himself in a hotel room in Perpignan.
