= Mill Theatre Dundrum =

Theatre in Dublin, Ireland

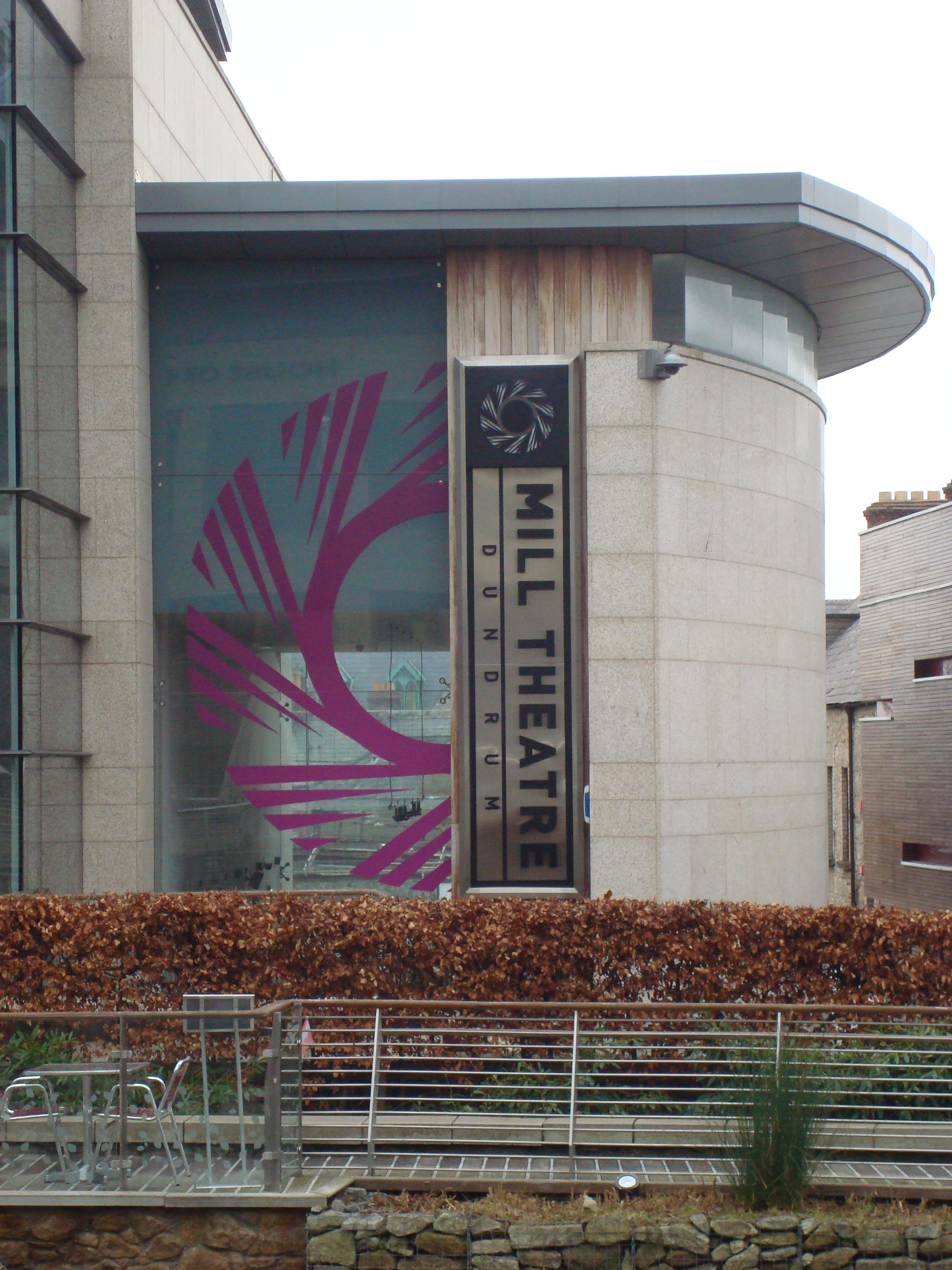
- Mill Theatre Dundrum (Main entrance)

- Location in Dublin Location in Ireland
- Address: Dundrum Town Centre
- Location: Dundrum, Dublin, Ireland
- Coordinates: 53.28844°N 6.24307°W
- Public transit: Luas Green Line: Dundrum stop
- Parking: Green Car Park Dundrum Town Centre

Construction
- Opened: May 2006

Website
- www.milltheatre.ie

Mill Theatre Dundrum, also known as the dlr Mill Theatre, is a theatre in the Dundrum Town Centre shopping centre in Dublin, Ireland. It was opened by Mary McAleese on 4 May 2006.

There are 205 seats in the theatre's main auditorium. The seating can be retracted (via a mechanical system) to provide practice or performance space. The stage is a proscenium arch which is at ground level.

In 2012, the building's studio space was renamed the "Maureen O'Hara Studio", in honour of actress Maureen O'Hara who was born in nearby Ranelagh.

There is also a gallery space used for exhibiting visual arts.
