= Dublin Theatre Festival =

- Begins: September
- Ends: October
- Frequency: Annual
- Location: Dublin
- People: Róise Goan (artistic director & CEO)
- Website: http://dublintheatrefestival.ie/

The Dublin Theatre Festival is Europe's oldest specialised theatre festival. It was founded by theatre impresario Brendan Smith in 1957 and has, with the exception of two years, produced a season of international and Irish theatre each autumn. It is one of a number of key post-World War II events established to foster tolerance and cultural understanding between nations. Over the past five decades, the festival has become a crucial part of Ireland's cultural landscape.

It has played a dual role as a window to world theatre, having presented almost every great theatre artist of the late 20th century, and as a champion of Irish writing on the world stage.

== History ==
The Dublin Theatre Festival was founded by Brendan Smith, who also ran the Olympia Theatre and the Brendan Smith Academy of Acting. In the 1950s, the Irish Tourist Board was interested in helping to finance events on what was termed "shoulder months" of the tourist season – May, June, September and October. Brendan successfully sought a grant and the Festival began operating on 13 May 1957.

The policy was – and remains – to bring the best available international theatre to Dublin and to balance the programme with Irish productions, especially new plays. There was controversy in the very first year when, after some complaints, the Director of Tennessee Williams' The Rose Tattoo at the tiny Pike Theatre was charged with presenting "a lewd entertainment". The run of the play was not interrupted and after a year of legal argument the judge threw out the case.

Seán O'Casey's play The Drums of Father Ned was supposed to go up at the 1958 Dublin Theatre Festival, but the Archbishop of Dublin John Charles McQuaid refused to give his blessing (it has been assumed because works of both James Joyce and O'Casey were in the Festival). After Joyce's play was quietly dropped, there was massive changes required for The Drums of Father Ned, a devious way to get O'Casey to drop. After this, Samuel Beckett withdrew his mime piece in protest.

Since then, the Festival has thrived and is regarded as the oldest established specialist theatre festival in Europe. Unlike Edinburgh, opera, music and dance do not form a major element of the programme. Brendan Smith continued as Director until 1983 when he was succeeded by Lewis Clohessy (1984–89), Tony Ó Dálaigh (1990–99), Fergus Linehan (2000–04) and Don Shipley (2005–06). Loughlin Deegan (2007–2011) ran the festival for five years. The Irish Times' Fintan O'Toole described the 2011 festival as "the most significant in 30 years.". Willie White took over as festival director in September 2011.

In 2020, the festival produced a re-imagined programme, after being forced to cancel most of the performances due to the Irish government's ban on theatre performances to protect against the spread of COVID-19. Theatre companies Dead Centre and Anu Productions created live-streamed work, and for audiences to watch at home, and the Abbey Theatre created an outdoor promenade performance.

== Staff ==
- Róise Goan – Artistic Director and chief executive
- Stephen McManus – Director of Programme & Production
- Dee Patton - General Manager
- Jennifer Aust - Programme Coordinator
- Derval Mellett - Marketing and Development Manager

== Sponsors ==
Ulster Bank became the title sponsor of the festival in 2007 initially as part of a three-year deal, extended to five years, concluding in 2011 with the end of the festival's 54th season. The festival is grant aided by The Arts Council, the Department of Culture, Heritage and the Gaeltacht, Dublin City Council, Fáilte Ireland and Tourism Ireland.
