= Town Hall Theatre (Galway) =

- Amharclann Halla na Cathrach
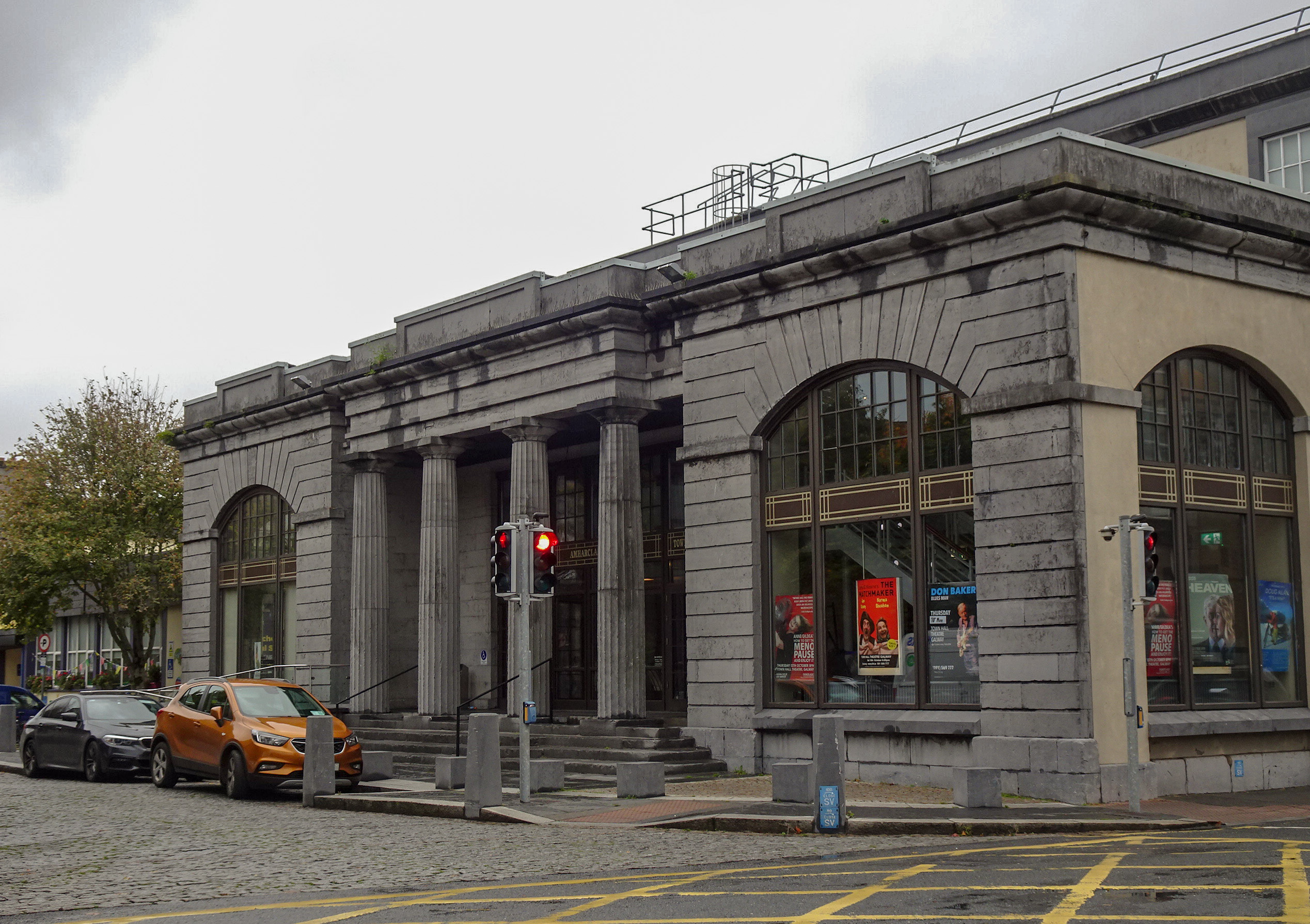
- Town Hall Theatre

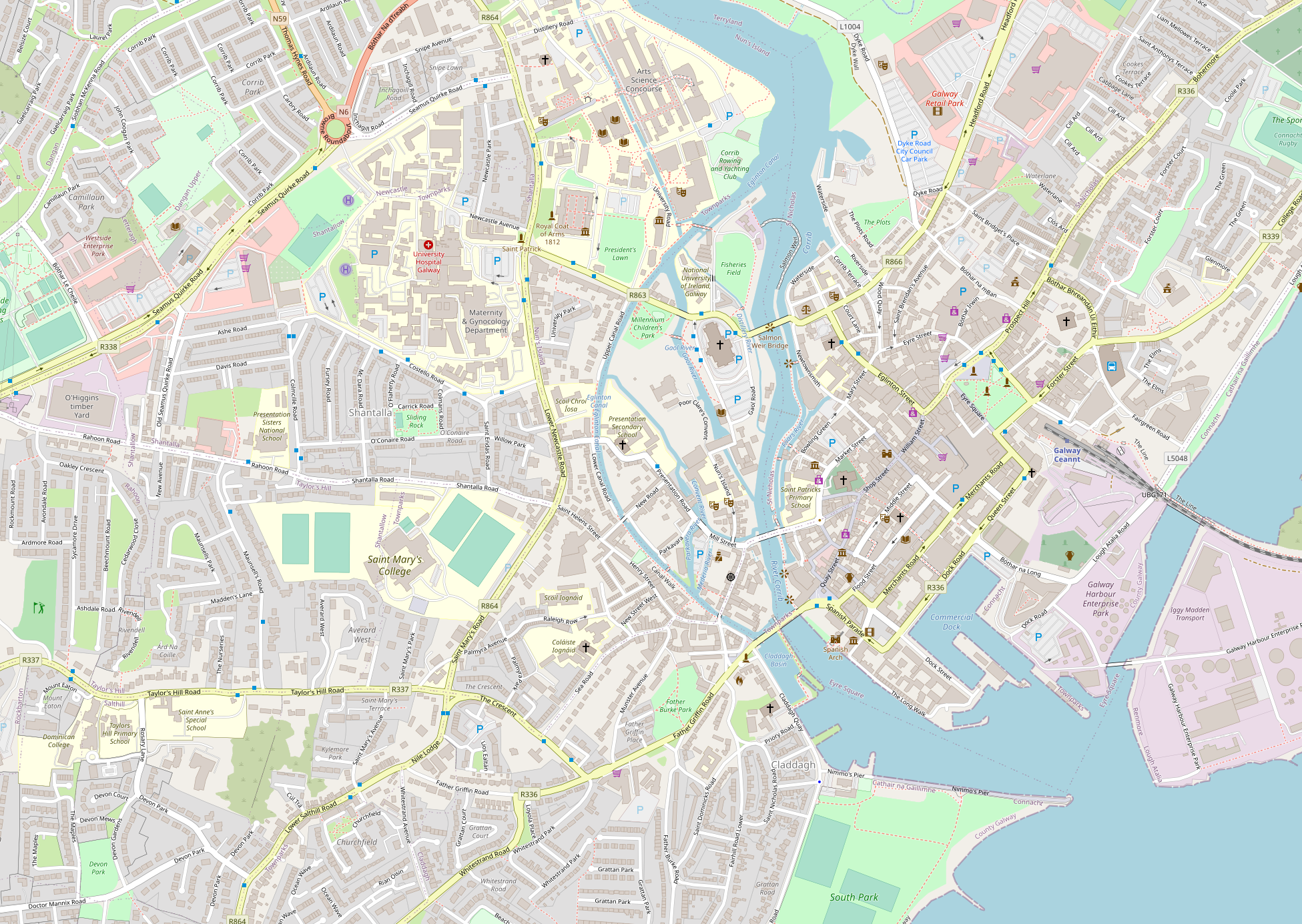
- Location within Galway
- Former names: Galway Town Courthouse; Galway Town Hall

General information
- Type: Theatre
- Architectural style: Neoclassical
- Location: 1 Courthouse Square, Galway, Ireland
- Coordinates: 53.276177°N 9.053985°W
- Construction started: 21st June 1824
- Completed: 1825
- Renovated: 1 February 1996
- Client: Galway Corporation; Department of Arts, Culture and the Gaeltacht

Design and construction
- Architect: Alexander Hay (1824-1825)

Other information
- Seating capacity: 400 (Main auditorium); 52 (Studio space)

Website
- tht.ie

The Town Hall Theatre (Irish: Amharclann Halla na Cathrach) is a theatre in Galway, Ireland. It was commissioned as a courthouse and later accommodated the meeting place and offices of Galway Corporation.

== History ==
The Town Hall Theatre was designed by architect Alexander Hay in the neoclassical style to be the Galway Town Courthouse and was built directly opposite the Galway Courthouse. Construction of the building began on 21 June 1824 and was completed in 1825.

The design involved a symmetrical facade of five bays facing onto Courthouse Square, with the end bays slightly projected forward. The central section of three bays featured a tetrastyle portico formed by Doric order columns supporting an entablature. The end bays were fenestrated by segmental headed windows with voussoirs. The Coat of arms of the United Kingdom was mounted on top of the entablature, but was removed during the Irish War of Independence.

The building was later used as a town hall by the Galway Corporation. The corporation was dissolved under the Municipal Corporations (Ireland) Act 1840, with the town commissioners as its successor. After it was reformed in 1937, Galway Corporation was mostly based at offices in Dominick Street and Fishmarket.

On 18 October 1911, Christabel Pankhurst made an address at a suffragettes meeting held by the Irish Women’s Franchise League. Councillor M.J. Crowley of the Galway Urban Council followed this address by stating that the council would express their support for women's voting rights.

In 1913 the Ard Fheis was held at the Town Hall. This was the first Oireachtas held outside of Dublin. Notable attendees included, Douglas Hyde, Éamon de Valera, Seán T. O’Kelly and Patrick Pearse.

On 29 January 1916 the Lord Lieutenant of Ireland and John Redmond advertised a recruiting conference, known as the "Great Recruiting Conference" in the Tuam Herald and Galway Express newspapers, which was held at the Town Hall on 2 February 1916.

In December 1920, the Town Hall was commandeered by the British Military and was used as a temporary detention camp. The camp held 134 prisoners, according to Geraldine Plunkett Dillon and was guarded by around 40 military personnel. Prisoners were treated poorly, being forced to sleep on the floor with little room. The conditions of this camp resulted in the death of Michael Mullin, a Gaelic footballer for Mountbellew, from influenza on 3 January 1921. Following his death, the authorities moved the prisoners to St Nicholas’ Parochial School, Earl's Island and the Galway Gaol.

In the 1950s, the building was converted into a cinema and was used for film screenings until it fell into disrepair in the 1990s. Galway Corporation, with the assistance of a grant from the Department of Arts, Culture and the Gaeltacht, undertook a major refurbishment of the building between 1993 and 1995 and it reopened as a municipal theatre in October 1995.

The venue has a seating capacity for 400 people in its main auditorium and a capacity for 52 people in a studio space. It attracts audiences in excess of 100,000 annually (close to 2 million since being officially re-opened on 1 February 1996) making it the most successful theatre of its size in Ireland.

It is used as a venue for several festivals annually including Cúirt International Festival of Literature, which is held in April each year, and the Galway International Arts Festival, which is held in July each year.

Charlie Byrne's Bookshop hosts a pop-up bookshop there in April each year during Cúirt.
