= The Troubles in film and television =

List of dramatized works about The Troubles and dissident republican events

Below is an incomplete list of feature films, television films or television series which include events of The Troubles and the Dissident Irish republican campaign. This list does not include documentaries, short films. This list includes films about events from the late 1960s to the present day. For events of the early 20^{th} century, see List of Irish revolutionary period films.

== 1960s ==
Year	Country	Title	Director	Subject
1968	United Kingdom	The Violent Enemy	Don Sharp	Crime, drama, thriller. Based on the novel A candle for the dead.

== 1970s ==
Year	Country	Title	Director	Subject
1974	Canada	A Quiet Day in Belfast	Milad Bessada	Drama. Based on the play A quiet day in Belfast.
1975	United Kingdom; United States	Hennessy	Don Sharp	Action, Drama, Thriller.
1979	United States; Netherlands	The Outsider	Tony Luraschi	Drama, history, thriller. Based on the novel The heritage of Michael Flaherty.

== 1980s ==
Year	Country	Title	Director	Subject
1980	United Kingdom	The Long Good Friday	John Mackenzie	Crime, Drama, Mystery, Thriller.
1981	United Kingdom	Looks and Smiles	Ken Loach	Drama.
1981	Ireland	Traveller	Joe Comerford	Drama.
1981	United Kingdom; Ireland	Maeve	Pat Murphy	Drama.
1982	United Kingdom; Ireland	Angel	Neil Jordan	Drama, Music, Thriller.
1983	United Kingdom	Acceptable Levels	John Davies	Drama.
1983	Belgium; France	The Writing On The Wall (Nous étions tous des noms d'arbres)	Armand Gatti	Drama.
1984	United Kingdom; Ireland	Cal	Pat O'Connor	Drama, thriller, romance. Based on the novel Cal.
1985	United Kingdom	No Surrender	Peter Smith	Comedy.
1987	United Kingdom	Boy Soldier (Milwr Bychan)	Karl Francis	Drama.
1987	United Kingdom	A Prayer for the Dying	Mike Hodges	Action, crime, drama, thriller. Based on the novel A prayer for the dying.
1988	United Kingdom; United States	For Queen and Country	Martin Stellman	Action, Crime, Drama, Thriller.
1989	United Kingdom; United States	Elephant	Alan Clarke	Drama.

== 1990s ==
Year	Country	Title	Director	Subject
1990	United Kingdom	Hidden Agenda	Ken Loach	Drama, Thriller.
1992	United Kingdom	The Railway Station Man	Michael Whyte	Drama, romance. Based on the novel The railway station man.
1992	United States	Patriot Games	Phillip Noyce	Action, thriller. Based on the novel Patriot games.
1992	United Kingdom; Japan	The Crying Game	Neil Jordan	Crime, drama, romance, thriller. Based on the short story "Guests of the nation".
1993	United Kingdom	Fatal Inheritance	Gabrielle Beaumont	Action, Drama, Thriller.
1993	Ireland	High Boot Benny	Joe Comerford	Drama.
1993	Ireland; United States	In the Name of the Father	Jim Sheridan	Biography, crime, drama. Based on the autobiography Proved innocent: The story of Gerry Conlon of the Guildford Four. Guildford pub bombings, Guildford Four and Maguire Seven
1994	United States	Patriots	Frank Kerr	Thriller.
1994	United States	Blown Away	Stephen Hopkins	Action, Crime, Drama, Thriller.
1995	United Kingdom; Ireland	Nothing Personal	Thaddeus O'Sullivan	Drama.
1996	Lebanon; Germany; Ireland	Warshots (Kriegsbilder)	Heiner Stadler	Drama.
1996	Ireland; United States	Some Mother's Son	Terry George	Drama, history. 1981 Irish hunger strike
1997	Ireland	This Is the Sea	Mary McGuckian	Drama, Romance.
1997	United Kingdom	The Eliminator	Enda Hughes	Action, Comedy.
1997	United States	The Devil's Own	Alan J. Pakula	Action, Crime, Drama, Thriller.
1997	United Kingdom; Spain; Germany; Ireland; Japan	A Further Gesture	Robert Dornhelm	Drama, Romance, Thriller.
1997	Ireland; United States	The Boxer	Jim Sheridan	Drama, Romance, Sport.
1997	United States	My Brother's War	James Brolin	Action, Thriller.
1998	United Kingdom	Crossmaheart	Henry Herbert	Drama. Based on the novel Cycle of violence.
1998	United States; United Kingdom	Ronin	John Frankenheimer	Action, Crime, Thriller.
1998	United Kingdom; Ireland	The General	John Boorman	Biography, crime, drama, thriller. Based on the book The general. Martin Cahill
1998	United Kingdom	Divorcing Jack	David Caffrey	Thriller, comedy. Based on the novel Divorcing Jack.
1998	United Kingdom	Titanic Town	Roger Michell	Drama.
1998	United Kingdom	Resurrection Man	Marc Evans	Crime, drama, thriller. Based on the novel Resurrection man. Shankill Butchers
1999	Ireland	Sunset Heights	Colm Villa	Action, Thriller.
1999	United Kingdom; United States	Shergar	Dennis Lewiston	Crime, drama, romance, sport. Shergar

== 2000s ==
Year	Country	Title	Director	Subject
2000	Ireland; United States	Moving Target	Paul Ziller	Action.
2000	United States	An Everlasting Piece	Barry Levinson	Comedy.
2001	United Kingdom; Ireland	Mapmaker	Johnny Gogan	Thriller.
2001	Ireland	Silent Grace	Maeve Murphy	Drama. Based on the plays The Armagh women, Now and at the hour of our death. Dirty protest
2001	Ireland	H3	Les Blair	Drama. 1981 Irish hunger strike
2002	United Kingdom; Ireland	Boxed	Marion Comer	Drama.
2004	United Kingdom; France; Ireland	Mickybo and Me	Terry Loane	Comedy, drama. Based on the play Mojo Mickybo.
2005	Italy	The Silence of the Skylark (Il silenzio dell'allodola)	David Ballerini	Drama.
2005	Ireland; United Kingdom	The Mighty Celt	Pearse Elliot	Drama.
2005	Ireland; United Kingdom	Breakfast on Pluto	Neil Jordan	Comedy, drama. Based on the novel Breakfast on Pluto.
2006	United States; Ireland	I.R.A.: King of Nothing	Damian Chapa	Action, Drama.
2006	United Kingdom; Ireland	Johnny Was	Mark Hammond	Action, Crime, Drama, Thriller.
2007	United Kingdom; Canada; United States	Closing the Ring	Richard Attenborough	Drama, Romance.
2008	Ireland	Anton	Graham Cantwell	Action, Crime, Drama, History, Romance, Thriller.
2008	Ireland	Peacefire	Macdara Vallely	Drama.
2008	United Kingdom; Ireland	Hunger	Steve McQueen	Biography, crime, drama, thriller. 1981 Irish hunger strike
2008	United Kingdom; Canada	Fifty Dead Men Walking	Kari Skogland	Crime, drama, thriller. Based on Martin McGartland's autobiography.
2009	United States	Disappearing in America	Erik Rodgers	Drama.
2009	United Kingdom; Ireland	Five Minutes of Heaven	Oliver Hirschbiegel	Drama, Thriller.

== 2010s ==
Year	Country	Title	Director	Subject
2012	United Kingdom; Ireland	Shadow Dancer	James Marsh	Drama, mystery, thriller. Based on the novel Shadow dancer.
2013	United Kingdom; Ireland	Good Vibrations	Lisa Barros D'Sa; Glenn Leyburn	Biography, Drama, Music.
2013	United Kingdom	The Best Years	Danny Patrick	Comedy, Crime, Drama, Romance.
2013	Ireland	A Belfast Story	Nathan Todd	Crime, Drama.
2014	United Kingdom	Shooting for Socrates	James Erskine	Comedy, drama, sport. 1986 FIFA World Cup
2014	United Kingdom	'71	Yann Demange	Action, Crime, Drama, Thriller, War.
2016	United Kingdom	The Truth Commissioner	Declan Recks	Crime, Drama, Thriller.
2016	United Kingdom	The Journey	Nick Hamm	Biography, drama, history. Ian Paisley, Martin McGuinness, St. Andrews Agreement.
2017	United Kingdom; China; United States; India	The Foreigner	Martin Campbell	Action, thriller. Based on the novel The Chinaman.
2017	United Kingdom; Ireland; Sweden; Germany	Maze	Stephen Burke	Biography, crime, drama, history, mystery, thriller. Maze prison escape
2018	Ireland; United Kingdom	Penance (Aithrí)	Tommy Collins	Action, romance. Based on the story Seacht mBua an Éirí Amach.
2019	United Kingdom	Cyprus Avenue	Rhodri Huw; Vicky Featherstone	Comedy, Drama, Thriller.

== 2020s ==
Year	Country	Title	Director	Subject
2020	United Kingdom; Ireland	Wildfire	Cathy Brady	Drama.
2021	Ireland	A Bend in the River	Colin Broderick	Drama.
2021	United Kingdom	Belfast	Kenneth Branagh	Biography, drama, romance. 1969 Northern Ireland riots
2022	Ireland	The Troubles: A Dublin Story	Luke Hanlon	Crime, Drama.
2023	United Kingdom	Dead Shot	Tom Guard; Charles Guard	Action, thriller. Based on the book The road to Balcombe Street.
2023	Ireland; United Kingdom	Baltimore	Joe Lawlor; Christine Molloy	Thriller. Rose Dugdale
2023	Ireland	In the Land of Saints and Sinners	Robert Lorenz	Action, Crime, Thriller.
2024	Ireland; United Kingdom	Kneecap	Rich Peppiatt	Comedy, drama. Kneecap
2025	United Kingdom; United States	Anemone	Ronan Day-Lewis	Drama.

== Science fiction, fantasy and horror films ==
Year	Country	Title	Director	Subject
1975	Italy	Mondo candido	Gualtiero Jacopetti; Franco E. Prosperi	Adventure, comedy, fantasy. Based on the novel Candide.
1976	France; Italy; West Germany; Canada	Born for Hell (Die Hinrichtung)	Denis Héroux	Drama, horror, thriller. Richard Speck

== Television films ==
Year	Country	Title	Director	Subject
1972	United States; United Kingdom	A War of Children	George Schaefer	Drama.
1980	United Kingdom	Murphy's Stroke	Frank Cvitanovich	Drama.
1980	United Kingdom	The Long March	Chris Parr	Drama.
1981	United Kingdom	Nailed	June Howson	
1982	United Kingdom	Giro City	Karl Francis	Drama, Thriller.
1983	United Kingdom	Across the Water	Paul Seed	Drama.
1984	United Kingdom	Killer Waiting	Michael Ferguson	Thriller.
1984	United States; Ireland	Children in the Crossfire	George Schaefer	Drama.
1984	United Kingdom	Four Days in July	Mike Leigh	Drama.
1985	United Kingdom	We'll Support You Evermore	Douglas Livingstone	Drama.
1986	Canada	In This Corner	Atom Egoyan	Drama.
1987	United Kingdom	Rat in the Skull	Glyn Edwards; Max Stafford-Clark	Drama.
1988	New Zealand	The Grasscutter	Ian Mune	Crime.
1989	Ireland; United Kingdom	Hush-a-Bye Baby	Margo Harkin	Romance.
1990	Ireland	Dear Sarah	Frank Cvitanovich	Drama. Guildford Four and Maguire Seven
1992	United Kingdom	You, Me and Marley	Richard Spence	Drama.
1995	Canada; United Kingdom	Beyond Reason	Jim O'Brien	Drama.
1997	Ireland	Bogwoman	Tommy Collins	Drama.
1997	Ireland; United States	The Informant	Jim McBride	Drama. Based on the book Field of blood.
1997	United Kingdom	The Investigator	Chris Oxley	Biography, Drama.
1999	United Kingdom	Vicious Circle	David Blair	Crime, drama. Based on the book The general. Martin Cahill
2002	United Kingdom	As the Beast Sleeps	Harry Bradbeer	Drama. Ulster Defence Association
2002	United Kingdom; Ireland	Sunday	Charles McDougall	Drama. Bloody Sunday
2002	United Kingdom; Ireland; United States	Bloody Sunday	Paul Greengrass	Drama, history, war. Based on the book Eyewitness Bloody Sunday. Ivan Cooper, Bloody Sunday
2002	Canada	The Pilot's Wife	Robert Markowitz	Drama. Based on the novel The pilot's wife.
2003	United Kingdom; Ireland	Holy Cross	Mark Brozel	Drama. Holy Cross dispute
2003	United Kingdom; Ireland	You Looking at Me?	Margo Harkin	Drama.
2004	United Kingdom; Ireland	Omagh	Pete Travis	Drama. Omagh bombing
2006	United Kingdom	Cracker	Antonia Bird	Crime, Drama.
2018	United Kingdom	Mother's Day	Fergus O'Brien	Drama. Warrington bombings

== Television series ==
Year	Country	Title	Director	Subject
1982	United Kingdom	Harry's Game	Lawrence Gordon Clark	Thriller. Based on the novel Harry's game.
1985	United Kingdom	Confessional	Gordon Flemyng	Thriller. Based on the novel Confessional.
1985	United Kingdom; Ireland	The Price	Peter Smith	Drama, Thriller.
1988	United Kingdom	Crossfire	Ken Hannam	Thriller.
1988	Ireland; Australia	Act of Betrayal	Lawrence Gordon Clark	Drama, Thriller.
1989–90	United Kingdom	Frederick Forsyth Presents	Tom Clegg; Lawrence Gordon Clark; Ian Sharp; James Cellan Jones	Action, thriller. Based on the novel The deceiver.
1991	United Kingdom	Children of the North	David Drury	Thriller. Based on the novels: The killing of yesterday's children, Lonely, the man without heroes and A darkness in the eye.
1992	United Kingdom	Civvies	Karl Francis	Drama.
1993–96	United Kingdom	Circles of Deceit	Geoffrey Sax; Nicholas Laughland; Alan Grint; Peter Barber-Fleming	
1995, 1998–2007, 2016–present	United Kingdom; Ireland	Give My Head Peace		Comedy.
1999	United Kingdom	Eureka Street	Adrian Shergold	Drama, comedy. Based on the novel Eureka Street. Northern Ireland peace process
2001	United Kingdom	The Bombmaker	Graham Theakston	Action. Based on the novel The bombmaker.
2005	United Kingdom	The Rotters' Club	Tony Dean Smith	Drama. Based on the novel The Rotters' Club.
2012	United Kingdom	White Heat	John Alexander	Drama.
2014	United Kingdom	From There to Here	James Strong	Drama. 1996 Manchester bombing
2018–22	United Kingdom	Derry Girls	Michael Lennox	Comedy.
2022	Netherlands	The Spectacular	Pieter Kuijpers; Willem Bosch	Crime, drama, thriller. Donna Maguire
2024	United States; Ireland	Say Nothing	Joshua Zetumer	Drama, history, thriller. Based on the novel Say nothing: A true story of murder and memory in Northern Ireland.
2024	United States; United Kingdom	This Town	Paul Whittington	Drama.
2025	United Kingdom	Trespasses	Dawn Shadforth	Based on the novel Trespasses.

== See also ==
- List of films featuring the Irish Republican Army
- Cinema of Northern Ireland
