= Waldo Peirce =

American painter (1884–1979)

- Peirce (left) with his brother and their wives, 1930s
- Born: December 17, 1884; Bangor, Maine, U.S.
- Died: March 8, 1970 (aged 85); Newburyport, Massachusetts, U.S.
- Known for: Painting
- Spouse(s): Dorothy Rice; Ivy Troutman; Alzira Boehm; Ellen Antoinette Larson

The Silver Slipper dance hall adjacent to Sloppy Joe's in Key West, painted in the 1930s

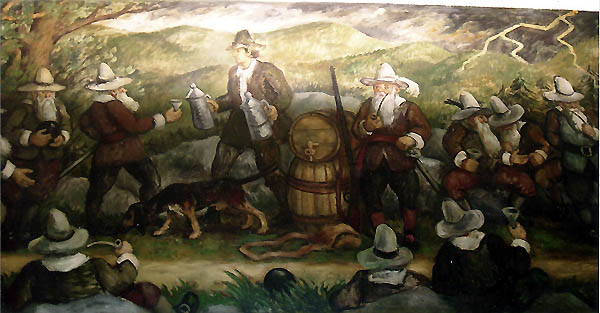
"Legends of the Hudson", section of a fine arts mural painted by Waldo Peirce in 1938 for the Troy, New York, post office

Waldo Peirce (December 17, 1884 – March 8, 1970) was an American painter, who for many years reveled in living the life of a bohemian expatriate.

Peirce was both a prominent painter and a well-known colorful figure in the world of the arts. In a modern account, he was described as Rabelaisian, bawdy, witty, robust, wild, lusty, protean, lecherous, luscious, and was sometimes called "the American Renoir." Peirce once said he never worked a day in his life. He did, however, spend many hours every day for 50 years of his life painting still lifes, figures, and landscapes as well as hundreds of pictures of his beloved families (he was married four times and had numerous children). With a mustache and full beard and a large cigar jammed perpetually into his mouth he looked every inch of a cartoonist's notion of an artist. Peirce himself was adamant about one thing: "I'm a painter," he insisted, "not an artist."

== Biography ==
Waldo Peirce was born December 17, 1884, in Bangor, Maine, to Mellen Chamberlain Peirce and Anna Hayford. His father was a Bangor lumber baron. Peirce had three siblings, an older brother and a younger sister and brother. He attended Phillips Academy in Andover, Massachusetts, and graduated in 1903. He then attended Harvard University and, by his own account, barely graduated due to copious amounts of time spent in the local pool hall and other trivial pursuits. Although Peirce always identified with the Class of 1907, the exact year of his graduation is not clear, and he may have received his diploma in either 1908 or 1909. Peirce was a large man for his time, and he was drafted onto the Harvard football team, solely, he said, because of his size. He played the center position. After Harvard, Peirce studied art at the Art Students League in New York City, and later, traveled to Europe where he studied at both the Académie Julian in Paris and with the Spanish artist Ignacio Zuloaga. He initially focused on Impressionism.

In 1915, two years before the entry of the United States into World War I, he joined the American Field Service, an ambulance corps that served on the French battlefields. He was later decorated with the Croix de Guerre by the French government for bravery at Verdun. For 10 years, between 1910 and 1920, Peirce lived the expatriate life in France and Paris, before returning to the United States for a couple of years. He then returned to Europe for several more years, and only returned to the U.S. permanently with the advent of World War II.

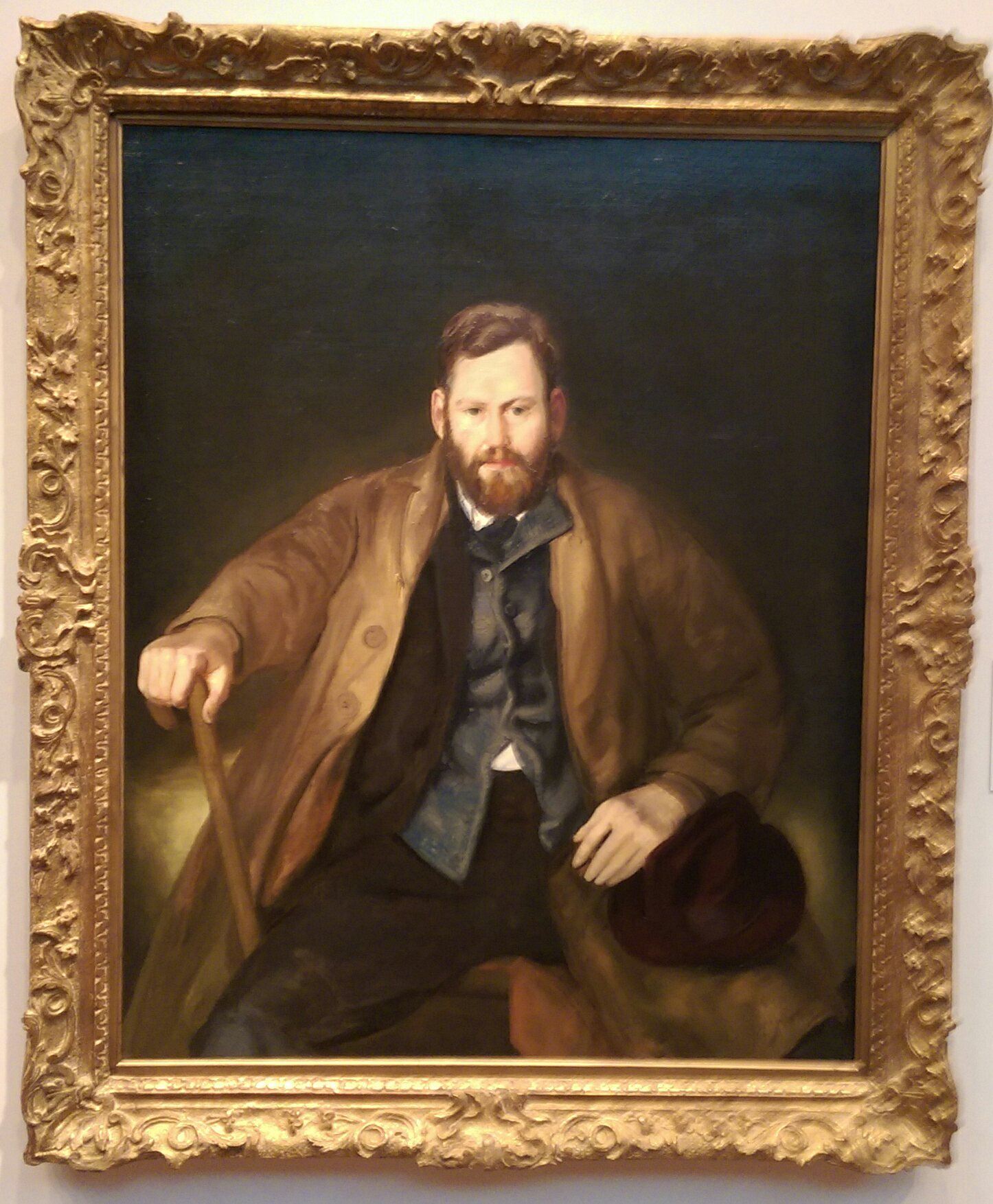
Portrait painting of Peirce by George Bellows, 1920, on display at the de Young Museum in San Francisco

In 1938, he was commissioned by the Treasury Section of Fine Arts to paint two murals, Legends of the Hudson and Rip van Winkle, for the U.S. Post Office in Troy, New York.

In 1960 Lehigh University exhibited his paintings along with ceramics by Raymond Gallucci and paintings by Charles Ward in an exhibition curated by Francis Quirk.

=== John Reed prank ===
In 1910, Peirce enjoyed a bit of local notoriety when his prank on friend John Reed, the American communist who is buried in the Kremlin walls, became known and circulated. The duo had booked passage on a cattle freighter from Boston to England, but as the ship was leaving Boston Harbor, Peirce apparently decided that the accommodations were not to his taste. Without a word to anyone, he jumped off the back of the ship and swam several miles back to shore. Reed was then arrested by the ship's captain for his alleged involvement in the disappearance of his traveling companion and thrown into the brig. When the freighter eventually arrived in England, Peirce was at the dock waiting to greet his friend Reed. After his swim back to shore, or, by another account, being picked up by a lobster boat, he had then taken a faster ship to England. In later accounts, Peirce's John Reed story seemed to evolve and shift, to the extent its veracity may never be truly known. One further embellishment to the story is that Peirce had swum in a multi-mile swimming contest at Harvard a few days prior.

=== Friendship with Ernest Hemingway ===
Peirce was a longtime friend of Ernest Hemingway. After WWI had come to an end, Peirce befriended Hemingway in Europe and the two traveled together to various continental locations, in particular Spain. In 1937, a painted portrait of Hemingway by Peirce appeared on the cover of the October 18th issue of Time magazine. Peirce was once called "the Ernest Hemingway of American painters." To that he replied, "They'll never call Ernest Hemingway the Waldo Peirce of American writers." His friendship with Hemingway ended only with Hemingway's death in 1961.

== Personal life ==
Peirce was married four times and had five children.

His first marriage was to Dorothy Rice, an artist, aviator, and the first woman to receive a U.S. motorcycle license. Her father was Isaac Rice, a New York lawyer, professor of law, and the founding publisher of Forum Magazine. Dorothy studied sculpture and painting in the Art Students League, with instruction from Robert Henri, William Merritt Chase, John Sloan, and George Bellows. She met Peirce through a mutual friend, George Biddle, and wrote in her 1938 autobiography, Curiouser and Curiouser, "I inquired Waldo's height—he was six feet two. This seemed a dignified height. I told George to produce Waldo, which he did. We got married in Madrid, in a German Methodist Church, with the American vice-consul, who was a Filipino, to make it legal." Rice filed for divorce in 1917. She remarried and would go on to become a world-class bridge player with husband Hal Sims. Aside from being an artist, Dorothy Rice was a writer and published the mystery novel Fog, with Valentine Williams. She died in 1960 [in Cairo] while still working as an international political news correspondent.

Ivy Troutman (1884–1979) was an actress who appeared "in at least 21 Broadway productions between 1902 and 1945," according to Wikipedia, many of them long-running hits, one of them, The Late George Apley, a satire on Boston high society co-written by George S. Kaufman and John P. Marquand, running through 384 shows. The two were married in 1920 and moved to Paris. According to her former paperboy, Jim Forest, Ivy became close friends with writer James Joyce during her time in Paris. "Perhaps the greatest treasure in her treasure-filled house was a copy of the first edition of Joyce's Ulysses..."

Alzira Handforth Boehm was the granddaughter of Vienna-born August Abraham Boehm, the high-flying developer who built an 11-story skyscraper in the Manhattan Diamond District that was one of the first in the world. Known as 14 Maiden Lane or The Diamond Exchange, it still stands. She studied at the Art Students League in Manhattan and later studied in Paris. Dr. William Gallagher of Bangor, an expert on Waldo Peirce, writes in the Harvard Review that Alzira met Waldo "at a Matisse show in New York." In Paris she delivered the couple's twin boys, Michael and Mellen. They then had a daughter, Anna. Mellen Chamberlain Peirce is an active poet and playwright who lives in London. His wife is Gareth Peirce, the human rights activist attorney for the Birmingham Six and Gerry Conlon and the Guildford Four. Emma Thompson was nominated for an Oscar playing Gareth in the 1993 movie In The Name of the Father, with Daniel Day-Lewis also nominated for his role as Conlon.

In 1938, both Alzira and Waldo joined the Works Progress Administration as a husband-and-wife team. Ellsworth's City Hall is graced by an Alzira mural, Ellsworth, Lumber Port. During World War II, Alzira was an Army captain in the American Red Cross Motor Corps. When the war was over, she and Waldo divorced. She then moved to New Mexico and worked as an organizer for the United Mine Workers.

Alzira's talent, drive, and the children she had with Waldo deeply influenced his art. When Waldo was painting Hemingway in Key West, or sailors dancing at Sloppy Joe's, Alzira was painting, too, literally and figuratively, at his side. She was painting across generations.

Ellen Antoinette Larsen was Waldo's fourth wife, and they remained married for 24 years until his death. "I spoke with my Aunt Karin," Will Peirce, Waldo's grandson, writes. "Her mother was Ellen Larsen, born in Minneapolis in 1920, passed away in 2001. She studied art in New York—she painted. A friend of Ellen's used to model for Waldo, and she and Waldo went to a well-known cafe or restaurant where Ellen waited tables. It was during wartime. The romance started there. She preferred the quiet life in Maine, but she kept a pied-à-terre in Manhattan. After they got married, she modeled for Waldo, as did his kids. There was no escaping that job in our family! Her painting style resembled Waldo's sometimes. Sometimes it was quite different."

Peirce was devoted to his children and painted them many hundreds of times. In a letter written in the mid-1930s, Ernest Hemingway described a visit by Peirce to his home in Key West, Florida: "Waldo is here with his kids like untrained hyenas and him as domesticated as a cow. Lives only for the children and with the time he puts on them they should have good manners and be well trained but instead they never obey, destroy everything, don't even answer when spoken to, and he is like an old hen with a litter of ape hyenas. I doubt if he will go out in the boat while he is here. Can't leave the children. They have a nurse and a housekeeper too, but he is only really happy when trying to paint with one setting fire to his beard and the other rubbing mashed potato into his canvasses. That represents fatherhood."

Peirce's older brother, Hayford, was a noted authority on Byzantine art and his third wife, Alzira Peirce (1908–2010), also enjoyed a modest reputation as a painter. His nephew, Hayford Peirce (1942–2020), was a science-fiction and mystery writer. Prominent British solicitor Gareth Peirce married his son Bill.

== Death and legacy ==
A resident of Searsport, Maine, Peirce died on March 8, 1970, in Newburyport, Massachusetts, of a cerebral thrombosis. He was 85 years old. He was survived by his fourth wife, Ellen Antoinette Larsen, and his three sons and two daughters. He is interred in Mount Hope Cemetery, Bangor, Penobscot County, Maine.

Peirce's paintings have been acquired and exhibited by several prominent museums, including the Metropolitan Museum of Art, the Whitney Museum, the Pennsylvania Academy of Fine Arts, and the Brooklyn Museum, among others.

== See also ==
- List of ambulance drivers during World War I
