= List of United States post office murals of Maine =

Following is a list of United States post office murals created in Maine between 1934 and 1943.

Location	Mural title	Image	Artist	Date	Notes	NRHP listed
Dexter	News from the Woodsman		Elliot Means	1941		
Dover-Foxcroft	River Driving		Barrie Barnstow Greenbie	1940	Winner of the 48-State Mural Competition	
Ellsworth	Ellsworth, Lumber Port		Alzira Peirce	1938	on display at the Ellsworth City Hall	
Kennebunk	The Arrival of the First Letter – Kennebunk Post Office from Falmouth – June 14, 1775		Edith Barry	1939	former post office now houses the Kennebunkport Police Station	
Kennebunkport	Bathers		Elizabeth Tracy	1941	removed May 1945	
Kennebunkport	Kennebunkport		Gordon Grant	1944	extant; replaced the Tracy mural	
Millinocket	Logging in the Maine Woods		John Beauchamp	1942		
Portland	The Sea		Henry Mattson	1937		
Portland	The Rocky Coast of Maine		Henry Mattson	1937		
South Portland	Shipwreck at Night		Alzira Peirce	1939		
Westbrook	Woodmen in the Woods of Maine		Waldo Peirce	1937	on display at Portland Museum of Art	
