= Tom McGurk =

Irish journalist

- Born: Tom McGurk; 20 December 1946 (age 79) Cookstown, County Tyrone, Northern Ireland
- University: Queen's University Belfast
- Occupation: Journalist

Rugby union career
Amateur team(s)
Years	Team	Apps	(Points)
- Old Belvedere

Tom McGurk (Irish: Tomás Mag Oirc) (born 20 December 1946) is an Irish poet, journalist, radio presenter and sportscaster from Brockagh, County Tyrone, Northern Ireland. He attended Portadown College. He studied English and Philosophy at Queen's University Belfast. He was involved in the civil rights demonstrations while at Queen's.

== Career ==
=== TV and radio ===
McGurk first joined RTÉ in 1972, as a news reporter, moving on to present Last House and First House on television. In 1972 he won a Jacob's Award for his RTÉ Radio documentaries on Ireland's islands. For 20 years was the presenter of RTÉ Sport's rugby coverage, most notably of the Six Nations and Internationals with the panel of George Hook and Brent Pope. McGurk also spent time in the 1980s and 1990s in the UK, working for BBC Radio 4's Start the Week and as a presenter on the regional ITV station for the North West of England, Granada Television. On his return to Ireland he presented the Sunday Show on RTE Radio 1. He has also guest presented Tonight with Vincent Browne, on TV3. He presented a drive-time radio show on 4FM when it launched in 2009.

=== Writing ===
Until 2019, he was a columnist with The Sunday Business Post. He then wrote for The Currency until 2020.

McGurk wrote the script for the TV film Dear Sarah based on the letters from Sarah Conlon, campaigning for the release of her husband (Giuseppe Conlon), son (Gerry Conlon) and sister Anne Maguire, who were caught up in the Guildford Four miscarriage of justice.

Among his poems is "Big Ned" about a farmer from Brockagh, County Tyrone.

== Personal life ==
While working for 4FM, the Director of the National Women's Council, Susan McKay, spoke out against an "uncouth and objectionable" interview McGurk conducted with her. The National Women's Council has since refrained from giving interviews to 4FM.

From 1983 to 1996 he was married to the broadcaster Miriam O'Callaghan, with whom he has four daughters. In 2003 he married PR consultant Caroline Kennedy.

On 5 December 2017, the Irish Revenue Commissioners's list of tax defaulters revealed that McGurk had made a settlement of €76,000 with the Revenue for the underpayment of income tax.
