= Alzira Peirce =

American painter

- Born: Alzira Handforth Boehm; January 31, 1908; New York City, New York
- Died: June 19, 2010 (aged 102); Brighton, Boston, Massachusetts
- Occupations: Painting, sculpture
- Spouse(s): Waldo Peirce (divorced); Charles Albaugh (divorced)
- Children: 4

Alzira Handforth Peirce Albaugh (née Boehm; January 31, 1908 – June 19, 2010) was an American artist.

== Early life ==
She and her siblings moved to Circle, Montana, to live as homesteaders after their father, August Abraham Boehm, died. Their mother, Hazel Hunter Handforth (September 12, 1883, Huntsville, Missouri - c. 1957, Central Islip, New York) was a suffragette, a homesteader, and later, a restaurateur in New York's Greenwich Village in the 1920s.

Her father, August Abraham Boehm (born 1880, Vienna, Austria-Hungary – died 1916), was an Austrian-born New York City real estate developer of Jewish descent. August Boehm had graduated from Columbia University in 1901 but was affected by the panic of 1907 in which his own father, Abraham Boehm (1841, Germany - 1912, New York), a German-born Jewish New York City real estate developer, lost most of his fortune. Boehm & Coon (est. 1882) had commissioned one of New York's first skyscrapers, the 11-story Diamond Exchange Building (1893–94), as well as The Langham, a prestigious Manhattan apartment building. The elder Boehm partnered with Sir Hiram Stevens Maxim in introducing gas engines to Europe.

Growing up in McCone County, Montana, Alzira played the harmonica, drew, and rode horses. When she was 13 she returned to New York and sought employment through one of her paternal uncles, an architect. In New York she studied at the Art Students League and later traveled to Paris to study. She painted, sculpted, and drew many works of art. Her poetry was published in The New Yorker.

== Career ==
She taught art to sailors on leave at the International Seamen's Union. One of her students was the cartoonist Gahan Wilson. Her art exhibitions were cited in "Who was Who in American Art" page 477 Biographies of American Artists Active from 1898 to 1947, by Sound View Press 1985.

She worked for the Red Cross during World War II for nearly two years. She was captain of the American Red Cross Motor Corps and was the chief of motor corps training of the Rockland County Civilian Protection Group. She worked organizing units of the driving Corps, training them, and supervising their operations.

She rose from officer to captain and conducted the training unit for O.C.D. Drivers training. She was assigned to a district of the park system which included a section of the Palisades Interstate Park Police, Fourth Precinct, Second District Rockland Lake, New York, June 7, 1942. Alzira Peirce was also cited by the municipality of Haverstraw, Rockland County, New York, on September 26, 1942, for her work with the motor corps.

She was commissioned by the Treasury Section of Fine Art, a New Deal agency, to paint two murals. In 1938 she completed Ellsworth, Lumber Port in Ellsworth, Maine, and in 1939 Shipwreck at Night in South Portland, Maine.

An avid artist, she created many sculptures, paintings, and drawings. She moved to New Mexico and worked as an organizer for the United Mine Workers union.

== Personal life ==
After leaving the Army, Waldo and Alzira Peirce divorced. Waldo was 24 years her senior; she had become Peirce's third wife in 1930; the couple had three children, Mellen Chamberlain "Bill" Peirce, Michael Peirce, and Anna Peirce. Bill Peirce became an active poet and playwright living in London, married to Gareth Peirce, the human rights activist attorney for the Birmingham Six and Gerry Conlon and the Guildford Four.

Alzira remarried to Chuck Albaugh and had her fourth child, Kathleen Swoboda.

Alzira Peirce Albaugh died in 2010, aged 102, from sepsis in Brighton, Massachusetts. She was survived by her two sons, her younger daughter, Kathleen, and nine grandchildren.

== Affiliations ==
- Union member of the typesetters union
- National Society of Mural Painters
- Federation of Modern Painters and Sculptors
