= Cvitanovich =

Cvitanovich is a surname. Notable people with the surname include:

- Frank Cvitanovich (1927–1995), Canadian documentary film maker
- John Cvitanovich (1930–2002), Canadian football player
