= Dear Sarah (film) =

- Written by: Tom McGurk
- Directed by: Frank Cvitanovich
- Starring: Stella McCusker; Barry McGovern; Paddy Rocks
- Country of origin: Ireland
- Original language: English

Original release
- Network: Raidió Teilifís Éireann
- Release: 2 July 1990

Dear Sarah is a 1990 Irish made-for-television film about Giuseppe Conlon who was wrongfully sentenced to twelve years imprisonment after being implicated as one of the Maguire Seven during the 1970s. The film was produced by Raidió Teilifís Éireann, directed by Frank Cvitanovich and written by Tom McGurk. It starred Stella McCusker, Barry McGovern and Paddy Rocks, and was aired in 1990 by RTÉ in Ireland and on the ITV Network in the United Kingdom.

== Plot summary ==
The film is based on the letters Giuseppe Conlon wrote from prison to his wife Sarah after he was wrongfully convicted in 1976 along with seven members of the Maguire family of running an IRA bomb factory in North London. Conlon received twelve years imprisonment but died in custody in 1980.

Sarah Conlon spent many years campaigning to clear the names of her husband, and son Gerry (who had been wrongly jailed over the 1974 Guildford pub bombings). The others jailed along with Giuseppe Conlon were later released after serving their sentences, and the convictions were quashed on appeal in 1991. The Guildford Four had their convictions overturned in 1989.

== Cast ==
- Stella McCusker – Sarah Conlon
- Barry McGovern – Giuseppe Conlon
- Paddy Rocks – Gerry Conlon
- Bronagh Gallagher – Anne Conlon
- Janice McAdam – Bridgid Conlon
- Elsa Johns – Young Sarah
- Eileen Pollock – Mary Kelly
- P.H. Moriarty – Warder Deans
- Maria McDermottroe – Mrs. Moore

== Awards ==
Stella McCusker won a Jacob's Award for her performance as Sarah Conlon.

== See also ==
- In the Name of the Father, a 1993 film which also relates events surrounding the Guildford Four case.
