= Jacqueline McKenzie (lawyer) =

British human rights lawyer

- Born: England
- Other name: Jacqui McKenzie
- Education: St Joseph's Convent and the Institute for Further Education, Grenada; West London University (LLB); University of the Arts London; University of Kent
- Occupation: Lawyer
- Employer: Leigh Day
- Known for: Human rights, immigration law

Jacqueline "Jacqui" McKenzie is a British human rights lawyer specialising in migration, asylum and refugee law. Her legal career encompasses practice in the areas of civil liberties, crime and immigration with solicitors Birnberg Peirce and Partners, and since 2010 running her own immigration consultancy, McKenzie Beute and Pope (MBP), having previously spent more than a decade in senior local government roles with responsibility for equalities, community development, communications and urban development. She joined human rights law firm Leigh Day as a partner in 2021. She is the founder of the Organisation of Migration Advice and Research, which works pro bono with refugees and women who have been trafficked to the UK. McKenzie has won recognition for her work seeking justice for victims of the Windrush scandal that initially gained notoriety in 2018. She was named one of the top 10 most influential black Britons in the Powerlist 2022.

== Early years and education ==
Born in England of Grenadian and Jamaican parentage, McKenzie lived between 1975 and 1981 in Grenada, where she attended St Joseph's Convent and the Institute for Further Education. She studied journalism and media at the University of the Arts London, and read law at West London University (LLB Law), as well as earning postgraduate degrees in International Relations, Human Rights and Documentary Research, at the University of Kent and the University of the Arts London. In addition to being admitted as a solicitor in England and Wales in 2008, McKenzie was called as a barrister to the Eastern Caribbean Supreme Court of Grenada in 2011.

== Career ==
In 1981, McKenzie was employed as a Treasury clerk in the Ministry of Finance, Grenada, then between 1983 and 1985 she worked as a civil servant in the British Department of Health and Social Security, and from 1986 to 2005 she held various positions connected with community relations, including as a race equality officer in the Hackney Council, studying at night school for a law degree.

She became a solicitor practising with Birnberg Peirce and Partners (2005–2010) – the company started by Benedict Birnberg and continued by Gareth Peirce – and has since specialised in civil liberties, immigration and asylum law. In 2010, she established her own firm, McKenzie Beute and Pope (MBP), in Streatham, south London.

During a 2012–2014 sabbatical, McKenzie was chief executive of the female prisoners welfare association, Hibiscus Initiatives, heading a team of professionals doing advocacy and support work with ex-offenders.

She has lectured in equalities, law and international relations at Queen Mary University of London, and Schiller International University, and she is a board member and trustee of several community organisations and policy groups "committed to defending and promoting human rights and championing the causes of those deemed marginalised". McKenzie also provides training in immigration law and policy, including for the CARICOM Diplomatic Corp of High Commissioners in the UK.

In 2015, she founded the Organisation for Migration Advice and Research, which assists people who cannot afford legal services, and undertakes research and policy work.

In 2021, McKenzie joined human rights law firm Leigh Day as a partner.

=== Representing victims of the "Windrush scandal" ===
For years before the harsh effects of the government's hostile environment policy gained national media attention, McKenzie had been helping Caribbean-born Britons and other migrants to prove their right to stay in the UK, where they had come to live decades earlier but had been provided no official documentation. Her work since 2018 has become increasingly focused on compensation claims linked to the Windrush scandal, and she has represented more than 200 of those wrongly classified by the government as illegal immigrants, whereas "They felt they were moving from one part of the Commonwealth to another!" Amelia Gentleman noted in The Guardian: "McKenzie has become one of the most high-profile, vocal campaigners on behalf of Windrush victims. She was aware of the looming Windrush scandal long before it got its name, and her frustration over the continued delays to justice is fuelled by a memory of the years she spent trying and failing to get officials to pay attention."

McKenzie was a member of the independent advisory group that delivered the Windrush Lessons Learned Review, a report published in March 2020 based on an enquiry into the government's handling of the scandal, which concluded that what had happened had been "foreseeable and avoidable", and that immigration regulations had been tightened "with complete disregard for the Windrush generation". The report prompted an official apology from the Home Secretary, Priti Patel. McKenzie has said: "For this lessons-learned review to be meaningful, the recommendations that deal with culture and operations are one thing — but we've got to take a look at the laws ... that are racist in their design."

McKenzie has highlighted the "indefinite pause on justice" caused by the coronavirus emergency and the need to stop wrongful deportation flights.

== Awards ==
In 2020, McKenzie Beute and Pope was chosen by the Black Solicitors Network (BSN) as "Small Law Firm of the Year".

McKenzie was recognised for her work fighting for justice after the Windrush Scandal in the annual Powerlist, ranking at number seven in the Top 10 of the Powerlist 2021, compiling the most influential people of African, African American and African Caribbean heritage in the UK. At Powerful Media's Virtual Black Excellence Awards in November 2020, McKenzie was presented with the #Powerlist2021 Humanitarian Award for her work seeking justice for those affected by the Windrush scandal.

She was named at number 10 on the Powerlist 2022 of most influential black Britons.

== See also ==
- Benedict Birnberg
- Ian Macdonald QC
