= Benedict Birnberg =

British solicitor and human rights campaigner (1930–2023)

- Born: Benedict Michael Birnberg; 8 September 1930; Stepney, London, England
- Died: 13 October 2023 (aged 93)
- Education: Corpus Christi College, Cambridge
- Occupation: Solicitor
- Known for: Human rights campaigner
- Spouse: Felitsa Matziorini (m. 1968)
- Children: 1
- Relatives: Norman Bentwich (uncle)

Benedict Michael Birnberg (8 September 1930 – 13 October 2023) was a British solicitor and a radical campaigner for human rights. Until his retirement in 1999, Birnberg was senior partner in the eponymous firm he founded in 1962, and he is considered a pioneer fighter against miscarriages of justice, who for more than 40 years "acted for clients ranging from the eccentric to the eclectic" – from high-profile cases to the "unfashionable".

== Biography ==
Benedict Michael Birnberg was born on 8 September 1930 in Stepney, London, to parents who were both schoolteachers. His father was mathematician Jonas Birnberg, who had taught for almost 40 years at Colfes Grammar School in Blackheath, and at Goldsmiths College until his death in 1970; and his mother Naomi (d. 1988) was the sister of Norman de Mattos Bentwich, and had set up a school in Birchington, Kent, attended by Jewish children including refugees.

Birnberg read History at Corpus Christi College, Cambridge, going on to become a solicitor in London in the late 1950s. He set up his company B. M. Birnberg in 1962, operating from "cramped offices" in Borough High Street in Southwark, and practising as senior partner until his retirement in 1999. He was associated with many radical causes and was particularly notable for acting on behalf of wronged criminals, as when in 1998 he secured an official pardon for Derek Bentley, who had been wrongfully hanged in 1953.

The Independent characterised Birnberg as having "acted for clients ranging from the eccentric to the eclectic – from high-profile cases such as Derek Bentley, Richard Branson and Vanessa Redgrave, to the 'unfashionable', as the solicitor himself describes Moors murderer Ian Brady." Birnberg was described by anarchist writer and publisher Stuart Christie as "probably the key civil rights lawyer in the UK". After the Mangrove Restaurant in Notting Hill was broken into by police in 1988 allegedly to seize drugs, with its owner Frank Crichlow spending five weeks in custody before being given bail, Birnberg's firm was part of the legal team that demolished the evidence, resulting in the jury throwing out the charges, with the Metropolitan Police subsequently being successfully sued for false imprisonment, battery and malicious prosecution.

Birnberg served as an executor of the estate of influential Trinidadian historian C. L. R. James, who died in 1989.

Many notable solicitors started their careers with Birnberg, including human rights activist Gareth Peirce, Imran Khan (who acted for the Stephen Lawrence case), Jacqueline McKenzie (now associated with representing victims of the Windrush scandal), and Paul Boateng, who went on to become in 1987 one of the first Black British MPs. Boateng has described him as a "legal hero", writing in The Guardian:

To work with Ben Birnberg was to occupy a world in which the clients were varied and the causes mixed and not always popular. Birnberg had begun his civil liberties work with CND and represented Equity in its internal battles over the boycott of South Africa. The Redgraves were frequently in the office, as were numerous ANC luminaries. He fought for gay rights before the term was invented, representing the Albany Trust. He struck a blow for artistic freedom, defending David Hockney's right to bring back magazines deemed obscene by customs and excise.

After Birnberg retired in 1999, Gareth Peirce continued to work as a senior partner of the company now known as Birnberg Peirce.

Birnberg died from pneumonia on 13 October 2023, at the age of 93. His death was first announced in an article published in The Law Society Gazette on 26 October.
