= 15 Maiden Lane =

1936 film by Allan Dwan

- Promotional poster
- Directed by: Allan Dwan
- Written by: Lou Breslow; Paul Burger; John Patrick; David Silverstein
- Produced by: Sol M. Wurtzel
- Starring: Claire Trevor; Cesar Romero; Lloyd Nolan; Douglas Fowley
- Cinematography: John F. Seitz
- Edited by: Alex Troffey
- Music by: Samuel Kaylin
- Distributed by: 20th Century Fox
- Release date: October 16, 1936
- Running time: 65 minutes
- Country: United States
- Language: English

15 Maiden Lane is a 1936 American crime film directed by Allan Dwan and starring Claire Trevor, Cesar Romero, and Lloyd Nolan. The Museum of Modern Art in New York City screened a restored print of the film in June 2013 as part of an Allan Dwan retrospective.

== Plot ==
An insurance investigator infiltrates a gang who has stolen jewels from the eponymous building on Maiden Lane in the Fulton Street District of Manhattan.

== Cast ==
- Claire Trevor as Jane Martin
- Cesar Romero as Frank Peyton
- Lloyd Nolan as Detective Walsh
- Douglas Fowley as Nick Shelby
- Lester Matthews as Gilbert Lockhart
- Robert McWade as John Graves
- Holmes Herbert as Harold Anderson
- Paul Fix as Agitator
- Ernie Stanton as Charles - Peyton's Butler (uncredited)
