= Sarah Conlon =

20th- and 21st-century Northern Irish activist

- Born: 20 January 1926; Belfast, Northern Ireland
- Died: 19 July 2008 (aged 82); Belfast, Northern Ireland
- Occupation: Housewife
- Spouse: Patrick "Giuseppe" Conlon
- Children: Gerry Conlon; Ann McKernan nee Conlon

Sarah Conlon (née Maguire; 20 January 1926 – 19 July 2008) was an Irish housewife and a prominent campaigner in one of the most high-profile miscarriage of justice cases in British legal history. She spent decades clearing the names of her husband Giuseppe and son Gerry over the Provisional Irish Republican Army (IRA) pub bombings at Guildford and Woolwich, and helped secure an apology from British prime minister Tony Blair in 2005 for their wrongful imprisonment.

== Guildford pub bombings ==
In 1974, an IRA unit planted bombs in two pubs in Guildford, Surrey, killing four soldiers and one civilian, and injured 50 others. Gerard Conlon, Patrick Armstrong, Paul Hill and Carole Richardson, dubbed as "the Guildford Four", were arrested, convicted, and jailed for life in 1975, with each serving 15 years in jail before their convictions were quashed by the Court of Appeal, after an extensive inquiry carried out by Avon and Somerset Police into the original police investigation. The inquiry found that the way the confessions of the four were noted was seriously flawed, concluding that the notes taken were not written up immediately and that officers may have colluded in the wording of the statements.

Giuseppe Conlon, Sarah's husband, was convicted in 1976 along with six members of the Maguire family, dubbed as the Maguire Seven, of running an IRA bomb factory in North London, on the basis of what turned out to be faulty forensic evidence. Each was sentenced to up to 14 years in jail, served their sentences, and with the exception of Giuseppe Conlon who died in 1980, released. The Maguire Seven's first appeal, in 1977, was turned down, but a later appeal, prompted by the release of the Guildford Four, found that test kits used to detect traces of explosives had been contaminated. In 1991, the Court of Appeal quashed their convictions after it was ruled the original evidence against them was unsafe. On 9 February 2005, then Prime Minister Tony Blair issued a public apology to the Maguire Seven and the Guildford Four for the miscarriages of justice they had suffered, saying that he was "very sorry that they were subject to such an ordeal and such an injustice", and that "they deserve to be completely and publicly exonerated."

The 1993 film In the Name of the Father, while changing some of the details of the cases from real life, showed how the Maguire Seven and Guildford Four became victims of a police force desperate to obtain a conviction under any circumstances to appease an upset public and senior justice officials.

== Role in the sentences and appeals ==
Sarah Conlon won huge admiration in Ireland for her quiet dignity and refusal to feel bitterness. During the years that her husband and son were in jail, she sent weekly parcels of cigarettes, sweets, and Irish newspaper clippings to them, and saved up her prison visits for the two weeks of her annual holiday. Her regular letters to them always ended the same way: "Pray for them ones who told lies against you... It's them who needs help as well as yourself."

Father McKinley, a priest who noticed Sarah crying after the 1977 appeal was turned down, and others helped her begin a campaign to free her husband, son and other members of the Guildford Four and Maguire Seven. She took to lobbying dignitaries, church leaders and the media, in addition to writing to numerous Irish politicians, including the Social Democratic and Labour Party (SDLP) members of parliament Joe Hendron and John Hume, to ask for their support. At one stage she travelled to London to meet Cardinal Basil Hume to ask for his assistance. Her campaigning led to the start of the aforementioned inquiry, announced in 1989 by the home secretary Douglas Hurd, into the Guildford bomb cases, which led to Gerry's release. News of her husband's death reached Sarah just after she received a message from home secretary Willie Whitelaw stating that her husband was about to be released on compassionate grounds.

Twenty-five years after her husband's death, Sarah Conlon and her family decided to fight for a public apology for the miscarriage of justice on her family. Once again she led the campaign, lobbying church leaders and politicians, among them the Irish Taoiseach Bertie Ahern, who pledged his support, which culminated in Tony Blair's apology to the Conlon family. Ill, she was unable to make the trip to London to hear the apology, but her children spoke to her by telephone from the House of Commons. After securing the apology, she mentioned that she no longer had to worry about dying and what it means.

SDLP leader and Foyle member of parliament Mark Durkan described Sarah as "a true heroine of our age" and "shining example to us all", saying that she had the "patience of a saint" and "huge reserves of faith, fortitude and remarkable forgiveness", and that "her story is an inspiration of faith, hope and love".

== Personal life ==
Conlon was described as a woman of "immense Catholic faith" who was protective of her son Gerry, and who held the family together with her hard work, wanting their life to be respectable, holy, and quiet. She spent years working at a scrapyard sorting old clothes, and later worked long hours for low pay in the kitchens of the Royal Victoria Hospital, serving food to patients and mopping the floors.

Conlon's husband, Patrick "Giuseppe", was a pacifist who evaded the draft during World War II. He once worked at Harland & Wolf painting the hulls of ships, where the lead in the paint damaged his lungs. His condition was worsened by the humidity and condensation in the house, and he subsequently developed tuberculosis and emphysema.

Sarah Conlon died of lung cancer in July 2008, aged 82.

== In popular culture ==
The film In the Name of the Father (1993), directed by Jim Sheridan and starring Daniel Day-Lewis, is based on the Conlon family's story. Actress Marie Jones portrayed Sarah Conlon. The film was adapted from Gerry Conlon's autobiography Proved Innocent, later published as In the Name of the Father.

The 1990 made-for-television film Dear Sarah is based on the letters Giuseppe Conlon wrote to his wife while in prison. The film was produced by Raidió Teilifís Éireann, directed by Frank Cvitanovich and written by Tom McGurk. It featured Stella McCusker as Sarah Conlon.
