= Bentham Grammar School =

School in North Yorkshire, England

Coordinates: 54.1174°N 2.5440°W

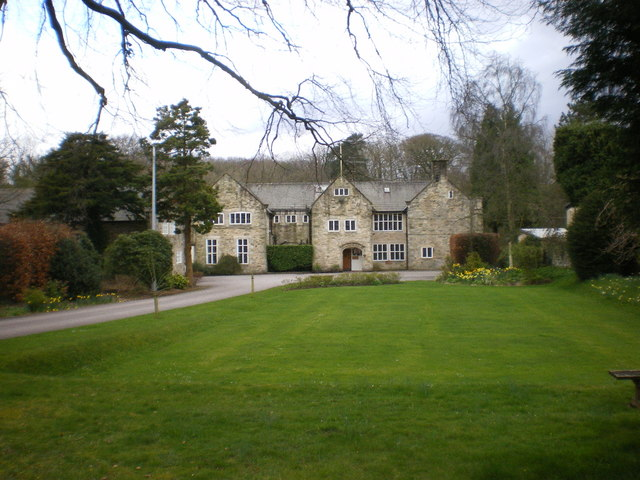
The school building in 2009

Bentham Grammar School was an independent school in Bentham, North Yorkshire, England. The school, which was founded in 1726, closed in 2002 owing to dwindling pupil numbers.

== History ==
Bentham Grammar School was founded as a charity in 1726 in the village of Bentham by William Collingwood, a gentleman of York. His will provided for two masters, an Upper Master and a Lower Master, both "educated according to the rule of Oxford and Cambridge". It educated first the boys of the local villages and later, in the twentieth century, also fee-paying boarders from a wider area. Girls were educated in small numbers until the 1930s when the school became fully co-educational.

The first school was situated on School Hill in High Bentham, but after the Elementary Education Act 1870, the building was required for state elementary education and the school moved to a site at Moon's Acre in 1878. The Factory Acts of 1838 and 1844 required children working in the local textile mills to have some half-day education, and that provision was catered for, as was the developing Victorian curriculum.

Even so, by the early twentieth century the school still only numbered 40–50 pupils. The first two headmasters of the 20th century both came from Nottingham. John Llewellyn (1893–1907) had taught John Player, the future tobacco magnate, and Jesse Boot, instrumental in the early years of Boots the Chemist. His successor, Theodore Bayley Hardy VC, DSO, MC was the most decorated non-combatant of the First World War.

In the inter-war years, the school continued to educate children up to the statutory school-leaving age, but many who were looking to advance into tertiary education would transfer to either Giggleswick School or Lancaster Royal Grammar School. Under headmaster George Percy Gill (1920–1937) students from mainland Europe were welcomed as teaching assistants. In 1945, the then headmaster, Ronald Purdy, decided to remove the majority of the school to a newly-founded school at Eshton, near Gargrave, leaving a reduced school for its governors to re-establish.

In 1948 under its new post-war headmaster, John Webb (father of Jean Webb, otherwise known as the human rights lawyer Gareth Peirce), the school moved again, this time to the Norman Shaw rectory building in Low Bentham. After 1946 pupil numbers steadily grew – including local children passing the 11-plus examination from either Yorkshire or Lancashire - until the school was admitting between 300 and 400 boys and girls.

An important aspect of the school was its independence, one of the most striking examples of which was the self-help model which the Webbs and their staff adopted partly out of necessity and partly as policy. ’Self-help’ meant that the pupils and staff were involved in the construction and maintenance of new buildings and facilities. This attracted wide attention and, in 1956, the BBC made a film of the school that depicted its work and life.

The school provided a full range of academic and practical education, catering for pupils of a wide range of age and ability from nursery to Oxbridge and, by the 1980s, often from differing backgrounds, including a number with disabilities. It attracted students from all parts of the world. The school continued to educate between 200 and 300 pupils into the 1990s.

There was extensive work beyond the classroom in areas such as sport and outward-bound activities (including a full Duke of Edinburgh Award Scheme), drama, music and public speaking.

== Closure ==
The School closed in August 2002 due to falling pupil numbers.

After its closure, the site was taken over by Sedbergh School as its junior department, which was later transferred to Sedbergh itself in 2008. The building is now owned by the Witherslack Group as Cedar House School, a school for children with behavioural, emotional and social difficulties such as communication difficulties and complex learning difficulties.

== Notable alumni ==
- Atupele Muluzi, Malawian politician
- Gareth Peirce, human rights lawyer
- Charles Ng, serial killer
