= Fly Market =

Historic outdoor market in New York

Coordinates: 40°42′23″N 74°0′23″W

The Fly Market or Fly Market was an outdoor market located at the base of Maiden Lane, near the East River in Manhattan, New York City. Operating from 1699 to the early 1800s, the market sold meat, country produce and fish under its covered roofs.

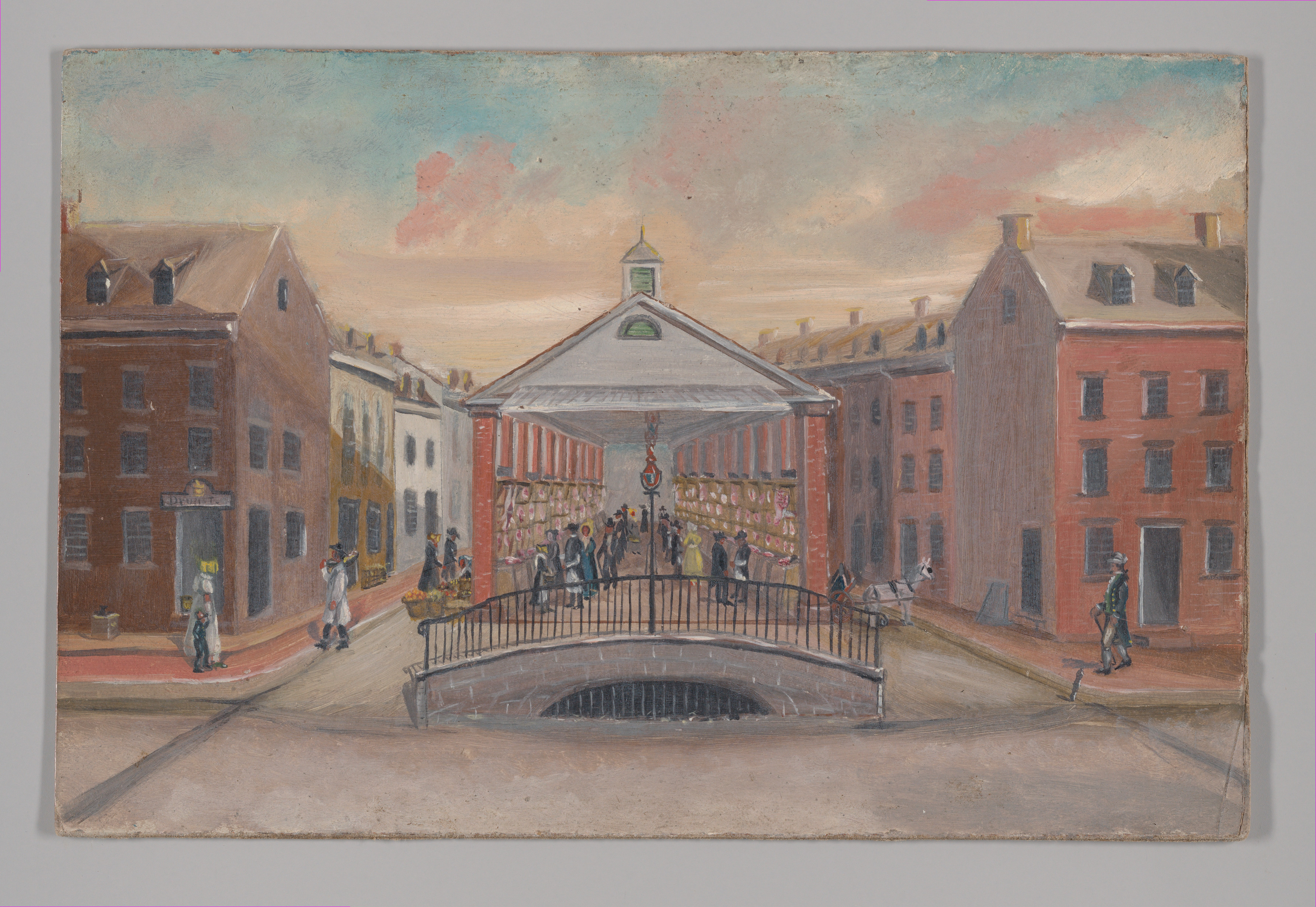
The Old Fly Market in 1808 on Maiden Lane and Pearl St

== History ==
The land on which the market was held was originally a salt marsh with a brook. By the early 1800s, the "Fly Market" had become the city's principal market. From the late 18th century until its demise, The Fly Market was New York's oldest market.

=== Fly Market Slip ===
Fly Market Slip was an extension of the market into the East River, beginning at the end of the road now known as Maiden Lane, between Pearl and South Streets. The slip was earlier known as Maiden Slip and Countess Slip; however, when the public Fly Market was built there in 1706, the name changed as well. The original slip was filled to South Street about 1820 and was made part of Maiden Lane in 1824. After the slip was filled in, the new space between the piers retained the Fly Market Slip name.

=== Etymology of Fly Market name ===
The word "Fly" in Fly Market does not refer to insects. It comes from the Dutch vly, meaning a valley or low-lying area. In Dutch the letter V is pronounced F.

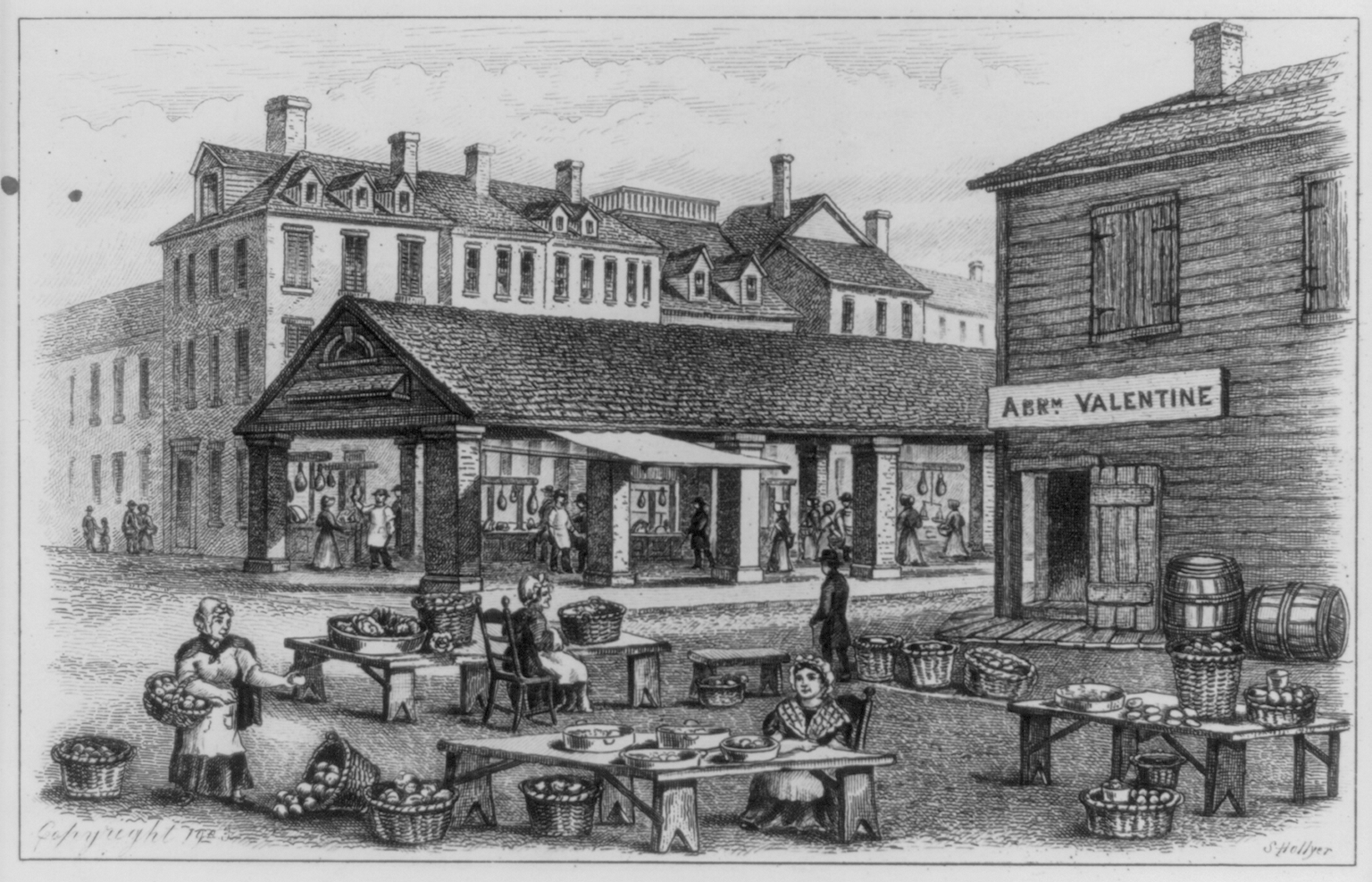
Fly Market, 1816

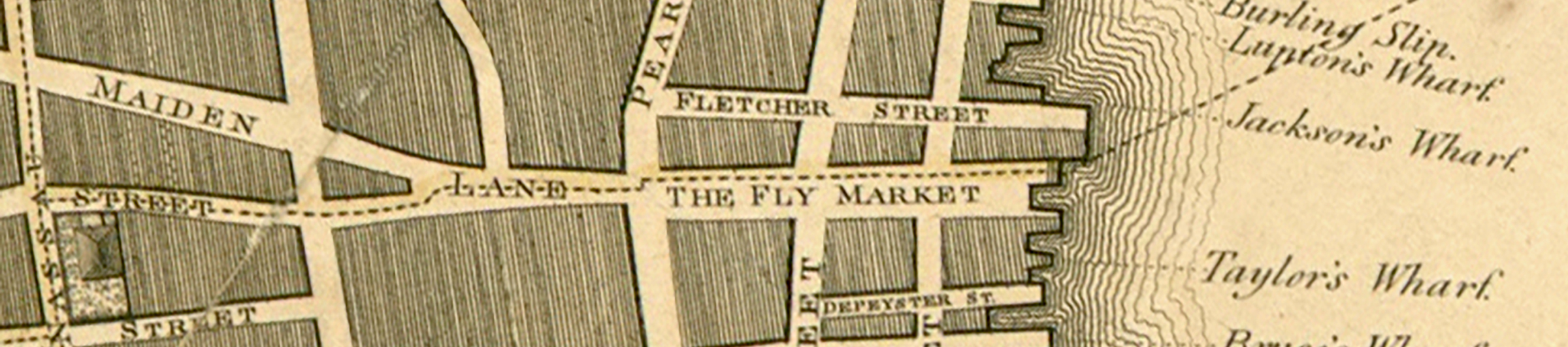
Maiden Lane runs into The Fly Market in this 1797 Taylor map of the City of New York
