= Jordu Schell =

American sculptor and concept artist (born 1967)

- Born: June 5, 1967 (age 59)
- Occupations: Sculptor; concept artist

Jordu Schell (born June 5, 1967) is an American sculptor and concept artist who has been working in the film and television industries for over twenty years.

== Career ==
Jordu Schell began his career as a sculptor and Halloween mask maker. He primarily sculpts in clay and other physical materials, rather than in CGI or in 2-D drawings, although he works in those forms as well.

Schell first started designing FX for Hollywood on Bride of Re-Animator, and went on from there to work with Stan Winston on such movies as Predator 2, Edward Scissorhands, and Batman Returns. In television, he designed aliens for the opening season of Babylon 5.

From 2005 to 2007, Schell was instrumental in the design of the Na'vi and other creatures in James Cameron's movie Avatar, shaping the designs of the characters with physical sculptures when Cameron felt that the CGI designs were not capturing his vision. Schell sculpted numerous maquettes to help solidify the look of the Na'vi race, often working in the kitchen of Cameron's Malibu home.

Films for which Schell has designed creatures and characters subsequent to his work on Avatar include The Mist, AVPR, Prince Caspian, Spike, Creature of Darkness, and Dragonball Evolution, as well as working in various FX capacities on several others.

Schell also teaches classes in sculpting and design at his studio and, in addition, sometimes works in the video game industry.

== Filmography ==
- Bride of Re-Animator (1990)
- Predator 2 (1990)
- Puppet Master II (1991)
- Guyver (1991)
- Nemesis (1992)
- The Silence of the Hams (1994)
- Hellraiser: Bloodline (1996)
- Sometimes They Come Back... Again (1996)
- Escape from L.A. (1996)
- Face/Off (1997)
- Starship Troopers (1997)
- Alien: Resurrection (1997)
- The X-Files (1998)
- Patch Adams (1998)
- My Favorite Martian (1999)
- Bicentennial Man (1999)
- Galaxy Quest (1999)
- Hollow Man (2000)
- Bedazzled (2000)
- Evolution (2001)
- Planet of the Apes (2001)
- Hulk (2003)
- Scary Movie 3 (2003)
- Dawn of the Dead (2004)
- Hellboy (2004)
- Blade: Trinity (2004)
- Reeker (2005)
- Feast (2005)
- 300 (2006)
- The Haunting Hour: Don't Think About It (2007)
- The Mist (2007)
- Aliens vs. Predator: Requiem (2007)
- Cloverfield (2008)
- The Chronicles of Narnia: Prince Caspian (2008)
- Spike (2008)
- Creature of Darkness (2009)
- Dragonball Evolution (2009)
- Avatar (2009)
