= Maiden Lane (Manhattan) =

Street in Manhattan, New York

Coordinates: 40°42′27″N 74°00′28″W

- Maagde Paatje (formerly)
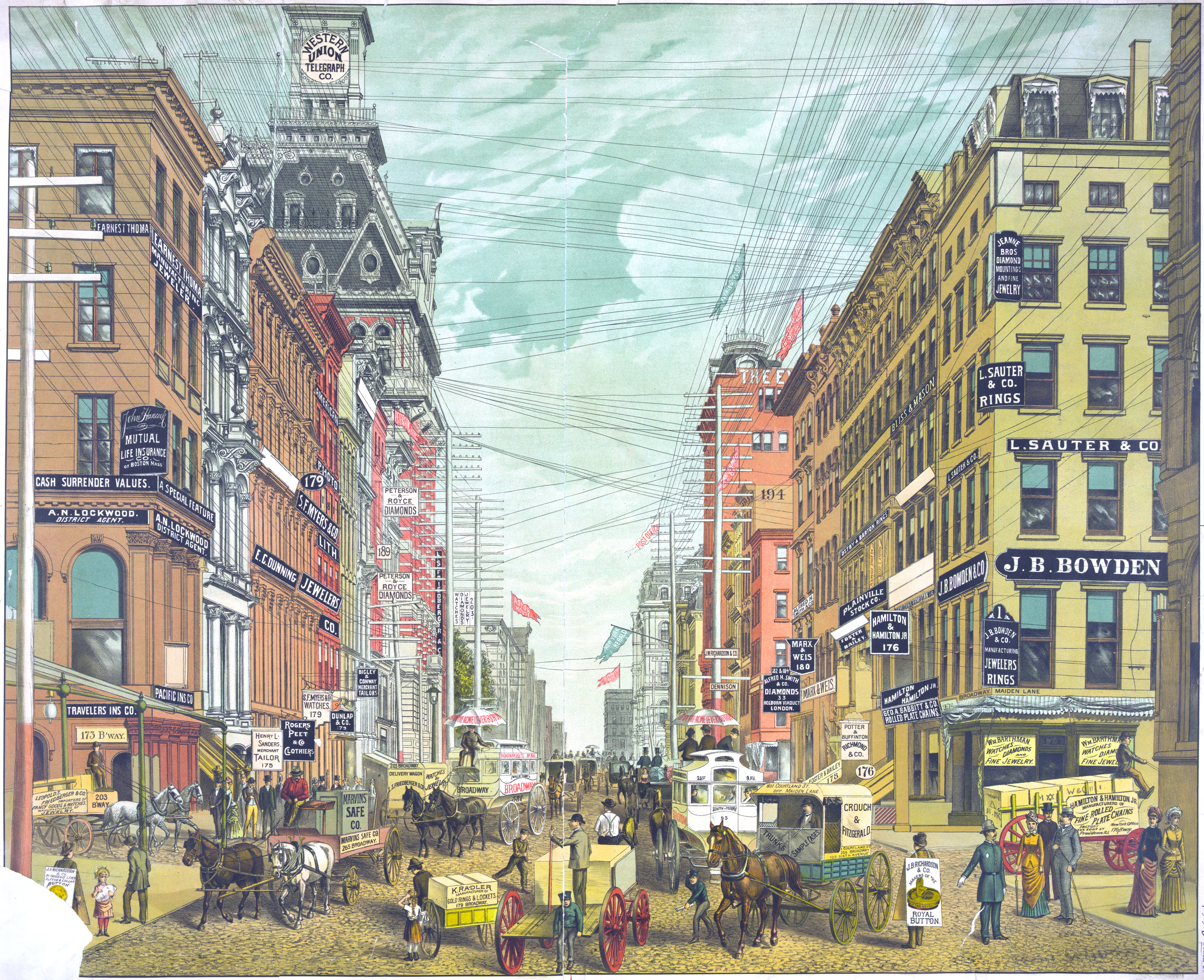
- Looking up Broadway from the corner of Maiden Lane (at right) c. 1885–87
- Interactive map of Maiden Lane
- Location: Lower Manhattan, New York City, U.S.
- Northwest end: Broadway
- Southeast end: South Street

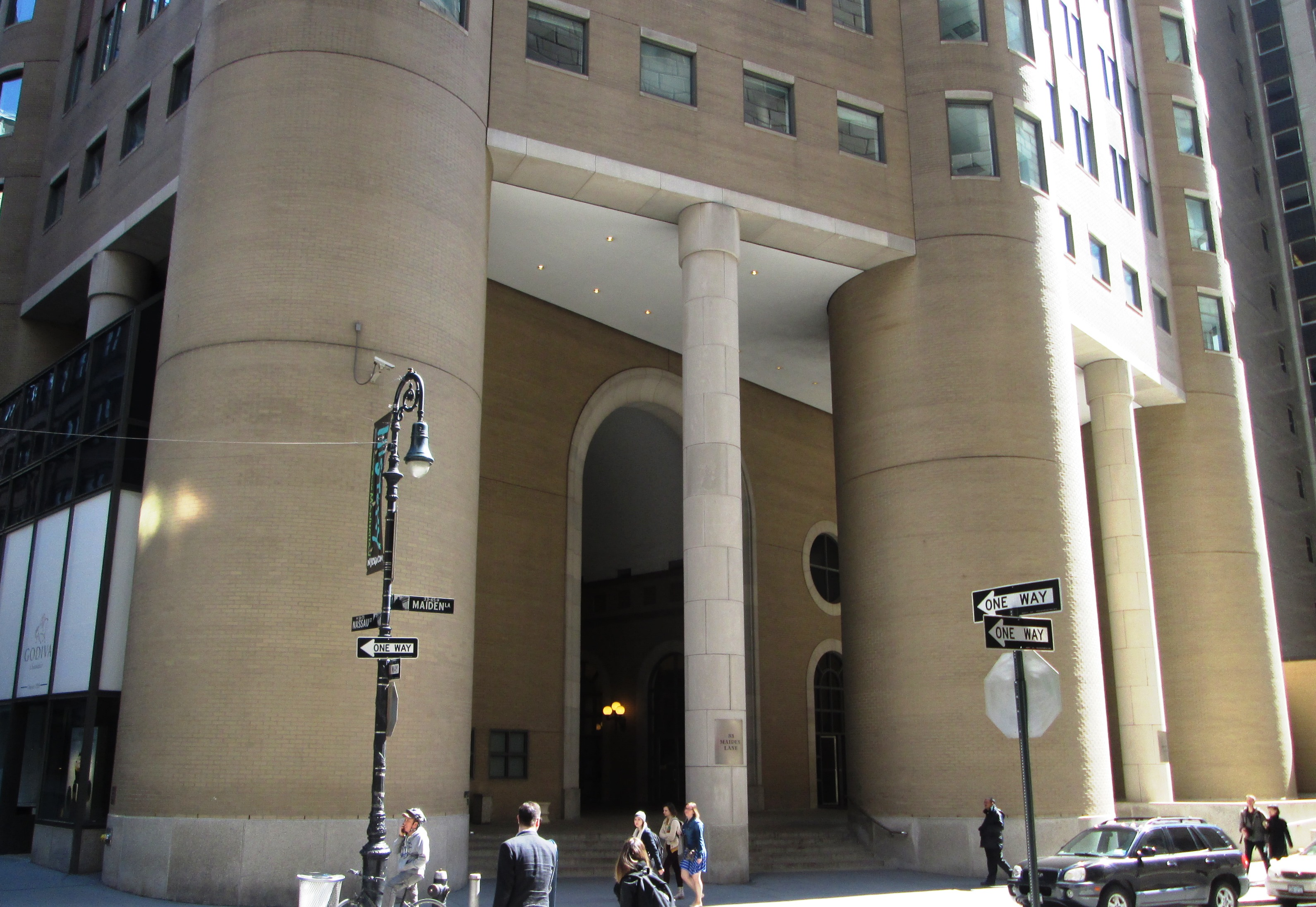
The street level of 33 Maiden Lane, designed by Philip Johnson and John Burgee and built in 1984–86

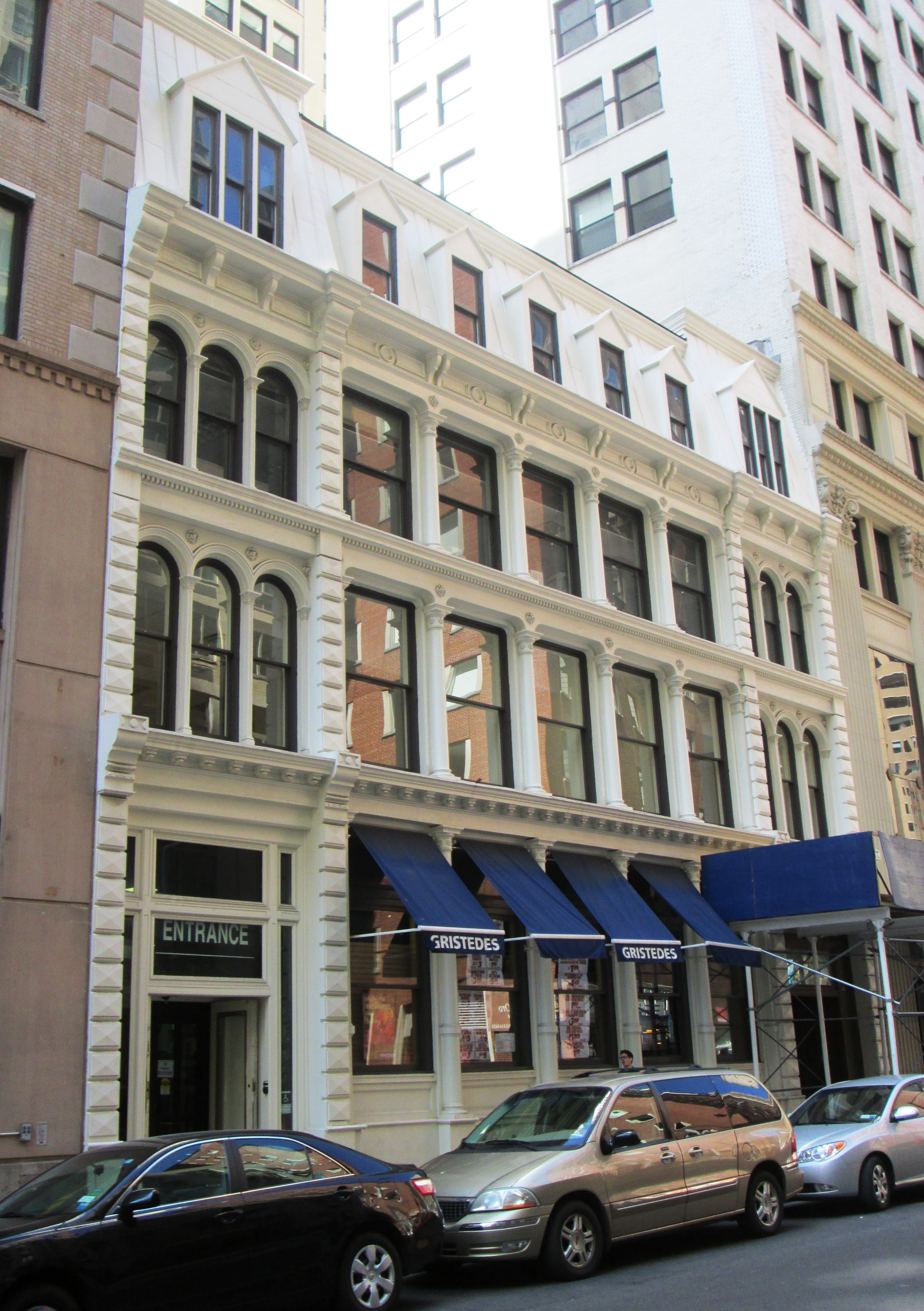
90–94 Maiden Lane, one of the few mid-19th century commercial buildings still standing in Lower Manhattan

Maiden Lane is an east–west street in the Financial District of Lower Manhattan, New York City. Its eastern end is at South Street, near the South Street Seaport, and its western end is at Broadway near the World Trade Center site, where it becomes Cortlandt Street.

== Etymology ==
The street's modern name is a translation of the Dutch Maagde Paatje. The name belonged originally to a footpath running along a brook that flowed from Nassau Street to the East River. The women of New Amsterdam would wash and bleach their laundry here, hence the reference to "maidens".

== History ==
=== Development ===
The street was formally laid out in 1696, the first street north of still-palisaded Wall Street.

By 1728, a market was held at the foot of Maiden Lane, where it ended at Front Street facing the East River; by 1823, when it was demolished and disbanded, the Fly Market, (Note: Fly here represents dialectal Dutch vlei, meaning "valley".) selling meat, country produce and fish under its covered roofs, was New York's oldest. It eventually gave way to the Fulton Fish Market, and later, the New Amsterdam Market. The Fly Market, and its successor the Fulton Fish Market, which moved to the Bronx in 2005, was one of New York's earliest open-air fish markets. From a New York newspaper dated 1831:

In New York, there are a number of Markets. Those called Fulton and Washington Markets are the largest. Fulton Market is at the East end of Fulton Street near the East River...The first was formerly situated in Maiden Lane on the East River side, and was called Fly Market.

The New York Slave Revolt of 1712 happened around Maiden Lane, in which 23 black slaves revolted, killing nine white men and women and injuring six other whites.

In September 1732, a company of professional actors arrived from London and took an upstairs room near the junction of Pearl Street which was fitted up with a platform stage, and marked the origin of professional theater in New York; by the time the company was disbanded in 1734, their building was known as the Play House.

In the spring of 1790, Thomas Jefferson rented a house at 57 Maiden Lane when he moved to New York to serve as the Secretary of State under George Washington. His dinner on June 20, 1790 at that house with Alexander Hamilton and James Madison produced the Compromise of 1790, whereby Hamilton won the decision for the national government to take over and pay the state debts, while Jefferson and Madison obtained the national capital (District of Columbia) for the South. The dinner was celebrated in the song "The Room Where It Happens" in the Broadway musical Hamilton.

=== Shopping district ===
Maiden Lane was a street of shops by the end of the 18th century, even before the new fashion for multi-paned shop windows caught on in the city. In 1827 the skylit New York Arcade, banking on the fashionable success of London's Burlington Arcade (1819), spanned the block between Maiden Lane and John Street east of Broadway with forty smart shops; however, while regarded as beautiful by many, it was also financially disastrous, and Charles Haynes Haswell recalled that "it had not the success that had been anticipated...and survived but a few years".

Maiden Lane was soon one of the first city streets to be lit with gas lamps, which led to its being a popular shopping street. The slip at the foot of Maiden Lane was infilled in the early 19th century, accounting for the widened stretch in the last blocks before South Street, the present waterfront. The water of the erstwhile brook ran down the center of the street, until 1827, when a suggestion was made in Common Council to close it over and lead rainwater to the side gutters.

One of the handful of mid-19th century commercial structures still standing in the Financial District, is 90–94 Maiden Lane, built for Roosevelt & Son, with a cast-iron front (attributed to Charles Wright, 1870–71) by Daniel D. Badger. (Note: Badger also supplied the cast-iron for the landmarked E. V. Haughwout Building (1857).)

In 1977, the Louise Nevelson Plaza, a triangular-shaped plaza at William Street, opened.

=== Jewelry district ===
From 1795 until the early 20th century, Maiden Lane was the center of the jewelry district. At Broadway, the bronze and glass clock embedded in the sidewalk by William Barthman Jewelers still keeps time. In 1894 developers Boehm & Coon erected the ten story Diamond Exchange Building on 14 Maiden Lane, which was specially designed to accommodate the heavy safes used by gem dealers. According to a New York Times article in 1924, "the bride-to-be who could show a ring from Maiden Lane was thrice happy" because of the abundance of jewelry stores. In 1946 the New York City Police Department estimated that it was walked on by 51,000 people every weekday between 11 a.m. and 2 p.m. The 1936 crime film 15 Maiden Lane started with jewels being stolen from a building on Maiden Lane.

The jewelry industry started to move north by the 1920s, but had previously and fruitlessly tried to move uptown in the 1870s and 1900s. This was in part because the buildings on Maiden Lane had begun to age, even in the 1910s. Because of the city's rapid growth after World War II, this district was later moved to Chinatown on the Bowery and Canal Street, and to West 47th Street, forming a new district of New York, the Diamond District.

== Notable buildings ==
- 14 Maiden Lane, the Diamond Exchange Building
- 33 Maiden Lane, now part of the Federal Reserve Bank of New York Building
- 57 Maiden Lane, briefly the residence of Thomas Jefferson where the Compromise of 1790 was agreed to. Later popularized in the Hamilton song "The Room Where It Happens".
- 59 Maiden Lane, Home Insurance Plaza
- 90–94 Maiden Lane, a cast-iron building attributed to Charles Wright
- 161 Maiden Lane or One Seaport, an unfinished residential skyscraper with a three-inch lean
- 180 Maiden Lane, the Continental Center

== References in popular culture ==
The Maid of Maiden Lane, written by Amelia E. Barr, is set in the 18th century. It was published in 1900.

Maiden Lane's jewelry district was referred to in the 1936 American crime film 15 Maiden Lane.
