= Spike (2008 film) =

2008 American horror film

- Directed by: Robert Beaucage
- Written by: Robert Beaucage
- Produced by: Devin DiGonno; Erik Rodgers
- Cinematography: Matthew Boyd; Andrew Parke
- Edited by: Eric Grush
- Music by: Eric Santiestevan
- Distributed by: Maverick Entertainment
- Release date: June 20, 2008 (Edinburgh International Film Festival)
- Running time: 80 minutes
- Country: United States
- Language: English

Spike is a 2008 horror-romance film directed by Robert Beaucage, produced by String And A Can Productions, and starring Edward Gusts, Sarah Livingston Evans, Anna-Marie Wayne, Nancy P. Corbo, and Jared Edwards. The film has been described by Robert Hope as "Angela Carter rewriting La Belle et la Bête as an episode of Buffy the Vampire Slayer."

== Plot ==
Through a series of dreamlike images, a girl and her three friends find themselves stranded in a dark and surrealistic forest by someone — or something — who has obsessively loved, watched, and waited for the girl ever since childhood.

== Cast ==
- Sarah Livingston Evans as The Girl
- Jared Edwards as Her Boyfriend
- Anna-Marie Wayne as His Sister
- Nancy P. Corbo as Her Girlfriend
- Edward Gusts as Spike

== Production ==
The film was produced by String And A Can Productions, with Erik Rodgers and Devin DiGonno serving as the principal producers on the project.

=== Filming ===
Filming for Spike took place just off the Angeles Crest Highway, high in the mountains of the Angeles National Forest, entirely at night in the spring of 2007 (in locations that burned down two years later in the Station Fire). Treacherous terrain and temperatures dropping below 15 °F, well below freezing, made filming difficult, and delays were caused by rain, snow, and even hail. Robert Beaucage directed the film from a screenplay he was inspired to write by the stories of "Cupid and Psyche, Hades and Persephone... Beauty and the Beast, as well as horror classics such as Frankenstein and The Hunchback of Notre-Dame". He chose to shoot on 16 mm film rather than a digital format, despite the production's tight schedule and low budget, in order to give the film a different "feel" from the typical contemporary indie movie, the overwhelming majority of which are shot digitally.

=== Design ===
Seeking a more natural look (rather than CGI) for the film's special effects, Beaucage chose veteran concept artist and sculptor Jordu Schell to create the unique design of Spike's title character, which Schell worked into his schedule even while concurrently shaping the design of the Na'vi with James Cameron for Avatar.

== Reception ==
=== Release ===
Announced in Variety as "a horror fairy tale from U.S. director Robert Beaucage, whom [festival director Hannah] McGill had never heard of before he wowed her with an unsolicited DVD", Spike had its world premiere at the 62nd Edinburgh International Film Festival on 20 June 2008, the festival's first year in its new June slot after having, in previous years, taken place in autumn. The film subsequently played the North American film festival circuit at such festivals as the Berkshire International Film Festival and Shriekfest.

Spike was released in North America on DVD in the summer of 2010 by Maverick Entertainment.

=== Critical analysis ===
When first released, Spike was referred to by The List as a film that "overturns genre conventions to explore the darker side of fairytale mythology", and the All Movie Guide called it a "dark fairy tale that's not for the faint of heart". Calum Waddell, a film critic for magazines such as Dreamwatch and Fangoria, called Spike "assured and stylish... a promising debut" and praised its "mix of David Lynch, The Brothers Grimm, and Shakespeare", while adding a reservation that the film "does not seem to know what it wants to be". Others were more positive, such as the North Adams Transcript which wrote about the film's "artful" exploration of "both the tenderness and madness of monsters, as well as the many faces of love—most importantly, the destructive ones" and Moviestar magazine which, in its coverage of the EIFF, referred to Spike as "an original take on the genre" and said that it "delivered both thrills and chills".

=== Awards ===
Spike was chosen as part of the Edinburgh International Film Festival's Best of the Fest in 2008 and won Best Fantasy Feature Film at Los Angeles's Shriekfest in 2009.
