= Erik Rodgers =

American film director

Erik Rodgers is an American film writer, director, and producer who currently resides in Los Angeles, CA. He is one of the founding members of String And A Can Productions, Inc.

== Early life ==
Erik Rodgers was born in Albuquerque, New Mexico and attended the University of New Mexico, where he graduated with a degree in Theatre and English Literature. He founded a short lived theatre, PS 66, which presented two theatrical works in repertory, Kerouac and The Box, written and directed by Erik Rodgers, and Cafe Depresso, by Tom Vegh.

He subsequently moved to Los Angeles, CA and worked as a lighting technician on film before founding String And A Can Productions, Inc. with Devin DiGonno and Antoinette Peskoff in June 2003.

== Film career ==
After making a short film, The Morning After which was developed and shot through improv, Rodgers made his feature film directorial debut, Disappearing In America, which was co-written with David Polcyn, and premiered the Newport Beach Film Festival in 2008. The film, about a fugitive IRA bomber seeking a new life in America, starred David Polcyn, Mark Pelligrino, Devin DiGonno, Richard Eden, and Anna Marie Wayne. The film was produced in association with Damian Collier (as Damian Collier Entertainment) and released to DVD by Anthem Pictures in 2009.

With String And A Can Productions, he then produced Spike, a horror-romance written and directed by Robert Beaucage. The film was selected as Best of the Fest in 2008 at the Edinburgh International Film Festival and won Best Fantasy Feature Film at Los Angeles's Shriekfest in 2009.

== Theatre ==
Rodgers returned to theatre in 2009 with Black Sun, a Play about the Life and Death of Harry Crosby, about the lives of Harry and Caresse Crosby and the Black Sun Press. The work received some attention after a staged reading at Beyond Baroque in Venice, CA.

== Books ==
In November 2011, Rodgers launched a science fiction ebook series entitled Wetwire. In December he released a book of short fiction, entitled Small Histories.

== Other writing ==
Rodgers has had poetry published in Conceptions Southwest, and film criticism online at Culture Vulture and The Simon.

== Current projects ==
In 2010, Rodgers completed filming of a psychological horror-thriller Carrier and a found footage project, Gravity Hill.
