= In the Name of the Father =

1993 film by Jim Sheridan

- Theatrical release poster
- Directed by: Jim Sheridan
- Screenplay by: Terry George; Jim Sheridan
- Based on: Proved Innocent: The Story of Gerry Conlon of the Guildford Four; 1991 autobiography by Gerry Conlon
- Produced by: Jim Sheridan
- Starring: Daniel Day-Lewis; Emma Thompson; Pete Postlethwaite
- Cinematography: Peter Biziou
- Edited by: Gerry Hambling
- Music by: Trevor Jones
- Production company: Hell's Kitchen Films
- Distributed by: Universal Pictures (through United International Pictures)
- Release dates: 12 December 1993 (Ireland); 13 December 1993 (Belfast); 29 December 1993 (United States)
- Running time: 133 minutes
- Countries: Ireland; United Kingdom; United States
- Language: English
- Budget: $14-15 million
- Box office: $65.8 million

In the Name of the Father is a 1993 biographical crime drama film produced and directed by Jim Sheridan, and written by Sheridan and Terry George, based on the 1990 autobiography Proved Innocent by Gerry Conlon. A co-production between Ireland, the United Kingdom, and the United States, it tells the story of the Guildford Four, four people falsely convicted of the 1974 Guildford pub bombings that killed four off-duty British soldiers and a civilian.

The film received positive reviews from critics and grossed $65.8 million at the box office against a $13 million budget. It was nominated for seven Oscars at the 66th Academy Awards, including Best Actor (Daniel Day-Lewis), Best Supporting Actor (Pete Postlethwaite), Best Supporting Actress (Emma Thompson), Best Director, and Best Picture.

== Plot ==
In 1974, a Belfast burglar named Gerry Conlon is mistaken for an IRA sniper by British security forces and pursued until a riot breaks out. Gerry is sent to London by his father Giuseppe to discourage an IRA reprisal against him. While he is taking drugs in a park with his friend Paul Hill and homeless Irishman Charlie Burke, an explosion in Guildford kills four off-duty soldiers and a civilian and injures sixty-five more people.

Gerry is later arrested in Belfast by the British Army and Royal Ulster Constabulary and charged with terrorism. He is flown to England and incarcerated with his friend Paul and two others. The so-called Guildford Four are tortured by police as part of their interrogation. Gerry makes a forced confession after police threaten to kill his father, who is arrested with other members of the Conlon family, later dubbed the Maguire Seven. Gerry's defence points out numerous inconsistencies in the police investigation at trial but the Guildford Four and Maguire Seven are all sentenced to life imprisonment in 1975.

Gerry and Giuseppe are informed by fellow inmate Joe McAndrew that he admitted to police he committed the bombing, but the police withheld the confession to save face. Initially warm to Joe, Gerry's opinion changes when Joe sets a hated prison guard on fire during a riot. After Giuseppe dies in custody from tuberculosis in 1980, Gerry takes over his father's campaign for justice.

Giuseppe's lawyer Gareth Peirce discovers vital evidence related to Gerry's original alibi with a note attached that reads: "Not to be shown to the defence." In 1989, a statement made by Charlie Burke at a court appeal exonerates Gerry and the other wrongfully convicted defendants.

The film describes the lives of the wrongfully convicted after release and notes the police investigators were never prosecuted for misconduct. Giuseppe's burial plot in Belfast's Milltown Cemetery is revealed, and it is stated that the perpetrators of the Guildford Bombing were never criminally charged.

== Cast ==
- Daniel Day-Lewis as Gerard Patrick "Gerry" Conlon
- Pete Postlethwaite as Patrick "Giuseppe" Conlon
- Emma Thompson as Gareth Peirce
- John Lynch as Paul Hill
- Corin Redgrave as Inspector Robert Dixon
- Beatie Edney as Carole Richardson
- John Benfield as Chief PO Barker
- Paterson Joseph as Benbay
- Marie Jones as Sarah Conlon
- Gerard McSorley as Detective Pavis
- Frank Harper as Ronnie Smalls
- Mark Sheppard as Patrick Joseph "Paddy" Armstrong
- Don Baker as Joe McAndrew
- Tom Wilkinson as an Appeal Prosecutor
- Anthony Brophy as Danny

== Production ==
To prepare for the role of Gerry Conlon, Day-Lewis lost over 23 kilograms (50 lb) in weight. To gain an insight into Conlon's thoughts and feelings at the time, Day-Lewis also spent three days and nights in a jail cell. He was prevented from sleeping by a group of thugs, who would bang on the door every ten minutes with tin cups through the night, then he was interrogated by three different teams of real Special Branch officers for nine hours. He would also insist that crew members throw cold water at him and verbally abuse him. He also kept his Belfast accent on and off set.

Day-Lewis has stated in an interview that he went through all this because otherwise "How could I understand how an innocent man could sign that confession and destroy his own life."

=== Filming locations ===
The film was shot primarily in Ireland.

- South Lotts, Dublin, Ireland (used for opening Belfast scenes)
- Sheriff Street, Dublin, Ireland (Sheriff Street flats complex (now demolished) used for riot scene)
- Kilmainham Gaol, Dublin, Ireland (as Park Royal Prison)
- Liverpool, England (used for many London scenes)
- Manchester Town Hall, Manchester, England (Courtyard used for external scenes of The Old Bailey)

=== Soundtrack ===
Professional ratings
Review scores
Source	Rating
AllMusic	2/5 stars
Billboard	(favorable)
Music Week	3/5 stars

The soundtrack of the film includes the song "You Made Me the Thief of Your Heart", performed by Sinéad O'Connor and written by Bono, Gavin Friday, and Maurice Seezer. The soundtrack also includes "Voodoo Child (Slight Return)" performed by The Jimi Hendrix Experience. However, the Bob Dylan Song "Like a Rolling Stone" was not included on the album due to licensing restrictions.

The soundtrack featured these songs:

1. Bono and Gavin Friday – "In the Name of the Father" (5:42)
2. The Jimi Hendrix Experience – "Voodoo Child (Slight Return)" (5:09)
3. Bono and Gavin Friday – "Billy Boola" (3:45)
4. The Kinks – "Dedicated Follower of Fashion" (3:00)
5. Trevor Jones – "Interrogation" (7:11)
6. Bob Marley and the Wailers – "Is This Love" (3:51)
7. Trevor Jones – "Walking the Circle" (4:42)
8. Thin Lizzy – "Whiskey in the Jar" (5:44)
9. Trevor Jones – "Passage of Time" (5:52)
10. Sinéad O'Connor – "You Made Me the Thief of Your Heart" (6:21)

== Reception ==
=== Critical response ===
The film received very positive reviews from most critics. The review aggregator website Rotten Tomatoes gave the film a score of 94% based on 49 reviews, with an average rating of 7.80/10. The site's consensus states: "Impassioned and meticulously observed, In the Name of the Father mines rousing drama from a factual miscarriage of justice, aided by scorching performances and director Jim Sheridan's humanist focus." On Metacritic, the film has a score of 84 out of 100 based on 16 reviews indicating "universal acclaim". Audiences polled by CinemaScore gave the film an average grade of "A" on an A+ to F scale.

The film was the second highest-grossing ever in Ireland (behind Jurassic Park), and the highest-grossing Irish film, beating the record set by The Commitments in 1991, with a gross of IR£2.91 million ($4.5 million).

=== Year-end lists ===
- 2nd – James Berardinelli, ReelViews
- Top 10 (not ranked) – Dennis King, Tulsa World
- Honorable mention – Dan Craft, The Pantagraph

=== Accolades ===
Award	Category	Subject	Result
Australian Film Institute Awards	Best Foreign Film	Jim Sheridan	Nominated
Academy Awards	Best Picture	Jim Sheridan	Nominated
Academy Awards	Best Director	Jim Sheridan	Nominated
Academy Awards	Best Adapted Screenplay	Jim Sheridan	Nominated
Academy Awards	Best Adapted Screenplay	Terry George	Nominated
Academy Awards	Best Actor	Daniel Day-Lewis	Nominated
Academy Awards	Best Supporting Actor	Pete Postlethwaite	Nominated
Academy Awards	Best Supporting Actress	Emma Thompson	Nominated
Academy Awards	Best Film Editing	Gerry Hambling	Nominated
ACE Eddie	Best Edited Feature Film – Dramatic	Gerry Hambling	Nominated
British Academy Film Awards	Best Adapted Screenplay	Jim Sheridan	Nominated
British Academy Film Awards	Best Adapted Screenplay	Terry George	Nominated
British Academy Film Awards	Best Actor	Daniel Day-Lewis	Nominated
Berlin International Film Festival	Golden Bear	Jim Sheridan	Won
BSFC Award	Best Actor	Daniel Day-Lewis	Won
DFWFCA Award	Best Film		Nominated
David di Donatello Awards	Best Foreign Actor	Daniel Day-Lewis	Nominated
David di Donatello Awards	Best Foreign Film	Jim Sheridan	Won
European Film Award	European Film of the Year	Jim Sheridan	Nominated
Evening Standard British Film Award	Best Film	Jim Sheridan	Won
Golden Globe Awards	Best Motion Picture – Drama	Jim Sheridan	Nominated
Golden Globe Awards	Best Actor – Motion Picture Drama	Daniel Day-Lewis	Nominated
Golden Globe Awards	Best Supporting Actress – Motion Picture	Emma Thompson	Nominated
Golden Globe Awards	Best Original Song ("You Made Me the Thief of Your Heart")	Bono	Nominated
Golden Globe Awards	Best Original Song ("You Made Me the Thief of Your Heart")	Gavin Friday	Nominated
Golden Globe Awards	Best Original Song ("You Made Me the Thief of Your Heart")	Maurice Seezer	Nominated
Humanitas Prize	Feature Film Category	Terry George	Nominated
Humanitas Prize	Feature Film Category	Jim Sheridan	Nominated
Nastro d'Argento	European Silver Ribbon	Jim Sheridan	Nominated
Kansas City Film Critics Circle Awards	Best Supporting Actress	Emma Thompson	Won
LAFCA Award	Best Actor	Daniel Day-Lewis	2nd place
NBR Award	Top Ten Films		Won
NSFC Award	Best Actor	Daniel Day-Lewis	2nd place
NYFCC Award	Best Actor	Daniel Day-Lewis	3rd place
PGA Award	Best Theatrical Motion Picture	Jim Sheridan	Nominated
PFS Award	Exposé		Won
PFS Award	Human Rights		Nominated
PFS Award	Peace		Nominated
WGA Award	Best Adapted Screenplay	Jim Sheridan	Nominated
WGA Award	Best Adapted Screenplay	Terry George	Nominated

== Historicity ==
Upon its release, the film proved controversial for some historical inaccuracies and for fictionalising parts of the story. Jim Sheridan defended his choices in 2003, stating: "I was accused of lying in In the Name of the Father, but the real lie was saying it was a film about the Guildford Four when really it was about a non-violent parent." In the film Gerry and his father Giuseppe (in the closing credits,as well as in the English subtitles, the name is misspelled "Guiseppe") share a cell, but this never took place; they were usually kept in separate prisons. The real perpetrators of the Guildford pub bombings were the IRA's Balcombe Street Gang, who admitted to the Guildford and Woolwich bombings during their trials, rather than the fictional character of Joe McAndrew. The courtroom scenes featuring Gareth Peirce were also heavily criticised as clearly straying from recorded events and established English legal practices since, as a solicitor and not a barrister, she would not have been able to appear in court at the time. Furthermore, Peirce did not represent Giuseppe Conlon. Investigative journalist David Pallister wrote: "The myriad absurdities in the court scenes, straight out of LA Law, are inexcusable."

In a 1994 radio interview, Anne Maguire, a member of The Maguire Seven who, along with her husband, brother and two young sons, went to prison because of the false confessions of her nephew Gerry Conlon and Paul Hill, revealed her lingering anger and bitterness at the pair for wrongly incriminating them, as well as her dismay at the film for, in her view, depicting Conlon as a hero. (She and her family were all officially exonerated by the British government in 1991.) She also criticised director Jim Sheridan for, as she claims, never reaching out to her or her family for their side of the story, and sharply castigated the film for alleged inaccuracies, including a scene showing Conlon and Hill visiting her prior to their arrests, as she adamantly maintains that Hill never once set foot in her home—a key point in her defence at trial.

== See also ==
- Birmingham Six
- London in film
- List of 1990s films based on actual events
- List of films featuring hallucinogens
- The Troubles in film and television
