= John Cvitanovich =

Canadian football player

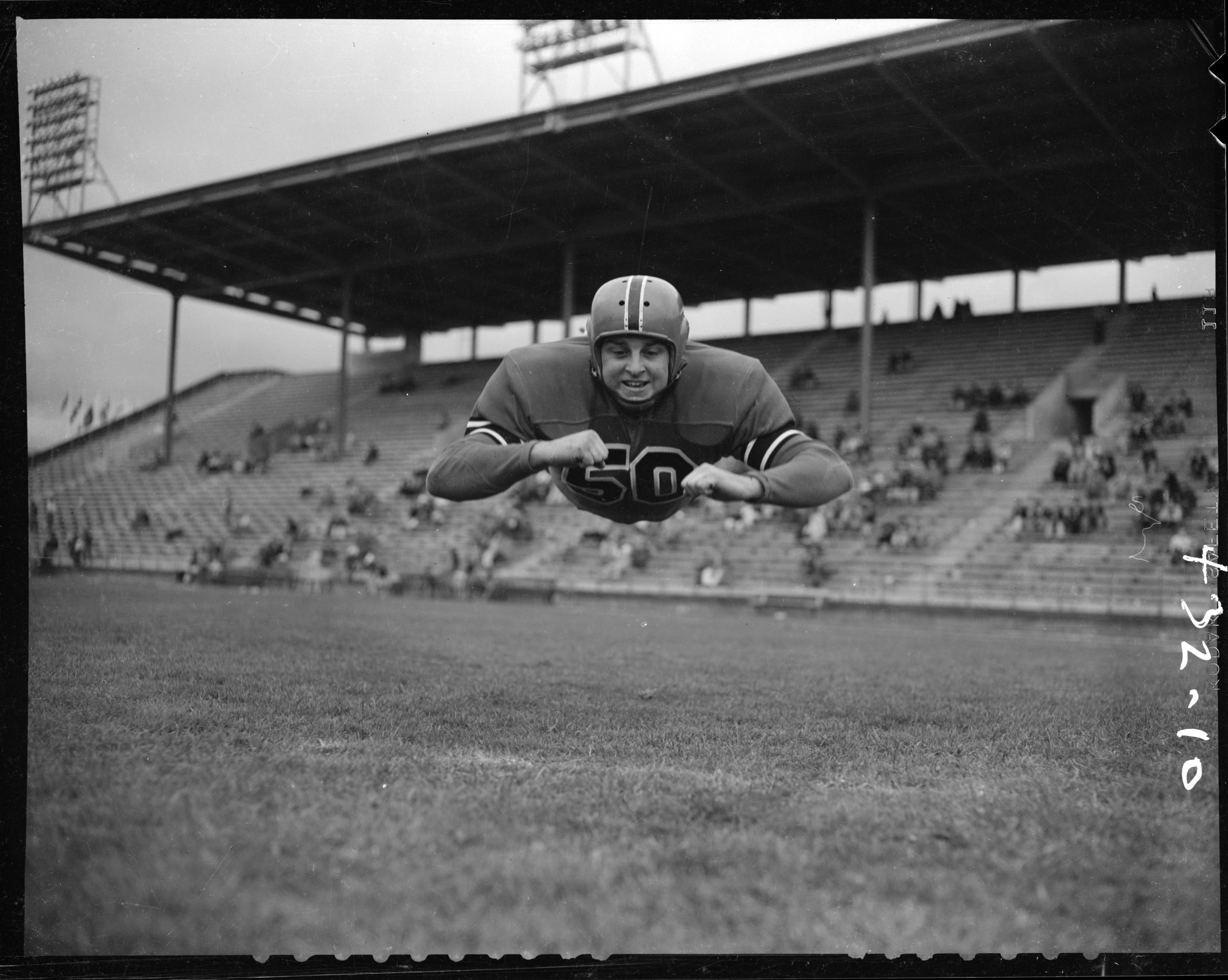

Profile
- Position: Center

Personal information
- Born: July 16, 1930; Split, Yugoslavia
- Died: January 8, 2002 (aged 71); Vancouver, British Columbia, Canada
- Listed height: 6 ft 4 in (1.93 m)
- Listed weight: 222 lb (101 kg)

Career history
- 1954–1955: BC Lions

John Alexander Cvitanovich (July 16, 1930 – January 8, 2002) was a Canadian professional football player who played for the BC Lions. He was a chartered accountant after retiring from professional football.
