= Gareth Peirce =

British solicitor and human rights activist

- Born: Jean Margaret Webb; March 1940 (age 86); Cheltenham, England
- Education: University of Oxford and London School of Economics
- Occupation: Solicitor
- Spouse: Chamberlain Peirce
- Children: 2

Gareth Peirce (born Jean Margaret Webb; March 1940) is a British solicitor and human rights activist. She has worked on a number of high-profile cases involving allegations of human rights injustices. Her work with Gerry Conlon and the Guildford Four – wrongly convicted of bombings carried out by the Provisional Irish Republican Army – was chronicled in the film In the Name of the Father (1993), in which she was portrayed by Emma Thompson.

== Early life ==
Peirce was born in March 1940 in Cheltenham, Gloucestershire, the daughter of Margaret (née Twidell) and John Le Plastrier Webb. She changed her name from Jean to Gareth during her formative years but never divulged to anyone the reason for doing so. Her parents ran Bentham Grammar School in North Yorkshire, which she attended until she took her O-levels. She was subsequently educated at the Cheltenham Ladies' College, the University of Oxford and the London School of Economics.

== Career ==
In the 1960s she worked as a journalist in the United States, following the campaign of Rev. Martin Luther King Jr. She married, returned to Britain in 1970 with her husband and son and undertook her postgraduate law degree at the London School of Economics. Her younger son was born in London after her permanent return to England.

In 1974 she joined the law firm of the solicitor Benedict Birnberg as a trainee, being admitted to the Roll of Solicitors on 15 December 1978. Following Birnberg's retirement in 1999, she continued to work as a senior partner of Birnberg Peirce and Partners.

In the mid-1970s she supported specific campaigns for legal reforms of police procedures that permitted the prosecution and conviction of persons based solely on identification evidence. Individual cases then very much in the news led to the establishment of Justice Against the Identification Laws (JAIL), an organisation Peirce supports.

During her career she represented Judith Ward, who had been wrongfully convicted in 1974 of several IRA-related bombings, the Guildford Four, the Birmingham Six, several mineworkers after the Battle of Orgreave, the family of Jean Charles de Menezes and Moazzam Begg, a man held in extrajudicial detention by the American government.

Of her defence of Muslim suspects accused of terrorism Peirce has said:

We have lost our way in this country. We have entered a new dark age of injustice and it is frightening that we are overwhelmed by it. I know I am representing innocent people; innocent people who know that a jury they face will inevitably be predisposed to find them guilty.

Julian Assange, the founder of WikiLeaks, appointed Peirce as his solicitor in Assange v Swedish Prosecution Authority. She was among the doctors and lawyers who were spied on by UC Global while visiting Assange at the Ecuadorian embassy. Santiago Pedraz, the Audiencia Nacional judge who is overseeing the case against UC Global's David Morales, issued court orders requesting permission of UK authorities to take witness testimony from Peirce and others.

== Recognition and reception ==
Peirce's role in the defence of the Guildford Four was dramatised in the 1993 film In the Name of the Father, with Peirce portrayed by Emma Thompson.

She was appointed Commander of the Order of the British Empire (CBE) in the 1999 New Year Honours for services to justice, but later wrote to Downing Street asking for it to be withdrawn and tendering an apology for any misunderstanding.

Sir Ludovic Kennedy, a campaigner against miscarriages of justice, dedicated a book to Peirce, calling her "the doyenne of British defence lawyers" who "refuses to be defeated in any case no matter how unfavourable it looks". Benedict Birnberg, who first employed her as a solicitor, believes she has "transformed the criminal justice scene in this country almost single-handedly".

Peirce was one of the initial eight individuals inducted in March 2007 into Justice Denied magazine's Hall of Honor for her lifetime achievement in aiding the wrongly convicted.

In 1999 she was awarded an honorary doctorate by NUI Galway.

In 2015 she was awarded the Presidential Distinguished Service Award by Michael D. Higgins, the President of Ireland.

== Personal life ==
Peirce has been described as a very private person who shuns the limelight and refuses media interviews. She lives in Kentish Town, north London, with her husband, Mellen Chamberlain "Bill" Peirce, a writer and photographer, son of American painter Waldo Peirce. They have two sons.

== Bibliography ==
=== As author ===
- Dispatches from the Dark Side: On Torture and the Death of Justice. London: Verso. 2010. ISBN 978-1-844-67619-4.

=== As contributor ===
- Coates, Ken, ed. (2009). Tskhinvali: Shock and Awe. Nottingham: Bertrand Russell Peace Foundation. ISBN 978-0-851-24757-1.
