= 14 Maiden Lane =

Building in Manhattan, New York

Diamond Exchange
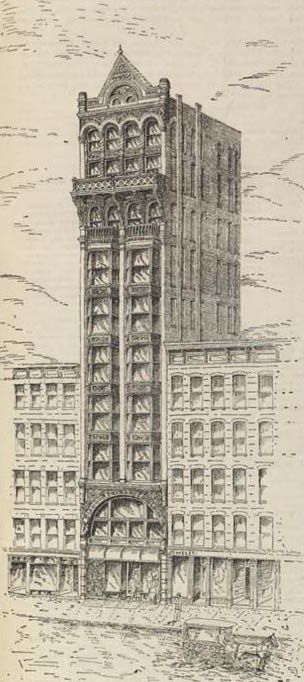
- 1894 rendering from Real Estate Record and Builders' Guide

- Location within Manhattan

General information
- Type: Residential (formerly offices)
- Location: 14 Maiden Lane, New York, United States
- Coordinates: 40°42′33″N 74°00′34″W
- Construction started: 1893
- Construction stopped: 1894
- Cost: $275,000

Height
- Height: 120 feet (37 m)

Technical details
- Structural system: Wall-braced cage
- Material: Steel, iron and brick
- Floor count: 10
- Lifts/elevators: 1

Design and construction
- Architect: Gilbert A. Schellenger
- Developer: Boehm & Coon

14 Maiden Lane, or the Diamond Exchange, is an early example of a New York skyscraper in what is now the Financial District of Manhattan. Completed in 1894, it is still standing.

== History ==
At the end of the 19th and beginning of the 20th centuries, the area around Maiden Lane and John Street became home to a number of early skyscrapers built speculatively to house businesses attracted to the booming financial district, which was expanding north. Maiden Lane was already established as the center of the city's jewelry district as early as 1795, and the area near Broadway was a busy shopping district. In 1892, Manhattan real-estate developers Abraham Boehm and Lewis Coon announced that they had acquired the property at 14 Maiden Lane and intended to demolish the existing structure, replacing it with a ten-story tower specifically intended for the diamond trade. At the time, the planned building would be among the tallest in the city, as elevators and new building techniques permitted ever higher construction and the city's rapid growth created an insatiable real-estate market.

== Design and construction ==
Boehm and Coon hired prolific New York City architect Gilbert A. Schellenger to design the building for the specific requirements of diamond merchants and jewelers. The building was of fireproof construction, with a cast-iron and steel frame, and hollow-brick floor arches. The frame and floors were made unusually strong in order to accommodate the heavy safes required by the trade, large windows provided ample daylight, augmented by gas and electric lights, and the facade was ornately decorated. Constrained by the narrow 23.5 foot (7.2 m) lot, Schellenger emphasized the building's slenderness with three slim brick colonnettes flanking the large bay windows on the building's face. The tall, narrow building towered over the older, neighboring structures.

Cast-iron and steel construction were both relatively new techniques, and construction of the Diamond Exchange suffered a major setback in October 1893 when a powerful windstorm caused the incomplete cage to shift about 10 inches (250 mm) from plumb. The problem was eventually traced back to oversized holes in splices on the cast-iron columns. Each new story added to the cage permitted additional movement, and the force of the wind was sufficient to cause the whole structure to tilt. To resolve the problem, the builders were forced to install "knee braces" at the ceiling line of each story, converting the original unbraced cage to a braced design. In 1904 the same flaw led to the collapse of the eleven-story Darlington Hotel, also in New York, which killed 25 construction workers.

Construction was completed in 1894 and the building was occupied by jewelers and diamond dealers. One year after it was completed, the developers sold the building for $375,000 (it had cost approximately $275,000 to build). The ground floor, decorated in polished granite, was leased to retail tenants; in 1915 it became home to Tessaro's, a dealer in rare books.

== Fate ==
While many early skyscrapers have been demolished or dwarfed by modern neighbors, the Diamond Exchange, as of 2022, still stands above the adjacent buildings. In 1920, the buildings to the east were destroyed in a fire which killed several people. The buildings to the west were demolished in 2015 to make way for a planned hotel. As of 2024 Maiden Lane 8-12 remains an empty lot.

By 2001 the building had been converted to residential use with one large apartment on each floor. In January 2022, it was sold for $9.5 million and the remaining tenants, mostly artists, were evicted.
