= Guildford Four and Maguire Seven =

People wrongly convicted of terrorism

The Guildford Four and Maguire Seven were two groups of people, mostly from Northern Ireland, who were wrongly convicted in English courts in 1975 and 1976 of the Guildford pub bombings of 5 October 1974 and the Woolwich pub bombing of 7 November 1974. All the convictions were eventually overturned in 1989 (for the Guildford Four) and 1991 (for the Maguire Seven) after long campaigns for justice, as were those of the Birmingham Six.

== Background ==
On 22 October 1975, at the Old Bailey in London, the Guildford Four were convicted of bombings carried out by the Provisional Irish Republican Army (IRA). Subsequently, the Maguire Seven were convicted of handling explosives found during the investigation into the bombings. Both groups' convictions were eventually declared "unsafe and unsatisfactory" and reversed in 1989 and 1991, respectively, after they had served 15 to 16 years in prison.

Along with the Guildford Four and Maguire Seven, several other people faced charges relating to the bombings, six of whom were charged with murder, but these charges were dropped.

In the wake of the scandal, in October 1989 the UK Government appointed Appeal Court Justice Sir John May to undertake a judicial inquiry into the suspect convictions of the Guildford Four and Maguire Seven. The inquiry's findings criticised the trial judge, Lord Donaldson of Lymington. It unearthed improprieties in the handling of scientific evidence that were relevant to the other cases and declared the convictions unsound and recommended referral back to the Court of Appeal, but no action was taken.

No one else has been charged with the Guildford and Woolwich bombings, or with supplying the material. Three police officers were charged with conspiracy to pervert the course of justice in the wake of the inquiry, but found not guilty in 1993.

Over 700 documents, including secret testimony, were collected by the inquiry and were due to be unsealed for public access in The National Archives on 1 January 2020, but on 31 December 2019 the Home Office removed all the documents from the National Archive and took them back into government control. The files remain sealed for now.

== Guildford Four ==
The Guildford Four were charged with direct involvement with the IRA attacks. They were:

Defendant	Age at time of trial	Convicted of
Paul Michael Hill	21	Guildford pub bombings; Woolwich pub bombing; (separately) the murder of British soldier Brian Shaw, confessed to during the same questioning
Gerard Patrick "Gerry" Conlon	21	Guildford pub bombings
Patrick Joseph "Paddy" Armstrong	25	Guildford pub bombings; Woolwich bombing
Carole Richardson	17	Guildford pub bombings

After their arrest, all four defendants confessed to the bombing under intense police interrogation. These confessions were later retracted but remained the basis of the case against them. They were later alleged to be the result of coercion by the police, ranging from intimidation to torture—including threats against family members—as well as the effects of drug withdrawal. Conlon wrote in his autobiography that a key factor in his coerced confession was that anti-terrorism laws passed in the early 1970s allowed the police to hold suspects without charges for up to a week, and that he might have been able to withstand the treatment he had received had a shorter time limit been in effect.

The four were convicted on 22 October 1975 of murder and other crimes and sentenced to life imprisonment—mandatory for adults convicted of murder. Richardson, a minor at the time of the bombings, received an indeterminate "at Her Majesty's pleasure" sentence for murder and a life sentence for conspiracy. Justice Lord Donaldson of Lymington, who also presided over the Maguire Seven trial, expressed regret that the Four had not been charged with high treason, which still had a mandatory death penalty. Although no hangings had been carried out in the UK since 1964, treason still carried the death penalty until 1998. The usual practice was for judges to be consulted by the Home Secretary when considering release from a life sentence, rather than giving a tariff at trial, but the judge, believing he might be dead by the time they were released, recommended 30 years for Conlon, 35 for Armstrong, and until "great age" for Hill.

The Guildford Four did not "fit the bill" of IRA involvement according to the way they lived. Paddy Armstrong and Carole Richardson, an Englishwoman, lived in a squat and were involved with drugs and petty crime. Conlon asserted at several points in his autobiography that the IRA would not have taken him due to his record for shoplifting and other petty crimes, and that he had been expelled from Fianna Éireann, an Irish republican youth organisation with strong ties to the Provisional IRA.

== Maguire Seven ==
The Maguire Seven were charged with possessing nitroglycerine allegedly passed to the IRA to make bombs after the police raided the West Kilburn house of Anne Maguire (Conlon's aunt) on 3 December 1974.

They were tried and convicted on 4 March 1976 and received the following sentences:

Defendant	Relationship	Age at time of trial	Sentence
Anne Maguire		40	14 years
Patrick Maguire Sr.	Anne's husband	42	14 years
Patrick Maguire Jr.	Son of Anne and Patrick	14	4 years
Vincent Maguire	Son of Anne and Patrick	17	5 years
Sean Smyth	Brother of Anne Maguire	37	12 years
Patrick O'Neill	Family friend	35	12 years
Patrick "Giuseppe" Conlon	Brother-in-law of Anne	52	12 years; died in prison in 1980

Giuseppe Conlon had travelled from Belfast to help his son, Gerry Conlon, in the Guildford Four trial. Giuseppe, who had troubles with his lungs for many years, died in prison in January 1980, while the other six served their sentences and were released.

== Appeals ==
The Guildford Four and the Maguire Seven sought leave to appeal their convictions immediately and were refused, but a growing body of disparate groups pressed for reexamination of the case.

In February 1977, during the trial of the Balcombe Street ASU, the four IRA men instructed their lawyers to "draw attention to the fact that four totally innocent people were serving massive sentences", referring to the Guildford Four. Despite telling the police they were responsible, they were never charged with these offences and the Guildford Four remained in prison for another 12 years.

The Guildford Four tried to obtain from the Home Secretary a reference to the Court of Appeal under Section 17 of the Criminal Appeal Act 1968 (later repealed), but were unsuccessful. In 1987, the Home Office issued a memorandum recognising that it was unlikely they were terrorists, but that this would not be sufficient evidence for appeal.

=== Campaigns ===
After the 1977 court appeal failed, a number of 'lone voices' publicly questioned the conviction; among them were David Martin in The Leveller, Gavin Esler and Chris Mullin in the New Statesman, and David McKittrick in the Belfast Telegraph. On 26 February 1980, BBC One Northern Ireland aired Spotlight: Giuseppe Conlon and the Bomb Factory, which contained an interview by Patrick Maguire and the BBC's Gavin Esler.

=== Quashing of the Guildford Four verdict ===
In 1989, detectives from Avon and Somerset Constabulary, investigating the handling of the case, found significant pieces of evidence in relation to Surrey Police's handling of the Guildford Four and their statements. Typed notes from Patrick Armstrong's police interviews had been extensively edited. Deletions and additions had been made and the notes had been rearranged. The notes and their amendments were consistent with handwritten and typed notes presented at the trial, which suggested that the handwritten notes were made after the interviews had been conducted. The notes presented had been described in court as contemporaneous records. Manuscript notes relating to an interview with Hill showed that Hill's fifth statement was taken in breach of Judges' Rules and may well have been inadmissible as evidence. The information was not made available to the DPP or the prosecution and the officers involved had denied under oath that such an interview had happened. Detention records were inconsistent with the times and durations of the claimed interviews, as reported by the Surrey police.

An appeal was already under way on the basis of other evidence. Lord Gifford represented Paul Hill, and others were represented by human rights solicitor Gareth Peirce. The appeal hearing had been adjourned to January 1990 at the request of the Guildford Four but once the findings of the Somerset and Avon report were available, the hearing was resumed, with the Crown saying it did not wish to support the convictions. The Lord Chief Justice, Lord Lane, concluded that, regardless of the impact of the content of the material Avon and Somerset discovered or the alibis or additional evidence the appellants wished to introduce, the level of duplicity meant that all the police evidence was suspect, and the case for the prosecution was unsafe.

Lane remarked:

We have no doubt that these events make the convictions of all of these four appellants in respect of the Guildford and the Woolwich events unsafe, even though the latest revelations have no direct bearing on the evidence relating to the Woolwich bombing.

The Four were released on 19 October 1989, after having their convictions quashed. Hill had also been convicted of the murder of a British soldier, Brian Shaw, based on his confession while in the custody of Surrey Police. This did not fall under the ambit of the Lane appeal, but he was released on bail pending his appeal against this conviction. In 1994, Her Majesty's Court of Appeal in Belfast quashed Hill's conviction for Shaw's murder.

=== Quashing of the Maguire verdicts ===
On 12 July 1990, the Home Secretary, David Waddington, published Interim Report on the Maguire Case: The Inquiry into the circumstances surrounding the convictions arising out of the bomb attacks in Guildford and Woolwich in 1974, which criticised the trial judge, Donaldson, unearthed improprieties in the handling of scientific evidence, declared the convictions unsound, and recommended referral back to the Court of Appeal. The report "strongly criticise[d] the decision by the prosecution at the Guildford Four's trial not to disclose to the defence a statement supporting Mr Conlon's alibi." The Maguire Seven's convictions were quashed in 1991.

== Aftermath ==
=== Guildford Four and Maguire Seven ===
Neither the bombings nor the wrongful imprisonment resulted in convictions. The bombings were most likely the work of the Balcombe Street ASU, which claimed responsibility. They were already serving life sentences, but were released under the terms of the Good Friday Agreement. Three British police officers—Thomas Style, John Donaldson and Vernon Attwell—were charged with conspiracy to pervert the course of justice, but each was found not guilty.

On 9 February 2005, Prime Minister Tony Blair apologised to the families of the 11 people imprisoned for the bombings in Guildford and Woolwich and those related to those who were still alive. He said, in part, "I am very sorry that they were subject to such an ordeal and injustice... they deserve to be completely and publicly exonerated."

The Roman Catholic Church awarded Anne Maguire a Benemerenti medal for her 'remarkable ability to forgive' and her community work. In 1993, Hill married Courtney Kennedy, a daughter of assassinated U.S. Senator Robert F. Kennedy and a niece of assassinated president John F. Kennedy. They had a daughter, Saoirse, in 1997. Paul had a daughter, Cara, from a previous relationship with Gina Tohill. Hill and Courtney Kennedy legally separated in 2006. Their daughter, Saoirse Kennedy Hill, died in 2019 at age 22, due to an accidental overdose.

Hill had a televised meeting with the brother of murdered soldier Brian Shaw, who continued to accuse him. He travelled to Colombia to attend the trial of the Colombia Three.

Gerry Conlon's autobiography Proved Innocent was adapted into the film In the Name of the Father, with actor Daniel Day-Lewis portraying Conlon. The film depicts Conlon's attempt to rebuild his shattered relationship with his father but is partly fictional; Conlon never shared a cell with his father. He is reported to have settled with the government for compensation in the region of £500,000. Conlon gave support to Tommy Sheridan in relation to the charges brought against him.

Sarah Conlon, who spent 16 years campaigning to have the names of her husband and son cleared and helped secure the apology, died on 20 July 2008.

Paddy Armstrong had problems with drinking and gambling. He eventually married and moved to Dublin. Carole Richardson married and had a daughter soon after her release. She kept out of the public eye and died in 2012 aged 55.

The autobiography of the youngest member of the Maguire Seven, Patrick Maguire, My Father's Watch: The Story of a Child Prisoner in 70s Britain, was released in 2008. It tells his story before, during, and after his imprisonment and details its impact on his life and those of his family.

Gerry Conlon later joined a campaign to free the "Craigavon Two", Brendan McConville and John Paul Wootton, convicted of the murder of a police officer in Northern Ireland.

Conlon died at home in Belfast on 21 June 2014. His family issued a statement: "He brought life, love, intelligence, wit and strength to our family through its darkest hours. He helped us to survive what we were not meant to survive. We recognise that what he achieved by fighting for justice for us had a far, far greater importance—it forced the world's closed eyes to be opened to injustice; it forced unimaginable wickedness to be acknowledged; we believe it changed the course of history".

Sir John Donaldson went on to an illustrious judicial career and became Master of the Rolls, Head of the Civil Division of the Court of Appeal. The appeal case itself for R v Maguire 1981, is now the leading case for disclosure to the defence. In 2018, the BBC broadcast the documentary A Great British Injustice: The Maguire Story, with the involvement of the Maguire family's surviving members.

=== Key prosecution figures ===
Many of the key figures in the British legal and criminal justice establishment who were responsible for the wrongful prosecution of the Guildford Four and Maguire Seven, while later facing public criticism, were never formally held accountable for their role in the scandal. In 2013, in what is believed to be the final media interview he gave before his premature death in 2014, Gerry Conlon told Italian documentary maker and photographer Lorenzo Moscia that every key British figure involved in his wrongful conviction had subsequently been promoted and reached the top of their respective profession. He contrasted this with the struggles and hardships he and the other wrongfully convicted people faced in the years after their release from prison.

==== Lord Justice Donaldson (trial judge) ====
Two months after Margaret Thatcher became British Prime Minister in 1979, the trial judge in the Guildford Four case, Lord Justice (John) Donaldson, was made a Lord Justice of Appeal and a Privy Counsellor. In 1982 he was appointed Master of the Rolls, the second-most-senior judicial office in England and Wales as head of the Civil Division of the Court of Appeal of England and Wales and Head of Civil Justice. In 1988 he was elevated to the House of Lords with a life peerage as Baron Donaldson of Lymington.

==== Sir Peter Imbert (Police investigator) ====
Peter Imbert, the then deputy head of the Metropolitan Police Anti-Terrorist Branch in 1974, was the police officer who oversaw the arrest and interrogation of the Guildford Four and Maguire Seven. Lord Chief Justice Lane later called this investigation "a sequence of false confessions and police deceits." In late 1975 Imbert led the police operation that saw the arrest of the IRA's Balcombe Street ASU, members of which later confessed to being the real bombers in Guildford and Woolwich, a fact Imbert knew.

In 1976 Imbert was appointed Assistant Chief Constable, and later Deputy Chief Constable of Surrey Constabulary (the police force that investigated the Guildford pub bombings). In 1979, he became Chief Constable of Thames Valley Police, the youngest Chief Constable in the country at that time. He returned to the Metropolitan Police as Assistant Commissioner in 1985, and in 1987 he was appointed Commissioner of the Met (the most senior police position in Britain) by the Conservative Home Secretary Douglas Hurd. Imbert retired from the police in 1992 and in was appointed Lord Lieutenant of Greater London from 1998 until 2008. He was appointed to the House of Lords as a life peer as Baron Imbert, of New Romney in the County of Kent in 1999, sitting as a crossbencher.

==== Sir Norman Skelhorn (Director of Public Prosecutions) ====
Sir Norman Skelhorn was the Director of Public Prosecutions in England and Wales in 1974 oversaw the Crown's prosecution of Guildford Four and Maguire Seven, as well as the prosecution of the Birmingham Six. Skelhorn had a chequered history in relation to prosecution of terrorist offences related to the Troubles. He became entangled in the row that erupted around the use of torture in Northern Ireland. Edward Heath, Prime Minister since 1970, had banned sensory deprivation in light of the report by Sir Edmund Compton into internment and interrogation techniques used by the British Army and the Royal Ulster Constabulary. In October 1973, while being questioned at a meeting of the Harvard Law School Forum, Skelhorn did not deny that torture had taken place. On the contrary, he stated that "when dealing with "Irish terrorists" any methods were justified." Skelhorn retired as DPP before the publication of the critical report by Lord Devlin published in 1977 recommended statutory prosecution safeguards but the Callaghan Government did nothing.

==== Lord (Michael) Havers (Prosecuting counsel) ====
British barrister and Conservative politician Sir Michael Havers MP, was selected by DPP Norman Skelhorn to lead both the prosecution of the Guildford Four and the Maguire Seven in 1974, and the Crown's case in opposing the subsequent appeals of both groups in the Court of Appeal.

Havers was from a distinguished legal family. His father was High Court judge Sir Cecil Havers, and his sister was Baroness Butler-Sloss who in 1988 became the first woman named to the Court of Appeal and later President of the Family Division. Sir Michael was the father of the well-known English actor Nigel Havers.

Havers was elected to the House of Commons in 1970 as Conservative MP for Wimbledon (a seat he held until 1987). He served as Solicitor General for England and Wales under Prime Minister Edward Heath from 1972 to 1974. By October 1974, with the Conservatives in opposition, Havers acted for the DPP in both prosecutions. In the case of the Guildford Four, the DPP was found to have suppressed alibi evidence that supported Gerry Conlon's and Paul Hill's claims of innocence. The DPP, for which Havers was acting, was also found to have suppressed confessions by Provisional IRA bombers in the Balcombe Street Gang, claiming responsibility for the Guildford and Woolwich bombings. While it was never directly shown that Havers knew of the evidence the DPP suppressed, many, including Labour MP Chris Mullin, cast doubt on his integrity in the matter in his submission to the May Inquiry into the wrongful convictions.

In 1977, Havers became a member of the Privy Council. In 1979, Thatcher reappointed him as Attorney General for England and Wales and as Attorney General for Northern Ireland. He held both posts until 1987. During the Falklands War in 1982, Havers was included in Thatcher's War Cabinet, to which he provided advice on international law and rules of engagement.

After Havers retired from the House of Commons in the 1987 UK general election, Thatcher appointed him Lord Chancellor, and he consequently became a life peer as Baron Havers, of St Edmundsbury in the County of Suffolk. At the time, this made him a senior Minister of the Crown, the most senior judicial officer holder in the UK, as well as presiding officer of the House of Lords.

== In popular culture ==
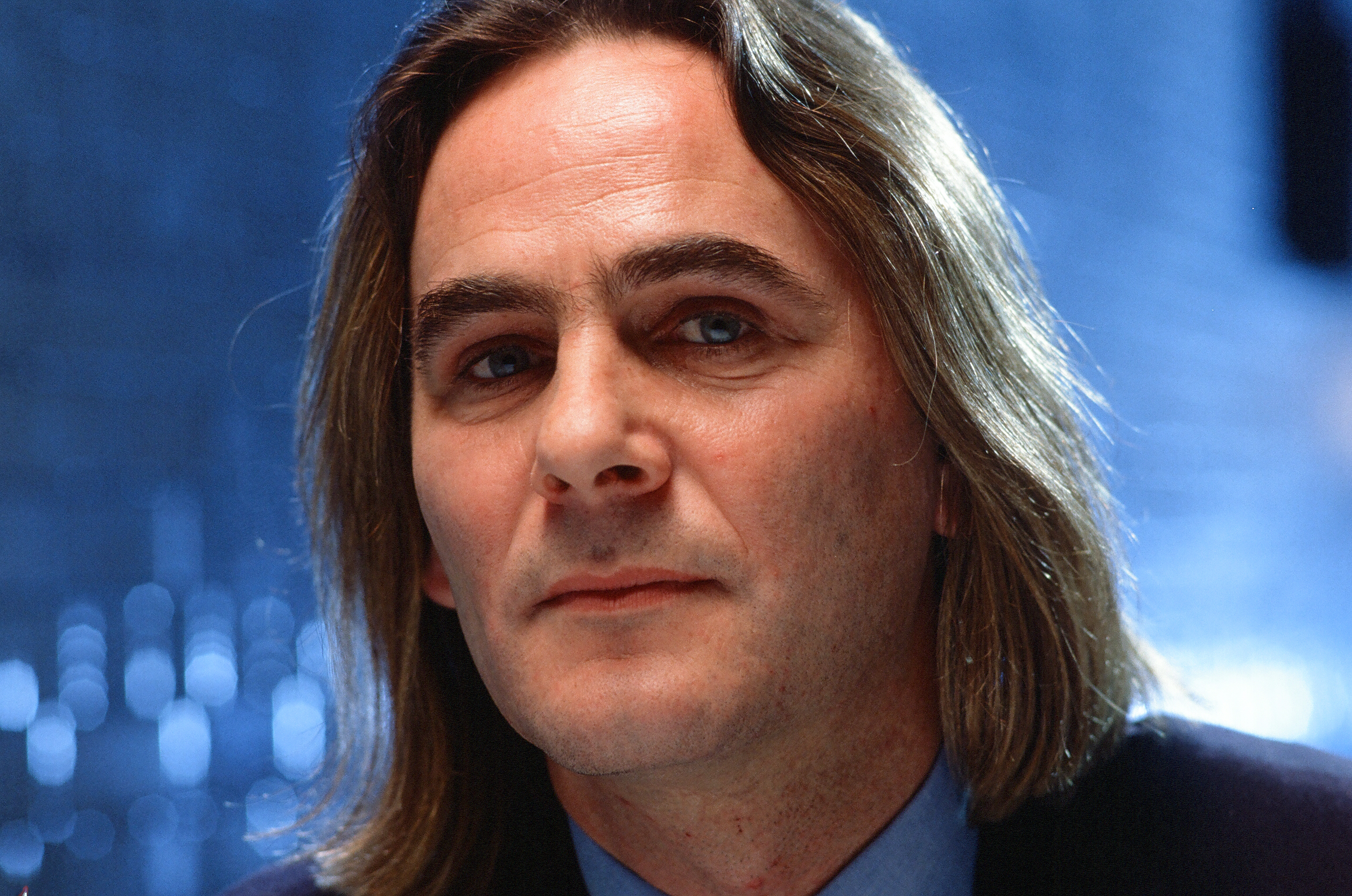
Paul Hill on Opinions in 1994

- In 1989 RTÉ aired Dear Sarah, a TV movie focusing on Sarah Conlon, Gerry Conlon and Giuseppe Conlon.
- In March 1991 Paul Hill appeared on the Channel 4 discussion programme After Dark with, among others, Patrick Cosgrave, J. P. Donleavy, David Norris, Emily O'Reilly and Francis Stuart.
- In May 1994 Paul Hill gave a half-hour Opinions lecture televised on Channel 4 and subsequently published in The Independent as "Prisoners on the Outside".
- The film In the Name of the Father starring Daniel Day-Lewis, Pete Postlethwaite and Emma Thompson was based on the story of the Guildford Four as well as Conlon's biography. The film was nominated for seven Academy Awards.
- The song "The Guildford Four" on the album Himself by Northern Irish singer-songwriter Andy White tells the story of their wrongful conviction. It was released in 1990 on Cooking Vinyl.

== See also ==
- Good Friday Agreement
- Birmingham Six
- Maamtrasna trial
