= Gerry Conlon =

Irishman wrongly convicted of terrorism

- Conlon outside the Court of Appeal at the time of his release
- Born: Gerard Patrick Conlon; 1 March 1954; Belfast, Northern Ireland
- Died: 21 June 2014 (aged 60); Belfast, Northern Ireland
- Criminal charge: Guildford pub bombings on 5 October 1974
- Criminal penalty: Convicted on 22 October 1975 and sentenced to life imprisonment
- Criminal status: Conviction quashed by Court of Appeal on 19 October 1989

Gerard Patrick Conlon (1 March 1954 – 21 June 2014) was an Irish man known for being one of the Guildford Four who spent 15 years in prison after being wrongly convicted of being a Provisional IRA bomber.

== Biography ==
Gerard Conlon was born in Belfast and grew up at 7 Peel Street on the corner of Mary Street in the impoverished but close-knit community of the Lower Falls Road. He described his childhood as happy. His father was Giuseppe Conlon, a factory worker, and his mother was Sarah Conlon, a hospital cleaner.

In 1974, at age 20, Conlon went to England to seek work and to escape the everyday violence he was encountering on the streets of Belfast. He was living with a group of squatters in London when he was arrested for the Guildford pub bombings, which occurred on 5 October 1974.

Conlon, along with fellow Irishmen Paul Michael Hill and Paddy Armstrong and Englishwoman Carole Richardson, known as the Guildford Four, were convicted on 22 October 1975 of planting two bombs a year earlier in the Surrey town of Guildford, which killed five people and injured dozens more. The four were sentenced to life in prison. At their trial the judge, John Donaldson, told the defendants, "If hanging were still an option you would have been executed."

Conlon continued to protest his innocence, insisting that police had tortured him into making a false confession. On 19 October 1989, his position was vindicated when the Guildford Four were freed after the Court of Appeal in London ruled that police had fabricated the handwritten interrogation notes used in the conviction. Crucial evidence proving Conlon could not have carried out the bombings had been held back by the police from the original trial. Most notably, the police falsely claimed that they had been unable to locate Charles Burke, a homeless man with whom Conlon had been using drugs in a local park at the time of the bombings.

A group of Conlon's relatives, collectively known as the Maguire Seven, were convicted of being part of the bombing campaign and also spent up to 14 years in prison. Among them was his father, Giuseppe, who had travelled to London from Belfast to help his son mount a legal defence, and who died in prison in 1980. In 1991, the Maguire Seven were also exonerated. By this time they had all either served their prison sentences in full or, in the case of Giuseppe Conlon, died. Scientists had falsely asserted that the hands of each defendant had tested positive for nitroglycerine.

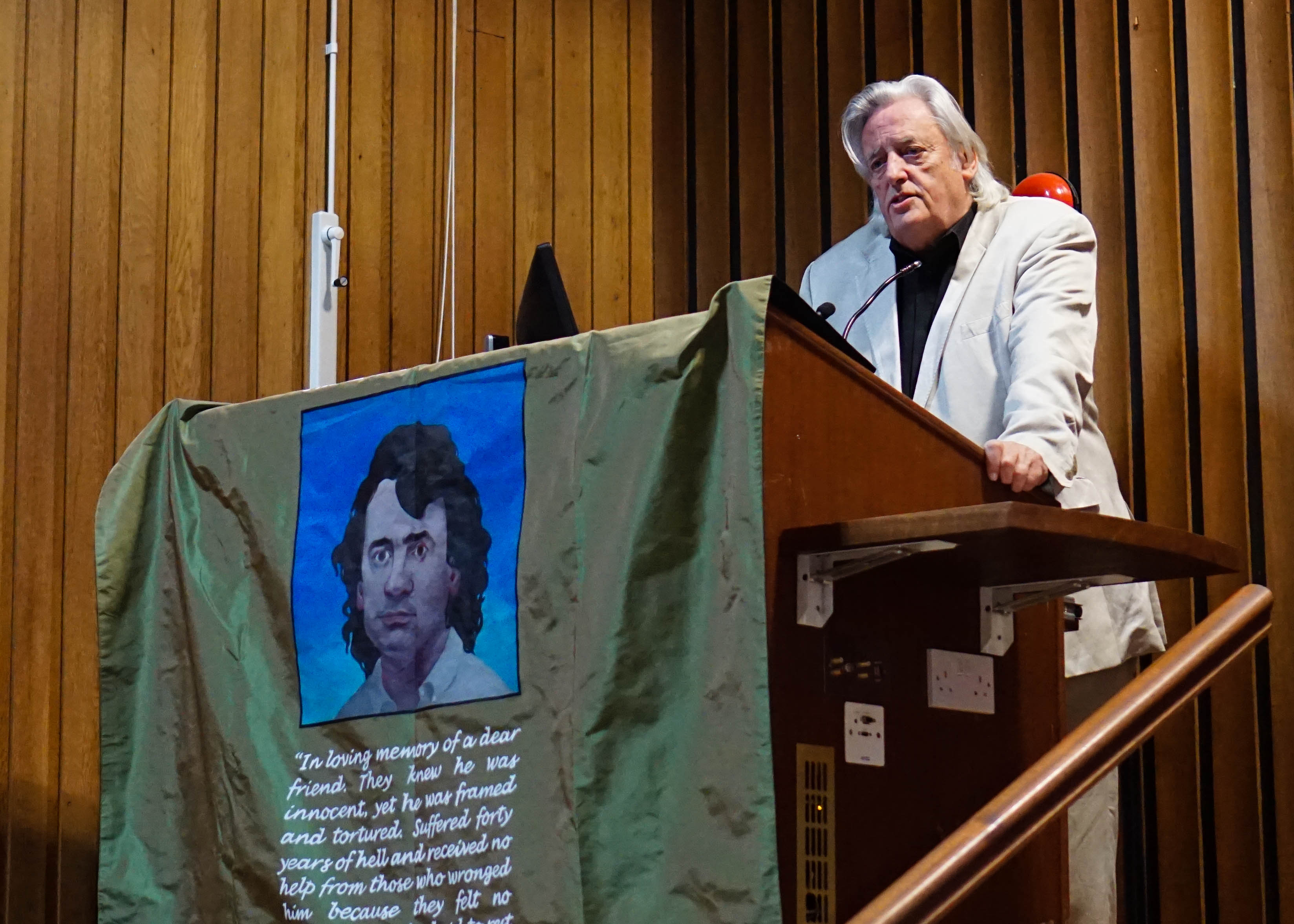
Michael Mansfield QC gives the first Gerry Conlon Memorial Lecture at St. Mary's College Belfast in January 2015

After emerging from the Court of Appeal as a free man, Conlon said: "I have been in prison for something I did not do. I am totally innocent. The Maguire Seven are innocent. Let's hope the Birmingham Six are freed". Conlon was represented by human rights lawyer Gareth Peirce, who also secured the release of the Birmingham Six.

Conlon described his experience of injustice in his book Proved Innocent (1990). He was portrayed by Daniel Day-Lewis in the 1993 film In the Name of the Father.

After his release from prison, Conlon had problems adjusting to civilian life, suffering two nervous breakdowns, attempting suicide, and becoming addicted to alcohol and other drugs. He eventually recovered and became a campaigner against various miscarriages of justice in the United Kingdom and around the world. Gerry Conlon also made a cameo appearance in the 1997 film Face alongside Robert Carlyle.

== Death ==
Conlon's grave in Milltown Cemetery, Belfast

Conlon died of lung cancer on 21 June 2014 in his native Belfast home, surrounded by family members. His funeral was held at St Peter's Cathedral in Belfast. The ceremony was presided over by Father Ciaran Dallat and saw the participation of the other members of the Guildford Four, the Maguire Seven, Irish Tánaiste Eamon Gilmore and Conlon's former lawyer Gareth Peirce.
