= Frank Cvitanovich =

Canadian documentary film maker (1927–1995)

Frank Cvitanovich (14 August 1927 – 12 August 1995) was a Canadian documentary film maker, who made much of his best work for British television.

== Early years ==
Cvitanovich was born in Vancouver, the son of a Croat immigrant. His father founded his own salmon fishing fleet and his son worked for him as an apprentice, before trying his hand as a poker player, theatre hand, film runner and professional American footballer. A severe knee injury ended his gridiron career in California, but Cvitanovich convinced the makers of Gene Autry's television series The Singing Cowboy that he could direct. He made a further 31 episodes in Hollywood, before moving to London in the mid-1950s and setting up his own film company. In 1970 Cvitanovich was the co-director of Festival Express. A documentary account of a five-day Canadian rock tour, that took several influential bands across Canada by train, it was finally released with contemporary interview footage in 2003.

== Thames Television ==
Cvitanovich's greatest work was for Thames Television during the 1970s, under the enlightened reign of Director of Programmes Jeremy Isaacs. With his then partner, Midge Mackenzie, his first film for Thames was Bunny (1972), a moving account of the treatment given to the couple's own brain-damaged son in a Philadelphia clinic. The film won an International Emmy. Cvitanovich loved sport - especially the Dallas Cowboys - and his very first documentary was a study of a baseball player in decline. For Thames he made films about motorcycle champion Barry Sheene, the footballing Charlton Brothers and Saturday’s Heroes (1976) about life behind the scenes at Tottenham Hotspur F.C. Other subjects included a day in the life of an East End park, and The Kilnsey Show about a Yorkshire wall-building competition. Yorkshire was also the setting for Bonny, Beauty, Daisy, Violet, Grace and Geoffrey Morton (1974), which won a BAFTA and several other awards.

In 1981 Cvitanovich won a Jacob's Award for Murphy's Stroke, his TV film based on the Gay Future betting coup.

== Private life ==
Cvitanovich was married five times. Apart from Midge Mackenzie, his wives included the TV presenter and journalist Janet Street-Porter. According to Street-Porter, he had an irrational fear of tomatoes.
