= 33rd International Film Festival of the Art of Cinematography Camerimage =

2025 edition of film festival

EnergaCAMERIMAGE 2025
- Official poster by Marek Żydowicz and Nadia Kasprowicz.
- Opening film: Anemone
- Location: Toruń, Poland
- Founded: 1993
- Awards: Golden Frog: Late Shift – Judith Kaufmann; Silver Frog: Sound of Falling – Fabian Gamper; Bronze Frog: Chopin, a Sonata in Paris – Michał Sobociński
- Festival date: 15–22 November 2025
- Website: camerimage.pl/en/

Camerimage
- 2026 2024

The 33rd International Film Festival of the Art of Cinematography Camerimage, also named EnergaCAMERIMAGE 2025 for its sponsorship from Polish power company Energa, is took place from 15 to 22 November 2025 in Toruń, Poland, to recognize and reward the best in cinematography in film, television and music videos.

Ronan Day-Lewis directorial debut Anemone served as the festival's opening film. The Golden Frog went to Judith Kaufmann for her work in Petra Volpe's drama Late Shift. Fabian Gamper for Mascha Schilinski's Sound of Falling and Michał Sobociński for Michał Kwieciński's Chopin, a Sonata in Paris, received the Silver and Bronze Frog respectively.

== Background ==
Throughout October 2025, the films and projects included for each section were announced, with the full official lineup for the main competition being revealed on 29 October. Later, on 31 October, the psychological drama Anemone, directed by Ronan Day-Lewis with cinematography work done by Ben Fordesman, was announced as the opening film for the festival.

The festival's official poster was revealed on 25 August and features a magician taking a frog out of a hat, making reference to the festival's main award, the Golden Frog, which represents "a spark of a new idea, the seed of a story which, in the right hands, takes on form, colour, and true magic". Its concept was created by Marek Żydowicz with its visual framework developed by Nadia Kasprowicz.

Australian actress Cate Blanchett, who served as the jury president for the festival's previous edition, received the Icon Award, while American documentary filmmaker Liz Garbus was honored with the Award for Outstanding Achievements in Documentary Filmmaking. Australian actor Joel Edgerton received the Actor's Award.

The FilmLight Colour Awards, organized by FilmLight in association with Colorist Society International, recognized the best in colour grading across six juried categories whose winners were revealed on 16 November during the festival. The nominees were announced on 22 October. American cinematographer Bradford Young will serve as the jury president while South Korean filmmaker Park Chan-wook was announced as the jury guest of honor.

== Official selection ==
The films and projects selected for each announced section are as follows:

Highlighted title indicates section's Golden Frog winner.
Highlighted title indicates section's Silver Frog winner.
Highlighted title indicates section's Bronze Frog winner.

=== Main Competition ===
English Title	Original Title	Cinematographer(s)	Director(s)	Production countrie(s)
12 Paintings of Enslavement	12 obrazów zniewolenia	Lech Majewski, Paweł Tybora	Lech Majewski	Poland
Anemone (opening film)		Ben Fordesman	Ronan Day-Lewis	Switzerland, United Kingdom
Chopin, a Sonata in Paris	Chopin, Chopin!	Michał Sobociński	Michał Kwieciński	Poland, France, Spain
A Complete Unknown		Phedon Papamichael	James Mangold	United States
F1		Claudio Miranda	Joseph Kosinski	United States
Franz		Tomasz Naumiuk	Agnieszka Holland	Czech Republic, Poland, Germany
Hamnet		Łukasz Żal	Chloé Zhao	United Kingdom
A House of Dynamite		Barry Ackroyd	Kathryn Bigelow	United States
Late Shift	Heldin	Judith Kaufmann	Petra Volpe	Switzerland, Germany
Mother	Мајка	Virginie Saint-Martin	Teona Strugar Mitevska	Belgium, Macedonia, Sweden, Denmark, India
Nuremberg		Dariusz Wolski	James Vanderbilt	United States
Sinners		Autumn Durald Arkapaw	Ryan Coogler	United States, Australia, Canada
Sound of Falling	In die Sonne schauen	Fabian Gamper	Mascha Schilinski	Germany
Springsteen: Deliver Me from Nowhere		Masanobu Takayanagi	Scott Cooper	United States

=== Documentary Features Competition ===
English Title	Original Title	Cinematographer(s)	Director(s)	Production countrie(s)
All the Mountains Give		Arash Rakhsha	Arash Rakhsha	Iran, United States
Dear Tomorrow		Kaspar Astrup Schröder	Kaspar Astrup Schröder	Denmark, Japan, Sweden
Iron Winter		Benjamin Bryan	Kasimir Burgess	Australia
Messengers		Adam Crosby	Jeffrey Zablotny	Canada
The Queen and the Smokehouse	Bałtyk	Kacper Gawron	Iga Lis	Poland
Silver		Stanisław Cuske	Natalia Koniarz	Poland

=== Director's Debuts Competition ===
English Title	Original Title	Cinematographer(s)	Director(s)	Production countrie(s)
Bagger Drama		Pascal Reinmann	Piet Baumgartner	Switzerland
The Chronology of Water		Corey Waters	Kristen Stewart	United States, France, Latvia
East of Wall		Austin Shelton	Kate Beecroft	United States
Eleanor the Great		Hélène Louvart	Scarlett Johansson	United States
Girl	女孩	Yu Jing-pin	Shu Qi	Taiwan, China
If I Had Legs I'd Kick You		Christopher Messina	Mary Bronstein	United States
Reedland	Rietland	Sam du Pon	Sven Bresser	Netherlands, Belgium
Sand City	বালুর নগরীতে	Mathieu Giombini	Mahde Hasan	Bangladesh
Solitary		David Christopher Lynch	Eamonn Murphy	Ireland
Truth & Treason		Bianca Cline	Matt Whitaker	Lithuania, United States

=== Cinematographer's Debuts Competition ===
English Title	Original Title	Cinematographer(s)	Director(s)	Production countrie(s)
Censurada		Nicolás Aguado, Ianire Beriain	Mario Garza	United States, Spain, Mexico
East of Wall		Austin Shelton	Kate Beecroft	United States
Father	Otec	Adam Suzin	Tereza Nvotová	Slovakia, Czech Republic, Poland
In the Shadow	La sebarda	Amir Aliveisi	Salem Salavati	Kurdistan, Iran, Sweden
Raptures	Rörelser	Mimmo Hildén	Jon Blåhed	Sweden, Finland
Reedland	Rietland	Sam du Pon	Sven Bresser	Netherlands, Belgium
Solitary		David Christopher Lynch	Eamonn Murphy	Ireland

=== Music Videos Competition ===
Music video	Performing artist(s)	Cinematographer(s)	Director(s)	Production countrie(s)
"Kiss Kiss Goodbye"	Adonxs	Marián Ontko	Jiří Horenský	Czech Republic, Slovakia
"Salve Mater"	Amenra	Thomas Vercauteren	Sam Debaecke	Belgium
"Supernatural"	Ariana Grande	Jeff Cronenweth	Christian Breslauer, Ariana Grande	United States
"Chains & Whips"	Clipse & Kendrick Lamar	Jake Gabbay	Gabriel Moses	United States
"It's Amazing to Be Young"	Fontaines D.C.	Jaime Ackroyd	Luna Carmoon	Ireland
"Luther"	Kendrick Lamar & SZA	Adam Newport-Berra	Karena Evans	United States
"Afterglow"	Klangkarussell & Givven	Rupert Höller	Matthias Helldoppler	Austria
"Giuseppe"	Labasco	Mattia Bernabè, Ludovica Dri	Valentina Branella	Italy
"The Dead Dance"	Lady Gaga	Andrés Arochi	Tim Burton	United States
"Cruel Love"	Leon Vynehall featuring Beau Nox	Dustin Lane	Alex Takács	United Kingdom
"Flood"	Little Simz	Rina Yang	Salomon Ligthelm	United States
"Consider Me Venus"	Sei Selina	Andreas Johannessen	Niels Windfeldt	Norway
"Altamaha-ha"	Stacy Subaro	Juliette Lossky	Adrian Villagomez	Canada
"Flames"	Will Swinton	Guido Raimondo	Brandon Chen	United States
"Zombie"	Yungblud	Courtney Bennett	Charlie Sarsfield	United Kingdom

=== TV Series Competition ===
Television series	Episode	Cinematographer(s)	Director(s)	Production countrie(s)
1923	"A Dream and a Memory"	Corrin Hodgson, Ben Richardson	Ben Richardson	United States
Adolescence	"Episode 2"	Matthew Lewis	Philip Barantini	United Kingdom
The Day of the Jackal	"Episode 1"	Christopher Ross	Brian Kirk	United Kingdom, United States
Lockerbie: A Search for Truth	"Episode 1"	Ashley Rowe	Otto Bathurst	United Kingdom, United States
Monster: The Ed Gein Story	"Buxom Bird"	Michael Bauman	Max Winkler	United States
One Hundred Years of Solitude	"Remedios Moscote"	Maria Sarasvati Herrera	Laura Mora	Colombia
The Residence	"The Fall of the House of Usher"	Paula Huidobro	Liza Johnson	United States
Severance	"Hello, Ms. Cobel"	Jessica Lee Gagné	Ben Stiller	United States
The Studio	"The Oner"	Adam Newport-Berra	Evan Goldberg, Seth Rogen	United States
A Thousand Blows	"Episode 4"	Milos Moore	Ashley Walters	United Kingdom

=== Polish Films Competition ===
English Title	Original Title	Cinematographer(s)	Director(s)	Production countrie(s)
Photosensitive	Swiatloczula	Michał Englert	Tadeusz Sliwa	Poland
Winter of the Crow		Tomasz Naumiuk	Kasia Adamik	Poland, Luxembourg, United Kingdom
Brother	Brat	Jolanta Dylewska	Maciej Sobieszczański	Poland
The Altar Boys	Ministranci	Piotr Sobociński Jr.	Piotr Domalewski	Poland
This Is Not Happening	To się nie dzieje	Ernest Wilczyński	Artur Wyrzykowski	Poland

=== Film and Art School Etudes Competition ===
English Title	Original Title	Cinematographer(s)	Director(s)	School	Production countrie(s)
Are You a Friend of Dorothy?		Andres Bernal	Andrés García Aguirre	New York Film Academy	United States
Dandelion		Bruce Puyu Wang	Fiona Obertinca	AFI Conservatory	United States
Ever After		Felix Pochlatko	Helen Hideko	Vienna Film Academy	Austria
Fathers	Otcové	Mikuláš Hrdlička	Petr Vlček	Film and TV School of the Academy of Performing Arts	Czech Republic
Haiphongpol		Witold Prokopczyk	Leon Korzyński	Warsaw Film School	Poland
Neverlandex	Nibylandex	Mateusz Gzel	Agata Kapuścińska	Warsaw Film School	Poland
The Hotel		Halil Tanisan	Halil Tanisan	Łódź Film School	Poland
NS4		Paweł Jach	Paweł Jach	Łódź Film School	Poland
Service	Serwis	Nikodem Marek	Michał Edelman	Łódź Film School	Poland
Inkubus		Luca Louis Hain	Reza Sam Mosadegh	Hamburg Media School	Germany
Who We Used to Be	Wie Es War	Marvin Rizzo	Lukas Treudler	Hamburg Media School	Germany
The Lighting Rod	Matalapaine	Annika Miettinen	Helmi Donner	Aalto University	Finland
A Man Fate Forgot		Yash Bhatnagar	Jake R. Fuzak	Dodge College of Film and Media Arts	United States
Marina		Francesca Avanzini	Paoli de Luca	Centro Sperimentale di Cinematografia	Italy
Memory Merchant		Alberts Bērziņš	Adrian Breza	Baltic Film, Media and Arts School	Estonia
Not to Come Back	Niepowrót	Katarzyna Lewek	Katarzyna Lewek	Krzysztof Kieślowski Film School	Poland
Photo Play XX		Max Losson	Zolomon Zelko	Florida State University	United States
Skin on Skin		Nico Schrenk	Simon Schneckenburger	Filmakademie Baden-Württemberg	Germany
They Made You Into a Weapon and Told You to Find Peace		Antonia Schäfer	Roxana Stroe	National Film and Television School	United Kingdom
Tough Love		Maiya Rice	Oisin Mckeogh	National Film School	Ireland
The USB Paradox		Felix Foltas	Felix Foltas, Jonas Perkmann	Salzburg University of Applied Sciences	Austria
Walud		Henri Nunn	Daood Alabdulaa, Louise Zenker	University of Television and Film Munich	Germany, Syria
Where Time Stood Still	Sadac Dro Idga	Shuli Huang	Nino Benashvili	NYU Tisch School of the Arts	Georgia, United States

=== Special Screenings ===
English Title	Original Title	Cinematographer(s)	Director(s)	Production countrie(s)
Frankenstein		Dan Laustsen	Guillermo del Toro	United States
Mulan		Mandy Walker	Niki Caro	United States
The Testament of Ann Lee		William Rexer	Mona Fastvold	United Kingdom, United States
Ballad of a Small Player		James Friend	Edward Berger	United Kingdom
Amrum		Karl Walter Lindenlaub	Fatih Akin	Germany
Sorry, Baby		Mia Cioffi Henry	Eva Victor	United States
Sentimental Value	Affeksjonsverdi	Kasper Tuxen	Joachim Trier	Norway, France, Germany, Denmark, Sweden, United Kingdom
Father Mother Sister Brother		Frederick Elmes, Yorick Le Saux	Jim Jarmusch	United States, Ireland, France, Italy, Japan
Train Dreams		Adolpho Veloso	Clint Bentley	United States
Legend of the Happy Worker		Reed Smoot	Duwayne Dunham	United States
The Lost Bus		Pål Ulvik Rokseth	Paul Greengrass	United States
Bagger Drama		Pascal Reinmann	Piet Baumgartner	Switzerland
Artistic Experiments, Non Finito
Bugonia		Robbie Ryan	Yorgos Lanthimos	Ireland, South Korea, United States
28 Years Later		Anthony Dod Mantle	Danny Boyle	United Kingdom, United States
Motor City		John Matysiak	Potsy Ponciroli	United States
The Lake	Le Lac	Joseph Areddy, Fabrice Aragno	Fabrice Aragno	Switzerland
The Delights of the Garden	Las delicias del jardín	José Luis Alcaine	Fernando Colomo	Spain
Documentary Special Screenings
Bedrock		Hanna Linkowska	Kinga Michalska	Canada
The Eyes of Ghana		David Feeney-Mosier, Brandon Somerhalder	Ben Proudfoot	United States
The Golden Spurtle		Dimitri Zaunders	Constantine Costi	United Kingdom, Australia
Last Take: Rust and the Story of Halyna		Craig Boydston, Halyna Hutchins, Oliver Lukacs, Michael Pessah, Olesia Saveleva, Serge Svetnoy, Corey Weintraub, Dennis Zanatta, Daniel Zollinger	Rachel Mason	United States
Letters from Wolf Street	Listy z Wilczej	Arjun Talwar	Arjun Talwar	Poland, Germany
Megadoc		Mike Figgis	Mike Figgis	United States
Mensch		Bartosz Bieniek	Paweł Wysoczański	Poland
A Teddy Bear for Michael	Miś dla Michaela	Grzegorz Hartfiel	Grzegorz Zasępa	Poland
Underland		Ruben Woodin Dechamps	Rob Petit	United States, United Kingdom

=== Film and Art School Etudes Panorama ===
English Title	Original Title	Cinematographer(s)	Director(s)	School	Production countrie(s)
Call Samba	Volej, Samba	Nikolas Sand	Jana Švadlenková	Akademie Michael Higher Vocational School	Czech Republic
Close to September	Casi Septiembre	Gemma de Miguel Morell	Lucía García Romero	Cinema and Audiovisual School of Catalonia	Spain
The Dissident	Rohelise seljakotiga mees	Villem Sooster	Mathias Albrecht	Baltic Film, Media and Arts School	Estonia
Lily in the Rain	Lily sous la pluie	Félix Fradélizi, Tim Saillant	Salomé Brocard, Léonard Faugières	École nationale supérieure Louis-Lumière	France
Probably... See You Later!	No to pa!	Bartosz Gaczyński	Bartosz Gaczyński	Krzysztof Kieślowski Film School	Poland
Quicksand	Treibsand	Paul Nägl	Nevin Çubuk	Internationale Filmschule Köln	Germany
Rock Paper Scissors	가위바위보	Seunghyun Lee	Eunjung Kang	Chung-Ang University	South Korea
Rooftop Lempicka	Lempicka Trên Mái Nhà	Carlos Estrada	Hằng Lương Nguyễn	University of Texas	Vietnam, United States
Sárú		Adam McCormack	Elena Walsh O'Brien	National Film School	Ireland
Sonata	Sonata a Quattro Mani	Alessandro Massaroni, Carlo Salsilli	Tullio Edoardo Rocca	Gian Maria Volonté School of Cinematic Art	Italy
Strangers		Yue Ma	Eric Zhang	NYU Tisch School of the Arts	United States
Sweden	Schweden	Annemarie Chladek	Nik Azad	Konrad Wolf Film University of Babelsberg	Germany
The Things We Keep		Daeil Kim	Joanna Fernandez	University of Southern California	United States

=== Documentary Shorts Competition ===
English Title	Original Title	Cinematographer(s)	Director(s)	Production countrie(s)
The Believers		Bill Kirstein	Evan Newman	Thailand, United States
Lanawaru		Angello Faccini	Angello Faccini	Colombia, Mexico, United States
No Mean City		Ronnie McQuillan	Ross McClean	United Kingdom
Plongeurs		Jaime Ackroyd	Hector Aponysus	France
A Quiet Storm		Alexandre Nour	Benjamin Nicolas	Canada, Japan
Voices from the Abyss	Las voces del despeñadero	Eliott Reguera Vega	Víctor Rejón, Irving Serrano	Mexico
Welcome Home Freckles		Benjamin Kodboel	Huiju Park	United Kingdom

=== Retrospectives ===
English Title	Original Title	Cinematographer(s)	Director(s)	Production countrie(s)
David Lynch's World of Imagination
Blue Velvet (1986)		Frederick Elmes	David Lynch	United States
Duran Duran: Unstaged (3011)		Peter Deming	David Lynch	United States
DumbLand (2002)		David Lynch	David Lynch	United States
Twin Peaks: Fire Walk with Me (1992)		Ron García	David Lynch	France, United States
Twin Peaks: The Missing Pieces (2014)		Ron García	David Lynch	United States
David Lynch: The Art Life (2016)		Jason Scheunemann	Olivia Neergaard-Holm, Rick Barnes, Jon Nguyen	United States, Denmark
Lucky (2017)		Tim Suhrstedt	John Carroll Lynch	United States
More Things That Happened (2007)		David Lynch	David Lynch	United States, France, Poland
Liz Garbus Retrospective
Bobby Fischer Against the World (2011)		Robert Chappell	Liz Garbus	United States
Becoming Cousteau (2021)		Liz Garbus	Liz Garbus	United States
There's Something Wrong with Aunt Diane (2011)		Michael Tucker	Liz Garbus	United States
The Farm: Angola, USA (1998)		Sam Henriques, Bob Perrin	Liz Garbus, Wilbert Rideau, Jonathan Stack	United States
What Happened, Miss Simone? (2015)		Igor Martinovic	Liz Garbus	United States

== Special awards ==
- Icon Award: Cate Blanchett
- Outstanding Achievements in Documentary Filmmaking: Liz Garbus
- Actor's Award: Joel Edgerton

== FilmLight Colour Awards ==
Nominees were announced on 22 October 2025. Winners were announced on 16 November 2025.

Theatrical Feature	TV Series / Episodic	Commercial
The Brutalist – Máté Ternyik; Mickey 17 – Damien Vandercruyssen at Harbor; Nosferatu – Adam Glassman at Goldcrest; Sinners – Kostas Theodosiou at FotoKem; The Phoenician Scheme – Gareth Spensley at Company 3	Disclaimer – Peter Doyle at PostWorks NY; Andor: "Ever Been to Ghorman?"; "Welcome to the Rebellion"; "Jedha, Kyber, Erso" – Jean-Clement Soret at Company 3; Severance – Tom Poole at Company 3; The Studio – Damien Vandercruyssen at Harbor	Bluff Bounce: "Prologue" – Franziska Heinemann; Gucci: "We Will Always Have London" – Tim Masick at Company 3; KFC: "Obsession" – Mark Gethin at Trafik; Office Magazine: "Michael Shannon: A Reflection on Life, Art, Unity and the Divine" – Dylan Hageman at House Post
Spotlight Award	Music Video	Emerging Talent
Good Shot – Connor Bailey at House Post; Duchoň – Ondřej Štibingr at PFX; La Hija Cóndor – Leo Fallas at Fermento Color; Nawi Dear Future Me – Marina Starke	Bad Bunny: "Nuevayol" – Dante Pasquinelli at Ethos Studio; Damiano David: "Next Summer" – Valerio Liberatore at Frame by Frame; Maggie Rogers: "In the Living Room" – Jake White at Company 3; Wren Evans: "Cứu Lấy Âm Nhạc" – Sam Howells at Ethos Studio	Converse x Daily Paper: "Homecoming" – Marina Starke; Bluff Bounce: "Prologue" – Franziska Heinemann; S Bahn: "A Century In Motion" – Imri Agmon; Timberland: "50 Years of Hip-Hop" – Connor Bailey at House Post
