= 2025 New York Film Festival =

63rd edition

- Opening film: After the Hunt
- Closing film: Is This Thing On?
- Location: New York City, United States
- Founded: 1963
- Founded by: Richard Roud and Amos Vogel
- Hosted by: Film at Lincoln Center
- Artistic director: Dennis Lim
- Festival date: September 26 – October 13, 2025
- Website: https://www.filmlinc.org/nyff/

New York Film Festival
- 2026 2024

The 63rd New York Film Festival took place from September 26 to October 13, 2025, in New York City, presented by Film at Lincoln Center.

Luca Guadagnino's thriller film After the Hunt was the opening film. Jim Jarmusch's anthology drama film Father Mother Sister Brother was the festival's centerpiece. Bradley Cooper's comedy Is This Thing On? was the closing film.

On October 4, the NYFF organization announced a surprise "secret screening" of a highly anticipated new film for October 6, leading to speculation around the selection of Josh Safdie's Marty Supreme, which was later confirmed.

Appearing in the NYFF's "Main Slate" for the first time are Kahlil Joseph, Milagros Mumenthaler, Mary Bronstein, Pedro Pinho, Francesco Sossai, Kent Jones, Hlynur Pálmason, Sergei Loznitsa, and Mascha Schilinski.

World premieres includes Bradley Cooper's Is This Thing On?, Josh Safdie's Marty Supreme, Ulrich Köhler's Gavagai, Ronan Day-Lewis' Anemone, Rebecca Miller's Mr. Scorsese and Ben Stiller's Stiller & Meara: Nothing Is Lost.

== Official Selections ==
=== Main Slate ===
The following films were selected to the "Main Slate" section:

English Title	Original Title	Director(s)	Production Country
After the Hunt (opening film)		Luca Guadagnino	Italy, United States
Below the Clouds	Sotto le nuvole	Gianfranco Rosi	Italy
BLKNWS: Terms & Conditions		Kahlil Joseph	United States
Cover-Up		Laura Poitras and Mark Obenhaus	United States
The Currents	Las corrientes	Milagros Mumenthaler	Switzerland, Argentina
Duse		Pietro Marcello	Italy, France
Father Mother Sister Brother (centerpiece)		Jim Jarmusch	United States, Ireland, France, Italy, Japan
The Fence	Le Cri des Gardes	Claire Denis	France
Gavagai		Ulrich Köhler	Germany, France
A House of Dynamite		Kathryn Bigelow	United States
If I Had Legs I'd Kick You		Mary Bronstein	United States
I Only Rest in the Storm	O Riso e a Faca	Pedro Pinho	Portugal, Brazil, France, Romania
Is This Thing On? (closing film)		Bradley Cooper	United States
It Was Just an Accident	یک تصادف ساده	Jafar Panahi	Iran, France, Luxembourg
Jay Kelly		Noah Baumbach	United Kingdom, United States, Italy
Kontinental '25		Radu Jude	Romania, Brazil, Switzerland, United Kingdom, Luxembourg
The Last One for the Road	Le città di pianura	Francesco Sossai	Italy
Late Fame		Kent Jones	United States
The Love That Remains	Ástin Sem Eftir Er	Hlynur Pálmason	Iceland, Denmark, France, Finland, Sweden
Magellan	Magalhães	Lav Diaz	Portugal, Spain, Philippines, France
The Mastermind		Kelly Reichardt	United States, United Kingdom
Miroirs No. 3		Christian Petzold	Germany
No Other Choice	어쩔수가없다	Park Chan-wook	South Korea
Our Land	Nuestra tierra	Lucrecia Martel	Argentine, Mexico, France, United States, Netherlands, Denmark
Peter Hujar's Day		Ira Sachs	United States, Germany
Resurrection	狂野时代	Bi Gan	China, France
Romería		Carla Simón	Spain, Belgium, Germany
Rose of Nevada		Mark Jenkin	United Kingdom
The Secret Agent	O Agente Secreto	Kleber Mendonça Filho	Brazil, France, Germany, Netherlands
Sentimental Value	Affeksjonsverdi	Joachim Trier	Norway, France, Germany, Denmark, Sweden, United Kingdom
Sirāt		Oliver Laxe	Spain, France
Sound of Falling	In die Sonne schauen	Mascha Schilinski	Germany
Two Prosecutors	Два прокурора	Sergei Loznitsa	Latvia, France, Germany, Netherlands, Romania, Lithuania
What Does That Nature Say to You	그 자연이 네게 뭐라고 하니	Hong Sang-soo	South Korea

=== Spotlight Gala ===
Film at Lincoln Center announced Springsteen: Deliver Me from Nowhere as the first film of the "Spotlight" section on August 11, 2025. The entire line-up was announced on August 12:

English Title	Original Title	Director(s)	Production Country
Anemone		Ronan Day-Lewis	United Kingdom, United States
Blue Moon		Richard Linklater	United States
La grazia		Paolo Sorrentino	Italy
Mr. Scorsese (series)		Rebecca Miller	United States
Marty Supreme (secret screening)		Josh Safdie	United States
Nouvelle Vague		Richard Linklater	France
The Perfect Neighbor		Geeta Gandbhir	United States
Pillion		Harry Lighton	United Kingdom
A Private Life	Vie privée	Rebecca Zlotowski	France
Put Your Soul on Your Hand and Walk	لماء ضع على يدك وامشي	Sepideh Farsi	France, Palestine, Iran
Scarlet	果てしなきスカーレット	Mamoru Hosoda	Japan
Springsteen: Deliver Me from Nowhere		Scott Cooper	United States
Stiller & Meara: Nothing Is Lost		Ben Stiller	United States
Short films
Arguments in Favor of Love		Gabriel Abrantes	Portugal
Cairo Streets		Abdellah Taïa	France
Carol & Joy		Nathan Silver	United States
Doomed and Famous		Bingham Bryant	United States
February Omen		Mary Rose McClain	United States
Fragments for Venus		Alice Diop	France, Italy
Index		Radu Muntean	Romania
Nervous Energy		Eve Liu	United States
Turtle Sandwich		David Cardoza	United States

=== Currents ===
The Currents slate includes 16 feature films and 24 short films in five programs, representing 28 countries. The following films were selected:

English Title	Original Title	Director(s)	Production Country
Back Home	回家	Tsai Ming-liang	Taiwan
Barrio Triste		Stillz	Colombia
Bouchra		Orian Barki and Meriem Bennani	Italy, Morocco, United States
Dracula		Radu Jude	Romania, Austria, Luxembourg, Brazil
Drunken Noodles		Lucio Castro	Argentina, United States
Dry Leaf	ხმელი ფოთოლი	Alexandre Koberidze	Germany, Georgia
Ecce Mole		Heinz Emigholz	Italy
Escape / Toso	逃走	Masao Adachi	Japan
Evidence		Lee Anne Schmitt	United States
Hair, Paper, Water...	Tóc, Giấy và Nước...	Minh Quý Trương and Nicolas Graux	Vietnam, France, Belgium
Last Night I Conquered the City of Thebes	Anoche conquisté Tebas	Gabriel Azorín	Spain, Portugal
Levers		Rhayne Vermette	Canada
Little Boy		James Benning	United States
Mare's Nest		Ben Rivers	United Kingdom, France, Canada
Pin de Fartie		Alejo Moguillansky	Argentina
Windward		Sharon Lockhart	Canada, United States
With Hasan in Gaza	مع حسن في غزّة	Kamal Aljafari	Palestine, Germany, France, Qatar

==== Currents Shorts ====
English Title	Original Title	Director(s)	Production Country
Program 1: Below the Surface
Daria's Night Flowers	گل‌های شب ِدریا	Maryam Tafakory	Iran, United Kingdom, France
Dooni		Kevin Jerome Everson and Claudrena N. Harold	United States
Morning Circle	Morgenkreis	Basma al-Sharif	Canada, United Arab Emirates
A Real Christmas		Justin Jinsoo Kim	United States, South Korea
Tigers Can Be Seen in the Rain	Ya se ven los tigres en la lluvia	Oscar Ruiz Navia	Colombia, Canada
Program 2: Afterimages
09/05/1982		Jorge Caballero and Camilo Restrepo	Spain, Mexico
As Told by a Corpse		Yace Sula	United States
A Metamorphosis		Lin Htet Aung	Myanmar
Slet 1988		Marta Popivoda	Germany, France, Serbia
Time Life Volume 15. Monument to a Period of Time in Which I Lived		Mungo Thomson	United States
Water Sports		Whammy Alcazaren	Philippines
Program 3: Common Ground
Anoka		Karthik Pandian	United States, India
Give It Back: Crimes Against Realty		New Red Order	United States
Jacob's House		Lucas Kane	United States
Program 4: Model Behaviors
Acetone Reality		Sara Magenheimer and Michael Bell-Smith	United States
And If the Body		Toby Lee	United States
Fiction Contract		Carolyn Lazard	United States
Their Eyes		Nicolas Gourault	France
Program 5: Fields of Vision
As a Tree Walks to Its Forest		Jiayi Chen	United States
FELT		Blake Williams	Canada, United States, Spain
Keyhole Conversation		Peter Larsson	Sweden
Lover, Lovers, Loving, Love		Jodie Mack	United States
toward a fundamental theory of physics		Victor Van Rossem	Belgium

=== Revivals ===
Revivals celebrates works that have been restored, preserved, or digitally remastered. The following films were selected:

English Title	Original Title	Director(s)	Production Country
Angel's Egg (1985)	天使のたまご	Mamoru Oshii	Japan
The Arch (1968)	董夫人	T'ang Shushuen	Hong Kong
Black Girl (1972)		Ossie Davis	United States
Can She Bake a Cherry Pie? (1983)		Henry Jaglom	United States
Days and Nights in the Forest (1970)	Araṇyēra Dinarātri	Satyajit Ray	India
Mortu Nega (1988)		Flora Gomes	Guinea-Bissau
Queen Kelly (1929)		Erich von Stroheim	United States
The Razor's Edge / A Suspended Life (1985)	غزل البنات	Jocelyne Saab	France, Lebanon
Robert Wilson and the Civil Wars (1985)		Howard Brookner	United States
Shades of Silk (1978)	Ombres de soie	Mary Stephen	Canada, France
Sholay (director's cut) (1975)		Ramesh Sippy	India
The Wife of Seisaku (1965)	清作の妻	Yasuzō Masumura	Japan
