= Daniel Day-Lewis =

English actor (born 1957)

Sir Daniel Day-Lewis
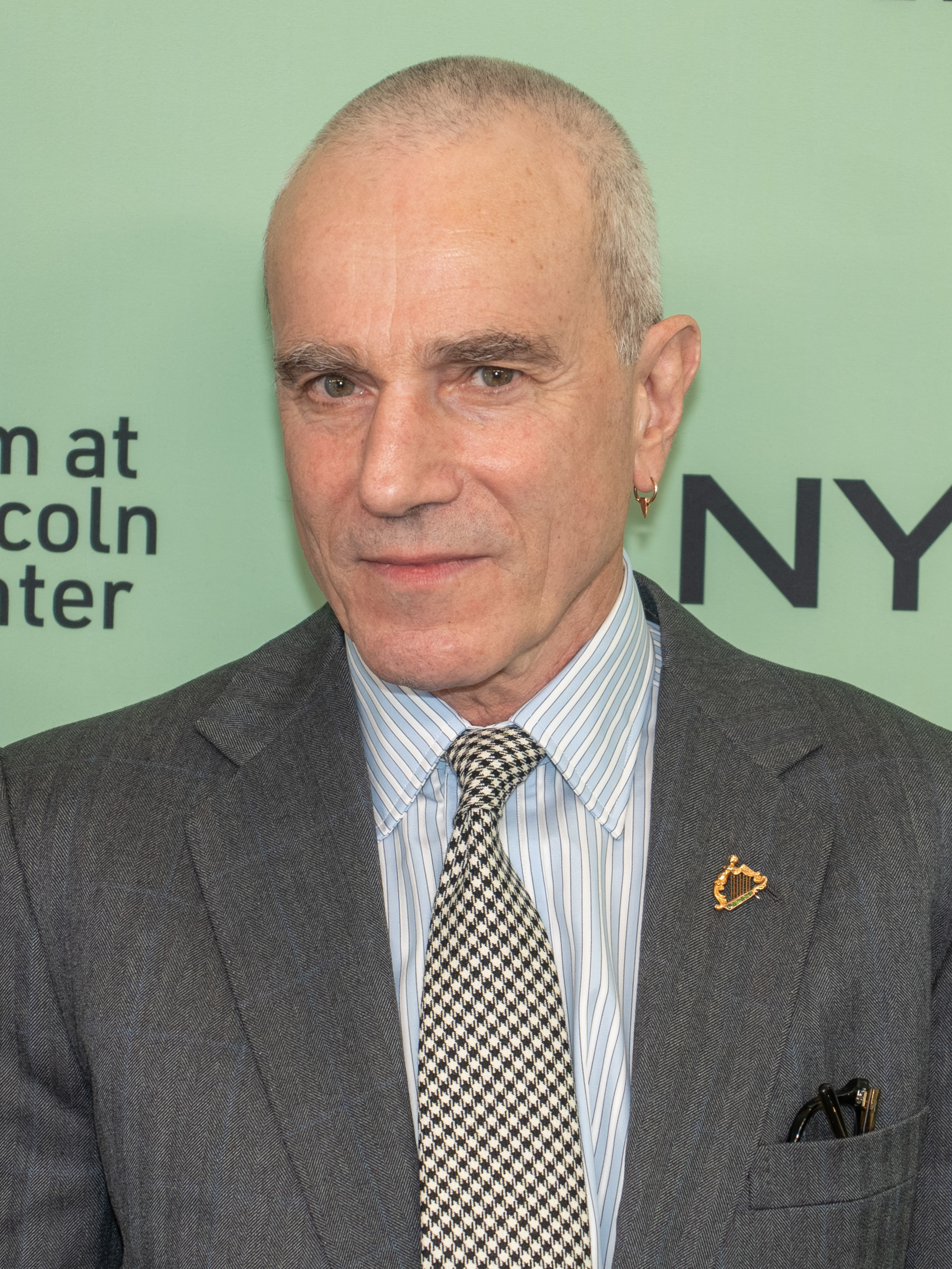
- Day-Lewis in 2025
- Born: Daniel Michael Blake Day-Lewis; 29 April 1957 (age 69); London, England
- Citizenship: United Kingdom; Ireland (since 1993)
- Education: Bristol Old Vic Theatre School
- Occupation: Actor
- Years active: 1971–1997; 2000–2017; 2025–present
- Spouse: Rebecca Miller (m. 1996)
- Partner: Isabelle Adjani (1989–1995)
- Children: 3, including Ronan
- Parents: Cecil Day-Lewis (father); Jill Balcon (mother)
- Relatives: Tamasin Day-Lewis (sister); Michael Balcon (grandfather)
- Awards: Full list

Sir Daniel Michael Blake Day-Lewis (born 29 April 1957) is an English actor. He is best known for intense method acting portrayed with eccentric characters in auteurs' films and has been regarded as one of the greatest actors in the history of cinema. He is the recipient of numerous accolades, including a record three Academy Awards for Best Actor, as well as four British Academy Film Awards and two Golden Globe Awards. In 2014, Day-Lewis received a knighthood for services to drama.

Born and raised in London, Day-Lewis excelled on stage at the National Youth Theatre before being accepted at the Bristol Old Vic Theatre School, which he attended for three years. Despite his traditional training at the Bristol Old Vic, he is considered a method actor, known for his constant devotion to and research of his roles. Protective of his private life, he rarely grants interviews and makes very few public appearances.

Day-Lewis shifted between theatre and film for most of the early 1980s, joining the Royal Shakespeare Company and playing Romeo Montague in Romeo and Juliet and Flute in A Midsummer Night's Dream. Playing the title role in Hamlet at the National Theatre in London in 1989, he left the stage midway through a performance after breaking down during a scene where the ghost of Hamlet's father appears before him—this was his last appearance on the stage. After supporting film roles in Gandhi (1982) and The Bounty (1984), he earned acclaim for his breakthrough performances in My Beautiful Laundrette (1985), A Room with a View (1985), and The Unbearable Lightness of Being (1988).

He earned three Academy Awards for Best Actor for his roles as Christy Brown in My Left Foot (1989), the oil tycoon Daniel Plainview in There Will Be Blood (2007), and Abraham Lincoln in Lincoln (2012). He was Oscar-nominated for In the Name of the Father (1993), Gangs of New York (2002), and Phantom Thread (2017). Other notable films include The Last of the Mohicans (1992), The Age of Innocence (1993), The Crucible (1996), and The Boxer (1997). He retired from acting twice, from 1997 to 2000, when he took up a new profession as an apprentice shoe-maker in Italy, and from 2017 to 2024. In 2025, he starred in and co-wrote Anemone, directed by his son Ronan.

== Early life and education ==
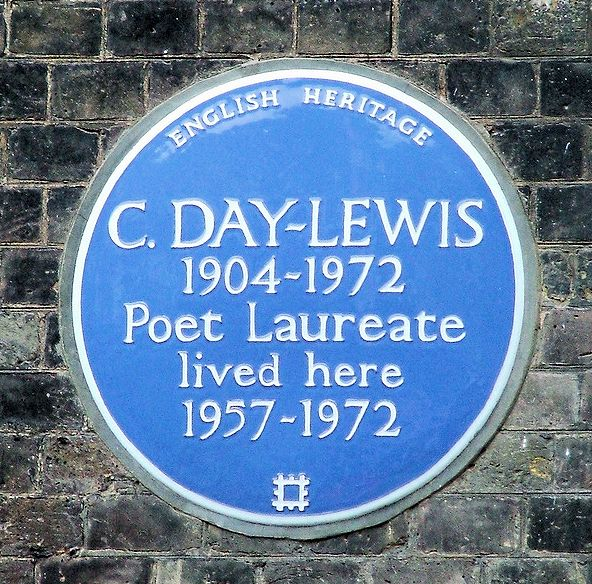
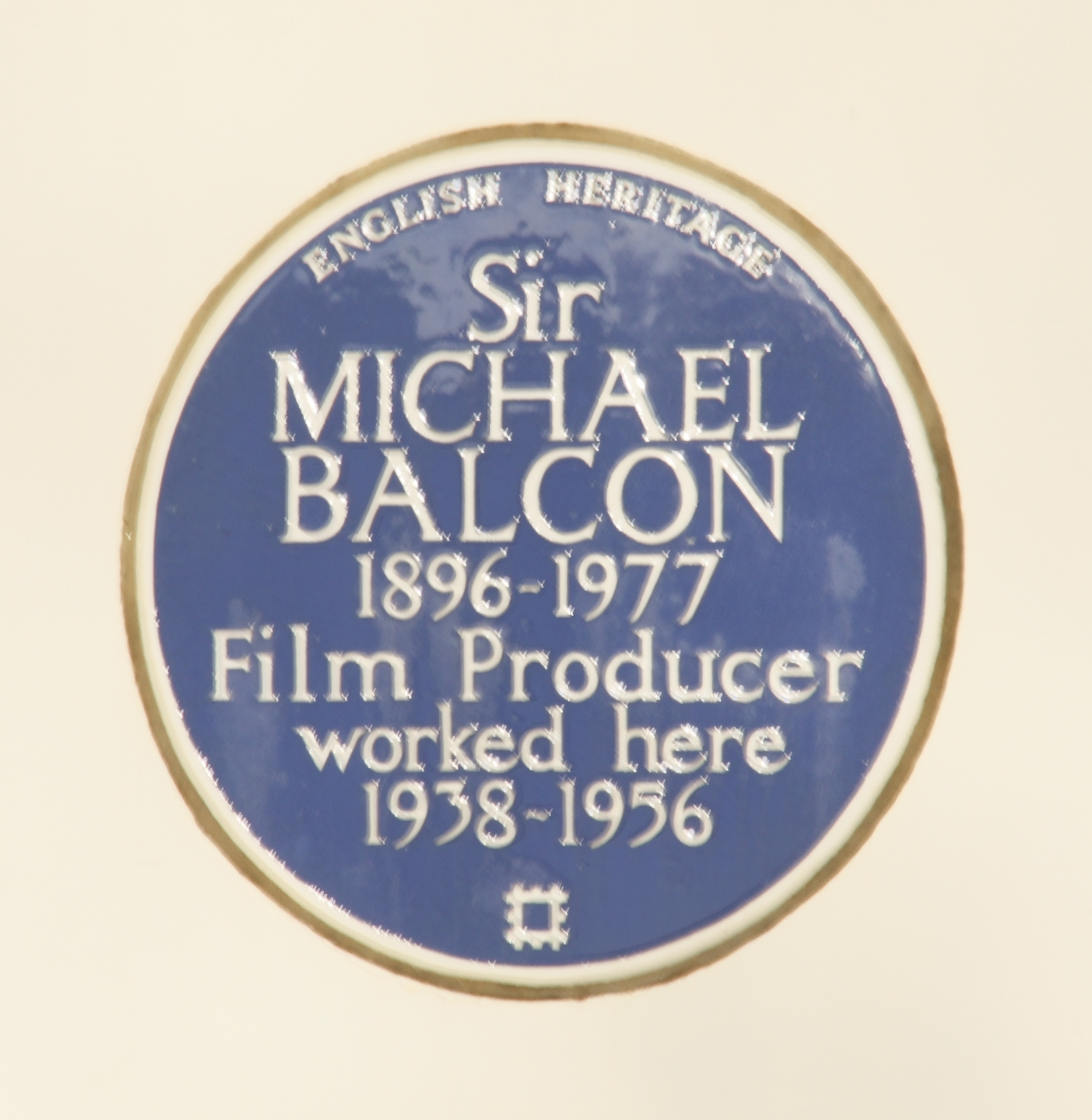
Day-Lewis's father Cecil and maternal grandfather Sir Michael Balcon were both awarded English Heritage blue plaques to mark their respective contributions to literature and cinema in the UK.

Daniel Michael Blake Day-Lewis was born on 29 April 1957 in Kensington, London, the second child of the poet Cecil Day-Lewis and his second wife, actress Jill Balcon. His older sister, Tamasin Day-Lewis, is a television chef and food critic. His father, who was born in the Irish town of Ballintubbert, County Laois, was of Protestant Anglo-Irish descent, lived in England from age two, and was appointed Poet Laureate in 1968. Day-Lewis's mother was Jewish; her Ashkenazi Jewish ancestors were immigrants to England in the late 19th century, from Latvia and Poland. Day-Lewis's maternal grandfather, Sir Michael Balcon, became the head of Ealing Studios, helping develop the new British film industry. The BAFTA for Outstanding Contribution to British Cinema is presented every year in honour of Balcon's memory.

Two years after Day-Lewis's birth, he moved with his family to Croom's Hill in Greenwich via Port Clarence, County Durham. He and his older sister did not see much of their older two half-brothers, who had been teenagers when Day-Lewis's father divorced their mother. Living in Greenwich (he attended Invicta and Sherington Primary schools), Day-Lewis had to deal with tough south London children. At this school, he was bullied for being both Jewish and "posh". He mastered the local accent and mannerisms, and credits that as being his first convincing performance. Later in life, he has been known to speak of himself as a disorderly character in his younger years, often in trouble for shoplifting and other petty crimes.

In 1968, Day-Lewis's parents, finding his behaviour to be too wild, sent him as a boarder to the independent Sevenoaks School in Kent. At the school, he was introduced to his three most prominent interests: woodworking, acting, and fishing. However, his disdain for the school grew, and after two years at Sevenoaks, he was transferred to another independent school, Bedales in Petersfield, Hampshire. His sister was already a pupil there, and it had a more relaxed and creative ethos. He made his film debut at age 14 in Sunday Bloody Sunday, in which he played a vandal in an uncredited role. He described the experience as "heaven" for getting paid £2 to vandalise expensive cars parked outside his local church.

For a few weeks in 1972, the Day-Lewis family lived at Lemmons, the north London home of Kingsley Amis and Elizabeth Jane Howard. Day-Lewis's father had pancreatic cancer, and Howard invited the family to Lemmons as a place they could use to rest and recuperate. His father died there in May of that year. By the time he left Bedales in 1975, Day-Lewis's unruly attitude had diminished and he needed to make a career choice. Although he had excelled on stage at the National Youth Theatre in London, he applied for a five-year apprenticeship as a cabinet maker, though he was rejected due to a lack of experience. He was accepted at the Bristol Old Vic Theatre School, which he attended for three years along with Miranda Richardson, eventually performing at the Bristol Old Vic itself. At one point he played understudy to Pete Postlethwaite, with whom he would later co-star in the film In the Name of the Father (1994).

John Hartoch, Day-Lewis's acting teacher at Bristol Old Vic, recalled:

There was something about him even then. He was quiet and polite, but he was clearly focused on his acting—he had a burning quality. He seemed to have something burning beneath the surface. There was a lot going on beneath that quiet appearance. There was one performance in particular, when the students put on a play called Class Enemy, when he really seemed to shine—and it became obvious to us, the staff, that we had someone rather special on our hands.

== Career ==
=== 1980s ===
During the early 1980s, Day-Lewis worked in theatre and television, including Frost in May (where he played an impotent man-child) and How Many Miles to Babylon? (as a World War I officer torn between allegiances to Britain and Ireland) for the BBC. Eleven years after his film debut, Day-Lewis had a small part in the film Gandhi (1982) as Colin, a South African street thug who racially bullies the title character. In late 1982, he had his big theatre break when he took over the lead in Another Country, which had premiered in late 1981. Next, he took on a supporting role as the conflicted, but ultimately loyal, first mate in The Bounty (1984). He next joined the Royal Shakespeare Company, playing Romeo in Romeo and Juliet and Flute in A Midsummer Night's Dream.

In 1985, Day-Lewis gave his first critically acclaimed performance playing a young gay English man in an interracial relationship with a Pakistani youth in the film My Beautiful Laundrette. Directed by Stephen Frears, and written by Hanif Kureishi, the film is set in 1980s London during Margaret Thatcher's tenure as Prime Minister. It is the first of three Day-Lewis films to appear in the BFI's 100 greatest British films of the 20th century, ranking 50th. Day-Lewis gained further public notice that year with A Room with a View (1985), based on the novel by E. M. Forster. Set in the Edwardian period of turn-of-the-20th-century England, he portrayed Cecil Vyse, the proper upper-class fiancé of the main character Lucy Honeychurch (played by Helena Bonham Carter).

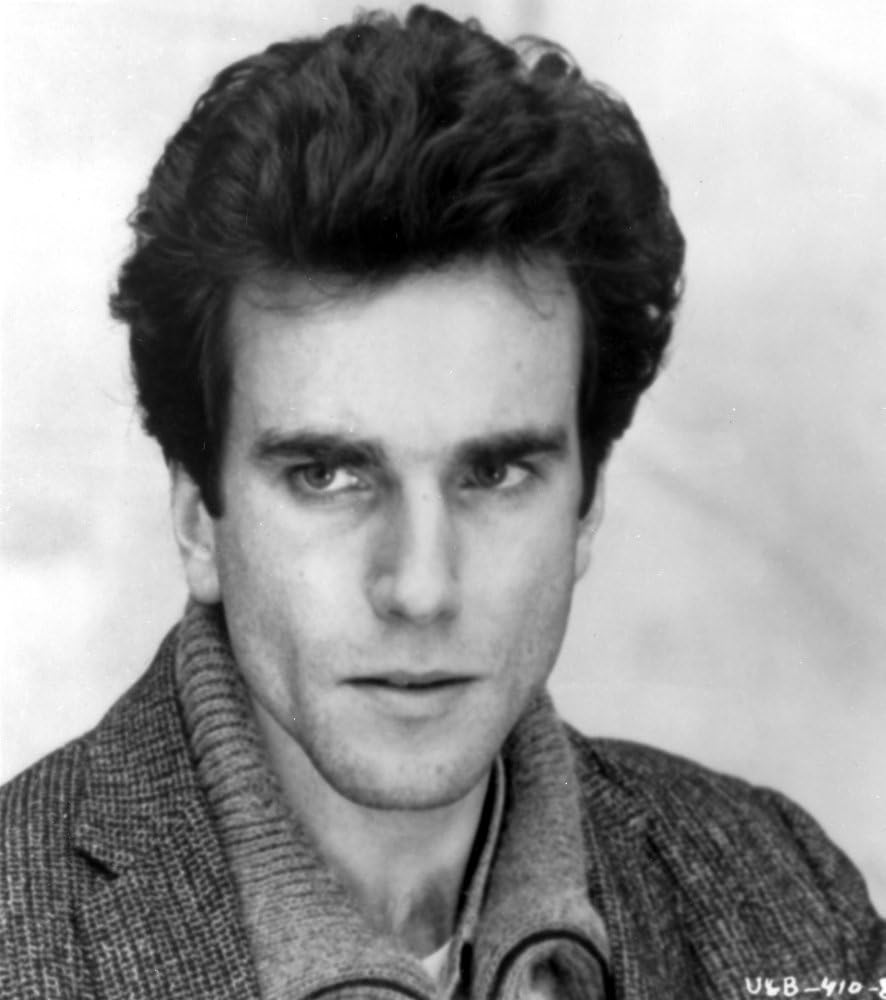
Day-Lewis in The Unbearable Lightness of Being (1988)

In 1987, Day-Lewis assumed leading man status by starring in Philip Kaufman's The Unbearable Lightness of Being, in which he portrayed a Czech surgeon whose hyperactive sex life is thrown into disarray when he allows himself to become emotionally involved with a woman. During the eight-month shoot, he learned Czech, and first began to refuse to break character on or off the set for the entire shooting schedule. During this period, Day-Lewis was regarded as "one of Britain's most exciting young actors". He and other young British actors of the time, such as Gary Oldman, Colin Firth, Tim Roth, and Bruce Payne, were dubbed the "Brit Pack".

Day-Lewis progressed his personal version of method acting in 1989 with his performance as Christy Brown in Jim Sheridan's My Left Foot. It won him numerous awards, including the Academy Award for Best Actor and BAFTA Award for Best Actor in a Leading Role. Brown, known as a writer and painter, was born with cerebral palsy, and was able to control only his left foot. Day-Lewis prepared for the role by making frequent visits to Sandymount School Clinic in Dublin, where he formed friendships with several people with disabilities, some of whom had no speech. During filming, he again refused to break character. Playing a severely paralysed character on screen, off-screen Day-Lewis had to be moved around the set in his wheelchair, and crew members would curse at having to lift him over camera and lighting wires, all so that he might gain insight into all aspects of Brown's life, including the embarrassments. Crew members were also required to spoon-feed him. It was rumoured that he had broken two ribs during filming from assuming a hunched-over position in his wheelchair for so many weeks, something he denied years later at the 2013 Santa Barbara International Film Festival.

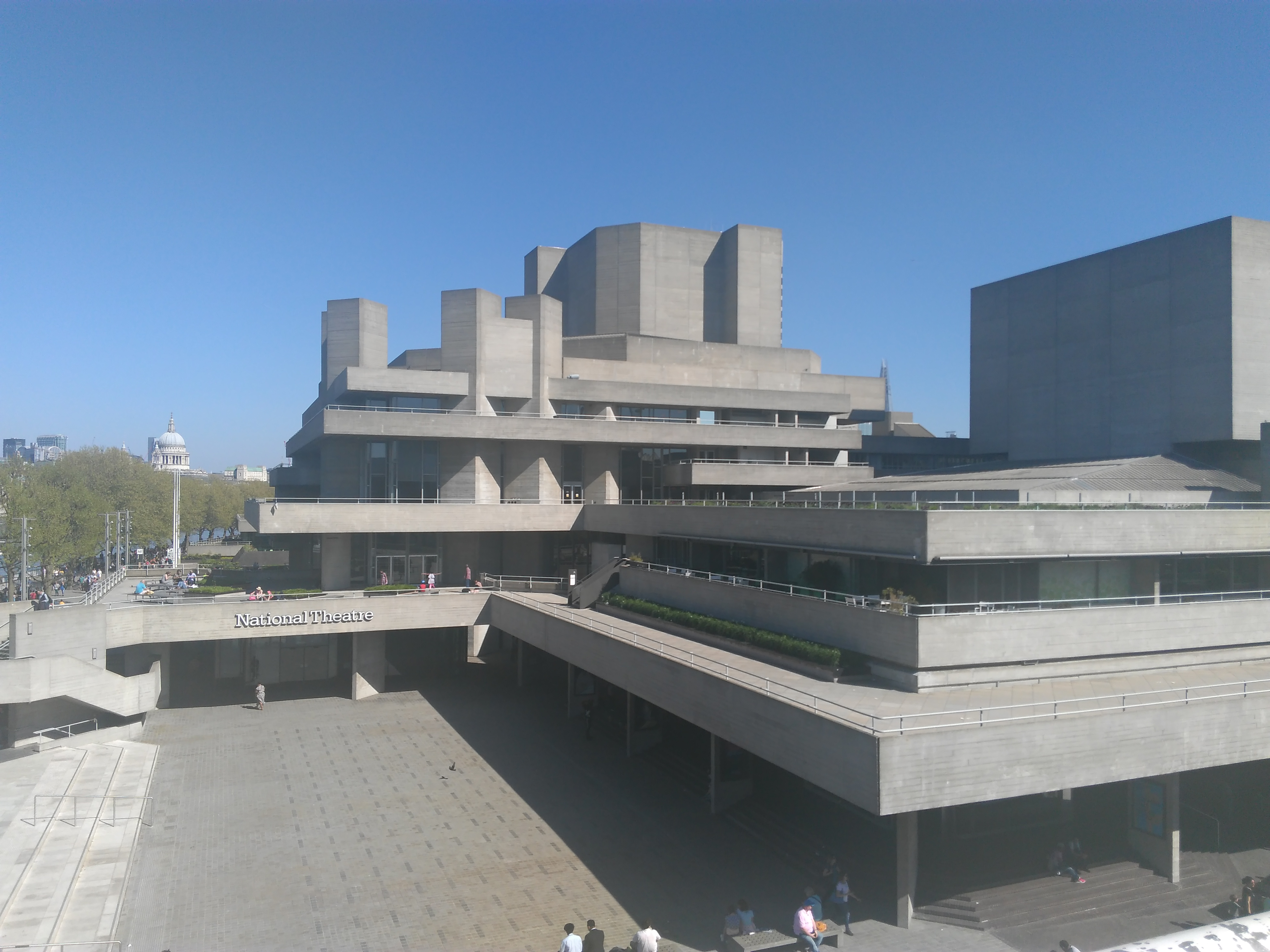
Day-Lewis played Hamlet in Richard Eyre's 1989 production of Hamlet at London's National Theatre (pictured), his final appearance on the stage.

Day-Lewis returned to the stage in 1989 to work with Richard Eyre, as the title character in Hamlet at the National Theatre, London, but during a performance collapsed during the scene where the ghost of Hamlet's father appears before him. He began sobbing uncontrollably, and refused to go back on stage; he was replaced by Jeremy Northam, who gave a triumphant performance. Ian Charleson formally replaced Day-Lewis for the rest of the run. Earlier in the run, Day-Lewis had talked of the "demons" in the role, and for weeks he threw himself passionately into the part. Although the incident was officially attributed to exhaustion, Day-Lewis said he had seen the ghost of his own father. He later explained that this was more of a metaphor than a hallucination. "To some extent I probably saw my father's ghost every night, because of course if you're working in a play like Hamlet, you explore everything through your own experience." He has not appeared on stage since. The media attention following his breakdown on-stage contributed to his decision to eventually move from England to Ireland in the mid-1990s, to regain a sense of privacy amidst his increasing fame.

=== 1990s ===
Day-Lewis starred in the American film The Last of the Mohicans (1992), based on a novel by James Fenimore Cooper. Day-Lewis's character research for this film was well-publicised; he reportedly underwent rigorous weight training and learned to live off the land and forest where his character lived, camping, hunting, and fishing. Day-Lewis also added to his wood-working skills, and learned how to make canoes. He carried a long rifle at all times during filming to remain in character.

Stories of his immersion in roles are legion. Playing Gerry Conlon in In the Name of the Father, Day-Lewis lived on prison rations to lose 30 lb, spent extended periods in the jail cell on set, went without sleep for two days, was interrogated for three days by real policemen, and asked that the crew hurl abuse and cold water at him. For The Boxer in 1997, he trained for weeks with the former world champion Barry McGuigan, who said that he became good enough to turn professional. The actor's injuries include a broken nose and a damaged disc in his lower back.

— "Daniel Day-Lewis aims for perfection". Article published in The Daily Telegraph on 22 February 2008

Day-Lewis reunited with Jim Sheridan for the biographical legal drama In the Name of the Father (1993). He portrayed Gerry Conlon, a member of the Guildford Four wrongfully convicted of a 1974 pub bombing perpetrated by the Provisional IRA. He lost 2st 2 lb (30 lb or 14 kg) for the part, kept his Northern Irish accent on and off the set for the entire shooting schedule, and spent stretches of time in a prison cell. He insisted that crew members throw cold water at him and verbally abuse him. Starring opposite Emma Thompson (who played his lawyer Gareth Peirce) and Pete Postlethwaite, Day-Lewis earned his second Academy Award nomination, third BAFTA nomination, and second Golden Globe nomination.

Day-Lewis returned to the US in 1993, playing Newland Archer in Martin Scorsese's adaptation of the Edith Wharton novel The Age of Innocence. He starred opposite Michelle Pfeiffer and Winona Ryder. To prepare for the film, set in America's Gilded Age, he wore 1870s-period aristocratic clothing around New York City for two months, including top hat, cane, and cape. Although Day-Lewis was sceptical of the role, thinking himself "too English" for it and hoping for something "more rough-and-tumble", he accepted due to Scorsese directing the film. The film was critically well received, and Peter Travers in Rolling Stone wrote: "Day-Lewis is smashing as the man caught between his emotions and the social ethic. Not since Olivier in Wuthering Heights has an actor matched piercing intelligence with such imposing good looks and physical grace."

In 1996, Day-Lewis starred in the film adaptation of Arthur Miller's play The Crucible, starring alongside Paul Scofield and Joan Allen and reuniting with Winona Ryder. Owen Gleiberman of Entertainment Weekly gave the film a grade of "A", calling the adaptation "joltingly powerful" and noting the "spectacularly" acted performances of Day-Lewis, Scofield, and Allen.

In 1997, he starred in Jim Sheridan's The Boxer alongside Emily Watson, playing a former boxer and IRA member recently released from prison. His preparation included training with former boxing world champion Barry McGuigan. Immersing himself into the boxing scene, he watched "Prince" Naseem Hamed train, and attended professional boxing matches such as the Nigel Benn vs. Gerald McClellan world title fight at London Arena. Impressed with his work in the ring, McGuigan felt Day-Lewis could have become a professional boxer, commenting, "If you eliminate the top ten middleweights in Britain, any of the other guys Daniel could have gone in and fought."

Following The Boxer, Day-Lewis took a leave of absence from acting by going into "semi-retirement" and returning to his old passion of woodworking. He moved to Florence, Italy, where he became intrigued by the craft of shoe-making. He apprenticed as a shoe-maker with Stefano Bemer. For a time, his exact whereabouts and actions were not made publicly known.

=== 2000s ===
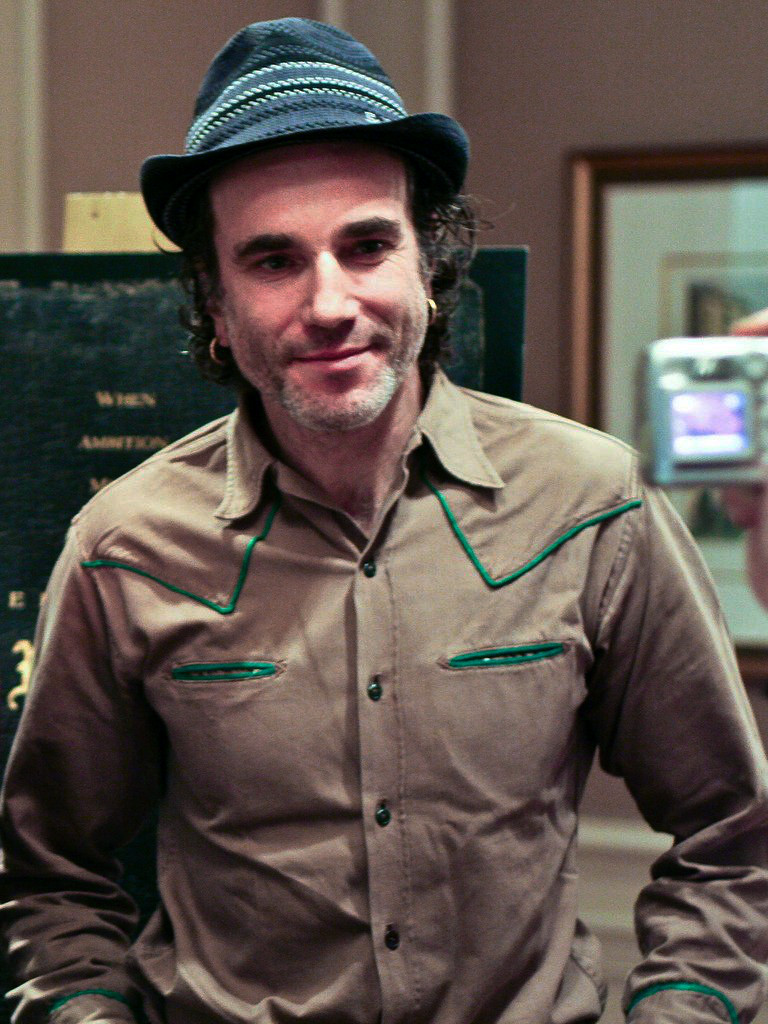
Day-Lewis in New York, 2007

After a three-year absence from acting on screen, Day-Lewis returned to film by reuniting with Martin Scorsese for Gangs of New York (2002). He took on the role of villainous gang leader William "Bill the Butcher" Cutting, starring opposite Leonardo DiCaprio, who played Bill's young protégé as well as Cameron Diaz, Jim Broadbent, John C. Reilly, Brendan Gleeson, and Liam Neeson. To help him get into character, he hired circus performers to teach him to throw knives. While filming, he was never out of character between takes, including keeping his character's New York accent.

At one point during filming, having been diagnosed with pneumonia, he refused to wear a warmer coat, or to take treatment, because it was not in keeping with the period. He was eventually persuaded to seek medical treatment. The film divided critics while Day-Lewis received plaudits for his portrayal of Bill the Butcher. Rotten Tomatoes's critical consensus reads, "Though flawed, the sprawling, messy Gangs of New York is redeemed by impressive production design and Day-Lewis's electrifying performance." It earned Day-Lewis his third Oscar nomination, and won him his second BAFTA Award for Best Actor in a Leading Role and first Actor Award for Outstanding Performance by a Male Actor in a Leading Role.

In the early 2000s, Day-Lewis's wife, director Rebecca Miller, offered him the lead role in her film The Ballad of Jack and Rose, in which he played a dying man with regrets over how his life had evolved, and over how he had brought up his teenage daughter. While filming, he arranged to live separately from his wife to achieve the "isolation" needed to focus on his own character's reality. The film received mixed reviews.

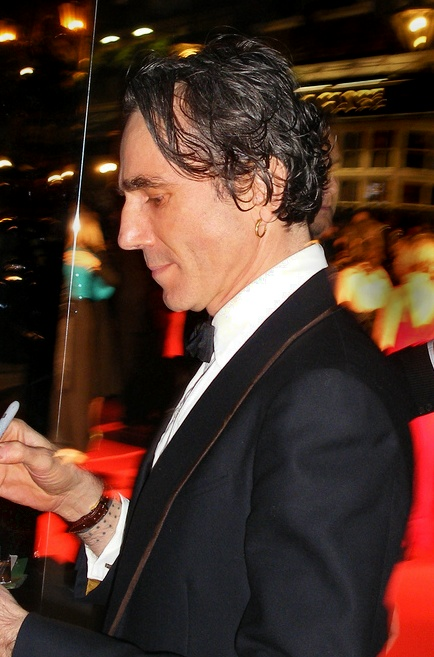
Day-Lewis at the 2008 British Academy Film Awards

In 2007, Day-Lewis starred alongside Paul Dano in Paul Thomas Anderson's loose film adaptation of Upton Sinclair's novel Oil!, titled There Will Be Blood. The film received widespread critical acclaim, with critic Andrew Sarris calling the film "an impressive achievement in its confident expertness in rendering the simulated realities of a bygone time and place, largely with an inspired use of regional amateur actors and extras with all the right moves and sounds." Day-Lewis received the Academy Award for Best Actor, BAFTA Award for Best Actor in a Leading Role, Golden Globe Award for Best Actor in a Motion Picture – Drama, Actor Award for Outstanding Performance by a Male Actor in a Leading Role (which he dedicated to Heath Ledger, who had died five days earlier, saying he was inspired by Ledger's acting and calling the actor's performance in Brokeback Mountain "unique, perfect"), and a variety of film critics' circle awards for the role. In winning the Best Actor Oscar, Day-Lewis joined Marlon Brando and Jack Nicholson as the only Best Actor winner awarded an Oscar in two non-consecutive decades.

In 2009, Day-Lewis starred in Rob Marshall's musical adaptation Nine as film director Guido Contini. The film featured a large ensemble of distinguished actresses, including Marion Cotillard, Penélope Cruz, Judi Dench, Nicole Kidman, and Sophia Loren. The film received mixed reviews, with overall praise for the performances of Day-Lewis, Cotillard, and Cruz. He was nominated for the Golden Globe Award for Best Actor in a Motion Picture – Musical or Comedy and the Satellite Award for Best Actor – Motion Picture Musical or Comedy for his role, as well as sharing nominations for the Actor Award for Outstanding Performance by a Cast in a Motion Picture and the Broadcast Film Critics Association Award for Best Cast and the Satellite Award for Best Cast – Motion Picture with the rest of the cast members.

=== 2010s ===
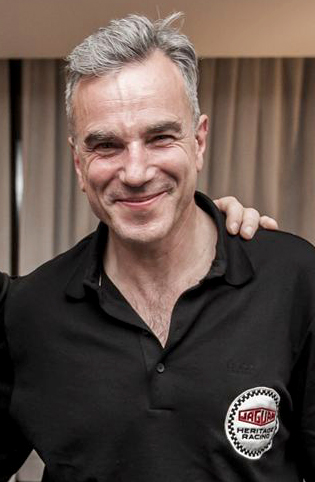
Day-Lewis in 2013

Day-Lewis portrayed Abraham Lincoln in Steven Spielberg's biopic Lincoln (2012). Based on the book Team of Rivals: The Political Genius of Abraham Lincoln, the film began shooting in Richmond, Virginia, in October 2011. Day-Lewis spent a year in preparation for the role, a time he had requested from Spielberg. He read over 100 books on Lincoln, and long worked with the make-up artist to achieve a physical likeness to Lincoln. Speaking in Lincoln's voice throughout the entire shoot, Day-Lewis asked the British crew members who shared his native accent not to chat with him.

Spielberg said of Day-Lewis's portrayal, "I never once looked the gift horse in the mouth. I never asked Daniel about his process. I didn't want to know." Lincoln received critical acclaim, especially for Day-Lewis's performance. It also became a commercial success, grossing over $275 million worldwide. In November 2012, he received the BAFTA Britannia Award for Excellence in Film. The same month, Day-Lewis featured on the cover of Time magazine as the "World's Greatest Actor".

At the 70th Golden Globe Awards, on 14 January 2013, Day-Lewis won his second Golden Globe Award for Best Actor, and at the 66th British Academy Film Awards on 10 February, he won his fourth BAFTA Award for Best Actor in a Leading Role. At the 85th Academy Awards, Day-Lewis became the first three-time recipient of the Best Actor Oscar for his role in Lincoln. John Hartoch, Day-Lewis's acting teacher at Bristol Old Vic theatre school, said of his former pupil's achievement:

Although we have quite an impressive alumni – everyone from Jeremy Irons to Patrick Stewart – I suppose he is now probably the best known, and we're very proud of all he's achieved. I certainly hold him up to current students of an example, particularly as an example of how to manage your career with great integrity. He's never courted fame, and as a result, he's never had his private life impeached [sic] upon by the press. He's clearly not interested in celebrity as such – he's just interested in his acting. He is still a great craftsman.

He's like Olivier in his prime. [Because he does so few movies], you expect something spectacular when he's got a film out. He's more selective than Brando, and it's turned his movies into events.

— David Poland on Day-Lewis, February 2013

Shortly after winning the Oscar for Lincoln, Day-Lewis announced he would be taking a break from acting before making another film. After a five-year hiatus, Day-Lewis returned to the screen to star in Paul Thomas Anderson's historical drama Phantom Thread (2017). Set in 1950s London, Day-Lewis played an obsessive dressmaker, Reynolds Woodcock, who falls in love with a waitress (played by Vicky Krieps). The film and his performance were met with widespread acclaim from critics, and Day-Lewis was again nominated for the Academy Award for Best Actor.

Prior to the film's release in June 2017, Day-Lewis announced that he was retiring from acting. In a November 2017 interview, Day-Lewis stated: "I need to believe in the value of what I'm doing. The work can seem vital, irresistible, even. And if an audience believes it, that should be good enough for me. But, lately, it isn't."

=== 2020s ===
On 1 October 2024, after a seven-year absence, it was announced that Day-Lewis would return to acting. He starred in Anemone, the first film directed by his son, Ronan Day-Lewis, with whom Daniel co-wrote the script. The film, in which Day-Lewis co-stars with Sean Bean and Samantha Morton, had its world premiere at the 2025 New York Film Festival. His performance was lauded as a "commanding return" by David Rooney for The Hollywood Reporter.

== Technique and reputation ==
Day-Lewis is considered a method actor, known for his constant devotion to and research of his roles. Displaying a "mercurial intensity", he would often remain completely in character throughout the shooting schedules of his films, even to the point of adversely affecting his health. He is one of the most selective actors in the film industry, having starred in only seven films since 1998, with as many as eight years between roles. Protective of his private life, he rarely grants interviews, and makes very few public appearances.

Following his third Oscar win in 2013, there was much debate about Day-Lewis's standing among the greatest actors in film history. Joe Queenan of The Guardian remarked, "Arguing whether Daniel Day-Lewis is a greater actor than Laurence Olivier, or Richard Burton, or Marlon Brando, is like arguing whether Messi is more talented than Pelé, whether Napoleon Bonaparte edges out Alexander the Great as a military genius." When Day-Lewis himself was asked what it was like to be "the world's greatest actor", he replied, "It's daft isn't it? It changes all the time."

Day-Lewis is widely respected among his peers and, in June 2017, Michael Simkins of The Guardian wrote, "In this glittering cesspit we call the acting profession, there are plenty of rival thesps who, through sheer luck or happenstance, seem to have the career we ourselves could have had if only the cards had fallen differently. But Day-Lewis is, by common consent, even in the most sourly disposed green rooms – a class apart. We shall not look upon his like again – at least for a bit. Performers of his mercurial intensity come along once in a generation."

== Personal life ==
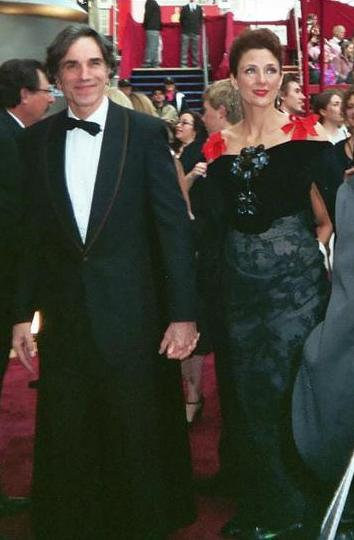
Day-Lewis with wife Rebecca Miller at the 2008 Academy Awards

=== Relationships and family ===
Protective of his privacy, Day-Lewis has described his life as a "lifelong study in evasion". He had a relationship with French actress Isabelle Adjani that lasted six years. Their son was born in 1995 in New York City a few months after the relationship ended.

While filming The Crucible in 1995, Day-Lewis visited the home of Arthur Miller – the playwright of the play from which the film was adapted – where he met Miller's daughter, Rebecca. After a year of dating, they married on 13 November 1996. They have two sons, Ronan (born 1998) and Cashel (born 2002). They divide their time between their homes in Manhattan, New York City, and Annamoe, County Wicklow, Ireland.

=== Citizenship and knighthood ===
Day-Lewis has held dual British and Irish citizenship since 1993. He has maintained his Annamoe home since 1997. He stated: "I do have dual citizenship, but I think of England as my country. I miss London very much, but I couldn't live there because there came a time when I needed to be private and was forced to be public by the press. I couldn't deal with it." He is a supporter of south-east London football club Millwall.

In 2008, when he received the Academy Award for Best Actor from Helen Mirren, who was on presenting duty having won the previous year's Best Actress Oscar for portraying Queen Elizabeth II in The Queen, Day-Lewis knelt before her, and she tapped him on each shoulder with the Oscar statuette, to which he quipped, "That's the closest I'll come to ever getting a knighthood." Six years later, Day-Lewis was appointed a Knight Bachelor in the 2014 Birthday Honours for services to drama. Prince William, Duke of Cambridge stood-in for the Queen on 14 November 2014, at his investiture ceremony at Buckingham Palace.

=== Academic honours and activities ===
In 2010, Day-Lewis received an honorary doctorate in letters from the University of Bristol, in part because of his attendance of the Bristol Old Vic Theatre School in his youth. Day-Lewis is also an ambassador for The Lir Academy, a new drama school at Trinity College Dublin, founded in 2011.

In 2012, he donated to the University of Oxford papers belonging to his father, the poet Cecil Day-Lewis, including early drafts of the poet's work and letters from actor John Gielgud and literary figures such as W. H. Auden, Robert Graves, and Philip Larkin.

=== Philanthropy ===
In 2005, Day-Lewis visited the Gaza Strip with the charity Médecins Sans Frontières, and criticised the occupation as "a state of apartheid". He wrote a piece titled "Gaza, Authors in the Frontline: Daniel Day-Lewis" (published in The Sunday Times, April 2005) in which he describes conditions in Gaza, including references to demolitions, checkpoints and psychological impact, commenting: "In the Gaza Strip the Israeli army reacts to stone-throwing with bullets".

In 2015, Day-Lewis became the honorary president of the Poetry Archive. A registered UK charity, the Poetry Archive is a free, web-based library containing a growing collection of recordings of English-language poets reading their work. In 2017 he became a patron of the Wilfred Owen Association. Day-Lewis's association with Wilfred Owen began with his father, Cecil Day-Lewis, who edited Owen's poetry in the 1960s and his mother, Jill Balcon, who was a vice-president of the Wilfred Owen Association until her death in 2009.

=== Religious views ===
Day-Lewis has stated that he had "no real religious education", and that he "suppose[s]" he is "a die-hard agnostic".

== Acting credits ==
=== Film ===
Table featuring feature films with Daniel Day-Lewis
Year	Title	Role	Director	Notes
1971	Sunday Bloody Sunday	Child Vandal	John Schlesinger	Uncredited
1982	Gandhi	Colin	Richard Attenborough	
1984	The Bounty	John Fryer	Roger Donaldson	
1985	My Beautiful Laundrette	Johnny Burfoot	Stephen Frears	
1985	A Room with a View	Cecil Vyse	James Ivory	
1986	Nanou	Max	Conny Templeman	
1988	The Unbearable Lightness of Being	Tomas	Philip Kaufman	
1988	Stars and Bars	Henderson Dores	Pat O'Connor	
1989	My Left Foot	Christy Brown	Jim Sheridan	
1989	Eversmile, New Jersey	Fergus O'Connell	Carlos Sorin	
1992	The Last of the Mohicans	Nathaniel "Hawkeye" Poe	Michael Mann	
1993	The Age of Innocence	Newland Archer	Martin Scorsese	
1993	In the Name of the Father	Gerry Conlon	Jim Sheridan	
1996	The Crucible	John Proctor	Nicholas Hytner	
1997	The Boxer	Danny Flynn	Jim Sheridan	
2002	Gangs of New York	Bill "the Butcher" Cutting	Martin Scorsese	
2005	The Ballad of Jack and Rose	Jack Slavin	Rebecca Miller	
2007	There Will Be Blood	Daniel Plainview	Paul Thomas Anderson	
2009	Nine	Guido Contini	Rob Marshall	
2012	Lincoln	Abraham Lincoln	Steven Spielberg	
2017	Phantom Thread	Reynolds Woodcock	Paul Thomas Anderson	Also uncredited co-writer
2025	Anemone	Ray Stoker	Ronan Day-Lewis	Also co-writer

=== Television ===
Table featuring television programs with Day-Lewis
Year	Title	Role	Notes
1980	Shoestring	DJ	Episode: "The Farmer Had a Wife"
1981	Thank You, P. G. Wodehouse	Psmith	Television film
1981	Artemis 81	Library Student	Television film
1982	How Many Miles to Babylon?	Alec	Television film
1982	Frost in May	Archie Hughes-Forret	Episode: "Beyond the Glass"
1983	Play of the Month	Gordon Whitehouse	Episode: "Dangerous Corner"
1985	My Brother Jonathan	Jonathan Dakers	5 episodes
1986	Screen Two	Dr. Kafka	Episode: "The Insurance Man"

=== Theatre ===
Table featuring theatre roles with Daniel Day-Lewis
Year(s)	Title	Role	Venue
1979	The Recruiting Officer	Townsperson/Soldier	Theatre Royal, Bristol
1979	Troilus and Cressida	Deiphobus	Theatre Royal, Bristol
1979	Funny Peculiar	Stanley Baldry	Little Theatre, Bristol
1979–80	Old King Cole	The Amazing Faz	Old Vic Theatre, Bristol
1980	Class Enemy	Iron	Old Vic Theatre, Bristol
1980	Edward II	Leicester	Old Vic Theatre, Bristol
1980	Oh, What a Lovely War!	Unknown	Theatre Royal, Bristol
1980	A Midsummer Night's Dream	Philostrate	Theatre Royal, Bristol
1981	Look Back in Anger	Jimmy Porter	Little Theatre, Bristol
1981	Dracula	Count Dracula	Little Theatre, Bristol
1982–83	Another Country	Guy Bennett	Queen's Theatre, Shaftesbury Avenue
1983–84	A Midsummer Night's Dream Romeo and Juliet	Flute; Romeo	Royal Shakespeare Company
1984	Dracula	Count Dracula	Half Moon Theatre, London
1986	Futurists	Volodya Mayakovsky	Royal National Theatre, London
1989	Hamlet	Hamlet	Royal National Theatre, London

=== Documentaries ===
Table featuring television programs with Day-Lewis
Year	Title	Role	Notes
2002	Forever Ealing	Narrator	Voice
2010	A Man's Story	Self	Cameo
2012	Access to the Danger Zone	Narrator	Voice
2014	And the Oscar Goes To...	Self	
2017	Spielberg	Self	Interviewee
2021	Daniel Day-Lewis: The Hollywood Genius	Self	Subject
2025	Mr. Scorsese	Self	Interviewee, 3 episodes

=== Music ===
Table featuring music with Daniel Day-Lewis
Year	Title	Role
2005	The Ballad of Jack and Rose	Original score producer
2009	Nine	Performer on "Guido's Song", "I Can't Make This Movie"

== Awards and nominations ==
Day-Lewis is the first person to receive three Academy Awards for Best Actor, the third male actor to win three competitive Academy Awards for acting, and the sixth performer overall to do so. (Note: Day-Lewis was only after Katharine Hepburn (who has four in total), Walter Brennan, Ingrid Bergman, Jack Nicholson, and Meryl Streep.) Additionally, he has received four BAFTA Awards for Best Actor in a Leading Role, three Actor Awards for Outstanding Performance by a Male Actor in a Leading Role and two Golden Globe Awards for Best Actor in a Motion Picture – Drama. In 2014, Day-Lewis received a knighthood for services to drama.

== See also ==
- Lists of knights bachelor
- List of people on the postage stamps of Ireland
- List of actors in Royal Shakespeare Company productions
- List of Academy Award records
- List of Academy Award winners and nominees from Great Britain
- List of Academy Award winners and nominees from Ireland
- List of oldest and youngest Academy Award winners and nominees — Youngest winners for Best Lead Actor
- List of actors with Academy Award nominations
- List of actors with more than one Academy Award nomination in the acting categories
- List of actors with two or more Academy Awards in acting categories
- List of superlative Academy Award winners and nominees
- List of Jewish Academy Award winners and nominees
- List of Golden Globe winners

== Notes ==
Awards and achievements
Preceded by Dustin Hoffman for Rain Man	Academy Award for Best Actor; 1989 for My Left Foot	Succeeded by Jeremy Irons for Reversal of Fortune
Preceded by Forest Whitaker for The Last King of Scotland	Academy Award for Best Actor; 2007 for There Will Be Blood	Succeeded by Sean Penn for Milk
Preceded by Jean Dujardin for The Artist	Academy Award for Best Actor; 2012 for Lincoln	Succeeded by Matthew McConaughey for Dallas Buyers Club
