= Stiller & Meara: Nothing Is Lost =

- Release poster
- Directed by: Ben Stiller
- Produced by: Ben Stiller; John Lesher; Geoffrey Richman; Lizz Morhaim
- Edited by: Adam Kurnitz
- Distributed by: Apple TV+
- Release dates: October 5, 2025 (NYFF); October 24, 2025 (United States)
- Running time: 98 minutes
- Country: United States
- Language: English

Stiller & Meara: Nothing Is Lost is a 2025 American documentary film directed by Ben Stiller about the Stiller and Meara comedic partnership of his parents, Jerry Stiller and Anne Meara.

The film had its world premiere at the 2025 New York Film Festival on October 5. It was released in select theaters on October 17, followed by its global release on Apple TV+ on October 24.

== Reception ==
On the review aggregator website Rotten Tomatoes, 93% of 43 critics' reviews are positive, with an average rating of 7.9/10. The website's consensus reads: "An affectionate and deeply personal exploration of a comedic power couple, Nothing is Lost is a fitting tribute from director Ben Stiller to his parents." Metacritic, which uses a weighted average, assigned the film a score of 75 out of 100, based on 13 critics, indicating "generally favorable" reviews.

Owen Gleiberman of Variety called it "a very good film".

Jourdain Searles of RogerEbert.com gave the film three out of four stars and wrote that it's "a fascinating snapshot of American comedy history, illustrating how much the industry has evolved over time."
