= Unstaged =

Series of concert films

Unstaged (also known as American Express Unstaged or Unstaged: An Original Series from American Express) is a series of individual concert films sponsored by American Express. The live performances by various artists are filmed by the various directors listed below and are usually streamed live on the artists' official VEVO channel on YouTube. In addition, Unstaged has also produced non-concert programs including fashion shows and the Emmy Award winning The Taylor Swift Experience, which gave viewers access to a customizable 360° view of the music video for "Blank Space". Since 2020, instead of being broadcast live, all films have been pre-recorded instead due to the COVID-19 pandemic.

Title	Director	Release date	Type of show
Arcade Fire	Terry Gilliam	August 5, 2010	Live concert
John Legend & The Roots	Spike Lee	September 23, 2010	Live concert
Sugarland	Kenny Ortega	October 12, 2010	Live concert
Duran Duran: Unstaged	David Lynch	March 23, 2011	Live concert
My Morning Jacket	Todd Haynes	May 31, 2011	Live concert
Coldplay	Anton Corbijn	October 26, 2011	Live concert
Mary J. Blige: My Life	Adam Shankman	November 17, 2011	Live concert
Jay Z		March 12, 2012	Live concert
Jack White	Gary Oldman	April 27, 2012	Live concert
Usher	Hamish Hamilton	June 11, 2012	Live concert
Kenny Chesney	Jonathan Demme	June 12, 2012	Live concert
The Killers	Werner Herzog	September 18, 2012	Live concert
Vampire Weekend	Steve Buscemi	April 28 2013	Live concert
Kings of Leon	Fred Armisen	August 13, 2013	Live concert
Rebecca Minkoff (ft. Janelle Monáe)		September 6, 2013	Live fashion show
Pharrell Williams	Spike Lee	June 3, 2014	Live concert
Tim McGraw	Bennett Miller	September 16, 2014	Live concert
DVF (ft. St. Vincent)		February 9, 2014	Live fashion show
The Taylor Swift Experience	Joseph Kahn	November 1, 2014	Interactive app
Disclosure	Alex Coletti	September 30, 2015	Live concert
Dead & Company	Brett Ratner	November 7, 2015	Live concert
Ellie Goulding	Scarlett Johansson	November 11, 2015	Live concert
Alicia	Aggressive	September 18, 2020	Pre-recorded concert
Sam Smith		October 30, 2020	Pre-recorded concert
Studio 2054	Liz Clare	November 27, 2020	Pre-recorded concert
Wonder: The Experience	Paul Caslin	December 6, 2020	Pre-recorded concert
Maroon 5	Sophie Muller	March 30 and 31, 2021	Pre-recorded concert
SZA		June 17, 2021	Pre-recorded concert
Lizzo		December 4, 2021	Pre-recorded concert
