= List of awards and nominations received by Daniel Day-Lewis =

Daniel Day-Lewis awards and nominations
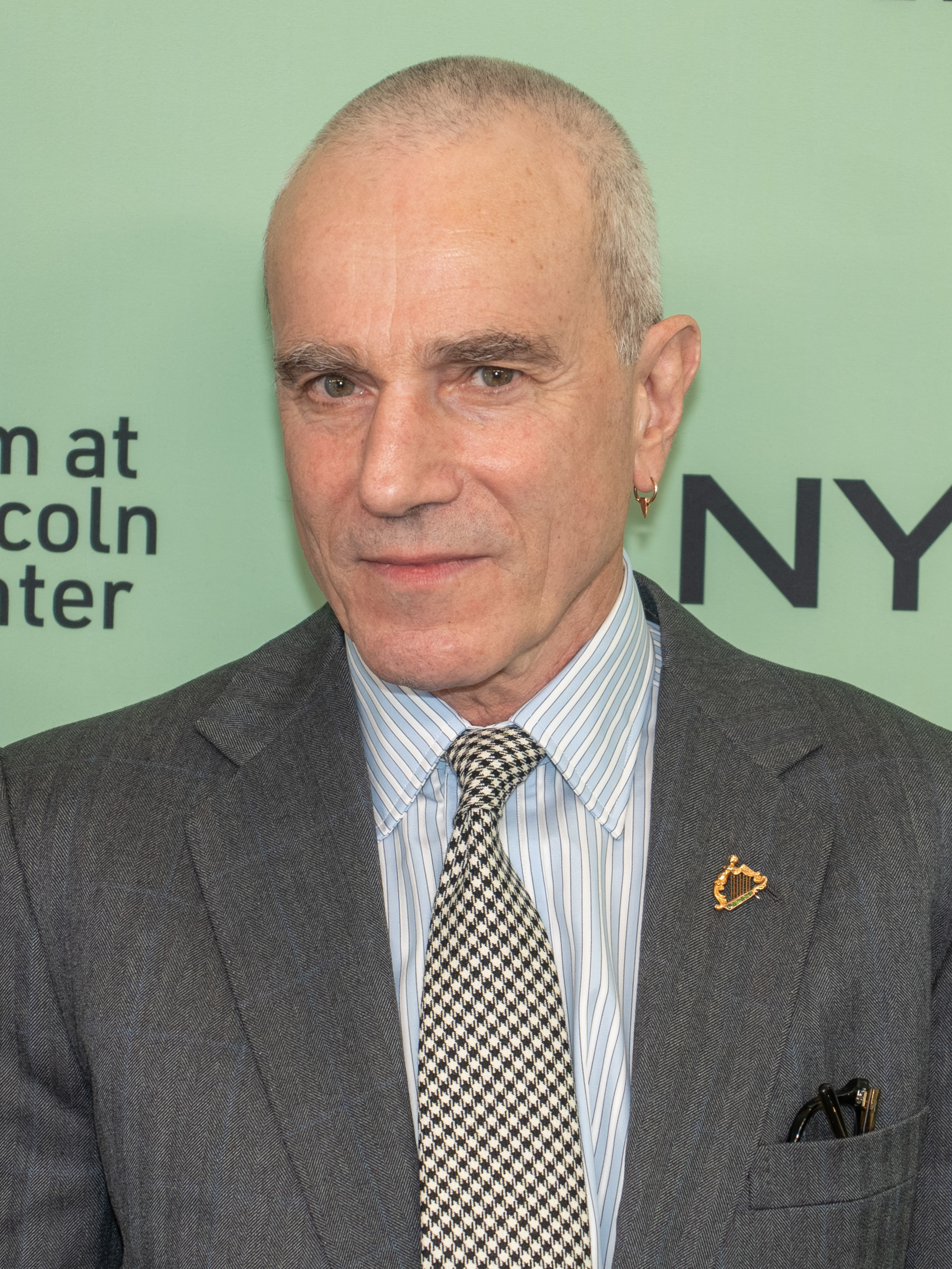
- Day-Lewis in 2025
Awards and nominations
Award	Wins	Nominations
Academy Awards	3	6
BAFTA Awards	4	7
Critics' Choice Awards	3	6
Golden Globe Awards	2	8
Actor Awards	3	5

Totals (Note: Certain award groups do not simply award one winner. They acknowledge several different recipients, have runners-up, and have third place. Since this is a specific recognition and is different from losing an award, runner-up mentions are considered wins in this award tally. For simplification and to avoid errors, each award in this list has been presumed to have had a prior nomination.)
- Wins: 139
- Nominations: 212

Daniel Day-Lewis is an English-Irish actor known for his intense and diverse roles on film. He has received several accolades including three Academy Awards, four British Academy Film Awards, two Golden Globe Awards, three Actor Awards, and three Critics' Choice Movie Awards.

He won a record three Academy Awards for Best Actor, for playing Christy Brown in Jim Sheridan's biographical drama My Left Foot (1989), an oil tycoon in the Paul Thomas Anderson's epic period drama There Will Be Blood (2007), and Abraham Lincoln in Steven Spielberg's historical drama Lincoln (2012). He was also Oscar-nominated for his roles as Gerry Conlon in Sheridan's drama In the Name of the Father (1993), Bill the Butcher in Martin Scorsese's historical drama Gangs of New York (2002), and an obsessive dressmaker in Anderson's romance Phantom Thread (2017).

Day-Lewis won four BAFTA Awards for Best Actor in a Leading Role for his performances in My Left Foot (1989), Gangs of New York (2002), There Will Be Blood (2007), and Lincoln (2012). He won the Golden Globe Award for Best Actor in a Motion Picture – Drama twice, for There Will Be Blood and Lincoln. He received the Actor Award for Outstanding Performance by a Male Actor in a Leading Role and the Critics' Choice Movie Award for Best Actor thrice, for his performances in Gangs of New York, There Will Be Blood, and Lincoln.

According to the online media database IMDb, Day-Lewis has won 139 acting awards and received 212 nominations overall in his career.

== Major associations ==
=== Academy Awards ===
Year	Category	Nominated work	Result	Ref.
1990	Best Actor	My Left Foot	Won	
1994	Best Actor	In the Name of the Father	Nominated	
2003	Best Actor	Gangs of New York	Nominated	
2008	Best Actor	There Will Be Blood	Won	
2013	Best Actor	Lincoln	Won	
2018	Best Actor	Phantom Thread	Nominated	

=== BAFTA Awards ===
British Academy Film Awards
Year	Category	Nominated work	Result	Ref.
1990	Best Actor in a Leading Role	My Left Foot	Won	
1992	Best Actor in a Leading Role	The Last of the Mohicans	Nominated	
1994	Best Actor in a Leading Role	In the Name of the Father	Nominated	
2003	Best Actor in a Leading Role	Gangs of New York	Won	
2008	Best Actor in a Leading Role	There Will Be Blood	Won	
2013	Best Actor in a Leading Role	Lincoln	Won	
2018	Best Actor in a Leading Role	Phantom Thread	Nominated	

=== Golden Globe Awards ===
Year	Category	Nominated work	Result	Ref.
1990	Best Actor in a Motion Picture – Drama	My Left Foot	Nominated	
1994	Best Actor in a Motion Picture – Drama	In the Name of the Father	Nominated	
1998	Best Actor in a Motion Picture – Drama	The Boxer	Nominated	
2003	Best Actor in a Motion Picture – Drama	Gangs of New York	Nominated	
2008	Best Actor in a Motion Picture – Drama	There Will Be Blood	Won	
2010	Best Actor in a Motion Picture – Musical or Comedy	Nine	Nominated	
2013	Best Actor in a Motion Picture – Drama	Lincoln	Won	
2018	Best Actor in a Motion Picture – Drama	Phantom Thread	Nominated	

=== Actor Awards ===
Year	Category	Nominated work	Result	Ref.
2003	Outstanding Male Actor in a Leading Role	Gangs of New York	Won	
2008	Outstanding Male Actor in a Leading Role	There Will Be Blood	Won	
2010	Outstanding Cast in a Motion Picture	Nine	Nominated	
2013	Outstanding Cast in a Motion Picture	Lincoln	Nominated	
2013	Outstanding Male Actor in a Leading Role	Lincoln	Won	

== Other awards and nominations ==
=== Critics' Choice Movie Awards ===
Year	Category	Nominated work	Result	Ref.
2003	Best Actor	Gangs of New York	Won	
2008	Best Actor	There Will Be Blood	Won	
2010	Best Acting Ensemble	Nine	Nominated	
2013	Best Actor	Lincoln	Won	
2013	Best Acting Ensemble	Lincoln	Nominated	
2018	Best Actor	Phantom Thread	Nominated	

=== Los Angeles Film Critics Association ===
Year	Category	Nominated work	Result	Ref.
1989	Best Actor	My Left Foot	Won	
2002	Best Actor	Gangs of New York	Won	
2007	Best Actor	There Will Be Blood	Won	

=== National Society of Film Critics ===
Year	Category	Nominated work	Result	Ref.
1990	Best Actor	My Left Foot	Won	
2008	Best Actor	There Will Be Blood	Won	
2013	Best Actor	Lincoln	Won	

=== New York Film Critics Circle ===
Year	Category	Nominated work	Result	Ref.
1987	Best Supporting Actor	A Room with a View & My Beautiful Laundrette	Won	
1990	Best Actor	My Left Foot	Won	
2003	Best Actor	Gangs of New York	Won	
2008	Best Actor	There Will Be Blood	Won	
2013	Best Actor	Lincoln	Won	

=== Satellite Awards ===
Year	Category	Nominated work	Result	Ref.
2003	Best Actor in a Motion Picture – Drama	Gangs of New York	Won	
2009	Best Actor in a Motion Picture – Musical or Comedy	Nine	Nominated	
2009	Best Cast – Motion Picture	Nine	Won	
2012	Best Actor – Motion Picture	Lincoln	Nominated	
2018	Best Actor – Motion Picture	Phantom Thread	Nominated	

=== Toronto Film Critics Association ===
Year	Category	Nominated work	Result	Ref.
2002	Best Actor	Gangs of New York	Runner-Up	
2012	Best Actor	Lincoln	Runner-Up	
2017	Best Actor	Phantom Thread	Won	

=== Vancouver Film Critics Circle ===
Year	Category	Nominated work	Result	Ref.
2003	Best Actor	Gangs of New York	Won	
2007	Best Actor	There Will Be Blood	Won	
2012	Best Actor	Lincoln	Nominated	
2017	Best Actor	Phantom Thread	Won	

== Records and achievements ==
Award	Details		
Award	Record/Achievement	Film	Date Achieved
Academy Awards	The Most awards for Best Actor – 3	My Left Foot	February 24, 2013
Academy Awards	The Most awards for Best Actor – 3	There Will Be Blood	February 24, 2013
Academy Awards	The Most awards for Best Actor – 3	Lincoln	February 24, 2013
Miscellaneous	Won all five major film awards for one performance	There Will Be Blood	February 24, 2008
Miscellaneous	Won all five major film awards for one performance	Lincoln	February 24, 2013
