= Anemone (film) =

- Theatrical release poster
- Directed by: Ronan Day-Lewis
- Written by: Ronan Day-Lewis; Daniel Day-Lewis
- Produced by: Dede Gardner; Jeremy Kleiner
- Starring: Daniel Day-Lewis; Sean Bean; Samantha Morton
- Cinematography: Ben Fordesman
- Edited by: Nathan Nugent
- Music by: Bobby Krlic
- Production company: Plan B Entertainment
- Distributed by: Focus Features (United States); Universal Pictures (International)
- Release dates: September 28, 2025 (NYFF); October 3, 2025 (United States); November 7, 2025 (United Kingdom)
- Running time: 126 minutes
- Countries: United Kingdom; United States
- Language: English
- Budget: $14 million
- Box office: $1.6 million

Anemone is a 2025 American psychological drama film directed by Ronan Day-Lewis, in his feature directorial debut, from a screenplay he co-wrote with his father, Daniel Day-Lewis, who also stars in the lead role. A co-production between the United Kingdom and the United States, it features Day-Lewis's return to acting for the first time since Phantom Thread in 2017, alongside Sean Bean and Samantha Morton in supporting roles. It follows a troubled recluse whose estranged brother arrives to convince him to come home and reunite with his family.

The film had its world premiere at the 2025 New York Film Festival on September 28, followed by a limited theatrical release in the United States on October 3, by Focus Features, before expanding a week later on October 10, and was released by Universal Pictures in the United Kingdom on November 7.

Anemone received mixed reviews from critics, who criticized its screenplay, but praised the cinematography and performances, with many singling out the performance of Day-Lewis, welcoming his return to the industry.

== Plot ==
Jem Stoker is a retired veteran. He departs from his wife, Nessa, and son, Brian, to go in a remote forest. In the forest, he arrives at the hut of his brother Ray who is also a retired veteran having previously served in Northern Ireland. He is living in the forest as a recluse. Jem brings Ray a letter from Nessa wherein she asks Ray to come back home to talk to Brian. Brian has been sent home from the army because he ruthlessly hurt one of his colleagues.

Jem stays with Ray at the hut. Ray was married to Nessa and had left her when she was pregnant with Brian. Jem married her instead and raised Brian as his own son. Jem discovers that Ray has stored all the letters that Nessa wrote to him. There is also a miniature painting that Brian had painted in the same storage box. Jem convinces Ray to come with him, and later calls Nessa that Ray is with him and will be meeting Brian.

Nessa confronts Brian about his behaviour. She shares the story of Ray and how he was before he left her. She emphasises that Ray is a good and brave man who was troubled due to his involvement in the army during The Troubles in Northern Ireland. Brian is unconvinced by her story and still despises Ray for leaving his family.

Ray reveals to Jem that he was on a surveillance task around a shed where they had a tip-off about a bombmaker and his teenager nephew. The bomb exploded due to some fault and the bombmaker was shredded. As Ray's unit moved inwards, Ray saw the nephew lying on the floor, his body bloodied and maimed, and the bombmaker's teeth embedded in his head. He kept calling for his mother, and begged Ray to end his misery. Ray shot him, which led to an in-department enquiry and him being declared a war criminal, a label that affected him deeply. Ray was removed from service, which brought him back home to Sheffield, after which he left Nessa.

A hailstorm then strikes down both the city and the forest. In the aftermath, Ray engages Jem in a brawl, only for Jem to calm him down. Ray and Jem both return home, with Ray driving the motorcycle. Arriving at the Stoker home, he sees Nessa and Brian, and he walks toward their porch.

== Cast ==
- Daniel Day-Lewis as Ray Stoker
- Sean Bean as Jem Stoker
- Samantha Morton as Nessa Stoker
- Samuel Bottomley as Brian Stoker
- Safia Oakley-Green as Hattie

== Production ==
In September 2024, it was announced that Daniel Day-Lewis would be making his acting return after retirement in 2017 following the release of Phantom Thread. In addition to starring as Ray Stoker, Daniel co-wrote the script for Anemone with his son, Ronan Day-Lewis, who also directed the film. Samantha Morton, Samuel Bottomley, and Safia Oakley-Green also joined the cast, with Jane Petrie as costume designer and Chris Oddy as production designer.

Principal photography began on October 1, 2024, in Manchester, England. Later that month, while filming in Handbridge in Chester, production was disrupted after traffic wardens posted parking tickets on several of the 1980s prop vehicles that were parked on double-yellow lines. A spokesperson for Cheshire West and Chester Council explained that, while a request for parking technical support vehicles in restricted areas had been granted, this did not include the prop cars, and a separate request for a full road closure application during filming had been rejected as it was assessed as "being too disruptive" for residents.

In September 2025, it was announced that Bobby Krlic would compose the film's score.

== Release ==
Anemone had its world premiere at the 2025 New York Film Festival. It then was given a limited theatrical release in the United States on October 3, 2025, with a nationwide expansion on October 10, before it was released in the United Kingdom on November 7, 2025.

It was screened in the Icon section of the 2025 Stockholm International Film Festival on November 10, 2025.

== Reception ==
=== Critical response ===
On the review aggregator website Rotten Tomatoes, 52% of 145 critics' reviews are positive, with an average rating of 5.7/10. The website's consensus reads: "Returning Daniel Day-Lewis to the screen with all his ferocious talent intact, Anemone succeeds more as a showcase for its star's evergreen magnetism and debut director Ronan Day-Lewis' stylistic flair than as a cohesive drama." Metacritic, which uses a weighted average, assigned the film a score of 53 out of 100, based on 41 critics, indicating "mixed or average" reviews.

Day-Lewis' performance received critical praise. Damon Wise of Deadline notes that the film "might be a tad too long." David Rooney for The Hollywood Reporter notes that the film "marks a magnificent emergence from eight years of retirement for the great Daniel Day-Lewis."

The Guardian awarded the film three stars out of five, with Peter Bradshaw concluding: "this is a movie with, in the Scots phrase, no small opinion of itself; a movie of big scenes, big performances, big images, epiphanies and hallucinations. Not all of them work, but the presence of Day-Lewis settles and moors it."

=== Accolades ===
Award	Date of ceremony	Category	Recipient(s)	Result	Ref.
British Independent Film Awards	30 November 2025	Best Original Music	Bobby Krlic	Nominated	
British Independent Film Awards	30 November 2025	Best Sound	Steve Fanagan and Stevie Haywood	Nominated	
Camerimage	November 22, 2025	Golden Frog	Ben Fordesman	Nominated	

== See also ==
- List of The Troubles films
