= 2017 Los Angeles Film Critics Association Awards =

Annual US film awards ceremony

43rd LAFCA Awards
- Date: December 3, 2017

Highlights
- Best Picture: Call Me by Your Name

The 43rd Los Angeles Film Critics Association Awards, given by the Los Angeles Film Critics Association (LAFCA), honored the best in film for 2017.

== Winners ==
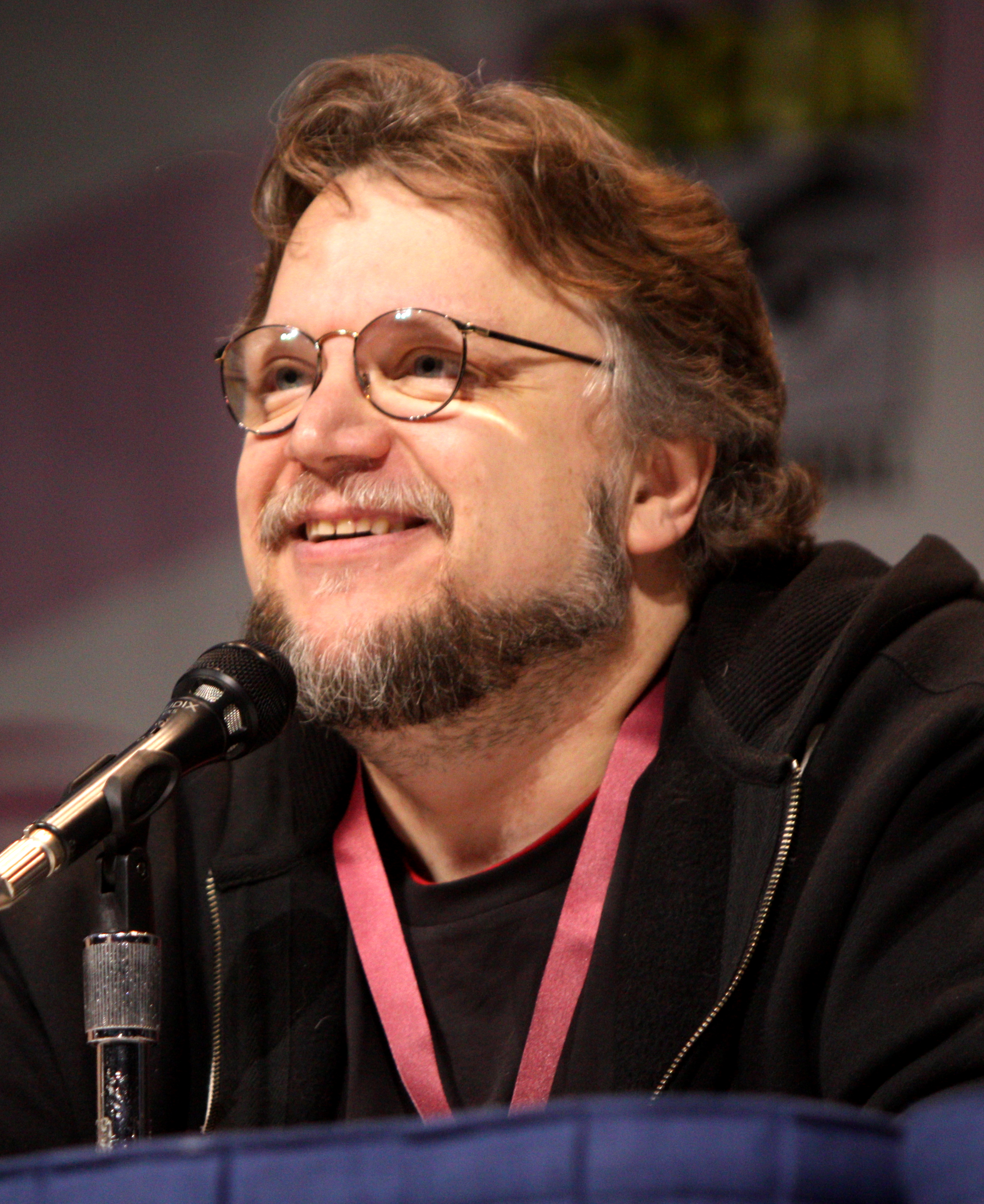
Guillermo del Toro, Best Director co-winner

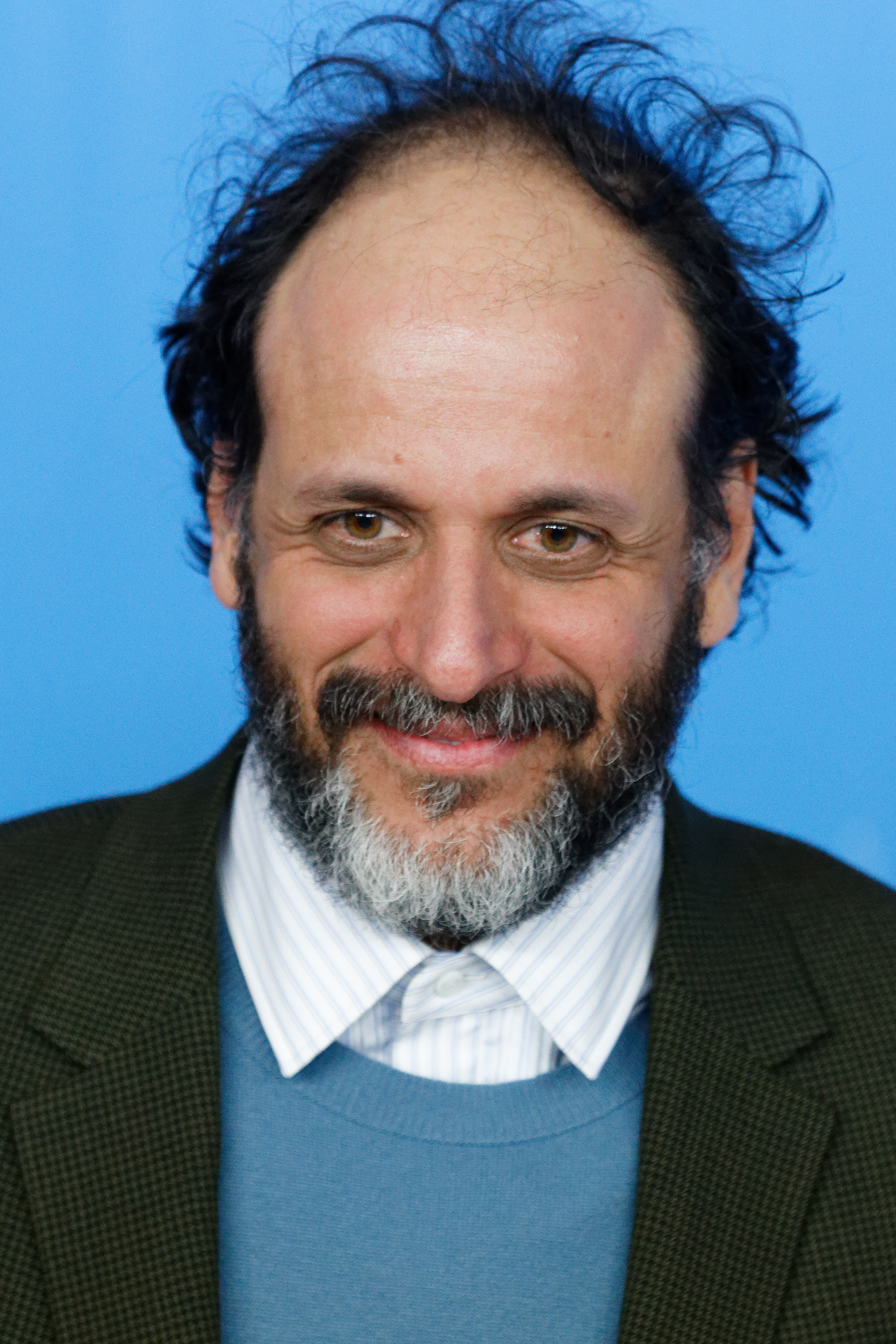
Luca Guadagnino, Best Director co-winner

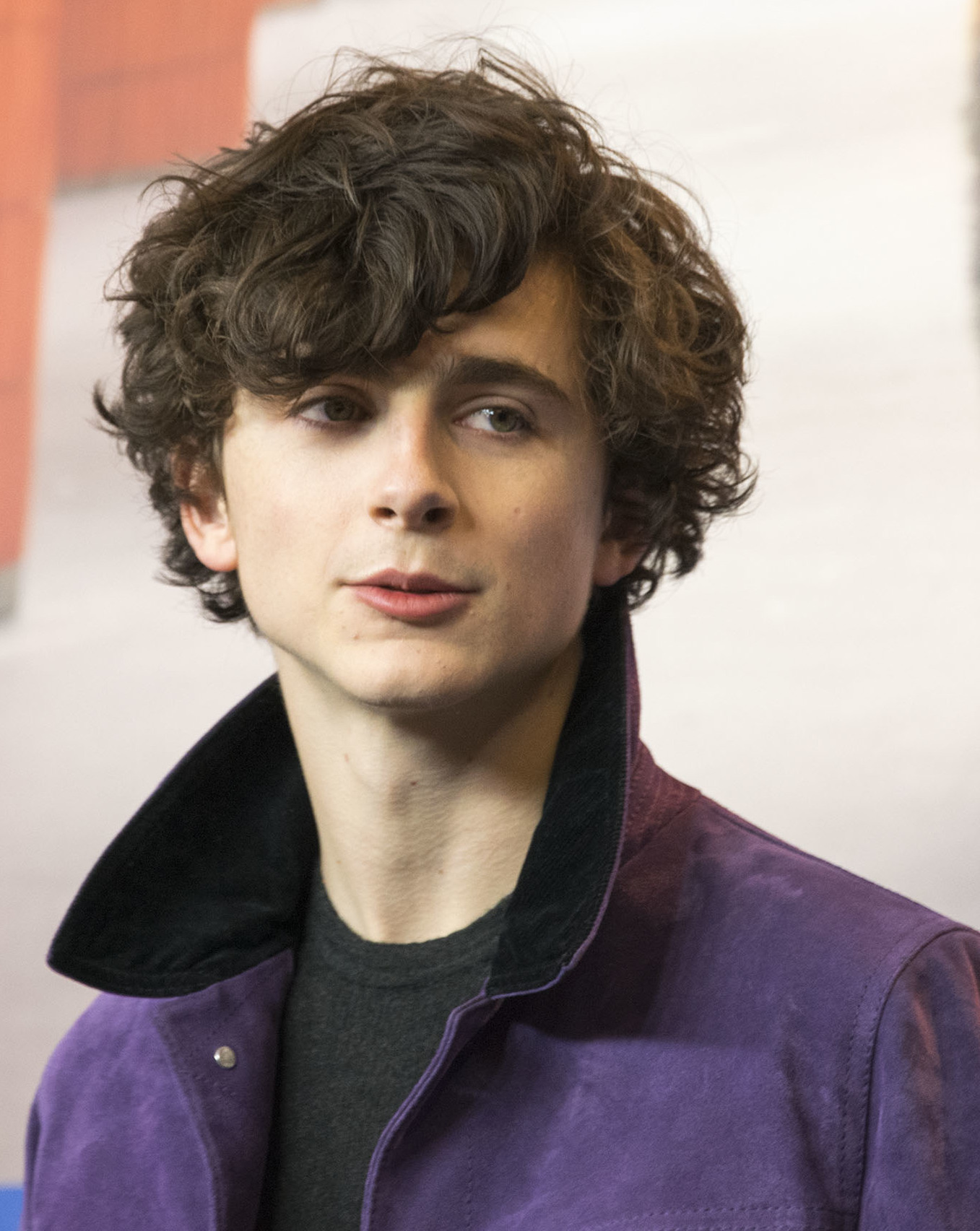
Timothée Chalamet, Best Actor winner

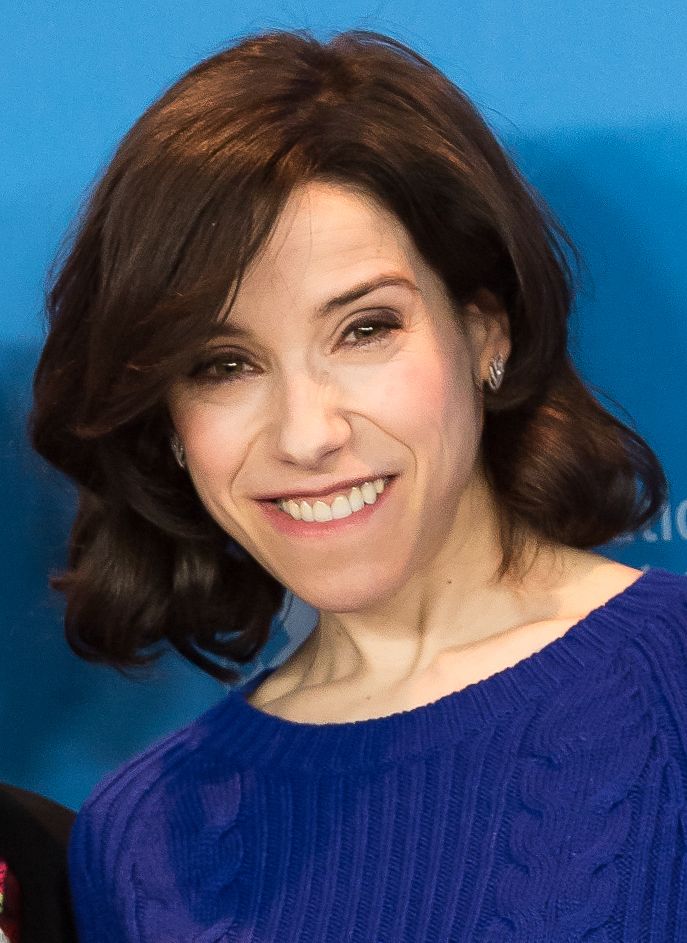
Sally Hawkins, Best Actress winner

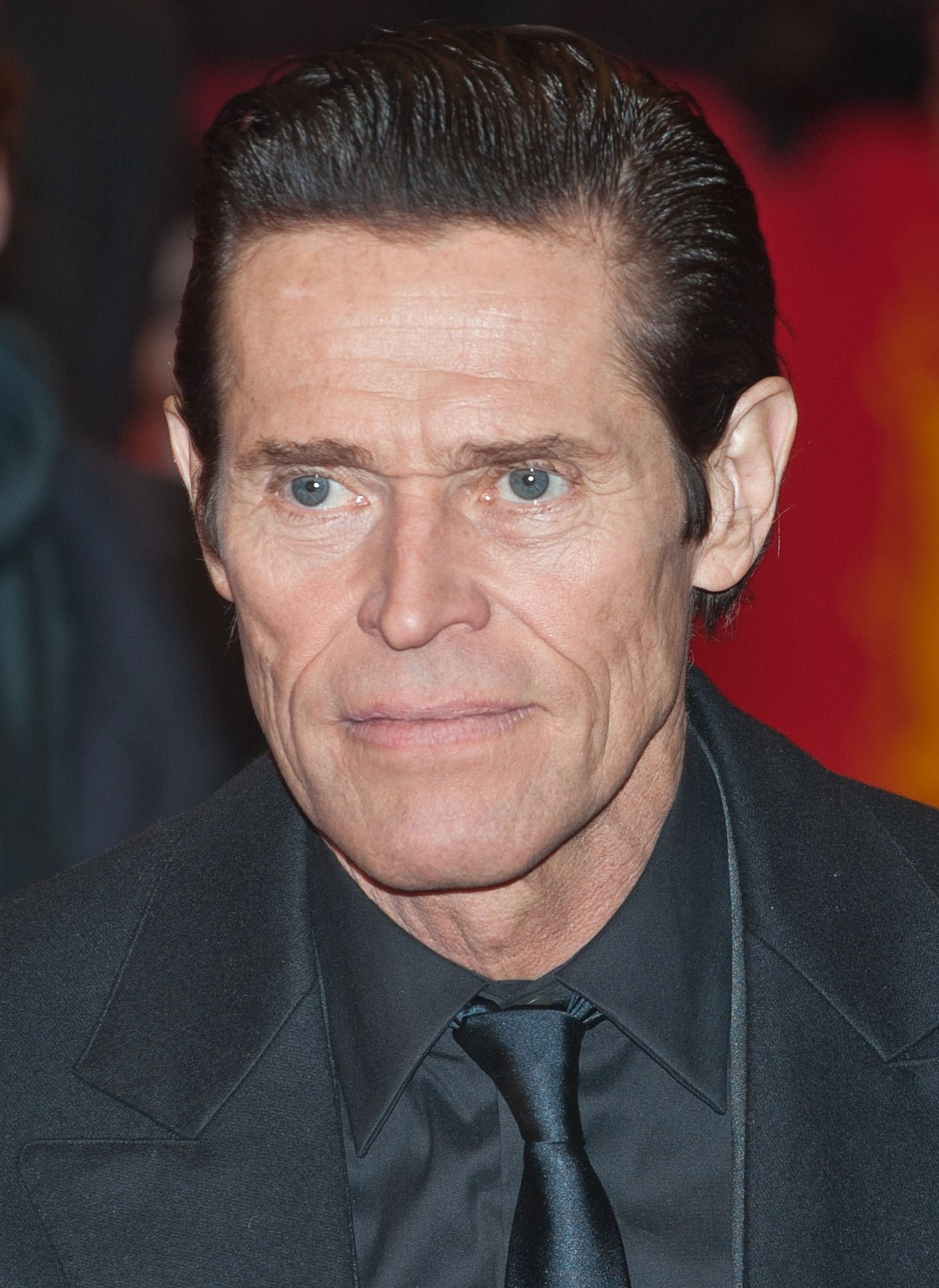
Willem Dafoe, Best Supporting Actor winner

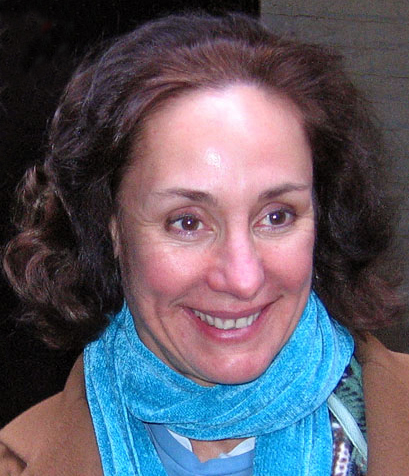
Laurie Metcalf, Best Supporting Actress winner

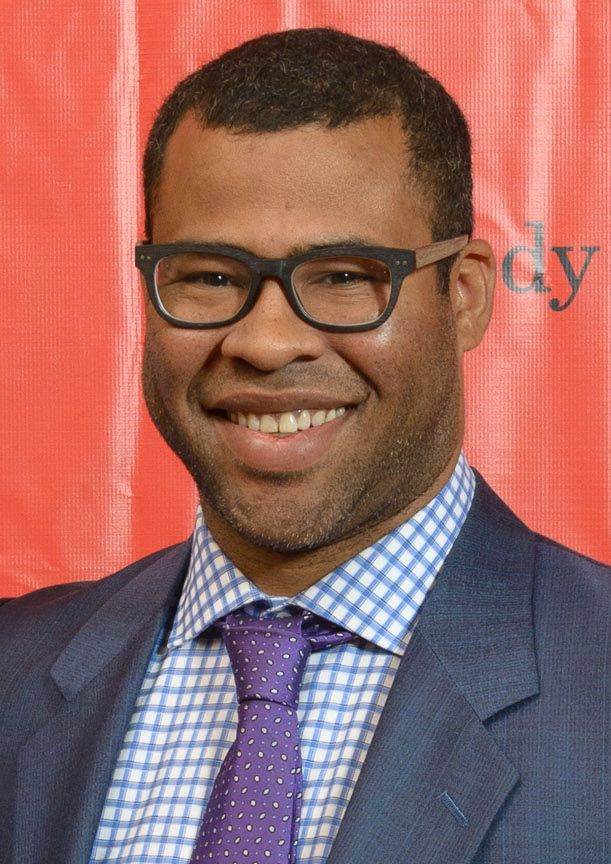
Jordan Peele, Best Screenplay winner

- Best Picture:
  - Call Me by Your Name
    - Runner-up: The Florida Project
- Best Director: (TIE)
  - Guillermo del Toro – The Shape of Water
  - Luca Guadagnino – Call Me by Your Name
- Best Actor:
  - Timothée Chalamet – Call Me by Your Name
    - Runner-up: James Franco – The Disaster Artist
- Best Actress:
  - Sally Hawkins – The Shape of Water
    - Runner-up: Frances McDormand – Three Billboards Outside Ebbing, Missouri
- Best Supporting Actor:
  - Willem Dafoe – The Florida Project
    - Runner-up: Sam Rockwell – Three Billboards Outside Ebbing, Missouri
- Best Supporting Actress:
  - Laurie Metcalf – Lady Bird
    - Runner-up: Mary J. Blige – Mudbound
- Best Screenplay:
  - Jordan Peele – Get Out
    - Runner-up: Martin McDonagh – Three Billboards Outside Ebbing, Missouri
- Best Cinematography:
  - Dan Laustsen – The Shape of Water
    - Runner-up: Roger Deakins – Blade Runner 2049
- Best Editing:
  - Lee Smith – Dunkirk
    - Runner-up: Tatiana S. Riegel – I, Tonya
- Best Production Design:
  - Dennis Gassner – Blade Runner 2049
    - Runner-up: Paul Denham Austerberry – The Shape of Water
- Best Music Score:
  - Jonny Greenwood – Phantom Thread
    - Runner-up: Alexandre Desplat – The Shape of Water
- Best Foreign Language Film: (TIE)
  - BPM (Beats per Minute) • France
  - Loveless • Russia
- Best Documentary/Non-Fiction Film:
  - Faces Places
    - Runner-up: Jane
- Best Animation:
  - The Breadwinner
    - Runner-up: Coco
- New Generation Award:
  - Greta Gerwig
- Career Achievement Award:
  - Max von Sydow
- The Douglas Edwards Experimental/Independent Film/Video Award:
  - Lee Anne Schmitt – Purge This Land
