= Sara Magenheimer =

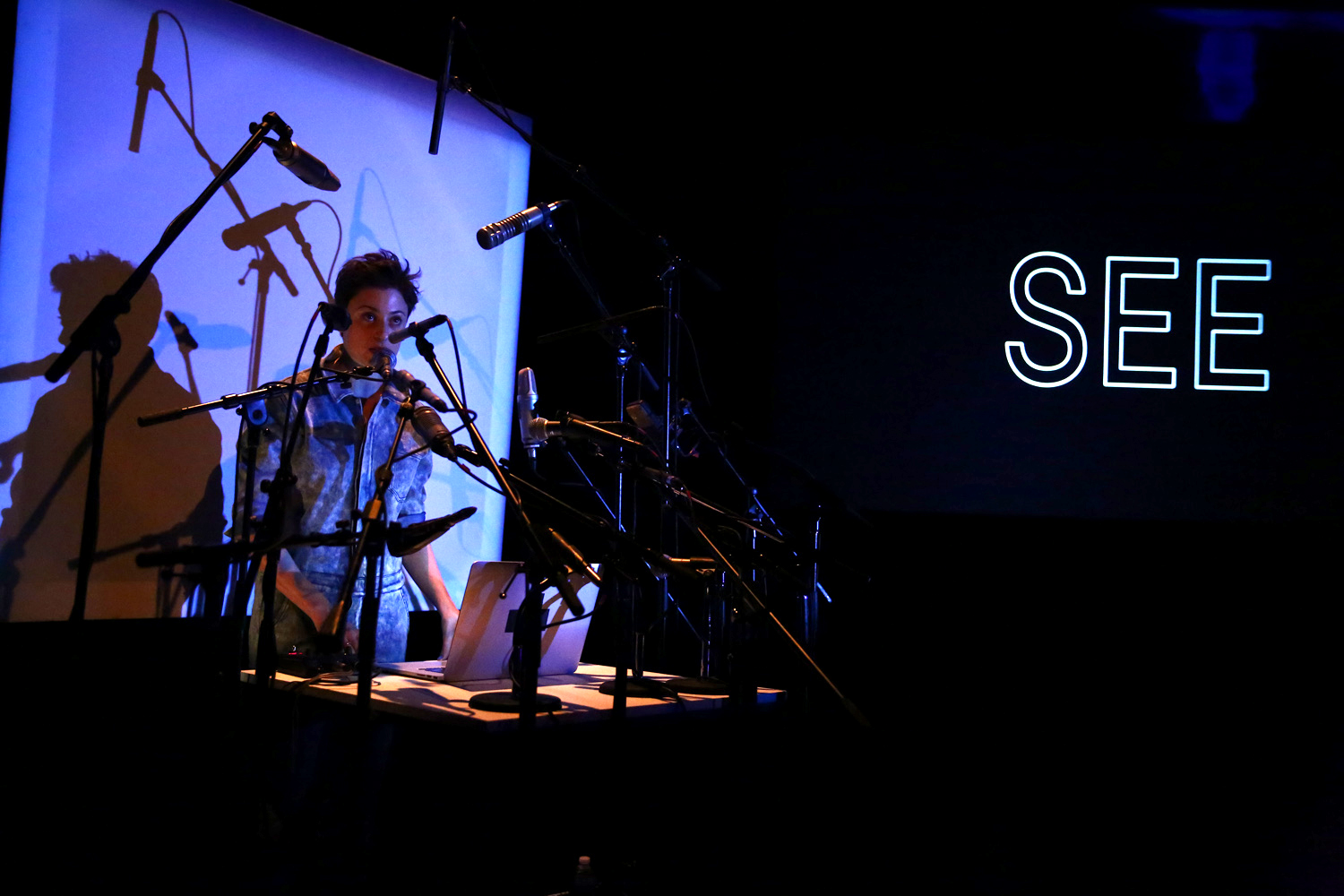
Sara Magenheimer performing inside I Collect Neglected Venoms, 2017 at The Kitchen, New York

Sara Magenheimer (born 1981, Philadelphia, Pennsylvania) is an American artist, writer and musician living and working in the Hudson Valley. Magenheimer is known for her video, writing, visual art, and sound that explores the poetics and absurdity of language.

Magenheimer works in various media such as sculpture, performance, writing, installation, and video, which she has exhibited at galleries, museums, and film festivals internationally. She teaches in the Department of New Media at SUNY Purchase. Her video work is in distribution with Video Data Bank. In 2019, Magenheimer's first book-length work of experimental writing, Beige Pursuit, was published by Wendy's Subway.

== Career ==
Magenheimer attended Tufts University and the School of the Museum of Fine Arts (SMFA), graduating in 2004 with a BA in Women's Studies and a BFA in Visual Art. After completing her undergraduate studies, Magenheimer spent a number of years as a working musician, playing drums and singing in the art rock bands WOOM and Flying. She toured extensively, supporting acts such as Deerhoof and Xiu Xiu.

In 2013, she received her M.F.A. from the Milton Avery Graduate School for the Arts at Bard College, with a concentration in Film / Video. Throughout her career, Magenheimer has focused on exploring language, time, and text across different media. She is most well known for her videos, which often combine bold and poetic arrangements of written and spoken language with images both captured by the artist and found. Her video work has been shown extensively, including screenings at the New York Film Festival, the Rotterdam International Film Festival, the Flaherty Seminar, and Images Festival in Toronto. Her videos are distributed through Video Data Bank in Chicago.

Writing in Artforum in 2014, Corrine Fitzpatrick called the 2014 two-person exhibition "Which arbitrary thing are you," with Magenheimer and painter Sadie Laska, one of the best exhibitions of the year. Fitzpatrick wrote that Magenheimer’s video and sculpture evoked early video art.

In 2017, Magenheimer had her first institutional solo exhibition, I Collect Neglected Venoms at the Kitchen in New York City. For the installation she used sculpture, video, lighting, and a custom scent to create a multi-sensory environment centered around her two-channel video Best is Man’s Breath Quality. In 2018, she exhibited NOON at the New Museum, a multi-channel video and sculptural installation. Critic Martha Schwendener reviewed NOON in the New York Times, where she wrote that "Magenheimer’s art often feels like Gertrude Stein’s work set to music (in one video, an evocatively pitched-down PJ Harvey song) and juiced up with images, like those of deer captured by surveillance cameras, primates looking into a mirror installed in a forest, or a lone piece of luggage on an airport conveyor belt, accompanied by a voice-over describing loneliness and heartbreak.” In 2022, the University Art Museum at The University of Albany commissioned Dailies, a solo exhibition of text murals, video, photo, and sculpture. In 2025, Magenheimer showed Ill-Gotten Gains at Lighthouse Works on Fisher's Island, the first survey-exhibition of her video work.

In 2019, Wendy's Subway published Beige Pursuit, Magenheimer's book-length prose poem. Writer Maxwell Paparella reviewed Beige Pursuit for The Brooklyn Rail, noting the throughline between Magenheimer's video work and her writing: “The book reads alternately like a screenplay and a long poem, its sparsely populated pages asking to be consumed slowly…Motifs from Magenheimer’s videos reappear: mirrors, manholes, fallen fruits and vegetables, songs delivered from the bath.” In BOMB, Critic Nicole Kaack similarly described Beige Pursuit as in continuity with Magenheimer's visual art practice, writing that “In sequences absurd, antic, and familiar (with an asterisk), Sara captures the punchy, fractured interior landscape of a world manicured by encoded determinism.”

Magenheimer wrote Notes on Art and Resistance A-Z following the 2016 US presidential election. It was printed in conjunction with her 2018 exhibition at The New Museum. In 2020, she wrote an essay on Miranda July’s Me, You and Everyone We Know for the liner notes of Criterion Collection's re-release of the film.

Magenheimer has also worked extensively in performance. In 2013, she received a commission from Triple Canopy and Performa for Bloopers, a collaborative performance with artists Ben Vida and Michael Bell-Smith. As part of her installation at the Kitchen, I Collect Neglected Venoms, she performed with the musician Joe Williams. Magenheimer has presented other performance work at the Museum of Modern Art, the Portland Institute for Contemporary Art and other venues.

Magenheimer has collaborated with various artists and musicians on videos. In her videos Medium, and Chimes at Noon / Balsamic Moon (2022), she worked with the artist Carol Bove to interpret Bove’s sculptures and sculptural process. She has directed music videos for Eleanor Friedberger and Grace Ives.

As an educator, Magenheimer has taught in the art and film departments of various universities such as Bennington, Columbia, Sarah Lawrence, NYU and the Bard MFA program. She has been a professor in the New Media department at SUNY Purchase since 2012.

== Awards ==
- Rauschenberg Residency on Capitva (2021)
- 53rd Ann Arbor Film Festival, Prix Devarti Award (2015)
- Artadia Award. Artadia, New York, NY (2015)
- Rema Hort Mann Foundation, Emerging Artist Grant (2014)
