= Daily Paper (clothing) =

Amsterdam-based fashion brand

- Industry: Retailer
- Founded: Amsterdam, Netherlands (2012)
- Headquarters: Netherlands
- Products: Clothing
- Website: Official website

Daily Paper is an Amsterdam-based menswear and womenswear fashion brand established in 2012.

== Overview ==
The company was founded by three friends, Hussein Suleiman, Jefferson Osei, and Abderrahmane Trabsini. In the beginning, the trio set up a blog where they occasionally sold T-shirts bearing their logo. The company subsequently grew from there. Although the blog was running in 2008, the company was founded in 2010 and established in 2012.

In 2015, they released a women's clothing parallel. They derived design ideas from scenery in Somalia and other sub-Saharan African regions. In the same year, they branched out to diversify from casual wear to athletic and sportswear. In May 2015, they began releasing limited edition silhouette jackets.
