= Duran Duran: Unstaged =

2011 concert film directed by David Lynch

- Directed by: David Lynch
- Release date: 2011
- Running time: 121 minutes

Duran Duran: Unstaged is a 2011 concert film directed by David Lynch. It is part of the Unstaged series of concert films sponsored by American Express. The film was made during a performance of the British band Duran Duran at the Mayan Theater in Los Angeles.

== Release ==
The film was released in 2011 and re-released in 2014 with a new cut.

== Reception ==
Variety praised the sound in the film but criticised the overall production, stating: "The idea of David Lynch directing a concert movie of Duran Duran remains far more exciting than the result." A review for the Toronto Star also praised the sound but was no less negative, going as far as to suggest that "had this David Lynch 'live conjuring' of a Duran Duran concert been unleashed upon unsuspecting pop fans in the 1980s, when the British popsters were in their heyday, there may have been a rebellion."
