= Office Magazine =

New York-based magazine

- Categories: Arts, culture
- First issue: 2014
- Country: United States
- Based in: New York City, New York
- Language: English
- Website: officemagazine.net

Office Magazine is an arts and culture magazine based in New York City. It was founded in 2014.
