= Lee Anne Schmitt =

Lee Anne Schmitt is an American filmmaker. She directed Purge This Land, which won the 2017 Los Angeles Film Critics Association Award for best independent film, and Evidence. She is a Guggenheim fellow.
