= Ronan Day-Lewis =

British-American filmmaker (born 1998)

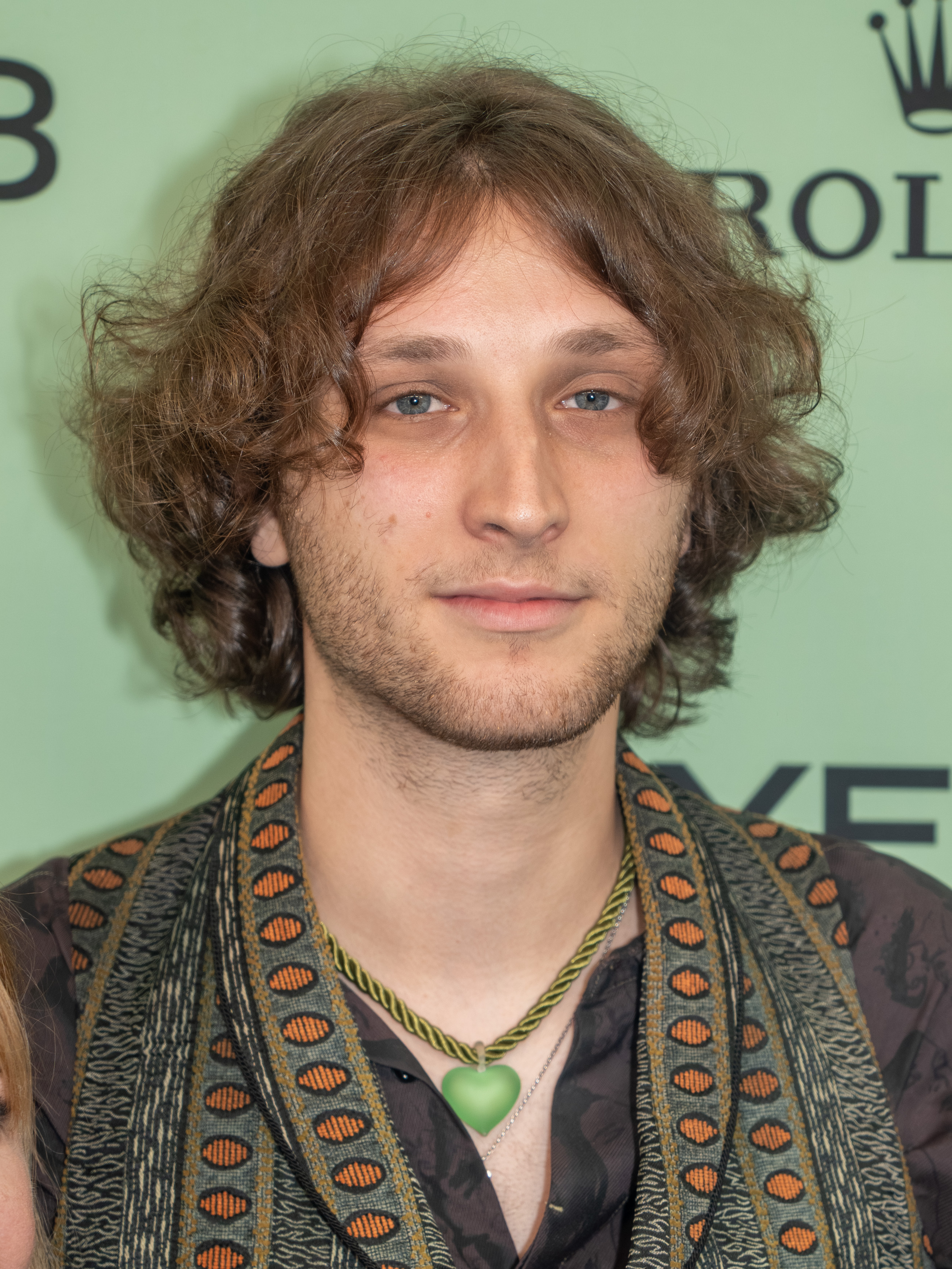
- Day-Lewis at the 2025 New York Film Festival
- Born: 14 June 1998 (age 28)
- Education: Yale University
- Occupations: Film director, screenwriter
- Parents: Daniel Day-Lewis (father); Rebecca Miller (mother)
- Relatives: Arthur Miller (grandfather); Cecil Day-Lewis (grandfather)

Ronan Day-Lewis (born 14 June 1998) is an American filmmaker. Day-Lewis is the son of actor Daniel Day-Lewis and filmmaker Rebecca Miller. He has a BA from Yale University. Day-Lewis is known for directing Anemone (2025) starring and co-written by his father Daniel. He is also an artist. He had a solo exhibition in Hong Kong titled "That Summer We All Saw Them".
