= Michael Bell-Smith =

American artist

Michael Bell-Smith is an assistant professor of new media at Purchase College, State University of New York. He was an Eyebeam resident in 2002. Examples of his work have been shown at the Hirshhorn Museum and Sculpture Garden in Washington, D.C., at the New Museum of Contemporary Art in New York, and at the San Francisco Museum of Modern Art.
