= Artfuck: A Compilation of Rarities (1980–1983) =

Compilation album by Virgin Prunes
- Released: 1993
- Recorded: August 1980 – April 1983
- Genre: Post-punk, gothic rock
- Length: 61:29
- Label: New Rose
- Producer: Virgin Prunes

Virgin Prunes chronology
The Hidden Lie (Live in Paris 6/6/86) (1987)	Artfuck: A Compilation of Rarities (1980–1983) (1993)	Sons Find Devils (1998)

Artfuck: A Compilation of Rarities (1980–1983) is a compilation album by the Irish post-punk band Virgin Prunes. Released on New Rose Records in 1993, it marked the first time the "Twenty Tens" and "Moments and Mine" singles had been issued on CD.

== Track listing ==
All tracks are written by Virgin Prunes.

No.	Title	Original album (date)	Length
1.	"Twenty Tens (I've Been Smoking All Night)"	"Twenty Tens" 7" single (1981)	2:27
2.	"Revenge"	"Twenty Tens" 7" single (1981)	3:33
3.	"The Children Are Crying"	"Twenty Tens" 7" single (1981)	5:12
4.	"...greylight"	"Twenty Tens" 7" single (1981)	4:18
5.	"In the Greylight"	"Moments and Mine" 7" single (1981)	2:44
6.	"War"	"Moments and Mine" 7" single (1981)	1:59
7.	"Moments and Mine (Despite Straight Lines)"	"Moments and Mine" 7" single (1981)	4:27
8.	"Red Nettle"	NME / Rough Trade C81 compilation (1981)	2:18
9.	"Mad Bird in the Wood"	Over the Rainbow compilation (1985)	4:18
10.	"Jigsawmentallama"	Over the Rainbow compilation (1985)	6:21
11.	"The King of Junk"	Over the Rainbow compilation (1985)	2:49
12.	"Just a Lovesong"	Over the Rainbow compilation (1985)	3:01
13.	"The Happy Dead"	Over the Rainbow compilation (1985)	13:37
14.	"Third Secret"	Perspectives and Distortion compilation (1981)	4:25

== Personnel ==
Virgin Prunes

- Mary D'Nellon – drums, production
- Dik Evans – guitar, production
- Gavin Friday – vocals, production
- Guggi – vocals, production
- Strongman – bass guitar, production

== Release history ==
Region	Date	Label	Format	Catalog
France	1993	New Rose	CD	422476
