= Baby Turns Blue =

Single by Virgin Prunes

from the album ...If I Die, I Die
- B-side: "Yeo", "Chance of a Lifetime"
- Released: 9 October 1982
- Recorded: Berry Street Studio and Windmill Lane Studios
- Genre: Post-punk, gothic rock
- Length: 3:43 (single version) 5:04 (Album version)
- Label: Rough Trade
- Songwriter: Virgin Prunes
- Producers: Colin Newman, Virgin Prunes

Virgin Prunes singles chronology
"Pagan Lovesong" (1982)	"Baby Turns Blue" (1982)	"Love Lasts Forever" (1986)

"Baby Turns Blue" is a single by the Irish post-punk band Virgin Prunes, released on 9 October 1982 by Rough Trade Records. The remixed 12" version was retitled The Faculties of a Broken Heart.

== Formats and track listing ==
All songs written by the Virgin Prunes

UK 7" single (RT 119)

1. "Baby Turns Blue" – 3:43
2. "Yeo" – 2:17

UK 12" single (RT 119T)

1. "The Faculties of a Broken Heart (What Should We Do If Baby Turns Blue)"
2. "Chance of a Lifetime"
3. "Yeo"

== Personnel ==
Virgin Prunes

- Mary D'Nellon – drums
- Dik Evans – guitar
- Gavin Friday – vocals
- Guggi – vocals
- Strongman – bass guitar

Technical personnel

- Kevin Maloney – engineering
- Colin Newman – production
- Steve Parker – engineering
- Virgin Prunes – production
- The Yeomen – production (B-side)

== Charts ==
Charts (1982)	Peak position
UK Indie Chart	15
