= Over the Rainbow (A Compilation of Rarities 1981–1983) =

Compilation album by Virgin Prunes
- Released: April 1985
- Recorded: August 1980 – April 1983
- Genre: Post-punk, gothic rock
- Length: 58:20
- Label: Baby
- Producer: Virgin Prunes

Virgin Prunes chronology
| A New Form of Beauty Parts 1–4 (1983) | Over the Rainbow (A Compilation of Rarities 1981–1983) (1985) | The Moon Looked Down and Laughed (1986) |

Over the Rainbow (A Compilation of Rarities 1981–1983) is a compilation album by the Irish rock band Virgin Prunes. It was issued by Baby Records in April 1985. In 1986, the album was issued on CD augmented with the studio recordings from Hérésie.

== Track listing ==
All tracks are written by Virgin Prunes.

Side one
| No. | Title | Original album (date) | Length |
|---|---|---|---|
| 1. | "Down the Memory Lane" | Hérésie EP (1982) | 3:17 |
| 2. | "Red Nettle" | C81 compilation (1981) | 2:19 |
| 3. | "Mad Bird in the Wood" | Dokument: Ten Highlights in the History of Popular Music 1981>1982 (1982) | 4:22 |
| 4. | "Jigsawmentallama" | previously unreleased | 6:25 |
| 5. | "The King of Junk" | previously unreleased | 2:52 |

Side two
| No. | Title | Original album (date) | Length |
|---|---|---|---|
| 1. | "Just a Love Song" | previously unreleased | 3:02 |
| 2. | "The Happy Dead" | previously unreleased | 13:46 |
| 3. | "Third Secret" | Perspectives and Distortion compilation (1981) | 4:31 |

CD bonus tracks
| No. | Title | Original album (date) | Length |
|---|---|---|---|
| 9. | "We Love Deirdre" | Hérésie EP (1982) | 1:18 |
| 10. | "Rhetoric" | Hérésie EP (1982) | 7:19 |
| 11. | "Man on the Corner" | Hérésie EP (1982) | 2:24 |
| 12. | "Nisam Lo" | Hérésie EP (1982) | 1:28 |
| 13. | "Loved One" | Hérésie EP (1982) | 4:29 |
| 14. | "Go't' Away Deirdre" | Hérésie EP (1982) | 0:48 |

== Personnel ==
Virgin Prunes

- Mary D'Nellon – drums, production
- Dik Evans – guitar, production
- Gavin Friday – vocals, production
- Guggi – vocals, production
- Strongman – bass guitar, production

== Charts ==
| Chart (1985) | Peak position |
|---|---|
| UK Indie Chart | 22 |

== Release history ==
| Region | Date | Label | Format | Catalog |
|---|---|---|---|---|
| France | 1985 | Baby | LP | Baby 002 |
| France | 1985 | Baby | Cassette | BABY t002 |
| France | 1986 | Baby | CD | Baby 002 CD |
