= A New Form of Beauty =

Compilation album by Virgin Prunes
- Released: 1983
- Recorded: July – November 8, 1981
- Genre: Post-punk, gothic rock
- Length: 92:10
- Label: Rough Trade
- Producer: Virgin Prunes

Virgin Prunes chronology
Hérésie (1982)	A New Form of Beauty (1983)	Over the Rainbow (A Compilation of Rarities 1981–1983) (1985)

Professional ratings
Review scores
Source	Rating
AllMusic	3.5/5 stars

A New Form of Beauty Parts 1–4 is a 1983 compilation album by Irish post-punk band Virgin Prunes. It collected parts 1 through 4 of the A New Form of Beauty project, which were issued by Rough Trade Records during 1981 and 1982.

== History ==
A New Form of Beauty 1 (1981), issued as a 7" single, featured the songs "Sandpaper Lullaby" and "Sleep / Fantasy Dreams". It was followed by the 10" single A New Form of Beauty 2 (1981), which featured "Come to Daddy" and two other tracks. A New Form of Beauty 3 (1981) was a four-song 12" EP consisting of "Beast (Seven Bastard Suck)" on one side, and three tracks on the other side, subtitled "The Slow Children".

The final musical installment in the series, A New Form of Beauty 4 (1982), was a cassette release consisting of "Din Glorious", a mixture of previous A New Form of Beauty tracks and taped sounds recorded at the A New Form of Beauty 5 exhibition at the Douglas Hyde Gallery at Trinity College Dublin on 8 November 1981.

The project also included two additional pieces, the unpublished book A New Form of Beauty 6 and the unreleased film A New Form of Beauty 7.

In 1993, an abridged remastered version was issued by French label New Rose Records that omitted part 4 of the series. This abridged version was later issued in 2004 in the United States by Mute Records. That same year, The Grey Area reissued the complete version in the U.K.

== Track listing ==
All tracks are written by Virgin Prunes

Side 1
No.	Title	Length
1.	"Sandpaper Lullaby" (from A New Form of Beauty 1, 1981)	3:05
2.	"Sleep / Fantasy Dreams" (from A New Form of Beauty 1, 1981)	2:45
3.	"Come to Daddy" (from A New Form of Beauty 2, 1981)	9:55
4.	"Sweet Home (Under White Clouds)" (from A New Form of Beauty 2, 1981)	7:00
5.	"Sad World" (from A New Form of Beauty 2, 1981)	5:36

Side 2
No.	Title	Length
1.	"Beast (Seven Bastard Suck)" (from A New Form of Beauty 3, 1981)	4:17
2.	"Abbágall" (from A New Form of Beauty 3, 1981)	3:56
3.	"Brain Damage" (from A New Form of Beauty 3, 1981)	3:52
4.	"No Birds to Fly" (from A New Form of Beauty 3, 1981)	4:06

Side 3
No.	Title	Length
1.	"Come to Daddy" (from A New Form of Beauty 4, 1982)	4:17
2.	"Delay Box" (from A New Form of Beauty 4, 1982)	3:56
3.	"Suck Me Baby" (from A New Form of Beauty 4, 1982)	3:52
4.	"Bodhran" (from A New Form of Beauty 4, 1982)	4:06
5.	"The Forest" (from A New Form of Beauty 4, 1982)	3:21
6.	"Theme for Thought" (from A New Form of Beauty 4, 1982)	3:56
7.	"The Slow Child" (from A New Form of Beauty 4, 1982)	3:52
8.	"Come to Daddy" (from A New Form of Beauty 4, 1982)	4:06

Side 4
No.	Title	Length
1.	"Dave-Id Performance" (from A New Form of Beauty 4, 1982)	4:17
2.	"Children Are Crying" (from A New Form of Beauty 4, 1982)	3:56
3.	"Sandpaper Lullaby" (from A New Form of Beauty 4, 1982)	3:52
4.	"Pig Children" (from A New Form of Beauty 4, 1982)	4:06

== Personnel ==
Virgin Prunes

- Dave-iD Busaras – vocals, production
- Mary D'Nellon – drums, production
- Dik Evans – guitar, production
- Gavin Friday – vocals, production
- Guggi – vocals, production
- Strongman – bass guitar, production

== Charts ==
Year	Title	UK Indie
1981	A New Form of Beauty 1	44
1982	A New Form of Beauty 2	47

== Release history ==
Region	Date	Label	Format	Catalog
Italy	1981	Italian	LP	EX 41L2
France	1993	New Rose	CD, LP	451042
United Kingdom	2004	The Grey Area	CD	YEO1CD
United States	2004	Mute	CD	MUTE 9264-2
