= ...If I Die, I Die =

Studio album by Virgin Prunes
- Released: 4 November 1982
- Recorded: July–August 1982
- Studio: Windmill Lane Studios, Dublin, Ireland
- Genre: Post-punk; gothic rock; avant-garde; avant-pop
- Length: 40:19
- Label: Rough Trade
- Producer: Colin Newman

Virgin Prunes chronology
Moments And Mine (Despite Straight Lines) (1981)	...If I Die, I Die (1982)	Hérésie (1982)

Singles from ...If I Die, I Die
- 1. "Baby Turns Blue" Released: 9 October 1982

...If I Die, I Die is the debut studio album by Irish rock band Virgin Prunes. It was released on 4 November 1982 by record label Rough Trade. It was produced by Colin Newman of Wire.

== Critical reception ==
Professional ratings
Review scores
Source	Rating
AllMusic	4.5/5 stars
Blender	4/5 stars
The Village Voice	B+

...If I Die, I Die has been well received by critics. AllMusic, in their retrospective review of the album, called it "a wonderfully confounding and sometimes campy and often disturbing exercise in unfettered creativity". Chuck Eddy of Spin included it in his list of essential gothic rock albums, remarking that it "demonstrates that sometimes 'ritualistic' equals 'catchy'." In 2026, Uncut ranked ...If I Die, I Die at number 71 in their list of "The 200 Greatest Goth Albums", describing Virgin Prunes as more harrowing than their art punk peers and writing that the album "smelts the avant-garde and avant-pop into a pummelling expression of rage and angst."

== Track listing ==
All tracks are written by Virgin Prunes.

Side one
No.	Title	Length
1.	"Ulakanakulot"	2:35
2.	"Decline and Fall"	4:50
3.	"Sweethome Under White Clouds"	4:45
4.	"Bau-Dachöng"	5:52

Side two
No.	Title	Length
1.	"Baby Turns Blue"	5:07
2.	"Ballad of the Man"	3:32
3.	"Walls of Jericho"	3:09
4.	"Caucasian Walk"	4:44
5.	"Theme for Thought"	5:45

== Personnel ==
Virgin Prunes

- Dave-iD Busaras – vocals
- Mary D'Nellon – drums
- Dik Evans – guitar
- Gavin Friday – vocals
- Guggi (Derek Rowen) – vocals
- Trevor "Strongman" Rowen – bass guitar

Technical personnel

- Colin Newman – production
- Kevin Moloney – engineering
- Steve Parker – engineering
- Denis Blackham – engineering
- BilBo – mastering
- RX – sleeve design
- Ursula Steiger – sleeve design

== Charts ==
1982 chart performance for ...If I Die, I Die
Chart (1982)	Peak position
UK Indie Chart	8

2022 chart performance for ...If I Die, I Die
Chart (2022)	Peak position
Belgian Albums (Ultratop Flanders)	132
Belgian Albums (Ultratop Wallonia)	37

== Release history ==
Region	Date	Label	Format	Catalog
United Kingdom	1982	Rough Trade	LP	ROUGH 49
France	1985	Virgin	LP	70307
United Kingdom	1990	Rough Trade	CD	ROUGH LCD 49
France	1993	New Rose	CD	452043
United Kingdom	2004	The Grey Area	CD	YEO2CD
United States	2004	Mute	CD	MUTE 9265-2
