= Aidan Walsh: Master of the Universe =

- DVD cover
- Directed by: Shimmy Marcus
- Production company: Zanzibar Films
- Release date: 2000
- Running time: 70 minutes
- Country: Ireland
- Language: English
- Budget: €70,000

Aidan Walsh: Master of the Universe is an Irish documentary film exploring the life of Aidan Walsh, directed by Shimmy Marcus. Funded partially by the Irish Film Board and filmed over four years, the documentary was released in October 2000.

== Synopsis ==
Encouraged by friends in the music industry, Aidan Walsh becomes an unlikely celebrity.

Separated into a number of chapters, the film follows the life of the "eccentric" Walsh from his early life in a school for children with learning disabilities in Cork, through a number of music-industry and videography business ventures in Dublin, to his participation in the 1997 Irish general election. The film includes commentary from Walsh's former business associates and contacts in the music industry, including musicians Simon Carmody (Golden Horde) and Gavin Friday (Virgin Prunes), radio presenters Gerry Ryan and Dave Fanning, and music journalist Richie Taylor.

== Cast ==
- Aidan Walsh
- Simon Carmody
- Dave Fanning
- Gavin Friday
- Guggi
- Gerry Ryan

== Reception ==
Aidan Walsh: Master of the Universe was screened at the Galway Film Fleadh in July 2000 and the Cork Film Festival in October 2000. In a review, published in The Irish Times in October 2000, the documentary is described as "immensely entertaining and surprisingly touching" and that it "rightly tackles attitudes to Walsh and whether we are laughing with or at him". The film received the "Best Feature Documentary" award at the Celtic Film and Television Festival in March 2001.

== Background ==
The main subject of the film, Aidan Walsh (sometimes spelled Aiden Walshe), was born in Dublin in 1954. He did not know his family, and spent his childhood in the Lota School for Boys in Cork. After briefly attempting to join the Irish Army, he was discharged in 1972 and moved to Dublin. Taking advantage of low rents in the then largely derelict Temple Bar, he briefly operated a videography company and co-founded a music recording and rehearsal studio. With friends and connections in the city's music industry (including Simon Carmody and Gavin Friday), he signed "Ireland's fastest ever record deal" in 1987. After a number of attempted business ventures, Walsh contested the 1997 Irish general election, receiving just 43 first preference votes (0.12%) in the Dublin Central constituency.
