= Twenty Tens (I've Been Smoking All Night) =

EP by Virgin Prunes
- Released: 8 January 1981
- Recorded: Setanta, Keystone, and W.M.R.S.
- Genre: Post-punk, gothic rock
- Length: 15:36
- Label: Baby
- Producer: Mayo Thompson, Paul Thomas, Virgin Prunes

Virgin Prunes chronology
Twenty Tens (1981)	"Moments and Mine (Despite Straight Lines)" (1980)

Twenty Tens (I've Been Smoking All Night) is the first EP by the Irish rock band Virgin Prunes. It was released on 8 January 1981 by Baby Records.

== Formats and track listing ==
All songs written by the Virgin Prunes.

UK 7-inch EP (baby 001)

Side one
No.	Title	Length
1.	"Twenty Tens (I've Been Smoking All Night)"	2:27
2.	"Revenge"	3:36

Side two
No.	Title	Length
1.	"The Children Are Crying"	5:12
2.	"...greylight"	4:21

== Personnel ==
Virgin Prunes

- Dave-iD Busaras – vocals
- Binttii – drums
- Dik Evans – guitar
- Gavin Friday – vocals
- Guggi – vocals
- Strongman – bass guitar

Technical personnel

- George Peckham – mastering
- Mayo Thompson – production
- Paul Thomas – production
- Virgin Prunes – production

== Charts ==
Chart (1981)	Peak position
UK Indie Chart	25
