= The Hidden Lie (Live in Paris 6/6/86) =

Live album by Virgin Prunes
- Released: May 1987
- Recorded: 6 June 1986
- Venue: Theatre Elysees Montmartre, Paris, France
- Genre: Post-punk, gothic rock
- Length: 52:00
- Label: Baby
- Producer: Mary D'Nellon, Strongman

Virgin Prunes chronology
The Moon Looked Down and Laughed (1986)	The Hidden Lie (Live in Paris 6/6/86) (1987)	Artfuck: A Compilation of Rarities (1980–1983) (1993)

Professional ratings
Review scores
Source	Rating
Allmusic	2/5 stars

The Hidden Lie (Live in Paris 6/6/86) is a live performance album by the Irish post-punk band Virgin Prunes. It was issued by Baby Records in May 1987.

== Track listing ==
All tracks are written by Virgin Prunes, except where noted

No.	Title	Writer(s)	Length
1.	"Baile Binn (Faoi Néalta Bán)"		3:15
2.	"Lady Day"	Lou Reed	3:45
3.	"God Bless the Child"	Arthur Herzog, Jr., Billie Holiday	3:24
4.	"Never Ending Story"		4:19
5.	"Pagan Lovesong"		4:05
6.	"Heaven"		3:50
7.	"Love Is Danger"		5:11
8.	"The Moon Looked Down and Laughed"		5:12
9.	"Caucasian Walk"		5:28
10.	"The Blues Song"	Jimmy Campbell, Reg Connelly	5:33
11.	"Alone"		2:36
12.	"Sweethome (Under White Clouds)"		5:22

== Personnel ==
Virgin Prunes

- Mary D'Nellon – guitar, production, mixing
- Gavin Friday – vocals
- Pod – drums
- Strongman – bass guitar, production, mixing

Technical personnel

- Shea Fitz – engineering
- Liz O'Toole – mastering

== Release history ==
Region	Date	Label	Format	Catalog
France	1987	Baby	LP	Baby 008
France	1987	Baby	CD	Baby CD008
France	1987	Baby	Cassette	Baby C008
France	1993	New Rose	CD	422473
