= Shimmy Marcus =

Irish filmmaker (born 1966)

- Born: 1966 (age 59–60); Dublin
- Occupations: Film director, Sound engineer

Shimmy Marcus is an Irish filmmaker.

== Early life ==
Marcus was born and raised in the Dublin suburb of Terenure, the son of Louis Marcus (twice Oscar nominated documentary film-maker). He was educated at Stratford College, and studied Business Management and Advertising in Dublin Institute of Technology.

After some years of traveling around the world, Marcus returned to Dublin in the early 1990s to work briefly as a recording and live sound engineer before turning to stage lighting and design. He developed stage lighting for several Irish indie bands at the time, including Engine Alley, LiR, Peach, and The Unbelievable Children.

== Career ==
He wrote his first speculative screenplay Headrush over Christmas 1994 and it was optioned shortly after by Ed Guiney of Element Films. He made his first short film in 1998, 7th Heaven, which won the "Best Short Film" award at the Irish International Film Festival in New York. In 1999, he won the Miramax Scriptwriting Award for Headrush.

In 2000 he released the feature documentary Aidan Walsh: Master of the Universe which he directed, produced, and co-edited about underground cult performer Aidan Walsh. The film went on to win awards and became the first documentary made on video to receive theatrical and video distribution in Ireland.

In 2003 he completed Headrush. Again Marcus received awards and positive reviews, but despite positive reviews in outlets such as Variety, the film failed to receive wide distribution. In 2005 he released the film himself across 10 screens in Ireland, gaining modest box office takings.

Marcus continued experiment with different work, most notably his interpretations of three chapters from James Joyce's Ulysses in the feature documentary Imagining Ulysses and his series of Limelight Shorts commissioned by the Dublin Theatre Festival to celebrate their 50th Anniversary.

Marcus also directed a documentary for RTÉ's U2 Night (25 June 2005), and a music videos for Fun Lovin' Criminals, Snow Patrol, Gavin Friday, Skin (Skunk Anansie), Republic of Loose, and BP Fallon with Jack White.

In 2009 he complete his second feature Soulboy. Set against the backdrop of the Northern Soul scene in the North of England in the mid-1970s, the film came second in the "Audience Award for Best Film" at its premiere at the Edinburgh International Film Festival. The low budget film was well received by some critics. and was released in the UK in September 2010. The Guardian called it The Comeback Kid for punching above its weight at the box office.

His second feature documentary, Good Cake, Bad Cake about the Irish band LiR and their quest to make it in the music business, also received strong reviews on its limited release.

Since then, Marcus has made two more award-winning short films, Rhinos and Hannah Cohen's Holy Communion. In 2014 he set up Bow Street Academy for Screen Acting in Smithfield, Dublin, where he is the artistic director.

== Filmography ==
- Holocaust Survivors living in Ireland (2016)
- A Disconnected Rhythm (2014)
- Hannah Cohen's Holy Communion (Short) (2012)
- Rhinos (Short) (2011)
- Good Cake Bad Cake - The Story of Lir (2013)
- Soulboy (2010)
- Breaking Boundaries (2008)
- Headrush (2003)
- Ivor the Insomniac (2001)
- Aidan Walsh: Master of the Universe (2000)
- 7th Heaven (1999)
