= Love Lasts Forever =

Love Lasts Forever may refer to:

- Love Lasts Forever (album), 2024 album by Destroy Lonely
- "Love Lasts Forever" (All Saints song)
- "Love Lasts Forever" (Kissing the Pink song)
- "Love Lasts Forever" (Virgin Prunes song)
