= Heresie =

Heresie may refer to:

- Heresie (album), an album by Univers Zero
- Heresie (EP), an EP by Virgin Prunes
