= Sons Find Devils =

Live album by Virgin Prunes
- Released: 13 January 1998
- Recorded: 1981 – 1983
- Genre: Post-punk, gothic rock
- Length: 58:20
- Label: Cleopatra

Virgin Prunes chronology
Artfuck: A Compilation of Rarities (1980–1983) (1993)	Sons Find Devils (1998)

Professional ratings
Review scores
Source	Rating
Allmusic	3/5 stars

Sons Find Devils is a live performance anthology by the Irish post-punk band Virgin Prunes. It was issued by Cleopatra Records on 13 January 1998.

== Track listing ==
All tracks are written by Virgin Prunes

No.	Title	Length
1.	"Ulakanakulot/Decline and Fall"	6:30
2.	"Pagan Lovesong"	4:07
3.	"New Form of Beauty (Part 1)"	3:27
4.	"New Form of Beauty (Part 2)"	0:29
5.	"Walls of Jericho"	2:44
6.	"Caucasian Walk"	4:36
7.	"Bernie and Attracta Sing"	2:15
8.	"Rhetoric"	7:25
9.	"Sweet Home Under White Clouds"	3:38
10.	"The Pig Children"	7:09
11.	"Come to Daddy"	6:57
12.	"Over the Rainbow"	3:40
13.	"Uncle Arthur's Lonely World"	3:17
14.	"Down the Memory Lane"	1:39

== Release history ==
Region	Date	Label	Format	Catalog
United States	1998	Cleopatra	CD	CLP 0179-2
United Kingdom	2002	Cherry Red	CD	CDM RED 218
