= Each Man Kills the Thing He Loves =

Studio album by Gavin Friday
- Released: 15 May 1989
- Genre: Cabaret, post-punk
- Length: 59:32
- Label: Island Records/Polygram
- Producer: Hal Willner

Gavin Friday chronology
Each Man Kills the Thing He Loves (1989)	Adam 'n' Eve (1992)

Professional ratings
Review scores
Source	Rating
AllMusic	4/5 stars

Each Man Kills the Thing He Loves is the debut album from Gavin Friday, following his exit from the Virgin Prunes. It was released in 1989 and is also his first collaboration with Maurice "The Man" Seezer.

The title track is an excerpt from Oscar Wilde's The Ballad of Reading Gaol set to original music. This album also features covers of Bob Dylan's "Death is not the End" and Jacques Brel's "Next" (in French : "Au Suivant").

== Track listing ==
All tracks written and arranged by Gavin Friday and Maurice Seezer; except where indicated

1. "Each Man Kills the Thing He Loves" (Lyrics by Oscar Wilde) - 5:31
2. "Tell Tale Heart" - 4:41
3. "Apologia" - 5:28
4. "Dazzle and Delight" - 6:24
5. "Next" - (Jacques Brel; English lyrics by Mort Shuman and Eric Blau) - 2:02
6. "You take Away the Sun" - 3:32
7. "Death is not the End" - (Bob Dylan) - 5:40
8. "He Got What he Wanted" - 3:25
9. "Man of Misfortune" - 4:40
10. "Rags to Riches" - 3:35
11. "The Next Thing to Murder" - 2:59
12. "Love is Just a Word" - 3:41
13. "Another Blow on the Bruise" - 3:24
14. "Each Man Kills the Thing He Loves (Reprise)" - 3:07

== Personnel ==
- Man Seezer - piano, keyboards, organ, accordion
- Bill Frisell - guitar
- Marc Ribot - guitar, banjo, the "e" flat horn [on "Death Is Not The End"]
- Hank Roberts - cello, electronics
- Fernando Saunders - bass, guitar
- Michael Blair - drums, percussion
- Howard Kaylan, Mark Volman - backing vocals on "Man of Misfortune"
