= Pagan Lovesong =

Single by Virgin Prunes
- B-side: "Dave-Id Is Dead"
- Released: June 1982
- Recorded: Berry Street Studio and Windmill Lane Studios
- Genre: Post-punk, gothic rock
- Length: 3:28
- Label: Rough Trade
- Songwriter(s): Virgin Prunes
- Producer(s): Nick Launay, Virgin Prunes

Virgin Prunes singles chronology
"Moments and Mine (Despite Straight Lines)" (1981)	"Pagan Lovesong" (1982)	"Baby Turns Blue" (1982)

"Pagan Lovesong" is a single by the Irish post-punk band Virgin Prunes, released June 1982 by Rough Trade Records.

== Formats and track listing ==
All songs written by the Virgin Prunes

UK 7" single (RT 106)

1. "Pagan Lovesong" – 3:28
2. "Dave-Id Is Dead" – 4:17

UK 12" single (12 RT 106)

1. "Pagan Lovesong (Vibeakimbo)"
2. "Pagan Lovesong"
3. "Dave-Id Is Dead"

== Personnel ==
Virgin Prunes

- Mary D'Nellon – drums
- Dik Evans – guitar
- Gavin Friday – vocals
- Guggi – vocals
- Strongman – bass guitar

Technical personnel

- Dave-id Busaras – vocals (B-side)
- Nick Launay – production, engineering
- Virgin Prunes – production
- Kevin Windmill – assistant engineering

== Charts ==
Charts (1982)	Peak position
UK Indie Chart	13
