= Maurice Seezer =

Irish songwriter/composer

Maurice Seezer (real name Maurice Roycroft, and previously known as The Man Seezer) is an Irish songwriter, musician, and film music composer. Born in 1960, he grew up in the Dublin suburb of Coolock, in a musical family.

Film scores written or co-written by Seezer include Angel Baby (1995), The Boxer (1997), Disco Pigs (2000), In America (2002), Get Rich or Die Tryin' (2005), The Pier (2011). He collaborated on three albums with Gavin Friday for Island Records from 1989 until 1995, Each Man Kills the Thing He Loves, Adam 'n' Eve and Shag Tobacco, and toured widely in Europe and North America with Friday during this period.

Since the early 90s Seezer contributed songs to soundtracks for Jim Sheridan, Baz Luhrmann and Michael Rymer: In the Name of the Father, The Boxer, In America, Romeo + Juliet, Moulin Rouge!, among others. He was a member of The Mohawks, Gavin Friday's backing band in Neil Jordan’s Breakfast on Pluto.

Collaboration and production credits also include work with Bono, Maria McKee, Andrea Corr, Camilla Griehsel, Sinéad O'Connor, Paul Tiernan, Interference (Fergus O'Farrell) and Colin Vearncombe (a.k.a. Black).

In 2003, Seezer arranged a new version of Prokofiev's "Peter and the Wolf" for small ensemble with Friday narrating in aid of the Dublin-based charity, the Irish Hospice Foundation. The enhanced CD came with a 64-page cloth-bound book illustrated by U2′s Bono, with help from his daughters Jordan and Eve.

Composition work for theatre include original scores for Corcadorca’s October 2012 production of Romeo and Juliet in Cork Opera House and the Corcadorca / Cork Opera House October 2013 joint production of Patrick McCabes play The Big Yum Yum, both directed by Pat Kiernan.

A founding committee member of the Fastnet Short Film Festival, Seezer was Chair and Artistic Director of the festival from June 2009 until September 2013.

A member of the Ibero-American Short Film Jury at Guadalajara International Film Festival (FICG) 29, Mexico, in March 2014, Seezer also contributed to Talents Guadalajara at FICG 29.

He has been nominated twice for a Golden Globe (1994, 2004), twice for an Ivor Novello Award (1995, 2004), once for a Broadcast Film Critics Association Award (2004). In 2003 he won the Phoenix Film Critics Society award for Best Original Song ("Time Enough for Tears" performed by Andrea Corr for the film In America).
