= The Moon Looked Down and Laughed =

Studio album by Virgin Prunes
- Released: July 1986
- Studio: Windmill Lane Studios, Dublin; Trident Studios, London; Rockfield Studios, Monmouth, Wales; S.T.S., Dublin
- Genre: Post-punk, gothic rock
- Length: 42:59
- Label: Baby, Touch and Go Records
- Producer: David Ball

Virgin Prunes chronology
Over the Rainbow (A Compilation of Rarities 1981–1983) (1985)	The Moon Looked Down and Laughed (1986)	The Hidden Lie (Live in Paris 6/6/86) (1987)

Professional ratings
Review scores
Source	Rating
AllMusic	2/5 stars
Uncut	5/5 stars

The Moon Looked Down and Laughed is the second and final studio album by the Irish rock band Virgin Prunes. It was released in July 1986 by Baby Records in Europe, and on Touch and Go Records in the U.S.

== Track listing ==
All tracks are written by Virgin Prunes.

No.	Title	Length
1.	"Heaven"	3:40
2.	"Love Lasts Forever"	4:45
3.	"I Am God"	3:25
4.	"Sons Find Devils"	5:01
5.	"Alone"	3:40
6.	"The Moon Looked Down and Laughed"	4:58
7.	"Uncle Arthur's Lonely World"	3:22
8.	"Don't Look Back"	3:51
9.	"Betrayal"	4:02
10.	"Deadly Sins"	6:15

1993 CD remaster bonus tracks
No.	Title	Length
11.	"Day of Ages"	3:15
12.	"True Life Story"	3:26
13.	"White History Book"	3:44

2004 CD remaster
No.	Title	Length
1.	"Heaven"	3:42
2.	"Our Love Will Last Forever Until the Day It Dies"	8:28
3.	"I Am God"	3:27
4.	"Alone"	3:47
5.	"Sons Find Devils"	4:59
6.	"Uncle Arthur's Lonely World"	3:22
7.	"True Life Story"	3:25
8.	"The Tortured Heart"	3:20
9.	"Betrayal"	4:03
10.	"Just a Lovesong"	3:01
11.	"Deadly Sins"	6:15
12.	"Day of Ages"	3:17
13.	"The Moon Looked Down and Laughed"	6:57

== Personnel ==
Virgin Prunes

- Dave-iD Busaras – vocals
- Mary D'Nellon – guitar
- Gavin Friday – vocals
- Pod – drums
- Strongman – bass guitar

Technical personnel

- Dave Ball – production
- Flood – engineering
- Dave Meegan – mixing, engineering
- Ted Sharp – engineering

== Charts ==
Charts (1986)	Peak position
UK Indie Chart	5

== Release history ==
Region	Date	Label	Format	Catalog
France	1986	Baby	LP	Baby 005
France	1986	Baby	CD	Baby CD005
France	1986	Baby	Cassette	Baby C005
United States	1986	Touch and Go	LP	T&GLP#9
United States	1986	Touch and Go	Cassette	T&G LP#9C
France	1993	New Rose	CD	422474
United Kingdom	2004	The Grey Area	CD	YEO4CD
United States	2004	Mute	CD	MUTE 9267-2
