= Adam 'n' Eve =

Studio album by Gavin Friday
- Released: 1992
- Genre: Rock, alternative
- Length: 45:00
- Label: Island Records/Polygram
- Producer: Dave Bascombe; Hal Willner; Flood

Gavin Friday chronology
Each Man Kills the Thing He Loves (1989)	Adam 'n' Eve (1992)	Shag Tobacco (1995)

Singles from Adam 'n' Eve
- 1. "I Want to Live" Released: 1992; 2. "King of Trash" Released: 1992; 3. "Falling Off the Edge of the Earth" Released: 1993

Professional ratings
Review scores
Source	Rating
Allmusic	4/5 stars

Adam 'n' Eve is the second album from Gavin Friday and again features Friday teaming up with musician Maurice "The Man" Seezer.

== Track listing ==
All tracks composed by Gavin Friday and Maurice Seezer

1. "I Want to Live" – 4:03
2. "Falling Off the Edge of the World" – 4:19
3. "King of Trash" – 2:45
4. "Why Say Goodbye" – 2:47
5. "Saint Divine" – 4:41
6. "Melancholy Baby" – 5:16
7. "Fun and Experience" – 4:05
8. "The Big No! No!" – 3:07
9. "Where in the World?" – 3:55
10. "Wind and Rain" – 5:27
11. "Eden" – 4:37

== Personnel ==
- Gavin Friday - vocals
- Maurice Seezer
- Chris Cunningham, David Tronzo; Ally McErlaine, Des O'Byrne - guitar
- Erik Sanko - bass
- Jimmy Bralower, Mikey Wilson, Ian Bryan, Paul Barrett - drums
- Michael Blair - percussion
- Sarah Homer - bass clarinet
- Maria McKee, Miriam Blennerhassett, Howard Kaylan, Mark Volman - background vocals
- Colm McCaughey - violin
- The NBC Orchestra on "Melancholy Baby"
- Ian Bryan, Jefferey Lippay, Stephen Shelton, Willie Mannion - engineers

== Other ==
- Adam 'N' Eve (CD) Island Records 1992
- Adam 'N' Eve (Cass, Album) Island Records Germany 1992
- Adam 'N' Eve (LP) Island Records, Island Records Germany 1992
- Adam 'N' Eve (LP, Album) Island Records Germany1992
- Adam 'n' Eve (CD, Album) Island Records, Island Records, Europe 1992
- Adam 'n' Eve (CD, Album) Island Records, Germany 1992
- Adam 'n' Eve (CD, Album) Island Records UK 1992
- Adam 'n' Eve (CD, Album) Island Masters 1993
