= Some Mother's Son =

- Theatrical release poster
- Directed by: Terry George
- Written by: Terry George; Jim Sheridan
- Produced by: Jim Sheridan; Arthur Lappin; Edward Burke
- Starring: Helen Mirren; Fionnula Flanagan; Aidan Gillen
- Cinematography: Geoffrey Simpson
- Edited by: Craig McKay
- Music by: Bill Whelan
- Production company: Castle Rock Entertainment
- Distributed by: Columbia Pictures (Select territories); Rank-Castle Rock/Turner (United Kingdom)
- Release date: December 25, 1996
- Running time: 112 minutes
- Countries: Ireland; United States
- Language: English
- Box office: $1.9 million (US/UK)

Some Mother's Son is a 1996 Irish-American film written and directed by Irish filmmaker Terry George, co-written by Jim Sheridan, and based on the true story of the 1981 hunger strike in the Maze Prison, in Northern Ireland. Provisional Irish Republican Army (IRA) prisoner Bobby Sands (played by John Lynch) led a protest against the treatment of IRA prisoners, claiming that they should be treated as prisoners of war rather than criminals. The mothers of two of the strikers, played by Helen Mirren and Fionnula Flanagan, fight to save their sons' lives. When the prisoners go on hunger strike and become incapacitated, the mothers must decide whether to abide by their sons' wishes, or to go against them and have them forcibly fed.

Helen Mirren and John Lynch had already acted together in the 1984 Troubles-related film Cal.

The film was screened in the Un Certain Regard section at the 1996 Cannes Film Festival.

== Cast ==
- Helen Mirren as Kathleen Quigley
- Fionnula Flanagan as Annie Higgins
- Aidan Gillen as Gerard Quigley
- David O'Hara as Frank Higgins
- John Lynch as Bobby Sands
- Tom Hollander as Farnsworth
- Tim Woodward as Harrington
- Ciarán Hinds as Danny Boyle
- Geraldine O'Rawe as Alice Quigley
- Gerard McSorley as Father Daly
- Dan Gordon as Inspector McPeake
- Grainne Delany as Theresa Higgins
- Ciarán Fitzgerald as Liam Quigley
- Robert Lang as Government Minister
- Oliver Maguire as Frank Maguire
- Stephen Hogan as Young Turk
- Anthony Brophy as Prisoner's Leader
- Myles Walsh as Man at Church door

== Reception ==
The film grossed £778,960 ($1.2 million) in the United Kingdom and Ireland and $671,437 in the United States and Canada.

== See also ==
- List of The Troubles films
