= Soulboy (film) =

- Directed by: Shimmy Marcus
- Written by: Jeff Williams
- Produced by: Christine Aldersen; Natasha Carlish; Peter Rudge
- Starring: Martin Compston; Alfie Allen; Pat Shortt; Bruce Jones
- Edited by: Andrew Hulme
- Music by: Len Arran
- Distributed by: Soda Pictures; Moviehouse Entertainment
- Release date: 19 June 2010 (Edinburgh)
- Country: United Kingdom
- Language: English

Soulboy (previously given the working title Souled Out) is a 2010 British film directed by Shimmy Marcus about 17-year-old Joe McCain (Martin Compston) coming of age in 1974 amidst the northern soul scene. The film was shot in Stoke on Trent following initial discussions with former Wigan Casino DJ Kev Roberts.

== Plot ==
The film is set in Stoke-on-Trent in 1974. Joe McCain, 17 and restless, is bored with the flatline tedium of a life that seems like it's going nowhere, spending his Saturday nights in a dead pub called The Purple Onion and trying to rob the local fish and chip shop. However he then sees a beautiful woman in the street, and acting on impulse follows her into a record shop called Dee Dees Discs, where he finds out that one of her main interests is soul music and dancing at weekends at the Wigan Casino; the home of Northern Soul. He decides to go with his friend Russ on the coach that Saturday night, and starts to devote himself to learning how to fit in with the soul scene and become a Soul Boy, but there are complications on the way...

== Cast ==
- Martin Compston as Joe McCain
- Felicity Jones as Mandy Hodgson
- Alfie Allen as Russ Mountjoy
- Nichola Burley as Jane Rogers
- Craig Parkinson as Alan
- Brian McCardie as Fish Shop Bobby
- Jo Hartley as Monica
- Pat Shortt as Brendan
- Huey Morgan as Dee Dee
- Bruce Jones as Wigan Casino bouncer
- George Oliver as Speedy Guy
- Barbara Lynn Teague as Uncredited extra
- Olivia Roberts as Uncredited extra

== Soundtrack ==
Paul Weller, Feeder, Duffy and The Dap-Kings worked on the soundtrack to the film.
