= Ciarán Fitzgerald =

Irish actor

- Born: Ciarán Fitzgerald; 27 July 1983 (age 42); Dublin, Ireland
- Other name: Ciaran Fitzgerald
- Occupation: Actor
- Years active: 1992–2006

Ciarán Fitzgerald is an Irish former film and television actor. He is best known for his role as Ossie Reilly in the 1992 film Into the West, which earned him a Young Artist Award. He has also appeared in films, such as, Nothing Personal (1995), Some Mother's Son (1996), The Last of the High Kings (1996), The Boxer (1997), and The General (1998).

== Early life and career ==
Fitzgerald was born in Dublin, Ireland. He made his film debut in 1992 when he played the role of Ossie Reilly in Into the West, a film for which he is perhaps best known. He has appeared in several Irish films including Some Mother's Son, which stars Helen Mirren; The Last of the High Kings, which stars Jared Leto, Christina Ricci, Catherine O'Hara, and Gabriel Byrne, whom Fitzgerald had worked alongside in Into the West; The Boxer, which stars Daniel Day-Lewis; and The General, which stars Brendan Gleeson, another actor which starred alongside Fitzgerald in Into the West.

Fitzgerald's television credits include Screen Two, The Hanging Gale and RTÉ One soap opera Fair City. He has appeared in two television films, The Canterville Ghost and The Informant.

=== Other work ===
Fitzgerald performed on stage at The Helix, portraying Colin Craven from The Secret Garden on 8 January 2006. He studied drama in DIT Rathmines.

== Filmography ==
Film
Year	Title	Role	Notes
1992	Into the West	Ossie Reilly	
1995	Nothing Personal	Young Liam Kelly	
1996	Some Mother's Son	Liam Quigley	
1996	The Last of the High Kings	Noelie Griffin	
1996	Space Truckers	(Non-acting work)	Camera trainee: second unit
1997	The Boxer	Liam	
1997	Seeing Things	Jack Park	Short film
1998	The General	Tommy	

Television
Year	Title	Role	Notes
1992	The Big Breakfast	Himself	Episode dated 11 December 1992
1994	Screen Two	Barry O'Neill	Episode: "All Things Bright and Beautiful"
1995	The Hanging Gale	Joseph Phelan	Miniseries (4 episodes)
1996	The Canterville Ghost	Adam Otis	ABC TV film
1997	The Informant	Gerard McAnally	Showtime TV film
2005	Fair City	Finn McDonald	(1 episode)

== Stage ==
- The Secret Garden, as Colin Craven – The Helix, Dublin, Landmark Productions (6 December 2005 – 8 January 2006).

== Awards and nominations ==
Won: Young Artist Award for Outstanding Youth Actors in a Family Foreign Film – shared with Rúaidhrí Conroy (15th Youth in Film Awards, 1994).
