= Love Lasts Forever (Virgin Prunes song) =

Single by Virgin Prunes

from the album The Moon Looked Down and Laughed
- B-side: "True Life Story"
- Released: June 1986
- Recorded: Windmill Lane Studios, Dublin, Ireland. Trident, London, England. Rockfield, Manmouth, Wales. S.T.S., Dublin, Ireland.
- Genre: Post-punk, gothic rock
- Length: 4:45
- Label: Baby, Touch and Go
- Songwriter: Virgin Prunes
- Producer: Dave Ball

Virgin Prunes singles chronology
"Baby Turns Blue" (1982)	"Love Lasts Forever" (1986)

"Love Lasts Forever" is a single by the Irish post-punk band Virgin Prunes, released in June 1986 on Baby Records in Europe, and on Touch and Go in the U.S.

== Formats and track listing ==
All songs written by the Virgin Prunes

UK 7" single (Baby 003)

1. "Love Lasts Forever" – 4:45
2. "True Life Story" – 3:25

UK 12" single (Baby 004)
US 12" single (T&G #15)

1. "Lovelornalimbo" – 7:47
2. "I Like the Way You’re Frightened" – 8:25

== Personnel ==
Virgin Prunes

- Mary D'Nellon – guitar
- Gavin Friday – vocals
- Pod – drums
- Strongman – bass guitar

Technical personnel

- Dave Ball – production

== Charts ==
Charts (1986)	Peak position
UK Indie Chart	18
