= The Boxer (1997 film) =

- Theatrical release poster
- Directed by: Jim Sheridan
- Written by: Terry George; Jim Sheridan
- Produced by: Arthur Lappin; Jim Sheridan
- Starring: Daniel Day-Lewis; Emily Watson; Brian Cox; Ken Stott; Gerard McSorley; Kenneth Cranham
- Cinematography: Chris Menges
- Edited by: Gerry Hambling
- Music by: Gavin Friday; Maurice Seezer
- Production company: Hell's Kitchen Films
- Distributed by: Universal Pictures (through United International Pictures)
- Release dates: 31 December 1997 (United States); 6 February 1998 (Ireland)
- Running time: 114 minutes
- Country: Ireland
- Language: English
- Budget: $4.7 million
- Box office: $16.5 million

The Boxer is a 1997 Irish sports drama film directed by Jim Sheridan and written by Sheridan and Terry George. Starring Daniel Day-Lewis, Emily Watson, and Brian Cox, the film centres on the life of a boxer and former Provisional IRA volunteer Danny Flynn, played by Day-Lewis, who is trying to "go straight" after his release from prison. The film is the third collaboration between Sheridan and Day-Lewis and portrays different factions within the IRA. In preparation for the role, Daniel Day-Lewis trained as a boxer in Ireland for a year.

== Plot summary ==
Irish boxer and former Provisional IRA member Danny Flynn returns home to Belfast after a 14-year stint in prison at the age of 32. Disillusioned by the unbroken cycle of violence in Northern Ireland, he attempts to settle down and live a normal life. After meeting his alcoholic old trainer Ike, Danny starts a non-sectarian boxing club for boys in an old gymnasium.

While fixing up the old building, however, Danny finds a cache of explosives (Semtex) hidden underneath the stage. He throws the cache into the river.

Danny's action infuriates Harry, a cold-hearted, staunch IRA lieutenant. Danny reconnects with an old flame, Maggie, now married to an imprisoned IRA man and required by the IRA code to remain faithful to him.

Harry sees Danny and Maggie's relationship as a way to undermine the authority of her father, Joe Hamill, the gruff but pacifist local IRA commander campaigning for peace. Harry's harassment of Danny includes the assassination of the friendly police officer who donates equipment to the boxing club. The murder causes a riot at one of Danny's boxing matches. During the riot, the gymnasium is burnt down by Liam, the young son of Maggie, who thinks Danny and his mother are going to elope.

During another boxing match against a Nigerian boxer, Danny throws in his own towel, believing the other boxer cannot go on further. After seeing this on a TV broadcast, Ike and Harry get into an altercation leading to Harry killing Ike.

Later still, Harry and other IRA men kidnap Danny and take him away to be executed. In a last-minute twist, the IRA gunmen shoot Harry instead of Danny, thus eliminating a rogue agent. With her son Liam in the car, Maggie picks up Danny and they all drive away to start a life together.

== Cast ==
- Daniel Day-Lewis as Danny Flynn
- Emily Watson as Maggie
- Brian Cox as Joe Hamill
- Ken Stott as Ike Weir
- Gerard McSorley as Harry
- Maria McDermottroe as Betty
- Ian McElhinney as Reggie Bell
- Ciarán Fitzgerald as Liam

== Release ==
The film opened in three theaters in the United States on 31 December 1997. It opened in Ireland on 6 February 1998. Reviews of the film were generally positive; the review aggregating website Rotten Tomatoes reported that 81% of the 72 reviews tallied were positive with the consensus: "The Boxer is a standard drama that packs a true emotional wallop thanks to the highly tuned central performances." Metacritic, which uses a weighted average, assigned the film a score of 75 out of 100, based on 19 critics, indicating "generally favorable" reviews.

The film grossed US$5,896,037 in the United States and Canada. In the UK and Ireland, the film grossed £1.3 million ($2.2 million). Elsewhere, the film grossed $8 million, for a worldwide total of $16 million.

The Boxer was nominated for three Golden Globe Awards in the Picture, Actor (Daniel Day-Lewis) and Director (Jim Sheridan) categories. It also competed for the Golden Bear at 48th Berlin International Film Festival in 1998. It won the Goya Award for Best European Film.

== Reception ==
On review aggregator website Rotten Tomatoes, the film holds an approval rating of 80% based on 71 reviews, with an average rating of 7.3/10.

== See also ==
- List of The Troubles films
- List of boxing films
