= Heresie (EP) =

Hérésie

EP by Virgin Prunes
- Released: November 1982
- Recorded: June 1982 at Windmill Lane Studios, Dublin, Ireland; April 1982 at the Rex Club, Paris, France
- Genre: Post-punk, gothic rock
- Length: 52:40
- Label: L'Invitation Au Suicide
- Producer: Virgin Prunes

Virgin Prunes chronology
...If I Die, I Die (1982)	Hérésie (1982)	A New Form of Beauty Parts 1–4) (1983)

Professional ratings
Review scores
Source	Rating
AllMusic	3.5/5 stars

Hérésie is a double 10" extended play box set by the Irish post-punk band Virgin Prunes. It was released in November 1982 by L'Invitation Au Suicide, which had commissioned the band to create a work dealing with the concept of insanity. It was released simultaneously with the band's debut studio album, ...If I Die, I Die.

The Hérésie package also contained five booklets. The first 10-inch disc, consisting of seven songs, functioned as a soundtrack to the booklets. The second disc was a live recording of Virgin Prunes at the Rex Club in Paris in June 1982.

== Track listing ==
All tracks are written by Virgin Prunes.

Side one
No.	Title	Length
1.	"We Love Deirdre"	1:20
2.	"Rhetoric"	7:16

Side two
No.	Title	Length
1.	"Down the Memory Lane"	3:27
2.	"Man on the Corner"	2:21
3.	"Nisam Lo"	1:28
4.	"Loved One"	4:38
5.	"Go't' Away Deirdre"	0:59

Side three
No.	Title	Length
1.	"Live at the Rex Club, Paris" (Caucasian Walk/Walls of Jericho/Pagan Lovesong)	13:19

Side four
No.	Title	Length
1.	"Live at the Rex Club, Paris" (Theme for Thought/Come to Daddy)	17:52

== Personnel ==
Virgin Prunes

- Dave-id Busaras – vocals
- Mary D'Nellon – drums
- Dik Evans – guitar
- Gavin Friday – vocals
- Guggi – vocals
- Strongman – bass guitar

Technical personnel

- James Connolly – assistant engineering (A1-B5)
- Padraig Pearse – engineering (A1-B5)
- Virgin Prunes – production

== Release history ==
Region	Date	Label	Format	Catalog
France	1982	L'Invitation Au Suicide	LP	INV. 0500
France	1988	Baby	LP	BABY 011
France	1993	New Rose	CD	422475
United Kingdom	2004	The Grey Area	CD	YEO3CD
United States	2004	Mute	CD	MUTE 9266-2
