= Shag Tobacco =

Studio album by Gavin Friday
- Released: 1995
- Studio: Eastcote (London); Westside (London)
- Genre: Rock; alternative rock
- Length: 55:18
- Label: Island; PolyGram
- Producer: Tim Simenon

Gavin Friday chronology
Adam 'n' Eve (1992)	Shag Tobacco (1995)	Catholic (2011)

Professional ratings
Review scores
Source	Rating
AllMusic	4/5 stars

Shag Tobacco is the third solo album from Gavin Friday. Once again, Friday teamed up with musician Maurice "The Man" Seezer. Bono and The Edge contribute backing vocals on "Little Black Dress". "The Last Song I'll Ever Sing" was dedicated "in loving memory" of Scottish-Irish street performer Thom McGinty.

This album features a cover of T. Rex's "The Slider".

The second track, "Caruso", is Friday's tribute to Enrico Caruso, the Italian opera singer.

The third track, "Angel", was featured on the soundtrack of the 1996 film William Shakespeare's Romeo + Juliet.

Patrick McCabe wrote the album's liner notes.

== Track listing ==
1. "Shag Tobacco" – 4:33
2. "Caruso" – 5:41
3. "Angel" – 6:03
4. "Little Black Dress" – 4:29
5. "The Slider" (Marc Bolan) – 3:16
6. "Dolls" – 4:10
7. "Mr Pussy" – 3:40
8. "You Me and World War Three" – 4:39
9. "Kitchen Sink Drama" – 5:57
10. "My Twentieth Century" – 5:08
11. "The Last Song I'll Ever Sing" – 3:48
12. "Le Roi d'Amour" – 3:53

== Personnel ==
- Gavin Friday – vocals, megaphone (Friday called a "stronzophone") on "Caruso", "The Slider" and "Dolls"
- Maurice Seezer – bass, keyboards, accordion, drum programming
- Chris Cunningham – guitar, mandolin
- Erik Sanko – bass
- Renaud Pion – synthesizer, bass clarinet, baritone saxophone, flute, Jew's harp
- Dave Clayton – keyboards
- Danny Cummings – percussion
- Loretta Heyward – background vocals
- Bono, The Edge – background vocals on "Little Black Dress"
- Tim Simenon – turntables, drum programming
- Don Hozz – synthesizer on "Angel"
