= Into the West (film) =

1992 film by Mike Newell

- Theatrical release poster
- Directed by: Mike Newell
- Written by: Jim Sheridan; David Keating
- Produced by: Jonathan Cavendish; Tim Palmer; Gabriel Byrne (associate)
- Starring: Gabriel Byrne; Ellen Barkin; Rúaidhrí Conroy; Ciarán Fitzgerald
- Cinematography: Newton Thomas Sigel
- Edited by: Peter Boyle
- Music by: Patrick Doyle
- Production companies: Channel Four Films; Miramax; Majestic Films International; Parallel Film Productions
- Distributed by: Entertainment Film Distributors
- Release dates: 11 December 1992 (Ireland); 17 September 1993 (USA)
- Running time: 102 minutes
- Country: Ireland
- Language: English
- Budget: US$6 million
- Box office: £0.7 million (Ireland)

Into the West is a 1992 Irish magical realist film about Irish Travellers written by Jim Sheridan and David Keating, directed by Mike Newell, and stars Gabriel Byrne and Ellen Barkin.

== Plot ==
Into the West is a film about two young boys, Tito (Conroy) and Ossie (Fitzgerald), whose father "Papa" Reilly (Byrne) was "King of Irish Travellers" until his wife, Mary, died during Ossie's birth. The boys' grandfather (David Kelly) is an old story-telling Traveller, who regales the children with Irish folk-tales and legends. When he is followed by a beautiful white horse called Tír na nÓg (meaning "Land of Eternal Youth" in Irish), from the sea to Dublin, where the boys and their father have now settled down in a grim tower block in Ballymun, the boys are overwhelmed with joy and dreams of becoming cowboys. The horse is stolen from them by corrupt Gardai and is sold as a showjumper. They see Tír na nÓg on TV, and they begin their adventure to get their mystical horse back. They escape the poverty of a north Dublin council estate, and ride "Into the West". Papa Reilly is arrested, and beaten by the corrupt Gardaí, until he is released on the orders of the superintendent. He then returns to his halting site, where he is shown no welcome. His friend Kathleen takes him in and from there they go to track the boys. Meanwhile, the boys find shelter using traditional traveller methods and move further west as "cowboys". As they travel, they find the Gardai, helicopters and dog packs tracking them. Tír na nÓg always seems to find a way to avoid them. The horse takes them to their mother's grave, where Ossie finds out his mother died giving birth to him. The net closes in on the boys, forcing them to flee to the beach, where they find Papa Reilly, Kathleen and the Barrel maker. The Gardai catch Papa Reilly and the Barrel maker in nets, and Tír na nÓg gallops into the sea, with Ossie still on his back. Papa Reilly breaks free and goes into the sea, where he brings out a lifeless Ossie. After receiving CPR, Ossie comes round. The superintendent calls off the hunt for the boys. After that, Papa Reilly finally burns his Barrel Wagon, and puts his Wife's memory to rest. The boys see Tír na nÓg's image in the flames, and smile.

== Cast ==
- Gabriel Byrne as Papa Reilly
- Ellen Barkin as Kathleen
- Ciarán Fitzgerald as Ossie
- Rúaidhrí Conroy as Tito (credited as Ruaidhrí Conroy)
- David Kelly as Grandfather
- Johnny Murphy as Tracker
- Colm Meaney as Barreller
- John Kavanagh as Hartnett
- Brendan Gleeson as Inspector Bolger
- Jim Norton as Superintendent O'Mara
- Anita Reeves as Mrs. Murphy
- Ray McBride as Mr. Murphy
- Dave Duffy as Morrissey
- Stuart Dannell-Foran as Conor Murphy (credited as Stuart Dannell)
- Becca Hollinshead as Birdy Murphy

== Production ==
Into the West was co-financed by U.S. independent film company Miramax and film-sales outlet Majestic Films International. The script was written by Jim Sheridan, who did not intend to write simply for children, although the film mainly follows two young children on the run with their beautiful, magical white horse. Other themes targeted to adults, are also present: grief, the clash of cultures with differing values, and the use of the police by the rich and powerful to enforce property rights in their favour. Sheridan wrote the script five years before he directed My Left Foot.

Gabriel Byrne said it was one of the best scripts he ever read, and described it at the time as Jim Sheridan's best work to date. Byrne was committed to the work, and commented: Apart from it being a story about Travellers, and the relationship between a father and his two sons, it really was in a way about Ireland. Ellen Barkin said that from the first reading she thought it an extraordinary piece of film writing.

The film's most memorable scenes, such as the horse in the cinema and the beans exploding, were shot in the small town of Portarlington in County Laois.

== Release ==
In the U.S., Into the West was the first release from the Miramax Family Films label.

== Reception ==
The film has received a mostly positive critical reception. On Rotten Tomatoes, the film has a score of 77% based on reviews from 13 critics.

Roger Ebert of the Chicago Sun-Times said the "kids will probably love this movie, but adults will get a lot more out of it". Variety Staff said that "Into the West is a likable but modest pic", and that "a major asset throughout is Patrick Doyle's rich, Gaelic-flavoured scoring that carries the movie's emotional line and fairy tale atmosphere". Desson Howe of The Washington Post said that the film is "a charming children's crusade – a rewarding journey for all ages". Rita Kempley of The Washington Post said that "the movie is alternately grim and lyrical", and "though long on ambiance and short on story, it may appeal to the spiritually inclined – and to oater lovers".

=== Box office ===
Into the West was the fourth highest-grossing film in Ireland for the year with a gross of £748,080.

=== Awards ===
- 1993: Roxanne T. Mueller Audience Choice Award for Best Film at the Cleveland International Film Festival – Mike Newell.
- 1993: Starboy Award at the Oulu International Children's Film Festival – Mike Newell.
- 1994: Golden Calf for Best European Film at the Netherlands Film Festival – Mike Newell.
- 1994: Young Artist Award for Outstanding Family Foreign Film at the Young Artist Awards – Mike Newell.
- 1994: Young Artist Award for Outstanding Youth Actor in a Family Film at the Young Artist Awards – Rúaidhrí Conroy & Ciarán Fitzgerald.

== Home video releases ==
Into the West was released on VHS and LaserDisc format in the US by Touchstone Home Video in 1994. The DVD was released in the US on 4 February 2003 by Miramax Home Entertainment with an aspect ratio of 1.85:1 anamorphic widescreen.

The VHS was released in Ireland and the UK on 21 September 1993 by Entertainment in Video. It was released on DVD in Ireland and the UK on 17 December 2001 by Entertainment in Video and again on 15 September 2003 by Cinema Club. As of 2020, it is being broadcast on the Criterion Channel in the US and Canada.

== See also ==
- List of films about horses

== Bibliography ==
- Lance Pettitt, Screening Ireland: film and television representation, Manchester University Press, 2000, 320 p. (ISBN 9780719052705)
- Joe Cleary, Outrageous Fortune: Capital and Culture in Modern Ireland, vol. 1, Field Day Publications, coll. « Field day files », 2007, 320 p. (ISBN 9780946755356)
