= Moments and Mine/In the Greylight/War =

"Moments and Mine (Despite Straight Lines)"

Single by Virgin Prunes
- Released: 27 June 1981
- Recorded: Berry Street Studio and Windmill Lane Studios
- Genre: Post-punk, gothic rock
- Length: 4:27
- Label: Rough Trade
- Songwriter(s): Virgin Prunes
- Producer(s): Geoff Travis, Virgin Prunes

Virgin Prunes singles chronology
"Twenty Tens" (1981)	"Moments and Mine (Despite Straight Lines)" (1981)	"Pagan Lovesong" (1982)

"Moments and Mine (Despite Straight Lines)" is a single by the Irish post-punk band Virgin Prunes, released as a vinyl 7" on 27 June 1981 by Rough Trade Records.

== Formats and track listing ==
All songs written by the Virgin Prunes

UK 7" single (RT 072)

1. "Moments and Mine (Despite Straight Lines)" – 4:27
2. "In the Greylight" – 2:50
3. "War" – 2:06

== Personnel ==
Drums Haa-Lacka Binttii (Daniel Figgis) Boy on the cover is Binttii's (Daniel Figgis) younger brother, Jonny Figgis

Virgin Prunes

- Binttii – drums
- Dik Evans – guitar
- Gavin Friday – vocals
- Guggi – vocals
- Strongman – bass guitar

Technical personnel

- Adam Kidron – engineering
- George Peckham – mastering
- Geoff Travis – production
- Virgin Prunes – production

== Charts ==
Chart (1981)	Peak position
UK Indie Chart	50
