= Catholic (album) =

Studio album by Gavin Friday
- Released: 2011
- Genre: Rock / Alternative
- Length: 51:06
- Label: Rubyworks
- Producer: Ken Thomas

Gavin Friday chronology
Shag Tobacco (1995)	Catholic (2011)	Ecce Homo (2024)

Professional ratings
Review scores
Source	Rating
Hot Press	4/5 stars
Q	4/5 stars
Mojo	4/5 stars
Uncut	4/5 stars

Catholic is the fourth solo album from Gavin Friday, written and recorded with musician Herbie Macken and released in 2011. It was released in Ireland on Good Friday (22 April), 16 years after the release of his previous album, Shag Tobacco. catholic deals with concepts of letting go and coming to terms with loss. It was produced by Ken Thomas (Throbbing Gristle, Cocteau Twins, Sigur Rós) and recorded in Dublin, Cork and West Yorkshire. Patrick McCabe wrote the novella Requiem for the Dying for the album liner notes. The video for "Able" was directed by Kevin Godley.

== Track listing ==
1. "Able" – 4:47
2. "Land on the Moon" – 5:07
3. "A Song that Hurts" – 5:33
4. "The Only One" – 4:16
5. "Blame" – 4:54
6. "The Sun and the Moon and the Stars" – 4:17
7. "It's All Ahead of You" – 4:34
8. "Perfume" – 3:34
9. "Epilogue" – 3:09
10. "Where'd Ya Go? Gone" – 4:41
11. "Lord I'm Comin'" – 6:52

== Personnel ==
- Gavin Friday – vocals, backing vocals
- Herbie Macken – keyboards, piano, guitars, backing vocals, piano, programming
- Kate Ellis – cello
- Andre Antunes – drums, percussion
- Gareth Hughes – bass guitars
- Anthony Drennan – electric guitar
- Jolyon Vaughan Thomas – programming, electric guitars, bass, keyboards
- Matthew Allsop – euphonium
- Moya Brennan – backing vocals
- Amy Odell – vocals, backing vocals
- John Kelly – harmonica

== Album title ==
The album's title is deliberately spelled with a lower case c to emphasise the word's original meaning: universal, for every man, with wide sympathies. Friday stated he wanted to claim back the word from the Roman Catholic church.

== Album cover ==
The album's cover photo is based on and pays homage to the painting Michael Collins, Love of Ireland by Sir John Lavery which depicts Irish revolutionary leader Michael Collins lying in state. Friday had seen the painting at the Sir John Lavery "Passion and Politics" exhibit in Dublin at the Hugh Lane Gallery in September 2010. The photo was taken by Perry Ogden. Although the image sets up parallels between the turmoil of the birth years of an independent Ireland and the mid-2000s state of upheaval and political chaos, Friday has stated that this is "an emotional, not a political, album".
