= Jim Sheridan =

Irish filmmaker (born 1949)

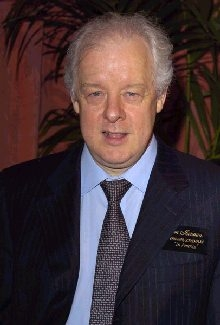
- Born: 6 February 1949 (age 77); Dublin, Ireland
- Other name: Shay
- Occupations: Film director; screenwriter; film producer
- Years active: 1979–present
- Known for: My Left Foot (1989); In the Name of the Father (1993); The Boxer (1997); In America (2002)

Jim Sheridan (born 6 February 1949) is an Irish filmmaker. Between 1989 and 1993, Sheridan directed three critically acclaimed films set in Ireland, My Left Foot (1989), The Field (1990), and In the Name of the Father (1993), and later directed the films The Boxer (1997), In America (2003), and Brothers (2009). Sheridan has received six Academy Award nominations for his work.

== Life and career ==
Jim Sheridan was born in Dublin on 6 February 1949. He is the brother of playwright Peter Sheridan. The family ran a lodging house, while Anna Sheridan worked at a hotel and Peter Sheridan Snr was a railway clerk with CIÉ. Sheridan's early education was at a Christian Brothers school. In 1969 he attended University College Dublin to study English and History. In 1972, he graduated with a Bachelor of Arts degree in English. He became involved in student theatre there, where he met Neil Jordan, who also was later to become an important Irish film director. After graduating from UCD in 1972, Sheridan and his brother began writing and staging plays, and in the late 1970s began working with the Project Theatre Company.

In 1981, Sheridan emigrated to Canada, but eventually settled in the Hell's Kitchen section of New York City in the United States. He enrolled in the New York University Tisch School of the Arts and became the artistic director of the Irish Arts Center.

Sheridan returned to Ireland in the late 1980s. In 1989, he directed My Left Foot (with Daniel Day-Lewis and Brenda Fricker), which became a critical and commercial success and won Day-Lewis and Fricker Academy Awards. He followed that with The Field (with Richard Harris) in 1990; then with In the Name of the Father in 1993, a fictionalised re-telling of the case of the Guildford Four. The film won the Golden Bear at the 44th Berlin International Film Festival.

In 1996 he co-wrote Some Mother's Son with Terry George. The Boxer was nominated for a Golden Globe for best film drama in 1997. The film was Sheridan's third collaboration with Day-Lewis after My Left Foot and In the Name of the Father, making him the only director to work with Day-Lewis on three films. In 2003, he released the semi-autobiographical In America, which tells the story of a family of Irish immigrants trying to succeed in New York. The film received positive reviews and earned Samantha Morton and Djimon Hounsou Academy Award nominations. In 2005 he released Get Rich or Die Tryin', a film starring rap star 50 Cent.

Sheridan directed the 2009 film Brothers, starring Tobey Maguire, Jake Gyllenhaal, and Natalie Portman, which was shot in New Mexico. He also directed the thriller Dream House, which starred Daniel Craig, Naomi Watts, and Rachel Weisz.

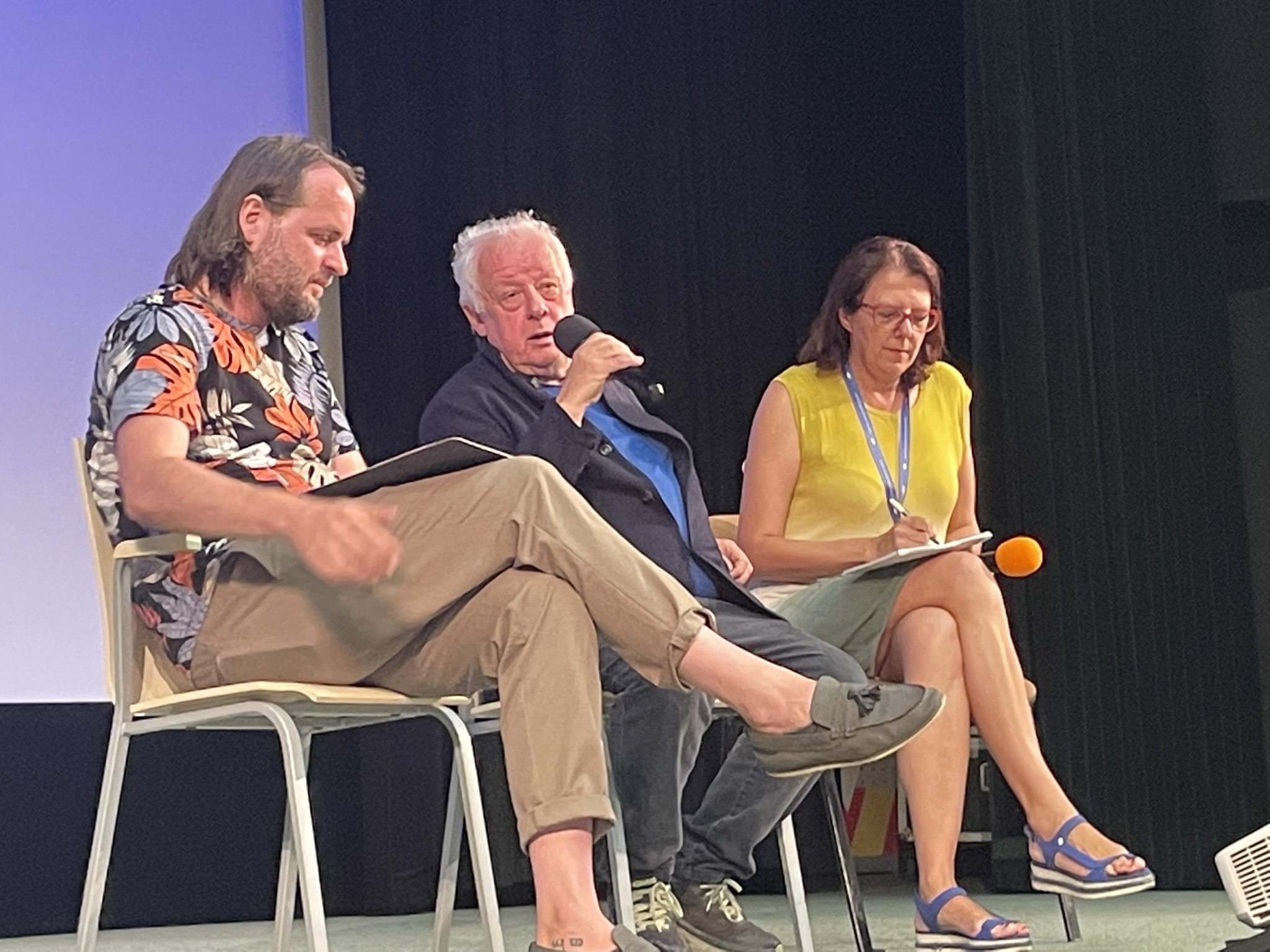
Discussion with Jim Sheridan at Summer Film School (CR) in 2022

== Filmography ==
=== Films ===
Year	Title	Director	Writer	Producer	Notes
1989	My Left Foot	Yes	Yes	No	
1990	The Field	Yes	Yes	No	
1992	Into the West	No	Yes	No	
1993	In the Name of the Father	Yes	Yes	Yes	
1996	Some Mother's Son	No	Yes	Yes	
1997	The Boxer	Yes	Yes	Yes	
1999	Agnes Browne	No	No	Yes	
2002	In America	Yes	Yes	Yes	
2005	Get Rich or Die Tryin'	Yes	No	Yes	
2009	Brothers	Yes	No	No	
2011	Dream House	Yes	No	No	
2016	The Secret Scripture	Yes	Yes	Yes	
2017	11th Hour	Yes	Yes	No	Short film
2025	Re-creation	Yes	Yes	No	

Executive producer

- Borstal Boy (2000)
- On the Edge (2001)
- Bloody Sunday (2002)
- Where's Daddy! (2006) (Short film)
- Dollhouse (2012)
- Omar Sharif's Tribute (2015) (Documentary)
- Shelter Me: Apollo House (2018) (Documentary)
- First Disco (2019) (Short film)

Acting credits

Title	Year	Role	Notes
Words Upon the Window Pane	1994	Jonathan Swift / Dean Swift	
The General	1998	CPAD Leader	
The Bridge of San Luis Rey	2004	The King of Spain	
The Carpenter and His Clumsy Wife	2004	Narrator (voice)	Short film
What If	2006	Himself	Short film
Hannah Cohen's Holy Communion	2012	Father O'Brien	Short film
The Family Way	2017	Eugene	Short film
Re-creation	2025	Juror 1	

=== Television series ===
Title	Year	Credited as	Notes
Thursday Play Date	1979	Writer and actor	Episode "Mobile Homes"
Inside Apollo House	2017	Executive producer	Documentary
Murder at the Cottage: The Search for Justice for Sophie	2021	Director and executive producer	Documentary
Peter O'Toole: Along the Sky Road to Aqaba	2022	Director	Documentary

=== Music video ===
- "You Made Me the Thief of Your Heart" by Sinéad O'Connor (1994)

== Awards and nominations ==
Academy Awards

- Best Adapted Screenplay – My Left Foot (1990), nomination (as co-writer)
- Best Director – My Left Foot (1990), nomination (as director)
- Best Adapted Screenplay – In the Name of the Father (1994), nomination (as co-writer)
- Best Director – In the Name of the Father (1994), nomination (as director)
- Best Picture – In the Name of the Father (1994), nomination (as producer)
- Best Original Screenplay – In America (2004), nomination (as co-writer)

Berlin International Film Festival

- 1994, Golden Bear – In the Name of the Father, winner
- 1998, Golden Bear – The Boxer, nomination

British Academy Film Awards

- Best Adapted Screenplay – My Left Foot (1990), nomination (as co-writer)
- Best Adapted Screenplay – In the Name of the Father (1993), nomination (as co-writer)

European Film Awards

- European Director of the Year – My Left Foot (1989), nomination

Golden Globe Awards

- Best Director – The Boxer (1997), nomination
- Best Screenplay – In America (2002), nomination (as co-writer)

Gregory Peck Award

- Lifetime Achievement – Dingle International Film Festival (2009)

Independent Spirit Awards

- Best Director – In America (2002), nomination

National Board of Review

- Best Original Screenplay – In America (2002), winner (as co-writer)

Writers Guild of America

- Best Original Screenplay – In America (2002), nomination (as co-writer)

Awards and nominations received by Sheridan's features

Year	Title	Academy Awards		BAFTA Awards		Golden Golden Awards	
Year	Title	Nominations	Wins	Nominations	Wins	Nominations	Wins
1989	My Left Foot	5	2	5	2	2	
1990	The Field	1		1		1	
1993	In the Name of the Father	7		2		4	
1997	The Boxer					3	
2002	In America	3				2	
2009	Brothers					2	
Total		16	2	8	2	14	

=== Directed Academy Award Performances ===
Under Sheridan's direction, these actors have received Academy Award nominations and wins for their performances in these respective roles.

Year	Performer	Film	Result
Academy Award for Best Actor
1990	Daniel Day-Lewis	My Left Foot	Won
1991	Richard Harris	The Field	Nominated
1994	Daniel Day-Lewis	In the Name of the Father	Nominated
Academy Award for Best Supporting Actor
1994	Pete Postlethwaite	In the Name of the Father	Nominated
2004	Djimon Hounsou	In America	Nominated
Academy Award for Best Actress
2004	Samantha Morton	In America	Nominated
Academy Award for Best Supporting Actress
1990	Brenda Fricker	My Left Foot	Won
1994	Emma Thompson	In the Name of the Father	Nominated

== See also ==
- List of Irish film directors
- List of Academy Award winners and nominees from Ireland
