= BP Fallon =

Irish DJ (born 1946)

- Born: 24 August 1946 (age 80); Dublin, Ireland
- Origin: Dublin, Ireland
- Genres: Pop, rock, spoken word, electronic
- Occupations: DJ, Author, Actor, Photographer, Musician
- Instrument: Vocals
- Label: Vibrosonic Records
- Website: www.bpfallon.com

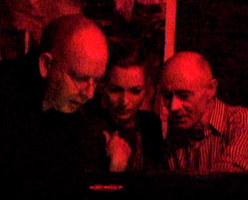
Alan McGee, Kate Moss, and BP Fallon DJing at Death Disco NY in 2004

Bernard Patrick Fallon (born 24 August 1946), also known as BP Fallon, is an Irish DJ, author, actor, photographer and musician. He lives in Rathfarnham, Dublin.

== Life ==
At a young age, BP Fallon became a personality and broadcaster in Ireland, later moving on to music journalism and photography.

In the late 1960s, Fallon moved to London to pursue his journalism career. In March 1969, he scored a coup - an interview with John Lennon at the 'bed-in' in Amsterdam - which was published in the Melody Maker. This led to a further Lennon interview and a job at Apple Records working with publicist Derek Taylor. In 1970, he appeared on Top of the Pops miming the tambourine in John Lennon's performance of "Instant Karma!". In an alternate clip, Fallon was shown miming the bass guitar.

Fallon then became publicist for Thin Lizzy and T. Rex - for whom he coined the term "T.Rextasy". He worked and toured with Led Zeppelin during the band's heyday in the 1970s. During the punk rock years he represented Ian Dury.

Fallon returned to Irish radio in the 1980s, and in 1986 won a Jacob's Award for his RTÉ 2fm show, The BP Fallon Orchestra.

In the early 1990s, Fallon toured with and DJ'd for U2 on their Zoo TV Tour and wrote a book/journal about his experiences called U2 Faraway So Close. He then started up a multinational club "Death Disco" with Alan McGee, which was variously located in Dublin, London, New York, and sundry other locations. Later in the 2000s, he DJ'd on the road with the groups My Bloody Valentine and The Kills.

In December 2009, he released a solo record "Fame#9" - a collaboration with Jack White on his label Third Man Records. The 7" single is notable for being "3-sided" - the b-side has separate tracks recorded on the left and right stereo channels.

Fallon performed on stage with varying lineups before forming BP Fallon & The Bandits with Aaron Lee Tasjan (guitar), plus Nigel Harrison (bass) and Clem Burke (drums) both from Blondie. In 2013 the band released their debut album Still Legal on their own Vibrosonic Records. The album included additional playing by Ian McLagan of the Small Faces. In March 2014 he appeared at SXSW with the group Ghost Wolves, as well as The Strypes performing the song Vicious at a Lou Reed memorial concert produced by Richard Barone and Alejandro Escovedo.

In August 2016, a second album 'Hot Tongue' was released. Fallon performed the title song on Irish television, backed by Emma Lou and the Agenda.
