= Virgin Prunes =

Irish rock band (1977–1986)

- Origin: Dublin, Ireland
- Genres: Post-punk, gothic rock
- Years active: 1977–1986
- Labels: Baby; Rough Trade; L'Invitation Au Suicide; Touch and Go; Mute
- Past members: Gavin Friday; Guggi; Dik Evans; Dave-iD Busaras; Strongman; Mary D'Nellon; Pod; Haa-Lacka Binttii

Virgin Prunes were an Irish post-punk/gothic rock band formed in 1977 in Dublin. They disbanded in 1986 after the departure of singer Gavin Friday. The other members continued under the name The Prunes until they split up in 1991.

== History ==
The Virgin Prunes were founded in 1977 by vocalists Guggi (né Derek Rowen), Gavin Friday (né Fionan Hanvey) and Dave-iD Busaras, guitarist Dik Evans (brother of U2's The Edge), bassist Strongman (Trevor Rowen, brother of Guggi) and drummer Pod (Anthony Murphy).

Two of the band members, Guggi and Friday, had been part of Lypton Village, a "youthful gang" in early 1970s Dublin, which had also included U2's Bono.

Known for their outrageous and controversial stage performances, led by theatrical singer/songwriter Friday, the band began playing small shows in Dublin, gaining them a cult audience. Pod left the group and was replaced by Haa-Lacka Binttii (né Daniel Figgis). With Binttii on drums, tape loops and keyboards, the band secured a deal with Rough Trade Records. They released their first single, "Twenty Tens" on their own Baby Records label (distributed by Rough Trade) on 8 January 1981, followed by a second single, "Moments and Mine (Despite Straight Lines)", on 27 June 1981.

Two other tracks recorded with Binttii were released during 1981 before conflicts with other members forced him out of the band. "Red Nettle" was included on NME compilation C81 and "Third Secret" appeared on Cherry Red compilation Perspectives and Distortion. Work had already started on the "A New Form of Beauty" project while Bintti was with the band, but after he was replaced by Mary D'Nellon (né David Kelly) on drums, some of his tracks were rerecorded and his name was not included in the credits. He later formed the project Princess Tinymeat.

"A New Form of Beauty" was a project that originally contained four chapters and was released in various formats: a 7" single, 10" single and 12" EP released in 1981, and a cassette issued in 1982. All four parts were later collected as the A New Form of Beauty Parts 1-4 compilation album. The project also included two additional pieces, the unpublished book A New Form of Beauty 6 and the unreleased film A New Form of Beauty 7.

In November 1982, the Virgin Prunes released their debut studio album, ...If I Die, I Die (produced by Colin Newman of Wire), as well as the double 10" EP Hérésie, a French box set. Commissioned by Yann Farcy after seeing them perform at the Rex Club in Paris, Hérésie was based on a loose examination of insanity. In 1984, both Guggi and Dik Evans, unhappy with the music business, left the band. This forced drummer D'Nellon to switch to guitar and allowed Pod to return as the band's drummer. The Virgin Prunes started to record but abandoned the unreleased album Sons Find Devils.

A retrospective video titled Sons Find Devils - A Live Retrospective 1981-1983 was released in 1986 by Ikon; this video had nothing to do with the unreleased album of the same name. In April 1985, rarities compilation Over the Rainbow was released.

In July 1986, the band, now a four-piece, finally released a second studio album, The Moon Looked Down and Laughed (including recordings of music written for Sons Find Devils). Later that year, Friday left the group. His departure was confirmed in the liner notes of the band's 1987 live album The Hidden Lie, which contained a short statement confirming the band's breakup.

After disbanding as Virgin Prunes, D'Nellon, Strongman and Busaras formed an offshoot group called The Prunes, which released three albums between 1988 and 1991 (1988's Lite Fantastik, 1989's Nada, and 1991's Blossoms & Blood ). Dik Evans played on ”Lite Fantastik" while 17-year-old Justin Kavanagh (aka Valley Limberg) from the Dublin hardcore band Mutant Asylum took the helm as guitarist for "Blossoms & Blood".

On 4 October 2009, three original members of the band (Friday, Guggi and Dik Evans) performed two classic Virgin Prunes songs, "Sweethome Under White Clouds" and "Caucasian Walk", at Carnegie Hall as part of "An Evening with Gavin Friday and Friends", to celebrate Friday's 50th birthday. J.G. Thirlwell appeared with them as backing vocalist.

== Discography ==
=== Albums ===
==== Studio albums ====
Title	Album details	Peak chart positions
Title	Album details	UK Indie
...If I Die, I Die	Released: November 1982; Label: Rough Trade; Formats: LP	8
The Moon Looked Down and Laughed	Released: July 1986; Label: Baby, Touch and Go; Formats: CD, LP, MC	5

==== Live albums ====
Title	Album details
The Hidden Lie (Live in Paris 6/6/86)	Released: May 1987; Label: Baby; Formats: CD, LP, MC; France-only release
Sons Find Devils	Released: 13 January 1998; Label: Cleopatra; Formats: CD; US-only release

==== Compilation albums ====
Title	Album details	Peak chart positions
Title	Album details	UK Indie
A New Form of Beauty Parts 1–4	Released: 1983; Label: Italian; Formats: 2xLP; Italy-only release	—
Over the Rainbow (A Compilation of Rarities 1981–1983)	Released: April 1985; Label: Baby; Formats: CD, LP, MC; France-only release	22
Artfuck: A Compilation of Rarities (1980–1983)	Released: 1993; Label: New Rose; Formats: CD; France-only release	—
Over the Rainbow (A Compilation of Rarities 1980–1984)	Released: 4 October 2004; Label: The Grey Area; Formats: 2xCD	—
"—" denotes releases that did not chart or were not released in that territory.

==== Video albums ====
Title	Album details
Sons Find Devils – A Live Retrospective 1981–1983	Released: June 1986; Label: Ikon; Formats: VHS, Betamax

=== EPs ===
Title	Album details	Peak chart positions
Title	Album details	UK Indie
A New Form of Beauty 1	Released: October 1981; Label: Rough Trade; Formats: 7"	44
A New Form of Beauty 2	Released: November 1981; Label: Rough Trade; Formats: 10"	47
A New Form of Beauty 3	Released: November 1981; Label: Rough Trade; Formats: 12"	—
A New Form of Beauty 4	Released: February 1982; Label: Rough Trade; Formats: MC	—
Heresie	Released: November 1982; Label: L'invitation au suicide; Formats: 2x10"; France-only release	—
An Extended Play	Released: 4 October 2004; Label: The Grey Area; Formats: 12"	—
"—" denotes releases that did not chart or were not released in that territory.

=== Singles ===
Title	Year	Peak chart positions
Title	Year	UK Indie
"Twenty Tens (I've Been Smoking All Night)"	1981	25
"Moments and Mine (Despite Straight Lines)"	1981	50
"Pagan Lovesong"	1982	13
"Baby Turns Blue"	1982	15
"Love Lasts Forever"	1986	18
"Don't Look Back"	1986	—
"Baby Turns Blue" (Director's Cut)	2004	—
"—" denotes releases that did not chart.

==== Selected compilation appearances ====
- "Red Nettle" on C81 (1981, Rough Trade/NME)
- "Third Secret" on Perspectives and Distortion (1981, Cherry Red)
- "Jigsaw Mentallama" on Vinyl Magazine #9 flexi disc (1981, Vinyl Magazine)
- "Mad Bird in the Wood" on Dokument: Ten Highlights in the History of Popular Music 1981>1982 (1982, Roadrunner)

== Literature ==
- Rolf Vasellari: The Faculties of a Broken Heart (1985, Black Sheep Press)
