= Guggi =

Irish artist and musician

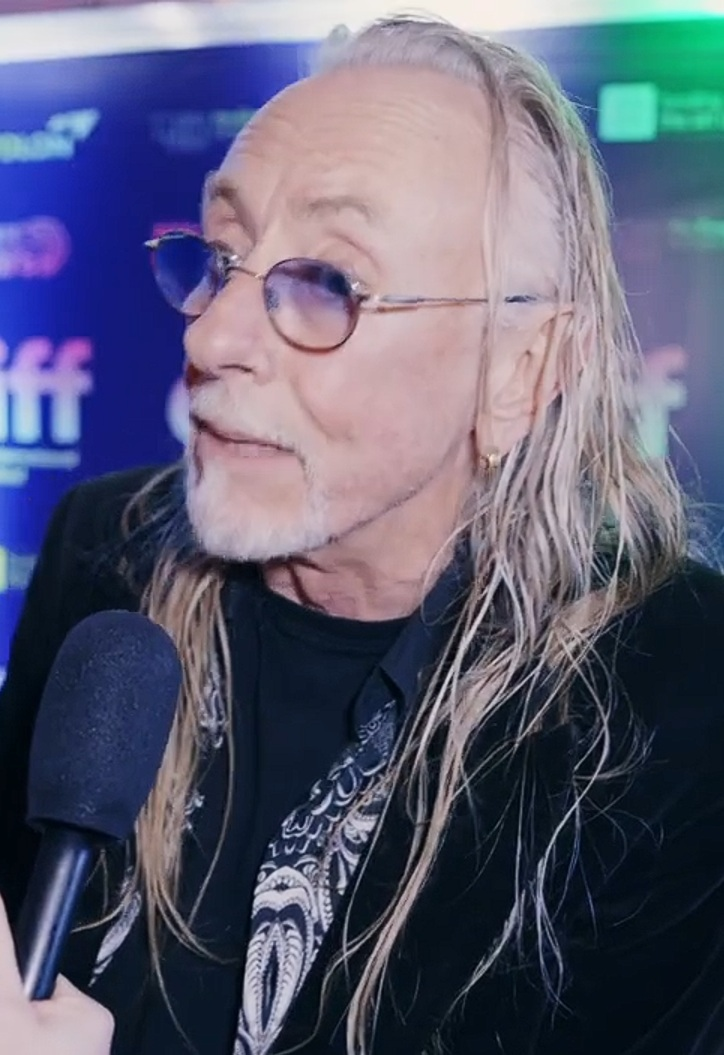
- Guggi at DIFF 2026

Background information
- Born: Derek Rowen; Dublin, Ireland
- Genre: Post-punk
- Occupation: Vocals

Derek Rowen, better known as Guggi, is an Irish artist and musician who was once a member of the post-punk band Virgin Prunes.

== Early life ==
Derek Rowen grew up with and remains best friends with U2's Bono, who gave him his nickname.

== Career ==
The Virgin Prunes were founded in 1977 by vocalists Guggi, Gavin Friday (né Fionan Hanvey), and Dave-iD Busaras; guitarist Dik Evans (brother of U2's The Edge); bassist Strongman (Trevor Rowen, brother of Guggi); and drummer Pod (Anthony Murphy). Known for their outrageous and controversial stage performances, the band began playing small shows in Dublin and gained a cult audience. The band released a single, "Moments and Mine (Despite Straight Lines)", on 27 June 1981. In November 1982, the Virgin Prunes released their debut studio album, ...If I Die, I Die (produced by Colin Newman of Wire), as well as the double 10" EP Hérésie, a French box set. In 1984, Guggi left the band.

Guggi left the Virgin Prunes to dedicate himself to painting.

== Personal life ==
Guggi has five sons, the eldest with his first partner and four with his ex-wife Sybille. He lives in Killiney with his partner Gabriella Janni.
