= Dik Evans =

Irish alternative rock guitarist, early U2 member

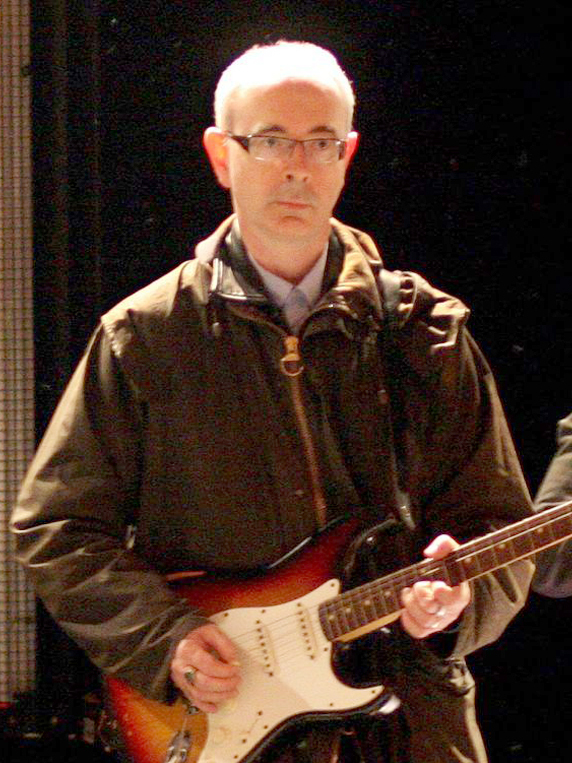
- Evans performing in November 2011

Background information
- Born: Richard G. Evans; 1957 (age 68–69); Barking, Essex, England
- Origin: Dublin, Ireland
- Genres: Art rock, post-punk, gothic rock, alternative rock
- Occupation: Musician
- Instrument: Guitar
- Years active: 1976–present
- Formerly of: Virgin Prunes, U2

Richard G. "Dik" Evans (born 1957) is a British-Irish musician. He is a co-founder and guitarist of the band Virgin Prunes, and a co-founder and early guitarist of the band that later became U2. He is the older brother of U2 guitarist The Edge.

== Early life ==
Richard G. Evans was born in Barking in 1957, the son of Welsh parents. His younger brother David is a guitarist better known by his stage name The Edge. At a young age, the family moved to Ireland. Evans first began to learn how to play guitar with an acoustic guitar bought by his brother, which the two shared.

== Career ==
The band that would eventually be named U2 formed in Dublin on 25 September 1976. Dik and his brother Dave were two of six people to respond to a note that Larry Mullen Jr. posted on the notice board at Mount Temple Comprehensive School in search of musicians for a new band. The group set up in Mullen's kitchen, with the Evans brothers on guitar; at the first meeting, the duo shared a single home-made instrument between them. They soon whittled down the lineup to a five-piece and settled on the name "Feedback" because it was one of the few technical terms they knew. Most of their initial material consisted of cover songs, which the band admitted was not their forte. Some of the earliest influences on the band were emerging punk rock acts, such as the Jam, the Clash, Buzzcocks, and Sex Pistols. The popularity of punk rock convinced the group that musical proficiency was not a prerequisite to success.

In April 1977, Feedback played their first gig for a paying audience at St. Fintan's High School. Shortly after, the band changed their name to "The Hype". Dik, who was older than the other band members and by this time at college, was becoming the odd man out. The rest of the band was leaning towards the idea of a four-piece ensemble. In March 1978, the group changed their name to "U2". That same month, U2, as a four-piece without Dik, won a talent contest in Limerick sponsored by Harp Lager and the Evening Press. The win was an important milestone and affirmation for the fledgling band. Within a few days, Dik was officially phased out of the band with a farewell concert at the Presbyterian Church Hall in Howth. During the show, which featured the group playing cover songs as the Hype, Dik ceremonially walked offstage. The remaining four band members returned later in the concert to play original material as U2. Therefore, Dik was a member of the band that became U2 for 1 year, 5 months & 8 days.

Evans was later a founding member of Dublin-based band Virgin Prunes and their guitarist from 1977 to 1984. He co-founded the band The Kid Sisters, later known as The Screech Owls, along with the American musician Deborah "Debbie" Schow.

Recent solo work includes contributions to Snakes & Ladders – A Festival of New Irish Music, curated by composer and former Virgin Prunes' band member, Daniel Figgis.
