= Gavin Friday =

Irish singer and songwriter (born 1959)

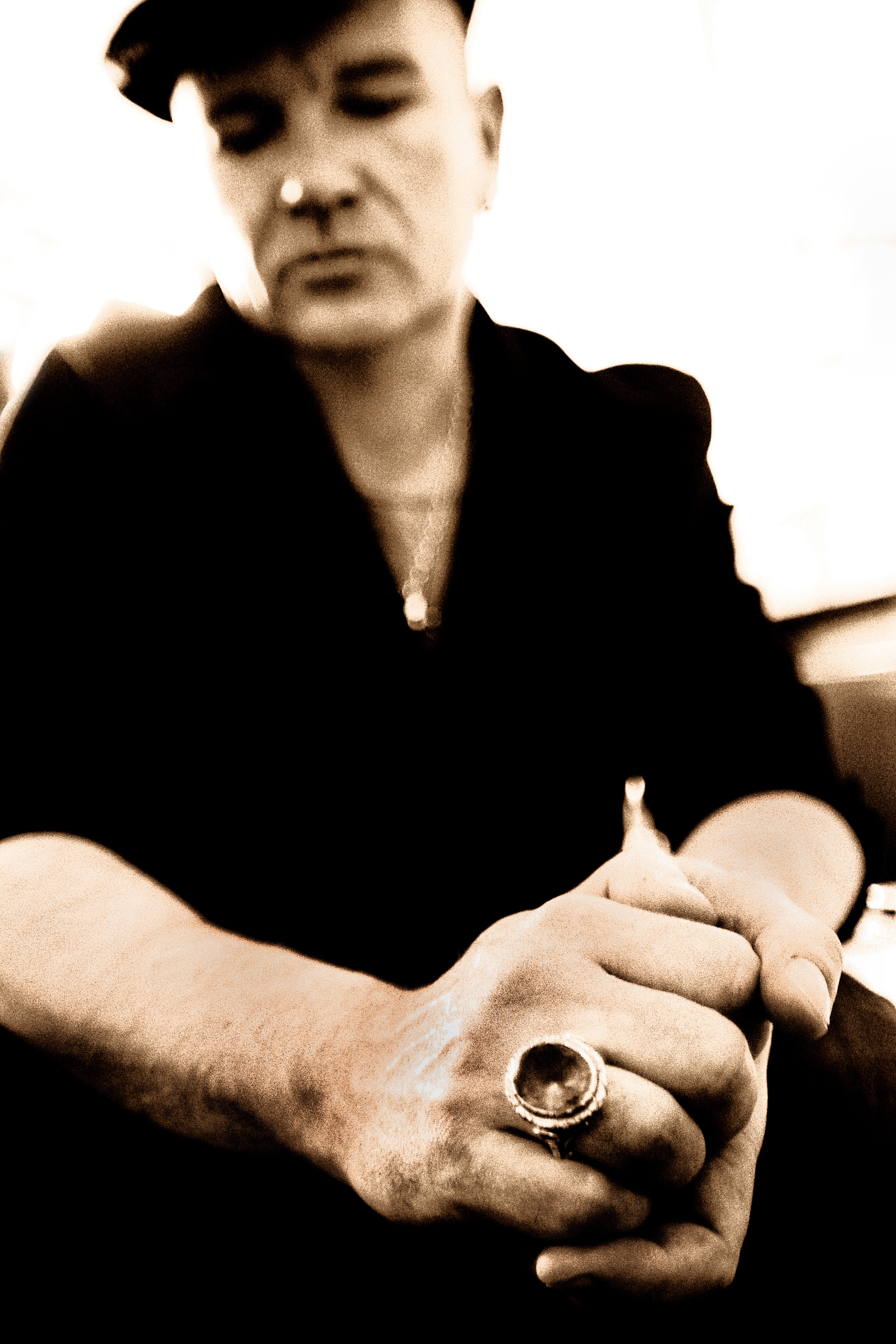
- Friday in 2007

Background information
- Born: Fionán Martin Hanvey; 8 October 1959 (age 66); Dublin, Ireland
- Genre: Alternative rock
- Occupations: Vocalist, musician, singer-songwriter, producer, actor
- Instrument: Vocals
- Years active: 1977–present
- Labels: Island, Rubyworks
- Website: gavinfriday.com

Gavin Friday (born Fionán Martin Hanvey, 8 October 1959) is an Irish singer and songwriter, composer, actor and painter, best known as a founding member of the post-punk group The Virgin Prunes.

== Early life ==
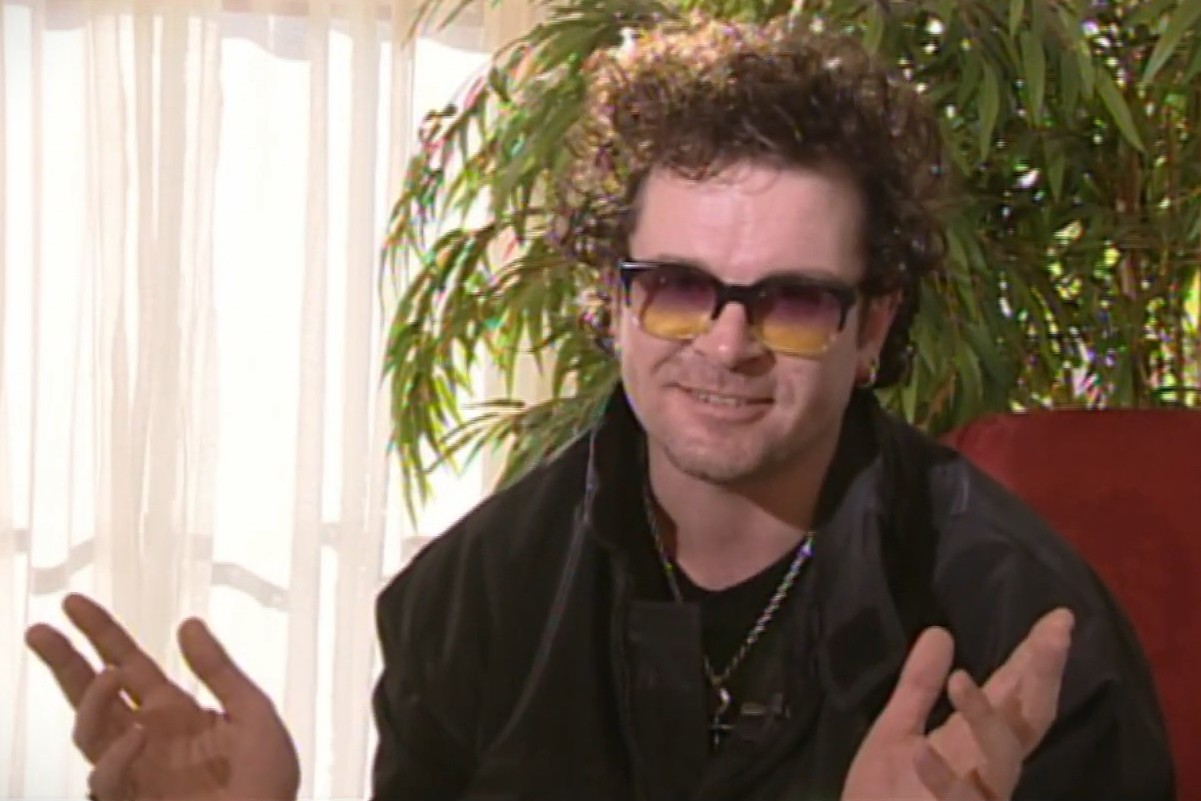
Friday in the early 2000s

Fionan Hanvey was born in Dublin and attended primary and post-primary schools in Ballygall, a neighbourhood on Dublin's Northside, between Finglas and Glasnevin. When he was fourteen years old and living on Cedarwood Road, between Finglas and Ballymun, he met Bono and Guggi at a party to which he had not been invited. Bono said: "We caught him trying to steal something of the house. Classic teenage stuff... but we became friends."

== Career ==
Friday was a founding member of the post-punk group The Virgin Prunes and has recorded several solo albums and soundtracks.

In 1986, after the demise of the Virgin Prunes, Friday devoted himself to painting for a while, sharing a studio with Bono, Guggi and Charlie Whisker. This resulted in the exhibition Four Artists – Many Wednesdays (1988) at Dublin's Hendricks Gallery. He, Guggi and Whisker showed paintings, while Bono opted to exhibit photos taken in Ethiopia. Friday's part of the show was entitled I didn't come up the Liffey in a bubble, an expression often used by his father.

His main collaborator between 1987 and 2005 was multi-instrumentalist, Maurice Seezer. They signed to Island Records in 1988 and released three albums together, before parting with the company in 1996. Later, Friday and Seezer composed the score for the Jim Sheridan films The Boxer and In America which was nominated for Best Original Film Score in the 2004 Ivor Novello Awards.

He has maintained a close friendship with U2's Bono since both were children, and they collaborated on the soundtrack for the Jim Sheridan film In the Name of the Father, including the title track, "Billy Boola" and "You Made Me the Thief of Your Heart", which was sung by Sinéad O'Connor and nominated for a Golden Globe for Best Original Song. In 2003 they wrote "Time Enough for Tears", the original theme tune for Sheridan's film In America, as sung by Andrea Corr. The song was nominated for a Golden Globe Award for Best Original Song.

In 1995 he performed "Look What You've Done (To My Skin)," one of two songs (the other sung by P.J. Harvey) written by Philip Ridley and Nick Bicat for Ridley's second feature film as writer and director, The Passion of Darkly Noon.

In 2005 Friday and Seezer collaborated with Quincy Jones on incidental music for the 50 Cent biopic Get Rich or Die Tryin'. In 2001 they scored the film Disco Pigs by Kirsten Sheridan. Two years later Friday and Seezer and their ensemble also collaborated with Bono on Peter & the Wolf in aid of the Irish Hospice Foundation.

In September 2006 a 2-CD collection of sea shanties called Rogue's Gallery: Pirate Ballads, Sea Songs, and Chanteys, produced by Hal Willner, was released on the ANTI- label. Friday contributes to two tracks including the lewd "Baltimore Whores" and "Bully in the Alley" with ex-Virgin Prunes bandmates Guggi and Dave-id. The reunion of Friday, Guggi and Dave-id was the first time they had recorded together since the Virgin Prunes broke up in 1985.

Friday worked again with Hal Willner in June 2007, appearing in the concert "Forest of No Return – the Vintage Disney Songbook" as part of the Meltdown Festival presented at London's newly reopened Royal Festival Hall. Sharing a stage with artists such as Grace Jones, Nick Cave, Pete Doherty and curator Jarvis Cocker, Friday performed the Disney songs "The Siamese Cat Song" and "Castle in Spain".

Taking time out from work on his fourth solo album with Herb Macken, Friday teamed up with English composer, Gavin Bryars, the Royal Shakespeare Company and Opera North for a new interpretation of Shakespeare's Sonnets touring as part of the 2007 Complete Works Festival. Opening in Stratford-Upon-Avon, Friday presented his take on Sonnet 40 ('Take all my loves, my love, yea, take them all') and narrated Bryars' 40-minute piece 'Nothing Like The Sun'. Friday and Macken composed the music for the Patrick McCabe play, The Revenant. The Revenant opened as part of the 2007 Galway Arts Festival. The play's main theme is entitled 'Dreamland'.

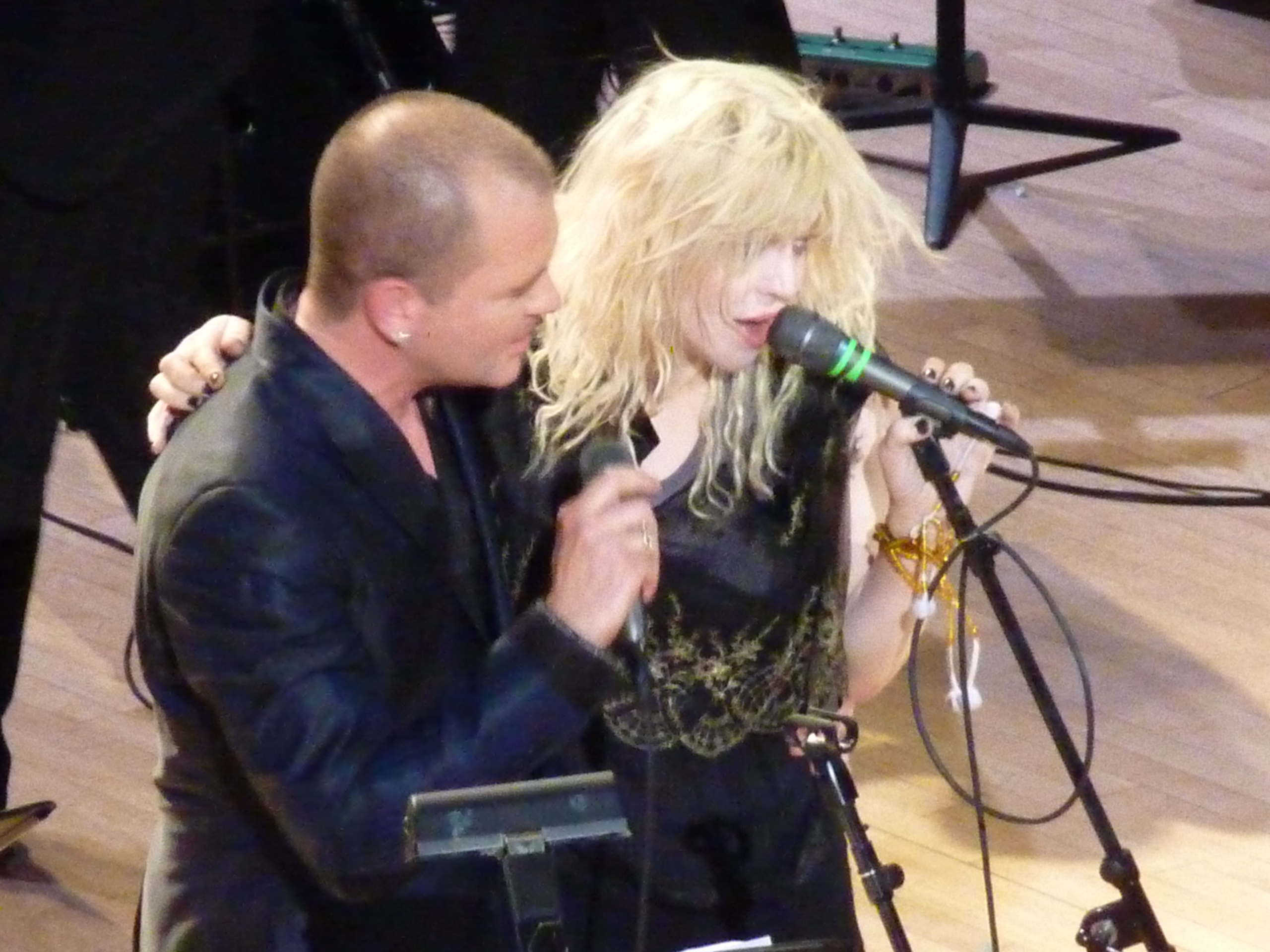
Friday, left, with Courtney Love at Carnegie Hall in 2009

In 2009, Friday and Macken worked on Friday's fourth studio album, set for release in 2010. On 6 April 2010 Record company Rubyworks announced they signed Gavin Friday and that a new album was on its way. The new CD was titled catholic and was released in Ireland on Good Friday: 22 April 2011.

== Filmography ==
After contributing to the documentary Aidan Walsh: Master of the Universe (2000), Friday's first acting experience was in the Kirsten Sheridan film Disco Pigs (2001), in which he had a bit part.

In 2005 Gavin Friday played Billy Hatchett in the Neil Jordan film Breakfast on Pluto based on Irish author Patrick McCabe's book, which had been influenced by Friday's album Shag Tobacco. On the soundtrack he sings "Wig Wam Bam" and "Sand", a duet with Cillian Murphy.

== Discography ==
=== Albums ===
- Each Man Kills the Thing He Loves (1989)
- Adam 'n' Eve (1992)
- Shag Tobacco (1995)
- Peter and the Wolf (2002)
- Catholic (2011)
- Ecce Homo (2024)

=== Singles ===
- "You Can't Always Get What You Want" with Simon Carmody (1987)
- "Each Man Kills The Things He Loves" (1988)
- "You Take Away the Sun" (1989)
- "Man of Misfortune" (1989)
- "I Want to Live" (1992)
- "King of Trash" (1992)
- "Falling off the Edge of the World" (1993)
- "In the Name of the Father" with Bono (1994) – IRE No. 15, AUS No. 56
- "Angel" (1995) – soundtrack from the film William Shakespeare's Romeo + Juliet
- "You, Me and World War III" (1996)

=== Soundtracks ===
- Bad Influence (1990)
- Short Cuts (1993)
- In the Name of the Father (1993)
- William Shakespeare's Romeo + Juliet (1996)
- Mission: Impossible (1996)
- Basquiat (1996)
- The Boxer (1997)
- Moulin Rouge! (2001)
- Breakfast on Pluto (2005)

=== Scores ===
- Angel Baby (1996)
- The Boxer (1997)
- In America (2003)
- Get Rich or Die Tryin' (2005)

=== Collaborations ===
In 1983, Friday appeared on the title track of Dave Ball's In Strict Tempo. In 1984, he collaborated with cult English post-punk group The Fall, on three tracks: "Copped It" and "Stephen Song" appeared on the album The Wonderful and Frightening World of The Fall, and "Clear Off!" was a track on the "Call For Escape Route" EP. On all three tracks, Friday and Fall singer Mark E. Smith alternated vocals, occasionally backing each other up. In the same year Friday provided vocals for the track "The Tenderness of Wolves" on the album Scatology by Coil. Twelve years later, Friday collaborated with the Heads (former members of Talking Heads minus David Byrne) on a song called "Blue Blue Moon." This was included as the last of 12 tracks on the Heads' 1996 album No Talking, Just Head. The song is credited to Gavin Friday, Chris Frantz, Jerry Harrison, T. "Blast" Murray and Tina Weymouth.

In 2010, Friday collaborated with David Ball again on a cover of Suicide's "Ghost Rider" for the Alan Vega 70th Birthday Limited Edition EP Series. In 2011, he contributed a cover version of "The Fly" to AHK-toong BAY-bi Covered, a tribute album to U2's Achtung Baby. In 2013, Friday collaborated with Shannon McNally on the traditional "Tom's Gone to Hilo" for the Sea shanty-compilation Son of Rogues Gallery: Pirate Ballads, Sea Songs & Chanteys (2013).

== Personal life ==
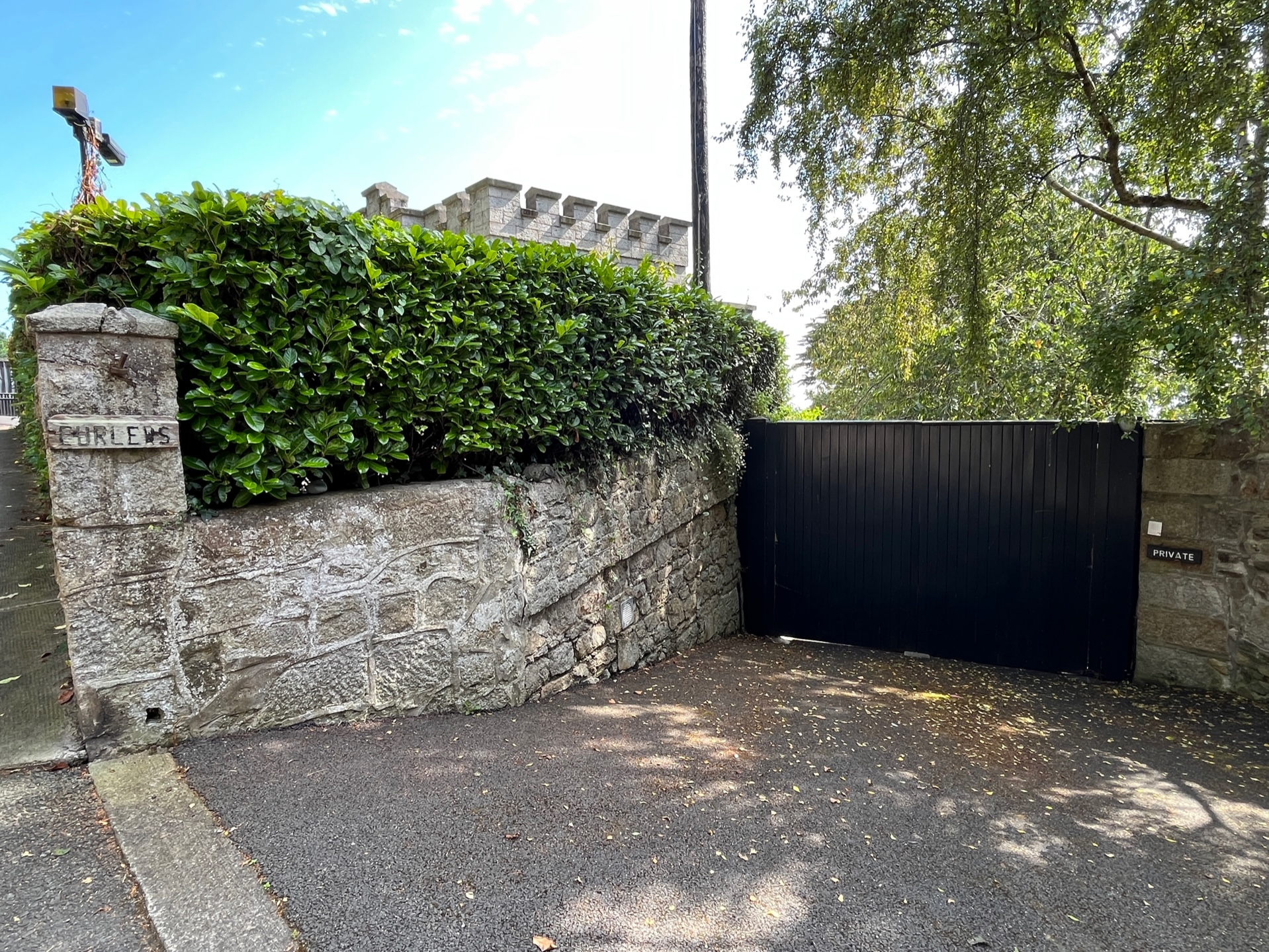
Entrance to Friday's former home on Vico Road, Killiney, County Dublin

Friday lived for many years in a house on Vico Road, Killiney, a southern suburb of Dublin, next door to Bono and his wife Ali Hewson; he is godfather to their daughter, actress Eve Hewson. Around 2021, he moved to the south Dublin suburb of Rathmines.

Following the release of his 2024 album Ecce Homo, Friday came out as queer.
