= True (The Nevers) =

- The Nevers episode
- Episode no.: Season 1 Episode 6
- Directed by: Zetna Fuentes
- Written by: Jane Espenson
- Cinematography by: Richard Donnelly
- Editing by: Lisa Lassek
- Original air date: May 16, 2021
- Running time: 64 minutes

Guest appearances
- Claudia Black as the Stripe; Domenique Fragale as Beth Cassini; Pui Fan Lee as Su Ping Lim; Brett Curtis as George; Okezie Morro as Crescent; Ellora Torchia as Knitter; John Macmillan as Byner; Matthew Marsh as Major Greenbone; Nicholas Nunn as Boot; Rita Bernard-Shaw as Second Boot; Ravi Aujla as Scientist; Nelly Currant as Jenny; Lee Armstrong as Varnum; Catherine Skinner as Gert; Daniel Hoffmann-Gill as Thomas True; Nicola Sloane as Mama True; Glen Davies as Dr. Campbell; Terence Frisch as Solicitor; Zee Asha as Matron; Mark O'Sullivan as Orderly; Abigail Thaw as Mrs. Hundley; Stacha Hicks as Nurse #1; Anna Munden as Nurse #2; Toby Mace as Predatory Man; Freya Parker as Doris

Episode chronology
| ← Previous "Hanged" | Next → "It's a Good Day" |

"True" is the sixth episode of the American science fiction drama television series The Nevers, serving as the last episode of the first part of the first season. The episode was directed by Zetna Fuentes and written by executive producer Jane Espenson. It originally aired on HBO on May 16, 2021, and also was available on HBO Max on the same date.

The series is set in Victorian era London and follows a group of people, mostly women, known as the Touched, who suddenly manifest abnormal abilities. Among them are Amalia True, a mysterious and quick-fisted widow, and her best friend Penance Adair, a brilliant inventor. The episode deviates from the show's formula. Instead, the episode is divided in 4 chapters that chronicle major events in the series. The episode is also the last episode with series creator Joss Whedon as executive producer before exiting the series in November 2020.

The episode received very positive reviews, who praised Laura Donnelly's performance as well as the new character development and delivering answers to some of the show's mysteries. The episode was watched by 0.552 million household viewers.

== Plot ==
=== Chapter One: Stripe ===
In a dystopian Earth future, a group of soldiers from a faction called the Planetary Defense Coalition (PDC) parachute into a destroyed city to infiltrate a station. The group engages another military faction named FreeLife who had already occupied the position. They take the sole survivor captive, Major Greenbone (Matthew Marsh), and enter the station. Two of the soldiers discuss the process of manifested alien traits achieved through "spores". Inside, they discover a garden. Further on, they find many corpses hanging above a Galanthi. Video logs reveal that a team of researchers had worked there and formed a friendly bond with the alien. FreeLife killed the team and hung the corpses in order to emotionally torture this Galanthi. The PDC soldiers discover that this Galanthi plans to leave Earth. The PDC speculate that the purpose of this Galanthi's travel is to return with reinforcements. After Greenbone informs all in the station that a nuclear weapon strike upon their position is imminent, he starts a chain of events that culminate with himself and the whole PDC team dying, except for a battle-hardened cynical aged female soldier with the rank of "Stripe" (Claudia Black). In despair at the loss of her fellow soldiers this Stripe returns to the garden and commits suicide by drinking an overdose of liquid narcotics. At her point of death, an ethereal form of the alien passes through her body recovering her persona. The ethereal alien and the Stripe persona escape the station through a portal.

=== Chapter Two: Molly ===
In 1890s London, a woman of unknown surname named Amalia "Molly" (Laura Donnelly) works as a baker. Even though she prefers an industrious man named Varnum Dale, she marries an uncouth butcher named Thomas True because of her distressed financial situation from being laid off - bemoaned by her as "God, makes his plans." Her married years consist of long hours as a delivery person and many miscarriages. To complicate matters, some years later Thomas dies, leaving her with the twin burdens of a huge household debt and an imposed position of nursemaid to his aged ill mother. Molly hears about the now prosperous Varnum but realizes she has no chance to be in his life now because he's married and is expecting a child. All these depressing events culminate in 1893 with her dying by suicide via drowning in the River Thames just as the Galanthi flies over London. Through a Galanthi spore entering the dead Molly's body, the persona of the Stripe replaces the now deceased persona of the original Molly.

=== Chapter Three: The Madwoman in the Thames ===
Eighteen ninety-three authorities take what is believed to be suicidal Molly who is now actually the Stripe in Molly's body to an asylum with her aggressive persona governing her behavior. The Stripe wonders what her purpose is in this time period, since she is the only human in this time period who knows about Galanthi spores. While in the asylum, she meets mentally ill and also spored Sarah (Amy Manson). The Stripe starts to get used to her new life, hiding her presence under Molly's name, Amalia True. While during medical care following a laceration, she and the asylum's physician, Horatio Cousens (Zackary Momoh), discover they both have powers after having been spored by the Galanthi and wonder about how many other people are now "touched". Doctor Edmund Hague (Denis O'Hare) arrives at the asylum, looking to investigate more about those affected by the alien event. Amalia meets with inquisitive and suspicious Hague and feigns ignorance and normalcy with respect to "turns." She then tells Sarah to be honest about everything to Hague, betraying Sarah to the unscrupulous Hague. Amalia starts practicing her time period-consistent manners and English accent to clandestine her real life. Eventually, duplicitous Lavinia (Olivia Williams) finds her and offers her control in her previously designated "Orphanage"-building, where she will gather Touched people. She will share control with another Touched, revealed to be Penance (Ann Skelly).

=== Chapter Four: True ===
Back in the present day of 1896, Amalia, Augie (Tom Riley), and Annie (Rochelle Neill) fight against soldiers beneath their base where they think the Galanthi is hidden. Amalia is separated from her team when she falls into a sinkhole. Traveling through the tunnels, Amalia finds the Galanthi. While she questions it, the tunnels begin to shake, and Amalia falls and goes through a series of flashbacks and future events. One of these includes Myrtle (Viola Prettejohn) speaking on behalf of the Galanthi, "Oh, Amalia. This is a long time from that little cave. This, I will need you to forget." When she regains consciousness, she is attacked by Hague's masked men but manages to escape. She returns to the Orphanage to meet with Penance, who just returned from her failed attempt to save Maladie. She decides it's time to tell the Orphanage about everything she knows and tells Penance that she is a Canadian and that her real name is Zephyr Alexis Navine. They embrace as one of Penance's inventions flies above them.

== Production ==
=== Development ===
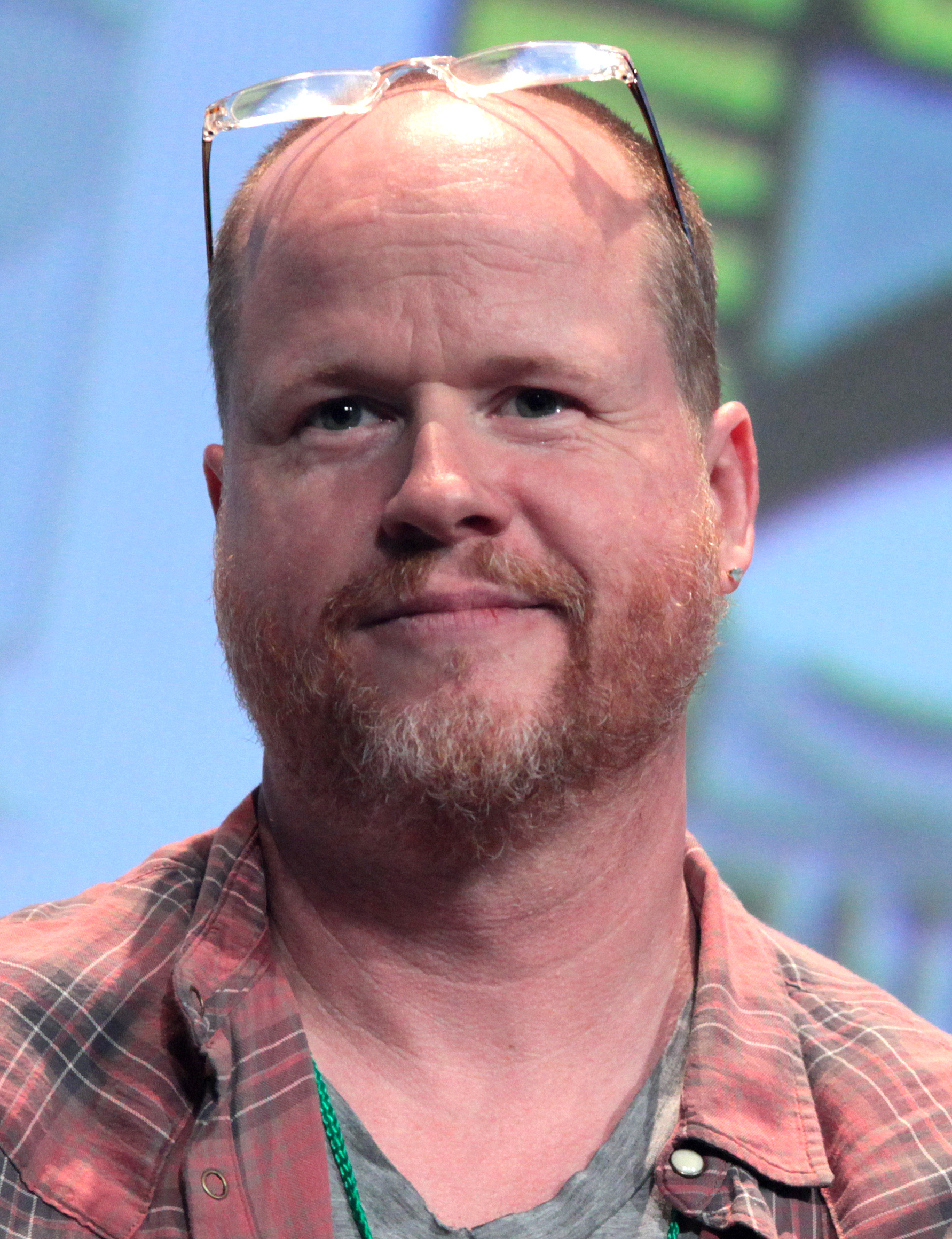
The episode marked Joss Whedon's last episode as executive producer and showrunner before stepping down in November 2020.

In March 2021, the episode's title was revealed as "True" and it was announced that executive producer Jane Espenson had written the episode while Zetna Fuentes had directed it.

This was Joss Whedon's last episode as executive producer before exiting the series in November 2020. Whedon said, "This year of unprecedented challenges has impacted my life and perspective in ways I could never have imagined, and while developing and producing The Nevers has been a joyful experience, I realize that the level of commitment required moving forward, combined with the physical challenges of making such a huge show during a global pandemic, is more than I can handle without the work beginning to suffer. I am genuinely exhausted, and am stepping back to martial my energy towards my own life, which is also at the brink of exciting change. I am deeply proud of the work we have done; I'm grateful to all my extraordinary cast and collaborators, and to HBO for the opportunity to shape yet another strange world. The Nevers is a true labor of love, but after two plus years of labor, love is about all I have to offer. It will never fade." An HBO spokeswoman was quoted as saying, "We have parted ways with Joss Whedon. We remain excited about the future of The Nevers and look forward to its premiere in the summer of 2021."

In January 2021, Philippa Goslett was announced as the new showrunner. In response to the accusations of workplace harassment against Whedon on his prior projects, HBO and HBO Max chief content officer Casey Bloys stated that "we had no complaints or no reports of inappropriate behavior" regarding his work on The Nevers.

Speaking to the break in the release schedule between episodes six and seven due to production issues, Bloys stated, "And there was kind of a natural narrative break at six. So that was the thought then was to air six episodes. So at least we had something to put out there for subscribers and fans." In March 2021, it was clarified that the first season was extended from 10 to 12 episodes, with the second part of the first season also consisting of 6 episodes with "True" serving as the mid-season finale.

=== Writing ===
The episode delved more into the background of Amalia True, revealing her real name as Molly and being possessed by Stripe's soul in a scene set 100 years into the future, which was deemed "mindblowing" by fellow actor James Norton. Laura Donnelly explained Amalia's journey, "I think that she has a lot to wrestle with within herself. You know, I think that she’s got a lot of stuff that she needs to come to terms with, and I wonder about that, especially as an emotional arc. And I’ll be really interested to see how she deals with any change in structure like that and how she also deals with kind of the reckonings of her soul that seem to be just coming into clearer focus." She also detailed having Claudia Black play her original character and having to emulate her personality, "I went in and watched a lot of their rehearsals and got some video footage of their rehearsals and stuff so I had a good idea of what it was that she was doing with that, but it was just amazing to watch the whole thing put together. It’s like the final piece of a puzzle that I didn’t even have any say in." Star Amy Manson also commented on the new revelation behind Maladie's past, "Reading Episode 6, I was aghast because of the storylines and because of where the storylines are going and will continue to go, and I’m sure, on other planets, or whatever is in store for us in the future."

== Reception ==
=== Ratings ===
In its original American broadcast, "True" was seen by an estimated 0.552 million household viewers and gained a 0.08 ratings share among adults aged 18–49, according to Nielsen Media Research. This was down from the previous episode, which was watched by 0.570 million and a 0.09 share in the 18-49 demo.

=== Critical reviews ===
Alan Sepinwall from Rolling Stone wrote, "So there are lessons here that Whedon's successor as showrunner, Philippa Goslett, can take as she and her collaborators continue the series without his involvement. And his departure likely means that future episodes won't feel quite so much like a remix of his greatest hits. The Galanthi give Stripe a second chance to get their story right. Now The Nevers has the same. Let's hope both take full advantage of that chance." Sepinwall would later put the episode on his "Top 10 Episodes of 2021" list, writing, "the meandering nature of the early episodes was replaced with real purpose and clarity in the bracing season finale, which traveled to the distant future, and then to events before the series had even begun, to explain exactly what was happening, who the show's chief heroine Amalia True really was, and why anyone should care about any of it. Hopefully, Whedon's successors can carry that momentum into a second season."

Roxana Hadadi from The A.V. Club gave it a B− and wrote, "Was it ambitious to load in all this backstory and exposition, use a whole-new vocabulary of terminology, and explain the horror of divisive nuclear war and the potential of the Galanthi in about 35 minutes? Absolutely. Was it messy? Also absolutely!" Darren Franlch from Entertainment Weekly gave it an A− and wrote, "Ironically, this final episode was the high point for the series as a non-chaotic piece of coherent drama. The exciting revelations about Amalia's past promise to redefine the show's future. If it has one."

Amanda Whitting from Vulture gave it a 3 out 5 star rating and wrote, "Last week, I opined that the world of The Nevers was contracting in ways that made plotlines crisper, relationships more legible, and the general flow of information easier to follow. I nearly felt that if a stranger asked me the question What is The Nevers about?, I could give them a perspicuous if lengthy explanation. Oh, how man makes plans, and Joss Whedon laughs. This series is completely batshit." Alec Bojalad from Den of Geek wrote, "There may have been more surprising twists in TV's recent past, but it's hard to recall a recent episode that upends a show's central premise so extremely, so relatively late into its run. And thanks to the coronavirus pandemic interrupting the show's production, The Nevers won't even be able to continue to pursue this rich dramatic vein until 'Part 2' of the show's first season arrives at a still-undetermined later date."
