= Pilot (The Nevers) =

- The Nevers episode
- Episode no.: Season 1 Episode 1
- Directed by: Joss Whedon
- Written by: Joss Whedon
- Cinematography by: Seamus McGarvey
- Editing by: Lisa Lassek
- Original air date: April 11, 2021
- Running time: 64 minutes

Guest appearances
- Martyn Ford as Nicholas Perbal; Dan Mersh as Mr. Haplisch; Phillipa Dunne as Mrs. Haplisch; Andrew Havill as Douglas Broome; Nicholas Farrell as Prince Albrecht; Tim Steed as Lord Allaven-Tyne; Rupert Vansittart as Lord Broughton; Tim Bentinck as General Pecking; Rachel Summers as Katherine Cousens; Abra Thompson as Hugo's Housemaid; Skye Lourie as Katie; Jay Simpson as Tunnel Foreman; Martin Bishop as Dr. Beldon; Nesba Crenshaw as Mrs. Beldon; Matt Butcher as Devil/Baritone; George Dawson as Hague's Assistant; Nick Bartlett as Drunken Man; Henri Charles as Newspaper Boy; Angus Brown as Beggar King's Henchman; Riley Holmes as Haplisch Child; Benito Rodriguez as Faust; Laura Sheerin as Marguerite

Episode chronology
| ← Previous — | Next → "Exposure" |

"Pilot" is the series premiere of the American science fiction drama television series The Nevers. The episode was written and directed by the series creator and executive producer Joss Whedon, his first television writing credit since the series premiere of Agents of S.H.I.E.L.D.. It originally aired on HBO on April 11, 2021, and also was available on HBO Max on the same date.

The series is set in Victorian era London and follows a group of people, mostly women, known as the Touched, who suddenly manifest abnormal abilities. Among them are Amalia True, a mysterious and quick-fisted widow, and her best friend Penance Adair, a brilliant inventor.

The series received a straight-to-series order from HBO in June 2018, after a bidding war with other networks and streaming services including Netflix. Laura Donnelly was the first actress to join the series in April 2019, with the rest of the cast joining in July 2019. Writers Jane Espenson and Douglas Petrie, who worked with Whedon on Buffy the Vampire Slayer, Angel and Firefly also joined the series. Filming started at London in July 2019 but production was shut down in spring 2020 due to the COVID-19 pandemic, with only five complete episodes. Filming resumed in September and production was completed by October. In November, 2020 Whedon was announced to be exiting the series, with Philippa Goslett being hired in January to replace him as showrunner.

The series premiere received mixed reviews from critics, who praised the performances from the cast and production design but criticized the writing, with many deeming it "over-stuffed" and "muddled". The episode was watched by 0.548 million household viewers. Despite this, the show scored the best debut for a new original series on HBO Max.

== Plot ==
In late 1890s London, Amalia True (Laura Donnelly) is part of St. Romaulda's Orphanage, a haven for the "Touched" (superpowered people) and her power is to see glimpses of the future. She and her best friend Penance Adair (Ann Skelly), who can control potential energy, visit Myrtle Haplisch (Viola Prettejohn), whose parents have chained to her bed after exhibiting powers and speaking in a mix of languages. Amalia and Penance realize Myrtle is being kidnapped by thugs and fight them, leading to a chase in the streets in their stagecoach but manage to flee in a motorcar. Amalia and Penance decide to take Myrtle to live with them at the orphanage. There, she's introduced to Horatio Cousens (Zackary Momoh), a doctor with healing powers; and Primrose Chattoway (Anna Devlin), a 10-feet tall girl.

Government officials begin discussing the events, with Lord Massen (Pip Torrens) deeming the Touched as dangers to society. Scotland Yard Inspector Frank Mundi (Ben Chaplin) investigates a murder on a factory, with a message "Behol My Works For I Am The Angle of Death" written on the wall; a worker thinks it's the work of a serial killer known as Maladie, but Mundi demurs, noting that "Maladie can spell." Augustus "Augie" Bidlow (Tom Riley) visits his friend, Hugo Swan (James Norton), owner of a private club, to ask for help in something involving the Touched. Amalia and Penance go to see Faust in the opera when their stagecoach is boarded by Declan Orrun (Nick Frost), who is known in the underground world as the Beggar King. Amalia asks for his help in finding more about the thugs who tried to kidnap Myrtle and he agrees, but threatens to cut her face if things go wrong. At the opera, Auggie accompanies his sister Lavinia (Olivia Williams), who runs the orphanage but has to use a wheelchair. During the performance, Maladie (Amy Manson) appears and kills an actor playing the Devil before one of her thugs uses a machine gun to kill part of the audience. But one of the actors, Mary Brighton (Eleanor Tomlinson) is revealed to have an angelic voice, which affects Amalia, Penance and Auggie. Maladie takes Mary and is pursued by Amalia but they manage to flee.

Detective Mundi once again investigates Maladie and questions Hugo about what happened but gets no information. Penance finds Amalia in an alley, having lost part of her dress during the chase. She comforts her and both try to understand what the song was that Mary sang during the performance. Meanwhile, a surgeon named Dr. Edmund Hague (Denis O'Hare) is shown to be medically torturing Touched people, in an attempt to understand their powers. He alludes to being the person who ordered the kidnapping of Myrtle earlier. A flashback reveals the events of what led to the creation of the Touched three years ago. An unknown flying aircraft passed over London, all while exposing the citizens to sparkles that fell onto some of them. Amongst the affected are Penance, Auggie, Mary, Dr. Cousens, Maladie, Lord Massen's daughter and Amalia, who was attempting suicide by drowning. Once the ship goes underground, everyone who had witnessed the event, quickly forget it and resume their activities. Only Maladie remembers the event as she tries to convince the others about it. Meanwhile, after getting touched by the sparkle, the drowned Amalia awakes and swims to the surface.

== Production ==
=== Development ===
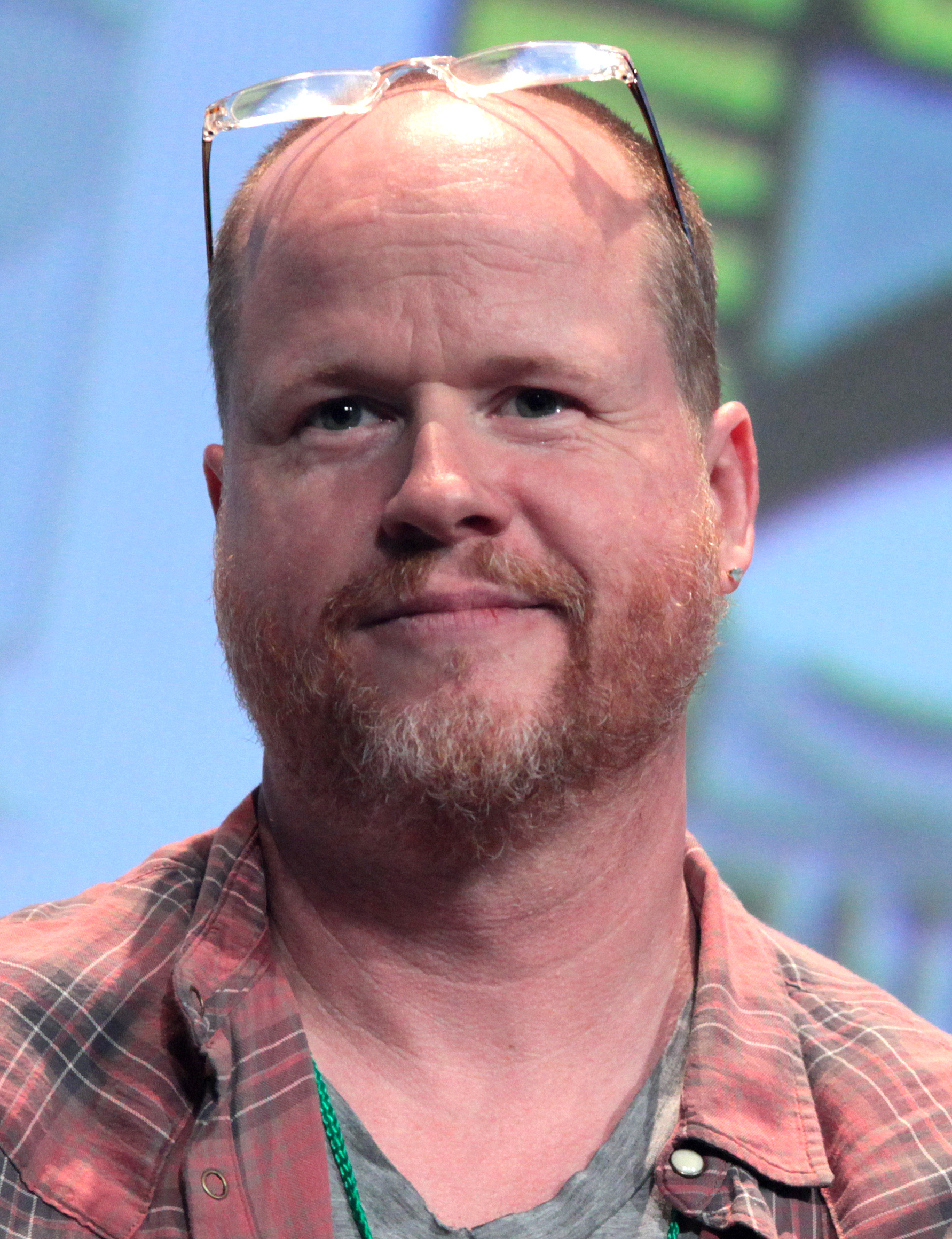
Joss Whedon wrote and directed the pilot episode.

On July 13, 2018, HBO announced that they gave a straight-to-series order to the show, after a bidding war with other networks and streaming services including Netflix. Whedon said, "I honestly couldn't be more excited. The Nevers is maybe the most ambitious narrative I've created, and I can't imagine a better home for it than HBO. Not only are they the masters of cinematic longform, but their instant understanding of my odd, intimate epic was as emotional as it was incisive. It's been too long since I created an entirely new fictional world, and the HBO team offers not just scope and experience, not just 'prestige,' but a passionate collaboration." Casey Bloys, HBO Programming President, said, "We have long been fans of the incredibly talented and prolific Joss Whedon and we can't think of a better project than The Nevers with which to welcome him to the HBO family. We look forward to meeting the strange, multifaceted characters of The Nevers, to learn their stories, see them in action and share them with our viewers. We're honored that Joss chose HBO as the place to build his ambitious new world and we are excited to get started."

Gemma Jackson served as the production designer for the show. She commented, "I read the script and took lots of images when I went to see him [Whedon], and I hit the spot with my research. Joss loved my ideas about the Galanthi [the aliens that help humanity], which had never been seen before. I think that made him excited. We started to talk about this world with these people having extraordinary things happen to them. It wasn't a straightforward process, ideas developed organically."

=== Casting ===
Laura Donnelly was the first actress to join the series in April 2019. Whedon spoke about her, "Laura Donnelly has charisma, wisdom and an anarchic precision that not only captures Amalia but defines her. She's fierce and she's funny – and I need both for the journey ahead." In July 2019, the rest of the cast was announced, with Olivia Williams, James Norton, Tom Riley, Ann Skelly, Ben Chaplin, Pip Torrens, Zackary Momoh, Amy Manson, Nick Frost, Rochelle Neil, Eleanor Tomlinson and Denis O'Hare joining the series. In August 2019, Kiran Sonia Sawar, Elizabeth Berrington, Ella Smith, Viola Prettejohn and Anna Devlin joined as series regulars.

=== Filming ===
On July 4, 2019, Whedon announced that principal photography had started, with filming occurring in London. The scenes at the opera were filmed in the New Wimbledon Theatre area. In order to film the scene where Mary used her angelic voice and its effect on its audience, executive producer Jane Espenson mentioned the use of a light effect that's not meant to symbolize an actual visible light that everyone in the set saw, which helped to see keep ambiguity in the scene. On August 14, Ann Skelly confirmed that filming for the episode had wrapped.

=== Design ===
Academy Award winner Christine Blundell served as the hair and makeup designer. She said that inspiration came from modern-day punk in order to help with the visual world of the series. The inspiration for Penance's motocar originated at a vintage car show, with Jackson referring to a 1920s prototype for an amphibian vehicle with overlapping metal panels. "As we worked on the design and how to make the carriage apparently birth the car, we found ourselves looking at organic shapes, crustaceans, beetles. We needed something which telescopically folded into itself in preparation for flying out into the world. Once we had found the basis for the car, the rest was focused on using great materials like metals, copper, leather, and anything else required to hold it all together and to be strong enough for some hard work."

For the last scene with the spaceship, Jackson took inspiration from research belonging to known zoologist Ernst Haeckel, commenting, "The inspirations came from underwater things with natural membrane and skin and extraordinary organisms that grow out of themselves and multiply. I also got a sense that it had its own moisture feel to it, sort of like your eye has. And one wants to have the feeling of a living, breathing organism inside it. It had to have an exoskeleton with a soft, pounding interior, which is all glowing. It’s an incredibly powerful creature that’s there for all the good reasons as the source of empowerment."

== Reception ==
=== Ratings ===
In its original American broadcast, "Pilot" was seen by an estimated 0.548 million household viewers and gained a 0.10 ratings share among adults aged 18–49, according to Nielsen Media Research. On HBO Max, the show scored the best debut for a new original series on the site and drew over 1.4 million viewers across linear telecasts and digital.

=== Critical reviews ===
The episode received mixed reviews from critics. Alan Sepinwall from Rolling Stone gave it a 2.5 out of 5 rating and wrote, "The Nevers still feels like a Joss Whedon show, for good and for ill, with most of the downside that comes from his work and only occasional glimmers of what made him beloved before he became toxic." Ben Travers from IndieWire gave it a C+ and wrote, "The Nevers' inconsistencies can make for a maddening viewing experience — sending you from the edge of your seat to sprawled out on the floor, trying to find your eyes after they rolled out of your head — and far too many parts make zero sense whatsoever. But I'd be lying if I said I'm done with The Nevers. Whether it's the allure of watching a trainwreck in motion or that the intermittent flourishes add up to just enough entertainment, I'll at least catch the final two episodes of Part 1. I can't say never to The Nevers, even if I have no idea what it means."

Judy Berman from TIME wrote, "On top of the character dumps, they give us prolonged fight scenes, cool superpowers, bare breasts—enough distractions that we hopefully forget to look for a story worth telling. There is a lot going on in The Nevers. The only thing it seems to lack is a point." Brian Lowry from CNN wrote, "Given the premise, The Nevers still has the potential to regain its momentum, and as they say, never say never. But watching beyond the premiere, it's hard not to conclude that the series simply lacks the right touch." Daniel Fienberg from The Hollywood Reporter wrote, "A generous take on The Nevers is that it's a fin de siècle X-Men, or maybe a Victorian Watchmen. A less generous take is that it's a more expensive version of Fox's The Gifted, one made without any clear understanding of hour-long cable narrative rhythm, structure or momentum."

Not all reviews were negative. Lorraine Ali from the Los Angeles Times wrote, "The Nevers is a joy to watch and a thrill to follow. Supernatural realism, complex storytelling, fantastical powers and topical realties meet in this smart, suspenseful and colorful production. A litany of nuanced characters keeps this otherworldly tale grounded. Suspenseful sleuthing and action-packed battles move the story along at a rapid clip. And all the lush scenery and ambitious wardrobe along the way." Adrian Horton from The Guardian gave it a 3 star rating out of 5 and wrote, "There's a genuinely intriguing anchor in their friendship, and in True's grappling with her intrusive past. Whether or not The Nevers cares to favor its characters over immensity in its later episodes remain to be seen, but I imagine viewers' patience with the Whedon-verse, and The Nevers' bloat, will be thin." Richard Roeper from Chicago Sun-Times gave it a 3 star rating out of 4 and wrote, "The Nevers is a dazzling visual feast with gorgeous sets and first-rate CGI, sly humor, ambitious and sometimes deeply moving set pieces and wonderful performances from the ensemble cast."
