= Undertaking (The Nevers) =

- The Nevers episode
- Episode no.: Season 1 Episode 4
- Directed by: David Semel
- Written by: Madhuri Shekar
- Cinematography by: Ben Smithard
- Editing by: Cheryl Potter
- Original air date: May 2, 2021
- Running time: 55 minutes

Guest appearances
- Sylvie Briggs as Clara; Pui Fan Lee as Su Ping Lim; Margaret Tuttle as Effie Boyle (Note: Amy Manson portrays Effie Boyle but is credited as Margaret Tuttle, a fake name.); Matt Emery as Detective Birch; Mofetoluwa Akande as Katherine Cousens; Sam Melvin as Purist; Alex Forman as Huge Purist; Christopher Dunne as Club Butler; Marcus Garvey as Gordy; Marc Bannerman as Bowler Hat; Ed Eales-White as Foreman; Lee Barnett as Jacobs; Jack Rolf as Warehouse Worker; Chris Kyriacou as Guard 1; Nick Pearse as Guard 2; Ian Alexander as Superintendent; Will Brown as Police Officer; Mauro Montoschi as Italian Cook; Elisha Mistretta as Cook's Daughter; Sam Graham as Vicar

Episode chronology
← Previous "Ignition"	Next → "Hanged"

"Undertaking" is the fourth episode of the American science fiction drama television series The Nevers. The episode was directed by David Semel and written by Madhuri Shekar. It originally aired on HBO on May 2, 2021 and also was available on HBO Max on the same date.

The series is set in Victorian era London and follows a group of people, mostly women, known as the Touched, who suddenly manifest abnormal abilities. Among them are Amalia True, a mysterious and quick-fisted widow, and her best friend Penance Adair, a brilliant inventor. The episode follows Amalia working with the women in the Orphanage to try to find Mary's murderer after the events of the previous episode while also trying to uncover a mole within her group.

The episode received mixed-to-positive reviews, with critics praising Amalia's new character development but criticizing the writing. The episode was watched by 0.515 million household viewers.

== Plot ==
The women from the Orphanage bury Mary after the events of the previous episode. When purists start bad-mouthing them, Mundi (Ben Chaplin) has officers arrest them. Amalia (Laura Donnelly) chose not to attend the funeral and has been going to bars, getting drunk, and starting fights with some of the patrons after trying to steal from them. When she returns to the orphanage, Penance (Ann Skelly) tries to comfort her but Amalia releases her frustration instead. Primrose (Anna Devlin) speaks with a crying Myrtle (Viola Prettejohn) in her room, trying to understand her drawings. She eventually finds out that Myrtle heard a secret message during Mary's song. They contact foreign members to try to decipher the message, which is just "Come before the dark." In the police station, Mundi questions the purists, who are frightened at finding that he is a former boxer and reveal that people hired them to crash the funeral and insult the women. Mundi then confronts Hugo (James Norton) and accuses him of sending them in order to scare the women and join his club but Hugo reassures him he had no involvement with the men.

Amalia, Penance, Lucy (Elizabeth Berrington), Annie (Rochelle Neil) and Cousens (Zackary Momoh) discuss a list of suspects behind Mary's murder, with Maladie, Lord Massen, the Beggar King and Augie deemed suspects. Penance talks with Augie (Tom Riley) to try to make him confess but he maintains his innocence. Annie tries to confront the Beggar King but is held off by one of his henchmen, Nimble Jack (Vinnie Heaven), a Touched with the power to create a shield and is told that he was not involved in Mary's murder. Amalia visits Lord Massen (Pip Torrens), who states his innocence, suggesting that Mary was murdered for representing hope for the Touched. The last comment makes Amalia believe he had a part in the murder and plans to destroy his business in the warehouse dock. Mundi finds Maladie (Amy Manson) strangling his superintendent, where she reveals she was in the funeral before escaping. Mundi follows her and manages to get her unconscious.

Amalia, Lucy and Annie meet at the docks to blow the warehouse. However, Amalia exposes Lucy as Lord Massen's spy. Lucy admits working for him as he promised to give her a cure to her power, where she breaks everything she touches. She attempts to flee and gets into a fight with Amalia. Amalia holds her at gunpoint but decides to let her go in a boat. Lucy reveals the location of the real munitions and Annie blows up the warehouse. Back in the Orphanage, Amalia tells Penance about Lucy's betrayal before being interrupted by Primrose, Harriet (Kiran Sonia Sawar) and Myrtle. They have found the complete message, which is directed at Amalia: "Amalia, my lonely soldier. I didn't leave you. I went inside the city. I was damaged... incomplete. I had to heal. Soon we will all be ready. But it's dark. There's a darkness. Find me. Let them help, those who will, but come below and find me. Come before the dark, and we can save..." with the last part being incomplete because of her death. Harriet believes that the message is not of Mary's, but someone else speaking through her.

== Production ==
=== Development ===
In March 2021, the episode's title was revealed as "Undertaking" and it was announced that Madhuri Shekar had written the episode while David Semel had directed it. This was Semel's second directing credit for the show.

== Reception ==
=== Ratings ===
In its original American broadcast, "Undertaking" was seen by an estimated 0.515 million household viewers and gained a 0.07 ratings share among adults aged 18–49, according to Nielsen Media Research. This was up from the previous episode, which was watched by 0.448 million and a 0.06 share in the 18-49 demo.

=== Critical reviews ===
Roxana Hadadi from The A.V. Club gave it a B and wrote, "Perhaps it’s a little silly to think that the message is coming from the vessel. But The Nevers has never really eased up on the endless intricacies of its plotting; the denseness of its premiere has only continued through 'Exposure,' 'Ignition,' and now 'Undertaking.' The result is that there's so much sprawl, and — I cannot say this enough — so many villains that I feel some pressure to buy whatever this story offers up through the remaining two episodes of this first half of the first season." Amanda Whitting from Vulture gave it a 2 out 5 star rating and wrote, "This mission is incomplete, noted. But what’s the complete mission look like? Every answer begets more questions, not because the world is getting more complicated, but because the answers are incomplete."
