= Exposure (The Nevers) =

- The Nevers episode
- Episode no.: Season 1 Episode 2
- Directed by: Joss Whedon
- Written by: Jane Espenson
- Cinematography by: Seamus McGarvey
- Editing by: Lisa Lassek
- Original air date: April 18, 2021
- Running time: 63 minutes

Guest appearances
- Domenique Fragale as Beth Cassini; Mark Benton as The Colonel; Sylvie Briggs as Clara; Matt Emery as Detective Birch; Rupert Vansittart as Lord Broughton; Andrew Havill as Douglas Broome; Alison Pargeter as Kindly Old Woman; Jack Wheatley as Nigel Blodgett; George Dawson as Hague's Assistant; Helen Bang as Elegant Lady; Alex MacQueen as Mr. Oldenham; Angela Sant'Albano as Rosa; Madeleine Wilson as Lady Whisper; Deborah Moore as Fancy Lady; James Coombes as Older Gentleman; Rosalind Adler as Society Lady; Michael James as Teen Boy; Finn Bennett as Pink Shirt; Andy Burse as Pocket Square; Matt Brewer as Man

Episode chronology
← Previous "Pilot"	Next → "Ignition"

"Exposure" is the second episode of the American science fiction drama television series The Nevers. The episode was directed by the series creator and executive producer Joss Whedon and written by executive producer Jane Espenson, who previously worked with Whedon on Buffy the Vampire Slayer, Angel, Firefly and Dollhouse. It originally aired on HBO on April 18, 2021 and also was available on HBO Max on the same date.

The series is set in Victorian era London and follows a group of people, mostly women, known as the Touched, who suddenly manifest abnormal abilities. Among them are Amalia True, a mysterious and quick-fisted widow, and her best friend Penance Adair, a brilliant inventor. The episode follows Amalia as she tries to find Mary Brighton after getting visions of a fight with Maladie. After the events at the Opera, Lavinia tries to change the public's perception of the Touched by organizing a charitable fete.

The episode received mixed-to-positive reviews, with critics feeling that while the characters and twists were interesting, the pace and writing still feels lacking. The episode was watched by 0.561 million household viewers, which was up from the previous episode.

== Plot ==
Beth Cassini (Domenique Fragale) accidentally exposes her Touched powers by causing objects in her workplace to levitate by touching them. This forces her to flee, abandoning her previous life after seeing a pamphlet for St. Romaulda's Orphanage. On her way to the orphanage, she's kidnapped. Mundi (Ben Chaplin) raids the Orphanage, convinced that Maladie (Amy Manson) is hidden there, but fails to find anything. He then converses with Amalia (Laura Donnelly) and expresses discomfort at knowing that Mary (Eleanor Tomlinson) is a Touched. Lavinia (Olivia Williams) arrives and uses her influence to expel the police from the orphanage. Because the public has developed a negative perception of the Touched after the events of the Opera, Lavinia enlists Penance (Ann Skelly) and select members of the Touched to attend a charitable fete at her estate to change the public's perception.

Lord Massen (Pip Torrens) and the other council members discuss the events at the Opera and how this will impact their political interests. Massen then talks with Hugo (James Norton) and finds out he plans to incorporate more Touched into the staff of his club, where memberships have increased since the events at the Opera. Massen gets angry when Hugo makes a disparaging remark about his own father, a person Massen admired. Amalia has a vision in which she and Maladie fight after having a meeting with Desirée (Ella Smith), a Touched with the power to compel people to express their secrets. She takes Desirée to the police station to see Mundi, where Desirée uses her power to make him reveal that he and Mary were once engaged but Mary left him at the altar. The power reveals that he cares more about finding Mary than catching Maladie. Mary is revealed to be held captive at an old factory where some of Maladie's followers taunt her and mock her abilities.

At the charitable fete, Penance talks with Auggie (Tom Riley) and the two enjoy some time together. Lavinia warns him to leave her, as people would believe she used her powers on him. He stops talking to her, prompting Penance to leave the estate. Realizing Maladie's location, Amalia heads to the old factory, where she finds Penance and Mary, each with a noose around her neck on the edge of a platform. Amalia fights Maladie, during which they call each other "Sarah" and "Molly", revealing they had a past together where Amalia abandoned Maladie. Maladie then forces Amalia to choose either Mary or Penance to save but Amalia instead shoots herself. As Maladie is distracted, Amalia shoots her. Maladie and her followers flee the area as Mundi and more officials arrive at the scene. Amalia is taken to Horatio (Zackary Momoh), who uses his powers to heal her wound. Beth is brought to Dr. Hague (Denis O'Hare), who is about to perform surgery on her before he is interrupted by his assistant, who tells him that their boss has arrived. Hague meets with his employer, Lavinia, at a cave and shows her the progress his team has made since finding a massive blue-colored orb that may explain some of their questions.

== Production ==
=== Development ===
Jane Espenson joined the series, making it her fifth collaboration with Whedon after working on Buffy the Vampire Slayer, Angel, Firefly and Dollhouse. In March 2021, the episode's title was revealed as "Exposure" and it was announced that Espenson had written the episode while Whedon had directed it.

=== Writing ===
Olivia Williams commented on the actions of her character, "As in all folklore, the baddie is evil... Now, in the modern interpretation... we're given psychological insights into why people might be bad. What I find more interesting, actually, is working out why people are good, and particularly this Victorian philanthropy, which was an even bigger thing, dare I say, in America, and continues to be – like the Roosevelts."

== Reception ==
=== Ratings ===
In its original American broadcast, "Exposure" was seen by an estimated 0.561 million household viewers and gained a 0.12 ratings share among adults aged 18–49, according to Nielsen Media Research. This was an improvement over the previous episode.

=== Critical reviews ===
Roxana Hadadi from The A.V. Club gave it a B− and wrote, "I think Jane Espenson's writing here is purposefully opaque, but I'm going to go ahead and guess that putting up fake fliers for the orphanage and using Mrs. True's face to lure desperate people just learning of their turns to Dr. Hague, like lambs for the slaughter, is not particularly benevolent on the part of Lavinia." Amanda Whitting from Vulture gave it a 2 out 5 star rating and wrote, "Victorian England, in which discussion of sex was verboten and women’s bodies were mysterious even to themselves, paradoxically loved a freak show. This week, The Nevers gives us two." Richard Trenholm from CNET wrote, "The big theme of episode 2 is how society exploits those who are different. 'Horror and fascination go arm in arm,' as one character says, and this episode reveals various players at different social strata setting out to manipulate and mistreat the Touched for their own ends."
