= Hanged (The Nevers) =

- The Nevers episode
- Episode no.: Season 1 Episode 5
- Directed by: Joss Whedon
- Written by: Melissa Iqbal
- Cinematography by: Kate Reid
- Editing by: Lisa Lassek
- Original air date: May 9, 2021
- Running time: 59 minutes

Guest appearances
- Domenique Fragale as Beth Cassini; Martyn Ford as Nicolas Perbal; Mark Benton as The Colonel; Sylvie Briggs as Clara; Pui Fan Lee as Su Ping Lim; Lola Dubus as Dominique; Matt Emery as Detective Birch; Brett Curtis as George; Andrew Havill as Douglas Broome; Nicholas Farrell as Prince Albrecht; Tim Steed as Lord Allaven Tyne; Rupert Vansittart as Lord Broughton; Timothy Bentinck as General Pecking; George Dawson as Hague's Assistant; Paul Bentley as Judge; Heather Coombs as Anxious Mother; Sam Lathem as Mean Cop; Benny Ainsworth as Police Clerk; Brett Allen as Tent Cop; Grahame Fox as Crabby Cop; Joe Reisig as Scarred Begger King Guard; Bill Hurst as Male Diner; Amanda Holt as Female Diner; Frances Wilding as Hanging Watcher 1; Simon Balcon as Hanging Watcher 2; Jack Gouldbourne as Hanging Watcher 3; Victoria Howell as Hanging Watcher 4; Paul Hamilton as Hanging Watcher 5

Episode chronology
← Previous "Undertaking"	Next → "True"

"Hanged" is the fifth episode of the American science fiction drama television series The Nevers. The episode was directed by series creator Joss Whedon and written by Melissa Iqbal. It originally aired on HBO on May 9, 2021, and also was available on HBO Max on the same date.

The series is set in Victorian era London and follows a group of people, mostly women, known as the Touched, who suddenly manifest abnormal abilities. Among them are Amalia True, a mysterious and quick-fisted widow, and her best friend Penance Adair, a brilliant inventor. The episode follows Maladie's trial and incoming public execution. The choice of a public execution divides not only government officials, but also the Touched. Amalia intends to find the object that gave them powers while Penance plans to help Maladie escape.

It was the last directing credit from Whedon before the workplace abuse allegations and his departure from the show.

The episode received positive reviews, with critics praising the ending, with many comparing it to The Usual Suspects as well as the character development for Amalia and Penance. The episode was watched by 0.570 million household viewers.

== Plot ==
Maladie (Amy Manson) is put on trial for her crimes and is sentenced to death by hanging, with her execution set to be in public. While Lord Massen (Pip Torrens) is pleased with the idea, his fellow government officials don't agree with the public execution. The glowing orb has started to crack and emitted pulses of light, which worries Lavinia (Olivia Williams), who wants it destroyed. Dr. Hague (Denis O'Hare) refuses, citing that the orb can still be used for their own benefits. Amalia (Laura Donnelly) and Penance (Ann Skelly) are also working on tracking down the "Galanthi" (the aircraft that passed through London and gave them powers), using a map of the city to find possible locations. Penance intents to use a new drill to help them but it malfunctions during a test. Effie visits Mundi (Ben Chaplin), as she wants an interview with Maladie for her paper. After being denied, she runs into Hugo (James Norton), and whispers a request into his ear.

Lord Massen visits the Beggar King (Nick Frost), revealing Massen sent Odium to kill Amalia. Massen tells him to cause chaos after the execution. Penance reveals to Amalia that she intends to rescue Maladie, explaining that despite her history, she can't let another Touched die. Despite disagreeing, Amalia won't stop her but she won't help her either, preferring to look for the Galanthi on the same day as the execution. During the execution, Penance and a few other Touched sneak around the building, planning to intercept Maladie at the podium. However, Maladie actually knocks her guards and pulls the lever, hanging herself in front of everyone. The Colonel (Mark Benton) activates an electrical switch that causes the barrier to electrocute those who are touching it. Penance tries to turn it off but the damage is already done, with people getting killed and frightened of the Touched. Back in the station, Mundi has an epiphany where he remembers the case of a murdered woman and how the corpse of Maladie doesn't match with her description. It's revealed that he never caught Maladie, it was a decoy named Clara Stowe (Sylvie Briggs). In the final scene, Effie removes her costume to reveal she is Maladie in disguise.

== Production ==
=== Development ===
In March 2021, the episode's title was revealed as "Hanged" and it was announced that Melissa Iqbal had written the episode while series creator Joss Whedon had directed it. This was Whedon's third and last directing credit for the show before exiting.

=== Filming ===
The episode revealed that the character of Effie was in fact Maladie disguised. In order to create the illusion of Maladie posing as Effie, Amy Manson used makeup, wore a fat suit and then the look was altered in post-production using Computer-generated imagery. In an attempt to fool the audience, a fake name "Margaret Tuttle" was added to IMDb as the actress playing Effie.

== Reception ==
=== Ratings ===
In its original American broadcast, "Hanged" was seen by an estimated 0.570 million household viewers and gained a 0.09 ratings share among adults aged 18–49, according to Nielsen Media Research. This was up from the previous episode, which was watched by 0.515 million and a 0.07 share in the 18-49 demo.

=== Critical reviews ===
Roxana Hadadi from The A.V. Club gave it a B− and wrote, "As has become custom for The Nevers, though, 'Hanged' is all over the place in terms of varying villains and subplots, restarting certain relationships, hinting at others, and linking together unexpected alliances." Amanda Whitting from Vulture gave it a 4 out 5 star rating and wrote, "Right now, the series is not exactly pick-up-and-play material: The world is appealingly elaborate, but its characters are messy and the plot is octopine. It’s tricky to see how Phillipa Goslett, the British screenwriter and first-time showrunner tapped to replace Whedon, can excavate what's working (Amalia and Penance's repartee, Hugo Swann's cocksure smarm) from what isn't (a longer list). But after watching 'Hanged,' a much tidier episode than we've come to expect, I'm suddenly optimistic again. It's feeling less like we're nearing some arbitrary halfway point and more like the end of a lengthy prologue."
