= Ignition (The Nevers) =

- The Nevers episode
- Episode no.: Season 1 Episode 3
- Directed by: David Semel
- Written by: Kevin Lau
- Cinematography by: Ben Smithard
- Editing by: Cheryl Potter
- Original air date: April 25, 2021
- Running time: 56 minutes

Guest appearances
- Martyn Ford as Nicolas "Odium" Perbal; Mark Benton as The Colonel; Lola Dubus as Dominique; Pui Fan Lee as Su Ping Lim; Matt Emery as Detective Birch; Brett Curtis as George; Alison Pargeter as Kindly Old Woman; Ruth Sheen as Mrs. Beechum; Daniel Tetsell as Phone Line Engineer; Katy Baker as Barmaid; Jack Wheatley as Nigel Blodgett; Louis Ellis as Nervous New Guy; Madeleine Wilson as Lady Whisper; Jordan Long as Guard; Phil Zimmerman as Signalman

Episode chronology
← Previous "Exposure"	Next → "Undertaking"

"Ignition" is the third episode of the American science fiction drama television series The Nevers. The episode was directed by David Semel and written by producer Kevin Lau. It originally aired on HBO on April 25, 2021 and also was available on HBO Max on the same date.

The series is set in Victorian era London and follows a group of people, mostly women, known as the Touched, who suddenly manifest abnormal abilities. Among them are Amalia True, a mysterious and quick-fisted widow, and her best friend Penance Adair, a brilliant inventor. The episode follows Amalia as she begins investigating a fake orphanage that kidnaps Touched people by pretending to be the real orphanage. Meanwhile, Penance begins working on a device that will help every Touched in the city hear Mary's voice.

The episode received generally positive reviews, with critics praising the new character development for the characters and the ending. The episode was watched by 0.448 million household viewers.

== Plot ==
Annie (Rochelle Neil) interrupts a shipment in the docks, which is part of the Beggar King's territory. She is then intercepted by Amalia (Laura Donnelly) and Penance (Ann Skelly), who try to recruit her for the orphanage but she escapes. These events cause the Beggar King (Nick Frost) to lose his temper with his henchmen, telling them to find more about Amalia. The next day, Penance shows her new invention to the women in the orphanage: a device that can amplify Mary's (Eleanor Tomlinson) voice to reach more Touched people. Mary then speaks with Amalia, expressing her concern at the secrets that Amalia may be keeping as well as questioning the purpose of the Touched at the orphanage but Amalia doesn't answer her questions. Meanwhile, Lord Massen (Pip Torrens) has workers install telephones in his property. One of these workers accidentally ventures into the house and finds a room with something trying to escape but is reassured that it's just rabid dogs.

Inspector Mundi (Ben Chaplin) finds a note that tells him to meet with someone at a bar. At the bar, he finds Hugo (James Norton), who openly mocks him and it is revealed that Hugo and Mundi had an intimate encounter before that may have motivated Mary to leave him at the altar, which Mundi blames on alcohol. Doctor Cousens (Zackary Momoh) is led to a carriage, where he finds a wounded Maladie (Amy Manson), who asks him to use his powers to heal her, which he reluctantly agrees to do. Investigating the false flyers that lead to a location posing as the orphanage, Amalia and Lucy (Elizabeth Berrington) visit the fake orphanage to confront the housekeeper. Amalia is attacked by a masked man with a deformed face but she manages to kill him. Amalia then takes several pieces of evidence from the fake orphanage to bring to Lavinia (Olivia Williams) but instead of taking down the flyers, Amalia suggest keeping them so they can watch the fake orphanage.

Lucy takes the captured housekeeper back for interrogation. Meanwhile, Mary invites Inspector Mundi to the orphanage to share her insecurities regarding her power and the orphanage while also seemingly confirms Hugo's deduction regarding their failed marriage. The interrogation of the fake orphanage's housekeeper bolsters Mary's resolve to use her power with Penance's amplifier. She asks for Inspector Mundi and everyone's attendance at the park, despite the fact that Mundi won't be able to hear her voice. On her way to the park, Amalia is thrown out of her carriage to the river next to the bridge. Odium (Martyn Ford), a Beggar King's henchman, is revealed to be a Touched by managing to walk on the water. He tries to kill her but she overpowers him and strangles him with chains to escape. In the park, Mary starts her singing, which manages to be sent to the whole city thanks to Penance's invention. However, she's shot multiple times by one of Maladie's followers. Mundi kills him in revenge but he's wounded in the shoulder. Mary then dies on Amalia's arms. That night, the women at the orphanage find Annie has arrived with several Touched that heard Mary's voice.

== Production ==
=== Development ===
In March 2021, the episode's title was revealed as "Ignition" and it was announced that Kevin Lau had written the episode while David Semel had directed it. This reunited Semel with series creator Joss Whedon, having directed episodes for Buffy the Vampire Slayer and Angel.

=== Filming ===
For the scene in which Amalia fights in the river, Laura Donnelly said that "it was not easy but it was so much fun". The scene required one week of planning at a tank in Pinewood Studios. She mentioned how putting her clothes for the character helped ease the experience and made it more comfortable to shoot it.

== Reception ==
=== Ratings ===
In its original American broadcast, "Ignition" was seen by an estimated 0.448 million household viewers and gained a 0.06 ratings share among adults aged 18–49, according to Nielsen Media Research. This was down from the previous episode, which was watched by 0.561 million and a 0.12 share in the 18-49 demo.

=== Critical reviews ===
Roxana Hadadi from The A.V. Club gave it a B and wrote, "This show is still swimming in exposition dumps, but at least this one was delivered thoughtfully by Donnelly, who manages to elevate every potentially corny element of Mrs. True's character." Amanda Whitting from Vulture gave it a 3 out 5 star rating and wrote, "Telephone lines are being run into private residences, like Lord Massen’s stately home, while elsewhere in London, Penance has invented an amplifier to extend the reach of Mary’s palliative lullaby. Information, often in short supply on The Nevers, is at once more immediate and more diffuse, a disturbing trend for characters who like to keep secrets. But this week, little by little, those secrets start to eke out." Richard Trenholm from CNET wrote, "Episode 3 of The Nevers has only got one thing on its mind. The fantasy series reveals steamy shenanigans and forbidden relationships among the cast of hot-blooded superheroes."
