= Prettejohn =

Prettejohn is an English surname. Notable people with the surname include:

- Elizabeth Prettejohn (born 1961), American art historian and author
- Viola Prettejohn (born 2003), British actress
