= The Nevers =

American science fiction drama television series

- Genre: Drama; Science fiction; Historical fiction; Steampunk
- Created by: Joss Whedon
- Showrunners: Joss Whedon; Philippa Goslett
- Starring: Laura Donnelly; Ann Skelly; Olivia Williams; James Norton; Tom Riley; Pip Torrens; Denis O'Hare; Rochelle Neil; Amy Manson; Zackary Momoh; Eleanor Tomlinson; Nick Frost; Elizabeth Berrington; Viola Prettejohn; Anna Devlin; Kiran Sonia Sawar; Ben Chaplin; Ella Smith; Vinnie Heaven
- Composer: Mark Isham
- Country of origin: United States
- Original language: English
- No. of seasons: 1
- No. of episodes: 12

Production
- Executive producers: Joss Whedon; Bernadette Caulfield; Jane Espenson; Douglas Petrie; Ilene S. Landress; Philippa Goslett; Andrew Bernstein; Daniel S. Kaminsky; Peter Calloway
- Production location: London
- Running time: 54–64 minutes
- Production companies: Mutant Enemy Productions; Oak Ash and Thorn; HBO Entertainment

Original release
- Network: HBO
- Release: April 11 – May 16, 2021
- Network: Tubi
- Release: February 14 – February 15, 2023

The Nevers is an American science fiction drama television series created by Joss Whedon for HBO. The series is produced by HBO and Mutant Enemy Productions, with executive producers including Whedon, Philippa Goslett, Doug Petrie, Jane Espenson, Ilene S. Landress, and Bernadette Caulfield. The series premiered on April 11, 2021. The first season consists of 12 episodes, split into two six-episode parts. In December 2022, the series was canceled before the back six could air and pulled from the HBO Max library on December 18, 2022. All 12 episodes began streaming on Tubi on February 13, 2023.

The series is set in Victorian London and follows a group of people, mostly women, known as the Touched, who suddenly manifest abnormal abilities. Among them are Amalia True, a mysterious and quick-fisted widow, and her best friend Penance Adair, a brilliant inventor. The series received a straight-to-series order from HBO in June 2018, after a bidding war with other networks and streaming services including Netflix. Laura Donnelly was the first actress to join the series in April 2019, with the rest of the cast joining in July 2019.

== Premise ==
The Nevers is described as "an epic science fiction drama about a gang of Victorian[s] who find themselves with unusual abilities (due to alien intervention), relentless enemies, and a mission that might change the world."

== Cast ==
=== Main ===
- Laura Donnelly as Zephyr Alexis Navine / Amalia True: One of The Touched, with the ability to see glimpses of the future. The most irresponsible, spontaneous, and psychologically broken hero of 19th-century London, and a danger to the British elite. She is dedicated to her cause and never turns down a drink.
  - Claudia Black portrays Zephyr in a previous body.
- Ann Skelly as Penance Adair: Amalia's best friend, and a Touched with the power of 'seeing' electrical energy patterns and a skill for inventing. She is both religious and heretically progressive.
- Olivia Williams as Lavinia Bidlow: A rich supporter of the Touched, and patron of the Orphanage where many of the main characters live.
- James Norton as Hugo Swann: An aristocratic pansexual young man who owns a private club and specializes in extortion
- Tom Riley as Augustus "Augie" Bidlow: A kind gentleman bird watcher, Lavinia's brother and secretly one of the Touched.
- Pip Torrens as Lord Gilbert Massen: A former military man and strong supporter of the British Empire, and very skeptical regarding people with extraordinary powers.
- Denis O'Hare as Dr. Edmund Hague: A brutal American surgeon who is experimenting on the Touched.
- Rochelle Neil as Annie Carbey, aka Bonfire Annie: A criminal with the ability to generate balls of flame.
- Amy Manson as Maladie / Sarah: An unstable member of the Touched living underground. Originally known as Sarah, Maladie is not only in charge of a band of renegades but also on a killing spree. Maladie also disguises herself as Effie Boyle, a deceased journalist. Manson is credited with the pseudonym Margaret Tuttle when Effie appears.
- Zackary Momoh as Doctor Horatio Cousens: A West Indian physician. Amalia was there when he discovered his own power to heal. He collaborates with her, and the Beggar King.
- Eleanor Tomlinson as Mary Brighton: A failed singer who has a big surprise ahead of her.
- Nick Frost as Declan Orrun, aka The Beggar King: Charismatic and brutal, Declan is in command of London's low-level criminals. Sometimes he works with Amalia and her cause – and sometimes he is just as happy to sell them out.
- Elizabeth Berrington as Lucy Best: A former thief from an extremely poor upbringing who can shatter whatever she touches.
- Viola Prettejohn as Myrtle Haplisch: An omniglot who can understand any spoken language although her own words come out in randomly shifting languages that she cannot control.
- Anna Devlin as Primrose Chattoway: A sixteen-year-old girl who is ten feet tall.
- Kiran Sonia Sawar as Harriet Kaur: A Scottish Sikh who lives at the orphanage; her breath turns things into glass. She dreams of being a lawyer.
- Ben Chaplin as Inspector Frank Mundi: A large and gruff policeman with a strong sense of morals. He has a reputation for violence and heavy drinking.
- Ella Smith as Desirée Blodgett: A prostitute who causes others around her to pour out secrets when they are feeling strong emotions.
- Vinnie Heaven as Nimble Jack: A young thief and member of the Touched who is notorious for breaking and entering and is capable of creating floating disks that can be used as shields or as stepping stones for accessing high places.

=== Recurring ===
- Martyn Ford as Nicholas Parbel “Odium”: A henchman of the Beggar King and a Touched whose body repels water.
- Pui Fan Lee as Su Ping Lam: the protector of the Orphanage, Touched with incredible strength.
- Brett Curtis as George: one of the protectors of the Orphanage, Touched with sharp thorns.
- Mark Benton as The Colonel: a follower of Maladie and a Touched with a power of persuasion
- David Garrick as Winemar Kroos: a follower of Maladie and a Touched who generates bullets from his right arm
- Rupert Vansittart as Lord Broughton: a member of Massen's Council.
- Andrew Havill as Douglas Broome: a member of Massen's Council.
- Timothy Bentinck as General Pecking: a member of Massen's Council.
- Nicholas Farrell as Prince Albrecht: a member of Massen's Council.
- Tim Steed as Lord Allaven Tyne: a member of Massen's Council.
- Domenique Fragale as Elisabetta "Beth" Cassini: an Italian immigrant and Touched whose turn allows her to make objects levitate.

== Episodes ==
No.	Title	Directed by	Written by	Original release date	U.S. viewers (millions)
Part 1
1	"Pilot"	Joss Whedon	Joss Whedon	April 11, 2021	0.548
In London 1899, the widow Amalia True runs St. Romaulda's Orphanage, a sanctuary for people with extraordinary powers known as the Touched. Amalia and Penance Adair rescue Myrtle Haplisch, a Touched girl who speaks in fragments of different languages, from a band of strange thugs. Meanwhile, Lord Massen and other government officials discuss the Touched and their impact on the empire. Augie Bidlow visits his friend, Hugo Swann, and requests his company at the opera. At the orphanage, Amalia receives an invitation to the opera from Lavinia Bidlow, their patron. On their way to the opera, Amalia and Penance are intercepted by the Beggar King, who is upset about Amalia's demand to meet him. At the opera, serial killer Maladie attacks and takes hostage Mary Brighton, a Touched whose singing soothes the Touched. Amalia pursues them but fails to rescue Mary. Afterward, Inspector Frank Mundi investigates the attack. Elsewhere, Doctor Hague is seen medically tormenting a Touched. A flashback to 1896 reveals Maladie is the only one who remembers a massive flying object that caused the Touched to exist.
2	"Exposure"	Joss Whedon	Jane Espenson	April 18, 2021	0.561
Beth Cassini accidentally reveals her power in public and flees to the orphanage for safety. Mundi leads a raid on the orphanage but fails to find any evidence of Maladie's location. Lavinia arrives to stop him, then invites several Touched to a social event at her estate. Massen warns Swann about his private club and its employment of several Touched. At the orphanage, Amalia admits Desirée Blodgett, a Touched woman who compels people to reveal their secrets, and uses her to get Mundi to reveal that Mary left him at the altar. At Lavinia's party, Augie reveals his turn to Penance. Amalia discovers Maladie's location and goes alone. On her way to the orphanage, Penance is captured by Maladie's men. Amalia fights Maladie, and it is revealed that they were friends. Scotland Yard raids the factory and rescues Penance and Mary, but Maladie manages to escape while Amalia is heavily wounded. A West Indian physician, Horatio Cousens, heals Amalia while Mary reconnects with Mundi. Beth arrives at a false address and is immediately taken to Hague's lab, where Lavinia also arrives and is greeted by a glowing orb.
3	"Ignition"	David Semel	Kevin Lau	April 25, 2021	0.448
Amalia and Penance attempt to recruit Annie Carbey, but fail. At the orphanage, Mary is still hesitant about using her power when Penance reveals her plan to amplify Mary’s voice so all the Touched across London can hear. Mundi meets with Swann at a pub, revealing they organized the raid on the orphanage. Elsewhere, Kroos, one of Maladie's men, is released from prison while Horatio is forced to heal Maladie's wound. Penance and Myrtle discover another orphanage claiming to be theirs, so Amalia and Lucy investigate. They find evidence of Hague's work, prompting Amalia to collect some to bring to Lavinia while Lucy returns with the captive housekeeper. The interrogation of the housekeeper motivates Mary to use her power. Leaving Lavinia's estate, Amalia is attacked by Odium but escapes, killing Odium. At the park, Mary sings her song, but Kroos kills her midway, and Mundi kills him. Returning to the orphanage, Amalia and the others find Annie waiting with several Touched who heard Mary's song.
4	"Undertaking"	David Semel	Madhuri Shekar	May 2, 2021	0.515
Everyone but Amalia attends Mary's funeral. Later, Penance confronts Amalia about being absent, but Amalia vents her frustration instead. Myrtle reveals to Primrose that she understood Mary's song, so Primrose and Harriet work with multilingual Touched to translate. Mundi finds evidence that Swann was involved in Mary's murder, so he violently confronts him in public but finds nothing. While Penance interrogates Augie, Amalia visits Massen, who essentially confesses. Lucy suggests destroying one of Massen's ammo warehouses. She, Amalia, and Annie break in. Amalia confronts Lucy, accusing her of being loyal to Massen, which led to Mary's death. Lucy defends herself, insulting Amalia. The two fight, and Amalia ultimately only banishes Lucy from London. Back at the orphanage, Harriet shares the meaning of the song. It is a direct message to Amalia, and brings her to tears.
5	"Hanged"	Joss Whedon	Melissa Iqbal	May 9, 2021	0.570
Maladie is sentenced to a public hanging, which outrages the Touched. Despite this, Amalia's goal is finding the Galanthi, which is currently underground and under the care of Hague and Lavinia, who notice it begin cracking but are not too worried. Amalia is held back by a malfunction in Penance's drill. The Council is divided on the execution but does nothing to stop it. Effie continues to annoy Mundi while Massen discusses the Touched with the Beggar King. Penance decides she wants to save Maladie but fails, partially because Maladie hangs herself. Penance and Mundi realize too late that Maladie arranged her own execution to lure as many spectators as possible, resulting in many civilian casualties when Maladie's followers spring her trap. In the streets of London, the Beggar King carries out what he and Massen discussed earlier, having his minions sow chaos and disorder among the rest of the population. Penance returns to the orphanage to find Amalia was about as unsuccessful as she was. Mundi realizes the woman who hanged herself was actually one of Maladie's followers and that Effie was Maladie herself. Out in the rioting streets, Maladie sheds her disguise and revels amid the chaos.
6	"True"	Zetna Fuentes	Jane Espenson	May 16, 2021	0.552
Sometime in the future, soldiers from the Planetary Defense Coalition (PDC) are tasked with defending the last Galanthi on Earth. The Galanthi are an alien race that arrived in the not too distant past to provide humanity with technology capable of restoring a ravaged Earth. During a fight with the FreeLife Army (another human faction), the last Galanthi starts to leave Earth, and many PDC soldiers die. Losing hope for Earth's survival, a soldier, Zephyr, commits suicide. While leaving through a portal, the Galanthi takes her soul. In 1890s London, Amalia, known as Molly, works for a bakery and marries Thomas True, but drowns herself just as the Galanthi fly overhead. Awakening in an asylum, Zephyr finds herself in Molly's body and assumes her identity. As Amalia, she befriends Maladie (then known as Sarah) but betrays her to Hague in order to avoid compromising herself. Along with Horatio, she begins collecting information on the Touched and is eventually approached by Lavinia to run the orphanage. In the present day, Amalia returns to the orphanage, as unsuccessful as Penance was. After revealing her true name to Penance, she decides to tell the orphanage.
Part 2
7	"It's a Good Day"	Andrew Bernstein	Philippa Goslett	February 14, 2023	N/A
In 1896, the day the Galanthi appears in London, Dr. Hague tries and fails to convince people that he hears his mother's voice in static. Because of this, he is expelled from the medical community. A day after the hanging, Amalia's visions of the future are incrementing and earthquakes are becoming a common thing in London. Mundi tries to convince the police that Maladie is alive, but his superintendent tells him to drop the case. Penance convinces Amalia to tell the people in the orphanage that she is actually a soldier from the future. Mundi discovers a group of people who dress like Maladie and see her as messianic figure. Myrtle is attacked by a Purist girl named Nancy. Myrtle kills her in self defense. At Hague's home, his robot dog attacks Penance and Amalia, who set the place on fire in the ensuing fight. When Hague arrives there, the women are gone, and the phone rings. He picks it up and hears singing. When he turns around, he sees Maladie sitting on the window.
8	"I Don't Know Enough About You"	Jennifer Getzinger	Ira Parker	February 14, 2023	N/A
A vengeful Maladie has Dr. Hague dig a hole in the ground while psychologically torturing him. By negotiating with the Beggar King, Massen inflates anti-Touched violence in London. Among the places attacked is the house of Horatio, who is forced to move with his family to the Orphanage. There, he confides in Amalia that he loves both her and his wife. Using Nancy's death as an excuse, Lavinia has armed guards surround the Orphanage and forbids everyone within to leave. While explaining this to Amalia, she realizes Lucy's turn might be capable of destroying the Galanthi (and with it, in theory, the "plague" of the Touched). In prison, Lavinia convinces Lucy of helping her by saying that destroying the creature will "cure" her of her deadly turn. Lucy escapes from prison and goes to Lavinia's mines. There, she uses her turn to break the Galanthi's shell. As a result, the tremors increase and parts of London start collapsing. Amalia and Penance run to aid the creature. Meanwhile, a little Galanthi falls down from the broken shell. Lucy picks it up while Lavinia orders her to kill it and the cave collapses.
9	"Fever"	Jennifer Getzinger	Rammy Park	February 14, 2023	N/A
As kids, Augie shows Lavinia the shed where he studies bird anatomy. Disturbed by his "abnormal" behavior, Lavinia forces him to burn the shed down. Enraged, a traumatized Augie pushes Lavinia, who is accidentally left paralyzed by this attack. After the cave's collapse, Augie helps Lavinia get to safety, where she reveals she knows he is Touched. Shocked by Lavinia's anti-Touched sentiments, Augie leaves her lying on the ground in a rail tunnel, her wheelchair damaged in the cave in and blocked from leaving by a steam engine. Meanwhile, Amalia and Penance find a dying Lucy, who reveals the Galanthi is alive and roaming through the cave. After his father dies, Swann becomes a duke. Maladie uses the hole that Hague started to dig to get into London's sewers, where she confronts Amalia and Penance. Maladie reveals she has been hearing the Galanthi's voice in her head ever since it arrived in London and can easily find it. Realizing that Amalia plans to return to the future after finding the Galanthi, Penance says goodbye to her and stays behind while the two other women go after the creature. Their chase ends under the Thames, where they meet the Galanthi.
10	"Alright, Okay, You Win"	Nina Lopez-Corrado	Harrison David Rivers	February 15, 2023	N/A
Having forgotten her Maladie personality, Sarah emerges from the Thames and visits her abusive husband. She discovers he was the one who institutionalized her and kills him after he begins abusing her again. Unbeknownst to Augie, Lavinia crawls her way out of the sewers and is taken to their mansion. At the Orphanage, Horatio discovers his son is Touched and can see other people's dreams. He sees the dreams of a "puppet-man" who plans on attacking the building. Horatio follows a nearby puppeteer and witnesses a meeting between the Purists and the Beggar King. Hague receives a call and hears his mother telling him to go to Lavinia's, where a fundraiser lunch for the Orphanage is to take place. Augie invites Penance to the event, aiming to take control of every Bidlow possession (including the Orphanage) and come out publicly as a Touched there. Hague interrupts Augie before he can do so and convinces Penance to leave with him, promising to reveal what is happening with the telephone lines. Lavinia later has her brother committed to an asylum. Disappointed with her life in the Orphanage, Myrtle joins Maladie's cult. While investigating, Swann and Mundi discover Massen's Touched daughter.
11	"Ain't We Got Fun"	Nina Lopez-Corrado	Alyssa Thorne & Adam Meggido	February 15, 2023	N/A
Augie escapes the carriage taking him to the asylum by killing the chauffeurs with his power. Mundi and Swann bring Massen's daughter to the Orphanage. Horatio severely scars the Beggar King and destroys his cargo of Massen-produced weapons. Aided by Swann and his new title, Harriet reaches London's oligarchy and convinces them to not decreet a law against the Touched. At Hague's laboratory, Penance discovers that his "mother" is actually another time-traveller who arrived with the Galanthi but without a body. She is made of energy and manipulated Hague into capturing the unconscious bodies of Amalia and the Galanthi to kill one and use it as a vessel. While knocked out, Amalia speaks with both the dead Molly and a previous version of her own self, who still blames herself for not saving her loved ones in the future. Amalia keeps fighting with her selves until she remembers how important Penance is to her. This turns out to be a test by the Galanthi, which wants to teach Amalia without using words. Amalia wakes up, and with the aid of Penance, dispatches Hague's robotic henchman, the doctor himself, and the other time-traveller. Lavinia and her forces later arrive.
12	"I'll Be Seeing You"	Andrew Bernstein	Peter Calloway	February 15, 2023	N/A
Amalia has a vision of Penance dying in a wrecked Orphanage. She wakes up tied up with Penance while Lavinia shoots at the Galanthi. Its pain is sensed by all the Touched, who lose their powers as the Purists attack the Orphanage. Hearing the Galanthi's cries, Maladie leads her followers into subduing Lavinia's forces. Lavinia escapes but is then killed by Augie. While the cult stays with the dying creature, Amalia, Penance and Myrtle go to the Orphanage. Amalia stops Penance from entering the Orphanage's main building and seemingly dies fighting the Purists. Massen shows up looking for his daughter but is stopped by Mundi and Swann. Massen kills Swann and gets killed by Mundi. Before dying, the Galanthi gives the Touched back their powers and dissolves into "seeds" which will give more people around the world superpowers. The Touched defeat the Purists and Amalia survives after having another conversation with the Galanthi, which wanted to teach her the value of sacrificing for others. While Amalia's hope for the future is renewed, Penance's is shattered as the creature died "colonizing" the world and making it more complicated. Meanwhile, Myrtle returns to Maladie and gets possessed by the time-traveller.

== Production ==
An official poster for the series

=== Development ===
On July 13, 2018, it was announced that HBO had given the production a straight-to-series order. Joss Whedon would serve as a writer, director, executive producer, and showrunner for the series. The series landed at HBO after a bidding war with other networks and streaming services including Netflix. Whedon explained the title at Comic-Con 2018:

They, themselves are not called that [The Nevers] in the show. It's a phrase that's meant to evoke a sort of reaction to their oddity, to what is considered unnatural. The idea that you should never be like this, you should never have existed. Something is not the way it should be, and you don't have the right to have whatever weird power or ability that you have. And that idea, that some people are not of the natural order, is fascinating to me. I don't agree with it. But to me, it's one of those things where you take something negative, and you wear it as a badge of honor, basically. Certain things could never happen - they're happening. And the people they're happening to are taking their place in the world.

=== Cast and crew ===
In April 2019, Laura Donnelly was cast in the starring role of Amalia True. Whedon said about her, "Laura Donnelly has charisma, wisdom and an anarchic precision that not only captures Amalia but defines her. She's fierce and she's funny – and I need both for the journey ahead." In July 2019, twelve actors were added to the cast, including Ann Skelly as Penance Adair, Olivia Williams as Lavinia Bidlow, James Norton as Hugo Swann, Tom Riley as Augustus "Augie" Bidlow, Pip Torrens as Lord Massen, Denis O'Hare as Dr. Edmund Hague, Rochelle Neil as Annie Carbey, Amy Manson as Maladie, Zackary Momoh as Doctor Horatio Cousens, Eleanor Tomlinson as Mary Brighton, Nick Frost as Declan Orrun, and Ben Chaplin as Inspector Frank Mundi. One month later, Elizabeth Berrington, Viola Prettejohn, Anna Devlin, Kiran Sonia Sawar, and Ella Smith were all cast in main roles Lucy Best, Myrtle Haplisch, Primrose Chattaway, Harriet Kaur, and Desirée Blodgett. Also in August, Martyn Ford was cast in the recurring role of Nicolas Perbal, also known as Odium.

In the fifth episode, the character Effie Boyle is introduced. Effie is revealed to be one of Maladie's victims, with the Effie seen in the episode being Maladie herself in disguise. In order to create the illusion of Maladie posing as Effie, Amy Manson wore makeup and a fat suit, with the look altered in postproduction using computer-generated imagery. In an attempt to fool the audience, a fake name "Margaret Tuttle" was added to IMDb as the actress playing Effie.

Executive producers include Bernadette Caulfield, Jane Espenson, and Doug Petrie. Espenson and Petrie, who worked with Whedon on Buffy the Vampire Slayer, served as writers. Laurie Penny is also part of the series' writing staff. Gemma Jackson serves as production designer. Academy Award winner Christine Blundell served as the hair and makeup designer. She said that inspiration came from modern-day punk in order to help with the visual world of the series. In June 2021, HBO announced that Andrew Bernstein had joined the series as an executive producer and director.

=== Filming ===
On July 4, 2019, Whedon announced that principal photography had started, with filming occurring in London. In July 2019, it was reported that scenes had been filmed at Trinity Church Square, and in the New Wimbledon Theatre area. In August 2019, scenes were filmed at Chatham Historic Dockyard in Kent. In late January 2020, shooting took place at Joyce Grove, an Oxfordshire country house estate in the Jacobean style. The building will double as The Orphanage. Due to the lack of available studio space in London, HBO worked with Adrian Wootton, CEO of Film London and the British Film Commission, to find warehouse spaces and old industrial spaces in which they could base the production.

The series completed production on the first five of its ten-episode order before production was shut down due to the COVID-19 pandemic. Filming resumed in September and production was completed by the end of October. In February 2021, Bloys confirmed that the first season would consist of 10 episodes that would be broken into two airing blocks, due to the production shutdown caused by the COVID-19 pandemic. The season's episode count was then extended to 12 episodes.

Production on the final six episodes of the first season began in June 2021 in the UK with filming completed by December 2021.

=== Writing ===
Speaking to the break in the release schedule between episodes six and seven due to production issues, HBO and HBO Max chief content officer Casey Bloys stated, "And there was kind of a natural narrative break at six. So that was the thought then was to air six episodes. So at least we had something to put out there for subscribers and fans." Bloys also said that Goslett and her team of writers are working through the second batch of scripts now and "we'll get a better sense of timing" when those will air as "the weeks go on." In March 2021, it was clarified that the first season was extended from 10 to 12 episodes, with the second part of the first season also consisting of 6 episodes. Vanessa Armstrong of Syfy.com wrote that star Laura Donnelly thought the script for the series' sixth episode was "so bonkers" that she "initially thought that they got sent the wrong script."

=== Whedon's departure ===
On November 25, 2020, Whedon announced that he was stepping down from the series citing various reasons for his decision in "this year of unprecedented challenges." In a released statement, he explained that the taxing nature of working on such a project during the coronavirus pandemic had taken a toll on his energy levels and confirmed rumors that he would be officially exiting the series. On January 28, 2021, British screenwriter Philippa Goslett was announced as the new showrunner. In response to the accusations of workplace harassment against Whedon on his prior projects, Bloys stated, "We had no complaints or no reports of inappropriate behavior" regarding his work on The Nevers. Nevertheless, Whedon's involvement was not acknowledged in the marketing of the series, although he was still properly credited for his work. Afterwards, series regular Denis O'Hare, who portrays Doctor Edmund Hague, noted that he was unaware of the misconduct allegations aimed at Whedon at the time and said that the whole cast was worried about the continued filming of the first season. O'Hare did praise Goslett, calling the new showrunner "the exact right choice" and saying, "I think there's some writing staff that's remaining the same. Whenever they're changing a writer, let alone a showrunner, you don't know what's going to happen to your character."

=== Cancellation ===
On December 12, 2022, HBO canceled the series after one season and announced it would be pulled from the HBO Max library. It was also reported that the series, including the remaining six unaired episodes, may stream on another platform. Deadline reported that the storyline was "crafted in a way that it concludes with Season 1B". In January 2023, it was confirmed that all 12 episodes would be available on Warner Bros. Discovery's FAST channel on Tubi beginning that year, later specified to be February 13 for episodes 1–5, February 14 for episodes 6–9, and February 15 for episodes 10–12.

== Broadcast ==
The Nevers premiered on April 11, 2021, on HBO and HBO Max, and was set to consist of 12 episodes, split into two 6-episode parts. The series' official trailer was released on March 23, 2021. The second part of the first season premiered on February 14–15, 2023, on Tubi. In the UK, all 12 episodes began streaming on ITVX in February 2026.

=== Home media ===
The first season, part one, was released on October 5, 2021, on Blu-ray and DVD.

== Reception ==
=== Critical response ===
On Rotten Tomatoes, the series has an approval rating of 47% based on reviews from 68 critics. The website's critics consensus reads, "Despite strong performances and stellar production design, The Nevers struggles to stitch its slew of intriguing components into a solid show." On Metacritic, the series has a score of 57 out of 100 based on 28 reviews, indicating "mixed or average reviews". Ed Cumming of The Independent gave the series three stars out of five, calling it an "overstuffed junk shop of ideas" and disliked that too many "themes of alienation and acceptance unfold amid horse-drawn chases, expensive special effects, high-society orgies, corset brawls, and wainscoting aplenty." BBC Online's Scott Bryan called it "just a bit too weighted down." Wenlei Ma of News.com.au said The Nevers is "a distillation of Whedon's best and worst filmmaking impulses. It needs someone with a more disciplined eye to cut half of its many dangling threads and subplots."

In a positive review by Lorraine Ali from the Los Angeles Times, she wrote, "The Nevers is a joy to watch and a thrill to follow. Supernatural realism, complex storytelling, fantastical powers and topical realties meet in this smart, suspenseful and colorful production. A litany of nuanced characters keeps this otherworldly tale grounded. Suspenseful sleuthing and action-packed battles move the story along at a rapid clip. And all the lush scenery and ambitious wardrobe along the way". Daniel Fienberg of The Hollywood Reporter gave it a more mixed review, writing that the series is "in desperate need of focus, and as episodes progress, more and more characters are added and the connection to the richest thematic throughline becomes increasingly tenuous". However, Fienberg praised Whedon's directing, as well as the production design and costumes.

Ben Travers of IndieWire criticized the series, saying "The Nevers' inconsistencies can make for a maddening viewing experience — sending you from the edge of your seat to sprawled out on the floor, trying to find your eyes after they rolled out of your head — and far too many parts make zero sense whatsoever." However, Travers went on to say that he would continue watching it and that even though Joss Whedon left the show during production, he had left his mark on it. A three-star review on The Guardian called the series a "mess, within and without" and compared it to Enola Holmes and Penny Dreadful. Darren Franich of Entertainment thought "True" made the series much more interesting, saying "the sixth episode of The Nevers is the troubled HBO drama's best hour yet", but also noted that this development in the plot may have come too late.

On the transition to Tubi, the new livestreaming format was criticized. Leah Marilla Thomas of The Mary Sue called it "a bad way of distributing television" as appointment viewing is not normally "in the middle of the work day in the middle of the work/school week". Adi Tantimedh of Bleeding Cool stated that outlets are not covering "the unseen episodes" as "no one is actually seeing them" given the afternoon timeslot for viewing – "the next opportunity to watch them is in March… and once again, only live". Tasha Robinson, for Polygon, commented that the "limitation on finally seeing the back half of The Nevers has led to fans of the show trying to find workarounds [...]. It also means even the biggest fans are likely to watch the episodes asynchronously over time, at least until they can reliably pirate them. It's just the latest depressing blow for a series that deserved better, and never really had a chance to thrive".

=== Ratings ===
Viewership and ratings per episode of The Nevers
No.	Title	Air date	Rating (18–49)	Viewers (millions)	DVR (18–49)	DVR viewers (millions)	Total (18–49)	Total viewers (millions)
1	"Pilot"	April 11, 2021	0.10	0.548	0.07	0.365	0.17	0.913
2	"Exposure"	April 18, 2021	0.12	0.561	0.08	0.528	0.20	1.089
3	"Ignition"	April 25, 2021	0.06	0.448	0.11	0.535	0.17	0.983
4	"Undertaking"	May 2, 2021	0.07	0.515	0.11	0.512	0.18	1.027
5	"Hanged"	May 9, 2021	0.09	0.570	0.10	0.473	0.19	1.043
6	"True"	May 16, 2021	0.08	0.552	0.11	0.558	0.19	1.110

=== Accolades ===
Award	Date of ceremony	Category	Recipient(s)	Result	Ref(s)
Visual Effects Society Awards	2022	Outstanding Visual Effects in a Photoreal Episode	Johnny Han, Jack Geist, Justin Mitchell, Emanuel Fuchs, Michael Dawson (for "Ignition")	Nominated	
Visual Effects Society Awards	2022	Outstanding Effects Simulations in an Episode, Commercial, or Real-Time Project	David Stopford, Michele Stocco, Mike Hsu, Justin Mitchell	Nominated	
Visual Effects Society Awards	2024	Outstanding Animated Character in an Episode or Real-Time Project	Christian Leitner, Bernd Nalbach, Sebastian Plank, Martin Wellstein (for " It's a Good Day"; Robot Dog)	Nominated	
