= Brides (upcoming film) =

- Directed by: Chloe Okuno
- Written by: Chloe Okuno
- Produced by: Anthony Bregman; Stefanie Azpiazu; Greg Zuk
- Starring: Olivia Cooke; Harry Lawtey; Jodie Turner-Smith; Viola Prettejohn; Burn Gorman
- Production company: Likely Story
- Distributed by: Neon
- Country: United States
- Language: English

Brides is an upcoming American gothic horror film written and directed by Chloe Okuno and starring Olivia Cooke.

== Cast ==
- Olivia Cooke as Sally Bishop
- Harry Lawtey as Vova
- Jodie Turner-Smith
- Viola Prettejohn
- Burn Gorman

== Production ==
Brides was announced as a film that was going up for sale at the 2024 American Film Market from writer/director Chloe Okuno and starring Maika Monroe. It is produced by Anthony Bregman and Stefanie Azpiazu at Likely Story. At the time, it was in pre-production and the production planned to begin in early 2025. In December 2024, Neon acquired North American distribution rights to the film, with principal photography initially set to commence in March 2025.

In May 2025 it was revealed that Monroe had exited the film last minute, opting to make Reminders of Him instead, resulting in a production delay and Olivia Cooke replacing her. On October 23, 2025, Harry Lawtey, Jodie Turner-Smith, Viola Prettejohn and Burn Gorman were announced to have joined the cast, with production having commenced in Budapest and Focus Features acquiring international rights. Additional filming in Hungary took place outside Budapest when the city center of Székesfehérvár underwent location dressing to represent 1960s Italy.
