= Outcasts (TV series) =

British Science-Fiction television series

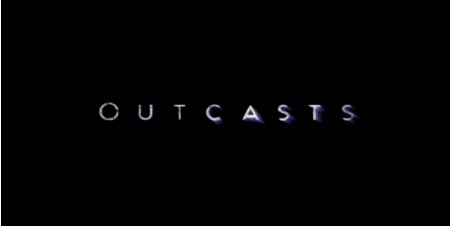
- Genre: Drama; Science fiction
- Created by: Ben Richards
- Directed by: Bharat Nalluri; Omar Madha; Andy Goddard; Jamie Payne
- Starring: Liam Cunningham; Hermione Norris; Amy Manson; Daniel Mays; Ashley Walters; Michael Legge; Langley Kirkwood; Jeanne Kietzmann; Eric Mabius
- Composer: Paul Englishby
- Country of origin: United Kingdom
- No. of series: 1
- No. of episodes: 8

Production
- Executive producers: Ben Richards; Jane Featherstone; Simon Crawford-Collins; Faith Penhale; Matthew Read
- Producer: Radford Neville
- Running time: Approx. 50 minutes
- Production company: Kudos Film & Television

Original release
- Network: BBC One
- Release: 7 February – 13 March 2011

Outcasts is a 2011 British television eight-part science-fiction drama serial, starring Liam Cunningham, Hermione Norris, Amy Manson, Daniel Mays, Eric Mabius and Ashley Walters. It originally aired on BBC One, and BBC HD. It was broadcast in the United States on BBC America.

== Plot ==
Outcasts is set in the year 2060 on the fictional planet Carpathia, a habitable planet five years travel from Earth. Carpathia has been colonized by a succession of spaceships fleeing destruction and nuclear conflict back on Earth. Most of the planet's population is living within the limits of the pioneer town Forthaven, that was settled ten years before the time of the beginning of the series.

The Carpathians live in ignorance of Earth's fate, receiving news only through the few evacuee ships that manage the difficult atmospheric entry onto Carpathia. The planet was named by the colonists in honour of the RMS Carpathia, a ship that came to rescue survivors of the RMS Titanic disaster.

The story focuses on the President of Carpathia, Richard Tate and the Protection and Security (PAS) team, as well as Expeditionaries (XPs), whose role is to explore the planet on foot and retrieve resources and medicines. With the arrival of CT-9, perhaps the last transporter that will reach Carpathia from Earth, the story follows the lives of the settlers, the induction of new evacuees into the Forthaven community and the effect of others living outside the walls of Forthaven.

== Science fiction elements ==
While much of the series deals with human relationships in a hostile environment, there are a number of sci-fi elements – such as being set in the future, on a planet in a faraway solar system, after some sort of global catastrophe.

The Advanced Cultivars (ACs) are a group of genetically enhanced humans designed to survive in harsh conditions. Early in the colonisation, they were wrongly accused of being the carriers/source of a plague which killed many of the new colony's children, including those of President Tate. Some of the ACs have specific problems due to their conditioning. They are supposedly sterile.

Though the planet has only simple native animals and birds, over the course of the series the colony discovers evidence of both an extinct native hominid species and a mysterious alien intelligence capable of manifesting physical entities based on the colonists.

The Deep Brain Visualization (DBV) machine translates brain activity into visual images on a screen showing what the person remembers. The person sits in a reclining chair with their head between two blocks containing sensors to non-invasively collect the data.

== Cast ==
- Liam Cunningham as President Richard Tate
- Hermione Norris as Dr Stella Isen, Head of Protection and Security (PAS)
- Daniel Mays as PAS Officer Cass Cromwell
- Amy Manson as PAS Officer Fleur Morgan
- Ashley Walters as Expeditionary Jack Holt
- Michael Legge as Tipper Malone, an anti-authoritarian black marketeer
- Eric Mabius as Julius Berger, former Vice President of the Earth Evacuation Programme
- Laura Greenwood as Aisling
- Langley Kirkwood as Rudi
- Imdad Miah as Santi
- Patrick Lyster as Captain Kellermann, commander of CT-9 (Colony Transporter 9)
- Jeanne Kietzmann as Lily Isen, Stella's daughter
- Jamie Bamber as Mitchell Hoban, Head of the Expeditionaries (XPs) His Psych profile gives his date of birth (12/03/2023) and indicates that he may suffer from multiple personality disorder.
- Juliet Aubrey as Josie Hunter

== Production ==
In development since 2007, produced by Kudos Film & Television for BBC One, the series started shooting in South Africa in May 2010, coinciding with the 2010 FIFA World Cup being held there. According to David Stephenson, writing in the Daily Express, the original scripts underwent 25 rewrites.

== Episodes ==
No.	Title	Directed by	Written by	Original release date	UK viewers (millions)	Share (%)
1	"Episode 1"	Bharat Nalluri	Ben Richards	7 February 2011	4.50	17.9
CT-9, a transport ship, is about to arrive to Carpathia, but its re-entry heat shield is compromised. Meanwhile, Mitchell Hoban, head of the Expeditionaries, displays increasingly erratic behaviour.
2	"Episode 2"	Bharat Nalluri	Ben Richards	8 February 2011	3.30	13.0
The escape pods have landed. Julius Berger seems to have saved his life at a high price. The ACs have taken a girl hostage and want the colonists to cure a baby as a price for her life and freedom.
3	"Episode 3"	Omar Madha	Ben Richards and Simon Block	14 February 2011	2.95	11.8
While a huge whiteout (a ferocious dust storm caused by Carpathia's twin moons) is threatening Forthaven, two technicians are sent to secure the Earth beacon, and Cass leaves on a rescue mission that no one believes he will survive.
4	"Episode 4"	Omar Madha	Jack Lothian	15 February 2011	2.63	10.05
Elijah, a troubled AC, enters Forthaven and attacks a citizen. Fleur wants to return him to his people and seeks the help of Cass and Rudi. Expeditionaries make a stunning discovery.
5	"Episode 5"	Andy Goddard	Ben Richards and Jimmy Gardner	21 February 2011	2.70	10.8
Pak, an old expeditionary, leads Cass and Fleur around radioactive areas to a diamond-scattered beach with skeletons of a hominid-like family in the foreshore. Julius secretly contacts spaceship CT-10.
6	"Episode 6"	Andy Goddard	David Farr	27 February 2011	1.52	10.5
Three expeditionaries disappear and nobody seems to know why they were outside the town. One returns but the mystery only gets deeper. The ACs hatch a plot of their own. A choice must be made between the life of a mother, or that of her baby. Julius secretly continues to contact spaceship CT-10.
7	"Episode 7"	Jamie Payne	David Farr	6 March 2011	1.33	9.7
Cass finds a note threatening to expose his secret, while Stella and Tate must face the prospect of another, superior, hostile lifeform on Carpathia.
8	"Episode 8"	Jamie Payne	Ben Richards	13 March 2011	1.56	11.6
A deadly virus hits Forthaven and Berger sets about bringing down Tate's government. A disturbing secret about Fleur is revealed and many people including Tipper and Lily are infected by the virus but are saved and CT-10 spaceship is about to land.

== Reception ==
Writing in The Independent, Brian Viner admitted that at first Outcasts rekindled his prejudices about science fiction but he was gradually sucked in. The first episode was "well written", "smartly directed" and "splendidly acted". These quotes are also used as blurb on the cover of the Blu-ray Disc release of the series.

However, other reviews for the series were generally more negative. Reviewing for The Daily Telegraph, Chris Harvey found it "one of the most staggeringly uninteresting dramas that’s been on television for a while", "drab" and "pretty turgid human drama."

Kevin O'Sullivan writing for The Daily Mirror said, "Hermione Norris and Daniel Mays in excrutiating [sic] sci-fi rubbish", and "Who directed it? Ed Wood? And what a script! So jaw-droppingly dreadful it hurt".

The Times reviewer, David Chater wrote, "Not since Bonekickers has the BBC broadcast such an irredeemably awful series. Sometimes catastrophes on this scale can be enjoyed precisely because they are so dismal, but this one has a kind of grinding badness that defies enjoyment of any kind".

Andrew Anthony for The Observer concluded, "All along I've been misreading the series as a kind of cosmic tragedy when in reality it was a tragic comedy. It wasn't trying to be wise. Deep down, Carpathia was pure Morecambe."

Discussion of the series and its plot/script issues took place across various sites, including The Guardian's episode by episode review by Phelim O'Neill, an interactive interview with writer/creator Ben Richards, and at Digital Spy.

Audience figures for the series were poor: starting from an initial low figure of 4.5 million viewers for the pilot episode, the show lost nearly two-thirds over its run, to finish with 1.56 million UK viewers.

== Scheduling and cancellation ==
Having originally launched on Mondays and Tuesdays at 21:00, The Guardian reported that after disappointing ratings, the fifth episode would be the last in this prime time slot, with subsequent episodes being rescheduled to late nights on Sundays.

Ben Richards, the writer/creator of the show, remained defiant, commenting, "I have every confidence we will rule our new slot. Clear eyes, full hearts, can't lose!" and "Cultdom beckons. And keep watching hardcore because remaining eps great."

On 14 March 2011 (the day following the final episode), the BBC confirmed that Outcasts had been cancelled, and that there would be no second series. A second series was in planning by this point, and some scenes had actually been shot, which Richards has said he intends to write as a novel instead.

== International broadcast ==
Country	Network	First broadcast
Australia	ABC1	28 May 2011
Canada	SPACE	18 June 2011
USA	BBC America	18 June 2011
Scandinavia	Canal+ Scandinavia	October 2011
New Zealand	Choice TV	August 2012

== DVD releases ==
Outcasts was released as both a three-disc DVD and two-disc Blu-ray Disc package on the 4 April 2011, through 2 Entertain, BBFC rated 15.

Format	Prod. code ASIN ref	Other details	Special Features
DVD; 3 disc	BBCDVD3339; B004M5J7XU	Region 2, Anamorphic Widescreen 16:9, PAL, Run Time 470 minutes, English language, English subtitles	Reaching out to the stars: Hear from the Producers, writers and cast from the series.; Forthaven – Set Tour
Blu-ray Disc; 2 disc	BBCBD0156; B004PFB8K2	Region 2, Anamorphic Widescreen 16:9, PAL, Run Time 470 minutes, English language, English subtitles	Reaching out to the stars: Hear from the Producers, writers and cast from the series.; Forthaven – Set Tour
