= Rochelle Neil =

British actress

- Occupation: Actress
- Years active: 2006–present
- Spouse: Jesper Borulf (m. 2012)
- Children: 1

Rochelle Neil is an English actress. She began her career in theatre. On television, she is known for her roles in the Sky One drama Das Boot (2020), the HBO series The Nevers (2021–2023), and the ITV miniseries Three Little Birds (2023).

== Early life ==
Neil was born in the East London Borough of Waltham Forest. She is of Jamaican and Grenadian descent. Neil began attending the Italia Conti Academy of Theatre Arts when she was 13.

== Career ==
Neil made her professional stage debut in Fantastic Mr Fox at Regent's Park Open Air Theatre in 2007. She played Mayme in Lynn Nottage's Evening Standard Theatre Award-nominated Intimate Apparel at the Park Theatre. To prepare for the latter role, Neil learned ragtime piano. She appeared in two Triforce Film Festival short films: Gracie with Kate Dickie and Could You Be My Match.

Neil played Adina in the television film adaptation of Zadie Smith's NW and had a recurring role as Jessica in the fifth series of the BBC Two and Showtime sitcom Episodes. In 2018, Neil was invited to take part in the BAFTA Newcomers Program in Los Angeles. While in Los Angeles, Neil performed the voice and motion capture of Faye in the EA video game Anthem.

In 2020, Neil joined the cast of the German Sky One war series Das Boot for its second season as Cassandra Lloyd, a Harlem jazz singer. As announced in 2019, Neil played Annie Carbey, a criminal with the ability to control fire, in the 2021 HBO science fiction drama series The Nevers. After being pulled from HBO Max, the latter half of The Nevers episodes were released on Tubi in 2023. Also in 2021, Neil played Yvonne in the second series of the BBC Scotland thriller Guilt.

Neil starred as the lead character Leah Whittaker in Lenny Henry's 2023 miniseries Three Little Birds for ITVX, inspired by his mother's story of arriving in Britain from Jamaica in the 1950s. To prepare for the role, Neil read her own Jamaican grandmother's memoir. She described the role as "a gift for an actor" due to the characters development, but told The Independent that the role took an emotional toll, saying "When we finished filming, I stayed in Coventry for an extra week because I just couldn’t stop crying" but that she saw it as a quintessentially "British story, because everyone’s lives changed. Everyone was exposed to new music, new culture… The UK as we know it now would not be the same country if it wasn’t for the immigration that has happened. It’s everyone’s story."

== Personal life ==
Neil is based between Stockholm and London and is married with a daughter.

== Filmography ==
=== Film ===
| Year | Title | Role | Notes |
|---|---|---|---|
| 2004 | Harry Potter and the Prisoner of Azkaban | School Girl | Uncredited |
| 2012 | Love & War | Woman | Short film |
| 2012 | Café | Woman | Short film |
| 2014 | The Guvnors | Steph | |
| 2015 | Could You Be My Match | Jada | Short film |
| 2015 | Gracie | Younger Gracie | Short film |
| 2016 | The Hand of The Creator | Zoe | |
| 2018 | Nika | Sarah | Short film |
| 2019 | Terminator: Dark Fate | C-5 CO-Pilot | |

=== Television ===
| Year | Title | Role | Notes |
|---|---|---|---|
| 2006 | Genie in the House | Dancer | Episode: "Do You Want to Dance?" |
| 2010 | Law & Order: UK | Sally-Anne Hope | Episode: "Skeletons" |
| 2013, 2015 | Doctors | Kelly Abraham / Laura Garson | 2 episodes |
| 2015 | Death in Paradise | Shelly Kennedy | Episode: "The Perfect Murder" |
| 2016 | NW | Adina | Television film |
| 2017 | Episodes | Jessica | 4 episodes (series 5) |
| 2017 | Hailmakers | Celeste | Pilot |
| 2018 | Free Rein: The Twelve Neighs of Christmas | Gigi | Christmas special |
| 2020 | Das Boot | Cassandra Lloyd | Main role; season 2 (7 episodes) |
| 2021–2023 | The Nevers | Annie Carbey | Main role |
| 2021 | Guilt | Yvonne | 4 episodes (series 2) |
| 2023 | Three Little Birds | Leah Whittaker | Miniseries |
| 2025 | The Gold | Kadene | Series 2 |
| 2026 | Lord of the Flies | Ralph's mum | 1 episode |

=== Video games ===
- Anthem (2019) as Faye

=== Stage ===
| Year | Title | Role | Notes |
|---|---|---|---|
| 2007 | Fantastic Mr Fox | Mrs Weasel | Regent's Park Open Air Theatre, London |
| 2009 | Chicago | Go-to-Hell-Kitty | New Theatre Oxford |
| 2011–2012 | Ghost | Ensemble | Piccadilly Theatre, London |
| 2013 | Soul Sister | Tina Turner (understudy) | Hackney Empire / Savoy Theatre, London |
| 2014 | Intimate Apparel | Mayme | Ustinov Studio, Bath / Park Theatre, London |
