= Lisa Lassek =

American film and television editor (born 1976)

- Born: August 24, 1976 (age 49); Philadelphia, Pennsylvania, United States
- Occupation: Film editor

Lisa Lassek is an American film and television editor. In addition to her editing career, her credits include her role as an associate producer for the television series Firefly. She edited episodes for the sixth season of Buffy the Vampire Slayer, served as an assistant editor for Angel, and has edited various episodes of Firefly. Lassek is a frequent collaborator of Joss Whedon, having edited his first feature-length film Serenity and the Marvel Cinematic Universe films, The Avengers and Avengers: Age of Ultron (which she co-edited with Jeffrey Ford). She has also collaborated with Drew Goddard, having edited his films The Cabin in the Woods and Bad Times at the El Royale.

Lassek is a native of Philadelphia, Pennsylvania and is an alumna of Vassar College and Boston University.

== Filmography ==
=== Film ===
Year	Film	Director	Other notes
2005	Serenity	Joss Whedon	
2011	The Cabin in the Woods	Drew Goddard	
2012	The Avengers	Joss Whedon	with Jeffrey Ford
2015	Avengers: Age of Ultron	Joss Whedon	with Jeffrey Ford
2017	The Circle	James Ponsoldt	
2018	12 Strong	Nicolai Fuglsig	
2018	Bad Times at the El Royale	Drew Goddard	
2023	Leave the World Behind	Sam Esmail	
2025	Dust Bunny	Bryan Fuller	
2026	The Bluff	Frank E. Flowers	

=== Television ===
Year	Title	Other notes
1997	Buffy the Vampire Slayer	Editor from 2001-2003
1999	Angel	Assistant Editor from 1999-2004
2002	Firefly	Editor
2003	Tru Calling	Editor
2003	Wonderfalls	Editor
2006	Blade: The Series	Editor for Episode "Pilot"
2007	Pushing Daisies	Editor from 2007-2009
2008	Dr. Horrible's Sing-Along Blog	Editor
2009	Community	Editor
2016	The OA	Editor
2021	The Nevers	Editor
