= Viola Prettejohn =

British actress

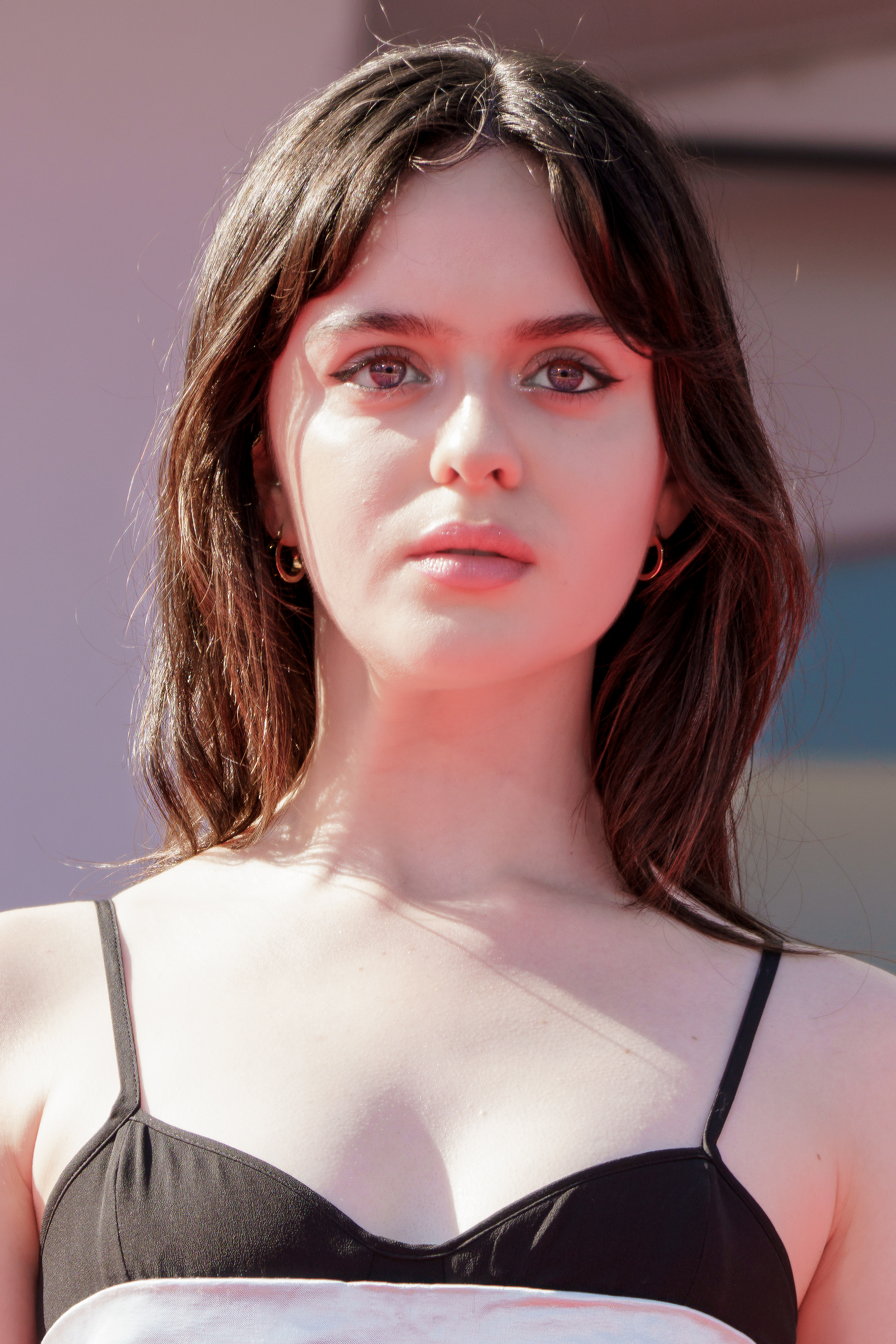
- Prettejohn 2025 Venice Film Festival
- Born: Viola Margaret Jane Prettejohn
- Years active: 2018–present

Viola Margaret Jane Prettejohn is a British actress. She is known for her role as Myrtle Haplisch in the HBO series The Nevers (2021–2023). She played young Princess Elizabeth in the sixth season of The Crown (2023) on Netflix.

== Early life and education ==
Prettejohn was born to mother Claire, a lawyer, and father Nick, the chairman of TSB Bank, and grew up in Kensington, London. She attended Garden House School and then St Paul's Girls' School.

== Career ==
Prettejohn made her television debut in the second season of the Starz series Counterpart as a young version of Olivia Williams' character Emily.

In August 2019, Prettejohn joined the cast of the Joss Whedon series The Nevers on HBO as Myrtle Hapslich. That year, she also played Fake Ciri in the Netflix television series The Witcher.

In 2023, Prettejohn played a teenage Princess Elizabeth on series six of The Crown in flashback scenes set on Victory in Europe Day alongside Beau Gadsdon as young Princess Margaret. In so doing, she became the fifth actress after Claire Foy, Olivia Colman, Imelda Staunton, and Verity Russell to play Elizabeth on the series. That year, she filmed the role of Finn in Ben Wheatley zombie-satire Generation Z for Channel 4.

She had a role in the BBC One adaptation of Hilary Mantel's Wolf Hall: The Mirror and the Light as Mary FitzRoy, Duchess of Richmond and Somerset. In 2025, she could be seen in Joe Barton historical drama series Amadeus.

== Filmography ==
Key
†	Denotes works that have not yet been released

Year	Title	Role	Notes
2018	Counterpart	Young Emily	Episode: "Point of Departure"
2019	The Witcher	Fake Ciri	Episode: "Before a Fall"
2021–2023	The Nevers	Myrtle Hapslich	Main role, 12 episodes
2023	The Crown	Young Princess Elizabeth	Episode: "Ritz" and "Sleep, Dearie Sleep"
2024	Generation Z	Finn	Main role, 6 episodes
2024	Wolf Hall: The Mirror and the Light	Mary Fitzroy	3 episodes
2025	The Testament of Ann Lee	Nancy Lee	
2025	Amadeus	Princess Elizabeth	
TBA	Brides†	TBA	Filming
