= Tom Riley (actor) =

English actor (born 1981)

- Riley in 2026
- Born: 5 April 1981 (age 45); Maidstone, Kent, England
- Education: University of Birmingham; London Academy of Music and Dramatic Art
- Occupations: Actor, producer, director
- Years active: 2002–present
- Spouse: Lizzy Caplan (m. 2017)
- Children: 1

Tom Riley (born 5 April 1981) is an English actor, producer, and director known for his work in theatre, both on the West End, Broadway and Off-Broadway. He has been nominated for a Drama Desk Award for his performance in Tom Stoppard's Arcadia on Broadway in 2011.

== Early life ==
Riley was born in Maidstone, Kent, England. He became involved in drama in his hometown at the age of four, and spent his school years writing and directing plays. He attended Maidstone Grammar School. He studied English literature and Drama at the University of Birmingham, graduating in 2002 with first class honours, and graduated from the London Academy of Music and Dramatic Art (LAMDA) in 2005. After his undergraduate studies, he formed the theater company Article 19, and while attending the LAMDA began working with the Royal Court Theatre company, appearing in the play The Woman Before.

== Career ==
In 2008 Riley performed alongside Indira Varma and Anton Lesser in the UK premiere of David Hare's The Vertical Hour, directed by Jeremy Herrin at The Royal Court Theatre, London.

Riley made his Broadway debut in 2011, in a revival of Tom Stoppard's Arcadia. He is set to return to New York to appear in the 2026 production of Nick Payne's The Unbelievers at Manhattan Theatre Club as David opposite Lauren Ambrose.

== Personal life ==
In May 2016, Riley became engaged to American actress Lizzy Caplan. They had met in January 2015 while Caplan was filming in London, and made their red carpet debut as a couple at the Prague Opera Ball in February 2016. They were married in September 2017, and their son was born in 2021.

== Filmography ==
=== Film ===
Year	Title	Role	Ref.
2006	A Few Days in September	David	
2007	I Want Candy	Joe	
2007	Return to House on Haunted Hill	Paul	
2009	Happy Ever Afters	Freddie Butler	
2009	St Trinian's 2: The Legend of Fritton's Gold	Romeo	
2015	Kill Your Friends	Parker-Hall	
2016	Pushing Dead	Mike	
2016	Starfish	Tom Ray	
2017	Modern Life Is Rubbish	Adrian	
2018	Ghost Light	Thomas Ingram / the Scottish King	
2023	The Caine Mutiny Court-Martial	Lieutenant Willis Keith	

=== Television ===
Year	Title	Role	Notes	Ref.
2006	Casualty 1906	Dr. James Walton	1 episode	
2007	Agatha Christie's Marple	Bobby Argyle	Episode: "Ordeal by Innocence"	
2007	Freezing	Dave Beethoven		
2008	Casualty 1907	Dr. James Walton	1 episode	
2008	Lewis	Philip Horton	Episode: "And the Moonbeams Kiss the Sea"	
2008	Freezing	Dave Beethoven	2 episodes	
2008	Agatha Christie's Poirot	Raymond Boynton	Episode: "Appointment with Death"	
2008	Lost in Austen	George Wickham		
2009	No Heroics	Nigel / Brainstorm	Pilot	
2010	Bouquet of Barbed Wire	Gavin Sorensen		
2011	Bedlam	Rob		
2011–12	Monroe	Dr. Laurence Shepherd	12 episodes	
2013–15	Da Vinci's Demons	Leonardo da Vinci	28 episodes	
2014	Doctor Who	Robin Hood	Episode: "Robot of Sherwood"	
2015	Inside No. 9	Adam	Episode: "The 12 Days of Christine"	
2016	The Collection	Claude Sabine	Amazon Prime UK	
2016	Dark Heart	DI Will Wagstaffe	6 episodes	
2017	Angie Tribeca	Doctor Frederick Wurst		
2017	Ill Behaviour	Charlie	6 episodes	
2021–23	The Nevers	Augustus "Augie" Bidlow	Main cast	
2022	The Woman in the House Across the Street from the Girl in the Window	Neil	Limited series; main cast	
2023	Murder is Easy	Lord Whitfield	Two-part drama	
2025	Down Cemetery Road	Mark	Main cast	

=== Stage ===
Year	Title	Role	Venue	Ref.
2006	The Woman Before	Andi	West End, Royal Court Theatre	
2008	The Vertical Hour	Philip Lucas	West End, Royal Court Theatre	
2010	Hurts Given and Received	Bach	Riverside Studios	
2011	Arcadia	Septimus Hodge	Broadway, Ethel Barrymore Theatre	
2011	My City	Richard Kenton	West End, Almeida Theatre	
2018	Dry Powder	Seth	West End, Hampstead Theatre	
2023	Dancing at Lughnasa	Gerry	West End, Royal National Theatre	
2026	The Unbelievers	David	Off-Broadway, Manhattan Theatre Club	

== Awards and nominations ==
Year	Award	Category	Work	Result	Ref.
2011	Drama Desk Award	Outstanding Featured Actor in a Play	Arcadia	Nominated	
2014	BAFTA Awards Cymru	Best Actor	Da Vinci's Demons	Won	
