= Zackary Momoh =

British-Nigerian actor (born 1988)

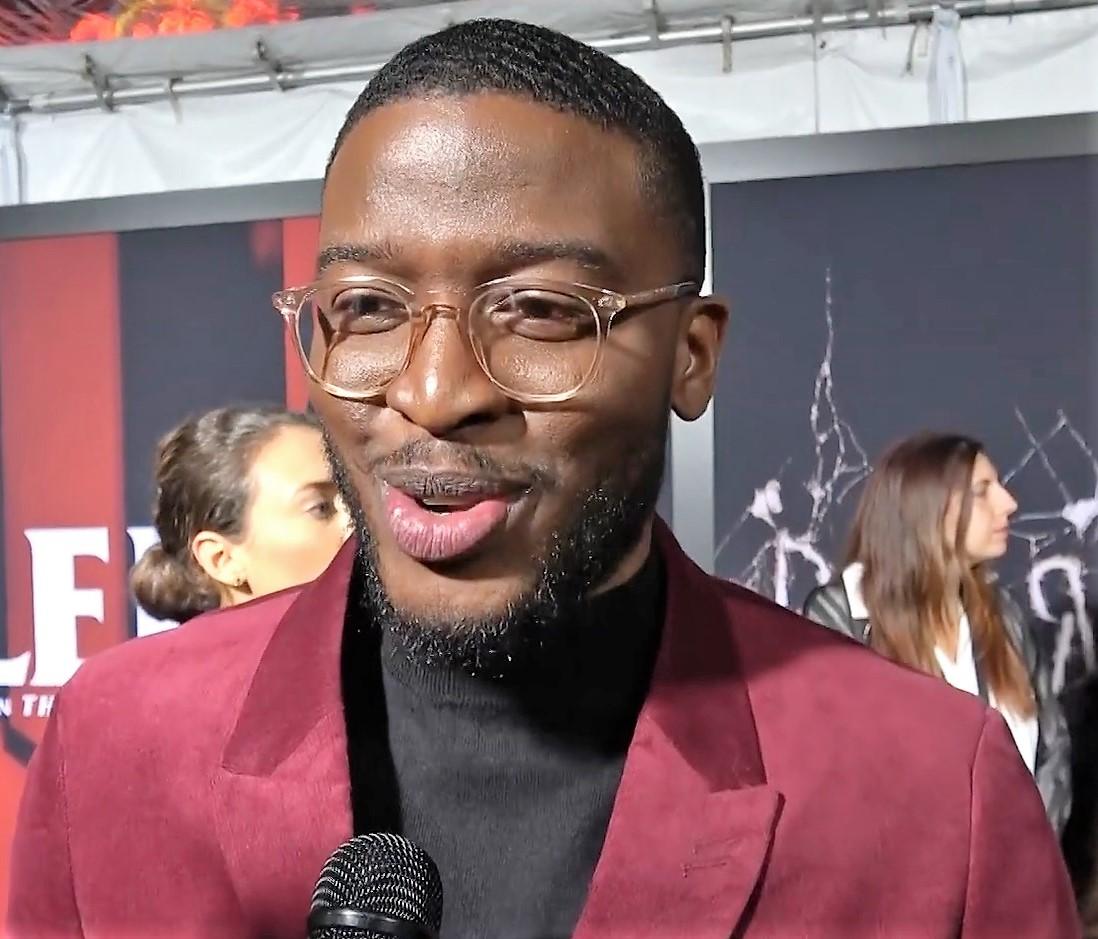
- Momoh at the Los Angeles premiere of Doctor Sleep
- Born: July 1988 (age 38); Lambeth, London, England
- Education: Identity School of Acting
- Occupation: Actor
- Years active: 2010–present
- Spouse: Lashana Lynch

Zackary Momoh (born July 1988) is a British-Nigerian actor. He began his career in theatre and made his feature film debut in A United Kingdom (2016). On television, he is known for his roles in the Netflix crime drama Seven Seconds (2018) and the HBO fantasy series The Nevers (2021).

== Early life ==
Momoh was born in the South London Borough of Lambeth. He is of Nigerian descent. He participated in talent shows growing up. He began his studies in business marketing at university before deciding he wanted to pursue a career in acting. He trained part-time at Identity School of Acting (IDSA).

== Filmography ==
Key
†	Denotes works that have not yet been released

=== Film ===
Year	Title	Role	Notes
2010	The Prize Fighter	Thomas Molineaux	Short film; voice role
2011	The Swordsman of Trelawny	Leonard Parkinson	Short film; voice role
2013	Spongebob Squarepants 4D Attraction: The Great Jelly Rescue		Short film
2013	Othello	Othello (understudy) / various	National Theatre Live
2014	Clap!	Zack	Short film
2016	A United Kingdom	Oluwu	
2017	American Assassin	Zach	Uncredited
2018	Twelfth Night	Antonio	
2019	The Kill Team	Sergeant Bruer	
2019	Harriet	John Tubman	
2019	Doctor Sleep	David Stone	
2027	Children of Blood and Bone †		Post-production

=== Television ===
Year	Title	Role	Notes
2011	Holby City	Gabriel	Episode: "Keep On Keeping On"
2011	Doctors	Kelvin Watts	Episode: "Who's the Daddy?"
2014	Doctors	Hasan Haruna	Episode: "Fast and Furious"
2015	Hot Pepper	Anton	Web series; episode: "One-Night Stand"
2016	Camping	Biggs	Episode #1.3
2017	No Offence	Manni Attah	7 episodes
2018	Seven Seconds	Seth Butler	Main role
2019	Death in Paradise	Harrison Green	2 episodes
2021–2023	The Nevers	Dr Horatio Cousens	Main role
2024	Parish	The Horse	6 episodes

== Stage ==
Year	Title	Role	Notes
2010	Palm, Wine and Stout	Femi	UK tour
2013	Othello	Othello	CLF Art Cafe, London
2013	Othello	Othello (understudy) / Various	Royal National Theatre, London
2013	From Morning to Midnight	Various	Royal National Theatre, London
2014	To Kill a Mockingbird	Tom Robinson	Regent's Park Open Air Theatre, London

== Awards and nominations ==
Year	Award	Category	Work	Result	Ref
2014	The Offies	Best Cast	Othello	Nominated	
