= Denis O'Hare =

American actor (born 1962)

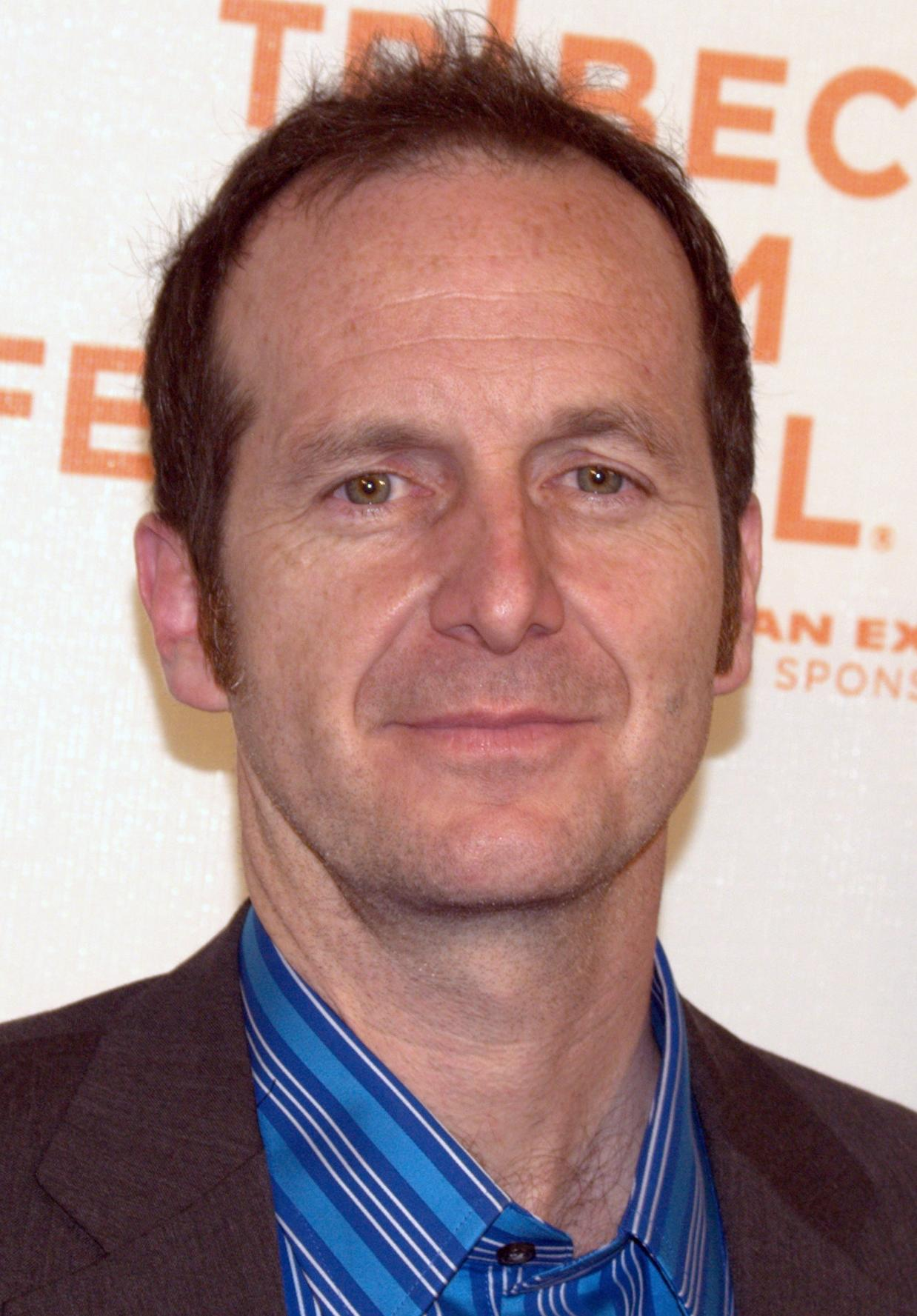
- At the premiere of An Englishman in New York, Tribeca Festival, 2009
- Born: Denis Patrick Seamus O'Hare; January 17, 1962 (age 64); Kansas City, Missouri, U.S.
- Education: Northwestern University School of Communication
- Occupation: Actor
- Years active: 1982–present
- Spouse: Hugo Redwood (m. 2011)
- Children: 1
- Website: denisohare.com

Denis Patrick Seamus O'Hare (born January 17, 1962) is an American actor noted for his award-winning performances in the plays Take Me Out and Sweet Charity, as well as portraying vampire king Russell Edgington on the HBO fantasy series True Blood. He is also known for his supporting roles in such films as Charlie Wilson's War (2007), Milk (2008), Changeling (2008), and Dallas Buyers Club (2013). In 2011, he starred as Larry Harvey in the first season of the FX anthology series American Horror Story, for which he was nominated for a Primetime Emmy Award for Outstanding Supporting Actor in a Miniseries or a Movie in 2012. He returned to the show in 2013, playing Spalding in American Horror Story: Coven and once more as Stanley in American Horror Story: Freak Show, the latter for which he earned a second Primetime Emmy Award nomination. For his performance in American Horror Story: Hotel as Liz Taylor, O'Hare received critical acclaim.

== Early life ==
O'Hare was born in Kansas City, Missouri, the son of Margaret Karene (née Kennedy; January 25, 1931 – October 8, 2008) and John M. O'Hare. He has three sisters, Pam, Patricia and Kathleen, and one brother, Michael. O'Hare grew up in the suburbs of Detroit, living in Southfield until he was 15, when his family moved to Wing Lake in Bloomfield Hills. His mother was a musician and he grew up playing the church organ. O'Hare is of Irish descent and holds an Irish passport.

As a teenager, O'Hare was in his school's choir, and in 1974, he went to his first audition, gaining a chorus part in a community theatre production of Show Boat. In 1980, O'Hare left Detroit for Chicago to study theatre at Northwestern University.

== Career ==
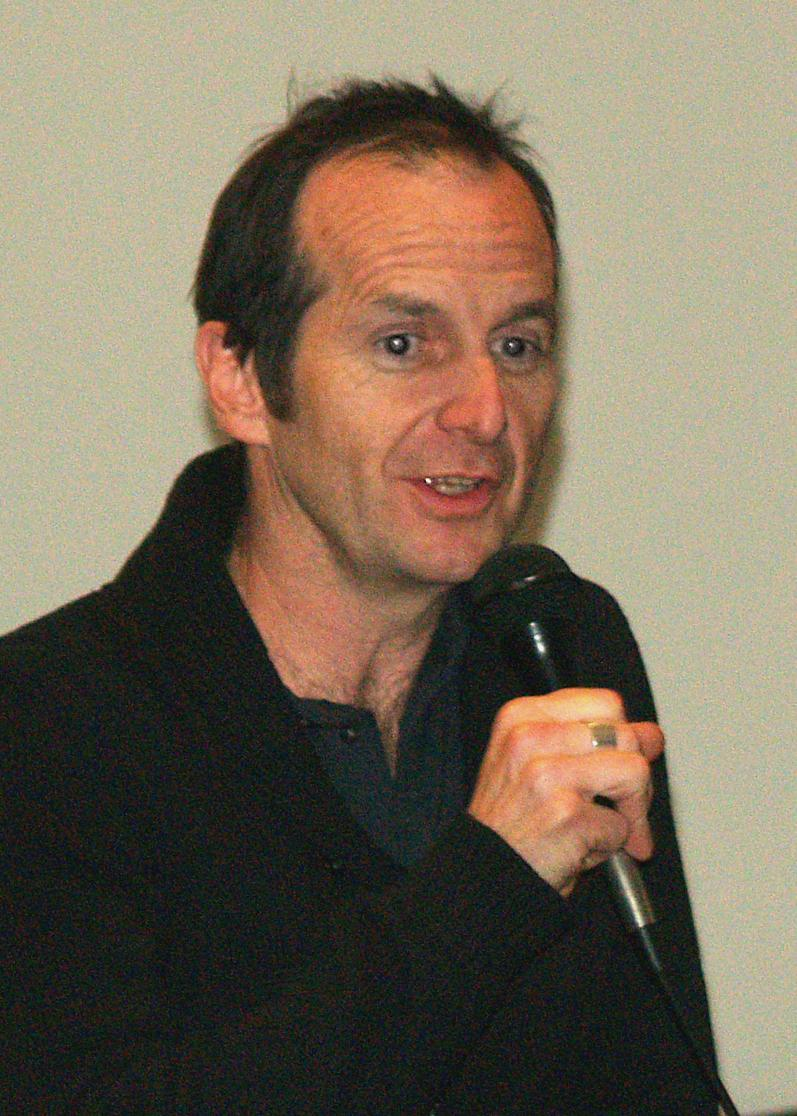
O'Hare discussing his role in Milk and the film's subject

O'Hare won a Tony Award for Best Performance by a Featured Actor in a Play for his performance in Richard Greenberg's Take Me Out, where his character's lengthy monologues in which he slowly falls in love with the game of baseball were considered the main reason for his award. He won the 2005 Drama Desk Award for Outstanding Featured Actor in a Musical for his role as Oscar Lindquist in the Broadway revival of Sweet Charity.

In 2003, O'Hare played a doctor in 21 Grams. In 2004, he played Charles J. Guiteau in the Broadway production of Stephen Sondheim's Assassins, for which he was nominated for the Best Performance by a Featured Actor in a Musical Tony Award. He lost to co-star Michael Cerveris who played John Wilkes Booth. Before appearing in those shows, he appeared on Broadway in the 1998 revival of Cabaret, in which he played Ernst Ludwig onstage and the clarinet in the show's orchestra, the Kit Kat Band. O'Hare was featured in the Hallmark Hall of Fame presentation of Saint Maybe. He has appeared as a guest star on several episodes of Law & Order and its spin-offs, Law & Order: Special Victims Unit and Law & Order: Criminal Intent.

In 2008, he appeared as a guest star on several episodes of Brothers & Sisters. His feature film credits include The Anniversary Party, 21 Grams, Garden State, Derailed, Michael Clayton, A Mighty Heart, Half Nelson, Milk, Edge of Darkness, Charlie Wilson's War and Changeling. In 2009, O'Hare portrayed Phillip Steele (an amalgam character based on Quentin Crisp's friends Phillip Ward and Tom Steele) in a television biopic on Crisp entitled An Englishman in New York. The same year he played therapist Dr. David Worth in the series Bored to Death (episode 1.3).

Lisa Peterson and O'Hare developed a 100-minute one-person play, An Iliad, based on Robert Fagles' translation of the Iliad for New York Theatre Workshop. It premiered in 2010 at the Seattle Repertory Theatre and was performed in the same year by Stephen Spinella at the McCarter Theatre, Princeton, New Jersey, before opening in New York in 2012 with O'Hare and Spinella alternating. David Wenham starred in the play in 2026 for the Sydney Theatre Company.

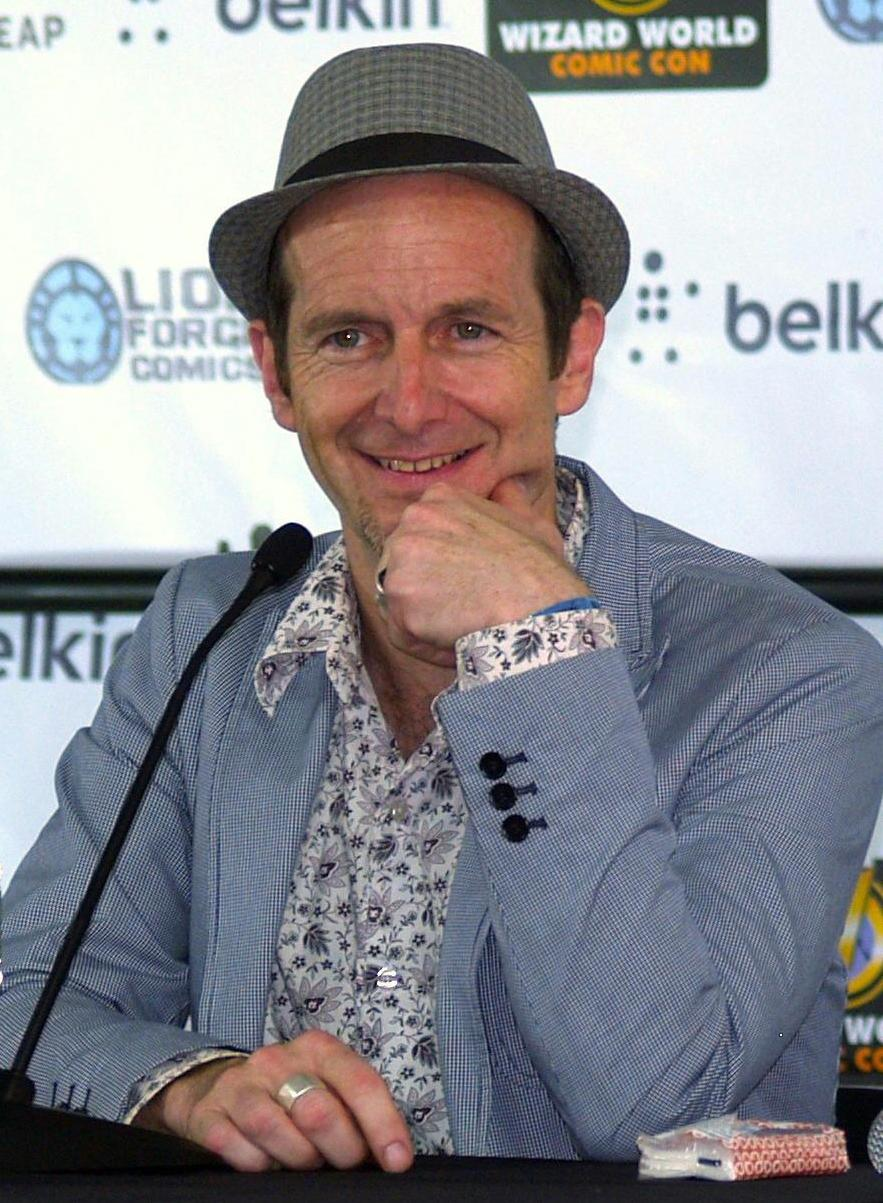
O'Hare at the 2013 Wizard World New York Experience

In 2010, O'Hare joined the cast of HBO's True Blood in its third season as Russell Edgington, the vampire king of Mississippi who is 2,800 years old. In 2011, he appeared in the film The Eagle as a Roman officer named Lutorius. He has appeared in a recurring role as Judge Charles Abernathy on the television drama series The Good Wife and The Good Fight. O'Hare also co-starred as Larry Harvey in FX's first season of American Horror Story, Murder House.

In 2012, O'Hare starred alongside Amy Adams and Donna Murphy as the Baker in Stephen Sondheim's Into the Woods at The Public Theater. The production played at the Delacorte Theatre in Central Park, NYC, from July 23 to September 1, 2012. In 2013, O'Hare returned to American Horror Story for its third season, American Horror Story: Coven, where he portrayed Spalding, the house butler. O'Hare portrayed con artist, Stanley on the fourth season of the series, American Horror Story: Freak Show. In 2015, O'Hare played a hotel worker, Liz Taylor on the fifth season of the series, American Horror Story: Hotel, and in 2016, he was Dr. Elias Cunningham on the sixth season, American Horror Story: Roanoke. Most recently, O'Hare portrayed the Provincetown resident Holden Vaughn on the tenth season, American Horror Story: Double Feature.

In 2023–2024, he played Man in Stephen Sondheim's final musical, Here We Are.

Currently O'Hare is playing Wally Baker in the Netflix series The Boroughs (2026).

== Personal life ==
O'Hare is gay and has been married to designer Hugo Redwood since July 28, 2011. The couple have an adopted son, Declan. He identifies as an atheist.

== See also ==
- List of Broadway musicals stars
