= Amy Manson =

Scottish actress (born 1985)

- Born: 9 September 1985 (age 41); Aberdeenshire, Scotland
- Education: Central School of Speech and Drama
- Occupation: Actress
- Years active: 2006–present

Amy Manson (born 9 September 1985) is a Scottish actress. She has portrayed Alice Guppy in Torchwood, Abby Evans in Casualty, Lizzie Siddal in Desperate Romantics, Daisy Hannigan-Spiteri in Being Human, Medea in Atlantis, and Merida in the fifth season of the ABC fairy tale drama series Once Upon a Time.

== Background ==
Born and brought up in Aberdeenshire, Scotland, Manson has one sister, Ailsa Manson and one brother, James Manson, born in Sept Manson of Clan Gunn. She attended Stage Coach, a Saturday drama school, before leaving home for London at the age of seventeen. She trained at the Central School of Speech and Drama, leaving early to film Pumpkinhead: Blood Feud in Romania. She lives in North London.

== Career ==
Manson made her film debut in Pumpkinhead: Blood Feud, and has also appeared in the horror film Blood Monkey and the short film Smile Emily.

Manson has lent her voice to the radio dramas Lost in Plain Sight, The Summer Walking and The Dead Hour.

On television, she played Alice Guppy in two episodes of Torchwood, and appeared as Abby Evans in nine episodes of Casualty. She has guest-starred in episodes of Doctors, The Bill and My Family.

Manson played Lizzie Siddal, muse, wife and lover of Dante Gabriel Rossetti, in the BBC Two period drama Desperate Romantics. She appeared as the vampire Daisy Hannigan-Spiteri in series two of Being Human, alongside Desperate Romantics co-star Aidan Turner.

Manson played Ginger Corrigan in the 2010 adaptation of Agatha Christie's Marple: The Pale Horse, and also played Fleur Morgan in Outcasts, an eight-part series by Kudos for BBC One. In 2011, Manson portrayed Leah in the third series of Misfits and Emma "Whirly" Tyson in the BBC drama Young James Herriot.

She also appears in the fifth series of Irish drama Raw.

In 2024, she appeared as Rhona Moncrieffe in the BBC drama, Rebus, an adaptation of the Inspector Rebus series by Ian Rankin.

== Awards ==
Manson won Best Performance (Female) at the 2008 Critics' Awards for Theatre in Scotland, for playing Stepdaughter in the National Theatre of Scotland production of Six Characters in Search of an Author.

== Filmography ==
=== Film ===
Year	Film	Role	Notes
2007	Pumpkinhead: Blood Feud	Jodie Hatfield	
2007	Blood Monkey	Amy Armstrong	
2013	Not Another Happy Ending	Darsie	
2013	Harrigan	Vickey Frizell	
2015	Two Down	Air Hostess Call Girl	
2015	The Chameleon	Pamela	
2015	Estranged	January	
2017	T2 Trainspotting	Woman in Club	
2017	Edie	Fiona	
2019	Run	Katie	
2019	Beats	Cat	
2019	Doom: Annihilation	Lt. Joan Dark	credited as Amy Mason
2021	Spencer	Anne Boleyn	
2021	She Will	Lois	

=== Television ===
Year	Show	Role	Notes
2006	The Bill	Martine McKenzie	Episode: "405"
2007	My Family	Casting P.A.	Episode: "Breaking Up Ain't Hard To Do"
2007	Nearly Famous	Melanie	Episode: "1.5"
2008	Doctors	Kelly Moore	Episode: "Jack the Lad"
2008	Torchwood	Alice Guppy	Episodes: "Fragments", "Exit Wounds"
2008–2009	Casualty	Abby Evans	9 episodes
2009	Desperate Romantics	Lizzie Siddal	Period drama
2010	Being Human	Daisy	6 episodes
2010	Agatha Christie's Marple: The Pale Horse	Ginger Corrigan	Television film
2011	Outcasts	Fleur Morgan	8 episodes
2011	Misfits	Leah	Episode: "3.6"
2011	Young James Herriot	Emma "Whirly" Tyson	3 episodes
2011	The Field of Blood	Karen Burnett	
2014–2015	Atlantis	Medea	
2015–2016	Once Upon a Time	Merida	Recurring role, 8 episodes
2017	The White Princess	Cathy Gordon	4 episodes
2018	Legacies	Dryad	1 episode
2021–2023	The Nevers	Sarah / Maladie	Main cast
2021–2023	The Nevers	Effie Boyle	Episode: "Hanged" Credited as Margaret Tuttle
2023	The Diplomat	Giselle	2 episodes
2023	The Chemistry of Death	Ellen McLeod	4 episodes
2023	Bodies	Charlotte Hillinghead	6 episodes
2024	Rebus	Rhona Moncrieffe	
2026	Half Man	Mona Shiels	3 episodes

== Theatre ==
Year	Film	Role	Company	Director	Notes
2008	Six Characters in Search of an Author	Stepdaughter	Lyceum Theatre, Edinburgh and Citizens Theatre, Glasgow		
2015	The Caucasian Chalk Circle	Grusha	Lyceum Theatre, Edinburgh	Mark Thomson	adaptation by Alistair Beaton
