= Laura Donnelly =

Actress from Northern Ireland (born 1982)

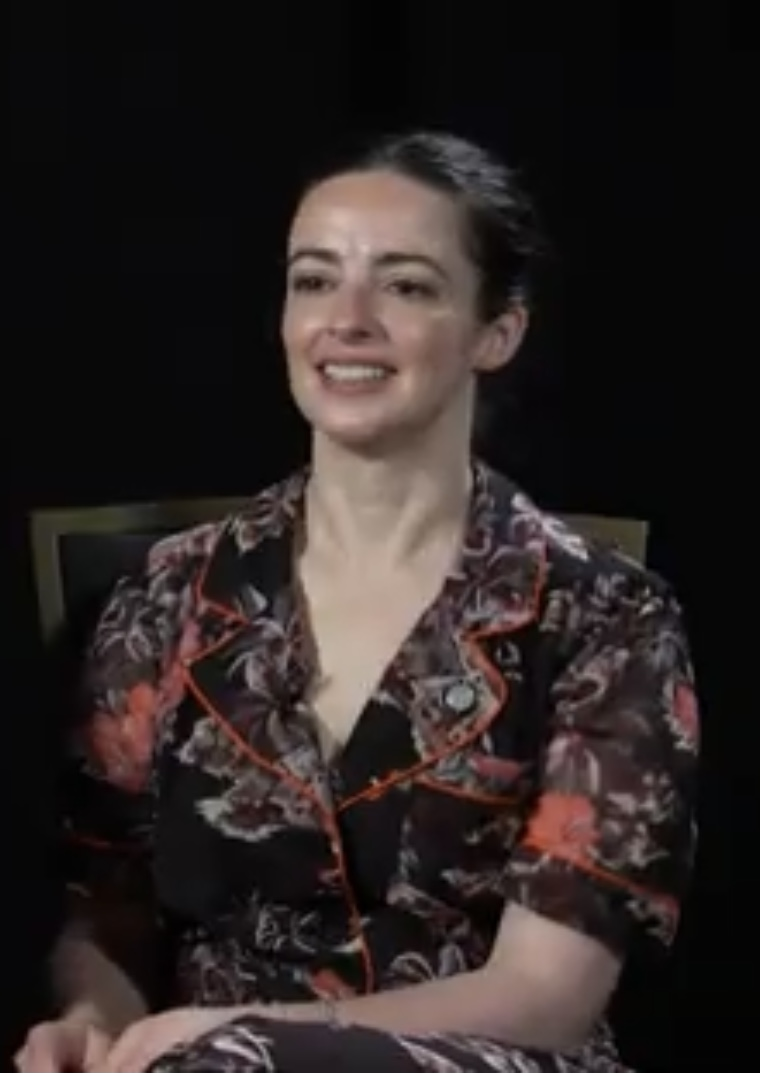
- Donnelly in 2019
- Born: 24 June 1982 (age 44); Belfast, Northern Ireland
- Education: Royal Conservatoire of Scotland (B.A.)
- Occupation: Actress
- Years active: 2004–present
- Partner: Jez Butterworth
- Children: 2
- Awards: Laurence Olivier Award for Best Actress (2018)

Laura Donnelly (born 24 June 1982) is an actress from Northern Ireland. Known for her collaborations with playwright Jez Butterworth, Donnelly has appeared in the West End and Broadway productions of his plays The River (2012–2015), The Ferryman (2017–2019), and The Hills of California (2024). For her performance in The Ferryman, she won the Laurence Olivier Award for Best Actress and was nominated for the Tony Award for Best Actress in a Play. For The Hills of California, she won the Drama Desk Award and the Outer Critics Circle Award, and received additional Laurence Olivier Award and Tony Award nominations.

== Early life and education ==
Donnelly was born on 24 June 1982 in Belfast, Northern Ireland to a Catholic family. She grew up in the city during the height of the Troubles, a period of political and sectarian conflict that profoundly shaped her early life; the IRA murder of her maternal uncle, Eugene Simons, would later inspire her long-time partner, Jez Butterworth, to write the play The Ferryman. She has stated that her father is a doctor while her mother is a nurse.

As a child, Donnelly studied Irish dance and ballet under Patricia Mulholland. She attended the Rathmore Grammar School in Belfast, where she developed an early love for drama. Donnelly subsequently earned a B.A. in Acting from the Royal Conservatoire of Scotland in 2004.

== Career ==
=== 2004–2012: Early screen and stage work ===
After graduating from drama school in 2004, Donnelly began her career with stage productions in Dublin, Republic of Ireland and Edinburgh, Scotland before moving into television work in the mid-2000s. She made her screen debut in the Channel 4 drama Sugar Rush in 2005 and subsequently appeared in series including Casualty, Hex, and Merlin. In 2009 she starred in the horror film Dread, followed by a supporting role in the BBC drama Best: His Mother's Son, based on the life of footballer George Best. During this period she also continued to work extensively in theatre, appearing in productions at the Royal National Theatre, Royal Court Theatre, and Bush Theatre. In 2012 Donnelly appeared opposite Hugh Jackman in the original Royal Court production of Jez Butterworth's The River. The production later transferred to the Circle in the Square Theatre on Broadway, marking her Broadway debut.

=== 2013–2019: The Fall, Outlander, and The Ferryman ===
In 2013 Donnelly portrayed Sarah Kay in the BBC crime drama The Fall, starring opposite Gillian Anderson and Jamie Dornan. The following year she began appearing as Jenny Fraser Murray in the Starz historical drama Outlander, a role which brought her international recognition. She later appeared in the ITV fantasy series Beowulf: Return to the Shieldlands and the Sky UK/Amazon Prime Video historical drama series Britannia. In 2017, Donnelly originated the role of Caitlin Carney in Jez Butterworth's The Ferryman at the Royal Court Theatre, directed by Sam Mendes. Inspired in part by the disappearance and killing of Donnelly's uncle during The Troubles, the play became the fastest-selling production in the Royal Court's history.Later that year, the production transferred to the Gielgud Theatre on the West End, earning Donnelly the Laurence Olivier Award for Best Actress, as well as a nomination for the Evening Standard Theatre Award for Best Actress. In 2018, The Ferryman transferred to the Bernard B. Jacobs Theatre on Broadway. The production won the Tony Award for Best Play, while Donnelly was nominated for the Tony Award for Best Actress in a Play.

=== 2020–present: The Nevers and continued stage work ===
From 2021 to 2023, Donnelly starred as Amalia True in the HBO science-fiction drama The Nevers, created by Joss Whedon. Her performance received critical acclaim, as well as a nomination for the Critics' Choice Super Award for Best Actress in a Science Fiction/Fantasy Series. In 2022 she appeared as Elsa Bloodstone in the Marvel Cinematic Universe television special Werewolf by Night for Disney+. In January 2024, Donnelly returned to the West End in Jez Butterworth's The Hills of California at the Harold Pinter Theatre, directed by Sam Mendes. In the production she portrayed both Veronica Webb and the adult Joan Webb, earning a second nomination for the Laurence Olivier Award for Best Actress. The production subsequently transferred to the Broadhurst Theatre on Broadway. Donnelley's performance received wide-spread acclaim, earning both the Drama Desk Award for Outstanding Lead Performance in a Play and the Outer Critics Circle Award for Outstanding Lead Performer in a Broadway Play, as well as a second nomination for the Tony Award for Best Actress in a Play.

=== Television ===
On television, Donnelly is best known for her roles in the Starz series Outlander (2014–2017), the ITV series Beowulf (2016), and the HBO series The Nevers (2021–2023), for which she was nominated for the Critics' Choice Super Award for Best Actress in a Science Fiction/Fantasy Series. Her film roles include Dread (2009), Hello Carter (2013), The Program, (2015) Tolkien (2019), and Werewolf by Night (2022) as Elsa Bloodstone. In 2026, Donnelly starred as Charlotte in Season 2 of Apple TV's Sugar, also starring Colin Farrell.

== Personal life ==
Donnelly lives in London with her partner Jez Butterworth, and their two daughters.

== Acting credits ==
=== Film ===
Year	Title	Role	Notes	Ref.
2007	Be More Ethnic	Leanne O'Dwyer	BBC TV film	
2008	Insatiable	Rachel		
2009	Dread	Abby		
2009	Right Hand Drive	Ashley		
2009	Best: His Mother's Son	Barbara Best	BBC TV film	
2013	Hello Carter	Tara		
2014	Heart of Lightness	Ellida		
2015	The Program	Emma O'Reilly		
2019	Tolkien	Mabel Tolkien		
2022	Werewolf by Night	Elsa Bloodstone	Marvel TV film	
2023	The Heist Before Christmas	Patricia		

=== Television ===
Year	Title	Role	Notes	Ref.
2005	Sugar Rush	Beth	2 episodes	
2005	Casualty	Fleur Butler	7 episodes	
2005	Hex	Maya Robertson	4 episodes	
2006	The Bill	Jody Macmillan	Episode: "Chasing Shadows"	
2007	Rough Diamond	Aoife	Episode: "#1.3"	
2009	Occupation	Katy Hibbs	2 episodes	
2009	Merlin	Freya	2 episodes	
2010	Comedy Lab	Various	Episode: "iCandy"	
2012	Missing	Violet Heath	Main role: 10 episodes	
2013	The Fall	Sarah Kay	5 episodes	
2014–2017	Outlander	Janet "Jenny" Fraser Murray	Main role, 8 episodes	
2016	Beowulf: Return to the Shieldlands	Elvina	Main role, 13 episodes	
2018–2021	Britannia	Hella	6 episodes	
2021–2023	The Nevers	Zephyr Alexis Navine / Amalia True	Main role, 12 episodes	
2024	Say Nothing	Older Helen McConville	Miniseries; 3 episodes	
2026	Sugar	Charlotte	Streaming Series, 8 episodes	
2026	The Dark	Monica Kennedy	Filming	

=== Theatre ===
Year	Title	Role	Playwright	Venue	Ref.
2004	Boston Marriage	Catherine	David Mamet	Project Arts Centre, Dublin	
2007	Dancing at Lughnasa	Chrissie	Brian Friel	Lyric Theatre Belfast	
2008	A Midsummer Night's Dream	Hermia	William Shakespeare	Regent's Park Open Air Theatre, London	
2008	Romeo & Juliet	Juliet	William Shakespeare	Regent's Park Open Air Theatre, London	
2009	Judgement Day	Anna	Christopher Hampton & Ödön von Horváth	Almeida Theatre, West End	
2012	Philadelphia, Here I Come!	Katie Doogan	Brian Friel	Donmar Warehouse, West End	
2012	The River	Other Woman	Jez Butterworth	Royal Court Theatre, West End	
2013	Tutto Bene Mamma?	The Women	April De Angelis	The Print Room, London	
2014–2015	The River	Other Woman	Jez Butterworth	Circle in the Square, Broadway	
2015	The Wasp	Heather	Morgan Lloyd Malcolm	Trafalgar Studios, West End	
2017–2018	The Ferryman	Caitlin Carney	Jez Butterworth	Royal Court Theatre & Gielgud Theatre, West End	
2018–2019	The Ferryman	Caitlin Carney	Jez Butterworth	Bernard B. Jacobs Theatre, Broadway	
2024	The Hills of California	Veronica / Joan	Jez Butterworth	Harold Pinter Theatre, West End	
2024	The Hills of California	Veronica / Joan	Jez Butterworth	Broadhurst Theater, Broadway	

== Awards and nominations ==
Year	Award	Category	Work	Result	Ref.
2010	Fright Meter Awards	Best Supporting Actress	Dread	Nominated	
2017	Evening Standard Theatre Award	Best Actress	The Ferryman	Nominated	
2018	Laurence Olivier Award	Best Actress	The Ferryman	Won	
2019	Tony Award	Best Actress in a Play	The Ferryman	Nominated	
2022	Critics' Choice Super Awards	Best Actress in a Science Fiction/Fantasy Series	The Nevers	Nominated	
2024	Laurence Olivier Award	Best Actress	The Hills of California	Nominated	
2025	Tony Award	Best Actress in a Play	The Hills of California	Nominated	
2025	Drama Desk Award	Outstanding Lead Performance in a Play	The Hills of California	Won	
2025	Dorian Awards	Outstanding Lead Performer in a Play	The Hills of California	Nominated	
2025	Outer Critics Circle Award	Outstanding Lead Performer in a Broadway Play	The Hills of California	Won	
