= Joseph Maher =

Irish actor (1933–1998)

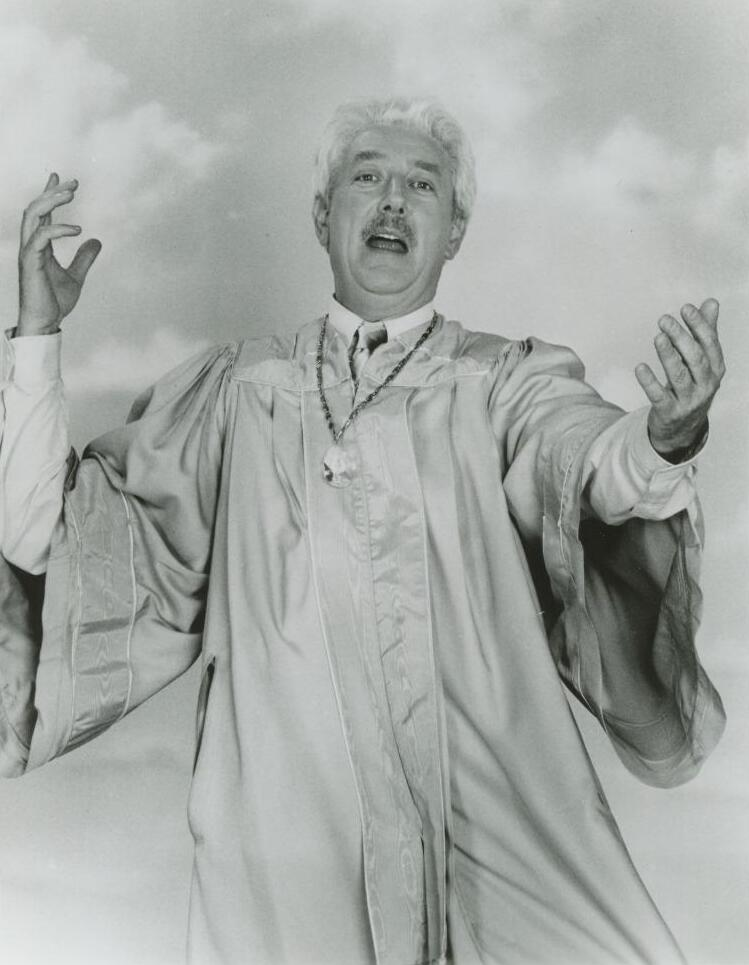
- Maher as St. Peter in Second Chance, c. 1987
- Born: Joseph Sylvester Maher (Note: "Joseph S. (Sylvie) Maher" is the inscription on his tombstone.); 29 December 1933; Westport, County Mayo, Ireland
- Died: 17 July 1998 (aged 64); Los Angeles, California, U.S.
- Resting place: Aughaval Cemetery, Westport
- Education: The Royal Conservatory of Music
- Occupation: Actor
- Years active: 1959–1998

Joseph Sylvester Maher (29 December 1933 – 17 July 1998) was an Irish actor. He was best known for his stage work on Broadway, particularly in the dark comedies of Joe Orton. He was a three-time Tony Award nominee and a Drama Desk Award winner, among other accolades.

== Early life and education ==
Maher was born in Westport, County Mayo, Ireland (then known as the Irish Free State), on 29 December 1933. He was one of ten children born to Delia A. (née O'Malley) and Joseph Maher Sr., a schoolteacher. He was affectionately known to friends and family as 'Sylvie'.

In 1951, he moved to England. Five years later, he emigrated to Canada, where he found work at an oil company in Toronto. Maher started acting with the Canadian Players while attending the Royal Conservatory of Music. He performed across Canada for three years before moving to New York City.

== Career ==
=== Theatre ===
Maher's Broadway credits include The Prime of Miss Jean Brodie, King Henry V, The Royal Family, Night and Day, and Loot. He was best known for his roles in the comedies of Joe Orton. He received three Tony Award nominations for his roles in the plays Spokesong, Night and Day, and Loot, with the last winning him a Drama Desk Award. His other accolades included an Obie Award (for Christopher Hampton's Savages) and a Laurence Olivier Award nomination (for Orton's What the Butler Saw).

Maher also had a long association with the Long Wharf Theatre in New Haven, Connecticut.

=== Film and television ===
Maher's film credits include For Pete's Sake, Heaven Can Wait, Time After Time, Just Tell Me What You Want, I'm Dancing as Fast as I Can, The Evil That Men Do, Frankenweenie, My Stepmother is an Alien, Sister Act, Funny Farm, I.Q., In & Out, The Shadow, Mars Attacks! and The Out-of-Towners.

Maher's appearances on television included roles in the soap operas Guiding Light and Another World. He also guest-starred in several other TV series including M*A*S*H, Wonder Woman, When Things Were Rotten, Ellery Queen, St. Elsewhere, ALF, Gimme a Break!, Moonlighting, Thirtysomething, Murder, She Wrote, Seinfeld, Tales from the Crypt and Chicago Hope.

== Death ==
Maher died of a brain tumor at his home in Los Angeles, California, on 17 July 1998, at age 64. He was buried at Aughaval Cemetery in his hometown of Westport, County Mayo.

== Filmography ==
Year	Title	Role	Notes
1966	Passages from James Joyce's Finnegans Wake	Celebrant	
1972	It Ain't Easy	Charlie	
1974	For Pete's Sake	Mr. Coates	
1976	Diary of the Dead	Walter Johnson	
1978	Heaven Can Wait	Sisk	
1979	Time After Time	Adams	
1980	Just Tell Me What You Want	Dr. Coleson	
1980	Those Lips, Those Eyes	Fibby Geyer	
1981	Going Ape!	Gridley	
1981	Under the Rainbow	The Duke	
1982	I'm Dancing as Fast as I Can	Doctor Kalman	
1984	The Evil That Men Do	Molloch	
1984	Frankenweenie	Mr. Chambers	Short film
1988	Funny Farm	Michael Sinclair	
1988	My Stepmother Is an Alien	Lucas Budlong	
1990	The Local Stigmatic	David	
1991	Seinfeld	Gavin	Episode: "The Dog"
1992	Sister Act	Monsignor O'Hara	
1992	Batman: The Animated Series	Emile Dorian (voice)	Episode: "Tyger Tyger"
1993	Partners	Edward Hooper	Television film
1994	Killer	Dr. Alstricht	
1994	The Shadow	Isaac Newboldt	
1994	I.Q.	Nathan Liebknecht	
1996	Surviving Picasso	Kahnweiler	
1996	Mars Attacks!	White House Decorator	
1997	In & Out	Father Tim	
1998	OK Garage	Lilly	
1998	Hoods	Dr. Alstrich	
1999	The Out-of-Towners	Mr. Wellstone	Final film role

== Partial stage credits ==
Year	Title	Role(s)	Venue	Notes
1959	The Taming of the Shrew	Biondello	Canadian Players Theatre, Toronto	
1962	The Hostage	IRA Officer	One Sheridan Square, New York	
1964	The Chinese Prime Minister	Red Gus Risko (understudy)	Royale Theatre, New York	
1965	Live Like Pigs	Col	Actors' Playhouse, New York	
1966–67	Eh?	Reverend Mort	Circle in the Square Downtown, New York	
1967	Twelfth Night	Sir Andrew Aguecheek	Old Globe Theatre, San Diego	
1967	Othello	Cassio	Old Globe Theatre, San Diego	
1968	The Prime of Miss Jean Brodie	Gordon Lowther	Hayes Theater, New York	
1968	The Prime of Miss Jean Brodie	Gordon Lowther	U.S. tour	
1969	The Local Stigmatic	Various	Actors' Playhouse, New York	
1969	Henry V	Archbishop of Canterbury, Fluellen	American Shakespeare Theatre, Stratford	
1969	Henry V	Archbishop of Canterbury, Fluellen	ANTA Playhouse, New York	
1970	Othello		American Shakespeare Theatre, Stratford	
1970	All's Well That Ends Well		American Shakespeare Theatre, Stratford	
1970	The Price		Olympia Theatre, Dublin	
1971	Antony and Cleopatra		American Shakespeare Theatre, Stratford	
1971	Mary Stuart	Andrew Melville	Vivian Beaumont Theater, New York	
1971	Hadrian the Seventh	Bishop of Caerleon	U.S. tour	
1972	Pantagleize	Pantagleize	Alley Theatre, Houston	
1972	There's One in Every Marriage	Gerome	Royale Theatre, New York	
1973	The Contractor	Fitzpatrick	Chelsea Theater Center, New York	
1973	Juno and the Paycock		Long Wharf Theatre, New Haven	
1973	Forget-me-not Lane		Long Wharf Theatre, New Haven	
1973	The Dance of Death	Edgar	Long Wharf Theatre, New Haven	
1974	The National Health	Barnet	Long Wharf Theatre, New Haven	
1974	Saint Joan		Ahmanson Theatre, Los Angeles	
1974	Who's Who in Hell	Sir Augustus Ludbourne	Lunt-Fontanne Theatre, New York	
1975	Savages	Alan West	Mark Taper Forum, Los Angeles	
1975	Afore Night Come	Roche	Long Wharf Theatre, New Haven	
1975	Richard III	Lord Hastings	Long Wharf Theatre, New Haven	
1975–76	The Royal Family	Herbert Dean	Kennedy Center, Washington D.C.	
1975–76	The Royal Family	Herbert Dean	Brooklyn Academy of Music, New York	
1975–76	The Royal Family	Herbert Dean	Hayes Theater, New York	
1976	Dance for Me, Simeon		Long Wharf Theatre, New Haven	As playwright
1976	Dance for Me, Simeon		George Street Playhouse, New Brunswick	As playwright
1976	Days in the Trees	Son	Circle in the Square Theatre, New York	
1977	Savages	Alan West	Hudson Guild Theatre, New York	
1977–79	Absent Friends	Paul	Long Wharf Theatre, New Haven	
1978	Black Angel	Martin	Mark Taper Forum, Los Angeles	
1978	Spokesong	Trick Cyclist	Long Wharf Theatre, New Haven	
1979	Spokesong	Trick Cyclist	Circle in the Square Theatre, New York	
1979	Night and Day	Geoffrey Carson	Kennedy Center, Washington D.C.	
1980	After the Fact/Porch		Long Wharf Theatre, New Haven	Staged reading
1981	Entertaining Mr Sloane	Ed	Cherry Lane Theatre, New York	
1981–82	Dear Daddy	Bernard	Philadelphia Drama Guild, Philadelphia	
1982	Tales from Hollywood		Mark Taper Forum, Los Angeles	
1982–83	84, Charing Cross Road	Frank Doel	Nederlander Theatre, New York	
1983	The Hostage		Long Wharf Theatre, New Haven	As director
1984	Billy Budd		Gene Dynarski Theatre, Los Angeles	
1986	Loot	Inspector Truscott	New York City Center	
1989–91	What the Butler Saw	Dr Rance	New York City Center	
1989–91	What the Butler Saw	Dr Rance	Wyndham's Theatre, London	
1989–91	What the Butler Saw	Dr Rance	Hampstead Theatre, London	
1993	An Inspector Calls	Inspector Goole	Williamstown Theatre Festival	
1995	The Entertainer	Archie Rice	Long Wharf Theatre, New Haven	
1996	Fortune's Fool		Theatre Royal, Bath	
1996	Fortune's Fool		Chichester Festival Theatre	

== Awards and nominations ==
Award	Year	Category	Work	Result
Drama Desk Award	1986	Outstanding Featured Actor in a Play	Loot	Won
Laurence Olivier Award	1991	Comedy Performance of the Year	What the Butler Saw	Nominated
Obie Award	1977	Distinguished Performance by an Actor	Savages	Won
Tony Award	1979	Best Featured Actor in a Play	Spokesong	Nominated
Tony Award	1980	Best Featured Actor in a Play	Night and Day	Nominated
Tony Award	1986	Best Featured Actor in a Play	Loot	Nominated
