= Daisy Bell =

1892 music hall song by Harry Dacre

"Daisy Bell (Bicycle Built For Two)"
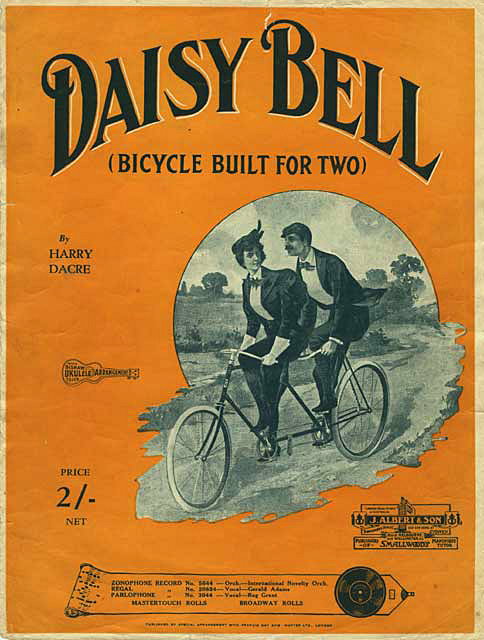

Song by Edward M. Favor
- Released: 1892
- Genre: Music hall, standard
- Songwriter: Harry Dacre

"Daisy Bell (Bicycle Built for Two)" is a song written in 1892 by British songwriter Harry Dacre with the chorus "Daisy, Daisy / Give me your answer, do. / I'm half crazy / all for the love of you," ending with the words "a bicycle built for two." The song is said to have been inspired by Daisy Greville, Countess of Warwick, one of the many mistresses of King Edward VII. It is the earliest song sung using computer speech synthesis by the IBM 7090 in 1961.

== History ==
"Daisy Bell" was composed by Harry Dacre in 1892. As David Ewen writes in American Popular Songs:

When Dacre, an English popular composer, first came to the United States, he brought with him a bicycle, for which he was charged import duty. His friend William Jerome, another songwriter, remarked lightly: "It's lucky you didn't bring a bicycle built for two, otherwise you'd have to pay double duty." Dacre was so taken with the phrase "bicycle built for two" that he soon used it in a song. That song, Daisy Bell, first became successful in a London music hall, in a performance by Katie Lawrence. Tony Pastor was the first to sing it in the United States. Its success in America began when Jennie Lindsay brought down the house with it at the Atlantic Gardens on the Bowery early in 1892.

The song was originally recorded and released by Dan W. Quinn in 1893.

Daisy Bell
Sung by Edward M. Favor. Recorded by the Edison Phonograph Company on brown wax cylinder in 1894

There is a flower within my heart, Daisy, Daisy!
Planted one day by a glancing dart,
Planted by Daisy Bell!
Whether she loves me or loves me not,
Sometimes it's hard to tell;
Yet I am longing to share the lot
Of beautiful Daisy Bell!

Chorus:
Daisy, Daisy,
Give me your answer, do!
I'm half crazy,
All for the love of you!
It won't be a stylish marriage,
I can't afford a carriage,
But you'll look sweet upon the seat
Of a bicycle built for two!

We will go "tandem" as man and wife, Daisy, Daisy!
"Pedaling" away down the road of life,
I and my Daisy Bell!
When the road's dark we can both despise
Policeman and "lamps" as well;
There are "bright lights" in the dazzling eyes
Of beautiful Daisy Bell!
(Chorus)

I will stand by you in "wheel" or woe, Daisy, Daisy!
You'll be the bell(e) which I'll ring you know!
Sweet little Daisy Bell!
You'll take the "lead" in each "trip" we take,
Then if I don't do well;
I will permit you to use the brake,
My beautiful Daisy Bell!
(Chorus)

== In technology and popular culture ==
=== Computing and technology ===
"Daisy Bell" sung by the DECtalk speech synthesizer released in 1984

- In 1961, an IBM 7090 at Bell Labs was programmed to sing "Daisy Bell". This was one of the earliest demonstrations of computer speech synthesis. This recording has been included in the United States National Recording Registry.
- In 1974, auditory researchers used the melody of "Daisy Bell" for the first demonstration of "pure dichotic" (two-ear only) perception: they encoded the melody in a stereophonic signal in such a way that it could be perceived when listening with both ears but not with either ear alone.
- In 1975, Steve Dompier, member of Homebrew Computer Club, programmed an Altair 8800 computer to play "Daisy Bell" as AM radio interference.
- In 1985, Christopher C. Capon created a Commodore 64 program named "Sing Song Serenade", which caused the Commodore 1541 floppy disk drive to emit the tune of "Daisy Bell" directly from its hardware by rapidly moving the read/write head.
- In 1999, a piece of computer software called BonziBuddy sang "Daisy Bell" if the user asked it to sing.
- Microsoft's discontinued personal assistant Cortana would sometimes sing the first line of "Daisy Bell" when asked to sing a song.
- Amazon Alexa can sing "Daisy Bell" when asked to sing a song.

=== Drama, film, and television ===
- Science-fiction author Arthur C. Clarke witnessed the IBM 7090 demonstration during a trip to Bell Labs in 1962 and referred to it in the 1968 novel and film 2001: A Space Odyssey, in which the HAL 9000 computer sings "Daisy Bell" during its gradual deactivation.
- The song is sung repeatedly in Stewart Parker and Jimmy Kennedy's play Spokesong (1975); a work which was staged in London's West End in 1977 and on Broadway in 1979.
- In the Futurama episode "Love and Rocket" (2002), Bender sings "Daisy Bell" to the Planet Express Ship when he falls in love with it. The episode contains several references to 2001: A Space Odyssey.

=== Musical recordings ===
- Dan W. Quinn produced a wax cylinder recording of "Daisy Bell" in 1893, the first recorded rendition of the song.
- Singer Dinah Shore recorded a version of the song for Bluebird Records in 1941.
- Singer Nat King Cole produced a recording of "Daisy Bell" as part of his Those Lazy-Hazy-Crazy Days of Summer LP for Capitol Records in 1961.
- On 3 May 2014, an album was released composed entirely of covers of "Daisy Bell" entitled The Gay Nineties Old Tyme Music: Daisy Bell, in conjunction with Mark Ryden's exhibit "The Gay 90s". The album features covers of "Daisy Bell" by Katy Perry, Tyler, the Creator, "Weird Al" Yankovic, Nick Cave, Kirk Hammett of Metallica, Mark Mothersbaugh of Devo, Wall of Voodoo's Stan Ridgway, Danny Elfman, and others. Profits from the album went to the nonprofit Little Kids Rock.

=== Radio ===
- The tune was played as the lead-in to Aunt Daisy's radio broadcasts in New Zealand, which ran from 1930 until her death in 1963.
