= Santiago Pozo =

American film producer

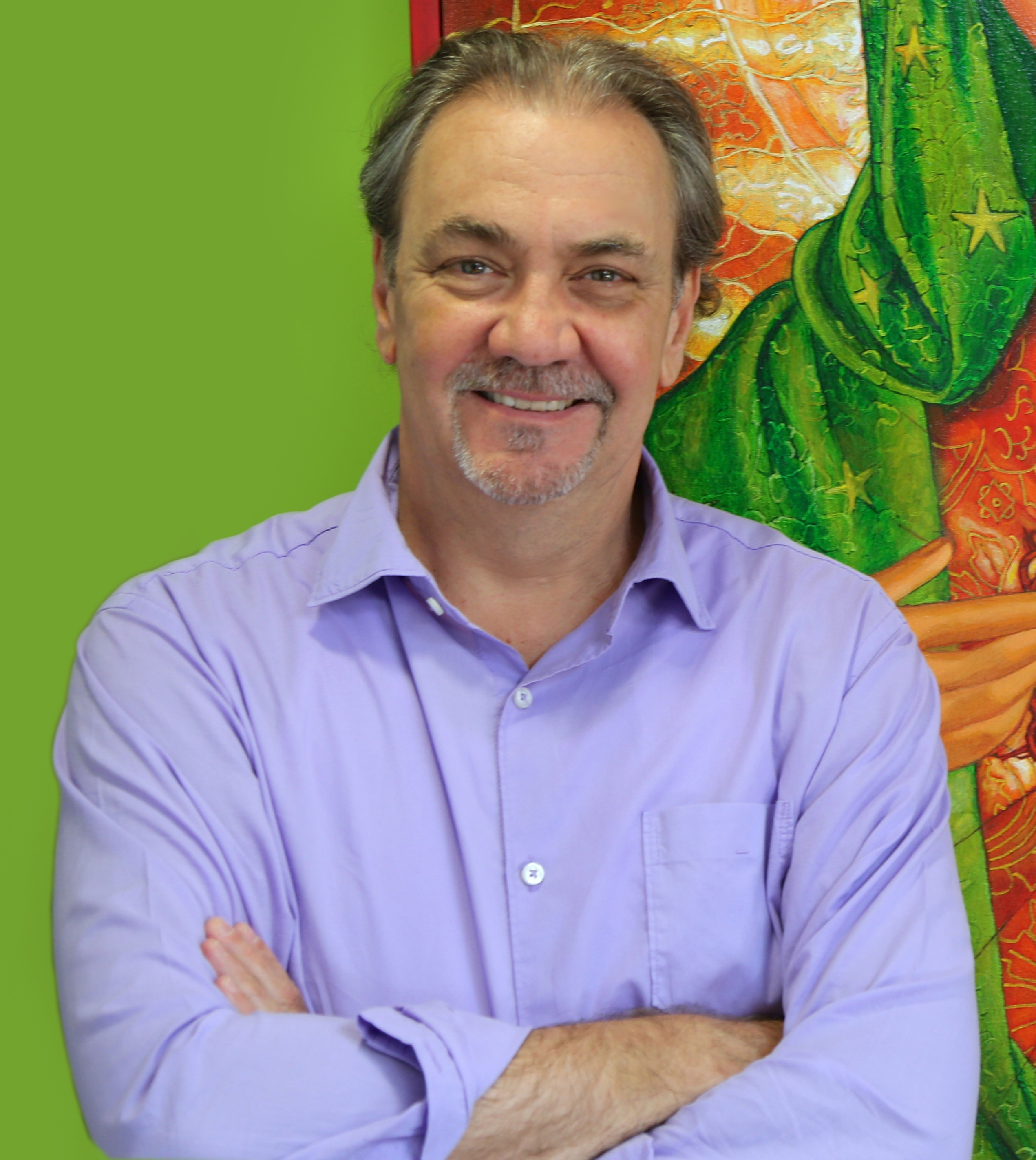
Santiago Pozo

Santiago Pozo Arenas (born 1957) is a marketing executive, producer, screenwriter and film director. He is the founder and owner of Arenas Group and Arenas Entertainment from 1988 to 2019, the year in which he sells the marketing and publicity divisions to the agency D2H. He is a member of The Academy of Motion Picture Arts and Sciences of Hollywood, the Academia de las Artes y las Ciencias Cinematográficas de España, the Board of Trustees of Nebrija University and in the mid-eighties he was freelance to the Spanish newspaper El País in Los Angeles.

Over 35 years in the industry, he has worked on the North American marketing campaigns of more than 300 films, including The Milagro Beanfield War, Old Gringo, Born in East L.A., Like Water for Chocolate, Shrek, My Family, Selena, Apocalypto, The Book of Life, American Sniper, Dawn of the Planet of the Apes, Transformers, The Avengers, Toy Story 3 and Toy Story 4, Star Trek, Madagascar, Annabelle, Son of God, Beverly Hills Chihuahua, Logan, Cruella and Free Guy.

As a producer and distributor, he worked on films such as Imagining Argentina, with Antonio Banderas and Emma Thompson; Empire, with John Leguizamo; The 3 Wise Men; Culture Clash in AmeriCCa directed by Emilio Estevez; Nicotina with Diego Luna; and the adaptation of the classic Rudolfo Anaya Bless Me, Ultima, the first Hispanic novel written in the United States. As a screenwriter, Pozo, together with Gregory Small, wrote The Run, that MGM acquired an option in 2021. Pozo and Small also developed an adaptation of Paulo Coelho's novel The Valkyries..

Pozo is considered the pioneer of marketing film and television to the U.S. Hispanic audiences.

== Life ==
=== Early years ===
Santiago Pozo was born in 1957 in Santo Domingo de la Calzada, La Rioja, Spain. He grew up in Madrid, where his father had a "mantequeria", a bakery/convenience store. He showed interest in cinema from a very young age thanks to the free tickets the neighborhood theater gave his father in exchange for hanging the poster of the weekly double session in the family store.

He began working in the cinema at the Elias Querejeta’s production company as a P.A. in the Jaime Chávarri’s film A un Dios desconocido. In 1980, Pozo wrote and directed one of the chapters of The First Meters, also produced by Elias Querejeta.

=== Relocate to the US and work in Universal Pictures ===
He emigrated to Los Angeles in 1982, without speaking English. His first job is to clean buildings, experience that allows him to come into contact with the Hispanic immigrants of the city and that will help him develop the instinct for communication with the Hispanic population. José Luis Borau, a Spanish director working in Los Angeles preparing the production of his film On the Line/Rio Abajo in California and Texas, hired him as his assistant and became Production Coordinator.

In 1984, having received a Fulbright Program scholarship from the Spanish-North American Permanent Committee, Pozo enrolled in the Peter Stark Producing Program at The University of Southern California Cinema School, becoming the first Spaniard accepted into the prestigious Program and one of the first Europeans. The Master focus on the financial, marketing and creative aspects of the film industry. In 1985 Pozo, as an intern at Universal Pictures, convinced Michele Reese, the EVP of Marketing to do a test market using Spanish dubbed prints of E.T. for the re-release celebrating the 5th anniversary of one of Universal's biggest hits. Pozo booked a dubbed Spanish print at the Orpheum Cinema in downtown Los Angeles. The theater, regardless of being a discount house and having half-price tickets, delivered the highest-grossing theater in the entire United States. Because of this success Universal Pictures created the first multicultural marketing department for any Studio in Hollywood dedicated to the ethnic markets with particular emphasis in the US Hispanic market, and offered Pozo to direct it.

=== Foundation and development of Arenas ===
In 1987, Pozo resigned from Universal Studios and founded Arenas Group, a film marketing company. His first client was Robert Redford, for whom he marketed the film The Milagro Beanfield War.

During the following years, he worked on numerous campaigns for major studio and independent releases, including Universal, Disney, DreamWorks, Columbia Pictures, Warner Bros, Paramount Pictures, TriStar, New Line, Paramount etc. In 1997, Arenas does the marketing campaign for the release of Selena (film) the film that made Jennifer Lopez a star, and consolidates the importance of the Hispanic U.S. market for Hollywood.

In 2001, Pozo returned to Universal Pictures, where he and the investment fund Marco Polo Investments formed Arenas Entertainment. Arenas' mission was to acquire, produce and distribute films targeting the US Hispanic market.

Arenas’ first film was Empire, 2002, with John Leguizamo, Peter Sarsgaard and Denisse Richards. Arenas has also produced and distributed such films as Imagining Argentina with Antonio Banderas and Emma Thompson; Nicotina with Diego Luna, The 3 Wise Men, with the voices of Martin Sheen, Emilio Estevez and Jose Luis Rodriguez (singer) and Culture Clash in AmeriCCa, directed by Emilio Estevez.

== Activism and Defense of the Hispanic Culture ==
In 2001, Pozo successfully lobbied the City of Los Angeles to add the Spanish language tilde (Ñ) to street signs where required.

A statue of Christopher Columbus in Los Angeles's Grand Park was removed in 2018. Pozo spoke out against its removal.

Likewise, Pozo has spoken about the under-representation of Latino talent and executives within Hollywood and has published numerous articles and participated in demonstrations demanding to increase the participation of Latinos in the Academy Awards.

In 2026, Pozo served as an executive producer of We the Hispanos, a documentary film by José Luis López-Linares highlighting the Hispanic heritage of the United States.

== Awards and recognitions ==
In recognition of his accomplishments, Pozo has received many awards and honors during his career. In 2009, he was the first recipient of the “Outstanding Marketing in Film and Television Impact Award” presented by The National Hispanic Media Coalition.

In 2007, The Imagen Foundation honored him with its award “For Powerful and Influential Latinos.”

In 2005, he was presented with the “Minorities in Business Magazine Prism Award” for outstanding contributions to the entertainment industry.

The “Nosotros Golden Eagle Entrepreneur of the Year Award” was presented to him in 2004.

For his contribution to Arts and Sciences, the prestigious “Premio Riojano del Mundo” was given to him by the government of La Rioja, Spain and the newspaper EL MUNDO.

In 2003, Pozo was chosen by Hispanic Business Magazine as an Entrepreneur of the Year Finalist as well as one of their 100 Most Influential Hispanics. And, in 2007, The Hollywood Reporter named Pozo as the 7th most influential Latino in Hollywood.

== Filmography ==
=== Producer ===
- The Last Harvest (1991) (executive producer)
- Empire (2002)
- Imagining Argentina (2003)
- Culture Clash in AmeriCCa (2005) (executive producer)
- We the Hispanos (2026) (executive producer)

=== Director ===
- Los Primeros Metros (1980)
- Un Reino Sin Fronteras (2014)

=== Writer ===
- Los Primeros Metros (1980), producer Elias Querejeta.
- Un Reino Sin Fronteras (2014)
- The Run (2019) (in development)

=== Other Credits ===
- On The Line (Rio Abajo) (1984)
