= February Shadows =

1984 novel by Elisabeth Reichart

- First edition (Austrian)
- Author: Elisabeth Reichart
- Original title: Februarschatten
- Cover artist: Georg Eisler
- Language: German
- Genre: Historical novel; Psychological novel
- Publisher: Adriadne Press
- Publication date: 1984
- Publication place: Austria
- Media type: Print (Paperback)
- Pages: 162
- ISBN: 0-929497-02-3 (second edition, paperback)
- Followed by: Komm über den See (Come across the Lake)

February Shadows (German: Februarschatten) is a 1984 historical novel by award-winning Austrian author Elisabeth Reichart. She wrote it as a response to her discovery of the Mühlviertler Hasenjagd ("rabbit hunt of the Mühlviertel region"), a massacre on 2 February 1945 at the Mauthausen-Gusen concentration camp in Upper Austria. In the Mühlviertler Hasenjagd, the civilian inhabitants of the Mühlviertel hunted down and killed almost 500 prisoners, including men, women and children, who escaped from Special Barracks Number 20.

February Shadows tells the story of this hunt, and its repercussions, through the eyes of a young Austrian girl named Hilde. The story combines real time narrative and flashbacks: the adult Hilde recounts the story to her adult daughter, Erica. In an inner monologue, Hilde struggles with her traumatic past and scarred present. Erica's insistent questions force her mother to confront her own suppressed memories of the event.

The narrative use of fragmented sentences and stream of consciousness does not conform to the rules of traditional grammar or sentence structure. These methods encourage the reader to better understand the psyche and experiences of the protagonist. The timing of the publication is significant: during the 1980s, Austria's younger generation was trying to come to grips with their country's Nazi past. The story of a February hidden in shadows—February Shadows—forces the readers, most of whom would be Austrians, to relieve the experience of that February and thus remember a past that most Austrians wanted to suppress. In this way, it is both a culturally revealing and politically charged story.

== Background ==
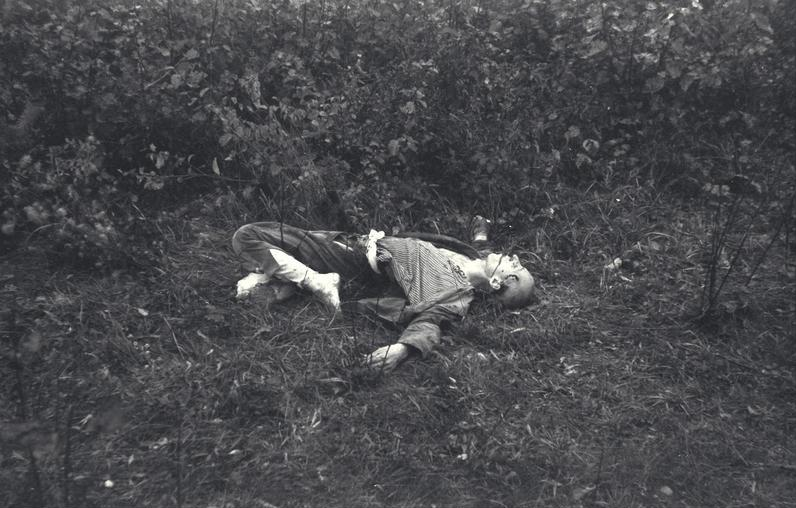
Prisoner shot dead at Mauthausen-Gusen concentration camp

=== The massacre ===
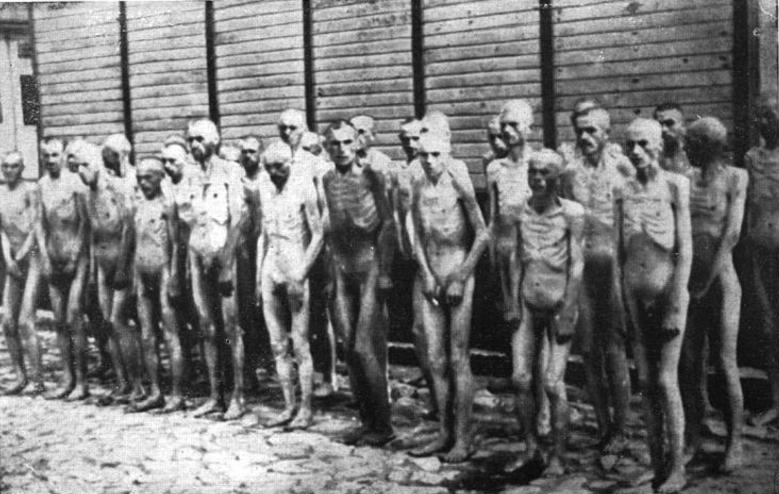
Russian prisoners of war held in a concentration camp. The 500 prisoners to escape from Mauthausen-Gusen concentration camp during Mühlviertler Hasenjagd were in similar condition.

The Mühlviertler Hasenjagd took place on 2 February 1945. An estimated 500 prisoners escaped from Special Barracks Number 20 of the Mauthausen-Gusen concentration camp. The prisoners in these barracks were considered to be intellectual Soviet officers held for fear of revolt against the National Socialists of Germany. When the alarm in nearby Mühlviertel sounded, all citizens were instructed by members of the Austrian National Socialist Party (who were under the jurisdiction of the Nazi Party) to hunt down the escaped prisoners despite their age or gender. A large massacre took place in which nearly all of the prisoners were captured and murdered by either Nazi officers or the civilians themselves. There were only seventeen known survivors.

Reichart never learned of the event until her grandmother conveyed it to her as an adult. Her shock at the hidden, unspoken tragedy initially compelled her to begin research about the Mühlviertler Hasenjagd. At this time, the Austrian government had developed renewed interest in Austria's role during World War II while Reichart had begun to explore the controversy of Austria's complicity in the Nazi era atrocities.

== Plot ==
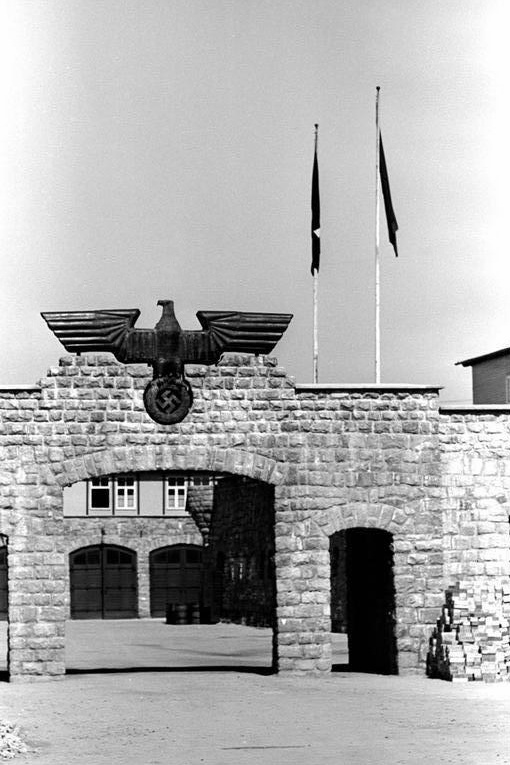
Mauthausen-Gusen concentration camp

The story begins with Hilde, an elderly woman, awaking in the middle of the night to the sound of her telephone ringing. Upon answering she discovers that her husband, Anton, who was staying at a nursing facility for a severe illness, has died. His death triggers feelings of loneliness and abandonment along with painful memories of the death of her older brother, Hannes, who died during World War II, sending Hilde into a state of panic and despair.

Each day Hilde visits Anton's grave mentally talking to him as if he is still alive. One evening, as she is returning home, Hilde discovers that a black cat seems to be following her. The cat causes her to remember two distinct experiences from her past. The first is a memory from when she was a small child and had attempted to hide a stray cat in her bedroom. Her family was very poor and could not afford a pet, but she saved her table scraps for it anyway. One day as she was coming home, her father met her drunk in the doorway. After telling her he had snapped the cat's neck, he beat her harshly with a fly swatter. This first memory seeped into the second: her daughter, Erika, begging to keep a stray cat she had found. Anton had granted her wish, but the cat ruined the neighbors' gardens and Hilde was forced to drown it in the river.

The following day, Mr. Funk, a friend of her late husband, appears at her door and pressures Hilde to join the Retiree's Union. She joins because Anton had been a member of the Austrian Socialist Party and he would have approved of her socializing with other members. Hilde assures Mr. Funk that she will attend the next evening social. Mr. Funk's visit forces another memory to resurface. She remembers her daughter asking what party Anton had belonged to during the period of National Socialism; Hilde recalled him being part of the Hitler Youth. The reader also discovers that Hilde's brother, Hannes, was killed by the Nazi Party. Erika's insolence upsets Hilde greatly.

Soon after, Erika calls her mother, stating that she will be coming to visit. Erika also grieves her father's death. Hilde becomes impatient with Erika, hinting at the contradictory nature of their relationship. Hilde wants to be with her daughter, yet she feels as if her daughter is a total stranger. Erika acts boldly and actively pursues her career as a writer. Hilde believes the only reason Erika wishes to come home is to get information for her book, which is true. Hilde is angry at her daughter for forcing her to relive her past experiences; her childhood was full of poverty, loneliness, and shame. Anton had been her way out of the past, and she only wants to move forward.

Hilde attends the Retiree's Union social pretending to be happy. She watches the dancers on the dance floor and mourns the absence of her husband. The dancers trigger another memory from her childhood: she sees her father kicking her mother on the dance floor and she runs out to help. Soon, both Hilde and her mother are being beaten on the ground, her father will not let them comfort each other. The only person she can turn to is her brother, Hannes, who comforts her. The memory is too painful for Hilde and she leaves the social immediately.

The state of Upper Austria in relation to the country.

Erika arrives the next day and announces that they will take a trip to the village so she can obtain more information for her book. (The reader must assume that the village is in the Mühlviertel.) Hilde does not wish to go, yet does not want to be excluded. As they enter the village, Hilde recalls working hard in the fields to harvest the crop left behind by farmers to have enough food for their large family. She remembers the hunger pangs and how her father could not find work. She remembers Fritzi, a member of her apartment-style household, bringing eggs and bacon on Sundays from the farmers and how she had felt proud carrying the basket into the kitchen. She had wanted her mother to be more proud of her than she was of her older and prettier sister, Monika.

Hilde sees the lifeless and leafless pear tree in the village. She refers to it as the "February Tree", the tree on which Hannes was hanged. She remembers a Nazi in a black uniform telling her at school that her brother was dead. She remembers running through the snow and losing one wooden shoe in an attempt to save him. She remembers discovering he truly was dead and lying in the snow, hoping for her own death. Hilde and Erika visit her old house and she recalls beatings; they then visit the pond where she is reminded of the many loads of laundry she was forced to wash with her mother. She begrudged the freedom of her brothers who were not forced to do work, her oldest sister, Renate, who lived with their grandparents, and her delicate sister, Monika, who was never asked to manage hard labor. They walk down the lane to the old school lined with apple trees; she recalls the rough feeling of cobblestones on her sore feet and the bitter taste of the small apples. She evades a certain barn on the lane and avoids looking out into the distance towards the area which was once the site of Mauthausen-Gusen concentration camp.

Upon returning to their hotel room, Hilde reflects on her daughter. Her inner thoughts display envy toward Erika's privilege of being educated and her ability to choose her career. Hilde reveals that she had always wanted to be a nurse, however her dreams of a nursing career were shattered the day her village was bombed during air raids. She had watched her brother Stephen die as she was swallowed by mounds of earth. The raid had made her weak and incapable of dealing with trauma later in her life.

During their stay in the Mühlviertel, Erika is able to extract information about the fateful day in February that Hilde had been pushing from her memory for many years. Hilde relays that in the middle of the night she and her siblings were awakened by the sound of sirens. Her parents and the other tenants of her home were forced to stand for a roll call in which Pesendorfer, the Nazi authority in their house, told the tenants that many Russian convicts had escaped from the nearby concentration camp. He explained that it was their duty to Germany to find and kill each one of these convicts. Hilde, being a young girl, is told to stay at the house. However, she is worried about protecting her brother Hannes, who, like her other brothers, is forced to search for prisoners, and sneaks away to find him.

In her search for her brother, Hilde comes across the barn near her schoolhouse. She enters it, only to find Pesendorfer, her neighbor Mrs. Emmerich, and her brother Walter all violently killing prisoners. She runs home and finds Hannes, who informs her that he has hidden a prisoner in his wardrobe and that she must remain silent about it.

The next morning the villagers attend church to commemorate Candlemas. The hunters seek purification and are urged by their pastor to side with Germany and continue the search for the prisoners. At this insistence Hilde finds herself telling Hannes' secret to her mother. The story is vague about how this information is relayed to Pesendorfer, but, he finds and kills the prisoner, then takes Hannes away to beat him for his misconduct. Hilde recalls cleaning the blood from her brother's face after the beating. The following day, she finds that Hannes has been hanged for his actions. Her guilt in the causation of two deaths is evident through her narration.

Back in the present, Erika is stunned by the horrific story and deeply regrets forcing her mother to relive the event. The novel closes with the image of the mother and daughter driving away from the Mühlviertel, with Hilde at the wheel and her foot on the gas pedal.

== Major themes ==
=== Psychological effects of Mühlviertler Hasenjagd ===
February Shadows can be categorized as a psychological novel. The entire narration is told through first person stream of consciousness, and the plot builds through the unearthing of new memories as they emerge in Hilde's mind. The story is told in a mix of past and present and the narration switches fluidly back and forth between the two. The manner of the flashbacks and the inner comments Hilde makes about each informs the reader that she wishes to repress the horrific memories of 2 February 1945. Hilde constantly reminds herself to forget the past as if her survival and sanity depended on doing so.

Guilt has a great impact on Hilde throughout her life. She feels extreme guilt about the night of the Mühlviertler Hasenjagd and remains haunted by Hannes' words throughout her adulthood. He had said, "'Everyone who doesn't do something against this manhunt makes himself GUILTY.'" Not only through omission does she feel regret for the massacre, but she holds herself personally responsible for the deaths of the escaped prisoner and of her favorite brother, Hannes. Her guilt plagues her throughout the novel.

Critic Donna Hoffmeister describes Hilde's psychology as coerced, shaped by the patriarchal fascist belief system of the time. She was made to feel inferior and submissive, but also encouraged to never exclude herself from a group. This personal type of fascism aided in the rally of Austrian youth to support the Nazi cause during the Mühlviertler Hasenjagd. Many years after the period of National Socialism, it was still difficult for Hilde to extricate herself from this pattern of thinking. As an adult, she still felt extreme anxiety about being excluded from groups and events.

=== Dysfunctional family life ===
Family, or lack thereof, remains important throughout both Hilde's childhood and adulthood. Hilde's childhood is laden with abuse and patriarchal superiority. This is represented by her father's harmful actions and her mother's unwillingness to ask her brothers to do housework. In the ideal fascist society the family unit mimicked the hierarchical structure of the state. In Hilde's case, the state was stronger and more stable than her own family unit. This is evident at the climax of the novel, when she is having an inner struggle about choosing to do what was right by Germany's standards or by Hannes' standards. In the end she chose Germany's — her family life was too weak and dysfunctional to stand up to the beliefs instilled by the state and the only morals she was aware of were state-taught.

Though her married life was much better than her childhood, there was still an aspect of inhibition in Hilde's ability to function as a normal family member. Hilde resented the constant feeling of being excluded, thinking her husband and daughter were purposefully leaving her out of conversations because she was less educated than they were.

=== The mother-daughter relationship ===
Throughout the story, the mother-daughter relationship between Hilde and Erika is complex. The first point of tension between the women is the generation difference. Erika comes from an educated generation that is encouraged to ask questions and find truth, while Hilde was taught to never question authority or rules. Erika is taught to be active and bold; Hilde was taught to be passive and demure. There is much misunderstanding from the differences in their ages and histories. Also, Hilde is extremely envious of Erika's education and opportunities, causing a rift between mother and daughter. Hilde dislikes the fact that Erika has used her education to become a mere writer.

Erika is demanding towards Hilde in wanting answers; Hilde is her daughter's only tie to personal history. Erika can not discover her heritage without the aid of her mother, yet her mother wants to forget her painful past and move on to a better future. Erika seems fascinated with the past and the liberation of the female voice while Hilde is engrossed with silencing herself and moving forward.

=== Use of the word "shadows" ===
The persistent use of the word "shadow" stems from the original text. In German, the word refers to a specific type of shadow only cast in February due to the position of the earth and sun at that time of the year. The shadows of February are more defined, as was the evil of the villagers on 2 February 1945. Hilde often uses shadows in reference to shameful or painful events, people, and memories. Shadows seem to be fitting to the nature of the novel since Hilde is always attempting to escape the shadowy pain of her past.

Using the idea of shadows, a major theme that received considerable notice by the academic public was the literal liberation of the young female voice during the Hasenjagd and, consequently, during the war. Reichart allowed the reader to see into the mind of a tormented, silenced girl, thus freeing her voice. Through Reichart's book, the Austrian readers could feel they were making a positive and progressive movement in history by becoming aware of the tragedy of the war, and accepting their place and major faults in it.

== Style ==
=== Literary techniques ===
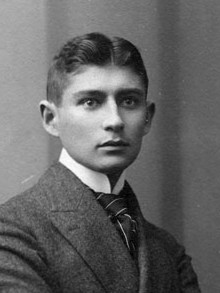
Reichart uses sentence structure similar to that of Franz Kafka. Both authors utilize fragmented and run-on sentences to create emotions in their works.

February Shadows contains several non-traditional literary devices that became popular in Austrian literature in the 1980s in novels that dealt with subject matter relating to World War II, and especially Austria's participation in the war. Reichart utilizes these unconventional devices to illustrate Hilde's denial of pain and her struggle to remain emotionally stable. The use of fragmented sentences allows the reader to understand Hilde's inability and refusal to connect one idea to another as she attempts to repress memories. The truncated thoughts represented by the short and incomplete sentences display her own prohibition to remember the past coherently. Even Reichart's incorrect punctuation enhances the emotions of the story. Reichart often places periods in the middle of sentences, creating sharp and abrupt stops to ideas, as if Hilde is trying to smother her own thoughts. Reichart also ends interrogatives without question marks as if Hilde is hopelessly inquiring and does not expect to receive an answer.

The plot follows a non-sequential structure; it switches from past memories to present experiences, and often entangles the two. This meshing of memory with sensation creates confusion between past and present, in which no details are concrete. Words and phrases are repeated throughout the book, highlighting themes and recurring ideas. This redundancy generates a sense of obsession throughout the narrative, Erika's obsession to learn the truth, and Hilde's obsession to forget it. Coupled with repetition, Reichart's use of recurring words—such as alone, exclusion, and guilt—emphasize their importance to the main points and the extreme feelings Hilde feels about them.

Throughout the novel Hilde will often not refer to herself in the first person, but insists on using the third person, or she speaks without using a noun or pronoun. This relates to her self-loathing and her unwillingness to see herself honestly for fear of who she really is. Similar to the disuse of the pronoun "I", Hilde also does not allow herself to use the word "my" in reference to her parents, husband, and daughter. She inserts an impersonal "the" in its place. For example, she does not say "my" mother, but "the" mother. In the original Austrian text the use of the impersonal article was meant to show estrangement between Hilde and her family, and Reichart asked that the English translation retain the article even though it did not translate directly.

The overall effect of Reichart's literary techniques indicate Hilde's estrangement of painful memories, her obsession with guilt and self-loathing, her inability to resolve anxiety, and the inadequacy of words to capture her feelings. With these devices, Reichart allows the reader to see inside the mind of an extremely disturbed woman. For Reichart, Hilde and her siblings embody the war-time generation: Walter, who helped to hack to death the prisoners in the barn; Monika, who was too delicate and fragile to act; Hannes, who refused to kill the prisoner and tried to save him; and Hilde, who was confused and did not know to whom she could go for help. The father, a violent and bitter man, made his family suffer and was indeed complicit in their suffering; the mother, worked hard but said nothing; the distant sister, Christine, was removed from the chaos. The home was no sanctuary, not for the escaped prisoner, nor for Hilde; Pesendorf betrayed the brother—indeed, the family—and killed the prisoner. The home was as dangerous and bloody as the barn.

=== Elements of the psychological novel ===
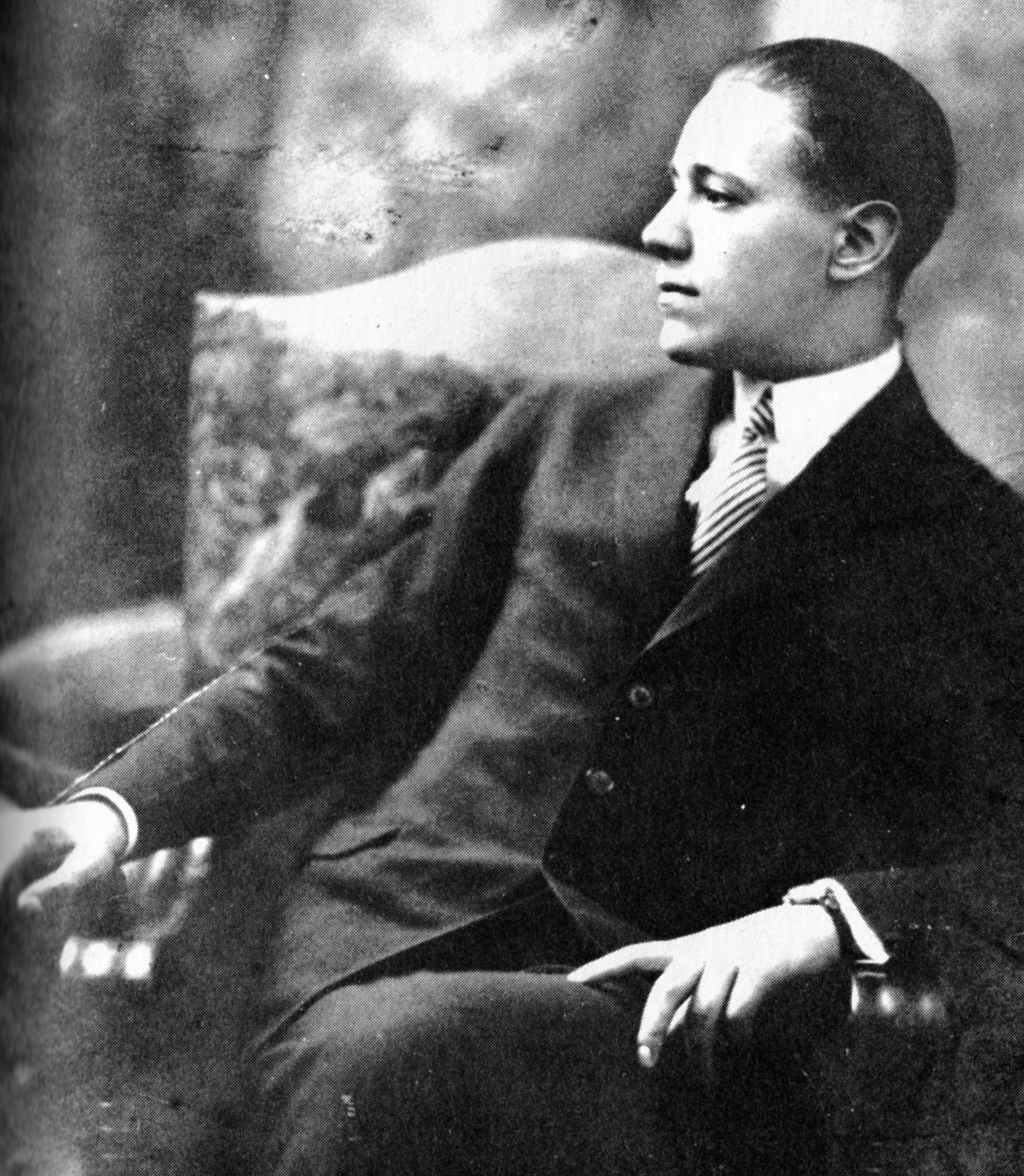
Odon von Horvath became famous for bringing to light societal atrocities in the early 1900s. February Shadows can also be categorized as a novel aimed to create societal guilt.

Three major elements of the writing style indicate that the book can be classified as a psychological novel. The first is the emphasis of the mind and inner thoughts rather than the plot line and movement of the story. The feelings behind all actions chosen are far more important than the actions themselves; the actions are mere secondary behaviors in response to the psychological decisions of the character. Another element is the stream of consciousness, or inner monologue style of writing. The majority of the storyline takes place in the mind of the lead character rather than externally through actions and interactions with other characters. In addition to inner monologues, memories of dialogues or even imagined dialogues with other important characters aid in plot movement. The final element is the use of a non-chronological timeline and excessive flashbacks. The effect allows the reader to follow the character thought by thought through memories, feelings, and contemplations, thus creating the illusion that the reader is inside the character's mind, rather than a third party observer, as in classical novels.

=== Similar authors ===
Reichart utilizes techniques in her novel that are similar to other Austrian authors from both the early 20th century and the early 1980s. Similar to Franz Kafka, Reichart employs alternating run-on and fragmented sentences to display the emotions of her character, and also creates a poignant plot by using ambiguous words which could potentially possess multiple meanings in the text. Like Ödön von Horváth, Reichart has the ability to uproot and publicly display difficult events through dramatized means. In the novels authored by Peter Handke, the use of extreme psychological activity drives the plot, which is also congruent with Reichart's novel. Her use of key themes and phrases which represent innate emotional processes can also be seen in the writings of one of her famous contemporaries, Thomas Bernhard.

== Publication history ==
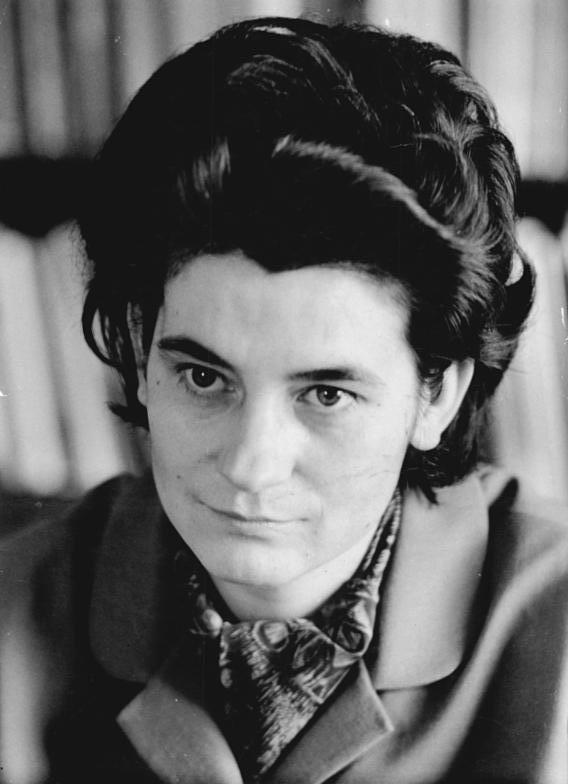
Christa Wolf wrote an afterword for the 1985 reissued edition

Februarschatten was originally written in the German language and was first printed by Verlag der Österreichischen Staatsdrückerei in Vienna in 1984. It was reissued by Aufbau Verlag in Berlin by 1985, when the afterword by Christa Wolf was added. The English version, February Shadows, translated by Donna L. Hoffmeister, was published in 1989, with a translator's commentary at the end of the book to aid English speakers' understanding of certain language and context. Ariadne Press in Riverside, California, published the English version and Georg Eisler designed the cover art.

=== About the afterword ===
The afterword of the novel was written by Christa Wolf, a famous German literary critic and writer known for such works as Der geteilte Himmel (Divided Heaven, 1963), Kindheitsmuster (Patterns of Childhood, 1976), and Was bleibt (What Remains, 1990). Wolf gives a brief background of Reichart's discovery of the Mühlviertler Hasenjagd and her own interpretation of the story. She praises two main themes, the struggle of silence, and the liberation of the female voice through psychological writing. Wolf also notifies the reader of consistent symbolism throughout the book and its application to reality.

== Reception ==
The novel was received well by young Austrians in the 1980s. To them, the book represented a story of truth that was long hidden. At a time when Austria was starting to take on responsibility for its nonaction during World War II, February Shadows threw light on problems of the past. Reichart displayed to her own nation that ignoring and forgetting events such as the Mühlviertler Hasenjagd was unacceptable and not to be tolerated. Some older Austrians, who had lived through the war, considered February Shadows controversial and inappropriate. Much like the character Hilde, they felt the past should stay in the past, that there was a reason for Austrian silence about the events of World War II: to protect lives.

== Sources ==
=== Bibliography ===
- "Christa Wolf." FemBio. April 19, 2010.
- DeMeritt, Linda. "The Art of Confronting Taboos." Department of Modern and Classical Languages of Allegheny College. 2000.
- "Elisabeth Reichart- February Shadows." Studies in Austrian Literature, Culture, and Thought. Ariadne Press. 2004.
- Hoffmeister, Donna L. "Commentary." February Shadows. Riverside: Ariadne Press, 1989.
- Hornek, Daniel. "Franz Kafka Biography." Franz Kafka Website. 1999.
- Killough, Mary Klein. "Freud's Vienna, Then and Now: The Problem of Austrian Identity. " Blue Ridge Torch Club. 2006.
- Michaels, Jennifer E. "Breaking the Silence: Elisabeth Reichart's Protest against the Denial of the Nazi past in Austria." German Studies Review. Vol. 19, No. 1 (1996): pp. 9–27. JSTOR. German Studies Association. March 31, 2010.
- "Odon von Horvath." Moonstruck Drama. 19 April 2010.
- "Peter Handke." Encyclopædia Britannica. 2010. Encyclopædia Britannica Online. 19 April 2010.
- "Psychological Novel." Encyclopædia Britannica. 2010. Encyclopædia Britannica Online. 19 April 2010.
- Reichart, Elisabeth. February Shadows. Riverside: Ariadne Press, 1989.
- "Thomas Bernhard." Encyclopædia Britannica. 2010. Encyclopædia Britannica Online. 19 April 2010.
- Thornton, Dan Franklin. "Dualities: Myth and the unreconciled past in Austrian and Dutch literature of the 1980s." Ph.D. dissertation, The University of North Carolina at Chapel Hill, United States—North Carolina. Proquest. Publication No. AAT 9968684. March 31, 2010.
- Wolf, Christa. "Afterword." February Shadows. Riverside: Ariadne Press, 1989.
