= Spokesong =

Stage play with music

Spokesong, or The Common Wheel, usually shortened to Spokesong, is a play with music. It uses a script and lyrics by Stewart Parker and music by Jimmy Kennedy. The song "Daisy Bell" by Harry Dacre is also sung numerous times during the show. While labeled as a play, theatre scholar Thomas Hischak asserts that this work is difficult to categorize; writing "it was almost a musical, yet it used the songs in a very Brechtian manner". It premiered at the Dublin Theatre Festival in 1975, and was subsequently staged in the West End in London in 1977 and on Broadway in 1979. Parker won the 1976 Standard Theatre Award for Most Promising Playwright for his work on Spokesong. Actor Joseph Maher was nominated for a Tony Award for his performance as The Trick Cyclist in the New York production.

== Plot ==
Spokesong is set in two time periods. The first time period is 1970s Belfast, which focuses on the character of Frank who runs a bicycle shop founded long ago by his dead grandparents. This time period has a central love triangle between Frank, his girlfriend (the schoolteacher Daisy), and his half-brother (the leftist journalist Julian). Frank believes that the problems of the world he lives in are all connected to the automobile and that if man would return to exclusively using the bicycle to travel the world would be a better place. The second time period takes place 80 years in the past and is focused on Frank's grandparents, Francis and Kitty, while they are young. The Trick Cyclist floats between both time periods and acts as a master of ceremonies.

== Songs ==
Songs are by Parker and Kennedy unless indicated otherwise.
Act 1

- "Daisy Bell" by Harry Dacre (sung by The Trick Cyclist and the company)
- "Daisy Bell" reprise (sung by Frank)
- "The Parlor Song" (sung by Francis)
- "The Cocktail Song" (sung by The Trick Cyclist)
- "The Cowboy Song" (sung by The Trick Cyclist)
- "Daisy Bell" reprise (sung by The Trick Cyclist and the company)

Act 2

- "The Music Hall Song" (sung by Frank and The Trick Cyclist)
- "The Parlor Song" reprise (sung by The Trick Cyclist)
- "The Army Song" (sung by The Trick Cyclist)
- "The Spinning Song" (sung by Frank; lyrics by Madelyne Bridges)
- "The Army Song" reprise (sung by The Trick Cyclist)
- "The Anthem" (sung by Francis and Kitty)
- "Daisy Bell" reprise (sung by The Trick Cyclist and Julian)

== Performance history ==
Spokesong was first performed at the 1975 Dublin Theatre Festival with Pitt Wilkinson as The Trick Cyclist and Raymond Hardie as Frank. In 1976 it was staged in London at the King's Head Theatre before transferring to the West End. This production was directed by Robert Gillespie and opened on 16 February 1977 at the West End's Vaudeville Theatre, where it ran for four and a half weeks. It starred Niall Buggy as Frank, Annabel Leventon as Daisy Bell, Don MacIver as Julian, Patrick Waldron as Francis, Valerie Hermanni as Kitty, and Robert Bridges as The Trick Cyclist.

Spokesong was given its United States premiere at the Long Wharf Theatre on 2 February 1978. A year later, it opened on Broadway at the Circle in the Square Theatre (CST) for preview performances on 24 February 1979. It officially opened on 15 March 1979; running until 20 May 1979, for a total of 77 performances. It was never intended to have a long run and was one of four planned limited engagement runs at the CST that season.

Both the Long Wharf and Broadway productions starred John Lithgow as Frank, Virginia Vestoff as Daisy, Joseph Maher as The Trick Cyclist, Josef Sommer as Francis, Maria Tucci as Kitty, and John Horton as Julian. Maher was nominated for the Tony Award for Best Featured Actor in a Play at the 33rd Tony Awards. The Broadway production used sets designed by Marjorie B. Kellogg.

In the 1978–79 season the play was also performed at the Royal Manitoba Theatre Centre in Canada, and by Ensemble Theatre in Sydney, Australia; the latter with Rosalind Speirs as Daisy. In 1982 it was staged at the Oregon Shakespeare Festival, and in 1989 it was performed at the Lyric Theatre, Belfast with Sean Caffrey. The play was first published by Samuel French, Inc. in 1980, and subsequently in an anthology of plays by Bloomsbury Academic.

== Awards and nominations ==
=== Original Broadway production ===
Year	Award	Category	Nominee	Result
1979	Tony Award	Best Featured Actor in a Play	Joseph Maher	Nominated
