= Imagining Argentina (film) =

- Theatrical release film poster
- Directed by: Christopher Hampton
- Screenplay by: Christopher Hampton
- Based on: Imagining Argentina by Lawrence Thornton
- Produced by: Michael Peyser; Diane Sillan; Santiago Pozo; Geoffrey C. Lands
- Starring: Antonio Banderas; Emma Thompson; Leticia Dolera; Maria Canals; Rubén Blades
- Cinematography: Guillermo Navarro
- Edited by: George Akers
- Music by: George Fenton
- Production companies: Multivideo; Arenas Entertainment; Myriad Pictures; Green Moon Productions; Imagining Argentina Productions Ltd. Mike's Movies; Tide Rock Entertainment
- Distributed by: Arenas Entertainment (United States); Manga Films (Spain); Universal Pictures (Argentina and United Kingdom, through United International Pictures)
- Release date: 12 September 2003
- Running time: 107 minutes
- Countries: Spain; United Kingdom; United States
- Language: English
- Box office: $383,106

Imagining Argentina is a 2003 drama historical film written and directed by British playwright Christopher Hampton and starring Antonio Banderas, Emma Thompson, Leticia Dolera and Rubén Blades. It is based on the award-winning eponymous 1987 novel by American writer Lawrence Thornton. It was nominated for the Golden Lion at the 2003 Venice Film Festival.

The film is centered on a couple living through the oppressive last military dictatorship in Argentina (1976-1983) and the Dirty War it conducted. Graphic images of suffering, such as rape and torture, are depicted. The closing caption states that a total of nearly 30,000 Argentines were "disappeared" through this period. The film was a joint USA/Argentina/Spain/UK production.

== Plot synopsis ==
During the last civil-military dictatorship in Argentina, the military government conducts what was known as a Dirty War against opponents, abducting and often murdering those opposed to its rule. Cecilia, a dissident journalist living in Buenos Aires, is kidnapped by the secret police to join the ranks of the disappeared. She had earlier published a challenging article in her outrage over the forced disappearance of students protesting the bus fares.

As her husband Carlos, a theatre director, begins to search frantically for her, he realizes that he has acquired psychic power that enables him to predict the future. Carlos is sought after by others who have lost loved ones. This power helps Carlos foresee what happens to his wife and other detainees. At one point, Carlos visits the Naval Mechanics School, revealed as a notorious center of torture and murder of detainees.

== Cast ==
- Antonio Banderas as Carlos Rueda
- Emma Thompson as Cecilia Rueda
- Leticia Dolera as Teresa Rueda, Carlos and Cecilia's daughter
- Maria Canals as Esme Palomares
- Rubén Blades as Silvio Ayala
- Mariana Seligmann as Guzman Tochter
- Irene Escolar as Eurydice
- Andreas Tang as himself
- Kuno Becker as Gustavo Santos, a warden
- Anton Lesser as General Guzmán
- Marzenka Novak as Sasha

== Reception ==
Review aggregation website Rotten Tomatoes gives the film an approval rating of 31% based on reviews from 13 critics, with an average rating of 4.30/10. Metacritic calculated an average score of 27 out of 100 based on 4 reviews, indicating "generally unfavorable" reviews.

Peter Bradshaw for The Guardian wrote:

"well, what can I say about something destined to be a cult classic of awfulness? Imagining Argentina is an excruciatingly misjudged attempt to impose a layer of occult spirituality on an important political subject... The spectacle of Banderas exercising his sensitive magic powers, intercut with Thompson getting horribly raped and beaten - with close-ups on her droll, quizzical face contorted in agony - is truly wince-making".

== See also ==
- Disappeared Detainees of the Dirty War
