= Figaro läßt sich scheiden =

1963 two-act opera by Giselher Klebe

- Opera by Giselher Klebe
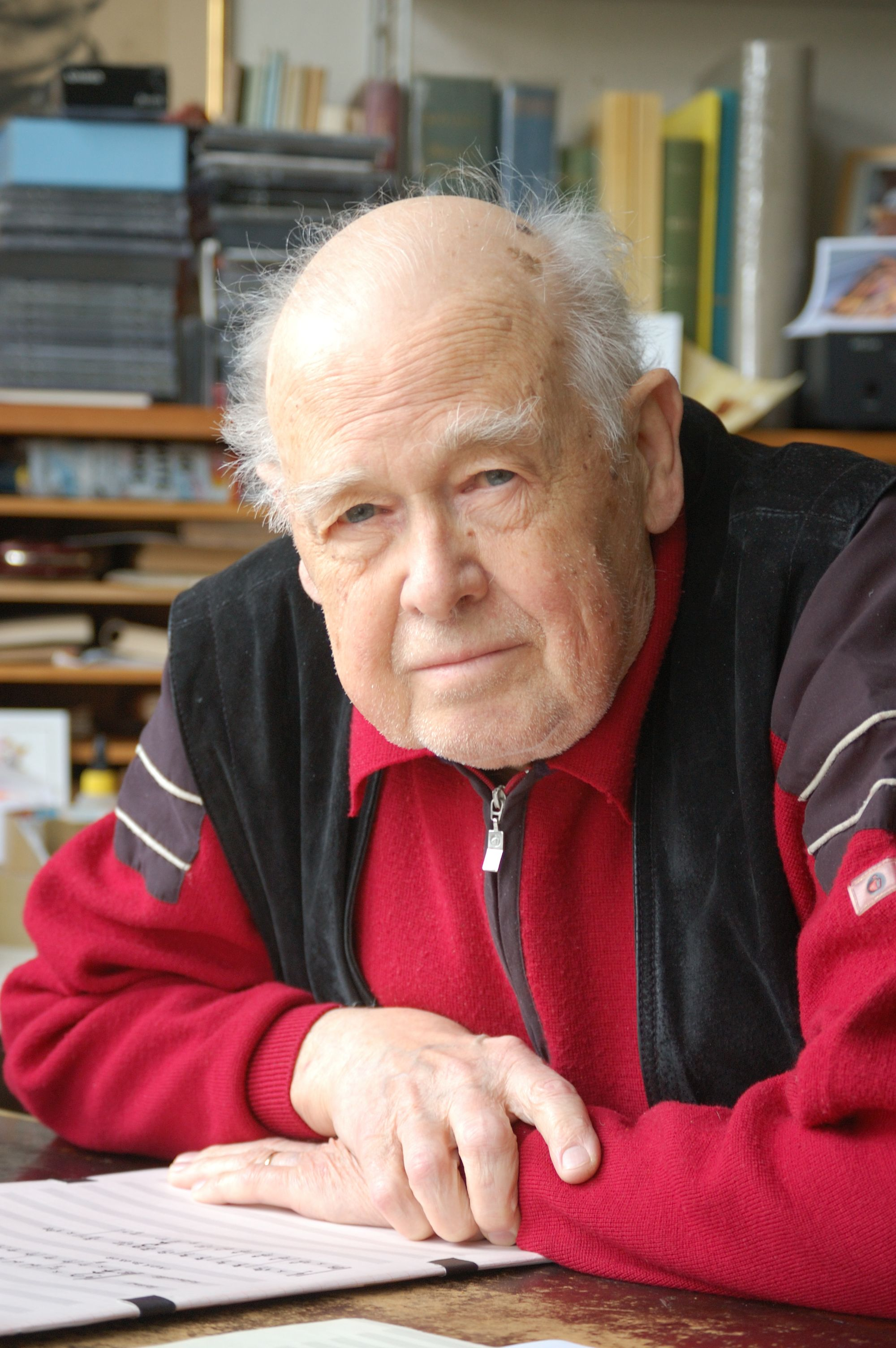
- The composer in 2008
- Translation: Figaro Gets Divorced
- Librettist: Klebe
- Language: German
- Based on: Figaro läßt sich scheiden by Ödön von Horváth
- Premiere: 28 June 1963; Hamburg State Opera

Figaro läßt sich scheiden, op.40, (Figaro Gets Divorced) is an opera in two acts by Giselher Klebe based on the comedy of the same name by Ödön von Horváth. Klebe also wrote the libretto for this work.

The work is a sequel to the Figaro plays of Pierre Beaumarchais. It follows the fortunes of some of the characters of The Marriage of Figaro during the period of the French Revolution. It premiered on 28 June 1963 at the Hamburg State Opera, when it was conducted by Leopold Ludwig. It was commissioned by Rolf Liebermann, then-director of the Staatsoper and also a composer.

Another opera using elements of the von Horváth play is Figaro Gets a Divorce by Elena Langer, (libretto by David Pountney), premiered by Welsh National Opera in 2016.

== Sources ==
- "Klebe, Giselher: Figaro läßt sich scheiden (1963)" on Boosey & Hawkes website, accessed 20 March 2015
