= Christopher Hampton =

British playwright, screenwriter and translator (born 1946)

Sir Christopher Hampton CBE FRSL
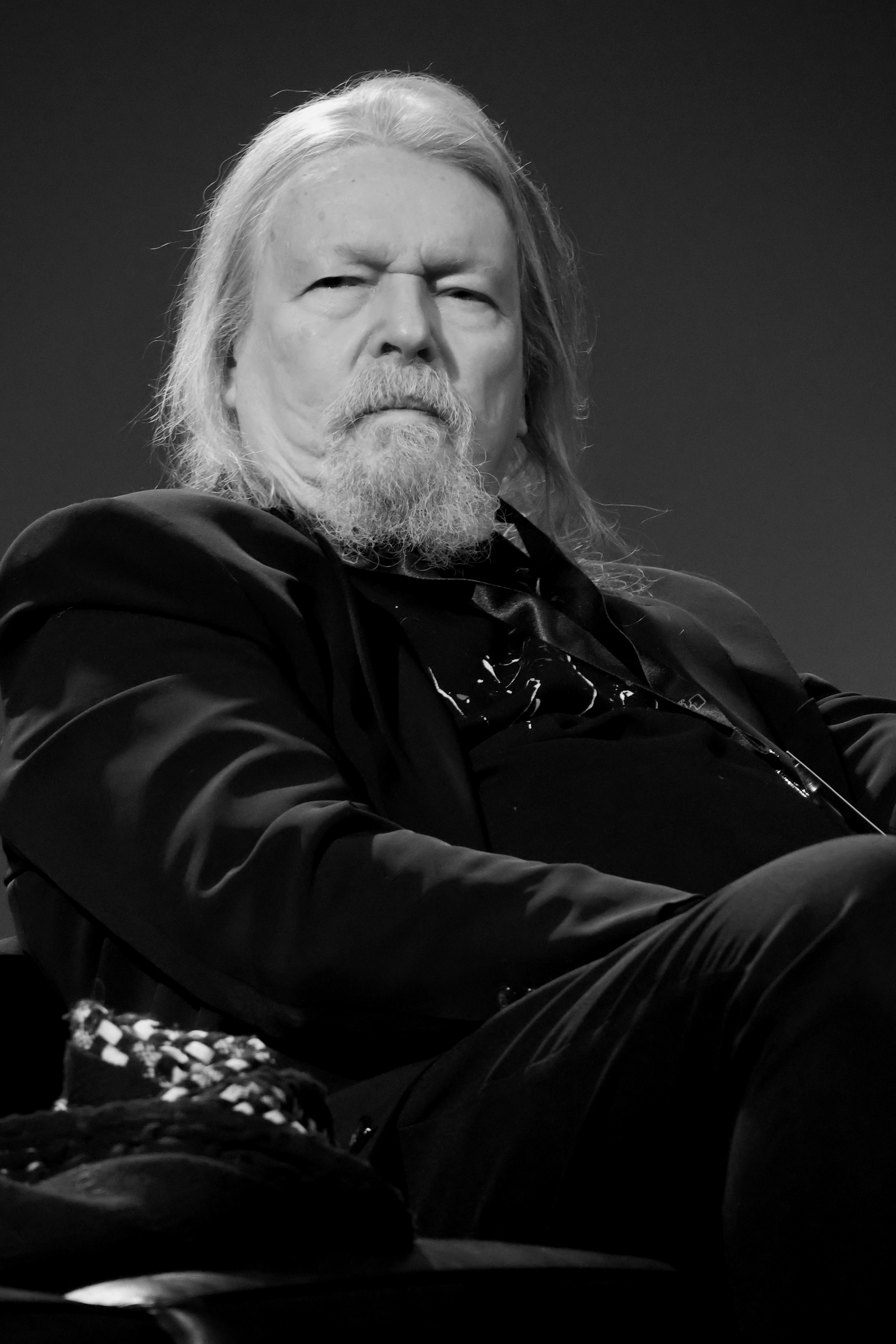
- Hampton in 2025
- Born: Christopher James Hampton; 26 January 1946 (age 80); Horta, Faial, Azores, Portugal
- Occupations: Playwright, screenwriter, translator
- Spouse: Laura de Holesch (m. 1971)
- Children: 2
- Awards: Full list

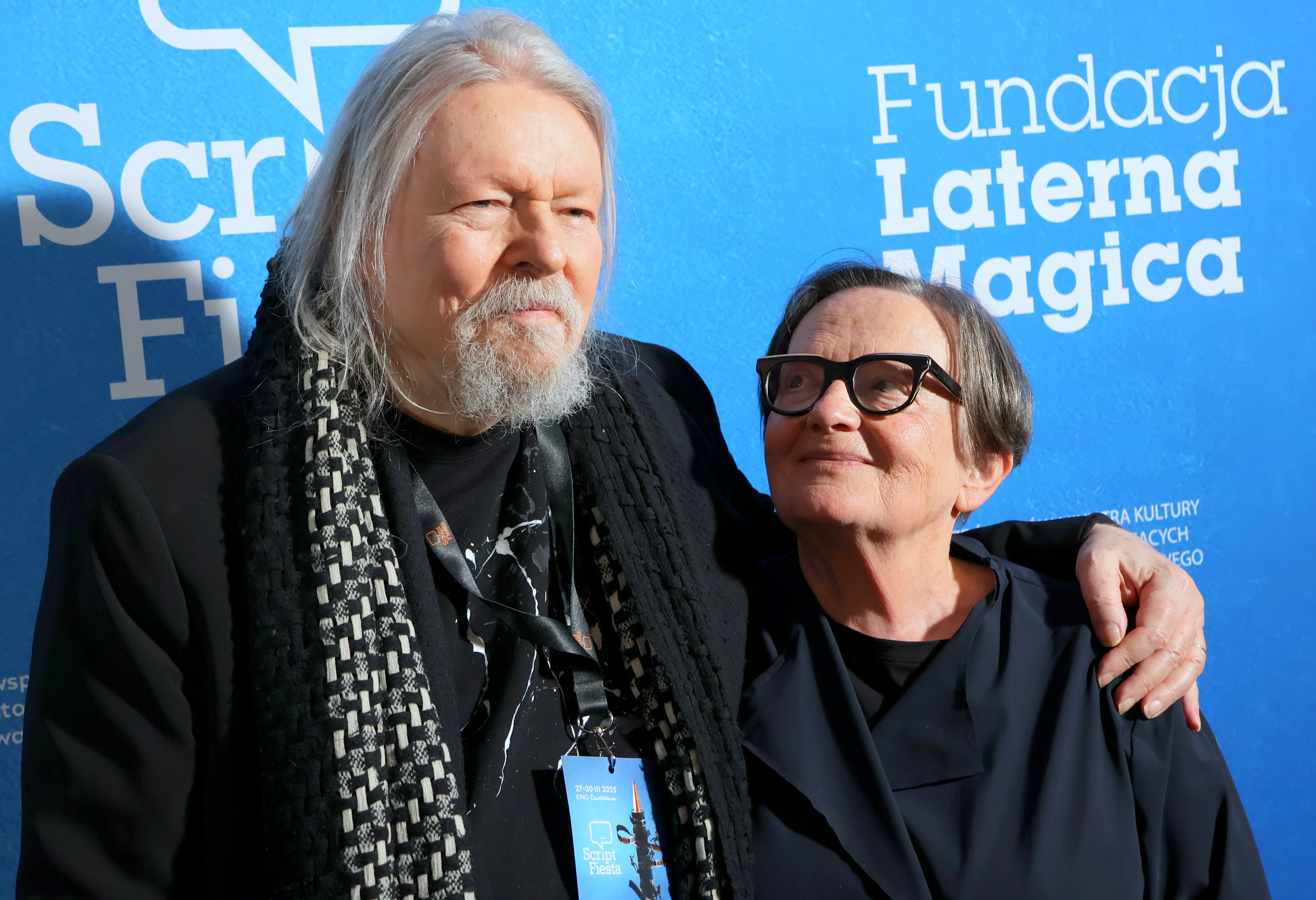
With Agnieszka Holland with whom he made the film Total Eclipse (1995) - Warsaw, Poland, 29 March 2025

Sir Christopher James Hampton CBE FRSL (born 26 January 1946) is a British playwright, screenwriter, and translator. He is best known for his play Les Liaisons Dangereuses based on the novel of the same name, and for the film adaptation. He has thrice received nominations for the Academy Award for Best Adapted Screenplay: for Dangerous Liaisons (1988), Atonement (2007) and The Father (2020); winning for the former and latter.

Hampton is also known for his work in the theatre including Les Liaisons Dangereuses, and The Philanthropist. He also translated the plays The Seagull (2008), God of Carnage (2009), The Father (2016), and The Height of the Storm (2019). He also wrote, with Don Black, the book and lyrics for the musical Sunset Boulevard (1994), for which they received Tony Awards for Best Book of a Musical and Best Original Score.

== Early life and theatrical debut ==
Hampton was born in Faial, Azores, to British parents Dorothy Patience (née Herrington) and Bernard Patrick Hampton, a marine telecommunications engineer for Cable & Wireless. His father's job led the family to settle in Aden, Yemen, and Cairo and Alexandria in Egypt, and later in Hong Kong and Zanzibar. During the Suez Crisis in 1956, the family had to flee Egypt under cover of darkness, leaving their possessions behind.

After a prep school at Reigate in Surrey, Hampton attended the independent boarding school Lancing College near the village of Lancing in West Sussex at the age of 13. There he won house colours for boxing and distinguished himself as a sergeant in the Combined Cadet Force (CCF). Among his contemporaries at Lancing was David Hare, later also a dramatist; poet Harry Guest was a teacher.

From 1964, Hampton read German and French at New College, Oxford, as a Sacher Scholar. He graduated with a starred First Class Degree in 1968.

Hampton became involved in the theatre while at Oxford University. The Oxford University Dramatic Society (OUDS) performed his original play When Did You Last See My Mother?, about adolescent homosexuality. He drew from his own experiences at Lancing. Hampton sent the work to the play agent Peggy Ramsay, who interested William Gaskill in it. The play was performed at the Royal Court Theatre in London, and soon transferred to the Comedy Theatre; in 1966, Hampton was the youngest writer in the modern era to have a play performed in the West End. Hampton's work on screenplays for the cinema also began around this time. He adapted this play for Richard Attenborough and Bryan Forbes, but a film version was never made.

== Stage plays and other works ==
From 1968 to 1970, Hampton worked as the Resident Dramatist at the Royal Court Theatre, and also as the company's literary manager. He continued to write plays: Total Eclipse, about the French poets and lovers Arthur Rimbaud and Paul Verlaine, was first performed in September 1968 at the Royal Court, but it received mixed reviews; in the New Statesman, Philip French wrote of "...a most intelligent dramatic treatment of the relationship between Rimblaud and Verlaine... a compelling evening in the theatre." The Philanthropist (1970) is set in an English university town and was influenced by Molière's The Misanthrope. The Royal Court delayed a staging for two years because of an uncertainty over its prospects, but their production was one of the Royal Court's more successful works up to that point. The production transferred to the Mayfair Theatre in London's West End and ran for nearly four years, winning the Evening Standard Theatre Award for Best Comedy. It reached Broadway in New York City in 1971.

His agent told him after this success: "You've got a choice: you can write the same play over and over for the next 30 years" or, alternatively, "you can decide to do something completely different every time". He told her that he was writing a play about the "extermination of the Brazilian Indians in the 1960s". Savages, set during the period of the military government and derived from an article "Genocide in Brazil" by Norman Lewis, was first performed in 1973. His first produced film adaptation, of Ibsen's A Doll's House (1973), was directed by Patrick Garland, and stars Anthony Hopkins and Claire Bloom.

He was elected a Fellow of the Royal Society of Literature in 1976.

A sojourn in Hollywood led to an unproduced film adaptation of Marlowe's play Edward II and the original script for Carrington. This period also inspired his play Tales from Hollywood (1982). This is a somewhat fictionalised account of exiled European writers living in the United States during the Second World War. (The lead character is based on Ödön von Horváth, who died in Paris in 1938). The play also explores the different philosophies of Horváth and the German playwright Bertolt Brecht (who lived in the United States in the 1940s). Hampton told The Guardian critic Michael Billington in 2007: "I lean towards the liberal writer, Horvath, rather than the revolutionary Brecht. I suppose I'm working out some internal conflict". The play was commissioned by the Center Theatre Group in Los Angeles; the Group first performed it in 1982. The play has been adapted in different versions for British and Polish television.

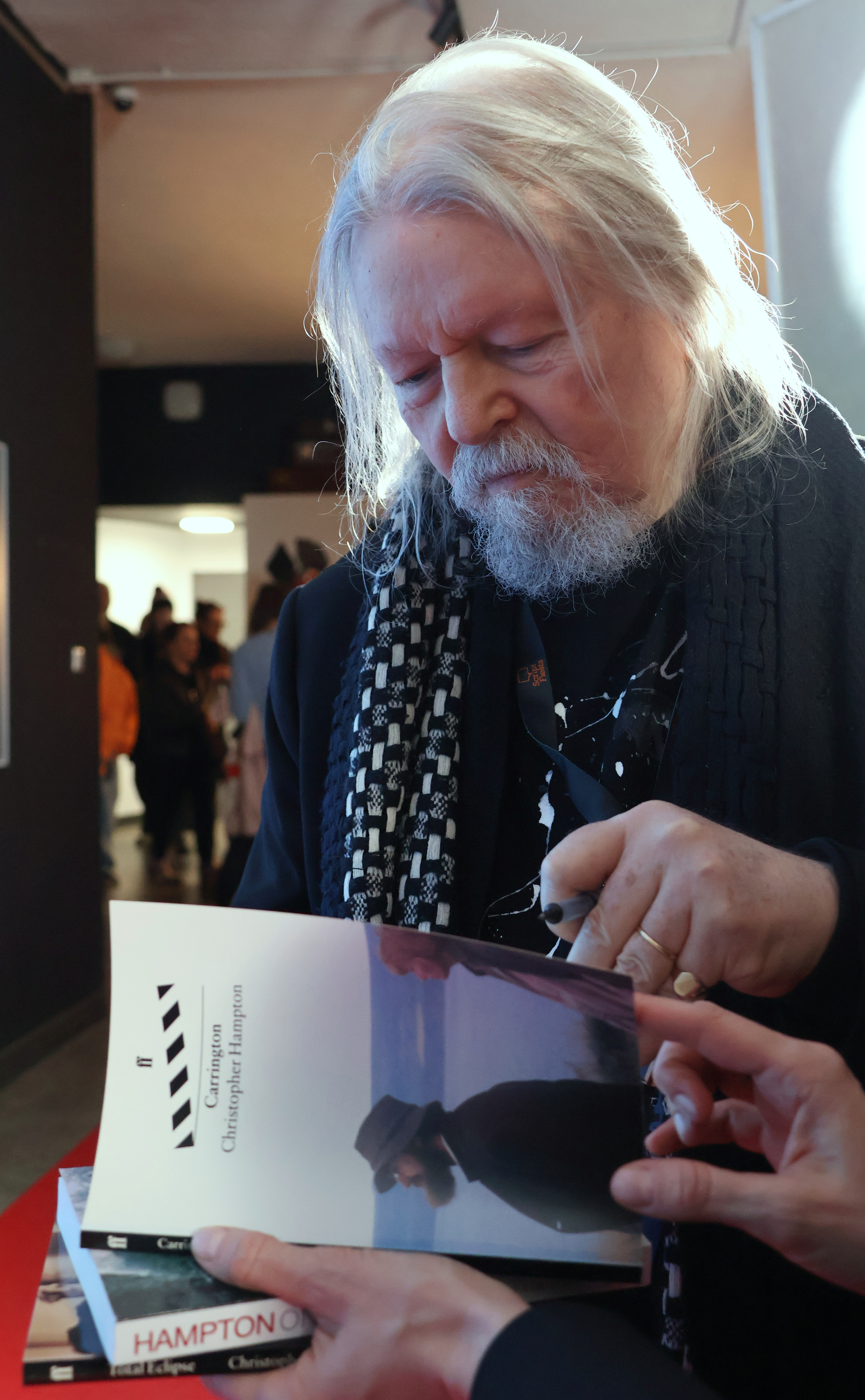
Hampton signs his screenplay for Carrington (1995); Warsaw, Poland, 29 March 2025

== Later works ==
Hampton won the Academy Award for Best Adapted Screenplay for his screen adaptation of his play Dangerous Liaisons (1988), directed by Stephen Frears and starring Glenn Close, John Malkovich, and Michelle Pfeiffer. He worked on Carrington (1995) for 18 years, writing multiple drafts. The play explores the relationship between painter Dora Carrington and author Lytton Strachey. Hampton went on to direct the feature film Carrington, starring Emma Thompson and Jonathan Pryce.

He was appointed Commander of the Order of the British Empire (CBE) in the 1999 Birthday Honours for services to literature.

Hampton both wrote and directed Imagining Argentina (2003), his adaptation of the 1987 novel by Lawrence Thornton. It explores society during the military dictatorship of Leopoldo Galtieri, when the government conducted a Dirty War against opponents, killing many in "forced disappearances". It starred Antonio Banderas and Emma Thompson. According to Hampton, this period of Argentinian history had not inspired a dramatic work before. "I decided to do something which it would be difficult to finance at a time when, for once, I was bombarded with offers. In 2007, Hampton was nominated for a second Academy Award for his screenplay and adaptation of Ian McEwan's novel Atonement, directed by Joe Wright and starring James McAvoy, Keira Knightley, and Saoirse Ronan.

Since the 1990s, Hampton has created the English translations of the works of French dramatists Yasmina Reza and Florian Zeller. Reza's Art ran for eight years in the West End, and was also produced in the United States. Hampton translated Reza's God of Carnage, which was the third-longest running Broadway play in the 2000s, playing 24 premieres and 452 regular performances. God of Carnage garnered six Tony nominations and three wins in 2009. God of Carnage actors James Gandolfini and Marcia Gay Harden, joined Philip Glass, Phillip Noyce and a host of other artists in a short documentary celebrating their Tony Award success and Mr. Hampton's 50 published plays and screenplays.

Hampton's translation into English of Michael Kunze and Sylvester Levay's Austrian musical Rebecca, based on Daphne du Maurier's novel of the same name, was supposed to premiere on Broadway in 2012, directed by Francesca Zambello and Michael Blakemore. The production did not open, with the producers, Ben Sprecher and Louise Forlenza, relinquishing the rights.

In 2012, Hampton joined forces with Tiana Alexandra-Silliphant to form Hampton Silliphant Management & Productions, which presented the play Appomattox at the Guthrie Theater in Minneapolis, Minnesota. The play concerns itself with historic events in the United States, 100 years apart in time: the historic meetings between Generals Ulysses S. Grant and Robert E. Lee, as well as Abraham Lincoln and Frederick Douglass in 1865, and the later machinations of Lyndon Johnson, J. Edgar Hoover and Martin Luther King – which ultimately led to the passing of the Voting Rights Act of 1965. Appomattox was also performed as an opera with Philip Glass at The Kennedy Center in 2015.

In 2020, Hampton served as screenwriter and executive producer for The Singapore Grip, an international TV mini-series exploring the Japanese invasion of Singapore during WWII. Adapted from the novel by J.G. Ferrell, the story portrays the intrigues and ultimate upheaval of British colonialism at the time of the Fall of Singapore.

The same year, Hampton co-wrote The Father, starring Anthony Hopkins and Olivia Colman, with Florian Zeller (based on Zeller's 2012 play Le Père), who directed the film in his feature directorial debut. The film received critical acclaim, and both Hampton and Zeller won a BAFTA and an Academy Award for Best Adapted Screenplay and received a Golden Globe nomination, while the film was nominated in the Best Picture categories.

Hampton was knighted in the 2020 New Year Honours for services to drama.

In March and April 2021, it was announced that Hampton and Zeller would co-write the adaptation of The Son (which serves as Zeller's and Hampton's follow-up to The Father) with Zeller directing, and Hugh Jackman and Laura Dern attached to star in the film. The Son had its world premiere at the 79th Venice International Film Festival on 7 September 2022, and was released in the United States on 11 November 2022, by Sony Pictures Classics.

== Credits ==
=== Plays ===
- 1964 – When Did You Last See My Mother?
- 1967 – Total Eclipse
- 1969 – The Philanthropist
- 1973 – Savages
- 1975 – Treats
- 1982 – Tales From Hollywood
- 1991 – White Chameleon
- 1994 – Alice's Adventures Under Ground
- 2002 – The Talking Cure
- 2012 – Appomattox
- 2019 – A German Life

=== Musicals (book and lyrics) ===
- 1993 – Sunset Boulevard with Don Black (music by Andrew Lloyd Webber)
- 2001 – Dracula, the Musical with Don Black (music by Frank Wildhorn)
- 2012 – Rebecca (translated from German) (music by Sylvester Levay, original lyrics by Michael Kunze)
- 2013 – Stephen Ward the Musical with Don Black (music by Andrew Lloyd Webber)

=== Adaptations ===
- 1982 – The Portage to San Cristobal of A.H. from the novella by George Steiner
- 1983 – Tartuffe by Molière
- 1985 – Les Liaisons Dangereuses from the novel by Choderlos de Laclos for the Royal Shakespeare Company
- 1993 – Sunset Boulevard for Andrew Lloyd Webber (book for the musical, based on the Billy Wilder film)
- 2001 – Dracula, the Musical for Frank Wildhorn
- 2006 – Embers from the novel by Sándor Márai
- 2009 – The Age of the Fish (in German Jugend ohne Gott) from the novel by Ödön von Horváth
- 2024 - Visit from an Unknown Woman

=== Films ===
Year	English title	Writer	Director	Producer	Notes
1973	A Doll's House	Yes	No	No	Adaptation of the Henrik Ibsen play
1977	Able's Will	Yes	No	No	Directed by Stephen Frears for the BBC
1979	Tales from the Vienna Woods	Yes	No	No	Directed by Maximilian Schell
1981	The History Man	Yes	No	No	Adaptation of the Malcolm Bradbury novel for the BBC
1983	The Honorary Consul	Yes	No	No	Adaptation of the Graham Greene novel
1986	The Wolf at the Door	Yes	No	No	
1986	Hotel du Lac	Yes	No	No	Adaptation of the novel by Anita Brookner
1986	The Good Father	Yes	No	No	Adaptation of the novel by Peter Prince
1986	Arriving Tuesday	No	No	Yes	
1988	Dangerous Liaisons	Yes	No	Yes	Adapted from his own play of the same name; directed by Stephen Frears
1989	The Ginger Tree	Yes	No	No	Adaptation of the Oswald Wynd novel for the BBC
1992	Tales from Hollywood	Yes	No	No	Adaptation of his play for the BBC
1995	Carrington	Yes	Yes	No	Directorial debut
1995	Total Eclipse	Yes	No	No	Directed by Agnieszka Holland)
1996	Mary Reilly	Yes	No	No	Adapted from the Valerie Martin novel about Dr. Jekyll's housemaid
1996	The Secret Agent	Yes	Yes	No	Adapted from the Joseph Conrad novel
2002	The Quiet American	Yes	No	No	Adaptation of the Graham Greene novel
2003	Imagining Argentina	Yes	Yes	No	
2007	Atonement	Yes	No	No	Adaptation of the Ian McEwan novel
2009	Chéri	Yes	No	No	
2011	A Dangerous Method	Yes	No	No	Adapted from the John Kerr novel; Directed by David Cronenberg.
2013	The Thirteenth Tale	Yes	No	No	Adapted from the Diane Setterfield's novel
2013	Adoration	Yes	No	No	Adapted from Doris Lessing's novella
2016	Ali and Nino	Yes	No	No	Adapted from Kurban Said's novel Ali and Nino
2020	The Father	Yes	No	No	Adapted from the Florian Zeller play
2020	The Singapore Grip	Yes	No	No	Adapted from the J.G. Farrell's 1978 novel
2022	The Son	Yes	No	No	Adapted from the Florian Zeller play

=== Translations ===
- The Seagull
- Uncle Vanya
- Hedda Gabler
- Don Juan by Molière
- 1973 – A Doll's House
- 1977 – Tales from the Vienna Woods, by Ödön von Horváth
- 1978 – Don Juan Comes Back from the War, by Ödön von Horváth
- 1989 – Faith, Hope and Charity, by Ödön von Horváth
- 1996 – 'Art' by Yasmina Reza
- 1998 – An Enemy of the People
- 2000 – Conversations After a Burial by Yasmina Reza
- 2001 – Life x 3 by Yasmina Reza
- 2008 – God of Carnage by Yasmina Reza
- 2009 – Judgement Day, by Ödön von Horváth
- 2010 – Rebecca (musical) by Michael Kunze
- 2014 – The Father by Florian Zeller
- 2015 – The Mother by Florian Zeller
- 2016 – The Truth by Florian Zeller
- 2017 – The Lie by Florian Zeller
- 2017 – Christmas Eve by Daniel Kehlmann
- 2018 – The Height of the Storm by Florian Zeller
- 2019 – The Son by Florian Zeller

=== Librettos ===
- 2005 – Waiting for the Barbarians, music by Philip Glass
- 2007 – Appomattox, music by Philip Glass
- 2014 – The Trial, music by Philip Glass

== Awards and nominations ==
Organizations	Year	Category	Work	Result	Ref.
Academy Awards	1988	Best Adapted Screenplay	Dangerous Liaisons	Won	
Academy Awards	2007	Best Adapted Screenplay	Atonement	Nominated	
Academy Awards	2020	Best Adapted Screenplay	The Father	Won	
BAFTA Awards	1989	Best Adapted Screenplay	Dangerous Liaisons	Won	
BAFTA Awards	1995	Best British Film	Carrington	Nominated	
BAFTA Awards	2007	Best British Film	Atonement	Nominated	
BAFTA Awards	2007	Best Adapted Screenplay	Atonement	Nominated	
BAFTA Awards	2020	Best British Film	The Father	Nominated	
BAFTA Awards	2020	Best Adapted Screenplay	The Father	Won	
Cannes Film Festival	1995	Palme d'Or	Carrington	Nominated	
Cannes Film Festival	1995	Jury Special Prize	Carrington	Won	
Critics' Choice Awards	2020	Best Adapted Screenplay	The Father	Nominated	
Golden Globe Awards	2007	Best Screenplay – Motion Picture	Atonement	Nominated	
Golden Globe Awards	2020	Best Screenplay – Motion Picture	The Father	Nominated	
Tony Awards	1995	Best Book of a Musical	Sunset Blvd.	Won	
Tony Awards	1995	Best Original Score	Sunset Blvd.	Won	
Writers Guild of America Awards	1988	Best Adapted Screenplay	Dangerous Liaisons	Won	
Venice International Film Festival	2003	Golden Lion	Imagining Argentina	Nominated	
Septimius Awards	2022	Lifetime Achievement Award	Lifetime Achievement Award	Won	

== See also ==
- List of British playwrights since 1950
- List of Academy Award winners and nominees from Great Britain

== Bibliography ==
- Massimo Verzella, "Embers di Christopher Hampton e la traduzione della malinconia", Paragrafo, II (2006), pp. 69–82
