= Elisabeth Reichart =

Austrian author (born 1953)

Elisabeth Reichart (born 1953, Steyregg, Upper Austria) is an Austrian author.

== Biography ==
Reichart's grandmother survived the Nazi occupation of Austria and strongly influenced the life of Reichart. Reichart wrote her dissertation about the Austrian resistance movement and the silence of Austria during World War II. Soon after, she began writing her first novel, February Shadows.

Reichart developed into a well-known Austrian writer after the release of February Shadows, a historical novel which dealt with the Mühlviertler Hasenjagd ("The Rabbit Hunt of the Mill District"), and has since produced five novels, a book of short stories, several dramas, and a collection of radio plays.

== Awards ==
In 1993, she received the Austrian National Prize for the Promotion of Literature and in 1995, she was awarded the prestigious Elias Canetti Grant, named for Nobel Prize winner Elias Canetti. In 2000, she received the Anton Wildgans Prize.

== Literary works ==
- Februarschatten 1984 (February Shadows)
- Komm über den See 1988 (Come Across the Lake)
- La Valse 1992
- Fotze 1993
- Nachtmär 1995 (Nighttale)
- Das vergessene Lächeln der Amaterasu 1990 (The Forgotten Smile of the Amaterasu)

== See also ==
- List of Austrian writers

== Bibliography ==
- DeMeritt, Linda. "The Art of Confronting Taboos." Department of Modern and Classical Languages of Allegheny College. 2000.
- Michaels, Jennifer E. "Breaking the Silence: Elisabeth Reichart's Protest against the Denial of the Nazi past in Austria." German Studies Review. Vol. 19, No. 1 (1996): pp. 9–27. JSTOR. German Studies Association. March 31, 2010.
- Wolf, Christa. "Afterword." February Shadows. Riverside: Ariadne Press, 1989.
