= Savages (play) =

1973 play by British playwright Christopher Hampton

Savages is a play by British writer Christopher Hampton. It premiered at the Royal Court Theatre, London in 1973, with leading players Paul Scofield, Tom Conti and Michael Pennington, and was published the following year by Faber and Faber.

Hampton was inspired to write this play by the article "Genocide", written by journalist Norman Lewis and published in The Sunday Times Colour Magazine on 23 February 1969. Lewis described the systematic extermination in Brazil of its Indians, ranging from the 16th century to the present day under the military dictatorship.

The American premiere of Savages took place on August 15, 1974 at the Mark Taper Forum in Los Angeles. It was presented by the Center Theatre Group and was directed by Gordon Davidson. It featured Joseph Maher, Michael Cristofer, and Ben Piazza.

== Background ==
The play is based on an incident in the early 1960s, in which most of the Cintas Tribe was massacred on one of their traditional feast days, the Quarup. Sticks of dynamite were dropped from a plane, killing most of the members of the tribe in place. Hampton based his research about the Quarup and its legends on Mythology of all Ages and on Claude Lévi-Strauss's works of anthropology: Le cru et le cuit and Du Miel aux Cendres.

The political background was the actions of the military dictatorship in Brazil from 1964 to 1985. The regime, backed by the United States through the CIA, suppressed all political and civil opposition by widespread use of torture and intense police pressure. Four years after the military coup d'état, a guerrilla movement developed under the leadership of Carlos Marighella of the A.L.N (Ação Libertadora Nacional). In 1969 and 1970, the ALN kidnapped various ambassadors and embassy officials from the USA, Japan, West Germany, and Switzerland in order to exchange them for the release of hundreds and thousands of political prisoners. Marighela was killed by the police in November 1969. By 1972, the guerilla movement was said to be crushed.

== Plot summary ==
Alan West, British government official in Brazil, is kidnapped by the M.R.B. (Movimento Revolucionario Brasileiro) in order to be exchanged for political prisoners. His guard, Carlos Esquerdo, is a would-be philosopher, reciting quotes by Fanon and Camus, and interested in poetry and chess. He tries to make his hostage understand the ideas behind the revolutionary movement, reads their manifesto to him, and says that the corrupt government must be punished for "selling our country to the interests of US capitalism, which it has allowed to exploit our resources and steal our land, while our people starve and suffer all the miseries of poverty and unemployment".

While Esquerdo focuses on the plight of the 90 million Brazilian workers and landless farmers, West is preoccupied with the extinction of the indigenous Indians. In flashbacks, the audience learns that West has long been interested in Indian culture, rituals, and legends, and that he is aware of the genocide under way in the country. He knows that if no measures are taken, there will be few Indians left to tell their tales and perform their cultural rites of the Quarup. They were being murdered by gifts of poisoned sugar, introduced infectious disease, and outright slaughter financed by greedy land owners and speculators, both foreign and domestic. Henchman Ataide Pereira tells an American investigator of the history of murder and mercilessness. The play also criticises missionaries; Reverend Elmer Penn is portrayed as treating "his flock" of converted Indians like domesticated animals not fit to think for themselves. An anthropologist sees the situation as clearly as West but has no power or means to change it for the better.

Finally, Esquerdo shoots and kills West. The play ends with the historic bombing during the Quarup celebrations, which extinguished the Cintas Tribe.
