= Empire (2002 film) =

- Theatrical release poster
- Directed by: Franc. Reyes
- Written by: Franc. Reyes
- Produced by: Daniel Bigel; Michael Mailer
- Starring: John Leguizamo; Peter Sarsgaard; Denise Richards; Delilah Cotto; Sônia Braga; Isabella Rossellini
- Music by: Rubén Blades
- Production company: Arenas Entertainment
- Distributed by: Universal Pictures
- Release dates: January 16, 2002 (Sundance); December 6, 2002 (United States)
- Running time: 100 minutes
- Country: United States
- Language: English
- Budget: $4 million
- Box office: $18.5 million

Empire is a 2002 American gangster film written and directed by Franc. Reyes. It stars John Leguizamo, Peter Sarsgaard, Denise Richards, Sônia Braga, Isabella Rossellini, Fat Joe, and Treach. The film premiered at the 2002 Sundance Film Festival and was given a theatrical release on December 6, 2002.

== Plot ==
Victor "Vic" Rosa is a drug dealer in New York City who sells a specific brand of heroin called "Empire". His territory is located in the South Bronx, where he and his other rivals, Hector ("Exorcist"), Tito ("Severe"), and Negro ("Dancing Queen") all maintain an uneasy truce because they all purchase their drugs from the same supplier, drug lord Joanna "La Colombiana" Menendez.

Victor's girlfriend Carmen invites him to a chic white-collar party being thrown by her friend Trish and her boyfriend Jack Wimmer, an investment banker. He then asks for and is given permission by La Colombiana's younger brother Rafael to assassinate local kingpin Tito. A shootout occurs, which results in Tito and his young son being killed. With a baby on the way, Vic decides to go straight, and begins to invest money with Jack, receiving significant returns. His friendship with Jack affords Vic a whole new lifestyle, and creates a rift between him and Carmen.

Jack offers Vic an investment opportunity for over 300% return, but there's a catch: the minimum buy-in is $4.5 million, $1.5 million more than Vic has. He approaches La Colombiana with an offer, in which she agrees to lend Vic the money he needs, if he gives her a 500% return and stops a feud between his best friend Jimmy and rival dealer Hector.

Despite Vic's best efforts, the feud escalates and Jimmy kills Hector. La Colombiana orders Vic to kill Jimmy, but instead Vic tells Jimmy to leave town instead. Vic receives his money and gives it to Jack, who disappears the next day. Victor tracks him down and attempts to reclaim his money, but kills Jack and Trish when they resist. He escapes with Carmen and her family to Puerto Rico and opens a bar on the south side of the island with what little money he has left.

At the end of the movie, Vic is preparing to head to the hospital to see the birth of his child when Rafael arrives and shoots him in the head. The movie ends with Vic lying dead.

== Cast ==
- John Leguizamo as Victor "Vic" Rosa
- Peter Sarsgaard as Jack Wimmer
- Denise Richards as Trish
- Vincent Laresca as Jimmy
- Isabella Rossellini as Joanna "La Colombiana" Menendez
- Sônia Braga as Iris
- Delilah Cotto as Carmen
- Nestor Serrano as Rafael Menendez
- Treach as Chedda
- Rafael Baez as Jay ("the idiot savant")
- Fat Joe as Tito
- Carlos Leon as Hector
- Granville Adams as Det. Jones
- Sam Coppola as Robert Gold
- Rob B. Campbell as Detective O'Brien

== Production ==
The film is the directorial debut of Franc. Reyes. Reyes was inspired to make the film based on his experiences growing up in the South Bronx and losing friends to the crack epidemic. Reyes said his film is different from other gangster films, such as Scarface and Blood In, Blood Out, because it is directed by a Latino.

Empire began filming in New York in September 2000.

== Release ==
Empire premiered at the Sundance Film Festival in January 2002 in the American Spectrum section. Universal Pictures and Arenas Entertainment picked up the film for US$650,000 and released it on December 6, 2002, in 867 theaters.

== Reception ==
Empire received negative reviews. It carries a score of 21% on the review aggregator website Rotten Tomatoes, based on 101 reviews. The website's consensus reads, "In terms of the gangster genre, Empire's story is yet another tired retread." Metacritic, which uses a weighted average, assigned the film a score of 38 out of 100, based on 27 critics, indicating "generally unfavorable" reviews.

In a review that awarded 2 and ½ stars out of 4, Roger Ebert wrote "’Empire' comes so close to working that you can see there from here. It has the right approach and the right opening premise, but it lacks the zest and it goes for a plot twist instead of trusting the material. I recently saw 'Goodfellas' again, and this film is similar; they're both about the rise and fall of a gangster, narrated by himself, and complicated by a wife who walks out when she catches him with another woman. And 'Empire' has a story hook that could have transformed this story into another classic."

In a positive review, Mick LaSalle of the San Francisco Chronicle wrote the film "has a capacity to surprise" and "Gangland hits here are more clumsy and personal, more small-town and familial, than in the usual gangster movie. The fresh take makes for a fresh experience." LaSalle concluded, "In the end, the story of 'Empire' gets completely crazy, and pretty improbable, as if Reyes quit writing about what he knew and started throwing in any wild thing he could think of. Still, the movie stays compelling, if only because we can never guess where it might go."

== See also ==
- List of American films of 2002
- List of hood films
