= Figaro Gets a Divorce =

Opera by Elena Langer

Figaro Gets a Divorce is an opera by the Russian-British composer Elena Langer to a libretto by David Pountney. It premiered on 21 February 2016 at the Welsh National Opera at Cardiff.

== Background ==
Figaro Gets a Divorce is conceived as a sequel to Mozart's 1786 opera Le Nozze di Figaro (The Marriage of Figaro) based on the 1778 play La Folle Journée, ou Le Mariage de Figaro, by Pierre Beaumarchais. This had been created by Beaumarchais as a sequel to his play Le Barbier de Séville. The latter was also set as the opera The Barber of Seville by Rossini in 1816 (itself preceded by other versions, including a 1782 setting by Giovanni Paisiello). Pountney, who in his capacity as Chief Executive and Artistic Director of the Welsh National Opera commissioned the composition, was inspired in his libretto by two different theatrical follow-ups to these two plays, Beaumarchais's own La Mère coupable (The Guilty Mother), and Ödön von Horváth's 1936 play, Figaro läßt sich scheiden (Figaro Gets a Divorce). Both of these plays have previous operatic settings, the former by Darius Milhaud (1966), Inger Wikström (Den brottsliga modern, 1990), and Thierry Pécou (2010), the latter by Giselher Klebe (1963). The opera takes the characters into the period of the French Revolution.

The opera was staged in Cardiff in sequence with the Rossini and Mozart operas, using the same set layout and many of the same singers. The set designs were by Ralph Koltai and Pountney himself directed all three operas. After Cardiff the work was also seen in Birmingham, Llandudno, Bristol, Southampton, Milton Keynes and Plymouth. Alongside the "febrile and glittery soundscape" Langer created for the Almavivas' flight from revolution, there was also her "jazzier style that added the lighter mood and the element of hope".

Langer has said that in the new opera, the character of Cherubino (a sex-obsessed young teenager in the Mozart opera) has become 'sleazier'; the role (which is travesti in Mozart) is to be sung by a counter-tenor. Pountney has said

It has been a great inspiration to imagine the future lives of these great characters of operatic and theatrical literature, to see how they might be tested by events and, in many cases, emerge as stronger and more admirable people. Of course all three operas should stand on their own, but the audience that is able to experience all three will, I hope, enjoy a truly rewarding operatic journey.

== Roles ==
Role	Voice type	Premiere cast, 21 February 2016 (Conductor: Justin Brown)
Count	baritone	Mark Stone
Countess	soprano	Elizabeth Watts
Susanna	soprano	Marie Arnet
Figaro	baritone	David Stout
The Cherub	countertenor	Andrew Watts
Angelika, ward of the Count	soprano	Rhian Lois
Serafin, son of the Countess (travesti role)	mezzo-soprano	Naomi O'Connell
The Major	tenor	Alan Oke

== Synopsis ==
The Count is fleeing with his household from a revolution in an unspecified country and time. They are captured at the border by the enigmatic Major who seeks to bring them under his power. He informs Angelika and Serafin that they are in fact brother and sister, Angelika being the child of a liaison of the Count. He also knows that Serafin is in fact the result of a one-night stand between the Countess and Cherubino, who is reported killed in battle. The Major hopes to marry Angelika himself, and takes protection money from Figaro when the latter attempts to set up again as a barber. Figaro and Susanna quarrel, as Susanna wants a child and Figaro refuses to consider this in such turbulent times. Susanna encounters Cherubino, now known as 'The Cherub' and proprietor of a sleazy bar; he employs her as a chanteuse. The Countess refuses to be blackmailed by the Major and confesses Serafin's parentage to the Count. Susanna also confesses she is pregnant, with The Cherub as the father. Figaro helps the family to flee the clutches of the Major back to the Count's castle, in the process he shoots The Cherub. The Major, who is a double agent also working for the forces of the Revolution, seeks to trap the others in the castle and arrange for their murder. However Figaro, Susanna, Angelika and Serafin escape through a secret passage, whilst the Count and Countess remain behind to face the music.

== Sources ==
- Rosenthal, Harold and John Warrack (1979). The Concise Oxford Dictionary of Opera (2nd edition). London: Oxford University Press. ISBN 0-19-311318-X
