= Ödön von Horváth =

Austro-Hungarian playwright and novelist (1901–1938)

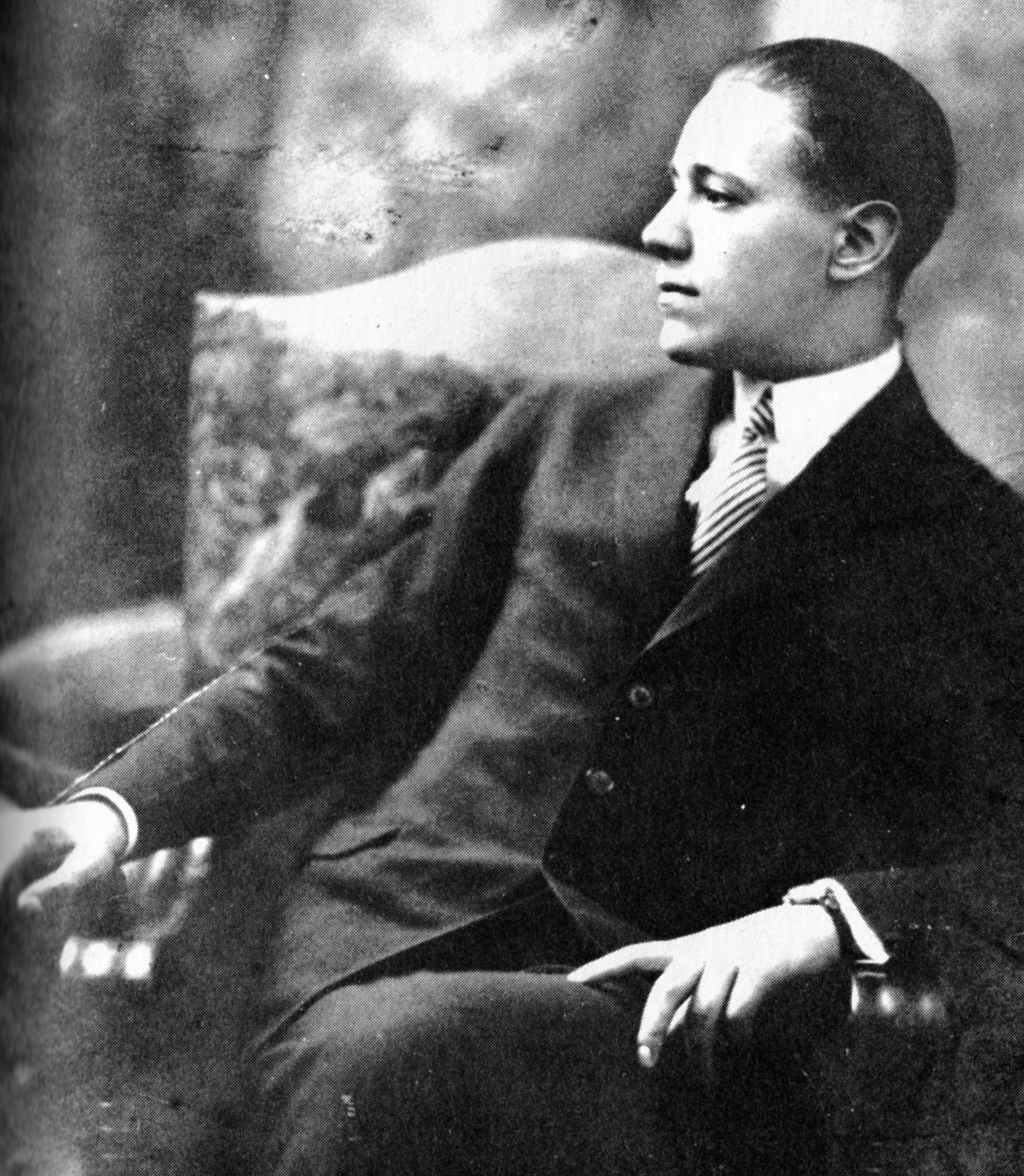
- Von Horváth in 1919
- Born: Edmund Josef von Horváth; 9 December 1901; Sušak, Rijeka, Austro-Hungarian Empire (now Croatia)
- Died: 1 June 1938 (aged 36); Paris, French Third Republic (now France)
- Occupations: playwright and novelist

Edmund Josef von Horváth (9 December 1901 – 1 June 1938) was an Austro-Hungarian playwright and novelist who wrote in German, and went by the nom de plume Ödön von Horváth (German pronunciation: [ˈøːdœn fɔn ˈhɔʁvaːt]). He was one of the most critically admired writers of his generation prior to his untimely death. He enjoyed a series of successes on the stage with socially poignant and romantic plays, including Revolte auf Côte 3018 (1927), Sladek (1929), Italienische Nacht (1930), Hin und Her (1934), and Der Jüngste Tag (1937). His novels include Der ewige Spießer (1930), Ein Kind unserer Zeit (1938), and Jugend ohne Gott (1937).

== Early life and education ==
Ödön von Horváth was the eldest son of an Austro-Hungarian diplomat of Hungarian origins from Slavonia, Edmund (Ödön) Josef Horváth, and Maria Lulu Hermine (Prehnal) Horváth, who was from an Austro-Hungarian military family.

From 1908, Ödön attended elementary school in Budapest, and later attended the Rákóczianum, where his education was in the Hungarian language. In 1909, his father was ennobled and assigned to Munich, unaccompanied. In 1913, Horváth attended secondary school in Pressburg and Vienna, where he learned German as a second language, and earned the Matura (secondary school diploma) then reunited with his parents at Murnau am Staffelsee, in Upper Bavaria; from 1919, Horváth studied at LMU Munich.

== Later life and death ==
He started writing as a student, from 1920. After quitting university without a degree in early 1922, he moved to Berlin. Later, he lived in Salzburg and Murnau am Staffelsee. In 1931, he was awarded, along with Erik Reger, the Kleist Prize. In 1933, at the beginning of the Nazi regime in Germany, he relocated to Vienna. Following the annexation of the Federal State of Austria with Nazi Germany in 1938, Horváth emigrated to Paris.

Horváth was hit by a falling branch from a tree and killed during a thunderstorm on the Champs-Élysées in Paris, opposite the Théâtre Marigny, in June 1938. Ironically, only a few days earlier, Horváth had said to a friend: "I am not so afraid of the Nazis...There are worse things one can be afraid of, namely things one is afraid of without knowing why. For instance, I am afraid of streets. Roads can be hostile to one, can destroy one. Streets scare me." And a few years earlier, Horváth had written poetry about lightning: "Yes, thunder, that it can do. And bolt and storm. Terror and destruction."

Horváth was buried in the Saint-Ouen Cemetery, in northern Paris. In 1988, on the 50th anniversary of his death, his remains were transferred to Vienna and reinterred at the Heiligenstädter Friedhof.

== Literary themes ==
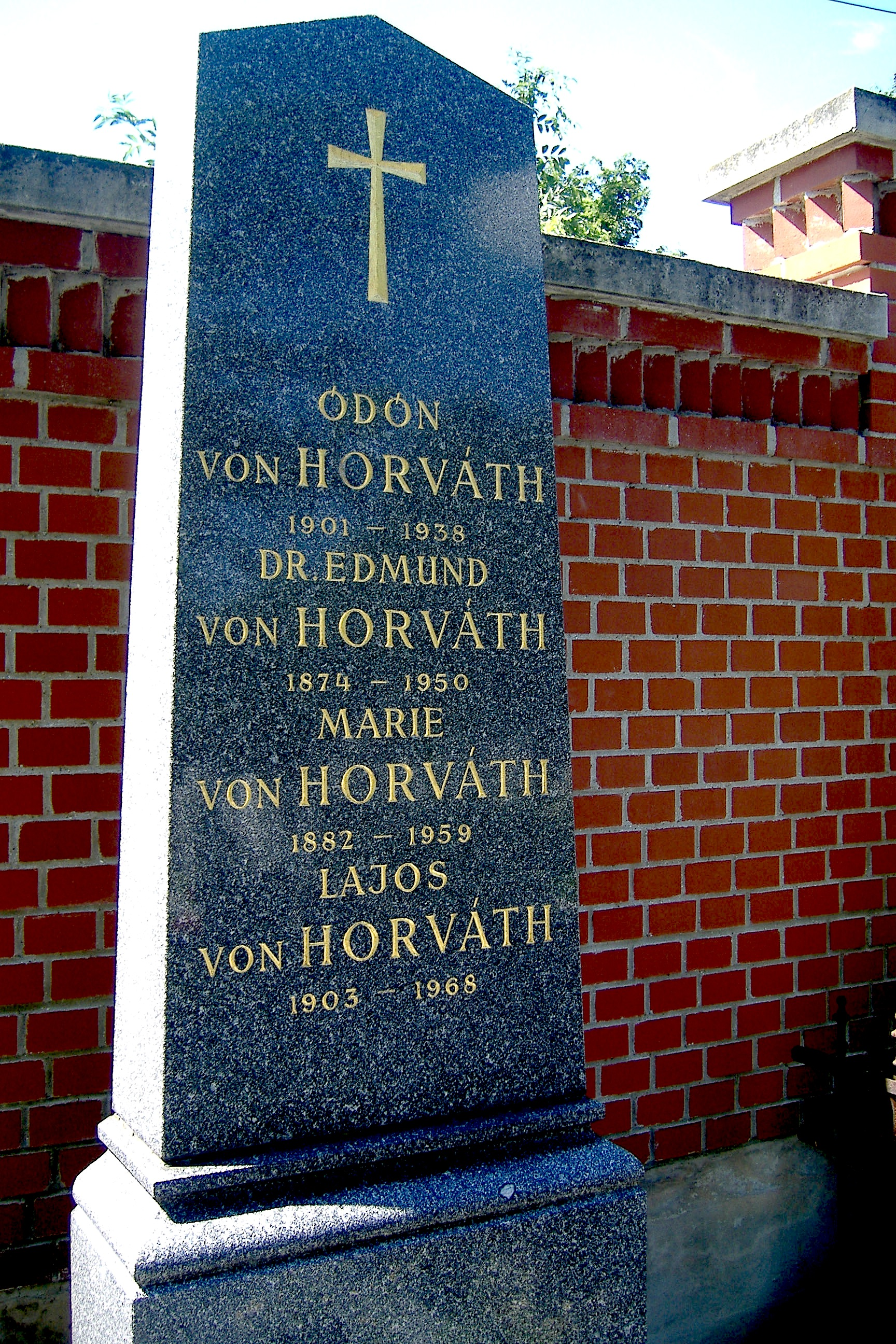
Ödön von Horváth's family tombstone in Vienna

Important topics in Horváth's works were popular culture, politics, and history. He especially tried to warn of the rise of Fascism in Europe and its dangers. Among Horváth's more enduringly popular works, Jugend ohne Gott (Youth Without God) describes the youth in Nazi Germany from the point of view of a disgruntled teacher who initially is an opportunist but is helpless against the racist and militaristic Nazi propaganda that dehumanizes his pupils.

The English title of his novel Ein Kind unserer Zeit (A Child of Our Time) was used by Michael Tippett for his oratorio (1939–1941), composed during World War II.

== Works ==
=== Plays ===
- Das Buch der Tänze, 1920
- Mord in der Mohrengasse, 1923
- Zur schönen Aussicht, 1926
- Revolte auf Côte 3018 (Revolt on Hill 3018), 1927; rewritten as Die Bergbahn (The Mountain Railway), 1929
- Sladek der schwarze Reichswehrmann, 1929, originally Sladek oder Die schwarze Armee (Sladek in volume Plays One, translation by Penny Black, Oberon, 2000, ISBN 1-84002-133-0)
- Rund um den Kongreß, 1929 (A Sexual Congress in volume Plays One, translation by Penny Black, Oberon, 2000, ISBN 1-84002-133-0)
- Italienische Nacht, 1930 (Italian Night in volume Plays Two, Oberon, 2000, ISBN 1-84002-152-7)
- Geschichten aus dem Wiener Wald (Tales from the Vienna Woods), 1931, winner of the Kleist Prize the same year; available as well in volume Plays Two, Oberon, 2000, ISBN 1-84002-152-7)
- Glaube, Liebe, Hoffnung, 1932 (Faith, Hope, and Charity in volume Four Plays, PAJ Publications, 1986, ISBN 1-55554-002-3)
- Kasimir und Karoline, 1932 (Kasimir and Karoline in volume Four Plays, PAJ Publications, 1986, ISBN 1-55554-002-3)
- Die Unbekannte aus der Seine, 1933
- Hin und Her, 1934
- Don Juan kommt aus dem Krieg, 1936 (Don Juan Comes Back From the War, Faber & Faber, 1978, ISBN 0-571-11301-X)
- Figaro läßt sich scheiden, 1936. Giselher Klebe wrote the libretto and composed his 1963 opera of the same name based on this work; Elena Langer's 2016 opera Figaro Gets a Divorce, to a libretto by David Pountney, is also largely based on the play. (Figaro Gets a Divorce in volume Four Plays, PAJ Publications, 1986, ISBN 1-55554-002-3)
- Pompeji. Komödie eines Erdbebens, 1937
- Ein Dorf ohne Männer, 1937
- Himmelwärts, 1937
- Der Jüngste Tag, 1937 (Giselher Klebe composed his 1980 opera of the same name based on this work; Lore Klebe wrote the libretto) (Judgement Day in volume Four Plays, PAJ Publications, 1986, ISBN 1-55554-002-3)

=== Novels ===
- Sechsunddreißig Stunden, 1929
- Der ewige Spießer, 1930 (The Eternal Philistine, 2011)
- Jugend ohne Gott, 1937 (The Age of the Fish, 1939)
- Ein Kind unserer Zeit, 1938 (A Child of Our Time, 1939)

=== Other prose ===
- Sportmärchen, 1924–1926
- Interview, 1932
- Gebrauchsanweisung, 1932

== Quotes ==
A few select quotes amongst many by Horváth:

- "Nothing conveys the feeling of infinity as much as stupidity does." (Motto of Geschichten aus dem Wienerwald)
- "Eigentlich bin ich ganz anders, nur komme ich so selten dazu." "Actually what I'm really like is very different. I just so rarely find time for it." (From Zur schönen Aussicht)
- Ödön von Horváth was once walking in the Bavarian Alps when he discovered the skeleton of a long dead man with his knapsack still intact. Von Horváth opened the knapsack and found a postcard reading "Having a wonderful time". Asked by friends what he did with it, von Horváth replied "I posted it".
- "If you ask me what is my native country, I answer: I was born in Fiume, grew up in Belgrade, Budapest, Pressburg (Bratislava), Vienna and Munich, and I have a Hungarian passport, but I have no fatherland. I am a very typical mix of old Austria-Hungary: at once Magyar, Croatian, German and Czech; my country is Hungary; my mother tongue is German."

== In popular culture ==
- Christopher Hampton's play Tales from Hollywood (1982, adapted for television in 1992) portrays a fictional Horváth. He survives the falling branch and moves to the United States, where expatriate German authors such as Bertolt Brecht and Heinrich Mann write for the motion picture industry.
- Danilo Kiš's short story "The Man Without a Country", published in the 1994 collection The Lute and The Scars, fictionalizes the death of Horváth.
- Duncan Macmillan adapted Horváth's Don Juan Comes Back From The War for the National Theatre Studio and Finborough Theatre in 2012. The updated production used contemporary language to explore the effects of conflict and trauma. It was directed by Andrea Ferran.
- Lydia Davis' short story "Ödön von Horváth Out Walking," published in the 2014 collection Can't and Won't, concerns Horváth's encounter with the skeleton in the Alps.

== See also ==
- List of Austrian writers

== Bibliography ==
Balme, Christopher B., The Reformation of Comedy Genre Critique in the Comedies of Odon von Horvath University of Otago, Dunedin 1985 ISBN 0-9597650-2-6
