= Don Juan Comes Back from the War =

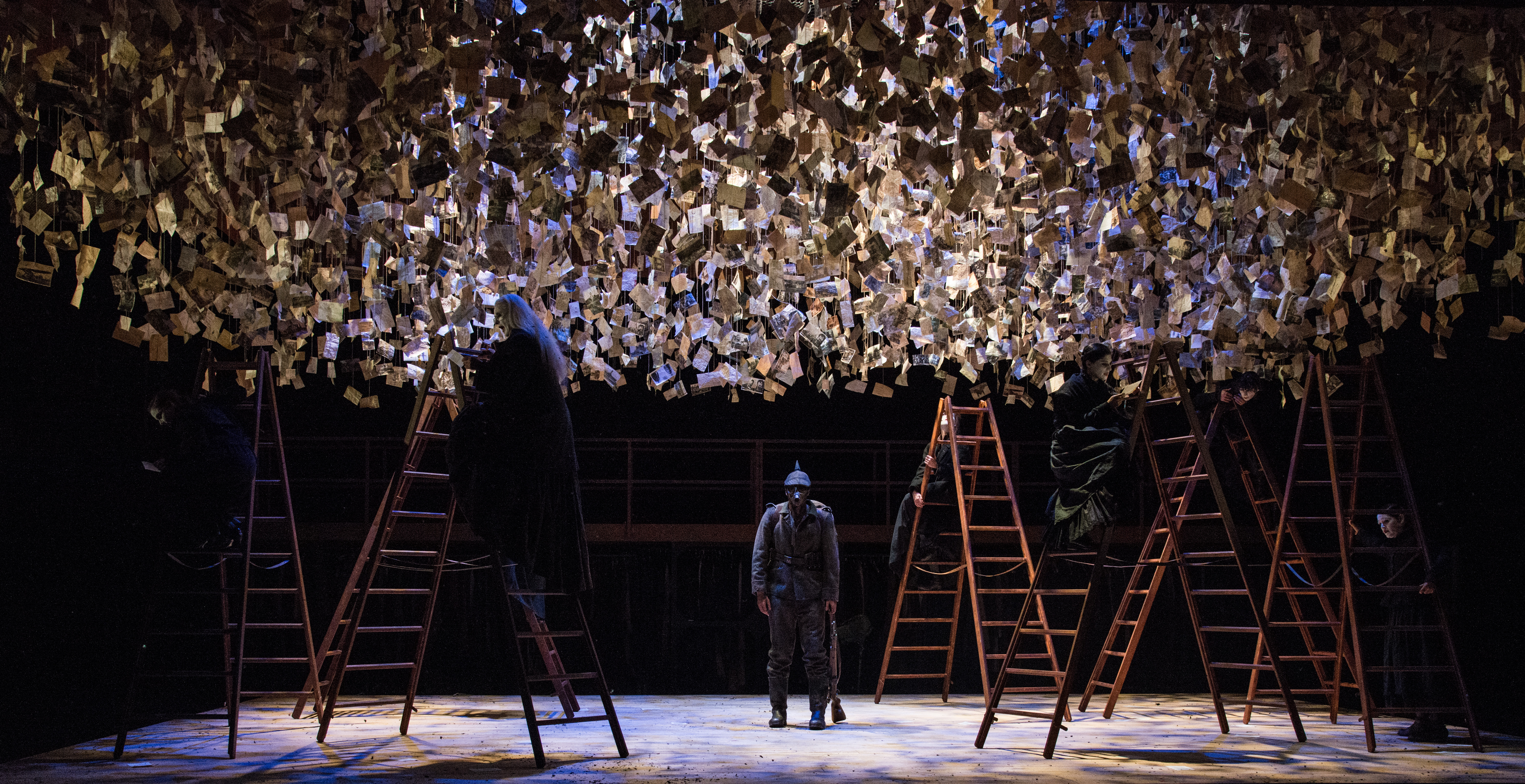
A 2014 staging

Don Juan Comes Back from the War (German: Don Juan kommt aus dem Krieg) is a 1936 play by Ödön von Horvath. Set in late 1918 and with Don Juan as its central character, the play describes his disorientation on returning from the First World War as a war hero, his love for a woman who died in the war and his death on her grave. It was only premiered in 1952.

== Notable productions ==
- Director Gadi Roll directed Don Juan Comes Back from the War at the Belgrade Theatre in 2007. The production starred actor Tom Burke.
- Playwright Duncan Macmillan adapted Don Juan Comes Back from the War for the National Theatre Studio and Finborough Theatre in 2012. The production was directed by Andrea Ferran as part of the Leverhulme Emerging Directors Award.
- Director Andreas Kriegenburg staged the play for Salzburger Festspiele in 2014.
