= Harry Dacre =

English songwriter (1857–1922)

- Dacre with bicycle (reference to Daisy Bell)

Background information
- Also known as: Henry Decker
- Born: Frank Dean; September 1857; Isle of Man
- Died: 16 July 1922 (aged 64) London, England
- Occupations: Songwriter, music publisher

Daisy Bell
1894 recording by the Edison Phonograph Company on brown wax cylinder of Edward M. Favor singing "Daisy Bell"

Harry Dacre, the pen-name of Frank Dean (September 1857 – 16 July 1922), was a British songwriter best known for his composition "Daisy Bell (Bicycle Built For Two)".

== Biography ==
Dean was born on the Isle of Man, where he was baptised on 6 September 1857. He moved to Manchester, and then to Preston, Lancashire around 1882. He decided to make a career in songwriting, and used the pseudonyms Harry Dacre and Henry Decker (which some sources state was his birth name). He later claimed to have sold some 600 songs in the first two years of his career, but his first popular success was with the song "The Ghost of Benjamin Binns", which was first sung by Harry Randall in Brighton in 1885. Claiming that the stress of constant songwriting was affecting his health, he emigrated to Australia, where he stayed for four years before returning to England and then leaving for America in 1891.

He took with him an early version of the song "Daisy Bell", and a bicycle on which he had to pay import duty. Supposedly, his friend William Jerome told him that if he had brought a tandem he would have had to pay double, inspiring Dacre to rewrite the words of his song to refer to a "bicycle built for two". While in New York, he persuaded singer Katie Lawrence to perform the song when she appeared in London in 1892. The song soon became popular in London music halls, and then a worldwide hit.

Dacre returned to London, and in 1895 set up his own publishing house, Frank Dean and Co. He continued to write successful songs, including "Katie O'Connor" (1891); "I Can't Think of Nuthin' Else But You, Lulu" (1896); and "I'll Be Your Sweetheart" (1899), which became a popular success performed by Lil Hawthorne. When it became clear that the law could do little to prevent the pirating of sheet music, Dacre withdrew from the music business for several years, returning only when T. P. O'Connor's proposals were enacted in the 1906 Musical Copyright Act.

Thereafter, Dacre lived in comfort in Langham Place in London. He died there in 1922.
