= Tales from Hollywood (play) =

Play by Christopher Hampton

- Original language: English
- Written by: Christopher Hampton
- Subject: a portrait of Europe's literary emigres in 1930s-40s Hollywood
- Genre: Drama
- Setting: Hollywood

Premiere
- Date: 1982
- Place: Mark Taper Forum; Los Angeles

Tales from Hollywood is a 1982 play by Christopher Hampton. The plot describes the lives of German literary refugees who fled Nazi Germany and their attempts to survive in Hollywood. The first act covers the period from 1938 to 1941 and the second act from 1942 to 1950. The play is narrated by Ödön von Horváth who in real life died in 1938 in a freak accident. Through von Horváth, the audience is introduced to many famous historical figures such as Bertolt Brecht, Lion Feuchtwanger, Johnny Weissmuller, Greta Garbo, Thomas Mann, his brother Heinrich Mann, and Heinrich’s alcoholic wife Nelly. Von Horváth meets and marries a Jewish writer named Helen Schwartz. He confesses to her that he was a member of the Nazi Writers' Union in the 1930s and after she leaves for New York he drowns in a swimming pool accident.

Hampton has translated several of Horváth's plays, and the title echoes the most famous of these: Tales from the Vienna Woods.

Tales from Hollywood premiered at the Mark Taper Forum in 1982 and at London’s National Theatre in 1983. It was made into a TV movie in 1992, directed by Howard Davies, with Jeremy Irons as Ödön von Horváth, Charles Durning as Charles Money, Alec Guinness as Heinrich Mann, and Elizabeth McGovern as Helen Schwartz.
