= Lawrence Thornton =

American writer (born 1937)

Lawrence Thornton (born 1937) is an American novelist and critic living in Claremont, California. His best-known novel, Imagining Argentina, employs the methods of magic realism to tell a story of the Dirty War (1976–1983). This novel, along with Naming the Spirits and Tales from the Blue Archives, makes up the Argentina Trilogy.

His work, published in 18 languages, is frequently taught in schools and universities. In 2003 a film was made of Imagining Argentina by Christopher Hampton starring Antonio Banderas, Emma Thompson and Claire Bloom. In 1996, Zorongo Flamenco, a Minneapolis-based flamenco troupe, staged a flamenco version of the novel that featured an international cast of dancers and singers. In addition to writing six novels, he is the author of a non-fiction study of modern fiction, Unbodied Hope, as well as scholarly articles in PMLA, Comparative Literature, American Literature, Modern Fiction Studies and other learned journals. During the 1990s he was a regular reviewer for The New York Times Book Review.

== Biography ==
After graduating from high school, Thornton attended the University of California, Santa Barbara, earning a B.A. in 1960. He is the father of Shelley L. Thornton-Stauffer born 1963.

He returned for an M.A. in 1967 and began working with Hugh Kenner who directed his Ph.D. dissertation (1973). He met Toni Clark in 1966 and they married in 1969. He taught at Montana State University from 1974 to 1984 when he left for a position at UCLA. After Imagining Argentina was published in 1987, he abandoned scholarship and concentrated solely on fiction. Since then, he has taught creative writing at UC Santa Barbara, UC Irvine, and Pomona College before retiring in 2009.

== Awards ==
- Gold Medal, Commonwealth Club of California 1996
- California Arts Council Artists' Fellowship 1993
- National Endowment for the Arts Fellowship 1989
- John Simon Guggenheim Fellowship 1988
- PEN/Hemingway Foundation Award 1987
- Silver Medal, Commonwealth Club of California 1987
- Finalist, PEN/Faulkner Award 1987
- PEN Center USA West Award for Best Novel of 1987
- Shirley Collier Award in Fiction UCLA 1987
- American Council of Learned Societies Grant 1984
- National Endowment for the Humanities Fellowship 1975, 1979, 1980

== Works ==
- Sailors on the Inward Sea, Free Press 2004
- Tales from the Blue Archives, Doubleday 1997
- Naming the Spirits, Doubleday 1995
- Ghost Woman, Ticknor & Fields 1992
- Under the Gypsy Moon, Doubleday 1990
- Imagining Argentina, Doubleday 1987
- Unbodied Hope: Narcissism and the Modern Novel, Bucknell University Press 1984
