= Imagining Argentina =

Book by Lawrence Thornton

- First edition
- Author: Lawrence Thornton
- Language: English
- Subject: Argentina's Dirty War
- Genre: Drama
- Publisher: Doubleday
- Publication date: 1987
- Publication place: United States
- Pages: 240 pp
- ISBN: 0-385-24027-9
- OCLC: 15316974
- Dewey Decimal: 813/.54 19
- LC Class: PS3570.H6678 I4 1987

Imagining Argentina (1987) is a novel by American author Lawrence Thornton, about the Dirty War in 1970s Argentina, during which the military government abducted and "disappeared" suspected opposition activists. It was nominated for the PEN/Faulkner Award for Fiction.

== Plot summary ==
Cecilia, a dissident journalist in Buenos Aires, is kidnapped by the secret police, likely to join the ranks of the "disappeared." The city is the center of opposition to the military dictatorship during its Dirty War in the 1970s against opponents. Her husband Carlos, a theater director, searches frantically for her and others through "imagining" their fates in prisons and cells.

== Reception ==
The novel was highly praised. It was nominated for the PEN/Faulkner Award for Fiction.

== Adaptations ==
In 2003, the novel was adapted as a film of the same name, written and directed by British playwright and director Christopher Hampton.
