= Dichotic pitch =

Pitch heard due to binaural processing

In Audiology, dichotic pitch (or the dichotic pitch phenomenon) is a pitch heard due to binaural processing, when the brain combines two noises presented simultaneously to the ears. In other words, it cannot be heard when the sound stimulus is presented monaurally (to one ear) but, when it is presented binaurally (simultaneously, to both ears) a sensation of a pitch can be heard. The binaural stimulus is presented to both ears through headphones simultaneously, and is the same in several respects except for a narrow frequency band that is manipulated. The most common variation is the Huggins Pitch, which presents white-noise that only differ in the interaural phase relation over a narrow range of frequencies. For humans, this phenomenon is restricted to fundamental frequencies lower than 330 Hz and extremely low sound pressure levels. Experts investigate the effects of the dichotic pitch on the brain. For instance, there are studies that suggested it evokes activation at the lateral end of Heschl's gyrus.

== Overview ==
When continuous white noise (with a frequency content below about 2000 Hz) is presented by headphones to the left and right ear of a listener, binaurally, and given a particular interaural phase relationship between the left and right ear signals, a sensation of pitch (psychophysics) may be observed. Thus, stimulation of either ear alone gives rise to the sensation of white noise only, but stimulation of both ears together produces pitch. Therefore, as a special case of dichotic listening, such a pitch is called dichotic pitch or binaural pitch. Generally, a dichotic pitch is perceived somewhere in the head amidst the noisy sound filling the binaural space. To be more specific, the dichotic pitch is characterized by three perceptual properties: pitch value, timbre, and in-head position (lateralization). Experiments on the dichotic pitch were motivated in the context of the study of the pitch in general, and of the binaural system in particular, relevant for sound localization and separation of competing for sound sources (see cocktail party effect). In the past, various configurations of the dichotic pitch were studied and several auditory models were developed. However, no singular model has been developed that accounts for all aspects of the dichotic pitch, from how it is formed to the lateralization of the dichotic pitch.

== Variations ==
=== Pure tones ===
Huggins pitch and Binaural edge pitch elicit a pure-tone like sound at singular frequency and are generated by creating an interaural phase shift at a narrow frequency band. This changes the point at which the sound wave that first reaches the ear, so the sound wave of the white noise stimulus reaches the ear at different points. In other words, the noise is decorrelated at that frequency.

==== Huggins Pitch (HP) ====
For HP to occur, the same white noise that is identical at all frequencies except for a narrow frequency band must be presented simultaneously to the ears. An all-pass filter is used at this narrow frequency band to create an interaural phase shift from 0 to 2π radians (sometimes referred to as a 360-degree phase shift).

==== Binaural edge pitch (BEP) ====
BEP is created by introducing an interaural phase shift from 0 to π radians (a 180-degree phase shift). It is best heard within the frequency range of 350–800 Hz.

=== Complex tones ===
Both the Fourcin pitch and Dichotic repetition pitch are complex tones. They are generated by creating large interaural delays in the binaural stimulus but differ in where these large interaural delays are applied.

==== Fourcin pitch (FP) ====
The FP is similar to pure tones in the sense that an interaural phase shift is needed; however, it also presents different stimuli, differing in their interaural delays, to each ear at the same time.

==== Dichotic repetition pitch (DRP) ====
The DRP presents the same stimuli with a singular large interaural delay binaurally, simultaneously, to the ears.

== Equalization–cancellation model ==
The equalization-cancellation (E-C) is a model that explains how the dichotic pitch is created, specifically, the Binaural edge pitch and the Huggins pitch, and is related to binaural unmasking.

The dichotic pitch stimulus is processed in a two-step process: equalization followed by the cancellation. Equalization is the process in which the binaural system modifies the differences in the interaural time delay, level and phase. That is the differences in the time the stimulus reaches the ears, the difference in the loudness and frequency to each ear, and the different phase of the wave when it reaches each ear, respectively. This allows the binaural system to subtract out what was perfectly correlated in the broadband noise. What is left is the interaural phase shift created at the narrow frequency band, the only part of the broadband noise that was decorrelated. The results of E-C is what is heard as the HP and BEP.

More specifically, the BEP is created as the E-C process creates a central spectrum with a sharp edge and a high-pass or low-pass sound where the BEP is heard.

== Lateralization ==
It was found that the characteristics of the white noise stimulus influences where Huggins pitch is lateralized. This includes the centre frequency and interaural time delay of the white noise.

The half-period rule theorizes that the lateralization of the Huggins pitch depends on the difference in the time it takes for the noise to reach each ear, otherwise known as the interaural time delay. However, this model does not accurately account for the lateralization of the dichotic pitch under all circumstances.

== Pitch processing ==
Using the dichotic pitch, pitch processing in relation to Heschl's gyrus in the brain was studied. Using various pitch evoking stimuli, fMRI scans in Hall & Plack's study found that multiple areas, including the Heschl's gyrus and, primarily, the planum temporale which is posterior of Heschl's gyrus, were activated by the pitch-evoking stimuli (the binaural stimulus) such as Huggins pitch.

The activation of Heschl's gyrus and the planum temporale was replicated by another study that used 2 dichotic pitches (Huggins pitch and Binaural band pitch) and pure tones which sound the same as the dichotic pitch but have dissimilar characteristics to study whether the activation depended on the characteristics of the pitch. The fMRI scans showed that the dichotic pitch and its corresponding pure tone activated the same areas: the lateral end of Heschl's gyrus and the lateral border of the Planum temporal. This reflects how Heschl's gyrus activation may not depend on the characteristics of the pitch but on the pitch itself. Huggins pitch was also found to affect the region bilaterally. The Planum temporale was also found to be more responsive to changes in the pitch such as those found in melodies.

== Clinical uses ==
=== In dyslexia ===
There have been many findings on the subject of dichotic pitch, showing that different disorders experience it in multiple different ways. Individuals with dyslexia seem to experience dichotic pitch in a similar way to if they were trying to distinguish words and letters. Robert F. Dougherty and team, ran an experiment using both dyslexic and non-dyslexic children. The participants were given a melody to listen to and different tones were then played within the melody. The dyslexic children were able to decipher the higher-pitched tones but were unable to distinguish the lower notes from the background melody. It became apparent that the lower notes caused some sort of auditory and sensory problem for the dyslexic children that made it harder for their brain to sort out the information being sent to it.

=== Hearing impairment ===
Santurette and Dau compared the ability for hearing-impaired individuals to hear the dichotic pitch to non-hearing-impaired listeners. It was found that most hearing-impaired individuals were able to hear the dichotic pitch, but had more difficulty hearing it compared to non-hearing-impaired listeners. However, not all hearing-impaired participants, such as those with central auditory processing deficits, were able to hear the dichotic pitch. While this is only preliminary research, the researchers suggested that due to the differential ability for hearing-impaired individuals to perceive the dichotic pitch, this may make the dichotic pitch a useful tool for diagnosing hearing-impaired individuals.

=== ADHD ===
A study done by Bianca Pinheiro Lanzetta-Valdo and the team looked at children with the diagnosis of Attention Deficit Hyperactivity Disorder (ADHD) and dichotic pitch. At the beginning of the experiment, all of the children were at a base level of the medication methylphenidate, a stimulant that is used to try and calm individuals with ADHD. Over a 6-month period, the children were given auditory stimulation that consisted of white noise, and during this stimulation, they would be given physical, neurological, visual and auditory examinations, as well as biochemical tests to see if any improvement was made. Lanzetta-Valdo and collaborators did find any improvements in the participants over the 6 months in their different evaluations, but there are controversial results on this topic.

== Role of frequency shift detectors ==
Frequency shift detectors (FSDs) are hypothesized to play a role in linking sounds together so that one can perceive words and melodies. They detect when the pitch in noise increases and decreases.

Carcagno and colleagues studied whether FSDs could detect frequency changes in both dichotic pitches (binaural stimuli) and from the monaural stimulus. They used an up/down task which asked participants to discriminate between the direction of the frequency change. The dichotic pitch and monaural stimulus did not change the ability for participants to do the up/down task. The similar results obtained amongst the two trials led to the conclusion that FSDs are equally as sensitive to changes in frequency in the monaural and binaural stimulus. This also led to the conclusion that FSDs are located somewhere after the binaural convergence, the point where the auditory processing system combines the noise stimuli that has arrived at the ears.
