= Self Esteem discography =

- Studio albums: 3
- EPs: 1

The discography of British musician Self Esteem consists of three studio albums, one extended play, one soundtrack album and twenty-three singles.

== Studio albums ==
List of studio albums, with selected details, showing select chart positions
Title	Details	Peak chart positions	
Title	Details	UK	SCO
Compliments Please	Released: 1 March 2019; Label: Fiction; Formats: LP, digital download, streaming	—	24
Prioritise Pleasure	Released: 22 October 2021; Label: Fiction, Universal Music Group; Formats: LP, digital download, streaming	11	9
A Complicated Woman	Released: 25 April 2025; Label: Polydor; Formats: CD, LP, digital download, streaming	5	5
"—" denotes album did not chart in that territory.

== Soundtrack albums ==
Title	Details
Prima Facie (Original Theatre Soundtrack)	Released: 14 June 2022; Label: Universal Music Group; Formats: Digital download, streaming

== Extended plays ==
Title	Details
Cuddles Please	Released: 1 May 2020; Label: Universal Music Group; Formats: Digital download, streaming

== Singles ==
Title	Year	Peak chart positions	Album
Title	Year	EST Air.	Album
"Your Wife"	2017	*	Non-album singles
"Wrestling"	2018	*	Non-album singles
"Rollout"	2018	*	Non-album singles
"The Best"	2019	*	Non-album singles
"Girl Crush"	2019	*	Non-album singles
"All I Want for Christmas Is a Work Email"	2019	*	Non-album singles
"Favourite Problem"	2020	*	Cuddles Please
"I Do This All The Time"	2021	*	Prioritise Pleasure
"Prioritise Pleasure"	2021	*	Prioritise Pleasure
"How Can I Help You"	2021	*	Prioritise Pleasure
"Moody"	2021	*	Prioritise Pleasure
"You Forever"	2021	*	Prioritise Pleasure
"New York"	2022	*	Non-album single
"Fucking Wizardry"	2022	*	Prioritise Pleasure
"The 345"	2022	*	Prioritise Pleasure
"You Are So Beautiful"	2023	—	Non-album single
"You Can Get It If You Really Want"	2024	—	This Town
"True Colours" (with Becky Hill)	2024	—	Believe Me Now?
"Big Man" (with Moonchild Sanelly)	2024	—	Non-album singles
"Love Second Music First"	2024	—	Non-album singles
"Focus Is Power"	2025	—	A Complicated Woman
"69"	2025	—	A Complicated Woman
"If Not Now, It's Soon"	2025	78	A Complicated Woman
"Cheers to Me"	2025	—	A Complicated Woman
"—" denotes a recording that did not chart or was not released in that territory. "*" denotes the chart did not exist at that time.
