= Self Esteem (musician) =

English musician (born 1986)

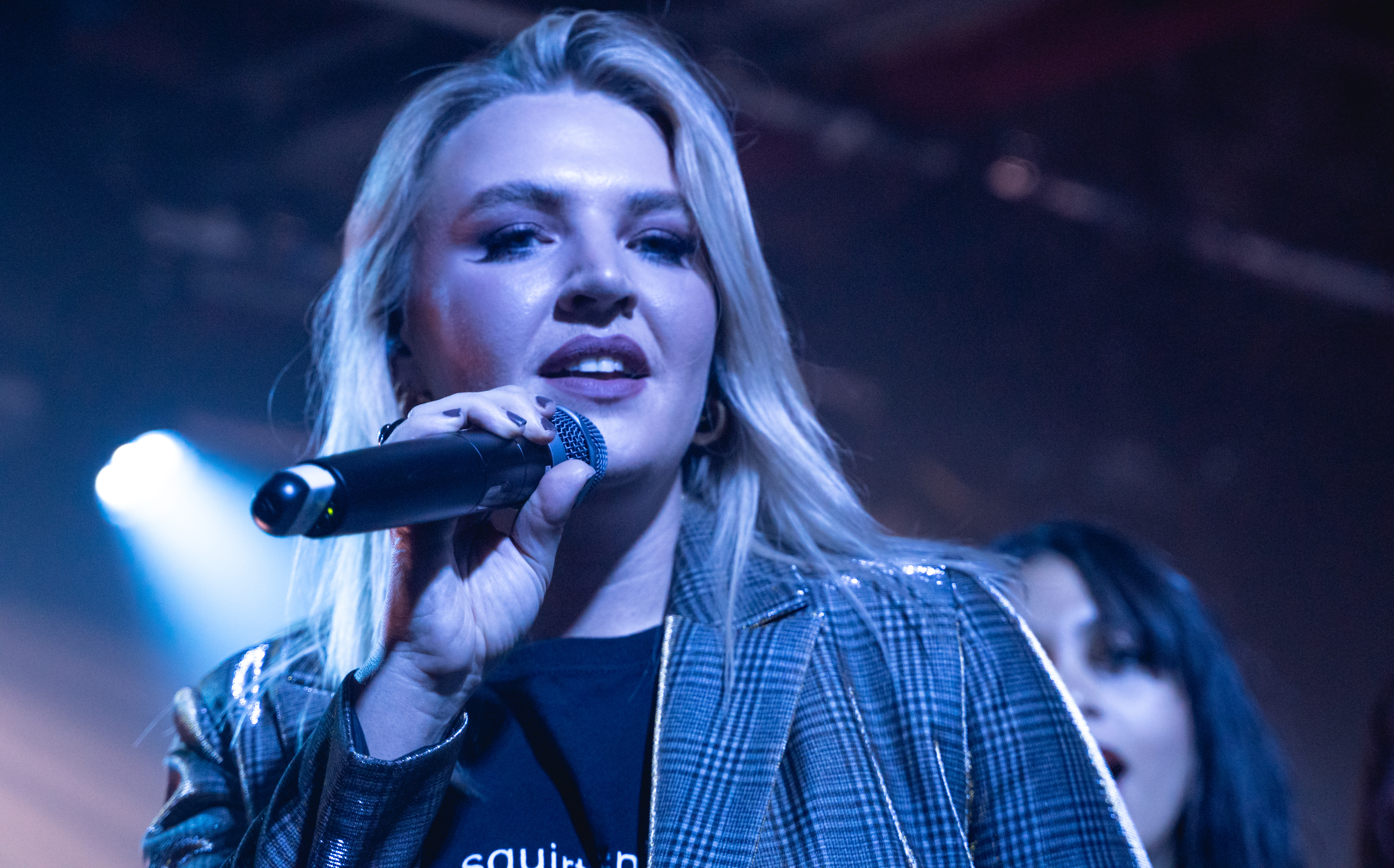
- Taylor performing in October 2021

Background information
- Born: Rebecca Lucy Taylor; 15 October 1986 (age 39); Rotherham, England
- Genres: Pop; experimental pop
- Occupations: Singer; songwriter; musician; composer; actress
- Instruments: Vocals; drums; guitar; keyboards
- Years active: 2006–present
- Labels: Polydor Records; Fiction Records; Kick + Clap
- Formerly of: Slow Club
- Website: www.selfesteem.love

Rebecca Lucy Taylor (born 15 October 1986), also known professionally as Self Esteem, is an English musician and actress. First known as one half of the band Slow Club, she launched a solo career as Self Esteem with the single "Your Wife" in 2017, followed by the studio albums Compliments Please in 2019, Prioritise Pleasure in 2021 and A Complicated Woman in 2025. A multi-instrumentalist, vocalist, songwriter and theatre composer, she won the 2021 BBC Music Introducing Artist of the Year Award and achieved a nomination for the Mercury Prize in 2022 with Prioritise Pleasure.

As an actress, Taylor has performed on stage and appeared in television series like I Hate Suzie and Smothered. From September 2023 to March 2024 she performed the lead role of Sally Bowles in the West End production of Cabaret, and is currently starring in the West End revival of Teeth 'n' Smiles.

== Early life ==
Taylor was born and grew up in Rotherham, England. Her father was a health and safety advisor and an amateur musician in a band, and her mother was a secretary. She attended Wales High School in Rotherham where she credits music teacher Antony Wright with teaching her to sing. Her main interests as a child were music, dance and cricket and she has described herself as a "choir nerd" while at school.

== Career ==
=== 2006–2017: music career before Self Esteem ===
Taylor was previously a member of folk duo Slow Club, which formed in Sheffield in 2006. The band consisted of multi-instrumentalists Charles Watson and Taylor, with Watson on the piano, Taylor on the drums, and both performing guitars and vocals. The band paused working in 2017, following an extensive tour to support their last album, owing to differing musical interests and Taylor feeling unfulfilled. Slow Club's final tour in the winter of 2016, and Taylor's dissatisfaction and unhappiness with the band, was captured in the documentary Our Most Brilliant Friends, directed by Piers Dennis and released in 2018.

=== 2015–2020: The appearance of Self Esteem and Compliments Please ===
Taylor started posting art and short notes on Instagram under the name Self Esteem in 2015. Prior to releasing music under the name, she used Self Esteem for a range of artistic projects including an exhibition of paintings and prints, and short films. Speaking about her stage name, Taylor has said she decided on the name around six years before she started using it, and that "I wanted to call it Sex Appeal or Self Esteem ... 'cause band names are bad, like, there's no good ones. But I probably should have just called it Rebecca Lucy Taylor". A big fan of Queen, she based her logo on Freddie Mercury's signature.

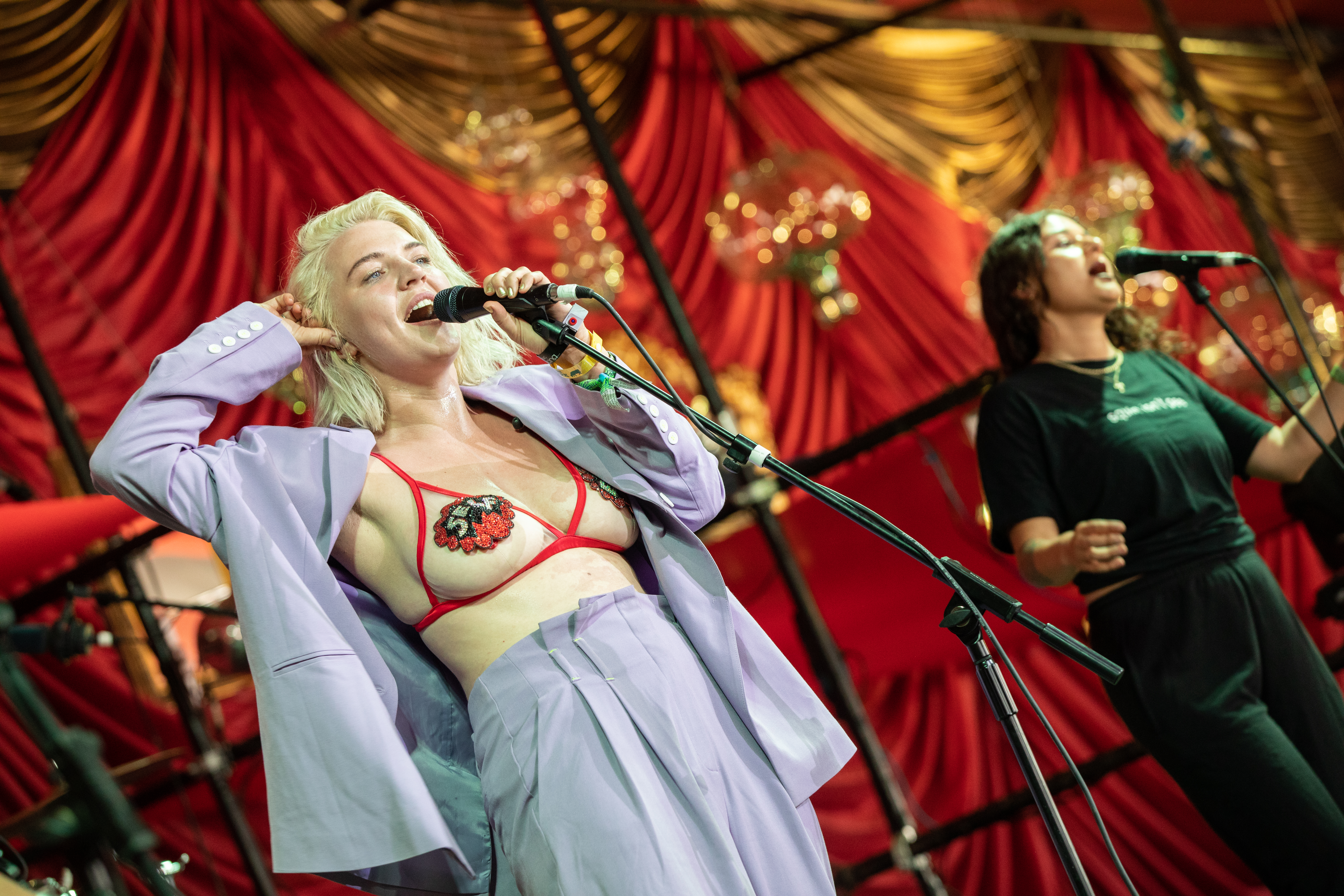
Self Esteem playing the Pussy Parlure stage at the 2019 Glastonbury Festival

Taylor was inspired with the confidence to pursue a solo career after watching RuPaul's Drag Race – "that whole ethos of not being ashamed to be confident or brilliant". She credits Jamie T with encouraging her to release her music after she shared some of her early solo work with him; his 2016 album Trick ends with a track called "Self Esteem". Taylor released her first music under the Self Esteem moniker, the single "Your Wife", in September 2017, with "OMG" as a B-side. The track was released on Kick + Clap, a label run by Django Django member Dave MacLean. Her first live show as Self Esteem was in October 2017 at Margate Arts Club. Taylor went on to feature on the Django Django track "Surface to Air", which appeared on the band's 2018 album Marble Skies.

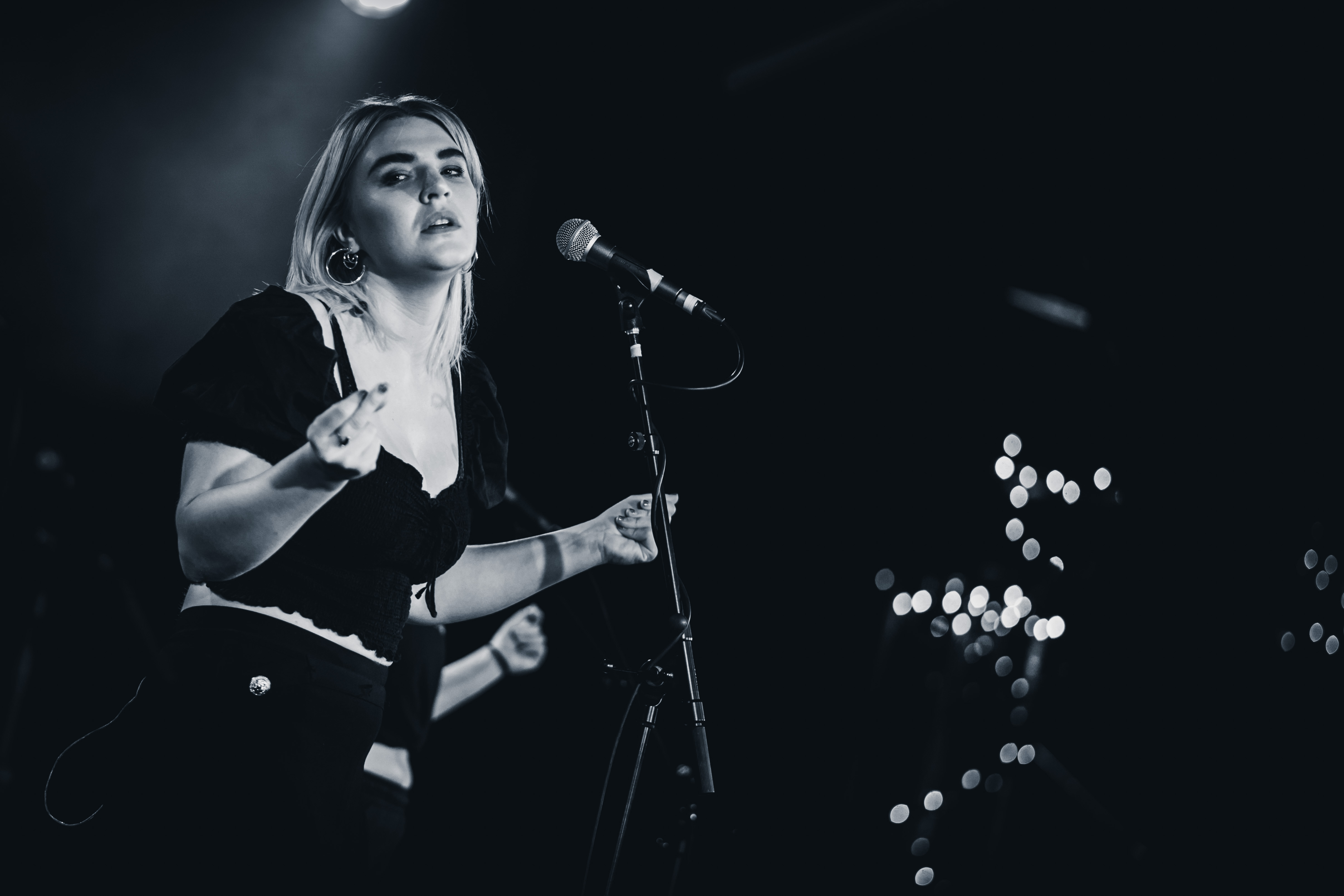
Taylor in January 2020

Tracks for the Self Esteem debut album Compliments Please were recorded from January to September 2018, and Taylor signed a solo deal with Fiction Records in April 2018. During the period of recording she played live at Latitude, Tramlines and a sold out show at Omeara Theatre London, followed by an eight-show UK tour in autumn 2018. The first single "Wrestling" was released in July 2018 followed by "Rollout" in September 2018, "The Best" in January 2019 and "Girl Crush" in February 2019. Compliments Please was released on 1 March 2019 on Fiction Records. It was well received critically, with an average rating of 80/100 according to Metacritic. A deluxe version was released in October 2019 with an additional track "Rooms". In March 2019 Self Esteem completed an 11-date UK tour in support of the album release and played at UK festivals including Glastonbury, British Summer Time and Latitude. In December 2019 she released a standalone single, "All I Want for Christmas Is a Work Email", recorded at Abbey Road Studios.

On 1 May 2020, Self Esteem released the Cuddles Please EP, with stripped down versions of tracks from Compliments Please – "Favourite Problem", "The Best" and "In Time" – along with a cover of "Miami Memory" by Alex Cameron. The EP features Neighbourhood Voices, a Sheffield-based upper voices choir. In the early months of the COVID-19 pandemic in 2020 she organised an online all-female festival, Pxssy Pandemique, to raise money for Women's Aid.

=== 2021–2023: Prioritise Pleasure ===
Much of the Self Esteem second album was written before the COVID-19 pandemic that caused intermittent public health restrictions in the UK from March 2020 onwards. These restrictions delayed its recording and release. The record was co-written, recorded and produced with Johan Hugo Karlberg, the producer who also worked on Compliments Please.

The first single from the album, "I Do This All the Time" was released in April 2021. Largely spoken word, and consequently compared to Baz Luhrmann's "Everybody's Free (To Wear Sunscreen)", Taylor said that "I went into this studio in Sheffield just to experiment, and I ended up building the backing track up, and just reading out my iPhone notes in a row".

The single was a huge critical and commercial success, and was praised by Tracey Thorn and by Jack Antonoff. It represented Taylor's first big music industry breakthrough. In a 2021 interview she said that she had previously lied about her age and said she was 25, and that it took her "a while to be proud" of breaking into the industry in her thirties.

In July, she released the title track and announced that the record, Prioritise Pleasure, would coincide with a UK tour in October of the same year. In August, Self Esteem released the third single, "How Can I Help You". Taylor directed the music videos for those singles, filming all three at the Almeida Theatre. In September, the single "Moody" was released. The video for "Moody" was directed by Louise Bhose and features comedian Alistair Green alongside Taylor. In October, Self Esteem released "You Forever", the final single preceding the album.

Prioritise Pleasure was released on 22 October 2021. The UK Self Esteem tour started on 6 November 2021 in Edinburgh.

The Guardian, The Sunday Times and Gigwise ranked Prioritise Pleasure as the best album of 2021. NME ranked the album as the fourth best of 2021. The Guardian named "I Do This All The Time" as the best song of 2021.

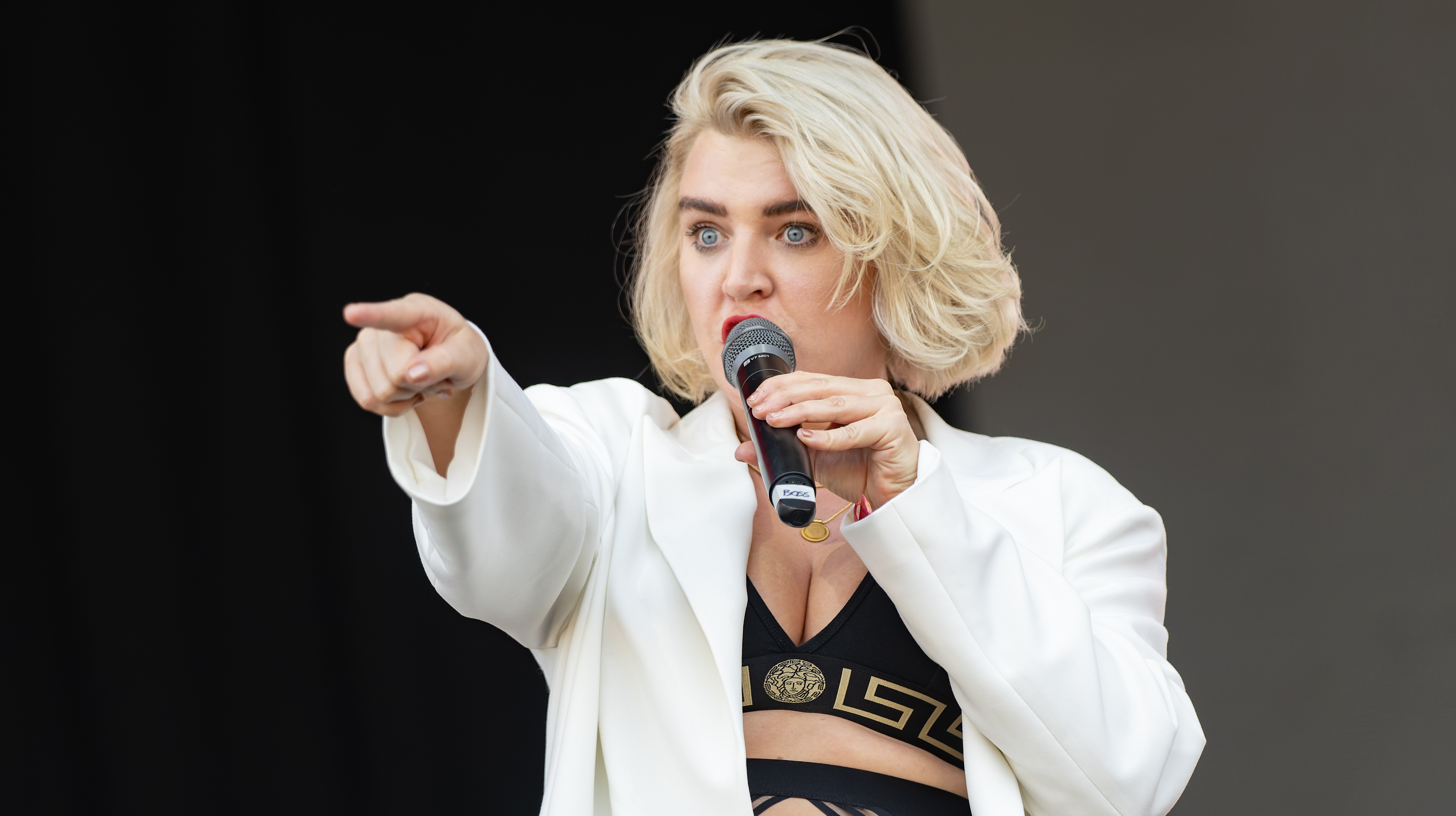
Taylor in August 2022

During 2022 Self Esteem played a sold-out Prioritise Pleasure tour and they also played 30 festivals. Taylor composed the soundtrack for the West End Production of Suzie Miller's play Prima Facie starring Jodie Comer, which was released on 14 June 2022. She described her connection with the production by saying the play "deals with similar issues" as Prioritise Pleasure, including heartbreak, sexism and misogyny. Prima Facie was awarded Best New Play at the 2023 Laurence Olivier Awards. In December 2022 she voiced the Christmas Campaign for Solace Women's Aid - 7 Years of Christmas. The campaign went on to win several awards and raise over 70,000 for the charity.

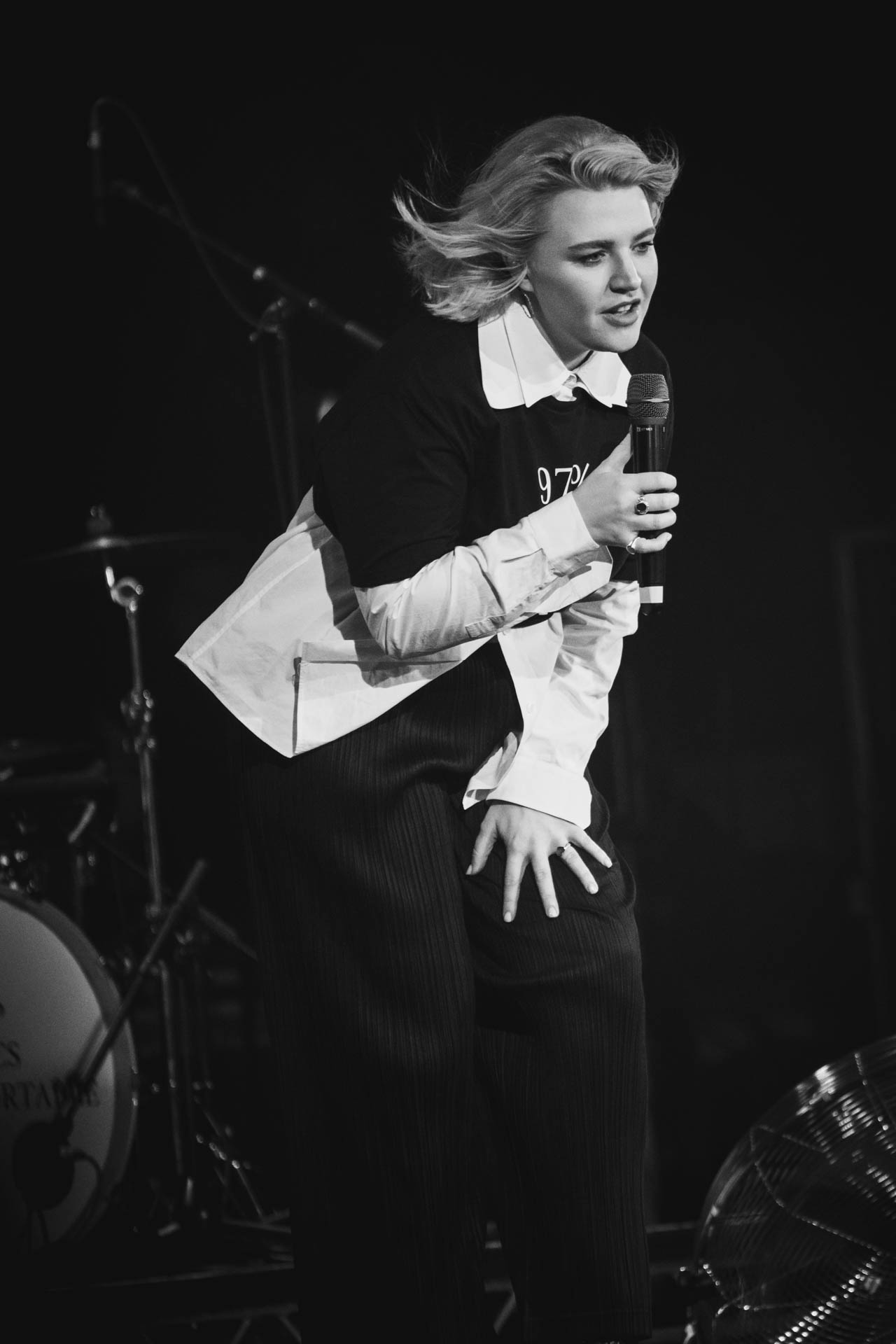
Taylor in January 2023

The 2023 live tour in support of Prioritise Pleasure, the I Tour This All The Time tour, was announced in March 2022 and originally consisted of 11 dates. Due to popularity of ticket sales, another 10 dates were added to the final tour which sold out before it commenced in February 2023. The tour played to 43,000 people including three nights at London's Eventim Apollo, three nights at Manchester's Albert Hall, and two nights at Taylor's home town O2 Academy Sheffield. During the UK tour Self Esteem performed two new, unreleased songs – "Mother" and "Love Second Music First".

Self Esteem played UK festivals in summer 2023 including Neighbourhood Weekender, Green Man, Bristol Sounds, Standon Calling, Parklife and Truck, and supported Blur at their Wembley Stadium gig on 8 July. On 21 July, Taylor performed at the opening night of the BBC Proms festival in Sage Gateshead, the BBC's first outside of London. Her performance consisted of 12 songs from her two solo albums, plus a cover of George Michael's "Praying for Time". The tracks were arranged for the Royal Northern Sinfonia by Robert Ames, who also served as conductor, and Matt Rogers. In September, Self Esteem headlined a tour-closing show – billed as the last of the Prioritise Pleasure era – at Don Valley Bowl in Sheffield.

A number of standalone songs, many collaborations, were released by Self Esteem during 2023. In February, Django Django released "Complete Me" which features Self Esteem on vocals, from their album Off Planet. In June, Self Esteem released an acoustic cover of "You Are So Beautiful", originally written and recorded by Billy Preston and popularised by Joe Cocker. With Craig Armstrong, Taylor recorded a cover of "Black Eyed Dog" for the Nick Drake covers compilation album, The Endless Coloured Ways: The Songs of Nick Drake, released in July 2023. Taylor was also one of the singers on the unofficial anthem for the England Women's World Cup team, "Call Me a Lioness".

=== 2025: A Complicated Woman ===
Taylor spent 2024 in the studio recording her third Self Esteem album, during which several standalone singles and collaborations were released as singles. She featured on a Becky Hill track "True Colours" from the 2024 album Believe Me Now? In June she released "Big Man" with South African artist Moonchild Sanelly. In September "Love Second Music First" - a song first performed on the latter dates of the Prioritise Pleasure tour - was released as a b-side to "Big Man". She also released a cover of "You Can Get It If You Really Want", recorded for the soundtrack to the BBC series This Town.

In an interview for the podcast series Talk Art in July 2022, Taylor discussed the demo for a new song that contains the refrain "I can't be arsed", a phrase also included in the video for "Moody", stating that "essentially, album three has begun now". Speaking about the budget constraints she has faced as a new artist, she has said that "I'm so glad I haven't achieved what I want to achieve quite yet, because imagine if I had access to an orchestra or a full choir. That's what excites me about album three". In September 2024, Taylor was reported as saying that her third album was 70% complete.

On 21 January 2025, Self Esteem released a new track "Focus Is Power" and announced her new album A Complicated Woman, released on 25 April 2025. "Focus Is Power" was originally written by Taylor during the coronavirus pandemic; the released version features House Gospel Choir and has co-writing credits for Johan Hugo, Taylor's long time collaborator, and Pale Jay. A Complicated Woman is Self Esteem's major label debut, released on Polydor. Also in 2025, she appeared in the video for Sparks single "Porcupine".

== Style and influences ==
Self Esteem's music is characterised by its prominent drum rhythms, female choral elements and powerful, precisely articulated lead vocals, often alongside organs, distorted guitars and string arrangements. Taylor has said "I love heavy beat and heavy bass, I love strings, I love choir, and I love big, cinematic sounds". Self Esteem has been described as pop, art pop, experimental pop and indie/alternative pop; Taylor herself has said that she dislikes it being described as "indie". Her lyrics and vocal delivery are central to the songs: she has been described as "one of the best lyricists of her generation" and as having live vocals "so clear and pure they could wake bears from hibernation". She writes songs on guitar before arranging them with other musicians. Taylor has cited a range of influences including Madonna, Destiny's Child, Rihanna, Outkast, Queen, Fleetwood Mac, Neil Young, Kate Bush, Max Richter, Arctic Monkeys, and Lady Gaga. Although she has worked with other musicians on Self Esteem, Taylor has used the project to channel her own undiluted ideas, in contrast to her experience with Slow Club where she felt she constantly had to compromise, saying "I hate this idea that compromise and collaboration is the only way to make something good".

Taylor's lyrics are typically written in direct, colloquial language: "All I care about are people and the things they do. I'm interested in horrible life, and lyrics are the horrible life bit for me". Lyrically she explores themes around relationships, self-criticism, sex, mental health, misogyny, objectification, female empowerment and feminism. Her lyrics are unusual in that they are self-critical and confessional, embracing and exploring her own shortcomings and mistakes, as well as those of others. They often contain reference to internet culture including texting, sexting and social media; in images and videos she is often pictured holding or using a mobile phone, and she frequently releases lines of lyrics or poetry on Instagram in the Apple Notes app.

"I'm obsessed with harmony and choral stuff, and a lot of what I write I think, this doesn't sound great now but when it's got four or five harmonies on it, it will. And, yeah, I proved myself right!"

— Rebecca Lucy Taylor, BBC Introducing X Abbey Road Studios, December 2019

Since they first started touring in 2018, the Self Esteem live band has featured Taylor on lead vocals, 2–3 dancing backing vocalists, a drummer and keyboard/bass player. Taylor has said that she began to be bored by live music performances, and became determined to put on an entertaining show with Self Esteem. The live shows are known for their energetic performances, with Taylor and her dancers performing choreographed routines throughout. Taylor has said that the Prioritise Pleasure tours were inspired by Madonna's 1990 Blond Ambition Tour, and other writers have drawn comparisons with Pussycat Dolls choreography. Since the release of Prioritise Pleasure, audience members have taken to barking at Self Esteem shows in homage to a voice note at the end of "I'm Fine" in which a woman describes herself and friends barking like dogs when approached by a group of men, as a form of self-protection.

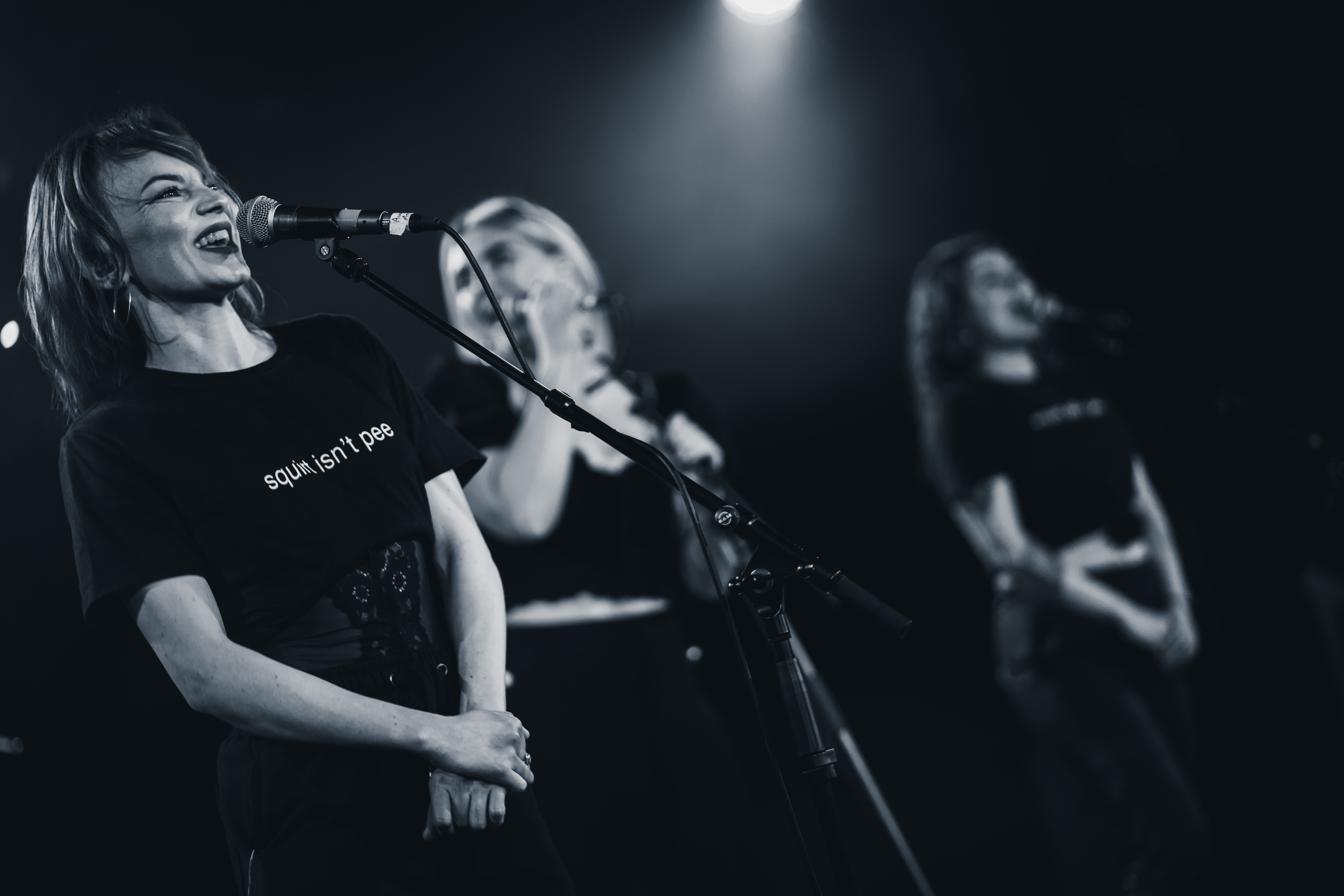
Levi Heaton and Marged Siôn (background) wearing matching "Squirt isn't pee" shirts, January 2020

Self Esteem members coordinate their clothing at live shows often wearing identical slogan t-shirts (see below) and on occasions in Sheffield Wednesday shirts. Taylor has worn notable outfits at Glastonbury performances – in 2019, a dress made from Boots Advantage (loyalty) cards, and in 2022 a corset with a bra shaped like the domes of Sheffield's Meadowhall shopping centre. In December 2023 she released a limited edition t-shirt depicting the Meadowhall corset, to raise money for breast cancer charity Breast Cancer Now.

Ten of Self Esteem's singles have been accompanied by music videos. Many of these have been directed by Piers Dennis who worked on the Slow Club documentary Our Most Brilliant Friends. The video for "The Best" was filmed on the set of an art installation by Taylor's good friend Lindsey Mendick. Videos for "How Can I Help You", "Prioritise Pleasure" and "I Do This All The Time" were filmed at Almeida Theatre and directed by Taylor.

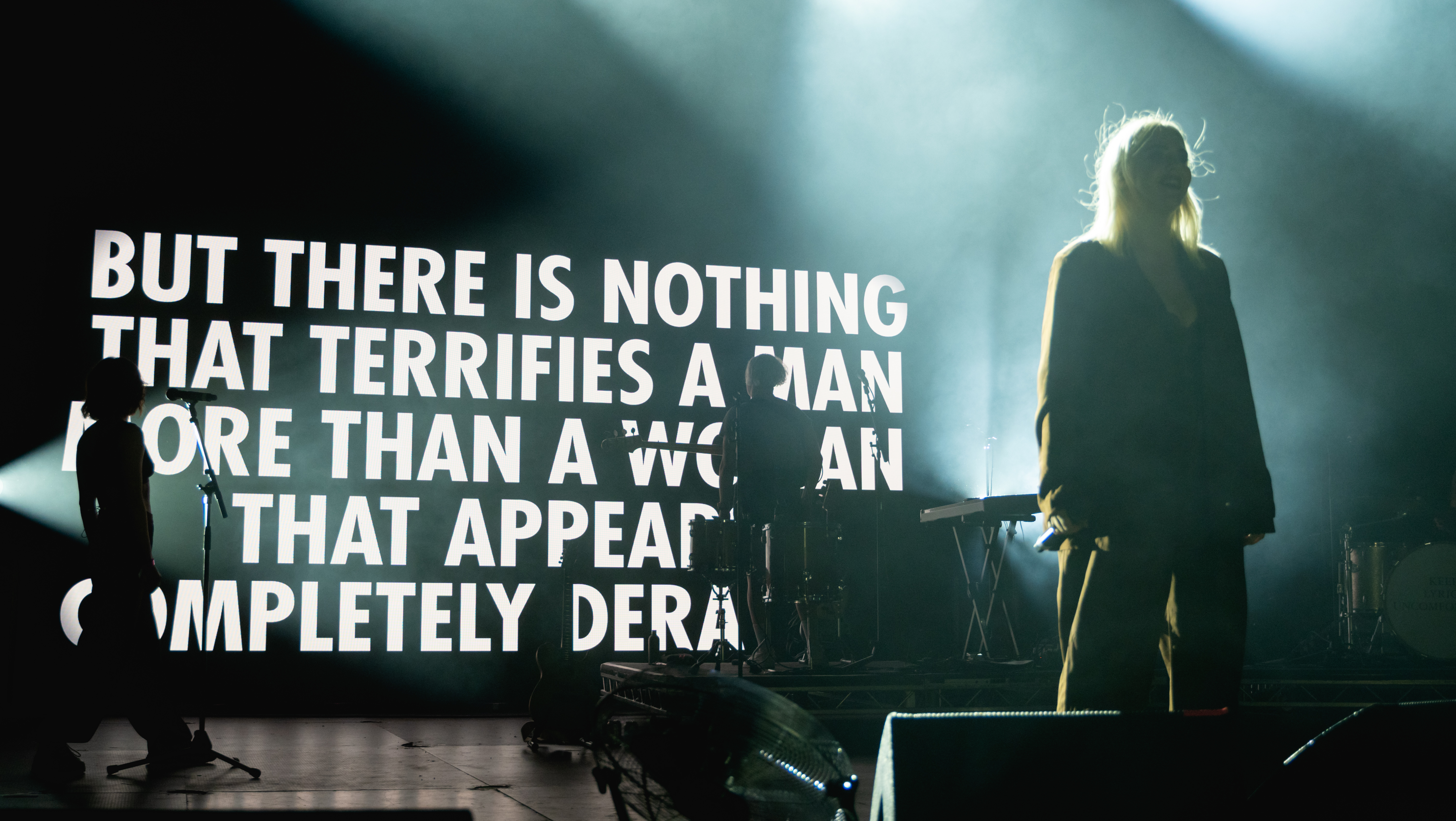
"I'm Fine" voice note, as stage backdrop, September 2021

Self Esteem makes use of recurrent slogans that appear on clothing worn by the band live and in videos, and shown on the live backdrop which is usually black with white capital letters. Some of these slogans derive from Self Esteem lyrics and others make related political and artistic statements. These include:

- "Prioritise Pleasure" – first seen on t-shirts worn by the band during the Compliments Please live shows; subsequently the title of the second album; often used as a live backdrop. She has emphasised that the message of "Prioritise Pleasure" as about valuing self worth and self love in the face of social expectations, pressures and fears faced by women, and "that not being indulgent and that not being selfish"
- "Believe Women" – worn on t-shirts by dancers Marged Siôn and Genesis Lynea in the video for "Rollout", a statement in support of women reporting their experience of sexual harassment, abuse and violence
- "Remember You Don't Owe Them Anything" – printed on the gatefold of Compliments Please; Taylor wears a t-shirt with this slogan in the video for "In Time"; features in the lyrics for "Girl Crush"; and printed in the credits of Prioritise Pleasure.
- "Keep Lyrics Uncomfortable" – featured on the bass drum skin on Self Esteem live gigs in 2021 and 2022
- "But there is nothing that terrifies a man more than a woman that appears completely deranged" – words from a voice note that appears at the end of "I'm Fine"
- "97%" – featured on a tie worn by Taylor on live TV shows including The Graham Norton Show and The Late Late Show with James Corden, and on a pin badge worn on her suit during the 2023 tour. The statistic refers to a YouGov survey in 2021 which found that 97% of UK women aged 18 to 24 years old had experienced sexual harassment
- "Let Me Be Gorgeous In Peace" – displayed on the bass drum skin during the 2023 tour, along with an image of Sarah Lancashire as Catherine Cawood; also a line from the unreleased track "Love Second"

== Personal life ==
Taylor has been a supporter of Sheffield Wednesday Football Club since a child, a club that her great-grandfather played for.

Taylor has spoken about how working with a therapist has improved her mental health, and its importance to the development of her career as Self Esteem.

In interviews Taylor has described herself as bisexual and has discussed how her sexuality relates to her music, characterising "Girl Crush" as a "bi-bop".

== Band personnel ==
Taylor has emphasised the importance of her collaborators on Self Esteem, saying "I like to think of [Self Esteem] as a sort of collective of people...I've got this real, like, family which is something I've always dreamed of."

=== Current live band ===
- Marged Siôn (backing vocals)
- Levi Heaton (backing vocals)
- Seraphina Simone (backing vocals)
- Mike Park (drums)

=== Previous live band members ===
- Kelli Blanchett (backing vocals)
- Sophie Galpin (backing vocals, keys, bass)

== Discography ==
- Compliments Please (2019)
- Prioritise Pleasure (2021)
- A Complicated Woman (2025)

== Awards and recognition ==
Taylor was made an honorary Doctor of Music at the University of Sheffield on 17 July 2023 "in recognition of her success in the music industry and public championing of inclusivity and diversity". She has also been recognised with a photographic portrait hung in the National Portrait Gallery in London.

Award	Year	Nominee(s)	Category	Result	Ref.
Attitude Awards	2021	Herself	Music Award	Won	
BBC Music Introducing	2021	Herself	Artist of the Year	Won	
Brit Awards	2022	Herself	British Breakthrough Act	Nominated	
British LGBT Awards	2024	Herself	Celebrity	Nominated	
Ivor Novello Awards	2025	Herself	Visionary Award	Won	
Ivor Novello Awards	2026	"I Do and I Don't Care"	Best Contemporary Song	Pending	
Ivor Novello Awards	2026	"Focus Is Power"	Best Song Musically and Lyrically	Pending	
Mercury Prize	2022	Prioritise Pleasure	Album of the Year	Nominated	
Music Week Awards	2024	The Endless Coloured Ways: The Songs of Nick Drake	Catalogue Marketing Campaign	Nominated	
Music Week Awards	2026	I Came By Train	Music & Brand Partnership	Pending	
NME Awards	2022	Herself	Best Live Act	Nominated	
NME Awards	2022	Prioritise Pleasure	Best Album In The World	Nominated	
NME Awards	2022	Prioritise Pleasure	Best Album By A UK Artist	Nominated	
Q Awards	2019	Herself	Best Breakthrough Act	Nominated	
Rolling Stone UK Awards	2025	Herself	The Live Act Award	Nominated	
South Bank Sky Arts Awards	2022	Prioritise Pleasure	Pop Award	Nominated	

== Acting ==
Earlier in her career, Taylor acted in live and filmed sketches for the comedy group Seldom Differ. The group subsequently produced a short promotional mockumentary interview for Compliments Please.

Taylor appeared in series two of I Hate Suzie in 2022, which starred Billie Piper as the title character Suzie Pickles. She featured as Farrah in the 2023 Sky TV comedy series Smothered and appeared in the Film4 romance film Layla (2024).

Taylor played Sally Bowles in the West End musical revival of Cabaret at the Kit Kat Club (Playhouse Theatre) from 25 September 2023 to 9 March 2024 opposite Jake Shears as the Emcee.

From 13 March to 6 June 2026, Taylor will be playing Maggie Frisby in the West End revival of Teeth 'n' Smiles by David Hare at the Duke of York's Theatre.

== Television appearances ==
Self Esteem has appeared on major TV entertainment shows in the UK and the US including Later...with Jools Holland, The Graham Norton Show, Jools' Annual Hootenanny and The Late Late Show with James Corden.

A fan of the UK TV show Taskmaster, Taylor appeared in the 2023 New Year's episode in which she came joint second to winner Sir Mo Farah. Taylor has also appeared on Never Mind the Buzzcocks and Celebrity Gogglebox. In March 2024' she appeared as a guest judge on series 2 of RuPaul's Drag Race: UK vs. the World, a long held ambition of hers.

== Bibliography ==
- Self Esteem (2021)
- A Complicated Woman (forthcoming, due to be published October 2025)
