= NME Awards 2022 =

Edition of music award ceremony

2022 NME Awards
- Date: 2 March 2022
- Location: O2 Academy Brixton, London
- Hosted by: Daisy May Cooper and Lady Leshurr
- Website: nme.com

The 2022 NME Awards, also named BandLab NME Awards 2022, were held on 2 March 2022 at the O2 Academy Brixton in London and were hosted by actress Daisy May Cooper and rapper Lady Leshurr. The nominations were announced on 27 January 2022. Sam Fender, Rina Sawayama, Griff with Sigrid, Berwyn, Chvrches with Robert Smith, FKA Twigs and Bring Me The Horizon performed on the night. The nominations of categories focusing on Asian and Australian music were announced on 15 December 2021. The winners were announced on 11 January 2022 and set to compete in the global categories.

American singer Halsey received the Innovation Award, while American songwriter and producer Jack Antonoff received the Songwriter Award. English singer FKA twigs received the Godlike Genius Award.

== Winners and nominees ==
Best Album in the World	Best Album by a UK Artist
Seventeen Going Under – Sam Fender; Smiling with No Teeth – Genesis Owusu; Conflict of Interest – Ghetts; If I Can't Have Love, I Want Power – Halsey; Blue Banisters – Lana Del Rey; Sometimes I Might Be Introvert – Little Simz; Prioritise Pleasure – Self Esteem; Nature of Things – Subsonic Eye; Call Me If You Get Lost – Tyler, the Creator; Blue Weekend – Wolf Alice	Seventeen Going Under – Sam Fender; Conflict of Interest – Ghetts; Sometimes I Might Be Introvert – Little Simz; Prioritise Pleasure – Self Esteem; Blue Weekend – Wolf Alice
Best Song in the World	Best Song by a UK Artist
"Solar Power" – Lorde; "Butter" – BTS; "Good Ones" – Charli XCX; "How Not to Drown" – Chvrches & Robert Smith; "Good 4 U" – Olivia Rodrigo; "Just for Me" – PinkPantheress; "Seventeen Going Under" – Sam Fender; "Stay" – The Kid Laroi & Justin Bieber; "Omomo Punk" – Warren Hue; "Chaise Longue" – Wet Leg	"How Not to Drown" – Chvrches & Robert Smith; "Good Ones" – Charli XCX; "Just for Me" – PinkPantheress; "Seventeen Going Under" – Sam Fender; "Chaise Longue" – Wet Leg
Best Solo Act in the World	Best Solo Act from the UK
Burna Boy; Arlo Parks; Billie Eilish; Dave; Little Simz; Pyra; Rina Sawayama; Sam Fender; Tkay Maidza; The Weeknd	Little Simz; Arlo Parks; Dave; Rina Sawayama; Sam Fender
Best Band in the World	Best Band from the UK
Fontaines D.C.; Amyl and the Sniffers; Ben&Ben; Bring Me the Horizon; Chvrches; Glass Animals; Haim; Måneskin; Nova Twins; Wolf Alice	Bring Me the Horizon; Chvrches; Glass Animals; Nova Twins; Wolf Alice
Best New Act in the World	Best New Act from the UK
Olivia Rodrigo; Bad Boy Chiller Crew; Berwyn; Bree Runway; Inhaler; King Stingray; Shye; Tems; Wet Leg; Yard Act	Berwyn; Bad Boy Chiller Crew; Bree Runway; Wet Leg; Yard Act
Best Mixtape	Best Collaboration
The Walls Are Way Too Thin – Holly Humberstone; Tape 2/Fomalhaut – Berwyn; Wild West – Central Cee; Caprisongs – FKA Twigs; To Hell with It – PinkPantheress	"Head on Fire" – Griff x Sigrid; "Family Ties" – Baby Keem x Kendrick Lamar; "My Universe" – Coldplay x BTS; "Tears in the Club" – FKA Twigs x The Weeknd; "Chosen Family" – Rina Sawayama x Elton John
Best Live Act	Best Producer
Rina Sawayama; Bleachers; Bring Me the Horizon; Idles; Little Simz; Megan Thee Stallion; Self Esteem; Tomorrow X Together; Wizkid; Yungblud	Nia Archives; Arca; Fred Again; India Jordan; Travis Barker
Best Festival in the World	Best Festival in the UK
Life Is Beautiful; All Points East; Austin City Limits; Fuji Rock; Exit Festival; Green Man; Reading & Leeds; Riot Fest; TRNSMT; Wireless	Reading & Leeds; All Points East; Green Man; TRNSMT; Wireless
Best Small Festival	Best Festival Headliner
Wide Awake; End of the Road; Live at Leeds; Lost Village; Mighty Hoopla	Wolf Alice; Billie Eilish; Liam Gallagher; Megan Thee Stallion; Tyler, the Creator
Best Film	Best TV Series
Last Night in Soho; Licorice Pizza; Promising Young Woman; Sound of Metal; The Harder They Fall	Feel Good; It's a Sin; Sex Education; Stath Lets Flats; We Are Lady Parts
Best Film Actor	Best TV Actor
Alana Haim; Benedict Cumberbatch; Jonathan Majors; Riz Ahmed; Thomasin McKenzie	Aisling Bea; Mae Martin; Ncuti Gatwa; Olly Alexander; Zendaya
Best Reissue	Best Music Film
Red (Taylor's Version) – Taylor Swift; Nevermind – Nirvana; ATLiens – Outkast; Kid A Mnesia – Radiohead; Let It Be – The Beatles	The Sparks Brothers; Billie Eilish: The World's a Little Blurry; If I Can't Have Love, I Want Power; Knebworth 1996; Summer of Soul
Best Music Video	Best Music Book
"Wake Me Up" – Foals; "Happier Than Ever" – Billie Eilish; "Montero (Call Me by Your Name)" – Lil Nas X; All Too Well: The Short Film – Taylor Swift; "Chaise Longue" – Wet Leg	Tenement Kid – Bobby Gillespie; The Storyteller: Tales of Life and Music – Dave Grohl; Crying in H Mart – Michelle Zauner; The Lyrics: 1956 to the Present – Paul McCartney; Music Is History – Questlove
Best Podcast	Game of the Year
Table Manners; Disgraceland; Grounded with Louis Theroux; Songs to Live By; Wheel of Misfortune	Metroid Dread; Deathloop; Halo Infinite; Hitman 3; Unpacking
Indie Game of the Year	Best Game Development Studio
Unpacking; Cruelty Squad; Overboard!; The Artful Escape; The Forgotten City	Double Fine; Arkane Studios; Black Matter; IO Interactive; Xbox Game Studios
Best Ongoing Game	Best Audio in a Game
Final Fantasy XIV; Apex Legends; Escape from Tarkov; Fortnite; Genshin Impact	Forza Horizon 5; Deathloop; Marvel's Guardians of the Galaxy; The Artful Escape; Psychonauts 2

=== Asia and Australia ===
Asia
Best Album by an Asian Artist	Best Song by an Asian Artist
Nature of Things – Subsonic Eye (Singapore); Huminga – Zild (Philippines); Momo's Mysterious Skin – BAP. (Indonesia); Pebble House, Vol. 1: Kuwaderno – Ben&Ben (Philippines); Punk Gong – No Good (Malaysia)	"Omomo Punk" – Warren Hue (Indonesia); "Honey, Baby" – Grrrl Gang (Indonesia); "Lotus" – FORCEPARKBOIS (Malaysia); "Yellow Fever" – Pyra, Ramengvrl & Yayoi Daimon (Thailand / Indonesia / Japan)
Best Band from Asia	Best Solo Act from Asia
Ben&Ben (Philippines); Lomba Sihir (Indonesia); No Good (Malaysia); Senyawa (Indonesia); Subsonic Eye (Singapore)	Pyra (Thailand); Pamungkas (Indonesia); Reese Lansangan (Philippines); Zild (Philippines)
Best New Act from Asia
Shye (Singapore); Alec Orachi (Thailand); Ena Mori (Philippines); The Filters (Malaysia); Warren Hue (Indonesia)
Australia
Best Album by an Australian Artist	Best Song by an Australian Artist
Smiling with No Teeth – Genesis Owusu; 3 – Ngaiire; Comfort to Me – Amyl and the Sniffers; Gela – Baker Boy; I Feel Better But I Don't Feel Good – Alice Skye	"Stay" – The Kid LAROI & Justin Bieber; "Damaged" – Miiesha; "Get Me Out" – King Stingray; "Kid" – Tkay Maidza & Baby Tate; "The Man Himself" – Gang of Youths
Best Band from Australia	Best Solo Act from Australia
Amyl and the Sniffers; The Goon Sax; Hiatus Kaiyote; King Stingray; Middle Kids	Tkay Maidza; Baker Boy; Genesis Owusu; Jaguar Jonze; The Kid LAROI
Best New Act from Australia
King Stingray; Budjerah; Ruby Fields; Sycco; Youngn Lipz

== Special awards ==
Godlike Genius Award

- FKA Twigs

Innovation Award

- Halsey

Songwriter Award

- Jack Antonoff

Hero of the Year

- Tomorrow X Together

Villain of the Year

- Jacob Rees-Mogg
