= Prima Facie (film) =

2026 by Susanna White

- Theatrical release poster
- Directed by: Susanna White
- Screenplay by: Suzie Miller
- Based on: Prima Facie by Suzie Miller
- Produced by: Greer Simpkin; Kevin Loader; David Jowsey
- Starring: Cynthia Erivo; Daniel Ings; Toheeb Jimoh; Elizabeth Dulau; Harry Treadaway; Khalid Abdalla; Elliot Levey; Noma Dumezweni; Simon Russell Beale
- Cinematography: Mike Eley
- Edited by: Justine Wright
- Music by: Isobel Waller-Bridge
- Production companies: Bunya Productions; Embankment Films
- Distributed by: Sony Pictures Releasing International
- Release dates: 13 September 2026 (TIFF); 13 November 2026 (United Kingdom); 14 January 2027 (Australia)
- Running time: 109 minutes
- Countries: United Kingdom; Australia
- Language: English

Prima Facie is a 2026 legal drama film directed by Susanna White and adapted by Suzie Miller from her 2019 stage play. An international co-production between the United Kingdom and Australia, it stars Cynthia Erivo, who also serves as an executive producer, with Daniel Ings, Toheeb Jimoh, Elizabeth Dulau, Harry Treadaway, Khalid Abdalla, Elliot Levey, Noma Dumezweni, and Simon Russell Beale appearing in supporting roles.

Prima Facie premiered at the Toronto International Film Festival on 13 September 2026, was released in the United Kingdom on 13 November, and will be released in Australia on 14 January 2027. It received mixed reviews from critics.

== Synopsis ==
Tessa Ensler has risen from a working-class background to be a confident, brilliant and successful defence barrister who has built her career defending clients including men accused of sexual assault. However, her confidence is shaken and her faith in the legal system she has dedicated her life to is profoundly challenged one night by the actions of a colleague.

== Cast ==
- Cynthia Erivo as Tessa Ensler
- Daniel Ings as Julian Brooks
- Toheeb Jimoh as Johnny
- Elizabeth Dulau as Alice Sommers
- Harry Treadaway as Adam
- Khalid Abdalla as Sam Ibrahim KC
- Elliot Levey as Thomas Buckley
- Noma Dumezweni as June
- Simon Russell Beale as Sir Hugh Dalton KC
- Sarah Junillon as Phoebe

== Production ==
Greer Simpkin and David Jowsey are producers on the film for Bunya Productions, with Kevin Loader for Embankment Films. Suzie Miller, Susanna White, and Solome Williams are executive producers alongside Cynthia Erivo. The film is based on the Miller one-woman legal drama play of the same name which starred Jodie Comer.

Alongside Erivo, the cast includes Daniel Ings, Simon Russell Beale, Elizabeth Dulau, Noma Dumezweni, Toheeb Jimoh, Harry Treadaway, Sarah Junillon, and Elliot Levey. Principal photography took place in London in the autumn of 2025. Filming locations included The Old Bailey, Lincoln's Inn, and The Story Works.

== Release ==
In November 2025, a Screen Daily article profiling producer Free Range Films revealed that Sony Pictures had pre-emptively acquired distribution rights to Prima Facie in several territories, notably the United Kingdom and Australia.

Prima Facie had its world premiere at the Toronto International Film Festival on 13 September 2026. It was released in the United Kingdom on 13 November, and will be released in Australia on 14 January 2027.

== Reception ==
Metacritic review
breakdown (unweighted)

Positive
3 (19%)
Mixed
13 (81%)
Negative
0 (0%)

On the review aggregator website Rotten Tomatoes, 32% of 31 critics' reviews are positive, with an average rating of 5.3/10. Metacritic, which uses a weighted average, assigned the film a score of 50 out of 100, based on 16 critics, indicating "mixed or average" reviews.
