= Susanna White =

British television and film director (born 1960 or 1961)

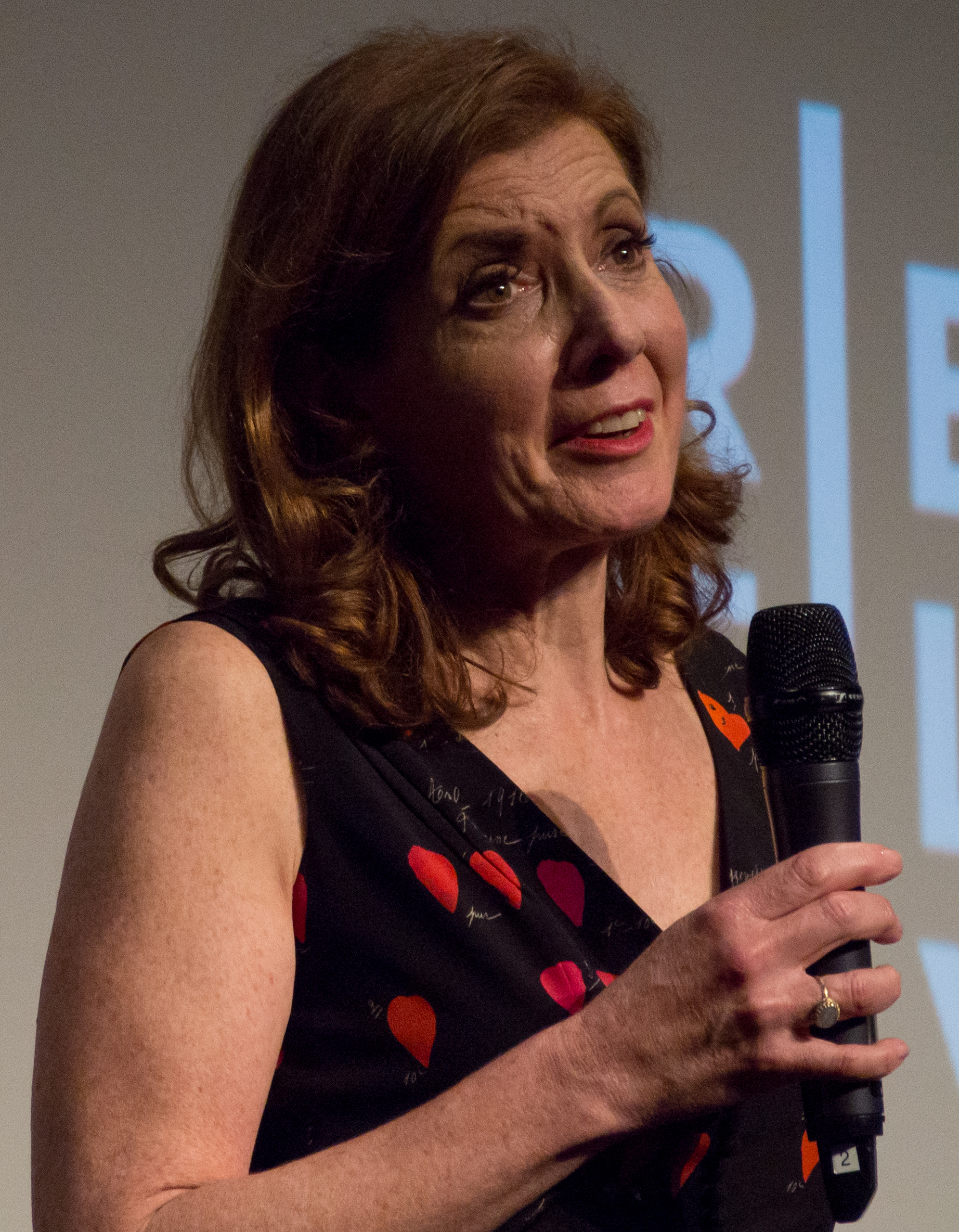
- Susanna White at the 2018 Tribeca Film Festival
- Born: 1960 or 1961 (age 65–66); England
- Occupations: TV and film director
- Years active: 1985–present
- Children: 2

Susanna White (born 1960 or 1961) is a British television and film director.

She spent twelve years making documentaries for BBC2, but is best known for directing the BBC miniseries Jane Eyre, HBO miniseries Generation Kill, and Disney+ series Andor. She has won multiple awards, including one BAFTA Television Award, and received numerous nominations, including nominations for two Primetime Emmy Awards and two BAFTA Awards.

== Early life and education ==
Susanna White was born in England in 1960 or 1961. She first became interested in films at eight years old and asked her parents to buy her a Super 8 film camera. One source reports that she said that the inspiration came from when she visited the set of the BBC children's TV show Crackerjack, but she wrote in 2010 that it was after her father took her to see Doctor Dolittle with Rex Harrison that she asked for the camera.

She studied English at Oxford University, and then won a Fulbright scholarship to study film at UCLA.

== Career ==
After graduation, White spent 12 years making documentaries for BBC2. In 1999, she failed to win a place on a BBC training scheme and was turned down for a BBC drama director trainee course. In 2001, she was supported by BBC2 controller Jane Root, who eased her into drama with a £200,000 budget drama for BBC2, Love Again, about Philip Larkin. She said in 2010 that it was seeing Jane Campion's 1993 film The Piano at a cinema on King's Road that inspired her to become a maker of feature films rather than documentaries.

White won a BAFTA award for best drama serial for her work on the 2005 version of Bleak House. She directed the BBC mini-series Jane Eyre, for which she was nominated for an Emmy award. She also directed four episodes of the HBO miniseries Generation Kill, and all five episodes of the 2012 series Parade's End.

In film, White has directed Nanny McPhee and the Big Bang and Our Kind of Traitor.

White directed three episodes of the Disney+ Star Wars series Andor, which were released in 2022.

She is directing the film version of Australian playwright Suzie Miller's award-winning play Prima Facie, in pre-production as of September 2024. The film stars Cynthia Erivo as Tessa, the only role in the stage version.

== Personal life ==
White and her husband, an Oxford academic and part-time dairy farmer, were living on a dairy farm in Sussex with their twin daughters in 2009.

== Filmography ==
=== Film ===
Year	Title	Notes
1997	Bicycle Thieves	Short
2010	Nanny McPhee and the Big Bang	
2016	Our Kind of Traitor	
2017	Woman Walks Ahead	
2026	Prima Facie	

=== Television ===
Year	Title	Notes
1985	Bleak House	Episode 7
1988	40 Minutes	Episode: "The Gypsies Are Coming"
1995–1996	Modern Times	2 episodes
2001	Holby City	3 episodes
2002	Attachments	4 episodes
2002–2003	Teachers	5 episodes
2003	Love Again	TV film
2004	Lie with Me	TV series
2005	Mr. Harvey Lights a Candle	TV film
2005	Bleak House	7 episodes
2006	Jane Eyre	4 episodes
2007	The Diary of a Nobody	TV film
2008	Generation Kill	4 episodes
2011	Boardwalk Empire	Episode: "A Dangerous Maid"
2012	Parade's End	5 episodes
2015	Masters of Sex	Episode: "Party of Four"
2016	Billions	Episode: "Where the F*** is Donnie?"
2018	Trust	2 episodes
2018–2019	The Deuce	2 episodes
2022	Andor	3 episodes
2023	The Buccaneers	2 episodes

== Awards and nominations ==
Year	Award	Category	Title	Result	Notes
2006	British Academy Television Awards	Best Drama Serial	Bleak House	Won	
2007	Primetime Emmy Awards	Outstanding Directing for a Limited or Anthology Series or Movie	Jane Eyre	Nominated	
2009	Primetime Emmy Awards	Outstanding Directing for a Limited or Anthology Series or Movie	Generation Kill	Nominated	
2010	British Academy Film Awards	Best Children's Feature Film	Nanny McPhee and the Big Bang	Nominated	
2013	British Academy Television Awards	Best Mini Series	Parade's End	Nominated	
