= A Complicated Woman =

Studio album by Self Esteem
- Released: 25 April 2025
- Length: 45:21
- Label: Polydor
- Producer: Johan Hugo

Self Esteem chronology
Prima Facie (2022)	A Complicated Woman (2025)

Singles from A Complicated Woman
- 1. "Focus Is Power" Released: 21 January 2025; 2. "69" Released: 14 February 2025; 3. "If Not Now, It's Soon" Released: 24 March 2025; 4. "The Deep Blue Okay" Released: 24 April 2025

A Complicated Woman is the third studio album by the English singer and songwriter Self Esteem. It was released on 25 April 2025 via Polydor. It follows her 2021 critically acclaimed album, Prioritise Pleasure.

== Critical reception ==
Professional ratings
Aggregate scores
Source	Rating
AnyDecentMusic?	8.0/10
Metacritic	72/100
Review scores
Source	Rating
Beats Per Minute	77%
Clash	8/10
DIY	5/5 stars
The Guardian	3/5 stars
The Line of Best Fit	7/10
MusicOMH	5/5 stars
Pitchfork	4.8/10
PopMatters	8/10
Record Collector	4/5 stars
Uncut	7/10

According to the review aggregator Metacritic, A Complicated Woman received "generally favorable reviews" based on a weighted average score of 72 out of 100 from 14 critic scores. AnyDecentMusic?, another aggregator, gave it an average rating of 8.0 out of 10 from a sample of 19 critical reviews. The Economist included the album in their list of the top ten albums for 2025.

== Track listing ==
A Complicated Woman track listing
No.	Title	Writer(s)	Length
1.	"I Do and I Don't Care"	Rebecca Lucy Taylor; Johan Hugo	4:48
2.	"Focus Is Power"	Taylor; Hugo; Pale Jay	3:06
3.	"Mother"	Taylor; Hugo	3:33
4.	"The Curse"	Taylor; Hugo; Seye Adelekan	4:09
5.	"Logic, Bitch!" (featuring Sue Tompkins)	Taylor; Hugo; Ruth Edmonson	4:09
6.	"Cheers to Me"	Taylor; Hugo; Edmonson	3:54
7.	"If Not Now, It's Soon"	Taylor; Hugo	2:35
8.	"In Plain Sight" (featuring Moonchild Sanelly)	Taylor; Hugo; Jay; Sanelisiwe Twisha	4:00
9.	"Lies" (featuring Nadine Shah)	Taylor; Hugo; Nadine Shah	2:55
10.	"69"	Taylor; Hugo; Tom Rasmussen	3:29
11.	"What Now"	Taylor	2:52
12.	"The Deep Blue Okay"	Taylor; Hugo	5:32
Total length:			45:21

== Personnel ==
Credits adapted from Tidal.

=== Musicians ===
- Rebecca Taylor – lead vocals (all tracks), choir arrangement (tracks 1–4, 6–8, 11–12), strings arrangement (1–2)
- Johan Hugo – drums (except 11), programming (1–7, 9–10, 12), string arrangement (1–2, 4, 6–8, 12), bass (except 1), keyboards (2–4, 6–12), synthesizer (2, 8, 10–11), percussion (3, 8–10), organ (4, 11–12), clarinet (5), horn (7, 12)
- Seraphina D'Arby – vocals (1–4, 6–8, 10–11), background vocals (5)
- Sophie Galpin – vocals (1–4, 6–8, 10–11); choir arrangement, organ (11)
- Tom Rasmussen – vocals (1–4, 6–8, 10–11), additional vocals (10)
- Damon Gould, Levi Heaton, Marged Sion, Travis Ross – vocals (1–4, 6–8, 10–11)
- Angel Silvera – vocals (1–4, 7–8, 10–11), choir arrangement (1–4, 7–8)
- Adenikè Zen, Cecilia Ventura, Desrine Ewart, Glenn Meadows, James Thompson, Janine Kelly, Jessica McKenzie, Kelli Blanchett, Maleik Loveridge, PJ Greaves, Petra Luke, Renée Lamb, Rosie "Sepha" Cheyette, Shaun Riley, Tehillah Daniel, Yasmin Green – vocals (1–4, 7–8, 10–11)
- Bryony James, Kirsten Jenson – cello (1–2, 4–5, 7–8)
- Richard Pryce – double bass (1–2, 4–5, 7–8)
- Clifton Harrison, Meghan Cassidy – viola (1–2, 4–5, 7–8)
- Charis Jenson, Hayley Pomfrett, Jenny Sacha, Kerenza Peacock, Michael Trainor, Patrick Kiernan, Sarah Sexton, Steve Morris, Zahra Benyounes – violin (1–2, 4–5, 7–8)
- Rosie Danvers – strings arrangement (1–2, 4, 6–8, 12)
- Seb Rochford – drums (1–2, 7, 12)
- Seye Adelekan – bass (2, 4, 6, 12), background vocals (4–5), guitar (4), choir arrangement (6, 12)
- Ruthlss – piano (2, 4, 6, 12)
- Pale Jay – background vocals (4–5), additional vocals (7–8, 10), guitar (8)
- Sue Tompkins – vocals (5)
- Rob Milton – piano, programming, synthesizer (6)
- Colin Elliot – strings arrangement (7–8), horn (7)
- Esau Mwamwaya – additional vocals (7)
- Stuart Price – bass, drums, programming (7)
- Moonchild Sanelly – spoken word (8)
- Nadine Shah – vocals (9)
- Seraphina Simone – additional vocals (10)
- Freddie Wordsworth – horn (12)
- Raven Bush – strings arrangement (12)

=== Technical ===
- Johan Hugo – production (all tracks), engineering (except 5)
- Rob Milton – production (6)
- Stuart Price – production (7)
- Lorna Blackwood – vocal production (1–2, 4)
- Ben Baptie – mixing (1–2, 4–5, 7–9, 11)
- Geoff Swan – mixing (3, 6, 10, 12)
- Erik Hanson – mixing assistance (1–2, 4–5, 7–8, 11)
- Matt Cahill – mixing assistance (3, 6, 9–10, 12)
- Isabel Gracefield, Tommy Bosustow – engineering (1–2, 4–8, 12)
- Gordon Davidson – engineering (1–2, 4, 7–8, 10–11)
- Louis Lion – vocal engineering (1–2, 4–7, 12)
- Colin Elliot – additional engineering (1–2)
- Gonzalo Barrera – additional engineering (11)
- Carmel Comiskey, Daniel Hayden, Freddie Light – engineering assistance (1–2, 4, 7–8, 10–11)
- Matt Colton – mastering

== Charts ==
Chart performance for A Complicated Woman
Chart (2025)	Peak position
Scottish Albums (OCC)	5
UK Albums (OCC)	5
