= The Endless Coloured Ways: The Songs of Nick Drake =

2023 compilation tribute album

Compilation album tribute album to Nick Drake by various artists
- Released: July 7, 2023
- Length: 94:14
- Language: English
- Label: Chrysalis

Singles from The Endless Coloured Ways – The Songs of Nick Drake
- 1. "'Cello Song" Released: March 1, 2023; 2. "From the Morning" Released: March 22, 2023; 3. "Saturday Sun" and "I Think They're Leaving Me Behind" Released: April 13, 2023; 4. "Day Is Done" and "One of These Things First" Released: June 14, 2023

The Endless Coloured Ways: The Songs of Nick Drake is a 2023 compilation album by various artists serving as a tribute to English folk musician Nick Drake. The album was released on 7 July 2023 by Chrysalis Records. The project was helmed by Chrysalis CEO Jeremy Lascelles and Nick Drake estate manager Cally Callomon.

== Release ==
The album was announced March 1 along with the release of the lead single, Fontaines D.C.'s rendition of "'Cello Song" from the 1969 album Five Leaves Left. Prior to the album, a series of limited edition 7" singles were released featuring a selection of the album's tracks. The series also included a never-before-released recording of Drake playing Bob Dylan's "Tomorrow Is a Long Time".

== Reception ==
Professional ratings
Review scores
Source	Rating
AllMusic	3.5/5 stars
The Daily Telegraph	5/5 stars
Hot Press	9/10
Under the Radar	7/10

Editors at AllMusic rated this album 3.5 out of 5 stars, with critic Fred Thomas writing that "it's wonderful to hear yet another generation of artists doing interesting things inspired by Drake's evergreen presence". Bill Pearis of BrooklynVegan highlighted this album as one of the best of the week in indie music and highlighted several "lovely recordings" among the songs. In The Daily Telegraph, James Hall gave this release 5 out of 5 stars, stating that "new angles abound" in interpreting Drake's songs and declaring this compilation "an essential manual on the art of songwriting". Writing for Hot Press, John Walshe scored this album 9 out of 10, summing up that it is "respectful without being overawed of its subject, this is a wonderful collection". In Under the Radar, Ian Rushbury scored this compilation a 7 out of 10, calling it "occasionally fascinating and occasionally frustrating" for its choice of performers and songs that he ultimately considers "a mixed bag". Graham Reid of The New Zealand Herald included this in his favourite albums of 2023.

== Track listing ==
All songs written by Nick Drake.

1. Fontaines D.C. – "Cello Song" – 5:04
2. Camille – "Hazey Jane II" – 4:07
3. Mike Lindsay featuring Guy Garvey – "Saturday Sun" – 5:15
4. Bombay Bicycle Club featuring The Staves – "Road" – 2:36
5. Let's Eat Grandma – "From the Morning" – 3:40
6. David Gray – "Place to Be" – 3:31
7. John Parish featuring Aldous Harding – "Three Hours" – 4:32
8. Stick in the Wheel – "Parasite" – 4:51
9. Ben Harper – "Time Has Told Me" – 3:59
10. Emeli Sandé – "One of These Things First" – 3:39
11. Karine Polwart featuring Kris Drever – "Northern Sky" – 4:12
12. Craig Armstrong featuring Self Esteem – "Black Eyed Dog" – 3:45
13. Nadia Reid – "Poor Boy" – 4:35
14. Christian Lee Hutson featuring Elanor Moss – "Which Will" – 4:04
15. Skullcrusher featuring Gia Margaret – "Harvest Breed" – 2:48
16. Katherine Priddy – "I Think They're Leaving Me Behind" – 4:32
17. Aurora – "Pink Moon" – 2:06
18. Joe Henry featuring Meshell Ndegeocello – "Time of No Reply" – 4:04
19. Famous Blue Cable featuring Feist – "River Man" – 3:58
20. Liz Phair – "Free Ride" – 2:47
21. Philip Selway – "Fly" – 5:05
22. John Grant – "Day Is Done" – 6:26
23. The Wandering Hearts – "Voices" – 4:27

== See also ==
- List of 2023 albums
