= Prima Facie (play) =

2019 one-woman play by Suzie Miller

- Broadway Promotional Poster
- Written by: Suzie Miller
- Genre: Drama

Premiere
- Date: 17 May 2019
- Place: Stables Theatre, Sydney
- Official website

Prima Facie is a dramatic one-woman play written by Australian playwright Suzie Miller. It premiered in 2019 at the Stables Theatre, Sydney, Australia, where it picked up major awards from the Australian Writers' Guild. The 2022 London production of the show was nominated for five Laurence Olivier Awards, with wins for Best New Play and Best Actress for Jodie Comer, who subsequently won a Tony Award for the same role on Broadway in New York.

Miller reworked the play into a novel in 2023, and a film adaptation starring Cynthia Erivo came out in 2026.

== Plot and themes ==
The play is about a barrister, Tessa, who specialises in defending men accused of sexual assault, and whose view of the legal system changes after she is sexually assaulted herself. Themes include how witnesses in sexual assault cases are required to provide crystal-clear evidence for a conviction to be secured.

Prima facie is a Latin expression meaning "at first sight", or "based on first impression", and the play originally had the working title On the Face of It.

== Productions ==
=== Australia (2019 and subsequent) ===
Prima Facie premiered in 2019, at the Stables Theatre, Sydney, Australia. The production, directed by Lee Lewis and starring Sheridan Harbridge, ran from 17 May to 22 June.

This production was reprised in 2021, presented by Griffin Theatre Company and the Seymour Centre; at the Melbourne Theatre Company in February/March 2023; by the State Theatre Company of South Australia in Adelaide in April/May 2023; and by the Black Swan State Theatre Company in Perth in 2024.

=== West End (2022) ===
The play made its West End premiere in 2022, at the Harold Pinter Theatre, with Jodie Comer starring as Tessa, directed by Justin Martin. It ran from 15 April-18 June. English singer-songwriter Self Esteem composed the soundtrack for the West End production, which she digitally released on 14 June 2022. In a review of the production, The Guardian said of the play's messages, "there is power in hearing them spoken on a West End stage, and Comer manages to infuse breath-taking emotional drama in every last word."

The West End production partnered with the Schools Consent Project, a charity that visits schools to teach about sexual consent. As part of this partnership, Prima Facie gave free tickets to school groups and raised money for the charity.

Starting 21 July 2022, a filmed performance of the play at the Harold Pinter Theatre was shown at cinemas around the world by NT Live.

The show won all three of the categories it was nominated in at the 2023 WhatsOnStage Awards: Best Play, Best Performer in a Play (for Comer) and Best Graphic Design. It received nominations in five categories of the 2023 Laurence Olivier Awards: Best New Play, Best Actress (for Comer), Best Director (for Justin Martin), Best Lighting Design (for Natasha Chivers), and Best Sound Design (for Ben and Max Ringham). Out of five nominations, the play received two awards: Best New Play and Best Actress.

=== Broadway (2023) ===
The West End production made its North American premiere on Broadway in spring 2023. The show began previews on April 11, 2023, at the Golden Theatre, and officially opened on April 23, 2023, scheduled to run for a strictly limited engagement. The show received mostly positive reviews from the critics. The show was originally scheduled to run until 10 June 2023, but it was extended. The show played its final performance on July 2, 2023.

Jodie Comer won the 2023 Tony Award for Best Actress in a Play.

=== UK and Ireland tour (2026) ===
It was announced that the production will return to the UK and Ireland for the Something Has To Change tour with Jodie Comer reprising the role of Tessa. It will begin at the Richmond Theatre (23-24 January) before touring to Gaiety Theatre, Dublin (27-31 January), Lyceum Theatre, Edinburgh (3-7 February), New Theatre, Cardiff (10-14 February), Grand Opera House, York (17-21 February), Theatre Royal, Bath (24-28 February), Marlowe Theatre, Canterbury (3-7 March), Birmingham Rep (10-14 March) before ending at Liverpool Playhouse (17-21 March).

=== Other notable productions ===
A New Zealand production by Plumb Theatre, starring Acushla-Tara Kupe as Tessa, premiered at the Herald Theatre, Aotea Centre, in Auckland in June/July 2023.

=== In other languages ===
A Turkish adaptation, translated by Nazlı Gözde Yolcu, directed by Hakan Atalay, and with Olcay Yusufoğlu as Tessa made its premiere at Fashion Scene (Moda Sahnesi) on 4 January 2022. The play was still being performed at Tiyatro Oyunu in Istanbul in March 2024.

A Spanish adaptation directed by Peruvian Juan Carlos Fisher and with Vicky Luengo as Tessa made its premiere at Teatros del Canal on 31 August 2023. It was scheduled to run until 17 September 2023.

A German adaptation starring Mercy Dorcas Otieno premiered in September 2023 at the Deutsches Theater, Berlin, and revived there in January/February 2024.

A German adaptation starring Anna Rieser was performed in Austria in October 2023.

An Icelandic adaption directed by Þóra Karítas Árnadóttir and with Ebba Katrín Finnsdóttir starring as Tessa made its premiere at the National Theatre of Iceland on 17 November 2023.

The Dutch adaptation by Internationaal Theater Amsterdam, starring Maria Kraakman as Tessa premiered in Haarlem on 30 November 2023.

A French version, directed by Géraldine Martineau, in which Elodie Navarre played Tessa, premiered at Théâtre Montparnasse from February to April 2024.

In Serbia the show premiered at Bitef Teater in Belgrade on 26 January 2024, translated by Biljana Popmijatov, directed by Anja Suša, and performed by Maša Dakić.

In Brazil, Débora Falabella plays the role of Tessa Ensler in a production directed by Yara de Novaes from May to June 2024 at the Adolpho Bloch Theatre in Rio de Janeiro, and in the Teatro Unip in Brasília in August.

In Portugal, an adaptation directed by Tiago Guedes and performed by Margarida Villa-Nova premiered in Lisbon on 2024 and Porto on 2025.

A Chinese version, directed by Ke Zhou, in which Zhilei Xin played Tessa, performed in Shanghai, Chengdu, Wuhan, Nanjing, Suzhou and Beijing from June to August, 2023 and Beijing, Hangzhou, Shanghai and Suzhou from October to November, 2024.

A Swedish adaptation starring Arina Katchinskaia premiered at Malmö Stadsteater on 19 December 2024.

In Hong Kong, a Cantonese version directed by Poon Chan Leung, starring Louisa So as Tessa, performed from December 2024 to January 2025.

A Mexican adaptation directed by Camilla Brett and with Regina Blandón as Tessa made its premiere at Teatro Milán in Mexico City on 28 February 2025.

A German adaptation starring Cordula Hanns was performed in Chemnitz in 2026.

A Norwegian adaptation starring Maria Kristine Hildonen was performed in National Teatret in Oslo from 25 April 2025 to 17 March 2026

A Bulgarian adaptation starring Elena Telbis was performed in Toplocentrala Sofia on 29 and 30 March 2024 and continued with national tour until present day.

In February 2026, a Nepali translation of the play was staged in Kathmandu by Katha Ghera at Kausi Theatre. Directed by Akanchha Karki, the production featured Pashupati Rai in a solo performance, presenting the protagonist as an immigrant lawyer named 'Prisa' while retaining the play’s original UK legal context.

== Notable casting ==
| Character | Sydney | West End | Broadway |
| Character | 2019 | 2022 | 2023 |
|---|---|---|---|
| Tessa Ensler | Sheridan Harbridge | Jodie Comer | Jodie Comer |

== Soundtrack ==
Prima Facie (Original Theatre Soundtrack)

Soundtrack album by Self Esteem
- Released: 14 June 2022
- Genre: Electronic
- Length: 54:13
- Producers: Rebecca Lucy Taylor; Taylor Skye

Self Esteem chronology
| Prioritise Pleasure (2021) | Prima Facie (Original Theatre Soundtrack) (2022) | A Complicated Woman (2025) |

Musician Self Esteem's involvement was first announced on 7 February 2022. The soundtrack album was released digitally on 14 June, with a red vinyl released on 2 December. Self Esteem described her connection with the material by saying the play "deals with similar issues" as her previous album Prioritise Pleasure, and that the play is, "at heart ... an examination of what it can be like to be a woman today: the insecurities she's faced, heartbreak, sexism, misogyny, being told to look and behave a certain way." She also noted hope that her involvement would invite people to the show who otherwise feel alienated from theatre.

The Evening Standard's Nick Curtis called the soundtrack "evocative" and "heartbeat-led", while The Guardian's Arifa Akbar wrote that it "conjure[s] the ambient electronic sounds of an Ibiza beach bar."

=== Track listing ===
All tracks are written by Rebecca Lucy Taylor.

Prima Facie (Original Theatre Soundtrack) track listing
| No. | Title | Length |
|---|---|---|
| 1. | "The Winner" | 3:27 |
| 2. | "To See From Here" | 3:42 |
| 3. | "Chambers" | 3:43 |
| 4. | "Chambers Continued (How Cliche)" | 1:35 |
| 5. | "The Process" | 3:17 |
| 6. | "Day In" | 3:04 |
| 7. | "Perfect 2 Me" | 3:06 |
| 8. | "Day Out" | 2:07 |
| 9. | "To See From Here (Reprise)" | 2:38 |
| 10. | "Day Through" | 2:00 |
| 11. | "Perfect 2 Me (Reprise)" | 2:15 |
| 12. | "Second Place (Cab Rank Rule)" | 4:16 |
| 13. | "Lean Back and Think of Justice" | 3:51 |
| 14. | "Cross Examination" | 1:48 |
| 15. | "I Have No Power Here" | 3:53 |
| 16. | "How Dare You" | 1:49 |
| 17. | "To See From Here (Reprise 2)" | 3:39 |
| 18. | "1 in 3 (I'm Fine)" | 4:03 |
| Total length: | | 54:13 |

=== Personnel ===
- Rebecca Lucy Taylor – songwriter, vocals (1–6, 8–18), producer, programmer
- Taylor Skye – producer, piano (2, 11, 17, 18), synthesiser (5, 18), songwriter (5), vocals (7)
- Cicely Balston – mastering
- Eduardo de la Paz – mixing
- Matthew Skillington – vocals (7)
- Sophie Galpin – guitar (7)

== Adaptations and sequels ==
The 2022 production of the play at the Harold Pinter Theatre, starring Jodie Comer's Olivier and Tony Award-winning performance and directed by Justin Martin, as live theatre, was filmed and shown in cinemas around the world as a National Theatre Live production.

In October 2023, a novelised version of the play written by Miller was published.

On 15 May 2023, it was announced that the play would be adapted as a feature film, with actress Cynthia Erivo set to play the role of Tessa and Susanna White directing. The screenplay has been written by Miller, and the film is being produced by Greer Simpkin, David Jowsey, and Jenny Cooney, of Bunya Productions along with Participant. Erivo and Jeff Skoll are executive producers. It was in pre-production as of September 2024. Principal photography concluded in November 2025.

A second play titled Inter Alia was produced in 2025 at the National Theatre, moving to the West End in 2026. Miller has indicated that this may be followed by a second follow-up play to make a loose trilogy of the three.

== Awards and nominations ==
=== 2018: script ===
The script of the play won the 2018 Griffin Award, which "recognises an outstanding play or performance text that displays an authentic, inventive and contemporary Australian voice".

=== 2019: Sydney production ===
The Griffin Theatre Company production won the 2020 AWGIE Award for Drama and the 2020 Major AWGIE Award from the Australian Writers' Guild.

=== 2022 West End production ===
| Year | Award | Category | Nominee | Result |
|---|---|---|---|---|
| 2023 | Laurence Olivier Awards | Best New Play | | Won |
| 2023 | Laurence Olivier Awards | Best Actress | Jodie Comer | Won |
| 2023 | Laurence Olivier Awards | Best Director | Justin Martin | Nominated |
| 2023 | Laurence Olivier Awards | Best Lighting Design | Natasha Chivers | Nominated |
| 2023 | Laurence Olivier Awards | Best Sound Design | Ben Ringham and Max Ringham | Nominated |

=== 2023 Broadway production ===
| Year | Award | Category | Nominee | Result |
|---|---|---|---|---|
| 2023 | Tony Awards | Best Actress in a Play | Jodie Comer | Won |
| 2023 | Tony Awards | Best Scenic Design of a Play | Miriam Buether | Nominated |
| 2023 | Tony Awards | Best Lighting Design of a Play | Natasha Chivers | Nominated |
| 2023 | Tony Awards | Best Sound Design of a Play | Ben & Max Ringham | Nominated |
| 2023 | Drama Desk Awards | Outstanding Play | | Nominated |
| 2023 | Drama Desk Awards | Outstanding Solo Performance | Jodie Comer | Won |
| 2023 | Drama Desk Awards | Outstanding Lighting Design of a Play | Natasha Chivers and Willie Williams | Won |
| 2023 | Drama League Awards | Distinguished Performance | Jodie Comer | Nominated |
| 2023 | Drama League Awards | Outstanding Production of a Play | | Nominated |
| 2023 | Outer Critics Circle Awards | Outstanding Solo Performance | Jodie Comer | Won |
| 2023 | Theatre World Award | | Jodie Comer | Honoree |
