= List of Happy Valley characters =

Happy Valley is a British (BBC) crime drama television series that is set and filmed in the Calder Valley. The series stars Sarah Lancashire and Siobhan Finneran, and features a main and recurring cast.

== Overview ==
| Character | Portrayed by | Series | | |
| Character | Portrayed by | 1 (2014) | 2 (2016) | 3 (2023) |
|---|---|---|---|---|
| Sgt. Catherine Cawood | Sarah Lancashire | Main | Main | Main |
| Kevin Weatherill | Steve Pemberton | Main | | |
| Clare Cartwright | Siobhan Finneran | Main | Main | Main |
| Nevison Gallagher | George Costigan | Main | Main | Main |
| Ashley Cowgill | Joe Armstrong | Main | | |
| Tommy Lee Royce | James Norton | Main | Main | Main |
| Lewis Whippey | Adam Long | Main | | |
| Ann Gallagher | Charlie Murphy | Main | Main | Main |
| Daniel Cawood | Karl Davies | Recurring | Main | Main |
| Insp. Mike Taylor | Rick Warden | Recurring | Main | Main |
| Vicky Fleming | Amelia Bullmore | | Main | |
| DS John Wadsworth | Kevin Doyle | | Main | |
| Frances Drummond | Shirley Henderson | | Main | |
| Daryl Garrs | Robert Emms | | Main | |
| DSU Andy Shepherd | Vincent Franklin | | Main | Main |
| Amanda Wadsworth | Julie Hesmondhalgh | | Main | |
| DI Jodie Shackleton | Katherine Kelly | | Main | |
| Sean Balmforth | Matthew Lewis | | Main | |
| Alison Garrs | Susan Lynch | | Main | Main |
| Neil Ackroyd | Con O'Neill | | Main | Main |
| Ryan Cawood | Rhys Connah | Recurring | Recurring | Main |
| Richard Cawood | Derek Riddell | Recurring | | Main |
| Faisal Bhatti | Amit Shah | | | Main |
| Rob Hepworth | Mark Stanley | | | Main |
| Joanna Hepworth | Mollie Winnard | | | Main |

== Main cast and characters ==
- Sarah Lancashire as Catherine Cawood; a Halifax Police Sergeant.
- Siobhan Finneran as Clare Cartwright; Catherine's sister, who is a recovering heroin and alcohol addict.
- James Norton as Tommy Lee Royce; a drug-offender and the father of Catherine's grandson, Ryan.
- Charlie Murphy as Ann Gallagher; a kidnap victim who later becomes a Police Community Support Officer.
- George Costigan as Nevison Gallagher; a successful businessman and Ann's father.
- Karl Davies as Daniel Cawood (Series 2-3; recurring Series 1); Catherine's son, and later Ann's partner.
- Rick Warden as Inspector Mike Taylor (Series 2-3; recurring Series 1); Catherine's supervisor.
- Vincent Franklin (Series 2-3) as Detective Superintendent Andy Shepherd; the Head of the Murder Squad for Halifax Police.
- Con O'Neill as Neil Ackroyd (Series 2-3); an old friend of Clare, and later her partner.
- Susan Lynch as Alison Garrs (Series 2-3); Daryl's mother.
- Rhys Connah as Ryan Cawood (Series 3; recurring Series 1-2); Tommy's son and Catherine's grandson.
- Derek Riddell as Richard Cawood (Series 3; recurring Series 1); Catherine's ex-husband.

=== Series 1 ===
- Steve Pemberton as Kevin Weatherill; Nevison Gallagher's accountant.
- Joe Armstrong as Ashley Cowgill; a drug-dealing property developer.
- Adam Long as Lewis Whippey; an employee of Ashley.

=== Series 2 ===
- Shirley Henderson as Frances Drummond; Ryan's teaching assistant, and an infatuated admirer of Tommy.
- Kevin Doyle as John Wadsworth; a Detective Sergeant (DS) with a troubled home-life.
- Katherine Kelly as Jodie Shackleton; a Police Detective Inspector (DI) assigned to Halifax Major Incident Team.
- Robert Emms as Daryl Garrs; a bullied and disturbed young farmer.
- Matthew Lewis as Sean Balmforth; a murder suspect.
- Julie Hesmondhalgh as Amanda Wadsworth; John's newly estranged wife.
- Amelia Bullmore as Vicky Fleming; John's mistress

=== Series 3 ===
- Mollie Winnard as Joanna Hepworth, who is addicted to prescription medication and being abused by her husband.
- Mark Stanley as Rob Hepworth, as Ryan's PE teacher, who is abusing his wife Joanna.
- Amit Shah as Faisal Bhatti, local pharmacist who is supplying Joanna with drugs in exchange for sex.
- Emily Barnett as Becky Cawood, Catherine’s Daughter and Ryan’s Mother.

== Recurring cast and characters ==
- Shane Zaza as Shafiq Shah: a Police Constable (Series 1 & 2) Police Sergeant (Series 3).
- Ishia Bennison as Joyce: a civilian police employee.
- Jill Baker as Helen Gallagher: Nevison's wife.
- Ramon Tikaram as Praveen Badal: the Yorkshire Police District Commander.
- Olwen May as Mrs Beresford: Headmistress at Ryan’s School.

=== Series 1 ===
- Sophie Rundle as Kirsten McAskill: a Police Constable.
- Julia Ford as Jenny Weatherill: Kevin's wife.
- Adam Nagaitis as Brett McKendrick: a friend of Lewis'.
- Kelly Harrison as Ros Cawood: Richard's new wife.
- Hannah John-Kamen as Justine: Nevison's Personal Assistant.
- Mina Anwar as Mrs Mukherjee: Ryan's teacher.
- Amer Nazir as Twiggy: a Police Constable.
- Rachel Leskovac as Julie: Ashley's wife.
- Alan McKenna as Phil Crabtree: a Detective Inspector (DI) with the National Crime Agency.
- Caroline O'Neill as Lynn Dewhurst, Tommy Lee Royce's mother. She becomes the subject of a murder investigation in Series 2.
- Amelia Young as Lucy Cawood: Daniel's wife and Catherine's daughter-in-law.

=== Series 2 ===
- Madison Brown as Amber Wadsworth: John and Amanda's daughter.
- Felix Johnson as Jack Wadsworth: John and Amanda's son.
- Mete Dursun as Gorkem Tekeli: a Police Constable.
- Chris Michael-Hall as 'Sledge': a Police Constable.
- Angela Pleasence as Winnie Babic: an elderly neighbour of Catherine.
- Ivana Basic as Ilinka Blasevic: a Croatian trafficking victim.
- Hebe Beardsall as Leonie: a prostitute.
- Keeley Forsyth as Annette: a prostitute.
- Steve Edge as Graham Tattersall: Amanda's lover.

=== Series 3 ===
- Jason Merrells as DC Stead
- Joe Simpson as DC Carey
- Oliver Huntingdon as Ivan: a drug-runner for Darius.
- Jack Bandeira as Matja: a drug-runner for Darius.
- Joseph Palmer as Ezra Brook
- Saba Nikoufekr as Nazeem: Faizal’s pharmacy colleague.
- Anthony Flanagan as Viktor: Darius’s henchman.
- Alec Secareanu as Darius Knezevic: a prominent local gangster and aspiring politician.
- Judy Holt as Jane Hepworth: Rob’s mother.
