= Suzie Miller =

Australian playwright, librettist, and screenwriter

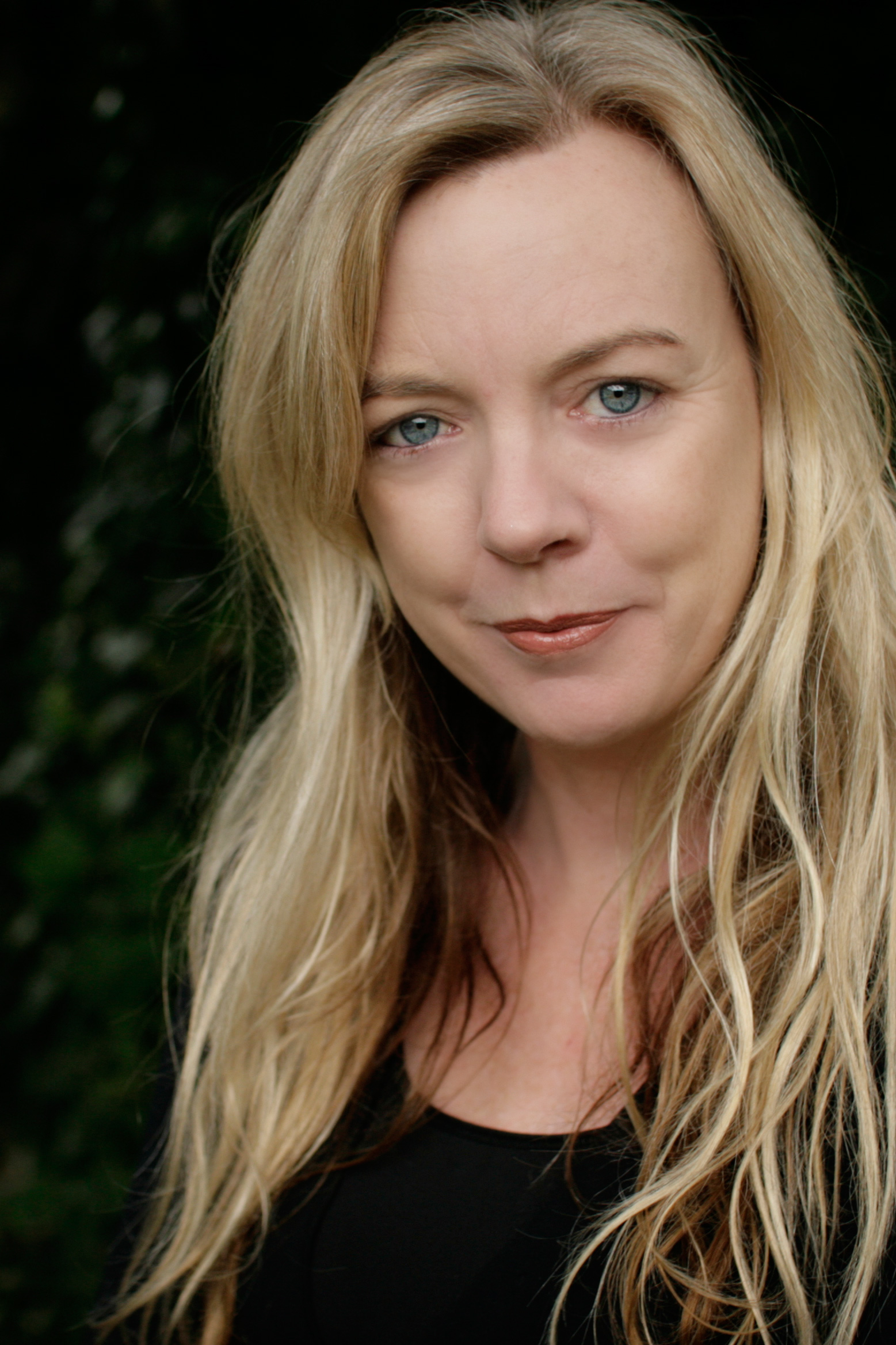
- Suzie Miller
- Born: 1963 or 1964 (age 62–63); Melbourne, Australia
- Education: Monash University (BSc); University of New South Wales (LLB); National Institute of Dramatic Art (MA); Queensland University of Technology (PhD)
- Spouse: Robert Beech-Jones
- Children: 2
- Writing career
- Notable work: Prima Facie

Susan "Suzie" Miller (born 1963 or 1964) is an Australian playwright, librettist, screenwriter, and lawyer. She has written over 40 plays, first coming to notice in 2008 for Reasonable Doubt, which premiered at the Edinburgh Festival Fringe. Her best-known play is Prima Facie, which was staged in a West End theatre in London starring Jodie Comer in April 2022, directed by fellow Australian Justin Martin. The production won two Olivier Awards, three years after a highly successful run in Sydney in 2019. It was also broadcast live to cinemas around the UK through NT Live, and later around the world. Her new play, Inter Alia, also directed by Martin, starring Rosamund Pike, opened in the National Theatre's Lyttleton Theatre on 10 July 2025. It is also set to be broadcast to cinemas through NT Live.

== Early life and education ==
Susan Miller was born in Melbourne, Australia, in 1963 or 1964. She was very close to her mother, Elaine who died in May 2019. Her family was a large, working-class Catholic family, and she grew up in St Kilda, a suburb which housed many immigrants. She attended the local Catholic school, where many of the children were Italian, Greek, Mauritian, and Indian. One of her grandmothers was an actress in musical theatre and piano player in silent films.

The family moved to Arnhem Land in the Northern Territory for some time when her father worked there, as an engineer in an aluminium mine. Her mother was visually impaired, but very community-minded, becoming mayor of St Kilda. She played chess with her father, who was keen on mathematics and science, and also wrote plays as a child.

The first in her family to go to university, Miller studied immunology and microbiology at Monash University in Melbourne, but rejected the opportunity to undertake a PhD in science. After a gap year in London, which she spent in a large run-down share house with filmmakers and some of Boy George's backing dancers as flatmates, she decided to do a law degree at the University of New South Wales in Sydney, starting in 1987, and did not return to Melbourne after that.

In 1995, while working as a lawyer, Miller studied at UNSW for a master's degree in theatre and film. After having to take a long break from both to recover after being struck down by viral encephalitis, she returned to work and completed her master's. In 2000 she undertook the now-defunct Playwrights Studio program at the National Institute of Dramatic Art (NIDA), working part-time as a lawyer as well as writing plays.

At some point later, she lived in Beechmont, Queensland for around 18 months while undertaking a PhD at Queensland University of Technology, completed in June 2020. Her thesis was entitled "The mathematics of longing: Exploring the interface between science and theatre by translating mathematical theorems into a play script", for which she created the play The Mathematics of Longing.

== Career ==
=== Early career ===
Miller first worked for top corporate law firm Freehills (now Herbert Smith Freehills), at the same time joining the Actors Centre. After 18 months at Freehills, finding it boring, she went to work for the Aboriginal Legal Service in Redfern. She was inspired to work as a human rights lawyer partly because of her childhood experiences in the Northern Territory and in the Melbourne suburb of St Kilda. After that she worked for the Public Interest Advocacy Centre (and studied for her MA at UNSW), having to take a long break to recover from serious illness in 1995.

In July 1997 she performed in Open 97 at The Performance Space in Redfern.

After getting married and while on maternity leave, Miller worked part-time at Shopfront Youth Legal Centre, a community legal centre funded by Freehills. Here she had to deal with a lot of crises and emergencies, as well as many sexual assault cases. She drew on these experiences when writing Cross Sections. During this time (2000) she was also studying at NIDA,

Miller's first play, Cross Sections, was based on contemporary stories from the experience of working as a lawyer for homeless youth in Sydney's red-light district (Kings Cross). It premiered at the Old Fitz Theatre in 2004 before transferring to Sydney Opera House. A radio version of the play directed by Chris Mead was broadcast by ABC Radio National on 9 December 2012,

An early work, Reasonable Doubt, premiered at the 2008 Edinburgh Festival Fringe at the Assembly Rooms (Edinburgh) directed by Guy Masterson, starring Peter Phelps and Emma Jackson. and New York Fringe Festival at Cherry Lane Theatre, also in 2008, directed by Lee Lewis, where it won the New York Fringe Overall Excellence Award for Outstanding Playwriting. Miller had sent the play to many theatres in Australia at the same time, but none had chosen to mount a production of it. The play features two characters who have just served on a jury and are now meeting for a date night. It runs for around 60 to 75 minutes, and was described by one reviewer as "quite a rollercoaster ride". It has been staged several times since then, including at the Bakehouse Theatre in Adelaide in 2018 and at the Holden Street Theatres in 2022.

She has said that in general the UK and Europe are far more supportive of writers than Australia (although in some London theatre circles they see Australians as "racist and misogynistic" and "don't think Australia has a real arts culture"). Her 2008 play Reasonable Doubt was turned down by the Belvoir in Sydney but went on to be a hit at the Edinburgh Fringe and in New York.

=== Full-time playwright ===
After spending years writing plays part-time while continuing to work as a lawyer, in 2009 she was offered a job as a magistrate and almost simultaneously offered a one-year residency at the Royal National Theatre in London. She decided to become a full-time playwright at this point. Her children were both in primary school at the time, and her husband was then a QC and not keen to make the move, but they rented out their Sydney house and moved to London in 2010. He continued to fly back and forth for work. After the family's return to Sydney, Miller flew to London every few months to work on her plays.

She became more widely known with Prima Facie, a legal term meaning "at first sight", or "based on first impression". The play first had an alternative title of On the Face of It.

Prima Facie is a one-woman play first staged by Griffin Theatre Company in Sydney in 2019, with Sheridan Harbridge taking the stage in a production directed by Lee Lewis. The COVID-19 pandemic shut down live performances for most of the following two years, but when theatres reopened, the play toured nationally. The play, which deals with how poorly women victims of sexual assault were treated in court, was a hit with audiences, women in the legal profession, media, and British producer James Bierman showed interest. A production of the play by Empire Street Productions, directed by Justin Martin and starring Jodie Comer was staged at the Harold Pinter Theatre in London's West End in 2022, followed by a run on Broadway. Another production was staged in 2023 by the State Theatre Company South Australia in April/May 2023, starring Caroline Craig. The 2022 production of the play at the Harold Pinter Theatre was filmed as a NT Live production and shown in cinemas around the world. It is also being adapted as a feature film, with actress Cynthia Erivo set to play the role of Tessa, to be directed by Susanna White.

Many of Miller's plays are centred around social justice. By April 2022, she had written 40 plays. Prima Facie has been translated into 25 languages, and performed around the world in many languages.

In November 2022, her play about American Supreme Court justice Ruth Bader Ginsburg, RBG: Of Many, One Wharf 1 Theatre by the Sydney Theatre Company, starring Heather Mitchell. The play is being reworked for a New York production.

Miller reworked Prima Facie into a novel, which was published in 2023.

In July 2023, Jailbaby, "Prima Facie's spiritual successor" premiered at Griffin's Stables Theatre. Although Guardian reviewer Cassie Tongue gave it a middling review, the season sold out and the play returned in January 2024. The play's theme is the over-representation of Indigenous Australians in prison.

Her play Inter Alia, commissioned by the National Theatre in 2023, starred Rosamund Pike in the lead role as a Crown Court judge. Directed by Prima Facie director Justin Martin, it opened at The National Theatre 10 July 2025,, with global cinema release as part of NT Live. The play transferred to Wyndham's Theatre in London's West End in 2026. The title Inter Alia refers to the Latin legal phrase 'inter alia', meaning "among other things". Inter Alia is described as a kind of "double soliloquy", in which judge Jessica Parks delivers both her public and private thoughts. Its topic is again about women and consent, with parallels to the 2025 Netflix hit series Adolescence.

Miller has also been working on the film of Prima Facie, shot in London, and two television series, including an adaptation of Heather Rose's novel Bruny. Other film projects include Dust, like Prima Facie, being produced by Bunya Productions; Life's Too Short (Hoodlum); and Creatures of Mayhem (Matchbox Pictures).

In July 2025, Creative Australia announced funding from the new Creative Futures Fund for the production of Miller's new play Strong Is the New Pretty, to be delivered by Brisbane Festival in partnership with Sydney Theatre Company and Trish Wadley Productions, directed by Lee Lewis.

== Other activities ==
Miller is a member of PEN International, a human rights organisation representing writers in countries where they are punished for speaking out. In 2010, she was on the board of State of Play as well as PlayWriting Australia, and was a member of the artistic advisory boards of both Theatre Royal Sydney theatre company and Inscription. She is or has been a member of the theatre committee of the Australian Writers' Guild and on the boards of various theatre companies.

In 2023, with her offspring in their early twenties, Miller was living among three cities: Sydney, London, and New York, but liked to get to the family apartment at Burleigh Heads, on the Gold Coast of Queensland, and Brisbane, when possible. In October 2023, she appeared at the Calile Hotel in Fortitude Valley, Brisbane, as part of a series of curated events and collaborations called the Calile Culture program.

In early 2024, Miller attended the WOW Festival in Greece, appeared at two events at the Sydney Writers' Festival in May 2024, and presented at the Brisbane Writers Festival.

As of 2024 she was working with the Justice Reform Initiative, run by former Labor politician Robert Tickner, giving lectures to judges, barristers, and anyone interested in law reform.

As of 2026 Miller funds an award for a mid-career playwright at the Griffin Theatre in Sydney. She remains based in London, where theatres, especially the National Theatre, are well funded and support her work.

== Awards and recognition ==
=== Playwriting awards ===
Miller received the 2005 Theatrelab Award, to develop the play SOLD with Cicely Berry of the Royal Shakespeare Company.

All the Blood and All the Water won the Inscription/Theatrelab Script Development Award and was shortlisted for the 2006 Rodney Seaborn Award. It was staged at the Riverside Theatres Parramatta and Casula Powerhouse in Sydney in 2008. As part of Inscription awards in 2006 and 2009, Miller was mentored by US playwright Edward Albee.

In 2008, she received the 2008 Kit Denton Fellowship for writing with courage.

In 2008 Miller's play Reasonable Doubt won one of four awards for Overall Excellence Award for Outstanding Playwriting at the New York Fringe Festival.

She was shortlisted for the Griffin Award in 2009 and Transparency was nominated for the 2010 Australian Writers' Guild Award in the Theatre: Stage category.

Miller's radio adaptation of Cross Sections won the AWGIE Award for Radio Adaptation in 2013.

Dust (2014) won the Western Australian Premier's Book Award for Script in 2016.

The Griffin Theatre Company production of Prima Facie won the 2020 AWGIE Award for Drama and the 2020 Major AWGIE Award from the Australian Writers' Guild. For the 2022 production at the Harold Pinter Theatre in London, Miller won the 2023 Laurence Olivier Award for Best New Play and Jodie Comer won the Olivier Award for Best Actress for her performance. At the 2020 AWGIE Awards awarded by the Australian Writers' Guild, Prima Facie won the AWGIE Award for Stage, Major AWGIE Award (across all categories of theatre, film, and television) as well as the David Williamson Prize for Excellence in Writing for Australian Theatre.

=== Residencies and fellowships ===
Miller had two residencies at the National Theatre in London, in 2011 and 2009, and at Griffin Theatre in Sydney in 2012. She was attached to Ex Machina in Quebec, Canada, with Robert Lepage in 2012.

In 2014, she was artist in residence at the National Theatre of Scotland, and in 2015 and 2016 with La Boite in Brisbane.

In 2018, she was appointed Drama Creative Fellow at the University of Queensland, giving students playwriting masterclasses and a guest lecture. In the same year, the script of Prima Facie won the Griffin Award.

== Ongoing impact ==
In 2023, a judge emailed Miller to let her know that they had redrafted their directions to the jury in sexual assault cases, and had included some of the words about witness recollections from Prima Facie. She has also received thousands of messages from sexual assault survivors, and lawyers who have seen the play.

In 2024, the Suzie Miller Award was established by the Griffin Theatre Company, for mid-career playwrights.

== Personal life ==
While working at the Aboriginal Legal Service, Miller met and later married Robert Beech-Jones, with whom she had two children. He was also a lawyer, later becoming a justice of the NSW Supreme Court, before being appointed as a justice to the High Court of Australia in 2023.

She is friends with writer Hilary Bell and Governor General of Australia Sam Mostyn, and godmother to 14 children.

As of 2022 Miller divided her time between London and Sydney.

== Selected works ==
Miller's works include (by premiere date):

- 2000: Births Deaths Marriages, written in the NIDA playwriting studio and performed as a playreading; selected for the Australian National Playwrights Conference in 2001.
- 2005: Cross Sections premiered at the Old Fitz Theatre before transferring to Sydney Opera House in 2005 (adapted for radio 2012)
- 2007? : SOLD, a comedy featuring real estate agents; for Cherry Lane Theatre in New York; performed at the Old Fitz in February 2007 directed by John Sheedy; later produced at Theatre503 in London (2011) directed by Natalie Ibu.
- 2008: All the Blood and All the Water, which tackled racism in Australia, premiered at the Lennox Theatre, Riverside Theatres Parramatta, May 8–30, 2008, after mentoring by Edward Albee, also directed by John Sheedy.
- 2008: The Emotional Anatomy of a Relationship Breakdown – Victorian Arts Centre, Melbourne
- 2008: Reasonable Doubt, premiered at the 2008 Edinburgh Festival Fringe at the Assembly Rooms (Edinburgh) directed by Guy Masterson, starring Peter Phelps and Emma Jackson.
- 2009: Confused Sea Conditions
- 2009: Transparency, which was developed with the Royal National Theatre, premiered with Ransom Theatre in Belfast and toured Northern Ireland. The Irish Times named it as "Best of 2009". In 2011 it was staged at the Seymour Centre and Riverside Theatres Parramatta.
- 2010: Extra curricular
- 2012: Driving Into Walls, by Barking Gecko Theatre Company in Perth, WA at the Studio Underground; in 2013 at Riverside Theatres and the Sydney Opera House
- 2013: In the Heart of Derby Park had its premiere season in Glasgow, Scotland, with Oran M'or Theatre Company in 2013.
- 2014: Dust, a production by the State Theatre Centre of Western Australia directed by Emily McLean, premiered at the Heath Ledger Theatre in Perth on 28 June 2014.
- 2014: Onefivezeroseven (Barking Gecko) at Studio Underground, Perth
- 2016: Caress/Ache premiered in 2016 at Griffin Theatre, Sydney
- 2017: Sunset Strip premiered in 2016 at Griffin Theatre then toured Australia with Critical Stages; 2024 production at New Theatre
- 2016: Snow White – The Opera, directed by Lindy Hume, had its premiere season at the Brisbane Festival in 2016.
- 2016: The Sacrifice Zone premiered in Toronto, Canada with Theatre Gargantua
- 2017: Velvet Evening Séance was developed by National Theatre of Scotland, Cove Park Artists Residency and Arts Scotland for a premiere season at the 2017 Edinburgh Festival Fringe and then Lemon Tree Theatre.
- 2017: Medea – A Feminist Retelling premiered at La Boite Theatre, Brisbane
- 2018: The Mathematics of Longing, La Boite, Brisbane
- 2019: Prima Facie premiered in 2019 at the Stables Theatre, Sydney, directed by Lee Lewis; it has been staged at the West End in London and played from April to July 2023 on Broadway; it has been translated into several languages. Miller reworked the play into a novel in 2023.
- 2022: Anna K, commissioned by and premiered at Melbourne's Malthouse Theatre in August 2022.
- 2022: RBG: Of Many, One, a one-woman play about Ruth Bader Ginsburg, premiered in 2022 at the Wharf 1 Theatre for the Sydney Theatre Company; in 2024 at Sydney Opera House and Playhouse Brisbane
- 2023: Jailbaby, commissioned by Griffin, premiered July 2023
- 2025: Inter Alia, premiered July 2025
