= Compliments Please =

Studio album by Self Esteem
- Released: 1 March 2019
- Genres: Pop, experimental pop
- Length: 52:42
- Label: Fiction Records

Self Esteem chronology
Compliments Please (2019)	Prioritise Pleasure (2021)

Compliments Please is the first album by the British musician Self Esteem, released on 1 March 2019.

== Writing and recording ==
Self Esteem, born Rebecca Lucy Taylor, said that she wrote most of the record whilst happily in a relationship, but that "Rollout", "In Time" and "I'm Shy" were written in the aftermath of the breakup of that relationship. Tracks for the album were recorded by Taylor in Margate from January to September 2018 with producer and co-writer Johan Hugo Karlberg. Taylor signed a record deal with Fiction Records in April 2018. During the period of recording she played live at Latitude, Tramlines and a sold out show at Omeara Theatre London, followed by an eight-show UK tour in autumn 2018.

== Music and lyrics ==
"(Feelings)", the spoken word beginning to the record, features an American woman speaking about the frustrations and compromises of being in a band, something which Taylor experienced while in Slow Club. The audio is Taylor's recording of Los Angeles Uber driver Kelly Jones, who was speaking about her own experience of being a singer in a band.

"Girl Crush" is critical of performative bisexuality and about Taylor's own experience of being approached by heterosexual women to experience homosexual relationships as a curiosity or a dare. It has been contrasted to Katy Perry's "I Kissed A Girl" which has been criticised for trivialising same-sex relationships.

Taylor has said that "Wresting" is about the early stages of many relationships in which both parties try not to seem too enthusiastic. "Rollout", with its refrain "What I might have achieved / If I wasn't trying to please you" has been described by Taylor as being the story of her 20s, trying to people-please in her music, her romantic relationships, her family and in wider society.

== Release and reception ==
The first single "Wrestling" was released in July 2018 followed by "Rollout" in September 2018, "The Best" in January 2019 and "Girl Crush" in February 2019. Compliments Please was released on 1 March 2019 on Fiction Records. Described as "brewing a concoction of high octane, R&B infused pop" it was well received critically, with an average rating of 80/100 according to Metacritic. A deluxe version was released in October 2019 with an additional track "Rooms".

Compliments Please was reissued on vinyl on 22 April 2023 for Record Store Day, causing it to enter the vinyl charts top 10.

As of April 2025, the album has sold 11,630 copies in the UK, according to the Official Charts Company.

== Track listing ==
All tracks are written by Rebecca Lucy Taylor with others noted.

No.	Title	Writer(s)	Length
1.	"Feelings"		0:33
2.	"The Best"	Johan Karlberg	3:50
3.	"Steady I Stand"	Karlberg; Oluwaseye Adelekan	3:51
4.	"Girl Crush"	Karlberg; Jacob Vetter; Sophie Galpin	4:04
5.	"Favourite Problem"	Karlberg; Vetter; Adelekan; Esau Mwamwaya	3:49
6.	"Hobbies"		2:10
7.	"I'm Shy"	Karlberg	3:15
8.	"Peach You Had to Pick"	Karlberg; Vetter	4:05
9.	"In Time"	Karlberg; Vetter	3:26
10.	"Monster"	Karlberg; Vetter	3:10
11.	"Actors"		2:47
12.	"Wrestling"	Karlberg; Adelekan	3:33
13.	"Truly Free"	Vetter	0:48
14.	"She Reigns"	Karlberg	4:37
15.	"Rollout"	Karlberg	3:16
16.	"On the Edge of Another One"		2:01
17.	"Rooms" (bonus track on deluxe edition)	Karlberg; Vetter; David Maclean	3:20
Total length:			52:42

Notes:

- "Feelings", "Hobbies", and "Truly Free" are stylised with parentheses.

== Personnel ==
Musicians

- Rebecca Lucy Taylor – vocals, guitar, percussion, drums, keys
- Johan Hugo Karlberg – programming, keys
- Jacob Vetter – keys, guitar, bass, percussion, backing vocals
- Oluwaseye Adelekan – guitar, bass, percussion, backing vocals
- Sophie Galpin – backing vocals, strings
- Kelli Blanchett – backing vocals
- Raven Bush – strings
- Resound Choir – Joseph Clarke, Mariah Hargrove, Jessica Fox
- Kelly Jones – spoken word on (Feelings)
- Alessandro Babalola – spoken word on (Hobbies)
- Genesis Lynea – spoken word on (Truly Free)

Production

- Johan Hugo Karlberg – production, recording, engineering
- Jacob Vetter – co-producer tracks 2–5, 8–11 and 14
- Mixing – James Dring
- Mastering – Jason Mitchell

Artwork

- Cover photo – Charlotte Patmore
- Painting (inside cover) – Francesca Hague, edited by Ian Hall
