= Prioritise Pleasure =

Studio album by Self Esteem
- Released: 22 October 2021
- Genre: Pop
- Length: 45:23
- Label: Fiction

Self Esteem chronology
Compliments Please (2019)	Prioritise Pleasure (2021)	Prima Facie (Original Theatre Soundtrack) (2022)

Prioritise Pleasure is the second studio album by the British musician Self Esteem, aka Rebecca Lucy Taylor, released on 22 October 2021. Most of the album was written before the COVID-19 pandemic but its recording was delayed by the subsequent lockdowns. The album was promoted by several singles, including the lead single, "I Do This All the Time". It received acclaim from critics, with several listing it as one of the best albums of 2021, and achieving a nomination for the 2022 Mercury Prize. The album charted at number 11 on the UK Albums Chart and as of April 2025 has sold 46,178 copies in the UK, according to the Official Charts Company.

In April 2021, Taylor released "I Do This All The Time", the first single from her second album as Self Esteem. In July, she released the title track and announced that the record, Prioritise Pleasure, would coincide with a UK tour in October of the same year. In August, Self Esteem released the third single, "How Can I Help You". In October, Self Esteem released "You Forever", the final single preceding the album which was released on 22 October 2021.

"I worked on this drama school...and it was with loads of female identifying people from 18 to 21. And we had all these conversations, and one of the people said that. They were like "me and my friends bark". And I was like, wow. And they're so much younger than me. I thought God, maybe it's different by now. But it's not."

— Rebecca Lucy Taylor, Mercury Prize interview August 2022

== Writing and recording ==
Taylor recorded one of the tracks, "How Can I Help You" in 2019, before the 2020 coronavirus pandemic lockdown. She has said that much of the rest of the album was written by early 2020 with rough demos waiting to be turned into full recordings, but due to the pandemic restrictions she "had to just sit and think about it longer than usual".

Of the lead single "I Do This All The Time", which is largely spoken word, Taylor has said "I went into this studio in Sheffield just to experiment, and I ended up building the backing track up, and just reading out my iPhone notes in a row". Before releasing the track, she said in an interview "I’m dabbling in spoken word on the next album. I’ve got a song called 'Sometimes I Think That’s The Problem' and it’s meant to be my version of “Sunscreen”, the Baz Luhrmann song...I’m gunning for that to be the opening track on the next album". Despite its subsequent success, she has said that the track nearly didn't make it on to the album.

Prioritise Pleasure was co-written, recorded and produced with Johan Hugo Karlberg, who Taylor also worked with on Compliments Please. She has said that they had to make the album on a small budget, but that their experience of working together on the first album made it easier to make a big sound with limited resources.

== Lyrics and music ==
"I'm Fine", with its line "Do you understand the pain you cause / When you see a body just for sport?" deals with the experience of sexual assault. At the end of the track is a voice recording of young women discussing strategies for staying safe on the streets, a recording made by Taylor at a National Youth Theatre drama school that she worked on. The women on the recording speak about barking at groups of men as a form of self-protection; at Self Esteem live shows audience members bark and howl in homage to this line.

The title track "Prioritise Pleasure" explores the theme of valuing self worth and self love in the face of social expectations, pressures and fears faced by women. In the face of prima facie criticisms of the phrase being self-centred, Taylor has emphasised that the track highlights the importance of not being driven by the need to please others, and "that not being indulgent and that not being selfish".

"I Do This All The Time" is a largely spoken-word track that contains a combination of critical self-talk ("Old habits die for a couple of weeks / and then I start doing them again"), pieces of advice ("Stop trying to have so many friends") and verbatim critical, sexist comments made to Taylor. One of the lines references sexist comments from a Slow Club tour manager who told her to put her dress on and stop complaining and said: "You’d be working in McDonald’s if you weren’t doing this". Of the abrupt ending used in this and other tracks on the album, she has described it as a "mid-paragraph idea" and that "it’s important to also acknowledge the fact that the happy-ever-after doesn’t exist, because it can just stop at any time. The abrupt end can encourage you to live in the moment more, while it’s actually happening, since life doesn’t fade out nicely."

"Moody" is reference to Taylor growing up being called "mardy" (a northern English term for "moody") and refusing the expectation to always be happy go lucky. "How Can I Help You" deals with the objectification of women, but was also inspired by the pain that Taylor felt of producing a record – Compliments Please – that she was intensely proud of yet gained limited commercial or critical success. "You Forever" reflects on the courage needed to do something alone, or to do something different, including in her launch of the Self Esteem project.

== Release and reception ==
Professional ratings
Aggregate scores
Source	Rating
AnyDecentMusic?	9.0/10
Metacritic	92/100
Review scores
Source	Rating
Clash	8/10
DIY	5/5 stars
Gigwise	10/10 stars
God Is in the TV	9/10
The Guardian	5/5 stars
The Independent	4/5 stars
The Line of Best Fit	10/10
musicOMH	5/5 stars
NME	4/5 stars
The Skinny	5/5 stars

Prioritise Pleasure received widespread acclaim from music critics. At Metacritic, which assigns a normalised rating out of 100 to reviews from mainstream critics, the album has an average score of 92, based on 12 critical reviews, indicating "universal acclaim".

In a five-star review, The Guardian reviewer Laura Snapes described the album as "remarkable" and "a rare big pop album after 18 months of comparatively diminutive offerings from headline female pop acts". El Hunt in NME called it "assured and unapologetic" and "charged with a dark, smirking wit that's impossible to turn away from". Jessie Atkinson of Gigwise concluded that Prioritise Pleasure "represents Rebecca Taylor reaching her well-deserved pinnacle, as a modern popstar with the whole package: voice, humour, choreography, honesty, looks and the uncanny ability to pen a banger".

=== Accolades ===
The Guardian, The Sunday Times, the i and Gigwise ranked Prioritise Pleasure as the best album of 2021. NME and The Independent ranked the album as the fourth best of 2021. The Guardian named "I Do This All the Time" as the best song of 2021.

A BBC News "poll of polls" that combined the results of 30 critics' end-of-year lists placed Prioritise Pleasure at number seven for 2021. A Metacritic collection of 182 year-end top ten lists by music publications placed the album at number 12 for the year.

The album was nominated for the 2022 Mercury Prize, the winner of which was Sometimes I Might Be Introvert by Little Simz.

=== Use in media ===
The song "Still Reigning" was used in the trailer for the 2024 Nora Fingscheidt film The Outrun.

== Track listing ==
Standard edition
No.	Title	Writer(s)	Producer(s)	Length
1.	"I'm Fine"	Rebecca Lucy Taylor; Jacob Vetter; Johan Karlberg	Johan Hugo; Vetter	3:02
2.	"Fucking Wizardry"	Taylor; Karlberg	Hugo	3:52
3.	"Hobbies 2"	Taylor; Karlberg; Mark Tieku; Oluwaseye Adelekan	Hugo; Tieks	3:47
4.	"Prioritise Pleasure"	Taylor; Karlberg; Vetter	Hugo	4:06
5.	"I Do This All the Time"	Taylor	Hugo; David Glover	4:53
6.	"Moody"	Taylor; Karlberg	Hugo	3:20
7.	"Still Reigning"	Taylor; Karlberg	Hugo	3:49
8.	"How Can I Help You"	Taylor; Karlberg; Vetter	Hugo; Vetter	2:22
9.	"It's Been a While"	Taylor; Karlberg	Hugo	3:04
10.	"The 345"	Taylor; Karlberg	Hugo	4:16
11.	"John Elton"	Taylor	Hugo	2:50
12.	"You Forever"	Taylor; Karlberg	Hugo	3:45
13.	"Just Kids"	Taylor; Karlberg; Vetter	Hugo	2:19

Deluxe edition bonus tracks
No.	Title	Writer(s)	Producer(s)	Length
1.	"Prioritise Pleasure" (string version)	Taylor; Karlberg; Vetter	Colin Eliot	4:14
2.	"You Forever" (string version)	Taylor; Karlberg	Eliot	3:26
3.	"The 345" (string version)	Taylor; Karlberg	Eliot	4:21
4.	"Hobbies 2" (string version)	Taylor; Karlberg; Tieku; Adelekan	Eliot	4:09
5.	"Still Reigning" (string version)	Taylor; Karlberg	Eliot	4:02

== Personnel ==
Musicians

- Rebecca Lucy Taylor – lead vocals, synths, string arrangements
- Oluwaseye Adelekan – bass, backing vocals
- Sophie Galpin – strings, piano
- Raven Bush, Francesca Ter-Berg – strings
- Jacob Vetter – keys
- Choir – Jacob Vetter, Marged Sion, Kelli Blanchett, Seraphina Simone, Sophie Galpin, Rebecca Lucy Taylor, Levi Heaton
- Johan Hugo Karlberg – programming
- Colin Elliot – additional string programming on "Still Reigning", "Prioritise Pleasure", "I Do This All The Time", "The 345"

Production

- Johan Hugo Karlberg – production, recording, engineering, mixing
- Mark Tieku – additional production on "Hobbies 2"
- David Glover – additional production on "I Do This All The Time"
- Cat Harrison – additional engineering on "John Elton"

Artwork

- Olivia Richardson – cover photo
- Felix Neill – artwork

== Charts ==
Chart performance for Prioritise Pleasure
Chart (2021)	Peak position
Scottish Albums (OCC)	9
UK Albums (OCC)	11
