= List of awards and nominations received by Florian Zeller =

Florian Zeller awards and nominations
- Zeller in 2026
Awards and nominations
Award	Wins	Nominations
Academy Awards	1	1
BAFTA Awards	1	3
Critics' Choice	0	1
Golden Globes	0	1
Olivier Awards	0	2
Tony Awards	0	1

Totals (Note: Certain award groups do not simply award one winner. They acknowledge several different recipients, have runners-up, and have third place. Since this is a specific recognition and is different from losing an award, runner-up mentions are considered wins in this award tally. For simplification and to avoid errors, each award in this list has been presumed to have had a prior nomination.)
- Wins: 61
- Nominations: 132

This article is a list of awards and nominations received by Florian Zeller.

Zeller is a French playwright and director known for his work on stage and screen. He has received various accolades including an Academy Award, a BAFTA Award, a César Award, a European Film Award, and a Moliere Award as well as nominations for a Critics' Choice Award, two Golden Lions, a Golden Globe Award, two Laurence Olivier Awards, and a Tony Award. He was awarded France's Legion of Honour in 2023.

For his work on stage, he has written a family trilogy, The Mother (2010), The Father (2012) and The Son (2018). He won the Moliere Award for Best Play for The Father when it premiered in France. When it debuted in London's West End stage in 2014 and the New York City's Broadway stage in 2016, he was nominated for the Laurence Olivier Award for Best New Play and the Tony Award for Best Play. His plays The Mother and The Son which debuted in France were also nominated for the Moliere Award for Best Play. His play, The Truth (2017) debuted in the West End earning a nomination for the Laurence Olivier Award for Best Entertainment or Comedy Play.

He adapted his play The Father as a director and screenwriter for film in 2020 starring Anthony Hopkins. The film received widespread acclaim and Zeller himself earned the Academy Award for Best Adapted Screenplay, the BAFTA Award for Best Adapted Screenplay, and the César Award for Best Foreign Film as well as nominations for the Directors Guild of America Award for Outstanding Directorial Achievement in First-Time Theatrical Feature Film, the Critics' Choice Movie Award for Best Adapted Screenplay, and the Golden Globe Award for Best Screenplay. He has since directed The Son (2022) and Bunker (2026), both of which competed for the Golden Lion at the 79th and 83rd Venice International Film Festival.

== Major associations ==
=== Academy Awards ===
Year	Category	Nominated work	Result	Ref.
2020	Best Adapted Screenplay	The Father	Won	

=== BAFTA Awards ===
Year	Category	Nominated work	Result	Ref.
British Academy Film Awards
2020	Outstanding British Film	The Father	Nominated	
2020	Best Adapted Screenplay	The Father	Won	

=== Critics Choice Awards ===
Year	Category	Nominated work	Result	Ref.
Critics' Choice Movie Award
2020	Best Adapted Screenplay	The Father	Nominated	

=== Golden Globe Awards ===
Year	Category	Nominated work	Result	Ref.
2020	Best Screenplay	The Father	Nominated	

=== Laurence Olivier Awards ===
Year	Category	Nominated work	Result	Ref.
2016	Best New Play	The Father	Nominated	
2017	Best Entertainment or Comedy Play	The Truth	Nominated	

=== Tony Awards ===
Year	Category	Nominated work	Result	Ref.
2016	Best Play	The Father	Nominated	

== Miscellaneous awards ==
=== Cinema ===
Country	Award	Work	Result	Category	Ref
USA	Directors Guild of America Awards	The Father	Nominated	Outstanding First-Time Director - Feature Film	
USA	Boston Society of Film Critics Awards	The Father	Won	Best First Film	
USA	Indiana Film Journalists Association Awards	The Father	Nominated	Best Film	
USA	Indiana Film Journalists Association Awards	The Father	Nominated	Best Screenplay	
USA	Florida Film Critics Circle Awards	The Father	Nominated	Best Director	
USA	Florida Film Critics Circle Awards	The Father	Nominated	Best First Film	
USA	Florida Film Critics Circle Awards	The Father	Nominated	Best Adapted Screenplay	
USA	Chicago Film Critics Association Awards	The Father	Nominated	Best Screenplay	
USA	Greater Western NY Film Critics Association	The Father	Nominated	Best Adapted Screenplay	
USA	Greater Western NY Film Critics Association	The Father	Nominated	Breakthrough Director	
USA	Hawaii Film Critics Society Awards	The Father	Nominated	Best Film	
USA	Hawaii Film Critics Society Awards	The Father	Nominated	Best First Film	
USA	Hawaii Film Critics Society Awards	The Father	Nominated	Best Director	
USA	Hawaii Film Critics Society Awards	The Father	Nominated	Best New Filmmaker	
USA	Hawaii Film Critics Society Awards	The Father	Nominated	Best Screenplay	
USA	Chicago Indie Critics Awards	The Father	Nominated	Best Independent Film	
USA	Chicago Indie Critics Awards	The Father	Nominated	Best Director	
USA	Chicago Indie Critics Awards	The Father	Nominated	Best Adapted Screenplay	
USA	San Diego Film Critics Society Awards	The Father	Won	Best Adapted Screenplay	
USA	San Diego Film Critics Society Awards	The Father	Nominated	Best Director	
USA	Houston Film Critics Society Awards	The Father	Nominated	Best Film	
USA	Satellite Awards	The Father	Nominated	Best Film	
USA	Satellite Awards	The Father	Nominated	Best Director	
USA	Satellite Awards	The Father	Won	Best Adapted Screenplay	
USA	Hollywood Critics Association Awards	The Father	Nominated	Best Film	
USA	Hollywood Critics Association Awards	The Father	Nominated	Best Screenplay	
USA	Nevada Film Critics Society Awards	The Father	Won	Best Adapted Screenplay	
USA	Austin Film Critics Association Awards	The Father	Nominated	Best Screenplay	
Europe	European Film Awards	The Father	Nominated	Best Film	
Europe	European Film Awards	The Father	Nominated	Best Director	
Europe	European Film Awards	The Father	Won	Best European Screenplay	
UK	BIFA	The Father	Won	Best Screenplay	
UK	BIFA	The Father	Nominated	Best Film in 2020	
UK	BIFA	The Father	Nominated	Best Director in 2020	
UK	London Critics Circle Film Awards	The Father	Nominated	Best British Film	
France	Cesar Awards	The Father	Won	Best International Film	
France	Lumière Awards	The Father	Nominated	Best International Film	
France	Paris Film Critics Awards	The Father	Won	Best First Film	
France	Cinéroman	The Father	Won	Best Film	
Spain	Premios CEC	The Father	Nominated	Best Foreign Film	
Spain	Goya Awards	The Father	Won	Best European Film	
Spain	Sant Jordi Awards	The Father	Won	Best International Film	
Spain	San Sebastian Audience Award	The Father	Won	Best Film	
Italy	Golden Lion	The Son	Nominated	Best Film	
Italy	Golden Lion	Bunker	Nominated	Best Film	
Norway	Amanda Awards	The Father	Nominated	Best International Film	
Germany	Funk Seen Film Festival Awards	The Father	Nominated	Audience Award	
Poland	Polish Film Awards	The Father	Won	Best European Film	
Sweden	Guldbagge Awards	The Father	Nominated	Best International Film	
Sweden	Swedish Film Critics Circle Awards	The Father	Won	Best Screenplay	
Denmark	Bodil Awards	The Father	Nominated	Best International Film	
Denmark	Danish Film Awards	The Father	Won	Best Screenplay	
Türkiye	Turkish Film Critics Association	The Father	Nominated	Best International Film	
Brazil	Grande Prêmio do Cinema Brasileiro	The Father	Nominated	Best International Film	
Australia	AACTA Awards	The Father	Nominated	Best Screenplay	
Australia	AACTA Awards	The Father	Nominated	Best Film	
China	Golden Rooster Awards	The Father	Won	Best International Film	
China	Golden Rooster Awards	The Son	Nominated	Best International Film	
China	Golden Panda Awards	The Son	Won	Best International Film	

=== Theatre ===
Country	Award	Work	Result	Category	Ref.
USA	Outer Critics Circle Awards	The Father	Nominated	Best Play in 2016	
USA	Outer Critics Circle Awards	The Height of the Storm	Won	Best Play in 2020	
USA	Drama League Awards	The Father	Nominated	Best Play in 2016	
USA	Los Angeles Drama Critics Circle Awards	The Father	Won	Best Play in 2020	
UK	Evening Standard Theatre Awards	The Father	Nominated	Best Play in 2016	
UK	Theatre Awards UK	The Father	Nominated	Best Play in 2016	
UK	Manchester Theatre Awards	The Father	Won	Best Play in 2018	
France	Moliere Awards	The Father	Won	Best Play in 2014	
France	Moliere Awards	The Mother	Nominated	Best Play in 2011	
France	Moliere Awards	The Son	Nominated	Best Play in 2018	
France	Prix du théâtre	For all his work	Won	Best Playwright	
France	Académie française Awards	If you were to die	Won	Best Play in 2006	
France	SACD Awards	All his work	Won	Best Playwright	
Japan	Kikuta Kazuo Awards	The Father	Won	Best Play in 2019	
Japan	Yomiuri Awards	The Father	Won	Best Play in 2020	
Hong Kong	Hong Kong Drama Awards	The Father	Won	Best Play in 2018	
Hong Kong	Hong Kong Drama Awards	The Truth	Nominated	BestPlay in 2018	
Canada	Jessie Richardson Awards	The Father	Won	Best Play in 2020	
Brazil	Aplauso Brazil Awards	The Father	Won	Best Play in 2017	
Israel	Academy Theatre Awards	The Father	Nominated	Best Play in 2016	
Germany	Friedrich-Luft Awards	The Father	Nominated	Best Play in 2017	
Ireland	Irish Times Theatre Awards	The Father	Nominated	Best Play in 2017	
Mexico	Cartelera Awards	The Father	Won	Best Play in 2024	
Mexico	Acpt Awards	The Father	Won	Best Play in 2024	
Colombia	Premios Bravo	The Father	Won	Best Play in 2026	
