= Embankment Films =

British film and television company

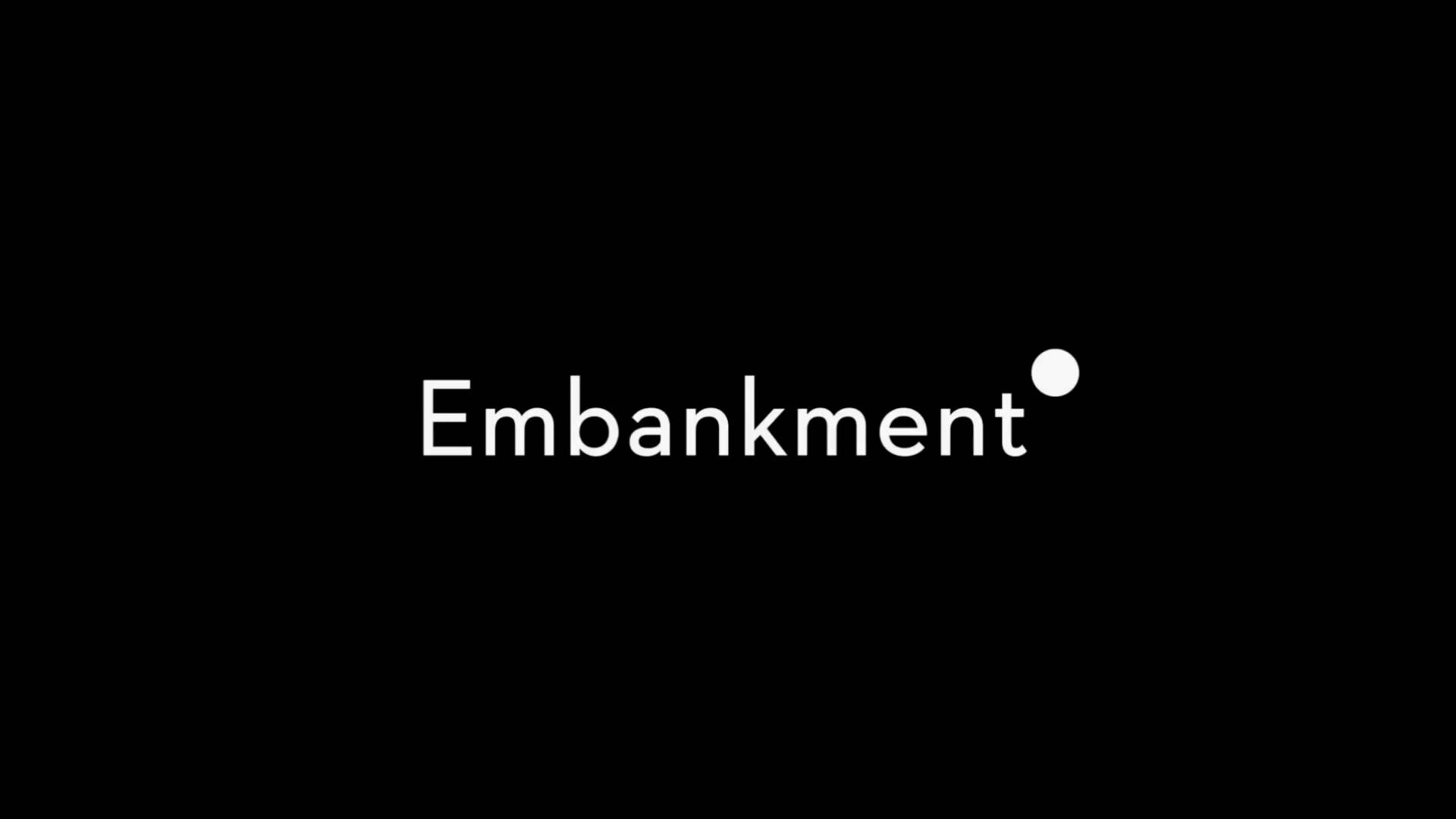
- Industry: Film and Television Sales and Finance
- Founded: 2012; 14 years ago
- Headquarters: London, England
- Key people: Tim Haslam (Co-Director); Hugo Grumbar (Co-Director)
- Website: www.embankmentfilms.com

Embankment Films is a British film and television sales and production company based in London, England.

== History ==
Founded in 2012 by Tim Haslam and Hugo Grumbar, Embankment procures pre-sales, tax-credit facilities, equity, gap financing and worldwide distribution for feature films and television. Haslam was formerly CEO at Hanway Films. Grumbar was formerly joint MD of the UK division of Icon Film Distribution.

Since the creation of the company, Embankment has raised finance for over 64 feature films including The Dressmaker, Boychoir, Le Week-End,, Churchill, Breathe, directed by Andy Serkis, Driven, Red Joan, directed by Trevor Nunn, Ride Like a Girl, directed by Rachel Griffiths, Untouchable directed by Ursula Macfarlane and produced by Simon Chinn, Can You Keep a Secret?, Summerland, directed by Jessica Swale, Military Wives, directed by Peter Cattaneo, and The Father, directed by Florian Zeller. The Father received six Academy Award nominations, and won two British Academy Film Awards. Embankment also represented and raised financing for Florian Zeller's second feature, The Son, that premiered at the Venice Film Festival 2022.

In 2023, Nick Taussig, Sophie Harmer and Henry Farrington joined Embankment Films to lead its unscripted division. Taussig and Harmer both joined from UK production outfit Salon Pictures, producer of the documentary McQueen which Embankment handled sales for. Since then, they have produced documentaries, including Dwarf Story, Garbo: Leave Me Alone and Sheffield DocFest audience award-winner, Strike: An Uncivil War.

== Film library ==
Year	Title	Director	Notes
2013	Diana	Oliver Hirschbiegel	
2013	Le Week-End	Roger Michell	
2014	Boychoir	François Girard	
2014	Robot Overlords	Jon Wright	
2015	Pressure	Ron Scalpello	
2015	Kidnapping Mr. Heineken	Daniel Alfredson	
2015	The Dressmaker	Jocelyn Moorhouse	
2016	Down Under	Abe Forsythe	
2016	The Guv'nor	Paul Van Carter	
2016	Brimstone	Martin Koolhoven	
2016	The Monster	Bryan Bertino	
2016	Inside	Miguel Ángel Vivas	
2017	Churchill	Jonathan Teplitzky	
2017	My Name Is Lenny	Ron Scalpello	
2017	Breath	Simon Baker	
2017	Submergence	Wim Wenders	
2017	The Wife	Björn Runge	
2017	Breathe	Andy Serkis	
2017	Please Stand By	Ben Lewin	
2018	Galveston	Mélanie Laurent	
2018	McQueen	Ian Bonhôte; Peter Ettedgui	
2018	Red Joan	Trevor Nunn	
2018	Driven	Nick Hamm	
2018	Malevolent	Olaf de Fleur Jóhannesson	
2019	Untouchable	Ursula Macfarlane	
2019	Can You Keep a Secret?	Elise Durán	
2019	Military Wives (film)	Peter Cattaneo	
2019	Ride Like a Girl	Rachel Griffiths	
2020	The Father	Florian Zeller	
2020	Summerland	Jessica Swale	
2021	The United Way	Mat Hodgson	
2021	Count Me In	Mark Lo	
2021	Dettori	Anthony Wonke	
2022	Elizabeth: A Portrait in Part(s)	Roger Michell	
2022	Purple Hearts	Elizabeth Allen Rosenbaum	
2022	Joyride	Emer Reynolds	
2022	The Son	Florian Zeller	
2022	Emily	Frances O'Connor	
2023	Golda	Guy Nattiv	
2023	The Unlikely Pilgrimage of Harold Fry	Hettie Macdonald	
2023	The Miracle Club	Thaddeus O'Sullivan	
2023	Joika	James Napier Robertson	
2023	Lies We Tell	Lisa Mulcahy	
2023	The Movie Teller	Lone Scherfig	
2024	An Ideal Wife	Sophie Hyde	
2024	Clybourne Park	Pam MacKinnon	
2024	Stasi F.C	Arne Birkenstock; Daniel Gordon	
2024	Strike: An Uncivil War	Daniel Gordon	
2024	Dwarf Story	Riccardo Servini	
2024	Garbo: Leave Me Alone	Lorna Tucker	
2024	Born Wild	Adam McCelland	
2026	Prima Facie	Susanna White	
TBA	Untitled Guy Nattiv film	Guy Nattiv	
