= Bunker (2026 film) =

2026 film by Florian Zeller

- Directed by: Florian Zeller
- Written by: Florian Zeller
- Produced by: Federica Sainte-Rose; Florian Zeller; Fernando Bovaira; Simón de Santiago; Alice Dawson
- Starring: Javier Bardem; Penélope Cruz; Stephen Graham; Patrick Schwarzenegger; Mark Gatiss; Eileen Atkins; Paul Dano
- Cinematography: Ben Smithard
- Edited by: Yorgos Lamprinos
- Music by: Volker Bertelmann
- Production companies: Blue Morning Pictures; MOD Producciones; Pathé; Mediawan; Entourage Pictures; France 2 Cinema
- Distributed by: Pathé (France); Elastica Films (Spain)
- Release dates: 8 September 2026 (Venice); 27 January 2027 (France); 12 February 2027 (Spain)
- Running time: 118 minutes
- Countries: France; Spain
- Languages: English; Spanish

Bunker is a 2026 psychological thriller film written and directed by Florian Zeller. It stars Javier Bardem, Penélope Cruz, Stephen Graham, Patrick Schwarzenegger, Mark Gatiss, Eileen Atkins, and Paul Dano.

The film had its world premiere in the main competition of the 83rd Venice International Film Festival on 8 September 2026, where it competed for the Golden Lion.

== Premise ==
An architect's marriage is tested after he accepts a project to build a bunker for a billionaire.

== Cast ==
- Javier Bardem as Miguel Moreno
- Penélope Cruz as Sofia
- Stephen Graham as Toby
- Patrick Schwarzenegger as Jeremy
- Mark Gatiss as Simon
- Eileen Atkins as Eileen
- Paul Dano as Andrew
- Sarah Hadland as Susan Laurie
- Chloe Conh as Lucia
- Leah Conh as Rosa

== Production ==
=== Development ===
The film was announced on 1 May 2025 and was presented at the Marché du Film later that month. Writer-director Florian Zeller stated that the film The Man Next Door, directed by Bunker executive producers Mariano Cohn and Andrés Duprat, was a source of inspiration when writing the film, which features some Spanish dialogue.

=== Casting ===
Zeller wrote the film specifically with actors Penélope Cruz and Javier Bardem, who are married in real life, in mind; they were announced as cast members on 1 May 2025. Stephen Graham was announced as a cast member later that month, on 16 May 2025. In November 2025, Patrick Schwarzenegger was announced as a cast member. In December 2025, by the time Bunker was in its second week of filming, Paul Dano was also reported to have joined the cast.

=== Filming ===
Principal photography began in December 2025. The film was shot primarily in Madrid, with a week of production also taking place in London. Filming was completed by 9 February 2026.

== Release ==
Javier Bardem and Penélope Cruz at the 83rd Venice International Film Festival

In June 2026, it was revealed Elastica would be handling the film's release in Spain, where the theatrical rollout is scheduled for 12 February 2027. In July 2026, Sony Pictures Classics, which also distributed Zeller's previous films The Father and The Son, acquired distribution rights to Bunker for North America and Southeast Asia as well as worldwide airlines excluding France. Sony plans to give the film an awards-qualifying run in late 2026, followed by a theatrical release in the United States in early 2027. It was also revealed that Pathé would distribute the film in France, Switzerland and West Africa. Pathé programmed a 27 January 2027 French release.

The film premiered on 8 September 2026 at the 83rd Venice International Film Festival, in competition for the Golden Lion. It was also announced for the schedules of the 2026 Toronto International Film Festival (for its North American premiere), the 22nd Zurich Film Festival, and the 70th BFI London Film Festival.

== Reception ==
=== Critical response ===
On the review aggregator website Rotten Tomatoes, 49% of 43 critics' reviews are positive, with an average rating of 5.3/10. Metacritic, which uses a weighted average, assigned the film a score of 52 out of 100, based on 18 critics, indicating "mixed or average" reviews.

David Rooney of The Hollywood Reporter summed up the film as "flawed but compelling", also describing the film as "uneven and schematic".

David Ehrlich of IndieWire gave the film a C rating, dismissing the paranoid drama as "airless and unsatisfying" but commending the sharpness of Dano's "unnerving one-scene performance" as cutting to the core of Silicon Valley nihilism.

Guy Lodge of Variety wrote that Bunker "remains riveting in all its obsessive-compulsive meticulousness – in large part because Bardem and Cruz, both so fragile and so solid, give it actual human dimension".

Peter Bradshaw of The Guardian rated the film 2 out of 5 stars, declaring it "shallow and unsatisfying".

Wendy Ide of ScreenDaily assessed that "both Bardem and Cruz are terrifically strong in their respective roles".

Ben Croll of TheWrap found the film's biggest drawback to be "its indecision, in its less-than-successful toggling between two modes [theatrical and satirical] it can never quite mesh".

Manu Yáñez of Fotogramas rated the film 3 out of 5 stars, singling out "the powerful, silent glances exchanged by the two lead characters" as the best thing about the film, while citing "its tendency to overemphasize its themes" as the worst thing about it.

In a 3-star rating, Luis Martínez of El Mundo pointed out that the leading duo is worlds apart from a script and direction that are "as clear as they are redundant".

Bilge Ebiri of Vulture found the film "a crushing disappointment", displaying "all the trappings of arty gravitas but none of the insight, artistry, or charm".

=== Accolades ===
Award	Date of ceremony	Category	Recipient(s)	Result	Ref.
Venice Film Festival	September 12, 2026	Golden Lion	Bunker	Nominated	
European Film Awards	16 January 2027	Best European Actress	Penélope Cruz	Pending	
European Film Awards	16 January 2027	Best European Composer	Volker Bertelmann	Pending	
