= The Mother (Zeller play) =

2010 play by Florian Zeller

- Original language: French
- Written by: Florian Zeller
- Genre: Coming-of-age, drama, isolation, maternal obsession, loss of identity, empty nest syndrome

Premiere
- Date: 24 September 2010
- Place: Théâtre de Paris, Paris
- Directed by: Marcial Di Fonzo Bo

The Mother (French: La Mère) is an 2010 play by Florian Zeller. It is the first of the Zeller family trilogy which consists of The Father (2012) and The Son (2018). It is a French drama revolving around a woman whose identity unravels as her children leave the nest and her husband distances himself leaving her to confront her maternal obsession and lack of identity and ultimately a psychological breakdown.

The play had its world debut at the Théâtre de Paris with direction by Marcial Di Fonzo Bo starring Catherine Hiegel in 2010. A revival was mounted Off-Broadway starring Isabelle Huppert at the Atlantic Theater Company in 2019.

== Premise ==
The play follows a lonely and isolated mother who is confronted with her feelings as her children leave the house and her husband distances himself from her.

== Cast ==
Role	Théâtre de Paris World Debut (2010)	Ustinov Studio England Debut (2015)	Atlantic Theater Company Off-Broadway Debut (2019)
Anne	Catherine Hiegel	Gina McKee	Isabelle Huppert
Pieree	Jean-Yves Chatelais	Richard Clothier	Chris Noth
Élodie	Clément Sibony / Éric Caravaca	Cara Horgan	Odessa Young
Nicholas	Olivia Bonamy / Sol Espeche	William Postlethwaite	Justice Smith

== Production ==
The play had its worldwide debut at the Théâtre de Paris on 24 September 2010. The production was directed by Marcial Di Fonzo Bo and starring Catherine Hiegel. The play debuted in England starring Gina McKee at the Ustinov Studio in 2015. A revival was premiered Off-Broadway at the Atlantic Theater Company from 20 February to 7 April 2019, with direction by Trip Cullman starring Isabelle Huppert, Odessa Young, Justice Smith, and Chris Noth.

== Reception ==
When the play premiered in England, it received mixed to positive reviews with Matt Trueman of Variety writing, "Despite a delicate performance from Gina McKee, the play hasn't the elegance or the emotional surge of The Father but it's arguably the more important piece nonetheless. While we can only deal with dementia, it suggests we can act to prevent depression." Michael Billington of The Guardian wrote in his four star review, "Zeller plays beautifully on the fears and anxieties of a woman who has invested everything in family relationships and for whom, in midlife, society provides no visible role. But while the play tantalises and intrigues, it never quite achieves the fluidity Zeller perfected in The Father".

The play premiered in the United States starring Isabelle Huppert Off-Broadway at the Atlantic Theater Company in 2019 to positive reviews. Ben Brantley of The New York Times praised Zeller writing, He has "claimed the mantle of Yasmina Reza ("Art", "God of Carnage"), as the French theater's most popular chronicler...of the bourgeoisie." He also praised Huppert declaring, "She is...a free-range actress. Allowed the room to roam, she'll take you scary places you didn't know existed. You may not want to follow, but when a performance is this committed, you really don't have a choice." Marilyn Stasio of Variety wrote that the 2019 production failed in comparison to Zeller's previous work in The Father, but praised the lead performance of Huppert writing, "In the end, this turns out to be an upsetting play rather than an engaging one, and if it weren't for Huppert's mesmerizing performance, it might send you out of the theater and screaming into the night."

== Awards and nominations ==
=== Original production ===
Year	Award	Category	Nominee	Result	Ref.
2011	Molière Award	Best Play	Florian Zeller	Nominated	
2011	Molière Award	Best Actress	Catherine Hiegel	Won	
