= Élodie Navarre =

French actress (born 1979)

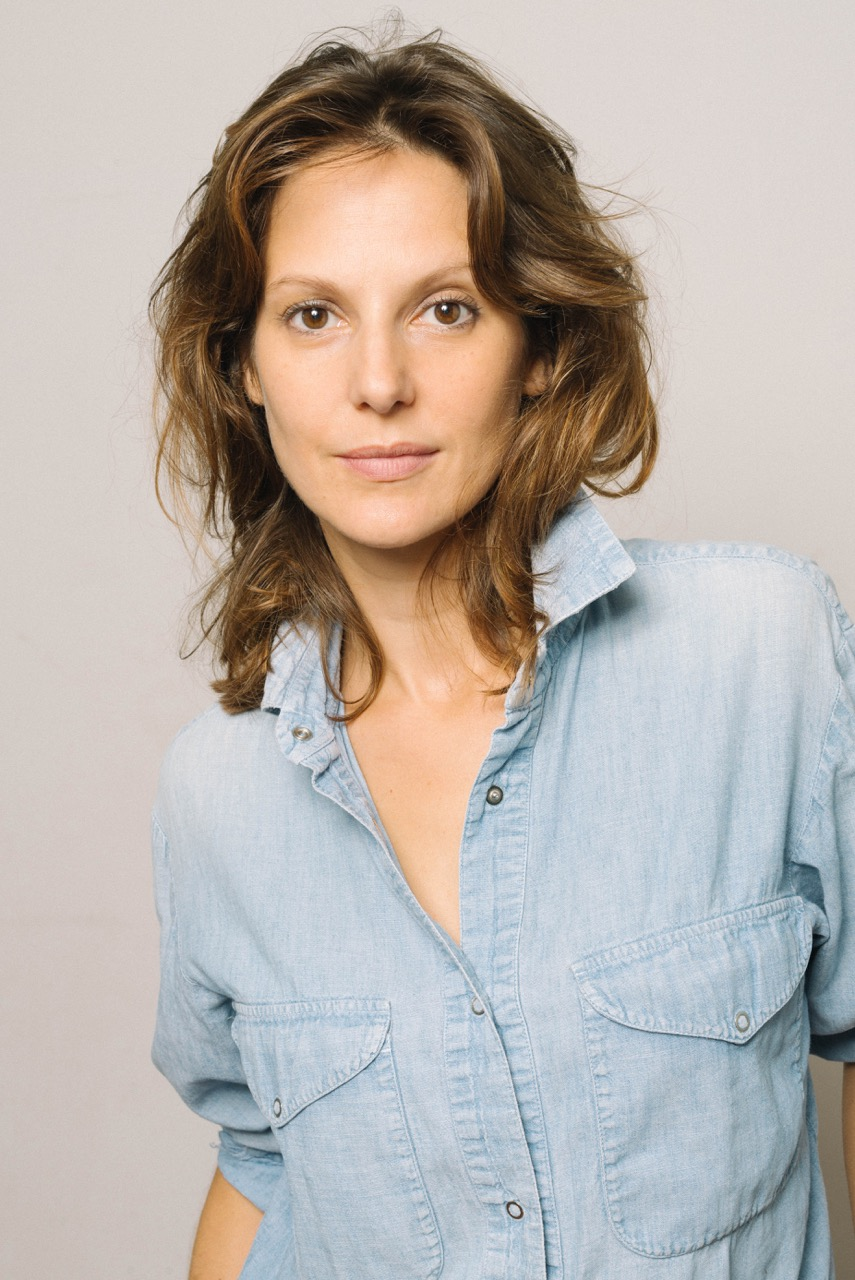
- Navarre in 2018
- Born: 21 January 1979 (age 46); Paris, France
- Occupation: Actress
- Years active: 1996–present

Élodie Navarre (born 21 January 1979) is a French actress.

== Biography ==
Navarre was discovered at 16 when she was spotted on the Paris metro by a casting director and, a year later, appeared in the television film Clara et le Juge. She studied at the Conservatoire d’art dramatique in the 10th arrondissement of Paris and, aged 20, began her professional career as an actor, appearing at the Théâtre de la Criée in Marseille.

When she was 22, Navarre suffered multiple fractures after being hit by a motorist while on holiday in Greece, taking a year to recover. She has since appeared in theatre, film and television.

From 2005 to 2007, Navarre was in a relationship with fellow actor Guillaume Canet.

== Filmography ==
=== Feature films ===
Year	Title	Role	Director	Notes
1996	Love, etc.	Eléonore	Marion Vernoux	
1997	Tangier Cop	Élise	Stephen Whittaker	
1999	Mes amis	Isabelle	Michel Hazanavicius	
2000	Crime Scenes	Marie Bourgoin	Frédéric Schoendoerffer	
2000	Le Prof	Pauline	Alexandre Jardin	
2002	He Loves Me... He Loves Me Not	Anita	Laetitia Colombani	
2003	Gomez et Tavarès	Paulina	Gilles Paquet-Brenner	
2003	Love Me If You Dare	Aurélie Miller	Yann Samuell	
2004	Grande École	Émeline	Robert Salis	
2005	Le Souffleur	Mélanie	Guillaume Pixie	
2005	Avant qu'il ne soit trop tard	Solange	Laurent Dussaux	
2005	Empire of the Wolves	La fliquette	Chris Nahon	
2005	Cavalcade	Blandine	Steve Suissa	
2006	L'École pour tous	Pivoine	Éric Rochant	
2007	Danse avec lui	Lucie	Valérie Guignabodet	
2007	Jean de la Fontaine, le défi	La Duchesse de Bouillon	Daniel Vigne	
2007	Conversations with My Gardener	Carole	Jean Becker	
2009	No Pasaran	Scarlett	Emmanuel Caussé and Éric Martin	
2009	Une affaire d'État	Katryn	Éric Valette	
2010	Les Aventures de Philibert, capitaine puceau	Inès	Sylvain Fusée	
2011	The Art of Love	Vanessa	Emmanuel Mouret	
2013	Opium	La gitane	Arielle Dombasle	
2016	Paris Can Wait	Carole	Eleanor Coppola	
2020	L'Étreinte	Gaston's wife	Ludovic Bergery	
2022	Notre-Dame on Fire	La maman de la petite Chloé	Jean-Jacques Annaud	
2022	Les Femmes du square	Claire Berthuis	Julien Rambaldi	
2023	Visions	Charlotte	Yann Gozlan	
2025	Flush	Valentine	Grégory Morin	Won Audience Award at the Fantasia

=== Television ===
Year	Title	Role	Notes
1997	Clara et son Juge	Clara	Television film
1997	Le Garçon d'orage	Jeanne	Television film
1998	Les Marmottes	Lola	Miniseries
1999	L'Occasionnelle	Mélanie	Television film
1999	La route à l'envers	Lucia	Television film
1999	Avocats et Associés	Aurélie Cordère	Episode: "L'affaire Cindy"
2000	Louis Page	Isabelle	Episode: "Les gens du voyage"
2001	Fatou la Malienne	Gaëlle	Television film
2001	L'Apprentissage de la ville	Lucrèce	Television film
2003	Un amour en kit	Delphine	Television film
2003	Fruits mûrs	Sandrine Ricœur	Television film
2004	L'Insaisissable	Maxime Kovacs, la fille	Television film
2004	Pierre et Jean	Tanya Doubrovski	Television film
2005	Les Femmes d'abord	Éva	Television film
2006	Lettres de la mer rouge	Armgart	Television film
2006	Poussière d'amour	Caroline	Television film
2006	Sable Noir	Julia	Episode: "La villa du crépuscule"
2007	Reporters	Sophie Kosinski	4 episodes
2007	Le Clan Pasquier	Cécile Pasquier	Episode: "Les années d'espérance"
2008	Drôle de Noël	Valérie	Television film
2009	L'École du pouvoir	Caroline Séguier	Television film
2010	Les Châtaigniers du désert	Marie	Television film
2013	Shanghai blues, nouveau monde	Marine	Television film
2013	Les Petits Meurtres d'Agatha Christie	Elvire	Episode: "Meurtre au Champagne"
2015–2017	Le Bureau des légendes	Émilie Duflot	6 episodes
2017	La Mante	Szofia Kovacs	Miniseries
2017	Mystère Place Vendôme	Albertine d'Alencourt	Television film
2018–2019	Kepler(s)	Anne Kepler	6 episodes
2018	Meurtres en Cornouaille	Katell Morvan	Television film

=== Theatre ===
Year	Title	Playwright	Mise en scène	Theatre	Notes
2000	Les Fausses Confidences	Marivaux	Gildas Bourdet		
2000	On ne badine pas avec l'amour	Alfred de Musset	Jean-Louis Bihoreau		
2005	L'Autre	Florian Zeller	Annick Blancheteau	Théâtre des Petits Mathurins	
2007	Médée	Jean Anouilh	Ladislas Chollat		
2007	En toute confiance	Donald Margulies	Michel Fagadau		
2009	Médée	Jean Anouilh	Ladislas Chollat		
2010	Une comédie romantique	Gérald Sibleyras	Christophe Lidon	Théâtre Montparnasse	
2010	Chien-Chien	Fabrice Roger-Lacan	Jérémie Lippmann	Théâtre de l'Atelier	
2011	Sunderland	Clément Koch	Stéphane Hillel	Théâtre de Paris	
2013	Sunderland	Clément Koch	Stéphane Hillel	Tour	
2014	Le Misanthrope	Molière	Michèle André	Festival d'Avignon, Théâtre Actuel	
2015	Les Cartes du pouvoir	Beau Willimon	Ladislas Chollat	Théâtre Hébertot	
2016	Encore une histoire d'amour	Tom Kempinski	Ladislas Chollat	Théâtre des Champs-Élysées	
2018	Le Fils	Florian Zeller	Ladislas Chollat	Théâtre des Champs-Élysées	

=== Music videos ===
Year	Title	Artist	Director	Notes
1997	"On ira"	Jean-Jacques Goldman	Gérard Namiand	
2014	"Tears of Joy"	Prince of Assyria	Lidwine Herduin	

== Awards and nominations ==
- 2010: Prix Suzanne Bianchetti
- 2013: Chistera du public for her short film Ce sera tout pour aujourd'hui at the Festival international des jeunes réalisateurs de Saint-Jean-de-Luz
- 2018: Nomination for the Molière Award for Best Supporting Actress for Le Fils by Florian Zeller, mise en scène by Ladislas Chollat.
