= Ben Smithard =

British cinematographer

- Education: Bournemouth and Poole College of Art and Design
- Occupation: Cinematographer
- Years active: 1993–present

Ben Smithard, B.S.C., is a British cinematographer known for his work on period pieces, such as the films The Damned United (2009), My Week with Marilyn (2011), Goodbye Christopher Robin, The Man Who Invented Christmas (both 2017), Blinded by the Light and Downton Abbey (both 2019).

In television, Smithard served as cinematographer on the 2007 BBC One series Cranford (2007). He returned for the subsequent series Return to Cranford in 2009, for which he won a Primetime Emmy Award for Outstanding Cinematography. In 2012, Smithard received a nomination for Best Cinematography in a Television Drama by the British Society of Cinematographers for his work on the "Henry IV, Part I" and "Henry IV, Part II" episodes of the BBC Two series The Hollow Crown.

== Filmography ==
=== Film ===
Year	Title	Director	Ref(s)
2004	Breaking the Fifth	Austin Smithard	
2009	The Damned United	Tom Hooper	
2010	The Trip	Michael Winterbottom	
2011	My Week with Marilyn	Simon Curtis	
2012	I, Anna	Barnaby Southcombe	
2013	Alan Partridge: Alpha Papa	Declan Lowney	
2013	Belle	Amma Asante	
2015	The Second Best Exotic Marigold Hotel	John Madden	
2017	Viceroy's House	Gurinder Chadha	
2017	Goodbye Christopher Robin	Simon Curtis	
2017	The Man Who Invented Christmas	Bharat Nalluri	
2019	Blinded by the Light	Gurinder Chadha	
2019	Downton Abbey	Michael Engler	
2020	The Father	Florian Zeller	
2022	The Son	Florian Zeller	
2022	The Bubble	Judd Apatow	
2022	Allelujah	Richard Eyre	
2023	Freud's Last Session	Matthew Brown	
2024	Lonely Planet	Susannah Grant	
2025	Downton Abbey: The Grand Finale	Simon Curtis	
2026	Bunker	Florian Zeller	

Documentary film

Year	Title	Director	Notes
2006	Glastonbury	Julien Temple	Shared credit with Julien Temple and Terry Flaxton

=== Television ===
Year	Title	Director	Notes	Ref
2005	Wire in the Blood	Terry McDonough	Episode "Synchronicity"	
2005	Spooks	Jeremy Lovering	Episodes "The Book" and "The Innocent"	
2006	The Street	Terry McDonough	Episodes "The Flasher" and "Football"	
2006	The Royle Family	Mark Mylod	Episode "The Queen of Sheba"	
2007	Cranford	Simon Curtis; Steve Hudson	5 episodes	
2009	10 Minute Tales	Richard Eyre	Episode "The Three Kings"	
2010	The Trip	Michael Winterbottom	Season 1	
2012	The Hollow Crown	Richard Eyre	Episode "Henry IV" (Part 1 and Part 2)	
2016	Cold Feet	Terry McDonough	2 episodes	
2021	The Nevers	David Semel	Episodes "Ignition" and "Undertaking"	

Miniseries

Year	Title	Director	Notes
2006	Eleventh Hour	Terry McDonough	Episodes "Resurrection" and "Containment"
2009	The Day of the Triffids	Nick Copus	
2010	Money	Jeremy Lovering	
2012	True Love	Dominic Savage	
2026	VisionQuest	Vincenzo Natali	Episodes "Firewall" and "Deadlock"

TV movies

Year	Title	Director
2007	Instinct	Terry McDonough
2009	A Short Stay in Switzerland	Simon Curtis
2009	Freefall	Dominic Savage
2015	Esio Trot	Dearbhla Walsh
2015	The Dresser	Richard Eyre
2017	Diana and I	Peter Cattaneo
2018	King Lear	Richard Eyre
