= Floride (film) =

- Film poster
- Directed by: Philippe Le Guay
- Screenplay by: Philippe Le Guay; Jérôme Tonnerre
- Based on: Le Père by Florian Zeller
- Produced by: Philippe Carcassonne; Jean-Louis Livi
- Starring: Jean Rochefort; Sandrine Kiberlain
- Cinematography: Jean-Claude Larrieu
- Edited by: Monica Coleman
- Music by: Jorge Arriagada
- Production companies: F Comme Film; Ciné@ Gaumont; Cinéfrance 1888; France 2 Cinéma; Rhône-Alpes Cinéma
- Distributed by: Gaumont
- Release dates: 9 August 2015 (Locarno); 12 August 2015 (France)
- Running time: 110 minutes
- Country: France
- Language: French
- Budget: $8 million
- Box office: $3 million

Floride is a 2015 French comedy-drama film directed by Philippe Le Guay and starring Jean Rochefort and Sandrine Kiberlain. The screenplay was written by Le Guay and Jérôme Tonnerre, based on the 2012 play Le Père by Florian Zeller. The film had its premiere at the Locarno International Film Festival in August 2015.

== Cast ==
- Jean Rochefort as Claude Lherminier
- Sandrine Kiberlain as Carole Lherminier
- Laurent Lucas as Thomas
- Anamaria Marinca as Ivona
- Clément Métayer as Robin
- Coline Beal as Juliette
- Edith Le Merdy as Madame Forgeat
- Stéphanie Bataille as The director of the nursing home
- Philippe Duclos as Dr. Farkoa
- Audrey Looten as Alice
- David Clark as Andrew
- Patrick d'Assumçao as the Man in pavilion

== Production ==
The film was shot entirely on location in Annecy from 16 September to 25 October 2014.

== Reception ==
Reviewing for the Montreal Gazette, Brendan Kelly gives the film 3.5 of 5 stars, and writes:

There are many reasons to see French writer-director Philippe Le Guay's Floride. In a movie world dominated by stories focused on young, beautiful people, this moving drama shines the light on one rather cranky 81-year-old man. That's one plus. It’s also a flick that will resonate with those of us who’ve spent serious time grappling with the challenges of helping out our aging parents. But the real reason you have to see Floride is for the masterful lead performance from 85-year-old actor Jean Rochefort.
