= Stardust (2020 film) =

2020 biopic about David Bowie by Gabriel Range

- Theatrical release poster
- Directed by: Gabriel Range
- Written by: Christopher Bell; Gabriel Range
- Produced by: Paul Van Carter; Nick Taussig; Matt Code
- Starring: Johnny Flynn; Jena Malone; Marc Maron
- Cinematography: Nicholas D. Knowland
- Edited by: Chris Gill
- Music by: Anne Nikitin
- Production companies: Salon Pictures; Wildling Pictures
- Distributed by: Vertigo Films (United Kingdom); Elevation Pictures (Canada)
- Release dates: 16 October 2020 (SDIFF); 25 November 2020 (United States)
- Running time: 109 min
- Countries: United Kingdom; Canada
- Language: English
- Box office: $62,251

Stardust is a 2020 biographical drama film about English singer-songwriter David Bowie and his alter-ego Ziggy Stardust, directed by Gabriel Range, from screenplay co-written by Range with Christopher Bell. Johnny Flynn stars as Bowie, alongside Jena Malone and Marc Maron in supporting roles.

Stardust was released in the United States on November 25, 2020 by IFC Films. It received negative reviews from critics and only grossed $62,251 at the box office.

== Premise ==
The film focuses on Bowie's abortive first tour of the US in 1971, his troubled relationships with his wife Angie and half-brother Terry Burns, and his creation of the Ziggy Stardust persona.

== Cast ==
- Johnny Flynn as David Bowie
- Marc Maron as Ron Oberman, Bowie’s publicist.
- Jena Malone as Angie Bowie
- Derek Moran as Terry Jones
- Anthony Flanagan as Dr. Reynolds
- Julian Richings as Tony DeFries
- Aaron Poole as Mick Ronson
- James Cade as Marc Bolan
- Jeremy Legat as Woody Woodmansey
- Monica Parker as Mrs. Oberman
- Roanna Cocharne as Charlotte Banks
- Jorja Cadence as June Bolan
- Annie Briggs as Jeanie Richardson
- Ryan Blakley as Tom Classon
- Gord Rand as Michael Oberman

== Production ==
=== Casting ===
In August 2019, Johnny Flynn was revealed in a first image portraying Bowie. Marc Maron, Jena Malone, Aaron Poole, Roanna Cocharne, Jorja Cadence, Annie Briggs, and Ryan Blakley were cast in supporting roles, along with Jeremy Legat and James Cade.

=== Filming ===
Filming commenced on 4 July 2019, taking place in Hamilton, Ontario, Canada, and also in the United States, and concluded later in September 2019.

=== Music ===
Bowie's estate did not approve the film and did not grant rights to use Bowie's music. Instead, Stardust has Bowie performing covers the real Bowie performed in this period, such as "I Wish You Would" by The Yardbirds and "Amsterdam" by Jacques Brel.

== Release ==
Stardust was scheduled to premiere at the Tribeca Film Festival in April 2020, but the festival was cancelled due to the COVID-19 pandemic. Instead, the film premiered on October 16, 2020 at the San Diego International Film Festival. In August 2020, IFC Films acquired U.S. distribution rights, and released it on November 25, 2020.

== Reception ==
On Rotten Tomatoes, the film has an approval rating of 19% based on 73 reviews with an average rating of 4.3/10. The critics' consensus on the website reads, "Ground control to Major Tom, Stardust did not put its helmet on.", a joking take on the opening lines of "Space Oddity". On Metacritic, the film has a score of 35 out of 100 based on 19 reviews, indicating "generally unfavorable reviews".

The A.V. Club's Ignatiy Vishnevetsky referred to the production as "velvet garbage" and concluding the film's version of Bowie to be "simply a mediocre jerk who needs roleplaying therapy to deal with his demons." Simran Hans of The Observer gave the film one out of five and wrote: "the whole thing feels strangely pedestrian, unable to capture or channel Bowie's maverick spirit." Peter Bradshaw of The Guardian gave the film two out of five, describing it as "a strained, frustrating concoction that doesn’t do its subject justice", though he praised Flynn's performance as Bowie. Clarisse Loughrey of The Independent also praised Flynn's performance, writing: "The actor-musician... is convincing as a tortured glam rocker – just not the one who ever sang about Major Tom’s interplanetary adventures." She also gave the film two out of five. Tara Brady of The Irish Times also gave the film two out of five, writing: "Exasperating viewing for fans and certain to baffle newcomers, it's a curious, imaginative thing, but who exactly is it for?" David Rooney of The Hollywood Reporter deemed it "a mostly listless odyssey, its lack of excitement compounded by the absence of Bowie's music."

James Mottram of the South China Morning Post gave the film three out of five stars, writing: "If you compare Stardust to Bohemian Rhapsody or Rocketman ... then this David Bowie drama is like a rare groove B-side." Kate Erbland of IndieWire gave the film a C+, writing that "while there are flashes of originality in the film's script — which quite artfully builds on Bowie's worries with a distinctly personal edge — most of it is relatively straightforward, never as psychedelic or sophisticated as its opening shot". In NME, Mark Beaumont gave the film four out of five, writing that it worked better as a "revelatory road-trip movie" rather than a biopic. He felt the lack of Bowie's music "robs the film of the sense that Bowie's glowering talent was being criminally ignored". Marjorie Baumgarten of The Austin Chronicle wrote: "Even though Stardust is not coated in gossamer, the film still has some glittery moments."
