= Gascoigne (film) =

- Directed by: Jane Preston
- Screenplay by: Jane Preston
- Produced by: Paul Van Carter, Nick Taussig, Jane Preston
- Starring: Paul Gascoigne; Gary Lineker; Wayne Rooney; José Mourinho; Terry Wogan
- Cinematography: Patrick Smith
- Edited by: Olivia Baldwin
- Music by: Chad Hobson; Ian Masterson
- Production company: Salon Pictures
- Release date: 2015
- Running time: 86 minutes
- Language: English

Gascoigne is a 2015 documentary about the English footballer Paul Gascoigne.

== Reception ==
The film received mostly positive reviews.
