= Churchill (film) =

- Theatrical release poster
- Directed by: Jonathan Teplitzky
- Written by: Alex von Tunzelmann
- Produced by: Nick Taussig; Paul Van Carter; Piers Tempest; Claudia Bluemhuber
- Starring: Brian Cox; Miranda Richardson; John Slattery; Ella Purnell; James Purefoy
- Cinematography: David Higgs
- Edited by: Chris Gill
- Music by: Lorne Balfe
- Production companies: Silver Reel; Salon Pictures; Embankment Films
- Distributed by: Lionsgate
- Release dates: 25 April 2017 (Barcelona); 16 June 2017 (United Kingdom)
- Running time: 98 minutes
- Country: United Kingdom
- Language: English
- Budget: $10 million
- Box office: $5.4 million

Churchill is a 2017 British historical war-drama film directed by Jonathan Teplitzky, which portrays Winston Churchill in June 1944 – especially in the hours leading up to D-Day. The film stars Brian Cox as the title character, with Miranda Richardson and John Slattery in supporting roles.

The film was released on 2 June 2017.

== Plot ==
Exhausted by years of war, Winston Churchill awaits the 1944 Normandy landings, which he believes will be a disaster.

== Cast ==
- Brian Cox as Winston Churchill
- Miranda Richardson as Clementine Churchill
- John Slattery as General Dwight D. Eisenhower
- Julian Wadham as General Bernard Montgomery
- Richard Durden as General Jan Smuts
- Ella Purnell as Helen Garrett
- Danny Webb as Field Marshal Alan Brooke, 1st Viscount Alanbrooke
- Jonathan Aris as Air Chief Marshal Trafford Leigh-Mallory
- George Anton as Admiral Bertram Ramsay
- Steven Cree as Group Captain James Stagg
- James Purefoy as King George VI
- Peter Ormond as Asa Briggs
- Angela Costello as Kay Summersby
- Kevin Findlay as Fanshawe
- Miro Teplitzky as Adjutant Howard

== Production ==
On 4 November 2015, it was reported that Brian Cox would star as Winston Churchill in Churchill after Gary Oldman turned it down. Brian Welsh would direct from a script by Alex von Tunzelmann. On 12 February 2016 it was reported that Jonathan Teplitzky would replace Welsh as director. Miranda Richardson and Stanley Tucci would also join the cast as Clementine Churchill and Dwight D. Eisenhower, respectively. On 28 April 2016, John Slattery replaced Tucci. On 24 May 2016 it was announced that principal photography had begun. Some scenes were shot in Edinburgh and Glasgow; Arniston House was used as film location for many of the scenes between Gen. Eisenhower and Churchill, specifically the Oak Room as Gen Eisenhower's war room and the north exterior.

== Reception ==
On the review aggregator site Rotten Tomatoes the film has an approval rating of 49% based on 116 reviews, with an average rating of 5.2/10. The site's critical consensus reads, "Churchill gets sterling work out of Brian Cox in the leading role, but it isn't enough to overcome a muddled and ultimately unsuccessful approach to an incredible real-life story." On Metacritic, which assigns a weighted average rating to reviews, the film has a score of 44 out of 100, based on 25 critics, indicating "mixed or average reviews".

Noted Churchill biographer Andrew Roberts gave the film a scathing review, saying that a series of historical errors made Winston Churchill almost unrecognisable. After praising the film's acting, photography, and music, he wrote that the film failed due to a script filled with blatant errors, grossly mischaracterizing Churchill on numerous points. About the film's author, who, while a historian, is not a WWII scholar, he wrote, "The only problem with the movie – written by the historian Alex von Tunzelmann – is that it gets absolutely everything wrong. Never in the course of movie-making have so many specious errors been made in so long a film by so few writers." His review went into detail on numerous errors, such as the false portrayal of Churchill as anti-American, or claims that he dithered about Operation Overlord (the Normandy landing), or the marital strife with his wife, Clementine. None of these points have a basis in fact, according to Roberts.

Robbie Collin of The Daily Telegraph rated the film 4/5 stars and said that "Brian Cox dazzles in a scalpel-sharp, timely lesson in political leadership", while Peter Bradshaw, writing for The Guardian, noted that "Miranda Richardson shrewdly plays Churchill's wife Clemmie: imperious, exasperated, gimlet-eyed", and rated the film 3/5 stars. In The Independent rated the film 3/5 stars and wrote "There are elements of both King Lear and of Colonel Blimp about Cox's Churchill. Like Blimp, he's a man out of time, accused of trying to fight a modern war with a mindset stuck years in the past. Like Lear, he is an old man, raging against the elements." In Time Out magazine, Tom Huddleston rated the film 3/5 stars and wrote "Cox is rudely magnificent, capturing not just the wilfulness of the man but the nagging self-doubt at his inner core." Peter Travers, writing for Rolling Stone, said Brian Cox's performance "cannot be faulted. It's a master class in acting", and gave the film 3/4 stars. Gary Goldstein of the Los Angeles Times wrote, "Brian Cox's towering performance in Churchill is worthy of the great man himself". In the Radio Times, Alan Jones said Cox "gives a tremendous performance as the charismatic politician who inspired Great Britain to resist Adolf Hitler."

Ignatiy Vishnevetsky of The A.V. Club described the film as "inert, decorous, and almost absurdly repetitive," and wrote: "All too often, it toes the line that separates legitimately stupid movies from ones that merely presume that the viewer is stupid."

Brian Cox said that he talked to military experts from the Sandhurst military academy about Churchill's own plan to invade Europe, and that "... they said it would have probably shortened the war by six months."
