= Nick Taussig =

British author and film producer (born 1973)

Nick Taussig (/ˈtaʊsɪk/; born 26 March 1973) is a British author and film producer. In his writing he is known for exploring themes of personal freedom, identity, truth and moral transgression in works such as Love and Mayhem (2005), Don Don (2007), Gorilla Guerrilla (2008) and The Distinguished Assassin (2013).

He was educated at Rokeby School and Dulwich College. After graduating from Durham University with a First Class degree in Philosophy and Literature, he went on to UCL School of Slavonic and East European Studies where he completed a Master's in Russian Literature. Taussig initially worked in film before writing his first novel in 2005. He married the Czech artist Klara Cecmanova in 2010. He is also co-founder of The Mtaala Foundation, an education partnership and sponsorship program to create and support a school for vulnerable children and at-risk youth in Uganda; and a trustee of Harrison's Fund, a medical research charity committed to getting as much money as possible into the hands of the world's best researchers, who are working to find a cure for Duchenne muscular dystrophy, a fatal genetic disease.

== Writing ==
In Taussig's fiction, common perceptions of human nature are challenged, the writer exploring themes of love, sexual desire, insanity, poverty, violence and death, the last of which he discussed when he appeared at the Hay Festival on 9 June 2007. Taussig confronts his readers with shocking aspects of humanity, intending to force them to reflect and reevaluate.

Taussig's first novel, Love and Mayhem, received significant critical acclaim. Paul Blezard described it as "an absolutely stunning debut novel. It is for the lovelorn, and for those in love. It is just very well-written." However, others responded less favourably to this "twisted tale of love set in a darker side of London", in the words of the literary critic Daneet Steffens. Writing in Time Out in the 31 August 2005 issue of the magazine, Steffens concluded that though the novel contains "sly plot twists and persuasive [characters] … some of it comes off as [no more than] cathartic release", though "whispers of promising novels – or movies – to come." In the writing of it, Taussig reportedly drew on his own experiences in his study of madness and the fine line between reason and unreason, this "adding a further edge to proceedings", according to the critic Kingsley Marshall, writing in Notion magazine in July 2005.

In his second book, Don Don, Taussig continued to explore uncompromising subject matter, in his depiction of "Don Holmes … a man with a string of failed marriages who's never happier than when he's hoovering up drugs, blowing away business competitors or getting blown by a couple of girls", according to Tom Boncza-Tomaszewski, writing in The Independent on Sunday on 4 March 2007. The critic described Taussig as "clearly a talented writer", but felt the novel "got polished so hard it lost its definition." Others, however, responded to it more positively, BBC's Marie-Louise Muir calling it a "remarkable book" and the critic Paul Blezard describing it as "pithy and funny, mature and intelligent." While writing Don Don, Taussig spent time both in America and Thailand, in an attempt to live as his fictional characters do, "going to extraordinary lengths in order to research [his] books", in the words of broadcaster Jamie Owen, who interviewed Taussig for BBC Radio Wales on 27 March 2007.

Taussig entered new territory with his third novel, Gorilla Guerrilla, a book that describes the relationship between a boy soldier and a silverback gorilla. In a feature for The Independent on Sunday on 8 December 2008, Taussig wrote about what inspired the novel, a meeting with "a 14-year-old with a pronounced limp and a heavy scar on the top of his head [whose] slight build and baby face belied the horror experienced in his short life. Before he'd even hit puberty he had shot enemy troops, looted villages and brutally murdered civilians – and all against his will." Influenced by the work of the contemporary philosopher John N. Gray, in particular Straw Dogs: Thoughts on Humans and Other Animals, the book, amongst other things, "renders the barriers that we erect between our species and others to protect our sense of uniqueness otiose", according to the poet Nicholas Green.

His most recent novel, The Distinguished Assassin, tells the story of Professor Aleksei Klebnikov, a persecuted intellectual's revenge against Russian Communists, which, according to Marcel Berlins writing in The Times on 8 June 2013, "is told in alternate chapters covering his time as prisoner and after his release. Through Klebnikov, the plight of the Russian people under Stalinist rule is grippingly demonstrated. Taussig's style – short on dialogue and long on descriptions and Klebnikov's thoughts – takes a bit of getting used to, but turns out to be effective for the passionate political and emotional content of his novel."

== Published works ==
=== Fiction ===
- Love and Mayhem (2005)
- Don Don (2007)
- Gorilla Guerrilla (2008)
- The Distinguished Assassin (2013)

== Producing ==
Taussig has produced feature films such as Stardust (2020), Audrey (2020), the double BAFTA nominee McQueen (2018), Churchill (2017), Lek and the Dogs (2017) and My Name Is Lenny (2017). He was also executive producer for the BAFTA-nominated political documentary, Taking Liberties (2007), a film about the erosion of Civil liberties in the United Kingdom and the increase of surveillance under the government of Tony Blair.
