= Ustinov Studio =

Theatre in Bath, England

Coordinates: 51°22′54″N 2°21′49″W

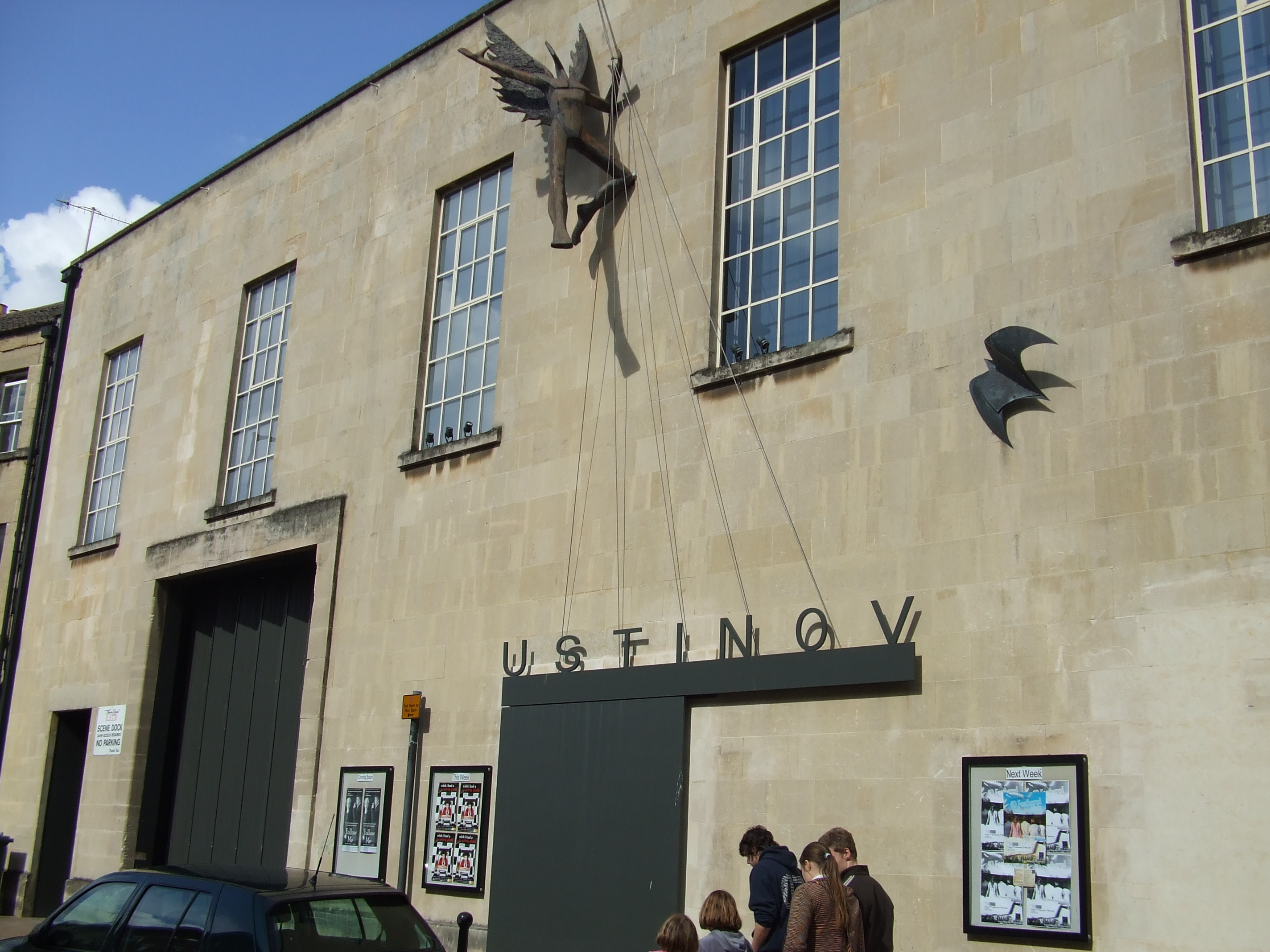
- Interactive map of Ustinov Studio
- Address: Bath; England
- Capacity: 126

Construction
- Architect: Haworth Tompkins

Website
- https://www.theatreroyal.org.uk/your-visit/ustinov/

The Ustinov Studio is a studio theatre in Bath, England. It is the Theatre Royal's second space, built in mid 1990s at the rear of the building on Monmouth Street. It is named after the actor Peter Ustinov who led the fundraising programme for the Studio's creation in the early 1990s.

In 2006 it closed for a £1.5million, 15-month refurbishment undertaken by Haworth Tompkins. The Ustinov Studio re-opened in February 2008, following a period of closure for refurbishment, with their own production of Breakfast With Mugabe starring Joseph Marcell, Miles Anderson and Nicholas Bailey.

From 2015, the studio was led by the Artistic Director Laurence Boswell. In the 2012 American Season at the Ustinov Studio, Sarah Ruhl's In the Next Room (or The Vibrator Play) was the winner of the Best New Play — Theatre Awards UK 2012 and nominated for three Tony Awards. The Ustinov Studio was also nominated for the Empty Space ... Peter Brook Award 2012. The Daily Telegraph's Dominic Cavendish praised the venue as a "constantly bubbling fount of marvels" at the awards ceremony. The Ustinov also received a second consecutive nomination for the 2013 awards.

In autumn 2013, the Ustinov presented The Spanish Golden Age Season, three new translations of rarely seen plays. These included the tragedy Punishment without Revenge, and the romantic comedies Don Gil of the Green Breeches and A Lady of Little Sense, which ran in repertory with a cast of ten actors in all three plays between September and December 2013. It was later transferred to the Arcola Theatre.

In summer 2014, the Ustinov Studio presented a new comedy, Bad Jews, and in November of the same year, a black comedy by Florian Zeller, The Father, starring Kenneth Cranham. Both plays went on to national and international success in the following two years, running almost continuously on several tours and West End transfers, culminating in Kenneth Cranham winning the Olivier Award for Best Actor in a Play at the 2016 Awards Ceremony.
