= Cathy Featherstone =

British set decorator

- Born: London, England
- Occupation: Set decorator

Cathy Featherstone is a British set decorator. She was nominated for an Academy Award in the category Best Production Design for the film The Father.

== Selected filmography ==
- The Father (2020; co-nominated with Peter Francis)
