= Offender (film) =

- Directed by: Ron Scalpello
- Written by: Paul Van Carter
- Produced by: Paul Van Carter; Nick Taussig, Stephen Mitchell, Rhys David Thomas
- Starring: Kimberley Nixon; Shaun Dooley; Joe Cole; Tyson Oba; Vas Blackwood; Ruth Gemmell; David Ajala; Doon Mackichan
- Cinematography: Richard Mott
- Edited by: Johnny Rayner
- Music by: Chad Hobson
- Production companies: Gunslinger Films & Revolver Entertainment. An RDT Co-Production
- Distributed by: Revolver Entertainment
- Release date: 8 August 2012
- Running time: 102 minutes
- Country: United Kingdom
- Language: English

Offender is a 2012 British action film which follows a hard grafting, 20-year-old working-class man, Tommy Nix, who while avoiding getting mixed up in the wrong crowd sees his girlfriend fall victim to a brutal attack. It stars Kimberley Nixon, Joe Cole, Shaun Dooley, Vas Blackwood and rapper English Frank. It is written by Paul Van Carter and directed by Ron Scalpello.

== Cast ==
- Kimberley Nixon as Elise
- Shaun Dooley as Nash
- Joe Cole as Tommy
- English Frank as Jake
- Tyson Oba as Mason
- G FrSH as Angelface
- Daniel Kendrick as Sicko
- Scorcher as Essay
- Malachi Kirby as Harry
- David Ajala as Kelvin
- Ruth Gemmell as Cassie
- Mark Harris as Governor Davies
- Jacob Anderson as Patrick
- Vas Blackwood as Detective Boaz
- Doon Mackichan as the Doctor Patricia
- Can Somer as the Muslim Inmate
- Michael Edwards as Prison Officer
- Rimmel Daniel as Prison inmate
- Ric Ashley Smith as Pillion
- Mic Righteous as himself

== Reception ==
The film received mixed reviews from critics, with a 68% score on review aggregator Rotten Tomatoes. Empire magazine and Total Film both rated it 3/5, with Empire Magazine stating it was "a solid revenge thriller in which Cole excels" The Guardian gave it one star, stating "the plot and characters are lame and implausible, the dialogue is banal and the acting mediocre". Time Out claimed the film "feels less Scum and more like the back-story of one of Guy Ritchie’s knuckle-headed footsoldiers."

The film received a 4/5 rating from Heat magazine stating "this bloody borstal drama makes quiet political points alongside a powerful revenge storyline" and a 4/5 rating from Sky Movies calling it an "admirably crafted a compelling drama" and likening it to French prison film A Prophet and Alan Clarke's 1979 film Scum.

CineVue presented a 3/5 review for the film, stating that "Scalpello's Offender is far from original" However it presented "enjoyable performances and an entertaining revenge plot."

In general the reviews rate the film for its depiction of characters involved in and affected by the riots. The Londonist states "It’s a surprisingly comprehensive look at the lives of young criminals, in particular their sense of isolation and disenchantment with a corrupt system."

The film gained more positive reviews from urban and music press. Music sites Bring The Noise and MTV have rated the film 8/10 and 7/10 respectively.
