= Peter Francis (art director) =

English art director and production designer

- Born: Peter William Francis; 1965 (age 60–61); Beverley, Yorkshire, England
- Occupations: Art director, production designer

Peter William Francis (born 1965) is an English art director and production designer. He was nominated for an Academy Award in the category Best Production Design for the film The Father.

== Selected filmography ==
- The Father (2020; co-nominated with Cathy Featherstone)
