= Prince of Assyria =

Swedish singer songwriter of Iraqi Assyrian origin

- Born: Ninos Dankha; Baghdad, Iraq
- Origin: Sweden
- Genres: Indie, folk, singer-songwriter
- Years active: 2009–present
- Labels: Kning Disk, Soliti, Busy Bee, PoA Records
- Website: www.princeofassyria.com

Prince of Assyria is the stage name of Swedish-Iraqi singer and songwriter Ninos Dankha. His music blends elements of Scandinavian folk and subtle Middle Eastern influences, often described as melancholic and introspective.

== Biography ==
Ninos Dankha was born in Baghdad, Iraq, and moved to Sweden with his family when he was less than one year old.

He first gained attention in 2009 with the single “What Ever You Want”, released by the Swedish label Kning Disk. His debut album, Missing Note, was released in 2009/2010 and was noted for its sparse arrangements and lyrical tone. The follow-up, Changing Places, appeared in 2014 on the Finnish label Soliti. His third album, 3rd Level (2020), continued his minimalist sound and received a 4/5 review from Swedish daily Dagens Nyheter.

== Musical style ==
Dankha’s music is characterized by a mixture of Nordic melancholy and Middle Eastern tonality, often using minimal arrangements, acoustic instrumentation, and introspective lyrics.

== Reception ==
Prince of Assyria has received positive critical attention in both Scandinavian and international media. In a review for Dagens Nyheter, Mattias Dahlström described his music as “very beautiful folk pop” (väldigt vacker folkpop). Télérama highlighted the honesty and vulnerability of his performance, stating that “his music demands honesty on stage.” In The Forumist, writer Pejman Birounvand compared Dankha’s sound to that of Nick Drake and Tim Buckley, citing its “searching expression and pared-back honesty.”

== Discography ==
Albums

- Missing Note (2009/2010)
- Changing Places (2014)
- 3rd Level (2020)
- BOOK #4 (2025)

Selected singles

- “What Ever You Want” (2009)
