= The Height of the Storm =

2018 play by Florian Zeller

- Original language: French
- Written by: Florian Zeller
- Characters: Anne; The Woman; The Man; Elise; Madeleine; André
- Subject: Marriage

Premiere
- Date: 1 September 2018
- Place: Richmond Theatre
- Directed by: Jonathan Kent

The Height of the Storm is a play by Florian Zeller which follows a couple looking back at 50 years of marriage and realising their relationship may not be as perfect as they expected.

== Productions ==
A production directed by Jonathan Kent, starring Jonathan Pryce and Eileen Atkins, and produced by Simon Friend, opened at Richmond Theatre on 1 September 2018 as part of a short UK tour. It then transferred to the Wyndham's Theatre in the West End on 9 October 2018, following previews from 2 October. The cast also included Anna Madeley, Amanda Drew and Lucy Cohu. It was translated into English by Christopher Hampton. Atkins was nominated for Best Actress for her performance at the 2019 Olivier Awards

The play opened on Broadway on 10 September 2019 in previews at the Samuel J. Friedman Theatre, produced by the Manhattan Theatre Club, again starring Pryce and Atkins and directed by Jonathan Kent.

== Awards ==
The Wyndham's Theatre performance was named the best theatre show of the year by Michael Billington of The Guardian, and was later ranked by The Guardian writers as the 23rd best theatre show since 2000.
