= Yorgos Lamprinos =

Greek-French film editor

- Occupation: Film editor

Yorgos Lamprinos (Greek: Γιώργος Λαμπρινός) is a Greek-French film editor. He was nominated for an Academy Award in the category Best Film Editing for the film The Father.

In 2021, he won the Los Angeles Film Critics Association Awards for The Father.

== Selected filmography ==
- Custody (2017)
- The Father (2020)
- The Son (2022)
- The Successor (2023)
- The Assessment (2024)

=== Accolades ===
Award	Category	Film	Result	Ref.
Academy Awards	Best Editing	The Father	Nominated	
Austin Film Critics Association Awards	Best Editing	The Father	Nominated	
British Academy Film Awards	Best Editing	The Father	Nominated	
British Independent Film Awards	Best Editing	The Father	Won	
Critics' Choice Movie Awards	Best Editing	The Father	Nominated	
Hollywood Critics Association Awards	Best Editing	The Father	Nominated	
Los Angeles Film Critics Association Awards	Best Editing	The Father	Won	
San Francisco Film Critics Circle Awards	Best Editing	The Father	Nominated	
Satellite Awards	Best Editing	The Father	Nominated	
