= The Son (Zeller play) =

2018 French play by Florian Zeller

Le Fils
- Original language: French
- Written by: Florian Zeller
- Characters: Pierre; Anne; Sofia; Nicolas

Premiere
- Date: 3 February 2018
- Place: Comédie des Champs-Élysées, Paris

The Son (French: Le Fils) is a play by Florian Zeller. It premiered in February 2018 at the Comédie des Champs-Élysées, Paris, with Yvan Attal (Pierre), Anne Consigny (Anne), Élodie Navarre (Sofia) and Rod Paradot (Nicolas). The play was produced again in September 2018, with Stéphane Freiss replacing Attal and Florence Darel replacing Consigny. The play was translated into English by Christopher Hampton and premiered in London in February 2019.

== Background ==
The Son (Le Fils) is the final play in a trilogy which also includes The Mother (La Mère) and The Father (Le Père). The Mother premiered in 2010 at the Théâtre de Paris starring Catherine Hiegel and was produced again in 2014 at Théâtre Hébertot. The Father premiered in 2012 starring Robert Hirsch and was produced again in 2015 at the Comédie des Champs-Élysées. The Father has since been performed in over 45 countries.

== Summary ==
Nicolas is 17 years old and lives with his mother, Anne. His father, Pierre, has just had a child with his new girlfriend, Sofia. Anne informs Pierre that their son, a depressed teenager, has not been to school for three months. Pierre then talks with Nicolas, who asks to come and live with him and Sofia. Pierre accepts, changes his high school and will do everything possible to restore his son's appetite for life.

== Cast ==
- Pierre – Yvan Attal, followed by Stéphane Freiss
- Anne – Anne Consigny, followed by Florence Darel
- Sofia – Elodie Navarre
- Nicolas – Rod Paradot
- The doctor – Jean-Philippe Puymartin, followed by Daniel San Pedro
- The nurse – Raphaël Magnabosco

== Productions ==
The play premiered in February 2018 at the Comédie des Champs-Élysées, Paris, with Yvan Attal (Pierre), Anne Consigny (Anne), Élodie Navarre (Sofia) and Rod Paradot (Nicolas). The play was produced again in September 2018, with Stéphane Freiss replacing Attal and Florence Darel replacing Consigny.

The play was translated into English by Christopher Hampton. It premiered in February 2019 under the direction of Michael Longhurst at the Kiln Theatre with actors John Light, Laurie Kynaston and Amanda Abbington. The play was then transferred to the West End to the Duke of York's Theatre. It has since been produced in many countries.

== Reception ==
Jérôme Béglé of Le Point deemed Le Fils a masterpiece. L'Express critic Christophe Barbier praised its emotional power, writing, "To all the fathers of a son over fifteen, Florian Zeller plants a mirror in the heart."

== Awards and nominations ==
Year	Award	Category	Recipient(s)	Result	Ref.
2018	Molière Award	Molière de la Révélation masculine	Rod Paradot	Won	
2018	Molière Award	Molière du Théâtre privé	Le Fils	Nominated	
2018	Molière Award	Molière de l'Auteur francophone vivant	Florian Zeller	Nominated	
2018	Molière Award	Molière du Metteur en scène d'un spectacle de Théâtre privé	Ladislas Chollat	Nominated	
2018	Molière Award	Molière du Comédien dans un spectacle de Théâtre privé	Yvan Attal	Nominated	
2018	Molière Award	Molière de la Comédienne dans un second rôle	Elodie Navarre	Nominated	
2019	Globe de Cristal Awards	Meilleur Comédien	Rod Paradot	Nominated	
2019	Globe de Cristal Awards	Meilleure Pièce de théâtre	Le Fils	Nominated	

== Film adaptation ==
Florian Zeller directed a film adaptation of the play, The Son. The film had its world premiere at the 79th Venice International Film Festival on 7 September 2022.
