= My Name Is Lenny =

- Directed by: Ron Scalpello
- Written by: Martin Askew; Paul Van Carter
- Produced by: Jamie McLean; Michael Mendelsohn; Nick Taussig; Paul Van Carter
- Starring: Josh Helman; Chanel Cresswell; Michael Bisping
- Cinematography: Federico Alfonzo
- Edited by: Rebecca Lloyd
- Production company: Salon Pictures
- Distributed by: Lionsgate
- Release date: 9 June 2017
- Running time: 91 minutes
- Country: United Kingdom
- Language: English

My Name Is Lenny is a 2017 British drama film directed by Ron Scalpello, and written by Martin Askew and Paul Van Carter. The film stars Josh Helman, Chanel Cresswell, Michael Bisping and John Hurt in his penultimate film role. It tells the story of Lenny McLean's life in the east end of London.

== Plot ==
Lenny McLean is a 27 year old undefeated bare-knuckle boxer who competes in unsanctioned street fights in the East End of London in the late 1970s. During one morning, Lenny spots a poster of undefeated boxer Roy Shaw, dubbed 'the Guv'Nor'. Linking the nickname to his abusive stepfather Jim, an infuriated Lenny immediately agrees to partake in an unsanctioned bout with him. However, Shaw badly beats McLean into a bloody state and fouls him multiple times while downed.

With little funds left, Lenny's cousin John 'Bootnose' Wall provides him with a backyard training camp and several other unsanctioned bouts to earn enough fight money to lure Shaw into a rematch. Following a confrontation at a bar with his cousin Carrots, Lenny beats Carrots close to death and bites into his neck in a drunken rage. His wife, Valerie, is horrified, and begins scorning him for his savage behaviour, leaving him.

An unofficial rematch is held between McLean and Shaw. McLean enacts his revenge and manages to knock Shaw out of the ring, though his wife Valerie is still despondent with him. The contest is deemed a draw, and an immediate rematch is called for with winnings of the last fight being transferred into the third bout. Lenny attempts to atone for his past misdeeds and decides to abstain from drinking ahead of the fight. However, after a bar brawl in which he is stabbed in the leg, he is treated for septicaemia a week later, though he recovers. Lenny and Valerie subsequently reconcile and have sex.

Johnny takes Lenny to a professional boxing gym to be properly taught boxing, and Lenny trains hard and earnestly, as well as paying for the damages he caused in his fight with Carrots.

Prior to the fight, Jim appears in the dressing room and begins taunting Lenny before being threatened by his son to leave. Lenny dominates the subsequent fight with Shaw, knocking him out in the first round and earning the titular title, the 'Guv'Nor'.

End credits show the real Lenny McLean being interviewed, and that upon being crowned the 'Guv'Nor' in 1978, he defended his title up until his death in 1998, all the while being trained by Johnny. Lenny subsequently starred in the 1998 film Lock, Stock and Two Smoking Barrels, with his autobiography simultaneously taking the top spot on book charts as did the film on the box office. Lenny died a week later aged 49. Lenny was survived by his siblings and he also had two children, Jamie and Kelly McLean. Credits also reveal that Valerie passed a decade after Lenny. Carrots never forgave Lenny, but their sons are best friends.

== Cast ==
- Josh Helman as Lenny McLean
  - Jack Veal as young Lenny
- Chanel Cresswell as Valerie McLean
- Michael Bisping as Roy Shaw
- John Hurt as Leslie Salmon
- Nick Moran as Johnny Bootnose
- Charley Palmer Rothwell as Carrots McLean
- Rita Tushingham as Reenie Joyce
- Cathal Pendred as Roofie
- Martin Askew as Lenny's Step-father - Askew, who is Mclean's nephew, also serves as a screenwriter for the film.

== Production ==
Principal photography on the film began on 22 August 2016 in the London neighbourhoods of Hoxton and Islington.
