= The Father (2020 film) =

Psychological drama film directed by Florian Zeller

- UK theatrical release poster
- Directed by: Florian Zeller
- Screenplay by: Florian Zeller; Christopher Hampton
- Based on: Le Père by Florian Zeller
- Produced by: David Parfitt; Jean-Louis Livi; Philippe Carcassonne; Christophe Spadone; Simon Friend
- Starring: Anthony Hopkins; Olivia Colman; Mark Gatiss; Imogen Poots; Rufus Sewell; Olivia Williams
- Cinematography: Ben Smithard
- Edited by: Yorgos Lamprinos
- Music by: Ludovico Einaudi
- Production companies: F comme Film; Trademark Films; Ciné-@; AG Studios; Les Films du Cru; Film4; Orange Studio; Canal+; Ciné+
- Distributed by: UGC Distribution (France); Lionsgate (United Kingdom)
- Release dates: 27 January 2020 (Sundance); 26 May 2021 (France); 11 June 2021 (United Kingdom)
- Running time: 97 minutes
- Countries: France; United Kingdom
- Language: English
- Budget: $6 million
- Box office: $36 million

The Father is a 2020 psychological drama film, directed by Florian Zeller in his directorial debut. He co-wrote the screenplay with fellow playwright Christopher Hampton on the basis of Zeller's 2012 play Le Père. A French–British co-production, the film stars Anthony Hopkins as an octogenarian man living with dementia. Olivia Colman, Mark Gatiss, Imogen Poots, Rufus Sewell, and Olivia Williams also star.

The Father premiered at the Sundance Film Festival on 27 January 2020. After its wide release was delayed by the COVID-19 pandemic, it was released in France on 26 May 2021 and in the UK on 11 June 2021. The film grossed $36 million worldwide on a $6 million budget and was acclaimed by critics, who lauded the performances of Hopkins and Colman, as well as the production values and the portrayal of dementia. At the 93rd Academy Awards, The Father received six nominations, including Best Picture; Hopkins won Best Actor and Zeller and Hampton won Best Adapted Screenplay. Since then, it has been cited as one of the best films of the 2020s and the 21st century.

== Plot ==
Anne visits her father Anthony in his flat after he has driven away the latest of several carers. He has dementia and constantly forgets important life events and where things are around his flat, including his watch. He tells Anne he believes his carer stole his watch and that he will never move out of his flat. She tells Anthony she is moving to Paris to be with a man, which confuses Anthony since he does not recall any men in her life since the end of her marriage to James. Anne says that if he keeps refusing to have a carer, she will have to move him into a nursing home.

The next day, Anthony encounters an unknown man, Paul, in his flat. Paul says he is Anne's husband and that Anthony is living in their flat. Anne returns but appears to Anthony as a different woman. When a new carer, Laura, arrives for an interview, Anthony tells Laura he was a professional dancer and insists he does not need any assistance. Anthony later says Laura reminds him of his other daughter Lucy, whom he has not seen for a long time.

Anthony is taken to a doctor and rejects the idea that he has memory problems. Later, he tells Laura how proud he is of Lucy, a painter. She tells him she is sorry about Lucy's accident, but Anthony is confused as he has no recollection of the accident. Over the course of the film, it becomes clear that Anthony has really been living with Anne for years, but believes he still lives in his own flat. After Anne comes home, she and her husband – who is sometimes called Paul and sometimes James, and appears as two different men – have an argument over a holiday that had to be cancelled because of Anthony's needs, and about Anne's sacrifices for her father. Paul asks Anthony how long he plans to stay in their flat and annoy everyone; this sequence of events is repeated later, and on the second occasion Paul slaps him.

Anthony wakes up and walks out of the flat, finding himself in a hospital hallway. He remembers Lucy lying in a hospital bed with blood on her face. He then wakes up in a completely different bedroom, which is in a nursing home. His nurse arrives, having earlier appeared as both Anne and Laura, but now identifying herself as Catherine. She informs him that Anne lives in Paris and visits on occasional weekends. Another nurse named Bill also visits, identical to one of the men who earlier appeared to be Anne's husband. Anthony breaks down in tears over his inability to understand what is happening to him, as well as Anne's disappearance. He says he wants his mother and that he is "losing my leaves, the branches, the wind and the rain". Catherine comforts him and tells him she will take him out to the park later.

== Cast ==
- Anthony Hopkins as Anthony
- Olivia Colman as Anne
- Rufus Sewell as Paul / James
- Imogen Poots as Laura
- Olivia Williams as The Woman (Catherine)
- Mark Gatiss as The Man (Bill)
- Ayesha Dharker as Dr Sarai

== Production ==
It was announced in May 2019 that Florian Zeller was to direct a screenplay with Christopher Hampton based on his play. Anthony Hopkins and Olivia Colman were cast in the film. Olivia Williams, Rufus Sewell, Imogen Poots and Mark Gatiss joined later that month, with filming beginning on 13 May 2019. Filming locations included West London Film Studios, and Hayes, Hillingdon.

Production companies included Les Films du Cru, Film4, Orange Studio, StudioCanal, and Ciné+.

== Release ==
The Father had its world premiere at the Sundance Film Festival on 27 January 2020. Prior to, Sony Pictures Classics acquired distribution rights to the film in the United States and select international territories, with Lionsgate distributing in the United Kingdom. It also screened at the Toronto International Film Festival on 14 September 2020, and at the AFI Fest in October 2020.

In the United States, the film began a limited release in New York City and Los Angeles on 26 February 2021, before being available on premium video on demand starting 26 March, after originally being scheduled to be released on 18 December 2020. The film was released in India on 23 April 2021 and in the United Kingdom on 11 June 2021, delayed from earlier release dates of 8 January and 12 March in response to lockdowns as result of a second-wave of the COVID-19 pandemic. The film was released in mainland China on 18 June 2021.

== Reception ==
=== Box office ===
The Father grossed $2.1 million in the United States and Canada, and $34.3 million in other territories, for a worldwide total of $36.4 million. In the film's opening weekend in the United States, the film made $433,611 from 865 cinemas, finishing eighth at the box office. The weekend following its six Oscar nominations, the film made $355,000 from 937 cinemas. Following its two Oscar wins, the film made $147,000 from 713 cinemas, for a running total of $1.9 million. In Spain, the film made $171,901 in its opening weekend from 156 cinemas, then $160,378 in its second and $54,901 in its third.

=== Critical response ===
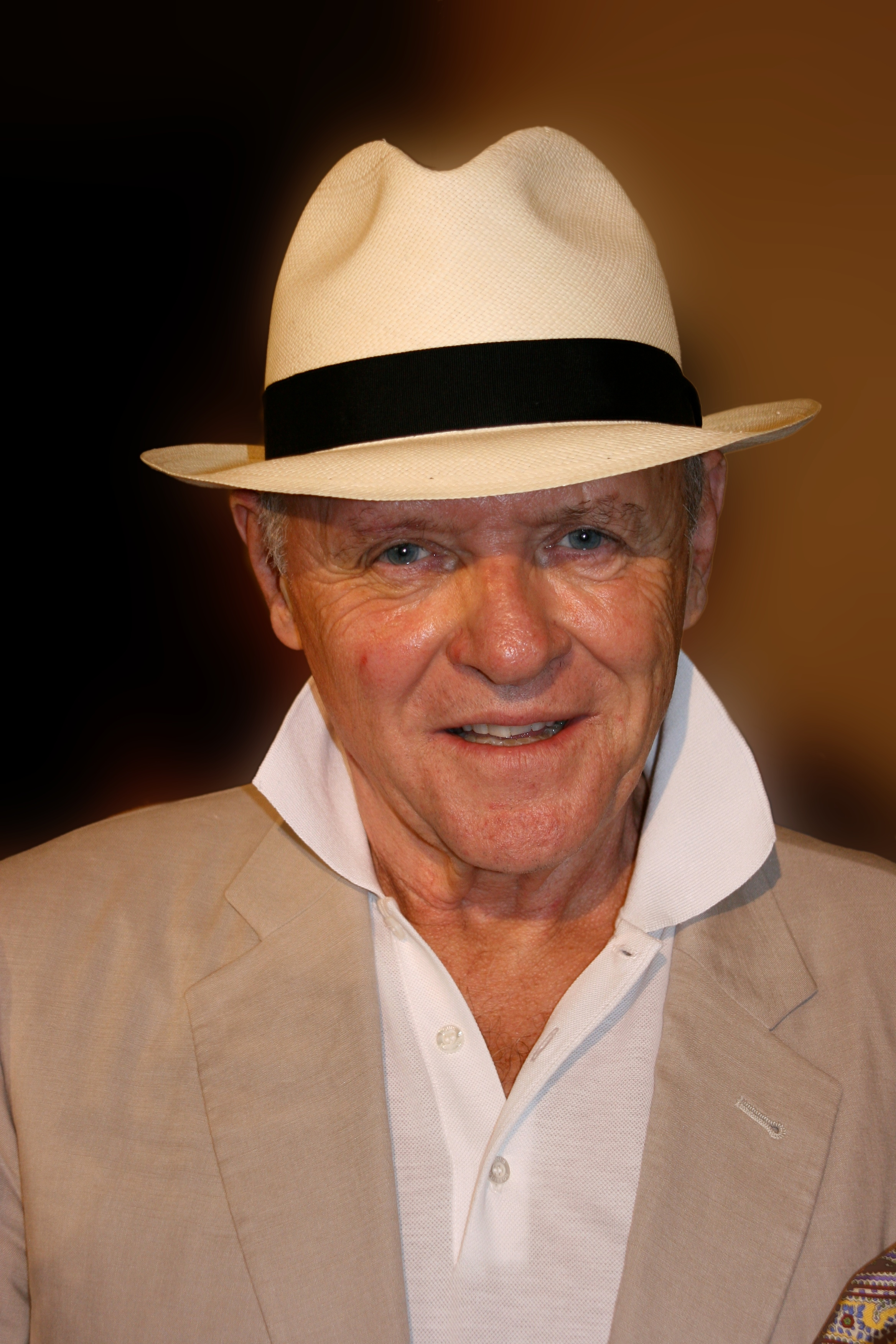
Anthony Hopkins won his second Academy Award for Best Actor for his role as Anthony.

On the review aggregator website Rotten Tomatoes, 98% of 296 critics' reviews are positive, with an average rating of 8.7/10. The website's consensus reads: "Led by stellar performances and artfully helmed by writer-director Florian Zeller, The Father presents a devastatingly empathetic portrayal of dementia." Metacritic, which uses a weighted average, assigned the film a score of 88 out of 100, based on 51 critics, indicating "universal acclaim". According to PostTrak, 84% of audience members gave the film a positive score, with 54% saying they would definitely recommend it.

Anthony Hopkins's performance received widespread critical acclaim, with some calling it the finest of his career. He won his second Academy Award for Best Actor at age 83, making him the oldest Best Actor winner.

Writing for Variety, Owen Gleiberman said "The Father does something that few movies about mental deterioration in old age have brought off in quite this way, or this fully. It places us in the mind of someone losing his mind—and it does so by revealing that mind to be a place of seemingly rational and coherent experience." For The Guardian, Benjamin Lee wrote of Hopkins's performance: "It's astounding, heartbreaking work, watching him try to rationally explain to himself and those around him what he's experiencing. In some of the film's most quietly upsetting moments, his world has shifted yet again but he remains silent, knowing that any attempt to question what he's woken up to will only fall on deaf ears. Hopkins runs the full gamut of emotions from fury to outrage to longing for his mother like a little child and never once does it feel like a constructed character bit, despite our association with him as an actor with a storied career."

Todd McCarthy of The Hollywood Reporter wrote: "The best film about the wages of aging since Amour eight years ago, The Father takes a bracingly insightful, subtle and nuanced look at encroaching dementia and the toll it takes on those in close proximity to the afflicted. Fronted by a stupendous performance from Anthony Hopkins as a proud Englishman [sic] in denial of his condition, this penetrating work marks an outstanding directorial debut by the play's French author Florian Zeller."

Writing for Indiewire, David Ehrlich said: "Zeller adapts his award-winning play of the same name with steely vision and remarkable confidence, as the writer-director makes use of the camera like he's been standing behind one for his entire life. ... In Zeller's hands, what appears to be a conventional-seeming portrait of an unmoored old man as he rages against his daughter and caretaker slowly reveals itself to be the brilliant study of a mind at sea, and of the indescribable pain of watching someone drown."

Writing for The New York Times, Jeannette Catsoulis said The Father is "stupendously effective and profoundly upsetting" and described it as a "majestic depiction of things falling away". The Guardian's Anne Billson ranked Hopkins's performance in the film as the best of his career.

It is, according to The Times, "one of the greatest cinematic experiences of the decade".

=== Legacy ===
In 2022, Time Out ranked it number 93 on its list of the "100 Best Films of the 21st Century So Far", writing that the film "communicates perfectly what dementia must feel like: a world stripped of its signposts, a feeling of being uncoupled, a sense of the familiar slowly becoming frighteningly 'other'." In 2023, it ranked number 2 on Collider's list of "The 20 Best Drama Movies of the 2020s So Far," saying that Zeller "proved that the best way to show how debilitating memory loss is, was to show it through the eyes of the victim itself," using "creative techniques to show the shifts in reality." It also ranked number 27 on its list of the "30 Best Drama Movies of All Time," saying "While it's not the first movie to explore the difficulties of living with dementia, few others have done so quite as powerfully as The Father. It very quickly establishes itself as an intensely psychological drama, putting viewers in the mind of its main character and showing the ways he's frequently disorientated, confused, and untrusting of people he doesn't always recognize." In 2024, Looper ranked it number 42 on its list of the "50 Best PG-13 Movies of All Time," writing "Countless mainstream horror movies could take a cue from The Father in terms of how to chill audiences to the bone ... Consistently eerie and uncertain, The Father is also laced with deep empathy for its protagonist, a trait punctuated by a towering, heartbreaking performance from Hopkins."

=== Selections ===
- Sundance Film Festival: official selection
- Toronto International Film Festival: official selection
- Telluride Film Festival: official selection
- San Sebastián International Film Festival: Pearls section
- Zurich Film Festival: official selection
- Hamptons International Film Festival: official selection
- Dinard British Film Festival

=== Accolades ===
Award	Category	Recipient	Result	Ref.
AACTA International Awards (10th)	Best International Actor	Anthony Hopkins	Nominated	
AACTA International Awards (10th)	Best International Supporting Actress	Olivia Colman	Won	
AACTA International Awards (10th)	Best International Screenplay	Florian Zeller and Christopher Hampton	Nominated	
AACTA International Awards (10th)	Best International Film	Florian Zeller	Nominated	
AARP's Movies for Grownups Awards	Best Actor	Anthony Hopkins	Won	
Academy Awards	Best Picture	David Parfitt, Jean-Louis Livi and Philippe Carcassonne	Nominated	
Academy Awards	Best Actor	Anthony Hopkins	Won	
Academy Awards	Best Supporting Actress	Olivia Colman	Nominated	
Academy Awards	Best Adapted Screenplay	Florian Zeller and Christopher Hampton	Won	
Academy Awards	Best Film Editing	Yorgos Lamprinos	Nominated	
Academy Awards	Best Production Design	Peter Francis and Cathy Featherstone	Nominated	
Austin Film Critics Association Awards	Best Actor	Anthony Hopkins	Nominated	
Austin Film Critics Association Awards	Best Supporting Actress	Olivia Colman	Nominated	
Austin Film Critics Association Awards	Best Screenplay	Florian Zeller and Christopher Hampton	Nominated	
Austin Film Critics Association Awards	Best Editing	Yorgos Lamprinos	Nominated	
British Academy Film Awards	Best Film	Philippe Carcassonne, Jean-Louis Livi and David Parfitt	Nominated	
British Academy Film Awards	Best British Film	Florian Zeller, Philippe Carcassonne, Jean-Louis Livi, David Parfitt and Christopher Hampton	Nominated	
British Academy Film Awards	Best Actor in a Leading Role	Anthony Hopkins	Won	
British Academy Film Awards	Best Adapted Screenplay	Florian Zeller and Christopher Hampton	Won	
British Academy Film Awards	Best Editing	Yorgos Lamprinos	Nominated	
British Academy Film Awards	Best Production Design	Peter Francis	Nominated	
British Independent Film Awards	Best Independent British Film		Nominated	
British Independent Film Awards	Best Director	Florian Zeller	Nominated	
British Independent Film Awards	Best Actor	Anthony Hopkins	Won	
British Independent Film Awards	Best Screenplay	Florian Zeller and Christopher Hampton	Won	
British Independent Film Awards	Best Editing	Yorgos Lamprinos	Won	
British Independent Film Awards	Best Production Design	Peter Francis	Nominated	
Boston Society of Film Critics Awards	Best New Filmmaker	Florian Zeller	Won	
Boston Society of Film Critics Awards	Best Actor	Anthony Hopkins	Won	
César Awards	César Award for Best Foreign Film		Won	
Cinéfest Sudbury International Film Festival	Audience Choice Award		Won	
Chicago Film Critics Association Awards	Best Actor	Anthony Hopkins	Nominated	
Chicago Film Critics Association Awards	Best Screenplay	Florian Zeller and Christopher Hampton	Nominated	
Critics' Choice Movie Awards	Best Actor	Anthony Hopkins	Nominated	
Critics' Choice Movie Awards	Best Supporting Actress	Olivia Colman	Nominated	
Critics' Choice Movie Awards	Best Adapted Screenplay	Florian Zeller and Christopher Hampton	Nominated	
Critics' Choice Movie Awards	Best Editing	Yorgos Lamprinos	Nominated	
Directors Guild of America Awards	Outstanding Directorial – First-Time Feature Film	Florian Zeller	Nominated	
European Film Awards	Best Film	The Father	Nominated	
European Film Awards	Best Director	Florian Zeller	Nominated	
European Film Awards	Best Screenwriter	Florian Zeller and Christopher Hampton	Won	
European Film Awards	Best Actor	Anthony Hopkins	Won	
Florida Film Critics Circle Awards	Best Director	Florian Zeller	Nominated	
Florida Film Critics Circle Awards	Best First Film	Florian Zeller	Nominated	
Florida Film Critics Circle Awards	Best Actor	Anthony Hopkins	Won	
Florida Film Critics Circle Awards	Best Adapted Screenplay	Florian Zeller and Christopher Hampton	Nominated	
Georgia Film Critics Association Awards	Best Film		Nominated	
Georgia Film Critics Association Awards	Best Actor	Anthony Hopkins	Nominated	
Georgia Film Critics Association Awards	Best Supporting Actress	Olivia Colman	Nominated	
Georgia Film Critics Association Awards	Best Screenplay	Florian Zeller and Christopher Hampton	Nominated	
Golden Globe Awards	Best Motion Picture – Drama		Nominated	
Golden Globe Awards	Best Actor – Motion Picture Drama	Anthony Hopkins	Nominated	
Golden Globe Awards	Best Supporting Actress – Motion Picture	Olivia Colman	Nominated	
Golden Globe Awards	Best Screenplay	Florian Zeller and Christopher Hampton	Nominated	
Goya Awards (Spain)	Best European Film	Florian Zeller	Won	
Grande Prêmio do Cinema Brasileiro (Brazil)	Best International Film		Nominated	
Hollywood Critics Association Awards	Best Film		Nominated	
Hollywood Critics Association Awards	Best Actor	Anthony Hopkins	Nominated	
Hollywood Critics Association Awards	Best Supporting Actress	Olivia Colman	Nominated	
Hollywood Critics Association Awards	Best Screenplay	Florian Zeller and Christopher Hampton	Nominated	
Hollywood Critics Association Awards	Best Editing	Yorgos Lamprinos	Nominated	
Houston Film Critics Society Awards	Best Picture		Nominated	
Houston Film Critics Society Awards	Best Actor	Anthony Hopkins	Nominated	
Houston Film Critics Society Awards	Best Supporting Actress	Olivia Colman	Nominated	
Los Angeles Film Critics Association Awards	Best Editing	Yorgos Lamprinos	Won	
London Critics Circle Film Awards	Best British Film		Nominated	
London Critics Circle Film Awards	Best Actor	Anthony Hopkins	Nominated	
London Critics Circle Film Awards	Best British Actor	Anthony Hopkins	Nominated	
Premios CEC (Spain)	Best Foreign Film	Florian Zeller	Nominated	
San Diego Film Critics Society Awards	Best Director	Florian Zeller	Nominated	
San Diego Film Critics Society Awards	Best Actor	Anthony Hopkins	Nominated	
San Diego Film Critics Society Awards	Best Screenplay	Florian Zeller and Christopher Hampton	Won	
San Francisco Film Critics Circle Awards	Best Actor	Anthony Hopkins	Nominated	
San Francisco Film Critics Circle Awards	Best Supporting Actress	Olivia Colman	Nominated	
San Francisco Film Critics Circle Awards	Best Editing	Yorgos Lamprinos	Nominated	
San Sebastián International Film Festival	Audience Award		Won	
Screen Actors Guild Awards	Outstanding Actor in a Leading Role	Anthony Hopkins	Nominated	
Screen Actors Guild Awards	Outstanding Supporting Actress	Olivia Colman	Nominated	
Satellite Awards	Best Film		Nominated	
Satellite Awards	Best Director	Florian Zeller	Nominated	
Satellite Awards	Best Actor in a Motion Picture (Drama)	Anthony Hopkins	Nominated	
Satellite Awards	Best Supporting Actress in a Motion Picture	Olivia Colman	Nominated	
Satellite Awards	Best Adapted Screenplay	Florian Zeller and Christopher Hampton	Won	
Satellite Awards	Best Editing	Yorgos Lamprinos	Nominated	
Telluride Film Festival	Silver Medallion Award	Anthony Hopkins	Won	
Toronto International Film Festival	Tribute Award	Anthony Hopkins	Won	
Toronto International Film Festival	Audience Award		Nominated	
Zurich Film Festival	Golden Eyes Award	Olivia Colman	Won	
Golden Rooster Awards (China)	Best International Film		Won	

== Related film ==
The Son (2022) based on Zeller's 2018 play, is in-part framed as a prequel to The Father, with Hopkins briefly appearing as "Anthony" in a cameo and Zeller returning as writer and director.
