= David Ehrlich =

American film critic and journalist (born 1984)

- Born: October 19, 1984 (age 42); Brooklyn, New York City
- Education: Columbia University
- Occupations: Film critic; journalist
- Years active: 2011–present
- Children: 2

David Ehrlich (born October 19, 1984) is an American film critic and journalist. Ehrlich became the chief film critic of IndieWire in 2021.

== Career ==
Ehrlich completed a Bachelor's degree in Film Studies at Columbia University. Since then he has worked as a journalist for a variety of different magazines including Rolling Stone, Time Out New York and Little White Lies. As a freelance contributor, Ehrlich has worked for Slate, Vanity Fair, The Guardian, The Independent and The Dissolve. Ehrlich is also known to post his reviews on his Letterboxd account which is one of the most followed on the platform. As of November 2026, Ehrlich has over 220,000 followers. He is currently writing a book about the history of A24, which is scheduled to be released sometime in 2027.

In 2022, Ehrlich won Film Critic of the Year at the National Arts and Entertainment Journalism Awards.

=== Best films of the year ===
Since 2011, Ehrlich has compiled an annual list of his 25 best films of the year. His number one films are as follows:

- 2011: This Is Not a Film
- 2012: Holy Motors
- 2013: Before Midnight
- 2014: The Grand Budapest Hotel
- 2015: Carol
- 2016: Moonlight
- 2017: Call Me by Your Name
- 2018: First Reformed
- 2019: Portrait of a Lady on Fire
- 2020: Time
- 2021: The Power of the Dog
- 2022: Aftersun
- 2023: The Boy and the Heron
- 2024: Nickel Boys
- 2025: One Battle After Another

== Personal life ==
Ehrlich lives in Brooklyn with his wife and two children. He is an anti-Zionist Jew.
