= Paul Van Carter =

British film producer, novelist, and music producer

Paul Van Carter (born 15 November 1976) is a British film producer, novelist, and music producer. As a producer, his most recent films include the double BAFTA nominated McQueen about the life of fashion designer Alexander McQueen distributed by Lionsgate and Bleecker Street which premiered at the Tribeca Film Festival in 2018; the Winston Churchill biopic Churchill set in the hours preceding D-Day 1944 which stars Brian Cox, Miranda Richardson, and John Slattery; the biopic of bare-knuckle boxer Lenny McLean entitled My Name is Lenny which stars Josh Helman, Michael Bisping, and was the last film of actor Sir John Hurt; and the documentary about footballer Paul Gascoigne's life Gascoigne. As a screenwriter his credits include the prison drama Offender, the action film Shank, and the documentary The Guv'nor, which he also directed. As novelist his history of twentieth century painting Oil on Canvas, was published in 2011.

He is the co-founder of the London-based film finance and production company Salon Pictures, whose other slated releases include two films directed by Rob Ryan entitled Breaking Habits, and The Billion Dollar Game, the Thomas Meadmore documentary The Spy Who Fell to Earth, and the retrospective of designer Frank Stephenson's life and work, Chasing Perfect. Salon was listed on the Brit50 in Screen International 2018.

He was raised in Letchworth Garden City and is married to Kristina Van Carter.

== Filmography ==
- 2019: Stardust
- 2019: Chasing Perfect
- 2019: The Spy Who Fell to Earth
- 2018: McQueen
- 2018: Fred
- 2018: Breaking Habits
- 2017: Surrender: the Art of Jan Fabre
- 2017: Churchill
- 2017: My Name is Lenny
- 2017: Shemira (short)
- 2017: Lek & The Dogs
- 2016: The Iconoclast
- 2016: The Guv'nor
- 2015: The Challenge
- 2015: Gascoigne
- 2012: Offender
- 2011: Anuvahood
- 2011: Sket
- 2010: Shank
- 2009: In The Blackout (short)
- 2000: Shelf Life

== Discography ==
Singles & EPs

- Your Girl Likes Alphabet Street - EP (2019)
- Siked Up (2019)
- We Want House (2018)
- Say Hello EP (2018)
- Romantic EP (2018)

== Bibliography ==
Novels

- Prelude and Fugue (2005)
- Oil on Canvas (2004)
