= The Son (2022 film) =

Film directed by Florian Zeller

- Theatrical release poster
- Directed by: Florian Zeller
- Screenplay by: Florian Zeller; Christopher Hampton
- Based on: Le Fils by Florian Zeller
- Produced by: Joanna Laurie; Iain Canning; Emile Sherman; Florian Zeller; Christophe Spadone
- Starring: Hugh Jackman; Laura Dern; Vanessa Kirby; Zen McGrath; Anthony Hopkins
- Cinematography: Ben Smithard
- Edited by: Yorgos Lamprinos
- Music by: Hans Zimmer
- Production companies: Film4; Ingenious Media; Cross City Films; Embankment Films; See-Saw Films; Inthevoid Production
- Distributed by: Sony Pictures Classics (United States); UGC Distribution (France); STX Films and Black Bear Pictures (United Kingdom)
- Release dates: 7 September 2022 (Venice); 20 January 2023 (United States); 17 February 2023 (United Kingdom); 1 March 2023 (France)
- Running time: 123 minutes
- Countries: France; United Kingdom; United States
- Language: English
- Budget: $6 million
- Box office: $3.6 million

The Son is a 2022 drama film directed by Florian Zeller from a screenplay written by Zeller and Christopher Hampton. It is based on Zeller's 2018 stage play. The film stars Hugh Jackman, Laura Dern, Vanessa Kirby, Zen McGrath, Hugh Quarshie, and Anthony Hopkins.

The Son had its world premiere at the 79th Venice International Film Festival on 7 September 2022, and was released for a one-week limited theatrical release in New York City and Los Angeles on 25 November 2022, before a wide release in the United States on 20 January 2023 by Sony Pictures Classics. The film received mixed reviews from critics, though Jackman's performance received praise. At the 80th Golden Globe Awards and 27th Satellite Awards, Jackman was nominated for Best Actor.

== Plot ==
Peter Miller is recently married to his second wife, Beth, and is raising their newborn son Theo. His ex-wife, Kate, unexpectedly shows up and says their 17-year-old son, Nicholas, is depressed and has dropped out of school.

Although Peter barely knows Nicholas, he agrees to house him. Peter also has a terrible relationship with his own father, Anthony, who was cruel and often absent from Peter's life. However, Peter has moved on from his childhood trauma and hopes to be a good father to Nicholas.

Despite trying to bond with Nicholas, Peter refuses to acknowledge that he has deeply wounded him by cheating on Kate. When Nicholas attempts suicide and is placed in an in-patient treatment facility, Peter belatedly grasps his responsibility for the situation.

A week later, Peter and Kate bring Nicholas home after feeling sympathetic to his pleas that he regrets the decisions that led to the facility. Once back home, Nicholas makes tea for his parents and happily talks about seeing a movie as a family. As he leaves to shower and his parents discuss how things seem better, Nicholas fatally shoots himself. Three years later, a guilt-ridden Peter fantasises about what Nicholas' life could have been like if he had lived. Blaming himself for Nicholas’ death, Peter breaks down emotionally as Beth comforts him.

== Cast ==
- Hugh Jackman as Peter Miller
- Laura Dern as Kate Miller, Peter’s ex-wife
- Vanessa Kirby as Beth, Peter's second wife
- Zen McGrath as Nicholas Miller, Peter's estranged son who is struggling with depression.
  - George Cobell as young Nicholas Miller
- Hugh Quarshie as Dr. Harris, Nicholas' therapist
- Anthony Hopkins as Anthony Miller, Peter's father and Nicholas' grandfather.
- Gretchen Egolf as ER Psychiatrist

== Production ==
During an interview via Zoom after the 93rd Academy Awards nominations were announced, director/writer Florian Zeller revealed to Deadline Hollywood that he was finishing up an adaptation of one of his plays titled The Son. In April 2021, Hugh Jackman and Laura Dern were cast to star in the film. In June 2021, Vanessa Kirby joined the cast of the film.

Principal photography began in August 2021. As of October 2021, production had concluded. It was reported Anthony Hopkins and Zen McGrath had also joined the cast, the former of whom is reuniting with Zeller after working on The Father (2020), for which he won the Academy Award for Best Actor.

== Release ==
In July 2021, Sony Pictures Classics acquired distribution rights to the film for the United States, Southeast Asia, China, India, Eastern Europe and Turkey. STX Entertainment claimed the distribution rights for the United Kingdom, the Benelux, Italy, Scandinavia and Iceland that same month. Despite STX's main international office in London shutting down, the company managed to release the film in the aforementioned territories, with Black Bear Pictures co-distributing the film in the UK.

The film had its world premiere in competition at the 79th Venice International Film Festival on 7 September 2022. Its North American premiere took place at the Toronto International Film Festival that same month on 12 September 2022. It also screened at the 2022 AFI Fest on 5 November 2022. The film was initially scheduled for a limited release in the United States on 11 November 2022, with expansions in the following weeks, before its limited release was shifted to 25 November. Its US limited release was later shifted again to a one-week engagement from 25 November, only in limited New York City and Los Angeles theaters, before a nationwide release on 20 January 2023. Although initially planned for 8 March 2023, the film was released in France on 1 March 2023.

== Reception ==
On Rotten Tomatoes, the film holds an approval rating of 28%, based on 183 reviews with an average rating of 4.9/10. The website's consensus reads: "Despite reliably solid work from Laura Dern and Hugh Jackman, The Son remains mired in off-puttingly aggressive melodrama." Metacritic assigned the film a weighted average score of 45 out of 100, based on 46 critics, indicating "mixed or average reviews".

=== Accolades ===
| Award | Date of ceremony | Category | Recipient | Result | Ref. |
|---|---|---|---|---|---|
| AACTA International Awards | 24 February 2023 | Best Lead Actor | Hugh Jackman | Nominated | |
| Golden Globe Awards | 10 January 2023 | Best Actor in a Motion Picture – Drama | Hugh Jackman | Nominated | |
| Satellite Awards | 3 March 2023 | Best Actor in a Motion Picture – Drama | Hugh Jackman | Nominated | |
| Venice International Film Festival | 31 August–10 September 2022 | Golden Lion | Florian Zeller | Nominated | |
