= Le Père =

Play written by Florian Zeller

- Original language: French
- Written by: Florian Zeller
- Characters: André (The father); Anne (daughter); Pierre; Laura; Man; Woman
- Setting: A flat in Paris, 2010s

Premiere
- Date: 20 September 2012
- Place: Théâtre Hébertot, Paris

Le Père (The Father) is a play by the French playwright/filmmaker Florian Zeller that won in 2014 the Molière Award for Best Play. It premiered in September 2012 at the Théâtre Hébertot, Paris, with Robert Hirsch (André) and Isabelle Gélinas (Anne).

The play was considered as "one of the best plays of the century" by The Times and won several awards and nominations in Paris, London, Tokyo or New York. The play was translated into English by Christopher Hampton.

It was adapted to make the French film Floride (2015). Zeller directed and co-wrote with Hampton the 2020 English-language film adaptation, starring Anthony Hopkins and Olivia Colman. It won the Academy Awards for Best Adapted Screenplay and Best Actor (Hopkins).

== Plot ==
André, a once proud old man, is showing the first signs of mental degeneration. His daughter Anne, who takes him in at her apartment where the play takes place, seeks only to help and protect him, but the progression of his illness becomes inexorable. Both angry and distraught, he gradually loses his mind and reverts to childhood under her clouded gaze.

Through stagecraft, the production draws the viewer into the twists and turns of a diseased mind: the actors' roles swap and become interchangeable, furniture changes from one scene to the next, and the dialogue repeats itself. The viewer is brought inside the father's head, hence the misunderstandings and the feeling of constantly being caught between truth and fiction, nightmare and reality. As the father decays, the setting expands and the space empties, leaving him with his solitude, his own nothingness and his impending end.

== Productions ==
The play gained widespread critical acclaim when it received its UK premiere as The Father at the Ustinov Studio of the Theatre Royal, Bath, in 2014. The role of the father was played by Kenneth Cranham. The play ran in the West End at Wyndham's Theatre in October 2015 to November 2015, and returned to the West End at the Duke of York's Theatre from 24 February 2016 to 26 March 2016, with Kenneth Cranham.

Its American premiere took place on Broadway in a Manhattan Theatre Club production at the Samuel J. Friedman Theatre in 2016 with Frank Langella in the title role. It was directed by Doug Hughes with scenic design by Scott Pask, costumes by Catherine Zuber and lighting by Donald Holder. The cast featured Kathryn Erbe (Anne), Brian Avers (Pierre), Charles Borland (Man), Hannah Cabell (Laura), and Kathleen McNenny (Woman).

The Los Angeles premiere was produced in 2020 by the Pasadena Playhouse, starring Alfred Molina, under the direction of Jessica Kubzansky.

The Australian premiere was produced by the Sydney Theatre Company, with performances starting in August 2017 at the Wharf Theatre, and starring John Bell in the title role.

The Singapore premiere was produced by Pangdemonium Theatre Company and played at the Victoria Theatre from 2 to 18 March 2018, starring Lim Kay Siu in the title role. It starred Tan Kheng Hua, Janice Koh, Adrian Pang, Frances Lee and Keagan Kang.

The play has been staged in more than 45 countries.

== Response ==
According to Playbill, "the London newspaper The Guardian gave the London production a rare five-star review, calling it 'a savagely honest study of dementia,' and named it best play of the year".

According to The Times, The Father is "one of the best plays of the century".

== Awards and nominations ==
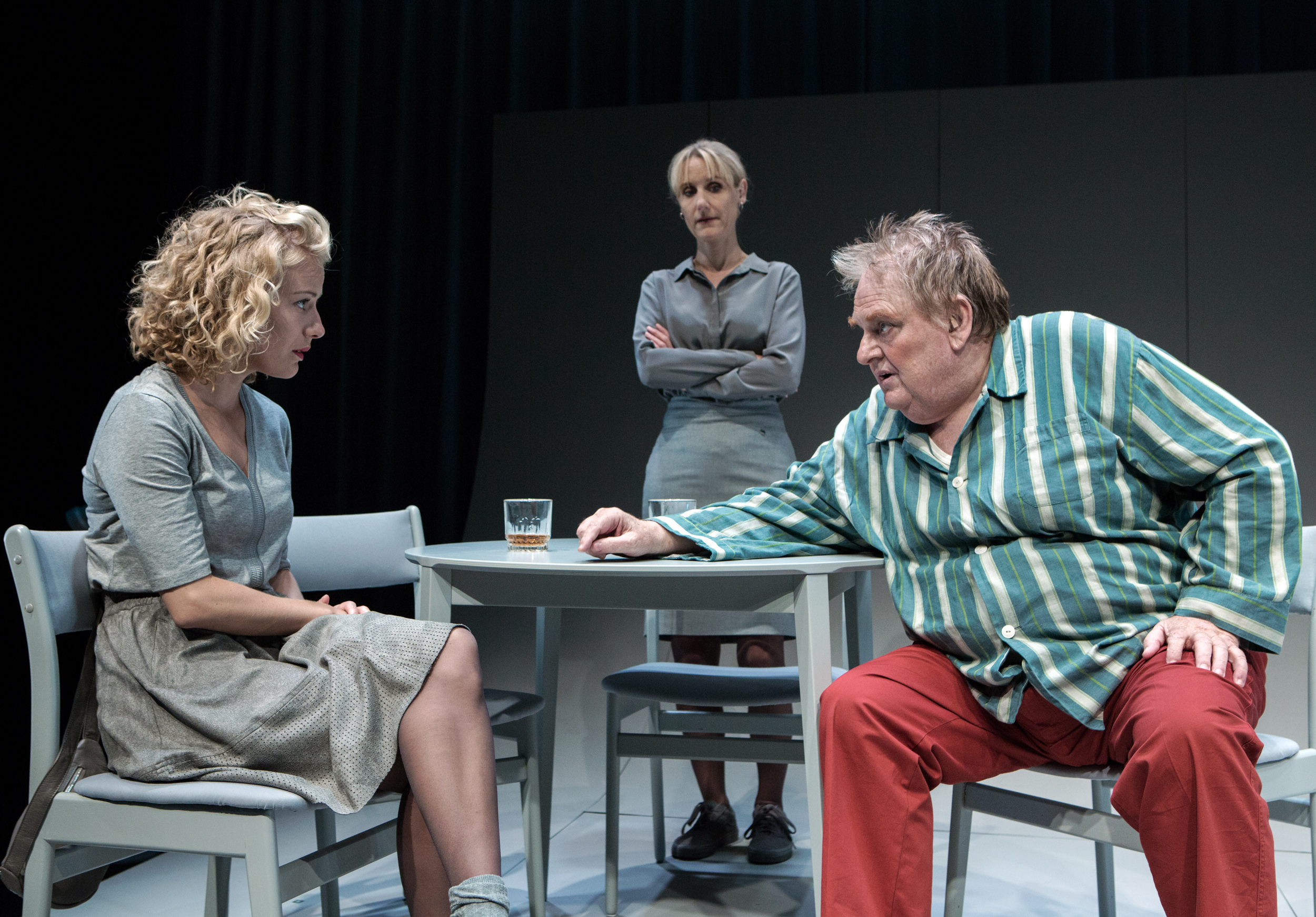
Kristine Yde Eriksen, Anette Støvelbæk, Ole Thestrup, Folketeatret, Copenhagen (2016)

Awards

- 2014 Molière Award for Best Play
- 2014 Molière Award for Best Actor in a Private Theatre – Robert Hirsch
- 2014 Molière Award for Best Actress in a Private Theatre – Isabelle Gélinas
- 2015 Critics' Circle Theatre Award for Best Actor – Kenneth Cranham
- 2016 Laurence Olivier Award for Best Actor – Kenneth Cranham
- 2016 Outer Critics Circle Award for Outstanding Actor in a Play – Frank Langella
- 2016 Tony Award for Best Actor in a Play – Frank Langella
- 2017 Irish Times Theatre Award for Best Actor – Owen Roe
- 2017 Shell Award for Best Actor – Fúlvio Stefanini
- 2017 Fleur du Cap Theatre Award for Best Actor – Marius Weyers
- 2020 Yomiuri Prize for Best Actor

Nominations

- 2015 Theatre Awards UK for Best New Play
- 2015 Evening Standard Theatre Award for Best Play
- 2015 Evening Standard Theatre Award for Best Actor – Kenneth Cranham
- 2016 Laurence Olivier Award for Best New Play
- 2016 Outer Critics Circle Award for Outstanding New Broadway Play
- 2016 Drama League Award for Outstanding Production of a Play
- 2016 Tony Award for Best Play
- 2017 Irish Times Theatre Award for Best Production
- 2020 Yomiuri Prize for Best Play
- 2020 Yomiuri Prize for Best Actress
