= Florian Zeller =

French playwright, novelist, theatre director, and filmmaker (born 1979)

- Zeller in 2026
- Born: June 28, 1979 (age 47); Paris, France
- Occupations: Playwright, novelist, theatre director, filmmaker
- Spouse: Marine Delterme (m. 2010)
- Children: 2
- Writing career
- Years active: 2002–present
- Genre: Literary fiction

Florian Zeller (French: [zɛlɛʁ]; born 28 June 1979) is a French playwright, novelist, theatre director, filmmaker and film producer. He has written over a dozen plays that have been staged worldwide, making him one of the most celebrated contemporary playwrights. He has received various accolades including an Academy Award, a BAFTA Award and a César Award as well as nominations for a Golden Globe Award, two Golden Lions, two Laurence Olivier Awards, and a Tony Award. Zeller was awarded France's Legion of Honour in 2023.

As a playwright, Zeller is most known for his family trilogy, which consists of The Mother (2010), The Father (2012) and The Son (2018), the middle of which debuted on Broadway in 2016 on both the West End and Broadway stage earning nominations for the Laurence Olivier Award for Best New Play and the Tony Award for Best Play respectively. He has also written the plays, The Truth (2017) and The Height of the Storm (2019).

Zeller directed and co-wrote the 2020 film adaptation of his play The Father, earning the Academy Award and BAFTA Award for his screenplay. Since then, it has been cited as one of the best films of the 2020s and the 21st century. He has since written, directed, and producted the films The Son (2022) and Bunker (2026), both of which premiered at the Venice International Film Festival.

== Early years and education ==
Florian Zeller was born in Paris in 1979, the middle child of three. His grandmother and mother raised him, as his father worked and lived in Germany. A coma caused by a serious asthma attack at the age of 15 changed the course of his life, as he said later: "I think it's at that moment that worry and writing entered my life." He graduated from Sciences Po in 2001.

== Career ==
=== 2000–2009: Debut novel and early works ===
Zeller wrote his first novel, Artificial Snow, when he was 22. His third novel, The Fascination of Evil, made him a household name in France. It was selected for the Prix Goncourt.

=== 2010–2019: Breakthrough with the family trilogy ===
Zeller's play, The Father, (2014) played in London's West End to critical acclaim and top listings in the Best Plays of the Year. It was considered "the most acclaimed new play of the last decade." and won several awards and nominations in Paris, London and New York. According to The Times, The Father is "one of the greatest plays of the century."

His comedy, The Truth, opened in the West End in June 2017 and received an Olivier Award nomination for Best Comedy. His play, The Height of the Storm, starring Jonathan Pryce and Eileen Atkins, opened in London's West End in September 2018 and on New York's Broadway in September 2019. It has been named "best play of 2018" and "one of the best plays of the 21st century" by The Guardian.

His play, The Mother, starring Isabelle Huppert, opened in New York in February 2019. The Son opened in London in February 2019 and transferred to the West End in September 2019 with rave reviews. His plays have been staged in more than 45 countries.

=== 2020–present: Transition to film directing ===
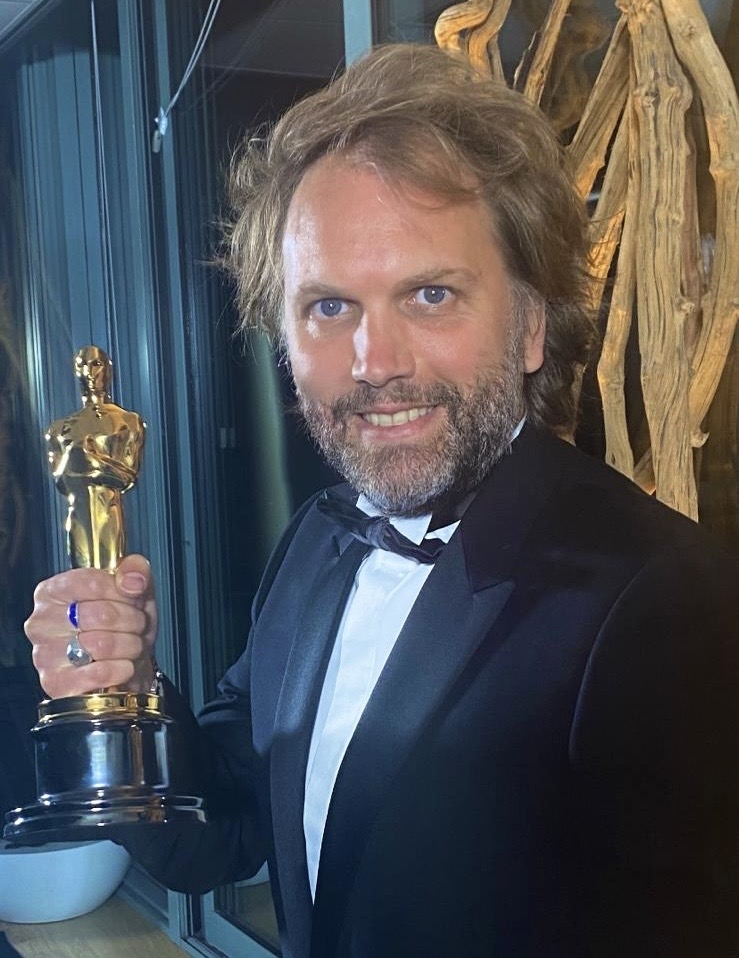
Zeller at the 91st Academy Awards

Zeller wrote and directed his first film, 2020's The Father, based on his play. It had its world premiere at the Sundance Film Festival on 27 January 2020. The film received acclaim from critics, who lauded Hopkins and Colman's performances and praised its depiction of dementia. On review aggregator Rotten Tomatoes, the film holds an approval rating of 98% based on 165 reviews, with an average rating of 8.50/10. The website's critics consensus reads: "Led by stellar performances and artfully helmed by writer-director Florian Zeller, The Father presents a devastatingly empathetic portrayal of dementia." At Metacritic, it has a weighted average score of 88 out of 100, based on 42 critics, indicating "universal acclaim".

The film received four nominations at the 78th Golden Globe Awards, including Best Motion Picture – Drama. It also received six nominations at the 74th British Academy Film Awards, including Best Film, and six Oscar nominations. Zeller and Christopher Hampton won a BAFTA and an Academy Award for Best Adapted Screenplay for the film. It is, according to The Times, "one of the greatest cinematic experiences of the decade". In 2021, it was included on Forbes's list of "The Top 150 Greatest Films Of The 21st Century." In 2022, Time Out ranked it number 93 on its list of the "100 Best Films of the 21st Century So Far", writing that the film "communicates perfectly what dementia must feel like: a world stripped of its signposts, a feeling of being uncoupled, a sense of the familiar slowly becoming frighteningly 'other'." In 2023, it ranked number 2 on Collider's list of "The 20 Best Drama Movies of the 2020s So Far." It also ranked number 27 on its list of the "30 Best Drama Movies of All Time",

In March and April 2021, it was announced that Zeller co-wrote with Christopher Hampton, and would direct, their adaptation of The Son (which serves as Zeller's and Hampton's follow-up to The Father), with Hugh Jackman, Laura Dern and Vanessa Kirby to star in the film. The film premiered in September 2022 at the Venice Film Festival, eliciting a 10-minute standing ovation after the screening.

In May 2025, it was announced that Penelope Cruz and Javier Bardem will star in his upcoming feature, called Bunker. According to Deadline, this psychological thriller "delves into the emotional and moral challenges a couple faces amid the tensions of the world around them, exploring the fears, doubts, and dilemmas that define our era". Filming started in Madrid in December 2025 and wrapped in London in February 2026. Bunker will premiere in September 2026 at the Venice Film Festival, in official competition.

== Personal life ==
Zeller lives in Paris. In 2010, he married ex-model, actress and sculptor Marine Delterme, who played one of the main roles in the Parisian production of his play Le Manège. Their son was born in December 2008. His stepson was born in 1998 to his wife and her previous partner, Jean-Philippe Écoffey. In 2025, he joined the prestigious French literary society Académie Française. (Note: This is the anglicized version of the name, with a capital "F". In French, it is generally written with a lowercase "f".)

== Works ==
=== Film ===
Year	Title	Director	Writer	Producer
2020	The Father	Yes	Yes	No
2022	The Son	Yes	Yes	Yes
2026	Bunker	Yes	Yes	Yes

=== Plays ===
- 2004: L'Autre
- 2005: Le Manège
- 2006: Si tu mourais
- 2008: Elle t'attend
- 2010: The Mother (2015 in London, 2019 in New York)
- 2011: The Truth (2017 in London)
- 2012: Le Père (The Father) (2014 in London, 2016 in New York, adapted into the 2020 film The Father)
- 2013: Une heure de tranquillité (adapted into the 2014 film Do Not Disturb)
- 2014: The Lie (2017 in London)
- 2016: L'Envers du décor (adapted into the 2018 film The Other Woman)
- 2016: The Height of the Storm (2018 in London, 2019 in New York)
- 2018: Le Fils (The Son) (2019 in London, adapted into the 2022 film The Son)
- 2021: The Forest (2021 in London)

=== Novels ===
- 2002: Artificial Snow
- 2003: Lovers or Something Like It
- 2004: The Fascination of Evil
- 2006: Julien Parme
- 2012: La Jouissance

== See also ==
- List of Academy Award winners and nominees from France
