= List of awards and nominations received by Jamie Dornan =

Jamie Dornan awards and nominations
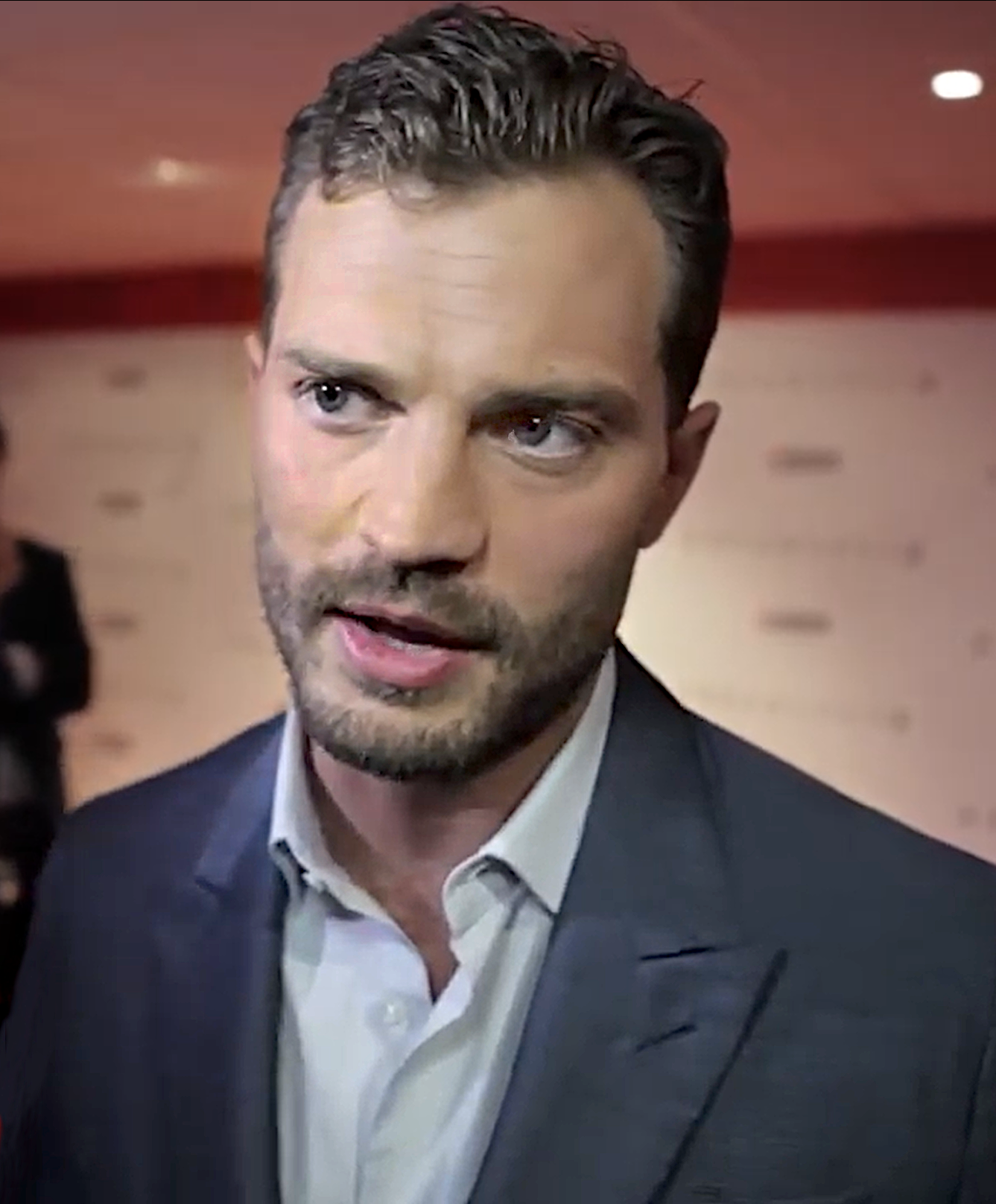
- Dornan at the Dublin International Film Festival
Awards and nominations
Award	Wins	Nominations
AACTA Awards	0	2
British Academy Television Awards	0	1
Czech Lion Awards	0	1
Golden Globe Awards	0	1
Irish Film and Television Awards	2	5
Screen Actors Guild Awards	0	1

Totals (Note: Certain award groups do not simply award one winner. They acknowledge several different recipients, have runners-up, and have third place. Since this is a specific recognition and is different from losing an award, runner-up mentions are considered wins in this award tally. For simplification and to avoid errors, each award in this list has been presumed to have had a prior nomination.)
- Wins: 19
- Nominations: 52

The following is a list of awards and nominations received by actor, model and musician Jamie Dornan. After playing minor roles in various films, Dornan had his first major role in BBC crime drama The Fall (2013–2016). There playing a serial killer, he won the Irish Film and Television Award and was nominated for a British Academy Television Award for Best Actor. His performance as Czech soldier Jan Kubiš in Anthropoid (2016), garnered nominations for the British Independent Film Award and Czech Lion Award for Best Supporting Actor.

His critically panned performance in Fifty Shades of Grey (2015) led him to winning two Golden Raspberry Awards. But he earned a People's Choice Award for his performance in Fifty Shades Freed (2018).

Dornan's portrayal of a working class father in Kenneth Branagh's semi-biographical drama film Belfast (2021), earned him nominations for the Golden Globe Award and Critics' Choice Movie Award for Best Supporting Actor. For his lead performance as an amnesiac in The Tourist (2022–2024), he was nominated for an AACTA Award for Best Lead Actor in a Television Drama.

He was honoured with the Oscar Wilde Award by the US-Ireland Alliance in 2021.

== Major associations ==
=== British Academy Television Awards ===
The British Academy Television Awards, also known as the BAFTA TV Awards, are given by the British Academy of Film and Television Arts honouring the best in television.

Year	Nominated work	Category	Result	Ref.
2014	The Fall	Best Actor	Nominated	

=== Golden Globe Awards ===
The Golden Globe Awards is an annual award ceremony where excellence in both film and television industries are celebrated.

Year	Nominated work	Category	Result	Ref.
2022	Belfast	Best Supporting Actor – Motion Picture	Nominated	

=== Actor Awards ===
The Actor Awards presented annually by the SAG-AFTRA Foundation, honour outstanding acting performances in film and television.

Year	Nominated work	Category	Result	Ref.
2022	Belfast	Outstanding Performance by a Cast in a Motion Picture ^{¥}	Nominated	

== Critics awards ==
Year	Nominated work	Category	Result	Ref.
Alliance of Women Film Journalists
2021	Belfast	Best Supporting Actor	Nominated	
Broadcasting Press Guild Awards
2014	The Fall	Breakthrough Award	Won	
Critics' Choice Movie Awards
2021	Belfast	Best Supporting Actor	Nominated	
2021	Belfast	Best Acting Ensemble ^{¥}	Won	
Florida Film Critics Circle
2021	Belfast	Best Supporting Actor	Nominated	
Hawaii Film Critics Society
2021	Belfast	Best Supporting Actor	Nominated	
Houston Film Critics Society
2021	Belfast	Best Ensemble Cast ^{¥}	Nominated	
Hollywood Creative Alliance
2021	Belfast	Best Supporting Actor	Nominated	
2021	Belfast	Best Ensemble Cast ^{¥}	Won	
Indiana Film Journalists Association
2021	Barb and Star Go to Vista Del Mar	Best Supporting Actor	Nominated	
Iowa Film Critics Association
2021	Belfast	Best Supporting Actor	2nd Place	
Online Film and Television Association
2022	Belfast	Best Ensemble ^{¥}	Nominated	
San Diego Film Critics Society
2021	Barb and Star Go to Vista Del Mar	Best Comedic Performance	Nominated	
2023	A Haunting in Venice	Best Performance by an Ensemble ^{§}	Runner-up	
St. Louis Film Critics Association
2021	Belfast	Best Ensemble Cast ^{¥}	Nominated	
Washington D.C. Area Film Critics Association
2021	Belfast	Best Supporting Actor	Nominated	
2021	Belfast	Best Ensemble ^{¥}	Nominated	

== Other accolades ==
Year	Nominated work	Category	Result	Ref.
AACTA Awards
2022	The Tourist	Best Lead Actor in a Television Drama	Nominated	
AACTA International Awards
2021	Belfast	Best Supporting Actor	Nominated	
British Independent Film Awards
2016	Anthropoid	Best Supporting Actor	Nominated	
Czech Lion Award
2016	Anthropoid	Best Supporting Actor	Nominated	
GQ Men of the Year Award
2014	The Fall	Vertu Breakthrough Artist of the Year	Won	
Irish Film and Television Awards
2014	—N/a	Rising Star	Won	
2014	The Fall	Best Lead Actor – TV Drama	Won	
2015	The Fall	Best Lead Actor – TV Drama	Nominated	
2017	The Siege of Jadotville	Best Actor-Film	Nominated	
2022	Belfast	Best Supporting Actor-Film	Nominated	
Logie Awards
2022	The Tourist	Most Outstanding Actor	Nominated	
MTV Movie and TV Awards
2016	Fifty Shades of Grey	MTV Movie Award for Best Kiss (with Dakota Johnson)	Nominated	
National Film Awards UK
2017	Anthropoid	Best Supporting Actor	Nominated	
2022	Belfast	Outstanding Performance	Nominated	
People's Choice Awards
2018	Fifty Shades Freed	The Drama Movie Star	Won	
Satellite Awards
2021	Belfast	Best Supporting Actor - Motion Picture	Nominated	
TV Times Awards
2022	The Tourist	Favourite Dramatic Performance	Nominated	

== Film festival awards ==
Film Festival	Year	Nominated work	Category	Result	Ref.
Capri Hollywood International Film Festival	2021	Belfast	Best Supporting Actor	Won	
Denver Film Festival	2021	—N/a	Excellence in Acting Award	Honoured	
Napa Valley Film Festival	2021	Belfast	Spotlight Award	Honoured	
Palm Springs International Film Festival	2021	Belfast	Vanguard Award^{¥}	Honoured	
Santa Barbara International Film Festival	2022	Belfast	Virtuoso Award	Honoured	
Richard Harris International Film Festival	2023	—N/a	Outstanding Talent Award	Honoured	

== Honorary degrees and awards ==
=== Honorary degree ===
Location	Date	Organisation	Position	Notes
Northern Ireland	11 December 2023	Queens University Belfast	Doctor of Arts (D.Arts)	

=== Honorary award ===
Location	Date	Organisation	Award	Notes
United States of America	25 March 2022	US-Ireland Alliance	Oscar Wilde Award	

== Fashion awards ==
=== The Fashion Awards ===
The Fashion Awards are organized by the British Fashion Council, with a view to recognizing outstanding contributions to fashion industry.

Year	Nominated work	Category	Result	Ref.
2013	—N/a	British Style Award	Nominated	

=== Models.com The Model of the Year Award ===
The Models.com annually organizes the Model of the Year Awards where fashion industry professionals vote for modelling talents.

Year	Nominated work	Category	Result	Ref.
2014	—N/a	Celebrity Model-Men (Industry's Choice)	Won	

== Listicle ==
Location	Date	Organisation	List	Rank
United States of America	8 December 2014	IMDb	IMDb Breakout STARmeter Awards	10th

== Parody award ==
=== Golden Raspberry Awards ===
The Golden Raspberry Awards are a set of parody awards.

Year	Nominated work	Category	Result	Ref.
2016	Fifty Shades of Grey	Worst Actor	Won	
2016	Fifty Shades of Grey	Worst Screen Combo ^{%}	Won	
2018	Fifty Shades Darker	Worst Actor	Nominated	
2018	Fifty Shades Darker	Worst Screen Combo ^{%}	Nominated	
2022	Belfast	Razzie Redeemer Award	Nominated	

== See also ==
- List of Jamie Dornan performances

== Notes ==
^¥Shared with Caitríona Balfe, Judi Dench, Jude Hill, Ciarán Hinds and Colin Morgan.
^%Shared with Dakota Johnson.
^§ Shared with Kenneth Branagh, Michelle Yeoh, Tina Fey, Kelly Reilly, Camille Cottin, Jude Hill, Emma Laird, Kyle Allen and Ali Khan.
