= List of Jamie Dornan performances =

Jamie Dornan filmography
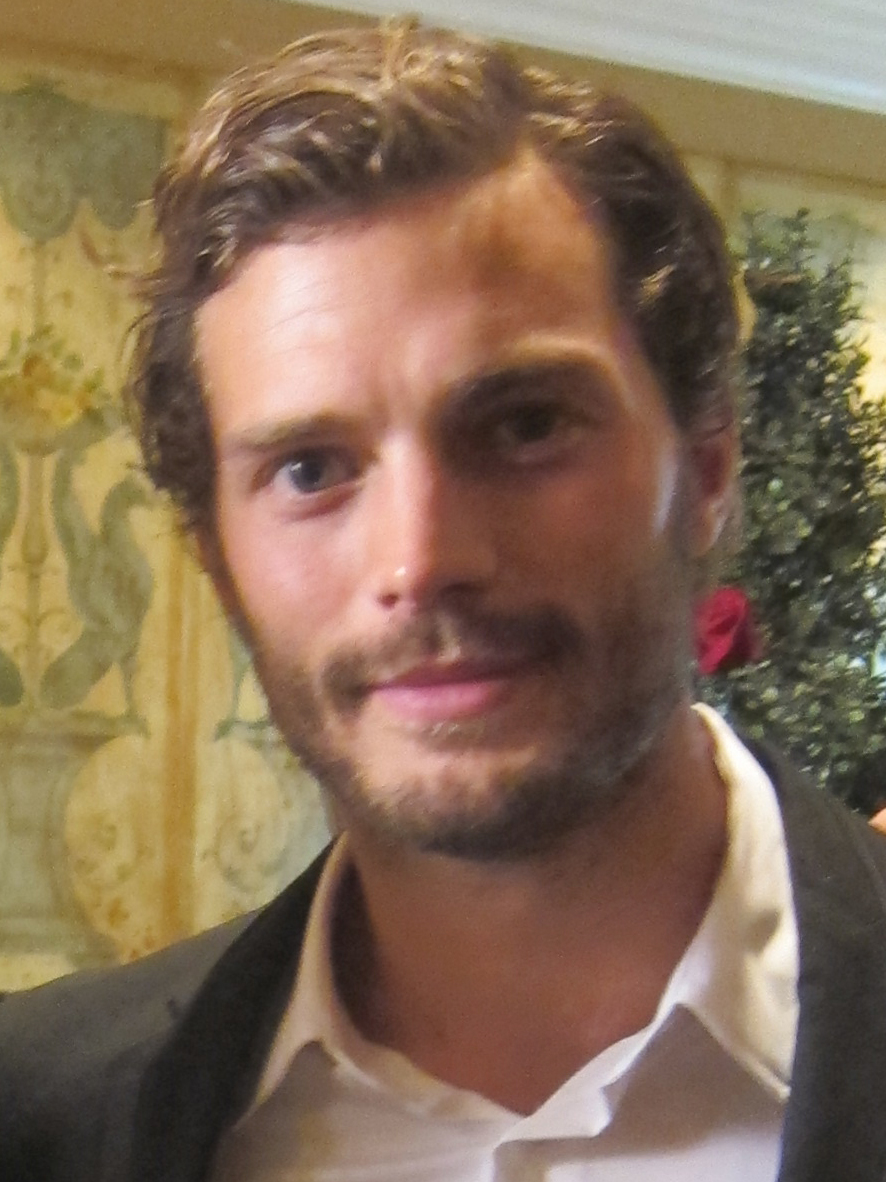
- Dornan in 2011

Filmography
- Feature films: 24
- Television series: 5

Actor Jamie Dornan initially began his career as a model. He made his screen debut in 2006 with Sofia Coppola's drama film Marie Antoinette playing Count Axel Fersen. As he still continued modelling in that decade, he had infrequent appearances in independent and short films mostly with small roles. He drew wider public attention with his appearance in ABC television series Once Upon a Time (2011). Playing a serial killer Paul Spector, also a bereavement counsellor, in BBC crime drama The Fall (2013–2016), brought him his breakthrough and critical acclaim. For his performance in The Fall, he was nominated for a British Academy Television Award for Best Actor.

His stardom followed further as in 2013, he was cast as Christian Grey in the film adaptation of the novel Fifty Shades of Grey. He later reprised the same role in Fifty Shades Darker and Fifty Shades Freed. The franchise became a commercial success as it earned approximately $1.32 billion. After the Fifty Shades franchise, he appeared in war films Anthropoid and The Siege of Jadotville, both in 2016. For his supporting turn as Jan Kubiš in the former film, he was nominated for the Czech Lion Award for Best Supporting Actor. He later appeared in comedy films Wild Mountain Thyme (2020) and Barb and Star Go to Vista Del Mar (2021).

Dornan appeared in Kenneth Branagh's semi-biographical drama film Belfast, in 2021, co-starring alongside Ciaran Hinds, Judi Dench and Caitriona Balfe, as a working class father who was trying to protect his family during The Troubles. His performance earned him a nomination for the Golden Globe Award for Best Supporting Actor – Motion Picture. He played the lead role of Elliot Stanley/Eugene Cassidy in the thriller drama series The Tourist (2022–2024).

Dornan was also the lead singer in the folk band Sons of Jim until it disbanded in 2008.

== Film ==
Key
†	Denotes film that have not yet been released

Year (Note: Refers to the film's earliest release)	Title	Role(s)	Director	Notes	Ref.
2006	Marie Antoinette	Axel von Fersen	Sofia Coppola		
2008	Beyond the Rave	Ed	Mathias Hoene		
2009	Shadows in the Sun	Joe	David Rocksavage		
2009	X Returns	X	Ammo	Short film	
2009	Nice to Meet You	The Young Man	Will Garthwait	Short film	
2014	Flying Home	Colin Montgomery	Dominique Deruddere		
2015	Fifty Shades of Grey	Christian Grey	Sam Taylor-Johnson		
2015	Burnt	Leon Sweeney	John Wells	Deleted scenes	
2016	Anthropoid	Jan Kubis	Sean Ellis		
2016	The Siege of Jadotville	Pat Quinlan	Richie Smyth		
2016	The 9th Life of Louis Drax	Dr. Allan Pascal	Alexandre Aja		
2017	Fifty Shades Darker	Christian Grey	James Foley		
2018	Fifty Shades Freed	Christian Grey	James Foley		
2018	Untogether	Nick	Emma Forrest		
2018	A Private War	Paul Conroy	Matthew Heineman		
2018	Robin Hood	Will Scarlet	Otto Bathurst		
2019	Endings, Beginnings	Jack	Drake Doremus		
2019	Synchronic	Dennis Dannelly	Justin Benson and Aaron Moorhead		
2020	Trolls World Tour	Chaz	Walt Dohrn	Voice role	
2020	Wild Mountain Thyme	Anthony Reilly	John Patrick Shanley		
2021	Barb and Star Go to Vista Del Mar	Edgar Pagét	Josh Greenbaum		
2021	Belfast	"Pa"	Kenneth Branagh		
2023	Heart of Stone	Parker	Tom Harper		
2023	A Haunting in Venice	Dr. Leslie Ferrier	Kenneth Branagh		
2025	Nostalgie	—N/a	Kathryn Ferguson	Short film; executive producer	
2027	The Lord of the Rings: The Hunt for Gollum	Strider / Aragorn	Andy Serkis	Post-production	
TBA	Love Is Not the Answer	Tom	Michael Cera	Post-production	
TBA	The Turning Door	TBA	Nicholas Ashe Bateman	Voice role; in production	
TBA	Die Alive	TBA	Megan Park	Filming	

== Television ==
Year	Title	Role(s)	Notes	Ref.
2011–2013	Once Upon a Time	Huntsman / Sheriff Graham Humbert	Main role (season 1), Guest star (season 2); 9 episodes	
2013–2016	The Fall	Paul Spector	Main role; 17 episodes	
2014	New Worlds	Abe Goffe	Miniseries; 4 episodes	
2018	My Dinner with Hervé	Danny Tate	Television film	
2018	Death and Nightingales	Liam Ward	Miniseries; 3 episodes	
2022–2024	The Tourist	The Man / Elliot Stanley / Eugene Cassidy	Lead role; 12 episodes (also executive producer for series 2)	
2026	Saturday Night Live UK	Himself (host)	Episode: "Jamie Dornan/Wolf Alice"	
2026	12 12 12	Paul Galvin	Main role; also executive producer	
2027	The Twin	Adam and Lee (Note: Dornan played dual roles)	Upcoming series; also executive producer	

== Discography ==
=== As singer ===
Year	Soundtrack	Song	Label	Ref.
2005		"Fairytale"	Doorstep Records	
2006		"My Burning Sun"	Doorstep Records	
2006		"Don't Throw Your Love Away"	Doorstep Records	
2006		"Only On the Outside"	Sons of Jim	
2007		"When I Go"	Sons of Jim	
2018	Fifty Shades Freed	"Maybe I'm Amazed"	Republic Records; Universal Studios	
2020	Wild Mountain Thyme	"Wild Mountain Thyme" _{(with Emily Blunt)}	Lakeshore Records	
2021	Barb and Star Go to Vista Del Mar	"Edgar's Prayer"	Milan Records	
2021	Barb and Star Go to Vista Del Mar	"Palm Vista Hotel" _{(with the cast)}	Milan Records	
2021	Belfast	"Everlasting Love" _{(his vocal was used along with the original song)}		

=== As narrator ===
Year	Title	Role	Note	Ref.
2022	Sleep Sound with Jamie Dornan	Narrator	Six-part sleep aid podcast published by Audible	

== Selected modelling campaigns ==
Year	Brand	Campaign	Ref.
2004	Dolce & Gabbana	Promoting watches	
2005	Dior	Dior Homme (fragrance commercial)	
2006	Levi's	Walk The Line (denim commercial)	
2009	Giorgio Armani	Promoting spring-summer collection	
2010	Calvin Klein	CK Free (fragrance commercial)	
2010	Calvin Klein	Promoting Calvin Klein jeans	
2010	Calvin Klein	Calvin Klein White Label	
2011	Banana Republic	Promoting spring-summer collection	
2011	Desigual	Promoting spring-summer collection	
2011	Zara	Promoting spring collection	
2011	Hugo Boss	Promoting fall collection	
2014	Ermenegildo Zegna	Eminences Grises, Promoting spring-summer collection	
2018	Hugo Boss	Boss The Scent (fragrance commercial)	
2021	Guinness	promoting Guinness Nitrosurge	
2023	Loewe	Fall/Winter 2023 Men's Campaign	

== See also ==
- List of awards and nominations received by Jamie Dornan
