= Florida Film Critics Circle Awards 2021 =

Annual US film awards ceremony

26th FFCC Awards

December 22, 2021

Best Picture:
The Power of the Dog

The 26th Florida Film Critics Circle Awards were held on December 22, 2021.

The nominations were announced on December 15, 2021, led by The Power of the Dog with nine nominations.

== Winners and nominees ==
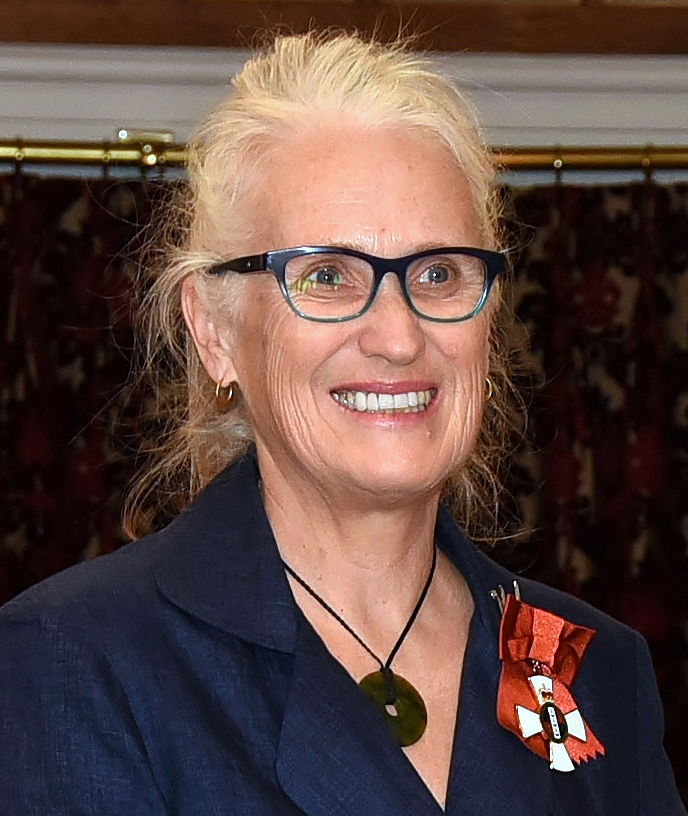
Jane Campion, Best Director and Best Adapted Screenplay winner

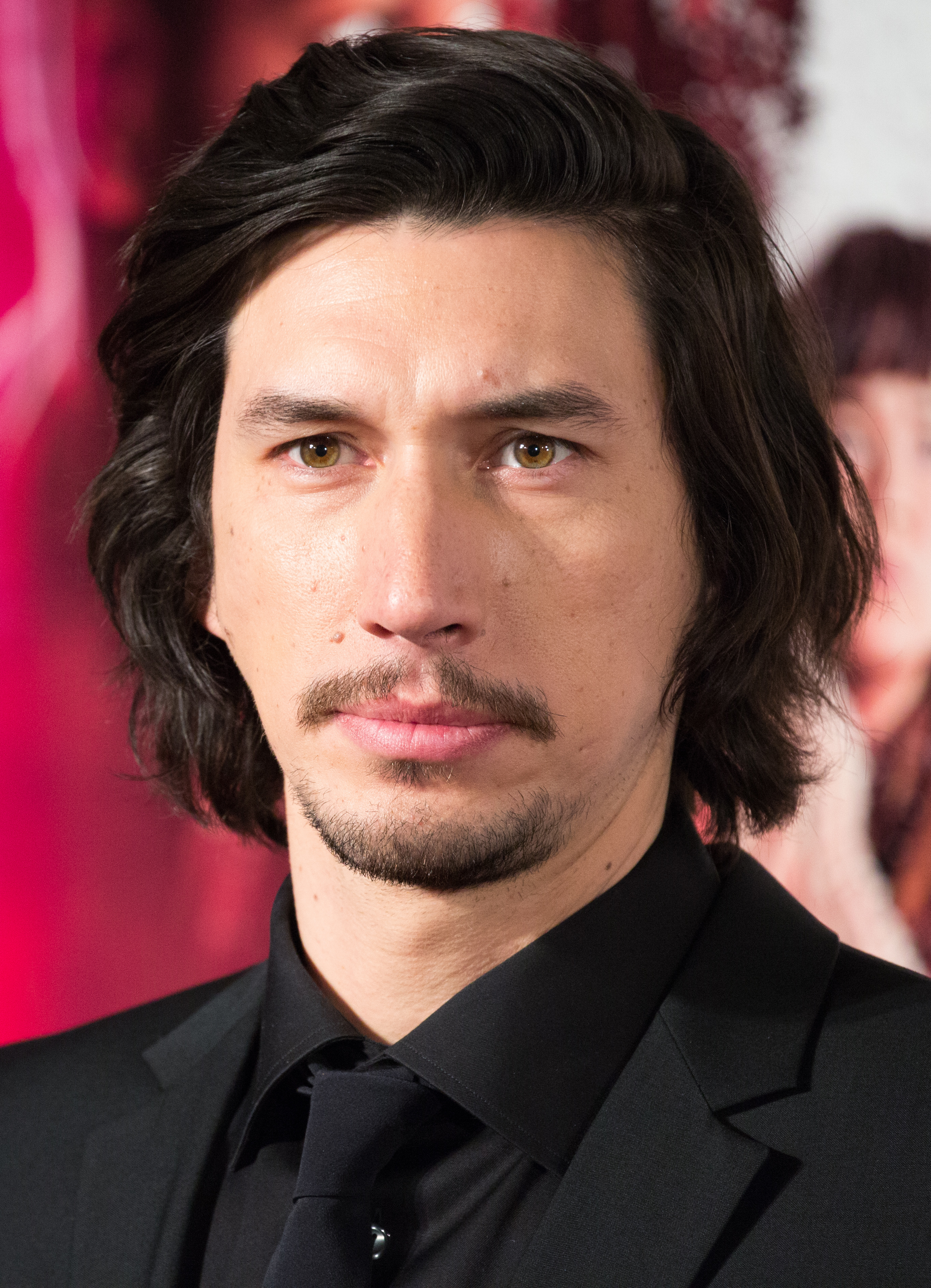
Adam Driver, Best Actor winner

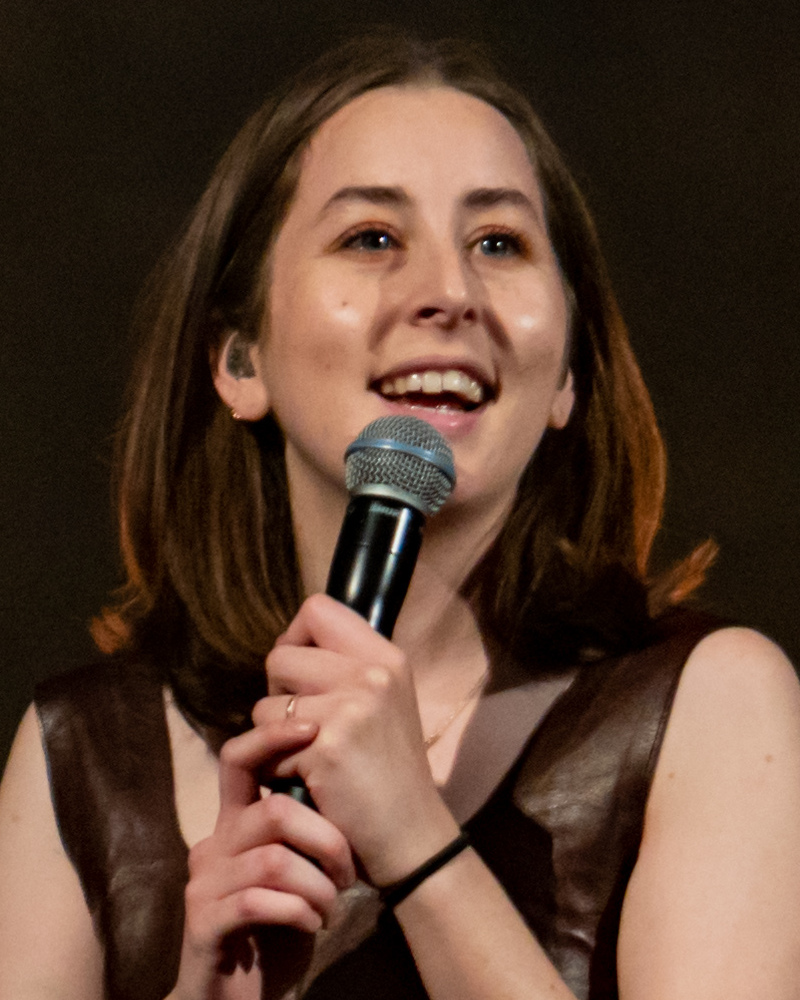
Alana Haim, Best Actress winner

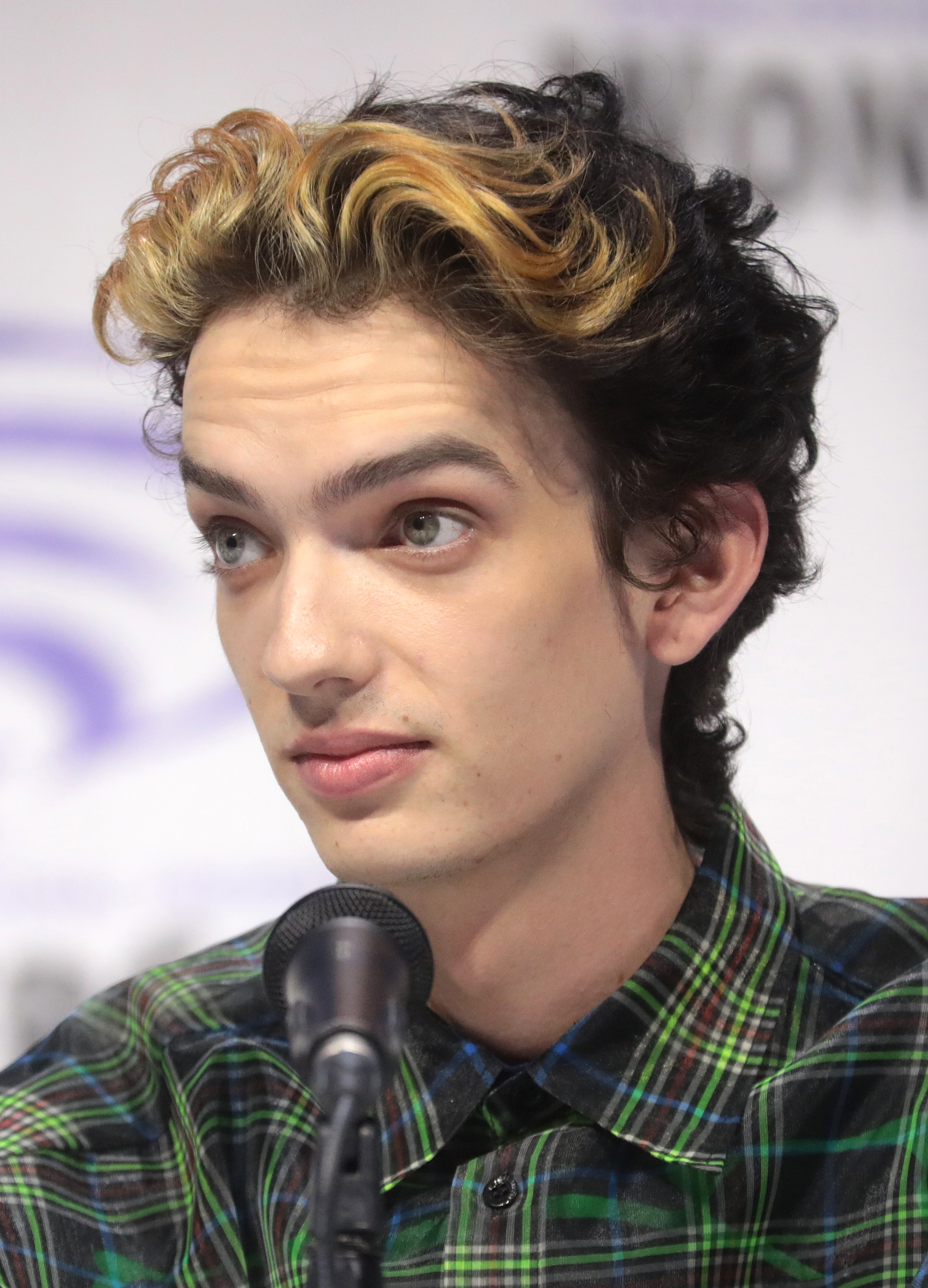
Kodi Smit-McPhee, Best Supporting Actor winner

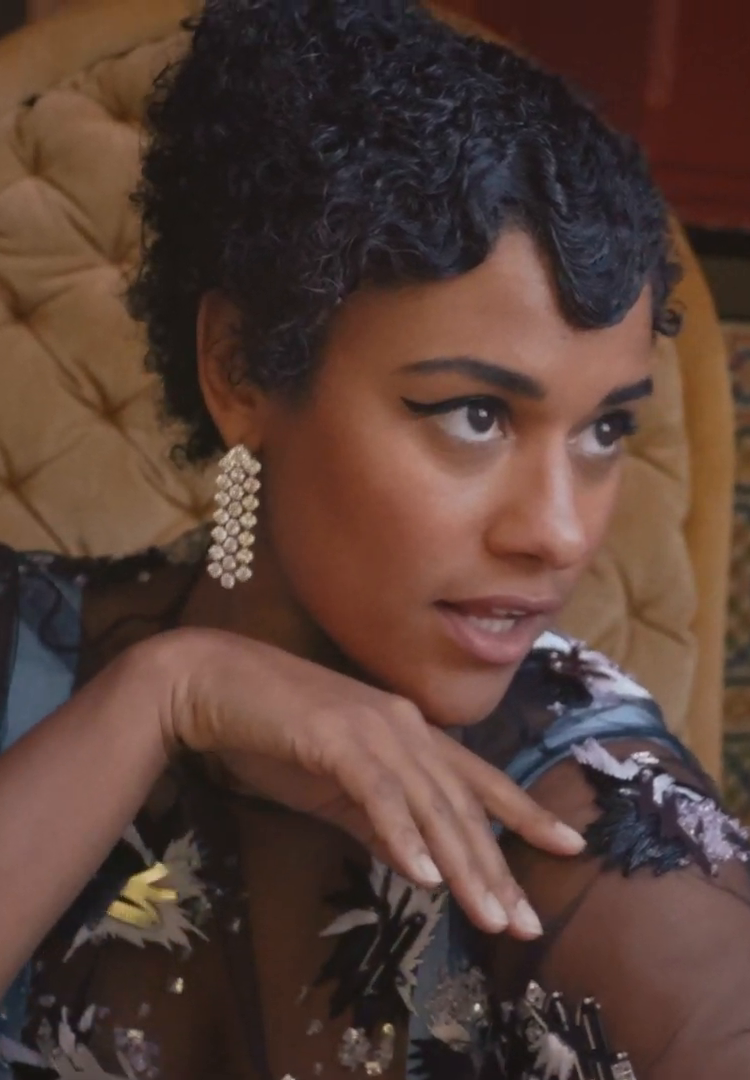
Ariana DeBose, Best Supporting Actress winner

Winners are listed at the top of each list in bold, while the runner-ups for each category are listed under them.

| Best Picture | Best Director |
|---|---|
| **The Power of the Dog**: Runner-up: Annette; Mass | **Jane Campion – The Power of the Dog**: Runner-up: Leos Carax – Annette; Kenneth Branagh – Belfast; Ryusuke Hamaguchi – Wheel of Fortune and Fantasy |
| Best Actor | Best Actress |
| **Adam Driver – Annette as Henry McHenry**: Runner-up: Benedict Cumberbatch – The Power of the Dog as Phil Burbank; Nicolas Cage – Pig as Robin "Rob" Feld; Andrew Garfield – tick, tick... BOOM! as Jonathan Larson; Oscar Isaac – The Card Counter as William Tell | **Alana Haim – Licorice Pizza as Alana Kane**: Runner-up: Jessica Chastain – The Eyes of Tammy Faye as Tammy Faye Bakker; Lady Gaga – House of Gucci as Patrizia Reggiani; Kristen Stewart – Spencer as Diana, Princess of Wales |
| Best Supporting Actor | Best Supporting Actress |
| **Kodi Smit-McPhee – The Power of the Dog as Peter Gordon**: Runner-up: Vincent Lindon – Titane as Vincent; Jamie Dornan – Belfast as Pa; Jared Leto – House of Gucci as Paolo Gucci; J. K. Simmons – Being the Ricardos as William Frawley | **Ariana DeBose – West Side Story as Anita**: Runner-up: Ruth Negga – Passing as Clare Bellew; Kirsten Dunst – The Power of the Dog as Rose Gordon |
| Best Adapted Screenplay | Best Original Screenplay |
| **Jane Campion – The Power of the Dog**: Runner-up: Steven Levenson – tick, tick... BOOM!; Runner-up: Tony Kushner – West Side Story; François Ozon – Summer of 85 | **Wes Anderson – The French Dispatch**: Runner-up: Leos Carax, Ron Mael, and Russell Mael – Annette; Runner-up: Ryusuke Hamaguchi – Wheel of Fortune and Fantasy; Runner-up: Paul Thomas Anderson – Licorice Pizza; Kenneth Branagh – Belfast; Fran Kranz – Mass; Kristen Wiig and Annie Mumolo – Barb and Star Go to Vista Del Mar |
| Best Animated Film | Best Documentary Film |
| **Encanto**: Runner-up: Evangelion: 3.0+1.0 Thrice Upon a Time; Runner-up: Flee; Runner-up: Josep; Belle; Luca; The Mitchells vs. the Machines | **Summer of Soul (...Or, When the Revolution Could Not Be Televised)**: Runner-up: Procession; Flee |
| Best Foreign Language Film | Best Ensemble |
| **The Hand of God**: Runner-up: Drive My Car; Runner-up: Titane; Runner-up: Wheel of Fortune and Fantasy; Riders of Justice | **Mass**: Runner-up: Wheel of Fortune and Fantasy; Licorice Pizza; The Power of the Dog; West Side Story |
| Best Art Direction / Production Design | Best Cinematography |
| **Dune**: Runner-up: Barb and Star Go to Vista Del Mar; Annette; West Side Story | **Ari Wegner – The Power of the Dog**: Runner-up: Janusz Kamiński – West Side Story; Runner-up: Claire Mathon – Spencer; Greig Fraser – Dune; Mike Gioulakis – Old |
| Best Score | Best Visual Effects |
| **Hans Zimmer – Dune**: Runner-up: Jonny Greenwood – The Power of the Dog; Alexandre Desplat – The French Dispatch; Ron Mael and Russell Mael – Annette | **Dune**: Runner-up: Annette; Shang-Chi and the Legend of the Ten Rings |
| Best First Film | Breakout Award |
| **Pig**: Runner-up: Mass; Runner-up: Passing; The Lost Daughter; Shiva Baby | **Cooper Hoffman – Licorice Pizza as Gary Valentine**: Runner-up: Rachel Zegler – West Side Story as María Vasquez; Jude Hill – Belfast as Buddy |
