= Trayce Field =

American costume designer

Trayce Gigi Field
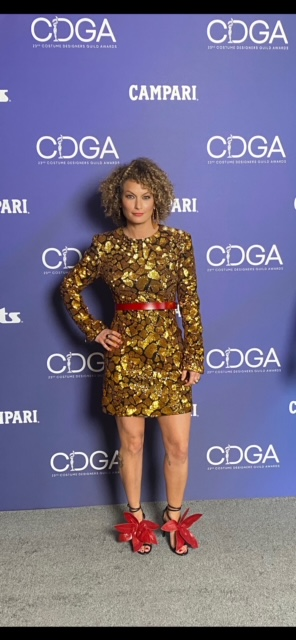
- Born: U.S.
- Education: Fashion Institute of Design & Merchandising
- Occupations: Costume designer, stylist
- Years active: 1999–present

Trayce Gigi Field is an American costume designer and stylist, based in Los Angeles.

== Career ==
Field graduated from the Fashion Institute of Design & Merchandising. She is a member of the Costume Designers Guild. She also hosted the podcast Hustle & Know, produced by Warner Bros.

Field is best known for her work in the television series Dead to Me, A League of Their Own, 2 Broke Girls, Poker Face and the films Barb and Star Go to Vista Del Mar, and Precious.

== Filmography ==
=== Television ===
- 2026 - Spider-Noir
- 2022 – Poker Face
- 2022 – A League of Their Own
- 2022 – The Afterparty
- 2019-2022 – Dead to Me
- 2021 – Kids Say the Darndest Things
- 2020 – Sarah Cooper: Everything's Fine
- 2020 – AJ and the Queen
- 2019 – Now Apocalypse
- 2018 – 25
- 2018 – Juicy Stories
- 2018 – The Royal Wedding Live with Cord and Tish!
- 2018 – Corporate
- 2018 – The 2018 Rose Parade Hosted by Cord & Tish
- 2017 – Real Life
- 2017 – Love You More
- 2011-2017 – 2 Broke Girls
- 2015 – The Spoils Before Dying
- 2015 – One Big Happy
- 2014 – The Comeback
- 2014 – The Spoils of Babylon
- 2010-2011 – Funny or Die Presents
- 2009 – Evan and Gareth Are Trying to Get Laid

=== Film ===
- 2021 – Barb and Star Go to Vista Del Mar
- 2019 – What's My Name: Muhammad Ali
- 2013 – The To Do List
- 2012 – Casa de mi padre
- 2011 – 10 Years
- 2011 – Take Me Home
- 2011 – Fly Away
- 2011 – Little Birds
- 2010 – Kaboom
- 2008 – Adventures of Power
- 2006 – Hide & Seek
- 2004 – Within the Wall

== Awards and nominations ==
Year	Result	Award	Category	Work	Ref.
2022	Nominated	NAACP Image Awards	Outstanding Costume Design	A League of Their Own	
2020	Nominated	Costume Designers Guild	Excellence in Contemporary Film	Barb and Star Go to Vista Del Mar	
