= Jim Dornan =

Irish obstetrician and gynecologist (1948–2021)

James Connor Dornan (5 February 1948 – 15 March 2021) was a Northern Irish obstetrician and gynaecologist. He was also a professor and frequently lectured both nationally and internationally, holding the chair in foetal medicine at Queen's University Belfast and that in health & life sciences at Ulster University.

== Early life ==
Dornan was born in Holywood, County Down. His father, also Jim, was an accountant who served as the general manager of the Northern Ireland Institute for the Disabled. His mother, Clare, was the first occupational therapist in Northern Ireland.

Dornan attended Bangor Grammar School and from there went on to study medicine at Queen's University Belfast where he was mentored by Harith Lamki, Buster Holland and Ken Houston.

== Career ==
Qualifying in 1973, he did his houseman's year in the Belfast City Hospital before training in his chosen career. He once considered acting as a career. In 1976, he was seconded to Queen's University in Kingston, Canada as a perinatal resident. On returning to Northern Ireland, he rotated around the north to complete his training and obtain an Honours MD from Queen's in 1981 for his research into fetal breathing. In 1986, he was appointed a consultant senior lecturer and subsequently reader, before he followed professor Graham Harley at the Royal Maternity Hospital.

In 2004, Dornan was elected senior vice president of the Royal College of Obstetricians and Gynaecologists in London, having been on its Council as a fellow for the previous five years. This was issued with the particular responsibility for developing global health initiatives. Amongst them was the establishment of an emergency obstetrician that provides lifesaving skills for medics, midwives and nurses in under-resourced countries, while working closely with the Liverpool School of Tropical Medicine.

Dornan wrote a non-clinical book, An Everyday Miracle, which was published in September 2013 by Blackstaff Press. He also had a late in life turn at acting. He appeared in the third series of the ITV drama Marcella, which stars Anna Friel. He also played a porter in The Fall, in which his son Jamie Dornan played a serial killer.

== Personal life ==
Dornan had three children, Liesa, Jessica and Jamie from his marriage to his first wife, Lorna, who died of cancer. He lived in Belfast, Northern Ireland, and was married to his second wife Samina who is also a gynaecologist and obstetrician and a strong supporter of legalising abortion in Northern Ireland. She appeared in the BBC Three documentary, Abortion: Ireland's Guilty Secret?. Dornan died on 15 March 2021 after having suffered from COVID-19. He had previously been diagnosed with chronic lymphocytic leukaemia.
