= IFTA Award for Best Lead Actor – TV Drama =

Irish television industry award

IFTA Award for Lead Actor – Drama
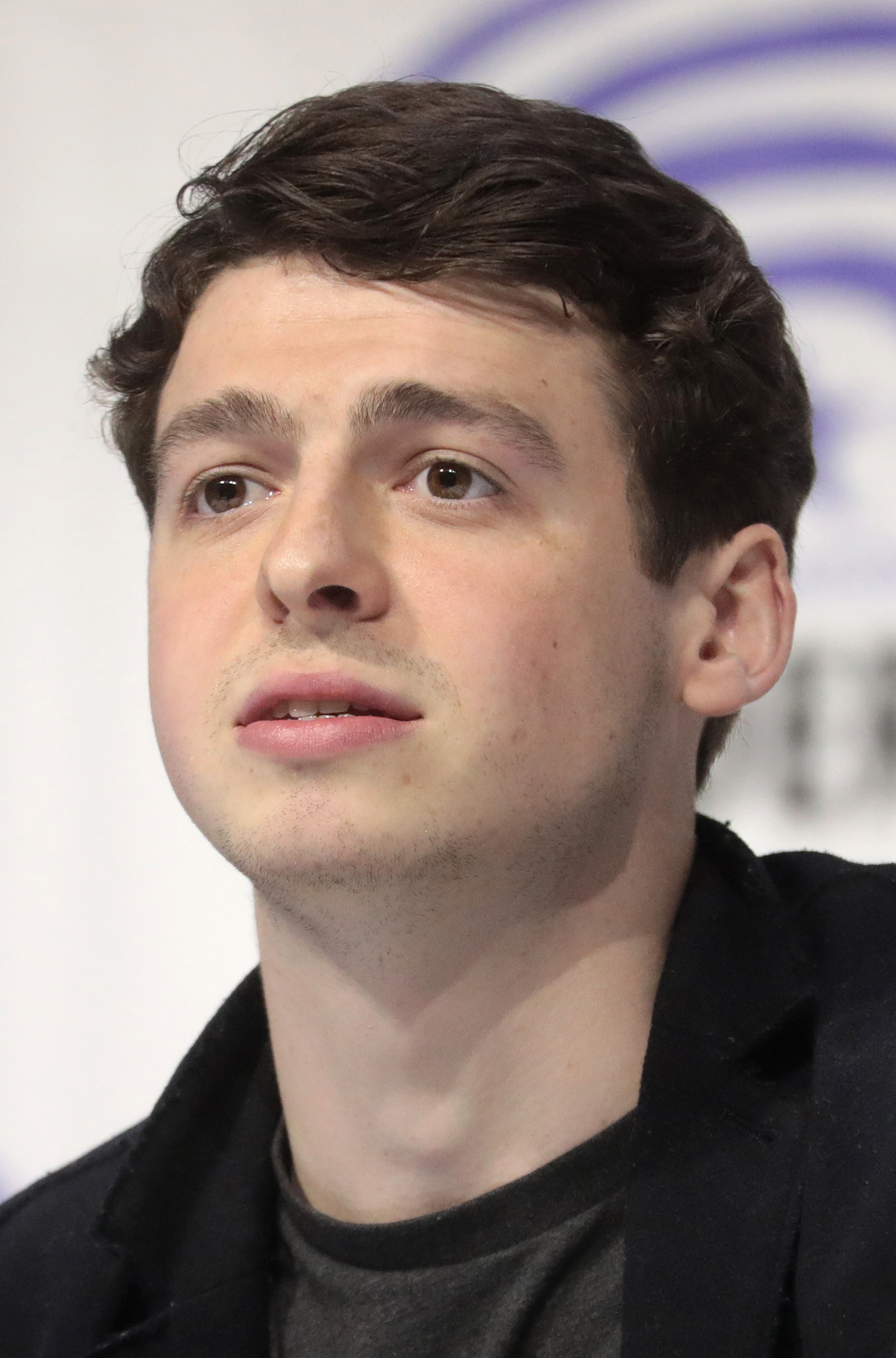
- The 2025 recipient: Anthony Boyle
- Awarded for: Best Performance by an Actor in a Leading Role
- Country: Ireland
- Presented by: Irish Film & Television Academy (IFTA)
- First award: 2003
- Most recent winner: Anthony Boyle, House of Guinness (2026)
- Website: ifta.ie

The IFTA Award for Lead Actor – Drama is an award presented annually by the Irish Film & Television Academy (IFTA). It has been presented since the 1st Irish Film & Television Awards ceremony in 2003 to an Irish actor who has delivered an outstanding performance in a leading role on television.

The record for most wins is three, held by Aidan Gillen. The record for most nominations is seven, held by David Nesbitt, who has won the award once. Anthony Boyle is the award's most recent winner, for House of Guinness (2025).

== Eligibility ==
The award is exclusively open to Irish actors. The rules define an Irish person as follows:

- Born in Ireland (32 counties) or
- Have Irish Citizenship or
- Be full-time resident in Ireland (minimum of 3 years)

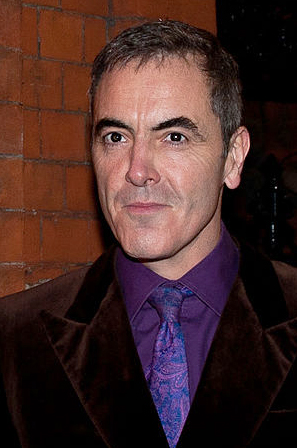
James Nesbitt was the award's first winner, winning for Murphy's Law in 2003.

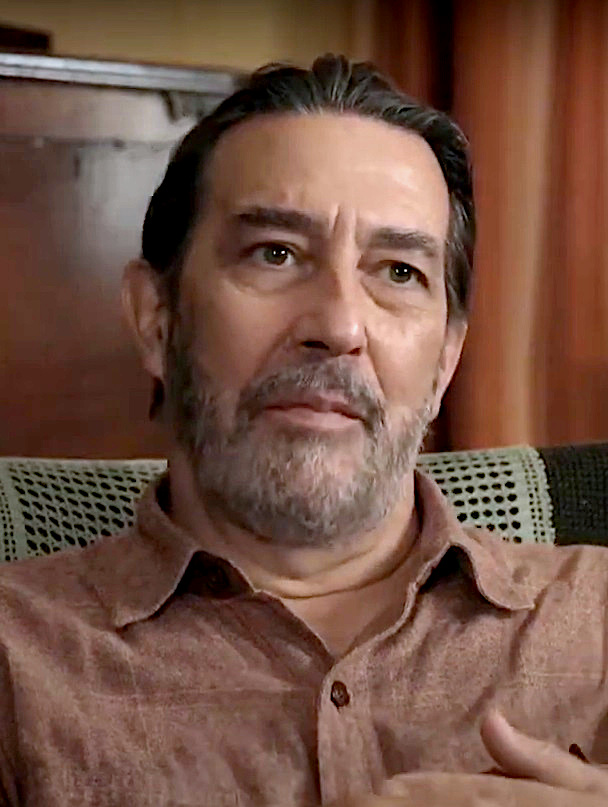
Ciarán Hinds won twice, for The Mayor of Casterbridge and for Rome.

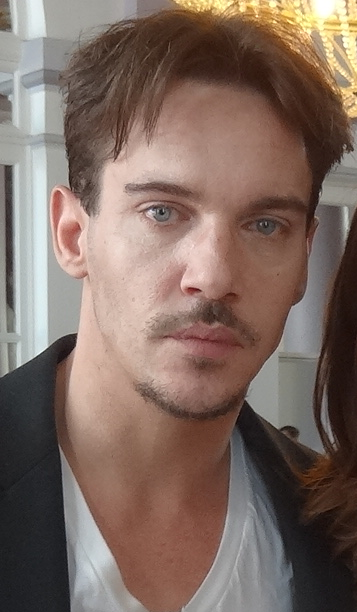
Jonathan Rhys Meyers won for The Tudors.

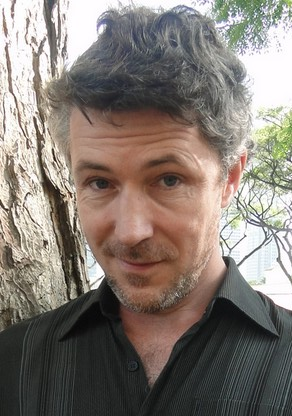
Aidan Gillen won three times, for The Wire, Love/Hate and Charlie.

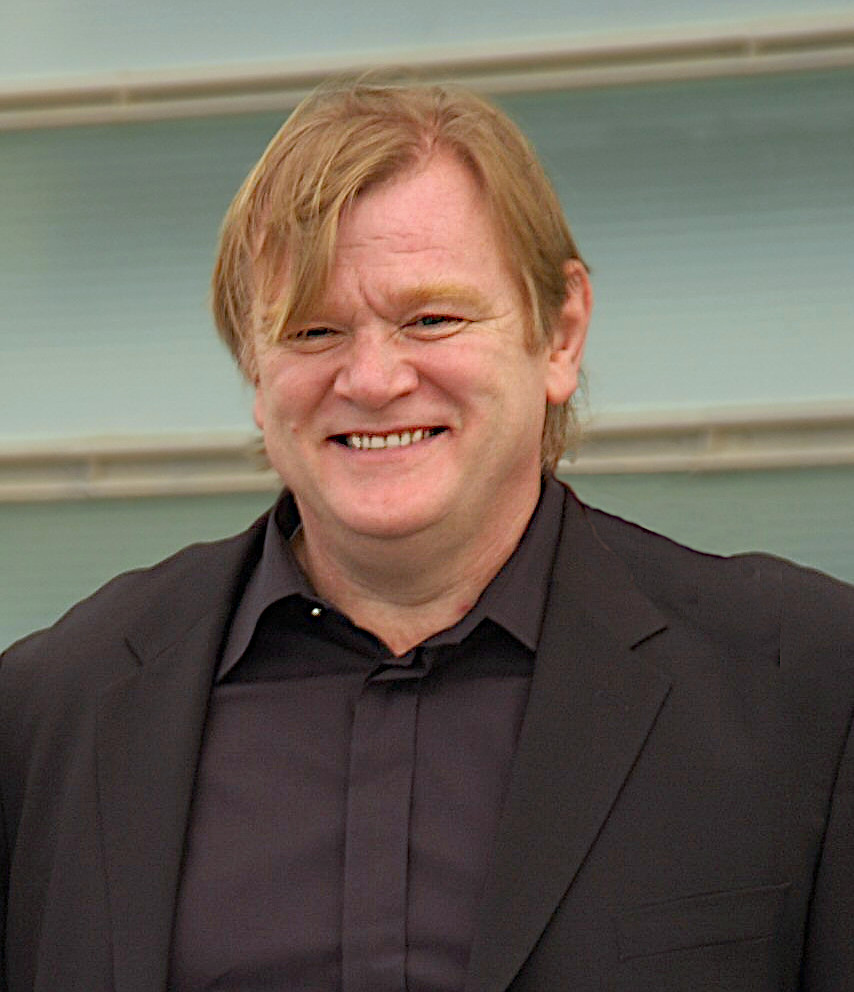
Brendan Gleeson won for Into the Storm (2009).

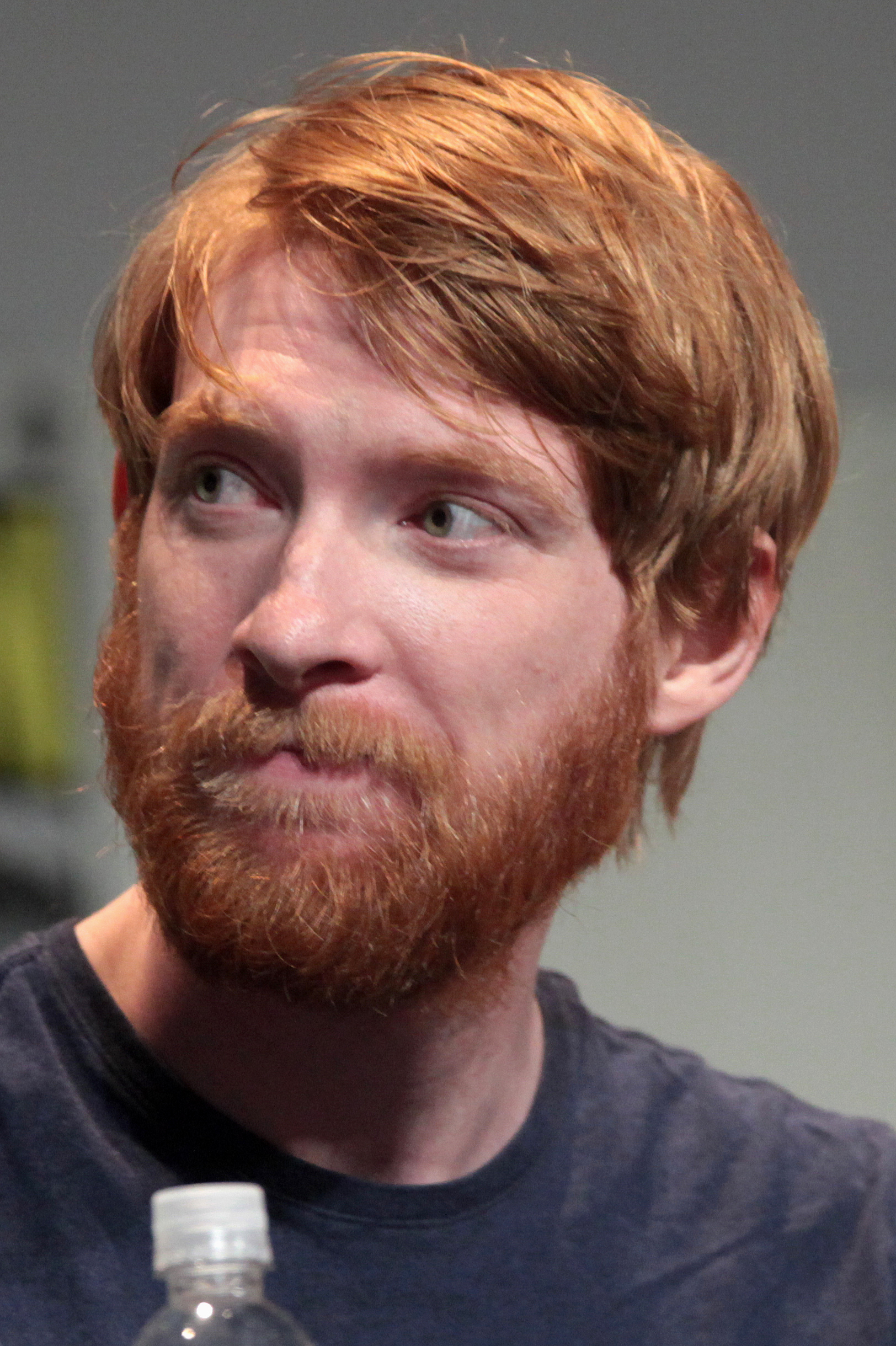
Domhnall Gleeson won for When Harvey Met Bob (2010).

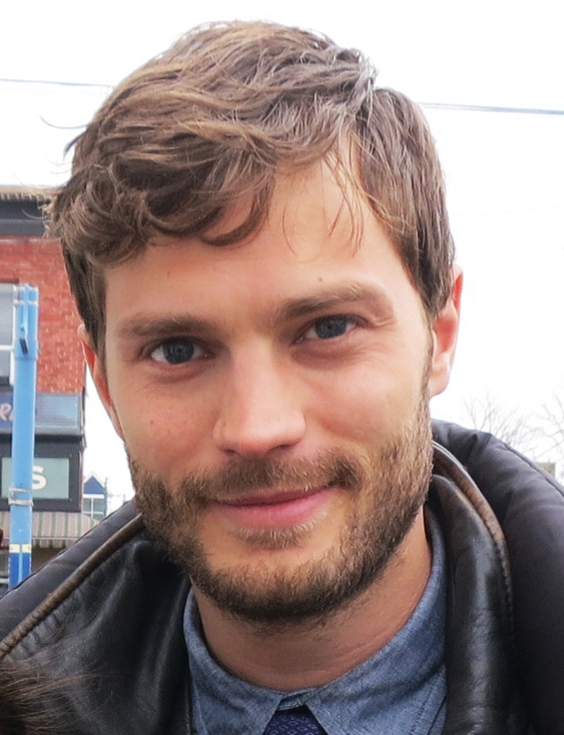
Jamie Dornan won for The Fall.

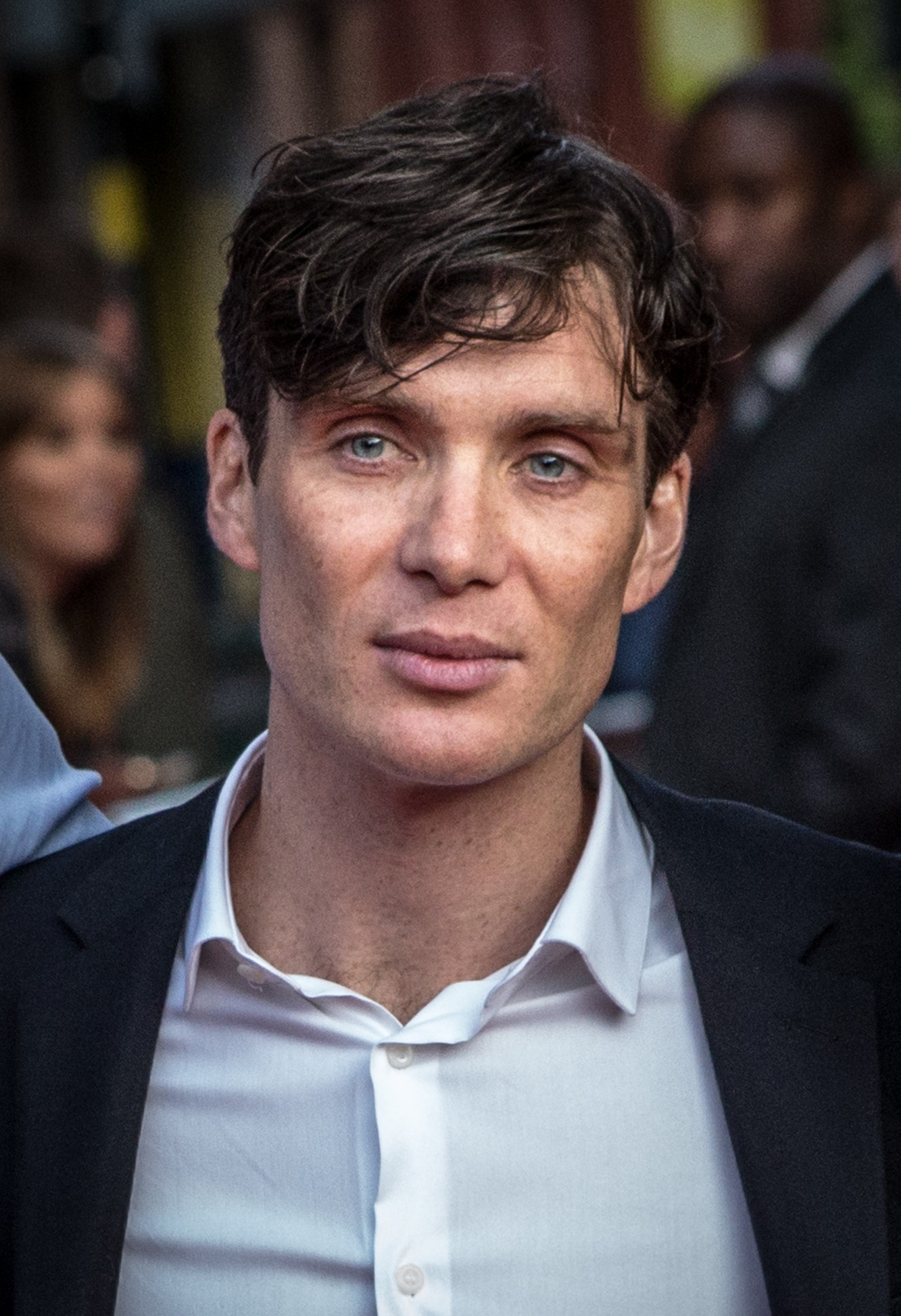
Cillian Murphy won twice for Peaky Blinders.

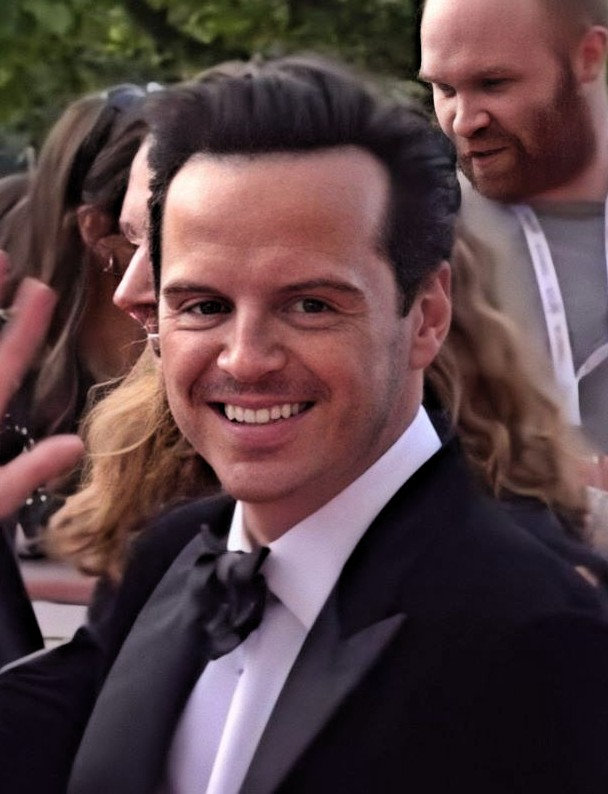
Andrew Scott won for Black Mirror: Smithereens (2019).

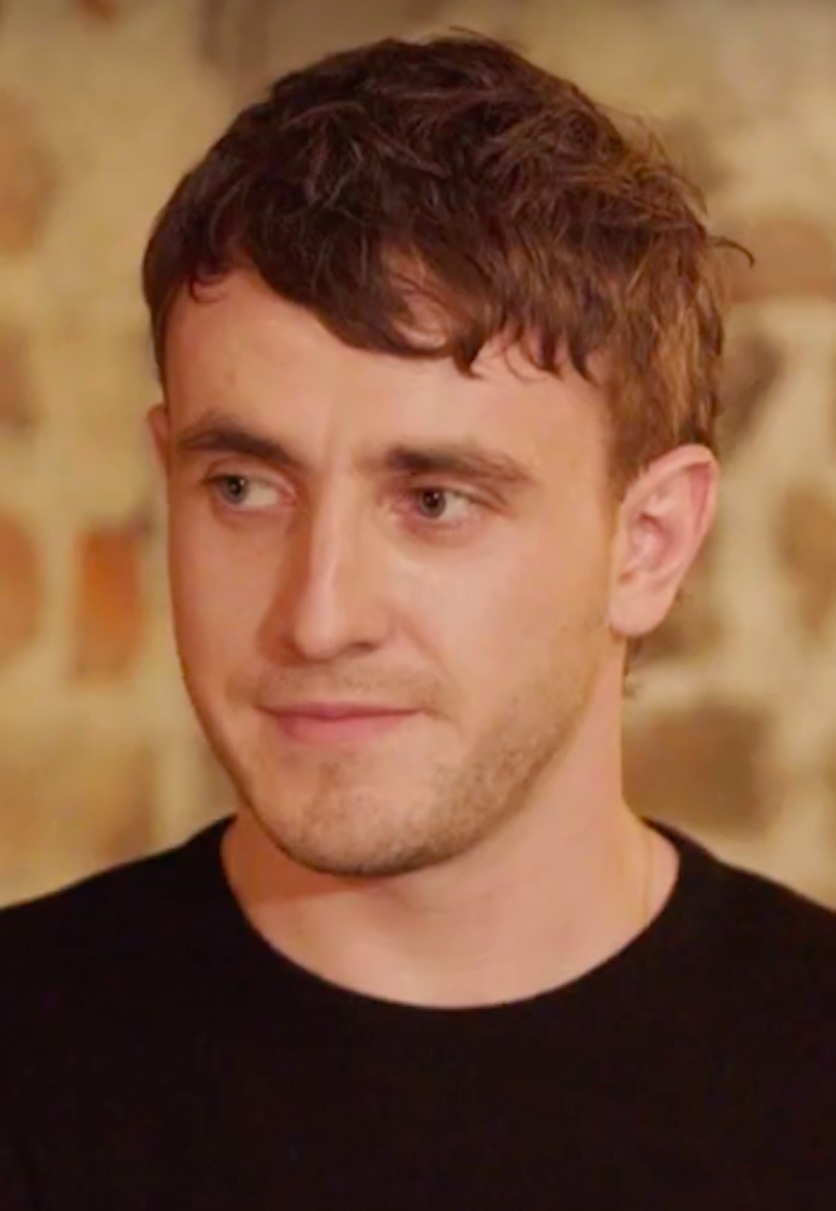
Paul Mescal won for Normal People (2020).

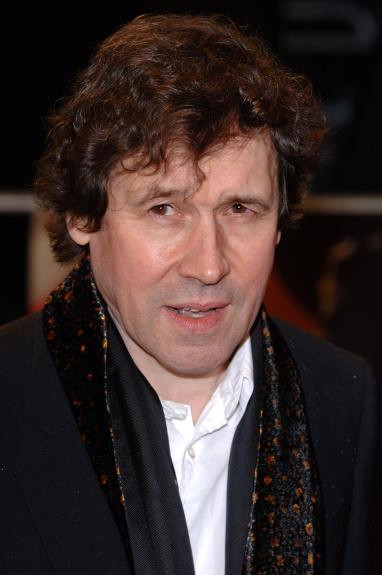
Stephen Rea won for The English (2022).

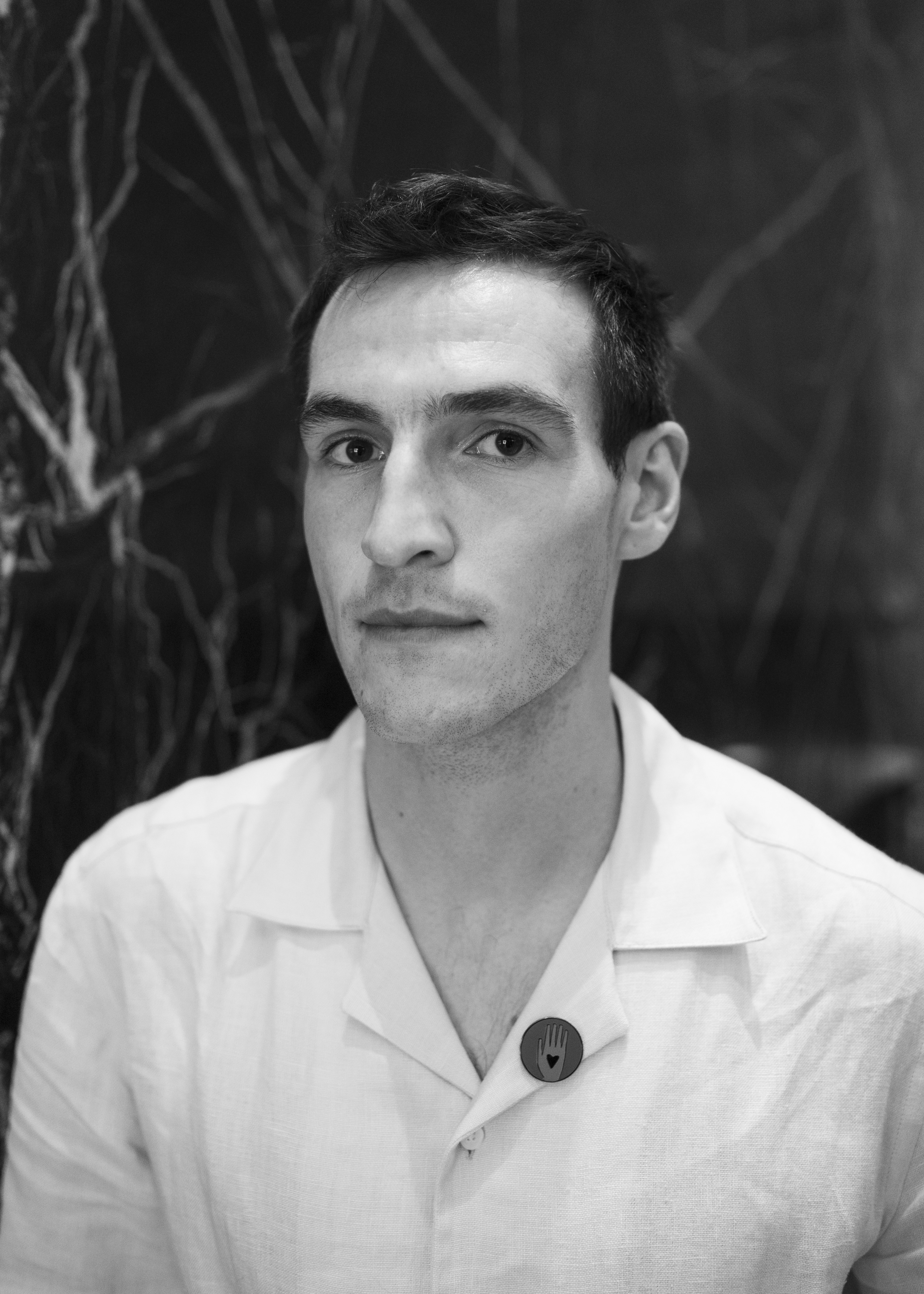
Éanna Hardwicke won for The Sixth Commandment (2023).

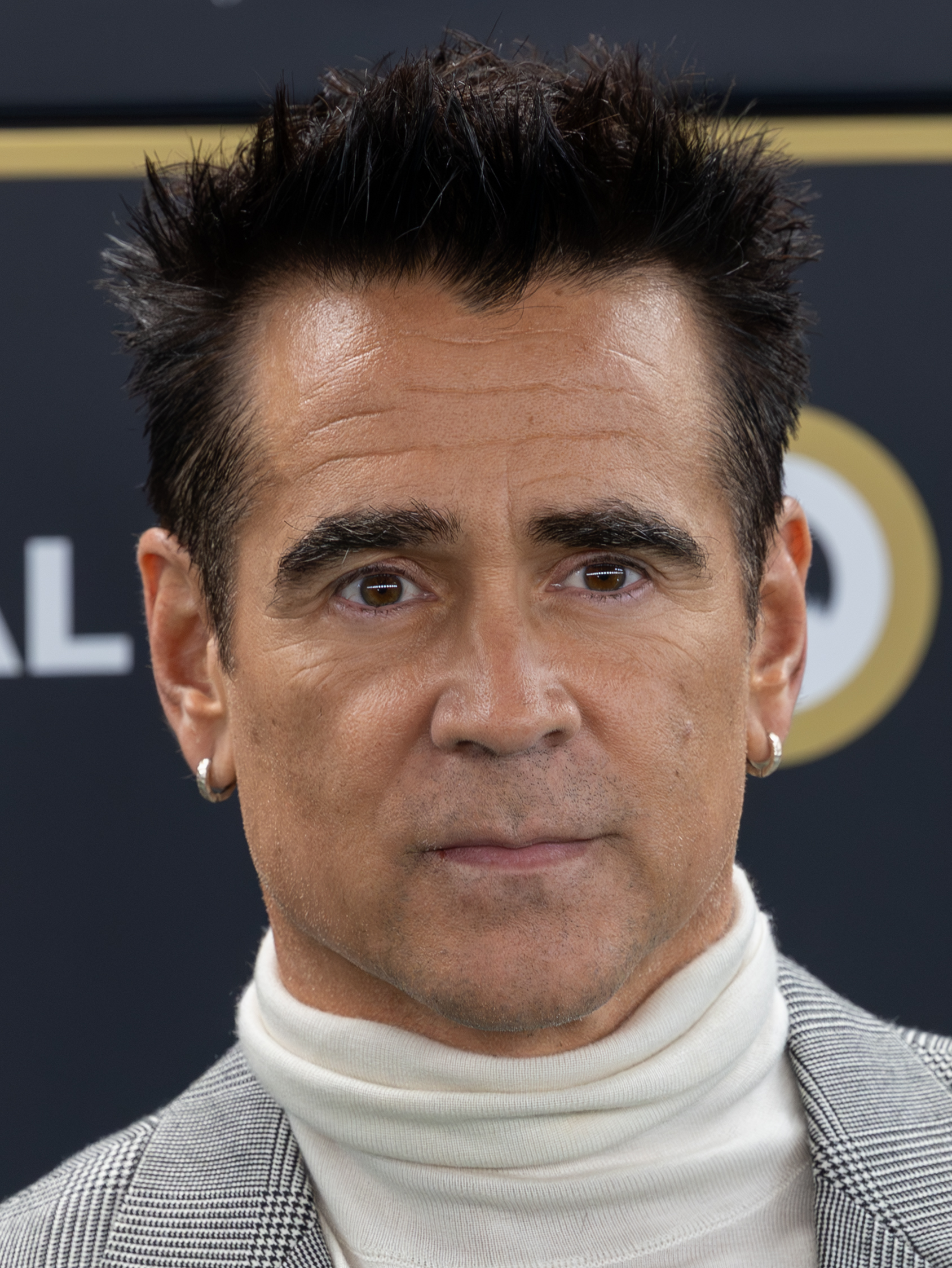
Colin Farrell won for The Penguin (2024).

== Winners and nominees ==
In the following table, the years are listed as the year of television. The first three ceremonies were held at the end of the year, but since the 4th Irish Film & Television Awards the ceremonies have generally been held the following year. As there was no ceremony in 2019, the 16th Irish Film & Television Awards covered a period of two years.

Table key
| ‡ | Indicates the winner |

=== 2000s ===
| Year | Actor | Programme | Ref. |
|---|---|---|---|
| 2003 (1st) | James Nesbitt ‡ | Murphy's Law | |
| 2003 (1st) | Peadar Cox | Ros na Rún | |
| 2003 (1st) | Simon Delaney | Bachelors Walk | |
| 2003 (1st) | Ciarán McMenamin | Any Time Now | |
| 2004 (2nd) | Ciarán Hinds ‡ | The Mayor of Casterbridge | |
| 2004 (2nd) | Simon Delaney | Pulling Moves | |
| 2004 (2nd) | Dylan Moran | Black Books | |
| 2004 (2nd) | James Nesbitt | Wall of Silence | |
| 2004 (2nd) | David Wilmot | The Clinic | |
| 2005 (3rd) | Tom Murphy ‡ | Pure Mule | |
| 2005 (3rd) | Allen Leech | Love is the Drug | |
| 2005 (3rd) | Finbar Lynch | Proof | |
| 2005 (3rd) | James Nesbitt | Murphy's Law | |
| 2006 (4th) | Ciarán Hinds ‡ | Rome | |
| 2006 (4th) | Liam Cunningham | Showbands | |
| 2006 (4th) | Michael McElhatton | Hide & Seek | |
| 2006 (4th) | James Nesbitt | Murphy's Law | |
| 2007 (5th) | Jonathan Rhys Meyers ‡ | The Tudors | |
| 2007 (5th) | Denis Conway | The Running Mate | |
| 2007 (5th) | Michael Gambon | Celebration | |
| 2007 (5th) | Don Wycherley | The Running Mate | |
| 2008 (6th) | Aidan Gillen ‡ | The Wire | |
| 2008 (6th) | Dominic Mafham | The Clinic | |
| 2008 (6th) | Jonathan Rhys Meyers | The Tudors | |
| 2008 (6th) | Stanley Townsend | Whistleblower | |
| 2009 (7th) | Brendan Gleeson ‡ | Into the Storm | |
| 2009 (7th) | Gabriel Byrne | In Treatment | |
| 2009 (7th) | Liam Neeson | Five Minutes of Heaven | |
| 2009 (7th) | Jonathan Rhys Meyers | The Tudors | |

=== 2010s ===
| Year | Actor | Programme | Ref. |
|---|---|---|---|
| 2010 (8th) | Domhnall Gleeson ‡ | When Harvey Met Bob | |
| 2010 (8th) | Owen McDonnell | Single-Handed | |
| 2010 (8th) | Jonathan Rhys Meyers | The Tudors | |
| 2010 (8th) | Robert Sheehan | Love/Hate | |
| 2011 (9th) | Aidan Gillen ‡ | Love/Hate | |
| 2011 (9th) | Diarmuid de Faoite | Corp + Anam | |
| 2011 (9th) | Chris O'Dowd | The Crimson Petal and the White | |
| 2011 (9th) | David Pearse | Trivia | |
| 2012 (10th) | Tom Vaughan-Lawlor ‡ | Love/Hate | |
| 2012 (10th) | Gabriel Byrne | Secret State | |
| 2012 (10th) | Colm Meaney | Hell on Wheels | |
| 2012 (10th) | Robert Sheehan | Love/Hate | |
| 2013 (11th) | Jamie Dornan ‡ | The Fall | |
| 2013 (11th) | Gabriel Byrne | Quirke | |
| 2013 (11th) | Chris O'Dowd | Moone Boy | |
| 2013 (11th) | Tom Vaughan-Lawlor | Love/Hate | |
| 2014 (12th) | Aidan Gillen ‡ | Charlie | |
| 2014 (12th) | Jamie Dornan | The Fall | |
| 2014 (12th) | Cillian Murphy | Peaky Blinders | |
| 2014 (12th) | Tom Vaughan-Lawlor | Love/Hate | |
| 2015 (13th) | Dara Devaney ‡ | An Klondike | |
| 2015 (13th) | Colin Farrell | True Detective | |
| 2015 (13th) | Stephen Rea | Dickensian | |
| 2015 (13th) | Aidan Turner | Poldark | |
| 2015 (13th) | Barry Ward | Rebellion | |
| 2016 (14th) | Cillian Murphy ‡ | Peaky Blinders | |
| 2016 (14th) | Dara Devaney | An Klondike | |
| 2016 (14th) | James Nesbitt | The Secret | |
| 2016 (14th) | Aidan Turner | Poldark | |
| 2016 (14th) | Tom Vaughan-Lawlor | Trial of the Century | |
| 2017 (15th) | Cillian Murphy ‡ | Peaky Blinders | |
| 2017 (15th) | Richard Dormer | Rellik | |
| 2017 (15th) | Adrian Dunbar | Line of Duty | |
| 2017 (15th) | Brendan Gleeson | Mr. Mercedes | |
| 2017 (15th) | Chris O'Dowd | Get Shorty | |
| 2018/19 (16th) | Andrew Scott ‡ | Black Mirror: Smithereens | |
| 2018/19 (16th) | Richard Dormer | Fortitude | |
| 2018/19 (16th) | Adrian Dunbar | Line of Duty | |
| 2018/19 (16th) | Brendan Gleeson | Mr. Mercedes | |
| 2018/19 (16th) | Cillian Murphy | Peaky Blinders | |
| 2018/19 (16th) | Chris O'Dowd | Get Shorty | |

=== 2020s ===
| Year | Actor | Programme | Ref. |
|---|---|---|---|
| 2020/21 (17th) | Paul Mescal ‡ | Normal People | |
| 2020/21 (17th) | Adrian Dunbar | Line of Duty | |
| 2020/21 (17th) | Brendan Gleeson | The Comey Rule | |
| 2020/21 (17th) | James Nesbitt | Bloodlands | |
| 2020/21 (17th) | Michael Smiley | Dead Still | |
| 2021/22 (18th) | Sam Keeley ‡ | Kin | |
| 2021/22 (18th) | Liam Cunningham | Domina | |
| 2021/22 (18th) | Aidan Gillen | Kin | |
| 2021/22 (18th) | James Nesbitt | Stay Close | |
| 2022/23 (19th) | Stephen Rea ‡ | The English | |
| 2022/23 (19th) | Conleth Hill | Holding | |
| 2022/23 (19th) | Kerr Logan | North Sea Connection | |
| 2022/23 (19th) | Vinnie McCabe | The Noble Call | |
| 2022/23 (19th) | Jason O'Mara | Smother | |
| 2022/23 (19th) | Aidan Turner | The Suspect | |
| 2023 (20th) | Éanna Hardwicke ‡ | The Sixth Commandment | |
| 2023 (20th) | Sam Keeley | Kin | |
| 2023 (20th) | Francis Magee | Kin | |
| 2023 (20th) | Martin McCann | Blue Lights | |
| 2023 (20th) | Daryl McCormack | The Woman in the Wall | |
| 2023 (20th) | Michael Smiley | Obituary | |
| 2024 (21st) | Colin Farrell ‡ | The Penguin | |
| 2024 (21st) | Anthony Boyle | Say Nothing | |
| 2024 (21st) | Michael Fassbender | The Agency | |
| 2024 (21st) | Ciarán Hinds | The Dry | |
| 2024 (21st) | Andrew Scott | Ripley | |
| 2024 (21st) | Aidan Turner | Rivals | |
| 2025 (22d) | Anthony Boyle ‡ | House of Guinness | |
| 2025 (22d) | Pierce Brosnan | MobLand | |
| 2025 (22d) | Domhnall Gleeson | The Paper | |
| 2025 (22d) | Martin McCann | Blue Lights | |
| 2025 (22d) | Aaron Monaghan | Hidden Assets | |
| 2025 (22d) | Alex Murphy | The Young Offenders | |

== Multiple awards and nominations ==
The following individuals have received two or more Lead Actor awards:

| Wins | Actor | Nominations |
|---|---|---|
| 3 | Aidan Gillen | 4 |
| 2 | Cillian Murphy | 4 |
| 2 | Ciarán Hinds | 3 |

The following individuals have received two or more Lead Actor nominations:

| Nominations | Actor |
|---|---|
| 7 | David Nesbitt |
| 4 | Aidan Gillen |
| 4 | Brendan Gleeson |
| 4 | Cillian Murphy |
| 4 | Chris O'Dowd |
| 4 | Jonathan Rhys Meyers |
| 4 | Aidan Turner |
| 4 | Tom Vaughan-Lawlor |
| 3 | Gabriel Byrne |
| 3 | Adrian Dunbar |
| 3 | Ciarán Hinds |
| 2 | Anthony Boyle |
| 2 | Liam Cunningham |
| 2 | Simon Delaney |
| 2 | Dara Devaney |
| 2 | Richard Dormer |
| 2 | Jamie Dornan |
| 2 | Colin Farrell |
| 2 | Domhnall Gleeson |
| 2 | Sam Keeley |
| 2 | Martin McCann |
| 2 | Stephen Rea |
| 2 | Andrew Scott |
| 2 | Robert Sheehan |
| 2 | Michael Smiley |
