= Shadows in the Sun (2009 film) =

- Directed by: David Rocksavage
- Written by: David Rocksavage
- Screenplay by: Margaret Glover; David Rocksavage
- Produced by: Nick O'Hagan
- Starring: Jean Simmons; James Wilby; Ophelia Lovibond; Jamie Dornan
- Music by: Richard Chester
- Release date: 5 June 2009
- Running time: 81 minutes
- Country: United Kingdom
- Language: English

Shadows in the Sun is a 2009 British independent film directed by David Rocksavage and starring James Wilby, Jean Simmons, Jamie Dornan and Ophelia Lovibond.

== Plot ==
A mysterious stranger brings together a family that has lost its way.

Hannah (Jean Simmons) is suffering from a chronic illness, smoking cannabis for respite, and has formed an unlikely friendship with a much younger man, Joe (Jamie Dornan). She lives perfectly happily with her poetry, garden and friend Joe but when Hannah's son Robert (James Wilby) arrives with his teenage daughter Kate (Ophelia Lovibond) and younger son, Sam (Toby Marlow), he is discomfited by his mother's arrangements.

== Production ==
Set in the coastal region of north Norfolk the film saw the return of Jean Simmons to the screen after a decade away. It was her last film. The film is set in the 1960s and made use of locations at Walsingham, Holkham and Brancaster.

Poetry extracts heard in the film include The Rubaiyat of Omar Khayyam from a translation by Edward FitzGerald, The Character of a Happy Life by Henry Wotton, W. B. Yeats, When You Are Old, and Variations by Conrad Aiken.
