= List of The Fall characters =

The Fall, starring Gillian Anderson, is a British-Irish drama series produced by Artists Studio and created by Allan Cubitt. It premiered in the Republic of Ireland at 21:30 on 12 May 2013, and in the UK on BBC Two at 21:00 on 13 May 2013. The series features Jamie Dornan, with John Lynch, Bronagh Waugh, Stuart Graham, and Niamh McGrady.

Cubitt was inspired by guitar manufacturing companies when naming some of his characters; both Stella and Gibson are brands of guitar, as are Benedetto, Brawley, Breedlove, Burns, Eastwood, Hagstrom, James Olson, James Tyler, Kay, Martin, Music Man, Paul Reed Smith, Rick Turner, Spector, Stagg, Terry McInturff, and Tom Anderson.

== Cast overview ==
Actor	Character	Series		
Actor	Character	1	2	3
Gillian Anderson	DSU Stella Gibson	Main	Main	Main
Jamie Dornan	Paul Spector	Main	Main	Main
John Lynch	ACC Jim Burns	Main	Main	Main
Aisling Franciosi	Katie Benedetto	Recurring	Main	Main
Bronagh Waugh	Sally Ann Spector	Main	Main	Main
Niamh McGrady	PC Danielle Ferrington	Main	Main	Recurring
Gerard Jordan	PC Brian Stone	Recurring	Recurring	
Stuart Graham	DCI Matthew Eastwood	Main	Main	Recurring
Bronágh Taggart	DC Gail McNally		Main	Recurring
Valene Kane	Rose Stagg	Recurring	Main	Main
Emmett J. Scanlan	DC Glen Martin	Recurring	Recurring	Recurring
Archie Panjabi	Prof Reed Smith	Main	Main	
Richard Clements	DC Rick Turner		Recurring	Main
Colin Morgan	DS Tom Anderson		Main	Main
Karen Hassan	Annie Brawley	Recurring	Main	Recurring
Jonjo O'Neill	Tom Stagg		Main	Main
Nick Lee	Ned Callan	Recurring	Main	
Brian Milligan	James Tyler	Recurring	Main	
Séainín Brennan	Elizabeth Tyler	Recurring	Main	
Ben Peel	DS James Olson	Main	Recurring	
Ian McElhinney	Morgan Monroe	Main	Recurring	
Aidan McArdle	Sean Healy			Main
Ruth Bradley	Louise Wallace			Main
Michael McElhatton	DI Rob Breedlove	Main		
Frank McCusker	DCI Garrett Brink	Main		
Aisling Bea	Kiera Sheridan			Main
Barry Ward	Dr Patrick Spencer			Main
Krister Henriksson	Dr August Larson			Main
Laura Donnelly	Sarah Kay	Main		
Richard Coyle	Dr Joe O'Donnell			Main
Denise Gough	Dr Alison Walden			Main
Seán McGinley	Fr Peter Jensen		Main	
Genevieve O'Reilly	DCI Joan Kinkead			Main
Martin McCann	David Alvarez			Main

== Main characters ==
=== Det. Supt. Stella Gibson ===
DSI Stella Gibson (Gillian Anderson), is a senior Metropolitan Police Superintendent attached to Britain's major case review team. Gibson has been seconded to the PSNI on a 28-day review of a murder investigation that quickly escalates into a hunt for a serial killer and she's made the Senior Investigating Officer (and Silver Commander) of Operation Musicman. Gibson is a very capable detective and a woman who is highly comfortable with her sexuality; this plays a pivotal role in her story arc with other characters, primarily James Olson and Jim Burns. Whilst working in Belfast, she becomes embroiled in the politics of policing and uncovers corruption within the force. In the second series, with her investigation stalled, Gibson is forced to get results under the threat of a new 28-day review into Operation Musicman. As Stella's past comes back to haunt her, her professional present becomes further tangled in it. Stella has what Paul describes as "daddy-issues", due to her father's untimely death. During series three, Gibson is placed under investigation by the Police Ombudsman following the shooting of Spector. Burns allows her to retain her job, which leads her to fall victim to a vicious assault during her final showdown with the killer.

=== Peter Paul Spector ===
Dornan as Paul Spector

Peter Paul Spector (Jamie Dornan), the father of two young children. During the day, Paul is a bereavement counsellor, though at night he is, as dubbed by the press, the "Belfast Strangler". As Paul hunts his prey, he begins to develop an obsession with, and an affinity for, Stella. He is married to Sally Ann, a neo-natal nurse, and has a strong friendship with Katie Benedetto. Spector claims that he had an affair with Katie, a fifteen-year-old school girl, to quell the suspicions of his wife. Sally Ann later becomes pregnant and the first series ends with Paul fleeing Ireland for Scotland as the net closes in. In series 2, returning to Ireland, Spector's lust to kill is now stronger than ever. As he gets closer to Stella, he finds an unusual source of help in Katie. After an encounter with James Tyler, Spector is arrested and, co-operating with officers, is shot by Tyler at a crime scene. Surviving his injuries, Spector presents as having lost six years of memory. After undergoing psychological evaluation, he attacks Gibson and his psychiatrist, before committing suicide.

=== Asst. Ch. Constable Jim Burns ===
ACC Jim Burns (John Lynch), the Assistant Chief Constable of the PSNI in charge of operations and the Gold Commander of Musicman. Burns had an affair with Stella several years previously and despite being married, still appears to be infatuated with her. He's a skilled officer and knows how to balance politics and police-work. He is initially hesitant about linking the murders but later provides the investigation with all the resources it requires. He is, at first, believed to be linked to the PSNI corruption scandal, though this is later disproved. During series 2, his lust for Stella becomes more apparent when he attempts to force himself on her whilst drunk. This drinking continues into series three and he resigns his commission during the series finale.

=== Katie Benedetto ===
Katerina "Katie" Benedetto (Aisling Franciosi), a 15-year-old schoolgirl. She babysits the Spectors' children and - over the course of doing so - develops an affinity for Paul Spector. Katie is a gifted musician and uses online videos to express her feelings. During series 2 she becomes deeply embroiled in Paul's life. Paul ties her up in a hotel room, for example, whilst Katie breaks into a house wearing a shirt with Spector's face on. Benedetto is placed under police surveillance and later arrested whilst trying to dispose of evidence that implicates Paul in the murders.

In series three, Katie has been released on police bail. Amid the media coverage of the arrest and trial of the Belfast Strangler, Katie's obsession with Paul Spector continues to grow, and she becomes distant from her family and friends. Katie becomes increasingly rebellious by playing truant from school, performing a septum piercing on herself and running away from home after an argument with her mother. Then she tracks down her former friend Daisy Drake outside a nightclub and, as instructed to by Spector in series 2, she sprays a corrosive substance (lemon juice) in the other girl's eyes. She attempts to visit Spector in hospital on more than one occasion, but is recognised by PC Angstrom, the officer who arrested her in series 2 and now has the duty of guarding Spector. She asks Sean Healey to pass on a letter to Spector, but he refuses. On her second visit to the hospital, she is arrested for breaching her bail conditions and is remanded in a youth detention facility. Katie is put on trial for the assault on Daisy Drake, but at the plea hearing she is abusive and makes threats towards the judge, and she has to be removed from the courtroom. During this time, she is visited by Stella at the juvenile detention facility and reveals to Stella that her father's death had a severe emotional impact on her, and she has been self-harming. Stella reveals that she also used to cut herself, and tries to convince Katie not to further ruin her own life in an attempt to impress Spector, who doesn't know or care that she exists. Stella seems to be the only one who can get through to Katie.

=== Sally Ann Spector ===
Sally Ann Spector (née Goodall) (Bronagh Waugh), the wife of Paul Spector and a neonatal nurse. She has a deep devotion to Paul, but is wary of his character as she has never met his family. Sally Ann is the mother of his two children and is unaware of his dark side. Over the course of the series, she becomes embroiled in his crimes without her knowledge by providing a false alibi to the police. After leaving Paul for a short time, believing he slept with Katie, the two reconcile and she flees Ireland with him. In series 2, they return. Sally Ann is pregnant with their third child, though she suffers a miscarriage. Following her arrest for assisting an offender, Sally attempts to kill her children, who are subsequently placed with foster parents. No information is given about the result of the charges that had been brought against her.

=== PC Danielle Ferrington ===
PC Danielle Ferrington (Niamh McGrady), a police constable first seen attending a breaking and entering call at Sarah Kay's home. She blames herself for Kay's murder and tells Gibson this, resulting in her being recruited by Gibson to work with Operation Musicman. Ferrington is a skilled investigator, and proves herself invaluable to the team. She speaks openly of her homosexuality to bisexual Gibson, and as a result the two develop both a professional and a personal bond. She later returns to patrol, believing she can do the most good on the street. It is in this capacity that she is involved in a gunfight with Spector and, following her suspension from front-line duty, is re-recruited by Gibson.

=== Det. Ch. Insp. Matthew Eastwood ===
DCI Matthew Eastwood (Stuart Graham), a senior detective chief inspector and longtime PSNI officer. Eastwood works for the Discipline and Complaints Commission and, as such, his character withstands the scrutiny of others. His primary task is to investigate corruption allegations within the PSNI. He and Stella work together several times due to her involvement with Olson and Breedlove. As well as being a corruption investigator, he is also trained in criminal investigations. During series 2, he becomes Gibson's deputy, questioning many of her investigative decisions.

=== DC Gail McNally ===
DC Gail McNally (Bronágh Taggart), a detective who was assigned to Musicman sometime prior to the second series. She is Martin's partner. Tough, eager, and skilled, McNally is not afraid to confront criminals in the same manner as her male colleagues. Gibson relies on her heavily during the investigative process.

=== Rose Stagg ===
Rose Veronica Stagg (née McGill) (Valene Kane), a woman who had a sexual relationship with Paul whilst at university. During a night of passion, Paul tried to strangle her to death. As the Belfast Strangler comes to the attention of the public, Stagg notices the similarities and contacts her close friend Reed Smith. Her husband was unaware the attack had taken place. She is later kidnapped and held captive by Spector. She is later found unconscious in a car boot. During series three, Stagg reveals that her sexual relationship with Paul was entirely consensual and that during sex he strangled her so much that she had to be revived.

=== DC Glen Martin ===
DC Glen Martin (Emmett Scanlan), a capable detective with a somewhat boyish attitude towards his work. Martin is an invaluable member of Gibson's team and in series two, takes on a more prominent role. He is partnered with DC Gail McNally and is fiercely protective of her, though not to a fault. Stella is often shown to be displeased at his attitude towards police work and in particular his habit of eating whilst on duty.

=== Professor Reed Smith ===
Professor Reed Smith (Archie Panjabi), an esteemed medical professional and the senior pathologist assigned to Musicman. An avid rider of motorcycles, and somewhat unconventional in manner, Smith develops a personal closeness to Gibson and the two confide in each-other regularly. She's very professional, though her personal life later becomes embroiled in the case when an old friend of hers reveals she has had a sexual encounter with Spector. Whilst drinking with Stella, the two embrace in a kiss, and go back to Stella's hotel room, though Reed later gets cold feet.

=== DC Rick Turner ===
Rick Turner (Richard Clements), a Detective Constable.

=== Det. Sgt. Tom Anderson ===
DS Tom Anderson (Colin Morgan), the Senior Investigating Officer of a death that could be linked to Stella's investigation. Impressed with both his professional attitude and looks, Stella invites him to join her team. Seeing the parallels between Anderson and Spector, Stella allows him to conduct the arrest and interviews of Paul. He is later shot by James Tyler whilst cuffed to the serial killer and suffers nerve damage as a result. After returning to duty, Anderson is once again attacked by Spector whilst protecting Stella in an interview.

=== Annie Brawley ===
Ann ‘Annie’ Brawley (Karen Hassan), a woman who is recovering after a botched home invasion by Spector in which she was strangled and her brother was murdered. She is suffering from memory loss and unable to identify her attacker. In Series 2, Spector is unwittingly approached by the Alice Parker Monroe Foundation to provide Annie with grief counselling. Spector immediately seizes the opportunity to manipulate his way into her life.

=== Tom Stagg ===
Tom Stagg (Jonjo O'Neill), Rose Stagg's husband and a close friend of Professor Reed Smith. He is unaware of his wife's past relationship with Paul, and is at first ignorant to her involvement in the current case. Like Spector, he is the father of two children. He is particularly hurt when his wife goes missing, and is the first one to raise the alarm to Gibson and her team.

=== Ned Callan ===
Ned Callan (Nick Lee), a journalist with a keen interest in Gibson's investigation. He's intrepid, but does not always understand the boundaries placed upon him by the law.

=== James Tyler ===
James 'Jimmy' Tyler (Brian Milligan), a gangster whose son died as a child of meningitis. Tyler is part of the gang that are responsible for the death of DS Olson, and his gang ties allow him to become threatening towards Paul when he believes Spector slept with his wife. Following a confrontation in which Ferrington is shot at, Tyler hunts down Spector and shoots both him and Anderson. He is killed by officers including Hagstrom as a result of this.

=== Elizabeth Tyler ===
Elizabeth ‘Liz’ Tyler (Séainín Brennan), a grieving mother who was counselled by Spector following the death of her young son. Tyler develops a close friendship with Paul, and as a result the killer appears to put himself at great personal risk in order to protect her. Following a violent confrontation with her husband, Liz is placed in a half way house for her own protection. Feeling unattractive, she lied, stating that Spector had had sex with her, and as a result Jimmy tracks her down, beats her, and goes on to shoot Paul and Tom Anderson.

=== Det. Sgt. James Olson ===
DS James Olson (Ben Peel), a young Sergeant who is first seen investigating an unrelated murder. Gibson invites him to her hotel room, and two engage in sexual activity. Following this, Olson begins to call Gibson, intimating he wants more than a one-night stand with her. After she rejects him, he is gunned down by unknown gang members. At the time of his death, he was married with two children. He is later linked to part of a wider corruption scandal within the PSNI. Following his death, Stella begins to see him in her dreams, implying his murder had a huge psychological impact on her. During series three, it is noted that his murder remains unsolved.

=== Morgan Monroe ===
Morgan Monroe (Ian McElhinney), the Chairman of the PSNI oversight executive board. Monroe wields great control over the police force and, in particular, Jim Burns. He is of questionable character, both personally and professionally. Morgan is the father-in-law of one of Spector's victims, though he initially believes his own son, Aaron, to be responsible for the murder. He is linked to the PSNI corruption scandal that Stella uncovers over the course of her investigation. He later sends Aaron away from Belfast after the corruption scandal intensifies and remains as chairman, later threatening Stella with a new 28-day review into her own investigation. During series two, Burns mentions that Aaron returned to Belfast and tried to kill Morgan but failed. During series three, he is no longer the incumbent chairman: his departure remains unexplained.

=== Sean Healy ===
Sean Healy (Aidan McArdle), Spector's solicitor. He is retained by Sally Ann, and continues to strongly advocate for Spector's freedom at the possible cost of Gibson's career.

=== Louise Wallace ===
Louise Wallace (Ruth Bradley), Spector's solicitor. Though initially showing a strong support for Healy's desire to free Spector, she later changes her position following his attack on Gibson. She also realises that her desire to do the right thing means she cannot advocate for the criminal.

=== Det. Insp. Rob Breedlove ===
DI Rob Breedlove (Michael McElhatton), Sergeant James Olson's partner. Breedlove finds himself caught up in the gangland violence of Northern Ireland and, as a result, begins moonlighting for a Belfast power broker. Corrupt, Breedlove first crosses paths with Stella following Olson's death. After being confronted by Stella, Breedlove turns a gun on himself and commits suicide in the middle of the Police Station. His death marks the beginning of Gibson's quest to uncover the corruption.

=== Det. Ch. Insp. Garrett Brink ===
DCI Garrett Brink (Frank McCusker), a veteran Detective Chief Inspector and, originally, the internal reviewer of Gibson's investigation. After failing to make any progress in his review, he is subjected to a 28-day review and subsequently becomes Gibson's deputy SIO (and Bronze Commander) during Musicman. He's a dedicated professional, but is more concerned with the politics of policing than with policing itself. Shortly after the first series, he is called to trial and as such steps down as Gibson's number two.

=== Kiera Sheridan ===
Kiera Sheridan (Aisling Bea), an Intensive Care Nurse employed by Belfast General Hospital. During series three, she is responsible for the treatment of Spector. During series three, the two develop a bond, with Kiera giving Paul her phone number and a small amount of cash with writing on it. Following Paul's discharge from hospital, the two share no further communication.

=== Dr Patrick Spencer ===
Dr Patrick Spencer (Barry Ward), an Intensive Care Unit consultant working at Belfast General Hospital.

=== Dr August Larson ===
Dr August Larson (Krister Henriksson), a psychologist retained by the PSNI to examine Spector's competency. Through his time with Spector, Larson also develops a strong friendship with Gibson, examining her psychology via various phone-calls and procedural meetings. In the finale, he is attacked by Spector, though it is later stated that he is in critical-yet-stable condition.

=== Sarah Kay ===
Sarah Kay (Laura Donnelly), a young solicitor who is brought to the attention of Ferrington after a burglary. Kay decides to stay at her house, not anticipating that the culprit, Spector, would return. She is later found murdered; Ferrington blames herself for this but it is her death that allows Stella to link the crimes and establish Musicman.

=== Dr Joe O'Donnell ===
Dr Joe O'Donnell (Richard Coyle), an emergency medical physician who is responsible for the immediate treatment and oversight of Spector. Following Spector's discharge, O'Donnell shares a tender moment with Gibson, in which he asks her numerous questions to assess her for concussion. He reveals he has five children, aged between seven months and twelve years old.

=== Dr Alison Walden ===
Dr Alison Walden (Denise Gough), a consultant neuropsychologist who works with Spector.

=== Peter Jensen ===
Father Peter Jensen (Seán McGinley) is a paedophile priest who used to run Gortnacul, one of the children's homes that Paul Spector was sent to after his mother committed suicide. Jensen was convicted of sexually abusing the boys placed in his care and was sentenced to prison. Jim Burns was the arresting officer. During the investigation, Gibson discovers that Spector had been at Gortnacul and Burns goes to interview Jensen in prison to gather background information on the killer. Jensen is unrepentant and believes he was doing God's work by getting the boys to "explore their sexuality", claiming that they all consented. Despite being defrocked, Jensen continues to act as a priest behind bars and refuses to co-operate with Burns' questioning unless he is addressed as "Father". In series two, Jensen claims that he did not molest Paul, with Paul later clarifying that this was only because he didn't wash himself, with the goal of repulsing Peter. In series three it is suggested that this is a lie and that Paul was Jensen's "favourite", subjected to daily abuse for a year.

=== Det. Ch. Insp. Joan Kinkead ===
Joan Kinkead (Genevieve O'Reilly), a Detective Chief Inspector, and the senior investigating officer assigned to examine Spector's shooting. She interviews Gibson under caution, though she later clears her of all wrongdoing.

=== David Alvarez ===
David Alvarez (Martin McCann), a childhood friend of Spector.
