= Jamie Dornan =

Actor from Northern Ireland (born 1982)

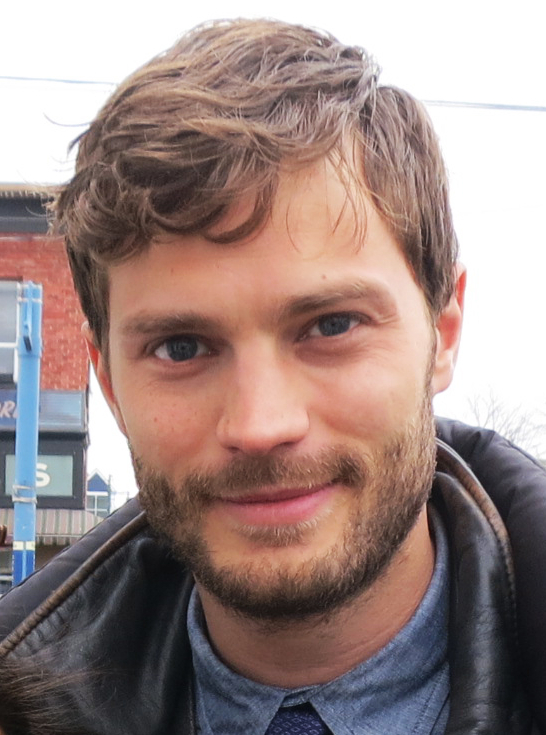
- Dornan in 2013
- Born: James Peter Maxwell Dornan; 1 May 1982 (age 44); Holywood, County Down, Northern Ireland
- Education: Methodist College Belfast; Teesside University (dropped out)
- Occupations: Actor; model
- Years active: 2001–present
- Works: Full list
- Spouse: Amelia Warner (m. 2013)
- Children: 3
- Father: Jim Dornan
- Awards: Full list

James Peter Maxwell Dornan (/ˈdʒeɪmi ˈdɔːrnən/; born 1 May 1982) is an actor and model from Northern Ireland. His accolades include two Irish Film and Television Awards, in addition to nominations for a BAFTA Television Award and a Golden Globe Award. He has been ranked as one of the "25 Biggest Male Models of All Time" by Vogue, as well as named one of Ireland's greatest film actors by The Irish Times.

Dornan began his career as a model, appearing in campaigns for Hugo Boss, Dior Homme, and Calvin Klein. He transitioned to acting with a role in Sofia Coppola's drama film Marie Antoinette (2006). His breakthrough came as the Huntsman / Sheriff Graham Humbert in the fantasy series Once Upon a Time (2011–2013) and as serial killer Paul Spector in the crime drama series The Fall (2013–2016); the latter earned him critical praise and a nomination for the British Academy Television Award for Best Actor.

Dornan achieved wider recognition for portraying Christian Grey in the Fifty Shades franchise (2015–2018), which collectively grossed over $1.3 billion worldwide. His other film credits include Anthropoid (2016), The Siege of Jadotville (2017), Barb and Star Go to Vista Del Mar (2021), and Belfast (2021); the latter earned him a nomination for the Golden Globe Award for Best Supporting Actor. He has since starred in the thriller drama series The Tourist (2022–2024). He is set to star in the upcoming film The Lord of the Rings: The Hunt for Gollum (2027).

As a musician, Dornan performed in the folk band Sons of Jim and contributed to the soundtracks of Fifty Shades Freed (2018), Wild Mountain Thyme (2020), and Barb and Star Go to Vista Del Mar.

== Early life ==
James Peter Maxwell Dornan was born on 1 May 1982 in Holywood, County Down, Northern Ireland, and grew up in the suburbs of Belfast. He has two older sisters. He is a first cousin, twice removed, of actress Greer Garson. His grandparents on both sides of his family were Methodist lay preachers. His mother, Lorna, died of pancreatic cancer when he was 16. His father Jim Dornan, an obstetrician and gynaecologist who had also considered becoming an actor, died of complications related to COVID-19 on 15 March 2021. Dornan has echoed his father's support throughout his career, stating: "Some people go their whole lives without being told, 'You've made your parents proud'. My dad would tell me every day."

He attended, and boarded, at Methodist College Belfast, where he played rugby and participated in the drama department. In school, he appeared in a Christmas pantomime portraying Widow Twankey which earned him his first drama prize. He also played Baby Face in Bugsy Malone and the milkman in Blood Brothers in school productions. He was a member of Belfast's youth amateur drama group, Holywood Players, and participated in the Ballymoney Drama Festival with this group on several occasions. He played rugby as a winger for the Belfast Harlequins and also for Ulster Rugby under-21 team. Dornan said that he could have played professionally if not for a foot and mouth viral infection that broke out during his time on the under-21 team.

He attended Teesside University before dropping out and moving to London in 2002 to train as an actor. He never applied to drama school, and worked in a pub in Knightsbridge for six months until he embarked on his modelling career.

== Early work ==
=== Music ===
Dornan performed in the folk band Sons of Jim until it disbanded in 2008. He founded the band with his schoolmate David Alexander and formed their own record label Doorstep Records under which they published their songs "Fairytale" and "My Burning Sun". Sons of Jim supported Scottish singer-songwriter KT Tunstall on tour.

=== Modeling ===
After dropping out of university, in 2001 Dornan took part in the Channel 4 reality show Model Behaviour. He was eliminated, but signed a modeling contract with Select Model Management. Dornan was not keen to pursue modeling as a career, but was persuaded by his sisters. In 2003, he modeled for Abercrombie & Fitch with Malin Åkerman. He then modeling for Aquascutum, Hugo Boss, and Armani. In 2005, he became the face of Dior Homme's fragrance advertising campaign. Dornan's first appearance in Calvin Klein's advertising campaign was in 2004 with Russian model Natalia Vodianova. His later notable works for the brand include the jeans advertising campaigns with Kate Moss in 2006 and with Eva Mendes in 2010. In 2009, he was made the face of Calvin Klein's 'CK Free' fragrance and also appeared as a judge in its model hunt competition, Nine countries, nine men, one winner that year. In 2006, he was labelled "The Golden Torso" by The New York Times and was dubbed the "male Kate Moss" by GQ's creative director Jim Moore.

Dornan also appeared in commercials for Dolce & Gabbana, Zara, Banana Republic, and Levi's Jeans. In 2015 he was ranked one of the "25 Biggest Male Models of All Time" by Vogue. After his acting breakthrough, he became the new face of "Boss The Scent" for Hugo Boss in 2018 and starred in the Fall/Winter Men's Fashion Campaign for Spanish luxury fashion brand Loewe in 2023, also becoming their global brand ambassador the following year. During his career, he worked with fashion photographers Bruce Weber, Carter Smith, as well as designer Hedi Slimane. Dornan never participated in ramp walks because of his unconventional style of walking.

== Acting career ==
=== 2006–2012: Career beginnings ===
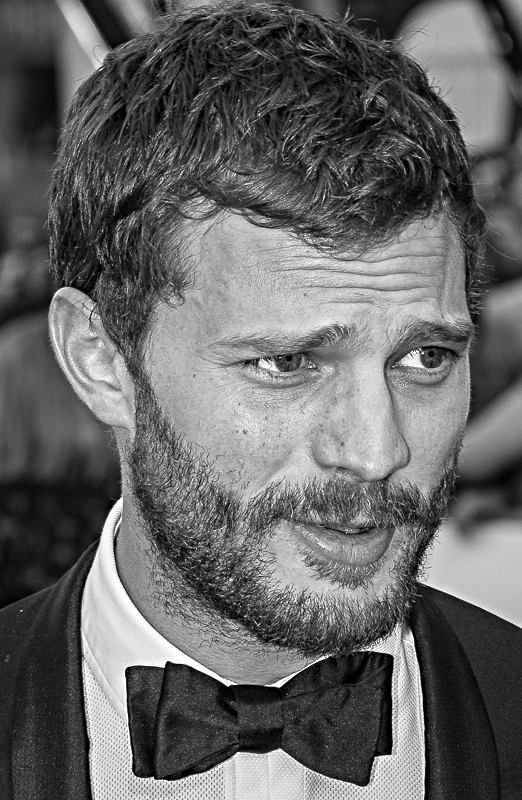
Dornan at the 2014 British Academy Television Awards, where he was nominated for his work on The Fall

Dornan's first acting role in a film was as Count Axel Fersen in the Sofia Coppola film Marie Antoinette (2006). Afterwards, he unsuccessfully auditioned for many roles while appearing in films Beyond the Rave (2008), Shadows in the Sun (2009). When asked if the transition into an acting career was problematic, Dornan stated that the "model turned actor" label held a significant stigma. He struggled with auditions and casting agents who treated him only as a model, but he had always wanted to act and so, auditioned in the pilot season in Los Angeles. Initially interested in comedy, he had meetings with Funny or Die, and wrote a comic blog for them that did not get published. He recalled: "I used to always want to do comedy, and then I just didn't. I ended up quite far away from that path."

Dornan appeared in nine episodes of the ABC fantasy television series Once Upon a Time between 2011 and 2013, playing the role of the Huntsman/Sheriff Graham. While Graham was killed by the town's mayor Regina/the Evil Queen in the episode "The Heart Is a Lonely Hunter", Dornan confirmed that he would return as the Huntsman from the Enchanted Forest at some point. He returned as the Huntsman for the season finale "A Land Without Magic", and later as Graham for the season two episode "Welcome to Storybrooke" in its flashback segment.

=== 2013–2015: Breakthrough with The Fall and Fifty Shades trilogy ===
Dornan's breakout role was alongside Gillian Anderson in the Northern Irish drama series The Fall, where he played Paul Spector, a serial killer terrorising Belfast. He initially auditioned for the role of a police officer, but was later called upon to audition for the lead role, for which he was eventually selected. He read books about serial killers and watched interviews of Ted Bundy to get an understanding of the mindset of his character, and stalked a woman in his preparation for the role. He wanted to play the character with "real stillness". Beginning in 2013, the show aired for three series ending in October 2016. Critic Ken Tucker opined that Dornan was "handsome and skilled". David Thomson of The New Republic complimented him on his performance: "Jamie Dornan as Paul, has become the center of the drama in a performance that unpeels as slowly as a stripper—and maybe as seductively." He won the Irish Film and Television Award for Best Lead Actor - TV Drama and was nominated for a British Academy Television Award for Best Actor. He has said The Fall changed his professional horizons. He later appeared in Flying Home (2014), a romantic drama film, and New Worlds (2015), a historical drama series.

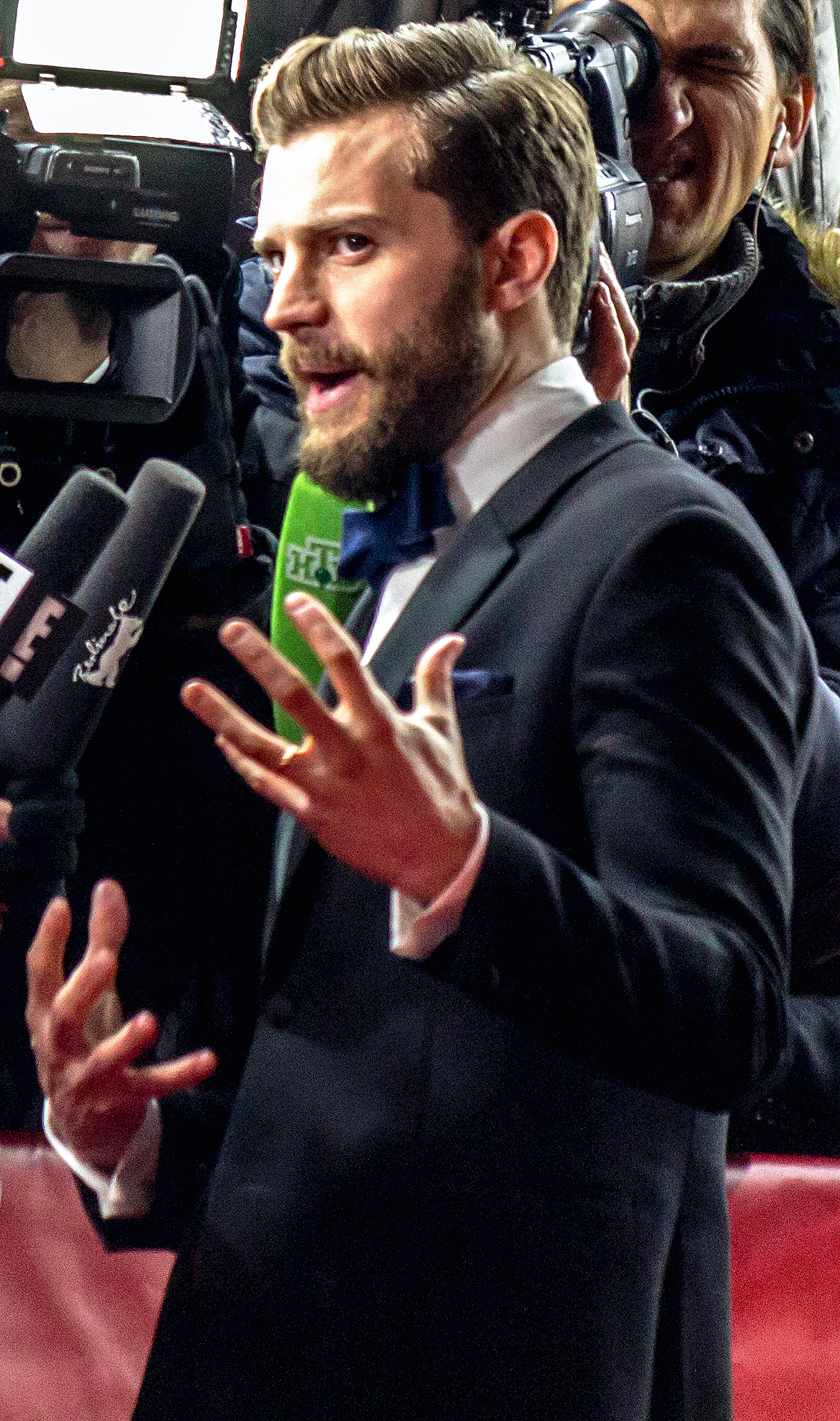
Dornan at the Berlinale premier of Fifty Shades of Grey in 2015, the film that catapulted him towards stardom

In 2013, Dornan was cast as Christian Grey in the film adaptation of Fifty Shades of Grey, replacing Charlie Hunnam. The film was released in February 2015, breaking box office records. He visited a private sex dungeon as preparation for playing his sadistic character. He reprised his role in the second and third installments of the Fifty Shades film franchise, Fifty Shades Darker (2017), and Fifty Shades Freed (2018). Earning approximately $1.32 billion, the franchise became the seventh highest-grossing R-rated franchise. Despite being a box office blockbuster, the trilogy was poorly received by critics, with Dornan's performance being critically panned. He later stated that initially he was reluctant about his involvement in the project and knew the franchise would not be treated well by critics. But he has said: "[...] it's given me so much beyond finance-wise, I mean that opportunity to then do the movies [...] movies like that have so much heart and mean so much to me. I would not have been given those opportunities if I hadn't done Fifty Shades."

=== 2016–2021: Transition to independent film roles and Belfast ===
In 2016, Dornan starred as Commandant Pat Quinlan, who led the Irish UN force during The Siege of Jadotville, in Netflix's war film The Siege of Jadotville. He was sent to a boot camp in South Africa with the rest of the cast to train for the film. The film was released at the Galway Film Festival 2016, receiving mixed reviews. Writing for The Irish Times, critic Donald Clarke took note of Dornan's "suave acting". He received a nomination for the Irish Film and Television Award for Best Actor − Film. His second screen appearance that year was as Jan Kubiš, alongside Cillian Murphy in another war film Anthropoid. Jan Kubiš was one of the Czech soldiers involved in Operation Anthropoid, the assassination of Reinhard Heydrich. Rupert Hawksley of The Daily Telegraph felt that he made a decent fist of portraying Kubiš and said: "Nazi nail-biter Anthropoid shows Jamie Dornan has many more than 50 shades". For the film, he received nominations for the British Independent Film Award and Czech Lion Award for Best Supporting Actor. He also appeared in a Miramax film titled The 9th Life of Louis Drax, a supernatural thriller based on a book of the same name, in 2016.

In 2018, Dornan co-starred alongside Peter Dinklage, as a journalist Danny Tate, in the HBO television film My Dinner with Hervé, written and directed by Sacha Gervasi. The film narrated a fictional take on Gervasi's interview with actor Hervé Villechaize in 1993, days before his suicide. Matthew Gilbert of The Boston Globe said: "The Danny plot is fine - nothing special really, although Dornan is excellent and manages to bring a good sense of transformation to an underwritten character". In the same year, Dornan portrayed photojournalist Paul Conroy in the biographical drama A Private War. Ann Hornaday, writing for The Washington Post, described Dornan's performance as "gallantly self-effacing". Kenneth Turan of Los Angeles Times thought it was an "excellent work from the Fifty Shades veteran". His other roles in 2018 include Will Scarlet in the action film Robin Hood, Liam Ward in the miniseries Death and Nightingales (reuniting with The Fall creator Allan Cubitt), and Nick, a doctor and memoirist, in the drama film Untogether, with each production, and Dornan's performance in them, receiving lukewarm reception.

In 2019, Dornan starred as a paramedic in the science fiction thriller film Synchronic. It had its world premiere at the 44th Toronto International Film Festival, receiving positive reviews from critics. His other role that year was of an Irish writer, Jack, in the semi-improvised romantic drama Endings, Beginnings.

Dornan then appeared in two comedy films, Wild Mountain Thyme (2020) and Barb and Star Go to Vista Del Mar (2021). Wild Mountain Thyme, John Patrick Shanley's film adaptation of his own play Outside Mullingar, was poorly received and was criticised for accent inaccuracy. Dornan starred as Anthony Reilly, a bashful farmer unable to confess his love for Rosemary Muldoon (Emily Blunt). While critic Christy Lemire praised his dramatic work but was less impressed by his attempt at physical comedy, Simran Hans of The Guardian described his performance as "a commendable feat of comic brilliance, not to be missed". Playing a "lovestruck henchman" Edgar in Barb and Star, he won plaudits from critics for his musical number and comedic turn. Writing for TheWrap, Alonso Duralde addressed his ballad as "a definite highlight" of the film and said: "While it's definitely [Annie] Mumolo and [Kristen] Wiig's show all the way, Dornan winds up being surprisingly capable at holding his own against these two dynamos".

In 2020, The Irish Times listed him at number 32 among the 50 greatest Irish film actors of all time.

"[...] he was a really natural leading man. He is not interested in those usual tics that can make up so many colourful, eye-catching parts."

— Branagh on Dornan's acting style

In 2021, Dornan portrayed a working class father in Kenneth Branagh's drama film Belfast, the character being based on Branagh's father. His performance received critical acclaim. Critic Peter Travers wrote on Good Morning America: "Dornan, free of the s&m sex trap of the 50 Shades of Grey trilogy, builds on his virtuoso turn on The Fall to show an actor of ferocity and feeling as he invests Pa, often absent from home for construction work in England, with simmering emotion and quiet strength". He received nominations for the Golden Globe Award and Critics' Choice Movie Award for Best Supporting Actor. The film was nominated for Best Picture at the 94th Academy Awards.

=== 2022–present: Career expansion ===
After Belfast, he played the lead role of Elliot Stanley/Eugene Cassidy, an amnesiac trying to learn about his past, in BBC thriller series The Tourist. Debuting on BBC iPlayer in January 2022, it became the most watched drama of that year in the UK. He himself and critics alike found his character challenging. In a review for The Guardian, TV critic Lucy Mangan highlighted Dornan's "compelling performance" and found him in "fine form". For his performance he received a nomination for the AACTA Award for Best Lead Actor in a Television Drama and was featured on the Radio Times's TV 100 power list in 2023. He reprised his role in the second series in 2024.

He returned to mainstream cinema in 2023, appearing in Netflix's poorly received action film Heart of Stone as an MI6 agent Parker, who was the antagonist of the film. That year also saw Dornan in his second collaboration with Kenneth Branagh in A Haunting in Venice (Branagh's third Hercule Poirot film), playing Dr. Leslie Ferrier who was suffering from post-traumatic stress disorder after serving as a military doctor in World War II. Compared to its predecessors, the film underperformed at the box office, but received a better critical reception. Helen O'Hara, reviewing the film for Empire, felt that his character was comparatively small, but said: "Dornan is suitably twitchy as a veteran with PTSD".

In 2024, he was announced the ambassador of Into Film for Northern Ireland.

In 2025, Dornan was also announced as part of the voice cast for the upcoming animated fantasy film The Turning Door, alongside Alicia Vikander, Jodie Turner-Smith, Bill Nighy, and Gillian Anderson.

Also in 2025, Dornan was announced as a brand ambassador for Diet Coke, featuring in an advertisement shot at Shepperton Open Water Swim in Surrey. He also starred in a promotional segment for Callaway Golf Europe’s “On the Course with…” programme.

In 2026, Dornan hosted the 2nd episode of SNL UK with musical guest Wolf Alice, performing "White Horses" and "Leaning Against The Wall".

Warner Bros. made an announcement at CinemaCon 2026, during a special presentation of its upcoming slate at Caesars Palace, Las Vegas NV, The Lord of the Rings: The Hunt for Gollum. The film is set to be released in theatres on the 17th of December 2027, placing Dornan as Strider, an alias for Aragorn (played by Viggo Mortensen in the original Lord of the Rings film trilogy).

In recently, Dornan starred and executive produced in the Apple TV heist thriller 12 12 12, and the Netflix thriller limited series The Twin, which will premiere on 13 November 2026 and 1 January 2027 respectively.

== Charitable work ==
Dornan has lent his support towards various means and organisations. He was the patron of TinyLife, a Northern Ireland charity for premature and vulnerable babies. In 2017, he participated in a charity football match, Game 4 Grenfell, to provide aid to the victims of Grenfell Tower fire in West London that year.

In 2018, Dornan became the patron of the newly established charity Northern Ireland Pancreatic Cancer (NIPanC) which was created in partnership with Pancreatic Cancer Action and the Pancreatic Cancer Research Fund. Due to busy filming schedule, he quit the role in 2021 but considered himself a strong supporter of it. In 2020, Dornan read a bedtime story as part of Save with Stories to raise funds for Save the Children's Emergency Coronavirus Appeal. In the same year, he supported the Faster 5K Friday campaign for the Care Workers Charity, which provides financial grants for care workers.

Dornan has appeared in annual fundraising events Red Nose Day by Comic Relief and Children in Need by BBC. He has also backed emergency campaigns providing help for children's treatment.

== Personal life and other ventures ==
In 2003, Dornan met actress Keira Knightley in an Asprey photoshoot. After being together for two years, they split up in 2005. He met English actress and singer-songwriter Amelia Warner in 2010, becoming engaged to her in 2012, and marrying in 2013. They have three daughters. Dornan is an atheist. In interviews he has said that he considers himself Irish.

He launched his menswear clothing line 'Eleven Eleven' in 2022.

=== Amateur golf ===
As an amateur, Dornan has competed in the pro–am event at the Alfred Dunhill Links Championship in 2014 (pairing with Danny Willett), 2015 (with Peter Uihlein), 2016 and 2017, both times pairing with Tyrrell Hatton. He also participated in the 2017 Irish Open with Justin Rose and the J. P. McManus Pro-Am in 2022.

== Acting credits and awards ==
Dornan's most acclaimed films include A Private War (2018), Belfast (2021), My Dinner with Hervé (2018), Barb and Star Go to Vista Del Mar (2021), Synchronic (2019), A Haunting in Venice (2023), Anthropoid (2016) and The Siege of Jadotville (2016). His critically lauded television works are The Tourist (2022–2024), The Fall (2013–2016) and Once Upon a Time (2011).

Dornan is the recipient of two Irish Film and Television Awards, a Broadcasting Press Guild Award and a People's Choice Award. He has been nominated for a British Academy Television Award and a Golden Globe Award.

Dornan received an honorary Doctor of Arts degree from the Queens University Belfast in 2023.

== Authored article ==
- Dornan, Jamie (7 April 2017). "The world just lost a lot of laughter". The Guardian.
