= Annie Mumolo =

American writer, comedian and actress

- Born: July 10, 1973 (age 53); Irvine, California, U.S.
- Other name: Anne Mumolo
- Education: University of California, Berkeley
- Occupations: Screenwriter, actress, comedian, producer
- Years active: 2003–present
- Known for: Co-writer of Bridesmaids
- Spouse: Tim Lovestedt (m. 2005; div. 2016)
- Children: 2

Annie Mumolo (born July 10, 1973) is an American screenwriter, actress, comedian, and producer. She is best known for co-writing the comedy film Bridesmaids with Kristen Wiig, for which she was nominated for an Academy Award and a BAFTA for Best Original Screenplay. She and Wiig then co-wrote, co-produced, and starred in Barb and Star Go to Vista Del Mar (2021). Mumolo also appeared in the films This Is 40 (2012), Afternoon Delight (2013), The Boss (2016), Bad Moms (2016), Queenpins (2020), and Confess, Fletch (2022).

== Early life ==
Mumolo was born in Irvine, California, to a dentist father and a homemaker mother, Alice. She is of Italian descent. Her grandfather, Dominic Mumolo, was a studio musician on staff at NBC from 1949 to 1971, where he played on The Dean Martin Show, Rowan & Martin's Laugh-In, The Andy Williams Show, and The Tonight Show. He also recorded with musicians including Frank Sinatra, Nat King Cole, and Nelson Riddle.

Mumolo graduated from Mater Dei High School in 1991 and the University of California, Berkeley, where she was a member of Chi Omega and received her B.A. in history in 1995.

== Career ==
Mumolo began her career as a member of the improvisational comedy troupe The Groundlings. She appeared in the 2005 comedy film Bewitched and television shows such as The Minor Accomplishments of Jackie Woodman, Out of Practice, and Two and a Half Men. She started voice acting in 2004 on the television series Maya & Miguel. She was an actress on Random! Cartoons, for the segments Hero Heights, Sparkles and Gloom, and Thom Cat. She appeared in two ABC pilots in 2009, Bad Mother's Handbook and This Might Hurt. She voiced Jimmy and Natalie in the cartoon short series Ape Escape on Nicktoons Network in 2007. In 2009, Mumolo wrote an episode of In the Motherhood titled "Where There's a Will, There's a Wake".

In 2011, Mumolo co-wrote Bridesmaids with fellow Groundlings performer Kristen Wiig, and also made a cameo appearance in it. The film was released that spring by Universal Pictures to critical acclaim, making US$167 million in North America and US$280 million worldwide. She received Academy Award for Best Writing (Original Screenplay), BAFTA Award for Best Original Screenplay and Writers Guild of America Award for Best Original Screenplay nominations. Following the success of Bridesmaids, Mumolo played a supporting role in the 2012 comedy film This Is 40, which was directed by Judd Apatow. In 2013, she appeared in Joey Soloway's comedy-drama film Afternoon Delight, and from 2014 to 2015 she was a regular cast member in the NBC comedy series About a Boy.

After Bridesmaids, Mumolo was fired as a writer for the 20th Century Fox biographical film Joy, which might have had Kristen Wiig star as Joy Mangano. After several changes made by director David O. Russell, she received only a "story by" credit. In a 2021 interview, Mumolo said "As a writer, you’re treated very differently than you are as an actor, in almost every way. I feel like it’s exponentially harder for that reason alone. The ‘Joy’ movie was a very heartbreaking experience for me, and I had to just sort of separate because of that aspect of things. When it was going in one direction, we got a phone call overnight that there's a change happening. And then I was asked to do things that were against my morality, and it was very difficult. When I didn't feel comfortable doing those things that were against my values, I was lambasted. I can't say too much. I guess probably because I was living in fear.”

In 2016, Mumolo appeared in the two comedy films. The first was The Boss starring Melissa McCarthy and directed by Ben Falcone, and the second was box-office hit Bad Moms alongside Mila Kunis, Kristen Bell, Kathryn Hahn, Jada Pinkett Smith, and Christina Applegate. In 2017, she co-wrote biographical drama film Megan Leavey directed by Gabriela Cowperthwaite. On television, she had a recurring role on Angie Tribeca and played a leading role in the 2017 comedy pilot Amy’s Brother. In 2020, Mumolo recurred on the comedy-mystery Mapleworth Murders for Quibi.

In 2021, Mumolo re-teamed with Wiig on Barb and Star Go to Vista Del Mar, which they co-wrote and co-starred in. Originally scheduled for a 2020 release, the film was pushed back due to the COVID-19 pandemic and released in the United States via PVOD on February 12, 2021, by Lionsgate. The film received generally positive reviews from critics. Also in 2021, it was announced that Mumolo and Wiig would write a Disney live-action musical comedy centering on the evil stepsisters Anastasia and Drizella from the animated classic Cinderella. In 2022, Mumolo appeared in the crime comedy film, Confess, Fletch. She also starred in the comedy films Murder Mystery 2 and Joy Ride. She was cast in the drama film The Idea of You starring and produced by Anne Hathaway.

== Personal life ==
Mumolo was married to Tim Lovestedt from 2005 to 2016. The couple have two children.

== Filmography ==
=== Film ===
| Year | Title | Role | Notes |
|---|---|---|---|
| 2003 | Melvin Goes to Dinner | Extra | |
| 2005 | Bewitched | Bed, Bath and Beyond Shopper | |
| 2009 | Curious George: A Very Monkey Christmas | Bill | Voice |
| 2011 | Bridesmaids | Nervous Woman on Plane | Also writer Alliance of Women Film Journalists Award for Best Woman Screenwriter; Online Film Critics Society Award for Best First Screenplay; Nominated - Academy Award for Best Writing (Original Screenplay); Nominated - BAFTA Award for Best Original Screenplay; Nominated - Online Film Critics Society Award for Best Writing, Screenplay Written Directly for the Screen; Nominated - Washington D.C. Area Film Critics Association Award for Best Original Screenplay; Nominated - Writers Guild of America Award for Best Original Screenplay |
| 2012 | This Is 40 | Barb | |
| 2012 | Back to the Sea | Danny | Voice |
| 2013 | Afternoon Delight | Amanda | |
| 2013 | Curious George: Swings Into Spring | Bill, Sprint Quint | Voice |
| 2013 | Curious George: A Halloween Boo Fest | Bill | Voice |
| 2015 | Joy | | Story writer and executive producer |
| 2016 | The Boss | Helen | |
| 2016 | Bad Moms | Vicky | |
| 2017 | Megan Leavey | | Writer |
| 2020 | Looks That Kill | Jan | |
| 2021 | Barb and Star Go to Vista Del Mar | Barb | Also writer and producer Nominated - MTV Movie & TV Awards for Best Duo; Nominated - Florida Film Critics Circle Award for Best Screenplay |
| 2021 | Queenpins | Crystal | |
| 2022 | Confess, Fletch | Eve | |
| 2023 | Joy Ride | Mary Sullivan | |
| 2023 | Murder Mystery 2 | Mrs. Silverfox | |
| 2023 | Barbie | Anxiety Mom | |
| 2024 | The Idea of You | Tracy | |

=== Television ===
| Year | Title | Role | Notes |
|---|---|---|---|
| 2004 | Father of the Pride | Flamingo Girl | Voice, episode: "Catnip and Trust" |
| 2006–2022 | Curious George | Bill | Voice |
| 2006 | The Minor Accomplishments of Jackie Woodman | Boutique Clerk | Episode: "Peyote Ugly" |
| 2006 | Two and a Half Men | Teenage Girl #1 | Episode: "Corey's Been Dead for an Hour" |
| 2006 | Out of Practice | Miss Lipton | Episode: "Doctors Without Bidders" |
| 2006 | Danger Rangers | Jose | Episode: "Cave Save" |
| 2006–2007 | Maya & Miguel | Kylie | 4 episodes |
| 2007 | Ben & Izzy | Ben | Voice |
| 2007 | Random! Cartoons | Pixie, Little Prince, Munchie; Melissa, Strikeout, Rusty, Patch | Voice, 3 episodes |
| 2009 | Hero Heights | Strikeout | Voice |
| 2009 | Handy Manny | Lola | Voice |
| 2009 | Thom Cat | Melissa, Rusty, Patch | Voice |
| 2009 | Handy Manny's Motorcycle Adventure | Lola, Aunt Lupe | Voice |
| 2009 | Ape Escape | Jimmy, Natalie | Voice |
| 2009 | In the Motherhood | Person No. 1 in Coffee Place | Episode: "It Takes a Village Idiot"; also writer |
| 2009 | Fanboy & Chum Chum | Boy and Girl in Mecha-Tech Commercial, Francine (one line) | Voice, 2 episodes |
| 2010 | The Penguins of Madagascar | Large Boy, Boy #2 | Voice, episode: "Fit to Print"/"Operation: Cooties" |
| 2011–2019 | American Dad! | Adoptive Mother, additional voices | Voice, 2 episodes |
| 2012 | The Looney Tunes Show | Tina Russo | Voice, 11 episodes |
| 2013 | Modern Family | Esther | Episode: "Bad Hair Day" |
| 2014 | The Goldbergs | Betsy Rubenstone | Episode: "The Other Smother" |
| 2014 | Rake | Carol Grady | Episode: "Cancer" |
| 2014–2015 | About a Boy | Laurie | Series regular, 27 episodes |
| 2015 | Behind the Wheel | Herself | Host; Episode one |
| 2015 | Mike Tyson Mysteries | Julie | Voice, episode: "Last Night on Charlie Rose" |
| 2015 | Transparent | Poppy | Episode: "Cherry Blossoms" |
| 2016 | Lady Dynamite | Jill Kwatney-Adelman | Episode: "No Friend Left Behind" |
| 2017 | Nobodies | Herself | Episode: "Heavy Heart, Heavy Hands" |
| 2017 | Angie Tribeca | Beth Wiedner | 5 episodes |
| 2017 | Superior Donuts | Lucy | Episode: "Thanks for Nothing" |
| 2019 | The Unicorn | Allison | Episode: "Turkeys and Traditions" |
| 2020 | Mapleworth Murders | Paige Wellingtont | 6 episodes |
| 2023 | Miracle Workers | Linda Sherman | Episode: "H.O.A." |
| 2024 | Jellystone! | Jane Jetson, Rosie | Voice, episode: "Meet the Jetsons" |
| 2024 | Curb Your Enthusiasm | Melanie Stainback | Episode: "Disgruntled" |
| 2026 | Rooster | Chrisle | Recurring role |

Video games
| Year | Title | Role |
|---|---|---|
| 2005 | Neopets: The Darkest Faerie | Roberta, Lucy |
| 2012 | Final Fantasy XIII-2 | Additional Voices |
