= Barb and Star Go to Vista Del Mar =

2021 comedy film

- Promotional poster
- Directed by: Josh Greenbaum
- Written by: Kristen Wiig; Annie Mumolo
- Produced by: Jessica Elbaum; Annie Mumolo; Kristen Wiig; Adam McKay; Will Ferrell; Margot Hand
- Starring: Kristen Wiig; Annie Mumolo; Jamie Dornan; Damon Wayans Jr.
- Cinematography: Toby Oliver
- Edited by: Steve Welch
- Music by: Christopher Lennertz; Dara Taylor
- Production companies: Lionsgate; Gloria Sanchez Productions; Stellie
- Distributed by: Lionsgate
- Release date: February 12, 2021 (United States)
- Running time: 107 minutes
- Countries: United States; Mexico
- Language: English
- Box office: $32,825 (secondary window)

Barb and Star Go to Vista Del Mar is a 2021 comedy film directed by Josh Greenbaum and written by Kristen Wiig and Annie Mumolo, who also star and originally worked together on Bridesmaids. It is an international co-production film between the United States and Mexico. Originally scheduled for a 2020 theatrical release, due to the COVID-19 pandemic, the film was pushed back and released in the United States by Lionsgate via VOD on February 12, 2021. The film received generally positive reviews from critics.

== Plot ==
Middle-aged best friends Barb and Star leave their home of Soft Rock, Nebraska for the first time to go on vacation to Vista Del Mar, Florida. They are apprehensive about trying something new. The two friends construct a narrative about a woman named "Trish", who becomes a water spirit. Upon arrival, they find accommodations at the luxurious Vista Del Mar Hotel and resolve to try many excursions, particularly an inflatable banana inner tube ride.

Meanwhile, an eccentric villain, Sharon Fisherman, is plotting against the denizens of Vista Del Mar. Sharon lived there as a child, and her pale white skin and sensitivity to the sun made her an outcast and a target of bullying. She plans to unleash lethal mosquitos, killing everyone. She sends her henchman, Edgar, to Vista Del Mar to plant a homing beacon that will attract the mosquitos once they are unleashed. She falsely promises Edgar that if he succeeds, she will finally make their relationship official.

Barb and Star encounter Edgar at the hotel bar and begin to bond and party with him. The next morning, Edgar realizes he lost the microchip for the beacon during the night, infuriating Sharon. She sends another agent, Darlie Bunkle, to give Edgar another microchip and to spy on him, Barb, and Star. Barb meets with Edgar, but feels conflicted about seeing him behind Star's back, and decides not to pursue him any further. Star also meets with Edgar, but despite feeling conflicted about Barb, continues to have a sexual relationship with him in secret that develops into romance.

Star's secret tryst leaves Barb alone at the resort, and Barb tries out all Vista Del Mar has to offer. On the day of the annual Seafood Jam, she decides to wait for Star before going on the banana ride, but spots Star and Edgar having sex on Edgar's balcony. She goes to confront Edgar, but overhears his plans with Sharon. She informs Star, who accuses her of jealousy, while Barb accuses her of lying to her. Sharon uses photos from Darlie to convince Edgar that Barb and Star are spies and that Star was using him. She orders him to kill them. Edgar captures them but cannot bring himself to kill them, leaving them indoors where they will be safe and plants the beacon. They escape, but are kidnapped by Sharon, who brings them to an ocean cliff. She forces the women to jump, and leaves to go ensure her revenge succeeds. As they fall, Barb and Star's culottes act as parachutes that allow them to safely land on the ground. They reconcile and go to stop Sharon.

Edgar realizes that Sharon lied to him about Barb and Star, that she never loved him, and was setting him up to die. He spots Star and Barb and helps them locate the homing beacon. He confesses his love to Star, but they are held at gunpoint by Darlie. Edgar fights Darlie, while Star and Barb escape with the beacon, taking a jet ski out to sea to save the town. Sharon uses a human cannon to reach them, regaining the beacon. However, it is too late and the unleashed mosquitos converge on her. Barb and Star go underwater, avoiding the mosquitos. They are rescued and brought back to shore by Trish, the water spirit. Sharon arrives on shore, having survived the mosquitos by taking an antidote. Star recognizes that Sharon's hostility is born from her bullied childhood, and having never experienced true friendship (with the exception of a girl who befriended her only to be immediately eaten by an alligator). She offers to be Sharon's friend, as do the other residents, melting Sharon's icy facade. The town celebrates. Barb and Star ride the banana ride for hours. Yoyo arrives at the beach and initiates a celebration.

== Cast ==
- Kristen Wiig as Star and as Sharon Fisherman
  - Elizabeth Kelly as young Sharon Fisherman
  - Nevada Renee Arnold as three year old Fisherman
- Annie Mumolo as Barb Quicksilver
- Jamie Dornan as Edgar Pagét
- Damon Wayans Jr. as Darlie Bunkle
- Michael Hitchcock as Gary
- Kwame Patterson as George the Bartender
- Reyn Doi as Yoyo
- Wendi McLendon-Covey as Mickey Revelet
- Vanessa Bayer as Debbie
- Fortune Feimster as Pinky
- Rose Abdoo as Bev
- Phyllis Smith as Delores
- Mark Jonathan Davis as Richard Cheese
- Karen Maruyama as the Caricaturist
- Jayde Martinez as Maria Margolis
- Tom Lenk as Arnie
- Hank Rogerson as Foster Dad
- Josh Robert Thompson as Morgan Freemond
- Andy García (credited as Tommy Bahama) as Tommy Bahama
- Reba McEntire as Trish
- Ian Gomez as Retail Store Manager
- Gerry Bednob as Rick

== Production ==
The film was officially announced in April 2019, having been in production for a number of years, with Annie Mumolo and Kristen Wiig, the co-writers of the screenplay, set to play the titular characters, and Josh Greenbaum directing. Wiig and Mumolo also produced, alongside Jessica Elbaum, Will Ferrell, and Adam McKay, under the Gloria Sanchez Productions banner, with Lionsgate distributing. In June 2019, Jamie Dornan joined the cast of the film, and in July 2019, it was announced that Wendi McLendon-Covey and Damon Wayans Jr. had joined as well.

=== Filming ===
Principal photography began in July 2019. Production was initially supposed to take place in Atlanta, Georgia, but was moved to Cancun, Mexico, Puerto Vallarta, Mexico, and Albuquerque, New Mexico, in response to Georgia House Bill 481. Filming wrapped in September 2019.

== Release ==
Barb and Star Go to Vista Del Mar was scheduled to be released theatrically on July 31, 2020, but was pushed back to July 16, 2021, due to the COVID-19 pandemic. On January 11, 2021, Lionsgate announced that it was cancelling the film's theatrical release, and instead opened the film via premium VOD on February 12, 2021. In August 2021, it was announced that the film would receive a theatrical release at Alamo Drafthouse Cinema, beginning September 12, 2021 at its Los Angeles location and nationwide on September 19.

== Reception ==
=== VOD sales ===
In its first weekend of release, the film was the third-most rented title on Apple TV, fourth on FandangoNow, and fifth on Google Play. In its second weekend, the film finished fourth on Spectrum, fifth on FandangoNow, sixth on Apple TV, and seventh on Google Play.

=== Critical response ===
Review aggregator website Rotten Tomatoes reports that 80% of 178 critic reviews were positive, with an average rating of 6.4/10. The website's critics consensus reads, "Bright, colorful, and unabashedly silly, Barb & Star Go to Vista Del Mar reaffirms that Annie Mumolo and Kristen Wiig are still as fun—and funny—as ever." According to Metacritic, which sampled 30 critics and calculated a weighted average score of 64 out of 100, the film received "generally favorable" reviews.

Some critics praised Jamie Dornan's comedic performance and singing, with several saying he was a highlight of the film.

The Hollywood Reporter included the film among the best films of 2021 as of July 2021.

=== Accolades ===
Award	Date of ceremony	Category	Recipient(s)	Result	Ref.
Costume Designers Guild Awards	April 13, 2021	Excellence in Contemporary Film	Trayce Gigi Field	Nominated	
Critics' Choice Awards	March 13, 2022	Best Comedy	Barb and Star Go to Vista Del Mar	Nominated	
Denver Film Critics Society	January 17, 2022	Best Comedy	Barb and Star Go to Vista Del Mar	Nominated	
Florida Film Critics Circle	December 22, 2021	Best Original Screenplay	Kristen Wiig and Annie Mumolo	Nominated	
Florida Film Critics Circle	December 22, 2021	Best Art Direction / Production Design	Barb and Star Go to Vista Del Mar	Runner-up	
Indiana Film Journalists Association	December 20, 2021	Best Original Screenplay	Kristen Wiig and Annie Mumolo	Nominated	
Indiana Film Journalists Association	December 20, 2021	Best Supporting Actor	Jamie Dornan	Nominated	
Indiana Film Journalists Association	December 20, 2021	Best Ensemble Acting	Cast of Barb and Star Go to Vista Del Mar	Nominated	
Los Angeles Film Critics Association Awards	December 18, 2021	Best Production Design	Steve Saklad	Won	
MTV Movie & TV Awards	May 17, 2021	Best Duo	Barb and Star	Nominated	
San Diego Film Critics Society Awards	January 10, 2022	Best Comedic Performance	Jamie Dornan	Nominated	
