= List of The Fall episodes =

The Fall is a British crime drama television series filmed and set in Northern Ireland. The series is produced by Artists Studio and created by Allan Cubitt. It premiered in the Republic of Ireland on RTÉ at 9:30 pm on 12 May 2013, and in the United Kingdom on BBC Two at 9:00 pm on 13 May 2013. Starting in 2014, American streaming service Tubi TV started to release the show for U.S. viewers as exclusive original series at its launch lineup of programming. In 2020, the series now airs on Ovation (American TV channel), an American cable channel privately owned by Hubbard Broadcasting. The series stars Gillian Anderson as DSI Stella Gibson, a senior Metropolitan Police Detective and Jamie Dornan as serial killer Paul Spector.

== Series overview ==
Series	Episodes	Originally released	
Series	Episodes	First released	Last released
1	5	12 May 2013	9 June 2013
2	6	9 November 2014	13 December 2014
3	6	25 September 2016	28 October 2016

== Episodes ==
=== Series 1 (2013) ===
Gillian Anderson stars in the first series of The Fall, alongside Jamie Dornan, Bronagh Waugh, Niamh McGrady, John Lynch, Archie Panjabi, Stuart Graham, Ian McElhinney, Ben Peel, Frank McCusker, Michael McElhatton, and Laura Donnelly. It started broadcast in Ireland (RTÉ) on 12 May 2013, followed by the UK broadcast (BBC) on 13 May.

No. overall	No. in series	Title	Directed by	Written by	Original release date	UK viewers (millions)
1	1	"Dark Descent"	Jakob Verbruggen	Allan Cubitt	12 May 2013	4.49
Superintendent Stella Gibson (Gillian Anderson), a Senior Detective from the Met, is seconded to Belfast to supervise a 28-day review into the investigation of the death of Alice Monroe. A.C.C. Jim Burns (John Lynch) recommends Gibson view the case as a single entity, rather than as part of a larger pattern. As reporters begin to descend on Gibson, she asks to be introduced to Sergeant James Olson (Ben Peel), after spotting him at an unrelated crime scene, and she tells him her hotel room number. Apparently respectable family man Paul Spector (Jamie Dornan), meanwhile, continues to stalk 30-something solicitor Sarah Kay (Laura Donnelly), determined to make her his next victim, and a rogue reporter named Ned Callan (Nick Lee) attempts to make a name for himself at Gibson's expense.
2	2	"Darkness Visible"	Jakob Verbruggen	Allan Cubitt	19 May 2013	4.16
Gibson is called to the scene of Sarah Kay's murder, a crime for which PC Danielle Ferrington (Niamh McGrady) blames herself. Ferrington admits to Gibson that after unsuccessfully attempting to reach Sarah Kay the evening after the break-in, she and her partner left the premises, likely unknowingly leaving Kay with her attacker. Burns agrees to make Gibson the permanent Senior Investigating Officer (SIO) of the investigation, after she convinces him to admit that the murders are linked. Prof. Reed Smith (Archie Panjabi) arrives at the crime scene, joining the investigating team. DS Olson shows up at the scene of Sarah Kay's murder, asking Gibson why she has been ignoring his messages. Unimpressed by his breaching of the crime scene and of his sending her picture mails earlier, Gibson dismisses him. Morgan Monroe (Ian McElhinney) coerces Burns into clearing his son's name in relation to killings, whilst DS James Olson is assassinated outside his home. Meanwhile, Spector hides the evidence of his latest crime in the cache located in the ceiling of his daughter's bedroom, whilst Katie Benedetto (Aisling Franciosi), the children's 15-year-old babysitter, expresses her interest in him.
3	3	"Insolence & Wine"	Jakob Verbruggen	Allan Cubitt	26 May 2013	3.96
Gibson builds her team, whose investigation is now known as Operation Musicman. Impressed by Ferrington's honesty at the crime scene, Gibson asks her to be her right-hand man. Gibson is questioned about her one-night stand with James Olson, whom she has recently discovered was married. Gibson begins profiling the killer with her team. Meanwhile, Spector's wife Sally Ann (Bronagh Waugh), unaware of her husband's secret, becomes concerned about her daughter, who is having nightmares that threaten to reveal the killer's secret cache of murder paraphernalia. Spector first notices Gibson when he sees her on TV giving a press conference about the investigation.
4	4	"My Adventurous Song"	Jakob Verbruggen	Allan Cubitt	2 June 2013	4.28
Chief Inspector Matt Eastwood (Stuart Graham)'s investigation into DS Olson's death reveals the involvement of DI Breedlove (Michael McElhatton) with the Monroe family, forcing the latter to take drastic measures that drag Gibson deeper into Internal Affairs investigations. An old friend of Prof. Reed Smith, Rose Stagg, tells Gibson that a man named Peter had strangled her to near-unconsciousness while she was at university, nine years ago. Spector's professional relationship with Liz Tyler (Séainín Brennan) is questioned by both his bosses and her husband, abusive loyalist Jimmy (Brian Milligan), forcing him to speed up his next attack—with grave consequences. Meanwhile, his daughter may prove to be his downfall, as her nightmares become more prevalent and she begins to draw disturbing images.
5	5	"The Vast Abyss"	Jakob Verbruggen	Allan Cubitt	9 June 2013	4.65
Gibson begins to investigate the botched attack on Annie Brawley (Karen Hassan), bringing her one step closer to the killer, both emotionally and physically. The investigation begins to focus on a single individual. Gibson and Sarah Kay's father mount a televised plea for information pertaining to the murders. Gibson announces the killer will have an opportunity to converse with her privately, if he comes forward. In TV footage showing Sarah Kay passing through the gates of the municipal gardens, Spector can be seen following not far behind, thus forcing him to come forward to give a statement to the police and allow them to take his fingerprints and a DNA sample. A pregnant Sally Ann supports to the police Spector's false claim that he was at home on the evening of the attack on Brawley. Sally Ann confronts Spector about her lying to the police and he is forced to lie to Sally Ann, who wants to know what he has actually been doing late nights. He tells her he has been having a three-month affair with their children's young babysitter, Katie. The lie threatens to rip his family apart and expose his secret. Spector makes contact with Operation Musicman, revealing to Gibson details of his crimes, before leaving Belfast with his family to settle in Scotland. Annie Brawley awakens from her coma.

=== Series 2 (2014) ===
Gillian Anderson stars in the second series of The Fall, alongside Jamie Dornan, Bronagh Waugh, Niamh McGrady, John Lynch, Archie Panjabi, Stuart Graham, Aisling Franciosi, Valene Kane, Emmett J. Scanlan, Jonjo O'Neill, Colin Morgan, Bronagh Taggart, Karen Hassan, Nick Lee, Sean McGinley, Brian Milligan, and Séainín Brennan. It started broadcast in Ireland (RTÉ) on 9 November 2014, followed by the UK broadcast (BBC) on 13 November.

No. overall	No. in series	Title	Directed by	Written by	Original release date	UK viewers (millions)
6	1	"These Troublesome Disguises"	Allan Cubitt	Allan Cubitt	9 November 2014	3.54
Ten days after her telephone call with the killer, Superintendent Gibson tries to help Annie Brawley recapture her memories of the attack that left her hospitalised. Rose Stagg (Valene Kane), a friend to Smith, is inadvertently dragged into the case, forcing her to reveal secrets from her past to her husband Tom (Jonjo O'Neill). Meanwhile, following a break-up with Sally Ann, Spector returns to Belfast to tie up loose ends, much to the excitement of Katie, and to the dismay of his pregnant wife, who believes he had an affair with the children's babysitter. A thorough analysis of CCTV footage between Annie Brawley's home and the airport leads Gibson's team to search, and ultimately find, the decorating shears used to murder Joe Brawley.
7	2	"Night Darkens the Streets"	Allan Cubitt	Allan Cubitt	16 November 2014	3.11
Gibson is called in front of the PSNI's Policing Board, headed by Morgan Monroe, to discuss the lack of progress in the case, and Ferrington requests a transfer off the investigation. DCI Eastwood is assigned as Gibson's Deputy SIO following Brink's (Frank McCusker) reassignment. Gibson declares the investigation will focus on a single individual—Paul Spector—whose partial fingerprint has just been identified on the recovered murder weapon. Meanwhile, Spector abducts Rose Stagg, and warns Katie to stay away from his family after she picks up Olivia from school.
8	3	"Beauty Hath Strange Power"	Allan Cubitt	Allan Cubitt	23 November 2014	3.01
Gibson orders extensive surveillance on the suspect and his family. Gibson and Reed Smith share an intimate moment in the jazz bar of Gibson's hotel, but Smith finally chooses not to consummate the sexual liaison. Gibson returns alone to her room, where she receives the visit of a distraught Burns who informs her that he leaked information to Morgan Monroe about her investigation, tipping off his son and one-time-suspect Aaron. Burns (a recovering alcoholic who once shared an extra-marital affair with Gibson and has now relapsed into drinking) aggressively attempts to kiss her, and she fends him off with a palm strike. While she is cleaning his bloody nose in the toilet, Burns mentions that he was the arresting officer in a high-profile raid against a paedophile ring in one of the boys' homes, Gortnacul, where Spector had stayed, and speculates that Spector could have been abused as well. Meanwhile, Spector continues to groom Katie to assist him in his crimes. He breaks into Gibson's hotel room and witnesses her confrontation with Burns; he leaves while they are in the toilet, but not before reading and leaving a taunting message in her dream journal, thus making the cat and mouse game far more personal than it had been before. Spector rewards Katie for her assistance by engaging in masturbation during their video chat.
9	4	"The Mind is its Own Place"	Allan Cubitt	Allan Cubitt	30 November 2014	3.26
Gibson's huge surveillance operation continues to pay its dues. DC Martin (Emmett J. Scanlan) and DC McNally (Bronágh Taggart) head a team assigned to install closed circuit cameras and microphones in the suspect's home, a task that has unexpected consequences. The body of a young woman is found apparently fitting the description of Rose Stagg, but she turns out to be a heroin addict who had hanged herself. Gibson seizes the opportunity to bait the serial killer, by convincing young and eager DS Tom Anderson (Colin Morgan) to withhold the fact from the press that the dead woman is not Rose. Meanwhile, Spector returns home to find his house destroyed by the botched police operation. Katie continues to provide a false alibi for him and in exchange Spector continues to groom her to assist him in his killings.
10	5	"The Perilous Edge of Battle"	Allan Cubitt	Allan Cubitt	7 December 2014	3.15
Gibson continues to monitor the killer, and Burns visits the disgraced paedophile priest who headed the Gortnacul Boys' Home, Fiachra Jensen (Sean McGinley), who tells Burns that he did not abuse Spector. Ferrington responds to a call about a man matching the description of the suspect who has been taken hostage; the man indeed turns out to be Spector, being held at gunpoint by Jimmy Tyler after a brief scuffle and interrogated about the whereabouts of Jimmy's estranged wife Liz. Jimmy's accomplice shoots Ferrington in her flak jacket and is shot dead by her fellow officer, but Jimmy escapes. Meanwhile, while Katie works to destroy evidence in Spector's hotel, PC Hagstrom (Kelly Gough) heads a team to intercept and arrest her, Martin and McNally arrest Sally Ann for perverting the course of justice. Given that the chaos caused by Tyler in Belfast had compromised the entire surveillance on Spector, Gibson is forced to enact the rest of her strategy by having Anderson arrest Spector for the abduction of Rose Stagg. Gibson, monitoring the progress of the interviews from behind the scenes, is informed of a video that shows Rose pleading for her life, with the suspect’s face clearly on camera. The search team discover Spector's burnt car with conflicting evidence inside it.
11	6	"What is in Me Dark Illumine"	Allan Cubitt	Allan Cubitt	13 December 2014	3.60
Gibson views the cybersex video on Katie's phone and asks Anderson to interview Katie based on his superficial physical resemblance with Spector. Several people try to interrogate Spector, who refuses to talk to anyone but Gibson. Sally Ann suffers a miscarriage during interrogation, when informed about the crimes Spector is arrested for. Jimmy Tyler manages to locate Liz's women's refuge in Bangor where he assaults her and her fellow residents and nearly shoots them dead. Spector decides to confess all of his murders to Gibson, but remains tight-lipped about Rose's fate and whereabouts. Their interview is the first time they speak face to face, and he uses his knowledge of Gibson's dream journal to taunt her with his interpretation of her emotional fixation with her deceased father. Gibson and Anderson spend the night together. The next morning, she receives a call from Eastwood notifying her that Spector has agreed to take her team to a place in the woods in exchange for seeing his daughter. In the woods, Gibson locates a car with a barely alive Rose in the boot. The increasingly unhinged Jimmy Tyler, still shaken by his fist fight with Spector and the Bangor confrontation with Liz, follows the police procession to the woods and sneaks up to shoot Paul Spector and Tom Anderson, before being shot dead himself. The episode ends in a cliffhanger, with Spector's survival in question.

=== Series 3 (2016) ===
Gillian Anderson stars in the third series of The Fall, alongside Jamie Dornan, Bronagh Waugh, John Lynch, Aisling Franciosi, Valene Kane, Jonjo O'Neill, Colin Morgan, Aisling Bea, Richard Coyle, Barry Ward, Richard Clements, Ruth Bradley, Genevieve O'Reilly, Aidan McArdle, Denise Gough, Conor MacNeill, Luke Whoriskey and Krister Henriksson. It started broadcast in Ireland (RTÉ) on 25 September 2016, followed by the UK broadcast (BBC) on 29 September.

No. overall	No. in series	Title	Directed by	Written by	Original release date	UK viewers (millions)
12	1	"Silence and Suffering"	Allan Cubitt	Allan Cubitt	25 September 2016	3.54
After the events in the forest, Anderson, Spector and Rose are taken to the general hospital, where the doctors battle to save Spector's life. Kiera (Aisling Bea) is the nurse assigned to care for Spector. Gibson's shock turns to numbness as she panics at the prospect of Spector not surviving and justice not being delivered to the victims' families. Katie despairs as news of Spector's shooting makes the news. Olivia, Spector's daughter, finds news articles about Spector being the 'Belfast Strangler' online.
13	2	"His Troubled Thoughts"	Allan Cubitt	Allan Cubitt	2 October 2016	3.17
Gibson and Burns are under investigation for the way Spector's case was handled. Rose demands to leave the hospital after discovering Spector is in a bed only a few feet away. Katie lashes out at her former friend, who spoke to the press about Spector, squirting concentrated lemon juice in her eyes as revenge. Gibson and the officers investigate a lock-up rented by Spector and discover disturbing photos and journals that suggest further killings. Sally Ann secures one of Belfast's most well-known defence lawyers, Sean Healy (Aidan McArdle) to plead Spector's case. Spector regains consciousness and after interacting with his wife and daughter, it is apparent he is suffering from amnesia and does not remember anything after 2006.
14	3	"The Gates of Light"	Allan Cubitt	Allan Cubitt	9 October 2016	3.06
Spector speaks with a neuropsychologist and his lawyers, maintaining he has no memory of any of his alleged crimes. Spector and his nurse, Kiera, grow closer to each other. Evidence from the lock-up points to the possibility of at least nine additional stalking projects that may have materialised into murders, and Gibson instructs her team to identify the victims. Anderson complements this by looking into the list of Spector's fellow Gortnacul inmates in 1992 where he finds a David Alvarez (Martin McCann) who is currently serving life for the 2002 murder of a young brunette woman, Susan Harper, in London. The DPP wants to pursue charges against Sally Ann for aiding Spector. Gibson interviews Rose about the events surrounding her abduction. Desperate, Sally Ann feeds her children warm milk laced with sleeping drugs and with the children sleeping in the car, drives down to the beach.
15	4	"The Hell Within Him"	Allan Cubitt	Allan Cubitt	16 October 2016	3.31
Sally Ann's car, nearly submerged in the high tide, is seen by a passerby just before it floats away. She and the children are rescued and taken to hospital. The judge orders that Spector be transferred to a secure psychiatric facility to undergo evaluation to determine whether he is mentally fit for trial. Nurse Kiera bids him farewell by surreptitiously handing him a 20 pound note with the quote "He that loves not abides in death" from the Book of John; the reason for this act (as well as for the emotional intimacy she had developed with Spector, despite her physical resemblance to most of his victims) is left unexplained. Spector's legal team try to discredit the confession Spector made to Gibson. Gibson tells Dr. Larson (Krister Henriksson) about Spector's sexual perversions and higher-than-average IQ; she also advises him to complement his clinical approach with an acute awareness of the danger posed by Spector. Having witnessed CCTV footage of Spector discarding Kiera's note as he was brought into the forensic ward, Gibson retrieves it on her way out. In another interview with Rose, Gibson admits a police blunder led to her abduction.
16	5	"Wounds of Deadly Hate"	Allan Cubitt	Allan Cubitt	23 October 2016	3.48
Spector develops a rapport with fellow patient Mark Bailey (Conor MacNeill), who shows little to no remorse for having raped and murdered his 12-year-old sister. Anderson and Ferrington go to London to speak to Alvarez about the 2002 murder of Susan Harper. Alvarez recounts the horrific sexual abuse all boys experienced by the staff members at Gortnacul, and it is revealed that both Jensen and Spector had lied about the former not having abused the latter: Spector in fact suffered the worst abuse as Jensen's "favourite", but when Spector was due to leave and had to nominate a successor for Jensen's special attentions, he spared Alvarez by nominating another boy -- an action for which Alvarez was grateful enough to take the rap for Spector's crime a decade later. Spector has his evaluation with Dr. Larson. Katie is sentenced to a juvenile detention centre for her assault. Later, in an interview with Spector and his lawyer, Anderson and Gibson press for information about Alvarez and the young brunette woman. Convinced Alvarez is innocent and is protecting Spector, they announce that Spector is being charged with her murder. Spector remarks that it is a smart move by police as he is able to remember this time period.
17	6	"Their Solitary Way"	Allan Cubitt	Allan Cubitt	28 October 2016	3.08
The police interview continues. Spector recounts the death of Susan Harper as a sex game gone wrong. Gibson taunts Spector, telling him to grow up and drop the act. Spector unexpectedly attacks her during an interview break, leaving her severely battered. He also breaks Anderson's arm when the latter tries to intervene. Five security guards manage to restrain Spector and drag him out of the room, and Gibson and Anderson end up in hospital. After witnessing Spector's outburst, Burns has a nervous breakdown and is unable to hide his relapse into alcohol from his colleagues, and Wallace quits Spector's legal team. Back at the Foyle Clinic, Dr. Larson informs Spector that he is treatable, but suggests that he is not curable, and it becomes apparent to Spector that the insanity plea by way of amnesia is now beyond reach. Gibson visits Katie Benedetto in the juvenile detention facility, where she has been self-harming. She urges Katie not to ruin her life to impress Spector. Meanwhile, Spector persuades Mark Bailey to create a distraction in the lounge. In the ensuing chaos, Spector beats up Dr. Larson and takes his belt. He uses it to strangle Bailey to death, before hanging himself on the back of the bathroom door with a plastic bag over his head and the belt. His mother committed suicide in a similar manner on her bedroom door when Spector was eight. Following Spector's death, Operation Musicman is disbanded and Burns resigns. Gibson returns to her home in London. She hangs the 20 pound note left given to Spector by nurse Kiera on her refrigerator door.
