= Gerard Jordan =

Actor from Belfast, Northern Ireland

Gerard Jordan is an actor from Belfast, Northern Ireland.

== Career ==
He is best known for his recurring roles in the Northern Irish TV series Pulling Moves (2004) and in BBC's The Fall (2013–2014), and for his portrayal of Biter in the HBO series Game of Thrones (2012–2014). He also starred in the Irish drama film Peacefire (2008) and he played the role of Jim in Oliver Hirschbiegel's Five Minutes of Heaven (2009).

== Filmography ==
=== Film ===
Year	Title	Role	Notes
1998	Divorcing Jack	Pizza Shop Boy	
2000	Accelerator	Gash	
2002	Boxed	Dom	
2008	Peacefire	Spuds	
2008	Fifty Dead Men Walking	Kieran	
2009	Five Minutes of Heaven	Jim	
2009	Savage	Bully	
2014	'71	Huge Man	
2014	Shooting for Socrates	Albert Kirk	
2019	A Bump Along the Way	Kieran	
2021	Nightride	Troy	
2023	The Glenarma Tapes	Tommy	

=== Television ===
Year	Title	Role	Notes
?	Give My Head Peace	?	1 episode
2004	Pulling Moves	Hoker	5 episodes
2012–2014	Game of Thrones	Biter	4 episodes
2013	Foyle's War	Soldier	1 episode ("The Cage")
2013	Scúp	Photographer	1 episode ("Hostage")
2013–2014	The Fall	Brian Stone	7 episodes
2014	Roy	Malcom	1 episode ("I'm a Big Roy Now")
2017	The Frankenstein Chronicles	Constable Westbrook	4 episodes
2019-2021	Brassic	Niall Dennings	3 episodes
2020	My Left Nut	Tommy's Da	1 episode
2023	Blue Lights	Anto Donovan	6 episodes
