= Peacefire (film) =

- Film poster
- Directed by: Macdara Vallely
- Written by: Macdara Valley
- Produced by: Chris Martin; Sarah Perry
- Starring: John Travers; Gerard Jordan; Sean Roberts; Conor MacNeill; Pauline Goldsmith
- Cinematography: Núria Roldos
- Edited by: Macdara Vallely
- Music by: Brendan Dolan
- Production company: mayFLY Entertainment
- Distributed by: RDS Media Capital
- Release date: 5 July 2008 (Karlovy Vary International Film Festival)
- Running time: 87 minutes
- Country: Northern Ireland
- Language: English

Peacefire is a 2008 independent drama film direct by Macdara Vallely.

== Plot ==
Colin McNally is a troubled teenager being brought up by his widowed mother following his father's death. With his carefree attitude towards the political situation in Northern Ireland, Colin becomes involved in criminal activities. He and friends, Spuds and Jimbo begin to steal cars, take them for a joyride and later set fire to them. Following a car accident on one of their joyrides, Colin and his friends escape with only a few minor injuries and are arrested. While he and his friends are separately being questioned, a policeman makes Colin an offer - either he helps the police by becoming an informant in bringing down a top IRA man or he and his friends will be sent to prison.

Although his father was a top IRA man before he died, Colin, knowing that he is making the wrong decision and that he would be going against his father and the others, takes the policeman up on his offer in order to stay out of prison which causes friction between him and his friends. Colin, Spuds, and Jimbo continue their criminal behavior and following numerous warnings from the police and the IRA, who has been lenient with Colin for who is father was, Spuds and Jimbo are kneecapped and Colin, having escaped this, is threatened and told to leave the country. Colin eventually has the top IRA man captured, and with his guilt he goes to the local priest for forgiveness.

While there is nothing more the priest can do, the IRA men enter the church and take Colin to kill him. Colin asks one last thing of them for which it is granted. He writes a letter to his mother telling her that he is safe and well in England so that she will not worry about him. Colin is then shot dead by the IRA men.

== Cast ==
- John Travers as Colin
- Gerard Jordan as Spuds
- Sean Roberts as Jimbo
- Conor MacNeill as Pots
- Pauline Goldsmith as Avril
- Gerry Doherty as Moorcroft
- Richard Parkin as Steele
- Terry O'Neill as Patsy
- B.J. Hogg as Fatboy
- Vincent Fegan as Father Peter
- Brian Devlin as Mr. Doyle

== Release ==
The film was originally premiered in the Czech Republic on 5 July 2008 at Karlovy Vary International Film Festival, a week before premiering in Ireland on 12 July 2008, in which it had been shown at the Galway Film Fleadh. It was shown at the Athens Film Festival in Greece on 23 September 2008. In France, Peacefire premiered at the Angers Film Festival on 21 January 2009 and in the United States in September 2009 at the Los Angeles Irish Film Festival.

== Reception ==
In his review on Associated Press, Peter Brunette said that "even cliched moments (...) The script is solid, straight-ahead meat-and-potatoes stuff that clearly presents Colin’s options when the IRA comes after him, none of which are good." Writing to Irish Echo, Joseph Hurley said that "is, to quote the playwright’s subtitle, 'a multimedia political rave,' but what it really is is an emotionally valid, richly evocative fragment of ordinary life in terrible times."

== Awards ==
Year	Award Show	Award	Category	Result	Recipient(s)
2008	Galway Film Fleadh	Feature Film Award	Best Feature	Won	Chris Martin
2008	Galway Film Fleadh	Feature Film Award	Best First Feature	Won	Macdara Vallely
2009	Angers European First Film Award	European Jury Award	Feature Film	Won	Chris Martin
2009	Angers European First Film Award	European Special Jury Award		Won	Macdara Vallely
