= Conor MacNeill =

Actor from Northern Ireland

- Born: Belfast, Northern Ireland
- Occupation: Actor
- Years active: 2004–present

Conor MacNeill is a film, television, and stage actor from Northern Ireland. He is best known for his role as Kenny Kilbane in the BBC Two and HBO series Industry (2020–Present).

== Early life and education ==
MacNeill was born in West Belfast.

== Career ==
In his early career, MacNeill appeared in such films as Fifty Dead Men Walking and Peacefire directed by Macdara Vallely. He made a cameo appearance as 'Fanta' in Cherrybomb. He also played the character of Dave in Five Minutes of Heaven, which was directed by Oliver Hirschbiegel and premiered at the 2009 Sundance Film Festival.

He starred as Ciaran MacIonraic in the Irish comedy-drama An Crisis, for which he received a nomination for Outstanding Actor in a Comedy drama series at the 2010 Festival de Télévision de Monte-Carlo.

He performed extensively on stage in Ireland. Acting in productions at Lyric Players' Theatre, Gate Theatre, and Project Arts Centre. He was nominated for Best Supporting Actor at the 2011 Irish Times Theatre Awards.

In 2011, he appeared, with Brendan Fraser in Whole Lotta Sole directed by Terry George. He also appeared alongside David Wilmot in RTÉ's Saving The Titanic playing Frank Bell.

MacNeill made his London stage debut in 2012 at the Donmar Warehouse, appearing on stage alongside Daniel Radcliffe in The Cripple of Inishmaan by Martin McDonagh, directed by Michael Grandage at the Noël Coward Theatre throughout the summer of 2013. In spring 2014, this production transferred to Broadway at the Cort Theatre in New York for a limited run. The show garnered six Tony Award nominations.

In 2016, MacNeill appeared in Whit Stillman's film Love & Friendship and in the final episodes of the RTE/BBC series The Fall. In 2017, he appeared in series 2 of No Offence on Channel 4. He reprised the role of Gavin in series 3 in 2018.

In April 2017, he appeared in The Ferryman at the Royal Court Theatre, ahead of a transfer to the Gielgud Theatre in the West End. He reprised his role as Diarmuid Corcoran in the Broadway transfer of the show at Bernard B. Jacobs Theatre in late 2018. MacNeill had a small role as William Kemmler in The Current War in 2017.

In 2023, MacNeill appeared as Martyn Smith in BBC One's true crime drama The Sixth Commandment, portraying the crimes of Ben Field.

In February 2024, it was announced that MacNeill had been cast as Ned Gowan in the Outlander prequel series Outlander: Blood of My Blood.

MacNeill appears in the thriller film Bring Them Down, due to be released in Irish and UK cinemas on 7 February 2025.

As of 2025 MacNeill is co-writing a feature film in collaboration with long-time colleague Jamie Dornan through their production company, Blackthorn Films.

== Filmography ==
=== Film ===
Year	Film	Role	Notes
2008	Peacefire	Pots	
2008	Fifty Dead Men Walking	Frankie	
2008	City of Ember	Student	
2009	Five Minutes of Heaven	Dave – 1975	
2009	Cherrybomb	Fanta	
2010	Parked	Sol	
2011	Whole Lotta Sole	Sox	
2012	Good Vibrations	Schoolboy Executive	
2015	Orthodox	Young Shannon	
2016	Love & Friendship	Young Curate	
2016	The Siege of Jadotville	Radio Operator	
2017	The Current War	William Kemmler	
2020	Artemis Fowl	Goblin Lieutenant	
2021	Belfast	McLaury	
2022	Operation Fortune: Ruse de Guerre	Bodhi – IT Specialist	
2023	In the Land of Saints and Sinners	Conan McGrath	
2024	King Frankie	Jeffrey	
2024	Buffalo Kids	Tom	Voice role
2025	Bring Them Down	Nathan	

=== Television ===
Year	Film	Role	Notes
2004	Pulling Moves	Hood in Taxi	Episode: "The Pirate and the Choirboys"
2010–2013	An Crisis	Ciaran	12 episodes
2012	Saving the Titanic	Frank Bell	Television film
2013	Privates	Private McIlvenny	5 episodes
2013	Coming Up	Eddie	Episode: "Call It a Night"
2014	Scúp	Gerry	6 episodes
2015	Peep Show	Clerk	Episode: "Are We Going to Be Alright?"
2016	The Fall	Bailey	3 episodes
2017–2018	No Offence	Gavin Nuttle	12 episodes
2018	Death and Nightingales	Gary Pringle	3 episodes
2018–2020	101 Dalmatian Street	Fergus Fox/Apollo Stallion	Episode: "Jurassic Pups"
2019	Rebellion	Diarmuid McWilliams	2 episodes
2019	Resistance	Diarmuid McWilliams	2 episodes
2019	101 Dalmatian Street Shorts	Fergus Fox	Episode: "Jurassic Pups"
2020–Present	Industry	Kenny Kilbane	17 episodes
2022	Derry Girls	Hans	Episode: "The Night Before"
2023	The Sixth Commandment	Martyn Smith	4 episodes
2023	The Tourist	Detective Ruairi Slater	6 episodes
TBA	Outlander: Blood of My Blood	Ned Gowan	Post-production
