= Georgina Henry =

British journalist (1960–2014)

- Henry in 2011
- Born: Georgina Clare Henry; 8 June 1960; Aden, Aden Protectorate
- Died: 7 February 2014 (aged 53); London, England
- Education: Battle Abbey School, East Sussex; Cranbrook School, Kent; King's College London
- Occupation: Journalist
- Spouse: Ronan Bennett (m. 2003)
- Children: 2, including Finn Bennett

Georgina Clare Henry (8 June 1960 – 7 February 2014) was a British journalist. Associated with The Guardian newspaper for 25 years from 1989 until her death in 2014, she held several senior positions at the newspaper.

== Biography ==
Born in Aden, Aden Protectorate to parents William "Mike" Henry and Annette (née Duvivier, of Belgian heritage), where her father was an army officer, Henry had an unsettled childhood as her father regularly changed postings; he retired as a full colonel. Henry was educated at Battle Abbey School in East Sussex, Cranbrook School, Kent, and King's College London, where she read history. At King's College she met Ronan Bennett, subsequently a writer, who became her lifelong partner.

Always known as "George", Henry began her career in journalism in 1984 initially working for media trade publications. She joined The Guardian as a media correspondent in 1989 from Broadcast magazine and became the editor of Media Guardian a year later. She was deputy features editor under Alan Rusbridger from 1993.

Henry's appointment as deputy editor of The Guardian in 1995 was Rusbridger's first significant staff decision after becoming editor. For some months before The Guardian adopted the Berliner format in 2005, she was effectively the paper's editor as editor-in-chief Alan Rusbridger and another deputy editor, Paul Johnson, were heavily involved in its redesign.

By this time, The Guardian was committed to developing an online presence, and Henry was involved with related projects after ceasing to be deputy editor in 2006. Following a visit by Henry, for inspiration, to the New York headquarters of The Huffington Post, its founder Arianna Huffington thought Henry was a "kindred spirit",

Henry launched the Comment is Free section of The Guardian's website. She became executive comment editor in March 2007, and took over from Seumas Milne responsibility for the Comment is Free website and comment pages in the newspaper.

In 2010, she was made the Head of Culture across Guardian News and Media, which includes The Observer newspaper. In 2011, Henry was appointed the head of the paper's website, guardian.co.uk, in succession to Janine Gibson.

With Eve Pollard and Deborah Orr, among others, she set up Women in Journalism in 1995, and remained on its advisory board for the rest of her life. According to The Times obituary writer, Henry was "admired by colleagues for her courage, skill, enthusiasm and trustworthiness, she was a pioneering figure in the field of journalism and a trailblazing example for women in the profession."

== Personal life ==
Henry married Ronan Bennett, a Northern Irish novelist and screenwriter, in 2003; the couple had two children, one of whom is actor Finn Bennett.

After experiencing double vision during a skiing holiday in late 2011, Henry was diagnosed with a cancerous sinus tumour behind her right eye. Despite an operation to remove her eye and excise the tumour, the cancer had spread to her brain. She died on 7 February 2014, aged 53.
