= Stella Gibson =

Fictional character from The Fall

- The Fall character
- Gillian Anderson as DSU Stella Gibson
- First appearance: "Dark Descent"
- Last appearance: "Their Solitary Way"
- Created by: Allan Cubitt
- Portrayed by: Gillian Anderson

In-universe information
- Gender: Female
- Title: Detective Superintendent
- Occupation: Metropolitan Police Service
- Nationality: British

Detective Superintendent (DSU) Stella Gibson is the main character in the crime drama television series The Fall, which is filmed and set in Northern Ireland. She is portrayed by Gillian Anderson.

== Character overview ==
Detective Superintendent Stella Gibson is an English Metropolitan Police officer assigned to the Police Service of Northern Ireland on a 28-day review in the city of Belfast who later accepts a semi-permanent secondment to supervise Operation Musicman. Gibson is a senior investigating officer tasked with the reviewing of investigations. With her investigation stalled, Gibson is forced to get results under the threat of a new 28-day review into Operation Musicman. Initially unbeknownst to her, but known to the audience from the very beginning, all crimes investigated by Operation Musicman are committed by a man named Paul Spector who lives a successful double life as a married bereavement counselor, and who comes to see Gibson as his nemesis before she even knows of his existence.

Gibson is a highly capable officer, and is extremely comfortable with her own sexuality. Her view of gender relations seems to be firmly aligned with third-wave feminism. This leads to friction with her colleagues in the PSNI, particularly Assistant Chief Constable Jim Burns (with whom she shares a brief sexual history), and Detective Chief Inspector Matt Eastwood, who nonetheless repeatedly displays a level of respect and discretion with regards to Gibson's private life that comes across as surprising to her. Some of her comments to Burns, and the evidence backing Spector's pointed remarks during interrogation, could potentially indicate that she bridges the gap between feminism and misandry, but whether or not this is true is left open to speculation.

== Etymology ==
Creator-writer Allan Cubitt was inspired by guitar manufacturing companies when naming many of his characters. Both Stella and Gibson are brands of guitar. Cubitt explained: "I gave Stella Gibson a double guitar name as she's my central character. As a writer sometimes it's incredibly important that you write about things that interest you and you just know when names are right. I love music and I love guitars and have been playing them for years. In fact, my first ever guitar was a Gibson."

== Conception ==
Cubitt started writing the script in 2010 with Anderson in mind, stating: "I always thought that Gillian would be the best person to play the part. I'd written three episodes of Season 1, and we approached Gillian and talked it through. And I was in the incredibly gratifying position of her saying that she was interested in doing it. It's not very often that you get your first choice of actor, so that sets the project off in a really good way." Cubitt added: "There's such an intelligence going on in Gillian's acting, I think, your eye is drawn to her. Gibson has that quality because Gillian's playing her, but I always wanted Stella to have that sort of star quality, that kind of charisma that makes people want to do their best work for her, which, I think again, is just an aspect of her as a leader. She inspires in people the desire to please her in some kind of way."

On Gibson's femininity and appearance, Anderson explained: "It almost felt like it was in the script, somehow between the lines... She isn't interested in dressing like a man; she's not using her clothes to get anything from anybody else – it's not a device. She's dressing for herself. She has good taste – you can just tell. I don't know how, it's hard to say – but you can tell from the page somehow how she takes care of herself. But it's for herself and for herself alone."

On the inscrutable quality that her character possesses, Anderson said: "She doesn't reveal much about herself, so the little bits she does feel quite large."

== Reception ==
Amy Sullivan called The Fall "The Most Feminist Show on Television", writing: "Refreshingly, none of the tropes we've been trained to expect in a story about a powerful woman play out. Nobody resents Gibson's appearance on the scene or questions her authority. Her gender is a non-issue; subordinates hop to when she enters a room and they follow her commands without question. Gibson doesn't try to submerge her femininity and stomp around barking out orders. In Anderson's restrained yet compelling performance, Gibson is cool, calm, and always chic, with the most fabulous coat in detectivedom."

Gibson was ranked on Yahoo! list of "Greatest TV Characters Since Tony Soprano". Ken Tucker wrote: "Steely and precise, priding herself on being in control, Detective Inspector [sic] Gibson is a brilliant investigator, logical yet willing to go with hunches as they occur to her. Like some of her male colleagues, she's also made a few errors in judgment when it comes to interoffice involvements — one-night stands and trickier relationships as well. Dogged and obsessive, Gibson is as hard-boiled as any of her male counterparts in leading an investigation."
