= Battle Abbey School =

Independent school in East Sussex, England

Location
- Battle, East Sussex, TN33 0AD; England; 50.914°N 0.487°E

Information
- Type: Independent day and boarding school
- Motto: Foy est tout (Faith is all)
- Religious affiliation: C of E / Inter-denominational
- Established: 1912
- Department for Education URN: 114622 Tables
- Head teacher: Hannah Blake
- Gender: Co-educational
- Age: 3 months to 18 years
- Enrolment: 360~
- Houses: St Mary's; St Martin's; St Etheldreda's; St Patrick's
- Colours: Maroon, White
- Website: www.battleabbeyschool.com

Battle Abbey School is a private coeducational day and boarding school in the small town of Battle, East Sussex, England. The senior school occupies part of the town's ruined abbey complex, and it is from here that the school derives its name. Originally formed as St Etheldreda's, in 1989 Glengorse and Hydneye was merged into the school.

== History ==
Battle Abbey was constructed at the behest of the Norman invader William the Conqueror to commemorate his victory in the Battle of Hastings at the site over the Anglo-Saxon King of England, Harold Godwinson in 1066. The abbey was suppressed during the dissolution of the monasteries under King Henry VIII and some of the abbey buildings were destroyed. The 13th-century Abbot’s house was preserved and passed into private hands, and numerous additional structures also survived including the 14th-century gatehouse (which now serves as the main school gate) as well as a ruined monks' dorter (dormitory).

The school was founded in 1912, as St Etheldreda's, Bexhill-on-Sea, by May Jacoby and her sister Helen Sheehan-Dare. It moved into the Abbey in 1922, with an enrolment of 33 girls. Within a year there were 100 girls and the Board of Education officially recognised the school in 1926. There was a major fire in 1931 which caused extensive damage, notably to the Abbot's Hall; restoration was carried out by the architect Harold Brakspear.

The Abbot's Hall now contains the (extremely) large painting of the Battle of Hastings by Francis Wilkin.

The Abbot's house now forms the centrepiece of the senior school, with the preparatory school and nursery situated in the nearby town of Bexhill-on-Sea.

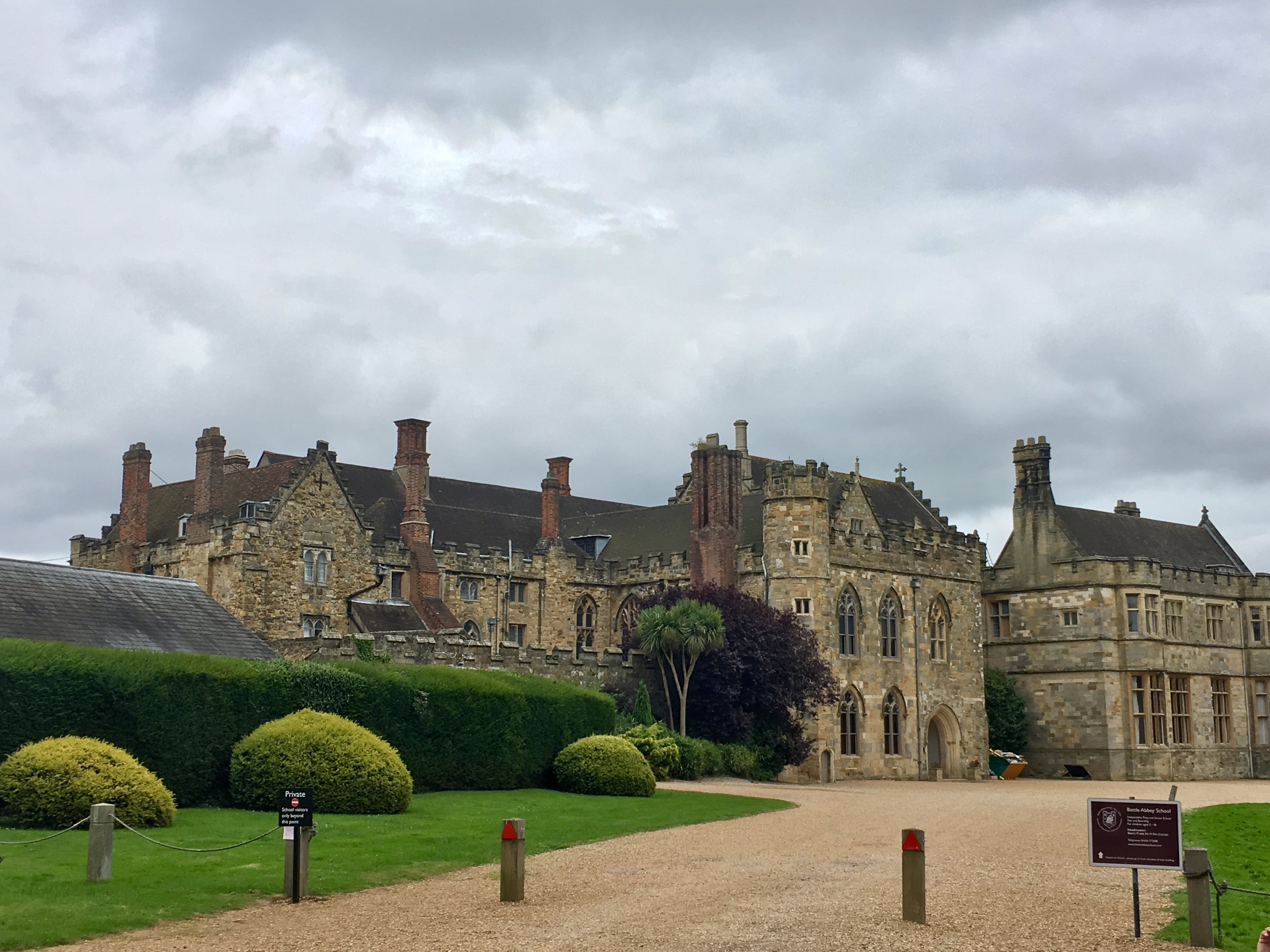
Battle Abbey School

== Notable alumni ==
- Tana Ramsey, best-selling author and wife of Gordon Ramsey
- Georgina Henry, journalist
- George Mallory, Everest mountaineer (attended Glengorse 1896–1900)
- Dan Poulter, Conservative Member of Parliament for Central Suffolk and North Ipswich; defected to Labour in 2024
- Clare Torry, singer
