= Hidden (2011 TV series) =

- DVD cover
- Genre: Crime drama
- Created by: Ronan Bennett; Walter Bernstein
- Written by: Ronan Bennett
- Directed by: Niall MacCormick
- Starring: Philip Glenister; Thekla Reuten; Anna Chancellor; Séainín Brennan; Michael Winder; David Suchet; Ben Smith; Andrew Scarborough
- Country of origin: United Kingdom
- Original language: English
- No. of series: 1
- No. of episodes: 4

Production
- Executive producers: David M. Thompson; Ed Rubin; Stephen Wright
- Producer: Christopher Hall
- Running time: 57 minutes
- Production companies: Origin Pictures; BBC Northern Ireland

Original release
- Network: BBC One
- Release: 6 October – 27 October 2011

Hidden is a British television drama starring Philip Glenister, Thekla Reuten, Anna Chancellor, Michael Winder, Andrew Scarborough and David Suchet, which debuted on BBC One on 6 October 2011. The four-part series was directed by Niall MacCormick, produced by Christopher Hall, and created by Ronan Bennett and Walter Bernstein.

== Overview ==
Small-time solicitor Harry Venn (Glenister) is reluctantly drawn back into his dark past after being approached by Gina Hawkes (Reuten). Hawkes, a lawyer searching for a missing alibi witness for her client, quickly draws Venn into a deep and dangerous conspiracy involving the death of his brother twenty years previously, and which reaches deep into the heart of the British political system.

== Cast ==
- Philip Glenister as Harry Venn
- Thekla Reuten as Gina Hawkes
- David Suchet as Sir Nigel Fountain
- Thomas Craig as D.I. Fenton Russell
- Anna Chancellor as Elspeth Verney
- Séainín Brennan as Frances Martin
- Andrew Scarborough as Ben Lander
- Matthew Marsh as James Morpeth
- Bertie Carvel as Alexander Wentworth
- Richard Dormer as Frank Hanna
- Paul Ritter as Stevie Quirke
- Peter Guinness as Jason Styles
- Ben Smith as Matt Grogan
- David Michaels as Brian Worsley
- Christopher Fairbank as George Venn
- Rupert Simonian as Michael Venn
- Mark Powley as Mark Venn
- Lisa Kay as Lauren Chisholm
- Michael Winder as Kevin Gaunt
- Mark Flitton as Paul Hillman
- Christov Ruhn as Mezwar Tanzir
- Audrey Looten as Jennifer Moscati
- Mens-Sana Tamakloe as Dean Stubbs
- Christopher Webster as Young Harry Venn
- Marie-France Alvarez as Nadine

== Episodes ==
No.	Title	Directed by	Written by	Original release date	UK viewers (millions)
1	"Episode 1"	Niall MacCormick	Ronan Bennett	6 October 2011	6.09
2	"Episode 2"	Niall MacCormick	Ronan Bennett	13 October 2011	5.05
3	"Episode 3"	Niall MacCormick	Ronan Bennett	20 October 2011	4.53
4	"Episode 4"	Niall MacCormick	Ronan Bennett	27 October 2011	4.58

== Critical reception ==
Josephine Moulds of The Telegraph said of the series: "All in all it was terribly exciting. Less pretentious than Page Eight and more ambitious than Spooks, Hidden nailed the intelligent, pacy TV thriller."
