= Séainín Brennan =

Northern Irish Actor

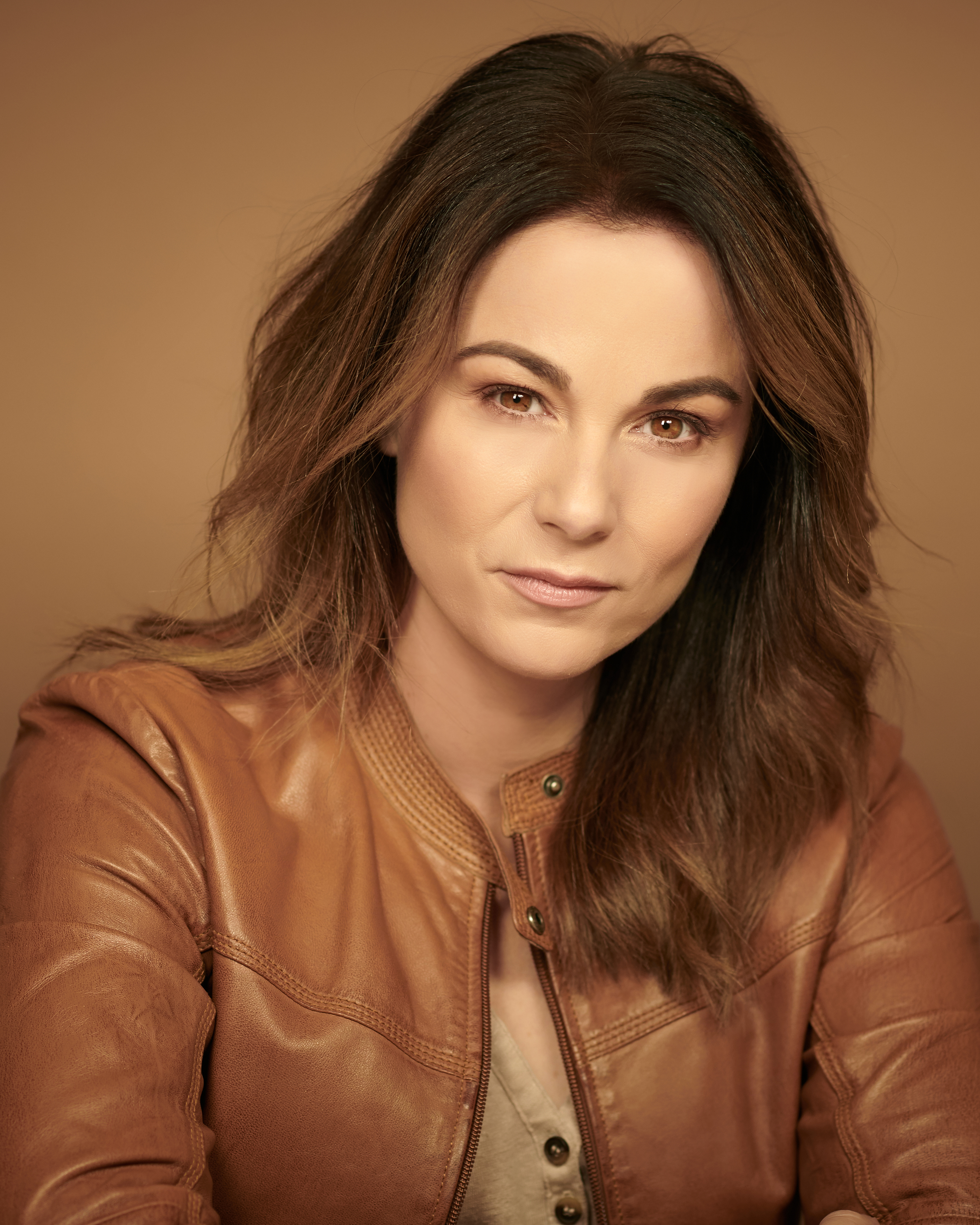
- Brennan in 2023
- Born: Belfast, Northern Ireland
- Education: University of Ulster, College of Europe, Guildford School of Acting
- Occupation: Actress
- Known for: Hidden (2011), The Fall (2013–2016), Come Home (2018), Hache (2019), This Town (2022)
- Spouse: Ben Fetherston (m. 2015)

Séainín Brennan is a Northern Irish actress. She is known for various lead roles in TV, theatre and film. Brennan starred opposite Philip Glenister as Frances in Ronan Bennett's political conspiracy thriller Hidden, a role which saw her named Woman of the Year in the Arts by the Belfast Telegraph. She is recognized as one of the most notable stage actresses from Northern Ireland.

== Early life and education ==
Brennan was born in Belfast to Tom Brennan and Maura Brennan (née Rafferty). She grew up on the Malone Road in South Belfast, and at the age of 8, she starred in her first play. As a child actress, she starred in various musicals, plays, television adverts and then as a television presenter. She attended Methodist College Belfast and then the University of Ulster, where she graduated with a BA Honours degree in European studies. Brennan earned a scholarship to attend the College of Europe in Bruges, where she graduated with a master's degree in European political administration. After graduating from the College of Europe, Brennan started working as an intern at the Secretariat-General of the European Commission. Then, she became a political advisor at European Strategy, a Brussels-based consultancy firm. She speaks Spanish, French, and Italian.

Brennan then left Brussels to train at the Guildford School of Acting in Surrey and the Film Actors Studio in Dublin.

== Career ==
In 2007, Brennan starred as Regine Engstrand in the world premiere of Henrik Ibsen's Ghosts, in a new version by Frank McGuinness, directed by Robert Bowman at Bristol Old Vic. That same year, she also starred as Helen in the Irish premiere of Owen McCafferty's Scenes from the Big Picture, directed by Conall Morrison for Primecut Productions.

In 2009, Brennan played Rebecca Loos in the world premiere of Macbecks at the Olympia Theatre, Dublin. The musical saga was directed by David Bolger for MCD and LongRoad Productions and later transferred to the Cork Opera House. She also starred as Seaneen Molloy in the BBC Radio 4 drama Do's and Don'ts for the Mentally Interesting, directed by Fiona Kelcher in 2009. This Louise Ramsden adaptation is based on the blog The Secret Life of a Manic Depressive and is an account of learning to live with bipolar disorder.

The year 2010 saw Brennan tread the boards of The Gate Theatre in Arthur Miller's masterpiece Death of a Salesman, directed by David Esbjornson with Harris Yulin playing Willy Loman.

In 2011, Brennan was cast in her first television role. She played Frances in the BBC thriller Hidden, a role which propelled her into the spotlight.

From 2013 to 2016, she starred as Liz Tyler in The Fall alongside Jamie Dornan and Gillian Anderson. The Fall was originally broadcast on the BBC and RTÉ before being picked up by Amazon Prime and Netflix.

In 2014, Brennan voiced the documentary True North – Children's Hospice for the BBC. The film follows families caring for children with complex medical needs with the support of the Northern Ireland Children's Hospice.

The year 2015 saw Brennan star in two substantial film roles. The first was Paul McGuigan's Girona, which saw her play the role of Sophie opposite John Hannah. The second was as Dr Jaqui Finch in Dare to be Wild, directed by Vivienne De Courcy.

Brennan returned to the stage in 2016 starring as Elizabeth Corr in Belfast Rising at the Lyric Theatre, Belfast, before playing Claudia in the musical comedy Ché Guevara's Night Off at the Waterfront Concert Hall in Belfast later that year. Later in 2016, Brennan played Winifred Carney for the BBC in Voices 16 Rising.

In 2017, she took on the lead role of Tania in the world premiere of Marie Jones' hit comedy Sinners at the Lyric Theatre, directed by Mick Gordon. Then in 2018, Brennan appeared as Janet in Come Home for the BBC. She went on to play Carmen in Hugh Stoddart's Gibraltar Strait for the Brassneck Theatre Company at The Mac Belfast, later in 2018.

In 2019, she starred as the American Consul's wife Anna McVeigh in the Netflix original drama Hache alongside Javier Rey and Adriana Ugarte. Set in the 1960s, the series involved a bilingual script in both English and Spanish and was filmed in Barcelona. Hache drew inspiration from true events, unfolding against the backdrop of the heroin trafficking business amidst a world of violence and allure.

Brennan starred in A Quarrell with Myself in 2021 under the direction of Paula McFetridge for Kabosh Theatre Company. Later in 2021, she starred as Katharine Mary in the radio drama Bog Girls by Louise Farr, directed by Michael Shannon for BBC Radio 4. Then, she starred in Oestrogen City, an original short play specially commissioned by BBC Radio 4 from the writer by Rosemary Jenkinson.

In 2022, she starred as Rose Dugdale in the documentary The Heiress and the General for BBC Radio. An account of the robbery at Russborough House in County Wicklow in 1974, The Heiress And The General won Best Documentary at the IMRO Radio Awards. It was also announced in 2022 that Brennan had been cast in This Town, the major new drama from Steven Knight, directed by Paul Whittington.

In 2023, Brennan starred as Mary in the five part sci-fi radio drama Bitter Pill by Michael Patrick and Oisín Kearney for BBC Radio 4. Bitter Pill is an audio drama series following Mary's trauma after a dreadful car crash and her journey through a clinical drug trial that hopes to cure her PTSD.

== Awards ==
Year	Award	Note
2011	Belfast Telegraph Woman of the Year	Arts category

== Personal life ==
Brennan has been married to long-term boyfriend Ben Fetherston since September 2015.
