= People, Places and Things =

2015 play by Duncan Macmillan

- Original language: English
- Written by: Duncan Macmillan
- Subject: Addiction
- Genre: Drama

Premiere
- Date: August 25, 2015
- Place: Dorfman Theatre

People, Places and Things is a play by the British playwright Duncan Macmillan.

== Plot ==
=== Act 1 ===
Emma, a talented theatre actress, collapses during rehearsals for a staging of The Seagull by Chekhov, due to the abuse of alcohol and drugs; the company she works for dismisses her and requires her to detox in order to return to acting. Unwillingly, Emma checks in a rehabilitation clinic, initially determined to stay there only for the time necessary to be declared clean and return to work, but she ends up staying there for several months.

After a long and difficult drug treatment, Emma begins to interact with the community of the clinic. Some nurses and doctors are in fact ex-patients, who serve there in order of remain under observation; this is the case of nurse Foster, who immediately takes Emma in sympathy. Even the doctor who has her in treatment (who looks disturbingly similar to Emma's mother) is particularly interested in her case, and offers her a singular method of self-help that leads the patient to directly facing people, places and things that trigger their addiction. Emma agrees to try the method despite her strong skepticism, which leads her to reject for a long time the group sessions provided by the program.

Some time later, Emma has completed much of the program, but she cannot be declared clean unless she attends the group sessions; she is therefore forced to take part. Her new psychotherapist pushes her to talk openly about the traumas that fostered her addiction. She responds by employing her acting skills to tell falsified, unlikely stories (in which, however, fragments of truth are hidden). This draws the hostility of Mark, another patient. The situation worsens when Paul breaks in, being a former patient who was kicked out for bringing heroin into the clinic. Paul tries to apologize to the group, and tells Emma that he had begun to take drugs after his partner died of an overdose. Though the other patients oppose the idea of readmitting him, Emma vehemently emphasizes the group's hypocrisy, which causes a fight. In turn, the psychotherapist threatens to expel her too, which would make it impossible for Emma to be officially complete the program and return to work.

Emma decides to continue attending the group sessions, during which patients can practise – this involves staging moments outside of rehab, preparing to confront the triggers and causes of their addictions. Emma stubbornly refuses to take part in the practise, despite Mark's insistence (who, after his initial reluctance, sincerely longs to help her). With him, Emma opens up for the first time: she reveals her real name, Sarah; she tells him about her beloved brother who, despite leading a much more stable life than her, had died from a cerebral hemorrhage; she talks about her poor relationship with parents. She says that she chose to be an actress so she could live many wonderful lives instead of her own miserable one. She then compares her experience in the clinic to the theatre, insinuating that neither will save her.

Some time later, Mark is declared as recovered and allowed to leave the clinic. During a celebration in his honour, Emma lashes out suddenly and confesses the same truths she had revealed to Mark, to all her companions. Taken aback at her prolific lies, the group rejects her. Emma then leaves the clinic and relapses, getting drunk at a nightclub before collapsing.

=== Act 2 ===
Two months after her relapse, Emma has fallen back into the throes of her addictions, and returns to the clinic to begin rehab anew. This time, however, she appears more humble and committed. She notes many changes in clinic and its community since her departure: Mark has become a nurse, replacing Foster, who died after relapsing into drug addiction; Paul finds comfort in religion, which nevertheless prompts him to drink even more. Her new doctor initially appears hostile to her, and both she and Mark doubt that Emma will ever fully recover because of her refusal to face her trauma.

Emma proves to be very cooperative and confides again in Mark, telling him that she wound up with an acting career purely by chance; her first role was at a corporate event, during which she performed a trivial motivational speech. She admits that she has never really faced the death of her brother, and that she wants the approval of her mother, who has always opposed her choices. Eventually, Emma even agrees to stage a confrontation with her parents during a group practise session. For the first time, Emma role-plays confronting them and admits her discomfort about the situation, which leads the doctor to declare her recovered.

Having completed rehab, Emma returns to her parents' house and tries to replicate the confrontation she staged in the clinic, but her attempt quickly goes sour. Her father does not believe her and attacks her selfishness, and says that Emma should have died instead of her brother. Her mother believes that Emma will never be able to escape the clutches of her addictions, but has kept all the drugs that Emma had asked her to dispose of when she re-entered treatment. Emma is therefore condemned to remain with people, places and things that cause her addiction.

In the last scene, Emma slurs through the same motivational speech that began her acting career.

== Production history ==
The inaugural production was directed by Jeremy Herrin and staged in the Dorfman Theatre at the National Theatre in London in 2015. The play was widely praised by critics for its depiction of addiction, and Denise Gough, in the central role, won the Critics Circle Theatre Award for Best Actress. The production transferred to Wyndham's Theatre in 2016. Denise Gough won the Olivier Award for Best Actress for her role. The production toured the UK with Lisa Dwyer Hogg as Emma from September 2017 and transferred with Gough to St. Ann's Warehouse in New York City in October 2017.

The play returned to the West End in 2024 for a 14-week run at the Trafalgar Theatre, with Denise Gough reprising her role as Emma.

== Awards and nominations ==
Year	Award	Category	Nominee	Result
2015	Critics' Circle Theatre Award	Best Actress	Denise Gough	Won
2016	Laurence Olivier Award	Best New Play		Nominated
2016	Laurence Olivier Award	Best Actress in a Play	Denise Gough	Won
2016	Laurence Olivier Award	Best Sound Design	Tom Gibbons	Won
2016	Laurence Olivier Award	Best Lighting Design	James Farncombe	Nominated
2016	WhatsOnStage Award	Best New Play		Nominated
2016	WhatsOnStage Award	Best Actress in a Play	Denise Gough	Nominated
2018	Drama Desk Award	Outstanding Play		Nominated
2018	Drama Desk Award	Outstanding Actress in a Play	Denise Gough	Nominated
2018	Drama Desk Award	Outstanding Featured Actress in a Play	Barbara Marten	Nominated
2018	Drama Desk Award	Outstanding Director of a Play	Jeremy Herrin	Nominated
2018	Drama Desk Award	Outstanding Scenic Design of a Play	Bunny Christie	Nominated
2018	Drama Desk Award	Outstanding Sound Design in a Play	Tom Gibbons	Nominated
2018	Drama Desk Award	Outstanding Projection Design	Andrzej Goulding	Nominated
