= Five Minutes of Heaven =

- Promotional film poster
- Directed by: Oliver Hirschbiegel
- Written by: Guy Hibbert
- Produced by: Eoin O'Callaghan; Stephen Wright
- Starring: Liam Neeson; James Nesbitt
- Cinematography: Ruairi O'Brien
- Edited by: Hans Funck
- Music by: David Holmes
- Production companies: Big Fish Films; Element Pictures; Ruby Films
- Distributed by: BBC Television (United Kingdom); IFC Films (United States); Pathé (worldwide)
- Release dates: 19 January 2009 (Sundance); 27 February 2009 (Ireland)
- Running time: 90 minutes
- Countries: United Kingdom; Ireland
- Languages: English; Irish
- Box office: $87,906

Five Minutes of Heaven is a 2009 film directed by Oliver Hirschbiegel from a script by Guy Hibbert. The film premiered on 19 January 2009 at the 25th Sundance Film Festival where it won the World Cinema Dramatic Directing Award for Hirschbiegel, and the World Cinema Screenwriting Award for Hibbert. As a television film it was broadcast on BBC Two on 5 April 2009, and also had an international feature film release.

The first part reconstructs the historical killing of 19-year-old Jim Griffin by 17-year-old Alistair Little in 1975, and the second part depicts a fictional meeting between Little and Griffin's brother Joe 33 years later.

== Plot ==
In Lurgan, Northern Ireland, during 1975 and the Northern Irish Troubles, the Irish Republican Army are targeting loyalists; in turn, the loyalist Ulster Volunteer Force are exacting revenge on Catholics they claim are militant republicans. Alistair Little, 17, is the leader of a UVF cell, eager to let blood. He and his gang are given the go-ahead to kill a young Catholic man, James Griffin, as a reprisal and a warning to others. When they kill Griffin, his 8-year old little brother, Joe watches in horror. Little is arrested and sentenced to prison for 12 years.

In 2008—thirty-three years after the murder and nineteen years after Little is released from prison—Little and Joe Griffin have been set up to meet on camera by a reconciliation project. Little has served his sentence and peace has been agreed to in Northern Ireland, but Joe Griffin is not coming on the programme for a handshake. He is carrying a knife and intends to murder his brother's killer during the meeting. However, just before he is to go on camera, he becomes extremely agitated and demands that the cameras be removed. When the producers try to calm him, he leaves, and the two men do not meet.

Little offers to meet Griffin, and Griffin accepts. Griffin asks Little to meet him at Griffin's childhood home, now abandoned and boarded up, where Little murdered his brother. As Griffin reaches for the knife before the meeting, his wife tries to stop him, but he pushes her to the floor. At the meeting, Griffin, full of hate and wanting vengeance, attacks Little from behind and attempts to stab him. In the struggle, they fall through a second story window. Both are hurt. Little tells Griffin that he is leaving for Belfast. He explains why he killed Griffin's brother. He tells Griffin to "get rid of me", to tell his family that he has killed Little and to live his life for them, not for vengeance.

Griffin very shakily lights up a cigarette as Little pulls himself from the wall he was sitting against and limps down the road. Soon after, Griffin attends a therapy group and tells them, crying, that he wants to be a good father for his daughters. He calls Little and tells him, "We're finished." Little appears happy and befuddled, not quite sure what to do next.

== Cast ==
(in order of appearance)

- Mark Davison as Young Alistair Little
- Diarmuid Noyes as Andy
- Niamh Cusack as Alistair's Mum
- Matthew McElhinney as Stuart
- Conor MacNeill as Dave
- Paul Garret as Alistair's Dad
- Kevin O' Neill as Young Joe Griffin
- Gerard Jordan as Jim Griffin
- Paula McFetridge as Gene Griffin, Joe's Mum
- James Nesbitt as Adult Joe Griffin
- Barry McEvoy as Joe's Chauffeur
- Liam Neeson as Adult Alistair Little
- Richard Orr as Alistair's Chauffeur
- Richard Dormer as Michael
- Anamaria Marinca as Vika
- Jonathan Harden as David

== Production ==
Five Minutes of Heaven was originally commissioned by BBC Four, as Hibbert did not want television executives to interfere with the script. BBC Four abandoned the project when they could not provide a bigger budget. To get more money for the film, independent production company Big Fish Films brought in other financial backers, including Northern Ireland Screen, and the film was eventually commissioned by Controller of BBC Two Roly Keating, and BBC Controller of Fiction Jane Tranter.

Filming took place on location in Belfast, Dundonald, Lurgan, Glenarm and Newtownards for four weeks from May to June 2008. Nesbitt met Griffin before filming began but Neeson decided to wait until after it had concluded before meeting Little; he said "I didn't want to see him before because I didn't want to be reminded of the physical differences between us and I didn't want to get that cluttered up in my head."

This was also the first time that two of Northern Ireland's top actors, Liam Neeson and James Nesbitt, had starred in a film together.

== Release ==
Five Minutes of Heaven premiered at the 2009 Sundance Film Festival on 19 January 2009. It won in the World Cinema Directed Award: Dramatic, and World Cinema Screenwriting Award categories. It received its Irish premiere at the 2009 Jameson Dublin International Film Festival on 21 February 2009. A screening was given by the British Academy of Film and Television Arts in London on 23 March 2009. It was followed by a question-and-answer session with Hirschbiegel, Hibbert and Nesbitt. It was broadcast on BBC Two in England, Scotland and Wales on 5 April 2009 and on BBC One Northern Ireland on 13 April. Pathé holds worldwide theatrical distribution rights.

IFC Films signed a deal to distribute the film in the United States from August 2009, theatrically, through its video on demand service, and exclusively through Blockbuster retailers. The film opened at the Angelika Film Center in New York on 21 August 2009. It took $5,200 in box office receipts on its first weekend.

== Reception ==
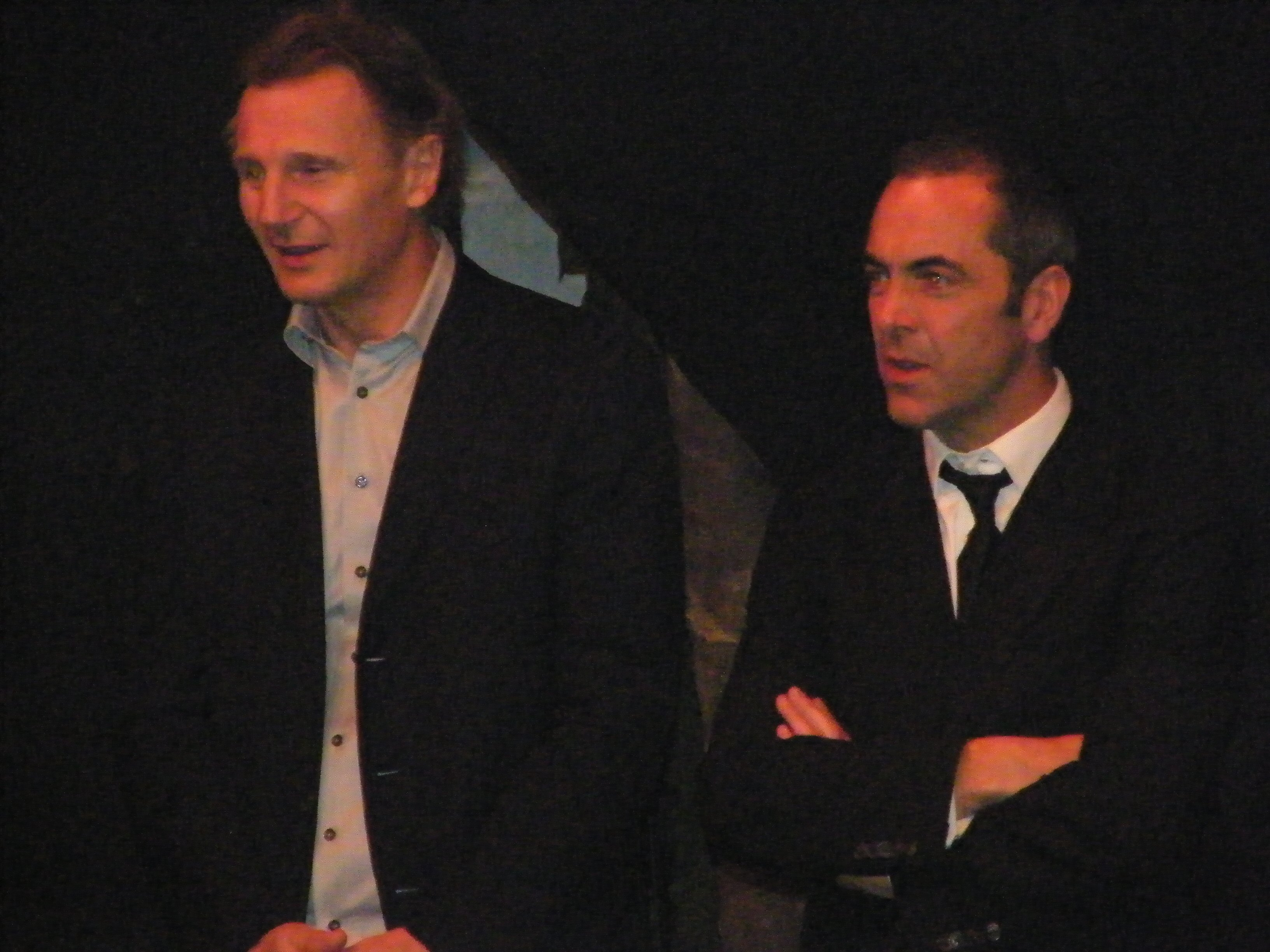
Neeson and Nesbitt in January 2008

The film received positive reviews from film critics. As of June 2020, the film holds a 75% approval rating on review aggregation website Rotten Tomatoes, based on 44 reviews with an average rating of 6.56 out of 10. The website's critics consensus reads: "Oliver Hirschbiegel's dramatic take on "The Troubles" is an actor's showcase—and Liam Neeson and James Nesbitt are more than up to the challenge." The film also won the Christopher Ewart-Biggs Memorial Prize.

After Five Minutes of Heaven's Sundance screenings, Kirk Honeycutt of The Hollywood Reporter called it "very good at stating the obvious but fails to bring new insight to this age-old morality tale". He cited the scenes featuring Mark Davison (as the young Little) and Anamaria Marinca (as a television producer) as "the only time the movie sparks to life". Dennis Harvey for Variety was complimentary of Hibbert's screenplay and of Neeson's acting.

Padraic Geoghegan of RTÉ Entertainment criticized the lack of screen-time given to Griffin's family, and for not showing how Little came to be helping others like him in the present-day scenes. Geoghegan praised the flashback scenes, Hirschbeigel's direction, and Neeson and Nesbitt's acting. The Irish Times' Michael Dwyer rated the film four out of five stars. Of the acting, he wrote,

Nesbitt vividly portrays Griffin as a man still coiled with rage and horror by indelible memories of a living nightmare when he was a boy. And Neeson’s haunted features reveal the guilt and pain Little has carried since he committed his terrible crime.

Andrew Johnston for Culture Northern Ireland wrote,

Unlike some other Ulster-set pictures, Five Minutes of Heaven presents real people with real emotions, rather than political caricatures or slavish impersonations. There’s a slight sense that most of the budget went on securing Neeson, but the minimalist soundtrack, grotty colour scheme and amateurish fight scenes help underline the emptiness of the lead characters and the desolation of their predicament.

=== Awards ===
Year	Award	Category	Nominee	Result
2009	Sundance Film Festival	World Cinema, Directed: Dramatic	Oliver Hirschbiegel	Won
2009	Sundance Film Festival	World Cinema, Screenwriting	Guy Hibbert	Won
2009	Sundance Film Festival	Grand Jury Prize	Oliver Hirschbiegel	Nominated
2010	Irish Film and Television Academy Awards	Single Drama/Drama Serial	Eoin O'Callaghan	Won
2010	Irish Film and Television Academy Awards	Actor in a Lead Role: Television	Liam Neeson	Nominated
2010	Irish Film and Television Academy Awards	Director of Photography	Ruairí O'Brien	Nominated
2010	Royal Television Society Programme Awards	Best Single Drama	Five Minutes of Heaven	Won
2010	Royal Television Society Programme Awards	Best Writer (Drama)	Guy Hibbert	Nominated
2010	Broadcasting Press Guild Awards	Best Single Drama	Five Minutes of Heaven	Nominated
2010	Broadcasting Press Guild Awards	Best Actor	James Nesbitt	Nominated
2010	British Academy Television Craft Awards	Writer	Guy Hibbert	Won
2010	British Academy Television Awards	Best Single Drama	Guy Hibbert, Oliver Hirschbiegel, Eoin O'Callaghan, Stephen Wright	Nominated
