= Too Close (TV series) =

2021 ITV television miniseries directed by Susan Tully

- Also known as: Under the Skin
- Genre: Drama
- Based on: Too Close
- Written by: Clara Salaman
- Directed by: Susan Tully
- Starring: Emily Watson; Denise Gough
- Composer: Jack Halama
- Country of origin: United Kingdom
- Original language: English
- No. of episodes: 3

Production
- Executive producers: Neil Blair; Kate Crowe; Ruth Kenley-Letts; Clara Salaman; Jenny Van Der Lande; Emily Watson
- Producer: Letitia Knight
- Production companies: Snowed-In Productions; All3Media International

Original release
- Network: ITV
- Release: 12 April – 14 April 2021

Too Close, also known as Under the Skin, is a 2021 British three-part drama television miniseries directed by Susan Tully and based on the 2018 novel written by Clara Salaman under the pen name Natalie Daniels. The series follows Dr. Emma Robertson as she assesses the sanity of 'yummy mummy' Connie Mortensen, accused of attempted murder. For their performances, both Emily Watson and Denise Gough were nominated for the BAFTA TV Award for Best Actress in 2022.

== Plot ==
Forensic psychiatrist Dr Emma Robertson is assigned to assess the sanity of 'yummy mummy' Connie Mortensen, accused of the attempted murder of two children. Robertson begins to feel sympathetic towards Mortensen, who claims to be suffering from dissociative amnesia.

== Cast ==
=== Main characters ===
| Actor | Character | Character description | Ref. |
|---|---|---|---|
| Emily Watson | Dr Emma Robertson | Forensic psychiatrist assigned to the Mortensen case. | |
| Denise Gough | Connie Mortensen | Robertson's patient, labelled the 'yummy mummy monster' in the press. | |
| Thalissa Teixeira | Vanessa "Ness" Jones | Connie's friend. | |
| Risteárd Cooper | Si Robertson | Emma's husband and a barrister. | |
| Jamie Sives | Karl Mortensen | Connie's husband. | |
| Nina Wadia | Dr Anita Rhys Evans | Local woman featured in flashbacks. | |
| Karl Johnson | James de Cadenet | Connie's father. | |
| Eileen Davies | Julia De Cadenet | Connie's mother. | |

=== Minor characters ===
- Thea Barrett as Polly
- Henry Helm as Josh Mortensen
- Isabelle Mullally as Annie Mortensen
- Ariyon Bakare as Dougie Thompson
- Madeleine Demetriou as Abigail Robertson
- Adrian Hood as Kenneth Baines
- Islah Abdur-Rahman as Nav
- Grace Calder as Savannah
- Delainey Hayles as Billie
- Jackie Clune as Leah

== Production ==
ITV commissioned the series, based on a novel by Clara Salaman under the pen name "Natalie Daniels", in September 2019. The series was produced by Snowed-In Productions. Too Close was filmed on location in London and Kent, with scenes between Watson and Gough filmed at HM Prison Holloway. Writer Salaman and lead actress Watson are old friends.

== Release ==
The series first aired in the United Kingdom, from 12 to 14 April 2021 on ITV. All3Media International handled the international sales of the series. Too Close premiered on AMC+ in the United States on 20 May 2021. The series premiered in Finland on Yle TV1 under the title Under the Skin (Finnish: Ihon alle, Swedish: Under huden) on 9 May 2021.

== Reception ==
=== Critical ===
Critical reception to the series in the United Kingdom was positive. Lucy Mangan gave the series five out of five stars. The London Evening Standard's Katie Rosseinsky and The Independent's Ed Cumming rated the series four out of five stars. John Anderson of The Wall Street Journal praised Tully's direction and the performances of Watson and Gough.

=== Public ===
The ITV premiere drew 4.8 million viewers, a 20.6 percent share of the viewing market.
