= Hang (play) =

2015 play

hang is a play by British playwright debbie tucker green that premiered at the Royal Court Theatre in 2015.

== Synopsis ==
Three unnamed characters are present in the same room. One and Two are overseeing a judicial process, while Three, a Black woman, is determining the fate of a man who has committed a crime against her and her family. Over the course of the play, Three must decide what punishment the man will face and read a letter written by the perpetrator.

== Productions ==
The 2015 production of hang was directed by debbie tucker green on a set designed by Jon Bausor. The set was all-black and illuminated only by fluorescent lights. The performers were Marianne Jean-Baptiste, Claire Rushbrook, and Shane Zaza.

The show received a Canadian production in 2018 at the Obsidian Theatre in Toronto. The production was directed by Philip Akin, choreographed by Kimberley Rampersad, and starred Zoe Doyle, Vladimir Alexis, and Sarah Afful. Also in 2018, the Remy Bumppo Theatre Company hosted a Chicago production, which was directed by Keira Fromm and starred Annabel Armour, Eleni Pappageorge, and Patrese D. McClain.

In 2022 the play was produced at the Tron Theatre in Glasgow with a cast of Saskia Ashdown, Pauline Goldsmith and Renee Williams. It was directed by Kolbrún Björt Sigfúsdóttir.

== Response ==
The 2015 production received mixed reviews from critics. Michael Billington and Susannah Clapp, both writing in The Guardian, directed praise at the performances but criticized the dialogue for being overly-stylized and Three's characterization for being single-note. The Independent also gave it a mixed review, saying that Jean-Baptiste gave "a performance of extraordinary power" but criticizing the mysterious nature of the crime. The Arts Desk described the ambiguity of the play as "frustrating and annoying" and said that without a resolution the show felt more like a lecture than a performance.Londonist agreed, characterizing the back-and-forth dialogue in the first third of the play as "painful" and saying that the play's core conceit was thought-provoking but lacked drama.

The Financial Times was also critical, praising the performances and the play for evoking a "Kafkaesque" feeling but describing the precise dialogue as being at odds with the vagueness of the story. By contrast, WhatsOnStage was more positive, noting that the play had a surprising amount of humor and that the set was evocative. The New York Times praised Jean-Baptiste's performance and concluded that the play was potent and timely, while the Evening Standard wrote that tucker green's script covered "more than most other writers could manage in double" the time. HuffPost was extremely positive, praising the set design, the performances, and the overall mystery of the play.

Michael Pearce, a theater researcher at the University of Exeter, situates race as the central theme of hang, noting that Three is described as a Black woman in the script and that the unnamed perpetrator is implied to be white. Pearce draws connections between Three's anger throughout the piece and the concept of "Black rage," writing that hang is part of a tradition of Black art focused on anger. Three's rage, Pearce says, is signified by "a slight, nervous tremble in her hand" that reveals the crime's trauma as being present even years after the crime.
