= Hache (TV series) =

Spanish television series

- Genre: Crime drama
- Created by: Verónica Fernández
- Written by: Carlos López; Santos Mercero; Almudena Ocaña
- Directed by: Jorge Torregrossa; Fernando Trullols (season 1); Vibhav Shikdar (series)
- Starring: Adriana Ugarte; Eduardo Noriega; Javier Rey; Séainín Brennan
- Country of origin: Spain
- Original language: Spanish
- No. of seasons: 2
- No. of episodes: 14

Production
- Executive producers: Tomás Cimadevilla; Verónica Fernández; Jorge Iglesias
- Cinematography: Julián Elizalde
- Editors: Paco Díaz; Irene Blecua
- Running time: 40-52 minutes
- Production company: Weekend Studio

Original release
- Network: Netflix
- Release: 1 November 2019 – 5 February 2021

Hache is a Spanish crime drama television series created by Verónica Fernández. The series is set in the world of drug trafficking in the Barcelona of the 60s, and it stars Adriana Ugarte, along with Eduardo Noriega, and Javier Rey. The first season is composed of 8 episodes of one hour, and became available for streaming worldwide on Netflix on 1 November 2019. On 21 November 2019 it was confirmed that the series had been renewed for a second season, which premiered on 5 February 2021. In July 2021, the series was canceled after two seasons.

== Cast ==
- Adriana Ugarte as Helena Olaya a.k.a. Hache
- Eduardo Noriega as Inspector Alejandro Vinuesa
- Javier Rey as Salvador Malpica
- Séainín Brennan as Anna McVeigh
- Marc Martínez as Arístides
- Ingrid Rubio as Celeste
- Pep Ambròs as Julio Senovilla
- Tony Zenet as Ramiro Larrocha
- Josep Julien as Eladio Pérez
- Marina Salas as Silvia Velasco
- Àlex Casanovas as Clemente Larrubia
- Andrew Tarbet as Walter Kopinski
- Tonia Richardson as Julia Bloomsbury
- Núria Prims as Camino
- Samuel Viyuela as Mateo
- Anna Moliner as Mirta
- Marcel Borràs as Ventura

== Episodes ==
Series	Episodes	Originally released
1	8	1 November 2019
2	6	5 February 2021

=== Season 1 (2019) ===
No. overall	No. in series	Title	English title	Original release date
1	1	"Muñecas flotando en el mar"	"Dolls Floating at Sea"	1 November 2019
Helena takes to extreme measures to seduce drug lord Malpica and get funds to free her partner from jail. Vinuesa investigates a string of murders.
2	2	"El primer trabajo"	"The First Job"	1 November 2019
Vinuesa begins tying the murders to heroin. Caruso triggers Malpica's jealousy. Helena, now Hache, attempts to hide her daughter from her new lover.
3	3	"El combate"	"The Bout"	1 November 2019
Hache starts gaining Malpica's trust and secures more responsibility in his organization. An anonymous call focuses Vinuesa's attention on the port.
4	4	"El beso de la muerte"	"The Kiss of Death"	1 November 2019
Malpica and his men search for a missing Anna ahead of an important meeting. Vinuesa refuses to be distracted by the shooting.
5	5	"Venganza"	"Vengeance"	1 November 2019
Malpica frantically tries to free Hache as she and the port director are interrogated about the blackmail incident. Vinuesa is given frustrating orders.
6	6	"Marsella"	"Marseille"	1 November 2019
Hache makes an impression on Luciano when Malpica brings her on a business trip to Marseille. Bruno looks for his family. Celeste voices her ambition.
7	7	"El tiovivo"	"The Carousel"	1 November 2019
Bruno pressures Hache to move to Argentina, but she feels conflicted. Malpica orders Kopinski to commit a serious crime.
8	8	"Helena con H"	"Helena with an H"	1 November 2019
The person who betrayed Malpica is discovered and tortured. Hache mourns her loss with anger and plans for vengeance.

=== Season 2 (2021) ===
No. overall	No. in series	Title	English title	Original release date
9	1	"La herencia"	The Inheritance	5 February 2021
10	2	"El laboratorio"	The Laboratory	5 February 2021
11	3	"Ojo por ojo"	Eye for an Eye	5 February 2021
12	4	"Soledades"	Solitudes	5 February 2021
13	5	"Tiene que morir"	She Must Die	5 February 2021
14	6	"Lo mejor para ti"	The Best for You	5 February 2021

== Awards and nominations ==
Year	Award	Category	Nominee(s)	Result	Ref.
2021	8th MiM Series Awards	Best Drama Series		Nominated	
2021	8th MiM Series Awards	Best Drama Actor	Javier Rey	Won	
