= Raw (TV series) =

Irish drama television series

- Season 2 logo
- Created by: Lisa McGee, based on an idea by Simon Ashdown.
- Developed by: Ecosse Films & Octagon Films
- Starring: Charlene McKenna; Kryštof Hádek; Dominique McElligott; Liam Garrigan; Damon Gameau; Keith McErlean; Shelley Conn; Michael Colgan; Kelly Gough
- Composer: Ray Harman
- Country of origin: Ireland
- Original language: English
- No. of seasons: 5
- No. of episodes: 30

Production
- Producer: Michael Parke
- Running time: 60 mins (including commercials)

Original release
- Network: RTÉ Two (season 1); RTÉ One (seasons 2–5)
- Release: 8 September 2008 – 10 February 2013

RAW is an Irish drama television series that was broadcast on RTÉ. The show focuses on the staff at a Dublin restaurant. The first season featured six episodes shown on RTÉ Two in September 2008 and the second season of six episodes was shown on RTÉ One from 10 January 2010. The third season of six episodes was broadcast on RTÉ One from 9 January 2011. Season 4 was broadcast on RTÉ One from Sunday, 8 January 2012. Season 5 began on RTÉ One on Sunday, 6 January 2013 at 21:30, while also available on RTÉ One+1 at 22:30 and RTÉ Player.

== Production ==
RAW, Season 1 logo

The series was created and written by Derry writer Lisa McGee, based on an idea by Simon Ashdown. Ashdown wrote the TV drama Kitchen for Channel Five, which was also set in a restaurant, and in which Charlene McKenna, who plays the protagonist of Raw, Jojo, also appeared (in a different role). However the plot and focus of Kitchen was substantially different from Raw. The first season was broadcast on RTÉ Two from Monday 8 September 2008 to 13 October 2008, while season two was broadcast on RTÉ One on Sundays from 10 January 2010. Filming for the second season took place on Camden Street in Dublin in March 2009. Season 3 broadcast on RTÉ One from Sunday, 9 January 2011 featuring six new episodes. Season 3 ended on 13 February 2011 on RTÉ One. Season 3 was the most successful season in terms of audience figures, reaching on average of 577,000 viewers per episode. Filming of Season 4 finished up production on Friday, 21 October 2011.

Season 5 of Raw began production on Monday, 20 August 2012, with the six episodes taking ten weeks to produce. Season 5 had new characters played by Irish actors Dermot Murphy and Michael Malarkey. Other newcomers included French-British actor Cristian Solimeno (from ITV drama Footballers Wives) and Scottish actress Amy Manson (from Being Human).

In April 2013, it was confirmed by RTÉ that Raw had come to an end and would not be renewed for another season. The show was reportedly canceled due to RTÉ being unable to afford to produce both Raw and Love/Hate. Raw had more than 600,000 viewers during season five. Prior to this announcement both Charlene McKenna and Damon Gameau had confirmed that they would not reprise their roles in further seasons. On the week beginning 15 April 2013, the cast and crew were informed of the show's cancellation. Some cast members had expected the show to return for another season.

== Cast ==
- Keith McErlean as Shane Harte (Season 1 – 5)
- Charlene McKenna as Jojo Harte (Season 1 – Season 5)
- Damon Gameau as Geoff Mitchell (Season 1- Season 5)
- Aisling O'Sullivan as Fiona Kelly (Season 2 – 5)
- Kelly Gough as Kate Kelly (Season 2 – 5)
- Ger Ryan as Maeve Harte (Season 2 – 5)
- Tara Lee as Emma Kelly (Season 4 – 5)
- Sam Keeley as Philip (Season 4 – 5)
- Dermot Crowley as Dan Kelly (Season 4 – 5)
- Amy Manson as Zoe (Season 5)
- Cristian Solimeno as Max (Season 5)
- Mark Lambert as Des Harte (Season 5)
- Dermot Murphy as Brian (Season 5)
- Katie Lowe (season 5)
- Kryštof Hádek as Pavel Rebien (Season 1 – Season 4)
- Michael Colgan as Mal Martin (Season 1)
- Shelley Conn as Tanya Martin (Season 1)
- Liam Garrigan as Bobby Breen (Season 1 – Season 3)
- Dominique McElligott as Rebecca Marsh (Season 1)
- Paul Reid as Dylan (Season 2 – Season 3)
- Joe Doyle as Richard O'Donnell (Season 1 – Season 3)
- James Akpotor as Tiny (Season 1 – Season 3)
- Montserrat Lombard as Selena (Season 4)
- Brian Doherty as Ed (Season 4 – Season 5)
- Nick Lee as Jay (Season 2)
- Michael Malarkey as Anthony (Season 5)

== Synopsis ==
=== Season 1 ===
Season 1
Episode 1	Jojo is a young Monaghan chef working in a Dublin restaurant, Raw. Her brother Shane (a former lawyer) takes a job at the restaurant. The restaurant is celebrating its first anniversary but there is no sign of co-owner and head chef, Mal, whose wife and co-owner Tanya is the restaurant manager. Geoff, the Australian deputy head chef, finds himself in charge for the important night, at which an Irish Times critic is reviewing the restaurant. Meanwhile, Jojo's best friend, Bobby, is threatened by two drug dealers, whose drugs Jojo had dumped earlier in the episode, and finds himself in need of €4000 quickly.
Episode 2	Jojo and Bobby plan a house party, but first they need to acquire alcohol. They enlist Pavel's assistance in taking some from the restaurant. Mal plans to work late, but ends up attending the party and drinking with Shane, much to Tanya's annoyance. Rebecca attempts to be alone with Bobby at the party, but her boyfriend David follows her there. Geoff and Pavel share a drink and drug-fuelled conversation.
Episode 3	It is a very wet day and so most people have cancelled their reservations. Geoff demands a pay rise that Tanya can't afford, so she considers firing someone else to pay for it. It is Mal's birthday and he takes cocaine and causes a disruption in the kitchen. Bobby manages to turn Rebecca off by saying he doesn't want things to get serious. Shane and Tanya kiss, as do Geoff and Pavel, as the situation in the restaurant heats up. Shane's wife Anna arrives.
Episode 4	Geoff and Mal make peace and join forces in the kitchen. Shane and Anna decide to move in together and then scrap their plans when they argue over where to move. The argument ends with Anna walking out on Shane. The staff try to poison a customer whom they hate by putting cum in his desert. Jojo goes on a date with another woman and the pair end up kissing. However, the woman tells Jojo to go home and tell Bobby how she feels. Before Jojo can get a chance to tell this to Bobby, she finds out that he is back with Rebecca. Geoff and Pavel go out for a drink and Geoff invites Pavel back to his place. Pavel ends up telling Geoff that he is a virgin. The episode ends with Pavel naked in front of Geoff.
Episode 5	Geoff and Pavel are at the beginning of a relationship however Geoff wants their relationship to stay secret. Pavel does not want to stay quiet as he is not ashamed of being gay. They fight over the issue, but end up making up. Mal and Geoff have a huge argument as a result of Tanya not wanting Geoff to be a partner. Geoff tells Mal that Shane and Tanya were sleeping together after overhearing part of a conversation between Jojo and Shane, when really Shane and Tany just kissed. The argument results in Geoff walking out of the restaurant on a very busy night. Pavel follows him but Geoff says he is leaving for London in a few days and what happened between them was just sex and that Pavel should stop following him. Pavel is left standing in the alley and Mal and JoJo must finish the service without Geoff.
Episode 6	Jojo must cater Tanya's sister's wedding. Raw receives a positive review in a restaurant magazine, and Tanya ponders opening more restaurants. Meanwhile, Mal ponders his future, while Pavel and Geoff reconcile their differences, and kiss in front of everyone; many people are amazed that Pavel is gay. This episode marks the final appearances of Mal Martin (Michael Colgan), Tanya Martin (Shelley Conn) and Rebecca Marsh (Dominique McElligott).

=== Season 2 ===
Season 2
Episode 1	Since the first series ended, Raw closed down. In the season series' first episode, it is re-opened under new management of Fiona (Aisling O'Sullivan), who brings back all original staff. Jojo is promoted to sous-chef. Bobby reveals Rebecca has broken up with him and moved to America. Dylan (Paul Reid) is brought on as the new waiter, replacing Rebecca. While Shane is in the pub, he runs into old school friend Jay (Nick Lee). Jay and Shane end up fighting after Jay insults Jojo. On the night Raw re-opens, Jay comes to Raw and reveals he is now a member of the Gardaí and Shane is arrested. Fiona is seen with her planned business partner, whom she must blackmail about past financial dealings to secure his signature on Raw's new rent lease. This episode marks the first appearances of Fiona (Aisling O'Sullivan), Dylan (Paul Reid) and Jay (Nick Lee).
Episode 2	Jojo and Shane's mother arrives unexpectedly to stay with them for a week, and she fights with Jojo over her lack of communication, and with Shane over his downward spiral after his divorce. Jay asks Shane for a bribe and insists he wants more and more cash. Geoff helps Pavel with his confidence as he takes on the role of front of house manager. Jojo and Dylan grow closer after they become locked in the wine closet together but Shane gets drunk and Bobby interrupts them to ask Jojo to take him home. Jojo argues with her mother over Shane's decision making and how she makes her feel. Jojo's mother becomes upset and reveals she has breast cancer and is scheduled for a lumpectomy but refuses to tell her husband or Shane. Jojo confides in Dylan after her mother goes to hospital earlier than expected. Fiona meets her sister Kate, who refuses to have anything to do with her.
Episode 3	Raw is being reviewed in an up-class magazine and Geoff is given a well-presented profile article. The photographer at Raw captures a young girl's violent reaction to a nut allergy and puts it in a tabloid article. Jojo goes with her mother to receive the news that the cancer has not spread, and she decides to tell Shane. Jay breaks into Shane's apartment and goes through his things to try to get more money from him. Fiona gives Shane a month's wages in advance to clear his bribe. Geoff can't get the right food for the specials that Fiona wants, and he becomes annoyed when Pavel gets them for him through his new contacts. Dylan keeps Bobby with the idea of opening his own bar, and kisses Jojo in the park. The episode concludes with the entrances of Fiona's ex-husband, who is revealed to have slept with her sister, Kate.
Episode 4	Geoff's friend from Australia visits. We find out that he does not know that Geoff is gay (and knows nothing about his and Pavel's relationship). Pavel reacts badly when he finds out that Geoff has discarded a photo of the two of them. Geoff breaks off his and Pavel's relationship but soon regrets his decision and chooses to tell his friend from Australia that he is gay – this news is taken well and Geoff decides to introduce Pavel to him. Jojo finds out that her new relationship may be in trouble when she discovers that her boyfriend has a daughter. Jojo and Pavel decide to go out and drown their sorrows at a local gay bar and Pavel finds himself leaving with a stranger from the bar. Pavel wakes up naked in the stranger's bedroom and realizes his mistake. After Geoff introduces Pavel to his friend, Pavel decides to tell Geoff what he has done. Geoff reacts angrily. Also in the episode we see that Fiona and her husband's relationship may be on the mend, and Shane sleeps with Raw's wine supplier in her hotel room before she goes back to France.
Episode 5	Bobby and Dylan sign a lease on a bar. Geoff celebrates his 30th birthday but things don't go well – and his relationship with Pavel is at an all-time low and a bad review doesn't help. Fiona lets Paul know she cannot trust him and it is time for their marriage to end. Dylan tells Jojo that he is in love with her and she finds out that Jay is black-mailing Shane. Jojo gets set to deliver her own justice.
Episode 6	Bobby and Dylan find a dead man in their new bar and decide to hold the wake on the opening night. Fiona is furious that Pavel and Geoff are so sad and says it's creating a bad atmosphere, so Pavel asks Geoff if they can be friends and Geoff refuses. As all the staff go to Bobby and Dylan's opening night of the bar, Geoff returns home and tells his parents he is gay. Bobby tries to kiss Jojo, which infuriates her while Geoff shows up and tells Pavel they should be friends and they spend the night talking, dancing and having fun. Jojo returns to the kitchen to see where Shane is and finds the place smashed up, with Shane on the ground after refusing to fight Jay. The guards are called and Jay is arrested and all the raw staff return and clean up.

=== Season 3 ===
Season 3
Episode 1	Jojo and Dylan move into their new home.
Episode 2	Penelope arrives late to a business meeting and gets her first written warning.
Episode 3	Bobby runs away to London and asks Jojo to leave with him, but she refuses to leave Dylan. Dylan throws Jojo a birthday and the episode closes with Jojo asking Dylan to marry her. Dylan accepts.
Episode 4	Chantelle discovers the magic of the internet; Jojo falls over and bruises her shin badly.
Episode 5	
Episode 6	Jojo is planning to get married, but it turns out badly when she gets dumped.

=== Season 4 ===
Season 4
Episode 1	Fiona dislikes surprises, so her 40th birthday is a great time to spring one on her. Jojo is living with Kate and Shane and causing strife in all the bedrooms. She's has a late night but tries cover in the kitchen, without much success.
Episode 2	Kate and Shane arrive to chaos at the flat, and Jojo is sleeping on the sofa. There are now three people in this relationship and there's only room for two.
Episode 3	It's payback time for Jojo as last night's late one takes its toll. Selena's presence in RAW is making Geoff very nervous. What's her secret and when's she going to spill?
Episode 4	Waking up beside Philip frightened Jojo. Kate's milking the situation for all it's worth and loving it. Maeve sees there is more going on than meets the eye, but Jojo's not in the mood for any maternal advice.
Episode 5	The wages of sin are guilt and Kate's got bucketloads of it. Despite everyone's best efforts, Jojo is in freefall.
Episode 6	Now Jojo's been fired she attempts to make amends for her attitude at RAW. Geoff accepts her apology and offers her a chance to start over. Shane and Kate struggle to work together now that Shane knows about her deceit. Geoff and Pavel plan to leave Ireland and set up a restaurant in Prague, leaving Jojo in charge with Pip as her second. Pavel's recent fall has devastating consequences for the couple's future plans. The episode ends on a cliff-hanger.

=== Season 5 ===
Season 5
Episode 1	Jojo returns with a new husband, but has she married the right man?
Episode 2	It's Emma's 18th birthday party. Meanwhile, Kate's enduring a loved-up Shane and Zoe, and not liking it one bit.
Episode 3	Launch night for Kate's new pop-up. Who could say no to free champagne? Anthony's got a honeymoon idea for Jojo, so why is she less than enthusiastic?
Episode 4	Fiona is overjoyed that Geoff is back, so that she can finally see the back of Max, but is surprised when Geoff has other ideas.
Episode 5	Geoff is trying his best to block the anniversary of Pavel's death but not doing a very good job of it. And Shane's in a debt spiral – all of his own making.
Episode 6	Geoff has a decision to make which will affect everyone at RAW, and he has a surprising arrival to help him.

== Music ==
Music from Irish artists features heavily on the show; artists who have featured on the show include: Autamata, Camille O'Sullivan, The Flaws, Lisa Hannigan, Fight Like Apes, The Coronas, Ham Sandwich, Royseven, Róisín Murphy, Two Door Cinema Club, Cathy Davey, The Chapters, Bell X1, Gemma Hayes, Heathers, The Pogues, Ryan Sheridan and others.

== Reception ==
Quentin Fottrell of The Irish Times felt the show was as "outdated misreading of its target demographic" and concluded "Raw has a pretty screwed-up view of Young Ireland."

For the Irish Independent, Pat Stacey wrote that "Raw tastes stale and over-cooked."

== DVD releases ==
DVD name	Region 1	Region 2	Region 4
Raw – Series 1	–	27 October 2008	–
