= Pulling Moves =

Television series from Northern Ireland

- Genre: Comedy drama
- Country of origin: Northern Ireland
- No. of episodes: 10

Original release
- Network: BBC Three, BBC Northern Ireland
- Release: 5 March – 2 April 2004

Pulling Moves is a Northern Irish television series set in Lenadoon, West Belfast. It follows the exploits of four friends: Wardrobe (Simon Delaney), Ta (Ciarán McMenamin), Shay (Ciaran Nolan) and Darragh (Kevin Elliot). The series first aired on BBC Northern Ireland in 2003 and aired nationwide on BBC Three, running for one series of ten episodes.

== Premise ==
Set in Belfast. Each episode follows the group as they try different scams to earn money.

== Episodes ==
No.	Title	Directed by	Original release date
1	"Clamitis"	Brian Kirk	5 March 2004
The guys are broke as usual and get involved in trying set up a phoney accident which would get them compensation
2	"Meat is Murder"	Brian Kirk	5 March 2004
Ta's uncle asks the guys to dispose of a cow but the guys spot a chance of making a few pounds selling bits of it off not realising it is possibly infected with Mad Cow disease.
3	"The Quiz"	Brian Kirk	12 March 2004
Ta owes his ex-wife child support. She refuses to let him see their son until he pays up. £1,000 prize money for a quiz at the local pub might help him out.
4	"Dog-Eat-Dog"	Brian Kirk	12 March 2004
The owner of a prize Shih Tzu hires the guys to steal another prize Shih Tzu so the two dogs can mate. As usual, things do not go as planned.
5	"Spousal Arousal"	Brian Kirk	19 March 2004
'Mick Bad News' thinks his wife is having an affair. He hires the guys to trail her to a local hotel where she picks up various men. After telling him the bad news, he suggests they set up a trap for her.
6	"Catch the Pigeon"	Pearse Elliot	19 March 2004
As a favour for the wife of recently deceased Barney the Bird, the guys knock down his pigeon shed and accidentally come across his secret pigeon feed formula. The guys then decide to sell it to the highest bidder starting a bidding war between 'Hong Kong Paddy' and 'Petsey Pigeon'.
7	"The Pirate and the Choir Boys"	Pearse Elliot	26 March 2004
Ta gets a legitimate job and Shay becomes a taxi driver. It looks like the boys are breaking up until Shay upsets Concepta McCluskey, the mother of the three biggest guys in the west.
8	"Two Weddings and a Break In"	Phillipa Langdale	26 March 2004
Wardrobe wants to buy his mum's house for her as a birthday present but the guys are broke. His cousin's offer to the gang to steal his wedding presents whilst he is away on honeymoon could solve Wardrobe's problem until the local hoodlum, Hokey, gets involved.
9	"The Grandfather Clock"	Phillipa Langdale	2 April 2004
Local entrepreneur, JJ Diamond, enlists the help of the guys to bring a grandfather clock across the border. Dissident republicans hijack their van and use it for planting a bomb.
10	"All Day Long"	Phillipa Langdale	2 April 2004
Still working for JJ Diamond, the guys almost have enough money for a stag night for Ta. When they go to JJ's for one last move, the police are already at his house and have arrested Carol. The guys are asked to smuggle JJ out of the country.

== Cast ==
- Simon Delaney as Wardrobe
- Ciarán McMenamin as Ta
- Kevin Elliott as Darragh
- Ciaran Nolan as Shay
- Gerard Jordan as Hoker
- Kathy Kiera Clarke as Una
- Lorraine Pilkington as Siobhan
- Doreen Keogh as Wardbrobe's Ma
- Sean McGinley as Bap the Butcher
- Stephen Boyd as Aran
- Dennis Greig as Crazyhorse
- Tony Flynn as Dole Clerk
- Paula McFetridge as Goretti
- Lalor Roddy as Client Advisor
- George Shane as Policeman
- Louise Ewings as Niamh
- Sean McNamee as Shay's Da
- Ossian McCulloch as Ciaran
- Roisin Finnegan as Aoife
- Bridie McMahon as Ma Maguire
