= Denise Gough =

Irish actress (born 1980)

- Gough in 2022
- Born: 28 February 1980 (age 46); Wexford, Ireland
- Education: ALRA
- Occupation: Actress
- Relatives: Kelly Gough (sister)

Denise Gough (/ˈɡɒfˈ/ GOF; born 28 February 1980) is an Irish actress. Recognised for her performances on stage and screen, she has received numerous accolades, including two Laurence Olivier Awards as well as nominations for a Tony Award and a British Academy Television Award.

On television, she is best known for her roles in the BBC Two crime drama Paula (2017), the ITV miniseries Too Close (2021), and the Disney+ series Andor (2022–2025). Her films include Colette (2018), The Other Lamb (2019), Monday (2020), and Martyrs Lane (2021).

== Life and career ==
=== Early years and education ===
Gough was born on 28 February 1980. Born in Wexford and raised in Ennis, County Clare, Gough is the seventh of eleven siblings; her father was variously an electrician and a fisheries head, while her mother was a marriage counsellor. One of her younger sisters is the actress Kelly Gough. Gough was raised as a Catholic.

She trained as a soprano before leaving Ireland for London at 15, with a boyfriend, after which she became homeless for a while. She started using alcohol and drugs to block out the experience of being groomed from the age of 13 and raped twice at 14 by "a man in his 20s". "At the time [Gough] thought it was love," but she later realised that she had been the victim of child abuse.

She was awarded a grant to study at the Academy of Live and Recorded Arts (ALRA) in Wandsworth aged 18, and graduated from ALRA in 2003.

=== Career ===
In 2012, she was nominated for the Milton Shulman Award for Outstanding Newcomer at the Evening Standard Theatre Awards for her performances in Eugene O'Neill's Desire Under the Elms at the Lyric Hammersmith and Nancy Harris's Our New Girl at the Bush Theatre. In January 2014 she was Julia in The Duchess of Malfi, the inaugural production at the Sam Wanamaker Playhouse, London. At the National Theatre, London, in September 2015 she presented an "electrifying" performance as a recovering substance user in Duncan Macmillan's People, Places and Things, directed by Jeremy Herrin.

She reprised the role when the production transferred to the Wyndham's Theatre in March 2016, and subsequently won the Olivier Award for Best Actress. She returned to the National Theatre in April 2017 playing the role of Harper in Marianne Elliot's revival of Tony Kushner's play Angels in America, for which she won the 2018 Olivier Award for Best Actress in a Supporting Role. Gough then returned to People, Places & Things for its New York transfer. In February 2018, Gough returned to the role of Harper in the Broadway transfer of the National Theatre's production of Angels in America, alongside the majority of the London cast.

Gough was cast in the Star Wars TV series Andor as Dedra Meero, an ambitious and strategic supervisor for the Imperial Security Bureau (ISB).

== Acting credits ==
=== Film ===
Year	Title	Role	Notes	Ref.
2010	The Kid	Patsy		
2010	Robin Hood	Village Mother		
2014	Jimmy's Hall	Tess		
2018	Juliet, Naked	Gina		
2018	Colette	Mathilde de Morny		
2019	The Kid Who Would Be King	Mary		
2019	The Other Lamb	Sarah		
2020	Vores mand i Amerika	Charlotte Kauffmann		
2020	Monday	Chloe		
2021	Martyrs Lane	Sarah		
2025	H Is for Hawk	Christina		
2027	Narnia: The Magician's Nephew †	TBA	Post-production	

=== Television ===
Year	Title	Role	Notes	Ref.
2004	Casualty	Susan Parish	Episode: "Three's a Crowd"	
2007	The Inspector Lynley Mysteries	Christine Faraday	Episode: "Limbo"	
2008	The Shooting of Thomas Hurndall	Michelle	Documentary dramatization	
2009	The Bill	Liz O'Halloran	Episode: "Lost Soul"	
2009	Waking the Dead	Kathleen	Episodes: "Magdalene: Part I" and "Magdalene: Part II"	
2010	Silent Witness	Danielle Boyce	Episodes: "Run: Part I" and "Run: Part II"	
2011	Holby City	Mona Cadogan	Episode: "Culture Shock"	
2012	Titanic: Blood and Steel	Emily Hill	11 episodes	
2013	What Remains	Liz Fletcher	4 episodes	
2013	Complicit	Lucy	Television film	
2014	Stella	Collette Jensen	8 episodes	
2014	The Musketeers	Suzette	1 episode	
2015	The Duchess of Malfi	Julia	Television film	
2016	Apple Tree Yard	DS Johns	1 episode	
2016	The Fall	Dr Alison Walden	2 episodes	
2017	Guerrilla	Fallon	6 episodes	
2017	Paula	Paula	3 episodes	
2021	Too Close	Connie Mortensen	Miniseries, 3 episodes	
2022	Under the Banner of Heaven	Dianna Lafferty	Miniseries; Main role	
2022–2025	Andor	Dedra Meero	Main role, 20 episodes	
2023	Who Is Erin Carter?	Lena	Main role, 6 episodes	
2025	The Stolen Girl	Elisa Blix	Miniseries, 5 episodes	

=== Theatre ===
Year	Title	Character	Theatre	Ref.
2004	By the Bog of Cats	Caroline Cassidy	Wyndham's Theatre; London, England	
2004	The Kindness of Strangers	Cheryl	Liverpool Everyman; Liverpool, England	
2006	Everything is Illuminated	Brod	Hampstead Theatre; London, England	
2006	O Go My Man	Elsa	Royal Court Theatre; London, England	
2007	Someone Else's Shoes	Mary	Soho Theatre; London, England	
2009	The Grouch	Celia	West Yorkshire Playhouse; Leeds, England	
2009	Six Characters in Search of an Author	Stepdaughter	Chichester Festival Theatre; Chichester, England	
2009	Six Characters in Search of an Author	Stepdaughter	Gielgud Theatre; London, England	
2009	The Birds	Julia	Gate Theatre; Dublin, Ireland	
2010	The Plough and the Stars	Nora Clitheroe	Abbey Theatre; Dublin, Ireland	
2010	Jesus Hopped the 'A' Train	Mary Jane Hanrahan	Trafalgar Studios; London, England	
2011	The Painter	Jenny Cole	Arcola Theatre; London, England	
2012	Our New Girl	Annie	Bush Theatre; London, England	
2012	Desire Under the Elms	Anna Putnam	Lyric Hammersmith; London, England	
2014	Adler and Gibb	Louise	Royal Court Theatre; London, England	
2014	The Duchess of Malfi	Julia	Sam Wanamaker Playhouse; London, England	
2015	People, Places and Things	Emma	Dorfman Theatre; National Theatre; London, England	
2016	People, Places and Things	Emma	Wyndham's Theatre; London, England	
2024	People, Places and Things	Emma	Trafalgar Theatre; London, England	
2017	Angels in America	Harper Pitt et al.	Lyttleton Theatre; National Theatre; London, England	
2017	People, Places and Things	Emma	St. Ann's Warehouse; New York City, NY, U.S.	
2018	Angels in America	Harper Pitt et al.	Neil Simon Theatre; New York City, NY, U.S.	
2022	Portia Coughlan	Portia Coughlan	Abbey Theatre; Dublin, Ireland	
2024	White Rabbit Red Rabbit		@sohoplace London, England	
2025	High Noon	Amy Fowler	Harold Pinter Theatre; London, England	

=== Video games ===
Year	Title	Role	Studio	Notes	Ref.
2013	Divinity: Dragon Commander	Catherine	Larian Studios	Voice	
2015	The Witcher 3: Wild Hunt	Yennefer of Vengerberg	CD Projekt Red	Voice	
2015	Dragon Quest Heroes: The World Tree's Woe and the Blight Below	Alena	Omega Force	Voice	
2016	Dragon Quest Heroes II	Alena	Omega Force	Voice	

== Awards and nominations ==
Year	Award	Category	Work	Result	Ref(s)
2015	Evening Standard Theatre Award	Best Actress	People, Places and Things	Nominated	
2015	Critics' Circle Theatre Award	Best Actress	People, Places and Things	Won	
2016	Laurence Olivier Award	Best Actress	People, Places and Things	Won	
2016	WhatsOnStage Award	Best Actress in a Play	People, Places and Things	Nominated	
2018	Drama Desk Award	Outstanding Actress in a Play	People, Places and Things	Nominated	
2018	Obie Award	Performance	People, Places and Things	Won	
2018	Tony Award	Best Featured Actress in a Play	Angels in America	Nominated	
2018	Laurence Olivier Award	Best Actress in a Supporting Role	Angels in America	Won	
2018	Outer Critics Circle Award	Outstanding Featured Actress in a Play	Angels in America	Nominated	
2018	Theatre World Award		Angels in America	Honouree	
2022	British Academy Television Awards	Best Actress	Too Close	Nominated	
2022	Peabody Award	Entertainment	Andor	Won	

== See also ==
- List of Irish actors
