= Pauline Goldsmith =

British actress

Pauline Goldsmith is an actress, theatre maker and comedic writer from Belfast in Northern Ireland. She has lived in Glasgow and Belfast. Her plays include "Bright Colours Only" which has been created several times for the Edinburgh Fringe Festival and has toured in two languages.

== Career ==
Goldsmith is known in theatre for her Irish wake play Bright Colours Only. It was first performed in November 2001 at Tramway Theatre as part of the Dark Lights Festival. Since then the show has been performed over 20 years It was part of the programme at the Edinburgh Fringe Festival for two consecutive years, and in 2002 productions in England and in 2003 in Brazil. In 2017 it again returned to the Fringe when it was "highly recommended". It has toured in Irish as Dathanna Geala Amháin, transcreated by Séamas Mac Annaidh.

Goldsmith won the 2004 Best Actress Award at the Edinburgh Festival Fringe for her performance in Samuel Beckett's 1972 play Not I. She also performed her second play, Should've Had the Fish, at the Assembly Rooms at the Fringe Festival during August 2006.

In 2012 she wrote and performed in a six part sketch show with Vivienne Grahame and Jo Sutherland for Radio Scotland. The premise for the show was people meeting at the school gates as they collected their children. The show was called "The Gates".

In 2016 she appeared as the capitalist antagonist in "The Destroyed Room" which was apocalyptic play about modern conversations. It was performed in Glasgow, Edinburgh and London by the group, "Vanishing Point" In 2022 she was in the small cast of Debbie Tucker Green's "hang" at the Tron Theatre in Glasgow with Saskia Ashdown and Renee Williams.

== Film credits ==
Goldsmith has appeared in the following films:

- How High the Castle Walls (1997; short film)
- The Magdalene Sisters (2002)
- 16 Years of Alcohol (2003)
- Hikkimori (2007)
- Peacefire (2008)

=== Awards ===
- Best Actress, Edinburgh Festival Fringe (2004)
- Creative Scotland (2006)

== See also ==
- List of British playwrights
- List of people from Belfast
