= Scúp =

- Title screen
- Created by: Colin Bateman
- Developed by: Stirling Film and Television Production
- Written by: Colin Bateman; Peadar Cox
- Directed by: Declan Recks
- Starring: Don Wycherley; Kelly Gough; Denis Conway; Caitríona Ní Mhurchú; Donncha Crowley; Tim Creed; Patrick McBride; Conor MacNeill; Shane Fallon
- Country of origin: Northern Ireland
- Original languages: Irish (Ulster Irish); English
- No. of seasons: 2
- No. of episodes: 14

Production
- Producers: Michael Parke; Marie-Thérèse Mackle
- Camera setup: Single Camera
- Running time: 25 mins
- Production company: Stirling Productions

Original release
- Network: TG4; BBC Northern Ireland
- Release: 27 February 2013 – 6 May 2014

Scúp (Irish: [sˠkuːpˠ]; "Scoop") is a Northern Irish drama television series which was broadcast on TG4 and BBC Northern Ireland in 2013–14. The series was nominated to the Special Irish Language Award at the 11th Irish Film & Television Awards in 2014.

== Plot ==
Rob Cullan is sacked from his job at The Guardian following a phone hacking scandal. He returns home to Belfast where Diarmuid Black puts him in charge of failing Irish language newspaper An Nuacht. The editor has just dropped dead, the boss – Diarmuid – is writing bouncing cheques to cover his debts, the paper is full of propaganda but has no news. It's up to Rob to turn it around with the help of reporters and a young photographer – but in his first week he has already crossed a powerful gang boss and discovered that not all the staff are what they seem. Tightly written by newspaper editor and thriller writer Colin Bateman and translated into idiomatic Irish by Peadar Cox, the series launched a host of young Irish acting talent.

== Cast ==
- Don Wycherley as Rob (14 episodes, 2013–2014)
- Kelly Gough as Alix (14 episodes, 2013–2014)
- Denis Conway as Diarmuid (14 episodes, 2013–2014)
- Caitríona Ní Mhurchú as Janine (14 episodes, 2013–2014)
- Donncha Crowley as Cormac (14 episodes, 2013–2014)
- Tim Creed as Michael (8 episodes, 2013)
- Patrick McBride as Seán (8 episodes, 2013)
- Conor MacNeill as Gerry (6 episodes, 2014)
- Shane Fallon as Patrick (6 episodes, 2014)
