= The Fall (TV series) =

German-Irish-British television crime drama series (2013–2016)

- The Fall title card
- Genre: Crime drama; Thriller
- Created by: Allan Cubitt
- Written by: Allan Cubitt
- Directed by: Jakob Verbruggen; Allan Cubitt
- Starring: Gillian Anderson; Jamie Dornan
- Theme music composer: David Holmes
- Composers: David Holmes; Keefus Ciancia
- Countries of origin: United Kingdom; Ireland; Germany
- Original language: English
- No. of series: 3
- No. of episodes: 17 (list of episodes)

Production
- Executive producers: Gillian Anderson; Allan Cubitt; Patrick Irwin; Justin Thomson-Glover; Stephen Wright
- Producers: Gub Neal; Julian Stevens; Carol Moorhead
- Production locations: Belfast, Northern Ireland
- Running time: 60–90 minutes
- Production companies: Fables Limited; Artists Studio; Ingenious Media (season 1); BBC Northern Ireland; RTÉ; ZDF

Original release
- Network: BBC Two (UK); RTÉ One (Ireland); ZDFneo (Germany)
- Release: 13 May 2013 – 28 October 2016

The Fall is a crime drama television series filmed and set in Northern Ireland. The series, starring Gillian Anderson as Detective Superintendent Stella Gibson, and Jamie Dornan as serial killer Paul Spector, was created and written by Allan Cubitt. It is produced by Artists Studio, and shown on ZDFneo in Germany, RTÉ One in the Republic of Ireland, and BBC Two in the UK.

The series premiered in the Republic of Ireland and Northern Ireland on RTÉ One on 12 May 2013, and in the United Kingdom on BBC Two on 13 May 2013 followed by ZDFneo. The second series began in the Republic of Ireland on 9 November and in the UK on 13 November 2014. The third series premiered on RTÉ One on 25 September and on BBC Two on 29 September 2016.

== Plot ==
Metropolitan Police Superintendent Stella Gibson, a senior investigating officer who reviews investigations, is seconded to the Police Service of Northern Ireland (PSNI) to assess the progress of a murder investigation that has remained active for longer than 28 days. When it becomes apparent that a serial killer is on the loose, local detectives must work with Stella to find and capture Paul Spector, who is attacking young professional women in the city of Belfast. As time passes, Stella's team works tirelessly to build a case but they are met with complications inside and outside the PSNI.

== Development ==
Cubitt said that he originally was researching another show he was planning on writing and read a book on the BTK ("Bind, Torture, Kill") serial killer, Dennis Rader. Cubitt found the structure of the book intriguing, which began with a look at the BTK Killer's attack that was possible because of Rader's testimony, his documentary evidence and the extensive forensic evidence that was gathered from the scene of the crime. Cubitt created a structure where the killer is identified immediately, eliminating the whodunit aspect of many stories. The focus could then become the motives for the killings and on the insights that might be gained about the psychology of the killer, even in the face of what might be considered a normal, functioning person with a job, wife, and children. Cubitt said this was the starting point that interested him: how this supposedly normally functioning person would then be connected to the crimes.

=== Series 1 ===
On 3 February 2012, BBC Two picked up The Fall series with a five-episode order. The series was written by Allan Cubitt and produced for BBC Two by Artists Studio and BBC Northern Ireland, with funding from Northern Ireland Screen and the European Regional Development Fund. Gub Neal and Julian Stevens produced, with Cubitt, Justin Thomson-Glover, Patrick Irwin, and Stephen Wright serving as executive producers. Jakob Verbruggen directed the first series. Cubitt cast Gillian Anderson first, then cast Jamie Dornan. The series premiered in the Republic of Ireland on RTÉ One on 12 May 2013, in the UK on BBC Two on 13 May 2013 and ZDFneo on 14 May 2013.

=== Series 2 ===
BBC Two renewed the show for a second series on 27 May 2013. On 21 October 2013, it was announced that Jakob Verbruggen would not be returning to direct The Fall's second series. Instead Cubitt would direct, with production due to begin in February 2014. Series star Gillian Anderson became an executive producer for the programme from its second series. Production of series 2 ended in June 2014. Series 2 began in the Republic of Ireland and Northern Ireland on Sunday, 9 November on RTÉ One and in the United Kingdom on BBC Two Thursday, 13 November 2014.

=== Series 3 ===
In March 2015, it was announced that the BBC had commissioned a third series of The Fall. Cubitt stated that this series was conceived "in the hope of further exploring the characters and themes that are at the heart of [the drama]". Cubitt stated that he had already envisaged how the show's third series would end. Carol Moorhead replaced Julian Stevens as second producer of the third series. Filming took place in Belfast between December 2015 and April 2016. The third series got an exclusive look at the Edinburgh International Television Festival on 25 August 2016. It premiered in the Republic of Ireland on Sunday, 25 September on RTÉ One and in the UK on Thursday, 29 September 2016 on BBC Two.

=== Future ===
It was reported that Cubitt has ideas for several seasons past Spector's arc. In September 2016, Cubitt confirmed that the third series is Dornan's last, but expressed intention for future series. Cubitt added that the fourth series "isn't going to be straight away." Anderson stated: "I'm excited by the idea of potentially revisiting it in a few years, to see what transpires in Stella's life afterwards."

== Casting ==
=== Series 1 ===
Casting announcements began in February 2012, with Gillian Anderson first to be cast in the series as Detective Superintendent Stella Gibson. Next to join the series was Northern Irish actor Jamie Dornan as serial killer Paul Spector. Séainín Brennan, Archie Panjabi, Emmett Scanlan and Karen Hassan were next to be cast, with Brennan playing Liz Tyler, Panjabi playing Reed Smith, Scanlan playing DC Glen Martin and Hassan playing Annie Brawley. It was later announced that Niamh McGrady, Bronagh Waugh, and John Lynch had joined the series.

=== Series 2 ===
In 2014, it was announced that Colin Morgan and Bronagh Taggart had joined the cast in starring roles as Tom Anderson and Gail McNally, respectively. Jonjo O'Neill later joined the main cast, while Claire Rafferty was cast in a recurring capacity. Ian McElhinney departed the series in episode 1, whilst lead actress Archie Panjabi departed following the series’ penultimate episode.

=== Series 3 ===
Anderson, Dornan, Lynch, Waugh, Franciosi, Kane, O'Neill, and Morgan all returned as regulars for the third series, alongside new cast members Aisling Bea, Richard Coyle, Barry Ward, Richard Clements, Ruth Bradley, Genevieve O'Reilly, Aidan McArdle, Denise Gough, Martin McCann, Conor MacNeill and Krister Henriksson. Former main cast members Niamh McGrady, Stuart Graham and Bronagh Taggart returned in guest arcs.

== Main cast and characters ==
=== Police ===
- Gillian Anderson as DSU Stella Gibson
- John Lynch as ACC Jim Burns
- Stuart Graham as DCI Matthew Eastwood
- Niamh McGrady as PC Danielle Ferrington
- Archie Panjabi as Professor Reed Smith
- Colin Morgan as DS Tom Anderson
- Michael McElhatton as DI Rob Breedlove
- Ben Peel as DS James Olson
- Bronágh Taggart as DC Gail McNally
- Emmett J. Scanlan as DC Glenn Martin
- Richard Clements as DC Rick Turner
- Kelly Gough as PC Hagstrom
- Siobhán McSweeney as Mary McCurdy

=== Spector family and friends ===
- Jamie Dornan as Peter Paul Spector
- Bronagh Waugh as Sally Ann Spector (née Goodall)
- Sarah Beattie as Olivia Spector
- David Beattie as Liam Spector
- Aisling Franciosi as Katrina 'Katie' Benedetto

=== Victims and families ===
- Valene Kane as Rose Veronica Stagg (née McGill)
- Jonjo O'Neill as Tom Stagg
- Laura Donnelly as Sarah Kay
- Ian McElhinney as Morgan Monroe
- Eugene O'Hare as Aaron Monroe
- Karen Hassan as Ann 'Annie' Brawley
- William Willoughby as Jack Brawley

=== Others ===
- Séainín Brennan as Liz Tyler
- Brian Milligan as James 'Jimmy' Tyler
- Nick Lee as Ned Callan
- Tara Lee as Daisy Drake
- Aisling Bea as Nurse Kiera Sheridan
- Krister Henriksson as Dr August Larson
- Aidan McArdle as Sean Healy
- Ruth Bradley as Louise Wallace
- Darran Watt as Tom Johnston

Cubitt was inspired by guitar manufacturing companies when naming some of his characters; Stella, Gibson and Spector are brands of guitar, as are Benedetto, Brawley, Breedlove, Burns, Eastwood, Hagstrom, James Olson, James Tyler, Kay, Martin, Music Man, Paul Reed Smith, Rick Turner, Stagg, Terry McInturff, and Tom Anderson.

== Episodes ==
Series	Episodes	Originally released	
Series	Episodes	First released	Last released
1	5	12 May 2013	9 June 2013
2	6	9 November 2014	13 December 2014
3	6	25 September 2016	28 October 2016

== International broadcast ==
- The first series aired on Bravo in Canada. Reruns have aired on M3 since June 2014.
- The series also aired across Latin America during September 2013 for subscribers to the TV satellite provider DirecTV. The Fall was aired on the exclusive channel OnDIRECTV in high definition. The entire series was aired on OnDirectv, an exclusive TV channel for DirecTV subscribers and as of 2017 it is also available on Netflix in the region.
- HBO Europe has picked up the series to air on their Cinemax channels in the Czech Republic, Slovakia, Hungary, Poland, Romania, Moldova, Bulgaria, Croatia, Slovenia, Serbia, Montenegro, Kosovo, Macedonia, Bosnia-Herzegovina and Albania.
- Estonian National Broadcasting started to run the series in Estonia on channel ETV (Eesti Televisioon) on 7 December 2014.
- In Germany, the show was given the title Tod in Belfast ("Death in Belfast"); the first two series aired together in Germany on ZDF from 15 November to 16 December 2015. The two series were shown in a recut containing 6 episodes with each being 90 minutes long and a total of 540 minutes altogether. This equates to approximately 120 minutes of the whole material of series 1 and 2 being cut. The uncut version was later shown in re-run by channels ZDFneo and Sky Krimi. In the US, Tubi carried the series at its launch date in 2014 as an original exclusive series on the service. The continues to be available on the platform today and is also available to stream now as of 2018 on Netflix and AMC-owned streamer dedicated to streaming internationally produced co-productions and acquired shows, Acorn TV. In September 2020, after launching their Mystery Alley block in August that year, Ovation (American TV channel) acquired the rights to the series in a deal with BBC Studios that meant acquiring the studio's content that originally was produced for the BBC and BBC America first, such as The Fall (TV series) and it premiered in October 2020 and ran until February 2021 on the network.

== Reception ==
The Fall received positive reviews from critics. On Rotten Tomatoes, 95% of 20 critic reviews were positive for the series one. Its consensus is, "Less sensationalistic and more provocative than most police procedurals, The Fall is unapologetically sexy with pressure-building tension driven by plausible characters and motifs." The Guardian ranked it the tenth best television show of 2013. The second and the third series earned 93% and 64% approval rating, respectively. The third series consensus reads, "The Fall stumbles somewhat in its third season, but still delivers enough to satisfy fans of the show—and slow-burning psychological thrillers in general." The first series has a score of 81 out of 100 on Metacritic, indicating "universal acclaim". The last series has a score of 60 out of 100, indicating "mixed or average reviews".

Sophie Gilbert of The Atlantic wrote regarding season three: "[f]or all its psychological, almost literary complexity, it loses much of its narrative steam. It's that great 21st-century phenomenon: a show that's more fun to think about than to watch." Ken Tucker also felt that the show lost its quality, criticized the character development, but found Anderson and Dornan to be "good" and "handsome and skilled" respectively. Reviewing the second season, TV critic Lucy Mangan of The Guardian criticised the writing and the dialogue. However, she praised the performances of Anderson and Dornan. Conversely in a more positive review, Ben Travers of the IndieWire opined that Dornan's portrayal was "both ideal and disappointing." About the first season, David Thomson of The New Republic said: "The BBC's Latest Import is Modern, Chilling, and Groundbreaking." Similarly, Neil Genzlinger writing for The New York Times stated: "It’s a fine show, relying on slow-building tension rather than the gory shock value [...]", but found Anderson's character to be the least developed one in the show.

The show received some criticism for its portrayal of violence against women. Rachel Cooke of The Guardian described it as "misogyny in a veil of classiness". Speaking out against "crime porn", actress Doon Mackichan cited The Fall as an example of dramas that use "brutalised women" as "entertainment fodder".

In the book Crime TV, Streaming Criminology in Popular Culture, Jonathan A Grubb and Chad Posick, assistant professors in the department of criminal justice and criminology at Georgia Southern University, wrote that the show conveyed "a fairly solid understanding of the thinking of a psychopathic killer." They stated that Dornan's performance was "quite convincing."

=== Awards and nominations ===
Year	Award	Category	Nominee(s)	Result
2013	Crime Thriller Awards	The Best Actress Dagger	Gillian Anderson	Nominated
2013	Crime Thriller Awards	The Best TV Drama Dagger	The Fall	Nominated
2013	Royal Television Society Craft & Design Awards	Make Up - Drama	Pamela Smyth	Nominated
2013	Royal Television Society Craft & Design Awards	Music - Original Score	David Holmes, Keefus Green	Nominated
2014	Edgar Allan Poe Awards	Best Television Episode Teleplay	Allan Cubitt	Won
2014	Broadcasting Press Guild Awards	Breakthrough Award	Jamie Dornan	Won
2014	Broadcasting Press Guild Awards	Best Actress	Gillian Anderson	Nominated
2014	Broadcasting Press Guild Awards	Writer's Award	Allan Cubitt	Nominated
2014	British Academy Television Awards	Best Leading Actor	Jamie Dornan	Nominated
2014	British Academy Television Awards	Best Mini Series	The Fall	Nominated
2014	British Academy Television Craft Awards	Best Editing: Fiction	Steve Singleton	Won
2014	Banff Television Festival Rockie Awards	Best Procedural Drama	The Fall	Nominated
2014	Irish Film and Television Awards	Best Television Drama	The Fall	Won
2014	Irish Film and Television Awards	Best Lead Actor – Television	Jamie Dornan	Won
2014	Irish Film and Television Awards	Best Original Score (Film/TV Drama)	David Holmes	Won
2014	Irish Film and Television Awards	Director of Photography - Drama	Ruairi O'Brien	Nominated
2014	Irish Film and Television Awards	Make-Up & Hair - Drama	The Fall	Nominated
2014	Irish Film and Television Awards	Production Design - Drama	Tom McCullough	Nominated
2015	Satellite Awards	Best Actress – Television Series Drama	Gillian Anderson	Nominated
2015	Satellite Awards	Best Television Series – Drama	The Fall	Nominated
2015	Monte-Carlo Television Festival Awards	Golden Nymph Award for Best Actress - Television Drama Series	Gillian Anderson	Nominated
2015	Monte-Carlo Television Festival Awards	Golden Nymph Award for Best Drama Series	The Fall	Nominated
2015	Irish Film and Television Awards	Best Supporting Actress - Drama	Aisling Franciosi	Won
2015	Irish Film and Television Awards	Best Actor - Drama	Jamie Dornan	Nominated
2015	Irish Film and Television Awards	Best Television Drama	The Fall	Nominated
2015	British Screenwriters Awards	Best British Crime Writing	Allan Cubitt	Won
2015	British Academy Television Craft Awards	Best Editing: Fiction	Steve Singleton	Nominated
2015	Royal Television Society Northern Ireland Awards	Best Drama	The Fall	Nominated
2015	Sichuan Television Festival	Best Actress	Gillian Anderson	Nominated
2015	C21 International Drama Awards	Best Female Performance	Gillian Anderson	Nominated
2015	C21 International Drama Awards	Best Male Performance	Jamie Dornan	Nominated
2015	C21 International Drama Awards	Best Returning Series	The Fall	Nominated
2015	C21 International Drama Awards	Best English Language Drama	The Fall	Nominated
2016	Jupiter Award	Best International TV Series	The Fall	Nominated
2017	Satellite Awards	Best Television Series – Drama	The Fall	Nominated
2017	Irish Film and Television Awards	Best Drama	The Fall	Nominated
2017	Webby Awards	Best Actress	Gillian Anderson	Won

== Home media ==
The first series was made available in full in the United States via Netflix's "Watch Instantly" service starting 28 May 2013, and aired on Bravo and Netflix in Canada.

The second series was broadcast on Netflix's "Watch Instantly" service, starting in January 2015, in the United States. It was also broadcast on Netflix in Canada. In Latin America, Netflix began broadcasting the season on 16 January 2015, at 12:01 am.

The third series was made available to non-UK Netflix subscribers on 29 October 2016.

The complete series was released in the US on DVD and Blu-Ray by Acorn on 21 November 2017.

Series	Originally aired		DVD release dates			Blu-ray disc release date	
Series	First aired	Last aired	Region 1	Region 2	Region 4	Region A	Region B
1	13 May 2013	10 June 2013	15 October 2013	17 June 2013	20 November 2013	1 March 2016	17 June 2013
2	13 November 2014	17 December 2014	TBA	26 December 2014	TBA	1 March 2016	26 December 2014

== French remake ==
In August 2016, it was announced that the French private national TV channel TF1 was producing a remake of the series, titled Insoupçonnable ("unsuspected"). The French adaptation starred Emmanuelle Seigner and Melvil Poupaud as the leads, and supporting cast included: Jean-Hugues Anglade, Claire Keim, Patrick Chesnais, Bérengère Krief and Sofia Essaïdi. Filming began in Lyon on 12 September 2016.

== See also ==
- Fetch the Bolt Cutters, a 2020 Fiona Apple album named after a line from the show
- Dennis Rader, the American serial killer from whom Allan Cubitt drew much inspiration for the series
