= Nick Lee (actor) =

Irish actor

- Occupation: Actor

Nick Lee is an Irish actor. His work on screen includes Reign (The CW); The Fall (BBC); Jack Taylor (TV3/RTL); Raw (RTÉ); Single-Handed: The Stolen Child (RTÉ); as Michael Collins in Frongoch - University of Revolution (TG4/S4C); The Clinic (RTÉ); Battlefield Britain (BBC); and the final series of Bachelors Walk (RTÉ). His stage work includes: The Changeling (Young Vic, London); Dubliners (Dublin Theatre Festival); Juno and the Paycock directed by Howard Davies (Abbey Theatre/National Theatre, London); Pineapple by Philip McMahon (Calipo); Malachy in The Dead School by Pat McCabe (Tricycle Theatre, London); The Passing written and directed by Paul Mercier and Three Sisters directed by David Leveaux (Abbey Theatre Dublin); Dmitry Karamazov in Delirium by Enda Walsh; Shawn Keogh in The Playboy of the Western World directed by Tony award winning director Garry Hynes (Druid/Tokyo International Arts Festival/Perth International Arts Festival, Australia); DruidSynge- The Complete Plays of JM Synge directed by Garry Hynes (Galway, Dublin, Edinburgh, Inis Meain, Guthrie Theater Minneapolis & at the Lincoln Center Festival in New York City); The Year of the Hiker directed by Garry Hynes (Druid/Irish Tour); as Michael Hegarty in The Freedom of the City by Brian Friel (Finborough Theatre, London); as Patrick Kavanagh in The Green Fool (Upstate Theatre Project)
