= Ronan Bennett =

Irish novelist and screenwriter (born 1956)

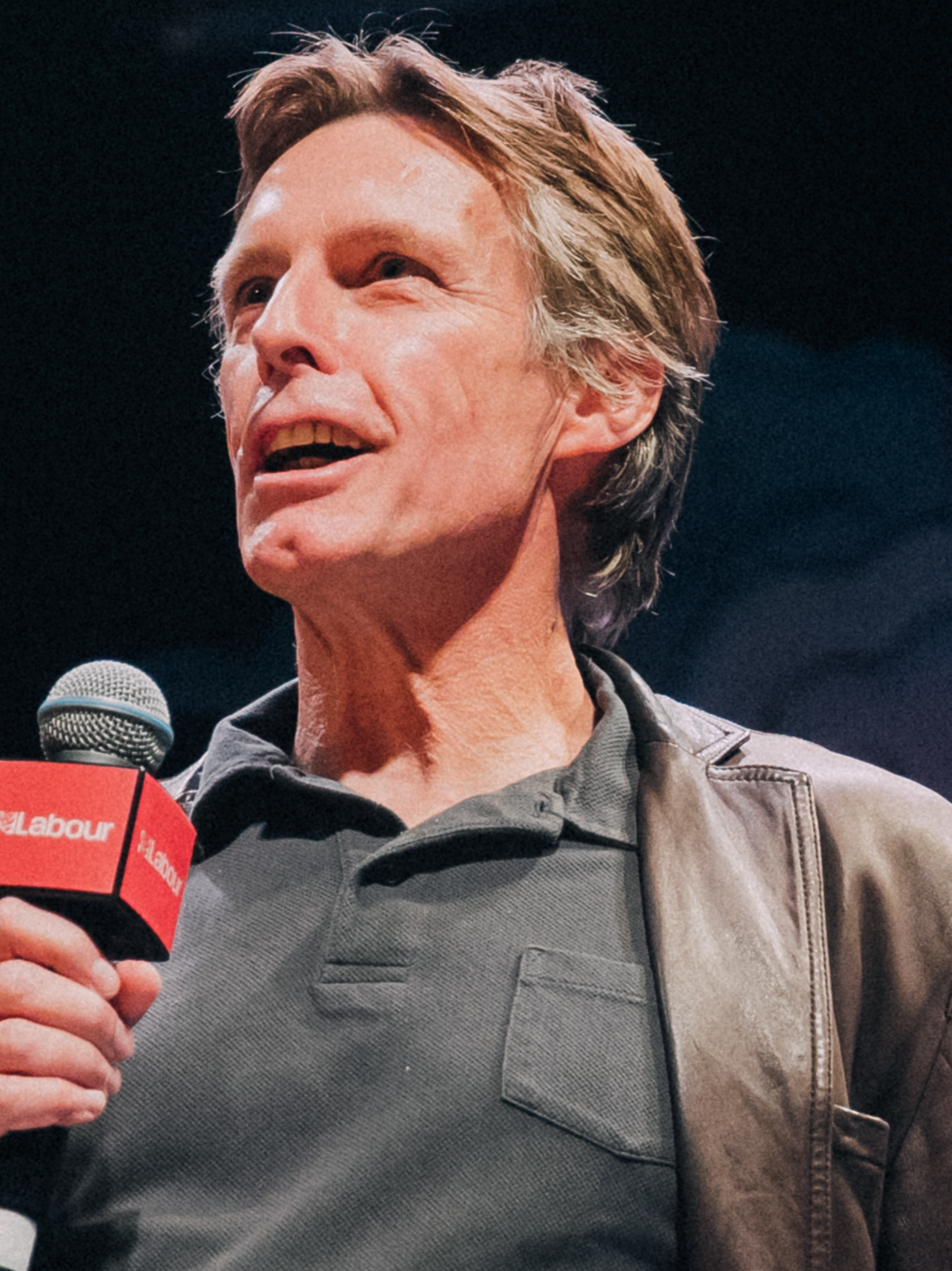
- Bennett in 2019
- Born: 14 January 1956 (age 70); Belfast, Northern Ireland
- Education: St Mary's Christian Brothers' Grammar School, Belfast; King's College London
- Occupations: Novelist and screenwriter
- Spouse: Georgina Henry (m. 2003; died 2014)
- Children: 2, including Finn

Ronan Bennett (born 14 January 1956) is an Irish novelist and screenwriter. He is best known for his work as showrunner, writer and executive producer of the drug and gang-related crime drama television series Top Boy. His other writing credits include the 1997 crime film Face, the 2009 Michael Mann crime biopic Public Enemies and the 2017 BBC historical drama miniseries Gunpowder. He has since gone on to create, write and executive-produce the Golden Globe-nominated thriller series The Day of the Jackal, which has been renewed for a second series.

Born in Belfast, Northern Ireland, Bennett moved to Hackney, East London, where he lived with his wife and two children. Inspired by witnessing a twelve-year-old boy dealing drugs at his local Tesco supermarket in Hackney, Bennett created and wrote Top Boy, a British crime drama television series focusing on gang culture and drug dealing in a predominantly black council estate in East London. Originally airing for two series on Channel 4, the show was cancelled in 2014 but was revived as an original Netflix series, produced by rap artist Drake.

== Background ==
Bennett, the son of William H. and Geraldine Bennett, was born in Belfast but was raised in Newtownabbey, Northern Ireland, in a devout Roman Catholic family. He attended St Mary's Christian Brothers' Grammar School, Belfast, on the Lower Falls Road, where he became politically active. He was accepted for a place at Queen's University, before being arrested for suspected involvement in an IRA robbery.

=== Long Kesh remand ===
In 1974, when he was 19, Bennett was convicted by a no-jury Diplock court of murdering Inspector William Elliott, a 49-year-old police officer in the Royal Ulster Constabulary, during an Official IRA robbery at the Ulster Bank in The Diamond shopping area in Rathcoole, close to his home in Merville Garden Village, on 6 September 1974. His conviction was declared unsafe in 1975 and he was released from Long Kesh prison.

=== "Persons Unknown" trial and Wapping Autonomy Centre ===
Bennett had been writing in prison to Iris Mills in Huddersfield, to which he moved after his release from Long Kesh, becoming involved with anarchist paper Black Flag. Bennett was arrested there with Mills, a New Zealand national, and after an illegal attempt to deport them was made, they moved to Paris, then London. In 1978, he was arrested, again with Iris Mills, for conspiracy to cause explosions with "persons unknown" and spent another 16 months in prison on remand. Bennett conducted his own defence, and he and his co-defendants were acquitted in 1979. In 1992, Bennett wrote a fictionalised account of what was known as the "Persons Unknown" Official Secrets Act trial, The Second Trial. Anarcho-punk band the Poison Girls recorded a song "Persons Unknown" and released it as a joint single with Crass to raise money for Bennett's anarchistic Wapping Autonomy Centre. Mills and Bennett found funding, then rebuilt and decorated the centre, which did not last long, succumbing to vandalism by the punk fans it attracted.

=== Later education and life ===
Bennett studied history at King's College London, receiving a first-class honours degree. He later completed, in 1987, a doctorate on crime and law enforcement in 17th-century England, material he used in Havoc, in its Third Year. (Note: "I'm far more proud of the novel than I am of the PhD." Ronan Bennett) That same year, he was hired as a researcher by Jeremy Corbyn MP, later Leader of the Labour Party, in a move that provoked controversy and security concerns.

Bennett lives in London with his family. His partner since his time at King's College and wife since 2003 was Georgina Henry, former deputy editor of The Guardian and editor of guardian.co.uk, the newspaper's website; Henry died in February 2014 from sinus cancer. Bennett discussed the loss of his wife in a BBC Radio 3 programme, Private Passions. (Note: from 30:58)

From 2006 to 2012, Bennett co-hosted a regular Monday chess column with Daniel King in The Guardian, which seeks to be instructive, rather than topical. Through test positions taken from actual games, their amateur and expert assessments of the possible continuations are discussed and compared. It has been supposed that Nigel Short's column was axed to make way for the new feature and the justification for this change has been the subject of some debate in chess circles.

== Work ==
Bennett has published five novels and two non-fiction works. It was his third novel, The Catastrophist (1997), that brought him into the public eye. This novel is set in Congo, just before independence (1960), followed by the rise and fall of Patrice Lumumba. James Gilliespie, an Irish novelist and journalist finds himself in Leopoldville in pursuit of Inės, an Italian journalist who has fiercely chosen to report on the tribulations Lumumba faced to keep the Congo together and shield it from foreign interference. The novel loosely follows the historical events of 1960-61. Critics hailed the novel, which drew comparisons to Graham Greene, Joseph Conrad and John le Carré's African novel, The Constant Gardener. It was nominated for the Whitbread Award in 1998. Bennett's fourth novel, Havoc, in its Third Year, was published in 2004. It is a dark tale of Puritan fanaticism, set in a town in northern England in the 1630s, in the decade before the English Civil War.

In 1990, Bennett was co-author of Stolen Years: Before and After Guildford, the memoir of Paul Hill, one of the Guildford Four who were wrongfully convicted in 1975 for the Guildford and Woolwich pub bombings and imprisoned for 14 years. Bennett has also written several acclaimed screenplays for film and television, among them The Hamburg Cell and the controversial Rebel Heart. He contributes regularly to the British and Irish press.

In 2006, Bennett's novel Zugzwang, was published week-by-week in the British Sunday newspaper The Observer. The novel was written in weekly instalments with new chapters being submitted to the newspaper close to publication date. Each chapter was accompanied by illustrations by British artist Marc Quinn.

== Politics ==
Bennett is a Labour Party member. In November 2019, he endorsed the Labour Party leader Jeremy Corbyn in the 2019 UK general election. In December 2019, Bennett wrote in The Guardian: "The Corbyn I know is a rare thing – warm, decent and interested in justice", and "The Jeremy Corbyn I met 35 years ago was all about solidarity. He was the ordinary one who has grown as a leader despite everything that has been thrown at him. He is asking us to join in building a society full of decency and love. Those two words alone do it for me." In the same month, along with 42 other leading cultural figures, Bennett signed a letter endorsing the Labour Party under Corbyn's leadership in the 2019 general election. The letter stated that "Labour's election manifesto under Jeremy Corbyn's leadership offers a transformative plan that prioritises the needs of people and the planet over private profit and the vested interests of a few."

== Bibliography ==
Fiction

- The Second Prison (1991) – shortlisted for the 1991 Irish Times/Aer Lingus Prize.
- Overthrown by Strangers (1992)
- The Catastrophist (1998) – shortlisted for the Whitbread Novel Award.
- Havoc, in Its Third Year (2004) – winner of the Hughes & Hughes/Sunday Independent Irish Novel of the Year award.
- Zugzwang (2006)

Non-fiction

- Stolen Years: Before and After Guildford (with Paul Hill, 1990)
- Fire and Rain (broadcast on Radio 4, 1994)
- "Life and Death in Long Kesh" – Ronan Bennett's memoir and film review of Hunger, The Guardian (22 October 2008)

== Filmography ==
Feature films

- A Further Gesture, a.k.a. The Break (1997)
- Lucky Break (2001)
- Face (1997)
- Public Enemies (2009)

Television

- Love Lies Bleeding (1993)
- A Man You Don't Meet Every Day (1994)
- Rebel Heart (2001)
- Fields of Gold (2002)
- The Hamburg Cell (2004)
- Hidden (2011)
- Top Boy (2011–13, 2019–23)
- Gunpowder (2017)
- The Day of the Jackal (2024–present)
- MobLand (2025–present)
- Army of Shadows (TBA)

Short films

- Do Armed Robbers Have Love Affairs? (2002)

== Awards and nominations ==
Award	Year	Category	Work	Result	Ref(s)
BAFTA TV Awards	2012	Best Mini-Series	Top Boy	Nominated	
BAFTA TV Awards	2024	Best Drama Series	Top Boy	Won	
Broadcasting Press Guild Awards	2012	Best Drama Series	Top Boy	Nominated	
Critics Choice Awards	2025	Best Drama Series	The Day of the Jackal	Nominated	
Golden Globe Awards	2025	Best Television Series – Drama	The Day of the Jackal	Nominated	
IFTA Awards	2012	Best Writer – Television Drama	Hidden	Nominated	
IFTA Awards	2018	Best Script – Drama	Gunpowder	Nominated	
IFTA Awards	2020	Best Script – Drama	Top Boy	Nominated	
IFTA Awards	2023	Best Script – Drama	Top Boy	Nominated	
RTS Awards	2012	Drama Series	Top Boy	Won	
RTS Awards	2023	Drama Series	Top Boy	Nominated	
RTS Awards	2024	Drama Series	Top Boy	Nominated	

== See also ==
- List of Northern Irish writers
