= Kelly Gough =

Irish actress

- Born: Ennis, Ireland
- Years active: 2007–present
- Television: Raw; Casualty
- Relatives: Denise Gough (sister)

Kelly Gough is an Irish actress, best known for her role as Kate Kelly in the RTÉ series Raw. From 2019 to 2020, she appeared in the BBC medical drama Casualty as Violette Spark.

== Career ==
Gough's first professional acting role was with the Yew Tree Theatre production of Falling out of Love, written by John Breen and directed by Mikel Murfi. She has subsequently appeared in productions including Big Love for the Abbey Theatre, The Playboy of the Western World for the Druid Theatre Company, All in the Timing for Inis Theatre and Extremities for Spark to a Flame. Later theatre work includes Lady Macbeth in Macbeth directed by David Horan, Elizabeth in Don Carlos directed by Gadi Roll Her 2018 role as Blanche in A Streetcar Named Desire, directed by Chelsea Walker, was described by The Times described as "a name-making performance".

Gough's extensive television credits include season 3 of Marcella for ITV and Netflix, Shadow and Bone, Strike Back, Call the Midwife, Broadchurch, The Fall, Vera, the Irish language series Scúp (for which she was nominated for the Actor of the Year Award at the Oireachtas Irish language media awards) The Clinic, This is Nightlive, and Raw. She has also appeared in the feature-length films Kill Command and Out of Innocence. Short film credits include Cry Rosa and Taking Stock, for which she was nominated Best Actor in a Female Role at the Richard Harris International Film Festival. From 2019 to 2020, she appeared in the BBC medical drama series Casualty as Violette Spark, the sister of established character Ruby Spark (Maddy Hill). Also in 2020, Gough starred as Stacey in the third series of Nordic noir detective series Marcella.

== Personal life ==
Gough and her identical twin sister, Ciara, are the youngest of 11 children. She is the younger sister of actress Denise Gough.
