= Brian Milligan =

Irish actor from Northern Ireland

- Occupation: Actor
- Years active: 1996–present

Brian Milligan (born 1982/1983) is a Northern Irish actor best known for his role in the television crime drama The Fall.

== Early life ==
Milligan grew up in Belfast with his 5 siblings. He attended secondary school at Lagan College. Milligan is an amateur football player for Newtownbreda and supports Arsenal F.C.

While at school he starred in his first television role in Safe and Sound, alongside fellow Northern Ireland actor Michelle Fairley. He also performed on stage at the Royal National Theatre in London. Milligan attended drama school in England.

== Filmography ==
Year	Title	Role
2021	Marcella	Terry Gilmore
2020	My Left Nut	Jimmy Campbell
2019	Bravery Under Fire	Father Willie Doyle
2018	Quantico	Little Bobby
2017	Listen	Father
2017	Bad Day for the Cut	Jerome
2017	My Mother and Other Strangers	Bailiff Billy Prince
2017	The Frankenstein Chronicles	Lloris
2013–2014	The Fall	James Tyler
2012	The Back of Beyond	
2011	Strike Back	Teague
2010	Erwin	Erwin
2010	One Man and His Dog	Alien Jesus
2010	Coming Up	The Young Attendant
2010	Leap Year	Bobbo
2008	Hunger	Davey Gillen
1997	The Boxer	Ned
1996	Safe and Sound	Kevin
