= Rónán Hession =

Mumblin' Deaf Ro
- Born: Rónán Hession; 1975 (age 50–51)
- Origin: Dublin
- Genres: Blues, folk
- Instrument: acoustic guitar
- Years active: 1992–present
- Labels: Villain Records; Popical Island
- Website: ronanhession.com

Rónán Hession (/ˈroʊnɔːn ˈhɛʃən/ ROH-nawn HESH-ən; born 1975), also known as Mumblin' Deaf Ro, is a writer and Irish blues musician. He is also Assistant Secretary General of the Department of Social Protection.

== Musical career (as Mumblin' Def Ro) ==
Hession has performed in several bands in Dublin: Rinty, Boxcar, and The Critters. He also performed under the name of 'Johnny Horsebox'. As Mumblin' Deaf Ro he had his first release in 2003. His 2012 album Dictionary Crimes was named as Irish album of the year by Nialler9 and the Irish Independent, and was nominated for the Choice Music Prize.

== Discography ==
Albums

- Señor, My Friend (2002)
- The Herring and the Brine (2007)
- Dictionary Crimes (2012)

== Writing career ==
Novels

Leonard and Hungry Paul (Bluemoose Books, 2019) ISBN 978-1612198484

Panenka (Bluemoose Books, 2021) ISBN 978-1910422670

Ghost Mountain (Bluemoose Books, 2024) ISBN 978-1915693136

Other writing

Hession reviews fiction for the Irish Times, with a particular focus on fiction in translation, and has also written articles for LitHub.

== Television adaptation ==
In 2025 Leonard and Hungry Paul was adapted into a BBC drama. It starred Alex Lawther, Jamie-Lee O'Donnell and Laurie Kynaston, with Julia Roberts narrating.

== Awards and recognition ==
- 2019 An Post Irish Book Awards Best Newcomer (shortlist): Leonard and Hungry Paul
- 2019 Dalkey Festival debut of The Year (shortlist): Leonard and Hungry Paul
- 2019 Society of Author's debut of The Year (shortlist): Leonard and Hungry Paul
- 2019 #BooksAreMYBag Book of The Year (shortlist): Leonard and Hungry Paul
- 2019 Republic of Consciousness Prize 2019 (longlist): Leonard and Hungry Paul
- 2019 Irish Book Awards Newcomer of The Year (shortlist): Leonard and Hungry Paul
- 2020 An Post Irish Book Awards Short Story of the Year (longlist) 'The Translator's Funeral'
- 2020 British Book Awards Debut Book of the Year (finalist): Leonard and Hungry Paul
- 2021 An Post Irish Book Awards Author of the Year (shortlist) Panenka
- 2021 An Post Irish Books Award for Novel of the Year (shortlist) Panenka
- 2021 Books Are My Bag Awards Novel of the Year (shortlist) Panenka
- 2021 One Dublin One Book: Leonard and Hungry Paul

== Personal life ==
Hession lives in Dublin with his wife and two children and supports Watford Football Club.
