= Saoirse-Monica Jackson =

Actress from Northern Ireland (born 1993)

- Born: November 1993 (age 32–33); Derry, Northern Ireland
- Education: St Cecilia's College
- Alma mater: Arden School of Theatre
- Occupation: Actress
- Years active: 2016–present
- Spouse: Denis Sulta (m. 2025)

Saoirse-Monica Jackson (/ˈsɪərʃə/ SEER-shuh born November 1993) is an Irish actress. She portrayed Erin Quinn on the Channel 4 sitcom Derry Girls from 2018 to 2022 and Cheryl Crawford in the BBC Liverpool gangster series This City Is Ours (2025).

== Early life ==
Jackson was born in Derry in November 1993. She split her time growing up in Derry and Greencastle, County Donegal, where her parents ran a village pub. After obtaining GCSEs and A-levels at St Cecilia's College in Derry, she trained in acting at the Arden School of Theatre in Manchester.

== Career ==
Jackson's television debut came in 2016 when she landed the role of Sasha in Harlan Coben's The Five, appearing in four episodes. In 2016, she also played Curley's wife in the Birmingham Repertory Theatre tour of John Steinbeck's Of Mice and Men. She appeared briefly in the final episode of 2017 BBC One drama series Broken. In 2018, she portrayed Shena Carney in a West End production of The Ferryman at the Gielgud Theatre.

Jackson made her debut as Erin Quinn in the Channel 4 sitcom Derry Girls in the show's first episode, airing on Channel 4 on 4 January 2018. Her performance saw her nominated for the IFTA Gala Television Award for Best Female Performance. She portrayed the role for three seasons until the conclusion of the series in May 2022.

She was the overall winner in the 2019 episode of The Great Christmas/Festive Bake Off.

On 26 June 2020, she and her fellow Derry Girls co stars performed a sketch with Saoirse Ronan for the RTÉ fundraising special RTÉ Does Comic Relief. All proceeds from the night went towards those affected by the COVID-19 pandemic.

In 2025, she played the role of Cheryl Crawford, wife of Davey Crawford (portrayed by Stephen Walters), in the BBC One Liverpool-based gangster television series, This City Is Ours (2025).

In 2026, Jackson played the role of Feeney in Lisa McGee's Netflix series, How to Get to Heaven from Belfast.

== Personal life ==
Jackson became engaged to Scottish DJ Hector Barbour, known professionally as Denis Sulta, in 2023. They married in a Celtic-themed ceremony in County Kerry in August 2025. Muriel Gray is her mother-in-law.

== Filmography ==
=== Film ===
Year	Title	Role	Notes
2020	Liverpool Ferry	Sarah	Short film
2021	Finding You	Emma Callaghan	
2022	Snuff	(unknown)	Short film
2023	Coffee Wars	Roopa	
2023	The Flash	Patty Spivot	
2024	Upgraded	Amy	
TBA	The Body is Water	TBA	Post-production

=== Television ===
Year	Title	Role	Notes
2016	The Five	Sasha	Mini-series; episodes 2–5
2017	Broken	Young Woman	Episode 6: "Father Michael"
2018	The Crystal Maze	Herself - Contestant	Series 8; episode 5: "The Derry Girls"
2018–2022	Derry Girls	Erin Quinn	Main character. Series 1–3; 19 episodes
2020	Urban Myths	Janet	Series 4; episode 4: "F for Fakenham"
2020	Unprecedented: Real Time Theatre from a State of Isolation	Mia	Episode 1: "Viral / Penny / Going Forward"
2020	The Great British Bake Off	Herself - Contestant	Series 10; episode 12: "The Great Festive Bake Off"
2022	Skint	Tara	Episode 1: "I'd Like to Speak to the Manager"
2022	Pointless Celebrities	Herself - Contestant	Series 14; episode 18: "Sitcoms"
2022	The Doll Factory	Bluebell	Main role. Episodes 1, 2 & 6
2023	World's Most Dangerous Roads	Herself	Series 4; episode 6: "Romania" (with Jamie-Lee O'Donnell)
2024	The Decameron	Misia	Episodes 1–8
2025	The Trial	Inquisitor Sarah Willis	Lead role. Television film
2025–present	This City Is Ours	Cheryl Crawford	Main role; 16 episodes
2026	How to Get to Heaven from Belfast	Feeney	Recurring role

=== Theatre ===
Year	Title	Role	Theatre
2016	Of Mice and Men	Curley's wife	Birmingham Repertory Theatre
2017–2018	The Ferryman	Shena Carney	Gielgud Theatre (West End)
2025	Irishtown	Síofra	Irish Repertory Theatre (Off-Broadway)

=== Audiobooks ===
Year	Title	Role	Notes
2025	Harry Potter and the Prisoner of Azkaban (Full-Cast Edition)	Professor Sybill Trelawney	Audible Exclusive
2026	Harry Potter and the Goblet of Fire (Full-Cast Edition)	Professor Sybill Trelawney	Audible Exclusive
2026	Harry Potter and the Order of the Phoenix (Full-Cast Edition)	Professor Sybill Trelawney	Audible Exclusive
2026	Harry Potter and the Half-Blood Prince (Full-Cast Edition)	Professor Sybill Trelawney	Audible Exclusive
2026	Harry Potter and the Deathly Hallows (Full-Cast Edition)	Professor Sybill Trelawney	Audible Exclusive
