= 2018 Laurence Olivier Awards =

2018 award ceremony

- Date: 8 April 2018
- Location: Royal Albert Hall, London
- Hosted by: Catherine Tate

Television/radio coverage
- Network: ITV (television); Magic 105.4 FM (radio)

The 2018 Laurence Olivier Awards ceremony was held on 8 April 2018 at the Royal Albert Hall, London. It was hosted by comedian and actress Catherine Tate.

Hamilton was nominated for a record 13 awards, and won seven.

== Eligibility ==
Any new production that opened between 22 February 2017 and 21 February 2018 in a theatre represented in the membership of the Society of London Theatre was eligible for consideration, provided that its run had included at least thirty performances.

== Event calendar ==
- 2 March: Catherine Tate announced as the host.
- 6 March: Nominations announced by Alexandra Burke and Elaine Paige on Facebook Live
- 8 April: Award ceremony held

== Winners and nominees ==
The nominations were announced on 6 March 2018 in 25 categories.

Best New Play	Best New Musical
The Ferryman by Jez Butterworth – Gielgud Theatre and Royal Court Theatre; Ink by James Graham – Almeida Theatre and Duke of York's Theatre; Network adapted by Lee Hall, based on original text by Paddy Chayefsky – National Theatre Lyttelton; Oslo by J. T. Rogers – Harold Pinter Theatre	Hamilton – Victoria Palace Theatre; An American In Paris – Dominion Theatre; Everybody's Talking About Jamie – Apollo Theatre; Girl From The North Country – The Old Vic and Noël Coward Theatre; Young Frankenstein – Garrick Theatre
Best Revival	Best Musical Revival
Angels in America – National Theatre Lyttleton; Hamlet – Almeida Theatre; Who's Afraid of Virginia Woolf? – Harold Pinter Theatre; Witness for the Prosecution – London County Hall	Follies – National Theatre Olivier; 42nd Street – Theatre Royal, Drury Lane; On the Town – Regent's Park Open Air Theatre
Best New Comedy	Best Entertainment and Family
Labour of Love by James Graham – Noël Coward Theatre; Dry Powder by Sarah Burgess – Hampstead Theatre; Mischief Movie Night by Mischief Theatre – Arts Theatre; The Miser adapted by Sean Foley and Phil Porter, based on original text by Molière – Garrick Theatre	Dick Whittington – London Palladium; David Walliam's Gangsta Granny – Garrick Theatre; Derren Brown: Underground – Playhouse Theatre; Five Guys Named Moe – Marble Arch Theatre
Best Actor	Best Actress
Bryan Cranston as Howard Beale in Network – National Theatre Lyttelton; Paddy Considine as Quinn Carney in The Ferryman – Gielgud Theatre and Royal Court Theatre; Andrew Garfield as Prior Walter in Angels in America – National Theatre - Lyttleton; Andrew Scott as Prince Hamlet in Hamlet – Almeida Theatre	Laura Donnelly as Caitlin Carney in The Ferryman – Gielgud Theatre and Royal Court Theatre; Lesley Manville as Mary Tyrone in Long Day's Journey into Night – Wyndham's Theatre; Audra McDonald as Billie Holiday in Lady Day at Emerson's Bar and Grill – Wyndham's Theatre; Imelda Staunton as Martha in Who's Afraid of Virginia Woolf? – Harold Pinter Theatre
Best Actor in a Musical	Best Actress in a Musical
Giles Terera as Aaron Burr in Hamilton – Victoria Palace Theatre; Ciarán Hinds as Nick Lane in Girl from the North Country – The Old Vic and Noël Coward Theatre; John McCrea as Jamie New in Everybody's Talking About Jamie – Apollo Theatre; Jamael Westman as Alexander Hamilton in Hamilton – Victoria Palace Theatre	Shirley Henderson as Elizabeth Lane in Girl from the North Country – The Old Vic and Noël Coward Theatre; Janie Dee as Phyllis Rogers Stone in Follies – National Theatre Olivier; Imelda Staunton as Sally Durant Plummer in Follies – National Theatre Olivier; Josie Walker as Margaret New in Everybody's Talking About Jamie – Apollo Theatre
Best Actor in a Supporting Role	Best Actress in a Supporting Role
Bertie Carvel as Rupert Murdoch in Ink – Almeida Theatre and Duke of York's Theatre; John Hodgkinson as Tom Kettle in The Ferryman – Gielgud Theatre and Royal Court Theatre; James McArdle as Louis Ironson in Angels in America – National Theatre Lyttleton; Peter Polycarpou as Ahmed Qurei in Oslo – Harold Pinter Theatre	Denise Gough as Harper Pitt in Angels in America – National Theatre Lyttleton; Bríd Brennan as Aunt Maggie Far Away in The Ferryman – Gielgud Theatre and Royal Court Theatre; Dearbhla Molloy as Aunt Pat in The Ferryman – Gielgud Theatre and Royal Court Theatre; Imogen Poots as Honey in Who's Afraid of Virginia Woolf? – Harold Pinter Theatre
Best Actor in a Supporting Role in a Musical	Best Actress in a Supporting Role in a Musical
Michael Jibson as King George III in Hamilton – Victoria Palace Theatre; Ross Noble as Igor in Young Frankenstein – Garrick Theatre; Jason Pennycooke as Marquis de Lafayette and Thomas Jefferson in Hamilton – Victoria Palace Theatre; Cleve September as John Laurens and Philip Hamilton in Hamilton – Victoria Palace Theatre	Sheila Atim as Marianne Lane in Girl from the North Country – The Old Vic and Noël Coward Theatre; Tracie Bennett as Carlotta Campion in Follies – National Theatre Olivier; Rachel John as Angelica Schuyler in Hamilton – Victoria Palace Theatre; Lesley Joseph as Frau Blücher in Young Frankenstein – Garrick Theatre
Best Director	Best Theatre Choreographer
Sam Mendes for The Ferryman – Gielgud Theatre and Royal Court Theatre; Dominic Cooke for Follies – National Theatre Olivier; Marianne Elliot for Angels in America – National Theatre Lyttleton; Rupert Goold for Ink – Almeida Theatre and Duke of York's Theatre; Thomas Kail for Hamilton – Victoria Palace Theatre	Andy Blankenbuehler for Hamilton – Victoria Palace Theatre; Bill Deamer for Follies – National Theatre Olivier; Kate Prince for Everybody's Talking About Jamie – Apollo Theatre; Randy Skinner for 42nd Street – Theatre Royal, Drury Lane; Christopher Wheeldon for An American in Paris – Dominion Theatre
Best Set Design	Best Costume Design
Bob Crowley and 59 Productions for An American in Paris – Dominion Theatre; Bunny Christie for Ink – Almeida Theatre and Duke of York's Theatre; Rob Howell for The Ferryman – Gielgud Theatre and Royal Court Theatre; Vicki Mortimer for Follies – National Theatre Olivier	Vicki Mortimer for Follies – National Theatre Olivier; Hugh Durrant for Dick Whittington – London Palladium; Roger Kirk for 42nd Street – Theatre Royal, Drury Lane; Paul Tazewell for Hamilton – Victoria Palace Theatre
Best Lighting Design	Best Sound Design
Howell Binkley for Hamilton – Victoria Palace Theatre; Paule Constable for Angels in America – National Theatre Lyttleton; Paule Constable for Follies – National Theatre Olivier; Jan Versweyveld for Network – National Theatre Lyttleton	Nevin Steinberg for Hamilton – Victoria Palace Theatre; Tom Gibbons for Hamlet – Almeida Theatre; Gareth Owen for Bat Out of Hell The Musical – London Coliseum; Eric Sleichim for Network – National Theatre Lyttleton
Outstanding Achievement in Music
Lin-Manuel Miranda and Alex Lacamoire for composing and orchestrating Hamilton – Victoria Palace Theatre; Dan Gillespie Sells for composing and orchestrating Everybody's Talking About Jamie – Apollo Theatre; The orchestra of Follies, under the music supervision of Nicholas Skilbeck and music director Nigel Lilley – National Theatre Olivier; Bob Dylan for composing and Simon Hale for orchestrating and arranging Girl from the North Country – The Old Vic and Noël Coward Theatre
Outstanding Achievement in Dance	Best New Dance Production
Francesca Velicu in Pina Bausch's Le Sacre du Printemps by English National Ballet – Sadler's Wells; Rocío Molina for pushing the boundary of flamenco in Fallen from Heaven (Caída Del Cielo) – Barbican Theatre; Zenaida Yanowsky in Liam Scarlett's Symphonic Dances – Royal Opera House	Flight Pattern by Crystal Pite – Royal Opera House; Goat by Ben Duke for Rambert Dance Company – Sadler's Wells; Grand Finale by Hofesh Shechter – Sadler's Wells; Tree Of Codes by Wayne McGregor and the Paris Opera Ballet – Sadler's Wells
Outstanding Achievement in Opera	Best New Opera Production
Joyce DiDonato and Daniela Barcellona in Semiramide – Royal Opera House; Paul Brown for his scenic and costume design for Iolanthe – London Coliseum; Roderick Williams in The Return of Ulysses – The Roundhouse	Semiramide – Royal Opera House; La bohème – Trafalgar Studios 2; The Exterminating Angel – Royal Opera House
Outstanding Achievement in an Affiliate Theatre
Killology – Royal Court Theatre; The B*easts – Bush Theatre; The Red Lion – Trafalgar Studios 2; The Revlon Girl – Park Theatre
Society Special Award
David Lan

== Productions with multiple wins and nominations ==
=== Multiple wins ===
The following productions received multiple awards:

- 7: Hamilton
- 3: The Ferryman
- 2: Angels in America, Follies, Girl from the North Country, Semiramide

Hamilton matched the record set by Matilda the Musical in the 2012 ceremony by winning 7 Olivier Awards, including Best New Musical.

=== Multiple nominations ===
The following productions, including one opera, received multiple nominations:

- 13: Hamilton
- 10: Follies
- 8: The Ferryman
- 6: Angels in America
- 5: Everybody's Talking About Jamie, Girl from the North Country
- 4: Ink, Network
- 3: 42nd Street, An American in Paris, Hamlet, Who's Afraid of Virginia Woolf?, Young Frankenstein
- 2: Dick Whittington, Oslo, Semiramide

Hamilton broke the record for most nominations by a single production with 13 nominations. This title was previously held by Harry Potter and the Cursed Child at the 2017 ceremony and Hairspray at the 2008 ceremony; both received 11 nominations.

== Guest performers ==
- The cast of Hamilton performing 'Alexander Hamilton'
- Lesley Joseph and the cast of Young Frankenstein performing 'Puttin' On the Ritz'
- Tracie Bennett from Follies performing 'I'm Still Here'
- Clare Halse and the cast of 42nd Street performing '42nd Street'
- John McCrea and the cast of Everybody's Talking About Jamie performing 'And You Don't Even Know It'
- Sheila Atim and the cast of Girl From The North Country performing 'Tight Connection To My Heart'
- Chita Rivera, Andy Karl and Adam J. Bernard and choir of the Arts Education School performing 'Somewhere' from West Side Story during the In Memoriam section and celebrating 60 years since the original London production.
- Jason Donovan, Linzi Hateley, Lee Mead, Preeya Kalidas, Joe McElderry and Danielle Hope performing the prologue and 'Any Dream Will Do' from Joseph and the Amazing Technicolor Dreamcoat, celebrating the 50th anniversary of the show.

== See also ==
- 72nd Tony Awards
