= Amy Nuttall =

English actress and singer (born 1982)

- Born: Amy Abigail Nuttall; 7 June 1982 (age 44); Blackburn, Lancashire, England
- Occupations: Actress; singer
- Spouse: Andrew Buchan (m. 2012; sep. 2022)
- Children: 2
- Awards: Honorary Doctorate of Arts, University of Bolton

Amy Abigail Nuttall (born 7 June 1982) is an English actress and singer. She is known for her roles as Chloe Atkinson in the ITV soap opera Emmerdale (2000–2005), housemaid Ethel Parks in the ITV/PBS period drama Downton Abbey (2011–2012), and "Little" Jane Butterfield in Beetlejuice Beetlejuice.

== Early life ==
Nuttall was born in Blackburn, Lancashire. She was educated at Bury Grammar School for Girls and trained at Tring Park School for the Performing Arts. She performed with the National Youth Music Theatre, notably playing the lead role of Princess Ismene in Aurelius at the Tyne Opera House, Newcastle and the Assembly Rooms in Edinburgh in August 1997.

== Career ==
Nuttall is credited as the youngest actress to understudy and play the lead role of Christine in The Phantom of the Opera (at age 17) (National Tour), she has sung at the Royal Albert Hall, Royal Festival Hall and Old Trafford and won an edition of Celebrity Stars in Their Eyes as Sarah Brightman.

Shortly before leaving Emmerdale, Nuttall appeared in Notes from New York at the Trafalgar Studios opposite Jon Lee and Julie Atherton. In 2005, she released her debut album as a classical vocalist, Best Days, on EMI Classics and filmed music videos for her tracks "Best Days", "No Greater Gift" and a version of "Scarborough Fair", which was heavily requested on Classic FM TV. Best Days peaked at number four in the UK classical chart and was nominated for Album of the Year at the 2006 Classic BRIT Awards.

In the same year, Nuttall took part in the reality TV programme Celebrity Shark Bait, which also featured Richard E. Grant and Ruby Wax and appeared in Celebrate Oliver, a musical special for BBC1.

In the autumn of 2005, Nuttall toured the UK extensively as Eliza Doolittle in My Fair Lady to critical acclaim. She shared the role with Lisa O'Hare on the National Tour due to other commitments with her first album. The tour started on 5 October 2005 at the Palace Theatre in Manchester and ended on 12 August 2006 at the Wales Millennium Centre in Cardiff.

In January 2007, Nuttall performed on BBC Radio 2's Friday Night is Music Night with an 80-piece live orchestra and in May 2007, she joined the cast of the stage revival of Boeing-Boeing at the Comedy Theatre opposite Patricia Hodge, Mark Rylance and Roger Allam. On 2 October 2007, Nuttall replaced Kim Medcalf in the London production of Cabaret at the Lyric Theatre, transferring directly from her role in Boeing-Boeing. In April 2008, Nuttall's initial six-month contract was extended until the production's closure on 21 June. Nuttall appeared in Hotel Babylon in 2009 as Melanie Hughes, the new hotel receptionist.

In June and July 2010, Nuttall played one of the lead roles in the revival of the hit musical The Hired Man at the Octagon Theatre, Bolton. Later that year, she returned to the Octagon Theatre, Bolton to play Stella Kowalski in the Tennessee Williams classic A Streetcar Named Desire. She shared the role of the Lady of the Lake in the UK tour of Spamalot, which began on 18 October 2010 at the Edinburgh Playhouse. From September 2011, Nuttall began appearing in the second series of Downton Abbey, appearing as the new maid, Ethel.

In December 2011, she appeared in Noises Off at London's Old Vic until March 2012. On 14 July 2011, Nuttall was awarded an Honorary Degree of Doctor of Arts by the University of Bolton. On 8 June 2013, Nuttall starred in the Saturday Drama on BBC Radio 4. Entitled The Weather Girl, she played the lead role of Abigail, a prisoner whose mental state is assessed by a clinical psychologist.

In 2019, Nuttall lent her voice to Olga in HISTORY's podcast Letters of Love in WW2 - a series based on the real-life letters of a couple separated by the Second World War.

In 2024, Nuttall played a grown-up "Little" Jane Butterfield in Beetlejuice Beetlejuice, a sequel to 1988's Beetlejuice, replacing Rachel Mittelman, who originated the role in the original film.

== Personal life ==
Nuttall was in a relationship with fellow Emmerdale cast member Ben Freeman for four years. She married actor Andrew Buchan on 8 September 2012, having been in a relationship since 2007. They have two children, a daughter and a son. In February 2023, it was reported the couple had separated before Christmas.

== Filmography ==
=== Film ===
Year	Title	Role	Notes
2014	The Keeping Room	Moll	
2015	Despite the Falling Snow	Maya	
2018	Who Is My Husband?	Sabrina	Alternative title: My Husband's Double Life
2024	Beetlejuice Beetlejuice	Jane Butterfield	
TBA	After the War	Margaret	Pre-production

=== Television ===
Year	Title	Role	Notes
2000–2005	Emmerdale	Chloe Atkinson	178 episodes
2009	Hotel Babylon	Melanie Hughes	Series 4; episodes 7 & 8
2011–2012	Downton Abbey	Ethel Parks	Series 2 & 3; 16 episodes
2013	By Any Means	Hollie Goodridge	Mini-series; episode 4
2013	Moving On	Toni	Series 5; episode 4: "Hush Little Baby"
2014	The Musketeers	Agnès	Series 1; episode 6: "The Exiles"
2014–2015	New Tricks	Caitlin Standing	Series 11; episodes 1 & 10, & series 12; episodes 1 & 2
2015	Death in Paradise	Sal Tyler	Series 4; episode 4
2016	Moving On	Debra	Series 8; episode 3: "Burden"
2020	Liar	Winnie Peterson	Series 2; episodes 1–6
2021	All Creatures Great & Small	Phyllis Dalby	Series 2; episode 3 & 6: "We Can But Hope" & "Home Truths"
2022	Why Didn't They Ask Evans?	Sylvia Bassington-ffrench	Mini-series; episodes 2 & 3
2023	The Chemistry of Death	Grace Strachan	Episodes 4–6
2023	Mr Bates vs The Post Office	Lisa Castleton	Mini-series; episodes 1–4
2025	Silent Witness	Peggy	Series 28; episodes 9 & 10: "I Believe in Love...: Parts 1 & 2"
2025	The Feud	Sonia Spence	Episodes 1–6
2026	Forever Home	Carol Crottie	Lead role; episodes 1–6

== Awards and nominations ==
Year	Award	Category	Result	Ref.
2001	TV Quick Awards	Best New Actor/Actress	Nominated	
2002	The British Soap Awards	Sexiest Female	Nominated	
2003	The British Soap Awards	Sexiest Female	Nominated	
2004	The British Soap Awards	Sexiest Female	Nominated	
2005	The British Soap Awards	Sexiest Female	Nominated	
