= The Body Is Water =

Irish drama film

- Directed by: Vicky Wight
- Screenplay by: Vicky Wight
- Produced by: Vicky Wight; Geoff Linville; Syndey Augusta Huynh; John Norton
- Starring: Isiah Whitlock Jr.; Saoirse-Monica Jackson; Stephen Rea; Aidan Quinn; Eva Birthistle; Aunjanue Ellis-Taylor; Allen Leech
- Production companies: Dark Day Pictures; TBIW Films; Red Ted Media; LC Jammers
- Countries: Ireland; United States
- Language: English

The Body Is Water is an upcoming Irish/American film written and directed by Vicky Wight and starring Isiah Whitlock Jr. (in his final film appearance), Saoirse-Monica Jackson, Stephen Rea, Aidan Quinn, Eva Birthistle, Aunjanue Ellis-Taylor, and Allen Leech.

== Premise ==
A grieving man disappears to a small Irish village but his anonymity proves difficult to find there.

== Cast ==
- Isiah Whitlock Jr. as David Alexander Wilkins
- Saoirse-Monica Jackson as Lou
- Aunjanue Ellis-Taylor as Ree
- Stephen Rea as Mr. M
- Aidan Quinn as John Umley
- Eva Birthistle as Ruth
- Allen Leech as Brendan
- Fionnula Flanagan as Mrs. O'Rourke
- Maria Doyle Kennedy as Helen
- Bronagh Gallagher as Cora

== Production ==
The film is from Irish writer-director Vicky Wight who also produces alongside Geoff Linville, Syndey Augusta Huynh, and John Norton of Red Ted Media.

The cast is led by Saoirse-Monica Jackson, Isiah Whitlock Jr., Stephen Rea, Aidan Quinn and Eva Birthistle and also features Aunjanue Ellis-Taylor, Allen Leech, Fionnula Flanagan, Maria Doyle Kennedy and Bronagh Gallagher. This will be the final film role of Whitlock, who died in December 2025.

Principal photography took place in County Cork and Houston, Texas and had finished by 1 September 2025.
