= Isiah Whitlock Jr. =

American actor (1954–2025)

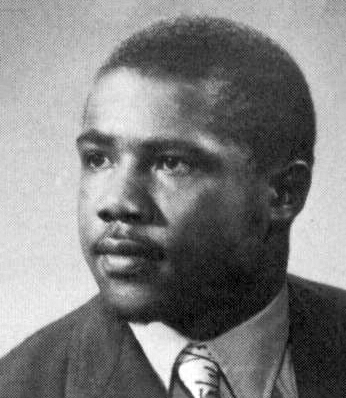
- High school yearbook portrait, 1972
- Born: September 13, 1954; South Bend, Indiana, U.S.
- Died: December 30, 2025 (aged 71); New York City, U.S.
- Education: Southwest Minnesota State University (BA); American Conservatory Theater (MFA)
- Occupation: Actor
- Years active: 1981–2025

Isiah Whitlock Jr. (September 13, 1954 – December 30, 2025) was an American actor. He is best known for his role as corrupt state senator Clay Davis on the HBO television series The Wire, and for his frequent collaborations with filmmaker Spike Lee.

Whitlock appeared in many other films and television series, accumulating over 120 acting credits throughout his career. He also acted in some theater productions. He had a unique pronunciation of shit ("sheeeeeeeee-it") that appeared in much of his work.

== Early life ==
Whitlock was born in South Bend, Indiana, on September 13, 1954, and attended John Adams High School, graduating in 1972. He was a star player on that school's football team and got an athletic scholarship to play football at Southwest Minnesota State University (SMSU) in Marshall, Minnesota. Injuries led him to stop playing football and after getting a part in a rendition of The Crucible he focused on acting. After graduating in 1976, he moved to San Francisco and joined the American Conservatory Theater. From c. 1990 until 2021 he lived in Chelsea, Manhattan, New York City.

== Career ==
Whitlock's first notable role came in 1987, when he appeared in an episode of the police procedural Cagney & Lacey. Early in his career he had minor roles in the 1990 films Goodfellas and Gremlins 2: The New Batch, an appearance in the soap opera As the World Turns, and an appearance in Law & Order, the first of multiple appearances in it and various franchise spinoffs. Whitlock also made appearances on Chappelle's Show and had a supporting role in the 2003 film Pieces of April. He had roles in the 2007 films 1408 and Enchanted. He appeared in promotional spots for the 2009 Wii video game Punch-Out!!, portraying the character Doc Louis. Whitlock first collaborated with Spike Lee in Lee's 2002 film 25th Hour and would later appear in his 2004 film She Hate Me, 2012 film Red Hook Summer, 2015 film Chi-Raq, 2017 television show She's Gotta Have It, 2018 film BlacKkKlansman, and 2020 film Da 5 Bloods.

Whitlock is best known for his role on the HBO television series The Wire as corrupt state senator Clay Davis. The Wire premiered in 2002 and ended in 2008; Whitlock had a recurring role in the show's first four seasons and was a part of the main cast in its fifth and final season. The New York Times said that his performance in the fifth season "got to the core" of the series central themes and that a speech Whitlock imbued with "a mesmerizing, vaudevillian phoniness" had earned him an Emmy, even if all of his prior work on the show was disregarded.

After appearing in The Wire, Whitlock became a well-known character actor. Throughout his career, he accumulated more than 120 credits in film and television. Whitlock played an insurance agent named Ronald Wilkes in the 2011 film Cedar Rapids. Wilkes is a self-described fan of The Wire and during the film Whitlock does an impersonation of Omar Little, a gangster in the series. Whitlock said that the references to the series were written before he became involved. He recurred on the HBO political satire series Veep as George Maddox, a U.S. Secretary of Defense and presidential candidate. Whitlock was part of the main cast of the 2013 television series Lucky 7. He played Sheriff Gene Dentler in the 2016 film Pete's Dragon, a remake of the 1977 film of the same name. He had a recurring role in the 2018 television series The Good Cop, with Brian Tallerico of RogerEbert.com thinking his skills were wasted in the role. In the series Atlanta, he played Raleigh Marks, the father of main character Earn Marks, who was played by series creator Donald Glover. Whitlock played a corrupt New Orleans politician in the television series Your Honor. Whitlock's last appearance in film was in Cocaine Bear and his last appearance on television was as a part of the main cast of The Residence, a murder mystery set in the White House. He is a voice actor in Hoppers, which received a posthumous release, and appears in The Body Is Water, which will also be released posthumously.

Whitlock also performed in many off-Broadway and Broadway plays. He made his Broadway debut in the 1989 play Mastergate, was in the ensemble of the 1990 Broadway production of The Merchant of Venice, and understudied in the 1999 Broadway production of The Iceman Cometh. He was a member of the Atlantic Theater Company and starred in many off-Broadway productions, including in Farrugut North. Whitlock was nominated for the Lucille Lortel Award for Outstanding Featured Actor in a Play in 2002 for his performance in Four. Whitlock also toured nationally in a production of The Piano Lesson.

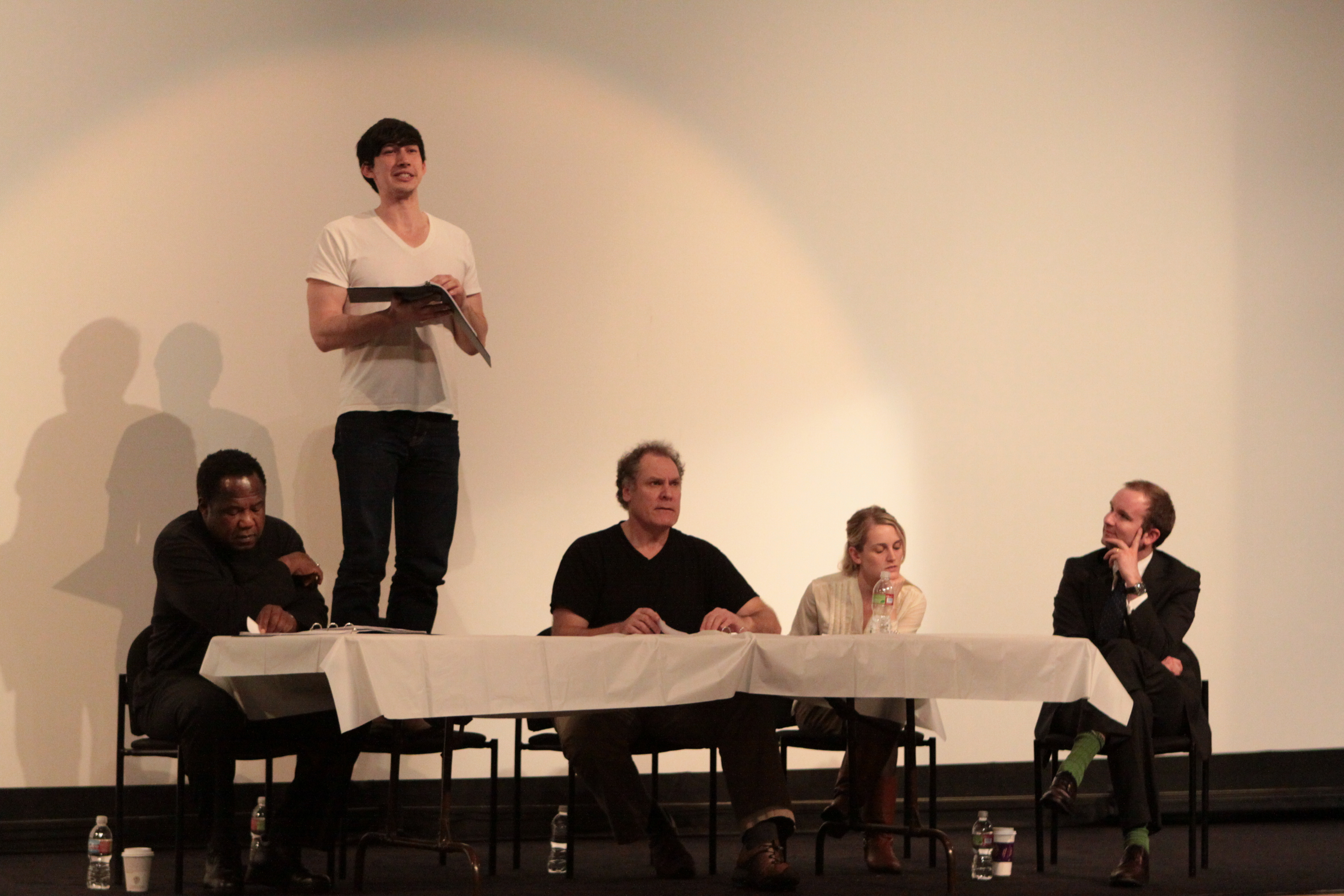
Whitlock (left) with Adam Driver, Jay O. Sanders, and Joanne Tucker at Camp Pendleton in 2008

Whitlock is well known for the distinct way he pronounced shit ("sheeeeeeeee-it"). Whitlock said that he picked up the pronunciation from an uncle who used it. While filming 25th Hour, Whitlock said that Lee heard him use it in conversation and encouraged him to use it in the film, with the phrase then making its on-screen debut in it. Soon thereafter Whitlock began filming The Wire, and Whitlock said that the phrase, with his distinct pronunciation indicated, was already present in the script. Whitlock's use of the phrase in The Wire made it very popular and it became an enduring part of his legacy. Whitlock would also use it in other Lee films, such as She Hates Me, BlacKkKlansman, and Da 5 Bloods. Whitlock created an academy to teach actors how to say the phrase and sold talking bobbleheads of himself which said the phrase after a successful Kickstarter campaign in 2015. The campaign met its $12,500 goal in less than a day and eventually raised over $100,000 from 1,828 backers. Prior to the bobblehead's release, Whitlock said he gave the only prototype to The Wire showrunner David Simon, and Simon said that he showed it to then-President Barack Obama; Simon said that Obama enjoyed and kept it. Whitlock appeared in the documentary series History of Swear Words.

SMSU now offers the Isiah Whitlock Jr. Endowed Scholarship. He was SMSU's commencement speaker in 1999 and guest artist for the school's celebration of Black History Month in 2007. The Marshall Independent called Whitlock perhaps SMSU's most prominent alumni.

== Death ==
Whitlock died after a short illness at a New York City hospital on December 30, 2025, at the age of 71.

== Partial filmography ==
=== Film ===
Isiah Whitlock Jr.' film credits
Year	Title	Role	Notes	Ref.
1990	Gremlins 2: The New Batch	Fireman		
1990	Goodfellas	Doctor		
1997	The Spanish Prisoner	Trooper		
2001	Jump Tomorrow	George's Uncle		
2002	25th Hour	Agent Flood		
2003	Pieces of April	Eugene		
2004	She Hate Me	Agent Amos Flood		
2005	Kettle of Fish	Freddie		
2007	1408	Hotel Engineer		
2007	Enchanted	Ethan Banks		
2008	Cadillac Records	Mississippi DJ		
2011	Gun Hill Road	Officer Thompson		
2011	Cedar Rapids	Ronald Wilkes		
2011	Detachment	Mr. Mathias		
2012	Red Hook Summer	Detective Flood		
2012	Why Stop Now	Black		
2012	Thanks for Sharing	Charles		
2012	Not Fade Away	Landers		
2013	Newlyweeds	Philly		
2013	Europa Report	Dr. Tarik Pamuk		
2013	Home	Samuel		
2014	The Angriest Man in Brooklyn	Yates		
2014	23 Blast	Dr. Connelly		
2015	Chi-Raq	Bacchos		
2016	Pete's Dragon	Sheriff Gene Dentler		
2017	Person to Person	Buster		
2017	CHiPs	Peterson		
2017	Cars 3	River Scott	Voice	
2018	BlacKkKlansman	Mr. Turrentine		
2018	All Square	Scotty		
2019	Corporate Animals	Derek		
2019	Lost Holiday	Matthews		
2019	Lying and Stealing	Lyman Wilkers		
2019	Run with the Hunted	Lester		
2020	The Lost Husband	Russ McAllen		
2020	Da 5 Bloods	Melvin		
2020	I Care a Lot	Judge Lomax		
2022	Lightyear	Commander Burnside	Voice	
2023	Cocaine Bear	Bob		
2026	Hoppers	Bird King	Voice; posthumous release	
TBA	The Body Is Water †	David Alexander Wilkins	Post-production; posthumous release	

=== Television ===
Isiah Whitlock Jr.' television credits
Year	Title	Role	Notes	Ref.
1981	A Christmas Carol	Second Charitable Gentleman / Party Guest	Television movie	
1987	Cagney & Lacey	Man Getting a Cab	Episode: "The City is Burning"	
1992	As the World Turns	Dr. Phelan	1 episode	
1995–2004	Law & Order	Various	5 episodes	
2000–2005	Law & Order: Special Victims Unit	Various	3 episodes	
2001, 2011	Law & Order: Criminal Intent	Detective	3 episodes	
2002–2008	The Wire	State Sen. R. Clayton "Clay" Davis	Main; 25 episodes	
2003, 2006	Chappelle's Show	Harold, Store Manager	Episode #1.8, Episode #3.2; Uncredited	
2010	Meet the Browns	Sidney Graves	Episode: "Meet the Other Man"	
2010	Rubicon	Mr. Roy	Recurring; 6 episodes	
2012	Smash	Ronal Strickland	2 episodes	
2012–2015	Law & Order: Special Victims Unit	Captain Reece	3 episodes	
2013	Lucky 7	Bob Harris	Main cast; 6 episodes	
2013–2015	Veep	George Maddox	Recurring; 7 episodes	
2016, 2022	Atlanta	Raleigh Marks	Episodes: "The Big Bang", "Light Skinned-ed"	
2017	The Mist	Gus Redman / Gus Bradley	Recurring; 8 episodes	
2018	The Good Cop	Burl Loomis	10 episodes	
2020–2023	Your Honor	Charlie Figaro	Main, 19 episodes	
2021	History of Swear Words	Himself	2 episodes	
2022	The Kings of Napa	Reginald King	Episode: "Pilot"	
2025	The Residence	Larry Dokes	Main role; 8 episodes	
2026	Power Book III: Raising Kanan	Lump Maxwell	Episode: #5.8 - "Unconditional Love"	

=== Video games ===
Isiah Whitlock Jr.' video game credits
Year	Title	Role	Notes	Ref.
2013	Grand Theft Auto V	The Local Population	Voice role	

== Accolades ==
Award	Year	Play	Role	Result	Ref.
Lucille Lortel Award for Outstanding Featured Actor in a Play	2002	Four	Joe	Nominated	
