= The Feud (TV series) =

British television series

- Genre: Drama
- Created by: Aschlin Ditta
- Directed by: Andy de Emmony
- Starring: Jill Halfpenny; Rupert Penry-Jones; Larry Lamb; James Fleet; Tessa Peake-Jones; Amy Nuttall; Chris Gascoyne; Jamie-Lee O'Donnell; Ray Fearon; Megan Trower
- Country of origin: United Kingdom
- No. of series: 1
- No. of episodes: 6

Production
- Executive producers: Aschlin Ditta; Andy de Emmony
- Producer: Lesley Douglas
- Running time: 50 minutes
- Production company: Lonesome Pine Productions

Original release
- Network: Channel 5
- Release: 14 April – 23 April 2025

The Feud is a British six-part television drama that aired on Channel 5 from 14 to 23 April 2025. Its ensemble cast includes Jill Halfpenny, Rupert Penry-Jones, Larry Lamb, James Fleet, Tessa Peake-Jones, Amy Nuttall, Chris Gascoyne, Jamie-Lee O'Donnell, Ray Fearon and Megan Trower.

== Premise ==
Neighbours on an idyllic suburban street come to blows over one family's plan to build an extension on their property.

== Cast ==
- Jill Halfpenny as Emma Barnett
- Jamie-Lee O'Donnell as PC Gallagher
- Larry Lamb as Terry Dobson
- Amy Nuttall as Sonia Spence
- Rupert Penry-Jones as John Barnett
- Ray Fearon as Alan Spence
- Tessa Peake-Jones as Barbara Abshire
- James Fleet as Derek Abshire
- Megan Trower as Beth Barnett
- Alex Macqueen as Nick Hewitt
- Chris Gascoyne as Lee Hatby
- Judith Alexander as The Magistrate
- Joel Beckett as Ian Casey
- Luke Hammond as Marcus Abshire
- Joel Kai Ali as Abul Masood

== Production ==
The six-part drama series is produced by Lonesome Pine Productions, in association with Banijay Rights and North East Screen. It is written and created by Aschlin Ditta, and directed by Andy de Emmony, with Lesley Douglas producing for Lonesome Pine Productions, and Aschlin Ditta and Andy de Emmony as executive producers.

The cast includes Jill Halfpenny, Jamie-Lee O'Donnell, Amy Nuttall, Rupert Penry-Jones, Ray Fearon, Tessa Peake-Jones, James Fleet and Megan Trower.

Filming took place in Newcastle and Jarrow in May 2024. Three houses in the same street of Benton, Tyne and Wear, were used.

== Broadcast ==
The series was aired on Channel 5 on 14 April 2025. It was shown internationally also, being broadcast on Virgin Media One in the Republic of Ireland during July and August 2025.

== Reception ==
Benji Wilson in The Daily Telegraph gave the series one star and criticised it for "unoriginality". He did praise the cast, saying that "there are one or two reasons to stick with The Feud but they extend only to a strong cast (Jill Halfpenny, Rupert Penry Jones, Adam [sic.] Macqueen, Louisa Harland, James Fleet) doing their damnedest with limited material; and some unintended comedy".

Carol Midgely in The Times gave the series three stars, and said that it "is so knowingly naff I am strangely hooked. I wonder actually if it is subtly sending up the genre" and that "drama cleverly taps into a modern malaise and, despite its mundanity and often shonky dialogue, harnesses the sheer toxicity of neighbour disputes that in real life can escalate".
