= Sean Delaney (actor) =

British actor

- Delaney at the 2026 BFI London Film Festival
- Born: 20 March 1994 (age 32); London, England
- Education: Royal Academy of Dramatic Art
- Notable work: Killing Eve

Sean Delaney is a British-born actor of Irish descent. He is best known for his role in the TV series Killing Eve.

== Early life ==
Delaney was born in London to Irish parents. His grandfather from his father's side emigrated from Ireland to work in the capital as a mechanic and a singer on the Irish Dance-Hall Circuit. After finishing secondary school, Delaney trained at the Royal Academy of Dramatic Art, from which he graduated in 2015.

== Career ==
Delaney made his stage debut in Beth Steel's "messy but compelling" drama Labyrinth that was produced at the Hampstead Theatre in 2016, earning a place on the Evening Standard's Theatre Emerging Talent Award list. In 2017, he made his onscreen debut as a guest in a Midsomer murders episode.

In 2018, Delaney played Michael Carney in Jez Butterworth's hit play The Ferryman, directed by Sam Mendes and staged in the Gielgud Theatre. Subsequently, he was invited to work in the Stateside production of the play that was staged on Broadway's Bernard B. Jacobs Theatre.

The same year, he was cast as Kenny Stowton, an ex-hacker recruited by MI6, in BBC's hit black comedy-spy thriller TV series Killing Eve. His "quirky, fan-favorite" character started off as a temporary one but turned into a "re-occurring and quite integral" part of the hit show. Head writer Suzanne Heathcote rated his work in the series as "brilliant."

In 2022, Delaney started working in the Charlie Stratton-directed film Seacole, along with Sam Worthington, Gugu Mbatha-Raw, and Rupert Graves.

== Personal life ==
Delaney supports football club Fulham F.C., with his father and grandfather, as he related, having also been fans. In 2020, he did an open interview on Reddit's "Ask me anything" series.
