= The Ferryman (play) =

2017 play by Jez Butterworth

- Official production artwork
- Original language: English
- Written by: Jez Butterworth
- Genre: Drama
- Setting: Rural County Armagh, 1981

Premiere
- Date: 24 April 2017
- Place: Royal Court Theatre

The Ferryman is a 2017 play by Jez Butterworth. Set during the Troubles, it tells the story of the family of a former IRA volunteer, living in their farmhouse in rural County Armagh, Northern Ireland in 1981.

== Synopsis ==
The play is set in a farmhouse in County Armagh, Northern Ireland in 1981. It is harvest day in 1981 and a multi-generational Irish Catholic farming family consisting of Quinn, Mary, and their seven children share their rural home with Uncle Pat, Aunt Mary, Aunt Pat, Quinn's sister-in-law Caitlin, and her son Oisin. Caitlin's husband 'disappeared' in 1971 and his remains have been uncovered at a politically sensitive time for the Republican Movement.

== Production history ==
Butterworth was first inspired to write the play in 2012 when his long time partner, actress Laura Donnelly, told him about the murder of her maternal uncle, Eugene Simons, at the hands of the IRA; Simons' name had appeared on screen while the couple were watching a documentary about The Disappeared.

=== London (2017) ===
The Ferryman had its world premiere at the Royal Court Theatre on 24 April 2017 running to 20 May, directed by Sam Mendes. It was the fastest-selling play in Royal Court Theatre history. The cast included Paddy Considine, Laura Donnelly, Genevieve O'Reilly, Bríd Brennan, Fra Fee, John Hodgkinson, Stuart Graham, Gerard Horan, Carla Langley, Des McAleer, Conor MacNeill, Rob Malone, Dearbhla Molloy, Eugene O'Hare and Niall Wright.

=== West End (2017–2018) ===
The production transferred to the Gielgud Theatre, opening on 29 June 2017, following previews from 20 June. After a first cast change on 9 October 2017 with William Houston (Quinn Carney), Sarah Greene (Caitlin Carney), Ivan Kaye (Tom Kettle) and others joining the company, a second cast change took place on 8 January 2018, featuring Rosalie Craig (as Caitlin Carney), Owen McDonnell (as Quinn Carney), Laurie Kynaston (as Oisin Carney), Saoirse-Monica Jackson (as Shena Carney) Sean Delaney (as Michael Carney), Kevin Creedon (as JJ Carney), Francis Mezza (as Shane Corcoran), Terence Keeley (as Diarmaid Corcoran), and Justin Edwards. The production closed on 19 May 2018.

=== Broadway (2018–2019) ===
The production transferred to the Bernard B. Jacobs Theatre on Broadway, beginning previews on 2 October 2018 with many members of the London cast. The play, which went on to win four Tony Awards, including Best Play, closed on 7 July 2019.

== Cast and characters ==
Role	Royal Court	West End	Broadway
Role	2017		2018
Aunt Maggie Far Away	Brid Brennan	Brid Brennan	Fionnula Flanagan
Lawrence Malone	Turlough Convery	Turlough Convery	Glenn Speers
Michael Carney	Fra Fee	Fra Fee	Fra Fee
Muldoon	Stuart Graham	Stuart Graham	Stuart Graham
Tom Kettle	John Hodgkinson	John Hodgkinson	Justin Edwards
Shena Carney	Carla Langley	Carla Langley	Carla Langley
Diarmaid Corcoran	Conor MacNeill	Conor MacNeill	Conor MacNeill
Aunt Pat	Dearbhla Molloy	Dearbhla Molloy	Dearbhla Molloy
Mary Carney	Genevieve O'Reilly	Genevieve O'Reilly	Genevieve O'Reilly
Quinn Carney	Paddy Considine	Paddy Considine	Paddy Considine
Caitlin Carney	Laura Donnelly	Laura Donnelly	Laura Donnelly
Shane Corcoran	Tom Glynn-Carney	Tom Glynn-Carney	Tom Glynn-Carney
Father Horrigan	Gerard Horan	Gerard Horan	Charles Dale
Uncle Pat	Des McAleer	Des McAleer	Mark Lambert
Oisin Carney	Rob Malone	Rob Malone	Rob Malone
Frank Magennis	Eugene O'Hare	Eugene O'Hare	Dean Ashton
JJ Carney	Niall Wright	Niall Wright	Niall Wright
Mercy Carney	Elise Alexandre; Darcey Conway; Darcy Jacobs; Scarlett Nunes; Scarlett Jolly		Willow McCarthy
Honor Carney	Sophia Ally; Grace Doherty	Sophia Ally; Grace Doherty	Matilda Lawler
Nunu Carney	Clara Murphy; Angel O'Callaghan; Isla Griffiths	Clara Murphy; Angel O'Callaghan; Isla Griffiths	Brooklyn Shuck
Declan Corcoran	Michael McCarthy; Xavier Moras Spencer; Jack Nuttall	Michael McCarthy; Xavier Moras Spencer; Jack Nuttall	Michael Quinton McArthur

=== Notable cast replacements ===
==== West End (2017–2018) ====
- Aunt Maggie Far Away: Maureen Beattie
- Tom Kettle: Ivan Kaye, Justin Edwards
- Mary Carney: Catherine McCormack
- Quinn Carney: William Houston, Owen McDonnell
- Caitlin Carney: Sarah Greene, Rosalie Craig
- Shane Corcoran: Laurie Davidson
- Oisin Carney: Laurie Kynaston
- Michael Carney: Sean Delaney
- Shena Carney: Saoirse-Monica Jackson

==== Broadway (2018–2019) ====
- Quinn Carney: Brian d'Arcy James
- Caitlin Carney: Holley Fain
- Mary Carney: Emily Bergl
- Uncle Pat: Fred Applegate
- Muldoon: Ralph Brown
- Michael Carney: Sean Delaney
- Tom Kettle: Shuler Hensley

== Awards and nominations ==
=== Original London production ===
Year	Award	Category	Nominee	Result
2017	Evening Standard Theatre Award	Best Play	Jez Butterworth	Won
2017	Evening Standard Theatre Award	Best Actress	Laura Donnelly	Nominated
2017	Evening Standard Theatre Award	Best Director	Sam Mendes	Won
2017	Evening Standard Theatre Award	Emerging Talent	Tom Glynn-Carney	Won
2017	Critics’ Circle Theatre Award	Best New Play	Jez Butterworth	Won
2018	Laurence Olivier Award	Best New Play		Won
2018	Laurence Olivier Award	Best Actor	Paddy Considine	Nominated
2018	Laurence Olivier Award	Best Actress	Laura Donnelly	Won
2018	Laurence Olivier Award	Best Actor in a Supporting Role	John Hodgkinson	Nominated
2018	Laurence Olivier Award	Best Actress in a Supporting Role	Bríd Brennan	Nominated
2018	Laurence Olivier Award	Best Actress in a Supporting Role	Dearbhla Molloy	Nominated
2018	Laurence Olivier Award	Best Director	Sam Mendes	Won
2018	Laurence Olivier Award	Best Set Design	Rob Howell	Nominated
2018	WhatsOnStage Award	Best New Play		Won
2018	WhatsOnStage Award	Best Supporting Actor in a Play	Fra Fee	Won
2018	WhatsOnStage Award	Best Director	Sam Mendes	Won

=== Original Broadway production ===
Year	Award	Category	Nominee	Result
2019	Tony Award	Best Play		Won
2019	Tony Award	Best Performance by an Actor in a Leading Role in a Play	Paddy Considine	Nominated
2019	Tony Award	Best Performance by an Actress in a Leading Role in a Play	Laura Donnelly	Nominated
2019	Tony Award	Best Performance by an Actress in a Featured Role in a Play	Fionnula Flanagan	Nominated
2019	Tony Award	Best Direction of a Play	Sam Mendes	Won
2019	Tony Award	Best Scenic Design of a Play	Rob Howell	Won
2019	Tony Award	Best Costume Design of a Play	Rob Howell	Won
2019	Tony Award	Best Lighting Design of a Play	Peter Mumford	Nominated
2019	Tony Award	Best Sound Design of a Play	Nick Powell	Nominated
2019	Drama Desk Award	Outstanding Play		Won
2019	Drama Desk Award	Outstanding Featured Actor in a Play	Tom Glynn-Carney	Won
2019	Drama Desk Award	Outstanding Director of a Play	Sam Mendes	Won
2019	Drama Desk Award	Outstanding Sound Design in a Play	Nick Powell	Won
2019	Drama League Award	Outstanding Production of a Broadway or Off-Broadway Play		Won
2019	Drama League Award	Distinguished Performance	Paddy Considine	Nominated
2019	New York Drama Critics' Circle Award	Best Play	Jez Butterworth	Won
2019	Outer Critics Circle Award	Outstanding New Broadway Play		Won
2019	Outer Critics Circle Award	Outstanding Featured Actress in a Play	Fionnula Flanagan	Nominated
2019	Outer Critics Circle Award	Outstanding Director of a Play	Sam Mendes	Won
2019	Outer Critics Circle Award	Outstanding Scenic Design (Play or Musical)	Rob Howell	Nominated
2019	Outer Critics Circle Award	Outstanding Costume Design (Play or Musical)	Rob Howell	Nominated
2019	Theatre World Award		Paddy Considine	Honouree
2019	Theatre World Award		Tom Glynn-Carney	Honouree
