= Leonard and Hungry Paul =

Irish-British television series

- Genre: Comedy drama
- Based on: Leonard and Hungry Paul by Rónán Hession
- Written by: Richie Conroy; Mark Hodkinson
- Directed by: Andrew Chaplin
- Starring: Alex Lawther; Laurie Kynaston; Jamie-Lee O'Donnell
- Narrated by: Julia Roberts
- Countries of origin: Republic of Ireland; United Kingdom
- Original language: English
- No. of series: 1
- No. of episodes: 6

Production
- Executive producers: Tristan Orpen Lynch; Aoife O’Sullivan; Adam Barth; Kate McColgan; Wally Hall; David Harari; Morwin Schmookler; Ross Boucher; George Rush
- Production companies: Subotica; Avalon; Screen Ireland

Original release
- Network: RTÉ; BBC Northern Ireland
- Release: 17 October 2025 – present

Leonard and Hungry Paul is an Irish-British comedy drama television series for RTÉ and BBC Northern Ireland. It is an adaptation of the novel of the same name by Rónán Hession and premiered on 17 October 2025. The series is narrated by Julia Roberts and follows the quiet, introspective lives of two friends navigating small but meaningful changes in suburban Dublin. It combines gentle humour with character-driven storytelling, emphasising friendship, personal growth, and the subtle drama of ordinary life.

== Premise ==
Leonard and Hungry Paul are two friends who bond over board games in suburban Dublin. Leonard is a reserved writer of children’s encyclopaedias who has lived a largely solitary life, while Hungry Paul is more easygoing and content with casual employment. When Leonard experiences a personal loss, the pair navigate subtle changes in their routines, relationships, and social lives. The series explores themes of friendship, personal growth, and the quiet value of ordinary life, balancing gentle humour with introspective character development. The narrative focuses on small, meaningful moments rather than dramatic events, emphasising character interactions and emotional nuance.

== Cast and characters ==
- Alex Lawther as Leonard
- Laurie Kynaston as Hungry Paul
- Jamie-Lee O'Donnell as Shelley
- Julia Roberts as Narrator (voice)
- Helen Behan as Helen
- Lorcan Cranitch as Peter
- Niamh Branigan as Grace
- Kathleen Reen as Mrs. Hawthorn
- Paul Reid as Mark Baxter
- David O'Reilly as Greg
- Tony Cantwell as Radio DJ (voice)
- Charlotte McCurry as Rhona
- Amelia Crowley as Elizabeth, Leonard's mother
- Leon Foy Hebib as Young Leonard

== Production ==
The six-part series was adapted by Richie Conroy and Mark Hodkinson from the 2019 novel Leonard and Hungry Paul by Rónán Hession. It is directed by Andrew Chaplin and produced by Subotica for BBC Northern Ireland in association with BBC Comedy, Screen Ireland and RTÉ. Avalon serves as co-producer and handles international distribution.

The cast is led by Alex Lawther as Leonard, Laurie Kynaston as Hungry Paul, and Jamie-Lee O'Donnell as Shelley. Supporting cast includes Helen Behan and Lorcan Cranitch. The series is narrated by Julia Roberts, who said: "Leonard and Hungry Paul is such a magical book. I am delighted to be a tiny part of this novel becoming a television series."

Filming took place in Dublin in May 2025, with first-look images and promotional material released in August 2025.

== Broadcast ==
The series premiered on BBC One Northern Ireland and BBC iPlayer on 17 October 2025, and on BBC Two on 20 October.

== Reception ==
Chris Wasser in the Irish Independent described the show as "Beautiful, heartfelt television" and "Funny, charming and unexpectedly profound" with "more to say about life than most of the shows that clog up our evenings". Sarah Dempster in The Guardian gave the show four stars and implored readers to "Open the doors and windows of your life a little, and let it in". Carol Midgeley in The Times said the series is "slight and undemanding. But it is strangely calming and immersive, offering little moments of profundity", as well as "written with great charm, a warming, relatable watch and a paean to the non-sharp-elbowed".

In January 2026, the series was nominated at the Irish Film & Television Awards for best drama.
