= Laurie Kynaston =

Welsh actor

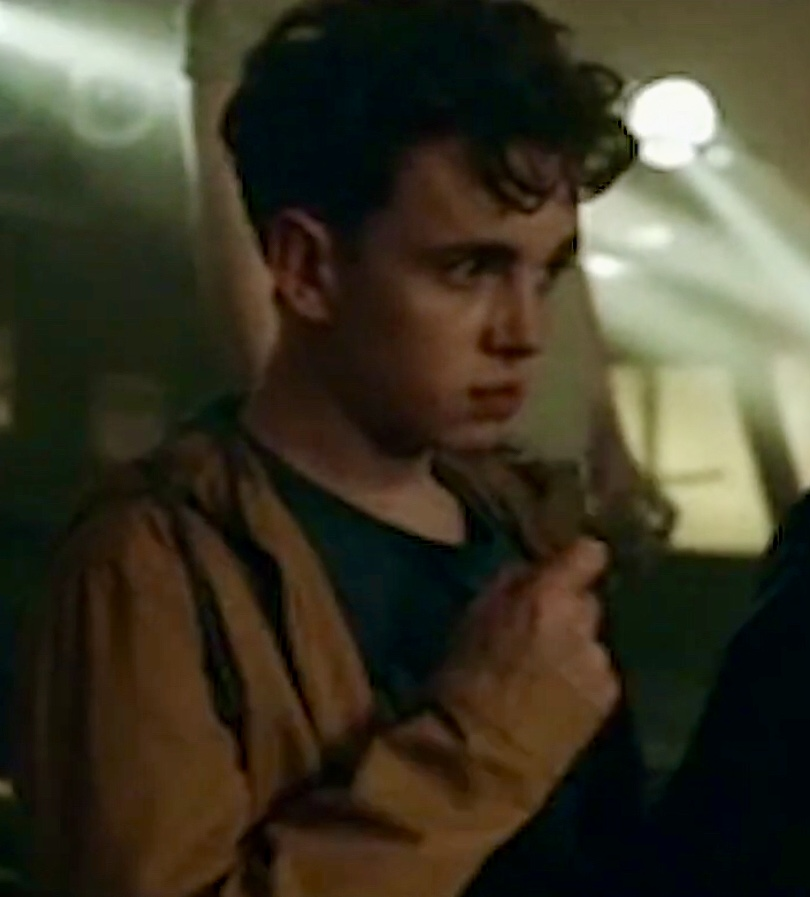
- Kynaston on set of Gloves Off
- Born: Laurence Stephen Kynaston; 24 February 1994 (age 32); Shrewsbury, England
- Years active: 2013–present

Laurence Stephen Kynaston (born 24 February 1994) is a Welsh actor. He won an Evening Standard Theatre Award for his performance in The Son, as well as receiving a WhatsOnStage Award nomination. On television, he starred in the BBC Two sitcom Cradle to Grave (2015). His films include England Is Mine (2017) and How to Build a Girl (2019). He was named a 2018 Screen International Star of Tomorrow.

Kynaston was eighteen when he was cast in The Winslow Boy at Theatr Clwyd. He made his West End debut in The Ferryman when it transferred to the Gielgud Theatre. He starred in the Spring Awakening revival at the Almeida Theatre.

== Early life ==
Kynaston was born in Shrewsbury, the youngest of four boys, and grew up in rural North Wales. His mother is a school nurse and cellist, and his brothers are all musicians. He joined the National Youth Theatre of Wales. He attended Llanfyllin High School. He co-founded the Lonely Tree Theatre Group. He moved to London when he was nineteen.

== Filmography ==
=== Film ===
Year	Title	Role	Notes
2016	Gutterdämmerung	The Kid	
2017	England Is Mine	Johnny Marr	
2017	Gloves Off	Donny	
2018	Four Quartets	Raf	Short film
2018	Wasteland	Stevie	
2019	How to Build a Girl	Krissi Morrigan	
2019	Intrigo: Dear Agnes	Johannes	
2019	Nocturnal	Danny	
2021	Muse	George	
2025	Lady	Sam	

=== Television ===
Year	Title	Role	Notes
2014	Casualty	Ryan Pemberley	Episode: "Survivor's Guilt"
2014	Doctors	Karl Shipley	Episode: "Redirect the Heart"
2014	Our World War	Young British soldier	Miniseries;
2015	Cradle to Grave	Danny Baker	Main role
2015	They Found Hell	Evan	Television film
2016	Murder Games: The Life and Death of Breck Bednar	Breck	Television film
2019–2022	Derry Girls	Philip	2 episodes
2019	The Feed	Jonah Green	4 episodes
2020	The Split	Will Parker	1 episode
2020	The Trouble with Maggie Cole	Liam Myer	Main role
2020	Unprecedented	Tyler	1 episode
2020	Des	Carl Stottor	Miniseries
2020	Urban Myths	Jim	Episode: "When Joan Kissed Barbara"
2021	Britannia	Caius	Episode: "War Chest"
2022	Life After Life	Jimmy Todd	Main role; 2 episodes
2022	The Man Who Fell to Earth	Clive Flood	Recurring role; 3 episodes
2022	The Sandman	Alex Burgess	Episode: "Sleep of the Just"
2023	A Small Light	Casmir Nieuwenburg	Recurring role; 6 episodes
2023	The Doll Factory	John Millais	Main role
2024	Fool Me Once	Corey Rudzinski	6 episodes, mini series
2025	Leonard and Hungry Paul	Hungry Paul	Main role
2026	Believe Me	Frankie Peacock	4 episodes

=== Video games ===
Year	Title	Role	Notes
2019	GreedFall	Various	
2025	Genshin Impact	Durin	

=== Music videos ===
Song	Year	Artist	Notes
"Skinny Love" (Version 2)	2014	Birdy	
"Why Don't We Take A Walk By The Sea?"	2019	The Caress	

== Stage ==
Year	Title	Role	Notes
2013	The Winslow Boy	Ronnie Winslow	Theatr Clwyd, Mold
2015	This Smudge Won't Budge	Smudge	St James Theatre, London
2016	Jumpy	Josh	Theatr Clwyd, Mold
2016	Elegies for Angels, Punks and Raging Queens	Tim	Charing Cross Theatre, London
2018	The Ferryman	Oisin Carney	Gielgud Theatre, London
2019	The Son	Nicolas	Kiln Theatre / Duke of York's Theatre, London
2021	Spring Awakening	Melchior Gabor	Almeida Theatre, London
2023	2023 WhatsOnStage Awards	Host	Prince Of Wales Theatre, London
2023	Mates In Chelsea	Tug Bungay	Royal Court Theatre, London
2024	Bare: A Pop Opera	Peter	London Palladium concert special
2024	Long Day's Journey Into Night	Edmund Tyrone	Wyndham's Theatre, London
2026	The Standard of Living	Friedrich Hayek	Theatre Royal Haymarket

== Audio ==
Year	Title	Role	Notes
2017	What Does the K Stand For?	Dustin	Series 3
2021	Torchwood: Curios	Brent Hall	Big Finish: Monthly Range
2023	Doctor Who: Mind of the Hodiac	The Hodiac	Big Finish: The Lost Stories

== Awards and nominations ==
Year	Award	Category	Work	Result	Ref.
2019	Evening Standard Theatre Awards	Emerging Talent Award	The Son	Won	
2020	WhatsOnStage Awards	Best Actor in a Play	The Son	Nominated	
