= John Hodgkinson (actor, born 1966) =

English stage and television actor

- Born: John Hodgkinson; 21 June 1966 (age 60); Surbiton, Greater London, England
- Occupation: Actor
- Awards: The Journal Performing Artist of the Year (2011)

John Hodgkinson (born 21 June 1966) is an English actor. He is known mostly for his stage work with the Royal Shakespeare Company and for his performance as Tom Kettle in The Ferryman, for which he was nominated as Best Actor in a Supporting Role in the 2018 Laurence Olivier Awards. In 2011, he was named The Journal's Performing Artist of the Year for the part of Chris Mullin in Michael Chaplin's A Walk on Part with the Live Theatre Company.

== Early life ==
Hodgkinson was born in Surbiton, Greater London. He attended the Webber Douglas Academy of Dramatic Art.

== Career ==
Hodgkinson has appeared in Best of Enemies in London’s West End, Dear England at the National Theatre, When We Are Married at the Donmar Warehouse, Titus Andronicus at the Hampstead Theatre and Middlemarch at the RSC . Other theatre credits include The Merry Wives of Windsor, The Provoked Wife, Venice Preserved, Twelfth Night, Love's Labour's Lost and Love's Labour's Won for the RSC; The Country Wife and Aristo at Chichester; The Ferryman, The Eleventh Capital and Hangmen (also on Broadway) at the Royal Court; Orson's Shadow at Southwark Playhouse; Donkeys' Years at the Rose, Kingston; The Libertine at the Citizens, Glasgow; White Rabbit Red Rabbit and A Walk on Part (also at Soho Theatre and the Arts) for Live Theatre; His Dark Materials, Hapgood (also at West Yorkshire Playhouse), Uncle Vanya, Murmuring Judges and Racing Demon at Birmingham Rep; Absurdia and The Front Page at the Donmar; and A Midsummer Night’s Dream and The Taming of the Shrew at Regent’s Park.

== Personal life ==
Hodgkinson is based in Tottenham, North London, and is married with two sons, a whippet and, a greyhound. He is a member of the Equity trade union, and is a 'highly skilled' cricketer.

== Filmography ==
=== Film ===
- Firelight (1997) – Carlo
- Thunderpants (2002) – Launch Controller 1
- Skyfall (2012) – Silva's Isolation guard
- Leave to Remain (2013) – Judge
- Heart of Lightness (2014) – Jason Malvern
- Small Axe: "Red, White and Blue" (2020) – Police interviewer
- Napoleon (2023) – Fouche
- Elden Ring (2028) – TBA

=== Television ===
- Inside Victor Lewis-Smith (1993–95) – 'BBC suit' 1
- Sometime, Never (1996) – Kev
- Dad (1997)
- Keeping Mum (1998) – Geoffrey
- Duck Patrol (1998) – Gareth
- Boyz Unlimited (1999) – Steve Peebles
- People Like Us (1999)
- Pure Wickedness (1999) – Colin
- The Peter Principle (2000) – Mike Cooper
- Chambers (2000) – Guy
- Holby City (2001) – Terry Thomson
- Doctors (2001) – Robert Shields
- The Bill (2001) – Mark Pinney
- Lee Evans - So What Now? (2001) – Raymond
- The Estate Agents (2002) – Death Row Client
- EastEnders (2004) – Bowers
- Peep Show (2003–04) – Tony
- My Family (2004) – Registrar / Vicar
- Broken News (2005) – Reporter in the Sea
- Doctors (2005) – Timothy Lutterworth
- Heartbeat (2007) – Brian Rogers
- Criminal Justice (2008) – Rogers
- Holby City (2010) – Glyn Hibbert
- Silk (2012) – DS Roger Berwick
- Big Bad World (2013) – Graham
- Whitechapel (2013) – Sid Walden
- The Escape Artist (2013) – Mr. Hughes
- The Increasingly Poor Decisions of Todd Margaret (2016) – Helicopter Pilot
- Witless (2016) – Sergeant Forrest
- Victoria (2016) – Police Inspector
- Rillington Place (2016) – DCI Griffin
- Life After Life (2022) – Dr Kellet
- Dear England (2026) – Greg Clarke
