= 6Degrees =

- Created by: Matt Evans; Colin O'Donnell; Terry Caffola
- Directed by: Declan Recks; Andrea Harkin; Terry Loane; Paul Riordan; Diarmuid Goggins
- Starring: Georgia Maguire; Niall Wright; Cillian O'Sullivan; Jayne Wisener; Ryan McParland; Jamie-Lee O'Donnell; Lauren Ellis-Steele; Dermot Murphy; Ben Peel
- Composers: Richard Hill & Mark Gordon
- Countries of origin: United Kingdom; Northern Ireland
- Original language: English
- No. of series: 3
- No. of episodes: 18

Production
- Executive producer: Colin O'Donnell
- Running time: 30 minutes
- Production companies: Stirling Film and Television Productions; Northern Ireland Screen

Original release
- Network: BBC2 NI
- Release: 21 February 2012 – 29 April 2015

6Degrees (or Six Degrees) is a Northern Irish dramatic television series about a group of university students living in Belfast. It premiered on 21 February 2012 on BBC2 NI. In July 2013 it also began airing on the Irish channel RTÉ 2 and later on BBC1 NI. The show ran for a total of three series, between 2012 and 2015. It was filmed on location in Northern Ireland.

The series charts the lives of several young students, who befriend one another when they embark on their various degree courses. Each series explores their changing friendships, as they struggle with work, relationships and family life. The show received praise for its diverse and vibrant depiction of present-day Belfast, as well as its lively young cast.

== Cast ==
Character	Actor	Series regular	Recurring
Sandie Morrow	Jayne Wisener	1–3	—N/a
Conor Martin	Cillian O'Sullivan	1–3	—N/a
Eva Maguire	Jamie-Lee O'Donnell	1–3	—N/a
Christopher Leech	Ryan McParland	1–3	—N/a
Danny Burns	Niall Wright	1–2	3
Jess Green	Georgia Maguire	1–2	3
Justin Pollock	Ben Peel	1	2–3
Carly Bonner	Lauren Ellis-Steele	3	1–2
Liam Madigan	Dermot Murphy	3	—N/a
Gary Meadows	Seamus O'Hara	—N/a	1–3
Ronan McCann	Peter Campion	—N/a	1–2
Samantha Thompson	Adele Gribbon	—N/a	2–3
Marty O'Sullivan	Andy Moore	—N/a	3
Gordy	Declan Rodgers	—N/a	3
Shane	Chris Heath	—N/a	2–3

== Main characters ==
- Sandie Morrow (Jayne Wisener), is the idealist of the group, always eager to resolve conflict and lend support. From a privileged family on the Causeway Coast, she is keen to make new friends and explore the big city whilst studying for her degree in accountancy. Kind and somewhat naive, Sandie is easily upset when things go wrong but strives to develop her independence.
- Conor Martin (Cillian O'Sullivan), arrives in Belfast all the way from Cork. Tall, dark and mysterious, he captures the attention of Sandie but must come to terms with his true self. One of the lads, he's always up for the craic and enjoys himself most on the football field. He is loyal to his friends and is studying to be an architect but, with little direction or ambition, his path remains unclear. After college, he returns to Cork before moving to New York.
- Eva Maguire (Jamie-Lee O'Donnell) is from Derry. She arrives in a new city with aspirations of becoming a solicitor. Her frank and impulsive nature often leads to trouble, creating tension with those around her. Eva loves to party and speak her mind but her apparent confidence hides insecurities and a tragic past. She will fiercely defend her friends but tends to put herself first.
- Christopher Leech (Ryan McParland) A geek at heart, Leech (as he prefers to be known) desires acceptance and popularity the most and will do anything to attain it. Loud, boastful and slightly wild, he's always up for adventure and fun. Leech's nemesis is childhood bully Gary Meadows and he has a secret crush on fellow gamer Carly. Above all, Leech wants to embrace the moment and have fun but he soon discovers that life won't always be carefree.
- Jess Green (Georgia Maguire) (series 1–2, recurring 3) Savvy Londoner Jess moves to Belfast for University, leaving behind her boyfriend. Initially, she finds it difficult to adapt to the new city and local lingo but (most) of her housemates make her feel welcome. Sensible and studious, Jess often clashes with Eva and develops a soft spot for Danny. She decides to leave the gang after second year to go travelling but keeps in touch with Sandie. She ultimately returns to Belfast to continue her studies.
- Danny Burns (Niall Wright) (series 1–2, recurring 3) Born and bred in Belfast, Danny is kind and genuine and keen to pursue (and share) his love of film through his studies. His feelings are torn between bright housemate Jess and the ardent Eva. He struggles to cope with his mum's alcoholism but often finds escapism through his new friends and passion. He leaves Belfast, before the end of his final year, after accepting a work placement in London, but still has hopes for love with Eva. He later returns, for unspecified reasons.
- Justin Pollock (Ben Peel) (series 1, recurring 2-3) Self-assured, smart and trendy, Justin is always willing to stand up for his beliefs and won't shy away from confrontation. He meets the rest of the gang through Eva and takes a fancy to Conor but finds it difficult to keep their relationship a secret. He is deeply ambitious and independent, ready to accept any gainful opportunities that come his way. He eventually decides to leave for New York but still pines for Conor.
- Carly Bonner (Lauren Ellis-Steele) (series 3, recurring previously) Hailing from Glasgow, Carly is a friendly, caring and insightful girl. She quickly develops an attraction to Leech based on their mutual love of gaming. Loyal and committed, she soon befriends the rest of the gang but is frustrated by Leech's apparent fickle ways. She eventually moves into the house with the others and faces a major life decision that will ultimately affect her relationship with Leech.
- Liam Madigan (Dermot Murphy) (series 3) Liam crashes onto the scene just as the friends are preparing for their final semester, taking Danny's place in the house. He wastes no time making a move on Conor and causing mischief for the friends with his roguish ways. Liam is carefree and fun-loving, striking immediate accord with Leech but clashing with Eva and Sandie. His reckless and sometimes fickle attitude causes rifts in the gang. He eventually moves to Dublin.

== Episodes ==
=== Series overview ===
Series	Episodes	Originally released	
Series	Episodes	First released	Last released
1	6	21 February 2012	27 March 2012
2	6	3 September 2013	8 October 2013
3	6	25 March 2015	29 April 2015

=== Series 1 (2012) ===
No. overall	No. in series	Title	Directed by	Written by	Original release date
1	1	Series 1, episode 1	Terry Loane	Michael Shannon	21 February 2012
Jess arrives in Belfast for her first semester at University and is taken on a wild night out with her new housemates.
2	2	Series 1, episode 2	Terry Loane	Aaron Archer	28 February 2012
When Conor and Sandie's laptops are stolen, the friends embark on a risky mission to retrieve them. Danny's feelings develop for Jess but his mum's unexpected arrival makes life awkward. Eva introduces Justin to the gang.
3	3	Series 1, episode 3	Paul Riordan	Michael Shannon & Eoin Cleland	6 March 2012
Danny makes a difficult decision when his mum's alcoholism gets out of hand. The gang take a mystery bus tour but when Justin tags along, he threatens to expose Conor's secret.
4	4	Series 1, episode 4	Paul Riordan	Bronágh Taggart	13 March 2012
Eva tries to take Danny's mind off his troubles with a night on the town. Sandie experiences the backlash of social media when a compromising picture finds its way online. Jess is upset when she sees McCann's true colours.
5	5	Series 1, episode 5	Paul Riordan	Bronágh Taggart	20 March 2012
It is Halloween and the gang have a party but Leech succumbs to peer pressure from McCann, affecting his relationship with Carly. Sandie admits to knowing Conor's secret after Justin makes an appearance at the party. Eva and Danny grow closer.
6	6	Series 1, episode 6	Paul Riordan	Bronágh Taggart	27 March 2012
Leech makes an effort to win back Carly while Conor makes a big decision about Justin. An upset Eva turns on Jess and Danny.

=== Series 2 (2013) ===
No. overall	No. in series	Title	Directed by	Written by	Original release date
7	1	Series 2, episode 1	Paul Riordan & Diarmuid Goggins	Bronagh Taggart	3 September 2013
It's the second year of college and the gang have found new accommodation. Leech decides to throw a housewarming party but with disastrous consequences and Conor's secret is finally revealed.
8	2	Series 2, episode 2	Paul Riordan & Diarmuid Goggins	Daragh Carville	10 September 2013
Danny's latest film project requires a little assistance from his friends and Jess coaxes Eva into helping out. Conor confronts his teammates.
9	3	Series 2, episode 3	Andrea Harkin	Michael Shannon	17 September 2013
Eva finds out about Jess and McCann after an unexpected encounter. Conor deals with the consequences of coming out to his teammates.
10	4	Series 2, episode 4	Paul Riordan & Diarmuid Goggins	Eoin Cleland	24 September 2013
The gang decide to take a road trip for a musical festival but things don't go quite according to plan. Leech discovers a video of him online has gone viral.
11	5	Series 2, episode 5	Diarmuid Goggins	Bronagh Taggart	1 October 2013
Jess receives an unexpected offer from McCann. The friends throw a birthday party for Leech but he is shocked when his archenemy Gary makes an appearance.
12	6	Series 2, episode 6	Paul Riordan & Diarmuid Goggins	Michael Shannon	8 October 2013
When the friends receive an eviction notice, Sandie is upset that no one seems keen on living together any more. Conor decides to confront Gary after his behaviour towards Leech and Jess makes a big decision regarding her future.

=== Series 3 (2015) ===
No. overall	No. in series	Title	Directed by	Written by	Original release date
13	1	Series 3, episode 1	Declan Recks	Bronágh Taggart	25 March 2015
It's the final semester at Uni and the friends are preparing for big changes. Jess is working in Australia while Danny has accepted a job offer in London. Eva struggles to find experience as a solicitor while Sandie receives bad news about her family-run business. An unexpected death rocks Leech's world and new boy Liam causes mischief, with an eye for Conor. Carly moves into the student house.
14	2	Series 3, episode 2	Declan Recks	Daragh Carville	1 April 2015
Sandie is forced to get a job at Rockin' Rolls, with Carly, but her finances take another blow. Eva is reprimanded by her boss on her first day at work and Leech goes on a drunken rampage after Carly's revelation. Conor is shocked when Justin returns to town, resulting in a row about their relationship, while Liam causes tension.
15	3	Series 3, episode 3	Declan Recks	Daniel Cullen	8 April 2015
Eva volunteers for a task at work that leads to unexpected developments with her boss. Carly and Sandie invite Leech out for a karaoke night where Ryan Donaghy was there as a featured extra on it but events turn sour when Conor and Liam get into trouble at Rockin' Rolls and call for help.
16	4	Series 3, episode 4	Andrea Harkin	Susie Farrell & Daragh Carville	15 April 2015
Leech's plan to romance Carly is almost thwarted by Liam's antics. The girls decide to help Sandie collect her old things from the family home but end up having a confrontation with her father. Gordy reveals his true feelings at work and Conor is torn over his studies and future.
17	5	Series 3, episode 5	Declan Recks	Vanessa Pope	22 April 2015
Conor takes the unexpected blame for Liam selling drugs and Marty's intervention causes a rift with Eva. Gordy drives a wedge between Carly and Sandie and Leech has a big decision to make.
18	6	Series 3, episode 6	Declan Recks	Bronagh Taggart	29 April 2015
It's the end of an era, as the gang prepare to sit their finals. Leech makes one last attempt to win back Carly while Liam and Conor decide to move on. Things come to a head between Eva and Marty and Danny and Jess make a surprise return to Belfast. The series concludes one year later, with the gang heading to Cork, for a reunion with Conor, before he leaves for New York.

== Reception ==
Christine Keighery, of the Crossmaglen Examiner, praised the show for its local talent - "Written by, filmed in and starring actors from the North, the series is being hailed as a, long overdue, return to home-grown drama." However, Lee Henry, writing for Culture Northern Ireland criticised the series during its first season, in comparison to long-running British soap opera Hollyoaks, for aiming a teen drama at an adult audience. Likewise, the News Letter drew comparisons with Hollyoaks but also commended the local talent, describing it as "...exciting because it’s a Northern Irish drama - a rare and therefore precious offering."

By the third series, Joe Nawaz, writing in the Belfast Telegraph, generally praised the series as smart and youthful, but criticised some of the dialogue and the attempt to "re-imagine Belfast as a kind of fantasy cosmopolitan postcard destination."
