= Tobias Beer =

British actor

Tobias Beer is an English and Irish screenwriter and actor.

== Early life ==
Born in Cambridge, he studied at Oxford University and the Webber Douglas Academy of Dramatic Art. While at Oxford University, he won a blue in rugby union, scoring 11 points in their 1999 16–13 victory over Cambridge University in The Varsity Match.

== Acting ==
He has worked predominantly in the theatre, and his credits include: Great Expectations, Merry Wives of Windsor (with Judi Dench, Simon Callow and Alistair McGowan), Twelfth Night and The Comedy of Errors (all for the Royal Shakespeare Company); The Changeling for Cheek by Jowl, directed by Declan Donnellan; Cymbeline, Twelfth Night, Macbeth and A Midsummer Night's Dream for the Open Air Theatre, Regent's Park In 2015, he returned to the RSC in Death of a Salesman.

== Writing ==
In 2019, he co-created, wrote and executive produced the television drama The Deceived for Channel 5, Virgin Media Ireland and Netflix, with his wife Lisa McGee.

== Personal life ==
He is married to the writer Lisa McGee, who created the sitcom Derry Girls.
