= Ben Peel =

Northern Irish actor

- Occupation: Actor
- Years active: 2007–present

Ben Peel (born 1983/1984) is a Northern Irish actor best known for his role in the television crime drama The Fall (2013–2014) and the video game adaptation of William Adams in Nioh (2017) and Nioh 2 (2020).

== Early and personal life ==
Peel grew up in Belfast but now lives in North Yorkshire with his wife and two children. He trained at the Royal Central School of Speech and Drama.

== Filmography ==
=== Film ===
Year	Title	Role	Notes
2008	Hunger	Riot Prison Officer Stephen Graves	
2011	United	Harry Gregg	
2014	'71	RUC Officer	
2014	Vampire Academy	Spiridion	
2015	Anti-Social	Baxter	
2017	War Machine	Bernie Coot	
2018	Jurassic World: Fallen Kingdom	Helicopter Merc	
2018	Perfect Skin	Customer in tattoo studio	

=== Television ===
Year	Title	Role	Notes
2007	Inspector Lewis	Student	Episode: "Expiation"
2009	Spooks	MI5 Officer	Episode #8.8
2010	Doctors	Tony Howard	11 episodes
2012–2015	6Degrees	Justin Pollock	9 episodes
2013–2014	The Fall	DS James Olson	5 episodes
2015	Holby City	Tom O'Riordan	2 episodes
2015	Suspects	Harry Webster	Episode: "The Artist"
2016	Class	Coach Tom Dawson	2 episodes
2017	Level Up Norge	William Adams (voice)	2 episodes
2020	Alex Rider	Fox	3 episodes
2020	Cursed	Red Paladin at the Gates	Episode: "Cursed"
2021	Angela Black	Police Officer	Episode #1.3
2023	Secret Invasion	Brogan	2 episodes

=== Video games ===
Year	Title	Role	Notes
2017	Nioh	William Adams (voice)	
2017	Star Wars Battlefront II	Voice Talent	
2017	Warriors All-Stars	William Adams (voice)	
2018	Vampyr	McCullum / Newton / Preacher / Shepherd Jeremy (voices)	
2020	Nioh 2	William Adams (voice)	
TBA	Squadron 42	Michael Alstead	
