= St Cecilia's College =

Coordinates: 55.009°N 7.327°W

St Cecilia’s College

Location
- Bligh's Lane; Derry, County Londonderry, BT48 9PJ; Northern Ireland

Information
- Principal: Fiona Harrigan-Stewart
- Website: stceciliascollege.com

St Cecilia's College is a secondary school located in Derry, Northern Ireland. It is a Catholic-maintained girls' school with an enrolment of 947 pupils aged 11–18 and is located in the Creggan area of Derry. It has 60 teaching staff. The college decanted to the Northland Road to facilitate the construction of a new building which opened for the start of term in September 2010. It was within the former Western Education and Library Board area.

In March 2001 a programme for the extension and refurbishment of the college was announced under public-private partnership arrangements. In March 2006 it was announced that the College would be granted specialist arts college status from September 2006.

St Cecilia's College new campus was built on the site of the original college on Bligh's Lane, Creggan. St Cecilia's new sports pavilion and playing fields were built on the grounds of St Mary's old site in Creggan.

== Notable staff ==
- Mary Dillon (born 1964) - singer
- Martine Mulhern - Principal 2012-2022

== Notable pupils ==
- Martina Anderson (born 1962), Sinn Féin politician
- Eileen O'Donnell (born 1993), model and beauty pageant titleholder
- Saoirse-Monica Jackson (born 1993), actress
- Jamie-Lee O'Donnell, actress
