= Jamie-Lee O'Donnell =

Actress from Northern Ireland

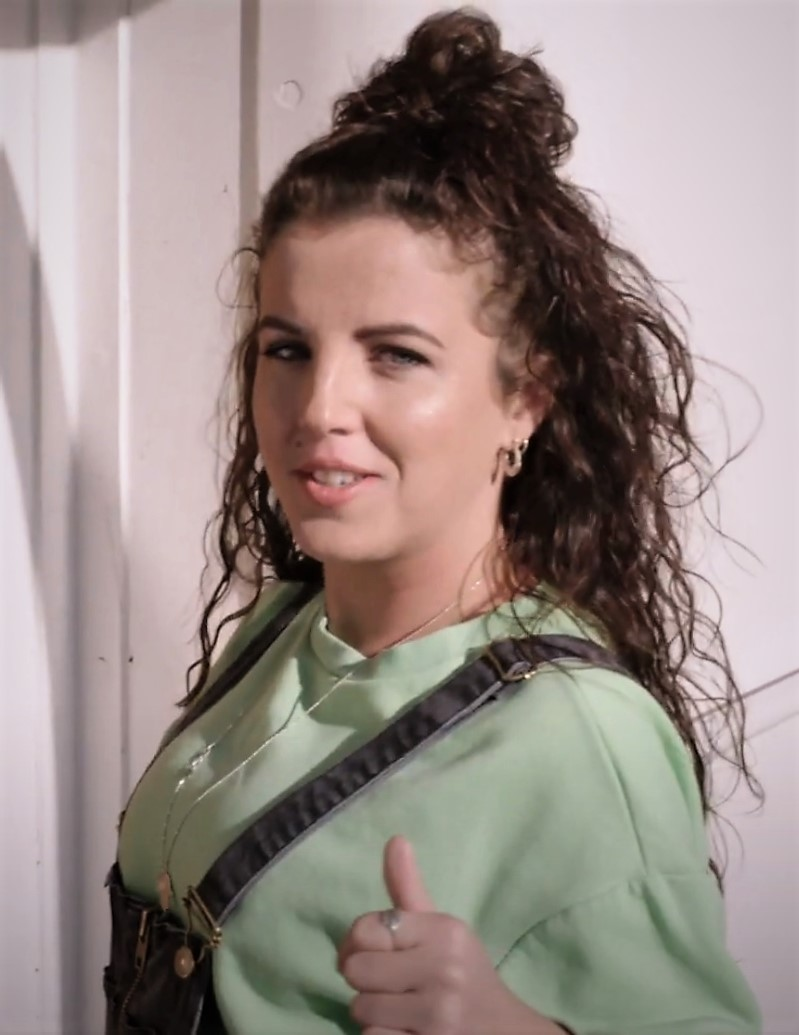
- O'Donnell appears for the National Lottery in 2019
- Born: Derry, Northern Ireland
- Education: St Anne's Primary School; St Cecilia's College; North West Regional College
- Alma mater: De Montfort University
- Occupation: Actress
- Years active: 2012–present
- Known for: 6Degrees, Derry Girls, Screw

Jamie-Lee O'Donnell is an actress from Northern Ireland. She is best known for playing Michelle Mallon in the Channel 4 sitcom Derry Girls.

== Early life ==
O’Donnell was born in Derry, Northern Ireland. She attended St Anne's Primary School, St Cecilia's College, and North West Regional College.

She began acting at a young age in school plays. Upon graduation, she decided to pursue it professionally despite not being able to afford drama school. She instead studied performing arts at the De Montfort University campus in Bedfordshire, but did not complete the course. She began auditioning and dividing her time between England and home, taking part in theatrical productions and working as a dancer for promotions and pantomimes. She moved around in search of employment, also working as a barista and at one point taking on a corner shop, which failed as a business.

== Career ==
Between 2012 and 2015, O'Donnell played her first significant role as Eva Maguire, one of the main characters of the BBC2 NI series 6Degrees, after the end of which she took part in the film Urban & the Shed Crew, by Candida Brady.

In 2018, she starred in a theatre production I Told My Mum I Was Going on an RE Trip, by Julia Samuels, playing an underage girl who decides to undergo an abortion. The following year, she joined the cast of Girls and Dolls, a play by the Derry Girls creator Lisa McGee, and acted in Martin McDonagh's The Cripple of Inishmaan at the Gaiety Theatre.

O'Donnell landed the role of Michelle Mallon in Derry Girls, a sitcom by Channel 4, which gained international fame. Of her role as Michelle, she says, "Michelle really thinks she's maybe just a bit too big for the place she was born in and she's ready to take on the world one swearword at a time. She's really feisty, really ballsy, doesn't really care about authority, just sort of up for anything and up for a laugh."

O'Donnell and her fellow Derry Girls co-stars participated in the RTÉ fundraising special RTÉ Does Comic Relief, performing a sketch alongside Saoirse Ronan. All proceeds from the night went towards those affected by the COVID-19 pandemic.

She is a patron of the Liverpool-based youth theatre company 20 Stories High.

== Filmography ==
=== Film ===
Year	Title	Role	Notes
2015	Urban & the Shed Crew	Reporter	Short film
2017	A Secret Journey	Mickey	Online short film
2018	Doing Money	Fiona	TV movie
2020	The Fruit Fix	Hope	Online short film
2022	Redeeming Love	Lucky	
2022	The Real Derry: Jamie-Lee O'Donnell	Herself	Documentary
2022	I Told My Mum I Was Going On An RE Trip		Online short film
2023	Unwelcome	Aisling	Movie
TBA	Girl Group	TBA	Movie

=== Television ===
Year	Title	Role	Notes
2012–2015	6Degrees	Eva Maguire	18 episodes
2018–2022	Derry Girls	Michelle Mallon	Lead role
2022–2023	Screw	Rose Gill	Channel 4 drama; lead role
2023	World's Most Dangerous Roads	Herself (with Saoirse-Monica Jackson)	Travel Documentary
2025	The Feud	PC Gallagher	6 episodes
2025	Leonard and Hungry Paul	Shelley	6 episodes
2025	Faithless	Chloe	5 episodes (series 2)
2025	RuPaul's Drag Race UK	Guest judge	Series 7
TBA	Hopley Hall (w/t)	TBA	Upcoming six-part comedy

=== Music videos ===
Year	Title	Artist	Role	Notes
2025	"Sayōnara"	Kneecap and Paul Hartnoll		
