= Dearbhla Molloy =

Irish film, stage and television actress (born 1946)

- Born: 1946 (age 78–79); Dublin, Ireland
- Occupation: Actress
- Years active: 1970–present
- Children: 1

Dearbhla Molloy (/ˈdɜːrvlə/; born 1946) is an Irish actress.

== Early life ==
Molloy was born to John Molloy and Evelyn Ryan and grew up on Yellow Walls Road in Malahide, County Dublin, Ireland, the eldest of seven children. She attended an Irish-language school and finished her Leaving Certificate exams at the age of 16. As she was too young for university, she took a drama course at the Brendan Smith Academy before being accepted by the Abbey Theatre when she was 18.

== Career ==
Molloy consolidated her stage reputation at both the Abbey and Gate theatres in Dublin, then she toured with an Abbey production to Britain. She was invited to join the Royal Shakespeare Company in Stratford-upon-Avon in England, and has played Gertrude to Kenneth Branagh's Hamlet in the West End in London.

In 1991, she was in the company that performed Brian Friel's Dancing at Lughnasa, on Broadway in New York City, about the sad lives of a group of sisters in pre-war rural Ireland. She was nominated for a Tony Award but lost to her co-star, Bríd Brennan. She has appeared in such television plays and series, as Michael Palin's wife in GBH and in New Tricks, Midsomer Murders, and Sex, the City and Me. and The Bill

Among her theatrical credits are: Doubt: A Parable (Tricycle Theatre); In Celebration (Duke of York's Theatre); Dancing at Lughnasa, Juno and the Paycock, A Touch of the Poet (on Broadway); Juno and the Paycock (Donmar Warehouse); The Cripple of Inishmaan, On the Ledge, Hinterland (National Theatre); Arcadia (Haymarket); The Life of the World to Come (Almeida); The Hostage (Royal Shakespeare Company); and The Plough and the Stars (Young Vic).

She has appeared extensively in the plays of Irish playwright Brian Friel. On television, she has appeared in Waking the Dead, Foyle's War, Killer, Midsomer Murders, New Tricks, and the 1960s RTÉ drama series, Tolka Row.

In 2009, she joined the cast of the British television drama series Coronation Street as the mother of Michelle Connor (Kym Marsh). She reprised her role for two episodes in 2015.

Her film credits include Tara Road, The Blackwater Lightship and This Is the Sea. In April 2017 she appeared in The Ferryman at the Royal Court Theatre in London, ahead of a transfer to the Gielgud Theatre, also in London. Her performance earned her an Olivier Award nomination as Best Supporting Actress.

== Personal life ==
Molloy married Bobby Carlisle at 21 years old, with whom she had a son Rory. They separated after five years and pursued a divorce in England and an annulment in Ireland. She later married Brian de Salvo and divorced him in 1995.
