= Lisa McGee =

Screenwriter and playwright from Northern Ireland (born 1980)

- Born: Elizabeth McGee; August 1980 (age 46); Derry, Northern Ireland
- Education: Thornhill College
- Alma mater: Queen's University Belfast
- Occupations: Screenwriter, playwright
- Known for: Derry Girls
- Spouse: Tobias Beer (m. 2015)
- Children: 2

Elizabeth "Lisa" McGee (born August 1980) is an Irish playwright and screenwriter. McGee is the creator and writer of Derry Girls, a hit comedy series that began airing on Channel 4 in the UK and Ireland in January 2018. In 2018, she was listed as one of BBC's 100 Women and was elected a Fellow of the Royal Society of Literature in 2022.

== Early life and education ==
McGee was born in Derry, Northern Ireland, to Irish Catholic parents, Anne McGee, who worked in a shop, and Chris McGee, a lorry driver. She has a younger sister, Joleen.

McGee attended Thornhill College and studied drama at Queen's University Belfast.

== Career ==
While studying at Queen's, she wrote Jump, a dark comedy play set in Derry, which was later adapted into a film. She gained an attachment to the Royal National Theatre in London in 2006. In addition to Jump, McGee's other plays include The Heights, Nineteen Ninety Two, and Girls and Dolls. For Girls and Dolls she won the Stewart Parker Trust New Playwright Bursary 2007.

McGee created and wrote the Irish television series Raw (2008-2013) for RTÉ. This was followed by a sitcom London Irish (2013), for Channel 4.

She also wrote for The Things I Haven't Told You for BBC Three and the BAFTA-nominated Being Human for the BBC. Further writing credits include episodes for Golden Globe-nominated drama series The White Queen for BBC 1, Indian Summers for Channel 4, and The Deceived for Channel 5 co-written with her husband Tobias Beer.

McGee is best known as the creator and writer of Derry Girls (2018–2022), a comedy series about five teenagers growing up in the 1990s during The Troubles. The series was critically acclaimed.

In Summer 2023, Channel 4 green lit McGee's How to Get to Heaven from Belfast, which began filming in 2024. The series was then released on Netflix in February 2026.

== Awards and recognition ==
In December 2022, McGee received the Freedom of the City of Derry.

In 2023, she was the winner of the British Academy Television Craft Awards.

In 2024, she was awarded the Christopher Ewart-Biggs Memorial Prize. The prize honours work promoting peace and reconciliation.

== Personal life ==
McGee married actor Tobias Beer in 2015. They live in Belfast with their two sons.

== Filmography ==
Year	Title	Network	Notes
2006	Totally Frank	Channel 4	Writer
2007	The Meeting		Writer
2008-2013	Raw	RTE	Co-creator, writer
2008-2013	Being Human	BBC Three	Writer
2008	The Things I Haven't Told You	BBC Three	Writer
2013	London Irish	Channel 4	Creator, writer, associate producer
2013	The White Queen	BBC One	Writer
2015-2016	Indian Summers	Channel 4	Writer
2018-2022	Derry Girls	Channel 4, Netflix	Creator, writer, executive producer, producer, showrunner
2020	The Deceived	Channel 5	Co-creator, writer
2022	Skint	BBC Four	Writer
2025	Spinster		Executive producer
2026	How to Get to Heaven from Belfast	Netflix	Creator, writer
Pre-production	Wildwood	FX, 20th Television	Creator, executive producer, writer
