= National Film and Television School =

Film school in Buckinghamshire, England

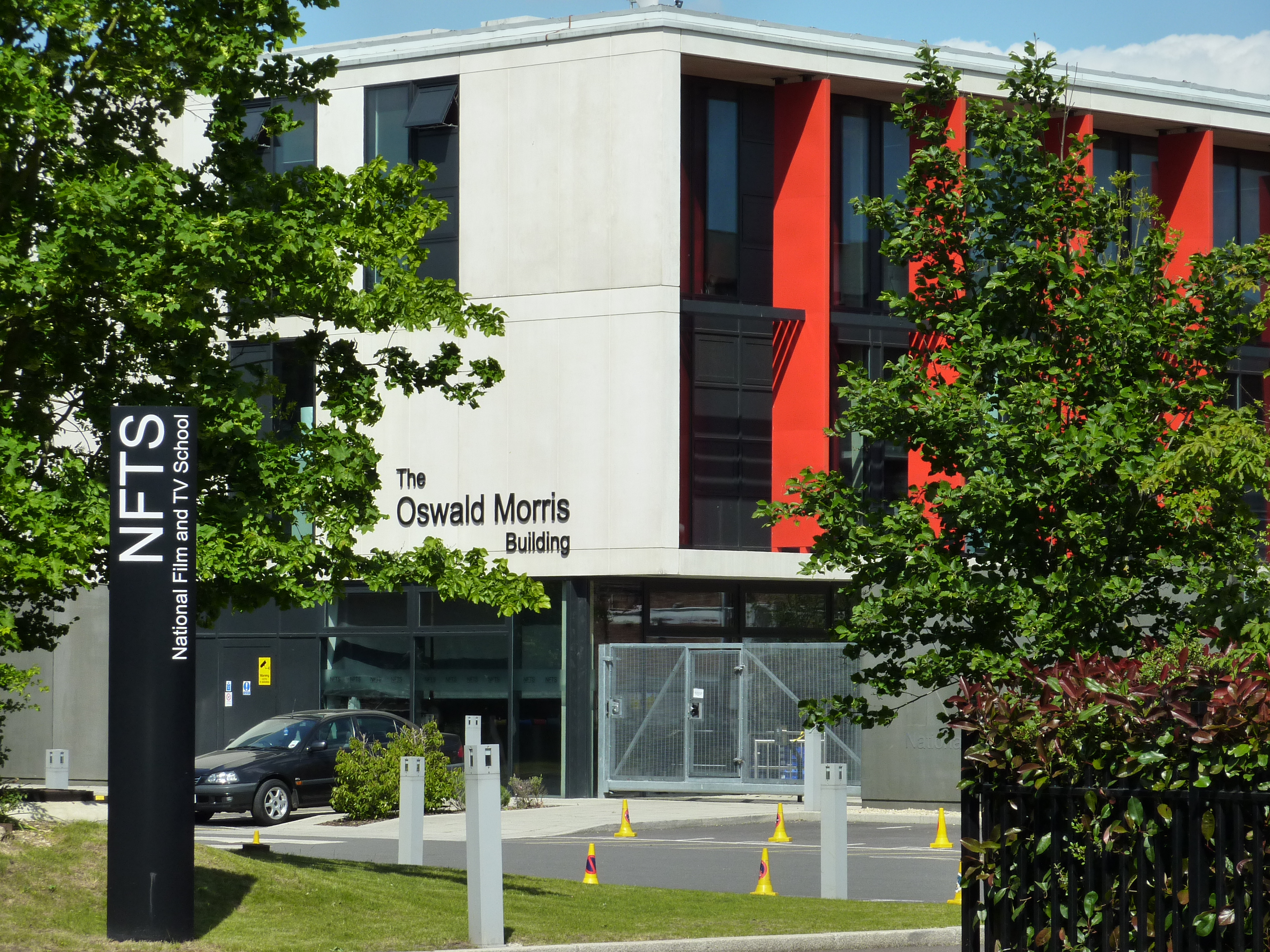
- NFTS in 2011
- Motto: Our Credits Tell The Story
- Type: Educational Charity
- Established: 1971; 55 years ago
- Academic affiliations: CILECT
- President: Lord Puttnam
- Director: Jon Wardle
- Postgraduates: 500
- Other students: 100
- Location: Beaconsfield, Buckinghamshire, England; 51.6054°N 0.6374°W
- Campus: Beaconsfield Film Studios
- Website: nfts.co.uk

The National Film and Television School (NFTS) is a film, television and games school established in 1971 and based at Beaconsfield Studios in Beaconsfield, Buckinghamshire, England. It has been named in The Hollywood Reporter's annual list of the best international film schools for 16 consecutive years, most recently in 2026. Its alumni have received more than 60 Academy Award nominations and over 100 BAFTA Awards, and in 2018 the school received the BAFTA for Outstanding British Contribution to Cinema.

As of 2026 it had over 500 students and about fifteen hundred a year on its short courses delivered in Beaconsfield and at its hubs in Glasgow, Leeds, and Cardiff. Beaconsfield Studios consists of film and television stages, animation, and production design studios, edit suites, sound post-production facilities, a music recording studio, and four dubbing theaters. The school completed an expansion in early 2017, adding a third cinema and a Television Studio.

The BBC stated that the NFTS was the "leading centre of excellence for education in film and television programme making", and noted that it was "relevant to the industry's present and future needs". British Film Magazine once described the NFTS as being one of the few schools to come "very, very close" to guaranteeing a job in the film industry, and named its leader (Powell) a "maverick". Filmmaking.net named it one of two films schools outside the U.S. which had such a high international reputation.

NFTS student films have been nominated for an Oscar three times in the last six years. Additionally, in 2017 NFTS graduation film, A Love Story, directed and co-written by Anushka Naanayakkara, won the British Short Animation BAFTA at the EE British Academy Film Awards, making it the fourth year in a row that NFTS students have picked up this accolade. This is the second consecutive year that two of NFTS students' graduation films competed for the same prize, with A Love Story up against The Alan Dimension directed and co-written by Jac Clinch. NFTS student films are regularly selected for the top film festivals around the world. In 2016–17 highlights included selections at Cannes and Annecy Animation Festival and top prizes in nearly all the Royal Television Society categories for which they were eligible.

In 2018, the school was the recipient of the BAFTA Outstanding British Contribution to Cinema Award at the 71st British Academy Film Awards.

== History ==
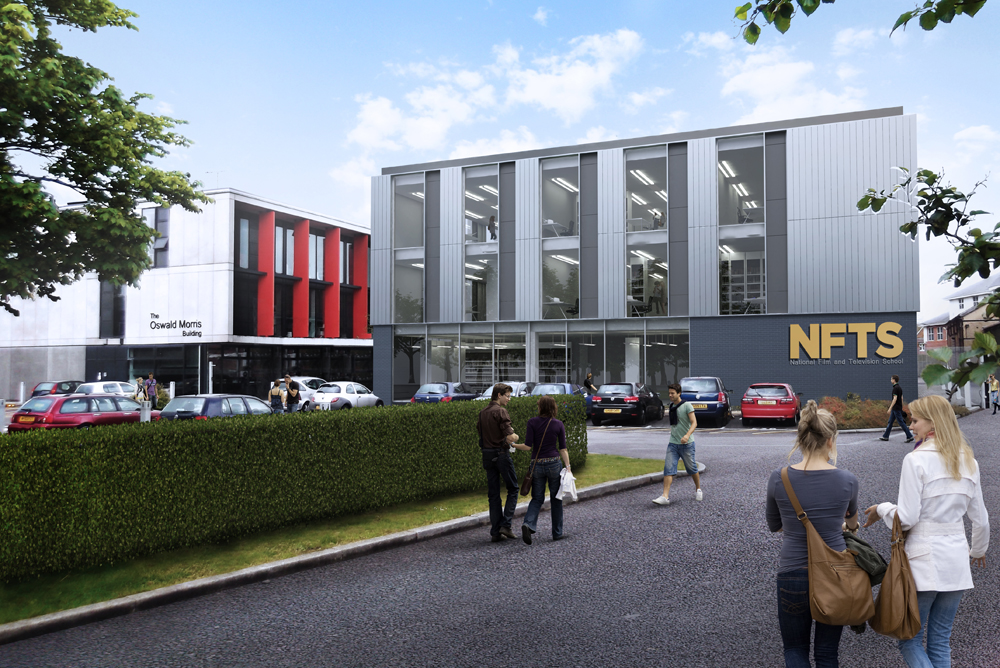
One of the new NFTS buildings to be opened in 2017 (artist's impression).

The National Film School opened in 1971, the work of four years of planning to create an institution to train personnel for the British film industry. The Department of Education and Science had in 1967 recommended the creation of a national film school for the UK, and in 1969 an inquiry led by Lord Lloyd of Hampstead began to develop plans. Colin Young CBE became the founding director in 1971, a post he held for more than 2 decades, at a time when the school produced alumni including Bill Forsyth, Terence Davies, Julien Temple, Beeban Kidron, and Nick Park.

In 2016, the NFTS announced it had received funding to increase the capacity of its site in Beaconsfield including a '4K Digital Content Production Training Studio' (a refit of the 1960s TV studio) and the addition of a number of new MA and diploma courses including Directing & Producing Natural History & Science; Production Technology; Marketing for Film, TV & Games; Graphics & Titles for Television & Film and Creative Business for Entrepreneurs & Executives. In April 2017, it was announced that Nik Powell was to step down as Director of the school, with Jon Wardle succeeding him in the role.

The NFTS holds yearly graduation shows at the Picturehouse Central in Soho, and they were previously held at the BFI Southbank (formerly known as the National Film Theatre). These are invite-only events which showcase the students' projects to scouts and industry professionals, ensuring that the students receive utmost exposure.

== Awards and nominations ==
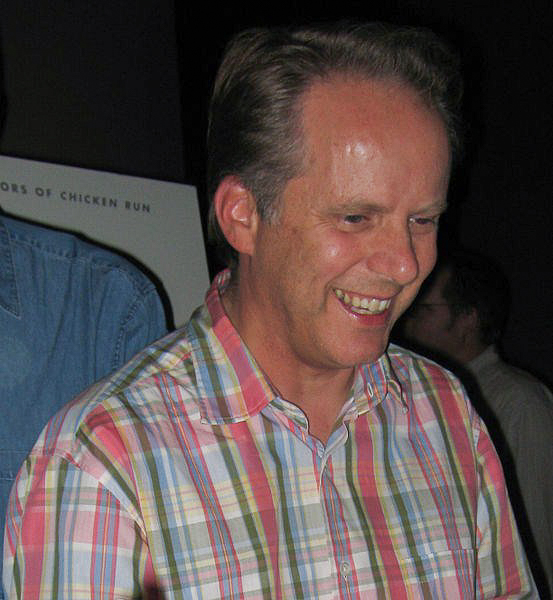
Alumnus Nick Park has gone on to win four Oscars.

Alumni of the National Film and Television School have gone on to win Oscars, BAFTAs and Emmys as well as film festival prizes from around the world. In the last 6 years student films The Confession (2011), Head Over Heels (2013), The Bigger Picture (2015) have gone on to be nominated for three Oscars, and the graduation film A Love Story won the 2017 BAFTA for Best Short Animation, the fourth year in a row an NFTS animation has won the category.

In 2013, the NFTS graduation film "Miss Todd" won the Student Academy Award for Best Foreign Film presented by Academy of Motion Picture Arts and Sciences. This marked for the sixth time the NFTS had won in this category, more than any other Film School outside of the United States of America. In 2016, The National Film and Television School affirmed its place as the number one international film school by winning accolades in all three categories in the CILECT Prize, the global film school awards. The NFTS won "Best Documentary" for The Archipelago, "Best Animation" for Edmond and was awarded second prize in the "Fiction" category for Patriot. At the 77th British Academy Film Awards in 2024, two NFTS graduation films won BAFTAs: Jellyfish and Lobster, directed by Yasmin Afifi, won Best British Short Film, and Crab Day, directed by Ross Stringer, won Best British Short Animation. The following year, the school won Best British Short Film again with Rock, Paper, Scissors, at the 78th British Academy Film Awards, giving the NFTS back-to-back wins in the category.

== Facilities ==
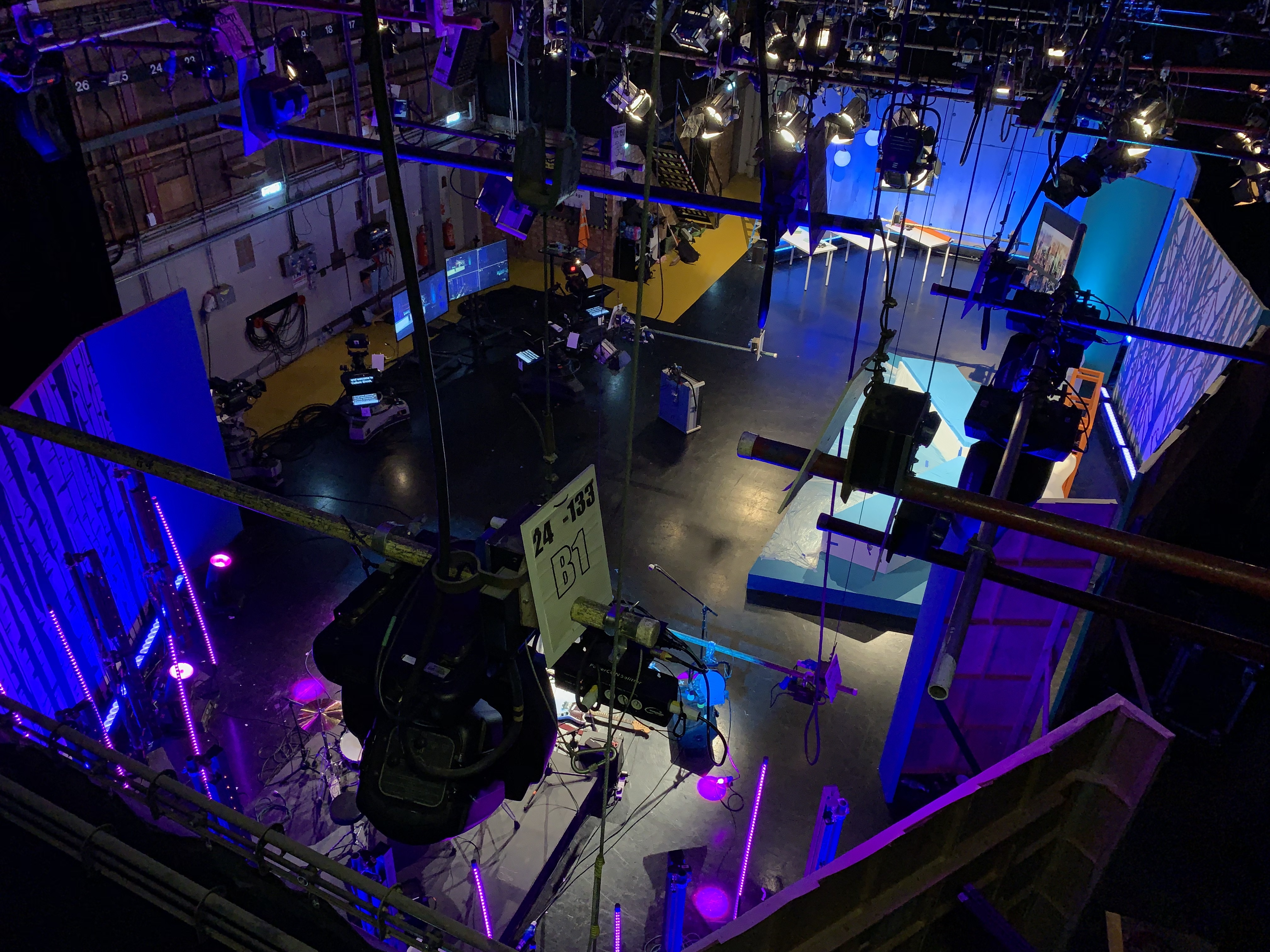
A TV show being rehearsed in the TV Studio

The school's facilities were expanded in 2008 with the addition of new teaching spaces, public spaces and a new cinema, designed by Glenn Howells Architects. Upon its completion in 2008, the strikingly modern three-story building (see photo above) won a coveted RIBA prize. In June 2009, it was formally named The Oswald Morris Building in honour of veteran cinematographer Ossie Morris.

Two new buildings and one refurbished building opened in January 2017. This included the refurbishment of the 4K Digital Content Production Training Studio, located in the original 1960s TV studio which was completely refurbished with state-of-the-art equipment. In July 2017, this building was named the "Sky Studios at the NFTS" building, with the Production Galleries named "The Sony Gallery". This studio is primarily used by the Camera, Sound & Vision Mixing for Television Production diploma course and the Directing and Producing Television Entertainment MA course.

Inside the "Channel 4 Rose Building", there are new facilities for the Games Design & Development and Digital Effects MA courses, as well as an extra cinema, café and incubation space to enable graduates to start new businesses and accommodate new ground-breaking courses, enhancing the NFTS's already diverse programme.

A new teaching block on the north of the site houses a new studio, edit suites, dedicated suites for the Sound Design MA and Graphics and Titles for Film and Television diploma courses, as well as multi-purpose teaching spaces.

There are four dedicated stages on site:

- Stage 1 (Main Stage) – 7,000 square feet (650 m^{2}) (approx.) – traditional wooden floor film stage with permanent scenic cloth
- Studio 2 (TV Studio) – 3,600 square feet (330 m^{2}) (approx.) – concrete resin floor television studio
- Stage 3 (Rehearsal Stage) – 1,050 square feet (98 m^{2}) (approx.) – traditional wooden floor film stage
- Stage 4 (Teaching Block Stage) – 900 square feet (84 m^{2}) (approx.) – resin floor multi-purpose stage

There are also a number of dedicated spaces for animation and music recording.

== Funding ==
Until its repeal in 1986, the school was funded partly through a tax on cinema ticket sales known as the Eady Levy, named after then UK Treasury official Sir Wilfred Eady. The NFTS has since been funded by the UK Government, via (today) the Department for Culture, Media and Sport, and the television and film industries.

Key Partner Sponsors include the Film Distributors' Association and the UK Cinema Association in addition to the main UK terrestrial and satellite broadcasting companies BBC, Channel 4, Sky, and ITV. In addition, a large number of public and private donors fund scholarships to assist British students.

Postgraduate students from the UK can now apply for a loan to help with their studies at any UK university including the NFTS via the Student Loans Company.

== Courses of studies ==
=== Full-time MA courses ===
validated by the Royal College of Art:

- Cinematography
- Composing for Film and television
- Creative Business for Entrepreneurs and Executives
- Digital Effects
- Directing Animation
- Directing Documentary
- Directing Fiction
- Directing and Producing Science and Natural History
- Directing and Producing Television Entertainment
- Editing
- Film Studies, Programming and Curation
- Games Design and Development
- Marketing, Distribution, Sales and Exhibition
- Producing
- Production Design
- Production Technology
- Screenwriting
- Sound Design for Film and television

=== Diploma courses ===
- Assistant Directing and Floor Managing
- Assistant Camera (Focus Pulling and Loading)
- Camera, Sound & Vision Mixing for Television Production
- Creative Digital Producing
- Directing Commercials and Promos
- Factual Development and Production
- Graphics and Titles for Film and television
- Model Making for Animation
- Production Accounting
- Production Management for Film and television
- Location Sound Recording for Film and Television
- Script Development
- Sports Production
- Writing and Producing Comedy

=== Certificate courses ===
- Filmmaking
- Character Animation
- Virtual Production
- Casting
- Producing Your First Feature
- Script Supervision and Continuity
- Screenwriting: Finding Your Voice
- Location Management for Film & TV

=== Short courses ===
Shortcourses@NFTS regularly run short courses for professionals working in the film and television industries – covering the following areas:

- Factual
- Drama
- Business Skills
- Camera & Sound
- Editing
- Craft & Technical
- Multiplatform

== Members ==
The school has around 110 full-time staff along with several top tutors from within the industry.

=== Board ===
- President: Lord Puttnam
- Chairman: Patrick McKenna
- Director: Jon Wardle
- Governors:
  - Professor Geoffrey Crossick, University of London
  - Patrick Fueller
  - Sara Geater, All3Media
  - Caroline Hollick, Channel 4
  - Oli Hyatt, Blue-Zoo Productions
  - Ian Lewis, Sky Cinema
  - Andrew McDonald, DNA Films
  - Steve Mertz, Warner Bros.
  - Pukar Mehta, ITV Studios
  - Adil Ray
  - Laurent Samara, Google, UK
  - Bal Samra
  - Rose Garnatt, BBC
  - Sue Vertue, Hartswood Films
  - Joe Bradbury-Walters, NFTS Staff governor

=== Partners ===
- Platinum Partner Sponsor
  - Channel 4
- Key Partner Sponsors
  - British Broadcasting Corporation
  - Film Distributors' Association
  - ITV
  - Sky
- Key Partner Funders
  - Department for Culture, Media and Sport
  - HEFCE

=== Key tutors ===
- Alex Garland – Associate Director
- Brian Gilbert – Co-Head of Fiction
- Lesley Manning – Co-Head of Fiction
- Ian Sellar – Co-Head of Fiction
- Peter Dale – Head of Documentary
- Robert Bradbrook – Head of Animation
- Brian Ward – Head of Screenwriting
- Stuart Harris – Co-Head of Cinematography
- Oliver Stapleton – Co-Head of Cinematography
- Sandra Hebron – Head of Screen Arts
- Bex Hopkins – Head of Production Management
- John Keane – Head of Composing
- John Lee – Head of Model Making
- John Rowe – Head of Digital Effects
- Andy Worboys – Head of Editing
- Alan Thorn – Head of Games Design and Development
- Chris Auty – Head of Producing
- Caroline Amies – Head of Production Design
- David G. Croft – Head of Television Entertainment
- Simon Clark – Head of Location Sound Recording
- Chris Pow – Head of Sound Design
- John Rowe – Head of Digital Effects
- Clare Crean – Head of Marketing, Distribution, Sales and Exhibition
- Alan Thorn – Head of Games

=== Chairs ===
- Stephen Frears – David Lean Chair in Fiction Direction
- Simon Beaufoy – Visiting Chair in Screenwriting
- Brian Tufano – Visiting Chair in Cinematography

== Honorary Fellows ==
The National Film and Television School has named more than 30 honorary fellows. The programme was founded in 1981, and ceremonies take place at the NTFS graduation ceremony each year. Honorary Fellows are recognised for their "outstanding contribution to the British film and television industry".

=== Honorary Fellows ===
The following are the Fellows, as of March 2020, where alumni of the NTFS are indicated by an asterisk (*):

- Lord Attenborough, CBE
- Amma Asante
- Mark Baker
- Sir Peter Bazalgette
- Tim Bevan
- Malorie Blackman, OBE*
- Barbara Broccoli
- Sir Michael Caine, CBE
- Terence Davies*
- Sir Roger Deakins, CBE*
- Molly Dineen*
- Greg Dyke
- Eric Fellner
- Paul Greengrass
- Asif Kapadia
- Duncan H. Kenworthy, OBE
- Baroness Kidron, OBE*
- Michael Kuhn
- Sir David Lean, CBE
- Ken Loach
- Kim Longinotto*
- Ossie Morris, CBE
- Steve Morrison*
- Nick Park, CBE*
- Sir Alan Parker, CBE
- Ashley Pharoah*
- Lord Puttnam of Queensgate, CBE
- Michael Radford*
- Lynne Ramsay*
- Jonathan Ross
- Tessa Ross, CBE
- Jack Valenti
- Sally Wainwright
- David Yates*
- Colin Young

Other past fellow have included Lord Birkett, who died in April 2015.

== Notable alumni (selection) ==
=== Animation ===
- Nick Park (Chicken Run, Wallace and Gromit)
- Mark Baker (Peppa Pig, Ben and Holly's Little Kingdom)
- Alison Snowden and David Fine (Bob and Margaret, Bob's Birthday)
- Tony Collingwood, Collingwood O'Hare Ltd, (Dennis the Menace, Yoko! Jakamoko! Toto!)
- Joan Ashworth (The Web, How Mermaids Breed, Seedfold Films, 3 Peach Animation, Professor of Animation Royal College of Art 1994 to 2015)

=== Cinematography ===
- Roger Deakins (Jarhead, A Beautiful Mind, Fargo)
- David Tattersall (Die Another Day, Star Wars – Episodes I, II and III)
- Andrzej Sekuła (Pulp Fiction, American Psycho, Reservoir Dogs)
- Alwin H. Küchler (Code 46, The Mother, Ratcatcher, Morvern Callar)
- Eduard Grau (A Single Man, Buried, Suffragette, Boy Erased)
- Benjamin Kračun (Promising Young Woman, The Substance)

=== Directing (film) ===
- Mark Herman (Little Voice, Brassed Off)
- Michael Caton-Jones (Memphis Belle, This Boy's Life)
- Terence Davies (Distant Voices, Still Lives, The Neon Bible)
- Michael Radford (Il Postino, The Merchant of Venice)
- Lynne Ramsay (Ratcatcher, Morvern Callar)
- Julien Temple
- Joanna Hogg
- David Yates (Harry Potter)
- Beeban Kidron (Bridget Jones: The Edge of Reason, Hippie Hippie Shake)
- Anthony Waller (An American Werewolf in Paris, Mute Witness)
- Michael Lennox (A Patch of Fog, Boogaloo and Graham, Hives)
- Georgis Grigorakis (Digger)
- Joachim Trier
- Theja Rio (Angh)

=== Directing (television) ===
- Charles McDougall (Desperate Housewives, Queer As Folk, Hillsborough)
- Brian Welsh (Black Mirror, What It Feels Like for a Girl, The Escape Artist)
- David Yates (State of Play, Sex Traffic, The Girl in the Café)
- Toby Haynes (Doctor Who, Sherlock, Wallander)

=== Composing for film and television ===
- Adiescar Chase (Heartstopper)
- Natalie Ann Holt (Great Expectations, The Honourable Woman, Paddington)
- Trevor Jones (Richard III, Brassed Off)
- Julian Nott (Wallace & Gromit: The Curse of the Were-Rabbit, The Wrong Trousers, A Grand Day Out)
- Dario Marianelli (The Brothers Grimm, V for Vendetta, Pride and Prejudice, Atonement, Anna Karenina)

=== Documentary ===
- Nick Broomfield (Kurt and Courtney, Aileen: Life and Death of a Serial Killer)
- John Burgan (Memory of Berlin)
- Molly Dineen (Home from the Hill, Heart of the Angel, Geri, The Ark)
- Kim Longinotto (Divorce Iranian Style, The Day I Will Never Forget, Sisters in Law, Hold Me Tight Let Me Go) (Rough Aunties)
- Sean McAllister (The Minders, Settlers, The Liberace of Baghdad)
- Sandhya Suri (I for India)

=== Film editing ===
- Valerio Bonelli (Hannibal Rising, Cemetery Junction)
- Nicolas Chaudeurge (Red Road, Fish Tank, Wuthering Heights)
- Hoping Chen (Ilo Ilo)
- Bill Diver (Twenty Four Seven, Distant Voices, Still Lives)
- Nick Fenton (Nathan Barley, The Arbor, Submarine)
- David Freeman (The Full Monty, Clash of the Titans, Ill Manors)
- Daniel Greenway (Southcliffe, Call the Midwife)
- Peter Lambert (The Twilight Saga: New Moon)
- Helle le Fevre (Archipelago, Exhibition)
- Ewa J Lind (Far North, The Warrior)
- Alex Mackie (Downton Abbey, Judge Dredd, Wallander)
- Jamie McCoan (Doctor Who, Lewis, Kavanagh QC, Agatha Christie's Poirot, Goodnight Mister Tom)
- Úna Ní Dhonghaíle (Ripper Street, Vera, Doctor Who, Wallander, Quirke, Upstairs, Downstairs)
- Lucia Zucchetti (The Queen, Ratcatcher, The Merchant of Venice)

=== Producing ===
- Michele Camarda (Wonderland, This Year's Love, Photographing Fairies)
- Sebastian Cody (After Dark, The Secret Cabaret and other Open Media productions)
- Ben Lock (Purple and Brown, Tiny Planets)
- Rebekah Gilbertson (The Edge of Love, Patagonia)
- Steve Morrison (My Left Foot, The Field, Jack and Sarah, co-founder All3Media)

=== Screenwriting ===
- András Gerevich (Synchronoff)
- Ashley Pharoah (Life on Mars)
- Laurie Nunn (Sex Education)
- Krysty Wilson-Cairns (1917, Last Night in Soho)

== See also ==
- Glossary of motion picture terms
