= Home from the Hill =

Home from the Hill is a phrase from Robert Louis Stevenson's poem (and epitaph), Requiem, the last two lines of which read:

Home is the sailor, home from sea,
And the hunter home from the hill.

As a title, it may refer to:

- Home from the Hill (novel), the first novel by author William Humphrey, published in 1958
  - Home from the Hill (film), a 1960 film directed by Vincente Minnelli, based on the book
- Home from the Hill (Hook book), an autobiographical account of life in colonial Africa by Hilary Hook
  - Home from the Hill (documentary), a 1980s BBC documentary based on the book
- "Home from the Hill" is the title of an unreleased song from The Kingston Trio's album Sold Out
