= Michael Lennox =

Northern Irish film director

- Born: Michael Carson Lennox; County Antrim, Northern Ireland
- Education: National Film and Television School (M.A.)
- Occupations: Director, producer, cinematographer
- Years active: 2008–present

Michael Carson Lennox is a film and television director, cinematographer, and producer from Northern Ireland.

== Early life ==
Born and raised in County Antrim, Northern Ireland, Lennox was inspired by cinema from an early age and began to make plans for a career as a filmmaker.

== Career ==
In 2008, he made his first short film, called Rip and the Preacher. The film was shown at the Californian Cinequest Film Festival, the LA Shorts Fest and a lot of other film festivals around the world. In 2010 Lennox made his Television debut with a 30-minute drama, called Eclipse, starring Andrew Buchan. Eclipse was an episode for the 8th season of the British TV series Coming Up.

Lennox gained a place on the Master of Arts in Fiction directing-course at the National Film and Television School in Beaconsfield. His work at the university included the short film The Back of Beyond. It was screened as part of the BAFTA NFTS Stars of Tomorrow event and won the Royal Television Society Student Television Award in the Post Graduate Section. The film also won the Pianifica Award and the Junior Jury Award at the Locarno Film Festival in 2012 and was nominated for the European Film Award.

Furthermore, Lennox collaborated on the feature film Hives, which was selected for the San Sebastian Film Festival and was the result of a co-production project between five European film academies.

In 2014 Lennox returned to his home in Northern Ireland where he directed the short film Boogaloo and Graham, which had its world premiere at the Toronto International Film Festival. In 2015, Boogaloo and Graham won a BAFTA Award for Best British Short Film and was nominated for the Academy Award for Best Short Film, Live Action. Lennox's debut feature A Patch of Fog, starring Stephen Graham and Conleth Hill, was released in 2015.

In 2017, 2018, and 2021 Lennox directed all three series of the Channel 4 television sitcom Derry Girls.

== Filmography ==
=== Feature film ===
Year	Film	Functioned as			Notes
Year	Film	Director	Cinematographer	Producer	Notes
2009	Ditching	No	Yes	No	
2009	Dawkins vs Lennox: Has Science Buried God?	Yes	No	No	Documentary
2012	Hives	Yes	No	No	Segment: "London"
2015	A Patch of Fog	Yes	No	No	
2022	Love, Tom	Yes	No	Yes	Documentary

=== Short film ===
Year	Film	Functioned as		Notes
Year	Film	Director	Producer	Notes
2008	Rip and the Preacher	Yes	No	
2010	Dinner Party	Yes	No	
2011	Absence	Yes	Yes	
2012	Nine Lives	Yes	No	
2012	The Back of Beyond	Yes	Yes	
2014	Boogaloo and Graham	Yes	No	
2015	Awaydays	Yes	No	
2017	Guard	No	Executive	
2018	Here's Looking at You, Kid	Yes	No	
2024	One Last Touch	No	Executive	

=== Television ===
Year	Film	Functioned as			Notes
Year	Film	Director	Cinematographer	Executive producer	Notes
2010	Coming Up	Yes	No	No	Episode: "Eclipse"
2013	Queen Victoria and the Crippled Kaiser	No	Yes	No	Documentary
2014	The Man Who Shot the Great War	No	Yes	No	Documentary
2017	Endeavour	Yes	No	No	1 episode
2018–22	Derry Girls	Yes	No	No	19 episodes
2020	Love, Victor	Yes	No	No	1 episode
2024	Say Nothing	Yes	No	Yes	4 episodes
2026	How to Get to Heaven from Belfast	Yes	No	Yes	3 episodes
2026	Crystal Lake	Yes	No	Yes	3 episodes

== Awards and nominations ==
- 2012: Pianifica Award for The Back of Beyond at the Locarno International Film Festival
- 2012: Junior Jury Award for The Back of Beyond in the Leopards of Tomorrow - International Competition at the Locarno International Film Festival
- 2012: Nominated for the Golden Pardino - Leopards of Tomorrow for The Back of Beyond in the International Competition at the Locarno International Film Festival
- 2012: Nominated for the Best Short Film Award for The Back of Beyond at the European Film Awards
- 2013: Best “ExYU generation Next” award for Hives at the Skena Up Festival in Pristina
- 2015: Nominated for the IFTA Award in the category Best Short Filmfor Boogaloo and Graham at the Irish Film and Television Awards
- 2015: Nominated for the Crystal Bear in the category Generation Kplus - Best Short Film for Boogaloo and Graham at the Berlin International Film Festival
- 2015: BAFTA Award for Boogaloo and Graham in the category Best British Short Film at the British Academy Film Awards
- 2015: Nominated for the Oscar in the category Best Short Film, Live Action for Boogaloo and Graham at the US-American Academy Awards
