= Bronágh Taggart =

Northern Irish actor

- Born: Belfast, Northern Ireland
- Occupation: Actress
- Years active: 2004–present
- Spouse: Jonathan Harden (2008–present)

Bronágh Taggart is a Northern Irish actress and writer, born in Belfast.

She has appeared in BAFTA-winning Occupation, Best: His Mother's Son, and The Fall and has written for BBC Northern Ireland series 6Degrees since it first aired in 2012. In 2013, she wrote a half-hour film, Call it a Night, for broadcast on Channel 4 as part of the late-night Coming Up series.

In 2017, Taggart wrote, produced and starred in Guard, a female-led boxing film directed by Jonathan Harden. It had its debut at the Oscar-qualifying Galway Film Fleadh in July 2017, and soon after its North American premiere at the Oscar and BAFTA-qualifying Rhode Island International Film Festival.

She has been married to actor Jonathan Harden since 2008.

== Television ==
Year	Title	Role
2014–2016	The Fall	Gail McNally
2013	Holby City	Jess Chandler
2013	London Irish	Aisling
2010	Doctors	Glazier
2009	Occupation	Kerri
2009	Best: His Mother's Son	Ruby Emerson
2004	Pulling Moves	Mowgli

== Films ==
Year	Title	Role
2008	Freakdog	Kenneth's mother
2004	Mickybo and Me	Fusco's Ice-Cream Waitress
