= Ingenious Media =

UK media investment and advisory group

- Type: Private
- Industry: Investment
- Genre: Investment and advisory group
- Founded: 1998; 28 years ago
- Founder: Patrick McKenna
- Headquarters: London, W1; United Kingdom
- Key people: Patrick McKenna (CEO 1998–present)
- Number of employees: 80
- Website: www.theingeniousgroup.co.uk

Ingenious Media (styled as INGENIθUS) is a division of London-based Ingenious Capital Management Limited, also known as Ingenious. The company was founded in 1998 by Patrick McKenna and is focused on media, real estate and infrastructure.

In 2018, Ingenious Media partnered with Solstice Studios to produce and distribute theatrical feature films.

== Tax avoidance case ==
In July 2014, Ingenious Media was investigated by HMRC for promoting tax avoidance schemes. In October 2014, HMRC sent "accelerated payment notices" to people who had invested with Ingenious Media, demanding payment of substantial amounts of tax. The tax bill following his investment in the scheme was cited in the subsequent bankruptcy hearings of the former Liverpool and Republic of Ireland footballer, Steve Staunton. In 2018, a group of more than 500 investors launched a civil case against Ingenious for making false representations which Ingenious had always denied. Ingenious (specifically Ingenious Games LLP, Inside Track Productions LLP and Ingenious Film Partners 2 LLP) lost their appeal against HMRC's initial ruling in June 2019, with the Upper Tribunal ruling that "None of the LLPs were carrying on a trade. None of the LLPs were carrying on a trade with a view to profit."

However, in August 2021 the Court of Appeal overturned the ruling of the Upper Tribunal in respect of Inside Track Productions LLP and Ingenious Film Partners 2 LLP on both the trading and with a view to profit issues.
