= Colin Young (film educator) =

British film educator (1927–2021)

Colin Young CBE (5 April 1927 – 27 November 2021) was a British film educator, chairman of the School of Theater, Film and Television at UCLA, founder of the film program at Rice University, Houston, Texas, and the first director of the British National Film and Television School. He was awarded a BAFTA Academy Fellowship Award, the highest honor of the British Academy of Film and Television Arts, in 1993.

== Early life ==
Young was born in Glasgow, Scotland on 5 April 1927. He graduated from the University of St Andrews with a degree in Philosophy and Morals. He worked in Scotland as a film journalist before going to California to study film at UCLA, where he earned a MFA degree.

== UCLA ==
At UCLA, Young moved from student to teacher, becoming chairman of the School of Theater, Film and Television in 1965. Graduates during his tenure included Francis Ford Coppola, Paul Schrader, John Milius, Haskell Wexler, Barry Levinson and Lawrence Kasdan. Two of his students became famous one year later under the name of The Doors, Ray Manzarek and Jim Morrison. He had a policy of employing filmmakers who were in between jobs to teach: although as David MacDougall said some of them "couldn't teach", despite that "they were infected with the virus of cinema and we caught it from them".

He was particularly involved in the creation of UCLA's Ethnographic Film Program, launched in 1966 inspired by the ideas of Harold Garfinkel, intending to bring film and anthropology together.

While in California, he also wrote for the University of California Press's journal Film Quarterly, becoming its LA editor.

== National Film and Television School ==
In 1970 when the decision was made to establish a national film school in the UK in order to revitalise the British film industry, Young was invited to apply to become the founding director, a post which he took up in 1971. He worked there for more than two decades, at a time when the school produced alumni including Bill Forsyth, Terence Davies, Julien Temple, Beeban Kidron, and Nick Park.

Young believed the difference between film school graduates and those who learned on the job was that the former "will have their time directed by themselves in a school environment which is keyed to their development and will leave within them a spirit of an inner-directed development as opposed to the industry’s outer-directed one."

He placed a particular emphasis on documentary, particularly what he called "observational cinema", which sought to avoid both melodrama and didacticism. The School produced documentarists including Nick Broomfield and Molly Dineen. He also favoured a loosely structured "active curriculum" in which students learned by working on projects rather than being taught in more formal situations.

== Later life ==
Young left the school in 1992 and founded Ateliers du Cinema Europeen in Paris, to train European film producers.

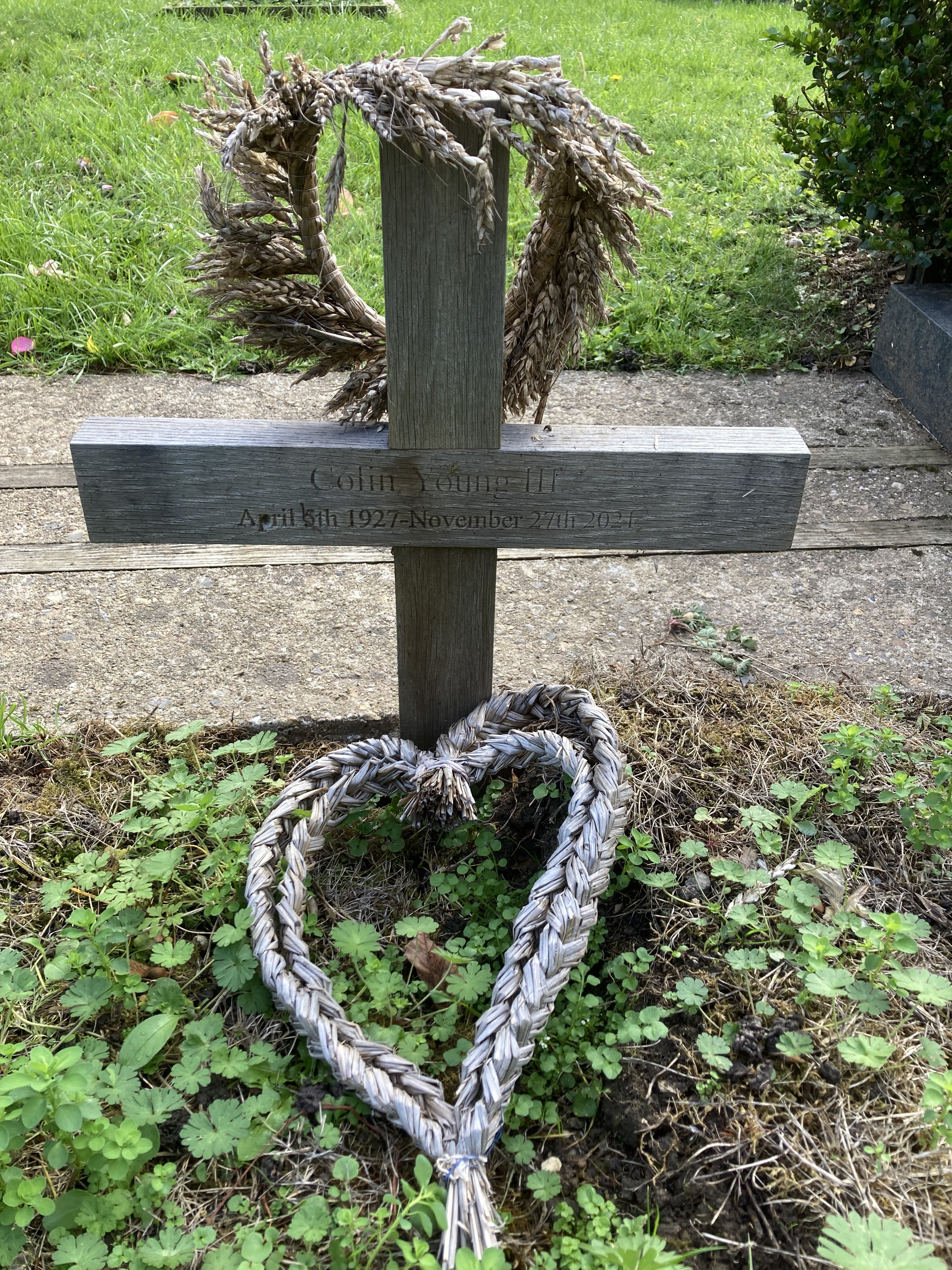
Grave of Colin Young in Highgate Cemetery

He died on 27 November 2021, at the age of 94 and was buried on the eastern side of Highgate Cemetery.

== Awards ==
As well as the BAFTA Academy Fellowship Award he received in 1993, he received an OBE and CBE from the British government and the Chevalier des Arts et des Lettres from the French government.
