= Molly Dineen =

British documentary filmmaker

- Born: Toronto, Ontario, Canada
- Education: National Film and Television School
- Occupation: Documentary Filmmaker
- Known for: The Lie of the Land (2007), Geri (1999), The Ark (1993), Home from the Hill (1985)
- Children: 3

Molly Dineen is a British documentary film director, cinematographer, and producer. One of Britain's most acclaimed documentary filmmakers, Dineen is known for her intimate and probing portraits of British individuals and institutions. Her work includes The Lie of the Land (2007), examining the decline of the countryside and British farming; The Ark (1993) about London Zoo during Thatcherism; and the Lords' Tale (2002), which examined the removal of hereditary peers.

== Early life ==
Dineen was born in Canada and brought up in Birmingham, England. She attended the Bournville School of Art and then studied Photography, Film and Television at the London College of Printing. Sound Business (1981), featuring sound producer Lloyd Coxsone and record store owner Blacker Dread (Steve Burnett-Martin) was her final degree project. She then worked for two years for a documentary camera crew, becoming a member of the ACTT Union. She went on to the National Film and Television School, where she studied documentary under Herb Di Gioia and Colin Young, achieving recognition for her 1987 debut Home from the Hill. This film, which dealt with the themes of colonialism, international development, and the end of the British Empire, was picked up by BBC Two for Eddie Mirzoeff's 40 Minutes series, nominated for a BAFTA and shown in 22 other countries.

== Career in documentary ==
Dineen makes observational documentaries and has a "tone of her own". She has been described as a "leading film-maker of her generation". Her style is unique, creating close personal portraits of issues and institutions. She has been described as exemplary, "standing-ovation television...Dineen is our box Byron". In 1997, she made the party election broadcast for Tony Blair. In 2011, the British Film Institute released a three volume box set of her work. "Her camera watches faces, conversations and behaviour patterns with a seemingly incurious objectivity, allowing her subjects to unveil their secret fears and frustrations".

== Awards and nominations ==
- Winner of BAFTA Best Single Documentary
- Winner of BAFTA Best Factual Series
- Winner of Grierson Award for Best Documentary on a Contemporary Issue
- Winner of Grand Jury Prize at Visions du Reel, Neon
- Winner of Royal Television Society Documentary Award
- Winner of Royal Television Society Prize
- Winner of First Prize at Anthropos Documentary Festival, Los Angeles
- Winner of Women in Film and Television - Broadcaster's Contribution to the Medium Award
- Winner of Prix des Bibliothèques at Lyon Biennale Europeane de Cinema
- Winner of TV Suisse Rommande Prize, Nyon Documentary Festival
- Winner of Voice of Viewers and Listeners Best Television Programme
- Winner of Uppsala Film Festival Documentary Prize
- Winner of Indies Documentaries and Features Awards
- Winner of BFI Kodak Newcomers of the Year Award

== Filmography ==
- Home from the Hill – 1985 BBC Two documentary about Lieutenant-Colonel Hilary Hook's return to the UK after living abroad. Won Royal Television Society Prize. First Prize at Anthropos Documentary Festival, Los Angeles. TV Suisse Rommande Prize.
- My African Farm (BBC Two, 1988) – Dineen returns to Kenya and to the home of Sylvia Richardson, a stalwart of British colonialism.
- Operation Raleigh, The Mountain, The Village (BBC Two, 1988) – Operation Raleigh was founded by the Prince of Wales to give young people the benefit of war time in peace. Two 30-minute films about an expedition to Southern Chile.
- Heart of the Angel (BBC Two, 1989) – Capturing life in Angel Tube Station, one of the busiest on the London Underground. Won Royal Television Society Documentary Award.
- The Pick, the Shovel and the Open Road (Channel 4, 1990) – A 60-minute film about the Irish roadwork company McNicholas.
- The Ark (BBC Two, 1993) – Four films about London Zoo. Won the BAFTA for Best Factual Series, a Special Commendation at the Prix Europa, won Voice of Viewers and Listeners Best Television Programme and Indies Documentaries and Features Award.
- In the Company of Men (BBC Two, 1995) – A three-part series which joins Major Crispin Black and his men in The Prince of Wales Company of the Welsh Guards during a final tour of duty in pre-ceasefire Northern Ireland. Won Women in Film and Television - Broadcaster's Contribution to the Medium Award.
- Tony Blair, a short profile of the Prime Minister produced as a party political broadcast and screened on all four channels for the general election campaign in 1997.
- Geri (Channel 4, 1999) – about Geri Halliwell, one of the Spice Girls.
- The Lord's Tale (Channel 4, 2002) – About the hereditary lords losing their seats in the Lords due to the House of Lords Act 1999.
- The Lie of the Land (Channel 4, 2007) – On the eve of the fox hunting ban, Dineen explores life in the British countryside, where farmers struggle to survive under the weight of government legislation and national indifference towards rural communities. Won the BAFTA for Best Single Documentary, Grand Jury Prize at Visions du Reel in Nyon, Grierson Award for Best Single Documentary on a Contemporary Issue.
- Being Blacker (BBC Two, 2018) – Following three years of Blacker Dread's life.

== Personal life ==
Dineen has been married to William Sieghart since 1996. They have three children.
