= Crispin Black =

British intelligence consultant and commentator

- Born: 1960 (age 65–66)
- Education: Harrow School, University of London, St John's College, Cambridge, Royal Military Academy Sandhurst.
- Occupations: Soldier, intelligence consultant

Lieutenant-Colonel Crispin Nicholas Black MBE (born 1960) is a British intelligence consultant and commentator on terrorism and intelligence, after a previous career as a British Army officer. He is a veteran of the Falklands War and is retained by the BBC as an expert on terrorism. He was previously an Associate Fellow at Chatham House.

== Education ==
Black was educated at Harrow School, the University of London and at St John's College, Cambridge, followed by the Royal Military Academy Sandhurst.

== Military career ==
On 11 April 1981, Black was commissioned into the Welsh Guards as a second lieutenant. He commanded a platoon in the Falklands War of 1982, surviving the bombing of RFA Sir Galahad, and was promoted lieutenant on 25 January 1984, captain on 11 October 1987, and major on 30 September 1991. He had three tours of Northern Ireland, where one of his roles was as an intelligence officer in Republican West Belfast, and he also served with the British Army of the Rhine and the United Nations Peacekeeping Force in Cyprus. After attending the Staff College, Black specialised in intelligence. In the 1997 New Year Honours, he was appointed Member of the Order of the British Empire for his Defence Intelligence Staff work in connection with the break-up of Yugoslavia.

Black was promoted lieutenant colonel on 30 June 2000. He was on intelligence duty on the night of 11–12 September 2001, and retired the service on 1 July 2002, his last posting being a secondment to the Cabinet Office as an intelligence adviser to the Prime Minister, the Joint Intelligence Committee and COBR (Cabinet Office Briefing Room).

In the early 1990s, he and his Welsh Guards were the subject of a BBC television documentary by Molly Dineen called In the Company of Men. In the course of that, Black said that if John Birt (then Director-General of the BBC) had been a member of his regiment, he would have had him sacked, and one commentator described him as the "suavely telegenic star" of the documentary.

== Author and journalist ==
Black is a frequent contributor to major British newspapers on terrorism and intelligence matters, including The Daily Telegraph, The Guardian, and The Independent.

In July 2004, Black wrote of the 2003 invasion of Iraq that George W. Bush and Tony Blair had "cooked the intelligence books on both sides of the Atlantic". He has been critical of all three major British political parties on Afghanistan, writing in 2010 "The Iraq War was a two-party stitch-up between the Labour government and an eager Conservative opposition. This time round on Afghanistan it's a three-party stitch-up." He has also suggested that the outcome in Afghanistan remains a gamble and questioned whether politicians with no military experience should be left to take such decisions.

His 2006 book 7-7 The London Bombs – What Went Wrong? examines the intelligence and other failures leading up to the 7 July 2005 bombings in London. On that subject, he has commented "MI5 director general Jonathan Evans's persistent unwillingness to accept that his agency could have thwarted the 7/7 bombers if they had been more on the ball shows the petulance of a losing football manager".

== Lecturer ==
Black has degrees from the universities of London and Cambridge, where he spent a year at St John's College on a defence fellowship, and has lectured at both.

== 2010 general election ==
At the UK general election of 2010, Black stood unsuccessfully as an Independent candidate in South West Wiltshire.

== Private life ==
Black is married with two daughters.

== Works ==
- 7-7: What Went Wrong (Gibson Square Books, 2006) ISBN 978-1903933718
- The Falklands Intercept: MI5, Surete, CIA (Gibson Square Books, 2013) ISBN 978-1908096388
- The Paris Trap: A Daniel Jacot Spy Mystery (Gibson Square Books, 2017) ISBN 978-1783341153
- Too Thin for a Shroud (Gibson Square Books, 2023) ISBN 978-1783342297
