= Jonathan Harden =

Northern Irish actor and director

- Born: Belfast, Northern Ireland
- Occupations: Actor; director
- Years active: 2001–present
- Spouse: Bronágh Taggart (m. 2008)

Jonathan Harden is a Northern Irish actor and director from Belfast.

== Early life ==
Jonathan Harden was born in Belfast, Northern Ireland.

== Career ==
Harden's most notable credits include the roles of Martin Baxter in Australian miniseries Mix Tape, David 'Jonty' Johnston in BBC cop drama Blue Lights, Sean Rawlins in the crime drama series Unforgotten, Gregory in the final season of the comedy series Peep Show, Brendan Murphy in Jimmy McGovern's 2021 prison drama Time, and a Resistance Monitor in Star Wars: The Last Jedi.

Harden's stage credits include Henry Joy McCracken in Stewart Parker's Northern Star at the Finborough Theatre and Children of the Sun at the Royal National Theatre under the direction of the late Howard Davies. Of his performance in Northern Star, the Time Out review wrote, "Jonathan Harden reveals himself as an extraordinary talent whose performance leaves an afterglow like a good whiskey."

Harden provided the narration for 2015 BAFTA-winning short film Boogaloo and Graham. He has also provided voices for several video games, most notably as Xenophilius Lovegood in Harry Potter and the Deathly Hallows: Part I. In 2014, he played Axl in the Ridley Scott-produced Halo film Halo: Nightfall.

In 2015, Harden launched In Anything at the Minute? The Honest Actors' Podcast, a project centred on interviews with other jobbing actors and available on iTunes. In 2017, he produced and directed his first film project, Guard, a female-led boxing film set in Belfast. It had its debut at the Galway Film Fleadh in July 2017, and soon after had its North American premiere at the Rhode Island International Film Festival. In 2018, it was followed by Troubles, on the subject of male mental health, which again debuted at the Galway Film Fleadh.

Following his venture into film directing, Harden made his London stage directing debut in 2020, with Joe Crilly's On McQuillan's Hill at the Finborough Theatre. The production sold out and received critical acclaim, including five stars from the Morning Star and four stars from The Stage. Originally produced in 2000 at the Lyric Theatre, Belfast, the Finborough production was an English premiere and marked the 20th anniversary of the play's Belfast debut.

In 2021, Harden appeared in Jimmy McGovern's prison drama Time as lifer, Brendan Murphy. The role earned him praise from many, with Esquire calling this performance, "a highly-charged, emotive turn, and the Sunday Life noting it as "superb".

== Personal life ==
Harden is a vegan and enjoys running. He is married to Northern Irish actress Bronágh Taggart.

== Filmography ==
=== Film ===
Year	Title	Role
2008	Fifty Dead Men Walking	Young Man's Brother
2009	Five Minutes of Heaven	David
2009	Ditching	Paul
2009	Ghost Machine	Benny
2011	Dreams of a Life	Cleaner
2011	Whole Lotta Sole	Sammy Pavis
2012	Jump	Richie
2012	The Good Man	Stephen
2012	Hives	Bus
2013	The Invisible Woman	Charles / Mr Arnott
2014	Rise of the Footsoldier II	Dave
2015	The Ones Below	Mark
2015	The Truth Commissioner	Gleeson
2016	Star Wars: The Last Jedi	Resistance Monitor
2017	Another Mother's Son	Bookshop Owner
2017	Victoria & Abdul	Kaiser Wilhelm II
2017	Justice.net	Gerald McNulty
2018	Doing Money	DC Liam Partridge
2020	The Courier	Leonard

=== Television ===
Year	Title	Role
2009	Small Island	Postal Worker #1
2010	Coming Up	The Young Man
2012	Titanic: Blood and Steel	Walter Hill
2012	The Life and Adventures of Nick Nickleby	Newman Noggs
2013	The Mimic	Connor
2014	Halo: Nightfall	Axl
2015	Humans	Andy
2015	Unforgotten	Sean Rawlins
2015	Peep Show	Gregory
2016	Casualty	Dion Bateman
2016	My Mother and Other Strangers	Martin Brady
2016	SS-GB	Assassin
2016	The Secret	D.C. Devine
2017	EastEnders	DS Kye Anderson
2018	Dark Heart	Grant Balden
2020	COBRA	DI Miller
2021	Time	Brendan Murphy
2022	Sherwood	Reverend Wells
2023	Blue Lights	Inspector David 'Jonty' Johnston
2023	World on Fire	Captain Briggs
2024	Ellis	Adam Reid
2025	Mix Tape	Martin Baxter
2025	The Rainmaker	Agent Nick Cistulli
