= South West Wiltshire =

UK Parliament constituency (since 2010)

Coordinates: 51.260°N 2.186°W

- County constituency for the House of Commons
- Interactive map of boundaries since 2024
- Boundary of South West Wiltshire in South West England
- County: Wiltshire
- Electorate: 71,551 (2023)
- Major settlements: Trowbridge, Westbury, Warminster, Mere

Current constituency
- Created: 2010
- Member of Parliament: Andrew Murrison (Conservative)
- Seats: One
- Created from: Westbury, Salisbury

South West Wiltshire is a constituency in Wiltshire, England. The constituency has been represented in the House of Commons of the UK Parliament by Andrew Murrison, a Conservative, since its inauguration in 2010. (Note: As with all constituencies, South West Wiltshire elects one Member of Parliament (MP) by the first past the post system of election at least every five years.)

== Constituency profile ==
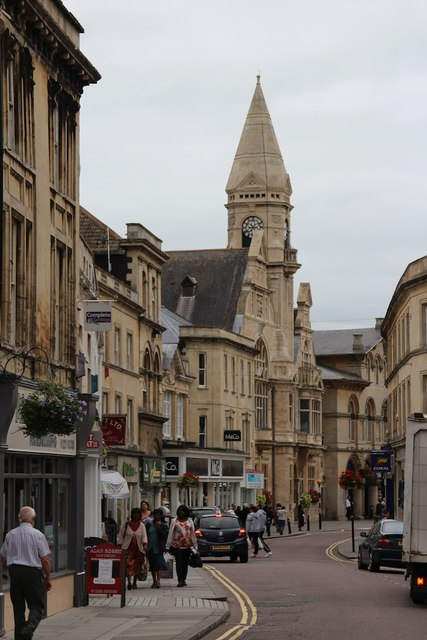
Silver Street, Trowbridge

South West Wiltshire is a constituency in Wiltshire in South West England. Its largest town is Trowbridge, which has a population of around 44,000. Other towns include Westbury, Warminster and Mere.

Most of this constituency's population live in the three neighbouring towns of Trowbridge, Westbury and Warminster. The rest of the constituency is rural and sparsely populated; the south contains the West Wiltshire Downs, an area of rolling chalk hills, and the south-east includes part of Salisbury Plain, a large British Army training area. This facility and the Warminster Garrison give the area a considerable military presence.

Trowbridge is a historic market town on the edge of the Cotswolds that was nicknamed the "Manchester of the West" during the industrial era for its significant textiles sector, making it one of South West England's few industrial towns. There is some deprivation in Trowbridge although the town has some affluent suburbs. The rest of the constituency has average levels of wealth. House prices here are generally lower than the regional and UK averages.

South West Wiltshire has below-average proportions of young and middle-aged adults and a large retired population. As of 2026, residents have average levels of income, homeownership and education and the child poverty rate is below-average. A high proportion of residents work in the retail, accommodation and defence sectors and the percentage claiming unemployment benefits is low. White people made up 95% of the population at the 2021 census.

Since the 2025 Wiltshire Council election, Trowbridge and Westbury are represented by a mixture of Liberal Democrat and Reform UK councillors whilst Warminster and the rural villages mostly elected Conservatives. An estimated 58% of voters in South West Wiltshire supported leaving the European Union in the 2016 referendum, higher than the UK-wide figure of 52%.

== History ==
The constituency was created for the 2010 general election, following the Fifth Periodic Review of Westminster constituencies tasked to the Boundary Commission, by which Parliament increased the number of seats in the county from six to seven.

The previous Westbury constituency was abolished: the northern part (including the town of Bradford-on-Avon) was transferred to the reinstated Chippenham seat, and the southern part (including the towns of Trowbridge, Warminster, and Westbury) formed the bulk of this constituency, which to complete it, received a minority of wards from the Salisbury seat.

== Boundaries ==
Map of boundaries from 2010 to 2024

2010–2024: The former District of West Wiltshire wards of Dilton Marsh, Ethandune, Mid Wylye Valley, Shearwater, Southwick and Wingfield, Summerham, Trowbridge Adcroft, Trowbridge College, Trowbridge Drynham, Trowbridge John of Gaunt, Trowbridge Park, Warminster East, Warminster West, Westbury Ham, and Westbury Laverton, and the former District of Salisbury wards of Donhead, Fonthill and Nadder, Knoyle, Tisbury and Fovant, and Western and Mere.

2024–present: Further to the 2023 Periodic Review of Westminster constituencies which came into effect for the 2024 United Kingdom general election, the constituency is composed of the following (as they existed on 4 May 2021):

- The Wiltshire electoral divisions of: Ethandune; Hilperton; Mere; Southwick; Trowbridge Adcroft; Trowbridge Central; Trowbridge Drynham; Trowbridge Grove; Trowbridge Lambrok; Trowbridge Park; Trowbridge Paxcroft; Warminster Broadway; Warminster East; Warminster North & Rural; Warminster West; Westbury East; Westbury North; Westbury West; Wylye Valley.

In order to bring the electorate within the permitted range, Tisbury and the Nadder Valley were transferred to Salisbury. The village of Hilperton was added from Chippenham, while several rural parishes east of Trowbridge were transferred to Melksham and Devizes.

== Members of Parliament ==
Election	Member	Party	Notes
2010	Andrew Murrison	Conservative	Surgeon Commander (RN), retired 2000; Parliamentary Under-Secretary of State for Defence People, Veterans and Service Families 2022 – 2024

== Elections ==
=== Elections in the 2020s ===
General election 2024: South West Wiltshire
Party	Candidate	Votes	%	±%
Conservative	Andrew Murrison	15,617	33.8	−24.5
Labour	Evelyn Akoto	12,374	26.8	+5.3
Reform	Garry Irvin	7,840	17.0	N/A
Liberal Democrats	Bret Palmer	7,205	15.6	−0.9
Green	Fay Whitfield	2,243	4.9	+1.2
Independent	James Ward	448	1.0	N/A
Independent	Thomas Culshaw	441	1.0	N/A
Majority		3,243	7.0	−29.8
Turnout		46,168	64.5	−1.5
Registered electors		71,574		
Conservative hold		Swing	−14.9	

=== Elections in the 2010s ===
2019 notional result
Party	Vote	%
Conservative	27,546	58.3
Labour	10,168	21.5
Liberal Democrats	7,787	16.5
Green	1,736	3.7
Turnout	47,237	66.0
Electorate	71,551	

General election 2019: South West Wiltshire
Party	Candidate	Votes	%	±%
Conservative	Andrew Murrison	33,038	60.2	+0.2
Labour	Emily Pomroy-Smith	11,408	20.8	−5.7
Liberal Democrats	Ellen Nicholson	8,015	14.6	+4.8
Green	Julie Phillips	2,434	4.4	+1.8
Majority		21,630	39.4	+5.9
Turnout		54,895	70.4	−1.6
Conservative hold		Swing	+3.0	

General election 2017: South West Wiltshire
Party	Candidate	Votes	%	±%
Conservative	Andrew Murrison	32,841	60.0	+7.3
Labour	Laura Pictor	14,515	26.5	+13.0
Liberal Democrats	Trevor Carbin	5,360	9.8	−0.8
Green	Chris Walford	1,445	2.6	−3.2
Independent	Liam Silcocks	590	1.1	N/A
Majority		18,326	33.5	−1.7
Turnout		54,751	72.0	+1.3
Conservative hold		Swing	−2.9	

General election 2015: South West Wiltshire
Party	Candidate	Votes	%	±%
Conservative	Andrew Murrison	27,198	52.7	+1.0
UKIP	Matthew Brown	9,030	17.5	+12.0
Labour	George Aylett	6,948	13.5	+2.0
Liberal Democrats	Trevor Carbin	5,482	10.6	−19.9
Green	Phil Randle	2,985	5.8	N/A
Majority		18,168	35.2	+14.0
Turnout		51,643	70.7	+2.3
Conservative hold		Swing		

General election 2010: South West Wiltshire
Party	Candidate	Votes	%	±%
Conservative	Andrew Murrison	25,321	51.7	+2.5
Liberal Democrats	Trevor Carbin	14,954	30.5	+0.3
Labour	Rebecca Rennison	5,613	11.5	−5.7
UKIP	Michael Cuthbert-Murray	2,684	5.5	+2.0
Independent	Crispin Black	446	0.9	N/A
Majority		10,367	21.2	+2.2
Turnout		49,018	68.4	+3.8
Conservative hold		Swing	+1.1	

== See also ==
- List of parliamentary constituencies in Wiltshire
