= Hilary Hook =

British Indian Army officer (1917–1990)

Lieutenant-Colonel Hilary Hook
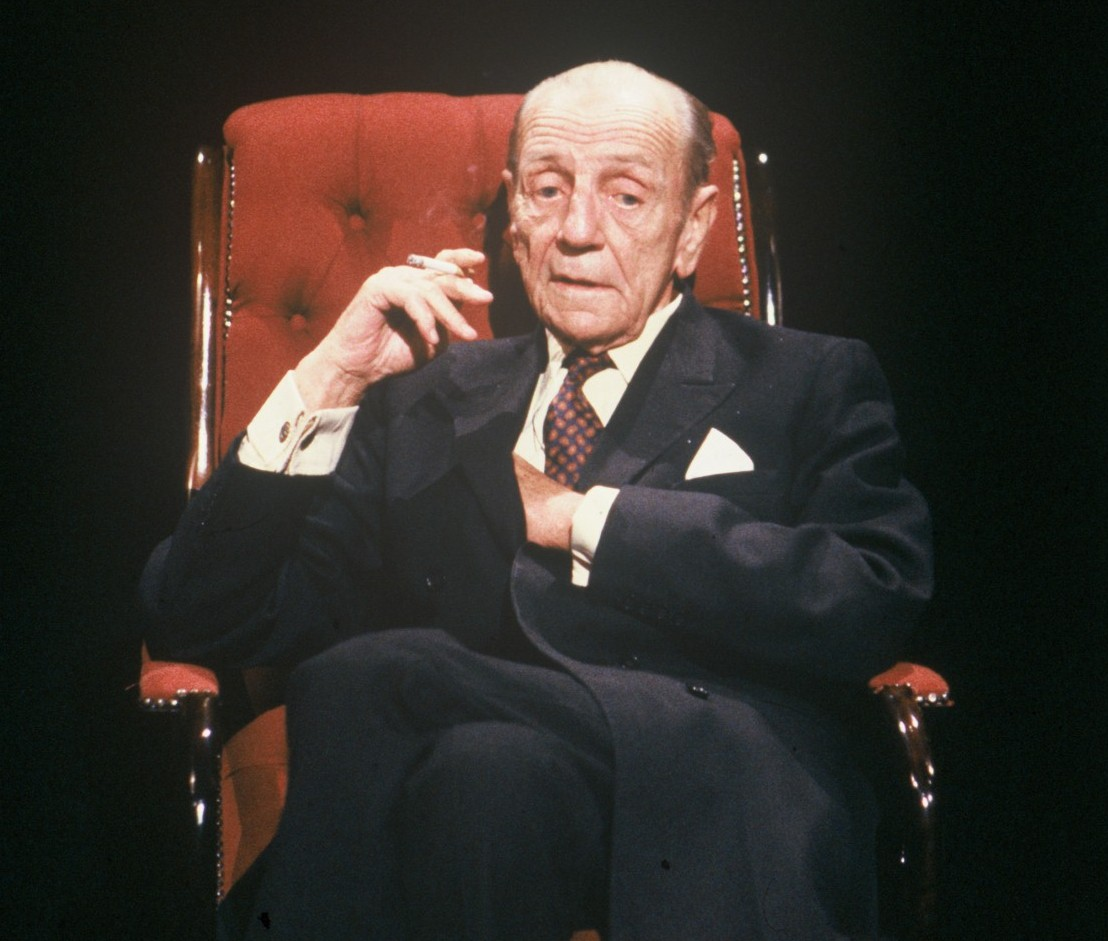
- Appearing on television programme After Dark in June 1987 – "Is Britain Working?".
- Born: 26 September 1917
- Died: 14 September 1990 (aged 72)
- Military career
- Allegiance: British Empire
- Service years: 1938–1964
- Rank: Lieutenant Colonel

Lieutenant-Colonel Hilary Hook (26 September 1917 – 14 September 1990) was a soldier in armies of the British Empire in India and later in Africa.

Hook was born on 26 September 1917, the son of Bryan (1856 - 1925) and Dorothea Mary Hook née Northcote (1882 - 1967, a granddaughter of the 1st Earl of Iddesleigh), of Churt, Surrey, and baptized there into the Church of England on 16 December 1917.

He was the youngest of a large family as his father had remarried to his mother in 1914 after his first wife, Catherine Mosely Dewrance (1861 - 1911) had died. His siblings were (from the first marriage) Logan (1888 - 1976); Una (1889 - 1979); Raymond (1893 - 1973); Oliver (1894); Valentine (1895 - 1917 killed in action near Arras); Sylvia (Fazan) (1897 - 1996); Hereward (1899 - 1971); and Christopher (1902 - 1978): and from the second marriage, Ivan (1915 - 1991); and Stafford (1916 - 1996).

He was educated at Canford School, Dorset, and the Royal Military College, Sandhurst.

His military appointments following completion of Sandhurst training ran as follows:-

Commissioned 2nd Lieutenant on the Unattached List for the Indian Army (ULIA) 27 January 1938.

Attached in India to the 1st battalion, The Queens Regiment 1/4/1938 for a year (at this time all newly commissioned officers of the ULIA did a year on attachment to a British Army regiment in India before joining their Indian Army units.) From April to July 1939 he was on leave outside India with a medical certificate (this means he was not fit for duty while he was on medical leave).

Confirmed 2nd Lieutenant, Indian Army 27/11/39 and posted to Royal Deccan Horse (9th Horse) (RDH). His autobiography states he joined the RDH in January 1938 – the first date is correct as it is taken from the Indian Army List and as the RDH did not move to Mardan (which is where the RDH were to be stationed and he was to join) until at least October 1939.

Promoted Lieutenant 27/4/40, then voluntarily joined 2/2nd_Commando_Squadron_(Australia) as a Private to see action in New Guinea as his unit had not yet been deployed before returning to his former unit and rank. During the Second World War Hook served in New Guinea and Burma.

Acting Captain 1/4/41 - 30/6/41, Temporary Captain 12/10/41 - 15/6/42.

By April 1942 he was serving on the staff of 251st Indian Armoured Brigade based at Secunderabad.

War Substantive Captain 22/5/43, Acting Major 22/3/43 – 21/5/43, Temporary Major 22/5/43 – 13/5/44, Temporary Major 5/8/44 - 22/10/44, Temporary Major 28/4/45 - 16/2/46,

Appointed to the staff of the Indian Armoured Corps Trade Training Centre as a Group commander on 22/4/46.

Captain 27/1/46. Temporary Major 21/3/46 - 31/3/48,

He transferred to the 7th Hussars (later the Queen's Own Hussars) as a captain on 28 June 1947.

Specially employed 23/10/49 – 2/4/54 with the Sudan_Defence_Force. Other postings included Aden, Germany, and Hong Kong.

Temporary Major 21/6/50 - 26/1/51, Major 27/1/51.

Appointed Temporary Lieutenant Colonel & Local Colonel 12/8/61 – ? 1964.

Military Attaché to the Sudan at Khartoum 12/8/61 to 1964.

Retired with the rank of Major (Hon Lieutenant Colonel) 13/10/64.

Hook married on 20th December 1951 after returning to Khartoum following a three-month leave in Britain. His wife, Jane Ann Budgen, had been brought up in Kenya and they married at Nanyuki before returning to El Obeid in Kordofan Privince. They later moved to Hong Kong and were the centre of an active social circle but the disruption of multiple postings took its toll on the marriage and they had divorced by the 1960s. They had two sons, Simon Hook and Harry Hook, a screenwriter, director and producer who appeared in the 40 Minutes documentary, Home from the Hill.

After leaving the Army, he moved to Kenya and worked at Treetops for two years before setting up a company offering photographic safaris with his friend Digby Tatham-Warter.

Hook became famous with the British public in the 1980s as the result of a BBC Forty Minutes documentary entitled Home from the Hill directed by Molly Dineen. This portrayed him as having led a full life of adventure in the British Empire, before coming home to an England which had changed out of all recognition to the one he remembered. Memorable scenes included Hook relaxing on the veranda of the game lodge he ran in Kenya while an African servant mowed the lawn, and back in England attempting to operate a kitchen appliance and voicing his displeasure at a pop music act on television.

The documentary was based on Hook's autobiographical book Home from the Hill, in which he describes participation in activities such as pig-sticking, elephant hunting and polo. It deals with the themes of colonialism, international development, and the end of the British Empire – in particular, through his alienation from the modern world having lived all his life in a vastly different culture. The phrase 'home from the hill' is from a line of Robert Louis Stevenson's poem "Requiem": Home is the sailor, home from sea, And the hunter home from the hill.

On his return to England, Hook settled at Warminster. On 12 June 1987, the night after the British General Election, he appeared on a memorable edition of After Dark on Channel 4. Soon afterwards, he also appeared on Wogan.

He died in September 1990 at the age of 72.

== See also ==
- Sudan Defence Force
