= Patrick McKenna (business executive) =

British businessman (born 1956)

Patrick Anthony McKenna (born 11 June 1956) is the chief executive of UK media investment and advisory group Ingenious Media, which he founded in 1998.

== Personal life ==
McKenna was born on 11 June 1956, the son of Mary (née O'Regan), a nurse, and Cianan J. McKenna, a builder. He was brought up in Brentwood and attended St. John Payne Catholic Comprehensive School, Chelmsford. In 1980, he married Margaret Elizabeth Ann White in Brentwood, having four children together. In 2010, he separated from his wife.

== Career ==
After leaving school, he trained as a chartered accountant and got a job with accountants Touche Ross (Deloitte), reaching senior partner status at the age of 28 and heading their Media and Entertainment Group from 1986 to 1990. In 1990, he moved to Lloyd Webber's Really Useful Group, taking up the posts of chairman and chief executive from 1990 to 1997. He subsequently went on to found Ingenious Media in 1998.

He was also charged with tax avoidance.

McKenna is chairman of the television company Hat Trick Productions, the music publisher Stage Three Music and sits on the Advisory Board of the advertising agency BBH (Bartle Bogle Hegarty). He is also chairman of the Young Vic Theatre, a trustee of NESTA and a board member of the British Council. He is a member of the Film Business Academy board at the Cass Business School and is an ambassador for C&binet, the Government’s creative and business international network.

He was previously a board member of the British Tourist Authority (1995–2002) and chairman of its audit committee, was a member of the Government’s Advisory Forum on Tourism and sat on the board of the Liverpool Institute of Performing Arts.

He is also a Fellow of the Royal Society for the encouragement of Arts, Manufactures & Commerce (RSA) and holds honorary doctorates from the University of Westminster and De Montfort University.
