= Coming Up (TV series) =

British anthology TV series (2003–2013)

- Genre: Drama
- Written by: Various
- Directed by: Various
- Starring: Various
- Composers: Dan Parry; Steve Isles
- Country of origin: United Kingdom
- Original language: English
- No. of series: 11
- No. of episodes: 79

Production
- Executive producers: Rob Pursey; Emma Burge; Eileen Quinn
- Producers: Polly Leys; Kate Norris; John Chapman
- Cinematography: Andrew Johnson
- Editors: Nick Follows; Richard Graham
- Running time: 30 minutes
- Production companies: IWC Media; Touchpaper Television

Original release
- Network: Channel 4
- Release: 20 August 2003 – 12 August 2013

Coming Up is a British television anthology series, broadcast on Channel 4. Each series contains up to eight episodes consisting of single stories by writers and directors with no previous experience or less than two hours previous screentime, who are sourced through a talent scheme of the same name. Each series encompasses a wide range of genres and topics, using a range of both experienced and fresh actors. It was created by Darren Bender who pitched the concept to the head of Channel 4's Independent Film & Video department, who turned it down. When Bender later became Commissioning Editor for NightTime at the channel, he asked the channel's drama department to co-commission it with him. It ran initially as Dogma TV (for two series) from 2000 to 2002 and then from 2003 until 2013 as Coming Up.

Episodes did not generally air in a single time slot or on a particular day, with many episodes broadcasting back to back. The series gathered considerable press attention, with The Independent writing: "Thank goodness for Coming Up... it's a genuinely interesting display of possibilities".

In 2014, the talent scheme which recruited writers and directors for the series was revamped. A single screenplay, extended to ninety minutes, was to be produced using three writers from a pool of six and a single director. This version of the scheme ran for a second year in 2015.

In 2016, the scheme was again revamped, and retitled as 4Stories. It encouraged applications from under-represented talent: women, disabled people, BAME, and people from disadvantaged backgrounds, to work on a series of three inter-connected half-hour films. Notable writers and directors who started with this program include Jack Thorne, Jon Sen, Tom Harper and Yann Demange. The series has also produced the debut writing credits of actor Christian Solimeno, actress Bronagh Taggart and presenter Rick Edwards.

== Episodes ==
=== Series overview ===
Series	Episodes	Originally released	
Series	Episodes	First released	Last released
1	8	20 August 2003	9 October 2003
2	7	13 October 2004	1 December 2004
3	7	1 June 2005	1 September 2005
4	8	28 August 2006	7 September 2006
5	8	22 February 2007	20 December 2007
6	7	10 August 2008	27 August 2008
7	7	1 September 2009	6 October 2009
8	7	12 August 2010	2 September 2010
9	7	11 July 2011	12 September 2011
10	7	2 July 2012	20 August 2012
11	7	1 July 2013	12 August 2013

=== Series 1 (2003) ===
No. in series	Title	Directed by	Written by	Original release date
1	"Naked"	Emma Millions	Paul Andrew Williams	20 August 2003
A man struggles to come to terms with the fact that his girlfriend is a naturist, but gets more than he bargained for when he turns up at her parents' wedding anniversary party only to find all of the guests are stark naked. Starring: Ben Sutherland, Sarah Niven, and Lucia Cox
2	"Fierce"	David Hayles	Rachel Das	27 August 2003
Starring Fraser Ayres, Ben Bishop, and Charlotte McDonagh
3	"Re-Ignited"	Holly Phillips	Jon Sen	3 September 2003
A man desperate to become a father uses a dating website to track down an old flame who was extremely broody when he was going out with her. Starring: David Armand, Anil Desai, and Kirsty Dillon
4	"Sick"	Gemma McMullan	Faye Gilbert	17 September 2003
A man who visits his local hospital and GP surgery on a weekly basis with a different set of symptoms each time is accused of being a hypochondriac. Starring: Janet Bamford, Peter Kin Elly, and Victoria Lennox
5	"Victoria"	Dominic McHale	Rupert Jones	24 September 2003
A chance encounter with an old schoolmate forces a man and his girlfriend to re-evaluate their relationship. Starring: Ashley Jensen, Huss Garbiya, and Dominic McHale
6	"Money Can Buy You Love"	Tom MacRae	Mark Soldinger	1 October 2003
Starring: Sophia Myles, Danny Nussbaum, and Louise Page
7	"Loveless"	Martin Brocklebank	Amit Gupta	8 October 2003
Starring: Enzo Cilenti, Alec Newman, and Christine Tremarco
8	"Bed Bugs"	Jane Pugh	Andrea Arnold	9 October 2003
Struggling with his true sexuality, a young man runs away from his pregnant fiancée and falls in love with another man. Starring: Amber Sealey, Dominic Carter, and Ben Homewood

=== Series 2 (2004) ===
No. in series	Title	Directed by	Written by	Original release date
1	"The Baader Meinhoff Gang Show"	Ben Teasdale	Toby Haynes	13 October 2004
A man diagnosed with ME meets with a fellow sufferer during a hospital visit and discovers that he is planning a terrorist attack on a local bank to protest against society's views of people who suffer from life changing illnesses. Starring: Eddie Marsan, Olivia Colman, Amelia Bullmore, and Ewen Bremner
2	"Repeat After Me"	Harry Wootliff	Crispin Whitwell	27 October 2004
A shy man yearns to be king of the jungle in his workplace, and with the help of a female friend, he learns some techniques to improve himself.
3	"Cuckoos"	Justin Villiers	Becky Dodds	3 November 2004
A troubled eighteen year old decides to break into a house and hold its owners hostage, but doesn't count upon becoming hostage himself.
4	"Take My Heart"	Aaron Noel	Ben Cato	10 November 2004
An unlikely friendship forms between two teenage boys.
5	"Snowman"	Jacob Krichefski	Smita Bhide	24 November 2004
A teenager finds himself in trouble after running up a debt to a local gangster.
6	"Tame"	Cristian Solimeno	Cristian Solimeno	1 December 2004
A man makes plans to murder his brother by taking him on a walk through the woods and shooting him in the head. Starring: Sorcha Cusack, Cristian Solimeno and Andy Nyman
7	"Girls and Girls"	Derek Boyle	Andrew Gunn	1 December 2004
Starring: Christine Kavanagh, Florence Hoath, and Samantha Whittaker

=== Series 3 (2005) ===
No. in series	Title	Directed by	Written by	Original release date
1	"Loving Ludmilla"	Paul Berczeller	Paul Berczeller	1 June 2005
As a favour to his east European girlfriend, a man agrees to illegally smuggle her brother into the country, unaware that he's actually her boyfriend. Starring: Toby Jones, Ania Sowinski, and Dylan Charles
2	"Bird's Eye View"	Sasha Hails	David O'Neill	23 August 2005
Starring: Miranda Raison and Charles Mnene
3	"Rockabye"	Tam Hoskyns	Tim Supple	25 August 2005
When a young man turns up on the doorstep of an ordinary family claiming to know information about their only son, who disappeared some ten years previously, emotions boil over and a long buried secret threatens to reveal itself. Starring: Tom Brooke, Alan David, and Alice Knight
4	"Pillow Talk"	William Sutcliffe	Adam Ganz	29 August 2005
Starring: Cavan Clerkin, John Marquez, and Daisy Donovan
5	"Karma Cowboys"	Rae Brunton	Steve Barker	29 August 2005
A Glaswegian debt collector hires an apprentice and gives him a day's trial to prove he can cut his teeth in the business. Starring: Lee Ingleby, Sam Graham and Bob Kingdom
6	"Randomer"	Susan Kenyon	Jules Williamson	31 August 2005
Starring: Jemima Abey, William Hall, and Rachel Hudson
7	"Viva Liberty!"	Dishad Husain	Dishad Husain	1 September 2005
A neurotic, paranoid British Muslim sits on a plane anticipating the trip of a lifetime, but thanks to a freak accident, finds himself vacationing in America's notorious 'Camp Liberty' detention facility. Starring: Samantha Coughlan, William Hope, and Anthony Oseyemi

=== Series 4 (2006) ===
No. in series	Title	Directed by	Written by	Original release date
1	"The Trial"	Matthew McGuchan	John Hardwick	28 August 2006
Four convicted murderers who protest their innocence and agree to take part in a drugs trial to secure their release. Starring: Anthony Flanagan, Lee Williams, and Lars Rudolph
2	"The Window"	Funke Oyebanjo	Paloma Beaza	29 August 2006
A woman forms an unexpected bond with her husband's second wife who arrives from Nigeria asking to seek refuge in their Peckham flat. Starring: Rakie Ayola, Israel Oyelumade, and Gloria Onitiri
3	"Heavenly Father"	Lucy Moore	Ursula Macfarlane	30 August 2006
Dressed as an angel, a divorced father stages a roof-top protest when his ex-wife denies him contact with their daughter, but the protest goes horribly wrong when he plunges from a great height and ends up in a coma in hospital. Starring: Shaun Dooley, Mali Harries, and Alexander Perkins
4	"Happy $lapz"	Michael Keillor	Michael Keillor	31 August 2006
A group of youths hang out on the streets, 'happy slapping' passers-by and filming the results on a mobile phone, but of the gang members is forced to take action when believes their leader has gone too far by knocking a woman off her bike. Starring: Daniel Anthony, Aml Ameen, and Josef Altin
5	"Service"	Tony Saint	Lindy Heymann	4 September 2006
A probationary motorway service station worker is forced into action when a local councillor is murdered on the forecourt after refusing to accept a bribe to reconsider a building project. Starring: Matthew Marsh, Joe Armstrong, and Velibor Topić
6	"The Animator"	Pascal Wyse	Finn McGough	5 September 2006
A talented artist and creator of a violent animation develops a split personality after his boss announces plans to cancel his series in order to create more mainstream animations. Starring: Seb Cardinal, Dustin Demri Burns, and Colin McFarlane
7	"Stir it Up"	Elizabeth Heery	Colin Hutton	6 September 2006
A sixteen-year-old girl helps her recently widowed mother run the family guest house, but is appalled when she decides to holiday in Barbados without her. Starring: Fiona Mollison, Gemma Lawrence, and Jason Deer
8	"A Paradise Adventure"	Dan Hine	Dan Hine	7 September 2006
Depressed after being dumped by his girlfriend, a man applies to a company called Paradise Adventures, who offer help with assisted suicides. Starring: Rick Warden, Alice Lowe, and Katy Carmichael

=== Series 5 (2007) ===
No. in series	Title	Directed by	Written by	Original release date
1	"Spoil"	Debbie Tucker Green	Tom Harper	22 February 2007
Starring: Nadine Marshall, Sharon Duncan-Brewster, and David Gyasi
2	"The Spastic King"	Jack Thorne	Peter Mackie Burns	16 November 2007
Fearful of losing their home, a young man decides not to tell the authorities that his mother has died. Starring: Andrew Stafford, Ruth Sheen, and Chloe Sirene
3	"A Man in a Box"	Alecky Blythe	Yann Demange	10 December 2007
A documentary-style film about autograph hunters, inspired by the real-life people who devote their lives to the hobby. Starring: Jason Watkins, Rosie Cavaliero, and Jon Glover
4	"Scapegoat"	Jeremy Page	Gabrielle Russell	14 December 2007
A well-off city girl thinks she has it made, until her sister asks for her help. Starring: Caroline Hayes, Antonia Campbell-Hughes, and David Sterne
5	"Imprints"	Kate Hardie	Amanda Boyle	16 December 2007
An attractive young woman tries to find out about her past during a consultation with her neurologist, but the neurologist has other intentions. Starring: Neil Dudgeon, Neve McIntosh, and Sharon Bower
6	"99, 100"	Declan Feenan	Ben Gregor	18 December 2007
Two best friends, who feel they have become stuck in a rut, go exploring and find an old deserted ice cream van, but are shocked to find the owner living inside. Starring: Charlene McKenna, Aaron Taylor-Johnson, and Simon Wolfe
7	"In the Dark"	Tom Scholnik	Tom Scholnik	20 December 2007
On the eve of the birth of their first child, a couple spend a restless night questioning their relationship. Starring: Adam Godley and Heather Craney
8	"Brussels"	Tom Browne	Misha Manson-Smith	22 December 2007
Starring Del Synott, Peter Capaldi and Kathryn Drysdale

=== Series 6 (2008) ===
No. in series	Title	Directed by	Written by	Original release date
1	"Emo"	Nicole Taylor	China Moo-Young	10 August 2008
A man recovering from a mental breakdown takes his first steps back into society by getting a job at an out-of-town furniture store, only to find it hard to fit in amongst the pool of teenage employees. Starring: Jefferson Hall, Clare Grogan, and Mhairi Morrison
2	"Lickle Bill Um"	Kate Hardie	Kate Hardie	11 August 2008
A young woman, jealous of her mother's profound success, sets about closing the divide between them by trying to find herself a rich boyfriend and a new circle of friends. Starring: Amanda Abbington, Imelda Staunton, and Reece Shearsmith
3	"The Thai Bride"	Corinna Faith	Corinna Faith	19 August 2008
When a young woman arrives from Thailand to start her marriage with a wealthy London bachelor, she finds settling into her new life harder than expected. Starring: Lourdes Faberes, Terrence Hillyer, and Flora Nicholson
4	"Kings of London"	Sean Conway	Sean Conway	20 August 2008
Two teenage brothers, living in London, divided by their opposing lifestyles and cultures, are forced to work together after being targeted by a local mobster. Starring: Jumayn Hunter, Duane Henry, and Dominique Moore
5	"The Circle"	Waris Islam	Tinge Krishnan	25 August 2008
A deeply traumatised man decides to cut himself off from the outside world by drawing a circle around a derelict petrol station and declaring it his 'safe zone'. But when he is forced to come to the rescue of an injured woman, he realises he is not alone in his plight. Starring: Anthony Flanagan, Shobna Gulati, and Craig Gazey
6	"And Kill Them"	Seamus Hilley	Miranda Bowen	26 August 2008
A platoon of new recruits make their journey through the first few weeks of army training camp, but their solitude is threatened by a cocky young know-it-all whose actions threaten to bring the entire platoon into disrepute. Starring: Warren Brown, Richie Campbell, and Alfie Allen
7	"Thinspiration"	Ruth McCance	Harry Burton	27 August 2008
In the seventeenth century, a young novice at an austere convent takes the Lenten fast to extremes, and her piety captivates the other nuns as wild rumours about her holiness begin to spread. Starring: Lucinda Dryzek, Karen Gillan, and Sian Thomas

=== Series 7 (2009) ===
No. in series	Title	Directed by	Written by	Original release date
1	"Adha Cup"	Sarmad Masud	Sarmad Masud	1 September 2009
Two bored social workers reluctantly agree to reunite the cast of legendary Bollywood musical 'Pappa Kehta Hain' for a return performance at the Pakistan Centre where they work. Starring: Ace Bhatti, Rez Kempton, and Balvinder Sopal
2	"Foreign John"	Sean Buckley	Victor Buhler	1 September 2009
A married couple struggle to communicate with each other following the death of their young daughter, until one of the father's workmates proves an unexpected catalyst for a long overdue reconciliation. Starring: Johnny Harris, Claudie Blakley, and Glen Davies
3	"Pornography"	Simon Stephens	Jo McInnes	8 September 2009
On 7 July 2005, a woman obsessed with breaking taboos decides to seduce her own brother, but their night of passion is interrupted by a series of bombs exploding across London. Starring: Jason Hughes and Kirsty Bushell
4	"Apples and Oranges"	Trevor Williams	Magali Charrier	15 September 2009
A schoolteacher torn between her two lovers is surprised to discover that she is pregnant, and that she has no idea who the baby's father actually is. Starring: Simone James, Alex Lanipekun, and Nathan Stewart-Jarrett
5	"Raising Baby Rio"	Dewi Bruce-Konuah	O. Nathapon	22 September 2009
A young man becomes determined to create a better life for his baby after finding her with her mother in a crack house. But when he loses his job, he finds himself forced to become a dope dealer to make ends meet. Starring: Zawe Ashton, Ashley Madekwe, and Nathaniel Martello-White
6	"Parliamo Glasgow"	Stewart Thomson	Hope Dickson Leach	29 September 2009
A fifteen-year-old Polish immigrant struggles to adapt to live in modern day Glasgow, until she encounters an elderly gent who offers to help her learn English and the Glaswegian slang. Starring Edyta Budnik, Lisa Greenwood and Jamie Quinn
7	"Harvest"	Richard Bean	Alex Winckler	6 October 2009
A bleak tale of two thieves. Starring Michael Socha

=== Series 8 (2010) ===
No. in series	Title	Directed by	Written by	Original release date
1	"Would Like to Meet"	Tom Bidwell	Alex García López and Wayne Yip	12 August 2010
A thirty-year-old woman diagnosed with an inoperable brain tumour makes the tough decision to send her husband on a string of dates in the hope of finding him someone to be with after her death. Starring Lucy Gaskell, Martha Cope and Gareth Farr
2	"Half Term"	Geoff Bussetil	Samuel Donovan	12 August 2010
A fifteen-year-old boy becomes convinced that his elder brother is training to become a suicide bomber, and with the help of his best friend, sets about trying to save him from being radicalised. Starring Jack Deam, James Burrows and Faraz Ayub
3	"The Future WAGs of Great Britain"	Abby Ajayi	Destiny Ekaragha	19 August 2010
Sisters Missy, who is clubbing mad and determined to become a WAG, and Kim, who is studying for a law degree at university, hatch a plan to become rich by earning money from insider football tips. Starring Bunmi Mojekwu, Naana Agyei-Ampadu and Ellen Thomas
4	"I Don't Care"	Pete Wood	Harry Wootliff	19 August 2010
On his thirtieth birthday, a full-time family carer is given the day off and has a chance meeting with a local amateur artist, but the situation takes an unexpected turn when the artist makes an unexpected violent pass at him. Starring Iwan Rheon, David Leon, Mark Benton and Paloma Faith
5	"Eclipse"	Richard Kelly	Michael Lennox	26 August 2010
A young boy kept prisoner in a bare room seizes his chance to escape when a mouse proves an unexpected distraction for his captor. But mesmerised by his new rodent friend, the boy decides to return in an attempt to save him. Starring Fintan McKeown, Mark Ryder and Jonathan Harden
6	"Dip"	Simon Lewis	Lisa Gornick	26 August 2010
A GP besotted by his neighbour across the hall is asked to house sit while she takes up a television acting role, but is left confused when an identical looking woman turns up at his place of work the next day and offers to take him out on a date. Starring Zoe Tapper, Andrew Buchan and Clare-Hope Ashitey
7	"Boy"	Ronan Blaney	Matthew Lenton	2 September 2010
A pickpocket blackmails a Somali immigrant on a London night bus, unaware that he is carrying a gun. However, the pair strike up an unlikely friendship after the pickpocket prevents the immigrant from being arrested by the police by hiding the gun in the pocket of another passenger. Starring Robert Sheehan, Sydney Rae White and Theo Barklem-Biggs

=== Series 9 (2011) ===
No. in series	Title	Directed by	Written by	Original release date
1	"Rough Skin"	Laura Lomas	Cathy Brady	11 July 2011
A woman recently released from prison decides to give up her baby daughter for adoption, much to the disgust of her over-protective mother. Starring Lorraine Ashbourne, Vicky McClure and Marc-Ryan Jordan
2	"Home"	D. C. Moore	Baff Akoto	18 July 2011
Despite being regularly abused by him, a rough sleeper embarks on a frantic search for her estranged son after one of her friends discovers that he has found himself in serious trouble. Starring Lorraine Stanley, Johnny Harris and Branko Tomović
3	"Micah"	Levi David Addai	John Maidens	25 July 2011
A Nigerian native makes plans to retire back home and leave her London home to her eldest son. But when his younger brother unexpectedly returns after years of no contact with the family, tensions overspill. Starring David Ajala, Daniel Kaluuya and Nicky Ladanowski
4	"Food"	Christian Contreras	Jonathan van Tulleken	1 August 2011
Set in the near future, the leader of a far-right group whose policy is to deport all non-British citizens in the wake of a global harvest finds himself the target of a government plan of execution. Starring Roger Allam, Paterson Joseph and Togo Igawa
5	"Magic"	Nick Mohammed	John Williams	15 August 2011
The chairwoman of the local amateur magicians group is accused of murder by members of her organisation, and thus decides to wind up the group with one final spectacular stunt - a stunt that killed her late husband some twenty years earlier. Starring Jane Horrocks, Ricky Grover and Moya Brady
6	"Geronimo"	Dean Stalham	Nele Hecht	5 September 2011
A father and son haulage business is bought into disrepute when the father tries to improve trade by carrying illegal cargo, and the son's only option to save the ailing business is to destroy the evidence against his father. Starring Lee Ross, Colin Mace and Tanya Franks
7	"Hooked"	Alexander Stewart	Henry Darke	12 September 2011
A woman enlists the help of her daughter, who is a nurse, to carry out a do-it-yourself facelift kit. But when the procedure goes horribly wrong, the woman is forced to reveal a shocking secret from her past. Starring Anita Dobson, Cathy Tyson and Adeel Akhtar

=== Series 10 (2012) ===
No. in series	Title	Directed by	Written by	Original release date
1	"New Cross"	Laura Neal	David Stoddart	2 July 2012
An introvert is persuaded by his friends to go clubbing in order to find himself a girlfriend. But when he discovers his new beau is underage, it sets in motion a chain of disturbing events. Starring Russell Tovey, Alex Lanipekun and Alice Sanders
2	"Ben and Lump"	Tom Wells	MJ Delaney	9 July 2012
A gay, confused teenager, fresh out of his first term at university, seeks comfort from his straight best friend, who is unemployed and about to become homeless unless he joins the army. Starring Thomas Turgoose, Lewis Reeves and Georgie Glen
3	"Camouflage"	Lydia Adetunji	Robert Mckillop	16 July 2012
A make-up artist who specialises in scar dressing falls in love with one of her clients who was scarred as a child during civil unrest in Sierra Leone, only to discover a vengeful figure from his past is determined to put paid to the relationship. Starring Lara Pulver, Ashley Walters and Mark Monero
4	"Spoof or Die"	Stacey Gregg	Prasanna Puwanarajah	30 July 2012
When two teenagers becomes victims of the local school bully at a bus stop in Belfast, their decision to bunk off school leads them into an unexpected resurrection with the ghosts of conflict. Starring Yasmin Paige, Monica Dolan and Michael Smiley
5	"Postcode Lottery"	Laurence Wilson	Tom Marshall	6 August 2012
A terminally ill cancer victim is horrified to discover that he is ineligible for free treatment due to the 'postcode lottery', but is surprised when a fellow sufferer reaches out to him with a solution. Starring Jo Hartley, Con O'Neill, Debra Stephenson, Chord Melodic and Jodie Comer
6	"If We Dead Awaken"	James Phillips	Luke McManus	13 August 2012
An ex-KGB spy heads to London to seek out a ballerina who defected several years earlier, but is pressured by his former spy master to drop the case and return to Russia. Starring Stanley Townsend, Phoebe Fox and Ingeborga Dapkunaite
7	"Colour"	Vivienne Franzmann	Lynsey Miller	20 August 2012
An eleven-year-old whose mother is suffering from a depressing mental illness seeks comfort in a Congolese boy from her school, who is good at painting. However, she is devastated when he announces he is returning home to Africa. Starring MyAnna Buring, Michelle Fairley and Rhianna Hosmer

=== Series 11 (2013) ===
No. in series	Title	Directed by	Written by	Original release date
1	"Henry"	John Donnelly	Michael Pearce	1 July 2013
A single mother, struggling with childcare for her two-year-old son, leaves him in a park with a stranger whilst she goes out partying. Unsurprisingly, the police decide to investigate her actions. Starring Phoebe Waller-Bridge, Joseph Gilgun and Steven Miller
2	"Burger Van Champion"	Rick Edwards	Iftekhar Gafar	8 July 2013
A champion burger eater is persuaded by a regular customer at her burger van to enter a speed eating contest in Austin, Texas, which brings her into conflict with her selfish mother. Starring Jessie Cave, Joanna Scanlan and Ricky Grover
3	"Big Girl"	E.V. Crowe	Leanne Welham	15 July 2013
A bridesmaid reunites with her childhood best friend on the eve of her mum's wedding, but is shocked to discover that she is to fly to Sierra Leone the next day for female circumcision. Starring Letitia Wright, Jodie Comer and Ruth Gemmell
4	"Doughnuts"	Ishy Din	Simon Neal	22 July 2013
A supermarket assistant manager, still living at home with his mother, decides it is time to fly the nest after missing the birth of his first child whilst chasing down one of his colleagues. Starring Adeel Akhtar, Anjli Mohindra and Wahab Sheikh
5	"Sammy's War"	Regina Moriarty	Andrea Harkin	29 July 2013
The teenage daughter of an Afghani war correspondent tries to dissuade her from returning to the Middle East by first breaking her arm, and then staging a burglary in which her passport mysteriously disappears. Starring Jessica Barden, Celia Imrie and Lucy Cohu
6	"Call it a Night"	Bronagh Taggart	Samantha Harrie	5 August 2013
After a drug-dealing gangster is imprisoned for killing his father, a well respected member of the local community becomes determined to bring order to the Kilnamuck estate, inaugurating a nightly watch patrol. Starring Conor MacNeill, Barry Ward and Andrew Simpson
7	"Sink or Swim"	Line Langebek Knudsen	Luke Snellin	12 August 2013
The family of a former medal-winning swimmer try to recreate her former glory whilst trying to prevent her being placed in a care home by an overzealous social worker. Starring Charlotte Beaumont, Sarah Hoare and Una Stubbs
