= A Patch of Fog =

2015 film

- Film poster
- Directed by: Michael Lennox
- Written by: John Cairns and Michael McCartney
- Starring: Stephen Graham; Conleth Hill; Lara Pulver
- Release dates: 11 September 2015 (TIFF); 30 June 2016 (UK)
- Running time: 90 minutes
- Country: United Kingdom
- Language: English

A Patch of Fog is a 2015 British thriller film directed by Michael Lennox starring Stephen Graham and Conleth Hill, set in Belfast. It was screened in the Discovery section of the 2015 Toronto International Film Festival.

== Plot ==
A famous author, Sandy Duffy (Conleth Hill), wrote his well-known and only novel, "A Patch of Fog" nearly 25 years ago. Sandy is now a university lecturer and talk-show personality with co-host Lucy (Lara Pulver), who is also Sandy's girlfriend. Still riding the success of his only publication, Sandy has developed a shoplifting addiction and gets caught by a security guard, Robert Green (Stephen Graham).

Robert detains Sandy, shows him the CCTV footage, and threatens to call the police. Sandy pleads with Robert, and Robert agrees not to call the police if Sandy goes for a drink with him. They force an awkward conversation. As Sandy gets ready to leave, Robert reminds him that he still has a copy of the shoplifting footage. They agree to meet that weekend for another drink, at which point Robert will turn over the disk containing the video.

After lecturing at the university, Sandy tells his colleague about Robert, calling him a "sad little man." Robert walks into the classroom, having apparently eavesdropped on the conversation. Robert leads Sandy to some railway tracks and gives him a coin flattened by a passing train and keeps the other for himself as a symbol of their new friendship.

Sandy becomes increasingly concerned with Robert's behaviour and apparent obsession with him. Sandy offers to meet Robert at the pub and they get into an argument. Sandy threatens to tell the police, and Robert threatens him back; they walk to the police station together. As they are approaching the service window, Robert reveals that he has copies of Sandy's other shoplifting incidents. Sandy apologizes for threatening him, and they leave the police station.

Sandy invites Robert to his house and gives him a tour. During the tour, Sandy explains that he doesn't have a copy of his famous novel, but has the original manuscript around the house somewhere. Sandy gets Robert high, offering him a marijuana cigarette, and pretends to connect with Robert. Sandy asks Robert to give him the recordings, but Robert refuses.

At a loss, Sandy takes more extreme measures. He invites Robert to attend a lecture at the university. When Robert arrives, the lecturer informs him that Sandy called in sick. Meanwhile, Sandy drives to Robert's apartment, and breaks in through a back window. Sandy finds the disks, destroys the apartment, and then throws the disks into the River Lagan.

Feeling relieved, Sandy resumes his life teaching and hosting the talk show. Just when everything is looking better, Sandy gets a message from Robert consisting of security footage from Robert's flat, which clearly shows Sandy's crime. Sandy then drives to Robert's flat, begging for forgiveness. Robert shows up at the train tracks, visibly distraught over Sandy's behaviour because he genuinely thought that Sandy was his friend. He then steps in front of an oncoming train, but Sandy tackles Robert and saves him.

On Robert's next shift at the store, he recognises Lucy from Sandy's talk show. He introduces himself to Lucy and her daughter, Phoebe. Phoebe drops something and Robert picks it up; he is enraged to discover that it is the deformed coin he gave to Sandy. Later that evening, Robert sees Sandy with Lucy and her daughter. Robert becomes angry and jealous, and smashes their car windows.

The next day when Robert gets home, Sandy is waiting for him. The living room is empty except for the couch. Sandy explains that he had the delivery men remove all of Robert's furniture and that he ordered an entirely new living room set. Sandy invites him to attend his university lecture that same evening. At the lecture, Sandy assigns the class a new project. He shows the class the video recording of him vandalising Robert's flat, telling the class it is performance art and he will email all the students the video. After the lecture, Sandy tells Robert that his living room is now unrecognisable from the video, and he could have gotten the video from the email, meaning Robert no longer has anything he can use as blackmail. He tells Robert to stay away from him, that he always despised him and is happy to have Robert out of his life.

Robert breaks into Sandy's house and begins searching the house. Eventually, he finds Sandy's original handwritten manuscript of "A Patch of Fog," which is shown to be written by his father. Robert then understands that Sandy's father wrote the book and that Sandy has been a fraud his entire life.

Sandy gets home and demands that Robert return the manuscript, but Robert refuses and instead says that he will move in with Sandy to help him write his own book. Sandy becomes angry and puts Robert in a headlock but slips and falls, accidentally killing him.

Sandy loads Robert's body into his boot and drives to a lake. Sandy dumps Robert's body over the edge of the boat. However, a rope becomes wrapped around Sandy's ankle and pulls him overboard. He is dragged down with Robert and drowns.

== Cast ==
- Stephen Graham as Robert Green
- Conleth Hill as Sandy Duffy
- Lara Pulver as Lucy Walsh
- Ian McElhinney as Freddie Clarke
- Arsher Ali as Troy Griffin
- Stuart Graham as Tom Breslin
