= Boogaloo and Graham =

2014 film

- Film poster
- Directed by: Michael Lennox
- Written by: Ronan Blaney
- Produced by: Brian J. Falconer
- Starring: Martin McCann; Charlene McKenna; Jonathan Harden
- Distributed by: Network Ireland Television
- Release date: 1 August 2014
- Running time: 14 minutes
- Country: United Kingdom
- Language: English

Boogaloo and Graham is a 2014 British short drama film directed by Michael Lennox and starring Martin McCann, Charlene McKenna, and Jonathan Harden. It was nominated for the Academy Award for Best Live Action Short Film at the 87th Academy Awards. It won the BAFTA Award for Best Short Film at the 68th British Academy Film Awards.

== Plot ==
Jamesy and Malachy are given two baby chicks by their father and take on the responsibility of caring for them. Their excitement is short-lived, however, when their parents reveal that the family is about to undergo significant changes.

== Cast ==
- Martin McCann as Father
- Charlene McKenna as Mother
- Jonathan Harden as Older Jamesy
